= English cricket team in India in 1981–82 =

International cricket tour

	England	India
- Dates: 11 November 1981 – 4 February 1982
Captains	Keith Fletcher	Sunil Gavaskar

Test series
- Result: India won the 6-match series 1–0
Most runs	Graham Gooch (487)	Sunil Gavaskar (500)
Most wickets	Ian Botham (17)	Dilip Doshi (22); Kapil Dev (22)
- Player of the series: Kapil Dev

The England cricket team toured India from 11 November 1981 to 4 February 1982 and played 6 Test matches.

India won the Test series 1–0.

== Test matches ==
=== 1st Test ===
27 Nov-1 Dec 1981
scorecard

India	v	England
179 (57 overs); Sunil Gavaskar 55; Graham Dilley 4/47 (13 overs)		166 (100.1 overs); Geoff Boycott 60; Dilip Doshi 5/39 (29.1 overs)
227 (77.3 overs); Kapil Dev 46; Ian Botham 5/61 (22.3 overs)		102 (26.2 overs); Ian Botham 29; Madan Lal 5/23 (12 overs)

India won by 138 runs
Wankhede Stadium, Bombay
Umpires: S Kishen, KB Ramaswami
Player of the match: Kapil Dev

- India won the toss and decided to bat

=== 2nd Test ===
9–14 December 1981
Scorecard

England	v	India
400 (158 overs); David Gower 82; Ravi Shastri 4/83 (43 overs)		428 (150 overs); Sunil Gavaskar 172; John Lever 5/100 (36 overs)
174/3 d. (69 overs); Geoff Boycott 50; Ravi Shastri 1/31 (20 overs)

Match drawn
M Chinnaswamy Stadium, Bangalore
Umpires: MV Gothoskar, PR Punjabi
Player of the match: Sunil Gavaskar

- England won the toss and decided to bat

=== 3rd Test ===
23–28 December 1981
scorecard

England	v	India
476/9 d. (156.4 overs); Chris Tavaré 149; Madan Lal 5/85 (32 overs)		487 (160.1 overs); Gundappa Viswanath 107; Graham Gooch 2/12 (8.1 overs)
68/0 d. (19 overs); Geoff Boycott 34; Madan Lal 0/4 (3 overs)

Match drawn
Feroz Shah Kotla, Delhi
Umpires: SN Hanumantha Rao, S Kishen
Player of the match: Chris Tavaré

- England won the toss and decided to bat

=== 4th Test ===
1–6 January 1982
scorecard

England	v	India
248 (108.2 overs); Keith Fletcher 69; Kapil Dev 6/91 (31 overs)		208 (100 overs); Dilip Vengsarkar 70; Derek Underwood 3/45 (29 overs)
265/5 d. (90 overs); David Gower 74; Dilip Doshi 2/63 (27 overs)		170/3 (83 overs); Sunil Gavaskar 83; John Emburey 2/62 (30 overs)

Match drawn
Eden Gardens, Calcutta
Umpires: MV Gothoskar, S Kishen
Player of the match: Keith Fletcher

- England won the toss and decided to bat

=== 5th Test ===
13–18 January 1982
scorecard

India	v	England
481/4 d. (152.1 overs); Gundappa Viswanath 222; Bob Willis 2/79 (28.1 overs)		328 (155.5 overs); Graham Gooch 127; Dilip Doshi 4/69 (57 overs)
160/3 d. (50 overs); Pranab Roy 60; Bob Willis 1/15 (7 overs)

Match drawn
MA Chidambaram Stadium, Chepauk, Madras
Umpires: B Ganguli, SN Hanumantha Rao
Player of the match: Gundappa Viswanath

- England won the toss and decided to field

=== 6th Test ===
30 Jan-4 Feb 1982
scorecard

England	v	India
378/9 d. (115.2 overs); Ian Botham 142; Dilip Doshi 4/81 (34.2 overs)		377/7 d. (122 overs); Kapil Dev 116; Bob Willis 3/75 (23 overs)

Match drawn
Modi Stadium, Kanpur
Umpires: DN Dotiwalla, MV Gothoskar

- England won the toss and decided to bat

== One Day Internationals (ODIs) ==
India won the Wills Series 2–1.

=== 1st ODI ===
25 November 1981
Scorecard

India; 156/7 (46 overs)	v	England; 160/5 (43.5 overs)
DB Vengsarkar 46 (85); DL Underwood 2/18 (10 overs)		MW Gatting 47* (68); RMH Binny 3/35 (7.5 overs)

England won by 5 wickets
Sardar Vallabhbhai Patel Stadium, Ahmedabad
Umpires: MV Gothoskar and SN Hanumantha Rao
Player of the match: MW Gatting (ENG)

- England won the toss and elected to field.
- The match was reduced from 50 overs to 46 overs per side.
- G Cook and CJ Richards (both ENG), and Randhir Singh, RJ Shastri and K Srikkanth (all IND) made their ODI debuts.
- This was the first one-day international played in India.

=== 2nd ODI ===
20 December 1981
Scorecard

England; 161/7 (36 overs)	v	India; 164/4 (35.3 overs)
MW Gatting 71* (58); Kapil Dev 2/26 (8 overs)		DB Vengsarkar 88* (107); GA Gooch 2/25 (7 overs)

India won by 6 wickets
Gandhi Stadium, Jalandhar
Umpires: JD Ghosh and S Kishen
Player of the match: DB Vengsarkar (IND)

- India won the toss and elected to field.
- The match was reduced before play started from 50 overs to 36 overs per side.
- SV Nayak (IND) made his ODI debut.

=== 3rd ODI ===
27 January 1982
Scorecard

England; 230/6 (46 overs)	v	India; 231/5 (42 overs)
KWR Fletcher 69 (52); SM Patil 2/53 (10 overs)		SM Gavaskar 71 (87); DL Underwood 3/48 (10 overs)

India won by 5 wickets
Barabati Stadium, Cuttack
Umpires: PR Punjabi and KB Ramaswami
Player of the match: SM Gavaskar (IND)

- India won the toss and elected to field.
- The match was reduced from 50 overs to 46 overs per side.
- J Arun Lal and AO Malhotra (both IND) made their ODI debuts.
