= Australian cricket team in India in 1979–80 =

International cricket tour

Australian cricket team in India in 1979
	India	Australia
- Dates: 1 September – 7 November 1979
Captains	Sunil Gavaskar	Kim Hughes

Test series
- Result: India won the 6-match series 2–0
Most runs	Gundappa Viswanath (518)	Kim Hughes (594)
Most wickets	Kapil Dev (28)	Geoff Dymock (24)

The Australian cricket team toured India in 1979 to play a six-match Test series against India.

India won the series 2–0. It was the last series played by an Australian side before the Australian Cricket Board and World Series Cricket made a compromise. It was the first time India had beaten Australia in a series.

== Australian squad ==
Australia had just lost the Ashes to England 5-1 and drawn against Pakistan 1-1 during the 1978–79 summer. They had also finished a poor 1979 World Cup campaign.

The squad selected by Ray Lindwall, Sam Loxton and Phil Ridings were as follows:

- Batsmen – Kim Hughes (captain), Andrew Hilditch (vice-captain), Allan Border, Rick Darling, Graham Yallop (also reserve wicketkeeper), Graeme Wood, Dav Whatmore
- Fast bowlers – Rodney Hogg, Graeme Porter, Alan Hurst, Geoff Dymock
- Spinners – Peter Sleep, Bruce Yardley, Jim Higgs
- Wicketkeepers – Kevin Wright
- Team officials – Bob Merriman (manager), Frank Hennessy (physio)

Before the season, ten of the players had never toured and none had gone to India.

=== Captaincy ===
Although Graham Yallop had captained Australia during the 1978–79 summer, he was replaced by Kim Hughes when injured, and when Yallop returned to the side, the Australian Cricket Board decided to persist with Hughes. They also elected Hilditch as vice captain rather than Yallop. However Yallop was kept as a selector.

On-tour selection panel: Hughes, Hilditch, Yallop.

=== Replacements ===
Alan Hurst suffered a back injury during the tour. On 12 October it was decided he would return home and Geoff Lawson was flown out as a replacement bowler during the tour.

=== World Series Cricket Backdrop ===
Before the tour took place, establishment cricket had "made up" with World Series Cricket and the 1979–80 Australian summer season was to be the first in three years with all players in the one competition. However, World Series Cricket players were not selected on the India tour. The players chosen to go to India could not play in the first round of the Sheffield Shield games, because the tour's schedule conflicted with those games.

== Tour ==
The Australian team left for Madras on 21 August.

An hour after the team left Singapore, an engine on their aeroplane failed, forcing them to return and causing them to arrive in India 22 hours behind schedule.

The Australians spent a week in Madras to acclimatise. After arriving at Madras, Rick Darling and Jim Higgs both fell sick with stomach ailments. However the mood was optimistic and the key players seemed in good form at practice sessions.

=== North Zone vs Australia ===
The first game of the tour was against North Zone in Srinagar, 1,600 miles from Madras. The ACB requested the game be relocated closer to Madras to reduce travel time and because Sringara was politically volatile due to the Kashmir situation, but this was knocked back as it was the first time a visiting test team had played in Kashmir and the advance tickets were selling well.

Rodney Hogg and Graeme Wood became ill and cancelled their appearances at the game. The Australians received death threats, so the security at the game was heavy.

Runs were scored by Hilditch (71), Hughes (70) and Yallop (83) with Hilditch and Rick Darling having a 75 run opening stand in 90 minutes. Hurst took 5-33 and Dymock 4-25 (twice dismissing Arun Lal – who scored 99 – on no balls). The game was drawn.

=== South Zone vs Australia ===
The next game took place against South Zone in Hyderabad. Hogg, Higgs and Sleep all took three wickets in South Zone's first innings. Allan Border scored 113 – his first decent score since his debut century against Pakistan – and Kevin Wright scored 52. The match was interrupted by rain and Australia were unable to force a victory, although Higgs and Sleep both picked up two extra wickets in South Zone's second innings.

Rodney Hogg had taken four wickets in all despite the crowd throwing several objects, including a lime and an onion (which he tossed back to it), at him, causing Hughes to call the police.

It was felt by contemporary reports that Higgs out-bowled Sleep. After Rick Darling was cut above the left eye while fielding, he was unable to bat. The selectors had wanted to experiment with Graeme Wood at six but Darling's injury meant Wood had to open. The game also saw Graeme Porter make his first class debut for Australia.

== First Test ==
11 – 16 September 1979
Scorecard

Australia	v	India
390 (143.4 overs); Allan Border 162 (360); Dilip Doshi 6/103 (43 overs)		425 (130.3 overs); Kapil Dev 83 (74); Jim Higgs 7/143 (41.3 overs)
212/7 (113.4 overs); Andrew Hilditch 55 (188); S Venkataraghavan 3/77 (45 overs)

Match drawn
Madras Cricket Club Ground, Madras
Umpires: Madhav Gothoskar and Swaroop Kishen

- Australia won the toss and elected to bat.
- 13 September was a rest day.
- Dilip Doshi (IND) made his Test debut.

Though Darling was the first choice opener with Wood as a backup, and either Wood or Dav Whatmore to bat at six, his digestive ailments and his eye injury had weakened him. Hughes wanted to take Dymock, Hurst and Hogg as pacemen into the test. Higgs was the only spinner. Eventually Darling was ruled out and Wood and Whatmore were selected, with Yardley as 12th man.

India kept a similar team to that which had played in England, with Dilip Doshi making his test debut. Australia began well with centuries to Border (162) and Hughes (100), who had a record third wicket partnership of 222. The other Australians batted less well (although several made starts), with Doshi taking 6–103. India scored 425 in reply, with Kapil Dev making 83 off 73 balls; Jim Higgs took 7–143. Hogg made 2-85. All the Australian bowlers struggled in the heat, and Higgs at times struggled to grip the ball; Hogg was also plagued with no balls. Border and Yallop both bowled and Yallop took a wicket.

Australia responded well in the second innings at first, with Hilditch and Border scoring half centuries as they went to 1–103. However a collapse saw Australia crash to 7–175. "When I got out I thought that was it", admitted Hughes later.

However Geoff Dymock and Rodney Hogg held out for an hour, then the match was washed out with rain and ended in a draw.

== Second Test ==
19 – 24 September 1979
Scorecard

Australia	v	India
333 (114.5 overs); Kim Hughes 86 (195); Shivlal Yadav 4/49 (22.5 overs)		457/5d (144 overs); Gundappa Viswanath 161* (297); Bruce Yardley 4/107 (44 overs)
77/3 (37.4 overs); Graeme Wood 30 (88); Shivlal Yadav 3/32 (15.4 overs)

Match drawn
M. Chinnaswamy Stadium, Bangalore
Umpires: Ram Punjabi and Kasturi Ramaswami

- Australia won the toss and elected to bat.
- 21 September was a rest day.
- Shivlal Yadav (IND) made his Test debut.

There were some doubts the second test would start as scheduled due to a monsoon.

Rick Darling replaced Whatmore in the side, with Wood dropping down to number six. Bruce Yardley came in for Dymock. Shivlav Ladal made his test debut for India.

Australia won the toss and batted, with Hilditch and Hughes scoring half centuries. However they collapsed to be 5–294 to 333 all out. India's innings was marked by problems involving Rodney Hogg, who threw a tantrum. Bob Merriman later announced that Hogg would not be disciplined for his behaviour.

Wood took Darling's place in the innings after Darling suffered a vomiting episode. Australia were 3–77 in reply, 47 behind India's first innings total, at tea on the fifth day, when a rain storm ended the game prematurely. Yadav ended up taking 7-87 for the match.

=== Australia vs Central Zone ===
Australia then travelled to Nagpur for a tour game against Central Zone. Peter Sleep threw his name into consideration with 5-71 and 61 not out; Darling (82) and Whatmore (60) also found form in a drawn game. Hogg however only took 1-39 and 1-13 and there were doubts raised about whether he should be picked – the first time this had happened in his career. "It's something new for him and it will be important for us to see how he handles it", said Hughes. However Hurst's back was playing up and he was advised to rest; this made Hogg's selection more imperative.

== Third Test ==
2 – 7 October 1979
Scorecard

India	v	Australia
271 (91 overs); Sunil Gavaskar 76 (175); Geoff Dymock 5/99 (35 overs)		304 (109.3 overs); Graham Yallop 89 (198); Karsan Ghavri 3/65 (23.3 overs)
311 (111.4 overs); Chetan Chauhan 84 (368); Geoff Dymock 7/67 (28.4 overs)		125 (60.2 overs); Dav Whatmore 33 (125); Kapil Dev 4/30 (16.2 overs)

India won by 153 runs
Green Park Stadium, Kanpur
Umpires: Mohammad Ghouse (Ind) and S. N. Hanumantha Rao (Ind)

- India won the toss and chose to bat.
- 5 October was taken as a rest day.

Australia kept faith with Hogg for the third test, bringing in Dymock to replace Hurst. India won the toss and elected to bat; they were 1-201 but the Australian attack fired and they were dismissed for 271, Dymock taking 5-99 and Hogg 4-66 (though he was still no balled 13 times in 15 overs). Darling had more health issues, injuring his shoulder while fielding and having to leave the ground; it turned out to be sprained, and Darling batted down the order, with Bruce Yardley opening.

Australia were unable to press the advantage although they managed to score 304, led by Yallop (89), Hughes (50) and Darling (59); for a time it seemed Darling was not going to be able to bat but he decided to try and ended up lasting three hours.

India batted well in their second innings making 311. Dymock took 7/67 but Australia dropped a number of key catches which later proved crucial.

Australia were set the task of getting 279 in 310 minutes. Allan Border was suffering from flu so Yallop batted at three (Border came in at six). The Australians collapsed and were all out for 125, Dev and Yadav taking four wickets each.

Bruce Yardley was injured when Dev hit him in the left foot with a yorker.

=== Australia vs West Zone ===
The next game was against West Zone. Hughes scored 126 but the rest of the batsmen failed. West Zone were dismissed for 217 with Sleep and Higgs taking three wickets each – and Graeme Wood a career-best 3–18. Australia made 9–143 in their second innings (Whatmore 41), then Border and Higgs each took three wickets as they almost bowled Australia to victory, the game ending with West Zone 7-95.

Alan Hurst had returned to the Australian side for the game but it became apparent the injury was getting worse. It was decided that he should be sent home after the fourth test and be replaced by Geoff Lawson. Bob Merriman said Hurst was "bitterly disappointed" that he could not play.

== Fourth Test ==
13 – 18 October 1979
(5–day match)
Scorecard

India	v	Australia
510/7d (144.2 overs); Gundappa Viswanath 131 (207); Geoff Dymock 4/135 (42.2 overs)		298 (106.3 overs); Dav Whatmore 77 (91); Kapil Dev 5/82 (32 overs)
		413 (f/o) (151.3 overs); AMJ Hilditch 85 (162); KD Ghavri 3/74 (30 overs)

Match drawn
Feroz Shah Kotla Ground, Delhi
Umpires: PR Punjabi and KB Ramaswami

- India won the toss and elected to bat.
- 15 October was taken as a rest day.

Australia replaced Bruce Yardley with Peter Sleep. Gavaskar (dropped on 13), Viswanath and Sharma all scored centuries as India made 7–510, with Dymock taking 4–135.

India enforced the follow on. Australia managed to bat to safety with a total of 413 with good innings from Hilditch (85), Hughes (40), Border (46), Whatmore (54) and Sleep (64). The partnership of Whatmore and Sleep in particular – 76 off 102 minutes – was especially crucial. Both Wright and Higgs were severely ill due to stomach ailments.

Hughes called this effort "the best all-round team effort" in any team he had played for.

=== East Zone vs Australia ===
Australia played East Zone in Kolkata with Geoff Lawson joining the team.

Australia scored 5-160 (Yallop 81 not out) when Hughes, unhappy with the pitch (which he thought was the "worst he had ever played on"), declared; East Zone were dismissed for 126 in return; Australia were 8-119 when Hughes declared again. They had tea fifty minutes later. This gave East Zone a day and a half to score 153 runs. East Zone were 4–111 by the end of that day and ended up winning the game by four wickets (two catches were dropped).

== Fifth Test ==
26 – 31 October 1979
Scorecard

Australia	v	India
442 (153 overs); Graham Yallop 167 (392); Kapil Dev 5/74 (32 overs)		347 (125.4 overs); Gundappa Viswanath 96 (177); Bruce Yardley 4/91 (42 overs)
151/6d (57.3 overs); Kim Hughes 64* (120); Shivlal Yadav 2/16 (11 overs)		200/4 (63.2 overs); Yashpal Sharma 85* (117); Geoff Dymock 4/63 (25 overs)

Match drawn
Eden Gardens, Calcutta
Umpires: SN Hanumantha Rao and S Kishen

- Australia won the toss and elected to bat.
- 29 October was taken as a rest day.

Australia made only one change for the fifth test team, bringing Bruce Yardley back for Peter Sleep. The Australians were reluctant to use a still-injured Yardley until he demonstrated at the Eden Gardens pitch that he was still capable.

Australia batted extremely well in their first innings, making 442 thanks to Yallop (167) (as opener), Hughes (92), Border (54), and Yardley (61). India managed 347 in reply, collapsing from 2–256 with Yardley getting 4-91.

Australia were 5–81 in reply in one stage, in danger of losing, but Hughes started hitting out and Australia added 70 in 72 minutes. Hughes declared (he was on 64 not out), leaving India to get 246 runs in 247 minutes. Geoff Dymock took four wickets and at one stage India were 4-123 but Yashpal Sharma and Rao dug in and the game ended drawn, with them 4–200.

== Sixth Test ==
3 – 7 November 1979
Scorecard

India	v	Australia
458/8d (149 overs); Sunil Gavaskar 123 (239); Rodney Hogg 2/53 (28 overs)		160 (61.5 overs); Graham Yallop 60 (125); Dilip Doshi 5/43 (19.5 overs)
		198 (f/o) (73.1 overs); Kim Hughes 80 (144); Kapil Dev 4/39 (14.1 overs)

India won by an innings and 100 runs
Wankhede Stadium, Bombay
Umpires: JD Ghosh and MI Ghouse

- India won the toss and elected to bat.
- 5 November was taken as a rest day.
- The match was scheduled for five days but completed in four.

Australia made one change for the sixth test, bringing back Sleep for Bruce Yardley, after the latter failed a fitness test. India won the toss and decided to bat, making 8–458, with both Gavaskar and Kirmani scoring centuries. Graham Yallop and Sleep both had to leave the ground during the day due to illness.

Australia were dismissed for 160, with only Yallop (60) offering much resistance.

Australia were 2–149 in their second innings (Border 61, Hughes 80) but then collapsed to be all out for 198 and lost by an innings and 100 runs. Wisden later called Hughes' knock "one of the finest innings played against Indian bowling in recent times."

During the second innings, Dev felled Rick Darling with a bouncer, causing him to be retired hurt.

== Summary ==
Hughes thought key problems were the Australians' failures to get off to a good start and make important catches. Back in Australia, the next test played was against the West Indies. Eight of the twelve players selected were from World Series Cricket, including Greg Chappell as captain, but Hughes, Border, Hogg and Dymock were kept in the side and Hughes was appointed vice-captain.
