= Sri Lankan cricket team in India in 1982–83 =

International cricket tour

Sri Lankan cricket team in India in 1982
	India	Sri Lanka
- Dates: 12 – 22 September 1982
Captains	Sunil Gavaskar; Kapil Dev	Bandula Warnapura

Test series
- Result: 1-match series drawn 0–0
Most runs	Sandeep Patil	Duleep Mendis
Most wickets	Kapil Dev; Dilip Doshi	Ashantha de Mel
- Player of the series: Duleep Mendis

One Day International series
- Results: India won the 3-match series 3–0
Most runs	Kris Srikkanth	Roy Dias
Most wickets	Dilip Doshi	Bandula Warnapura; Ajit de Silva; Ashantha de Mel

In the 1982–83 cricket season, the Sri Lankan national cricket team toured to India to play the Indian national cricket team. The tour included one Test match. That match was drawn. Three players scored centuries; Duleep Mendis scored 105 in both Sri Lankan innings, and Sunil Gavaskar and Sandeep Patil scored 155 and 144 respectively, both in India's first innings. Three players took a five-wicket haul in the game; Dilip Doshi took five wickets for 85 runs in Sri Lanka's first innings, Kapil Dev took five wickets for 110 runs and Ashantha de Mel took five wickets for 68 runs.

The series also included a three-match One Day International (ODI) series. The first ODI, at Gandhi Sports Complex Ground, Amritsar, was won by India by a margin of 78 runs. The man of the match was Dilip Doshi, who four wickets for 44 runs of ten overs. The second ODI was at Feroz Shah Kotla, Delhi. The match was won by India by six wickets, with the Indian player Kris Srikkanth winning the man of the match award after scoring 95 runs. The third and final ODI, held at the Karnataka State Cricket Association Stadium, Bangalore was won by India by a margin of six wickets. Srikkanth scored 92, therefore he received his second man of the match award for the series in a match that completed a series white wash by India. The top scorer in the series was Sri Lankan Roy Dias, who scored two centuries in a series his country didn't win a match in. The top wicket-taker was Dilip Doshi, who took six wickets. The top four highest wicket takers were all Indians, with Doshi taking six; Kapil Dev and Madan Lal taking five; and Roger Binny taking four. Three Sri Lankans took three wickets; Bandula Warnapura, Ajit de Silva and Ashantha de Mel.

== Background ==
Before the tour, only one ODI match had been played between the countries and no test matches had been played. That one ODI was in the 1979 Cricket World Cup, held in England, so the 1982–83 tour was the first series between the two countries. The 1979 match was a 60 over match that was held over three days; the first day was one innings, the second day was a rest day and the third day was the second team's inning. The match was won by Sri Lanka with a winning margin of 47 runs. Both teams didn't progress out of group B to the semi-finals.

In the two years before the Sri Lankan cricket team's tour to India in 1982–83, India played 15 test matches and 17 ODIs. Of the 15 test matches, India won two matches, drew ten matches and lost three matches. The team won 5 of their ODIs in the period and lost the other 12. Comparably, in the same time period, Sri Lanka played four tests, of which they lost three and drew one. Sri Lanka also played five ODIs, of which, they won two and lost three.

== Squads ==
The following players represented India in at least one Test or One-day International during the 1982–83 tour:

(India)	Indian squad	(India)
1 SM Gavaskar *_{Test} · 2 J Arun Lal · 3 DB Vengsarkar · 4 GR Viswanath · 5 SM Patil · 6 Y Sharma · 7 N Kapil Dev *_{ODI} · 8 S Madan Lal · 9 SMH Kirmani † 10 RC Shukla · 11 DR Doshi · 12 RMH Binny · 13 K Srikkanth · 14 AO Malhotra · 15 M Amarnath

The following players represented Sri Lanka on the 1982–83 tour of India:

(Sri Lanka)	Sri Lankan squad	(Sri Lanka)
1 B Warnapura * · 2 HM Goonatilleke † · 3 RL Dias · 4 LRD Mendis · 5 A Ranatunga · 6 RS Madugalle · 7 AN Ranasinghe · 8 DS de Silva · 9 JR Ratnayeke 10 ALF de Mel · 11 GRA de Silva · 12 S Wettimuny · 13 VB John

Key: *=Captain, †=Wicket-keeper

== Test series ==
=== Only Test ===
17 – 22 September
Scorecard

Sri Lanka	v	India
346 (92.5 overs); Duleep Mendis 105 (123); Dilip Doshi 5/85 (30 overs)		6/566 declared (131 overs); Sunil Gavaskar 155 (293); Ashantha de Mel 2/133 (29 overs)
394 (96.3 overs); Duleep Mendis 105 (236); Kapil Dev 5/110 (24.3 overs)		7/135 (28 overs); Sandeep Patil 46 (balls faced unknown); Ashantha de Mel 5/68 (14 overs)

Match drawn
MA Chidambaram Stadium
Umpires: Madhav Gothoskar (IND) and Swaroop Kishen (IND)
Player of the match: Duleep Mendis

- Sri Lanka won the toss and elected to bat
- This was the first Test match between Sri Lanka and India
- Arun Lal and Rakesh Shukla (both India) made their Test debuts.

The first and only test in the series started when the Sri Lankan captain, Bandula Warnapura, won the toss and elected to bat on 17 September 1982. The match, played at MA Chidambaram Stadium, started badly for Sri Lanka when they lost their first two wickets for only 11 runs with Warnapura scoring four and, fellow opener, Mahes Goonatilleke making seven. For the third-wicket partnership, Duleep Mendis and Roy Dias put on 153 runs before Dias was dismissed leg before wicket (LBW) for 60. The next batsman who lost their wicket was Dias, who scored 105 off 123 balls. By that time Sri Lanka was on 204 runs. Arjuna Ranatunga and Anura Ranasinghe were both dismissed when Sri Lanka was on 205. Ranatunga made 25 and Ranasinghe made 0 (also known as a duck). The Sri Lankan number six and eight batsmen both made scores in the forties. Ranjan Madugalle and Somachandra de Silva put on a seventh-wicket partnership of 77 runs before Madugalle was dismissed for 46. De Silva was out for 49 when Sri Lanka had a score of eight wickets for 304 runs. Sri Lankas innings ended 44 runs later when Ajit de Silva was dismissed for a duck. Ashantha de Mel was left not out as Sri Lanka was bowled out for 346 runs of 92.5 overs. Of the five Indians to bowl in the innings, three of them took wickets. Dilip Doshi took five wickets for 85 runs, Kapil Dev took three wickets for 97 runs and Madan Lal took two wickets for 72 runs.

In reply to Sri Lanka's 346, India made a good start when their two openers made a first-wicket partnership of 156. The partnership ended when Arun Lal was dismissed for 63 runs. The second-wicket partnership between Sunil Gavaskar and Dilip Vengsarkar was even bigger than the first-wicket one. Their stand of 173 ended when number three Vengsarkar, was run out for 90. By the stage of the fourth batsmen's dismissal India was three wickets for 347 runs, already one run ahead of Sri Lanka. The fourth batsmen to fall was Gavaskar who scored 155 off 293 balls. The next partnership was an even 50 between Sandeep Patil and Yashpal Sharma. India was on 403 when Sharma was dismissed for 17. Kapil Dev was India's seventh batsmen and he made an 85 run stand with Patil before Dev was dismissed for 31. Madan Lal and Patil batted until India was six wickets for 556 runs. At that point Indian captain Gavaskar declared. Patil made 114 not out and Lal made 37 not out. Sri Lankan captain Warnapura tried seven bowlers, of which, only three took wickets. Those wicket-takers were Ashantha de Mel, Somachandra de Silva and Ravi Ratnayeke. De Mel took two wickets for 133, de Silva took two wickets for 162 runs and Ratnayeke took one wicket for 75 runs.

Sri Lanka's second inning started in the same ways their first one did. That is, Bandula Warnapura was out for six. Roy Dias and Ravi Ratnayeke made a second-wicket partnership of 41 before Ratnayeke, who had been promoted up the batting order from ninth to opener, was caught for six. Dias and Duleep Mendis again made a century partnership, this time they made 110 together before Dias was dismissed for 97, his second half century for the match. By the time Sri Lanka reached five wickets for 202 runs, Arjuna Ranatunga and Ranjan Madugalle had both been dismissed, Ranatunga for 15 and Madugalle for four. Mendis and Ranasinghe put on a spirited fightback for the sixth-wicket partnership. They had scored 89 runs together when Mendis was dismissed for 105. The seventh-wicket partnership between Ranasinghe and Somachandra de Silva was worth 49 runs. Ranasinghe was dismissed for 70 which was a polar opposite to his duck in the first innings. At the time of Ranasinghe's dismissal Sri Lanka were seven wickets for 340 runs. The last four batsmen batted around de Silva, who made 46 not out, and got Sri Lanka to 394 of 96.3 overs. Only four Indian's bowled in the innings. They were Kapil Dev, Madan Lal, Dilip Doshi and Rakesh Shukla. Dev took five wickets for 110 runs, Doshi took three wickets for 147 runs, Shukla took two wickets for 82 runs and Lal took no wickets for 43 runs.

To win the test match, India required 175 runs. Arun Lal was out for one run and Dilip Vengsarkar was out for five runs. At this stage India was two wickets for 16 runs. Sandeep Patil and Kapil Dev put on 62 runs in 52 balls for the third-wicket. While attempting to take two runs to long off, Patil and Kapil Dev ended up on the same end, and Patil was run out for 46 in 33 balls. Kapil edged de Mel to the wicket keeper for 30 in 37 balls. At that stage, India were four wickets for 90 runs, still trailing Sri Lanka by 85 runs. Gundappa Viswanath was next out when he was dismissed for two runs. Yashpal Sharma and Madan Lal put on 31 runs before Lal was dismissed for nine runs. Five runs later, Syed Kirmani was dismissed five and India was seven wickets for 130 runs. Sunil Gavasker and Sharma had scored five runs together when the ninetieth and final over of the fifth and final day was bowled. India finished seven wickets for 135 runs. India fell 40 runs short of winning and Sri Lanka still needed to take three wickets to win and, therefore, the match was drawn. The bowler that caused the most match in India's second inning was Ashantha de Mel who took five wickets for 68 runs. The two other bowlers who bowled in the inning were Ravi Ratnayeke (no wickets for 36 runs) and Somachandra de Silva (one wicket for 29 runs).

== ODI series ==
=== First ODI ===
12 September
Scorecard

India; 7/269 (46 overs)	v	Sri Lanka; 8/191 (46 overs)
Kris Srikkanth 57 (43); Bandula Warnapura 2/41 (10 overs)		Sidath Wettimuny 43 (60); Dilip Doshi 4/44 (10 overs)

India won by 78 runs
Gandhi Sports Complex Ground, Amritsar
Umpires: Rajan Mehra (IND) & Ram Punjabi (IND)
Player of the match: Dilip Doshi

- Sri Lanka won the toss and elected to field
- Both innings were shortened from 50 to 46 overs due to rain
- Vinothen John (SL) made his ODI debut.

The first ODI of the three game ODI series was held on 12 September. Sri Lanka won the loss and elected to field. India's openers, Kris Srikkanth and Roger Binny, made a first-wicket stand of 62 runs before Binny was dismissed for 16. Srikkanth and Dilip Vengsarkar took India to one wicket for 95 runs before Vengsarkar was caught out for 23. Srikkanth was dismissed 34 runs later for 57. Sandeep Patil and Ashok Malhotra made 33 runs together until Patil was dismissed LBW for 15. Malhotra was out 11 runs later for 40. At that stage India were five wickets for 173 runs. Kapil Dev and Yashpal Sharma came together and made 68 runs. Dev was dismissed for 49 and then Mohinder Amarnath for 13. Armarnath's dismissal brought the end of the match as rain had meant that four overs were not played for each team. Sharma made 37 runs not out as India finished seven wickets for 269 runs. Five Sri Lanka's took wickets in the innings. Bandula Warnapura took two wickets for 41 runs, Somachandra de Silva took two wickets for 49 runs, Anura Ranasinghe took one wicket for 21 runs, Vinothen John took one wicket for 44 runs and Ashantha de Mel made one wicket for 58 runs.

Requiring 269 runs off 46 overs to win, Sri Lanka made a bad start to their innings when Bandula Warnapura was bowled for a duck when Sri Lanka was only on eight runs. For the third-wicket, Sidath Wettimuny and Roy Dias made 59 runs. Dias was dismissed for 39. Wettimuny and Duleep Mendis put on 28 runs together before Wettimuny was dismissed for 43. Three runs later Ranjan Madugalle was caught out for one. Mendis was joined by Anura Ranasinghe and the pair put on 57 together before Ranasinghe was dismissed for 35. Ashantha de Mel was demised three runs later and, at that stage, Sri Lanka were 6 wickets for 158 runs. Mendis and Somachandra de Silva made seventh-wicket partnership of eight. Mendis was out for 33 and his dismissal brought Sri Lanka seven wickets for 166 runs, still trailing India by 103 runs. De Silva fell when Sri Lanka was on 175 runs. Mahes Goonatilleke and Ravi Ratnayeke batted out the innings together. At the end of 46 overs, Sri Lanka was 78 runs behind India's score and therefore lost the match. Dilip Doshi took the most wickets, taking four wickets for 44 runs. Three other bowlers took a wicket. They were Mohinder Amarnath (two wickets for 50 runs), Kapil Dev (no wicket for nine runs) and Madan Lal (one wicket for 24 runs).

=== Second ODI ===
15 September
Scorecard

Sri Lanka; 8/277 (50 overs)	v	India; 4/281 (40.5 overs)
Roy Dias 102 (114); Roger Binny 3/39 (7 overs)		Kris Srikkanth 95 (66); Ajit de Silva 1/36 (5.5 overs)

India won by six wickets
Feroz Shah Kotla, Delhi
Umpires: Bhairab Ganguli (IND) & SN Hanumantha Rao (IND)
Player of the match: Kris Srikkanth

- Sri Lanka won the toss and elected to bat

Despite losing the first ODI, Sri Lanka, once again, chose to bat after winning the toss. The second ODI started badly when Bandula Warnapura was out for four runs. This was the Sri Lankan captain Warnapura's fourth score under ten on the tour in as many matches. Sidath Wettimuny and Roy Dias made 170 runs for the second wicket, taking Sri Lanka to two wickets for 180 runs, before Wettimuny was caught for 74. Duleep Mendis was out for ten shortly after. The next batsmen to fall was Dias who made 102 off 144 balls. Eleven runs after Dias was dismissed, Ravi Ratnayeke was out for two and then, without Sri Lanka scoring another run, Anura Ranasinghe was bowled for 20. Ranjan Madugalle and Ashantha de Mel put on 11 runs for the seventh wicket before Madugalle was out for seven. When de Mel fell for 28, Sri Lanka were eight wickets for 269 runs. Ajit de Silva and Mahes Goonatilleke batted out the innings. Sri Lanka made 277 runs for eight wickets off 50 overs. Vinothen John did not bat. The leading Indian wicket taker was Roger Binny, who took three wickets for 39 runs.

=== Third ODI ===
26 September
Scorecard

Sri Lanka; 8/233 (50 overs)	v	India; 4/234 (39.2 overs)
Roy Dias 121 (144); Dilip Doshi 2/35 (10 overs)		Kris Srikkanth 92 (83); Ashantha de Mel 2/58 (8 overs)

India won by six wickets
Karnataka State Cricket Association Stadium, Bangalore
Umpires: Dara Dotiwalla (IND) & Kasturi Ramaswami (IND)
Player of the match: Kris Srikkanth

- Sri Lanka won the toss and elected to bat
- Rumesh Ratnayake (SL) made his ODI debut.
