= West Indian cricket team in India in 1983–84 =

International cricket tour

West Indies cricket team in India in 1983–84 (Revenge Series)
- Date: 4 October – 31 December 1983
- Location: India
- Result: West Indies won the 6-Test series 3–0; West Indies won the ODI series 5-0
- Player of the series: Kapil Dev; Malcolm Marshall
Teams
- West Indies: India
Captains
- Clive Lloyd: Kapil Dev
Most runs
- Clive Lloyd (497) Gordon Greenidge (411) Jeff Dujon (367): Sunil Gavaskar (505); Dilip Vengsarkar (425); Ravi Shastri (336)
Most wickets
- Malcolm Marshall (33) Michael Holding (30) Wayne Daniel (14) Winston Davis (14): Kapil Dev (29); Ravi Shastri (12); Maninder Singh (10)

The West Indies cricket team embarked on a tour of India in 1983–84 following their surprise defeat to India in 1983 World Cup. Captained by Clive Lloyd, the West Indies played six Test matches against India as well as five ODI in addition to other first class matches. The series also known as Revenge Series ended with West Indies winning three tests and winning all the five ODIs. The series displayed Indian batsmen struggling to play against the West Indies pace attack. In most of the matches India lost about 4-5 wickets even before reaching 50 runs. The disastrous 3-0 loss was the widest ever margin of defeat on home soil. Despite the poor performance of Indian players, India did manage to create some records in this series. Kapil Dev produced his career best innings spell in this series of 9 wickets in an innings for 83 runs and Gavaskar scored his career best 236 not out in this series. This knock of 236 runs not out took him past Donald Bradman's record of 29 test hundreds and Vinoo Mankad's record score of 231.

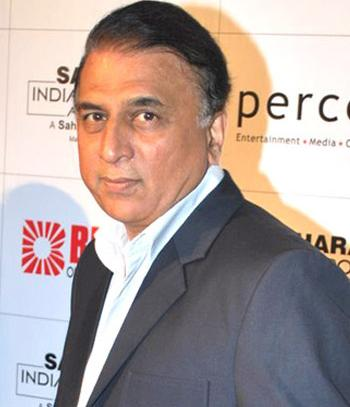
Sunil Gavaskar

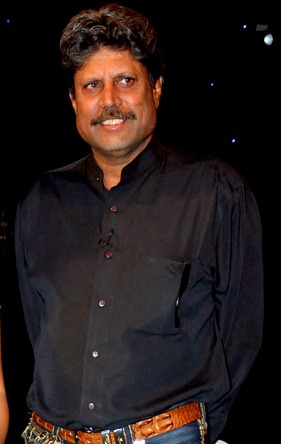
Kapil Dev

Both Sunil Gavaskar and Kapil Dev had their career best performance in this series.

There were various other highlights in these series. In the 5th Test, the crowds upset with India's poor performance blamed Sunil Gavaskar and he was pelted with stones and rotten fruits. The first ODI of this series played at Srinagar was the first ever international match played there. The host team was constantly booed by a section of the crowd. There were protests by separatists who dug up the pitch during the lunch break. This series saw debuts by Richie Richardson, Roger Harper, Chetan Sharma, Navjot Sidhu and Raju Kulkarni. Andy Roberts and Yashpal Sharma went into retirement after playing their last matches in this series. The third Test at Gujarat Stadium in Ahmedabad was the first test match ever played on this ground. After the sixth Test, total wickets taken by Malcolm Marshall was 33 wickets which equalled the West Indian record for most wickets in a series. In the same Test, Winston Davis was struck by a missile thrown by a spectator which led to captain Clive Lloyd pulling out his team back to pavilion. The match was resumed only after Lloyd received assurances from the state Governor that security would be increased.

== Squads ==
(Cricket West Indies) West Indies team	(India) Indian team
(Guyana) Clive Lloyd (c)	Kapil Dev (c)
(Barbados) Gordon Greenidge	Sunil Gavaskar
(Barbados) Desmond Haynes	Dileep Vengsarkar
(Antigua and Barbuda) Viv Richards(vc)	Mohinder Amarnath
(Antigua and Barbuda) Richie Richardson	Sandeep Patil
(Trinidad and Tobago) Gus Logie	Anshuman Gaekwad
(Jamaica) Jeff Dujon (wk)	Syed Kirmani (wk)
(Trinidad and Tobago) Larry Gomes	Ravi Shastri
(Guyana) Roger Harper	Ashok Malhotra
(Antigua and Barbuda) Eldine Baptiste	Madan Lal
(Jamaica) Michael Holding	Roger Binny
(Barbados) Malcolm Marshall	Sandhu
(Barbados) Wayne Daniel	Kirti Azad
(Antigua and Barbuda) Andy Roberts	Maninder Singh
(Trinidad and Tobago) Larry Gomes	Shivlal Yadav
(Guyana) Milton Pydanna	Yashpal Sharma
(Saint Vincent and the Grenadines) Winston Davis	Raghuram Bhat

== Test matches ==
Date	Match, venue	Results, Highlights
21 Oct – 25 Oct	1st Test, Green Park Stadium, Kanpur	West Indies won by an innings and 83 runs.
29 Oct – 3 Nov	2nd Test, Feroz Shah Kotla, Delhi	Match ended in a draw. Yashpal Sharma's last Test match
12 Nov – 16 Nov	3rd Test, Gujarat Stadium, Ahmedabad	West Indies won by 138 runs. Career best performance by Kapil Dev. 9 wickets for 83 runs in a single innings. Test debut by Sidhu. Gursharan Singh who substituted for Roger Binny took four catches, becoming the first substitute to do so.
24 Nov – 29 Nov	4th Test, Wankhede Stadium, Bombay	Match ended in a draw. Test debut by Richie Richardson.
10 Dec – 14 Dec	5th Test Eden Gardens, Calcutta	West Indies won by an innings and 46 runs. Test debut by Roger Harper.
24 Dec – 29 Dec	6th Test M. A. Chidambaram Stadium, Madras	Match ended in a draw. Career best 236 not out by Sunil Gavaskar. Last test match of Andy Roberts.

=== First Test ===
21–25 October 1983
Scorecard

West Indies	v	India
454 (138.2 overs); Gordon Greenidge 194 (368); Kapil Dev 4/99 (24.2 overs)		207 (59.4 overs); Madan Lal 63* (101); Malcolm Marshall 4/19 (15 overs)
		164 (58.3 overs) f/o Dilip Vengsarkar 65 (96); Malcolm Marshall 4/47 (17 overs)

West Indies won by an innings and 83 runs
Green Park Stadium, Kanpur
Umpires: Bhairab Ganguli (Ind) and Swaroop Kishen (Ind)
Player of the match: Malcolm Marshall (WI)

- West Indies won the toss and elected to bat.
- Eldine Baptiste (WI) made his Test debut.
- Gordon Greenidge (WI) passed 3,000 runs in Tests.

=== Second Test ===
29 October–3 November 1983
Scorecard

India	v	West Indies
464 (122.1 overs); Dilip Vengsarkar 159 (238); Michael Holding 4/107 (28.1 overs)		384 (127.5 overs); Clive Lloyd 103 (202); Kapil Dev 6/77 (31 overs)
233 (77.1 overs); Dilip Vengsarkar 63; Wayne Daniel 3/38 (15 overs)		120/2 (50 overs); Gordon Greenidge 72; Ravi Shastri 2/36 (17 overs)

Match drawn
Feroz Shah Kotla, New Delhi
Umpires: Dara Dotiwalla (Ind) and Madhav Gothoskar (Ind)
Player of the match: Dilip Vengsarkar (Ind)

- India won the toss and elected to bat.
- Sunil Gavaskar (Ind) passed 8,000 runs in Tests.
- 31 October was a rest day.

=== Third Test ===
12–16 November 1983
Scorecard

West Indies	v	India
281 (104.3 overs); Jeff Dujon 98 (154); Maninder Singh 4/19 (15 overs)		241 (80.5 overs); Gavaskar 90 (120); Wayne Daniel 5/39 (11.5 overs)
201 (60.3 overs); Michael Holding 58; Kapil Dev 9/83 (30.3 overs)		103 (47.1 overs); Anshuman Gaekwad 29 (72); Michael Holding 4/30 (17 overs)

West Indies won by 138 runs
Gujarat Stadium, Ahmedabad
Umpires: S. N. Hanumantha Rao (Ind) and Kasturi Ramaswami (Ind)
Player of the match: Michael Holding (WI)

- India won the toss and elected to field.
- Navjot Sidhu (Ind) made his Test debut.
- 15 November was a rest day.

In the Indian second innings, six batsman scored just one run each.

=== Fourth Test ===
24–29 November 1983
Scorecard

India	v	West Indies
463 (142.5 overs); Dilip Vengsarkar 100 (201); Michael Holding 5/102 (40.5 overs)		393 (146.1 overs); Viv Richards 120; Shivlal Yadav 5/131 (44.1 overs)
173/5d (46 overs); Ashok Malhotra 72(122); Wayne Daniel 1/45 (14 overs)		104/4 (51 overs); Larry Gomes 37; Ravi Shastri 2/32 (13 overs)

Match drawn
Wankhede Stadium, Bombay
Umpires: Swaroop Kishen (Ind) and Madhav Gothoskar (Ind)
Player of the match: Viv Richards (WI)

- India won the toss and elected to bat.
- Richie Richardson (WI) made his Test debut.
- 25 November was a rest day.

=== Fifth Test ===
10–14 December 1983
Scorecard

India	v	West Indies
241 (87.4 overs); Kapil Dev 69 (79); Andy Roberts 3/56 (23.4 overs)		377 (128 overs); Clive Lloyd 161 (290); Kapil Dev 4/91 (35 overs)
90 (30 overs); Ashok Malhotra 30; Malcolm Marshall 6/37 (15 overs)

West Indies won by an innings and 46 runs
Eden Garden, Calcutta
Umpires: Madhav Gothoskar (Ind) and Swaroop Kishen (Ind)
Player of the match: Clive Lloyd (WI)

- India won the toss and elected to bat.
- Roger Harper (WI) made his Test debut.
- Ravi Shastri (Ind) passed 1,000 runs in Tests.
- Andy Roberts (WI) became the third West Indies player to claim 200 wickets in Tests.
- Clive Lloyd and Andy Roberts set a record for the highest ninth wicket partnership for West Indies in Tests.
- 13 December was a rest day.

=== Sixth Test ===
24–29 December 1983
Scorecard

West Indies	v	India
313 (112.3 overs); Jeff Dujon 62 (169); Maninder Singh 3/41 (29.3 overs)		451/8d (160 overs); Sunil Gavaskar 236* (425); Malcolm Marshall 5/72 (26 overs)
64/1 (23 overs); Gordon Greenidge 26*; Ravi Shastri 1/10 (6 overs)

Match drawn
M. A. Chidambaram Stadium, Madras
Umpires: M. G. Subramaniam (Ind) and S. Kishen (Ind)
Player of the match: Sunil Gavaskar (Ind)

- No play was possible on day 1 due to rain.
- West Indies won the toss and elected to bat.
- 25 December was a rest day.
- Shivlal Yadav (Ind) picked his 50th wicket in Tests.
- Sunil Gavaskar (Ind) became the first batsman to score three double centuries against the West Indies.
- Andy Roberts played his final ODI match.
- West Indies won the series 3-0.

== ODIs ==
Match	Date	Venue	Results, Highlights
1st ODI	13 Oct 1983	Sher-i-Kashmir Stadium, Srinagar	First international match at Srinagar. West Indies won by 28 runs. West Indies innings was cut short by a dust storm and bad light
2nd ODI	9 Nov 1983	Moti Bagh Stadium, Baroda	West Indies won by 4 wickets
3rd ODI	1 Dec 1983	Nehru Stadium, Indore	West Indies won by 8 wickets.
4th ODI	7 Dec 1983	Keenan Stadium, Jamshedpur	West Indies won by 104 runs. ODI debut by Chetan Sharma.Highest partnership in India by West Indies 221, made by Vivian Richards and Gordon Greenidge
5th ODI	17 Dec 1983	Nehru Stadium, Gauhati	West Indies won by 6 wickets. ODI debut by Raju Kulkarni and Richie Richardson.

The West Indies won the Charminar Challenge Cup 5-0.

=== 1st ODI ===
13 October 1983
Scorecard

India; 176 (41.2 overs)	v	West Indies; 108/0 (22.4 overs)
K Srikkanth 40 (91); RA Harper 3/34 (9 overs)		DL Haynes 55* (88)

West Indies won by 26 runs ("countback" rain rule)
Sher-i-Kashmir Stadium, Srinagar
Umpires: JD Ghosh and MI Ghouse
Player of the match: DL Haynes (WIN)

- West Indies won the toss and elected to field.
- The match was reduced before play started from 50 overs to 45 overs per side.
- When play was halted West Indies needed to have scored 81 runs from their first 22 overs to win.
- EAE Baptiste and RA Harper (WIN) made his ODI debut.

=== 2nd ODI ===
9 November 1983
Scorecard

India; 214/6 (49 overs)	v	West Indies; 217/6 (47.5 overs)
RJ Shastri 65 (125); HA Gomes 2/17 (3 overs)		CG Greenidge 63 (114); Kapil Dev 2/38 (8.5 overs)

West Indies won by 4 wickets
Moti Bagh Stadium, Vadodara
Umpires: S Banerjee and VK Ramaswamy
Player of the match: CG Greenidge (WIN)

- India won the toss and elected to bat.
- The match was reduced before from 50 overs to 49 overs per side.

=== 3rd ODI ===
1 December 1983
Scorecard

India; 240/7 (47 overs)	v	West Indies; 241/2 (45.2 overs)
M Amarnath 55 (122); RA Harper 2/55 (10 overs)		CG Greenidge 96 (127); Kapil Dev 1/41 (9.2 overs)

West Indies won by 8 wickets
Nehru Stadium, Indore
Umpires: MY Gupte and RV Ramani
Player of the match: CG Greenidge (WIN)

- India won the toss and elected to bat.
- The match was reduced before from 50 overs to 47 overs per side.

=== 4th ODI ===
7 December 1983
Scorecard

West Indies; 333/8 (45 overs)	v	India; 229/5 (45 overs)
IVA Richards 149 (99); Kapil Dev 3/44 (9 overs)		SM Gavaskar 83 (107); AME Roberts 3/54 (10 overs)

West Indies won by 104 runs
Keenan Stadium, Jamshedpur
Umpires: PG Pandit and SR Ramchandra Rao
Player of the match: IVA Richards (WIN)

- India won the toss and elected to field.
- The match was reduced before play started from 50 to 45 overs per side.
- C Sharma (IND) made his ODI debut.
- Andy Roberts played his final ODI match.

=== 5th ODI ===
17 December 1983
Scorecard

India; 178/7 (44 overs)	v	West Indies; 182/4 (41.4 overs)
GA Parkar 42 (50); EAE Baptiste 2/31 (9 overs)		RB Richardson 46 (57); RJ Shastri 2/19 (9 overs)

West Indies won by 6 wickets
Nehru Stadium, Guwahati
Umpires: R Mrithyunjayan and AL Narasimhan
Player of the match: GA Parkar (IND)

- West Indies won the toss and elected to field.
- The match was reduced before play started from 50 overs to 45 overs per side. It was further reduced to 44 overs per side.
- RR Kulkarni (IND) and RB Richardson (WIN) made their ODI debuts.

== First-class matches ==
Date	Match, venue	Results, Remarks
4 Oct – 6 Oct	Central Zone v West Indians, Sawai Mansingh Stadium, Jaipur	Match drawn.
8 Oct – 10 Oct	South Zone v West Indians, Lal Bahadur Shastri Stadium, Hyderabad	Match drawn.
15 Oct – 17 Oct	North Zone v West Indians, Gandhi Sports Complex Ground, Amritsar	Match drawn.
5 Nov – 7 Nov	Indian Board President's XI v West Indians, Vidarbha Cricket Association Ground, Nagpur	Match drawn.
19 Nov – 21 Nov	West Zone v West Indians, Shri Chhatrapati Shivaji Stadium, Kolhapur	Match drawn.
3 Dec – 5 Dec	East Zone v West Indians, Barabati Stadium, Cuttack	West Indians won by an innings and 124 runs.
