= Pakistani cricket team in India in 1979–80 =

International cricket tour

Pakistan cricket team in India in 1979–80
- Date: 11 November 1979 – 3 February 1980
- Location: India
- Result: India won the 6-Test series 2–0
Teams
- India: Pakistan
Captains
- Sunil Gavaskar Viswanath (6th Test): Asif Iqbal
Most runs
- Sunil Gavaskar (529) Dilip Vengsarkar (316) Yashpal Sharma (314): Wasim Raja (450); Javed Miandad (421); Asif Iqbal (267)
Most wickets
- Kapil Dev (32) Dilip Doshi (18) Karsan Ghavri (15): Sikander Bakht (25); Imran Khan (19); Iqbal Qasim (9)

The Pakistan national cricket team toured India in the 1979–80 season. The two teams played six Tests. India won the test series 2–0 with 4 tests being drawn.

== Test matches ==
=== 1st Test ===
21–26 November 1979
Scorecard

Pakistan	v	India
431/9d (149.3 overs); Mudassar Nazar 126 (337); Dilip Doshi 3/102 (52.3 overs)		416 (164.4 overs); Sunil Gavaskar 88 (219); Imran Khan 4/53 (28.4 overs)
108/2 (42 overs); Zaheer Abbas 31* (98); Shivlal Yadav 1/20 (11 overs)

Match drawn
M Chinnaswamy Stadium, Bangalore
Umpires: Madhav Gothoskar (Ind) and Swaroop Kishen (Ind)

- Pakistan won the toss and decided to bat.
- Ehteshamuddin (Pak) and Roger Binny (Ind) both made their debut in Tests.
- 23 November was a rest day.

=== 2nd Test ===
4–9 December 1979
Scorecard

Pakistan	v	India
273 (91.5 overs); Wasim Raja 97 (174); Kapil Dev 5/58 (23.5 overs)		126 (41.5 overs); Sunil Gavaskar 31 (51); Sikander Bakht 8/69 (21 overs)
242 (80.5 overs); Wasim Raja 61 (121); Kapil Dev 4/63 (22.5 overs)		364/6 (131 overs); Dilip Vengsarkar 146* (370); Sikander Bakht 3/121 (38 overs)

Match drawn
Feroz Shah Kotla, Delhi
Umpires: Mohammad Ghouse (Ind) and Ram Punjabi (Ind)

- Pakistan won the toss and decided to bat.
- 7 December was a rest day.

=== 3rd Test ===
16–20 December 1979
Scorecard

India	v	Pakistan
334 (114.1 overs); Kapil Dev 69 (79); Sikander Bakht 5/55 (22.1 overs)		173 (68.3 overs); Abdul Qadir 29* (104); Shivlal Yadav 3/11 (8 overs)
160 (69.5 overs); Sunil Gavaskar 48 (107); Iqbal Qasim 6/40 (28.5 overs)		190 (51.4 overs); Javed Miandad 64 (126); Karsan Ghavri 4/63 (18 overs)

India won by 131 runs
Wankhede Stadium, Bombay
Umpires: S. N. Hanumantha Rao (Ind) and Kasturi Ramaswami (Ind)

- India won the toss and decided to bat.
- 19 December was a rest day.

=== 4th Test ===
25–30 December 1979
Scorecard

India	v	Pakistan
162 (68.4 overs); Karsan Ghavri 45* (92); Ehteshamuddin 5/47 (26.4 overs)		249 (89.5 overs); Wasim Raja 94* (124); Kapil Dev 6/63 (28 overs)
193/2 (77.2 overs); Sunil Gavaskar 81 (150); Wasim Raja 1/25 (9 overs)

Match drawn
Modi Stadium, Kanpur
Umpires: Mohammad Ghouse (Ind) and Swaroop Kishen (Ind)

- India won the toss and decided to bat.
- Play was not possible on day 5 due to overnight rain.
- 28 December was a rest day.

=== 5th Test ===
15–20 January 1980
Scorecard

Pakistan	v	India
272 (73.4 overs); Majid Khan 56 (90); Kapil Dev 4/90 (19 overs)		430 (134.2 overs); Sunil Gavaskar 166 (373); Imran Khan 5/114 (38.2 overs)
233 (66.4 overs); Wasim Raja 57 (66); Kapil Dev 7/56 (23.4 overs)		78/0 (18 overs); Chetan Chauhan 46* (61); Mudassar Nazar 0/2 (2 overs)

India won by 10 wickets
Madras Cricket Club Ground, Chepauk, Madras
Umpires: Madhav Gothoskar (Ind) and Swaroop Kishen (Ind)

- Pakistan won the toss and decided to bat.
- Sandeep Patil (Ind) made his debut in Tests.
- 18 January was a rest day.

=== 6th Test ===
29 January–3 February 1980
Scorecard

India	v	Pakistan
331 (109 overs); Sandeep Patil 62 (96); Imran Khan 4/67 (33 overs)		272/4d (99.5 overs); Taslim Arif 90 (268); Kapil Dev 2/65 (26 overs)
205 (70.5 overs); Karsan Ghavri 37* (99); Imran Khan 5/63 (23.5 overs)		179/6 (63 overs); Javed Miandad 46 (88); Dilip Doshi 2/46 (20 overs)

Match drawn
Eden Gardens, Calcutta
Umpires: Ram Punjabi (Ind) and Kasturi Ramaswami (Ind)

- India won the toss and decided to bat.
- Taslim Arif (Pak) made his debut in Tests.
- 1 February was a rest day.
