= West Indian cricket team in India and Sri Lanka in 1978–79 =

International cricket tour

The West Indies cricket team, captained by Alvin Kallicharran, toured India and Sri Lanka from November 1978 to February 1979 and played a six-match Test series against the India national cricket team. India won the series 1–0. In Sri Lanka, the West Indians played two internationals against the Sri Lanka national cricket team which had not then achieved Test status; therefore, the internationals played at the Paikiasothy Saravanamuttu Stadium and the Sinhalese Sports Club Ground, both in Colombo, are classified as first-class matches. India were captained by Sunil Gavaskar and Sri Lanka by Anura Tennekoon.It was first test series win for India at home against West Indies

== Test series summary ==
=== First Test ===
1–6 December 1978
(5-day match)
Scorecard

India	v	West Indies
424 (137 overs); SM Gavaskar 205 (342); VA Holder 4/94 (27 overs)		493 (161 overs); AI Kallicharran 187 (315); BS Chandrasekhar 5/116 (43 overs)
224/2 (84.5 overs); CPS Chauhan 84 (188); ST Clarke 1/53 (16 overs)

Match drawn
Wankhede Stadium, Bombay
Umpires: SN Hanumantha Rao and B Satyaji Rao

- West Indies won the toss and elected to field.
- 4 December was taken as a rest day.

=== Second Test ===
15–20 December 1978
(5-day match)
Scorecard

West Indies	v	India
437 (140 overs); SFAF Bacchus 96; BS Bedi 3/98 (29 overs)		371 (116.2 overs); AD Gaekwad 87; ST Clarke 5/126 (34.2 overs)
200/8 (82 overs); HA Gomes 82; KD Ghavri 5/51 (24 overs)

Match drawn
M. Chinnaswamy Stadium, Bangalore
Umpires: MI Ghouse and S Kishen

- West Indies won the toss and elected to bat.
- 18 December was taken as a rest day.
- There was no play on the final day.
- MD Marshall (WIN) made his Test debut.

=== Third Test ===
29 December 1978–3 January 1979
(5-day match)
Scorecard

India	v	West Indies
300 (104.3 overs); SM Gavaskar 107 (249); N Phillip 4/64 (22 overs)		327 (117.4 overs); AB Williams 111; S Venkataraghavan 4/55 (33 overs)
361/1d (93 overs); SM Gavaskar 182* (264); ST Clarke 1/104 (28 overs)		197/9 (105.1 overs); DA Murray 66; KD Ghavri 4/46 (23 overs)

Match drawn
Eden Gardens, Calcutta
Umpires: SN Hanumantha Rao and PR Punjabi

- India won the toss and elected to bat.
- 1 January was taken as a rest day.
- MV Narasimha Rao (IND) made his Test debut.

=== Fourth Test ===
12–16 January 1979
(5-day match)
Scorecard

West Indies	v	India
228 (72.5 overs); AI Kallicharran 98 (155); Kapil Dev 4/38 (14 overs)		255 (83.1 overs); GR Viswanath 124 (237); N Phillip 4/48 (22 overs)
151 (45.5 overs); HA Gomes 91; S Venkataraghavan 4/43 (16.5 overs)		125/7 (46.2 overs); GR Viswanath 31; N Phillip 3/37 (15 overs)

India won by 3 wickets
Madras Cricket Club Ground, Madras
Umpires: JD Ghosh and S Kishen

- West Indies won the toss and elected to bat.
- 15 January was taken as a rest day.
- The match was scheduled for five days but completed in four.
- DD Parsana (IND) and HS Chang (WIN) made their Test debuts.

=== Fifth Test ===
24–29 January 1979
(5-day match)
Scorecard

India	v	West Indies
566/8d (142.2 overs); Kapil Dev 126* (124); ST Clarke 3/139 (36 overs)		172 (56.4 overs); HA Gomes 40; KD Ghavri 3/54 (15 overs)
		179/3 (f/o) (58 overs); SFAF Bacchus 61; BS Chandrasekhar 2/32 (15 overs)

Match drawn
Feroz Shah Kotla Ground, Delhi
Umpires: MI Ghouse and KB Ramaswami

- India won the toss and elected to bat.
- 26 January was taken as a rest day.

=== Sixth Test ===
2–8 February 1979
(6-day match)
Scorecard

India	v	West Indies
644/7d (189.4 overs); GR Viswanath 179; RR Jumadeen 3/137 (45.4 overs)		452/8 (148.1 overs); SFAF Bacchus 250; KD Ghavri 4/118 (31 overs)

Match drawn
Modi Stadium, Kanpur
Umpires: PR Punjabi and B Satyaji Rao

- India won the toss and elected to bat.
- 5 February was taken as a rest day.
- There was no play on the fifth day.
