= 1976–77 Ranji Trophy =

- The Ranji Trophy, which the winners get.
- Administrator: BCCI
- Cricket format: First-class cricket
- Tournament format(s): League and knockout
- Champions: Bombay (27th title)
- Participants: 24
- Most runs: Ashok Mankad (Bombay) (827)
- Most wickets: Karsan Ghavri (Bombay) (40)

The 1976–77 Ranji Trophy was the 43rd season of the Ranji Trophy. Bombay's won their third consecutive title defeating Delhi. This was their 18th win in 19 years.

== Group stage ==
=== North Zone ===
Team	Pld	W	L	D	T	NR	Pts	Q
Delhi	4	3	0	1	0	0	29	4.003
Haryana	4	3	1	0	0	0	24	1.445
Punjab	4	2	1	1	0	0	19	1.071
Services	4	1	3	0	0	0	8	0.531
Jammu and Kashmir	4	0	4	0	0	0	0	0.425

=== South Zone ===
Team	Pld	W	L	D	T	NR	Pts	Q
Tamil Nadu	4	2	0	2	0	0	25	1.635
Karnataka	4	1	0	3	0	0	22	1.463
Hyderabad	4	1	0	3	0	0	21	1.150
Andhra	4	0	1	3	0	0	13	0.886
Kerala	4	0	3	1	0	0	3	0.461

=== West Zone ===
Team	Pld	W	L	D	T	NR	Pts	Q
Bombay	4	1	0	3	0	0	24	1.892
Baroda	4	0	0	4	0	0	16	1.095
Saurashtra	4	1	1	2	0	0	16	0.849
Maharashtra	4	0	0	4	0	0	16	0.848
Gujarat	4	0	1	3	0	0	9	0.713

=== Central Zone ===
Team	Pld	W	L	D	T	NR	Pts	Q
Uttar Pradesh	4	1	0	3	0	0	23	1.715
Railways	4	1	0	3	0	0	18	1.154
Madhya Pradesh	4	2	2	0	0	0	16	1.046
Rajasthan	4	1	1	2	0	0	13	0.808
Vidarbha	4	0	2	2	0	0	6	0.570

=== East Zone ===
Team	Pld	W	L	D	T	NR	Pts	Q
Bihar	3	2	0	1	0	0	22	3.258
Bengal	3	2	0	1	0	0	20	3.248
Assam	3	0	2	1	0	0	2	0.426
Orissa	3	0	2	0	0	0	2	0.198

== Knockout stage ==
Pre-Quarter-finals
25 Feb 1977 — Ghaziabad
Uttar Pradesh	327 & 121/7d
Baroda	212 & 53/3
25 Feb 1977 — Sonipat
Haryana	237 & 139
Bengal	135 & 58

Quarter-finals
11 Mar 1977 — Bangalore
Karnataka	393 & 118/6
Delhi	440 & 284/6d
11 Mar 1977 — Ghaziabad
Uttar Pradesh	389 & 300/5d
Bihar	235 & 126/7
11 Mar 1977 — Bombay
Bombay	513/3d
Haryana	183 & 225
11 Mar 1977 — Delhi
Railways	276 & 114
Tamil Nadu	191 & 248

Semi-finals
26 Mar 1977 — Delhi
Delhi	360 & 25/1
Uttar Pradesh	118 & 396/8d
26 Mar 1977 — Bombay
Bombay	352 & 4/0
Tamil Nadu	197 & 156

Finals
8 Apr 1977 — Delhi
Delhi	291 & 121
Bombay	317 & 224

=== Final ===
8–13 April 1977
Scorecard

Bombay	v	Delhi (H)
317 (123.4 overs); Ashok Mankad 73; Bishan Bedi 4/98		291 (114.1 overs); Surinder Amarnath 81; Karsan Ghavri 6/105
224 (82.3 overs); Karsan Ghavri 70*; Bishan Bedi 5/90		121 (50 overs); Surinder Amarnath 52; Padmakar Shivalkar 6/55

Bombay won by 129 runs
Feroz Shah Kotla Ground, Delhi
Umpires: S. N. Hanumantha Rao and K. B. Ramaswami

- Delhi won the toss and decided to field

== Scorecards and averages ==
- CricketArchive
