= B. Satyaji Rao =

Indian Test cricket umpire (1929–2021)

B. Satyaji Rao (16 October 1929 – 28 September 2021) was an Indian Test cricket umpire.

He was born in Bangalore, British Raj. He was an umpire in first-class cricket from 1956 to 1981. He umpired the final of the Ranji Trophy five times – 1963–64, 1966–67, 1970–71, 1971–72, 1975–76 – and the final of the Duleep Trophy four times – 1964–65, and three years running, 1971–72, 1972–73, and 1973–74.

He stood in 17 Test matches between 1960 and 1979, setting an Indian record subsequently equalled by Swaroop Kishen in 1984 and then surpassed by VK Ramaswamy (26 matches between 1985 and 1999) and Srinivasaraghavan Venkataraghavan (73 matches between 1993 and 2004). All of the Test matches he umpired were played in India.

He first stood as a Test umpire in the 3rd Test between India and Pakistan at Eden Gardens in Calcutta in December 1960, with Santosh Ganguli. His last Test as an umpire was the 6th Test between India and West Indies at Modi Stadium in Kanpur in February 1979, with P. R. Punjabi.

B. Satyaji Rao died in Bengaluru on 28 September 2021 at the age of 92.
