= Gursharan Singh =

Indian cricketer (born 1963)

Personal information
- Born: 8 March 1963 (age 63); Amritsar, Punjab, India
- Batting: Right-handed

International information
- National side: India
- Only Test (cap 191): 22 February 1990 v New Zealand
- Only ODI (cap 77): 8 March 1990 v Australia

Career statistics
Competition	Test	ODI	FC
Matches	1	1	104
Runs scored	18	4	5,719
Batting average	18.00	4.00	43.32
100s/50s	0/0	0/0	14/30
Top score	18	4	298*
Balls bowled	–	–	164
Wickets	–	–	4
Bowling average	–	–	30.00
5 wickets in innings	–	–	0
10 wickets in match	–	–	0
Best bowling	–	–	1/3
Catches/stumpings	2/–	1/–	105/–
- Source: ESPNcricinfo, 5 September 2019

Gursharan Singh (born 8 March 1963) is a former Indian cricketer who played in one Test and one One Day International in 1990.

While appearing as a substitute for Roger Binny in the Third Test against West Indies in 1983 at Ahmedabad, he became the first person to take four substitute catches in a Test. Gursharan later became a senior manager with the Steel Authority of India, Delhi.

In August 2018, he was appointed as the coach for Arunachal Pradesh. In September 2019 he was appointed coach of Uttarakhand.
