= Raju Kulkarni =

Indian cricketer (born 1962)

Personal information
- Full name: Rajiv Ramesh Kulkarni
- Born: 25 September 1962 (age 64); Bombay, India
- Batting: Right-handed
- Bowling: Right-arm fast-medium
- Role: Bowler

International information
- National side: India
- Test debut (cap 175): 15 October 1986 v Australia
- Last Test: 11 February 1987 v Pakistan
- ODI debut (cap 46): 17 December 1983 v West Indies
- Last ODI: 26 March 1987 v Pakistan

Career statistics
Competition	Test	ODI
Matches	3	10
Runs scored	2	33
Batting average	1.00	16.50
100s/50s	0/0	0/0
Top score	2	15
Balls bowled	366	444
Wickets	5	10
Bowling average	45.39	34.50
5 wickets in innings	0	0
10 wickets in match	0	0
Best bowling	3/85	3/42
Catches/stumpings	1/–	2/–
- Source: CricInfo, 6 March 2006

Rajiv Ramesh Kulkarni (born 25 September 1962) is a former Indian cricketer. He played domestic cricket for Bombay as a pace and swing bowler. He took 8 for 111 in the semi-final of the Ranji Trophy in 1982–83, and played in his first One Day International in December 1983 against West Indies.

He was called in shortly before the Test against Australia in his home town of Bombay in October 1986, where he made his Test debut. He played two more Tests against Pakistan in February 1987, but his Test career ended after these 3 matches. He played the last of his 10 ODIs, also against Pakistan, in March 1987. He was selected for the Indian Asia Cup squad in 1990 Asia Cup but did not play a match.

Kulkarni, nicknamed as 'Thommo', is considered to be the fastest Indian bowler of 80's and Sachin Tendulkar had acknowledged the same, in his first interview with Tom Alter. He retired from first-class cricket in 1993, and has a sports equipment business. He stepped down from the Mumbai Cricket Association's (MCA) formed Cricket Improvement Committee (CIC).
