= Roger Binny =

Indian cricketer

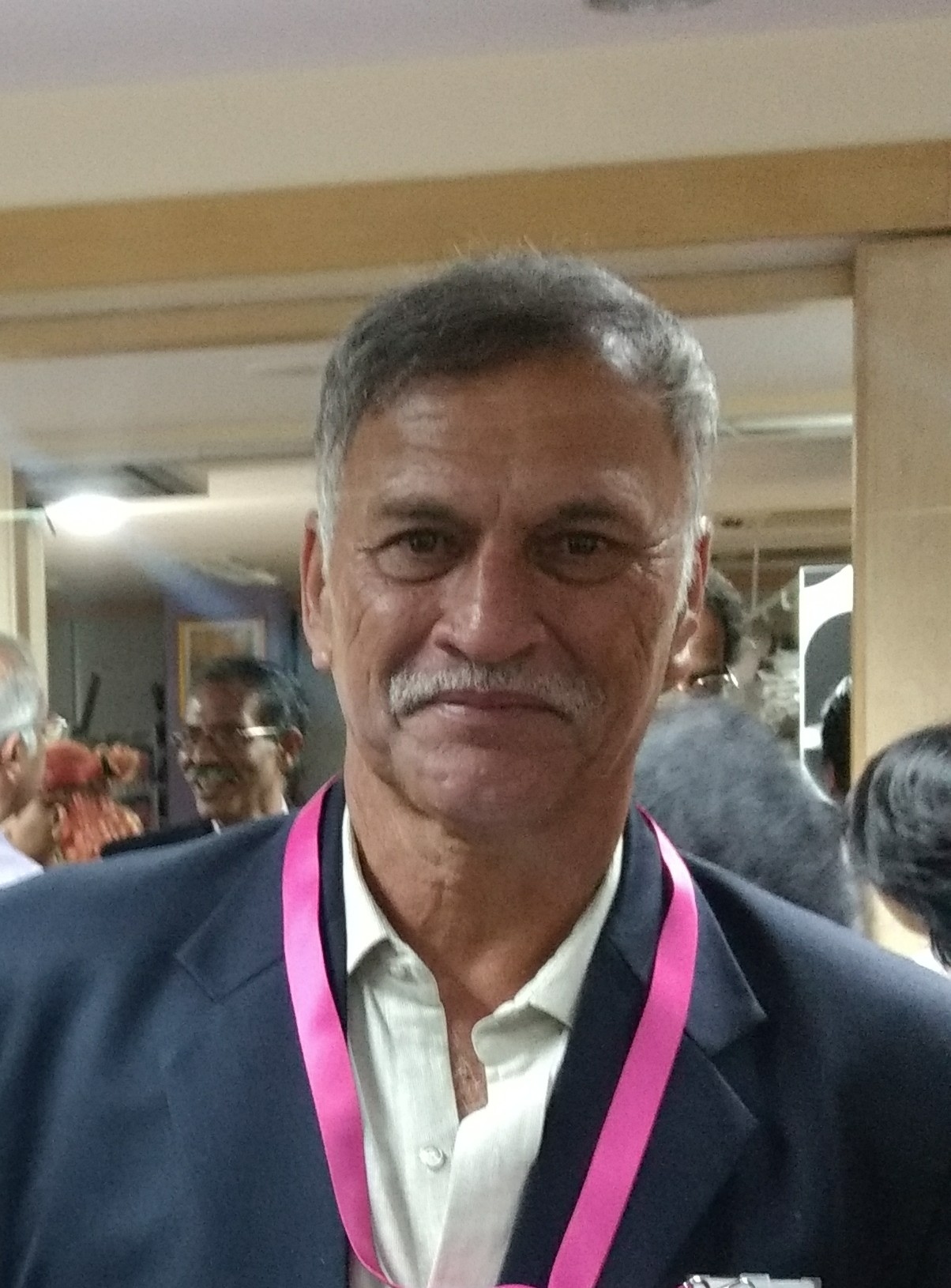
- Binny in 2018

36th President of the Board of Control for Cricket in India
- In office 18 October 2022 – 29th September 2025
- Preceded by: Sourav Ganguly
- Succeeded by: Mithun Manhas

President of the Karnataka State Cricket Association
- In office 3 October 2019 – 18 October 2022

Personal details
- Born: Roger Michael Humphrey Binny; 19 July 1955 (age 71) Bangalore, Mysore State, India
- Relations: Stuart Binny (son); Mayanti Langer (daughter-in-law)
- Occupation: Cricketer; cricket administrator
- Cricket career

Cricket information
- Batting: Right-handed
- Bowling: Right-arm fast-medium
- Role: All-rounder

International information
- National side: India (1979-1987)
- Test debut (cap 148): 21 November 1979 v Pakistan
- Last Test: 13 March 1987 v Pakistan
- ODI debut (cap 30): 6 December 1980 v Australia
- Last ODI: 9 October 1987 v Australia

Head coaching information
- Years: Team
- 2000: India U-19

Career statistics
Competition	Test	ODI
Matches	27	72
Runs scored	830	629
Batting average	23.06	16.13
100s/50s	0/5	0/1
Top score	83	57
Balls bowled	2,870	2,957
Wickets	47	77
Bowling average	32.64	29.35
5 wickets in innings	2	0
10 wickets in match	0	0
Best bowling	8/101	4/29
Catches/stumpings	11/–	12
Medal record
Men's Cricket
Representing India
ICC Cricket World Cup
Winner	1983 England and Wales
ACC Asia Cup
Winner	1984 United Arab Emirates
Representing India as Coach
ICC Under-19 Cricket World Cup
Winner	2000 Sri Lanka
- Source: ESPNcricinfo, 13 April 2023

Roger Michael Humphrey Binny (born 19 July 1955) is a former Indian cricketer who was the 36th president of the Board of Control for Cricket in India (BCCI). He was the president of Karnataka State Cricket Association from 2019 to 2022. Binny was part of the India Team that won the 1983 Cricket World Cup and the 1985 World Championship of Cricket, being India's highest wicket-taker in both tournaments. He was also the head coach of the Indian U-19 team that won the 2000 Under-19 Cricket World Cup and has served as a national selector. He has also worked as a developmental officer in the Asian Cricket Council (ACC). The Indian team won the T20 World Cup 2024 and Champions Trophy 2025 when Binny was the president of BCCI.

== Family and background ==
Roger Binny was born in Bengaluru (Karnataka formerly the Mysuru State). Binny is the first Anglo-Indian of Scottish origin who played cricket for India. His son, Stuart Binny, followed his footsteps, having played state cricket for the Karnataka cricket team and international cricket for the India national cricket team. He also represented Karnataka in the Irani Trophy, a tournament between the champions of the Ranji Trophy and a team comprising the best players from other Indian states. He was on the verge of playing for the Indian national team during his college years.

== Playing career ==
Roger Binny is best known for his impressive bowling performance in the 1983 Cricket World Cup, in which he was the highest wicket-taker (18 wickets), and in the 1985 World Series Cricket Championship in Australia where he repeated this feat (9 wickets.

Binny made his test cricket debut at the M. Chinnaswamy Stadium in Bengaluru against Pakistan, in the first test of the 1979 series. He had an unusual bowling style as a result of being a former javelin thrower, where his striking foot on the crease before the ball was released was orthogonal as opposed to straight like other bowlers. Against the bowling line-up of Imran Khan and Sarfraz Nawaz, Binny proved to be a versatile allrounder, scoring 46 runs in a drawn match. Binny would turn into a useful test match bowler, taking India to victory with his seven wickets in a match against England at Headingley in 1986, and with a spell of 4 for 9 in 30 balls, as a part of his best Test figures of 6 for 56, against Pakistan in Calcutta in 1987. His Test career was not stellar, but he and fellow pace bowler Karsan Ghavri helped get the shine off the new ball before India's spinner could take over.

Binny, Ghavri (along with wicket-keeper Syed Kirmani), and Madan Lal were also credited with saving many test matches with his aggressive rear-guard actions, helping avert innings defeats. Binny would rescue India with an unbeaten 83 in a record seventh-wicket partnership of 155 with Madan Lal against Pakistan in Bengaluru in 1983. Tall and athletically built, Binny was also an excellent fielder.

Binny was generally in and out of the Indian team but proved his value in the English conditions of the 1983 Cricket World Cup, where along with Madan Lal, and under the leadership of Kapil Dev, he helped India win its first World Cup title with a record 18 wickets.

== Coaching career and media ==
Binny coached the India national under-19 cricket team to victory at the 2000 Under-19 Cricket World Cup held in Sri Lanka in January 2000. Mohammed Kaif and Yuvraj Singh from this team would go on to have distinguished careers with the senior cricket team. Two years later, he went into the grassroots to coach the Under-16s and played a key role in the emergence of young players such as Ambati Rayudu, Robin Uthappa, and Irfan Pathan.

== Administration ==
Binny served in the Karnataka State Cricket Association management until he was appointed national selector in September 2012. Binny would recuse himself from selection matters involving his son Stuart Binny but resigned from his position in 2015 during the Lodha Committee inquiry because of "perception than propriety" according to Sunil Gavaskar.

He was elected unopposed as the president of BCCI on 18 October 2022, succeeding Saurav Ganguly.

In December 2023, BCCI President Roger Binny was appointed chairperson of an eight-member committee specifically designed to bolster and guide the development of the Women's Premier League (WPL).

== In popular culture ==
Bollywood Director Kabir Khan has made a sports drama film named 83 about India's first World Cup win in 1983 at Lord's, in which Nishant Dahiya plays the role of Roger Binny.

== See also ==
- Sport in India - Sporting culture overview of India
- 1983 Cricket World Cup Final

== Bibliography ==
- Sundaresan, P.N. "India's Internationals Keen to be Tested", ABC Cricket Book: New Zealand, India in Australia 1980-81, ed. McGilvray, A., Australian Broadcasting Commission: Sydney. ISBN 0 642 97549 3.
