= Ashok Malhotra =

Indian cricketer (born 1957)

Personal information
- Full name: Ashok Omprakash Malhotra
- Born: 26 January 1957 (age 69); Amritsar, Punjab, India
- Batting: Right-handed
- Bowling: Right-arm medium

International information
- National side: India
- Test debut (cap 155): 13 January 1982 v England
- Last Test: 31 January 1985 v England
- ODI debut (cap 40): 27 January 1982 v England
- Last ODI: 5 February 1986 v Australia

Career statistics
Competition	Test	ODI
Matches	7	20
Runs scored	226	457
Batting average	25.11	30.46
100s/50s	0/1	0/1
Top score	72*	65
Catches/stumpings	2/–	4/–
- Source: ESPNcricinfo, 4 February 2006

Ashok Omprakash Malhotra (born 26 January 1957) is a former Indian cricketer who played in seven Test matches and 20 One Day Internationals from 1982 to 1986. He used to be the highest scorer in Ranji Trophy at one time. He was also said to be the next Viswanath in Indian cricket. In the early 1990s, he was an overseas professional at Dunfermline Cricket Club in Fife, Scotland. During his time in Fife he became a big fan of Dunfermline Athletic FC. He has opened a cricket coaching centre namely Ashok Malhotra Cricket Academy which has around 300 students. He is one of the very few level 3 coaches in India. He was also a part of the Indian squad which won the 1985 World Championship of Cricket.

A Level III coach, Malhotra briefly coached Team India in an acting capacity after John Wright had had to return to New Zealand.

On 22 July 2013, Malhotra was named coach of the Bengal senior cricket team.
