= Shivlal Yadav =

Indian cricketer (born 1957)

Personal information
- Full name: Nandlal Shivlal Yadav
- Born: 26 January 1957 (age 69); Hyderabad, Telangana, India
- Batting: Right-handed
- Bowling: Right-Arm Off-Break

International information
- National side: India
- Test debut (cap 147): 19 September 1979 v Australia
- Last Test: 13 March 1987 v Pakistan
- ODI debut (cap 56): 11 January 1986 v New Zealand
- Last ODI: 11 January 1987 v Sri Lanka

Career statistics
Competition	Test	ODI
Matches	35	7
Runs scored	403	1
Batting average	14.39	–
100s/50s	0/0	0/0
Top score	43	1*
Balls bowled	8,360	330
Wickets	102	8
Bowling average	35.09	28.50
5 wickets in innings	3	0
10 wickets in match	0	0
Best bowling	5/76	2/18
Catches/stumpings	10/–	1/–
- Source: CricInfo, 4 February 2006

Shivlal Yadav (born 26 January 1957) is a former Indian cricketer who played in 35 Test matches and seven One Day Internationals from 1979 to 1987.

A right arm offbreak bowler, he made his Test debut in 1979 during a rebuilding stage in Indian cricket with their spin quartet breaking up. His debut series, against Australia, was a success with 24 wickets in the five Tests and he did enough to force Srinivasaraghavan Venkataraghavan out of the side. He played regularly for India until 1987, forming a new spin trio with Shastri and Doshi.

He made an impressive start by taking 7 wickets on his debut Test against Australia at Bangalore in 1979. He played a key role in India's win against Australia in the very next Test match he played. He got rid of three batsmen – Allan Border, Dav Whatmore and Kevin Wright in quick succession in the fourth innings ensuring a comfortable win for India. Australia required 279 runs to win but ended up being all out for just 125. He ended up with 4 wickets in that innings and 6 wickets in that Test.

He lost his place in the side briefly in a period in the early 1980s but returned successfully against the touring West Indian side in 1983–84 where he took 5 wickets for 131 runs in the first innings of the 4th Test at Bombay.

Against Australia in 1985–86 he picked up 15 wickets in the 3 Test series. This haul included career best match figures of 8/118 in the Test at Sydney. His best innings figures came against Sri Lanka at Nagpur with 5/76. He brought up his 100th Test wicket in his penultimate Test, against Pakistan.

In 2014, the Supreme Court of India has named Shivlal Yadav as a national manager, which will look on the work of BCCI other than IPL-7. This is on temporary basis.
