= Bhairab Ganguli =

Indian cricket umpire (1931–2014)

Personal information
- Born: 1 August 1931; Dacca, Bengal Presidency, British India
- Died: 30 July 2014 (aged 82); Kolkata, India

Umpiring information
- Tests umpired: 5 (1982–1985)
- ODIs umpired: 2 (1982–1984)
- FC umpired: 29 (1971–1986)
- Source: CricketArchive, 26 August 2016

Bhairab Ganguli (1 August 1931 – 30 July 2014) was an Indian cricket umpire. He stood in seven international fixtures, including five Test matches between 1982 and 1985 and two One Day Internationals between 1982 and 1984. He also officiated in 29 first-class matches between 1971 and 1986.

== See also ==
- List of Test cricket umpires
- List of One Day International cricket umpires
