= Syed Kirmani =

Indian cricketer (born 1944)

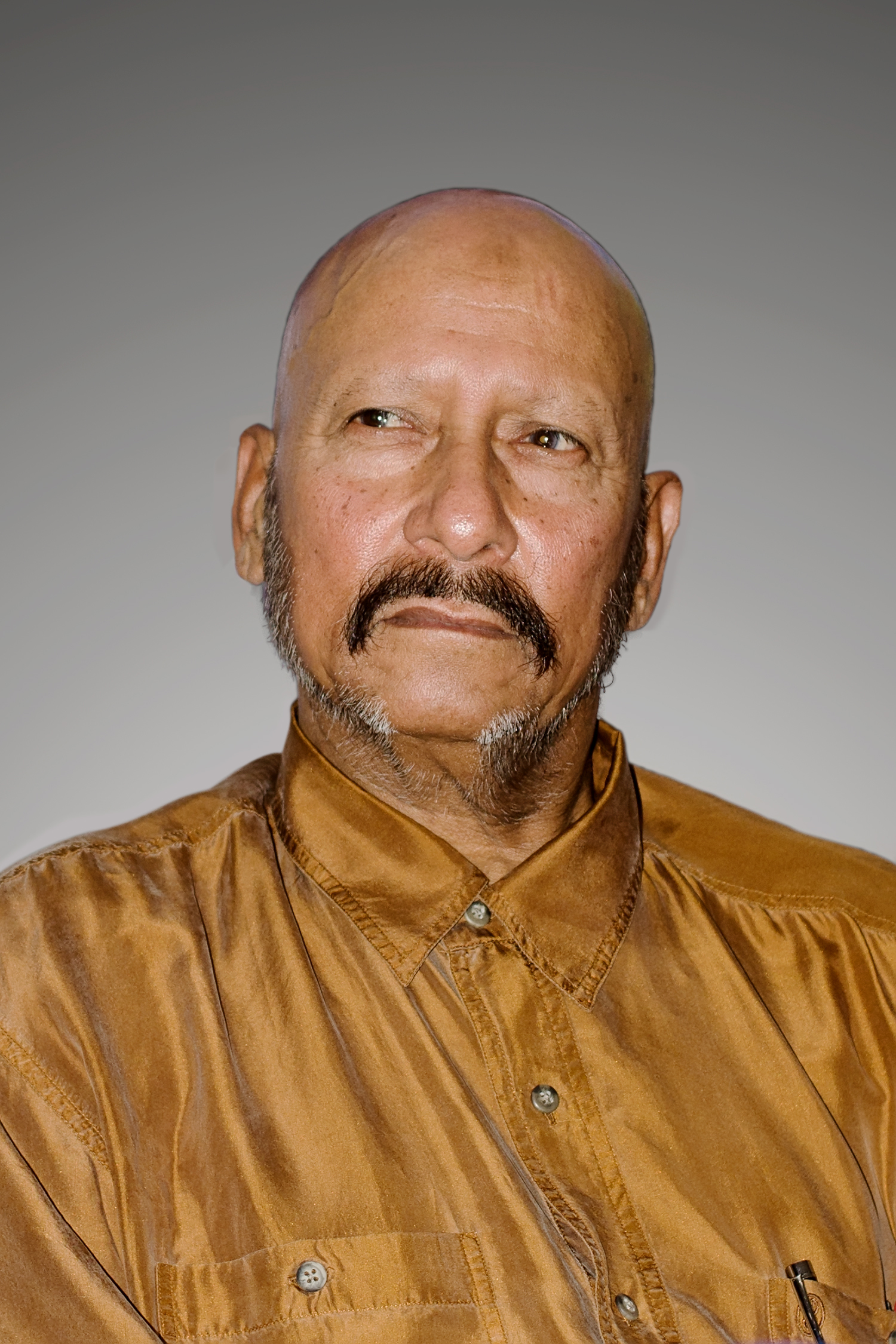

Personal information
- Full name: Syed Mujtaba Hussain Kirmani
- Born: 29 December 1949 (age 76); Madras, (Now Chennai), India
- Batting: Right-handed
- Role: Batsman, Wicket-keeper
- Relatives: Sadiq Kirmani (son)

International information
- National side: India (1976–1986)
- Test debut (cap 138): 24 January 1976 v New Zealand
- Last Test: 2 January 1986 v Australia
- ODI debut (cap 17): 21 February 1976 v New Zealand
- Last ODI: 12 January 1986 v Australia

Career statistics
| Competition | Tests | ODI | FC | LA |
|---|---|---|---|---|
| Matches | 88 | 49 | 275 | 84 |
| Runs scored | 2,759 | 373 | 9,620 | 881 |
| Batting average | 27.04 | 20.72 | 30.15 | 25.17 |
| 100s/50s | 2/12 | 0/0 | 13/38 | 0/3 |
| Top score | 102 | 48* | 161 | 64 |
| Balls bowled | 19 | – | 175 | – |
| Wickets | 1 | – | 1 | – |
| Bowling average | 13.00 | – | 126.00 | – |
| 5 wickets in innings | 0 | – | 0 | – |
| 10 wickets in match | 0 | – | 0 | – |
| Best bowling | 1/9 | – | 1/9 | – |
| Catches/stumpings | 160/38 | 27/9 | 367/112 | 59/15 |
Medal record
Men's Cricket
Representing India
ICC Cricket World Cup
| Winner | 1983 England and Wales |
- Source: ESPNCricinfo, 20 August 2020

Syed Mujtaba Hussain Kirmani (born 29 December 1949) is an Indian cricketer who played cricket for India and Karnataka as a wicket-keeper. In 2016, he was awarded the Col CK Nayudu Lifetime Achievement Award, the highest honour bestowed by BCCI on a former player. Kirmani was a member of the Indian team that won the 1983 Cricket World Cup.

== International career ==
=== 1971–1982 ===
He started off as an understudy to Farokh Engineer in the tours of England in 1971 and 1974 and to the 1975 World Cup. Kirmani made his debut against New Zealand and in his second Test, equalled the world record of six victims in an innings.

When New Zealand toured India the next year, he topped the batting averages with 65.33, and scored 305 runs in the tour of Australia. He did not have a very good time behind the stumps against Pakistan and West Indies in 1978–79.

He was dropped in favour of Bharath Reddy for the 1979 Cricket World Cup and the subsequent series against England. Sunil Gavaskar was also sacked as the captain. Though Kirmani was dropped ostensibly for performance, there was a rumour that the real reason was that both he and Gavaskar had been approached by the organisers of the Kerry Packer's World Series Cricket.

Back in the team for the series against Australia in 1979–80, he scored a hundred as a nightwatchman in Bombay. His innings of 101* in five hours nearly lasted out the day. He had 17 catches and two stumpings against Pakistan in the same season and it equalled Naren Tamhane's Indian record for a single series. Against England in 1981–82, he did not concede a single bye in three consecutive Tests while 1964 runs were scored.

=== 1983 World Cup ===
Kirmani won the award for the best wicket keeper in the 1983 Cricket World Cup, his highlight of which was the catch of Faoud Bacchus that he took in the final against the West Indies. In the first round match against Zimbabwe, he equalled the then record by effecting three catches and two stumpings. Kirmani was a lower order reliable batsman and another example is the unbroken 126 for ninth wicket with Kapil Dev against Zimbabwe in the 1983 World Cup with Kirmani contributing 24 runs and that partnership proved critical in India being able to continue their run in the tournament.

=== 1984–1986 ===
At Bombay the next year, he scored his second hundred in Tests making 102 and adding 235 with Ravi Shastri, still an Indian record for the seventh wicket. In the Madras Test in the same series, he missed some crucial catches which contributed to an Indian defeat. He was dropped at the end of that series in favour of Sadanand Viswanath.

Kirmani made a comeback in the Australian tour of 1985–86, where he fared reasonably well. He had just taken an outstanding catch to dismiss Allan Border in a World Series Cup match, when he hurt his leg badly. He was forced to sit out of the remaining matches of the tournament and that effectively ended his international career. India went for younger keepers like Kiran More and Chandrakant Pandit and despite trying hard, Kirmani was never able to regain his place.

During his international career, his record included 160 catches and 38 stumpings during test matches, and 27 catches and 9 stumpings during one-day internationals. Always a central figure on the field, he could dive and somersault to catch the ball, and was responsible for many run-outs.

== Domestic career ==
Later in his career he played for Railways in domestic cricket for a season, after which he returned to his former team, Karnataka.

== Family ==
His son, Sadiq Kirmani (born 21 May 1989), is also an Indian cricketer who plays for Karnataka in domestic cricket. He is a right-handed batsman and wicket-keeper. Sadiq did his schooling in The Frank Anthony Public School, Bangalore. Sadiq has two elder sisters. The oldest, Nishat Fatima, is married to the son of former India cricketer Syed Abid Ali.

== Awards ==
- He was awarded the Padma Shri in 1982.
- In 2016 he became the recipient of the 2015 Col CK Nayudu Lifetime Achievement Award.

== Filmography ==
| Year | Title | Role | Language | Notes | Ref. |
|---|---|---|---|---|---|
| 1985 | Kabhie Ajnabi The | Himself | Hindi | | |
| 2007 | Sixer | Himself | Kannada | | |
| 2010 | Deadly-2 | Himself | Kannada | | |
| 2012 | Mazhavillinattam Vare | Himself | Malayalam | Cameo | |

== In popular culture ==
A Bollywood film titled 83 released in December 2021 about the event of India's first world cup win at Lords. The film features Sahil Khattar as Kirmani and is produced by Anurag Kashyap.

== Notes ==
- Christopher Martin-Jenkins, The Complete Who's Who of Test Cricketers

| Preceded by Brijesh Patel | Chairman, Selection Committee; October 2003 – September 2004 | Succeeded by Kiran More |
