= Swaroop Kishen =

Indian cricket umpire

Personal information
- Full name: Swaroop Kishen Reu
- Born: 13 July 1930; Srinagar, Jammu and Kashmir, India
- Died: 21 November 1992 (aged 62); Delhi
- Role: Umpire

Umpiring information
- Tests umpired: 17 (1978–1984)
- ODIs umpired: 6 (1981–1985)
- WTests umpired: 1 (1984)
- Source: Cricinfo profile, 30 May 2025

Swaroop Kishen Reu (13 July 1930 – 21 November 1992) was an Indian Test cricket umpire. His name is sometimes spelled "Swarup Kishan".

He was born in Srinagar, Jammu and Kashmir. He played cricket as a wicketkeeper batsman at Delhi University. He became a lawyer, working in the Auditor-General's Office.

He umpired in first-class cricket from 1969 to 1984, including officiating in the final of the Duleep Trophy in 1981/2 and of the Ranji Trophy in 1982/3. He also umpired in List A cricket, including the final of the Deodhar Trophy in 1980/1.

At the international level, he stood in 17 Test matches between 1978 and 1984, equalling the Indian record of B. Satyaji Rao in 1979, but subsequently surpassed by VK Ramaswamy (26 matches between 1985 and 1999) and Srinivasaraghavan Venkataraghavan (73 matches between 1993 and 2004). All of the Test matches he umpired in were played in India. His bulky white-coated body and habit of chewing tobacco made him instantly recognisable.

He first stood as a Test umpire in the 2nd Test between India and West Indies in Bangalore in December 1978, with Mohammad Ghouse as the other on-field umpire. He also stood in the 4th Test, at MA Chidambaram Stadium in Chepauk, Madras, in January 1979, with Jiban Ghosh. He also stood in the 1st and 5th Tests against Australia later in 1979, and the 1st, 4th and 5th Tests against Pakistan in 1979/80. The first day of the first India-Pakistan Test, also in Bangalore, was interrupted when a swarms of bees flew over the field, and the players and umpires threw themselves to the ground to escape.

Controversy attended the final day of the rain-affected 1st Test against Pakistan in Bangalore in September 1983. A minimum of 77 overs were due to be bowled, but Kishen and Madhav Gothoskar informed Pakistan captain Zaheer Abbas that all 20 of the overs due when the final hour of play started had to be completed. However, Zaheer Abbas led his team off the field after the 14th over (the 77th over of the day) but was persuaded to return to allow Indian captain Sunil Gavaskar to reach his 28th Test century.

India only lost two of the Tests he umpired, both against West India in 1983. He was standing at the other end at Bombay in November 1983 when Desmond Haynes was give out "handled the ball" – the fourth in Test history.

His last Test, and also his last first-class match, as an umpire was played between India and England at Wankhede Stadium in Bombay in November 1984.

He also stood in 6 One-day Internationals between 1981 and 1985, including 3 in Sharjah, and umpired one Women's Test, played between Australia and India at Feroz Shah Kotla in Delhi in January 1984.

He was awarded the Padma Shri for his services to cricket. He died in Delhi from cancer.

== See also ==
- List of Test cricket umpires
- List of One Day International cricket umpires
