= Karsan Ghavri =

Indian cricketer (born 1951)

Personal information
- Full name: Karshan Devjibhai Ghavri
- Born: 28 February 1951 (age 75); Rajkot, Saurashtra, India
- Batting: Left-handed
- Bowling: Left-arm medium; Slow left arm orthodox

International information
- National side: India
- Test debut (cap 136): 27 December 1974 v West Indies
- Last Test: 6 March 1981 v New Zealand
- ODI debut (cap 16): 7 June 1975 v England
- Last ODI: 15 February 1981 v New Zealand

Career statistics
Competition	Test	ODI
Matches	39	19
Runs scored	913	114
Batting average	21.23	11.40
100s/50s	0/2	0/0
Top score	86	20
Balls bowled	7,036	1,033
Wickets	109	15
Bowling average	33.54	47.20
5 wickets in innings	4	0
10 wickets in match	0	0
Best bowling	5/33	3/40
Catches/stumpings	16/–	2/–
- Source: ESPNcricinfo, 4 February 2006

Karsan Devjibhai Ghavri (born 28 February 1951) is an Indian former cricketer who played in 39 Test matches and 19 One Day Internationals from 1974 to 1981. He played in the 1975 and 1979 World Cups. He is one of very few Dalits to represent India in international cricket.

Ghavri started his career playing Ranji Trophy for Saurashtra, but later he played for Mumbai. In December 2019, Saurashtra Cricket Association appointed him Head Coach of their Ranji Team. In 2006 he was head coach of Tripura.

Ghavri was a left-arm fast-medium pace bowler, with a long run-up and a high leaping action. He could also produce quickish but accurate left-arm finger spin. Altogether he took 109 Test wickets, including four five-wicket hauls. With the bat he was usually found in the lower order but managed a couple of Test half centuries including a career best 86 against Australia in Bombay. By the time he was dismissed he had made a record eighth-wicket partnership of 127 with Syed Kirmani. His 86 came off just 99 balls which contained 12 fours and 3 huge sixes. Syed Kirmani who was sent as a night watchman remained unbeaten with 101. India went on to win that Test match and also the series against Kim Hughes' Australian team.

Despite making his debut in 1975, it was not until the season of 1976–77 that he cemented his spot in the side after series against New Zealand and England. He remained a regular member of the side until 1981. His most successful series came against the West Indies in 1978–79 with 27 wickets. One of his memorable spells came during India's tour of Australia in 1981 during second innings of the 3rd Test match of the series. On the 4th day of that match he got rid of Australia's opening batsman John Dyson and captain Greg Chappell in 2 successive deliveries which set up the stage for India's victory on the final day. India won that match by 59 runs with Kapil Dev doing rest of the damage on the final day of the match.

He was Kapil Dev's bowling partner when the future Indian great made his debut in 1978 against Pakistan at Faisalabad.

Ghavri was eventually replaced by Madan Lal during the 1982 tour of England to India.
