= Dilip Doshi =

Indian cricketer (1947–2025)

Personal information
- Full name: Dilip Rasiklal Doshi
- Born: 22 December 1947; Rajkot, Rajkot State, India
- Died: 23 June 2025 (aged 77); London, England
- Batting: Left-handed
- Bowling: Slow left-arm orthodox
- Role: Bowler

International information
- National side: India
- Test debut (cap 146): 11 September 1979 v Australia
- Last Test: 14 September 1983 v Pakistan
- ODI debut (cap 31): 6 December 1980 v Australia
- Last ODI: 17 December 1982 v Pakistan

Domestic team information
- Years: Team
- 1968/69–1984/85: Bengal
- 1968/69–1984/85: East Zone
- 1973–1978: Nottinghamshire
- 1980–1981: Warwickshire

Career statistics
| Competition | Test | ODI | FC | LA |
|---|---|---|---|---|
| Matches | 33 | 15 | 238 | 59 |
| Runs scored | 129 | 9 | 1,442 | 95 |
| Batting average | 4.60 | 3.00 | 7.87 | 7.30 |
| 100s/50s | 0/0 | 0/0 | 0/0 | 0/0 |
| Top score | 20 | 5* | 44 | 19* |
| Balls bowled | 9,322 | 792 | 58,712 | 3,084 |
| Wickets | 114 | 22 | 898 | 75 |
| Bowling average | 30.71 | 23.81 | 26.58 | 25.80 |
| 5 wickets in innings | 6 | 0 | 43 | 1 |
| 10 wickets in match | 0 | 0 | 6 | 0 |
| Best bowling | 6/102 | 4/30 | 7/29 | 5/24 |
| Catches/stumpings | 10/– | 3/– | 62/– | 7/– |
- Source: ESPNcricinfo, 5 October 2016

Dilip Rasiklal Doshi (22 December 1947 – 23 June 2025) was an Indian cricketer from Bengal though his origin goes back to Gujarat. He played in 33 Test matches and 15 One Day Internationals from 1979 to 1983.

Doshi was one of only four Test bowlers who played their first Test after the age of thirty, yet went on to take more than 100 wickets, the other three being Clarrie Grimmett, Saeed Ajmal and Ryan Harris.

== In Test Cricket ==
Doshi was already in his 30s when he made his Test debut at Chennai, against Australia in September 1979. He made his Test debut at Chennai against Australia in September 1979 and took 6/103 and 2/64 in the match. He continued to perform well in the series and in the final test match at Bombay, he was one of the heroes of an India victory with figures of 5/43 and 3/60. He took 4/92 at Eden Gardens, Calcutta, in front of a crowd of approximately 70,000.

After this series, Doshi's place in the Indian Test team became permanent. In the following years, while maintaining consistency and accuracy, he did not frequently deliver match-winning performances at the international level. He was known for his accuracy and consistency, though he did not often produce decisive bowling performances. His only match winning effort after the Australian series came at Bombay, against England, in 1981–82. His 5/39, helped India gain a vital first innings lead in a low scoring match. The emergence of Maninder Singh during the 1982–83 season hastened the end of Doshi's test career.

Doshi had a low batting average of 4.60 and batted exclusively at number 11 in all 38 of his Test innings, a record. Doshi holds the record for the most Test Match innings in a career without ever batting above someone else in the order, with 38 innings batting at number 11 in the order.

== In ODIs ==
Doshi made his ODI debut during the 1980–81 tour of Australia. At Gabba, against New Zealand, he produced his best figures of 4/30. Both his average (23.81) and economy rate (3.96) in ODIs are impressive. Due to limitations in batting and fielding, he played only 15 ODIs for India. All-rounder Ravi Shastri was preferred to him for the 1983 World Cup.

== In first-class cricket ==
Though Doshi made his first-class debut with Saurashtra, he played most of his Ranji Trophy cricket with Bengal. It was for Bengal that he achieved the remarkable figures of 6 wickets for 6 runs against Assam in 1974. Overall, his long Ranji Trophy career shows 318 wickets at an impressive average of 18.33.

He also played first class cricket for Nottinghamshire and Warwickshire in the English midlands. Overall, his first class career shows 898 wickets at 26.58 a piece.

In March 1983, he took 7/39 and 5/74 in a three-day match during a tour of Dhaka, contributing significantly to his team's win. He took 3/27 from nine overs in the 45-over match.

== The unfortunate trio ==
Throughout the late 1960s and 1970s, three left arm spinners dominated the Indian domestic cricket scene. Along with Doshi there were, Padmakar Shivalkar from Bombay, & Rajinder Goel of Haryana & Delhi. Goel still holds the record for the highest number of wickets in the Ranji Trophy (640 at 17.14). Shivlakar holds the record for his team Mumbai. Years after years, they destroyed strong batting line ups in Indian cricket with the guile of their spin, only to be overlooked by the national selectors. The only reason was the presence of B.S. Bedi. With a world class left arm spinner readily available, the selectors were reluctant to give the others much chance. Thus, Shivalker and Goel had to content themselves with a few unofficial test matches against Sri Lanka. While Shivalkar and Goel had limited opportunities at the international level due to B.S. Bedi’s dominance, Doshi debuted in Tests in 1979. Due to his late debut, Doshi’s international career began after he had spent many years in domestic cricket.

== Death ==
Dilip died from a cardiac arrest in London, on 23 June 2025, at the age of 77.

== Career Test Bowling performances against other countries ==
| Opposition | Matches | Wickets | Average | Best | Five-wicket hauls |
|---|---|---|---|---|---|
| Australia | 9 | 38 | 28.15 | 6/103 | 2 |
| England | 10 | 36 | 27.55 | 6/102 | 2 |
| New Zealand | 2 | 5 | 32.80 | 2/18 | 0 |
| Pakistan | 11 | 27 | 38.66 | 5/90 | 1 |
| Sri Lanka | 1 | 8 | 29.00 | 5/85 | 1 |
| Overall | 33 | 114 | 30.71 | 6/102 | 6 |

- Source: CricInfo

== See also ==
- List of India cricketers who have taken five-wicket hauls on Test debut
