= Mohammad Ghouse =

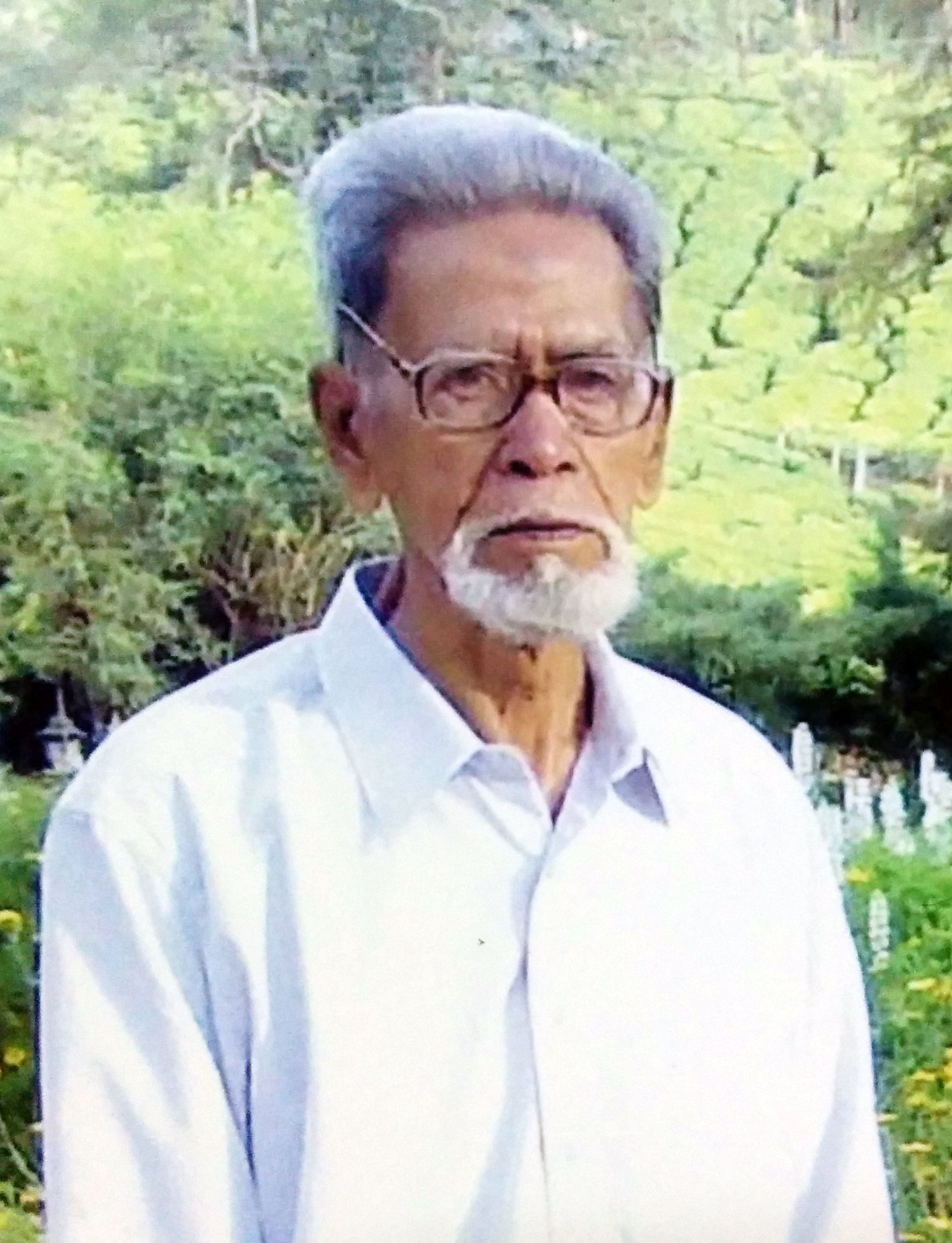

Personal information
- Born: 15 March 1931; Chennai, India
- Died: 29 September 2014 (aged 83); Chennai, India

Umpiring information
- Tests umpired: 8 (1976–1979)
- ODIs umpired: 2 (1983–1984)
- Source: CricketArchive

Mohammad Ghouse (15 March 1931 – 29 September 2014) was an international cricket umpire from India. He was the former chairman of Tamil Nadu Cricket Association and the ex-President of Tamil Nadu Umpires Guild. He also served as a Match Referee.

== Early life ==
Ghouse was born in Chennai, India, formerly Madras. His Father's name was Mohammed Ibrahim. He studied in the prestigious Loyola College, Chennai and worked in the Postal Department of India. His profound interest in the game of cricket prompted him to become a test umpire and later on, a match referee.

== Career ==
Ghouse umpired in two One Day International matches which included India v West Indies at Srinagar on 13 October 1983 and India v England at Pune on 5 December 1984. Of the 8 Test matches he umpired, India won 4, lost 0, and 4 matches resulted in a draw. He also umpired many interstate tournaments. Ghouse made his first-class debut as an umpire in a Ranji Trophy match in 1968-69 and went on to officiate more than 18 seasons. His first Test as an official was in his hometown, between India and New Zealand in 1975–76.

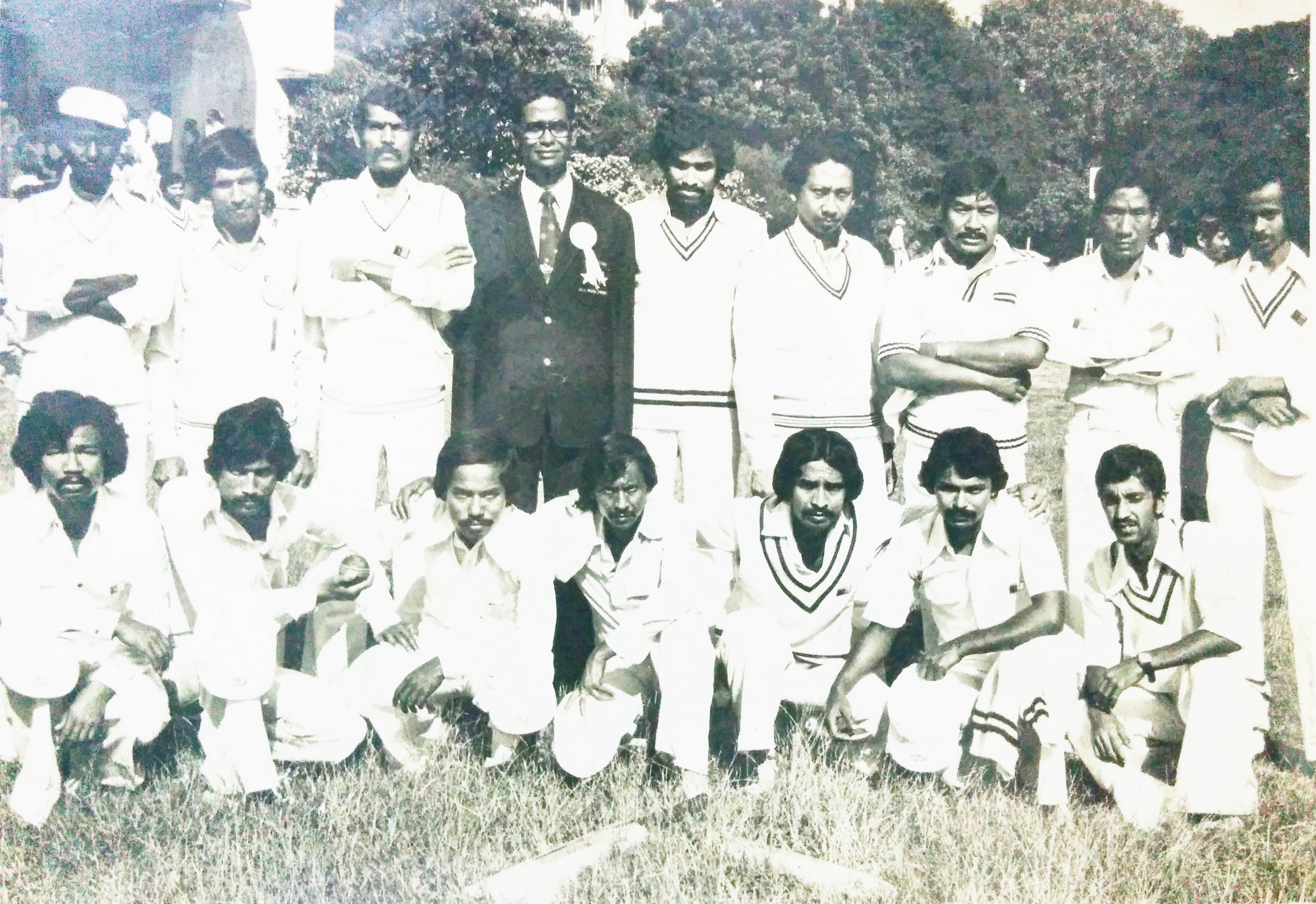
Mohammad Ghouse with the Indian Cricket Team.

After his umpiring career ended in 1985–86, he became a match referee and was active till 2001–02. Ghouse also served as the chairman of the umpire's subcommittee of the Tamil Nadu Cricket Association.

== List of Test matches umpired by Mohammed Ghouse ==
Date	Match Between	Place	Match id
26 November 1976	India v New Zealand	MA Chidambaram Stadium, Chepauk, Madras	t787
28 January 1977	India v England	M.Chinnaswamy Stadium, Bangalore	t794
15 December 1978	India v West Indies	M Chinnaswamy Stadium, Bangalore	t837
24 January 1979	India v West Indies	Feroz Shah Kotla Ground, Delhi	t842
2 October 1979	India v Australia	Modi Stadium, Kanpur	t857
3 November 1979	India v Australia	Wankhede Stadium, Bombay	t860
4 December 1979	India v Pakistan	Feroz Shah Kotla Ground, Delhi	t863
25 December 1979	India v Pakistan	Modi Stadium, Kanpur	t866

== Death ==
Ghouse died on the morning of 29 September 2014 following a brief illness. He was 83. He is survived by his wife, son and three daughters. On behalf of Tamil Nadu Cricket Association members, president N. Srinivasan expressed "profound sorrow and grief" at his demise.

== See also ==
- List of Test cricket umpires
- List of One Day International cricket umpires
