= Gundappa Viswanath =

Indian cricketer (born 1949)

Personal information
- Full name: Gundappa Ranganath Viswanath
- Born: 12 February 1949 (age 77); Bhadravathi, Mysore State, India
- Height: 5 ft 3 in (160 cm)
- Batting: Right-handed
- Bowling: Legbreak
- Relatives: Sunil Gavaskar (brother-in-law); Rohan Gavaskar (nephew)

International information
- National side: India (1969–1983)
- Test debut (cap 124): 15 November 1969 v Australia
- Last Test: 30 January 1983 v Pakistan
- ODI debut (cap 10): 13 July 1974 v England
- Last ODI: 2 June 1982 v England

Career statistics
Competition	Test	ODI
Matches	91	25
Runs scored	6,080	439
Batting average	41.93	19.95
100s/50s	14/35	0/2
Top score	222	75
Balls bowled	70	–
Wickets	1	–
Bowling average	46.00	–
5 wickets in innings	0	–
10 wickets in match	0	–
Best bowling	1/11	–
Catches/stumpings	63/–	3/–
- Source: ESPNcricinfo, 4 February 2006

Gundappa Ranganath Viswanath (born 12 February 1949) is a former Indian cricketer. Vishwanath is rated as one of India's finest batsmen throughout the 1970s. Viswanath played Test cricket for India from 1969 to 1983, making 91 appearances and scoring more than 6,000 runs. He also played in One Day Internationals from 1974 to 1982, including the World Cups of 1975 and 1979.

At state level, he played for Karnataka (formerly Mysore) throughout his career. Viswanath, popularly nicknamed "Vishy", had an elegant and wristy batting style which emphasized timing rather than power. Though he had a complete repertoire of shots around the wicket, Viswanath's choice shot was the square cut, one he often used to great effect against fast bowlers. He regularly fielded at slip.

He is the only cricketer to score a double century on debut in a first-class match (against Andhra Pradesh in 1967) and a century on debut in a Test match. In 2008, he received the C. K. Nayudu Lifetime Achievement Award, the highest honour Indian board can bestow on a former player.

== Career and highlights ==
On his Test match debut, Viswanath scored a century against Australia at Kanpur in 1969 in a drawn match. He also recorded a duck in the same game, one of only four batsmen to have done this in their first match. Viswanath is the first and only player to score a double century on first-class debut as well as a century on Test debut. His best performances tended to come on challenging pitches, and while some of his best innings did not result in centuries, they were still important to the team's success.

Against Australia and the West Indies, both known for their strong pace attacks, he had a batting average of over 50. He was at his peak in the mid-1970s. Against the West Indies at Madras in 1974–75 he scored 97 not out out of a total of 190 against a bowling attack containing Andy Roberts. Despite not being a century, it was regarded as one of the finest performances by an Indian and it led to an Indian victory. The Wisden 100 ranked it the 38th best innings of all time, and the second best non-century. He scored a match-winning century in the previous Test at Calcutta, but despite a 95 in the final Test at Bombay the series was lost 3–2.

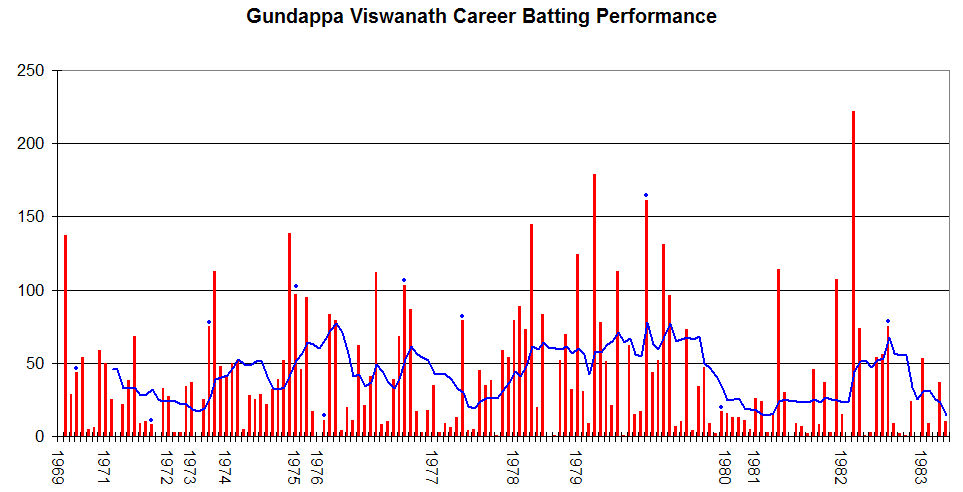
Gundappa Viswanath's career performance graph.

In 1975–76, Viswanath again produced some strong performances against the West Indies, the most notable of which was his 112 at Port of Spain which helped India to reach the victory target of 403. At the time, this was the highest successful run-chase in Test cricket. In 1978–79 at Madras he again top scored with 124 out of a total of 255. India went on to win the match which ultimately led to a 1–0 series victory in the 6-match series, although this West Indian side was considerably weaker than in previous series after many players opted to play in World Series Cricket instead.

== Captaincy ==
Viswanath also had a brief stint as the Indian captain in 1979–80. In the two Tests he captained, one was drawn and one was lost, the latter being the Golden Jubilee Test against England. In this match he recalled Bob Taylor to the crease after the umpire had already given him out. Taylor went on to score some vital runs for England helping them to win the match.

== Personal life ==
In March 1978, Gundappa Viswanath married Kavita, the sister of teammate Sunil Gavaskar. They have a son named Daivik and live in Bengaluru.

== Post-retirement ==
Viswanath retired from Tests in 1983, and later served as a match referee for the ICC from 1999 to 2004. He was also the chairman of the national selection committee, and also served as the manager of the Indian cricket team. He is also involved in cricket coaching at the National Cricket Academy (NCA) and has served as vice-president of the Karnataka State Cricket Association (KSCA).

== Bibliography ==
On 12 March 2022, his autobiography titled 'Wrist Assured' was launched during the opening day of the second Test between India and Sri Lanka in Bangalore. The book was unveiled by his former teammates Kapil Dev and Sunil Gavaskar in a brief ceremony held during the dinner break of the day/night game.

== Recognition ==
Viswanath was awarded Col. C. K. Nayudu Lifetime Achievement Award in 2009 by BCCI which is one of the highest awards given in Indian cricket. He also received the Padma Shri award by Government of India in 1971, and Arjuna award in the year 1977–78.

== See also ==
- List of double centuries scored on first-class cricket debut

Preceded by Sunil Gavaskar	Indian National Test Cricket Captain; 1979/80	Succeeded by Sunil Gavaskar
Preceded by Unknown	Chairman, Selection Committee; Unknown – September 1996	Succeeded by Ramakant Desai
