= Jiban Ghosh (umpire) =

Indian cricket umpire (1935–2004)

Personal information
- Full name: Jiban Dhan Ghosh
- Born: 6 October 1935
- Died: 15 December 2004 (aged 69)

Umpiring information
- Tests umpired: 4 (1979–1986)
- ODIs umpired: 3 (1981–1984)
- Source: ESPNcricinfo, 6 July 2013

Jiban Ghosh (6 October 1935 – 15 December 2004) was an Indian cricket umpire. He officiated in seven international fixtures, including four Test matches between 1979 and 1986 and three One Day Internationals between 1981 and 1984.

== See also ==
- List of Test cricket umpires
- List of One Day International cricket umpires
