= Ram Punjabi =

Indian cricket umpire (1928–2018)

Papan Panjabi
Personal information
- Full name: Papan Ramchand Panjabi
- Born: 10 June 1928
- Died: 25 February 2018 (aged 89); New Jersey, United States

Umpiring information
- Tests umpired: 7 (1978–1981)
- ODIs umpired: 2 (1982–1982)
- Source: Cricinfo, 15 July 2013

Papan Panjabi (10 June 1928 – 25 February 2018) was an Indian cricket umpire. He stood in seven Test matches between 1978 and 1981 and two One Day Internationals in 1982.

== See also ==
- List of Test cricket umpires
- List of One Day International cricket umpires
