= Madhav Gothoskar =

Indian cricket umpire (born 1929)

Personal information
- Full name: Madhav V. Gothoskar
- Born: 30 October 1929 (age 97); Bombay, British India

Umpiring information
- Tests umpired: 14 (1973–1983)
- ODIs umpired: 1 (1981)
- Source: ESPNcricinfo, 6 July 2013

Madhav Gothoskar (born 30 October 1929) is an Indian former cricket umpire, born in Bombay.

In his international umpiring career, Gothoskar stood in 14 Test matches from 1973 to 1983. He officiated in his only ODI game in 1981. In all, he umpired 58 first-class matches between 1967 and 1983.

During a Test in Bangalore in September 1983, after Zaheer Abbas led the Pakistan team off the field late on the last day in the mistaken belief that the match should be declared over at that point, Gothoskar told him to bring the team back onto the field or the match would be awarded to India. The Pakistan team returned to the field.

Gothoskar wrote his umpiring memoirs, The Burning Finger, in 1992. In 2021, he was honoured for his contribution to Indian cricket by the Cricketers' Foundation.

== See also ==
- List of Test cricket umpires
