= Kasturi Ramaswami =

Indian cricket umpire (born 1929)

K.B. Ramaswamy
Personal information
- Full name: Komandur Bhasyam Iyengar Ramaswamy
- Born: 20 February 1929 (age 97); Chennai, Tamilnadu
- Role: umpire

Umpiring information
- Tests umpired: 8 (1976–1983)
- ODIs umpired: 2 (1982)
- Source: ESPNcricinfo, 15 July 2013

K.B. Ramaswamy (born 20 February 1929) is a former Indian cricket umpire. In an international umpiring career that started in 1976, Ramaswamy stood in eight Test matches between 1976 and 1983 and two ODI games, in 1982.

== See also ==
- List of Test cricket umpires
- List of One Day International cricket umpires
