= S. N. Hanumantha Rao =

Indian cricket umpire (1929–2013)

Personal information
- Born: 4 September 1929; Kolar, Mysore, British India
- Died: 29 July 2013 (aged 83); Bangalore, Karnataka, India

Umpiring information
- Tests umpired: 9 (1978–1983)
- ODIs umpired: 2 (1981–1982)
- FC umpired: 36 (1959–1983)
- LA umpired: 9 (1978–1982)
- Source: Cricinfo, 2 August 2013

S. N. Hanumantha Rao (4 September 1929 – 29 July 2013) was an Indian cricket umpire. At the international level, Rao stood in nine Test matches from 1978 to 1983 and two ODI games between 1981 and 1982. Rao made his first-class umpiring debut aged 29, in the 1958–59 edition of the Ranji Trophy. He went on to umpire in 36 first-class matches over a 24-year career.

== See also ==
- List of Test cricket umpires
- List of One Day International cricket umpires
