= Green Park Stadium =

Cricket stadium

Green Park Cricket Stadium
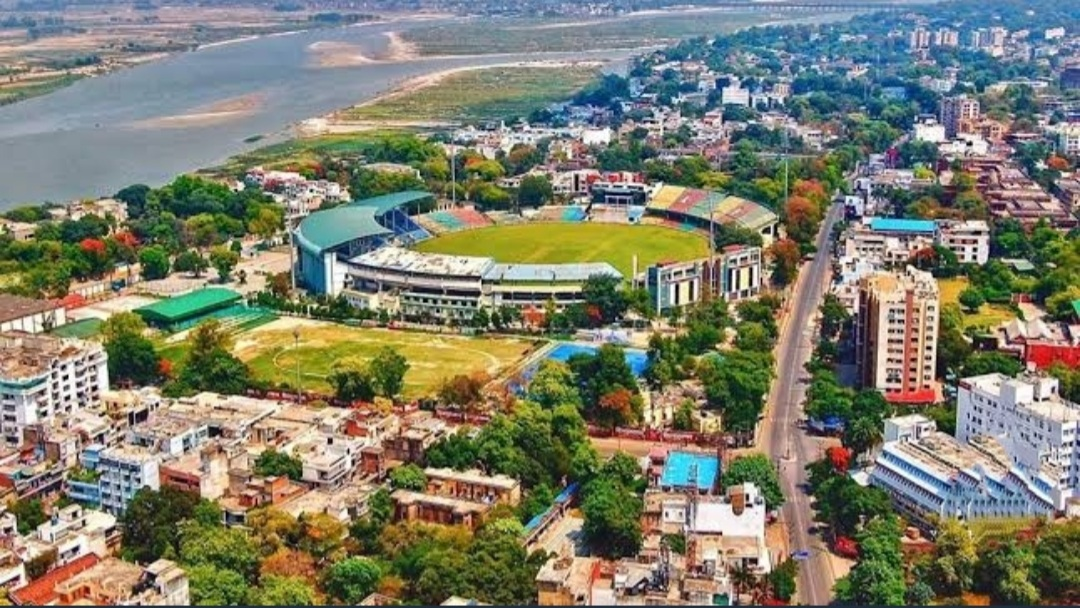
- Interactive map of Green Park Cricket Stadium

Ground information
- Location: Kanpur, Uttar Pradesh, India
- Country: India
- Coordinates: 26°28′55″N 80°20′52″E
- Establishment: 1945
- Capacity: 32,000
- Owner: Uttar Pradesh Government
- Operator: UPCA
- Tenants: Uttar Pradesh cricket team India national cricket team India women's national cricket team Gujarat Lions (defunct); Kanpur Superstars
- End names
- Media End; River End

International information
- First men's Test: 12–14 January 1952: India v England
- Last men's Test: 27 September – 1 October 2024: India v Bangladesh
- First men's ODI: 24 December 1986: India v Sri Lanka
- Last men's ODI: 29 October 2017: India v New Zealand
- Only men's T20I: 26 January 2017: India v England

Team information
Uttar Pradesh Cricket Team	(2009 – Present)
India national cricket team	(2009-Present)
Gujarat Lions (defunct)	(2016-2017)
- As of 27 September 2024; Source: ESPNcricinfo

Green Park Stadium is an international cricket stadium in Kanpur, Uttar Pradesh, India. It has a seating capacity of approximately 32,000. It is the home ground of the Uttar Pradesh cricket team. It is located in the Civil Lines area in the northeast part of Kanpur near the banks of the river Ganga, which flows just behind the stadium.

Controlled by the Sports Department of Uttar Pradesh, Green Park has hosted numerous international cricket matches across Test, One Day International (ODI), and Twenty20 International (T20I) formats. The stadium hosted the 500th Test played by the Indian team. It also hosted four Indian Premier League (IPL) matches in 2016 and 2017. As of 19 August 2017, it has hosted 22 Tests, 14 ODIs, and 1 T20I.

== History ==
The stadium was named after a British woman named Green, who practiced horseback riding at the site. It is nicknamed the 'Billiards Table', and 'Woolmer's turf' after the late cricket coach and player Bob Woolmer, who was born in the McRobert Hospital opposite the stadium.

It is the only stadium in India where a student gallery is available. Green Park has the largest manually operated scoreboard in the world. It also has video screens that are used during international matches.

India's first Test win over Australia in December 1959 was at the Green Park ground. This was also the first match to be played on a turf wicket here.

Since 1957, India has lost only two Test matches at Kanpur, both to the West Indies (in 1958 and 1983).

== Infrastructure ==
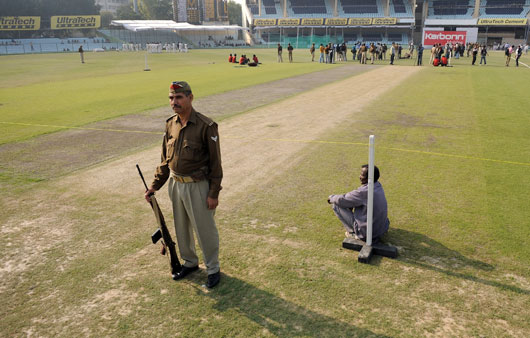
The pitch of Green Park Stadium

The bowling ends are known as the Mill Pavilion End and the Hostel End, named after the nearby Elgin Mill and DAV College, respectively.

Lakshmi (also known as Gulee) is the head of the Women's Cricket Division.

== Records ==
- Hosted a 1987 Cricket World Cup Group B match between the West Indies and Sri Lanka.
- Hosted a 1989 Nehru Cup match between England and India.
- Hosted the opening match of the 1993 Hero Cup between Sri Lanka and India.
- Hosted a Wills world series 1994–95 match between the West Indies and India.
- India registered its 100th Test victory at this venue, defeating Sri Lanka by an innings and 144 runs.
- Hosted India's 500th Test match in September 2016, with India defeating New Zealand by 197 runs.
- Sourav Ganguly took five wickets against Zimbabwe in 2000.
- In January 2002, India won a match against England; this was the only match where Anil Kumble served as the Indian captain.
- Hosted its first day/night ODI on 29 October 2017, with India defeating New Zealand by six runs.
- The highest ODI team total at the stadium is 337/7, scored by India against New Zealand on 29 October 2017.
- Rohit Sharma is the only batsman to score two ODI centuries at this ground.
- In November 2021, Shreyas Iyer scored a century in the first innings and a half-century in the second innings during his debut Test match against New Zealand.

== Gallery ==
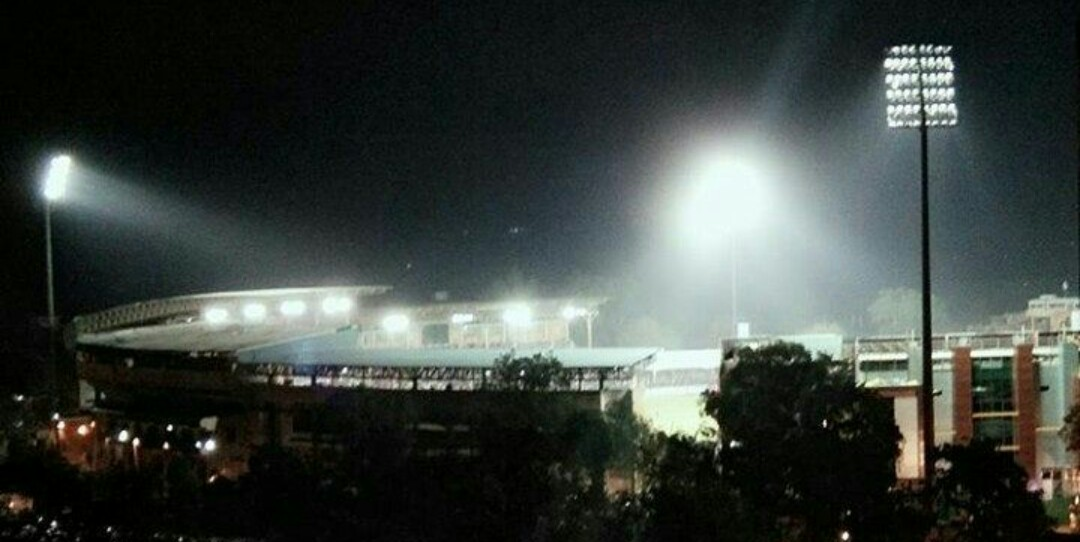
Kanpur's Green Park Stadium during a day/night cricket match

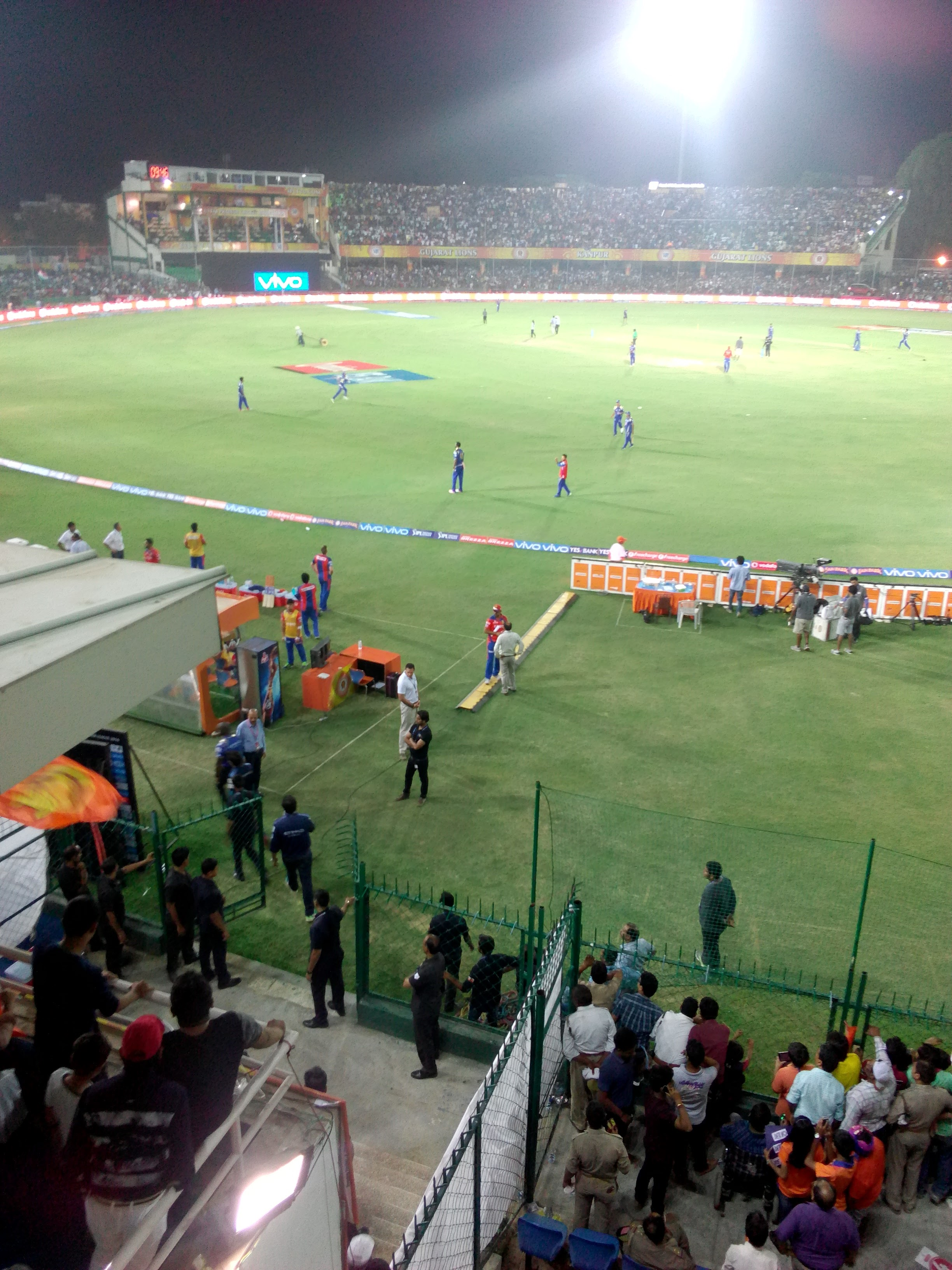
Green Park Stadium during a Gujarat Lions vs Mumbai Indians IPL match

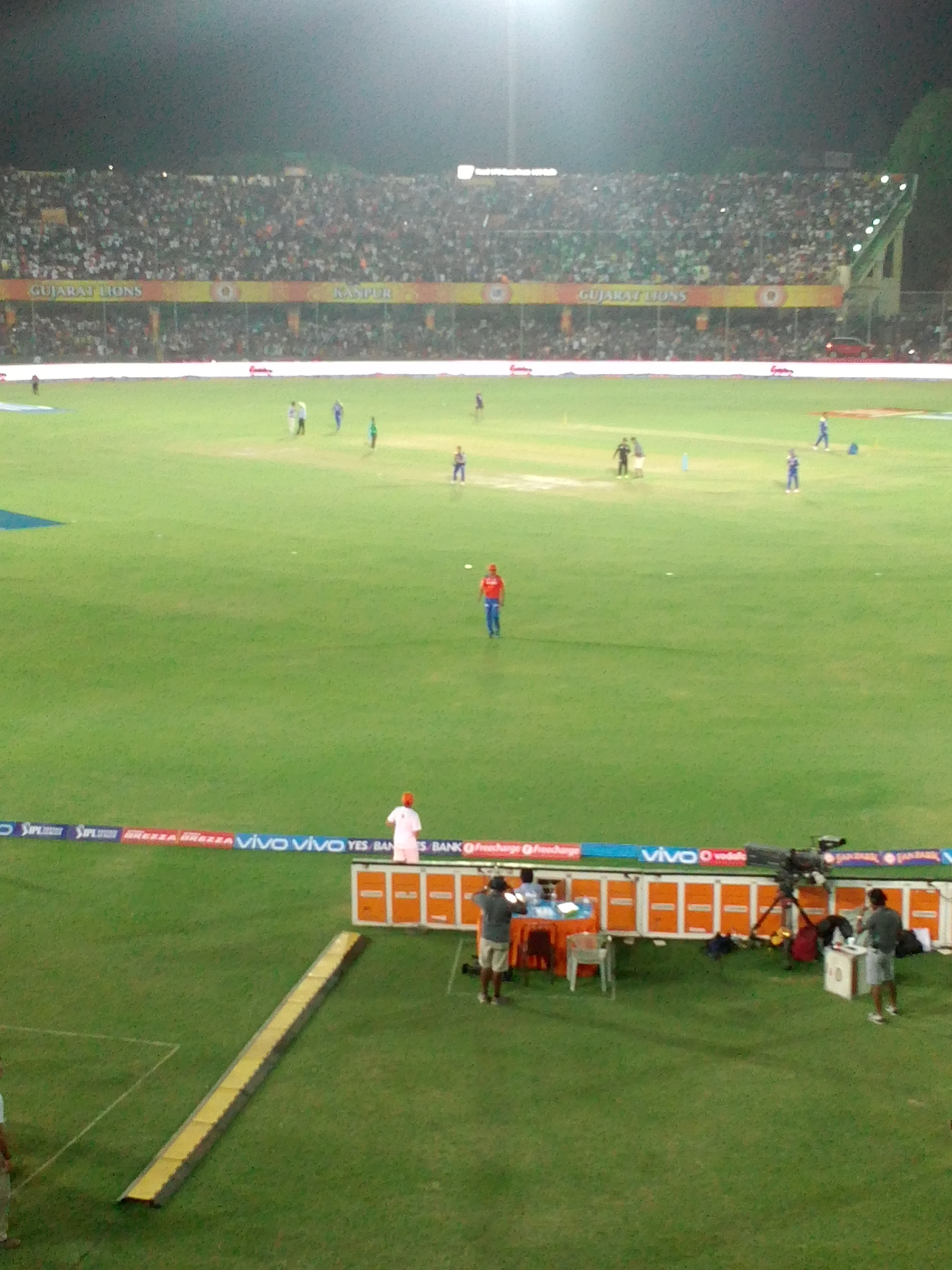
Green Park Stadium during Gujarat Lions vs Mumbai Indians IPL match

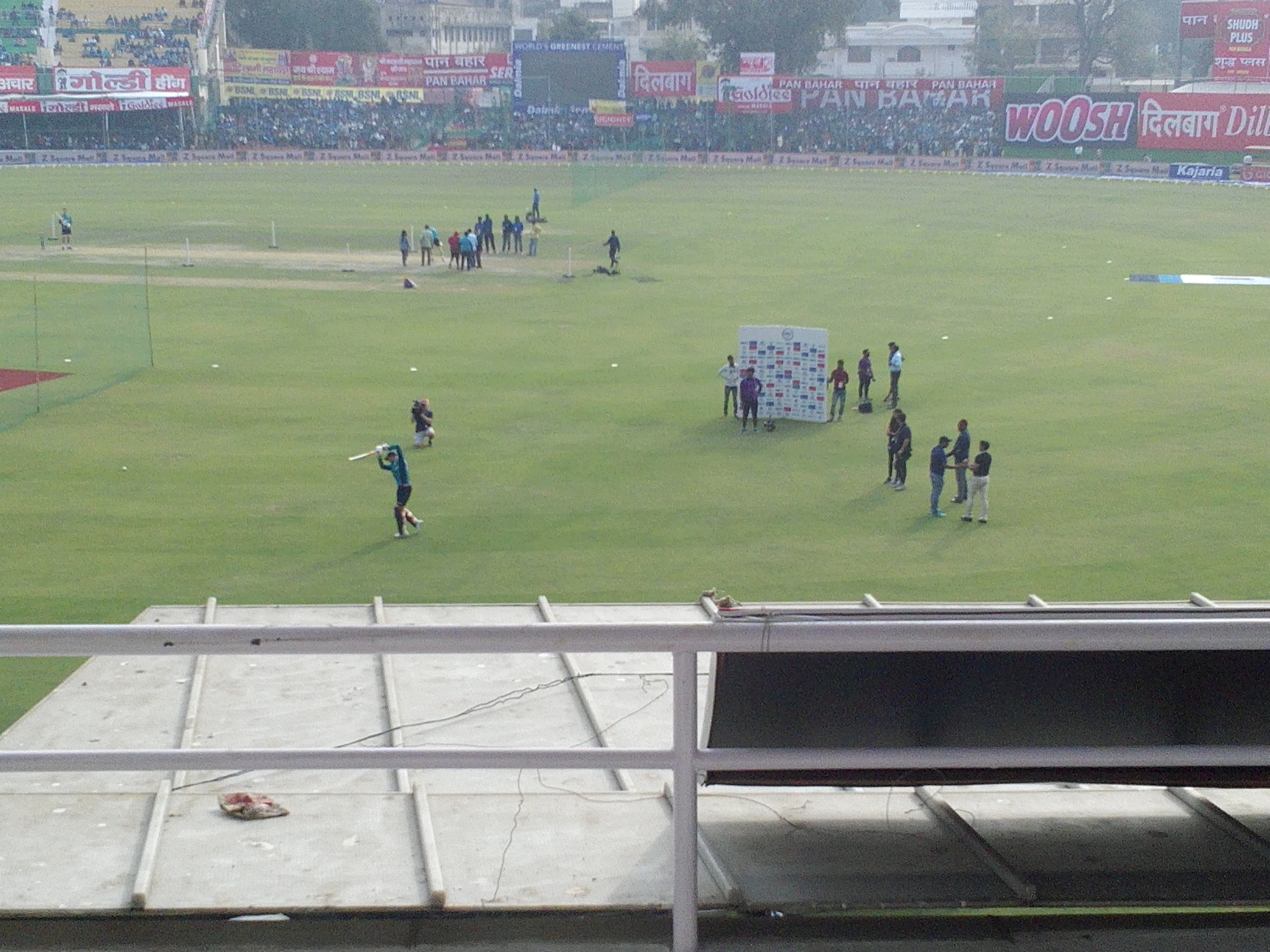
England vs India T20 match practice session at Green Park Stadium

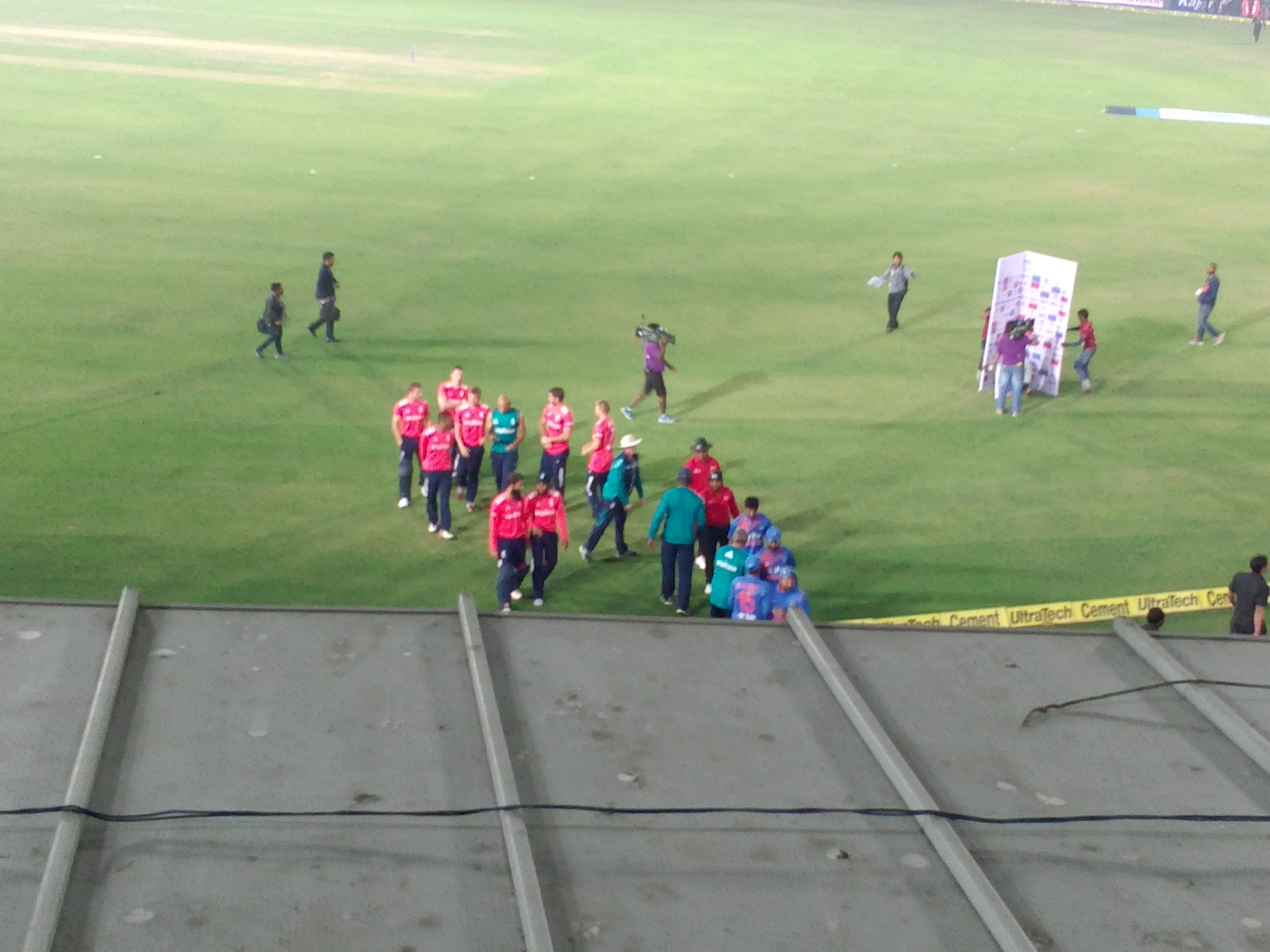
England vs India T20 match at Green Park Stadiumd

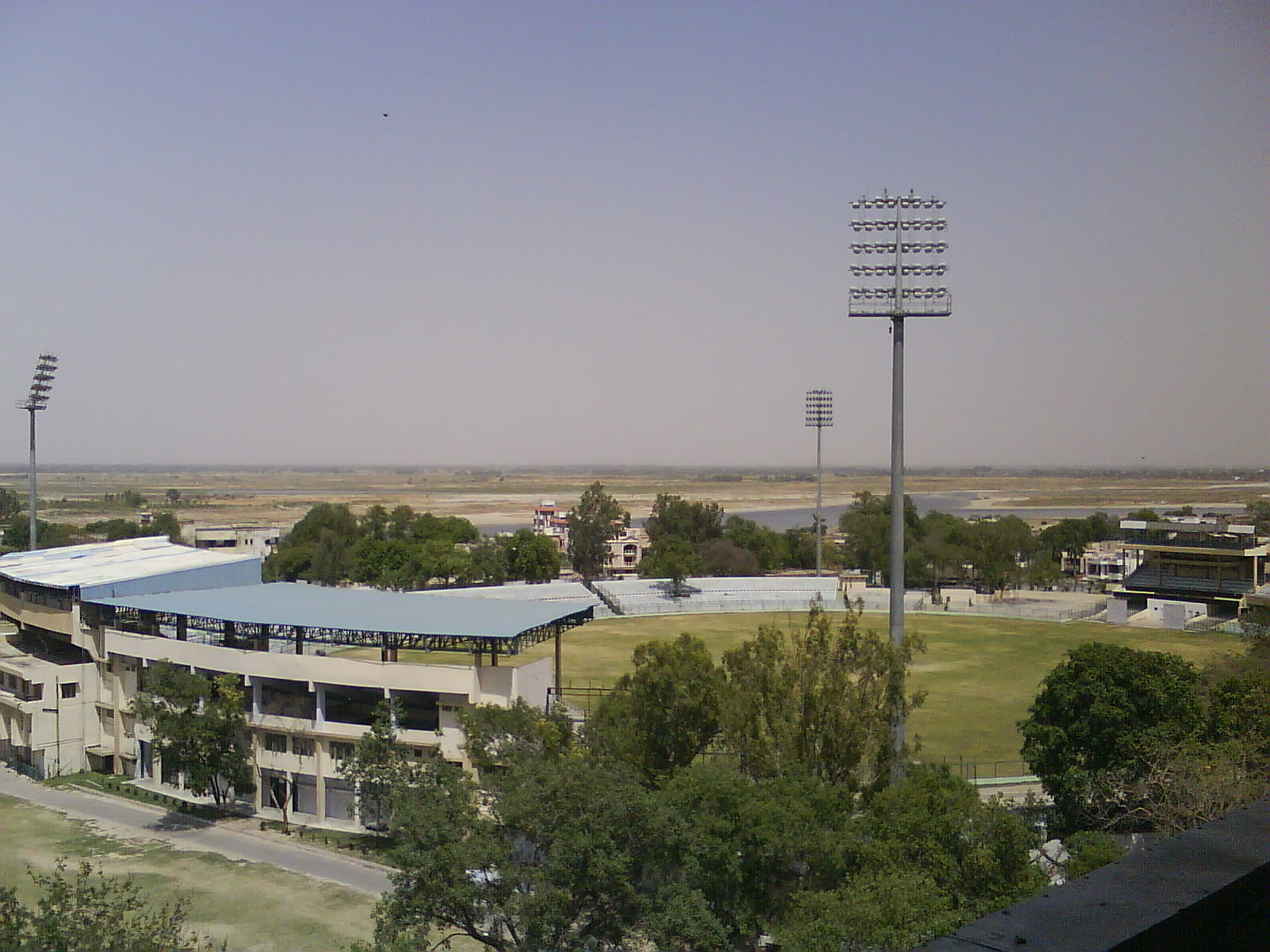
Green Park Stadium in 2002

== See also ==
- Ekana Cricket Stadium
- List of Test cricket grounds
