= 1988–89 Ranji Trophy =

Cricket tournament

1988-89 Ranji Trophy
- The Ranji Trophy, which the winners get.
- Dates: 13 October 1988 – 28 March 1989
- Administrator: BCCI
- Cricket format: First-class cricket
- Tournament format(s): League and knockout
- Champions: Delhi (5th title)
- Participants: 27
- Most runs: Woorkeri Raman (Tamil Nadu) (1,018)
- Most wickets: Manoj Prabhakar (Delhi) (39)

The 1988–89 Ranji Trophy was the 55th season of the Ranji Trophy, the premier first-class cricket tournament that took place in India between October 1988 and March 1989. Delhi defeated Bengal by an innings and 210 runs in the final.

Sachin Tendulkar made his first-class debut in this season, in December 1988. Playing for Bombay at home in the Wankhede Stadium against Gujarat, he made a century in his debut innings, scoring 100 not out off 129 balls, becoming the youngest Indian to do to so.

== Group stage ==
=== North Zone ===
Team	Pld	W	L	D	T	NR	Pts	Q
Delhi	5	3	0	2	0	0	94	2.577
Punjab	5	3	0	2	0	0	77	1.740
Haryana	5	2	0	3	0	0	71	1.338
Services	5	0	2	3	0	0	49	0.712
Jammu and Kashmir	5	0	3	2	0	0	36	0.611
Himachal Pradesh	5	0	2	3	0	0	25	0.387

=== Central Zone ===
Team	Pld	W	L	D	T	NR	Pts	Q
Uttar Pradesh	4	2	0	2	0	0	54	1.122
Madhya Pradesh	4	2	1	1	0	0	54	1.104
Railways	4	1	0	3	0	0	52	1.402
Vidarbha	4	0	1	3	0	0	31	0.705
Rajasthan	4	0	3	1	0	0	28	0.793

=== East Zone ===
Team	Pld	W	L	D	T	NR	Pts	Q
Bengal	4	2	0	2	0	0	65	2.624
Orissa	4	2	1	1	0	0	60	1.393
Bihar	4	1	0	3	0	0	51	1.152
Assam	4	1	1	2	0	0	37	0.801
Tripura	4	0	4	0	0	0	11	0.263

=== South Zone ===
Team	Pld	W	L	D	T	NR	Pts	Q
Tamil Nadu	5	3	0	2	0	0	81	2.602
Hyderabad	5	1	1	3	0	0	78	1.455
Karnataka	5	1	1	3	0	0	52	0.889
Andhra	5	1	1	3	0	0	51	0.774
Goa	5	0	0	5	0	0	44	0.690
Kerala	5	0	3	2	0	0	43	0.657

=== West Zone ===
Team	Pld	W	L	D	T	NR	Pts	Q
Maharashtra	4	1	0	3	0	0	55	1.762
Bombay	4	0	0	4	0	0	46	1.246
Gujarat	4	0	0	4	0	0	32	0.616
Baroda	4	0	1	3	0	0	31	1.003
Saurashtra	4	0	0	4	0	0	31	0.732

== Knockout stage ==
Pre-Quarter-finals
3 Feb 1989 — Secunderabad
Hyderabad	270 & 268
Bombay	283 & 256/4
3 Feb 1989 — Pune
Maharashtra	700
Madhya Pradesh	261 & 177

Quarter-finals
17 Feb 1989 — Bombay
Bombay	234 & 422
Uttar Pradesh	137 & 295
17 Feb 1989 — Delhi
Delhi	638/6d
Orissa	161 & 262
17 Feb 1989 — Calcutta
Bengal (F)	594/8d & 66/2
Punjab	551
17 Feb 1988 — Madras
Tamil Nadu	507 & 247
Maharashtra	382 & 333

Semi-finals
3 Mar 1989 — Bombay
Bombay	321
Delhi (F)	409 & 176/5
3 Mar 1989 — Calcutta
Bengal (F)	596/8d & 76/1
Tamil Nadu	535

Finals
22 Mar 1989 — Delhi
Delhi	721
Bengal	167 & 344

(F) - Advanced to next round on First Innings Lead.

=== Pre-quarter-finals ===
3–6 February 1989
Pre-quarter-final 1
Scorecard

Hyderabad	v	Bombay
270 (71 overs); M. V. Narasimha Rao 66*; Kiran Mokashi 4/65 (22 overs)		283 (87.3 overs); Dilip Vengsarkar 64; Arshad Ayub 6/129 (38.3 overs)
268 (75.5 overs); Arshad Ayub 69; Kiran Mokashi 5/109 (28 overs)		259/4 (87.5 overs); Sanjay Manjrekar 80*; Venkatapathy Raju 3/118 (40 overs)

Bombay won by 6 wickets
Gymkhana Ground, Secunderabad
Umpires: P. S. Godbole and R. Mitra

- Hyderabad won the toss and elected to bat.

3–6 February 1989
Pre-quarter-final 1
Scorecard

Madhya Pradesh	v	Maharashtra
261 (55.4 overs); Sandeep Patil 68; Salil Ankola 5/93 (17.4 overs)		700 (164.5 overs); Shantanu Sugwekar 299*; Suhail Ansari 3/69 (26 overs)
177 (38.2 overs); Prashant Dwivedi 50; Gregory D'Monte 5/60 (15 overs)

Maharashtra won by an innings and 262 runs
Nehru Stadium, Pune
Umpires: D. V. Pathak and V. S. Rajan

- Madhya Pradesh won the toss and elected to bat.

=== Quarter-finals ===
17–20 February 1989
Quarter-final 1
Scorecard

Tamil Nadu	v	Maharashtra
507 (135.5 overs); Woorkeri Raman 200*; Sunil Gudge 5/122 (28.5 overs)		382 (96 overs); Surendra Bhave 128; Sunil Subramaniam 7/107 (31.1 overs)
247 (69 overs); Arjan Kripal Singh 89; Ramesh Hazare 7/68 (27 overs)		333 (64.1 overs); Shrikant Jadhav 86; Bharat Arun 4/75 (14.1 overs)

Tamil Nadu won by 39 runs
M. A. Chidambaram Stadium, Chennai
Umpires: Nilay Dutta and Ram Babu Gupta

- Tamil Nadu won the toss and elected to bat.
- Woorkeri Raman and V. Sivaramakrishan (both Tamil Nadu) and Shrikant Jadhav (Maharashtra) passed 2,000, 6,000 and 1,000 runs respectively in first-class matches.
- Bharat Arun (Tamil Nadu) reached 100 wickets in first-class matches.

17–20 February 1989
Quarter-final 2
Scorecard

Bengal	v	Punjab
594/8d (171 overs); Ashok Malhotra 200*; Bhupinder Singh 3/115 (43 overs)		551 (174.1 overs); Gursharan Singh 298*; Satyendra Singh 4/94 (36.1 overs)
66/2 (16 overs); Indu Bhushan Roy 31*; Rajdeep Kalsi 1/9 (2 overs)

Match drawn
(Bengal won on 1st innings)
Eden Gardens, Calcutta
Umpires: B. Jamula and B. R. Keshavamurthy

- Bengal won the toss and elected to bat.
- Sukhvinder Tinku (Punjab) made his first-class debut.
- Indu Bhushan Roy (Bengal) and Gursharan Singh (Punjab) passed 1,000 and 3,000 runs respectively in first-class matches.

17–20 February 1989
Quarter-final 3
Scorecard

Bombay	v	Uttar Pradesh
234 (67.1 overs); Shishir Hattangadi 140; Gopal Sharma 4/81 (23 overs)		137 (59.4 overs); Sunil Chaturvedi 47; Kiran Mokashi 4/34 (18.4 overs)
422 (138.5 overs); Sanjay Manjrekar 131; Gopal Sharma 7/113 (51.5 overs)		295 (111.5 overs); Rahul Sapru 92*; Kiran Mokashi 4/104 (38.5 overs)

Bombay won by 224 runs
Wankhede Stadium, Bombay
Umpires: S. K. Bansal and Soumendra Basu

- Bombay won the toss and elected to bat.
- Satish Kesherwani (Uttar Pradesh) made his first-class debut.

17–20 February 1989
Quarter-final 4
Scorecard

Orissa	v	Delhi
161 (65 overs); Asjit Jaiprakasham 35; Manoj Prabhakar 6/65 (24 overs)		638/6d (161 overs); Raman Lamba 180; Sushil Kumar Prasad 3/220 (61 overs)
262 (87 overs); Soumitra Chowdhury 79; Manoj Prabhakar 4/42 (14 overs)

Delhi won by an innings and 215 runs
Feroz Shah Kotla, Delhi
Umpires: M. G. Deshpande and S. B. Kulkarni

- Orissa won the toss and elected to bat.
- Devashish Mahanti (Orissa) made his first-class debut.

=== Semi-finals ===
Delhi qualified for the final for the tenth time by virtue of a first innings lead after its match against Bombay ended in a draw. Requiring 152 runs to surpass Delhi's first innings score of 409, Bombay were dismissed for 321, that included a fighting 78 off 171 balls by Sachin Tendulkar.

Bengal made it to their ninth final, their first since the 1971–72 competition, also by virtue of a first innings lead, against Tamil Nadu. Earlier in Tamil Nadu's innings, Woorkeri Raman scored 238, recording his third double century in as many matches. In the process, he broke the 45-year-old record of Rusi Modi for most runs in a single season of the competition (1,008). Gautam Shome, who played his first game of the season for Bengal, removed Raman and P. C. Prakash before Tamil Nadu were dismissed 61 runs short of Bengal's first innings tally.

3–6 March 1989
1st Semi-final
Scorecard

Delhi	v	Bombay
409 (170.3 overs); Manoj Prabhakar 123; Raju Kulkarni 5/90 (30.3 overs)		321 (99.2 overs); Sachin Tendulkar 78 (171); Maninder Singh 7/105 (37 overs)
176/5 (75 overs); Bhaskar Pillai 49; Ravi Thakkar 2/54 (24 overs)

Match drawn
(Delhi won on 1st innings)
Wankhede Stadium, Bombay
Umpires: R. V. Ramani and Ivaturi Shivram

- Delhi won the toss and elected to bat.
- Sanjay Sharma (Delhi) made his first-class debut.
- Shishir Hattangadi (Bombay) passed 3,000 runs in first-class matches.

3–6 March 1989
2nd Semi-final
Scorecard

Bengal	v	Tamil Nadu
596/8d (182 overs); Rajinder Singh 148; Divakar Vasu 3/149 (50 overs)		535 (140 overs); Woorkeri Raman 238; Gautam Shome 4/135 (33 overs)
76/1 (23 overs); Indu Roy 52; Arjan Kripal Singh 1/15 (4 overs)

Match drawn
(Bengal won on 1st innings)
Eden Gardens, Calcutta
Umpires: S. B. Kulkarni and Piloo Reporter

- Bengal won the toss and elected to bat.
- Arup Bhattacharya (Bengal) passed 1,000 runs in first-class matches.
- Woorkeri Raman (Tamil Nadu) scored his third successive double century.
- P. C. Prakash and Raman set a record for the highest partnership for the third wicket for Tamil Nadu, surpassing C. D. Gopinath and A. G. Milkha Singh's 248.

=== Final ===
22–26 March 1989
Scorecard

Bengal	v	Delhi (H)
167 (62.2 overs); Sambaran Banerjee 55; Manoj Prabhakar 4/40 (20.2 overs)		721 (191.1 overs); Bhaskar Pillai 199; Sagarmoy Sensharma 3/94 (31 overs)
344 (74.4 overs); Rajinder Singh 79; Kirti Azad 3/28 (5.4 overs)

Delhi won by an innings and 210 runs
Feroz Shah Kotla, Delhi
Umpires: Dara Dotiwalla and R. S. Rathore
Player of the match: Bhaskar Pillai (Delhi)

- Bengal won the toss and elected to bat.
- Kirti Azad (Delhi) passed 5,000 runs in first-class matches.
