= Pakistani cricket team in India in 1986–87 =

International cricket tour

Pakistan cricket team in India in 1986-87
- Date: 23 January – 26 March 1987
- Location: India
- Result: Pakistan won 5-match test series 1-0 Pakistan won 6-match ODI series 5-1
Teams
- India: Pakistan
Captains
- Kapil Dev: Imran Khan
Most runs
- Dilip Vengsarkar (404) Mohammad Azharuddin (315) K Srikkanth (311): Rameez Raja (381); Imran Khan (324); Javed Miandad (302)
Most wickets
- Maninder Singh (20) Kapil Dev (11) Ravi Shastri (9): Tauseef Ahmed (16); Wasim Akram (13); Iqbal Qasim (12)

The Pakistan national cricket team toured India in the 1986-87 season to play five Test matches and six One Day International matches. They also played three first-class matches.

Pakistan won the Test series 1-0 after they were victorious by 16 runs in the final match of the series, the previous four games having been drawn.

Pakistan were captained by Imran Khan who was voted "Man of the Series". It was last test series of Indian opener Sunil Gavaskar.

== Test matches ==
=== 1st Test ===
3–8 February 1987
Scorecard

Pakistan	v	India
487/9d (163 overs); Imran Khan 135* (230); Maninder Singh 5/135 (59 overs)		527/9d (170 overs); Krishnamachari Srikkanth 123 (149); Tauseef Ahmed 3/189 (67 overs)
182/3 (77 overs); Rizwan-uz-Zaman 54*; Maninder Singh 2/47 (26 overs)

Match drawn
MA Chidambaram Stadium, Madras
Umpires: Rajan Mehra (Ind) and V. K. Ramaswamy (Ind)
Player of the match: Imran Khan (Pak) and Krishnamachari Srikkanth (Ind)

- Pakistan won the toss and decided to bat.
- Ijaz Ahmed (Pak) made his Test debut.
- Shoaib Mohammad (Pak) scored his first century in Tests.
- Imran Khan and Wasim Akram's partnership of 112 runs in Pakistan's first innings was the country's record for the eighth wicket against India.
- Krishnamachari Srikkanth and Sunil Gavaskar's (Ind) partnership of 200 runs in their first innings was the highest for the first wicket against Pakistan by any country.
- 5 February was a rest day

=== 2nd Test ===
11–16 February 1987
scorecard

India	v	Pakistan
403 (118 overs); Mohammad Azharuddin 141; Wasim Akram 5/96 (31 overs)		229 (108.1 overs); Rameez Raja 69; Roger Binny 6/56 (25.1 overs)
181/3 d. (52.1 overs); Arun Lal 70; Imran Khan 2/28 (7.1 overs)		179/5 (87 overs); Javed Miandad 63; Roger Binny 2/45 (21 overs)

Match drawn
Eden Gardens, Calcutta
Umpires: RB Gupta, PD Reporter
Player of the match: Roger Binny

- Pakistan won the toss and decided to field

=== 3rd Test ===
21–26 February 1987
scorecard

India	v	Pakistan
465/8 d. (163.3 overs); Ravi Shastri 125; Imran Khan 2/93 (35 overs)		341 (128.5 overs); Rameez Raja 114; Gopal Sharma 4/88 (32.5 overs)
114/2 (38 overs); K Srikkanth 51; Iqbal Qasim 1/34 (13 overs)

Match drawn
Sawai Mansingh Stadium, Jaipur
Umpires: VK Ramaswamy, PD Reporter
Player of the match: Ravi Shastri

- India won the toss and decided to bat

=== 4th Test ===
4–9 March 1987
scorecard

Pakistan	v	India
395 (187.3 overs); Ijaz Faqih 105; Shivlal Yadav 4/109 (48.3 overs)		323 (111.5 overs); Dilip Vengsarkar 109; Wasim Akram 4/60 (21.5 overs)
135/2 (99 overs); Rizwan-uz-Zaman 8 Maninder Singh 1/13 (23 overs)

Match drawn
Gujarat Stadium, Motera, Ahmedabad
Umpires: RB Gupta, SR Ramchandra Rao
Player of the match: Ijaz Faqih

- Pakistan won the toss and decided to bat

=== 5th Test ===
13–17 March 1987
scorecard

Pakistan	v	India
116 (49.2 overs); Saleem Malik 33; Maninder Singh 7/27 (18.2 overs)		145 (64 overs); Dilip Vengsarkar 50; Iqbal Qasim 5/48 (30 overs)
249 (94.5 overs); Rameez Raja 47; Ravi Shastri 4/69 (24 overs)		204 (93.5 overs); Sunil Gavaskar 96; Iqbal Qasim 4/73 (37 overs)

Pakistan won by 16 runs
M Chinnaswamy Stadium, Bangalore
Umpires: RB Gupta, VK Ramaswamy
Player of the match: Sunil Gavaskar

- Pakistan won the toss and decided to bat
- Pakistan won Test Series 1-0
- Saleem Yousuf & Tauseef Ahmed had a second innings partnership of 51 runs for the 9th wicket

== One Day Internationals (ODIs) ==
Pakistan won the Charminar Challenge Cup 5–1.

=== 1st ODI ===
27 January 1987
Scorecard

India; 196/7 (45 overs)	v	Pakistan; 200/7 (44 overs)
RJ Shastri 50 (68); Imran Khan 2/41 (10 overs)		Mudassar Nazar 43 (80); RJ Shastri 3/37 (10 overs)

Pakistan won by 3 wickets
Nehru Stadium, Indore
Umpires: S Banerjee and RB Gupta
Player of the match: Abdul Qadir (PAK)

- Pakistan won the toss and elected to field.
- The match was reduced from 50 overs to 45 overs.
- Ravi Shastri captained India in the absence of Kapil Dev

=== 2nd ODI ===
18 February 1987
Scorecard

India; 238/6 (40 overs)	v	Pakistan; 241/8 (39.3 overs)
K Srikkanth 123 (103); Wasim Akram 3/49 (10 overs)		Saleem Malik 72* (36); RJ Shastri 4/38 (10 overs)

Pakistan won by 2 wickets
Eden Gardens, Calcutta
Umpires: DN Dotiwalla and RV Ramani
Player of the match: Saleem Malik (PAK)

- Pakistan won the toss and elected to field.
- The match was reduced from 50 overs to 40 overs.
- Younis Ahmed (PAK) made his ODI debut.

=== 3rd ODI ===
20 March 1987
Scorecard

India; 212/6 (44 overs)	v	Pakistan; 212/7 (44 overs)
RJ Shastri 69* (74); Imran Khan 1/27 (9 overs)		Saleem Malik 84 (89); G Sharma 3/29 (6 overs)

Match tied (India won by losing fewer wickets)
Lal Bahadur Shastri Stadium, Hyderabad
Umpires: SK Ghosh and V Vikramraju
Player of the match: Not awarded

- Pakistan won the toss and elected to field.
- The match was reduced from 50 overs to 44 overs.

=== 4th ODI ===
22 March 1987
Scorecard

India; 120/9 (42 overs)	v	Pakistan; 121/4 (37.2 overs)
R Lamba 27 (62); Saleem Jaffar 3/25 (9 overs)		Rameez Raja 33 (74); Kapil Dev 2/32 (7 overs)

Pakistan won by 6 wickets
Nehru Stadium, Pune
Umpires: RR Kadam and SR Ramchandra Rao
Player of the match: Saleem Jaffar (PAK)

- India won the toss and elected to bat.
- The match was reduced before play started to 47 overs per side.
- The match was later reduced to 42 overs per side.

=== 5th ODI ===
24 March 1987
Scorecard

Pakistan; 286/6 (44 overs)	v	India; 245/9 (44 overs)
Javed Miandad 78 (88); Maninder Singh 2/43 (10 overs)		SM Gavaskar 70 (96); Wasim Akram 3/26 (10 overs)

Pakistan won by 41 runs
Vidarbha Cricket Association Ground, Nagpur
Umpires: SB Kulkarni and RS Rathore
Player of the match: Wasim Akram (PAK)

- India won the toss and elected to field.
- The match was reduced from 50 overs to 44 overs.
- Wasim Akram scored 25 runs off a Chetan Sharma over (2,6,6,6,4,1)

=== 6th ODI ===
26 March 1987
Scorecard

India; 265/3 (44 overs)	v	Pakistan; 266/5 (43.2 overs)
M Prabhakar 106 (121); Tauseef Ahmed 1/31 (5 overs)		Javed Miandad 78* (71); Kapil Dev 2/42 (9.2 overs)

Pakistan won by 5 wickets
Keenan Stadium, Jamshedpur
Umpires: S Banerjee and V Vikramraju
Player of the match: M Prabhakar (IND)

- Pakistan won the toss and elected to field.
- The match was reduced from 50 overs to 44 overs.

== External sources ==
- Cricarchive
- Tour page CricInfo
- Record CricInfo

== Sources ==
- Playfair Cricket Annual
- Wisden Cricketers' Almanack
