= Australian cricket team in India in 1986–87 =

International cricket tour

	India	Australia
- Dates: 30 August – 19 October 1986
Captains	Kapil Dev	Allan Border

Test series
- Result: 3-match series drawn 0–0
Most runs	Ravi Shastri (231)	Dean Jones (371)
Most wickets	Shivlal Yadav (8)	Greg Matthews (14)

One Day International series
- Results: India won the 6-match series 3–2
Most runs	Raman Lamba (278)	Allan Border (239)
Most wickets	Ravi Shastri (8)	Bruce Reid (8)
- Player of the series: Raman Lamba (Ind)

The Australian cricket team toured India in the 1986–87 season to play a three-match Test series and a five-match one day international series against India.

The Test series was drawn 0-0, with one tie, and India won the one-day series 3–2. It is best remembered for the tied first Test – only the second time this result has occurred in Test cricket.

== Australian squad ==
Australia had just lost two-Test series against New Zealand and only narrowly held on to a 0–0 draw against India during the 1985–86 summer. The team was in a rebuilding phase, with Bob Simpson having newly been appointed as coach. However Australia were not unfamiliar with Indian conditions having recently toured in 1984.

The original squad was selected by Lawrie Sawle, Greg Chappell, Jim Higgs and Bobby Simpson. It was announced on 30 April 1986:

- Batsmen – Allan Border (captain), David Boon (vice-captain), Geoff Marsh, Dean Jones, Greg Ritchie, Mike Veletta
- Fastbowlers – Craig McDermott, Bruce Reid, Dave Gilbert, Simon Davis
- Spinners – Ray Bright
- All rounders – Greg Matthews, Steve Waugh
- Wicketkeepers – Tim Zoehrer, Greg Dyer
- Team officials – Bob Simpson (coach), Alan Crompton (tour manager), Errol Alcott (physio), Charlie Pinto (transport), Govind Bawji (baggageman)

A number of top-level Australian cricketers were unavailable for selection because they had signed to tour South Africa and were banned from playing international cricket.

Selection panel on tour: Border, Boon, Simpson

Wayne Phillips had been Australia's wicketkeeper over the 1985–86 summer, then replaced by Tim Zoehrer and tried as a batting specialist. However he was overlooked for selection – the only member of the New Zealand tour squad not picked to go to India. On the night of his non-selection Phillips told the media "I'm going to do what I want to do and not be at the beck and call of these idiots who pick the side." He was fined $2,000 by the Australian Cricket Board and never played cricket for Australia again.

Allan Border returned early from county cricket with Essex on 19 August to prepare for the tour. The Australian squad attended a special six day training camp with Simpson, Greg Chappell and Ashley Mallett.

== Test series summary ==
=== First Test ===
See Tied Test for details.

18–22 September 1986
(5-day match)
Scorecard

Australia	v	India
574/7d (170.5 overs); DM Jones 210 (330); NS Yadav 4/142 (49.5 overs)		397 (94.2 overs); Kapil Dev 119 (138); GRJ Matthews 5/103 (28.2 overs)
170/5d (49 overs); DC Boon 49 (92); Maninder Singh 3/60 (19 overs)		347 (86.5 overs); SM Gavaskar 90 (168); RJ Bright 5/94 (25 overs)

Match tied
M. A. Chidambaram Stadium, Madras
Umpires: DN Dotiwalla and V Vikramraju
Player of the match: Kapil Dev (IND)

- Australia won the toss and elected to bat.

=== Second Test ===
26–30 September 1986
(5-day match)
Scorecard

Australia	v	India
207/3d (75.4 overs); DC Boon 67 (149); RJ Shastri 2/44 (21.4 overs)		107/3 (26 overs); K Srikkanth 26 (41); CS Pandit 26 * (34); SR Waugh 1/29 (6 overs)

Match drawn
Feroz Shah Kotla Ground, Delhi
Umpires: VK Ramaswamy and PD Reporter

- Australia won the toss and elected to bat.
- There was no play on the first three days.

=== Third Test ===
15–19 October 1986
(5-day match)
Scorecard

Australia	v	India
345 (147.4 overs); GR Marsh 101 (300); NS Yadav 4/84 (41.4 overs)		517/5d (170 overs); DB Vengsarkar 164* (303); GRJ Matthews 4/158 (52 overs)
216/2 (88 overs); DM Jones 73* (164); RJ Shastri 2/60 (30 overs)

Match drawn
Wankhede Stadium, Bombay
Umpires: JD Ghosh and RB Gupta

- Australia won the toss and elected to bat.
- RR Kulkarni (IND) made his Test debut.

== ODI series ==
India won the Charminar Challenge Cup 3–2.

=== 1st ODI ===
7 September 1986 (N)
Scorecard

Australia; 250/3 (47 overs)	v	India; 251/3 (41 overs)
DC Boon 111 (118); M Azharuddin 1/53 (7 overs)		K Srikkanth 102 (104); BA Reid 1/27 (8 overs)

India won by 7 wickets
Sawai Mansingh Stadium, Jaipur
Umpires: S Banerjee and BR Nagaraja Rao
Player of the match: K Srikkanth (IND)

- India won the toss and elected to field.
- The match was reduced from 50 to 47 overs per side.
- R Lamba (IND) made his ODI debut.

=== 2nd ODI ===
9 September 1986
Scorecard

India; 222/8 (47 overs)	v	Australia; 226/7 (46 overs)
SM Gavaskar 52 (56); BA Reid 2/37 (10 overs)		AR Border 90* (106); RMH Binny 2/25 (8 overs)

Australia won by 3 wickets
Sher-i-Kashmir Stadium, Srinagar
Umpires: SB Kulkarni and RS Rathore
Player of the match: AR Border (AUS)

- Australia won the toss and elected to field.
- The match was reduced from 50 to 47 overs per side.

=== 3rd ODI ===
24 September 1986
Scorecard

Australia; 242/6 (47 overs)	v	India; 41/1 (10.4 overs)
GM Ritchie 75 (53); RJ Shastri 2/36 (10 overs)		R Lamba 20* (36); BA Reid 1/20 (4 overs)

No result
Lal Bahadur Shastri Stadium, Hyderabad
Umpires: RR Kadam and RV Ramani

- India won the toss and elected to field.
- The match was reduced from 50 to 47 overs per side.
- GC Dyer (AUS) and RP Singh (IND) made their ODI debuts.

=== 4th ODI ===
2 October 1986
Scorecard

Australia; 238/6 (45 overs)	v	India; 242/7 (43.3 overs)
SR Waugh 57* (53); Maninder Singh 2/30 (10 overs)		R Lamba 74 (68); BA Reid 3/43 (9 overs)

India won by 3 wickets
Feroz Shah Kotla Ground, Delhi
Umpires: AL Narasimhan and J Roy
Player of the match: R Lamba (IND)

- India won the toss and elected to field.
- The match was reduced from 50 to 45 overs per side.

=== 5th ODI ===
5 October 1986
Scorecard

India; 193 (47.4 overs)	v	Australia; 141 (43.3 overs)
RJ Shastri 53 (54); SP Davis 3/35 (9.4 overs)		GR Marsh 43 (96); AR Border 43 (64); Kapil Dev 2/17 (8 overs)

India won by 52 runs
Gujarat Stadium, Motera, Ahmedabad
Umpires: BR Keshavamurthy and MG Mukherjee
Player of the match: RJ Shastri (IND)

- India won the toss and elected to bat.

=== 6th ODI ===
7 October 1986
Scorecard

India; 260/6 (48 overs)	v	Australia; 263/3 (46.3 overs)
R Lamba 102 (120); SR Waugh 2/50 (10 overs)		AR Border 91* (88); RJ Shastri 1/50 (10 overs)

Australia won by 7 wickets
Municipal Stadium, Rajkot
Umpires: KR Karimanickam and N.N.Patwardhan
Player of the match: AR Border (AUS)

- Australia won the toss and elected to field.
- The match was reduced from 50 to 48 overs per side.

== Tour matches ==
- Board President's XI v Australians at Bangalore, 30 Aug-1 Sep 1986 – match drawn. Geoff Marsh scored a century and Matthews took five wickets in the game.
- Bombay v Australians at Gwalior, 3-5 Sep 1986 – match drawn. Greg Ritchie scored a century as opener and Matthews made 99.
- Indian Under-25 XI v Australians at Chandigarh, 12-14 Sep 1986 – match drawn
- Delhi v Australians at Baroda, 10-12 Oct 1986 – match drawn – Dave Gilbert scored a century.

== Summary ==
The tour established David Boon and Geoff Marsh as Australia's opening combination, and Dean Jones as a Test batsman. Greg Matthews appeared to establish his credentials as a top line spinner. Jones later argued the tied Test marked a turning point in Australian cricket, although Australia went on to lose the 1986–87 Ashes series 2–1. By the end of that series, Boon, Ritchie, Matthews, McDermott, Davis, Gilbert and Bright had all been dropped from the Australian Test team.

The experience gained by the players did prove valuable for Australia in their campaign to win the 1987 World Cup in India.
