= West Indian cricket team in India in 1987–88 =

International cricket tour

West Indies cricket team in India in 1987–88
	India	West Indies
- Dates: 25 November 1987 – 25 January 1988
Captains	Dileep Vengsarkar	Viv Richards

Test series
- Result: 4-match series drawn 1–1
Most runs	Dileep Vengsarkar (305)	Viv Richards (295)
Most wickets	Narendra Hirwani (16)	Courtney Walsh (26)

One Day International series
- Results: West Indies won the 7-match series 6–1
Most runs	Mohinder Amarnath (262)	Carl Hooper (250)
Most wickets	Patrick Patterson (17)	Ravi Shastri (9)

The West Indies national cricket team visited India in 1987–88 for a 4-match Test series and followed by 7 one day international matches along with a one-off benevolent fund match. The test series was drawn 1–1 and West Indies won the ODI series with 6–1.

== Test Series ==
=== 1st Test ===
25–29 November 1987
Scorecard

India	v	West Indies
75 (30.5 overs); Arun Lal 20 (44); Patrick Patterson 5/24 (8.5 overs)		127 (47.1 overs); Desmond Haynes 45 (143); Chetan Sharma 5/55 (13.1 overs)
327 (113.3 overs); Dileep Vengsarkar 102 (257); Courtney Walsh 5/54 (29.3 overs)		276/5 (85.3 overs); Viv Richards 109* (111); Arshad Ayub 4/72 (25 overs)

West Indies won by 5 wickets
Feroz Shah Kotla Ground, Delhi
Umpires: Dara Dotiwala (Ind) and V. K. Ramaswamy (Ind)

- India won the toss and elected to bat.
- Sanjay Manjrekar, Arshad Ayub (both Ind) and Winston Benjamin (WI) made their Test debuts.

=== 2nd Test ===
11–16 December 1987
Scorecard

India	v	West Indies
281 (67.4 overs); Krishnamachari Srikkanth 71 (63); Courtney Walsh 5/54 (17.4 overs)		337 (103.3 overs); Richie Richardson 89 (186); Ravi Shastri 4/71 (28.3 overs)
173 (46 overs); Krishnamachari Srikkanth 65 (78); Patrick Patterson 5/68 (16 overs)		4/1 (2 overs); Gordon Greenidge 2 (4); Chetan Sharma 1/1 (1 over)

Match drawn
Wankhede Stadium, Mumbai
Umpires: Ram Gupta (Ind) and Piloo Reporter (Ind)

- India won the toss and elected to bat.
- No play on day 2
- Carl Hooper (WI) made his Test debut.

=== 3rd Test ===
26–31 December 1987
Scorecard

West Indies	v	India
530/5d (151.5 overs); Gordon Greenidge 141 (265); Kapil Dev 2/103 (28 overs)		565 (172.2 overs); Dileep Vengsarkar 102retired hurt (266); Courtney Walsh 4/136 (29 overs)
157/2 (62 overs); Gordon Greenidge 69 (159); Ravi Shastri 2/13 (10 overs)

Match Drawn
Eden Gardens, Kolkata
Umpires: Ram Gupta (Ind) and Piloo Reporter (Ind)

- West Indies won the toss and elected to bat.

=== 4th Test ===
11–15 January 1988
Scorecard

India	v	West Indies
382 (104.1 overs); Kapil Dev 109 (124); Winston Davis 4/76 (18.1 overs)		184 (73.3 overs); Viv Richards 68 (102); Narendra Hirwani 8/61 (18.3 overs)
217/8d (76 overs); Woorkeri Raman 83 (205); Courtney Walsh 4/55 (16 overs)		160 (41.2 overs); Gus Logie 67 (62); Narendra Hirwani 8/75 (15.2 overs)

India won by 255 runs
MA Chidambaram Stadium, Chennai
Umpires: Ram Gupta (Ind) and Piloo Reporter (Ind)

- India won the toss and elected to bat.
- Narendra Hirwani, Woorkeri Raman, Ajay Sharma (all Ind) and Phil Simmons (WI) all made their Test debuts.

== ODIs ==
The West Indies won the Charminar Challenge Cup 6–1.

=== 1st ODI ===
8 December 1987
Scorecard

West Indies; 203/8 (50 overs)	v	India; 193 (44.4 overs)
CL Hooper 57* (84); Maninder Singh 3/40 (8 overs)		Kapil Dev 87 (64); BP Patterson 6/29 (9.4 overs)

West Indies won by 10 runs
Vidarbha Cricket Association Ground, Nagpur
Umpires: R Mehra and V Vikramraju
Player of the match: BP Patterson (WIN)

- West Indies won the toss and elected to bat.
- Arshad Ayub (IND) made his ODI debut.

=== 2nd ODI ===
23 December 1987
Scorecard

West Indies; 187/7 (45 overs)	v	India; 135 (41.3 overs)
IVA RIchards 41 (52); RJ Shastri 3/30 (9 overs)		M Amarnath 33 (70); CA Walsh 4/16 (7.3 overs)

West Indies won by 52 runs
Nehru Stadium, Guwahati
Umpires: SK Ghosh and RV Ramani
Player of the match: IVA RIchards (WIN)

- India won the toss and elected to field.

=== 3rd ODI ===
2 January 1988
Scorecard

India; 222/7 (45 overs)	v	West Indies; 166 (41.5 overs)
M Amarnath 70 (83); IVA Richards 2/48 (9 overs)		CG Greenidge 44 (70); Maninder Singh 2/19 (9 overs)

India won by 56 runs
Eden Gardens, Calcutta
Umpires: RB Gupta and PD Reporter
Player of the match: M Amarnath (IND)

- India won the toss and elected to bat.
- The match was reduced to 45 overs per side.
- WV Raman, AK Sharma and SK Sharma (all IND) made their ODI debuts.

=== 4th ODI ===
5 January 1988
Scorecard

India; 221/9 (43 overs)	v	West Indies; 225/4 (40.1 overs)
WV Raman 95 (123); IVA Richards 3/42 (8 overs)		IVA Richards 110* (77); Kapil Dev 1/22 (8 overs)

West Indies won by 6 wickets
Municipal Stadium, Rajkot
Umpires: DN Dotiwalla and SB Kulkarni
Player of the match: IVA Richards (WIN)

- India won the toss and elected to bat.
- The match was reduced before play started from 50 overs to 46 overs per side.
- The match was reduced to 43 overs per side.
- SV Manjrekar (IND) and D Williams (WIN) made their ODI debuts.

=== Indian Board Benevolent Fund Match ===
Scheduling issues and disagreement between the two Boards led to this match not counting as part of the Charminar Challenge Cup. The West Indians refused to allow the match to be counted as part of the Cup. The proceeds of the match went to the Cricketers’ Benevolent Fund.

7 January 1988
Scorecard

West Indies; 196 (48.3 overs)	v	India; 194/9 (50 overs)
CL Hooper 33 (69); Kapil Dev 2/21 (8.3 overs)		K Srikkanth 53 (71); BP Patterson 3/26 (9 overs)

West Indies won by 2 runs
Gujarat Stadium, Ahmedabad
Umpires: PG Pandit and RV Ramani
Player of the match: K Srikkanth (IND)

- India won the toss and elected to field.

=== 5th ODI ===
19 January 1988
Scorecard

India; 230/6 (50 overs)	v	West Indies; 231/6 (49.1 overs)
M Amarnath 100* (148); WKM Benjamin 2/38 (10 overs)		PV Simmons 67 (96); K Srikkanth 3/25 (6 overs)

West Indies won by 4 wickets
Nahar Singh Stadium, Faridabad
Umpires: SK Ghosh and VK Ramaswamy
Player of the match: M Amarnath (IND)

- West Indies won the toss and elected to field.

=== 6th ODI ===
22 January 1988
Scorecard

West Indies; 278/8 (50 overs)	v	India; 205 (41 overs)
CL Hooper 113* (97); Arshad Ayub 2/36 (9 overs)		RJ Shastri 73* (72); BP Patterson 4/29 (8 overs)

West Indies won by 73 runs
Captain Roop Singh Stadium, Gwalior
Umpires: DN Dotiwalla and SB Kulkarni
Player of the match: CL Hooper (WIN)

- India won the toss and elected to field.
- ND Hirwani (IND) made his ODI debut.

=== 7th ODI ===
25 January 1988
Scorecard

India; 239/8 (45 overs)	v	West Indies; 241/1 (42.5 overs)
K Srikkanth 101 (106); BP Patterson 3/34 (9 overs)		PV Simmons 104* (129); Maninder Singh 1/42 (9 overs)

West Indies won by 9 wickets
University Stadium, Trivandrum
Umpires: PG Pandit and V Vikramraju
Player of the match: PV Simmons (WIN)

- West Indies won the toss and elected to field.
- The match was reduced before play started from 50 overs to 45 overs per side.
