= Sri Lankan cricket team in India in 1986–87 =

International cricket tour

Sri Lanka's tour of India in 1986-87
	India	Sri Lanka
- Dates: 17 December 1986 – 17 January 1987
Captains	Kapil Dev	Duleep Mendis

Test series
- Result: India won the 3-match series 2–0
Most runs	Dilip Vengsarkar 376 most runs	Ravi Ratnayeke 206
Most wickets	Maninder Singh 18 most wickets	Ravi Ratnayeke 9
- Player of the series: Dilip Vengsarkar (Ind)

One Day International series
- Results: India won the 5-match series 4–1
Most runs	Sunil Gavaskar 202 most runs	Asanka Gurusinha 173
Most wickets	Raju Kulkarni and Kapil Dev 6	Arjuna Ranatunga 8 most wickets
- Player of the series: Sunil Gavaskar (Ind)

Sri Lanka's cricket tour of India in the 1986–87 season comprised a three-match Test series and a five-match ODI series. India won the Test series 2–0 as well as the ODI series 4–1

== Test series ==
=== 1st Test ===
17-22 December 1986
scorecard

Sri Lanka	v	India
420 (138 overs); Ravi Ratnayeke 93; Bharat Arun 3/76 (27 overs)		676/7 (167.1 overs); Mohammad Azharuddin 199; Ravi Ratnayeke 4/132 (37.1 overs)

Match drawn
Green Park Stadium
Umpires: Ram Gupta (Ind) and V.K. Ramaswamy (Ind)
Player of the match: Sunil Gavaskar (Ind)

- Sri Lanka won the toss and chose to bat
- Bharat Arun, Raman Lamba (Ind) and Graeme Labrooy (SL) all made their test debuts

=== 2nd Test ===
27-31 December 1986
scorecard

Sri Lanka	v	India
204 (59.1 overs); Arjuna Ranatunga 59 (77); Shivlal Yadav 5/76 (19.1 overs)		451/6 dec (129.5 overs); Dilip Vengsarkar 153; Asanka Gurusinha 2/25 (1.5 overs)
141 (48.1 overs); Ravi Ratnayeke 54; Maninder Singh 7/71 (17.4 overs)

India won by an innings and 106 runs
Vidarbha Cricket Association Ground Nagpur
Umpires: Rajan Mehra (Ind) and Piloo Reporter (Ind)
Player of the match: Dilip Vengsarkar (Ind) and Maninder Singh (Ind)

- Sri Lanka won the toss and chose to bat

=== 3rd Test ===
4-7 January 1987
scorecard

India	v	Sri Lanka
400 (127.3 overs); Dilip Vengsarkar 166 (279); Ravi Ratnayeke 5/85 (27.3 overs)		191 (76.1 overs); Roy Dias 49; Maninder Singh 4/41 (17.1 overs)
		142 (59 overs); Duleep Mendis 27; Ravi Shastri 4/11 (11 overs)

India won by an innings and 67 runs
Barabati Stadium Cuttack
Umpires: Ram Gupta (Ind) and V.K. Ramaswamy (Ind)
Player of the match: Kapil Dev (Ind)

- India won the toss and chose to bat

== One Day Internationals (ODIs) ==
India won the series 4–1.

=== 1st ODI ===
24 December 1986
Scorecard

Sri Lanka; 195/8 (46 overs)	v	India; 78 (24.1 overs)
AP Gurusinha 35 (58); Maninder Singh 3/24 (10 overs)		K Srikkanth 17 (42); A Ranatunga 4/14 (6 overs)

Sri Lanka won by 117 runs
Modi Park, Kanpur
Umpires: DN Dotiwalla and SR Phookan
Player of the match: A Ranatunga (SL)

- India won the toss and elected to field.
- The match was reduced to 46 overs per side.
- B Arun (IND) and EAR de Silva (SL) made their ODI debuts.

=== 2nd ODI ===
11 January 1987
Scorecard

Sri Lanka; 145/8 (46 overs)	v	India; 146/2 (27.3 overs)
LRD Mendis 31 (48); NS Yadav 2/18 (9 overs)		SM Gavaskar 70* (83); RJ Ratnayake 1/26 (6 overs)

India won by 8 wickets
Nehru Stadium, Guwahati
Umpires: RB Gupta and PG Pandit
Player of the match: SM Gavaskar (IND)

- India won the toss and elected to field.
- The match was reduced to 46 overs per side.

=== 3rd ODI ===
13 January 1987
Scorecard

Sri Lanka; 208/6 (44 overs)	v	India; 209/4 (41.3 overs)
AP Gurusinha 54 (64); RR Kulkarni 3/42 (10 overs)		R Lamba 57* (56); A Ranatunga 2/42 (10 overs)

India won by 6 wickets
Feroz Shah Kotla Ground, Delhi
Umpires: SK Ghosh and RR Kadam
Player of the match: A Ranatunga (SL)

- India won the toss and elected to field.
- The match was reduced to 44 overs per side.

=== 4th ODI ===
15 January 1987
Scorecard

India; 235/8 (43 overs)	v	Sri Lanka; 141 (36.3 overs)
SM Gavaskar 69 (94); GF Labrooy 5/57 (10 overs)		AP Gurusinha 26 (62); RJ Shastri 3/24 (5 overs)

India won by 94 runs
Moti Bagh Stadium, Vadodara
Umpires: PG Pandit and SR Ramchandra Rao
Player of the match: SM Gavaskar (IND)

- Sri Lanka won the toss and elected to field.
- The match was reduced to 43 overs per side.

=== 5th ODI ===
17 January 1987
Scorecard

India; 299/4 (40 overs)	v	Sri Lanka; 289/7 (40 overs)
M Azharuddin 108* (94); A Ranatunga 2/59 (10 overs)		RS Mahanama 98 (91); RR Kulkarni 2/57 (9 overs)

India won by 10 runs
Wankhede Stadium, Bombay
Umpires: DN Dotiwalla and RR Kadam
Player of the match: RS Mahanama (SL)

- Sri Lanka won the toss and elected to field.
- The match was reduced to 40 overs per side.
- Mohammad Azharuddin (Ind) scored his first century in ODIs.
