= Nehru Cup (cricket) =

International cricket tournament

1989 MRF World Series (Nehru Cup)
- Dates: 15 October – 1 November 1989
- Administrator: Board of Control for Cricket in India
- Cricket format: One Day International
- Tournament format(s): Round-robin and Knockout
- Host: India
- Champions: Pakistan
- Runners-up: West Indies
- Participants: 6
- Matches: 18
- Player of the series: (Pakistan) Imran Khan
- Most runs: (Cricket West Indies) Desmond Haynes (366)
- Most wickets: (Cricket West Indies) Winston Benjamin (13)

The MRF World Series for the Jawaharlal Nehru Cup was an international cricket tournament held in India to celebrate the birth centenary of Jawaharlal Nehru, first Prime Minister of India.

The tournament took place in October and November 1989, and was sponsored by the Madras Rubber Factory (MRF). Six teams took part: India (the host team), Australia, England, Pakistan, Sri Lanka, and the West Indies. The tournament was a round robin with each team playing all other teams once.

== Group stage ==
Team	Pts	Pld	W	L	R/R
India	12	5	3	2	4.63
England	12	5	3	2	4.52
Pakistan	12	5	3	2	4.30
West Indies	12	5	3	2	4.13
Australia	8	5	2	3	4.36
Sri Lanka	4	5	1	4	4.05

15 October 1989
Scorecard

Sri Lanka; 193 (48.3 overs)	v	England; 196/5 (48.4 overs)
PA de Silva 80 (89); PAJ DeFreitas 3/38 (10 overs)		RA Smith 81* (119); KIW Wijegunawardene 2/37 (8.4 overs)

England won by 5 wickets
Feroz Shah Kotla Ground, Delhi
Umpires: RB Gupta (IND) and PJ McConnell (AUS)
Player of the match: RA Smith (ENG)

- England won the toss and elected to field.
- ARC Fraser and AJ Stewart (both ENG) made their ODI debuts.

19 October 1989
Scorecard

Australia; 242/3 (50 overs)	v	England; 243/3 (47.3 overs)
AR Border 84* (44); ARC Fraser 1/48 (10 overs)		W Larkins 124 (126); AR Border 1/43 (10 overs)

England won by 7 wickets
Lal Bahadur Shastri Stadium, Hyderabad
Umpires: LH Barker (WI) and Khizer Hayat (PAK)
Player of the match: W Larkins (ENG)

- Australia won the toss and elected to bat.

19 October 1989
Scorecard

West Indies; 176/9 (50 overs)	v	Sri Lanka; 180/6 (47.1 overs)
AL Logie 54* (73); KIW Wijegunawardene 2/30 (10 overs); EAR de Silva 2/30 (10 overs)		AP Gurusinha 66 (90); WKM Benjamin 3/22 (9 overs)

Sri Lanka won by 4 wickets
Municipal Stadium, Rajkot
Umpires: PJ McConnell (AUS) and PD Reporter (IND)
Player of the match: AP Gurusinha (SL)

- Sri Lanka won the toss and elected to field.

21 October 1989
Scorecard

Australia; 241/6 (50 overs)	v	West Indies; 142 (40.3 overs)
GR Marsh 74 (129); WKM Benjamin 3/38 (9 overs)		RB Richardson 61 (101); AR Border 3/20 (10 overs)

Australia won by 99 runs
M. A. Chidambaram Stadium, Madras
Umpires: SK Ghosh (IND) and JW Holder (ENG)
Player of the match: AR Border (AUS)

- Australia won the toss and elected to bat.

22 October 1989
Scorecard

Pakistan; 148/9 (50 overs)	v	England; 149/6 (43.2 overs)
Saleem Malik 42 (59); GA Gooch 3/19 (10 overs)		AJ Lamb 42 (62); Wasim Akram 2/32 (10 overs)

England won by 4 wickets
Barabati Stadium, Cuttack
Umpires: RB Gupta (IND) and VK Ramaswamy (IND)
Player of the match: GA Gooch (ENG)

- Pakistan won the toss and elected to bat.

22 October 1989
Scorecard

India; 227/8 (50 overs)	v	Sri Lanka; 221 (49.4 overs)
NS Sidhu 80 (88); JR Ratnayeke 3/35 (10 overs)		AP Gurusinha 83 (106); Kapil Dev 3/26 (8.4 overs)

India won by 6 runs
Gujarat Stadium, Ahmedabad
Umpires: Khizer Hayat (PAK) and PJ McConnell (AUS)
Player of the match: NS Sidhu (IND)

- India won the toss and elected to bat.

23 October 1989
Scorecard

Pakistan; 205/8 (50 overs)	v	Australia; 139 (43.2 overs)
Shoaib Mohammad 73 (121); TM Alderman 4/22 (10 overs)		DM Jones 58 (94); Imran Khan 3/13 (8 overs)

Pakistan won by 66 runs
Brabourne Stadium, Bombay
Umpires: LH Barker (WI) and PD Reporter (IND)
Player of the match: Imran Khan (PAK)

- Australia won the toss and elected to field.
- Akram Raza (PAK) made his ODI debut.

23 October 1989
Scorecard

West Indies; 196/9 (45 overs)	v	India; 176 (41.4 overs)
RB Richardson 57 (110); C Sharma 3/46 (9 overs)		R Lamba 61 (80); IVA Richards 6/41 (9.4 overs)

West Indies won by 20 runs
Feroz Shah Kotla Ground, Delhi
Umpires: KT Francis (SL) and JW Holder (ENG)
Player of the match: IVA Richards (WI)

- India won the toss and elected to field.
- The match was reduced before play started from 50 overs to 46 overs per side.
- The match was reduced to 45 overs per side.

25 October 1989
Scorecard

Australia; 222/7 (50 overs)	v	Sri Lanka; 194 (47.1 overs)
DM Jones 85 (101); GF Labrooy 3/38 (10 overs)		PA de Silva 96 (107); SP O'Donnell 3/48 (10 overs)

Australia won by 28 runs
Nehru Stadium, Margao, Goa
Umpires: LH Barker (WI) and PD Reporter (IND)
Player of the match: PA de Silva (SL)

- Australia won the toss and elected to bat.
- TL Fernando (SL) made his ODI debut.

25 October 1989
Scorecard

England; 255/7 (50 overs)	v	India; 259/4 (48.1 overs)
AJ Lamb 91 (109); Kapil Dev 2/56 (10 overs)		C Sharma 101* (96); GC Small 1/44 (10 overs)

India won by 6 wickets
Modi Stadium, Kanpur
Umpires: KT Francis (SL) and Khizer Hayat (PAK)
Player of the match: C Sharma (IND)

- India won the toss and elected to field.

25 October 1989
Scorecard

Pakistan; 223/5 (50 overs)	v	West Indies; 226/4 (48.3 overs)
Aamer Malik 77 (106); CEL Ambrose 2/45 (10 overs)		RB Richardson 80 (116); Wasim Akram 2/38 (9.3 overs)

West Indies won by 6 wickets
Gandhi Stadium, Jalandhar
Umpires: JW Holder (ENG) and VK Ramaswamy (IND)
Player of the match: RB Richardson (WI)

- Pakistan won the toss and elected to bat.

27 October 1989
Scorecard

West Indies; 265/5 (50 overs)	v	England; 239/8 (50 overs)
DL Haynes 138* (164); GC Small 3/39 (10 overs)		RA Smith 65 (74); MD Marshall 4/33 (10 overs)

West Indies won by 26 runs
Captain Roop Singh Stadium, Gwalior
Umpires: SK Ghosh (IND) and VK Ramaswamy (IND)
Player of the match: DL Haynes (WI)

- West Indies won the toss and elected to bat.

27 October 1989
Scorecard

Australia; 247/8 (50 overs)	v	India; 249/7 (47.1 overs)
DM Jones 53 (77); AK Sharma 3/41 (10 overs)		K Srikkanth 58 (65); GRJ Matthews 3/56 (10 overs)

India won by 3 wickets
M. Chinnaswamy Stadium, Bangalore
Umpires: LH Barker (WI) and Khizer Hayat (PAK)
Player of the match: AK Sharma (IND)

- Australia won the toss and elected to bat.

27 October 1989
Scorecard

Pakistan; 219/6 (50 overs)	v	Sri Lanka; 213 (49.2 overs)
Imran Khan 84* (110); PA de Silva 2/43 (10 overs)		PA de Silva 83 (90); Wasim Akram 2/30 (10 overs)

Pakistan won by 6 runs
K. D. Singh Babu Stadium, Lucknow
Umpires: RB Gupta (IND) and PJ McConnell (AUS)
Player of the match: Imran Khan (PAK)

- Pakistan won the toss and elected to bat.

28 October 1989
Scorecard

Pakistan; 279/7 (50 overs)	v	India; 202 (42.3 overs)
Rameez Raja 77 (90); Arshad Ayub 2/31 (7 overs)		K Srikkanth 65 (75); Mushtaq Ahmed 3/51 (10 overs)

Pakistan won by 77 runs
Eden Gardens, Calcutta
Umpires: KT Francis (SL) and JW Holder (ENG)
Player of the match: Imran Khan (PAK)

- India won the toss and elected to field.

== Semi finals ==
=== 1st Semi Final ===
Pakistan beat England in the first semi-final. The match was reduced to 30 overs a side.

30 October 1989
Scorecard

England; 194/7 (30 overs)	v	Pakistan; 195/4 (28.3 overs)
RA Smith 55 (57); Abdul Qadir 3/30 (6 overs)		Rameez Raja 85* (82); PAJ DeFreitas 2/40 (6 overs)

Pakistan won by 6 wickets
Vidarbha Cricket Association Ground, Nagpur
Umpires: RB Gupta (IND) and VK Ramaswamy (IND)
Player of the match: Rameez Raja (PAK)

- Pakistan won the toss and elected to field.
- The match was reduced before play started to 30 overs per side.
- N Hussain (ENG) made his ODI debut.

=== 2nd Semi Final ===
30 October 1989
Scorecard

India; 165 (48.5 overs)	v	West Indies; 166/2 (42.1 overs)
M Azharuddin 38 (56); CA Walsh 3/39 (10 overs)		DL Haynes 64 (100); Kapil Dev 2/31 (8 overs)

West Indies won by 8 wickets
Wankhede Stadium, Bombay
Umpires: JW Holder (ENG) and PJ McConnell (AUS)
Player of the match: IVA Richards (WI)

- India won the toss and elected to bat.

== Final ==
1 November 1989
Scorecard

West Indies; 273/5 (50 overs)	v	Pakistan; 277/6 (49.5 overs)
DL Haynes 107* (137); Imran Khan 3/47 (9 overs)		Saleem Malik 71 (62); WKM Benjamin 2/71 (10 overs)

Pakistan won by 4 wickets
Eden Gardens, Calcutta
Umpires: SK Ghosh (IND) and PD Reporter (IND)
Player of the match: Imran Khan (PAK)

- West Indies won the toss and elected to bat.
- This was Imran Khan's last ODI in India.

At the final at Eden Gardens, Calcutta, Desmond Haynes scored 107 as West Indies totalled 273–5. But Pakistan overhauled it, scoring 277–6, thanks to Wasim Akram's six in the last over and half centuries from Saleem Malik and captain Imran Khan who was also Man of the Series.
