= 1984–85 Ranji Trophy =

1984-85 Ranji Trophy
- The Ranji Trophy, which the winners get.
- Administrator: BCCI
- Cricket format: First-class cricket
- Tournament format(s): League and knockout
- Champions: Bombay (30th title)
- Participants: 24
- Most runs: Ghulam Parkar (Bombay) (660)
- Most wickets: Rajinder Goel (Haryana) (39)

The 1984–85 Ranji Trophy was the 51st season of the Ranji Trophy. The season was preceded by celebrations on the completion of fifty years and a one-day series by Australia. Mumbai won their 30th title defeating Delhi in the final considered one of the best in the history of Ranji Trophy. During the tournament, Ravi Shastri batting for Mumbai against Baroda, scored a double-century in 113 minutes, a record that would stand for more than thirty years.

== Group stage ==
=== South Zone ===
Team	Pld	W	L	D	T	NR	Pts	Q
Karnataka	4	3	0	1	0	0	91	2.027
Tamil Nadu	4	2	1	1	0	0	78	1.464
Hyderabad	4	1	0	3	0	0	57	1.779
Andhra	4	1	3	0	0	0	52	0.602
Kerala	4	0	3	1	0	0	24	0.361

=== West Zone ===
Team	Pld	W	L	D	T	NR	Pts	Q
Bombay	4	1	0	3	0	0	74	2.053
Saurashtra	4	0	1	3	0	0	49	0.841
Maharashtra	4	0	0	4	0	0	45	1.106
Baroda	4	0	0	4	0	0	39	0.716
Gujarat	4	0	0	4	0	0	37	0.775

=== Central Zone ===
Team	Pld	W	L	D	T	NR	Pts	Q
Uttar Pradesh	4	3	0	1	0	0	90	1.990
Railways	4	1	1	2	0	0	47	0.661
Madhya Pradesh	4	0	1	3	0	0	39	1.051
Vidarbha	4	0	2	2	0	0	39	0.706
Rajasthan	4	0	0	4	0	0	29	1.021

=== North Zone ===
Team	Pld	W	L	D	T	NR	Pts	Q
Delhi	4	2	0	2	0	0	76	2.167
Haryana	4	2	0	2	0	0	68	1.285
Punjab	4	1	0	3	0	0	50	1.259
Services	4	1	2	1	0	0	44	0.880
Jammu and Kashmir	4	0	4	0	0	0	17	0.333

=== East Zone ===
Team	Pld	W	L	D	T	NR	Pts	Q
Orissa	3	1	0	2	0	0	48	1.651
Bihar	3	1	0	2	0	0	46	1.136
Bengal	3	0	0	3	0	0	25	1.146
Assam	3	0	2	1	0	0	14	0.453

== Knockout stage ==
Pre-Quarter-finals
22 Feb 1985 — Delhi
Railways	213& 168/2
Haryana	341 & 335/9d
22 Feb 1985 — Agra
Uttar Pradesh	157 & 176
Saurashtra	176 & 102

Quarter-finals
7 Mar 1985 — Faridabad
Haryana	223 & 148
Bombay	195 & 177/2
7 Mar 1985 — Madras
Tamil Nadu	362 & 197/0
Bihar	297 & 261
7 Mar 1985 — Bangalore
Karnataka	489 & 261/1d
Orissa	276 & 231
7 Mar 1985 — Delhi
Delhi	404
Uttar Pradesh	124 & 179

Semi-finals
23 Mar 1985 — Bombay
Bombay	548
Tamil Nadu	409 & 276/8d
23 Mar 1985 — Bangalore
Karnataka	189 & 307/8
Delhi	376

Finals
1 Apr 1985 — Bombay
Bombay	333 & 364/7d
Delhi	398 & 209

=== Final ===
1–6 April 1985
Scorecard

Bombay (H)	v	Delhi
333 (102.5 overs); Sunil Gavaskar 106; Madan Lal 4/42		398 (138 overs); Ajay Sharma 131; Raju Kulkarni 5/106
364/7 decl (91.3 overs); Ravi Shastri 76; Maninder Singh 4/132		209 (85.5 overs); Bhaskar Pillai 60; Ravi Shastri 8/91

Bombay won on by 90 runs
Wankhede Stadium, Bombay
Umpires: Bhairab Ganguli, V. K. Ramaswamy

- Bombay won the toss and decided to bat

== Scorecards and averages ==
- CricketArchive
