= List of international cricket five-wicket hauls by Courtney Walsh =

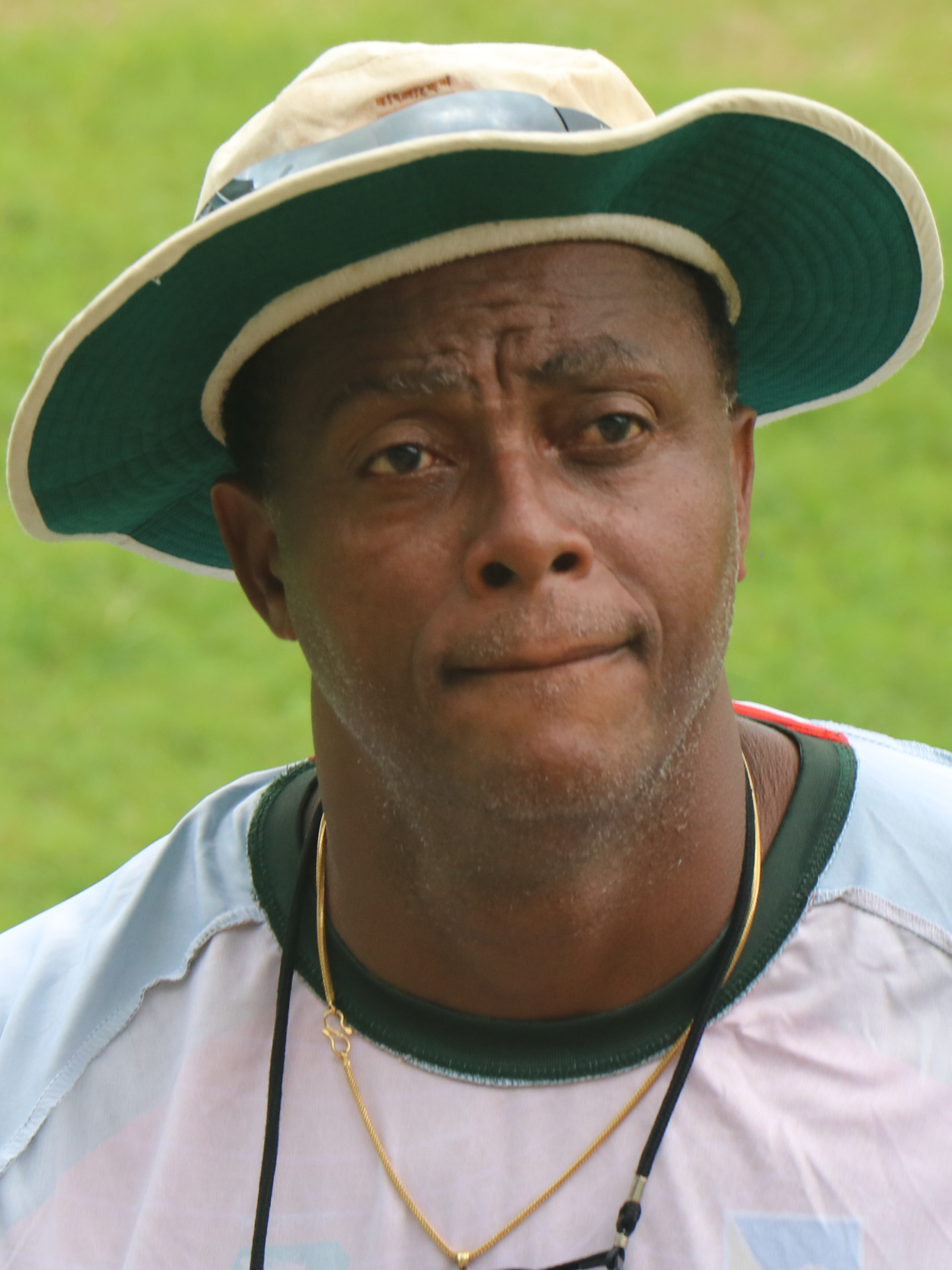
Former West Indian captain, Courtney Walsh

In cricket, a five-wicket haul (also known as a "five–for" or "fifer") refers to a bowler taking five or more wickets in a single innings. This is regarded as a notable achievement, and as of October 2024, only 54 bowlers have taken 15 or more five-wicket hauls at international level in their cricketing careers. Courtney Walsh, a former cricketer, who represented the West Indies cricket team from 1984 to 2001, took 23 five-wicket hauls in international cricket. He played 132 Tests and 205 One Day Internationals (ODIs), and took 519 and 227 wickets respectively. A right-arm fast bowler, Walsh took 22 five-wicket hauls in Tests and 1 in ODIs. In 1987, when he was named one of the Wisden Cricketers of the Year, the cricket almanack Wisden noted his "three distinct speeds, all delivered with the same action", and his "sparing use of the bouncer, his shorter deliveries generally threatening the batsman's rib-cage, a tactic which, allied to change of pace, produced many catches in the short-leg area off splice or glove." He was inducted into the ICC Cricket Hall of Fame in October 2010.

Walsh made his Test debut in November 1984 against Australia at the WACA Ground, Perth, a match West Indies won by an innings and 112 runs. His first Test five-wicket haul came in 1987 against New Zealand at the Eden Park, Auckland; the match was won by West Indies by 10 wickets. His career-best bowling figures for an innings were 7 wickets for 37 runs against the same team at the Basin Reserve, Wellington, in February 1995. He took another 6 wickets in the next innings, accumulating 13 wickets for 55 runs in the match—his solitary pair of five-wicket hauls. West Indies won the match by an innings and 322 runs, and his performance earned him a man of the match award. Walsh took more five-wicket hauls against England than any other nation: five. He took ten or more wickets in a match on three occasions.

Walsh made his ODI debut during the 1984–85 World Series Cup against Sri Lanka at the Tasmania Cricket Association Ground, Hobart. His solitary ODI five-wicket haul came against the same team in December 1986, a match which West Indies won at the Sharjah Cricket Association Stadium, Sharjah by 193 runs. He took five wickets conceding one run in the match. Cricinfo declared that it was the "cheapest" five-wicket haul in the history of international cricket. As of 2014, he is sixteenth among all-time combined five-wicket haul takers.

== Key ==
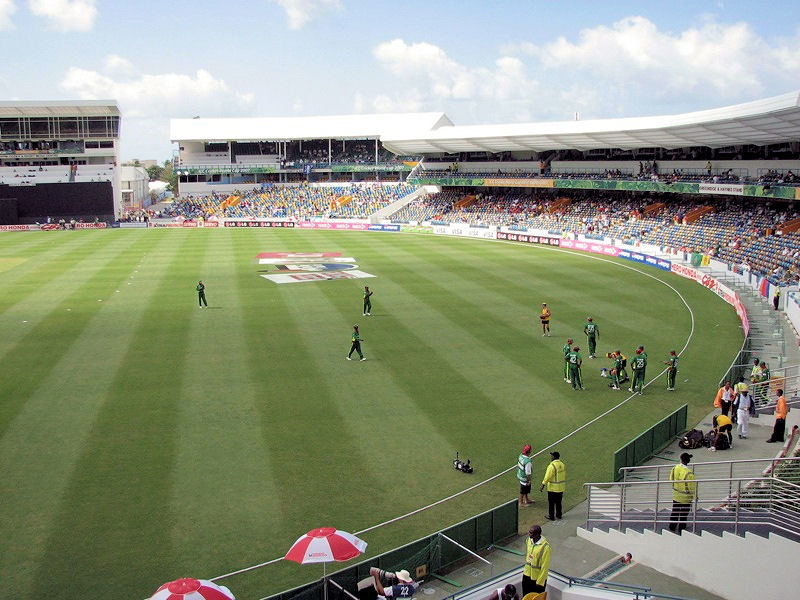
The Kensington Oval in Bridgetown, where Walsh took three of his five-wicket hauls

Symbol	Meaning
Date	Date the match was held, or starting date of the match for Test matches
Inn	The innings of the match in which the five-wicket haul was taken
Overs	Number of overs bowled in that innings
Runs	Runs conceded
Wkts	Number of wickets taken
Batsmen	The batsmen whose wickets were taken in the five-wicket haul
Econ	Bowling economy rate (average runs per over)
Result	The result for the West Indies team in that match
*	One of two five-wicket hauls by Walsh in a match
†	Walsh selected as "Man of the match"
‡	10 wickets or more taken in the match
§	Captained the West Indies cricket team

== Tests ==
Five-wicket hauls in Test cricket by Courtney Walsh
No.	Date	Ground	Against	Inn	Overs	Runs	Wkts	Econ	Batsmen	Result
1	27 February 1987	Eden Park, Auckland	New Zealand	3	30.2	73	5	2.40	John Wright; Jeff Crowe; Richard Hadlee; Ian Smith; Stephen Boock	Won
2	25 November 1987	Feroz Shah Kotla Ground, Delhi	India	3	29.3	54	5	1.83	Arun Lal; Dilip Vengsarkar; Kiran More; Arshad Ayub; Chetan Sharma	Won
3	11 December 1987	Wankhede Stadium, Bombay (Note: Bombay has since been renamed as Mumbai.)	India	1	17.4	54	5	3.05	Krishnamachari Srikkanth; Arun Lal; Mohinder Amarnath; Arshad Ayub; Maninder Singh	Drawn
4	28 April 1989	Sabina Park, Kingston	India	1	29	62	6	2.13	Navjot Singh Sidhu; Mohammad Azharuddin; Sanjay Manjrekar; Kiran More; Kapil Dev; Arshad Ayub	Won
5	24 February 1990	Sabina Park, Kingston	England	2	27.2	68	5	2.48	Wayne Larkins; Allan Lamb; David Capel; Jack Russell; Devon Malcolm	Lost
6	8 April 1994	Kensington Oval, Bridgetown	England	3	28	94	5	3.35	Michael Atherton; Alec Stewart; Mark Ramprakash; Graeme Hick; Graham Thorpe	Lost
7	18 November 1994	Wankhede Stadium, Bombay	India	1	22	79	6	3.59	Manoj Prabhakar; Navjot Singh Sidhu; Vinod Kambli; Sachin Tendulkar; Anil Kumble; Venkatapathy Raju	Lost
8	10 February 1995*†‡	Basin Reserve, Wellington	New Zealand	2	20.4	37	7	1.79	Bryan Young; Andrew Jones; Stephen Fleming; Shane Thomson; Adam Parore; Murphy Su'a; Simon Doull	Won
9	10 February 1995*†‡	Basin Reserve, Wellington	New Zealand	3	15.2	18	6	1.17	Bryan Young; Darrin Murray; Stephen Fleming; Murphy Su'a; Simon Doull; Danny Morrison	Won
10	8 April 1995†	Antigua Recreation Ground, St John's	Australia	1	21.3	54	6	2.51	Michael Slater; David Boon; Mark Waugh; Brendon Julian; Shane Warne; Glenn McGrath	Drawn
11	25 March 1995	Edgbaston, Birmingham	England	3	15	45	5	3.00	Michael Atherton; Dominic Cork; Peter Martin; Jason Gallian; Darren Gough	Won
12	29 November 1995§	Sydney Cricket Ground, Sydney	Australia	1	30	98	5	3.26	Ricky Ponting; Mark Waugh; Greg Blewett; Ian Healy; Michael Kasprowicz	Lost
13	1 February 1997§	WACA Ground, Perth	Australia	3	20	74	5	3.70	Mark Waugh; Steve Waugh; Michael Bevan; Ian Healy; Paul Reiffel	Won
14	17 November 1997§	Arbab Niaz Stadium, Peshawar	Pakistan	2	32	78	5	2.43	Aamer Sohail; Mohammad Wasim; Azhar Mahmood; Shahid Nazir; Mushtaq Ahmed	Lost
15	29 November 1997§	Rawalpindi Cricket Stadium, Rawalpindi	Pakistan	2	43.1	143	5	3.31	Aamer Sohail; Inzamam-ul-Haq; Mohammad Wasim; Waqar Younis; Shoaib Akhtar	Lost
16	15 January 1999	Centurion Park, Centurion	South Africa	1	24.5	80	6	3.22	Gary Kirsten; Herschelle Gibbs; Shaun Pollock; Mark Boucher; Lance Klusener; Paul Adams	Lost
17	26 March 1999	Kensington Oval, Bridgetown	Australia	3	17.1	39	5	2.27	Matthew Elliott; Mark Waugh; Ricky Ponting; Shane Warne; Stuart MacGill	Won
18	18 May 2000	Kensington Oval, Bridgetown	Pakistan	1	13	22	5	1.69	Mohammad Wasim; Younis Khan; Yousuf Youhana (Note: Mohammad Yousuf, after his conversion to Islam); Moin Khan; Waqar Younis	Drawn
19	25 May 2000	Antigua Recreation Ground, St. John's	Pakistan	1	26	83	5	3.19	Inzamam-ul-Haq; Abdul Razzaq; Saqlain Mushtaq; Waqar Younis; Mushtaq Ahmed	Won
20	15 June 2000†	Edgbaston, Birmingham	England	1	21	36	5	1.71	Michael Atherton; Mark Ramprakash; Graeme Hick; Andrew Flintoff; Robert Croft	Won
21	29 June 2000†‡	Lord's Cricket Ground, London	England	4	23.5	74	6	3.10	Michael Atherton; Mark Ramprakash; Michael Vaughan; Graeme Hick; Alec Stewart; Craig White	Lost
22	17 March 2001	Queen's Park Oval, Port of Spain	South Africa	3	36.4	61	6	1.66	Herschelle Gibbs; Gary Kirsten; Jacques Kallis; Nicky Boje; Shaun Pollock; Allan Donald	Lost

== One Day Internationals ==
Five-wicket hauls in ODI cricket by Courtney Walsh
No.	Date	Ground	Against	Inn	Overs	Runs	Wkts	Econ	Batsmen	Result
1	3 December 1986†	Sharjah Cricket Association Stadium, Sharjah	Sri Lanka	2	4.3	1	5	0.22	Duleep Mendis; Ashantha de Mel; Ravi Ratnayeke; Rumesh Ratnayake; Graeme Labrooy	Won
