= Gautam Shome =

Gautam Shome may refer to:

- Gautam Shome Sr. (Gautam Kumar Shome, born 1960), Indian cricketer
- Gautam Shome Jr. (born 1963), Indian cricketer
