= Tied Test =

Score equality in the longest international cricket matches

A tied Test is a Test cricket match in which the side batting second is bowled out in the fourth innings, with scores level. This is a very rare result; only two ties have occurred, as of December 2024, in the 2,573 Tests played since 1877. The first was in 1960 and the second in 1986. On both occasions, the aggregate scores of both sides (teams) were equal at the conclusion of play and the side batting last had completed its final innings: 10 batsmen had been dismissed or, from the perspective of the side bowling, 10 wickets had been taken. In other words, after four completed innings, with each innings ending either by a declaration or 10 wickets having fallen, the runs for both teams were exactly the same.

In cricket, a tie is distinct from a draw, a much more common result in Tests, which occurs when play concludes without victory by either team (except where a Test has been formally abandoned).

Both tied Tests involved Australia. Both ended in the last possible over of play on the last day with a ball to spare, meaning that within the space of several minutes all four normal Test match results were possible: a win for the batting side, a win for the fielding side, a draw or a tie. Bob Simpson is the only person to be involved in both tied tests – as a player for Australia in the first, and as the Australian team coach in the second.

== First tied Test, 1960 ==
9–14 December 1960
scorecard

West Indies	v	Australia
453 (100.5 overs); Garfield Sobers 132; Alan Davidson 5/135 (30 overs)		505 (130.3 overs); Norm O'Neill 181; Wes Hall 4/140 (29.3 overs)
284 (92.6 overs); Frank Worrell 65; Alan Davidson 6/87 (24.6 overs)		232 (68.7 overs); Alan Davidson 80; Wes Hall 5/63 (17.7 overs)

Match tied
The Gabba, Brisbane, Australia
Umpires: Colin Egar and Col Hoy

- West Indies won the toss and elected to bat.
- 8 balls per over.

The first tied Test was played between the West Indies and Australia. The match was played at The Gabba, in Brisbane, Queensland, Australia, between 9 and 14 December 1960.

=== West Indies 1st innings ===
After a poor start of 65/3, Garfield Sobers made a rapid 132 in 174 minutes. Alan Davidson took 5/135. West Indies were all out for 453 runs.

=== Australia 1st innings ===
Norm O'Neill made 181 in 401 minutes. Australia were all out for 505, a lead of 52.

=== West Indies 2nd innings ===
Alan Davidson took 6/87 and West Indies made 284, setting Australia a target of 233 runs to win.

=== Australia 2nd innings ===
Davidson and captain Richie Benaud set an Australian 7th-wicket partnership record of 134 in matches against the West Indies.

==== Last over ====
Wes Hall was bowling, with the clock showing 5:56 p.m. Australia stood at 227/7, needing six runs to win from the 8-ball over (the standard for tests in Australia at the time) with three wickets in hand.

- 1st ball: Wally Grout, facing, was hit on the thigh. Benaud called him through for a single to take strike. Five runs were needed to win from seven balls.
- 2nd ball: Benaud attempted a hook shot but was caught behind by wicket-keeper Gerry Alexander. The score was 228/8.
- 3rd ball: The new batsman, Ian Meckiff, cut to mid-off. No run. Still five runs to win from five balls.
- 4th ball: The ball flew down leg-side without making contact with Meckiff's bat. Grout called him through for a bye. Alexander threw the ball to the bowler's end to try to run out Meckiff, but his throw missed and Meckiff made his ground. Four runs to win from four balls.
- 5th ball: Grout fended a bouncer to square leg, where Rohan Kanhai was ready to take the catch. Hall also attempted to take the catch in his follow-through, resulting in a fielding mix-up which allowed Meckiff and Grout take a single and the catch was not taken. Three runs to win from three balls.
- 6th ball: Meckiff swung desperately and sent the ball towards the mid-wicket boundary. The batsmen ran two runs as Conrad Hunte scooped the ball up just inside the fence. The batsmen attempted a third run for victory but Hunte's return was flat and true, straight into the gloves of Alexander, who whipped off the bails before Grout could get home. The scores of the teams were level. Australia were on 232/9, requiring one run to win with one wicket in hand and two balls remaining.
- 7th ball: The new batsman, Lindsay Kline, pushed the ball to square leg and set off for a single. Joe Solomon scooped up the ball and, with one stump to aim for from 12 metres out, threw the ball in and hit the stumps, running Meckiff out by a few inches.

Australia were all out for 232 and the match ended in the first tie in 84 years of Test cricket.

== Second tied Test, 1986 ==
18–22 September 1986
Scorecard

Australia	v	India
574/7d (170.5 overs); Dean Jones 210 (330); Shivlal Yadav 4/142 (49.5 overs)		397 (94.2 overs); Kapil Dev 119 (138); Greg Matthews 5/103 (28.2 overs)
170/5d (49 overs); David Boon 49 (92); Maninder Singh 3/60 (19 overs)		347 (86.5 overs); Sunil Gavaskar 90 (168); Ray Bright 5/94 (25 overs)

Match tied
M. A. Chidambaram Stadium, Madras, India
Umpires: Dara Dotiwalla and V. Vikramraju
Player of the match: Dean Jones (Aus) and Kapil Dev (Ind)

- Australia won the toss and elected to bat.
- 10 wickets in match: Greg Matthews 10/249

The second tied test was the first Test of a three Test series, played between Australia and India, at the M. A. Chidambaram Stadium, Chepauk, Madras, in India between 18 and 22 September 1986. The conditions were said to be extremely hot and humid.

=== Australia 1st innings ===
Australia declared at 574/7 early on the third day. Dean Jones made 210, which was then the highest score by an Australian side in a Test in India, having faced 330 balls and hit 27 fours and 2 sixes. He had to be treated in hospital after the completion of the innings for heat exhaustion. Australian coach Bob Simpson described it as "the greatest innings ever played for Australia". David Boon scored 122, and Australian captain, Allan Border, 106.

=== India 1st innings ===
India lost 7 wickets for 270 runs by the end of the third day, and were all out for 397, avoiding the follow-on by only 23 runs and trailing by 177. India captain Kapil Dev made 119 and Greg Matthews took 5/103 wearing a sweater to prove his toughness. Sunil Gavaskar became the first Test cricketer to make 100 consecutive Test appearances.

=== Australia 2nd innings ===
Australia declared at 170 for 5, their overnight score at the end of the fourth day, setting India a target of 348 to win.

=== India 2nd innings ===
Starting positively, India reached 204 for 2, when Gavaskar was third out for 90. India reached 291 for 5 when Chandrakant Pandit was out. A flurry of tail-end wickets fell to leave India on 344 for 9 by the last over.

==== Last over ====
Greg Matthews was bowling to Ravi Shastri, with India's last man Maninder Singh at the bowler's end. India needed four runs to win from the 6-ball over with only one wicket remaining.

- 1st ball: To Shastri: no run. Four runs required off five balls.
- 2nd ball: Shastri took two runs, retaining the strike. Two runs required off four balls.
- 3rd ball: Shastri pushed the ball to square leg for a single. The scores of the teams were level, with one run required for victory, but the Indian 11th man was now on strike.
- 4th ball: To Singh: no run. One run required off two balls.
- 5th ball: The ball hit Singh on his back leg and umpire Vikramraju called him out leg before wicket after a loud appeal.

India were all out for 347, Matthews having taken 5/146 (10/249 in the match) and Ray Bright 5/94, and the match was the second tie in Test cricket. Matthews' two 5W/Is and 10W/M would be the only test match in his career in which he achieved either feat. Dean Jones and Kapil Dev were jointly named man of the match.

== Draws with scores level ==
In addition to the two tied Tests, there have been two Tests which ended when time expired with the scores level in the fourth innings, but with the batting side still having wickets in hand. This results in a drawn match and not a tie.

=== 1st Test, Bulawayo, 18–22 December 1996, England tour of Zimbabwe ===
In the first such Test, England when chasing 205 to win, finished on 204/6. With three runs required for victory off the final ball, Nick Knight ran two but was run out attempting the third.

=== 3rd Test, Mumbai, 22–26 November 2011, West Indies tour of India ===
In the second such Test, India, chasing 243 to win, finished on 242/9. With two runs required off the final ball, Ravichandran Ashwin completed the first run and was run out attempting the second.

== Other almost tied Tests ==
=== 2nd Test, Melbourne, 1–7 January 1908, England (Marylebone Cricket Club) tour of Australia ===
This Test was very close to becoming the first ever tied Test. All four innings were marked by most of the batsman getting past double figures, but only Kenneth Hutchings went on to score a century. Australia posted 266 and 397 while England scored 382 and were left with a fourth innings chase of 282.

With Sydney Barnes and Arthur Fielder at the crease for the final wicket and the scores level, Barnes knocked the ball toward 19 year old Gerry Hazlitt at cover point. Barnes took off for a winning single only to realise Fielder had stayed at the non-strikers, with Fielder slow to leave his end, Hazlitt picked up the ball and perhaps in a panic at the chance being gifted to him Hazlitt threw the ball wildly past the wicketkeeper Sammy Carter, leaving the English batsmen to safely complete a 1 wicket victory instead of a dismissal for a tie.

Hazlitt had performed poorly with bat and ball in both games of the series and was dropped. He didn't play for Australia again until 1912, the last Tests Australia played until 1920. Hazlitt died aged 27 in 1915 from a heart condition.

=== 2nd Test, Wellington, 24–28 February 2023, England tour of New Zealand ===
With England on 256/9 and chasing 258 to win with their final pair of batsmen at the crease, New Zealand's Neil Wagner bowled a bouncer that flew high above James Anderson's head. The obvious call of a wide was missed by the umpires, and instead of the next delivery being made with the scores tied with the addition of 1 run for the wide, England were instead 1 run behind the tie score of 257. Wagner fired a ball down the leg side that Anderson glanced and was caught by keeper Tom Blundell.

England lost the match by 1 run and became the fourth side to lose a test match after enforcing the follow-on.

== See also ==
- List of tied first-class cricket matches
- List of tied One Day Internationals
- List of tied Twenty20 Internationals

== Further reading and viewing ==
=== Gabba tied test ===
- Fingleton, Jack (1961). The Greatest Test of All. London: Collins. OCLC 21247057.
- Bradman Museum Archive (footage authorised for use by for non-commercial gain). (December 1960). First Tied Test :: The Last Over (Video). Bradman Museum (YouTube channel).
- Ramsey, Andrew (9 December 2020). "The recollections of Test cricket's first ever tied game from its participants, now in their 80s and 90s, have hardly dimmed in the intervening 60 years". cricket.com.au. "[The tied test] rewrote the rules of engagement for rival Test teams who had rarely spent time in each other's company up until then, and ignited a surge of interest in the game that had become forgettably moribund in Australia following Bradman's retirement in 1948."
- "Behind the Lens: The Famous 'Tied Test' Photo". Australian Photography. 5 May 2015. "If nothing happens in the last two balls I will probably get the sack as I'm yet to take a photo."

=== Madras tied test ===
- Cardwell, Ronald (2019). The Tied Test in Madras: Cricket, Controversy and Crommo. West Pennant Hills, NSW: The Cricket Publishing Company.
- Sexton, Michael (2019). Border's Battlers: The furnace of Madras, the tied Test, a defining moment for Australian cricket. South Melbourne: Affirm Press. ISBN 9781925870527.
- Grant, Trevor (21 September 2021) [23 September 1986]. "From the Archives, 1986: Matthews the hero in second-ever tied Test match (Original headline: Hero Matthews ties 'lost' Test)". The Guardian. "Unlike the 1960 tie, the relations between the two teams were as bitter as any seen on the Test cricket field."
- Pye, Stephen (23 February 2017). "How Australia and India produced the second tied Test in cricket history". The Guardian / That 1980s Sports Blog. "The lack of interest in Test cricket was a major concern, especially in India."
- Bradman Museum Archive (footage authorised for use by for non-commercial gain). (10 July 2019). Interview by Mike Coward on Second Tied Test, 1986. With Allan Border and Dean Jones (Video). Bradman Museum (YouTube channel). "Border: Unfortunately it doesn't get the profile of the original tied test in Brisbane."
- Hoult, Nick; John, Emma (25 July 2005). "'You weak Victorian' - Dean Jones, Ravi Shastri, Greg Matthews and Bob Simpson look back on the tied Test of 1986". ESPNcricinfo. "Simpson: The real amazing performance was by Greg Matthews. He bowled unchanged for the whole day. He had a little stool on the boundary which he would sit on between overs."
- Smith, Martin (2016). "The career ended by the 1986 tied test". cricket.com.au. "But while the match made many a career, it also ended that of Indian umpire V. Vikramraju."
- "An all-time historic photograph". Madras Musings Vol. XXV No. 15, November 16-30, 2015, courtesy Between the Wickets Winter 2013. "All the photographers leave their vantage point near the end of a match to position themselves for the post-match presentation etc, however Mala had no need and so was the only photographer to have captured the scene. [edited]"

=== Draws with scores tied ===
- Hopps, David (26 November 2011) [23 December 1996]. "From the Vault: Zimbabwe v England - the first scores-tied drawn Test (Original headline: Wide boys anger England)". The Guardian. "Lloyd's irksome reference to 'getting 15 of them out' was that of a man who felt that England's spinners had been refused several valid claims for bat-and-pad catches."
- Smyth, Rob (26 November 2011). "India force thrilling last-ball draw with West Indies in Mumbai". The Observer. "At the end I thought I should take the safer option of defending out one ball and then attacking the last ball, but it didn't work out, Ashwin said"
- "What MS Dhoni told Ashwin he could have done differently in 'tied' 2011 Test". Wisden.com. 21 July 2020. "With two needed off the final delivery, Ashwin was run out, having hesitated to run for two, leaving the scores tied at the end of the match. It caused a huge uproar..."

=== Other almost tied Tests ===
- "Second Test Match". The Advertiser. South Australia. 8 January 1908. p. 8 – via National Library of Australia (Trove). "[Subheadings:] The sixth day. Fight for victory. An exciting contest. Englishmen bat pluckily. England wins. One wicket to spare."
- Ehantharajah, Vithushan (28 February 2023). "Neil Wagner strikes gold to uphold New Zealand and England's unspoken promise". ESPN.com. "A deep bond forged by this ludicrous sport culminated in one of the best days it has produced"
- Miller, Andrew (28 February 2023). "Ben Stokes: 'That last half-hour is everything that you wish for'". ESPN.com. "Even though we came out on the wrong side of it, you can't help but feel blessed that we've managed to be a part of that incredible game."
