= Kiran Mokashi =

Indian cricketer

Personal information
- Full name: Kiran Damodar Mokashi
- Born: 21 September 1956 (age 70); Bombay, Maharashtra, India
- Batting: Right-handed
- Bowling: Right-arm off break
- Role: Bowler

Domestic team information
- Years: Team
- 1980/81–1990/91: Bombay

Career statistics
Competition	FC
Matches	47
Runs scored	365
Batting average	17.38
100s/50s	0/2
Top score	80
Balls bowled	11,276
Wickets	146
Bowling average	35.21
5 wickets in innings	6
10 wickets in match	0
Best bowling	6/66
Catches/stumpings	22/–
- Source: ESPNcricinfo, 5 April 2016

Kiran Damodar Mokashi (born 21 September 1956) is an Indian former first-class cricketer who represented Bombay. After his playing career, he worked as a match referee and a selector for the Mumbai Cricket Association.

== Life and career ==
Born in Bombay, Mokashi played as a lower-order batsman and an off spin bowler. He made his first-class debut in the 1980–81 Ranji Trophy which Bombay went on to win. He was also part of the Bombay team that won the 1981–82 Irani Trophy and the 1984–85 Ranji Trophy. In 1986, in a match for Bombay against the touring Australian team, Mokashi took a five-wicket haul which included the scalp of Australian captain Allan Border. He represented West Zone in the following season. Mokashi finished his career with 146 first-class wickets from 47 matches, making his last first-class appearance in April 1991.

In 2004, Mokashi started to work as a match referee in domestic cricket matches. He was appointed as a member of the senior team selection committee of Mumbai Cricket Association (MCA) in 2009. He had previously worked as a member of the under-19 team selection panel and chairman of selectors of the under-17 team of MCA.
