= Gopal Sharma (cricketer) =

Indian cricketer (born 1960)

Personal information
- Born: 3 August 1960 (age 66); Kanpur, Uttar Pradesh, India
- Batting: Right-handed
- Bowling: Right-arm offbreak

International information
- National side: India
- Test debut (cap 170): 31 January 1985 v England
- Last Test: 23 November 1990 v Sri Lanka
- ODI debut (cap 55): 25 August 1985 v Sri Lanka
- Last ODI: 10 April 1987 v Pakistan

Domestic team information
- Years: Team
- 1978/79–1993/94: Uttar Pradesh

Career statistics
Competition	Test	ODI	FC	LA
Matches	5	11	104	44
Runs scored	11	11	2,309	157
Batting average	3.66	5.50	22.41	8.72
100s/50s	0/0	0/0	2/11	0/0
Top score	10*	7	101*	20
Balls bowled	1,307	486	24,773	2,247
Wickets	10	10	353	45
Bowling average	41.79	36.10	30.01	34.33
5 wickets in innings	0	0	23	1
10 wickets in match	0	0	6	0
Best bowling	4/88	3/29	9/59	5/42
Catches/stumpings	2/–	2/–	48/–	14/–
- Source: ESPNcricinfo, 4 February 2006

Gopal Sharma (born 3 August 1960) is a former Indian cricketer who played in five Test matches and 11 One Day Internationals from 1985 to 1990. He was an off-spinner but was overshadowed by the spinners of the day for a place in the international squad – Laxman Sivaramakrishnan, Maninder Singh, Arshad Ayub, Shivlal Yadav, Ravi Shastri and Narendra Hirwani.

He was the first person from Uttar Pradesh to represent India post-independence. He was a member of the India Selection Committee representing the Central Zone in 2004/05 season.
