= Shantanu Sugwekar =

Indian cricketer (born 1966)

Personal information
- Full name: Shantanu Sharad Sugwekar
- Born: 18 December 1966 (age 59); Pune, Maharashtra
- Batting: Right-handed
- Bowling: Right-arm off-break
- Role: Middle order batsman

Domestic team information
- Years: Team
- 1987–2001: Maharashtra

Career statistics
Competition	First-class	List A
Matches	85	46
Runs scored	6,563	1,319
Batting average	63.10	37.68
100s/50s	19/26	1/9
Top score	299*	110
Balls bowled	2,715	1,350
Wickets	18	25
Bowling average	66.61	40.04
5 wickets in innings	0	0
10 wickets in match	0	0
Best bowling	2/20	4/30
Catches/stumpings	45/–	14/–
- Source: CricketArchive, 6 December 2001

Shantanu Sharad Sugwekar (born 18 December 1966) is a former Indian first-class cricketer who played for his home state Maharashtra from 1987 to 2001. Despite his first-class average of 63.10, Sugwekar never appeared in a Test for India, thus making him the only non-international in the history of cricket to play at least 50 first-class innings and finish his career averaging over 60.

He was a middle order batsman and represented India's Under-19s team in their 1986/87 tour of Australia. In Indian first-class cricket during his first two seasons he amassed 903 runs at an average of 129. This included an innings of 299 not out in a Ranji Trophy match against Madhya Pradesh. Maharashtra's last batsman Anil Walhekar made 38 in a last wicket partnership of 102, but it was not enough to see his teammate through to a triple hundred. Sugwekar remains the only batsman to have 299 not out as his highest first-class score.

Sugwekar captained Maharashtra in three Ranji Trophy campaigns from 1995/96 to 1997/98 and also served as captain of West Zone on occasions during the early 1990s. His best first-class season in terms of runs scored was 1996/97 when he made 928 runs at 71.38. Also a handy off spinner, his 18 first-class wickets include Rahul Dravid and Raman Lamba.

Sugwekar spent one season as an overseas professional for Corstorphine Cricket Club in Edinburgh, Scotland in the late 1980s. He bowled medium pace and batted in the top order, scoring more than one century.
