= P. C. Prakash =

Indian former first-class cricketer (born 1961)

Personal information
- Full name: Pathmadai Chander Prakash
- Born: 19 September 1961 (age 65); Madras, Tamil Nadu, India
- Nickname: PC
- Batting: Right-handed
- Role: Batsman

Domestic team information
- Years: Team
- 1985/86–1989/90: Tamil Nadu

Career statistics
Competition	FC	List A
Matches	36	7
Runs scored	1,778	227
Batting average	39.51	45.40
100s/50s	3/10	0/2
Top score	125*	59*
Balls bowled	78	–
Wickets	0	–
Bowling average	–	–
5 wickets in innings	–	–
10 wickets in match	–	n/a
Best bowling	–	–
Catches/stumpings	11/–	3/–
- Source: ESPNcricinfo, 24 February 2016

Pathmadai Chander Prakash (born 19 September 1961) is an Indian former first-class cricketer who played for Tamil Nadu. He works as a coach after his playing career and is currently the Head Coach of Karaikudi Kaalai in the Tamil Nadu Premier League.

== Career ==
Prakash played as a right-handed middle-order batsman in 36 first-class matches, and represented Tamil Nadu, South Zone and India under-25s in a span of five seasons. He was the leading run-scorer for Tamil Nadu in his debut Ranji season in 1985/86, with 484 runs at an average of 69.14. He was part of the Tamil Nadu team that won the 1987–88 Ranji Trophy and subsequently toured Australia for the MG Kailis-Kemplast Trophy in 1988/89 and 1989/90. He appeared in first-class matches against touring Pakistani and New Zealand teams during his career. He also played for Board President's XI and Wills XI in List A matches.

After retirement, Prakash coached cricketers in his home state. He worked as Tamil Nadu under-15 coach in 2008 and 2009, before being appointed as the batting coach of Tamil Nadu senior team in 2010 for the Ranji Trophy. He became the head coach of Tamil Nadu under-19s in 2011 and started working at the Tamil Nadu Cricket Association (TNCA) Academy as batting consultant in 2012.

In 2014, Prakash took over as the secretary of Mambalam Mosquitos, a cricket team that plays in the TNCA first division league, after his father P. S. Chander retired from the position. Chander and his brother P. S. Shanker had founded the team in 1944.
