= Shrikant Jadhav =

Indian first-class cricketer (born 1960)

Personal information
- Full name: Shrikant Jayawantrao Jadhav
- Born: 15 March 1960 (age 66); Poona, Maharashtra, India
- Batting: Right-handed
- Bowling: Right-arm off break
- Role: All-rounder

Domestic team information
- Years: Team
- 1982/83–1993/94: Maharashtra

Career statistics
Competition	First-class	List A
Matches	53	10
Runs scored	1,988	123
Batting average	36.14	17.57
100s/50s	1/15	0/1
Top score	123*	60*
Balls bowled	9,977	414
Wickets	135	5
Bowling average	32.32	63.20
5 wickets in innings	8	0
10 wickets in match	0	0
Best bowling	6/96	2/49
Catches/stumpings	19/–	1/–
- Source: ESPNcricinfo, 18 June 2016

Shrikant Jayawantrao Jadhav (born 15 March 1960) is an Indian former first-class cricketer who played for Maharashtra. He became a selector for the Maharashtra Cricket Association and a match referee, after his playing career.

== Life and career ==
Jadhav played as an all-rounder who batted right-handed and bowled right-arm off break. He appeared in 53 first-class and 10 List A matches, in a career that lasted 12 seasons from 1982/83 to 1993/94. He also appeared for India Under-25s against the visiting Sri Lankan team in December 1986. He was a member of the Maharashtra team that finished runners-up at the 1992–93 Ranji Trophy and took a five-wicket haul in the final against Punjab. He also represented West Zone in the early-1990s.

After retirement, Jadhav worked as a selector for the Maharashtra Cricket Association in its senior team selection panel. He also officiated in domestic cricket matches as a match referee.
