= Ravi Thakkar =

Indian cricketer (born 1962)

Personal information
- Full name: Ravindra Champaklal Thakkar
- Born: 22 October 1962 (age 64); Bombay, Maharashtra, India
- Batting: Right-handed
- Bowling: Slow left-arm orthodox
- Role: Bowler

Domestic team information
- Years: Team
- 1981/82–1989/90: Bombay
- 1992/93–1993/94: Assam

Career statistics
Competition	FC	List A
Matches	45	5
Runs scored	459	34
Batting average	22.95	34.00
100s/50s	0/1	0/0
Top score	92	33
Balls bowled	9,883	228
Wickets	136	3
Bowling average	30.16	39.66
5 wickets in innings	7	0
10 wickets in match	1	n/a
Best bowling	8/102	1/17
Catches/stumpings	30/–	0/–
- Source: ESPNcricinfo, 5 April 2016

Ravindra Champaklal Thakkar (born 22 October 1962) is an Indian former first-class cricketer who represented Bombay and Assam. He later worked as a selector for the Mumbai Cricket Association.

== Life and career ==
Thakkar played as a slow left-arm orthodox bowler and made his first-class debut in the 1981–82 Ranji Trophy one day after his 19th birthday. He took 21 wickets in his debut season at an average under 20. In the first match of the 1982–83 Ranji Trophy against Maharashtra, he took his career-best figures of 8/102. He finished that season with 34 wickets at an average of 21.29 including 4 five-wicket hauls and a ten-wicket haul. He played for eight more seasons, but was rather ineffective with just one five-wicket haul to his name. He played the last two seasons of his career for Assam, and finished with 136 wickets from 45 first-class appearances.

Thakkar continued to be associated with cricket after his playing career. Along with Raju Shirke, he started an indoor cricket academy in Mulund. He has also worked as a member of the senior team and age-group selection committees of the Mumbai Cricket Association.
