= Woorkeri Raman =

Former Indian cricketer and coach (b.1965)

Personal information
- Full name: Woorkeri Venkat Raman
- Born: 23 May 1965 (age 61); Madras, Madras State, India
- Batting: Left-handed
- Bowling: Slow left-arm orthodox
- Role: Opening batsman

International information
- National side: India (1988–1997)
- Test debut (cap 181): 11 January 1988 v West Indies
- Last Test: 2 January 1997 v South Africa
- ODI debut (cap 63): 2 January 1988 v West Indies
- Last ODI: 14 December 1996 v South Africa

Domestic team information
- Years: Team
- 1983–1999: Tamil Nadu

Career statistics
Competition	Test	ODI	FC	LA
Matches	11	27	132	87
Runs scored	448	617	7,939	2,892
Batting average	24.88	23.73	45.62	35.26
100s/50s	0/4	1/3	19/36	4/18
Top score	96	114	313	117*
Balls bowled	348	162	6,460	707
Wickets	2	2	85	18
Bowling average	64.50	85.00	37.36	33.61
5 wickets in innings	0	0	4	0
10 wickets in match	0	0	1	0
Best bowling	1/7	1/23	6/29	2/12
Catches/stumpings	6/–	2/–	91/–	22/–
Medal record
Men's Cricket
Representing India
ACC Asia Cup
Winner	1990–91 India
- Source: ESPNcricinfo, 15 September 2010

Woorkeri Venkat Raman (born 23 May 1965) is a former Indian cricketer and former coach of the India women's national cricket team, having been appointed to the role in December 2018. Raman was replaced by Ramesh Powar in May 2021 as the national women's team coach. He played domestic cricket for Tamil Nadu, mainly as a left-handed batsman and a part-time left arm spinner. He was a part of the Indian squad which won the 1990–91 Asia Cup.

== Career ==
Raman made his Test debut in his home town Chennai against the West Indies in 1987–88, top scoring in the second innings with 83 and taking a wicket in the first over that he bowled in Test cricket. India were bowled to victory in that match by Narendra Hirwani, who took 16 wickets (8/61 and 8/75). Raman played in 10 further Tests for India, until 1997. He also played in 27 One Day Internationals in the same period. However, he was relatively unsuccessful on the international stage. His only international century, 114, came in an ODI where he marshalled a tricky chase and led India to victory against South Africa in the 1992–93 series. Between November 1988 to December 1992, India played 25 Tests, out of which only one test was played in India, this impacted many players' careers as there were not any 'A' tours in the outside conditions, Raman was one of those players.

Raman began his first-class career as a left-arm spinner but eventually turned into a batsman. He was a successful batsman in domestic cricket scoring three double centuries, including 313 against Goa, in the 1988–89 season of the Ranji Trophy. His run aggregate, 1,018, beat the record set by Rusi Modi in 1944–45. He retired from all forms of cricket in 1999 after being axed from TN Ranji Team.

He also had great success as the overseas professional with Scottish East League Division One outfit Kirkcaldy Cricket Club in the summer of 1989.

== Coaching career ==
After retirement, Raman took to a career in coaching. He was appointed Tamil Nadu coach in 2006. His contract was renewed after two years and was signed for another two seasons with the team. With the Cricket Association of Bengal too showing interest in signing him to coach their side, he chose to continue with Tamil Nadu. The side won the 2008–09 edition of the domestic one-day tournament. In July 2010, he was appointed the Bengal coach replacing Roger Binny. He was their fourth coach in four years. In 2013, he was named the assistant coach of Kings XI Punjab, ahead of the sixth season of the Indian Premier League (IPL). Later that year, he returned from Bengal to coach the Tamil Nadu side. The following year, he was appointed batting coach of the IPL side Kolkata Knight Riders. His side went on to win the title that season.

In 2015, Raman was appointed by the Board of Control for Cricket in India to the coaching panel as the batting coach at the National Cricket Academy in Bengaluru. In December 2018, he was appointed the head coach of the India women's national team.
