= M. G. Mukherjee =

Indian cricket umpire

Personal information
- Died: 28 February 2004

Umpiring information
- ODIs umpired: 1 (1986)
- Source: ESPNcricinfo, 26 May 2014

M. G. Mukherjee (date of birth unknown, died 28 February 2004) was an Indian cricket umpire. His international umpiring experience was confined to one ODI game, in 1986.

== See also ==
- List of One Day International cricket umpires
