= Bhaskar Pillai =

Indian cricketer (born 1963)

Personal information
- Full name: Krishnan Bhaskar Pillai
- Born: 27 February 1963 (age 63); Thiruvananthapuram, Kerala, India
- Batting: Right-handed
- Bowling: Right-arm off-break
- Role: Batsman

Domestic team information
- Years: Team
- 1982–1994: Delhi

Career statistics
Competition	FC	List A
Matches	95	37
Runs scored	5,443	926
Batting average	52.84	38.58
100s/50s	18/21	1/6
Top score	222*	104
Balls bowled	238	9
Wickets	2	0
Bowling average	68.50	–
5 wickets in innings	0	–
10 wickets in match	0	–
Best bowling	1/20	–
Catches/stumpings	100/1	9/–
- Source: CricketArchive, 15 August 2022

Krishnan Bhaskar Pillai (born 27 February 1963) is a former Indian cricketer who was a prolific run scorer for Delhi and North Zone.

A right-handed batsman, he had particular success between 1983 and 1989 in the Ranji Trophy where he averaged about 70. Although he never got to play international cricket for India, he was once a standby for India's tour of Sri Lanka in 1985. He also once represented the Rest of India to play against Bombay at Nagpur and he scored a century in the second innings. In September 2016, he was appointed as Delhi senior team coach.

In August 2018, he was appointed as the coach of Uttarakhand cricket team.

In 2023, Bahrain Cricket Federation (BCF) appoints K Bhaskar Pillai as head coach.
