= Indu Bhushan Roy =

Indian cricketer (born 1961)

Personal information
- Born: 5 November 1961 (age 65); Calcutta, India
- Source: ESPNcricinfo, 1 April 2016

Indu Bhushan Roy (born 5 November 1961) is an Indian former cricketer. He played 31 first-class matches for Bengal between 1987 and 1994.

== See also ==
- List of Bengal cricketers
