= Rizwan-uz-Zaman =

Pakistani cricketer (born 1961)

Personal information
- Full name: Rizwan-uz-Zaman Khan
- Born: 4 September 1961 (age 65); Karachi, Sind, Pakistan
- Batting: Right-handed
- Bowling: Legbreak googly
- Role: Batsman

International information
- National side: Pakistan (1981–1989)
- Test debut (cap 88): 13 November 1981 v Australia
- Last Test: 24 February 1989 v New Zealand
- ODI debut (cap 37): 21 November 1981 v West Indies
- Last ODI: 27 January 1987 v India

Domestic team information
- Years: Team
- 1976/77–1989/90: Karachi Whites
- 1978/79–1999/00: Pakistan International Airlines
- 1983/84-1991/92: Karachi Blues

Career statistics
| Competition | Test | ODI | FC | LA |
|---|---|---|---|---|
| Matches | 11 | 3 | 205 | 138 |
| Runs scored | 345 | 20 | 14,452 | 3,938 |
| Batting average | 19.16 | 6.66 | 43.53 | 28.74 |
| 100s/50s | 0/3 | 0/0 | 43/70 | 5/29 |
| Top score | 60 | 14 | 217* | 112 |
| Balls bowled | 132 | – | 4,989 | 969 |
| Wickets | 4 | – | 87 | 23 |
| Bowling average | 11.50 | – | 22.24 | 27.56 |
| 5 wickets in innings | 0 | – | 2 | 0 |
| 10 wickets in match | 0 | – | 1 | 0 |
| Best bowling | 3/26 | – | 5/16 | 3/17 |
| Catches/stumpings | 4/– | 2/– | 120/– | 37/– |
- Source: CricketArchive, 12 August 2012

Rizwan-uz-Zaman Khan (born 4 September 1961) is a former Pakistani cricketer who played in 11 Test matches and three One Day Internationals from 1981 to 1989.

In addition to his first-class cricket career with Pakistan International Airlines, Karachi Whites and Karachi Blues, Rizwan played as a professional with North Yorkshire and South Durham Cricket League club Normanby Hall in 1990.
