= Sagarmoy Sensharma =

Indian cricketer (born 1966)

Personal information
- Born: 8 May 1966 (age 60); Calcutta, India
- Batting: Left-handed
- Bowling: Left-arm medium
- Source: Cricinfo, 2 April 2016

Sagarmoy Sensharma (born 8 May 1966) is an Indian former cricketer. He played 47 first-class matches for Bengal between 1987 and 1997.
