= Devashish Mahanti =

Indian cricketer (born 1963)

Personal information
- Full name: Devashish Mahanti
- Born: 23 December 1963 (age 62); Cuttack, India
- Batting: Left-handed
- Bowling: Right-arm medium
- Source: ESPNcricinfo, 9 April 2016

Devashish Mahanti (born 23 December 1963) is an Indian former cricketer. He played first-class cricket for Delhi and Orissa between 1982 and 1990. He was a left-handed batsman and a right-arm medium pace bowler. His first-class cricket career began with his debut in 1982-83 representing Delhi against Bombay. He represented Delhi for a few years before moving back to Orissa. He continued to represent Orissa till 1989-90 when he decided to officially retire from cricket. He is one of the beneficiaries entitled to receive monthly gratis from the Board of Control for Cricket in India (BCCI).
