= Gautam Shome Jr. =

Indian cricketer (born 1963)

Personal information
- Born: 5 June 1963 (age 63); Calcutta, India
- Source: ESPNcricinfo, 2 April 2016

Gautam Shome (born 5 June 1963), known in his playing days as Gautam Shome Junior, is an Indian former cricketer. He played 29 first-class matches for Bengal between 1985 and 1998.

== See also ==
- List of Bengal cricketers
