= B. R. Keshavamurthy =

Cricket umpire

Personal information
- Full name: B. R. Keshavamurthy

Umpiring information
- ODIs umpired: 1 (1986)
- Source: ESPNcricinfo, 7 November 2015

B. R. Keshavamurthy is an Indian cricket umpire. At the international level, he only stood in a single One Day International, in 1986.

== See also ==
- List of One Day International cricket umpires
