= S. R. Ramchandra Rao =

Indian cricket umpire (1931–2017)

Personal information
- Born: 16 September 1931
- Died: 11 June 2017 (aged 85)

Umpiring information
- Tests umpired: 1 (1987)
- ODIs umpired: 3 (1983–1987)
- Source: Cricinfo, 14 June 2017

S. R. Ramchandra Rao (16 September 1931 – 11 June 2017) was an Indian cricket umpire. In his international umpiring career, he stood in one Test match in 1987 and three ODI games between 1983 and 1987.

== See also ==
- List of Test cricket umpires
- List of One Day International cricket umpires
