= Subrata Banerjee =

Indian cricket umpire (1945–2016)

Personal information
- Born: 3 May 1945
- Died: 19 August 2016 (aged 71)

Umpiring information
- ODIs umpired: 13 (1983–1998)
- WTests umpired: 1 (1995)
- Source: Cricinfo, 16 May 2014

Subrata Banerjee (3 May 1945 – 19 August 2016) was an Indian cricket umpire. Besides umpiring in domestic fixtures in India, he officiated in thirteen One Day International matches from 1983 to 1998. He died in Kolkata in 2016 at the age of 71.

== See also ==
- List of One Day International cricket umpires
