= Rajan Mehra =

Indian cricket umpire (1933–2010)

Personal information
- Born: 23 November 1933; Lahore, British India
- Died: 4 October 2010 (aged 76); Delhi, India

Umpiring information
- Tests umpired: 2 (1986–1987)
- ODIs umpired: 3 (1982–1987)
- WTests umpired: 1 (1984)
- Source: Cricinfo, 12 July 2013

Rajan Mehra (23 November 1933 – 4 October 2010) was an Indian cricket umpire. He stood in two Test matches in 1986 and 1987 and three ODI games between 1982 and 1987. Mehta played 14 first-class matches for Delhi in the 1950s.

== See also ==
- List of Test cricket umpires
- List of One Day International cricket umpires
