= V. K. Ramaswamy (umpire) =

Indian cricket umpire (born 1945)

Personal information
- Full name: Virinchirpuram Krishnamoorthi Ramaswamy
- Born: 26 April 1945 (age 81); Madras (now Chennai), India
- Batting: Right-handed
- Bowling: Right-arm off break
- Role: Umpire

Umpiring information
- Tests umpired: 26 (1985–1999)
- ODIs umpired: 44 (1983–2002)
- WTests umpired: 1 (1995)
- WODIs umpired: 2 (1978–1997)
- Source: Cricinfo profile, 30 May 2025

Virinchirpuram Krishnamoorthi Ramaswamy (born 26 April 1945) is a former Indian Test cricket umpire.

Ramaswamy was born in Madras and worked for Indian Railways. He umpired in Indian domestic first-class matches from the early 1970s, including the finals of the Ranji Trophy in 1984, 1985, 1986, 1994, and 1997 and the final of the Duleep Trophy in 1991, 1998 and 1999. In the 1991 Duleep Trophy final, between North Zone and West Zone, he was criticised by Indian Test cricketer Bishen Bedi for failing to defuse the tension between the sides which led to the game being abandoned after bowler Rashid Patel bowled a succession of bouncers and beamers at batsman Raman Lamba before seizing a stump and pursuing him to the third man boundary, with Lamba using his bat to fend off Patel's blows. Wisden described the incident as "the most shameful moment in the history of Indian cricket".

He umpired 26 Test matches between January 1985 to November 1999, and 43 ODIs between November 1983 and January 2002, mainly in India – only 7 of his Test matches were overseas.

He made his ODI debut as an umpire in the match between India and West Indies at Moti Bagh Stadium, Vadodara, on 9 November 1983. He umpired in the 1987 Cricket World Cup and in the 1996 Cricket World Cup in Sri Lanka and Pakistan, including the match on 29 February 1996 in which Kenya unexpectedly beat West Indies by 73 runs, described by Wisden as "One of the biggest upsets in cricket history."[ref] His last ODI was the second between Pakistan and New Zealand at Barabati Stadium, Cuttack on 22 January 2002.

He made his Test umpiring debut in January 1985, in the fourth Test between India and England at the MA Chidambaram Stadium, Madras, and was hailed by Wisden as a "top-class umpire". He stood regularly in Test matches in India until 1988, and also in the second and third Tests in Pakistan in November 1986 between Pakistan and West Indies. The first of these matches was the first to have two neutral umpires – Ramaswamy and fellow Indian umpire, Piloo Reporter – since English umpires presided over Triangular Tests between Australia and South Africa in 1912.

With Ram Babu Gupta, he umpired the 5th Test between India and Pakistan at Bangalore in March 1987 – Sunil Gavaskar's last Test match. Having reached 96 in the second innings, with the score at 180–7 chasing 221 to win, Ramaswamy gave Sunil Gavaskar out, caught at slip by Rizwan-uz-Zaman off the bowling of Iqbal Qasim. Pakistan quickly won the match by 16 runs. Gavaskar later remarked that the match may have turned out differently if veteran Indian umpire Swaroop Kishen had been standing.

After his 12th Test as umpire, the second Test between India and New Zealand at Wankhede Stadium, Bombay in November 1988, there was a hiatus of more than 4 years before he returned as umpire in the second Test between India and England in February 1993, in Madras. In 1994, he and Srinivasaraghavan Venkataraghavan were the two Indians on the first international panel of umpires, set up by the ICC to ensure that one neutral umpire would stand in every Test match (later supplemented by the Elite Panel of ICC Umpires). His final Test was the third Test between India and New Zealand at Sardar Patel Stadium, Ahmedabad, in October 1999.

== See also ==
- List of Test cricket umpires
- List of One Day International cricket umpires
