= R. S. Rathore =

Indian cricket umpire (born 1938)

Personal information
- Born: 21 September 1938 (age 88)

Umpiring information
- Tests umpired: 2 (1990–1993)
- ODIs umpired: 4 (1986–1991)
- Source: Cricinfo, 15 July 2013

Raghuvir Singh Rathore (born 21 September 1938) is a former Indian cricket umpire and a former first-class cricketer. He stood in two Test matches between 1990 and 1993 and four ODI games between 1986 and 1991. Rathore played a first-class match for Rajasthan, in the semi-final of the 1962–63 Ranji Trophy, against Delhi.

== See also ==
- List of Test cricket umpires
- List of One Day International cricket umpires
