= V. Vikramraju =

Indian cricket umpire (1934–2026)

Personal information
- Born: 1 January 1934
- Died: 7 June 2026 (aged 92); Bengaluru, Karnataka, India

Umpiring information
- Tests umpired: 2 (1985–1986)
- ODIs umpired: 5 (1984–1988)
- Source: Cricinfo, 16 July 2013

V. Vikramraju (1 January 1934 – 7 June 2026) was an Indian cricket umpire. He stood in two Test matches between 1985 and 1986, including the second tied Test, and five ODI games between 1984 and 1988. Vikramraju died on 7 June 2026, at the age of 92.

== See also ==
- List of Test cricket umpires
- List of One Day International cricket umpires
