= R. R. Kadam =

Indian cricket umpire

Personal information
- Full name: R. R. Kadam

Umpiring information
- ODIs umpired: 4 (1986–1987)
- Source: Cricinfo, 20 May 2014

R. R. Kadam is a former Indian cricket umpire. At the international level, he only officiated in four One Day Internationals, between 1986 and 1987.

== See also ==
- List of One Day International cricket umpires
