= R. V. Ramani =

Indian cricket umpire

Personal information
- Full name: R. V. Ramani

Umpiring information
- ODIs umpired: 13 (1983–1993)
- Source: Cricinfo, 27 May 2014

R. V. Ramani is a former Indian cricket umpire. He stood in thirteen ODI games from 1983 to 1993.

== See also ==
- List of One Day International cricket umpires
