= Arshad Ayub =

Indian cricketer (born 1958)

Personal information
- Born: 2 August 1958 (age 68); Hyderabad, Telangana, India
- Batting: Right-handed
- Bowling: Right-arm offbreak

International information
- National side: India
- Test debut (cap 178): 25 November 1987 v West Indies
- Last Test: 1 December 1989 v Pakistan
- ODI debut (cap 62): 8 December 1987 v West Indies
- Last ODI: 8 December 1990 v Sri Lanka

Career statistics
| Competition | Test | ODI |
|---|---|---|
| Matches | 13 | 32 |
| Runs scored | 257 | 116 |
| Batting average | 17.13 | 11.60 |
| 100s/50s | 0/1 | 0/0 |
| Top score | 57 | 31* |
| Balls bowled | 3663 | 1769 |
| Wickets | 41 | 31 |
| Bowling average | 35.07 | 39.22 |
| 5 wickets in innings | 3 | 1 |
| 10 wickets in match | 0 | 0 |
| Best bowling | 5/50 | 5/21 |
| Catches/stumpings | 2/– | 5/– |
Medal record
Men's Cricket
Representing India
ACC Asia Cup
| Winner | 1988 Bangladesh |
- Source: ESPNcricinfo, 4 February 2006

Arshad Ayub (born 2 August 1958) is a former Indian cricketer who played in 13 Test matches and 32 One Day Internationals from 1987 to 1997. In January 2010, he became the manager for the Indian cricket team for the series held in Bangladesh and for the world cup 2015 in Australia. He is the former president of the Hyderabad Cricket Association. He was a part of the Indian squad which won the 1988 Asia Cup.

Ayub was born in Hyderabad, Andhra Pradesh. He made his debut at Delhi against West Indies in 1987–88. As West Indies chased down 276 in the fourth innings Ayub had put up a lone battle, picking up four of the five West Indian wickets to fall.

== Arshad Ayub Cricket Academy ==
Arshad Ayub Cricket Academy [AACA] was formed in the year 1998 in the Masab Tank area of Hyderabad by Arshad Ayub himself. Since then the academy has contributed many players at all levels from under 14 to Ranji trophy. 2013 witnessed 20 players from the academy representing Hyderabad state teams right from under 14, under 16, under 19 under 22 and Ranji Trophy.

Arshad studied at All Saints High School, Hyderabad.
