= Sudhakar Kulkarni =

Indian cricket umpire (1937–2011)

Personal information
- Full name: Sudhakar Balkrishna Kulkarni
- Born: 16 June 1937
- Died: 30 May 2011 (aged 73)

Umpiring information
- Tests umpired: 1 (1990)
- ODIs umpired: 5 (1986–1988)
- Source: Cricinfo, 7 June 2019

Sudhakar Kulkarni (16 June 1937 – 30 May 2011) was an Indian cricket umpire. At the international level, he stood in one Test match, between India and Sri Lanka, in 1990, and five ODI games between 1986 and 1988.

== See also ==
- List of Test cricket umpires
- List of One Day International cricket umpires
