= Sunit Ghosh =

Indian cricket umpire (1934–2021)

Personal information
- Full name: Sunit Kumar Ghosh
- Born: 1 September 1934
- Died: 7 November 2021 (aged 87)
- Role: Umpire

Umpiring information
- Tests umpired: 2 (1988)
- ODIs umpired: 7 (1987–1989)
- WODIs umpired: 1 (1978)
- Source: Cricinfo, 6 July 2013

Sunit Ghosh (1 September 1934 – 7 November 2021) was an Indian cricket umpire. He officiated in nine international fixtures, including two Test matches in 1988 and seven ODI games between 1987 and 1989.

== See also ==
- List of Test cricket umpires
- List of One Day International cricket umpires
