= Dara Dotiwalla =

Indian cricket umpire (1933–2019)

Personal information
- Full name: Dara N Dotiwalla
- Born: 30 October 1933
- Died: 30 January 2019 (aged 85)

Umpiring information
- Tests umpired: 6 (1982–1987)
- ODIs umpired: 8 (1982–1988)
- Source: ESPNcricinfo, 5 July 2013

Dara Dotiwalla (30 October 1933 – 30 January 2019) was an Indian cricket umpire. Dotiwalla officiated in 14 international matches. He stood in six Test matches between 1982 and 1987, including only the second Tied Test ever tied, and eight One Day International games between 1982 and 1988. He died on 30 January 2019, aged 85.

== See also ==
- List of Test cricket umpires
- List of One Day International cricket umpires
