= Piloo Reporter =

Indian cricket umpire (1938–2023)

Personal information
- Full name: Piloo Dara Reporter
- Born: 24 September 1938; Bombay, Bombay Province, British India
- Died: 3 September 2023 (aged 84); Mumbai, India
- Nickname: PD

Umpiring information
- Tests umpired: 14 (1984–1993)
- ODIs umpired: 22 (1984–1994)
- Source: ESPNCricinfo, 23 March 2012

Piloo Dara Reporter (24 September 1938 – 3 September 2023) was an Indian international cricket umpire who umpired in 14 Test matches and 22 One Day Internationals in a career spanning three decades. He was among the first of the two neutral umpires, in modern cricket, when he officiated in a Test match between Pakistan and the West Indies in Lahore in 1986.

== Biography ==
Reporter was born in Bombay on 24 September 1938.

He started his career with the Maharashtra State Electricity Board. He responded to an advertisement by the then-Bombay Cricket Association calling for umpires. He failed the tests initially, but, later made it as an umpire with the association and started by officiating as an umpire in the domestic circuit. His first match as an umpire in a domestic Ranji Trophy match was at the age of 29. In 1984, he made his international umpiring debut in both Test matches and one day internationals (ODI), standing in 14 Tests and 22 ODI's until 1994. His first test match was in 1984 in Delhi, where he officiated the test between India and England, while his last test was also between the two teams, in Mumbai (then Bombay), in 1993.

In 1986, Reporter and V.K. Ramaswamy became the first neutral umpires from India when they stood in a Test match featuring Pakistan and West Indies in Lahore. This was the first time neutral umpires had officiated in a Test since 1912. They were invited by the Pakistan captain, Imran Khan after allegations of bias by Pakistani umpires. Reporter was the only Indian umpire to officiate in the 1992 Cricket World Cup that was held in Australia and New Zealand.

Reporter was from the Parsi community and was known as "PD" in the cricketing fraternity. The method by which Reporter signalled a boundary had been called "Milkshake" by cricket commentator Henry Blofeld. His autobiography, An Umpire Remembers, was published by Rupa & Company in 2004.

In 1993, Reporter was allegedly paid to give his assessment of the pitch prior to a test in Calcutta to bookie Mukesh Gupta.

== Personal life ==
Reporter was married and had two daughters. His sisters, Madhumati & Vaishali, were actresses and dancers in Bollywood movies.

== Death ==
Reporter died on 3 September 2023, at age 84. He had been diagnosed with a cerebral contusion earlier.

== Book ==
- Reporter, Piloo (2004). An Umpire Remembers: The Autobiography of Piloo Reporter. Rupa & Company. ISBN 978-81-291-0470-0.

== See also ==
- List of Test cricket umpires
- List of One Day International cricket umpires
