= Raman Lamba =

Indian cricketer

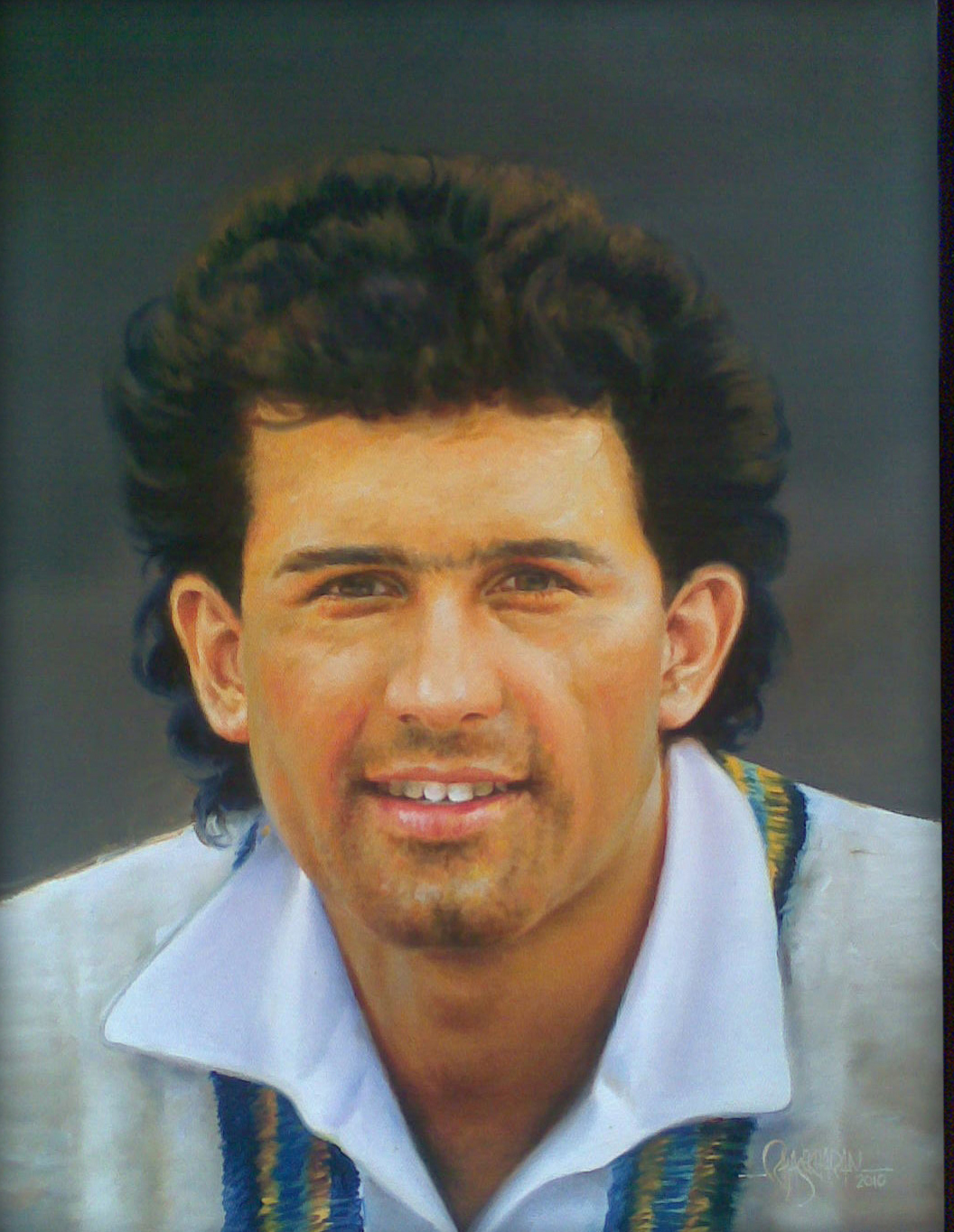
- Oil painting by Rajasekharan Parameswaran

Personal information
- Full name: Raman Lamba
- Born: 2 January 1960; Meerut, Uttar Pradesh, India
- Died: 23 February 1998 (aged 38); Dhaka, Bangladesh
- Batting: Right-handed
- Bowling: Right-arm medium
- Role: Batsman
- Relatives: Rakesh Lamba (brother)

International information
- National side: India
- Test debut (cap 177): 17 January 1987 v Sri Lanka
- Last Test: 25 November 1987 v West Indies
- ODI debut (cap 58): 7 October 1986 v Australia
- Last ODI: 22 December 1989 v Pakistan

Domestic team information
- Years: Team
- 1980–1998: Delhi
- 1980–1991: North Zone
- 1990: Ireland
- 1992–1998: Abahani

Career statistics
Competition	Test	ODI	FC
Matches	4	32	121
Runs scored	102	783	8,776
Batting average	20.40	27.00	53.86
100s/50s	0/1	1/6	31/27
Top score	53	102	320
Balls bowled	–	19	816
Wickets	–	1	6
Bowling average	–	20.00	70.50
5 wickets in innings	–	0	0
10 wickets in match	–	0	0
Best bowling	–	1/9	2/9
Catches/stumpings	5/–	10/–	60/–
- Source: CricketArchive, 12 September 2011

Raman Lamba (2 January 1960 – 23 February 1998) was an Indian cricketer. Raman had played in four Tests and 32 One Day Internationals, mainly as a batsman. He was a popular player in Bangladesh's Dhaka Premier League and also represented Ireland in unofficial One Day International matches. Lamba died after slipping into a coma, due to an internal haemorrhage, three days after being hit on the temporal bone by a cricket ball while fielding in Bangladesh's league cricket.

== Profile ==
Raman Lamba was born on 2 January 1960 in Meerut. He was a right-handed batsman who was noted for his fitness. He commenced his Ranji Trophy career in 1980-81 and continued until his death in the 1997–98 season. He scored 6,362 runs at an average of 53.91 in 87 matches, scoring 22 centuries including 5 double centuries and his career highest of 312 versus Himachal Pradesh at Delhi in 1994–95, which is not only his personal highest score but also among the highest individual scores for Delhi. In 1994-95 he aggregated 1,034 runs in 10 matches at an average of 73.86 with 3 centuries and 4 half-centuries, which was a record number of runs in a Ranji Trophy season. He led Delhi in 8 matches in the season 1994–95, winning 3 and drawing 5. His 320 in the Duleep Trophy for North Zone against West Zone in the final at Bhilai in 1986-87 still remains among the highest individual scores. In first-class cricket, he scored a total of 8,776 runs at 53.84 and his 175 innings including 31 centuries and 27 fifties.

Lamba's highest score 320* came in the Duleep Trophy Final in 1987-88 for North Zone v West Zone. The West might have felt very satisfied with their first innings score of 444, with their captain and Test opener Anshuman Gaekwad making 216. Their opponents, however, had other ideas and replied with 868 all out. Lamba left Gaekwad in the shade with 320 in 720 minutes which was scored off 471 balls including six 6s and thirty 4s. That season he totalled 1097 runs at 84.38. Seven years later he crossed the triple hundred mark again with 312 for Delhi in a Ranji Trophy match versus Himachal Pradesh at Delhi. The hosts ran up 637-3 declared owing much to a first wicket Indian record stand of 464 between Lamba and Ravi Sehgal, who made 216. Lamba's 312 came off 392 balls with two 6s and twenty five 4s and took 567 minutes. These innings and similar knocks, such as his 617-ball 250 for Delhi v Punjab in 1996/97 gained him a somewhat mixed reputation.

== International cricket ==
=== One-day cricket ===
Lamba appeared for India as a one-day player in the 1986 Australasia Cup final, when he also took a good catch under pressure to dismiss Abdul Qadir off Kapil Dev, where he played as substitute fielder. He had a great opening in One day cricket as he scored 64 in his first match and 102 in his sixth match as he won the man of the series against Australia for scoring 278 runs at an average of 55.60 per innings with a century and 2 fifties. His scoring pattern in 6 innings were 64, 1, 20*, 74, 17 and 102. Lamba and Krishnamachari Srikkanth were India's openers for the Jawaharlal Nehru Centenary Cup in 1989. Twice they had 100 runs opening partnership, against Australia and Pakistan. Their approach was similar, as both were stroke players. Their aggressive batting approach as openers was later adopted by opening pair Sanath Jayasuriya and Romesh Kaluwitharana in 1996 World Cup.

== Personal life ==
In 1987 Raman Lamba met his future wife, Irishwoman Kim Michelle Crothers and they were engaged for 3 years before getting married on 7, September 1990. Lamba started playing as an overseas professional cricketer in Ireland with Ulster from 1990. Raman and Kim have two children Jasmyn and Kamran. Kim settled down with both children in Portugal after Raman's demise.

== Death ==
Lamba died on 23 February 1998 in the Post Graduate Hospital in Dhaka in Bangladesh after he was hit on the temple by a cricket ball hit by Mehrab Hossain off left-arm spinner Saifullah Khan while fielding at forward short leg. It is said that Lamba was asked to wear a helmet, but he thought it was unnecessary because only three balls of the over were remaining when he was asked to move to that position. He was known by his teammates not to use a helmet while fielding close in. Lamba was playing for Dhaka's leading club, Abahani Krira Chakra, in the final of the Premier Division cricket match versus Mohammedan Sporting Club at the Dhaka Bangabandhu Stadium on 20 February 1998. The shot was so ferocious that the ball deflected from his head and flew into wicketkeeper Khaled Mashud's gloves. Mohammad Aminul Islam, the former Bangladesh captain, recalled "I was the new man in and asked Raman if he was okay. He said, 'Bulli (Islam's nickname is Bulbul) main to mar gaya' (I am dead, Bulli)". Although the injury did not appear to be particularly serious, Lamba suffered an internal haemorrhage and slipped into a coma. Although a neurosurgeon was flown in from Delhi, all efforts were in vain. After three days, his ventilator was removed and Lamba was declared dead.

There were tributes from all over the world when Lamba died. His wife, Kim, paid him a moving tribute when she put the cap of his local team, Sonnet Club, on Lamba.

== Trivia ==
- On his first tour abroad to England in 1986, he was involved in a rare incident when 12 fielders were on the field for one full over from Ravi Shastri in the second Test against England at Leeds, when as a substitute for K. Srikkanth, he remained on the field even though Srikkanth had already arrived on the field quietly, without requesting Raman Lamba to go back to the pavilion. The umpires were also unaware of Srikkanth's return to the field throughout the 6-ball over in which nothing untoward took place on the field.
- Just as Lamba could not play a Test on the tour of England in 1986, he missed a test on his next tour of Pakistan in 1989–90 due to a finger injury in the morning of the first test day.
- Lamba was involved in one more controversial incident. He had a wordy clash with West Zone cricketer Rashid Patel on the field of play during a Duleep Trophy match at Jamshedpur in 1990–91. The Board of Control for Cricket in India (BCCI) on 25 February 1991 banned Lamba till 31 December 1991 and Patel till 31 March 1992 from playing in any first-class cricket match as a punishment.
- 2019 Telugu film Jersey and its 2022 Hindi remake film of the same name are said to be somewhat loosely based on his life, yet these allegations have been addressed by Gowtam Tinnanuri as not true.

== See also ==
- List of fatal accidents in cricket
- List of unusual deaths in the 20th century
