= Ram Babu Gupta =

Indian cricket umpire (1935–2008)

Personal information
- Full name: Ram Babu Gupta
- Born: 17 July 1935; Delhi, India
- Died: 27 April 2008 (aged 72); London, England

Umpiring information
- Tests umpired: 11 (1986–1988)
- ODIs umpired: 24 (1985–1990)
- Source: Cricinfo, 6 July 2013

Ram Babu Gupta (17 July 1935 – 27 April 2008) was an Indian cricket umpire who officiated in nearly three dozen international matches. He stood in 11 Test matches between 1986 and 1988 and 24 ODI games between 1985 and 1990. In 1987 he became the first Indian to officiate in a Cricket World Cup final.

== See also ==
- List of Test cricket umpires
- List of One Day International cricket umpires
