= Maninder Singh (cricketer) =

Indian cricket player and cricket commentator

Personal information
- Born: 13 June 1965 (age 61); Pune, Maharashtra, India
- Batting: Right-handed
- Bowling: Slow left-arm orthodox

International information
- National side: India
- Test debut (cap 161): 23 December 1982 v Pakistan
- Last Test: 13 March 1993 v Zimbabwe
- ODI debut (cap 43): 21 January 1983 v Pakistan
- Last ODI: 5 March 1993 v England

Umpiring information
- WODIs umpired: 1 (1997)

Career statistics
Competition	Test	ODI
Matches	35	59
Runs scored	99	49
Batting average	3.80	12.25
100s/50s	0/0	0/0
Top score	15	8*
Balls bowled	8,218	3,133
Wickets	88	66
Bowling average	37.36	31.30
5 wickets in innings	3	0
10 wickets in match	2	0
Best bowling	7/27	4/22
Catches/stumpings	19/–	38/–
Medal record
Men's Cricket
Representing India
ACC Asia Cup
Winner	1988 Bangladesh
- Source: ESPNcricinfo, 4 February 2006

Maninder Singh (born 13 June 1965) is a former Indian cricket player and a cricket commentator. He represented India in 35 Test matches and 59 One Day Internationals. A slow left-arm orthodox spin, Maninder was considered the heir apparent to Bishan Singh Bedi, who then held the record as India's leading spinner in terms of wickets. Maninder retired prematurely for personal reasons. Singh holds the Test record for the most Tests in a complete career without aggregating 100 runs. He was a part of the Indian squad which won the 1988 Asia Cup.

== Education ==
He went to prestigious SGTB Khalsa College of Delhi University.

== Career ==
Maninder began his Test career playing against Pakistan in Karachi, in December 1982. His last match was against Zimbabwe in May 1993. He was regarded as heir apparent to Bedi, and at the height of his career, he was reputed to possess a huge variety in his arsenal. He is often credited with bowling an over where each of the six balls would be different from the previous one, juggling with flight, length and spin. His international career was however cut short due to a lot of internal team politics. He took 88 wickets in his 35 Tests, with a best of seven wickets for 27 runs. He took 66 wickets in One Day Internationals and a best of four wickets for 22 runs.

He is also remembered for his dismissal in the Madras Test, resulting in a tie against Australia in the 1986–87 series.

Though now retired from active cricket, Maninder is still in the scene as a cricket expert.

== Controversy ==
On 22 May 2007, Maninder was questioned by police for possession of cocaine and he confessed to using cocaine for himself. It is alleged that they found 1.5 grams of cocaine in his residence in East Delhi, sold to him by a Nigerian national the police had been following. Maninder though denied the charges vehemently. In 2012, he was acquitted of the charge.

In the early hours of 8 June 2007, Maninder was admitted to Shanti Mukund Hospital in Delhi with injuries to his wrists. His wife has issued a statement saying that it was "purely an accident" however local TV channels have speculated that it could be the result of a fake suicide attempt or even a domestic accident.
