= Batting average (cricket) =

Cricket statistic

In cricket, a player's batting average is the total number of runs they have scored divided by the number of times they have been out, usually given to two decimal places. Since the number of runs a player scores and how often they get out are primarily measures of their own playing ability, and largely independent of their teammates, batting average is a good metric for an individual player's skill as a batter (although the practice of drawing comparisons between players on this basis is not without criticism). The number is also simple to interpret intuitively. If all the batter's innings were completed (i.e. they were out every innings), this is the average number of runs they score per innings. If they did not complete all their innings (i.e. some innings they finished not out), this number is an estimate of the unknown average number of runs they score per innings.

Each player normally has several batting averages, with a different figure calculated for each type of match they play (first-class, one-day, Test matches, List A, T20, etc.), and a player's batting averages may be calculated for individual seasons or series, or at particular grounds, or against particular opponents, or across their whole career.

Batting average has been used to gauge cricket players' relative skills since the 18th century.

Batting averages are sometimes calculated for whole teams, across a series or tournament.

== Values ==
Most players have career batting averages in the range of 20 to 40. This is also the desirable range for wicket-keepers, though some fall short and make up for it with keeping skill. Until a substantial increase in scores in the 21st century due to improved bats and smaller grounds among other factors, players who sustained an average above 50 through a career were considered exceptional, and before the development of the heavy roller in the 1870s (which allowed for a flatter, safer cricket pitch) an average of 25 was considered very good.

- All-rounders who are more prominent bowlers than batsmen typically average something between 20 and 30.
- 15 and under is typical for specialist bowlers.
- A small number of players have averaged less than 5 for a complete career, though a player with such an average is a liability unless an exceptional bowler such as Alf Valentine, B. S. Chandrasekhar or Glenn McGrath were.

Career records for batting average are usually subject to a minimum qualification of 20 innings played or completed, in order to exclude batsmen who have not played enough games for their skill to be reliably assessed. Under this qualification, the highest Test batting average belongs to Australia's Sir Donald Bradman, with 99.94. Given that a career batting average over 50 is exceptional, and that only 4 other players have averages over 60, this is an outstanding statistic. The fact that Bradman's average is so far above that of any other cricketer has led several statisticians to argue that, statistically at least, he was the greatest athlete in any sport.

Disregarding this 20 innings qualification, the highest career Test batting average is 144 by Kurtis Patterson, who scored 144 runs and was dismissed once in his two Test innings. He then fell out of the Australian squad due to a loss of form and injury.

Batting averages in One Day International (ODI) and T20 International (T20I) cricket tend to be lower than in Test cricket because of the need to score runs more quickly. Consequently, batters tend to play riskier strokes and less emphasis is placed on building an innings in order to amass a high individual score. It should also be remembered, especially in relation to the ODI and T20I histograms above, that there were no ODI or T20I matches when Bradman played.

== Interpretation ==
If a batter has been dismissed in every single innings, then this statistic gives exactly the average number of runs they score per innings.

However, for a batter with one or more innings which finished not out, the true mean or average number of runs they score per innings is unknown as it is not known how many runs they would have scored if they could have completed all their not out innings. In this case, this statistic is an estimate of the average number of runs they score per innings. If their scores have a geometric distribution, then this statistic is the maximum likelihood estimate of their true unknown average.

Batting averages can be strongly affected by the number of not outs. For example, Phil Tufnell, who was noted for his poor batting, has an apparently respectable ODI average of 15 (from 20 games), despite a highest score of only 5 not out, as he scored an overall total of 15 runs from 10 innings, but was out only once.

A batter who was not dismissed in any of the innings over which their average is being calculated does not have a batting average, as division by zero does not give a result.

== Leading male batting averages ==
=== First-class ===
Highest career batting averages in first-class cricket as follows:

Rank	Batter	Matches	Innings	N.O.	Runs	Highest	Ave	First Class career
1	(Australia) Don Bradman	234	338	43	28,067	452*	95.14	1927–49
2	(India) Vijay Merchant	150	234	46	13,470	359*	71.64	1929–51
3	(Cricket West Indies) George Headley	103	164	22	9,921	344*	69.86	1927–54
4	(India) Ajay Sharma	129	166	16	10,120	259*	67.46	1984–2001
5	(Australia) Bill Ponsford	162	235	23	13,819	437	65.18	1920–34
6	(Australia) Bill Woodfull	174	245	39	13,388	284	64.99	1921–34
7	(India) **Sarfaraz Khan**	62	92	13	5,114	301*	64.73	2014–26
8	(India) Shantanu Sugwekar	85	122	18	6,563	299*	63.10	1987–2002
9	(Sri Lanka) **Kamindu Mendis**	59	91	8	5,166	200*	62.24	2018–25
10	(India) K. C. Ibrahim	60	89	12	4,716	250	61.24	1938–50
Qualification for inclusion: 50 innings. Names in **bold text** are current players whose figures are likely to change. * denotes not out. Source: ESPNcricinfo. Last updated: 1 February 2026

=== Test matches ===
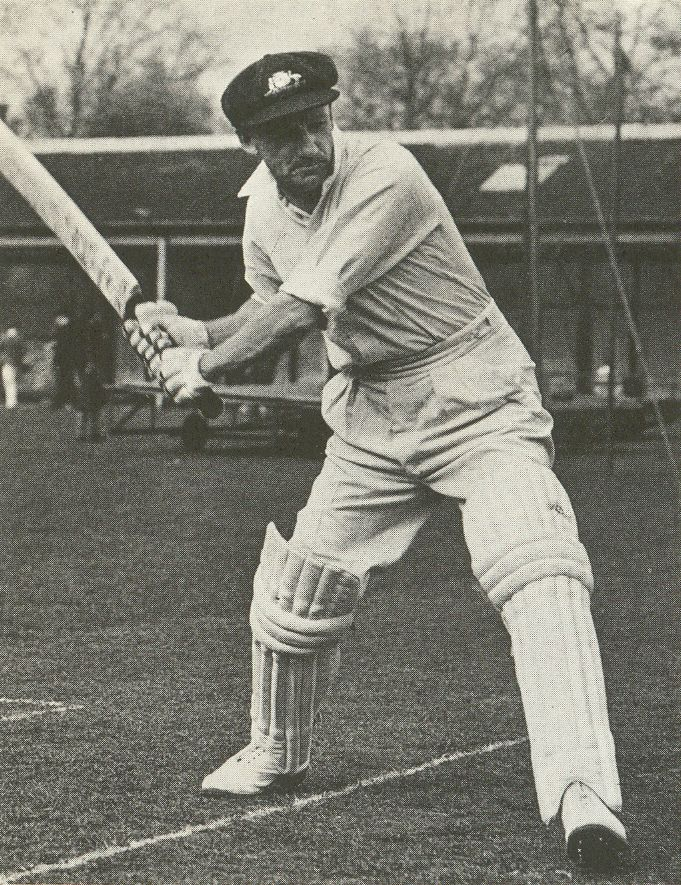
Don Bradman

A batting average of above 50 is considered by many as a benchmark to distinguish between a good and a great batsman. Highest male career batting averages in Test matches as follows:

Rank	Batter	Tests	Innings	N.O.	Runs	High Score	Average	Test career
1	(Australia) Don Bradman	52	80	10	6,996	334	99.94	1928–48
2	(Sri Lanka) **Kamindu Mendis**	14	24	3	1,316	182*	62.66	2022–25
3	(Australia) Adam Voges	20	31	7	1,485	269*	61.88	2015–16
4	(South Africa) Graeme Pollock	23	41	4	2,256	274	60.97	1963–70
5	(Cricket West Indies) George Headley	22	40	4	2,190	270*	60.83	1930–54
6	(England) Herbert Sutcliffe	54	84	9	4,555	194	60.73	1924–35
7	(England) Eddie Paynter	20	31	5	1,540	243	59.23	1931–39
8	(England) Ken Barrington	82	131	15	6,806	256	58.67	1955–68
9	(Cricket West Indies) Everton Weekes	48	81	5	4,455	207	58.61	1948–58
10	(England) Wally Hammond	85	140	16	7,249	336*	58.45	1927–47
Qualification for inclusion: 20 innings. Names in **bold text** are current players whose figures are likely to change. * denotes not out. Source: ESPNcricinfo. Last updated: 1 February 2026

=== One Day Internationals ===
Highest career batting averages in One Day International cricket as follows:

Rank	Batter	ODIs	Innings	N.O.	Runs	Highest	Ave	ODI career
1	(United States) **Milind Kumar**	22	22	6	1,016	155*	67.73	2024–25
2	(Netherlands) Ryan ten Doeschate	33	32	9	1541	119	67.00	2006–11
3	(India) **Virat Kohli**	311	299	47	14,797	183	58.71	2008–26
4	(New Zealand) **Daryl Mitchell**	59	54	8	2,690	137	58.47	2021–26
5	(England) Dawid Malan	30	30	4	1,450	140	55.76	2019–23
6	(India) **Shubman Gill**	61	61	8	2,953	208	55.71	2019–26
7	(Pakistan) **Babar Azam**	140	137	16	6,501	158	53.72	2015–25
8	(Australia) Michael Bevan	232	196	67	6,912	108*	53.58	1994–2004
9	(South Africa) AB de Villiers	228	218	39	9,577	176	53.50	2005–18
10	(Afghanistan) **Ibrahim Zadran**	39	39	3	1,869	177	51.91	2019–25
Qualification for inclusion: 20 innings. Names in **bold text** are current players whose figures are likely to change. * denotes not out. Source: ESPNcricinfo. Last updated: 1 February 2026

=== T20 Internationals ===
Rank	Batsmen	T20Is	Innings	N.O.	Runs	Highest	Ave	T20I career
1	(India) **Tilak Varma**	40	37	13	1,183	120*	49.29	2023–25
2	(India) Virat Kohli	125	117	31	4,188	122*	48.69	2010–24
3	(Austria) **Karanbir Singh**	41	40	4	1,721	115	47.80	2024–25
4	(Pakistan) **Mohammad Rizwan**	106	93	21	3,414	104*	47.41	2015–24
5	(Bahrain) **Sohail Ahmed**	67	62	27	1,659	80*	47.40	2022–25
6	(Spain) **Mohammad Ihsan**	24	24	6	845	160	46.94	2022–25
7	(Malawi) **Sami Sohail**	66	62	19	1,988	96*	46.23	2019–25
8	(India) **Rinku Singh**	40	28	14	641	69*	45.78	2023–26
9	(India) Manish Pandey	39	33	17	709	79*	44.31	2015–20
10	(Switzerland) **Faheem Nazir**	27	27	4	985	113	42.82	2022–25
Qualification for inclusion: 20 innings. Names in **bold text** are current players whose figures are likely to change. * denotes not out. Source: ESPNcricinfo. Last updated: 1 February 2026

== Leading female batting averages ==
=== Test matches ===
Rank	Batter	Tests	Innings	N.O.	Runs	High Score	Average	Test career
1	(Australia) Denise Annetts	10	13	3	819	193	81.90	1987–92
2	(India) **Shafali Verma**	5	10	1	567	205	63.00	2021–24
3	(Australia) Lorraine Hill	7	10	2	499	118*	62.37	1975–77
4	(England) Enid Bakewell	12	22	4	1,078	124	59.88	1968–79
5	(Australia) Belinda Haggett	10	15	2	762	144	58.61	1987–92
6	(Australia) **Ellyse Perry**	14	23	7	930	213*	58.12	2008–25
7	(Australia) Betty Wilson	11	16	1	862	127	57.46	1948–58
8	(India) **Smriti Mandhana**	7	12	1	629	149	57.18	2014–24
9	(Australia) Karen Rolton	14	22	4	1,002	209*	55.66	1995–2009
10	(New Zealand) Debbie Hockley	19	29	4	1,301	126*	52.04	1979–96
Qualification for inclusion: 10 innings. Names in **bold text** are current players whose figures are likely to change. * denotes not out. Source: ESPNcricinfo. Last updated: 2 February 2025

=== One Day Internationals ===
Rank	Batter	ODIs	Innings	N.O.	Runs	Highest	Ave.	ODI Career
1	(England) Rachael Heyhoe Flint	23	20	9	643	114	58.45	1973–82
2	(Australia) Lindsay Reeler	23	23	5	1,034	143*	57.44	1984–88
3	(Australia) Meg Lanning	103	102	16	4,602	152*	53.51	2011–23
4	(Australia) Bronwyn Calver	34	21	11	534	81*	53.40	1991–98
5	(South Africa) **Laura Wolvaardt**	122	121	16	5,477	184*	52.16	2016–25
6	(India) Mithali Raj	232	211	57	7,805	125*	50.68	1999–2022
7	(India) **Pratika Rawal**	141	132	32	4,814	154*	48.14	1995–2009
8	(Australia) **Ellyse Perry**	165	137	44	4,504	112*	48.43	2007–25
9	(India) **Smriti Mandhana**	117	117	7	5,322	136	48.38	2013–25
10	(Australia) **Beth Mooney**	92	84	22	2,997	138	48.33	2016–25
Qualification for inclusion: 20 innings. Names in **bold text** are current players whose figures are likely to change. * denotes not out. Source: ESPNcricinfo. Correct to 31 December 2025

=== T20 Internationals ===
Rank	Batter	T20Is	Innings	N.O.	Runs	Highest	Ave.	T20I Career
1	(Isle of Man) **Lucy Barnett**	34	33	9	1,222	96	50.91	2022–25
2	(Australia) **Beth Mooney**	112	106	26	3,381	117*	42.26	2016–25
3	(Australia) **Tahlia McGrath**	56	42	15	1,138	91*	42.14	2021–25
4	(Germany) **Christina Gough**	53	50	15	1,364	101*	38.97	2019–25
5	(India) Mithali Raj	89	84	21	2,364	97*	37.52	2006–19
6	(Austria) **Andrea-Mae Zepeda**	47	47	12	1,312	101	37.48	2019–25
7	(Australia) Meg Lanning	132	121	28	3,405	133*	36.61	2010–23
8	(South Africa) **Laura Wolvaardt**	85	79	18	2,225	115*	36.47	2016–25
9	(Netherlands) **Sterre Kalis**	62	62	10	1,893	126*	36.40	2018–26
10	(Cricket West Indies) **Stafanie Taylor**	126	123	25	3,426	90	34.95	2008–25
Qualification for inclusion: 20 innings. Names in **bold text** are current players whose figures are likely to change. * denotes not out. Source: ESPNcricinfo. Last updated: 1 February 2026

== Alternatives ==
Alternative measures of batting effectiveness have been developed, including:

=== Strike rate ===
Strike rate measures a different concept to batting average – how quickly the batsman scores (i.e. average number of runs from 100 balls) – so it does not supplant the role of batting average. It is used particularly in limited overs matches, where the speed at which a batter scores is more important than it is in first-class cricket. Strike rate may also be used to compare a player's ability to score runs against differing types of bowling (i.e. spin, fast bowling).

=== Player rankings ===
A system of player rankings was developed to produce a better indication of players' current standings than is provided by comparing their averages.

== See also ==
- Cricket statistics
- Batting average
- Bowling average
