= List of Maharashtra cricketers =

This is a list of all cricketers who have played first-class, list A or Twenty20 cricket for Maharashtra cricket team. Seasons given are first and last seasons; the player did not necessarily play in all the intervening seasons. Players in bold have played international cricket.

== A ==
- Kiran Adhav, 2001/02-2009/10
- Ashutosh Agashe, 1996/97-1999/00
- Dnyaneshwar Agashe, 1962/63-1967/68
- Salil Agharkar, 2007/08-2008/09
- **Syed Mushtaq Ali**, 1940/41
- **Salil Ankola**, 1988/89-1989/90
- Azhar Ansari, 2008/09-2014/15
- Kaushik Aphale, 1999/00-2005/06
- Sachin Aradhye, 1999/00-2002/03
- Jakwan adil jair sheikh, 2025/26

== B ==
- Satyajeet Bachhav, 2012/13-2015/16
- Riaz Bagwan, 1983/84
- **Sairaj Bahutule**, 2005/06-2007/08
- Vasant Bahutule, 1952/53
- Shamsher Baloch, 1941/42
- Abdul Balooch, 1956/57-1958/59
- Shudamshi Banerjee, 1944/45-1947/48
- Ankit Bawne, 2007/08-2015/16
- Ravindra Bhadbhade, 1951/52-1954/55
- Ratnagar Bhajekal, 1957/58-1959/60
- Ramakrishna Bhajekar, 1940/41-1941/42
- Rajendra Bhalekar, 1972/73-1985/86
- Narayan Bhalerao, 1956/57-1957/58
- Kamal Bhandarkar, 1939/40-1949/50
- Arjunrao Bharbhare, 1954/55
- Prayag Bhati, 2010/11-2015/16
- Kedar Bhave, 1987/88
- Ramachandra Bhave, 1954/55-1959/60
- Surendra Bhave, 1986/87-2000/01
- Aditya Bhide, 1969/70
- Vishnu Bhide, 1954/55
- Kishor Bhikane, 2009/10-2011/12
- Vishal Bhilare, 2007/08
- Prashant Bhoir, 2006/07
- Rohan Bhosale, 2008/09-2011/12
- Rao Bhosle, 1952/53-1960/61
- Shailesh Bhosle, 2001/02-2002/03
- Vijay Bhosle, 1955/56-1966/67
- **Chandu Borde**, 1952/53-1972/73
- Ramesh Borde, 1972/73-1984/85
- Suyash Burkul, 2001/02-2006/07
- shubham yewale,2023/03-20224/05

== C ==
- Sambhaji Chabukswar, 1948/49-1951/52
- Raghunath Chandorkar, 1943/44-1946/47
- Vasant Chandorkar, 1956/57-1961/62
- Venkat Chari, 1941/42-1950/51
- Dattatraya Chaudhari, 1947/48-1960/61
- Sachin Chaudhari, 2012/13-2013/14
- **Chetan Chauhan**, 1967/68-1974/75
- Ajay Chavan, 2002/03-2004/05
- Pushkaraj Chavan, 2013/14
- Sangram Chavan, 2004/05-2005/06
- Sumit Chavan, 2011/12
- Parag Chitale, 1993/94-1998/99
- shubham devidas yewale,2012/13-2016/17

== D ==
- Sandeep Dahad, 1995/96-2001/02
- Kishanlal Dalaya, 1941/42
- Anand Dalvi, 1998/99-2002/03
- Madhukar Dalvi, 1947/48-1948/49
- Mandar Dalvi, 1997/98-2004/05
- **Bal Dani**, 1951/52-1953/54
- Avdhoot Dandekar, 2019/20–2021/22
- Randolf Daniel, 1982/83-1988/89
- Akshay Darekar, 2010/11-2015/16
- Umesh Dastane, 1978/79
- Manohar Datar, 1948/49-1950/51
- SV Datar, 1935/36-1936/37
- D. B. Deodhar, 1934/35-1946/47
- Sharad Deodhar, 1947/48-1948/49
- Pratik Desai, 2006/07-2007/08
- Praveen Deshetti, 2006/07
- MA Deshmukh, 1934/35-1941/42
- Nitin Deshmukh, 1989/90
- Vishwas Deshmukh, 1975/76-1978/79
- Abhijit Deshpande, 1986/87-1991/92
- Anand Deshpande, 1989/90-1990/91
- Anant Dhamane, 1960/61-1963/64
- Sayajirao Dhanawade, 1948/49-1950/51
- Rahul Dholepatil, 2000/01-2001/02
- Nikit Dhumal, 2012/13-2015/16
- Suresh Dhumke, 1971/72
- Ajay Divecha, 1960/61-1961/62
- Jayant Diwadkar, 1952/53-1956/57
- Makarand Dixit, 1980/81-1984/85
- Nikhil Dixit, 1996/97-2000/01
- Gregory D'Monte, 1981/82-1989/90
- Dinshaw Doctor, 1935/36-1952/53
- Aditya Dole, 2005/06-2008/09
- Amit Doshi, 1999/00
- Yogesh Doshi, 1993/94-1995/96

== F ==
- Kaiser Fakih, 1980/81-1989/90
- Samad Fallah, 2007/08-2015/16

== G ==
- **Chandrasekhar Gadkari**, 1947/48
- Ganesh Gaikwad, 2008/09-2012/13
- Shekhar Gawli, 1997/98-2001/02
- A Ghag, 2000/01
- Arun Ghatpande, 1975/76-1979/80
- **Mohammed Ghazali**, 1942/43-1946/47 (played international cricket for Pakistan)
- Surjuram Girdhari, 1941/42
- Manohar Godbole, 1947/48
- Niranjan Godbole, 1995/96-2004/05
- Siddarth Godbole, 1998/99
- Mahendra Gokhale, 1998/99
- Yeshwant Gokhale, 1936/37-1950/51
- Hemant Gore, 1959/60-1966/67
- Vishwas Gore, 1966/67-1971/72
- Umesh Gotkhindikar, 1995/96-1998/99
- Sunil Gudge, 1979/80-1996/97
- Swapnil Gugale, 2010/11-2015/16
- Deorao Gundi, 1946/47-1951/52
- Milind Gunjal, 1978/79-1992/93
- Chitaman Gupte, 1940/41
- Madhukar Gupte, 1961/62-1977/78
- Prabhakar Gupte, 1937/38
- Rajaram Gurav, 1957/58
- Gopal Gurkhude, 2006/07
- Geet Katariya, 2014/15-2016/17

== H ==
- **Hanumant Singh**, 1964/65
- **Enamul Haque**, 2008/09 (played international cricket for Bangladesh)
- Jacob Harris, 1936/37-1939/40
- Govind Hasabnis, 1954/55-1961/62
- Krishna Havaldar, 1962/63-1964/65
- Ramesh Hazare, 1986/87-1992/93
- **Vijay Hazare**, 1934/35-1941/42

== I ==
- Sameer Inamdar, 1992/93-1998/99
- Ajit Indulkar, 1981/82
- Mahipatrao Indulkar, 1951/52
- Pradeep Ingle, 1975/76-1977/78
- AS Irani, 1934/35
- Naushir Irani, 1959/60-1960/61

== J ==
- Avinash Jadhav, 1993/94
- Dheeraj Jadhav, 1999/00-2006/07
- **Kedar Jadhav**, 2006/07-2015/16
- Krishnarao Jadhav, 1936/37-1947/48
- Rohit Jadhav, 2005/06-2006/07
- Shrikant Jadhav, 1982/83-1993/94
- Sunil Jadhav, 2007/08
- Vaibhav Govind Jadhav, 2000/2001
- Raja of Jath, 1935/36-1951/52
- Bhagtheria Jayantilal, 1969/70
- Santosh Jedhe, 1989/90-1997/98
- **Naoomal Jeoomal**, 1941/42
- Bhalchandra Joglekar, 1985/86-1989/90
- Domnic Joseph, 2011/12-2015/16
- Avinash Joshi, 1961/62-1969/70
- Ajinkya Joshi, 2004/05-2011/12
- Dhundhiraj Joshi, 1957/58-1961/62
- **Nana Joshi**, 1946/47-1964/65
- Sham Joshi, 1948/49-1949/50
- Vithal Joshi, 1966/67-1975/76

== K ==
- Swaroop Kabadi, 1967/68-1972/73
- Kaustuba Kadam, 1997/98
- Ramesh Kadam, 1987/88
- Yuvraj Kadam, 1990/91-1991/92
- Bhagwan Kakad, 1996/97
- Rohit Kakade, 2004/05
- Sujit Kalbhor, 2001/02
- **Abhijit Kale**, 1993/94-2005/06
- Shrikant Kalyani, 1983/84-1988/89
- Dilip Kamath, 1965/66
- Indrajeet Kamtekar, 1994/95-2001/02
- Ranjit Kamtekar, 2001/02
- Prasad Kanade, 1990/91-1995/96
- Rahul Kanade, 1995/96-1998/99
- **Hemant Kanitkar**, 1963/64-1977/78
- **Hrishikesh Kanitkar**, 1994/95-2007/08
- Danesh Kayani, 1996/97
- Shamshuzama Kazi, 2014/15-2015/16
- Vinod Kedar, 1971/72-1973/74
- Dhruv Kelavkar, 1989/90
- VV Ketkar, 1945/46
- Harshad Khadiwale, 2006/07-2015/16
- Kashinath Khadkikar, 2002/03-2004/05
- Prashant Khopkar, 1993–94
- Azim Khan, 1983/84-1987/88
- Akhlaq Khan, 1964/65-1970/71
- Kuddus Khan, 1956/57-1965/66
- Nissar Khan, 1958/59-1959/60
- Noor Khan, 2007/08
- Nitin Khaniwale, 1977/78-1981/82
- Bhikaji Kharat, 1957/58-1958/59
- Vinayak Khedkar, 1985/86-1988/89
- Aniruddha Kher, 1985/86
- Datta Kher, 1958/59-1965/66
- Ranjit Khirid, 2001/02-2005/06
- Saeed Khot, 2001/02-2002/03
- Chirag Khurana, 2008/09-2015/16
- Hemant Kinikar, 1992/93-2000/01
- Sanjay Kirtane, 1964/65-1970/71
- **Gogumal Kishenchand**, 1941/42
- Sharad Kolhatkar, 1968/69-1969/70
- Sanjay Kondhalkar, 1989/90-2001/02
- Manish Kotasthane, 1990/91-1991/92
- Ganesh Kukade, 2008/09
- Charudatta Kulkarni, 2003/04
- Milind Kulkarni, 1992/93-2000/01
- Sudhir Kulkarni, 1970/71-1971/72

== L ==
- Mohan Lal, 1948/49
- Satyen Lande, 1992/93-2000/01
- Rajendra Lele, 1980/81-1981/82
- Sandeep Lele, 2002/03
- C. Limaye, 1964/65 (Note: Played only once for the team in first-class cricket. Other than initials and a surname, no biographical details are known.)

== M ==
- KM Madhavan, 1934/35 (Note: Played in only one first-class match. Other than initials and a surname, no biographical details are known.)
- Prakashi Malve, 1971/72
- Shalu Mandar, 1996/97
- Gopal Mane, 1946/47-1947/48
- Mun Mangela, 2008/09
- **Vijay Manjrekar**, 1966/67-1969/70
- **Vinoo Mankad**, 1943/44
- Rajendra Manohar, 1992/93-1993/94
- **Madhav Mantri**, 1942/43
- Kunal Marathe, 2004/05
- Marutirao Mathe, 1951/52-1960/61
- Arvind Mehendale, 1974/75
- RK Modgil, 1952/53
- Sher Mohammad, 1954/55-1964/65
- Dhruv Mohan, 2003/04-2007/08
- Ashok Mohol, 1968/69
- Sadanand Mohol, 1959/60-1970/71
- Balkrishna Mohoni, 1934/35-1941/42
- Malcolm Montero, 2006/07
- Mahendra More, 1990/91-1996/97
- Prabhakar More, 1991/92
- Vishant More, 2007/08-2015/16
- Rohit Motwani, 2006/07-2015/16
- Baba Mullick, 1937/38-1938/39
- Shrikant Mundhe, 2006/07-2015/16

== N ==
- **Bapu Nadkarni**, 1951/52-1959/60
- Sushil Nadkarni, 1995/96
- Noshirvan Nagarwala, 1934/35-1939/40
- Mutyalswami Naidu, 1934/35-1940/41
- Hanumant Naik, 1957/58
- Nikhil Naik, 2012/13-2015/16
- Sachin Nair, 1998/99-2003/04
- Karansinh Nandey, 2011/12
- Jaideep Narse, 1992/93-2002/03
- Syed Nazir Ali, 1934/35-1941/42
- Anant Neralkar, 1992/93
- Mansingh Nigade, 2005/06-2006/07
- B. B. Nimbalkar, 1941/42-1950/51
- R. B. Nimbalkar, 1934/35-1940/41
- Suryaji Nimbalkar, 1980/81-1982/83

== O ==
- Aniruddha Oak, 1997/98-2002/03
- Sham Oak, 1981/82-1991/92

== P ==
- Prashant Bhoir, 2008/09
- Sadashiv Palsule, 1948/49-1951/52
- PN Pandav, 1964/65
- Nikhil Pande, 2002/03-2003/04
- Ranjit Pande, 1997/98-1998/99
- Bal Pandit, 1959/60
- Vinayak Pandit, 1942/43-1944/45
- Nikhil Paradkar, 2006/07-2014/15
- Madhav Paranjpe, 1941/42-1951/52
- **Chandrakant Patankar**, 1966/67
- **Munaf Patel**, 2005/06-2007/08
- Pravin Shyama Salian, 2000/2004
- Afzal Pathan, 1974/75-1979/80
- Amit Patil, 2004/05-2005/06
- Dattatraya Patil, 1951/52
- Jitendra Patil, 2006/07-2009/10
- **Sadashiv Patil**, 1952/53-1963/64
- Subhash Patki, 1958/59-1959/60
- Subhash Patne, 1976/77-1977/78
- Gajanan Patwardhan, 1947/48-1951/52
- Manohar Patwardhan, 1937/38-1941/42
- Vedant Patwardhan, 1999/00
- Yogesh Pawar, 2002/03-2005/06
- Satish Pednekar, 1968/69-1972/73
- **Dattu Phadkar**, 1942/43-1943/44
- Nandan Phadnis, 1986/87-1995/96
- **Riaz Poonawala**, 1982/83-1987/88
- Krishnajirao Powar, 1953/54-1960/61
- Shankarrao Powar, 1940/41
- Prasad Pradhan, 1981/82-1987/88
- Hanumant Pujari, 2009/10

== R ==
- Prakash Rajguru, 1965/66
- Avinash Ranade, 1977/78-1978/79
- Madhav Ranade, 1975/76-1977/78
- **Khandu Rangnekar**, 1939/40-1941/42
- Shubham Ranjane, 2011/12-2012/13
- Subash Ranjane, 1984/85-2001/02
- **Vasant Ranjane**, 1956/57-1970/71
- **Yalaka Venugopal Rao**, 2007/08
- Abhishek Raut, 2005/06-2006/07
- Chandrakant Raut, 1972/73
- Prasant Ray, 1991/92-1993/94
- **Madhusudan Rege**, 1944/45-1954/55
- Jacob Reuben, 1952/53
- Kishan Rungta, 1953/54

* Roshan aher 2024

== S ==
- Nicholas Saldanha, 1963/64-1977/78
- Stanley Saldanha, 1975/76-1981/82
- Pandurang Salgaoncar, 1971/72-1981/82
- Madhukar Salvi, 1965/66-1967/68
- Ramachandra Salvi, 1939/40-1959/60
- Mandar Sane, 1995/96-2002/03
- Narayan Sane, 1935/36
- Wasuderao Sane, 1937/38
- Anupam Sanklecha, 2004/05-2015/16
- **Chandu Sarwate**, 1940/41-1942/43
- Satyajit Satbhai, 2001/02-2006/07
- Mukund Sathe, 1958/59
- Mohsin Sayyed, 2011/12
- Wahid Sayyed, 2007/08-2008/09
- Sagar Shah, 1999/00-2003/04
- Parag Shahane, 1997/98-1999/00
- Abbas Shaikh, 1971/72-1974/75
- Anwar Shaikh, 1965/66-1977/78
- Mustafa Shaikh, 1979/80
- Naushad Shaikh, 2015/16
- Samir Shaikh, 1999/00-2001/02
- Rajeev Sharangapani, 1975/76
- Vijay Sharma, 1978/79-1981/82
- Ayub Sheikh, 1955/56
- Rajbhau Shelke, 1951/52
- Vijay Shetty, 1975/76-1985/86
- Deepak Shilamkar, 2006/07-2009/10
- Kshitij Shinde, 2004/05
- **Sadu Shinde**, 1940/41-1949/50
- Ameya Shrikhande, 2007/08-2011/12
- **Iqbal Siddiqui**, 1992/93-2004/05
- Pradeep Sidhaye, 1975/76-1979/80
- Yeshwant Sidhaye, 1952/53-1966/67
- **Ranga Sohoni**, 1935/36-1959/60
- Bharat Solanki, 2012/13-2015/16
- Anant Solkar, 1976/77-1980/81
- Mirmisa Sridhar, 1973/74
- **Sridharan Sriram**, 2006/07
- Shantanu Sugwekar, 1987/88-2001/02
- Jaffar Suleiman, 1934/35
- Sajin Sureshnath, 2009/10-2014/15
- Ashish Suryawanshi, 2006/07-2007/08

== T ==
- Yogesh Takawale, 2005/06-2007/08
- Suhas Talim, 1972/73-1975/76
- NG Talukdar, 1935/36-1936/37 (Note: Played only one first-class match. Other than initials and a surname, no biographical details are known.)
- Hemant Talwalkar, 1977/78-1984/85
- Madhav Tamhankar, 1961/62
- Taranjeet Singh, 2009/10-2011/12
- Ashish Tibrewala, 2004/05
- Gaurappa Todalbaji, 1961/62-1964/65
- Shriram Torvi, 1978/79-1980/81
- Sachin Tendulkar1989/2013
- Sandeep Trigune, 2002/03
- Rahul Tripathi, 2009/10-2015/16
- Trimbak Tulpule, 1934/35-1936/37

== U ==
- Vaibhav Govind Jadhav, 2000–2001

== V ==
- Mangesh Vaidya, 1993/94-1997/98
- R. Vaidya, 1980/81
- S. Vanspal, 1948/49–1949/50 (Note: Played two first-class matches. Other than an initial and a surname, no biographical details are known.)

== W ==
- Digambar Waghmare, 2006/07-2010/11
- Anil Walhekar, 1981/82-1988/89
- Srinivas Wayangankar, 1963/64

== Y ==
- Sunil Yadav, 2011/12-2013/14
- **Yajurvindra Singh**, 1971/72-1978/79
- Mohammad Yakub, 1934/35
- Anand Yalvigi, 2001/02
- DK Yarde, 1940/41
- Ravindra Yerawadekar, 1989/90-1992/93

== Z ==
- Vijay Zol, 2011/12-2014/15
