= Sports in Pune =

Sports in Indian city

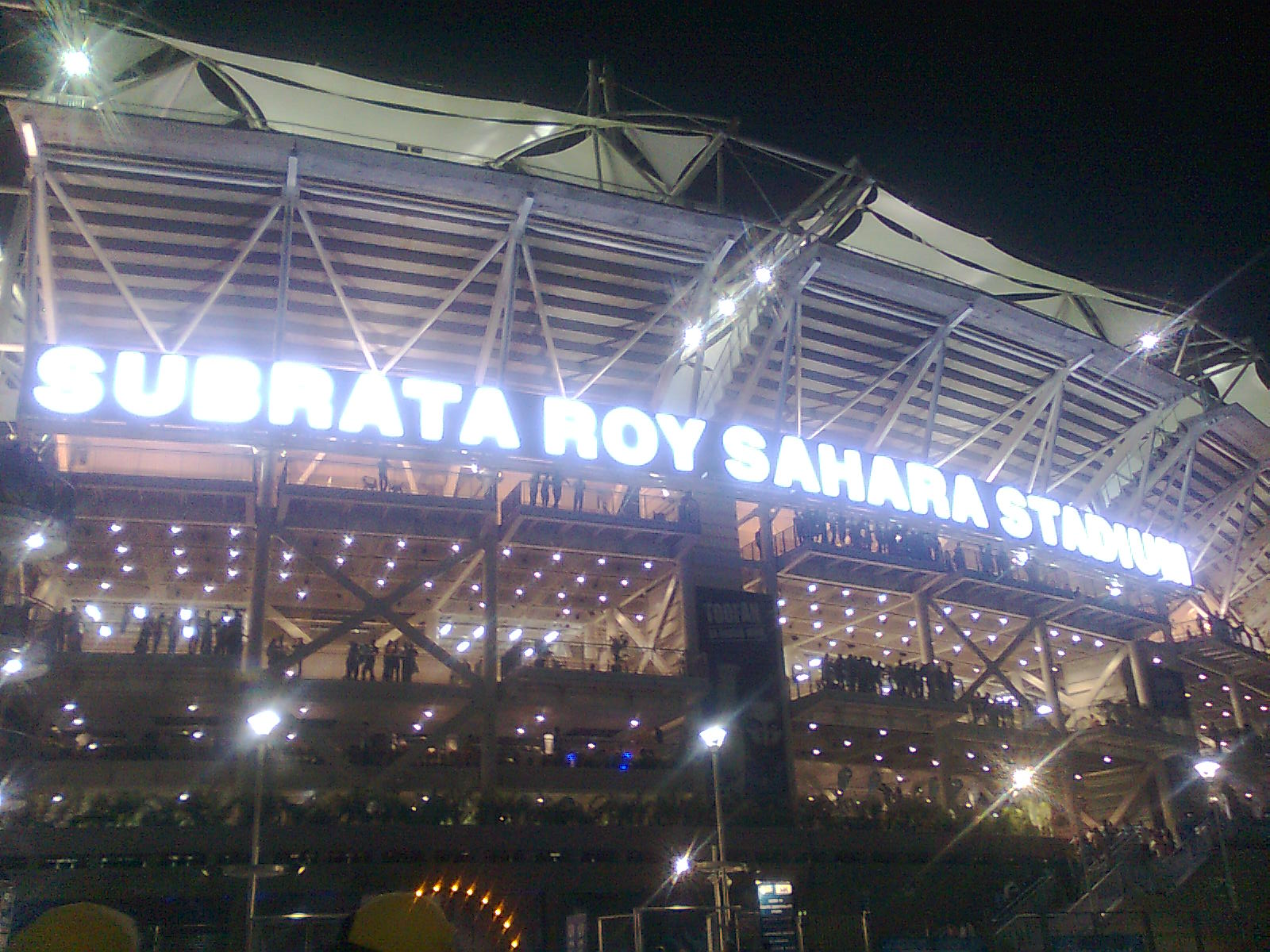
Subrata Roy Sahara Stadium

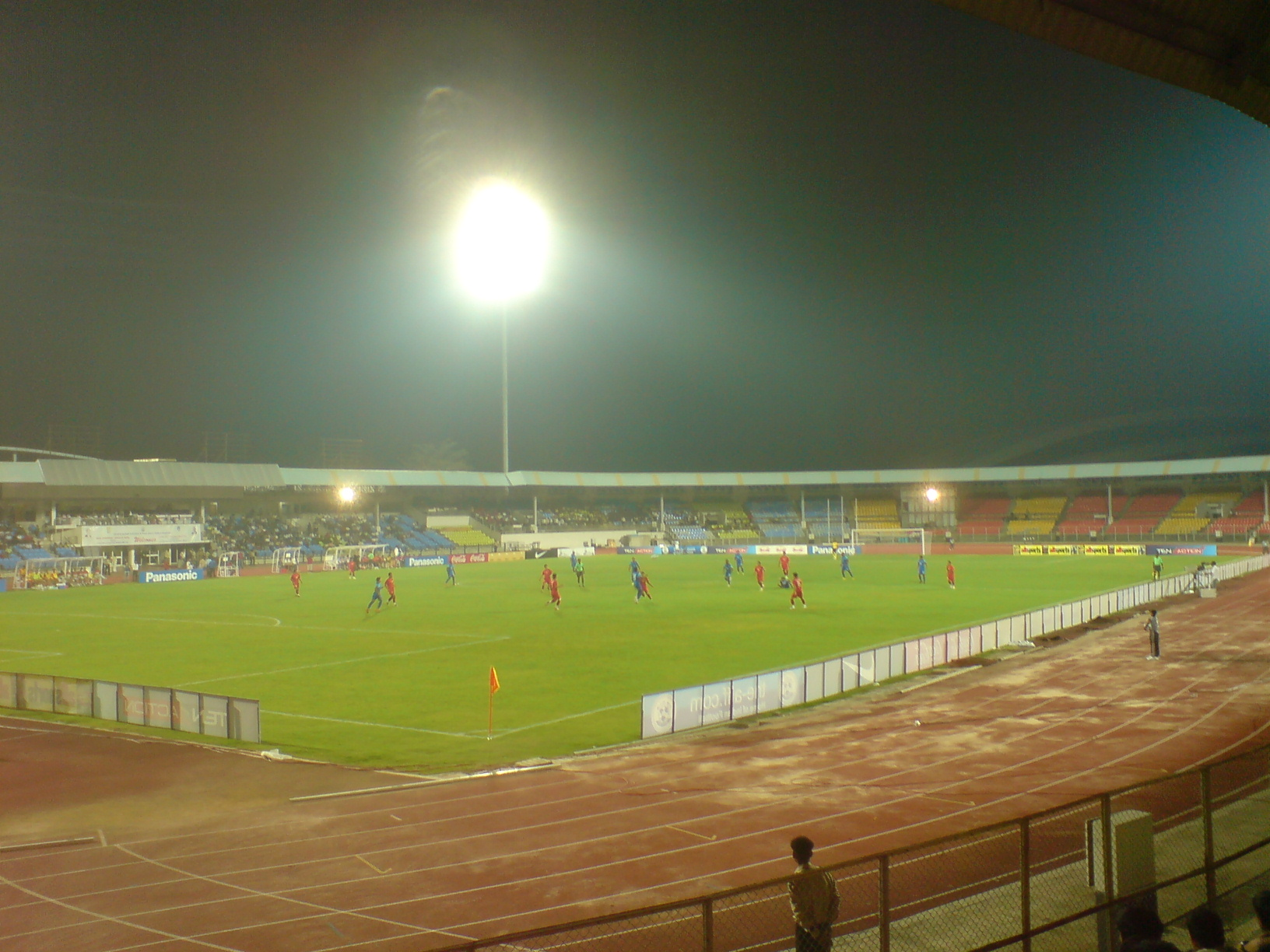
Shree Shiv Chhatrapati Sports Complex

Popular games and sports in Pune include athletics, cricket, basketball, badminton, field hockey, football, tennis, kabaddi, paragliding, kho-kho, rowing and chess. The Pune International Marathon is an annual marathon conducted in Pune. The 2008 Commonwealth Youth Games were held in Pune.

== History ==
=== Badminton ===
The beginnings of badminton can be traced to mid-19th-century Pune (then known as Poona). During a party, a few guests fastened feathers onto champagne corks and used the bottles as bats. They called this game Poonai. The first rules of the game were written in Pune in 1873, by the British.

Pune 7 Aces is the badminton team that represents the city in Premier Badminton League.

=== Cricket ===
Cricket is played between clubs affiliated with the Maharashtra Cricket Association, which maintains a domestic cricket team (the Maharashtra cricket team). This team, one of three based in the state of Maharashtra, competes in interstate matches and leagues such as the Ranji Trophy. Jawaharlal Nehru Stadium is where National and One Day International matches take place. It has been named after the First Prime Minister of Independent India, Pandit Jawaharlal Nehru.

An Indian Premier League cricket team based in Pune began play in 2011. A new stadium Subrata Roy Sahara Stadium built in Gahunje on the Mumbai–Pune expressway, inaugurated on 1 April 2012, is the home ground. The Subrata Roy Sahara Stadium has a seating capacity of 55,000 and is built on the Mumbai Pune Expressway. The team was named Pune Warriors India and was brought for Rs.1702 Crores or $370 million. It is the most expensive team in the Indian Premier League, and was owned by Sahara Group. The cost was a frequent concern for the team that lead to withdrawing prior to the 2012 season. The league helped fund the team so they could compete in the competition but eventually they folded following the 2013 season.

Blades of Glory, India's first cricket museum, is based in Pune, run by Rohan Pate, a former Maharashtra Under-19 cricketer, inaugurated during IPL V by Sachin Tendulkar and located in the quaint Sahakar Nagar.

=== Football ===
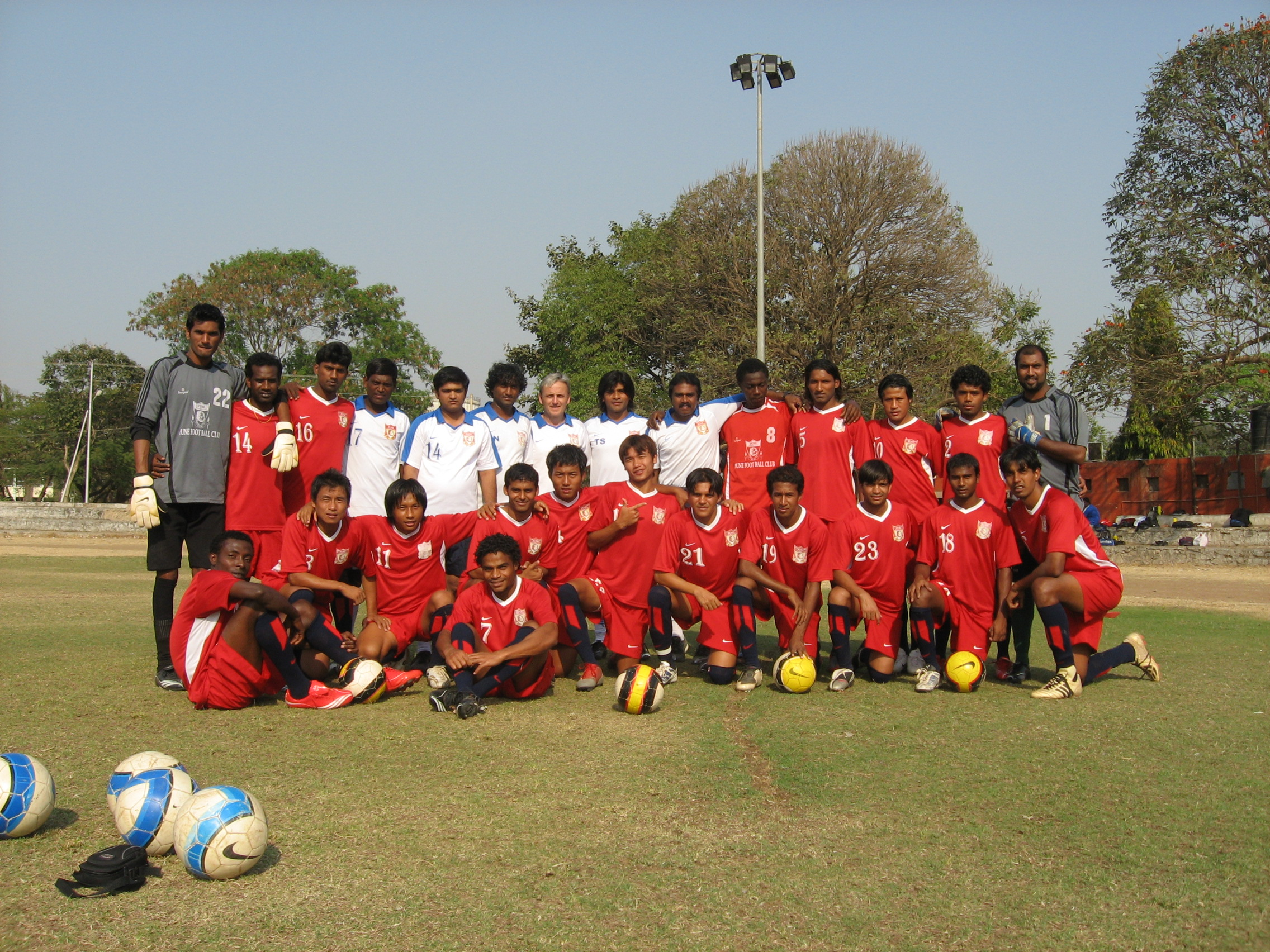
Pune FC

The Pune Football Club, also known as Pune FC, is a football club that plays in the Indian Football League. It was established in August 2007.

=== Basketball ===
Pune has basketball at the Deccan Gymkhana club and at Fergusson College. American coach J. D. Walsh held his first JDBasketball India camp in Pune.

=== American football ===
The Elite Football League of India (ELFI) – an American gridiron football competition slated for a fall 2012 kickoff – announced that the Pune Marathas will be a member-franchise.

When the Elite Football League of India was introduced in August 2011, Pune was noted as one of eight cities to be awarded a team for the inaugural season, although the team's games would be played in Balewadi. All 56 games of EFLI's opening season were to be played at the Shree Shiv Chhatrapati Sports Complex, which was retrofitted to host the sport. Named the Pune Marathas, it was Pune's first professional American football franchise.

=== Marathon ===
Pune International Marathon is an annual marathon foot-race held in Pune. The first edition of the race was begun in 1983, and the 20th edition was held in 2005. It attracts many international participants who compete with local and national runners in the distinct climate of the Indian subcontinent. It hosted the Asian Marathon Championship race in 2010.

=== Rugby ===
Pune has a rugby team, men's and women's, registered with the IRFU as Rugby Football Sports Pune (RFS Pune). As of November 2010, RFS Pune has qualified for First Division Rugby, while placing second in the Callaghan Cup held in Chennai in the same month. Pune offers much promise in this sport. The women's team has been the national cup holder for two consecutive years and thrice since the all India women's 7s 2009. To date, the Pune Women's team has 13 and counting India international players.

=== Kabaddi ===
Puneri Paltan is a Kabaddi team based in Pune that plays in the Pro Kabaddi League. The team is currently led by Deepak Niwas Hooda and coached by K.Bhaskaran. The team is owned by Insurekot Sports. Paltan play their home matches at the Shree Shiv Chhatrapati Sports Complex.

=== Darts ===
International darts player Ashfaque Sayed represented India for the PDC Worldcup telecast live on Ten Sports in 2007.

=== Derby ===
The Pune Race course, located in Pune Cantonment, was built in 1830 over 118.5 acres (0.480 km^{2}) of land. The land is controlled by the Indian Army. The racing season is from July to October every year. The Royal Western India Turf Club manages the race course. The course has two training tracks and two racing surfaces. Major racing events include the Pune Derby, RWITC Invitational, Independence Cup and Southern Command Cup.

=== Japanese Martial arts Karate ===
Japan Karate-Do Nobukawa-Ha Shito-Ryu Kai India JKNSKI Japan Karatedo Shito-Ryu International Renshikan is a direct branch of Japan Karate-Do Nobukawaha Shito-Ryu Kai recognised in Japan. Nobukawa member of Japan Karate-Do Federation, Asian Karate Federation and World Karate Federation. The JKNSKI is headed by Naresh Sharma who is an international martial arts title holder and advanced dan grade in the Japanese martial arts.

=== Gliding ===
Gliding Centre Pune

The Gliding Centre is an undertaking of the Directorate General of Civil Aviation, Civil Aviation Department, Government of India. It uses two-seater sailplanes, LET L-23 Super Blanik and other LET gliding planes. The flying season starts in October and continues to May or early June. The club is closed during the monsoons. It is open Sunday to Thursday except public holidays, Sundays is an open day for joyrides, and Monday to Thursday are for training.

=== Others ===
Garware Balbhavan is a well known playground and a recreational center located in the heart of the Pune city. It has done meaningful work in the field of child development since 1985. Balbhavan is a living institute that seeks to make Pune India's first child-centric city. There are regular batches of roller skating at Balbhavan.

The National Education Foundation organises Enduro3, a cross country adventure race in Pune. It is normally a two- or three-day event with activities like cycling, trekking, river-crossing and rifle shooting. The city was host to the 2009 FIVB Men's Junior World Championship.

== Teams ==
Sport	Club	League	Venue	Status
Cricket	Pune Warriors India	Indian Premier League	Maharashtra Cricket Association Stadium	Defunct
Cricket	Rising Pune Supergiant	Indian Premier League	Maharashtra Cricket Association Stadium	Defunct
Cricket	Maharashtra Cricket Team	Ranji Trophy and Vijay Hazare Trophy	Maharashtra Cricket Association Stadium	Active
Cricket	Veer Marathi	Celebrity Cricket League	Maharashtra Cricket Association Stadium	Active
Cricket	Sinhagad Supremos	Maharashtra Premier League	Deccan Gymkhana Ground	Active
Football	Pune FC	I-League	Shree Shiv Chhatrapati Sports Complex	Defunct
Football	Bharat FC	I-League	Shree Shiv Chhatrapati Sports Complex	Active
Football	FC Pune City	Indian Super League	Shree Shiv Chhatrapati Sports Complex	Defunct
Football	DSK Shivajians F.C.	I-League 2nd Division	Shree Shiv Chhatrapati Sports Complex	Active
Badminton	Pune 7 Aces	Premier Badminton League	Shree Shiv Chhatrapati Sports Complex	Defunct
Badminton	Pune Pistons	Indian Badminton League	Shree Shiv Chhatrapati Sports Complex	Defunct
Field Hockey	Pune Strykers	World Series Hockey	PCMC Hockey Stadium	Defunct
Kabaddi	Puneri Paltan	Pro Kabaddi League	Shree Shiv Chhatrapati Sports Complex	Active
Lawn Tennis	Pune Marathas	Champions Tennis League	Shree Shiv Chhatrapati Sports Complex	Active
Basketball	Pune Peshwas	UBA Pro Basketball League	Shree Shiv Chhatrapati Sports Complex	Active
Table Tennis	Puneri Paltan T.T.	Ultimate Table Tennis	Shree Shiv Chhatrapati Sports Complex	Active
American football	Pune Marathas	Elite Football League of India	Shree Shiv Chhatrapati Sports Complex	Active
Karate	Pune	Japan Karatedo Shito-Ryu International Renshikan	Pune, Maharashtra	Active

== Sport institutions ==
Prominent sporting institutions in Pune include the Nehru Stadium, the Deccan Gymkhana, PYC Hindu Gymkhana, Maharashtra Cricket Association Cricket Stadium and Shree Shiv Chhatrapati Sports Complex.

The Nehru Stadium is the home ground of the Maharashtra cricket team, and has hosted many prominent cricket events, including one of the matches in the 1996 Cricket World Cup.

A new cricket stadium, Pune International Cricket Centre, is a premier cricket stadium in Gahunje on the Mumbai-Pune Expressway near Pune. This is the headquarters for the Maharashtra Cricket Association and home for the Maharashtra cricket team. It has hosted the home matches of Sahara Pune Warriors, IPL team of Pune.

The Deccan Gymkhana has hosted Davis Cup tennis matches on several occasions. The facility at Balewadi hosted the National Games in 1994 as well as the 2008 Commonwealth Youth Games.

The Royal Connaught Boat Club is one of several boating clubs on the Mula-Mutha river.

== Sports persons ==
=== Cricketers ===
- Ruturaj Gaikwad
- Hemu Adhikari
- Kedar Bhave
- Surendra Bhave
- Chandu Borde
- Ajay Chavan
- Soniya Dabir
- Pratik Desai
- D. B. Deodhar
- Ganesh Gaikwad
- Mahendra Gokhale
- Kedar Jadhav
- Hemant Kanitkar
- Hrishikesh Kanitkar
- Robert Mackenzie
- Arvind Mehendale
- Balkrishna Mohoni
- Rohit Motwani
- Parag More
- Sushil Nadkarni
- Ujwala Nikam
- Aniruddha Oak
- Arthur O'Bree
- Bal Pandit
- Cecil Paris
- Snehal Pradhan
- Chandrakant Raut
- Cyril Reed
- Chandra Sathe
- Mukund Sathe
- Lisa Sthalekar
- Yogesh Takawale
- Arati Vaidya

=== Hockey ===
- Dhanraj Pillay
- Vikram Pillay
- Eliza Nelson

=== Football ===
- Sandesh Gadkari
- Prakash Thorat

=== Badminton ===
- Suman Deodhar
- Nikhil Kanetkar
- Aditi Mutatkar
- Kashmira Joglekar

=== Tennis ===
- Radhika Tulpule
- Gaurav Natekar
- Nitin Kirtane
- Ashvarya Shrivastava

=== Shooting ===
- Anisa Sayyed

=== Table tennis ===
- Meena Parande
- Sujay Ghorpade

=== Chess ===
- Abhijit Kunte
- Soumya Swaminathan
- Eesha Karavade
- Kruttika Nadig
- Prathamesh Mokal
- Amruta Mokal

=== Billiards ===
- Pankaj Advani
- Wilson Jones

=== Weightlifting ===
- Ganesh Mali

=== Adventure ===
- NK Mahajan

=== Swimming ===
- Amar Muralidharan
- Arjun Muralidharan

=== Kabaddi ===
- Nitin Ghule

=== Basketball ===
- Eban Hyams

=== Japanese Martial Arts Karate ===
- Naresh Sharma
