= List of West Zone cricketers =

This is a list of all cricketers who have played first-class or List A cricket for West Zone cricket team.

Last updated at the end of the 2015/16 season.

== A–F ==
- Iqbal Abdulla
- Hemu Adhikari
- Sudhakar Adhikari
- Ajit Agarkar
- Saeed Ahmed
- Khagesh Amin
- Amir Elahi
- Salil Ankola
- Kaushik Aphale
- Madhav Apte
- Tushar Arothe
- Harmeet Singh Baddhan
- Sairaj Bahutule
- Jaswant Bakrania
- Subhash Bandiwadekar
- Ankit Bawne
- Atul Bedade
- Rajendra Bhalekar
- Bhargav Bhatt
- Prakash Bhatt
- Surendra Bhave
- Ajit Bhoite
- Vijay Bhosle
- Chandu Borde
- Ramesh Borde
- Kiran Brahmabhatt
- Valmik Buch
- Jasprit Bumrah
- Pheroze Cambhatta
- Raghunath Chandorkar
- Ishwar Chaudhary
- Bhushan Chauhan
- Chetan Chauhan
- Kedar Chavan
- Siddharth Chitnis
- Akash Christian
- Dharmendra Chudasama
- Nari Contractor
- Madhav Dalvi
- Kirat Damani
- Amit Dani
- Bal Dani
- Randolf Daniel
- Akshay Darekar
- Sharad Deodhar
- Pravin Desai
- Ramakant Desai
- Kedar Devdhar
- Sayajirao Dhanawade
- Rakesh Dhruve
- Sameer Dighe
- Ajay Divecha
- Sharad Diwadkar
- Gregory D'Monte
- Shaukat Dudha
- Farokh Engineer
- Samad Fallah
- Tony Fernandes

== G–L ==
- Anshuman Gaekwad
- Datta Gaekwad
- Fatehsinghrao Gaekwad
- Sangramsinh Gaekwad
- Rajesh Garsondia
- Sunil Gavaskar
- Karsan Ghavri
- Jayasinghrao Ghorpade
- Jayendrasinh Ghorpade
- Niranjan Godbole
- Sunil Gudge
- Gul Mohammad
- Milind Gunjal
- Baloo Gupte
- Madhukar Gupte
- Shishir Hattangadi
- Saeed Hatteea
- Ranjit Hazare
- Sharad Hazare
- Sanjay Hazare
- Vijay Hazare
- Dattaram Hindlekar
- Deepak Hooda
- K. C. Ibrahim
- Kumar Indrajitsinhji
- Abdul Ismail
- Sheldon Jackson
- Bimal Jadeja
- Ravindra Jadeja
- Rajendra Jadeja
- Dheeraj Jadhav
- Kedar Jadhav
- Rohit Jadhav
- Shrikant Jadhav
- Wasim Jaffer
- Chirag Jani
- Santosh Jedhe
- Sandeep Jobanputra
- Manoj Joglekar
- Domnic Joseph
- Ashok Joshi
- Nana Joshi
- Shekhar Joshi
- Uday Joshi
- Vithal Joshi
- Manpreet Juneja
- Abhijit Kale
- Shrikant Kalyani
- Vinod Kambli
- Prasad Kanade
- Hemant Kanitkar
- Hrishikesh Kanitkar
- Pradeep Kasliwal
- Suresh Keshwala
- Harshad Khadiwale
- Azim Khan
- Zaheer Khan
- Aniruddha Kher
- Ranjit Khirid
- Hemant Kinikar
- Gogumal Kishenchand
- Sanjay Kondhalkar
- Shitanshu Kotak
- Sahil Kukreja
- Dhawal Kulkarni
- Milind Kulkarni
- Nilesh Kulkarni
- Raju Kulkarni
- Ravi Kulkarni
- Sulakshan Kulkarni
- Umesh Kulkarni
- Abey Kuruvilla
- Anil Lashkari

== M–R ==
- Ebrahim Maka
- Ashraf Makda
- Kamlesh Makvana
- Shridhar Mandale
- Vinayak Mane
- Sandip Maniar
- Sanjay Manjrekar
- Vijay Manjrekar
- Ashok Mankad
- Chetan Mankad
- Rahul Mankad
- Vinoo Mankad
- Madhav Mantri
- Jacob Martin
- Marutirao Mathe
- Atul Mehta
- Bhavin Mehta
- Niranjan Mehta
- Altaf Merchant
- Uday Merchant
- Vijay Merchant
- Milip Mewada
- Paras Mhambrey
- Bharat Mistry
- Nilesh Modi
- Rusi Modi
- Sadanand Mohol
- Kiran Mokashi
- Nayan Mongia
- Kiran More
- Robin Morris
- Rohit Motwani
- Shrikant Mundhe
- Amol Muzumdar
- Bapu Nadkarni
- Ramesh Nagdev
- Ajit Naik
- Sudhir Naik
- Dinesh Nanavati
- Mukesh Narula
- Suru Nayak
- Abhishek Nayar
- B. B. Nimbalkar
- Raosaheb Nimbalkar
- Shah Nyalchand
- Sham Oak
- Jayesh Odedra
- Nilesh Odedra
- Jayantilal Oza
- Ajit Pai
- A. J. Panchasara
- Chandrakant Pandit
- Atul Pandya
- Rishikesh Parab
- Satyajit Parab
- Jatin Paranjpe
- Dashrat Pardeshi
- Rakesh Parikh
- Ghulam Parkar
- Ramnath Parkar
- Zulfiqar Parkar
- Monish Parmar
- Mukund Parmar
- Dhiraj Parsana
- Hitesh Parsana
- Naresh Parsana
- Ashok Patel
- Axar Patel
- Jasu Patel
- Jayaprakash Patel
- Lalit Patel
- Munaf Patel
- Niraj Patel
- Parthiv Patel
- Pathik Patel
- Rakesh Patel
- Rashid Patel
- Smit Patel
- Chirag Pathak
- Irfan Pathan
- Irfan Pathan
- Yusuf Pathan
- Jitendra Patil
- Sandeep Patil
- Sadashiv Patil
- Sanjay Patil
- Kaustubh Pawar
- Rajesh Pawar
- Dattu Phadkar
- Riaz Poonawala
- Kiran Powar
- Krishnajirao Powar
- Ramesh Powar
- Prasad Pradhan
- Cheteshwar Pujara
- Pananmal Punjabi
- Bhavin Radia
- Ajinkya Rahane
- Madan Raiji
- Lalchand Rajput
- Gulabrai Ramchand
- Khandu Rangnekar
- Subash Ranjane
- Vasant Ranjane
- Ranvirsinhji
- Ambati Rayudu
- Milind Rege
- Madhusudan Rege

== S–Z ==
- Stanley Saldanha
- Pandurang Salgaoncar
- Aavishkar Salvi
- Balwinder Sandhu
- Jignesh Sanghani
- Dilip Sardesai
- Narayan Satham
- Santosh Saxena
- Harshad Shah
- Hiken Shah
- Pinal Shah
- Anwar Shaikh
- Rohit Sharma
- Ravi Shastri
- Shatrusalyasinhji
- Sher Mohammad
- Nishit Shetty
- Vijay Shetty
- Sadashiv Shinde
- Padmakar Shivalkar
- Deepak Shodhan
- Amit Shroff
- Iqbal Siddiqui
- Yeshwant Sidhaye
- Ranga Sohoni
- Rakesh Solanki
- Eknath Solkar
- Charlie Stayers
- Shantanu Sugwekar
- Sukhbir Singh
- Rusi Surti
- Rajesh Sutar
- R. A. Swaroop
- Suhas Talim
- Rakesh Tandon
- Keki Tarapore
- Aditya Tare
- Sachin Tendulkar
- Bhavik Thaker
- Ravindra Thakkar
- Shardul Thakur
- Siddharth Trivedi
- Siddharth Trivedi
- Polly Umrigar
- Jaydev Unadkat
- Murtuja Vahora
- Arun Varde
- Tejas Varsani
- Arpit Vasavada
- Dilip Vengsarkar
- Yalaka Venugopal Rao
- Jyotirvandan Vin
- Ajit Wadekar
- Vinit Wadkar
- Aditya Waghmode
- Yogendra Wakaskar
- Connor Williams
- Suryakumar Yadav
- Yajurvindra Singh
- Ravindra Yerawadekar
- Mohamed Zahid
- Avadhut Zarapkar
- Joy Zinto
- Vijay Zol
