= 2013–14 Duleep Trophy =

- Dates: 3 October 2013 – 21 October 2013
- Administrator: BCCI
- Cricket format: First-class cricket
- Tournament format: Knockout
- Champions: shared by North Zone (18th title) and South Zone (13th title)
- Participants: 5
- Matches: 4
- Most runs: Baba Aparajith (SZ) (326)
- Most wickets: Pragyan Ojha (SZ) (9)

The 2013–14 Duleep Trophy was the 53rd season of the Duleep Trophy, a first-class cricket tournament contested by five zonal teams of India: Central Zone, East Zone, North Zone, South Zone and West Zone.

The title was shared by North Zone and South Zone.

== Squads ==
Squads
Central Zone	East Zone	North Zone	South Zone	West Zone
Robin Bist	Ishank Jaggi	Ian Dev Singh	Abhinav Mukund	Wasim Jaffer (c)
Jalaj Saxena	Pallavkumar Das	Vaibhav Rawal	Rohan Prem	Rohit Motwani (wk)
Shalabh Srivastava	Govind Poddar	Unmukt Chand	Lokesh Rahul	Ankit Bawne
Naman Ojha (wk)	Biplab Samantray	Sarabjit Ladda	Baba Aparajith	Manprit Juneja
Tanmay Srivastava	Sunny Gupta	Nitin Saini (wk)	Manish Pandey	Hiken Shah
Ashok Menaria	Deepak Behera	Mandeep Singh	Chidhambaram Gautam (wk)	Harshad Khadiwale
Shrikant Wagh	Rameez Nemat	Parvinder Awana	Akshath Reddy	Rakesh Dhruv
Imtiaz Ahmed	Wriddhiman Saha (wk) (c)	Rajat Paliwal	Bodapati Sumanth	Suryakumar Yadav
Amit Paunikar	Ashok Dinda	Sandeep Sharma	Aushik Srinivas	Yusuf Pathan
Ankit Rajpoot	Shahbaz Nadeem	Siddarth Kaul	Sandeep Warrier	Akshay Darekar
Umesh Yadav	Basant Mohanty	Mohit Sharma	HS Sharath	Murtuja Vahora
Vineet Saxena	Subhrajit Roy	Rishi Dhawan	Malolan Rangarajan	Kamlesh Makvana
Piyush Chawla (c)	Abu Nechim	Harbhajan Singh (c)	Vinay Kumar (c)	Aditya Waghmode
Karn Sharma	Anustup Majumdar	Vikas Mishra	Abhimanyu Mithun	Samad Fallah
Mukul Dagar	Tarjinder Singh	Jiwanjot Singh	Chovvakkaran Shahid	Jaydev Unadkat

== Results ==
Quarterfinal
South Zone	FIL
West Zone

Semifinals
South Zone	W
Central Zone
East Zone
North Zone	C

Final
South Zone
North Zone

=== Quarter Final ===
3–6 October 2013

South Zone	v	West Zone
600/9 (171 overs); Manish Pandey 213; Rakesh Dhruv 3/183		287 (133 overs); Ankit Bawne 115; Malolan Rangarajan 5/101
44/1 (22.5 overs); Akshath Reddy 25*; Rakesh Dhruv 1/14

Match drawn; South Zone won on 1st innings
MA Chidambaram Stadium, Chennai

- South Zone won the toss and elected to bat.

=== Semi Final 1 ===
10–14 October 2013

North Zone	v	East Zone
591/8d (194 overs); Ian Dev Singh 145; Sunny Gupta 4/182		32/1 (14 overs); Pallavkumar Das 14; Harbhajan Singh 1/2

Match drawn; North Zone won by spin of coin
Jawaharlal Nehru Stadium, Kochi

- North Zone won the toss and elected to bat.

=== Semi Final 2 ===
10–14 October 2013

Central Zone	v	South Zone
209 (85.4 overs); Piyush Chawla 56; Abhimanyu Mithun 3/29		467/9d (162 overs); Abhinav Mukund 111; Piyush Chawla 4/159
220 (57.2 overs); Piyush Chawla 73; Pragyan Ojha 6/48

South Zone won by an innings and 38 runs
MA Chidambaram Stadium, Chennai

- Central Zone won the toss and elected to bat.

=== Final ===
17–21 October 2013
Scorecard

South Zone	v	North Zone
33/2 (10 overs); K. L. Rahul 9 Mohit Sharma 1/11

Match drawn; Trophy shared
Jawaharlal Nehru Stadium, Kochi

- South Zone won the toss and elected to bat.
