= 2009–10 Indian cricket season =

Cricket season review

Ranji Trophy
- Champions: Mumbai
- Runners-up: Karnataka
- Most runs: Manish Pandey (882)
- Most wickets: Dhawal Kulkarni (42); Ravindra Jadeja (42)

Vijay Hazare Trophy
- Champions: Tamil Nadu
- Runners-up: Bengal
- Most runs: Shreevats Goswami (568)
- Most wickets: Yo Mahesh (20)

Syed Mushtaq Ali Trophy
- Champions: Maharashtra
- Runners-up: Hyderabad
- Most runs: Parvez Aziz (287)
- Most wickets: Ganesh Gaikwad (11); Samad Fallah (11)

The 2009–10 Indian cricket season included the following series:

1. Australia in India (7 ODIs)
2. Sri Lanka in India (3 TESTS, 2 T20s, 5 ODIs)
3. South Africa in India (2 TESTS, 3 ODIs)

== Australia in India ==
Australia played seven ODIs in India from 25 October to 11 November 2009. The seven ODIs will complement the Test series that took place between the two nations in 2008 in India.

No.	Date	Home Captain	Away Captain	Venue	Result
ODI Series
ODI 2913	25 October	MS Dhoni	Ricky Ponting	Reliance Stadium, Vadodara	Australia by 4 runs
ODI 2915	28 October	MS Dhoni	Ricky Ponting	VCA Stadium, Nagpur	India by 99 runs
ODI 2918	31 October	MS Dhoni	Ricky Ponting	Feroz Shah Kotla, Delhi	India by 6 wickets
ODI 2919	2 November	MS Dhoni	Ricky Ponting	PCA Stadium, Mohali	Australia by 24 runs
ODI 2923	5 November	MS Dhoni	Ricky Ponting	Rajiv Gandhi Stadium, Hyderabad	Australia by 3 runs
ODI 2925	8 November	MS Dhoni	Ricky Ponting	Nehru Stadium, Guwahati	Australia by 6 wickets
ODI 2928a	11 November	MS Dhoni	Ricky Ponting	Brabourne Stadium, Mumbai	Match abandoned without a ball bowled

== Sri Lanka in India ==
The tour will begin with a practice match for the Sri Lankans against Indian Board President's XI starting November 11. The first test will begin on November 16 and the tour will conclude on December 27, with the last ODI. In all, the tour will include one First Class match, three Tests, two T20Is & five ODIs.

No.	Date	Home Captain	Away Captain	Venue	Result
Test Series
Test 1933	16–20 November	MS Dhoni	Kumar Sangakkara	Sardar Patel Stadium, Ahmedabad	Match Drawn
Test 1935	24–28 November	MS Dhoni	Kumar Sangakkara	Green Park, Kanpur	India by an inning and 144 runs
Test 1937	2–6 December	MS Dhoni	Kumar Sangakkara	Brabourne Stadium, Mumbai	India by an inning and 24 runs
T20I Series
T20l 126	9 December	MS Dhoni	Kumar Sangakkara	Vidarbha Cricket Association Stadium, Nagpur	Sri Lanka by 29 runs
T20l 127	12 December	MS Dhoni	Kumar Sangakkara	Punjab Cricket Association Stadium, Mohali	India by 6 wickets
ODI Series
ODI 2932	15 December	MS Dhoni	Kumar Sangakkara	Madhavrao Scindia Cricket Ground, Rajkot	India by 3 runs
ODI 2933	18 December	MS Dhoni	Kumar Sangakkara	Vidarbha Cricket Association Stadium, Nagpur	Sri Lanka by 3 wickets
ODI 2934	21 December	Virender Sehwag	Kumar Sangakkara	Barabati Stadium, Cuttack	India by 7 wickets
ODI 2935	24 December	Virender Sehwag	Kumar Sangakkara	Eden Gardens, Kolkata	India by 7 wickets
ODI 2936	27 December	MS Dhoni	Kumar Sangakkara	Feroz Shah Kotla, Delhi	Match Abandoned

== South Africa in India ==
South Africa played two Test and three ODIs.

No.	Date	Home Captain	Away Captain	Venue	Result
Test Series
Test 1951	6–10 February	MS Dhoni	Graeme Smith	VCA Stadium, Nagpur	South Africa won by an innings & 6 runs
Test 1952	14–18 February	MS Dhoni	Graeme Smith	Eden Gardens, Kolkata	India won by an innings & 57 runs
ODI Series
1st ODI	21 February	MS Dhoni	Graeme Smith	Sawai Mansingh Stadium, Jaipur	India won by 1 run
2nd ODI	24 February	MS Dhoni	Graeme Smith	Captain Roop Singh Stadium, Gwalior	India won by 153 runs
3rd ODI	27 February	MS Dhoni	Graeme Smith	Sardar Patel Stadium, Ahmedabad	South Africa won by 90 runs
