= J. D. Walsh =

J. D. Walsh may refer to:

- J. D. Walsh (actor), American actor
- J. D. Walsh (coach), American basketball coach

== See also ==
- Walsh (surname)
