= Hemant Kinikar =

Indian cricketer (born 1971)

Personal information
- Full name: Hemant Anand Kinikar
- Born: 6 December 1971 (age 54); Pune, Maharashtra, India
- Batting: Right-handed
- Bowling: Right-arm off break
- Role: Opening batsman

Domestic team information
- Years: Team
- 1992/93–2000/01: Maharashtra

Career statistics
Competition	FC	List A
Matches	37	24
Runs scored	2,371	562
Batting average	44.73	28.10
100s/50s	6/11	1/1
Top score	205*	139
Balls bowled	210	34
Wickets	2	0
Bowling average	49.00	–
5 wickets in innings	0	–
10 wickets in match	0	n/a
Best bowling	1/8	–
Catches/stumpings	48/–	10/–
- Source: ESPNcricinfo, 14 October 2017

Hemant Anand Kinikar (born 6 December 1971) is an Indian former first-class cricketer who played for Maharashtra. He became a cricket coach after his playing career.

== Career ==
Kinikar played as a right-handed opening batsman and occasional off break bowler. He made his first-class debut for Maharashtra against Saurashtra at the age of 20 during the 1992–93 Ranji Trophy and scored 110 and 47 in that match. He was the second highest run-scorer of the tournament finishing behind teammate Santosh Jedhe, with 754 runs in 8 matches, while Maharashtra reached the final of the tournament. He appeared in 37 first-class matches and 23 List A matches, including appearances for West Zone.

Kinikar took up cricket coaching after his retirement. In 2016, he was a coach at V. V. S. Laxman's academy in Hyderabad and head coach of the HK Bounce Cricket Academy in Pune.
