= Shekhar Gawli =

Indian cricketer (1975–2020)

Personal information
- Born: 6 August 1975
- Died: 1 September 2020 (aged 45)
- Source: Cricinfo, 3 September 2020

Shekhar Gawli (6 August 1975 – 1 September 2020) was an Indian cricketer who played in two first-class matches for Maharashtra. He died in September 2020, after falling into a gorge.

== See also ==
- List of Maharashtra cricketers
