= Pune Airport (disambiguation) =

Pune Airport is an airport north-east of Pune in Maharashtra, India.

Pune Airport may also refer to:

- New Pune Airport, a proposed airport.

== See also ==
- NDA Gliderdrome
- Lohegaon Air Force Station
- Hadapsar Airport
