= Ramesh Kadam =

Ramesh Kadam may refer to:

- Ramesh Kadam (cricketer)
- Ramesh Kadam (politician)
