= 2011–12 Indian cricket season =

2011–12 Indian Cricket Season
Ranji Trophy
- Champions: Rajasthan
- Runners-up: Tamil Nadu

Vijay Hazare Trophy
- Champions: Bengal
- Runners-up: Mumbai

Syed Mushtaq Ali Trophy
- Champions: Baroda
- Runners-up: Punjab

The 2011–12 Indian cricket season was from late September 2011 to March 2012.

== Overview ==
International tours
Start date	Against	Results [Matches]		
Start date	Against	Test	ODI	T20I
8 October 2011	England		5–0 [5]	0–1 [1]
6 November 2011	(Cricket West Indies) West Indies	2–0 [3]	4–1 [5]	
10 March 2012	Australia		0–3 [3]	1–4 [5]
International tournaments
Start date	Tournament		Winners	
19 September 2011	2011 Champions League Twenty20		Mumbai Indians	
27 September 2011	India Under-19 Quadrangular Series		India	
Domestic Tournament
Start date	Tournament		Winners	
1 September 2011	BCCI Corporate Trophy		State Bank of Hyderabad	
1 October 2011	Irani Cup		Rest of India	
10 October 2011	NKP Salve Challenger Trophy		India Red & Green	
16 October 2011	Syed Mushtaq Ali Trophy		Baroda	
3 November 2011	Ranji Trophy		Rajasthan	
	Women's Challenger Trophy		India Red	
27 January 2012	Duleep Trophy		East Zone	
20 February 2012	Vijay Hazare Trophy		Bengal	
16 March 2012	Deodhar Trophy		West Zone	
