= 2011–12 Syed Mushtaq Ali Trophy =

Indian cricket tournament

- Dates: 16 October 2011 – 27 March 2012
- Administrator(s): BCCI
- Cricket format: T20
- Tournament format(s): Round robin, then knockout
- Champions: Baroda (1st title)
- Participants: 27
- Matches: 69
- Most runs: Mandeep Singh (268) (Punjab)
- Most wickets: Murtuja Vahora (13) (Baroda)

The 2011–12 Syed Mushtaq Ali Trophy was the fourth edition of the Syed Mushtaq Ali Trophy, an annual Twenty20 tournament in India. It was contested by all 27 Ranji Trophy teams. Baroda emerged as the victor, earning their first title.

== Group stage ==
=== East Zone ===
Team	Pld	W	L	T	NR	Pts	NRR
Bengal	4	3	0	0	1	14	2.106
Assam	4	2	1	0	1	10	0.642
Jharkhand	4	1	1	0	2	8	-0.188
Orissa	4	1	2	0	1	6	-0.540
Tripura	4	0	3	0	1	2	-2.310

=== South Zone ===
Team	Pld	W	L	T	NR	Pts	NRR
Karnataka (Note: Head-to-head points: Karnataka 4, Tamil Nadu 0)	5	4	1	0	0	16	1.155
Tamil Nadu	5	4	1	0	0	16	1.432
Kerala	5	2	2	0	1	10	0.169
Hyderabad	5	2	3	0	0	8	-0.907
Andhra	5	1	3	0	1	6	-1.088
Goa	5	1	4	0	0	4	-0.931

=== North Zone ===
Team	Pld	W	L	T	NR	Pts	NRR
Punjab (Note: Head-to-head points: Punjab 4, Delhi 0)	5	4	1	0	0	16	0.897
Delhi	5	4	1	0	0	16	0.452
Haryana (Note: Head-to-head points: Haryana 4, Services 0)	5	3	2	0	0	12	0.003
Services	5	3	2	0	0	12	-0.193
Himachal Pradesh	5	1	4	0	0	4	-0.465
Jammu and Kashmir	5	0	5	0	0	0	-0.681

=== Central Zone ===
Team	Pld	W	L	T	NR	Pts	NRR
Madhya Pradesh	4	4	0	0	0	16	1.290
Railways	4	3	1	0	0	12	0.802
Uttar Pradesh	4	2	2	0	0	8	-0.018
Rajasthan	4	1	3	0	0	4	-0.764
Vidarbha	4	0	4	0	0	0	-1.276

=== West Zone ===
Team	Pld	W	L	T	NR	Pts	NRR
Mumbai	4	3	1	0	0	12	2.178
Baroda	4	3	1	0	0	12	1.088
Saurashtra	4	3	1	0	0	12	0.280
Maharashtra	4	1	3	0	0	4	-2.050
Gujarat	4	0	4	0	0	0	-1.501

== Knockout stage ==
Pre-Quarter-finals
23 Mar 2012
Punjab	118/1 (11 ov)
Assam	116/9 (20 ov)
23 Mar 2012
Karnataka	167/6 (20 ov) & 7/1
Baroda (S)	167/9 (20 ov) & 22/0

Quarter-finals
25 Mar 2012
Madhya Pradesh	120/9 (20 ov)
Punjab	123/3 (18 ov)
24 Mar 2012
Mumbai	193/9 (20 ov)
Tamil Nadu	162 (18.5 ov)
24 Mar 2012
Delhi	180/6 (20 ov)
Railways	179/9 (20 ov)
25 Mar 2012
Bengal	111/7 (20 ov)
Baroda	114/6 (19.2 ov)

Semi-finals
26 Mar 2012
Punjab	124/5 (19 ov)
Mumbai	122/9 (20 ov)
26 Mar 2012
Delhi	169/9 (20 ov)
Baroda	173/3 (17.1 ov)

Finals
27 Mar 2012
Punjab	141/8 (20 ov)
Baroda	149/6 (20 ov)

(S) - Baroda qualified for Quarter-finals by winning the Super Over against Karnataka after the Pre-quarter-finals ended in a tie.

=== Final ===
27 March 2012
Scorecard

Baroda; 149/6 (20 Overs)	v	Punjab; 141/8 (20 Overs)
Pinal Shah 39 (28); Bipul Sharma 2/15 (3 Overs)		Mandeep Singh 40 (31); Munaf Patel 2/21 (4 Overs)

Baroda won by 8 runs
Brabourne Stadium, Mumbai
Umpires: Anil Chaudhary and Suresh Shastri
Player of the match: Irfan Pathan (Baroda)

- Baroda won the toss and elected to bat first.
