= Wayangankar =

Wayangankar (Marathi: वायंगणकर) is a Marathi surname. Notable people with the surname include:

- Srinivas Wayangankar (born 1946), Indian cricketer
- Tejaswi Prakash Wayangankar (born 1992), Indian television actress.
