= Hemant Talwalkar =

Indian cricketer (1954–2016)

Hemant Sharad Talwalkar
Personal information
- Full name: Hemant Sharad Talwakar
- Born: 6 March 1954; Poona, India
- Died: 20 November 2016 (aged 62); Detroit, Michigan, United States
- Source: ESPNcricinfo, 5 January 2017

Hemant Talwalkar (6 March 1954 – 20 November 2016) was an Indian. He is a son of famous Marathi comic actor Mr, Sharad Talwakar . who is a legend of marathi cinema along with Raja Gosavi. cricketer. He played ten first-class matches for Maharashtra between 1977/78 and 1984/85.

== See also ==
- List of Maharashtra cricketers
