= Arjunrao Bharbhare =

Indian cricketer

Arjunrao Narayanrao Bharbhare (born 16 July 1924) was an Indian cricketer. He was a right-handed batsman and right-arm medium-pace bowler who played for Maharashtra. He was born in Bhinga.

Bharbhare made a single first-class appearance for the side, during the 1954–55 season, against Saurashtra. He scored 5 runs in the only innings in which he batted.

Bharbhare bowled 31 overs in the match, taking two wickets and conceding 48 runs.
