= Madhav Tamhankar =

Indian cricketer (born 1938)

Madhav Tamhankar (born 29 March 1938) is an Indian former cricketer. He was a right-handed batsman who played for Maharashtra. He was born in Poona.

Tamhankar made a single first-class appearance for the side, during the 1961–62 season, against Gujarat. From the lower order, he scored a single run in the only innings in which he batted.
