= Rao Bhosle =

Indian cricketer

Personal information
- Full name: Rao Saheb Bhosle
- Born: 4 April 1932 (age 94); Kolhapur, Maharashtra, British India
- Batting: Right-handed
- Bowling: Right-arm off break Right-arm medium

Domestic team information
- Years: Team
- 1952/53–1960/61: Maharashtra
- 1963: Cumberland

Career statistics
Competition	First-class
Matches	21
Runs scored	787
Batting average	30.26
100s/50s	–/5
Top score	89
Balls bowled	3,398
Wickets	31
Bowling average	46.74
5 wickets in innings	–
10 wickets in match	–
Best bowling	4/35
Catches/stumpings	11/–
- Source: Cricinfo, 2 January 2019

Rao Saheb Bhosle (born 4 April 1932) is a former Indian first-class cricketer.

Born at Kolhapur in Maharashtra, Bhosle made his debut in first-class cricket for Maharashtra in the 1952–53 Ranji Trophy against Gujarat at Ahmedabad. He played for Maharashtra regularly during the 1950s, making 21 first-class appearances to 1960. He scored a total of 787 runs, with an average of 30.26, making five half centuries with a highest score of 89. Bowling a mixture of right-arm off break and medium pace, Bhosle took 31 wickets at a bowling average of 46.74, with best figures of 4/35. He later played minor counties cricket in England for Cumberland in 1963, making five appearances.
