= Jacob Reuben =

Indian cricketer

Jacob Reuben (born 28 February 1931) was an Indian cricketer. He was a right-handed batsman and wicket-keeper who played for Maharashtra. He was born in Ahmednagar.

Reuben made a single first-class appearance for the side, during the 1952–53 season, against Holkar. From the tailend, he scored 1 not out in each innings in which he batted.

Reuben took two catches from behind the stumps, those of Hiralal Gaekwad and Narayan Nivsarkar.
