= 1978–79 Duleep Trophy =

- Dates: 20 October 1978 – 18 March 1979
- Administrator(s): BCCI
- Cricket format: First-class cricket
- Tournament format(s): Knockout
- Champions: North Zone (2nd title)
- Participants: 5
- Matches: 4
- Most runs: Surinder Khanna (NZ) (244)
- Most wickets: Dhiraj Parsana (WZ) (17)

The 1978–79 Duleep Trophy was the 18th season of the Duleep Trophy, a first-class cricket tournament contested by five zonal teams of India: Central Zone, East Zone, North Zone, South Zone and West Zone.

North Zone won the final against West Zone on first innings lead.

== Results ==
Quarterfinal
Central Zone	W
South Zone

Semifinals
West Zone	W
Central Zone
East Zone
North Zone	W

Final
West Zone
North Zone	FIL

=== Final ===
15–18 March 1979
Scorecard

North Zone	v	West Zone
417 (157.2 overs); Yashpal Sharma 89; Rajendra Jadeja 3/72		277 (86.1 overs); Sunil Gavaskar 130*; Kapil Dev 7/65
263/8 dec (123 overs); Mohinder Amarnath 65*; Dhiraj Parsana 5/65		102/2 (36 overs); Dilip Vengsarkar 56*; Yashpal Sharma 1/28

Match drawn; North Zone won on first innings lead
Feroz Shah Kotla Ground, Delhi

- West Zone won the toss and elected to field.
