= Riaz Bagwan =

Indian cricketer

Riaz Bagwan (born 16 June 1961) was an Indian cricketer. He was a right-handed batsman and right-arm medium-pace bowler who played for Maharashtra. He was born in Bombay. Selector of the Maharashtra Cricket Association

Bagwan, who had previously played for Maharashtra Schools and West Zone Schools in miscellaneous matches, made a single first-class appearance, during the 1983–84 season, against Saurashtra. Bagwan did not bat during the match, but bowled 5 overs, conceding 28 runs.
