= Prakashi Malve =

Indian cricketer (born 1948)

Prakashi Malve (born 13 January 1948) was an Indian cricketer. He was a right-handed batsman and right-arm fast bowler who played for Maharashtra. He was born in Nasik.

Malve made a single first-class appearance for the side, during the 1971–72 season, against Saurashtra. He did not bat in either innings in the match.

He bowled 4 overs in the match, conceding 12 runs.
