= Kedar Bhave =

Indian cricketer (born 1959)

Kedar Bhave (born 18 March 1959) is an Indian cricketer. He was a left-handed batsman and left-arm slow bowler who played for Maharashtra. He was born in Poona.

Bhave made his cricketing debut in the CK Nayudu Trophy competition of 1979–80, playing two matches for Maharashtra Under-22s, scoring 9 runs. He played a single further match in the competition.

Bhave made a single first-class appearance for Maharashtra, during the 1987–88 season, against Gujarat. In the only innings in which he batted, he scored a duck.

He bowled 18 overs in the match, conceding 45 runs.

Bhave's brother, Surendra, played for Maharashtra for 15 years.
