= Mangesh Vaidya =

Indian cricketer

Mangesh Vaidya (born 4 August 1971), is a former Indian cricketer. He was a right-handed batsman and right-arm off-break bowler who played for Maharashtra. He was born in Poona.

Vaidya made his cricketing debut for Maharashtra Under-17s in the 1986–87 Vijay Hazare Trophy, top-scoring in the first innings in which he played in the competition. In the following season, he moved up to the Under-19s team, but after 1989, took four years out of the game.

Upon his return in December 1993, Vaidya played three matches in the 1993–94 One-Day Ranji Trophy competition, top-scoring with 45 runs in the third match.

Vaidya took another break of four years before he made his only first-class appearance, in the 1997-98 Ranji Trophy against Baroda. Vaidya scored 9 runs in the first innings in which he batted, and 4 runs in the second, in a match which Maharashtra won by a comfortable margin.

He would make a final List A appearance in the One-Day competition in the same season.
