= Poona Gymkhana Ground =

Multi purpose stadium in Pune, Maharashtra, India

- Full name: Poona Gymkhana Ground
- Location: Pune, Maharashtra
- Owner: Poona Gymkhana
- Operator: Poona Gymkhana
- Capacity: n/a

Construction
- Groundbreaking: 1892
- Opened: 1892

Website
- Cricinfo

Poona Gymkhana Ground is a multi purpose stadium in Pune, Maharashtra. The ground is mainly used for organizing matches of football, cricket and other sports. The ground has the India's second first-class match played in 1892.

The ground hosted two first-class matches in 1892 when Europeans cricket team played against Parsees cricket team. The ground also hosted 1939/40 Ranji Trophy Final when Maharashtra cricket team played against United Provinces cricket team. Since then the stadium has hosted non-first-class matches.
