= Rajendrasinh Jadeja =

Indian cricketer, coach, and referee (1955–2021)

Personal information
- Born: 29 November 1955; Palanpur, Bombay State, India
- Died: 16 May 2021 (aged 65); Jamnagar, Gujarat, India
- Role: all-rounder

Domestic team information
- Years: Team
- Saurashtra cricket team
- West Zone cricket team
- Mumbai cricket team

Career statistics
Competition	FC	LA
Matches	50	11
Runs scored	1536	104
Batting average	24.38	34.66
100s/50s	0/11	0/0
Top score	97	48*
Balls bowled
Wickets	134	14
Bowling average	26.24	26.64
5 wickets in innings	5	0
10 wickets in match	0	n/a
Best bowling	7/58	3/39
Catches/stumpings	12/0	3/0
- Source: Cricinfo, 17 May 2021

Rajendrasinh Jadeja, also spelt as Rajendra Raisinh Jadeja aka Rajendra Jadeja (29 November 1955 – 16 May 2021), was an Indian cricketer, coach and former BCCI official referee. He played first-class cricket representing Saurashtra, West Zone and Mumbai. He featured in 50 first-class matches and in 11 List A matches.

== Playing career ==
Jadeja began playing cricket during his school days at Rajkumar College, Rajkot. He captained Siddharth College cricket team at university level competitions. He made his first-class debut during the 1974–75 Ranji Trophy season playing for Saurashtra. He soon became a prominent member of the Saurashtra team in first-class cricket and also led the pace attack for Saurashtra from the front for over a decade especially in first-class matches. In between, he also turned up for Bombay cricket team in 2 first-class seasons in 1978-79 and 1979-80 being a regular member of the side. He was also part of the West Zone squad which emerged as runners-up to North Zone in the 1978–79 Duleep Trophy final.

Jadeja was also selected to represent the West Zone and Indian Universities Under 22 team in a friendly home match against touring Marylebone Cricket Club during 1976-77 season. He also eventually went onto play alongside veteran former Indian captain Dilip Vengsarkar during that match against MCC. In addition, Jadeja also played for Nirlon in the Times Shield.

He was hailed as one of the finest right arm medium pacers in domestic circuit during his playing days as well as regarded as a remarkable allrounder as he ended up his first-class career with scoring 1536 runs and capturing 134 wickets. Between 1974-75 to 1986-87, Jadeja appeared in 13 first-class seasons before retiring from professional cricket.

Jadeja played county and league cricket in England between 1980 and 1995. He was a member of Marylebone Cricket Club.

== Officiating and coaching career ==
Jadeja was later appointed an official referee by the Board of Control for Cricket in India and he officiated as a referee in 53 first-class matches, 18 List A matches and 34 T20 matches. He was also one of the referees during the 2015 Indian Premier League, where he officiated in few group stage matches. His last match as referee came on 7 November 2015 during a first-class match between Jharkhand and Jammu & Kashmir in the Ranji Trophy.

He then became a coach, selector and team manager of the Saurashtra Cricket Association. He also coached the Sorath Lions at the inaugural edition of the Saurashtra Premier League in 2019 where the team emerged as winners. His final coaching stint was with Saurashtra's Under 23 during 2019-20 season.

== Personal life and death ==
Jadeja was well known for his trademark moustache. His brother Dharmaraj Raisinh Jadeja also played first-class cricket for Saurashtra.

He died on 16 May 2021 at the age of 65 in Jamnagar, Gujarat, after contracting COVID-19.

== See also ==
- List of Saurashtra cricketers
- List of Mumbai cricketers
- List of West Zone cricketers
