= Ashish Suryawanshi =

Indian cricketer

Ashish Suryawanshi (born 17 September 1990) was an Indian cricketer. He was a right-handed batsman and right-arm off-break bowler who played for Maharashtra. He was born in Latur.

Suryawanshi, who has played for the Under-15, Under-17, and Under-19 teams for Maharashtra, made his only Twenty20 appearance during the 2006–07 season, against Baroda, scoring 1 not out from the tailend, and conceding figures of 0-33 from four overs bowling.

Suryawanshi's only first-class appearance came the following season, against Tamil Nadu, against whom he scored 46 runs in the only innings in which he batted.
