= Prakash Rajguru =

Indian cricketer

Personal information
- Born: 24 December 1939; Poona, India
- Died: 23 June 2006 (aged 66); India
- Batting: Right-handed
- Bowling: Right-arm off-break
- Role: All-rounder

Domestic team information
- Years: Team
- 1965/66: Maharashtra

Career statistics
Competition	First-class
Matches	1
Runs scored	25
Batting average	25.00
100s/50s	0/0
Top score	21
Catches/stumpings	0/–
- Source: Cricinfo, 15 May 2024

Prakash Rajguru (24 December 1939 – 23 June 2006) was an Indian cricketer. He was a right-handed batsman and right-arm off-break bowler who played for Maharashtra. He was born in Poona and died in India.

Rajguru made his cricketing debut for Maharashtra Schools during the 1956-57 Cooch Behar Trophy season - later playing for the victorious West Zone Schools team during the same campaign.

Rajguru made three appearances for Poona University in the Rohinton Baria Trophy between January and December 1963.

Rajguru's only first-class appearance came during the 1965–66 season, against Saurashtra. He scored 4 runs in the first innings in which he batted, and 21 runs in the second, as Maharashtra won the match by a comfortable margin.
