= Enduro3 =

India's first and only adventure race

Enduro3 is India's first and only adventure race. It is organized by an NEF (National Education Foundation) an organization based in Pune. Enduro3 is an adventure inspiring ascent of team spirit, creating youthfulness in every age and exposing the participants to the beauty of the Western Ghats

NECC-NEF Enduro3 has the distinction of being India's first and only adventure race. It has been attracting increasing participation across varied age groups since its inception in 2003. From an initial registration of 48 teams the participation has grown to 200 teams of adventure and nature lovers coming together from Metros and small towns. In just a decade of the event, NEF Enduro3 has left an indelible footprint and created an incomparable experience for adventure lovers.

The team receives support from the National Egg Coordination Committee (NECC) and Vencobb.

Each team must have at least one female member.

== Categories ==
The race is conducted once a year and is held in different categories. Some of the categories are

- Open
- IT (Information Technology) (All members need to be employed in the IT industry)
- Corporate (All members need to be employed in the corporate world)
- Amateur
- Collegian (All members need to be College going)
- Junior (All members need to be School going)
- 40+ (All members need to be of the age 40 and above)
- Doctors (All members need to be a doctor)
- Media (All members need to be working with the media industry)
- Teachers (All members need to be a Teacher)
- Family (All members should belong to the same family)

Each of the above categories is further divided into the following two categories:

- Mixed: team has Male and Female members
- All female: team has only female members

Each team has three members, of which one must be female.

== Activities ==
The race comprises a mix of the following activities:

- Trekking: The distance and route varies as per the category.
- Cycling: The distance and route varies as per the category.
- River crossing: This is usually done at night and at the end of it there are usually a few hours of resting time.
- Rappelling: This activity is only for OPEN and Amateur category.
- Paddling: This activity should be done by all the three members of the team.
- Navigation
- Kayaking
