= Milind Gunjal =

Indian former first-class cricketer (born 1959)

Personal information
- Full name: Milind Dattatraya Gunjal
- Born: 4 April 1959 (age 67); Pune, Maharashtra, India
- Batting: Right-handed
- Bowling: Leg break
- Role: Batsman

Domestic team information
- Years: Team
- 1978/79–1992/93: Maharashtra

Career statistics
Competition	FC	List A
Matches	88	21
Runs scored	5,427	459
Batting average	47.19	24.15
100s/50s	14/27	1/1
Top score	204	122*
Balls bowled	791	24
Wickets	7	0
Bowling average	84.42	–
5 wickets in innings	0	–
10 wickets in match	0	n/a
Best bowling	2/21	–
Catches/stumpings	89/1	6/0
- Source: ESPNcricinfo, 18 June 2016

Milind Dattatraya Gunjal (born 4 April 1959) is an Indian former first-class cricketer who played for Maharashtra. He worked as a match referee and coach after retiring as a cricketer.

== Life and career ==
Gunjal made his first-class debut at the age of 19, playing as the captain of India Under-22s against the visiting West Indies team in 1978. He soon established himself in the middle-order of Maharashtra as a prolific run-scorer. Although he did not play international cricket, he was part of the West Zone team that played against the visiting Australian, Pakistani and West Indian teams, as well as the "Young India" team that toured Zimbabwe in 1984. He was the third-highest run-scorer at the 1985–86 Ranji Trophy with 677 runs in 6 matches at an average of 84.62, only behind Delhi batsmen Kirti Azad and Raman Lamba. There was some expectation that Gunjal could be picked for the Indian team on its England tour in 1986, but he was not selected. He continued to play for Maharashtra until the 1992–93 Ranji Trophy, in which they finished runners-up, with the final against Punjab being his last first-class appearance. Gunjal also captained Maharashtra in several matches during his 15-season career, during which he played 88 first-class and 21 List A matches.

After retirement, Gunjal worked as a match referee in domestic cricket matches. He also trained cricketers at his cricket academy. He has been the coach of batsman Dheeraj Jadhav, who went on to play more than 100 first-class matches, since Jadhav's childhood.
