= Mahendra Gokhale =

Indian cricketer

Mahendra Gokhale (born 6 October 1967) was an Indian cricketer. He was a right-handed batsman and a right-arm off-break bowler who played for Maharashtra. He was born in Pune.

Gokhale made a single first-class appearance for the side, during the 1998–99 season, against Orissa. In the only innings in which he batted, he scored 8 not out.

Gokhale bowled 20 overs in the match, conceding 67 runs and taking 8 wickets.

He was a fitness trainer for the pro kabaddi team puneri paltan. He was also the fitness trainer of Mumbai Indians in the first season of 2008–09.
