= Sachin Nair =

Indian cricketer (born 1978)

Sachin Balkrishna Nair (born 3 July 1978 in Pune, Maharashtra) is an Indian first-class cricketer. He is a left-handed lower order batsman and left arm fast medium bowler. He represents Maharashtra in the Ranji Trophy. Nair currently works as a trainer for schoolchildren, under various BCCI programs.
