= Sunil Jadhav =

Indian body builder and cricketer

Sunit Jadhav (born 21 December 1992) is an Indian body builder. He is also called as Abhishek mahakal who played for Spartans gym team. He was born in Mumbai.

Having played in the victorious Maharashtra Under-15 team in the 2007-08 Polly Umrigar Trophy, he made a single first-class appearance for the senior side, during the 2007–08 season, against Karnataka.

== Competition record ==
- Sunit is a professional bodybuilder from Maharashtra.
- He won the federation cup overall championship in 2014.
- He won Mumbai Shree 2014.
- He won Maharashtra Shree in 2014,2015 and 2016.
- He won Mr.Dubai International in 2016.
- He won Mr.India 2017 title in March 2017.
- He also won Mr.Asia title in 2018.
- He won GOLD in amateur olympia 2021.
- He got pro card in sheru classic 2021
