= Arvind Mehendale =

Indian cricketer

Arvind Mehendale (born 11 September 1943) is an Indian cricketer. He was a right-handed batsman and right-arm off-break bowler who played for Maharashtra. He was born in Poona.

Mehendale made a single first-class appearance for the side, during the 1974–75 season, against Gujarat. From the tailend, he scored 3 not out in the first innings in which he batted, and 1 not out in the second.

Mehendale bowled 7 overs in the match, conceding 8 runs.

Between 1997 and 2002, Mehendale refereed 7 first-class matches.
