= Chandrakant Raut =

Indian cricketer (born 1945)

Chandrakant Raut (born 25 August 1945) was an Indian cricketer. He was a right-handed batsman and right-arm medium-fast bowler who played for Maharashtra. He was born in Pune.

Raut made a single first-class appearance for the team, during the 1972–73 season, against Saurashtra. In the only innings in which he batted, he scored 9 runs.

Raut bowled 20.2 overs in the match, taking 4 wickets and conceding 79 runs.
