= Raosaheb Nimbalkar =

Indian cricketer (1915–1965)

Personal information
- Full name: Raosaheb Babasaheb Nimbalkar
- Born: 1 December 1915; Kolhapur, Maharashtra, British India
- Died: 1 June 1965 (aged 49); Jalna, Maharashtra, India
- Batting: Right-handed
- Bowling: Right-arm leg spin
- Role: Wicket-keeper
- Relatives: B. B. Nimbalkar (brother), S. B. Nimbalkar (nephew)

Domestic team information
- Years: Team
- 1934–1941: Maharashtra
- 1938–1952: Baroda
- 1938: Hindus

Career statistics
Competition	First-class
Matches	63
Runs scored	2,687
Batting average	30.19
100s/50s	4/15
Top score	132
Balls bowled	252
Wickets	3
Bowling average	59.66
5 wickets in innings	0
10 wickets in match	0
Best bowling	1/8
Catches/stumpings	84/41
- Source: CricketArchive, 5 June 2014

Raosaheb Babasaheb Nimbalkar (1 December 1915 – 1 June 1965) was an Indian first-class cricketer. He was a right-handed batsman and a wicket-keeper who occasionally bowled leg breaks. He played from 1934 to 1953, initially for Maharashtra and then for Baroda. Nimbalkar never played Test cricket but he travelled to England in 1946 as India's reserve wicketkeeper, understudying Dattaram Hindlekar. Nimbalkar was born at Kolhapur, Maharashtra and died at Jalna, Maharashtra. He was the elder brother of fellow Indian first-class cricketer B. B. Nimbalkar.

Nimbalkar made 63 first-class appearances, scoring 2,687 runs at an average of 30.19, with a highest innings of 132, one of his four centuries. As a wicket-keeper, he held 84 catches and completed 41 stumpings, achieving nearly two dismissals per match.

== Bibliography ==
- Caple, S. Canynge (1959). England versus India: 1886 – 1959. Worcester: Littlebury & Co. Ltd. ASIN B001EN6QX2. OCLC 451210.
