= Nikhil Naik =

Indian cricketer (born 1994)

Personal information
- Full name: Nikhil Shankar Naik
- Born: 9 November 1994 (age 32); Sawantwadi, Maharashtra, India
- Batting: Right-handed
- Role: Wicket-keeper

Domestic team information
- Years: Team
- 2013–present: Maharashtra
- 2016: Kings XI Punjab
- 2019–2020: Kolkata Knight Riders

Career statistics
Competition	FC	LA	T20
Matches	5	37	61
Runs scored	133	968	970
Batting average	22.16	37.23	27.71
100s/50s	0/0	0/7	0/6
Top score	48	82*	95*
Catches/stumpings	14/4	36/6	34/9
- Source: ESPNcricinfo, 27 May 2024

Nikhil Shankar Naik (born 9 November 1994) is an Indian cricketer who plays for Maharashtra cricket team. He is a right-handed batsman and occasional wicket-keeper. He made his List A debut on 27 February 2014, for Maharashtra in the 2013–14 Vijay Hazare Trophy. In 2015, he was signed up by the Indian Premier League franchise Kings XI Punjab for Rs. 30 lakh.

In December 2018, he was bought by the Kolkata Knight Riders in the player auction for the 2019 Indian Premier League. He made his first-class debut for Maharashtra in the 2018–19 Ranji Trophy on 7 January 2019. During a match in the 2019 season of the Syed Mushtaq Ali Trophy, he smashed five sixes in an over against Railways at the Holkar Stadium. He was released by the Kolkata Knight Riders ahead of the 2020 IPL auction. In the 2020 IPL auction, he was bought by the Kolkata Knight Riders ahead of the 2020 Indian Premier League.
