= Nehru Stadium, Pune =

Sports stadium in Pune, Maharashtra

Jawaharlal Nehru Stadium, Pune
- Nehru Stadium
- Interactive map of Jawaharlal Nehru Stadium, Pune

Ground information
- Location: Swargate, Shukrawar Peth, Pune – 411002
- Country: India
- Coordinates: 18°30′08″N 73°51′20″E
- Establishment: 1969
- Capacity: 27,000
- End names
- Tilak Road End; Laxmi Road End

International information
- First men's ODI: 5 December 1984: India v England
- Last men's ODI: 3 November 2005: India v Sri Lanka
- First women's ODI: 8 February 1984: India v Australia
- Last women's ODI: 24 January 2002: India v England

Team information
Maharashtra	(1969 – present)
West Zone	(1975–2001)
- As of 10 December 2019

Nehru Stadium, formerly known as Club of Maharashtra Ground, is a multi-purpose stadium in Pune, India. It is mainly used for cricket matches. The stadium was built in 1969 and holds a capacity of 27,000.

The ground is home to Maharashtra Cricket Team who represent the state of Maharashtra in Ranji Trophy.

== International cricket ==
The stadium has hosted 11 One Day International matches including two in the Cricket World Cup (1987 & 1996), 4 WODI till date. The first ever ODI played on this ground was between India and England in 1984. The ground is yet to host a test match.

One of cricket's biggest upsets occurred on this very ground when Kenya beat West Indies in a low scoring encounter in the 1996 Cricket World Cup.

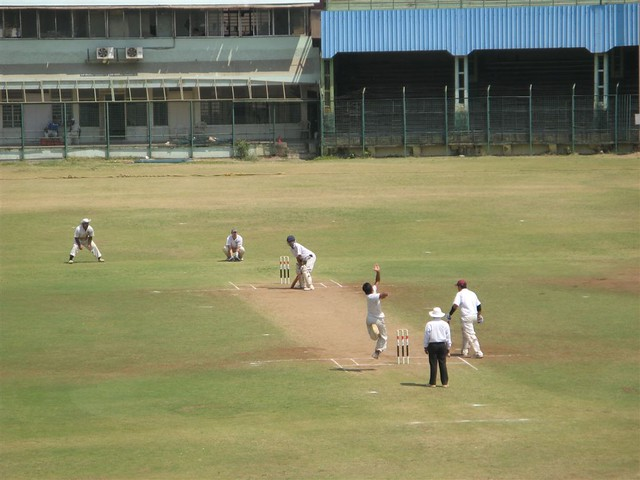
A still from final between Infosys & Cognizant Tech at Nehru Stadium

List of ODIs

Date	Team 1	Team 2	Results	Scorecard
5 December 1984	India	England	England won by 4 wickets	Scorecard
22 March 1987	India	Pakistan	Pakistan won by 6 wickets	Scorecard
30 October 1987	England	Sri Lanka	England won by 8 wickets	Scorecard
5 December 1990	India	Sri Lanka	India won by 6 wickets	Scorecard
25 March 1993	India	Zimbabwe	India won by 8 wickets	Scorecard
24 November 1995	India	New Zealand	India won by 5 wickets	Scorecard
29 February 1996	Kenya	West Indies	Kenya won by 73 runs	Scorecard
30 March 1999	India	Sri Lanka	India won by 51 runs	Scorecard
28 March 2001	India	Australia	Australia won by 8 wickets	Scorecard
3 November 2003	Australia	New Zealand	Australia won by 2 wickets	Scorecard
3 November 2005	India	Sri Lanka	India won by 4 wickets	Scorecard

List of WODIs

Date	Team 1	Team 2	Results	Scorecard
8 February 1984	India	Australia	AUS Women won by 5 wickets (with 4 balls remaining)	Scorecard
14 December 1997	Ireland	South Africa	SA Women won by 9 wickets (with 133 balls remaining)	Scorecard
16 December 1997	England	Ireland	ENG Women won by 208 runs	Scorecard
24 January 2002	India	England	IND Women won by 6 wickets (with 20 balls remaining)	Scorecard

== Cricket World Cup ==
This stadium has hosted One Day International (ODI) matches when India hosted the Cricket World Cup.

1. 1987 Cricket World Cup
2. 1996 Cricket World Cup

1987 Cricket World Cup

- Sri Lanka v/s England:

30 October 1987
Scorecard

Sri Lanka; 218/7 (50 overs)	v	England; 219/2 (41.2 overs)

England won by 8 wickets
Nehru Stadium, Pune, India

1996 Cricket World Cup

- Kenya v/s West Indies:

29 February
(scorecard)

Kenya; 166 (49.3 overs)	v	West Indies; 93 (35.2 overs)
Steve Tikolo 29 (50); Courtney Walsh 3/46 (9 overs)		Shivnarine Chanderpaul 19 (48); Maurice Odumbe 3/15 (10 overs)

Kenya won by 73 runs
Nehru Stadium, Pune, India
Umpires: Khizer Hayat & V.K. Ramaswamy
Player of the match: Maurice Odumbe (Kenya)

== List of centuries ==
=== Key ===
- * denotes that the batsman was not out.
- Inns. denotes the number of the innings in the match.
- Balls denotes the number of balls faced in an innings.
- NR denotes that the number of balls was not recorded.
- Parentheses next to the player's score denotes his century number at Edgbaston.
- The column title Date refers to the date the match started.
- The column title Result refers to the player's team result

=== One Day Internationals ===
No.	Score	Player	Team	Balls	Inns.	Opposing team	Date	Result
1	105	Dilip Vengsarkar	India	124	1	England	5 December 1988	Lost
2	115*	Mike Gatting	England	135	2	India	5 December 1988	Won
3	103	Chris Cairns	New Zealand	87	1	India	24 November 1995	Lost
4	103*	Ajay Jadeja	India	102	1	Sri Lanka	30 March 1999	Won
5	100	Hemang Badani	India	98	1	Australia	28 March 2001	Lost
6	133*	Mark Waugh	Australia	138	2	India	28 March 2001	Won

== List of Five Wicket Hauls ==
=== Key ===
Symbol	Meaning
†	The bowler was man of the match
‡	10 or more wickets taken in the match
§	One of two five-wicket hauls by the bowler in the match
Date	Day the Test started or ODI was held
Inn	Innings in which five-wicket haul was taken
Overs	Number of overs bowled.
Runs	Number of runs conceded
Wkts	Number of wickets taken
Econ	Runs conceded per over
Batsmen	Batsmen whose wickets were taken
Drawn	The match was drawn.

=== One Day Internationals ===
No.	Bowler	Date	Team	Opposing team	Inn	Overs	Runs	Wkts	Econ	Batsmen	Result
1	Brad Williams	3 November 2003	Australia	New Zealand	1	10	53	5	5.3	Chris Nevin; Lou Vincent; Scott Styris; Craig McMillan; Chris Harris	Won
2	Ajit Agarkar	5 November 2005	India	Sri Lanka	1	9.5	44	5	4.47	Kumar Sangakkara; Sanath Jayasuriya; Farveez Maharoof; Muttiah Muralitharan; Chaminda Vaas	Won

The leading run scorers here have been Mike Gatting- 161 runs, Mark Waugh- 133 runs and Chris Cairns- 130 runs. The leading wicket takers here have been Ajit Agarkar- 8 wickets, Kapil Dev, Javagal Srinath and Brad Williams- 5 wickets.
