= Mukund Sathe =

Indian cricketer (1937–2015)

Mukund Sathe (3 March 1937 – 27 November 2015) was an Indian cricketer. He was a right-handed batsman and right-arm medium-fast bowler who played for Maharashtra. He was born in Poona, now Pune.

Sathe made a single first-class appearance for the side, during the 1957 season, against Gujarat. From the lower order, he scored a duck in the only innings in which he batted.

He bowled 6 overs in the match, conceding only 12 runs.
