= Nikhil Paradkar =

Indian cricketer (born 1987)

Personal information
- Full name: Nikhil Sandesh Paradkar
- Born: 24 September 1987 (age 39); Daund, Maharashtra, India
- Source: ESPNcricinfo, 4 January 2019

Nikhil Paradkar (born 24 September 1987) is an Indian cricketer. He has played 22 First class, 23 List A and 11 Twenty20 matches.
