= Rajendra Bhalekar =

Indian cricketer (1952–2018)

Personal information
- Full name: Rajendra Balkrishna Bhalekar
- Born: 17 February 1952; Pune, India
- Died: 14 April 2018 (aged 66); Pune, India
- Source: Cricinfo, 17 April 2018

Rajendra Bhalekar (17 February 1952 – 14 April 2018) was an Indian cricketer. He played 74 first-class matches between 1972 and 1986 and was the captain of the Maharashtra cricket team.

== See also ==
- List of Maharashtra cricketers
