= Aniruddha Oak =

Indian cricketer

Aniruddha Oak (born 4 September 1973) was an Indian cricketer. He was a right-handed batsman and right-arm medium-pace bowler who played for Maharashtra. He was born in Pune.

Oak made his cricketing debut in the One-Day Ranji Trophy during the 1997–98 season, against Saurashtra, and took figures of 1-24 from 6 overs of bowling.

Oak's only first-class appearance came during the 2000–01 season, against Mumbai, against whom he scored 0 not out in the first innings in which he batted, and 15 runs in the second.

Oak made his final List A appearance in 2002–03, scoring just a single run.
