= Bal Pandit =

Personal information
- Full name: Bal Jagannath Pandit
- Born: 24 July 1929; Pune, Maharashtra, India
- Died: 17 September 2015 (aged 86); Pune, Maharashtra, India
- Batting: Right-handed

Domestic team information
- Years: Team
- 1959–1960: Maharashtra

Career statistics
Competition	First-class
Matches	1
Runs scored	25
Batting average	25
100s/50s	0/0
Top score	25
Catches/stumpings	0/–
- Source: ESPNcricinfo, 2 October 2015

Bal Jagannath Pandit (24 July 1929 – 17 September 2015) was an Indian cricketer, writer and broadcaster.

== Early life ==
He was born in Pune. He was a right-handed batsman who played for Maharashtra.

== Playing career ==
Pandit made his cricketing debut in the Rohinton Baria Trophy, in which he played for Poona University for two seasons between 1951 and 1953. He made a single first-class appearance, during the 1959–60 season, representing Maharashtra against Gujarat in the Ranji Trophy. In the only innings in which he batted, he scored 25 runs.

== Later career ==
Pandit was a pioneer in Marathi cricket commentary and was commissioned by All India Radio for many decades. His coining of new words in Marathi for cricket terms such as ‘aapat-baar’ for a bouncer ball received wide popularity. He was also a cricket commentator in English for a short period. Being a first-class cricketer himself, Pandit's commentary was clinical. He was known for focusing on the scope of improvement in a player in his commentary. His achievements in live commentary for 40 years was also noticed by the Limca Book of World Records

Bal Pandit was the secretary of Maharashtra Cricket Association (MCA) in the mid-1980s. He was also the President of Maharashtra Cricket Association. He played a vital role in the selection committee of the organisation.

Pandit was also a Trustee of the Dnyaneshwar Maharaj Samadhi temple complex in Alandi from 1966 to 1999. He was member of the managing committee of Education institutions, Shikshan Prasarak Mandali, Pune, Deccan Education Society and Modern Education Society.

=== Books ===
Pandit was also a prolific cricket writer and wrote 35 books. He authored several columns in newspapers and magazines, striking a chord with common people and enhancing their knowledge with illustrations. His translation of Sunil Gavaskar’s book Sunny Days in Marathi became immensely popular. He authored a number of books in Marathi.

- Sunny Days (translation in Marathi)
- The Little Master
- Prakrami Daura
- Ase Samane Ase Kheladu
- Athawanitil Vyakti Ani Prasang
- Cricketmadhil Navalkatha
- Cricket Tantra Ani Mantra
- “ Lokmanyancha Manasputra"

== Awards ==
The Maharashtra government recognized him with the Shiv Chhatrapati Sports award in 1978.

== Death ==
Bal Pandit died due to prolonged illness on the afternoon of 17 September 2015.
