= Ramesh Kadam (cricketer) =

Indian cricketer (born 1962)

Ramesh Kadam (born 26 December 1962) was an Indian cricketer. He was a right-handed batsman and right-arm medium-pace bowler who played for Maharashtra. He was born in Kolhapur.

Kadam made a single first-class appearance for the side, during the 1987–88 season, against Baroda. He did not bat in either innings of the match.

Kadam took a single catch, that of Mayur Patel.
