= Srinivas Wayangankar =

Indian cricketer (born 1946)

Srinivas Wayangankar (born 1 August 1946) was an Indian cricketer. He was a right-handed batsman and right-arm off-break bowler who played for Maharashtra. He was born in Bombay.

Wayangankar made a single first-class appearance for the side, during the 1963–64 season, against Baroda. He did not bat in the match, but bowled two overs, taking figures of 1–7, his single wicket being that of Vijay Indulkar.
