= B. B. Nimbalkar =

Indian cricketer (1919–2012)

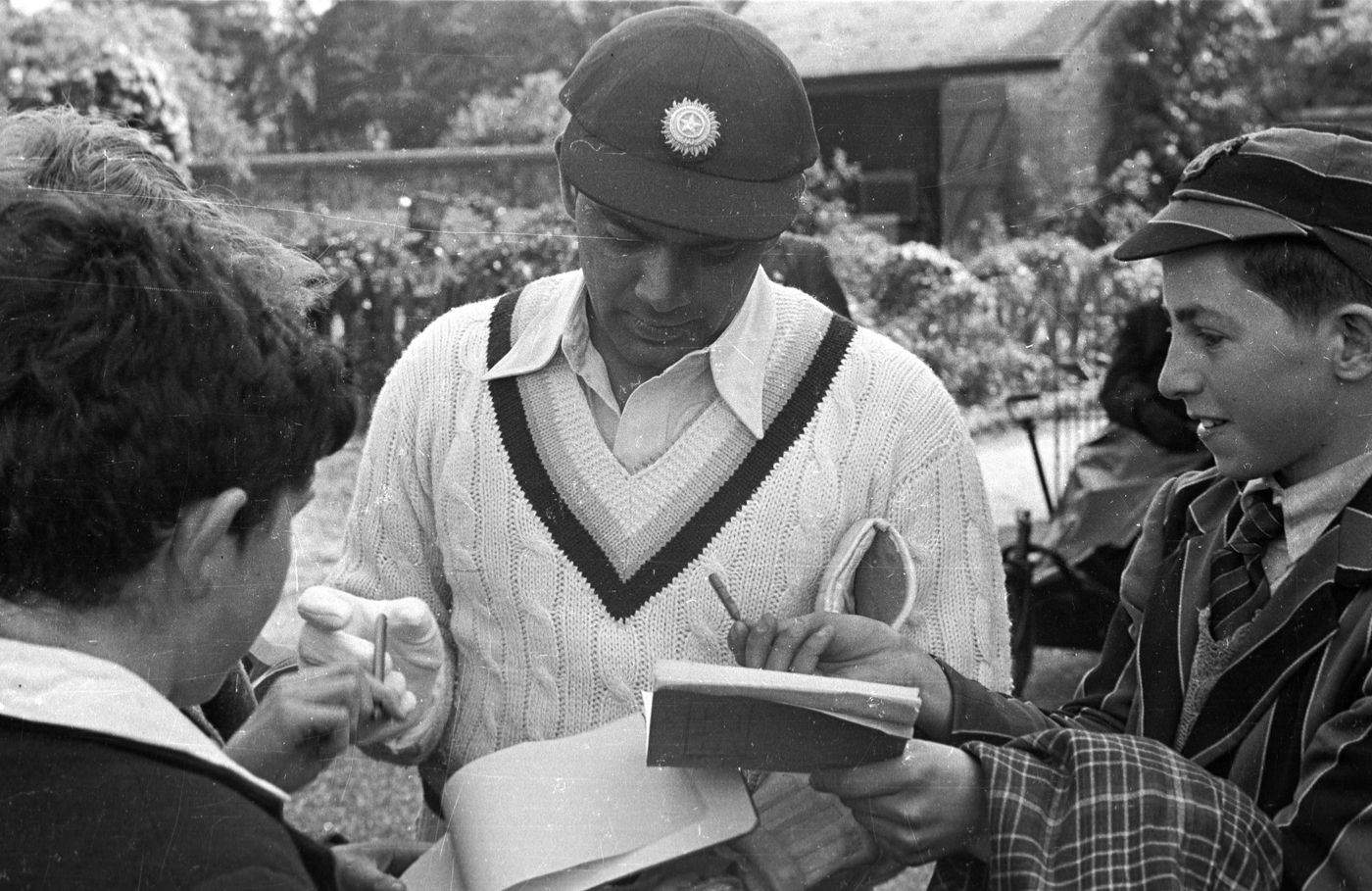
- B. B. Nimbalkar signing autographs in 1946

Personal information
- Full name: Bhausaheb Babasaheb Nimbalkar
- Born: 12 December 1919; Kolhapur, Bombay Presidency, British India
- Died: 11 December 2012 (aged 92); Kolhapur, Maharashtra, India
- Batting: Right-handed
- Bowling: Right-arm fast-medium
- Role: Batsman; Occasional wicket-keeper
- Relatives: R. B. Nimbalkar (brother), S. B. Nimbalkar (son)

Domestic team information
- Years: Team
- 1939/40: Baroda
- 1941/42–1950/51: Maharashtra
- 1942/43–1957/58: Holkar
- 1955/56: Madhya Bharat
- 1956/57–1957/58: Rajasthan
- 1958/59–1963/64: Railways

Career statistics
Competition	FC
Matches	80
Runs scored	4,841
Batting average	47.93
100s/50s	12/22
Top score	443*
Balls bowled	4,038
Wickets	58
Bowling average	40.22
5 wickets in innings	–
10 wickets in match	–
Best bowling	4/56
Catches/stumpings	37/10
- Source: CricketArchive (subscription required), 11 December 2012

Bhausaheb Babasaheb Nimbalkar (12 December 1919 – 11 December 2012) was an Indian first-class cricketer who is remembered for his innings of 443 not out in the 1948–49 Ranji Trophy match between Maharashtra and Kathiawar. At the time, it was the second-highest score in the history of first-class cricket. It remains the Indian record and is also the highest score by a batsman who never played in Test cricket. Nimbalkar was a right-handed batsman whose career spanned the seasons from 1939/40 to 1963/64. He played for six first-class teams: Baroda, Maharashtra, Holkar, Madhya Bharat, Rajasthan, and Railways. He was an occasional wicket-keeper and a right-arm fast-medium bowler.

== Early life ==
Nimbalkar was born in Kolhapur. He had his early education at the Model School in Kolhapur, and captained the school team at the age of 15.

== Career ==
=== Debut ===
Nimbalkar joined Baroda and, aged 19, made his first-class and Ranji Trophy debut on 18–20 November 1939 against Gujarat at Baroda's Police Gymkhana Ground. (Note: Nimbalkar's debut at the Police Gymkhana was the only first-class match ever played on the ground.) Baroda won the match by 52 runs. They scored 127 and 166; Gujarat replied with 100 and 141. Batting in the lower middle order, Nimbalkar scored 6 and 27. He opened the bowling with Edulji Gai and took 3/16 and 1/36. His older brother, wicket-keeper Raosaheb Nimbalkar, was also playing that match and the two often appeared alongside each other.

=== Record score in India ===
Nimbalkar moved to Maharashtra and played for them until 1950/51. During the 1948–49 Ranji Trophy, in the match against Kathiawar on the Poona Club Ground, Nimbalkar scored 443 not out. At the time, Nimbalkar's innings was second only to Don Bradman's 452 not out (in 1929/30) as the world record for the highest individual innings in first-class cricket. Currently, the innings is the fourth-highest of all time, having been surpassed by those of Pakistani batting great Hanif Mohammad (499 in 1958/59) and the greatest West Indian Brian Lara (501* in 1994).

He was unable to break the record because, with the total standing at 826 for 4 at the lunch interval, the opposing captain, the Thakore Saheb of Rajkot, conceded the match to prevent embarrassment on the part of his team. Bradman sent a personal note to Nimbalkar saying that he considered Nimbalkar's innings better than his own.

=== Summary ===
Despite an impressive batting average of 56.72 in Ranji Trophy matches, and his additional abilities as a wicket-keeper and a fast-medium bowler, Nimbalkar never played Test cricket during a first-class career that stretched from 1939–40 to 1963–64. He was named the Indian Cricketer of the Year in 1952/53.

== Later years and death ==
Between 1976/77 and 1982/83, Nimbalkar's son, Suryaji Nimbalkar, played in twelve first-class matches for Railways and Maharashtra. Nimbalkar received the C. K. Nayudu Lifetime Achievement Award in 2002, the highest honour bestowed on a former player by the Board of Control for Cricket in India. He died in Kolhapur on 11 December 2012, the day before his 93rd birthday.
