= Rakesh Dhruv =

Indian cricketer (born 1981)

Personal information
- Full name: Rakesh Vinubhai Dhruv
- Born: 12 May 1981 (age 45); Jamnagar, Gujarat, India
- Batting: Left-handed
- Bowling: Slow left-arm orthodox
- Role: Bowler

Domestic team information
- Years: Team
- 1999/00–2010/11: Saurashtra
- 2012/13–2017: Gujarat

Career statistics
Competition	FC	LA	T20
Matches	86	46	20
Runs scored	2793	653	177
Batting average	25.86	25.11	22.12
100s/50s	1/13	0/3	0/0
Top score	117	70*	33*
Balls bowled	15627	2390	420
Wickets	242	45	18
Bowling average	29.91	44.91	26.61
5 wickets in innings	11	0	0
10 wickets in match	1	0	0
Best bowling	8/31	3/23	4/20
Catches/stumpings	35/–	17/–	7/-
- Source: Cricinfo, 26 December 2013

Rakesh Vinubhai Dhruv (born 12 May 1981) is a former Indian cricketer who played for Gujarat in Indian domestic cricket. He was a slow left-arm orthodox bowler. He represented the India A cricket team in 2013. In October 2017, he announced his retirement from all forms of cricket.

== Career ==
Dhruv made his first-class debut for Saurashtra in the 1999/00 season. He played for Saurashtra until the 2010/11 season. In 2012, he switched to Gujarat and made immediate impact with his bowling. In a Ranji Trophy group match against Rajasthan in December 2012, Dhruv picked up 6/65 in the first innings and 8/31 in the second innings. He finished the season with 36 wickets from eight matches at an average of 25.55. His impressive bowling was rewarded by the national selectors who drafted him into the India A squad for the three-day match against the touring Australian team in February 2013. He picked up 5/31 in the first innings and 1/37 in the second innings, taking wickets of regular Test batsmen such as Shane Watson and Ed Cowan.
