= Hadapsar Gliding Centre =

Glider airport in Maharashtra, India

- IATA: none; ICAO: none

Summary
- Airport type: Private
- Owner: Directorate General of Civil Aviation (India)
- Operator: Gliding Centre
- Location: Pune, India
- Elevation AMSL: 1,885 ft / 574.5 m
- Coordinates: 18°29′33″N 073°56′27″E

Map

Runways
Direction	Length		Surface
Direction	ft	m	Surface
09/27	3,568	1,087	Un-Paved
- Frequency 136.0, flight plan zzzz Radial 165 PPN 5NM. Contact Pune ATS for further details.

Hadapsar Gliding Centre, also known as Gliding Centre Pune, is a gliderdrome situated at Hadapsar in Pune, Maharashtra. It is owned by the Directorate General of Civil Aviation (DGCA) and used by the Gliding Centre of the DGCA. The gliderdrome is spread over 230 acres It consists of a one-km-long unpaved airstrip, a couple of hangars housing the gliders used for daily flying exercises and an administrative block.

== History ==
In 2011, Government-owned helicopter service company Pawan Hans (PHL) was assigned the task to develop a Helicopter Training Academy cum heliport at Hadapsar. The project was approved by the Ministry of Civil Aviation and the DGCA released Rs.10 crore for the purpose. A memorandum of understanding (MoU) was also signed with the DGCA for the utilisation of land and other infrastructural facilities. However, in 2017, the Government of India approved the privatization of Pawan Hans following which PHL formally backed out of the project in 2019, stating that it does not want to continue any business association with respect to such facility.

The Gliding Centre was a brainchild of former Prime Minister Jawaharlal Nehru to train youngsters for glider pilot licenses. It is the country's only operational facility of its kind under the DGCA. The centre carries out about 3,000 flights a year, the majority of them on Sundays when the club is open to enthusiasts from the city. The Gliding Centre operates a fleet of LET L-23 Super Blanik Sailplanes. The flying season starts from October and continues up to May or early June. The airfield is not operational during the monsoon.
