= J. D. Walsh (coach) =

American basketball player and coach

John David "J. D." Walsh (born October 25, 1972), is an American basketball coach. Walsh is a native of West Islip, NY and currently resides in New York City and New Delhi, India. Walsh graduated from University of Maryland, College Park in 1996.

== Playing career ==
Walsh was a former High School McDonald's All-American (Honorable Mention) his senior year at St. Thomas More School in Oakdale, CT in 1991. He was a full scholarship team member of University of Maryland's men's basketball team from 1991 to 1993. His teammates included NBA players Walt Williams, Evers Burns, Keith Booth, and Joe Smith. Walsh's NCAA career ended early because of a back injury in 1993.

He competed in the Empire State Games in 1991 and in 1996. He was the third leading scorer as part of the gold medal team along with NBA players Wally Szczerbiak and Speedy Claxton in Buffalo, New York. In 1996, he had a short semi-professional stint in Ireland for St. Vincent's Dublin.

== Coaching career ==
Walsh began as a volunteer coach in 1997 for Vincent Smith, assisting the Aim High AAU Team in Queens, NY. He began his high school coaching career in 1998 at Roslyn High School and on to St. John the Baptist Diocesan High School from 1999 to 2004, where he was instrumental in coaching future talent such as Donald Brown (Bucknell University), Kenny Harris (Hofstra University), Ryan Johnson (Hofstra University), Kevin Spann (CW Post), Prentice Small (Lehigh University), and Ed Zajac (Quinnipiac College).

Walsh has worked as a basketball trainer for hundreds of players including former and current NBA and WNBA players Shay Doron, Troy Murphy, and Smush Parker. He has worked with the New York City Department of Education through its CHAMPS program and written a handbook for all New York City Public Schools Junior High School basketball coaches. Walsh has trained with the Chinese Basketball Association, Dominican Republic National Team, Beijing Ducks, United States Department of State, Maccabi Tel Aviv, and Israel Junior Team. In November 2007, he conducted program for the Qatar Basketball Federation and Olympic Committee in Doha, Qatar.

== Actor/Model ==
Walsh appeared in numerous commercial and print ads, including television commercials for ESPN in 1995, Pizza Hut in 1997, and Converse in 1998. Walsh had a role in the film Game Day in 1999, starring Richard Lewis and directed by Steven Klein.

== 2008 Moral Entertainment Persian Gulf Tour ==
In 2008, Walsh participated in the first ever tour of Air Force bases in the Persian Gulf region with Morale Entertainment and Air Forces Entertainment along with NCAA football head coaches Mark Richt, University of Georgia; Randy Shannon, University of Miami; Jack Siedlecki, Yale University; Tommy Tuberville, Auburn University; and Charlie Weis, University of Notre Dame.

== JDBASKETBALL School ==
Walsh started JD Walsh Basketball School, or JDBASKETBALL School, in 1998 in Great Neck, NY to teach local kids in the New York metro area the fundamentals of basketball. Since then, it has evolved into global enterprise that has operated on three continents with more than 15,000 participants involved. Walsh has toured countries and held camps worldwide in countries such as China, Dominican Republic, India, Italy, Kashmir, Qatar, and Taiwan.

=== China ===
In 2002, Walsh was a critical member and founding partner of a negotiating team awarded a prestigious 10-year agreement and co-operation with SingOlym Sports Technology and the Chinese Basketball Association to aid and develop grassroots basketball in China and promote friendship between the United States and China. The United States Elite All-Stars vs. China National Junior Team game series was viewed by over 300 million in China on CCTV and became international news. Players in the games included Yi Jianlian, Darryl Hill (St. John's University), and Juan Palacios (Louisville University). The SAIS New Star Camp was of first of its kind and attended by over 150 Chinese youth at the Beijing Sport University. The coaches’ clinic required attendance for all national, professional, and Olympic coaches in China and was assisted by NBA players and coaches including Speedy Claxton, Sonny Parker (basketball), Sandra VanEmbricqs, and Jim Todd.

Walsh was head coach of Banyan Tree All-Stars for the 2005 and 2006 tours of North China with Heilongjiang Province Sports Department. The tour team included Andrew Mitchell (Sweden Professional) and Leon Brisport (Providence College, Stony Brook University).

=== India ===
Walsh first visited Pune in June 2007 to work with the club, Deccan Gymkhana.

Since then, JDBASKETBALL has conducted over 75 camps in cities such as Bangalore, Chennai, Kolkata, Midnapore, Mumbai, New Delhi, Pune, Patiala, and Trivandrum for over 5,000 Indian youth. He has conducted clinics for eight State Basketball Associations in addition to coaches' clinics for Kolkata's West Bengal Basketball Association, Pune's Fergusson College, Tamil Nadu Basketball Association, and the Sports Development Authority of Tamil Nadu.

In May 2009, JDBASKETBALL ran camps in Mumbai, Chennai, Delhi (Delhi Public School), and Patiala (Netaji Subhas National Institute of Sports) with famous Indian coach, Ramesh Kelley. The Mumbai camp, sponsored by the Basketball Federation of India, was held for over 700 in attendance at the Youth National Championships in Nagpada, Mumbai.

In recognition for his work, Walsh has received special awards of distinction from Pune Municipal Corporation by the former Leader of the Opposition and Bharatiya Janata Party leader, Vikas Mathkari. Walsh has been quoted in Indian press to be building a training academy in North India.

=== Israel and Sulha Peace Project ===
Walsh's first major camp, made possible by the Sulha Peace Project, was in the Middle East at a Bedouin camp in the desert outside Eilat, where he worked with Palestinian and Israeli youth and Christian, Muslim, and Jewish leaders to work on non-conflict resolution.

=== Kashmir and Hoops for Health ===
Walsh teamed up with Child Nurture and Relief (CHINAR) in 2007 to conduct a three-year basketball program in Kashmir. The children were introduced to basketball in a three-day skills training and team building program, attracting national attention to the new innovative solution to bring about social change. The goal is to use basketball to support the psychosocial rehabilitation and provide a means of community integration of the CHINAR children. In the future, there are plans to build an on-site basketball court as well as forming a team that will travel and compete. In 2008, CHINAR won the Nike Sport for a Better World/Changemakers competition, providing funding for the Hoops for Health project.

=== Taiwan ===
In 2007, Walsh ran summer program at the prestigious Tsai Hsing School in Taipei.

=== United States Department of State ===
Walsh has worked in a diplomatic speaker program with United States Consulates and American Centers in Doha, Qatar and in North, South, West, and East Indian regions to promote world peace and diplomacy through sport

=== On Senate Record ===
Also, during a hearing on April 24, 2008, on national security reform held by Joe Biden, former United States Deputy Secretary of State Richard Armitage praised Walsh's unique approach to public diplomacy through basketball:

You know the most effective public diplomacy I've seen? It's been basketball...There's a J.D. Walsh right now in basketball, he's a Maryland graduate, he's in India doing this same thing, but he's expanded on the idea. He's using it to also, as they teach basketball, to have HIV/AIDS testing, to teach courses in nonviolent conflict resolution. He's not talking about Arab-Israeli peace issues, or Al Qaida, for that matter, but he's having more effect in diplomacy than you can imagine.
