= 1992–93 Ranji Trophy =

1992-93 Ranji Trophy
- The Ranji Trophy, which the winners get.
- Administrator: BCCI
- Cricket format: First-class cricket
- Tournament format(s): League and knockout
- Champions: Punjab (1st title)
- Participants: 26
- Most runs: Santosh Jedhe (Maharashtra) (867)
- Most wickets: Bharati Vij (Punjab) (49)

The 1992–93 Ranji Trophy was the 59th season of the Ranji Trophy. Punjab won their first title defeating Maharashtra.

== Highlights ==
- Santosh Jedhe scored 867 runs and took 37 wickets in the season

== Group stage ==
=== Central Zone ===
Team	Pld	W	L	D	T	NR	Pts	RR
Madhya Pradesh	4	2	0	2	0	0	76	3.630
Uttar Pradesh	4	2	1	1	0	0	64	3.601
Railways	4	1	2	1	0	0	56	3.932
Vidarbha	4	2	0	2	0	0	54	3.142
Rajasthan	4	0	4	0	0	0	25	2.216

=== North Zone ===
Team	Pld	W	L	D	T	NR	Pts	RR
Delhi	4	2	0	2	0	0	70	2.930
Punjab	4	2	0	2	0	0	68	3.189
Haryana	4	2	0	2	0	0	63	2.928
Himachal Pradesh	4	0	3	1	0	0	21	2.663
Services	4	0	3	1	0	0	16	2.915

=== South Zone ===
Team	Pld	W	L	D	T	NR	Pts	RR
Tamil Nadu	5	3	0	2	0	0	84	3.331
Hyderabad	5	2	0	3	0	0	80	3.245
Karnataka	5	2	1	2	0	0	79	3.047
Andhra	5	1	1	3	0	0	40	2.833
Kerala	5	1	2	2	0	0	39	3.107
Goa	5	0	5	0	0	0	21	2.431

=== West Zone ===
Team	Pld	W	L	D	T	NR	Pts	RR
Bombay	4	1	0	3	0	0	68	3.783
Maharashtra	4	2	0	2	0	0	63	3.569
Baroda	4	1	1	2	0	0	45	3.327
Saurashtra	4	0	0	4	0	0	32	2.762
Gujarat	4	0	3	1	0	0	27	2.577

=== East Zone ===
Team	Pld	W	L	D	T	NR	Pts	RR
Bengal	4	4	0	0	0	0	91	3.805
Assam	4	1	1	2	0	0	54	3.031
Bihar	4	1	1	2	0	0	50	2.744
Orissa	4	1	1	2	0	0	40	2.940
Tripura	4	0	4	0	0	0	13	2.354

== Knockout stage ==
Pre-Quarter-finals
5 Feb 1993 — Ludhiana
Punjab	196 & 318/4
Bengal	209 & 327
5 Feb 1993 — Secunderabad
Hyderabad	416 & 320
Baroda	431/9d & 254
5 Feb 1993 — Bangalore
Karnataka	342 & 232
Madhya Pradesh	406 & 173
5 Feb 1993 — Pune
Maharashtra (F)	405 & 393/1d
Railways	399 & 124/2
5 Feb 1993 — Madras
Tamil Nadu	547
Assam	251 & 224
5 Feb 1993 — Ghaziabad
Uttar Pradesh (F)	454 & 263
Haryana	283 & 505/6d
5 Feb 1993 — Bombay
Bombay	458
Bihar	182 & 325

Quarter-finals
19 Feb 1993 — Ludhiana
Punjab	198 & 65/1
Hyderabad	82 & 180
19 Feb 1993 — Bhopal
Madhya Pradesh (F)	347 & 263/4
Delhi	330
19 Feb 1993 — Bhusawal
Maharashtra	384 & 102/0
Tamil Nadu	267 & 215
19 Feb 1993 — Kanpur
Uttar Pradesh (T)	33/0
Bombay	133/2d

Semi-finals
12 Mar 1993 — Ludhiana
Punjab	217 & 216
Madhya Pradesh	154 & 199
12 Mar 1993 — Pune
Maharashtra	378 & 317
Uttar Pradesh	314 & 282

Finals
27 Mar 1993 — Ludhiana
Punjab	318 & 146
Maharashtra	212 & 132

(F) - Advanced to next round on First Innings Lead
(T) - Advanced to next round on Spin of Coin

=== Final ===
27–30 March 1993
Scorecard

Punjab (H)	v	Maharashtra
318 (119.4 overs); Amit Sharma 161; Santosh Jedhe 4/111		212 (75.2 overs); Santosh Jedhe 42; Bharati Vij 6/61
146 (70.4 overs); Gursharan Singh 44; Shrikant Jadhav 5/55		132 (52.4 overs); Santosh Jedhe 25; Bharati Vij 3/33

Punjab won by 120 runs
Punjab Agricultural University Stadium, Ludhiana
Umpires: A. L. Narasimhan, Subroto Porel

- Punjab won the toss and decided to bat

== Scorecards and averages ==
- CricketArchive
