= Sunil Gudge =

Indian cricketer (1959–2016)

Personal information
- Full name: Sunil Chandrakant Gudge
- Born: 31 December 1959; Poona, Maharashtra
- Died: 3 May 2016 (aged 56); Poona, Maharashtra
- Batting: Right-handed
- Bowling: Legbreak googly
- Role: Bowler

Domestic team information
- Years: Team
- 1979/80-1996/97: Maharashtra
- Source: ESPNcricinfo, 11 October 2015

Sunil Chandrakant Gudge (31 December 1959 – 3 May 2016) was an Indian first-class cricketer who played for Maharashtra cricket team from 1979/80 to 1996/97.
