= Abhijit Kale =

Indian cricketer (born 1973)

Abhi
Personal information
- Born: 3 July 1973 (age 53); Ahmednagar
- Batting: Right-handed
- Bowling: Right-arm offbreak

Career statistics
Competition	ODI	First-class
Matches	1	93
Runs scored	10	7,134
Batting average	10.00	54.45
100s/50s	0/0	25/28
Top score	10	248*
Balls bowled	–	560
Wickets	–	3
Bowling average	–	113.0
5 wickets in innings	–	0
10 wickets in match	–	0
Best bowling	–	1/3
Catches/stumpings	0/–	75/–
- Source: ESPNcricinfo, 21 April 2007

Abhijit Vasant Kale (born 4 July 1973) is a former Indian cricketer. He was a right-handed batsman and a right-arm offbreak bowler who played a single One-Day International match and never appeared in Tests.

== Career ==
Kale began his career in 1992 for the Indian Under-19s against New Zealand. But in first class cricket, he could not find a regular place in the Bombay cricket team and hence moved to Maharashtra cricket team, for which he played during the mid-1990s and averaged nearly 60 runs per innings.

He played his only ODI match against Bangladesh at Dhaka in the TVS Cup in 2003.

In 2009, playing for Linden Park CC (an illustrious English club, with a rich history), Kale hit 39 runs – including six sixes in a row – off a single over in Kent, England. His achievement was helped by the fact that there were nine deliveries in the over, including three no balls. Kale scored a single off bowler Damion Grosscel's first ball, which was then matched by batting partner Michael Chodster Brown. Then came a two by Abhijit – followed by six consecutive sixes.
