= Santosh Jedhe =

Indian cricketer and coach (born 1966)

Personal information
- Full name: Santosh Venkatrao Jedhe
- Born: 9 June 1966 (age 60); Poona, Maharashtra, India
- Batting: Right-handed
- Bowling: Right-arm offspin
- Role: All-rounder

Domestic team information
- Years: Team
- 1989/90: Maharashtra
- Source: CricInfo, 24 September 2022

Santosh Venkatrao Jedhe (born 9 June 1966) is an Indian former cricketer and current head coach of the Maharashtra cricket team.

Jedhe represented Maharashtra in 48 first-class matches between 1989 and 1998. An all-rounder, he played an important role in Maharashtra's 1992–93 Ranji Trophy season by scoring 867 runs and claiming 37 wickets. He was the leading run-scorer in that season's Ranji Trophy. He played an important part in Maharashtra's victory in the quarter-final against Tamil Nadu at Bhusawal, scoring 168 runs in the first innings and taking five wickets in the second innings. He was named one of the Indian Cricket Cricketers of the Year in the annual's 1993 edition.
