= Murtuja Vahora =

Indian cricketer (born 1985)

Personal information
- Full name: Murtuja Yahubhi Vahora
- Born: 1 December 1985 (age 40); Vadodara, Gujarat, India
- Batting: Right-handed
- Bowling: Right-arm medium-fast
- Role: Bowler

Domestic team information
- Years: Team
- 2006/07–present: Baroda

Career statistics
| Competition | FC | LA | T20 |
|---|---|---|---|
| Matches | 31 | 13 | 16 |
| Runs scored | 386 | 117 | 53 |
| Batting average | 12.45 | 23.40 | 17.66 |
| 100s/50s | 0/0 | 0/1 | 0/0 |
| Top score | 47 | 50 | 45* |
| Balls bowled | 5409 | 667 | 331 |
| Wickets | 85 | 19 | 15 |
| Bowling average | 28.71 | 27.42 | 26.26 |
| 5 wickets in innings | 2 | 0 | 0 |
| 10 wickets in match | 0 | 0 | 0 |
| Best bowling | 5/34 | 3/24 | 3/27 |
| Catches/stumpings | 17/– | 5/– | 13/– |
- Source: ESPNcricinfo, 12 January 2013

Murtuja Yahubhi Vahora (born 1 December 1985) is an Indian first-class cricketer who plays for Baroda in domestic cricket. He is a right-arm medium-fast bowler.
