= Ganesh Gaikwad =

Indian cricketer

Ganesh Gaikwad (born 4 December 1987) is an Indian cricketer. He is a right-handed batsman and right-arm off-break bowler who plays for Maharashtra. He was born in Pune.

Gaikwad made his cricketing debut for the Under-14s team during the 2000–01 season, and made his way through the Under-15s, Under-17s, Under-19s and Under-22s teams. He made his first-class debut in December 2008, and made four appearances during the 2008-09 Vijay Hazare Trophy competition.

Since May 2009 he has appeared for the Maharashtra Cricket Association XI in tours of Bangladesh and Australia.

In the fourth season of IPL, he was signed by Pune Warriors India.
