= Harshad Khadiwale =

Indian Cricketer (born 1988)

Personal information
- Full name: Harshad Hemantkumar Khadiwale
- Born: 21 October 1988 (age 38); Pune, Maharashtra, India
- Batting: Right-handed
- Bowling: Right-arm medium-fast
- Role: Opening batsman

Domestic team information
- Years: Team
- 2006/07–2017/18: Maharashtra

Career statistics
Competition	FC	LA	T20
Matches	80	38	26
Runs scored	5,367	981	630
Batting average	40.96	26.51	24.23
100s/50s	12/26	0/8	0/3
Top score	183	79	88
Balls bowled	1,313	344	6
Wickets	11	11	0
Bowling average	62.55	31.90	–
5 wickets in innings	0	0	–
10 wickets in match	0	0	–
Best bowling	3/46	3/55	–
Catches/stumpings	25/–	13/–	8/–
- Source: Cricinfo, 9 November 2026

Harshad Hemantkumar Khadiwale (born 21 October 1988) is an Indian former cricketer who played for Maharashtra in Indian domestic cricket. He was a right-handed opening batsman and a right-arm medium-fast bowler. He represented Pune Warriors and Kolkata Knight Riders in Indian Premier League. Currently he is the Head Coach for Maharashtra.

Khadiwale made his debut for Maharashtra at the age of 18 against Hyderabad during the 2006/07 season. During that season, he made 198 runs from 6 innings at an average of 33, scoring two fifties. He scored his first first-class hundred against Tamil Nadu in the first match of the 2007/08 season. In the back of some good knocks for Maharashtra in the next season, he was picked in the West Zone squad for Duleep Trophy. Ever since, he has been the most consistent batsman for Maharashtra.

In 2010, he was contracted by the IPL franchise Kolkata Knight Riders. In 2011, he was contracted by the IPL franchise Pune Warriors.
