= Rohit Motwani =

Indian cricketer (born 1990)

Personal information
- Full name: Rohit Heero Motwani
- Born: 13 December 1990 (age 35); Pune, Maharashtra, India
- Batting: Left-handed
- Role: Wicket-keeper

Domestic team information
- Years: Team
- 2007–present: Maharashtra

Career statistics
Competition	FC	LA	T20
Matches	34	24	20
Runs scored	1897	496	258
Batting average	39.52	24.80	12.90
100s/50s	2/14	1/2	0/0
Top score	147	101	36
Catches/stumpings	80/5	24/7	12/5
- Source: Cricinfo, 1 January 2013

Rohit Heero Motwani (born 13 December 1990) is an Indian cricketer. He is a left-handed wicketkeeper-batsman who plays in the Indian domestic cricket for Maharashtra.

He was included in the India A squad to play the warm-up one-day match against England on 6 January 2013.

He was the leading run-scorer for Maharashtra in the 2017–18 Ranji Trophy, with 460 runs in five matches.
