= Surendra Bhave =

Indian first-class cricketer

Personal information
- Full name: Surendra Shriram Bhave
- Born: 30 March 1966 (age 60); Pune, Maharashtra, India
- Batting: Right-handed
- Bowling: Right-arm medium pace
- Role: Opening batsman

Domestic team information
- Years: Team
- 1986–2001: Maharashtra

Career statistics
Competition	FC	List A
Matches	97	51
Runs scored	7,971	1,808
Batting average	58.18	38.46
100s/50s	28/27	2/13
Top score	292	124*
Balls bowled	1,214	209
Wickets	8	4
Bowling average	76.62	42.75
5 wickets in innings	0	0
10 wickets in match	0	0
Best bowling	2/42	2/47
Catches/stumpings	121/–	22/–
- Source: CricketArchive, 10 March 2001

Surendra Shriram Bhave (born 30 March 1966) is a former Indian first-class cricketer hailing from Pune district, who played for his home state Maharashtra from 1986 to 2001. A right-handed opening batsman, noted for his run scoring and ability to build large innings, Bhave regularly captained Maharashtra throughout the 1990s.

His ability to lead the innings and provide stability left a legacy in the Ranji Trophy tournaments. After his retirement in 2001, Bhave focused on coaching and was hired by Cadence Cricket Academy, owned by Ajay Shirke, the Maharashtra Cricket Association chief.

== Career ==
Bhave had a strong start to his career, after making one first-class appearance in both 1986/87 and 1987/88 he made the most of his opportunity in 1988/89 by scoring 730 runs at an average of 91.25. Of his four hundreds that season, the biggest was an innings of 274 which he made against a Dilip Vengsarkar-led Bombay team. He would score a further six double hundreds in his career, three of them in 1992. Such was his consistency that it was not until 1997/98 that he ended a season with an average under 50 and he never scored less than 800 runs from 1992/93 to 1996/97.

Although Maharashtra never won the Ranji Trophy while Bhave was at the club, he did captain them to the final in 1992/93. Playing against Punjab, Bhave failed in both innings and in the end it was a maiden first-class century to Amit Sharma that was the difference.

Bhave played for India A in the 1992/93 SAARC Quadrangular, a limited overs series also competed for by Sri Lanka A, Bangladesh A and Pakistan A. Bhave scored 81 against the Sri Lankans and although India made the final, the contest was canceled following rioting in the host city of Dhaka.

He also represented West Zone in the Duleep Trophy on occasions and on 2 December 1994 made 292 for the team in a first-class match against South Zone at Rourkela. His 739-minute vigil ended when he was bowled by offspinner Kanwaljit Singh.

The right-hander was particularly productive against Saurashtra during his career, plundering them for 1,471 runs at 91.93 with seven hundreds.
