= Samad Fallah =

Indian cricketer (born 1985)

Personal information
- Full name: Samad Mohammed Fallah
- Born: 2 May 1985 (age 41); Hyderabad, Andhra Pradesh, India
- Batting: Left-handed
- Bowling: Left-arm medium
- Role: Bowler

Domestic team information
- Years: Team
- 2007/08–2020/21: Maharashtra

Career statistics
Competition	FC	LA	T20
Matches	78	50	58
Runs scored	378	53	14
Batting average	6.00	5.88	4.66
100s/50s	0/0	0/0	0/0
Top score	28	32	5*
Balls bowled	18,059	2607	1286
Wickets	287	75	62
Bowling average	28.48	28.33	25.48
5 wickets in innings	14	1	0
10 wickets in match	1	0	0
Best bowling	8/98	5/41	4/12
Catches/stumpings	17/–	1/–	8/-
- Source: ESPNcricinfo, 4 July 2012

Samad Mohammed Fallah (born 2 May 1985) is an Indian former first-class cricketer who played for Maharashtra in domestic cricket. He is a left-arm medium-pace bowler who was previously a part of Rajasthan Royals squad in the Indian Premier League.

He was the joint-leading wicket-taker for Maharashtra in the 2018–19 Vijay Hazare Trophy, with fifteen dismissals in eight matches.

On 22 June 2024, he announced his retirement from professional cricket.
