= Maharashtra cricket team =

Indian cricket team

- महाराष्ट्र क्रिकेट संघ

Personnel
- Captain: Prithvi Shaw (FC); Ruturaj Gaikwad (LA & T20)
- Coach: Harshad Khadiwale
- Owner: Maharashtra Cricket Association

Team information
- Colours: Yellow Blue
- Founded: 1934
- Home ground: Maharashtra Cricket Association Stadium, Pune
- Capacity: 45,000

History
- First-class debut: Vs Bombay, Poona Gymkhana Ground, Pune, 1934
- List A debut: Vs Bengal, Nehru Stadium, Pune, 1995
- Twenty20 debut: Vs Gujarat, Wankhede Stadium, Mumbai, 2007
- Ranji Trophy wins: 2 (1939/40, 1940/41)
- Vijay Hazare Trophy wins: 1 (1994/95)
- Syed Mushtaq Ali Trophy wins: 1 (2009-2010)
- Official website: MCA
LA/T20 Kit

The Maharashtra cricket team is a state cricket team that represents the Maharashtra state in domestic cricket of India. It is governed by Maharashtra Cricket Association. It plays its home matches at Maharashtra Cricket Association Stadium in Pune.

Maharashtra have won Ranji Trophy twice and remained runners-up thrice, won Syed Mushtaq Ali Trophy once and remained runners-up once. In Vijay Hazare trophy it has been winner in West zone in 1994–95 and were runners up in 2022/23 season.

== History ==
Maharashtra was one of the 15 teams that competed in the first Ranji Trophy tournament in 1934–35, when, captained by D. B. Deodhar, it lost its inaugural match narrowly to Bombay. It has competed ever since, winning twice and finishing runners-up three times. Maharashtra won two consecutive Ranji trophies in 1939-40 and 1940-41 defeating United Province and Madras cricket team in the final respectively. It remained runner-up 3 times, in 1970-71 season it lost against Bombay cricket team, in 1992-93 against Punjab and in 2013-14 season versus Karnataka in the final and remained runner up.

Maharashtra's player Bhausaheb Nimbalkar scored record 443 in an inning in 1948 Ranji trophy, the record still stands and is still the highest Ranji trophy and first class score by an Indian.

As of February 2021 Maharashtra had played 395 times in the Ranji Trophy, winning 98, losing 75, and drawing 222 times.

In 1994-95 Vijay Hazare Trophy this team was winner of West zone.

Historically Maharashtra cricket team has been played its home matches at Poona Gymkhana Ground, Nehru stadium in Pune. Since Maharashtra cricket association built its own International cricket stadium at Gahunje outside Pune, it plays its home matches at 'Maharashtra Cricket Association stadium' (also known as MCA stadium).

Maharashtra team won its first Syed Mushtaq Ali Trophy, a premier T20 domestic cricket tournament in 2009–10. It defeated Hyderabad cricket team in the final by 19 runs. In 2018-19 season it lost against Karnataka cricket team in the final.

In 2022/23 Vijay Hazare Trophy, Maharashtra team had their best run in history but lost the finals to Saurashtra, Ruturaj Gaikwad captaining the side for the first time was the leading run getter for the side, he hit a tremendous knock of 220 runs of 159 deliveries not out vs Uttar Pradesh in quarterfinals, hitting a record-breaking 7 sixes in an over off Shiva Singh's bowling.

== Grounds ==
=== MCA Stadium, Pune ===
Owner and operated by the Maharashtra Cricket Association, it is the main home ground of the team. It boasts an impressive outdoor cricket field encircled by elliptical-shaped bleachers supported on sturdy racking beams. These bleachers are organized into two tiers, an upper and lower level, collectively providing seating for up to 45,000 enthusiastic spectators. Established in 2012, This stadium has hosted many International cricket games including Cricket World Cup games and is also the secondary home-ground for the Chennai Super Kings in Indian Premier League.

=== Nehru Stadium, Pune ===
Formerly known as Club of Maharashtra Ground, It was established in 1969 and has a capacity of 25,000 people, it was the main home-ground for the team during a period, in 2007 due to some disputes between state association and Pune Municipal Corporation regarding ticket allocation, led to an international match between India and Sri Lanka to be shifted to Kolkata, Following this the MCA decided a new stadium was needed and began the planning and construction for MCA Stadium. It also has hosted few of Cricket World Cup games.

=== Hutatma Anant Kanhere Maidan, Nashik ===
Formerly known as the Golf Club Ground. The ground is named after Hutatma Anant Kanhere, who was a freedom-fighter from Nasik. This was home ground for Maharashtra cricket team since the dispute over the Nehru Stadium in Pune until the new stadium was constructed in Pune. This ground still hosts domestic games for Maharashtra team.

=== Indira Gandhi Stadium, Solapur ===
The Indira Gandhi Stadium is located in Solapur, and has a capacity of 30,000 spectators, the venue is named after Indira Gandhi, the fourth prime minister of India. This stadium still hosts domestic games and is equipped with modern facilities as well.

=== Deccan Gymkhana Ground, Pune ===
Located in Deccan Gymkhana area of Pune, the Deccan Gymkhana and its grounds were founded in October 1906, This sports ground/club has hosted Davis Cup and had hosted the older (2009–12) Maharashtra premier league games.

== Honours ==
Year	Final Result	Most Runs	Most Wickets
Ranji Trophy
1939–40	Champions	Vijay Hazare (619)	Vijay Hazare (20)
1940–41	Champions	Vijay Hazare (565)	Chandrasekhar Sarwate (24)
1970–71	Runners-up	Hemant Kanitkar (687)	Vithal Joshi (45)
1992–93	Runners-up	Santosh Jedhe (867)	Santosh Jedhe (37)
2013–14	Runners-up	Kedar Jadhav (1223)	Shrikant Mundhe (34)
Wills Trophy
1986-87	Runners-up	Shrikant Kalyani (176)	Sunil Gudge (9)
Vijay Hazare Trophy
2022-23	Runners-up	Ruturaj Gaikwad (660)	Rajvardhan Hangargekar (15)
Syed Mushtaq Ali Trophy
2009-10	Champions	Rohit Motwani (147)	Ganesh Gaikwad (11)
2018-19	Runners-up	Naushad Shaikh (335)	Satyajeet Bachhav (20)

• Source - Cricinfo & The Association of Cricket and Historians

== Famous players ==
Players who have represented India
Player	Formats	Debut
Vijay Hazare	Test	1946
Ranga Sohoni	Test	1946
Madhusudan Rege	Test	1949
Nana Joshi	Test	1951
Chandu Borde	Test	1952
Sadashiv Patil	Test	1955
Bapu Nadkarni	Test	1955
Vasant Ranjane	Test	1958
Chetan Chauhan	Test/ODI	1969
Hemant Kanitkar	Test	1974
Hrishikesh Kanitkar	Test/ODI	1997
Yajurvindra Singh	Test	1997
Iqbal Siddiqui	Test	2001
Abhijit Kale	ODI	2003
Munaf Patel	Test/ODI/T20I	2006
Kedar Jadhav	ODI/T20I	2014
Ruturaj Gaikwad	ODI/T20I	2021
Rahul Tripathi	T20I	2023

=== Other Notable Maharashtra cricketers ===
- D. B. Deodhar (1935–1946)
- Krishnarao Jadhav (1937–1947)
- B. B. Nimbalkar - Primarily played for Holkar
- Sher Mohammad (1955–1965)
- Madhukar Gupte (1961–1977)
- Dnyaneshwar Agashe
- Nicholas Saldanha (1963–1977)
- Anwar Shaikh (1965–1977)
- Rajendra Bhalekar (1972–1985)
- Milind Gunjal (1978–1993)
- Sunil Gudge (1979–1996)
- Surendra Bhave (1986–2001)
- Shantanu Sugwekar (1987–2001)
- Santosh Jedhe
- Ashutosh Agashe
- Dheeraj Jadhav (1999–2007)
- Harshad Khadiwale (2006–2017)
- Shrikant Mundhe (2007–2019)
- Rohit Motwani (2007–2019)
- Samad Fallah (2007–2019)
- Ankit Bawne (2007–present)
- Akshay Darekar (2010–2019)
- Domnic Joseph (2011–2019)
- Satyajeet Bachhav (2012–2026)
- Nikhil Naik (2013–2026)

== Current squad ==
Players with international caps are listed in bold.

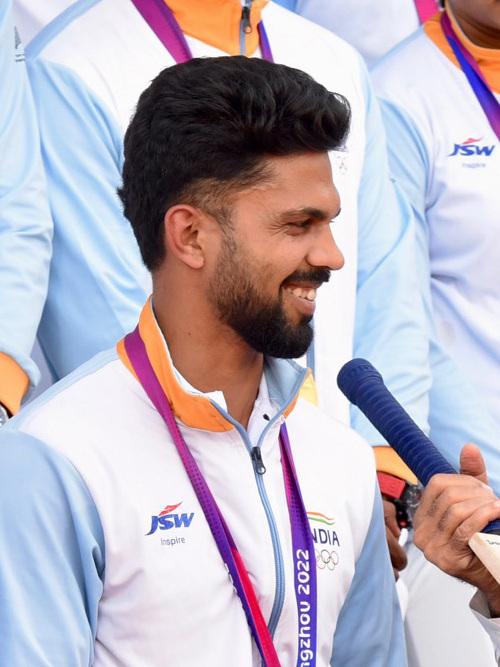
Ruturaj Gaikwad captain of Maharashtra in Twenty20 and List-A

Name	Birth date	Batting style	Bowling style	Formats	Notes
Batsmen
**Prithvi Shaw**	9 November 1999 (age 27)	Right-handed	Right-arm off break	First-class, List A, & Twenty20	**First-class Captain**; Plays for **Delhi Capitals** in IPL
Ankit Bawne	17 December 1992 (age 33)	Right-handed	Right-arm off break	First-class & List A	
**Ruturaj Gaikwad**	31 January 1997 (age 29)	Right-handed	Right-arm off break	First-class, List A, & Twenty20	**List A & Twenty20 Captain**; Plays for **Chennai Super Kings** in IPL
**Rahul Tripathi**	2 March 1991 (age 35)	Right-handed	Right-arm off break	List A & Twenty20	
Sachin Dhas	3 February 2005 (age 21)	Right-handed	Right-arm off break	First-class	
Sahil Parakh	7 June 2007 (age 19)	Left-handed	Right-arm leg break	Twenty20	
Digvijay Patil	13 August 2005 (age 21)	Right-handed	Right-arm off break	First-class	
Harshal Kate	12 October 2001 (age 25)	Right-handed	Right-arm medium	First-class	
All-rounders
Arshin Kulkarni	15 February 2005 (age 21)	Right-handed	Right-arm medium	First-class, List A, & Twenty20	Plays for **Lucknow Super Giants** in IPL
Siddhesh Veer	21 February 2001 (age 25)	Left-handed	Right-arm off break	First-class & List A	
Kiran Chormale	11 October 2005 (age 21)	Right-handed	Right-arm off break	Twenty20	
Wicket-keepers
Saurabh Nawale	27 December 1999 (age 26)	Right-handed		First-class & List A	
Nikhil Naik	9 November 1994 (age 32)	Right-handed		List A	
Suraj Shinde	18 September 1996 (age 30)	Right-handed		Twenty20	
Spin Bowlers
Vicky Ostwal	1 September 2002 (age 24)	Right-handed	Slow left arm orthodox	First-class, List A, & Twenty20	Plays for **Royal Challengers Bengaluru** in IPL
Prashant Solanki	22 February 2000 (age 26)	Right-handed	Right-arm leg break	List A & Twenty20	Plays for **Kolkata Knight Riders** in IPL
Hitesh Walunj	3 April 1993 (age 33)	Right-handed	Slow left arm orthodox	First-class	
Pace Bowlers
Ramakrishna Ghosh	28 August 1997 (age 29)	Right-handed	Right-arm medium	First-class, List A, & Twenty20	Plays for **Chennai Super Kings** in IPL
Rajvardhan Hangargekar	10 November 2002 (age 24)	Right-handed	Right-arm medium	First-class & List A	
Pradeep Dadhe	13 September 1994 (age 32)	Right-handed	Right-arm medium	First-class & List A	
Mukesh Choudhary	6 July 1996 (age 30)	Left-handed	Left-arm medium	First-class, List A, & Twenty20	Plays for **Chennai Super Kings** in IPL
Tanay Sanghvi	13 September 2000 (age 26)	Left-handed	Right-arm medium	First-class & Twenty20	

• Updated as on 17 November 2026, according to Cricinfo

== Coaching staff ==
Role	Staff
Head Coach	Harshad Khadiwale
Bowling Coach	Samad Fallah
Fielding Coach	Amit Patil
S&C Coach	Mahesh Patil
Side Armer	Nilesh Shinde
Physio	Pankaj Chopade
Masseur	Neeraj Thorat
Video Analyst	Swwapnil Kadaam
Team Manager	Mandar Dedge

• Source - Maharashtra Cricket Association

== See also ==
- Sport in India - overview of sport in India
- Cricket in India
