= 1985 World Championship of Cricket final =

1985 World Championship of Cricket Final
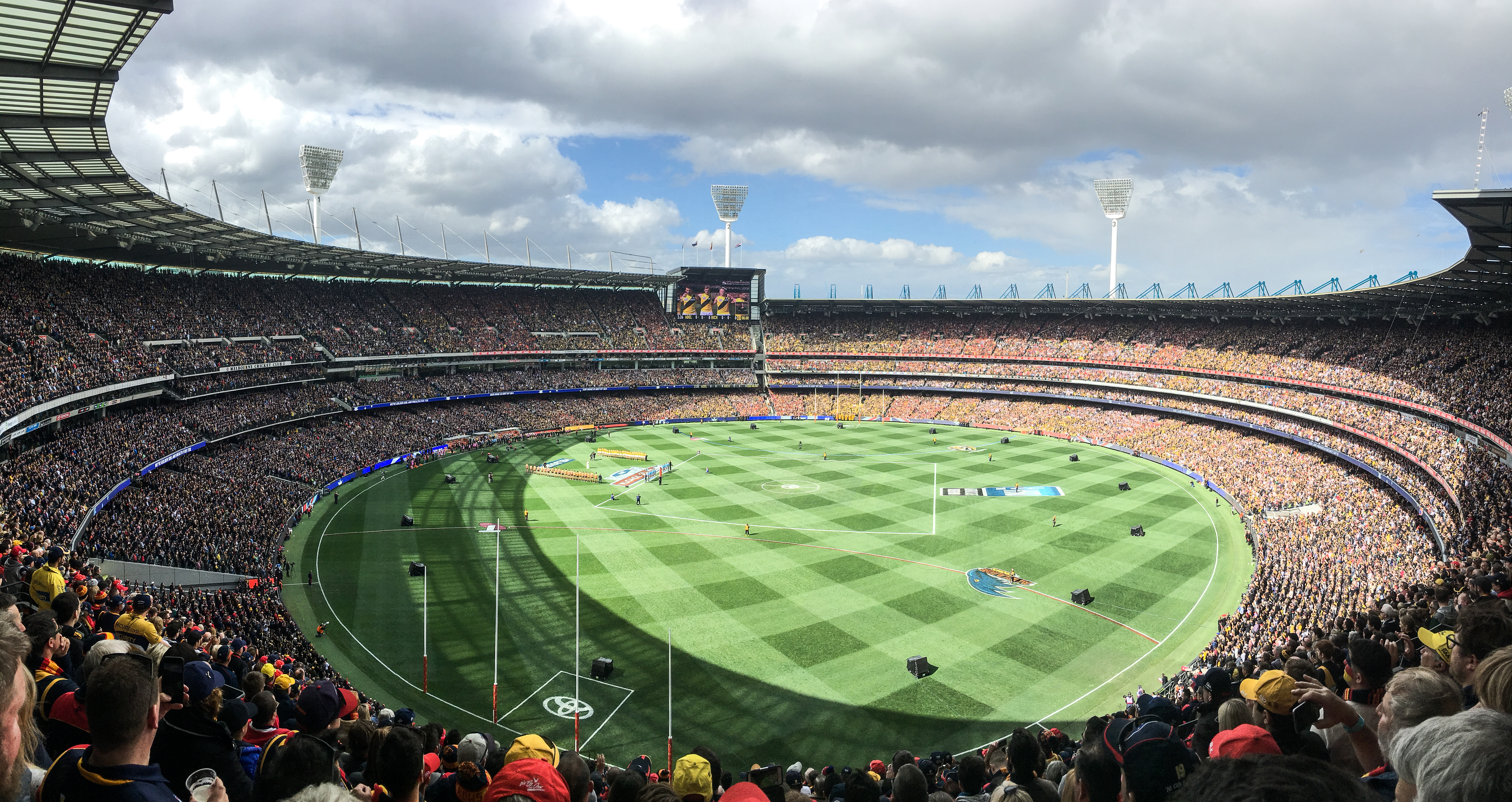
- Melbourne Cricket Ground
- Event: World Championship of Cricket
Pakistan	India
(Pakistan)	(India)
176/9	177/2
50 overs	47.1 overs
- India won by 8 wickets
- Date: 10 March 1985
- Venue: Melbourne Cricket Ground, Melbourne
- Player of the match: Krishnamachari Srikkanth (Ind)

The 1985 World Championship of Cricket final was a One Day International (ODI) match played on 10 March 1985 between India and Pakistan at the Melbourne Cricket Ground, Melbourne. Popularly known as World Championship of Cricket, this ODI tournament was held from 17 February to 10 March 1985 in Australia and it marked the culmination of the only World Championship of Cricket with India defeating Pakistan by 8 wickets.

== Road to the Final ==
India reached the final by defeating New Zealand by seven wickets.

After the group stages, the expected outcome was that the 1983 Cricket World Cup finalists India and West Indies would meet again in the final of the World Championship. India held up their end of the bargain by beating New Zealand in the first semi final, however Pakistan produced the one major upset of the tournament to beat West Indies by seven wickets.

== Details ==
Heading into the match, Pakistan had to play Azeem Hafeez instead of Wasim Akram, from their semi-final victory over West Indies while India made one change with Chetan Sharma replacing Roger Binny from their victory over New Zealand. Pakistan skipper Javed Miandad won the toss and elected to bat. Kapil Dev had Pakistan reeling at 29/3 as he dismissed Mudassar Nazar, Mohsin Khan and Qasim Umar. Soon Rameez Raja was dismissed by Sharma cheaply, but Captain Javed Miandad and Imran Khan steadied Pakistan with 68 runs partnership after both had been controversially given not out by umpire Raymond Isherwood, having edged deliveries to the wicketkeeper. Ironically for India, Imran was yet to open his account. Finally the partnership was broken as Imran was run out for 35. Later Saleem Malik and Javed Miandad, both got dismissed by L Sivaramakrishnan with the same score reading 131.

At one stage, Pakistan were 145/9 in 42 overs, but Wasim Raja, the last official batsman for Pakistan remained unbeaten on 21 as he pushed the score with the help of tailender Azeem Hafeez. At the end of the stipulated 50 overs, Pakistan made only 176 for 9, a below par score in a final. For India, Kapil Dev claimed three wickets, While Sharma, Madan Lal and Mohinder Amarnath had economical spell of under 3 runs per over. 19-year-old leg spinner Laxman Sivaramakrishnan had been a revelation during the tournament and produced another superb spell in the final claiming 3 wickets. It was the first time, in the tournament, that India had failed to bowl out the opposition. India bagged 49 out of a maximum possible 50 wickets in the tournament.

Indian openers Ravi Shastri and Krishnamachari Srikkanth, each had wonderful tournament and chasing the target of 177 to win, their century opening stand did most of the work for their strong batting line-up. Finally Srikkanth was dismissed for 67 by Imran. Azharuddin had a 39 runs partnership with Shastri before being dismissed for 25. Ravi Shastri and Vengsarkar remained unbeaten on 63 and 18 respectively as Indian chased down 177 in 47.1 overs. None of the Pakistan bowlers threatened Indian batsmen, even though Imran Khan, Azeem Hafeez, Tahir Naqqash and Mudassar Nazar had economical spells. For their consistency, at the end of the match, Srikkanth won the Player of the Match award, while Shastri was named the player of the tournament, or as it was known, the Champion of Champions. He was awarded his prize of an Audi 100 motor car, valued at A$35,000 and immediately drove it around the MCG with his entire team sitting either in or on the car The attendance of 35,296 in the match was the highest in Australia at a match in which the home side was not involved

== Scorecard ==
Pakistan batting
Player	Status	Runs	Balls	4s	6s	Strike rate
Mudassar Nazar	c Vishwanath b Kapil Dev	14	39	0	0	35.89
Mohsin Khan	c Azharuddin b Kapil Dev	5	17	4	0	29.41
Rameez Raja	c Srikkanth b Sharma	4	12	0	0	33.33
Qasim Umar	b Kapil Dev	0	1	0	0	0.00
Javed Miandad *	st Vishwanath b Sivaramakrishnan	48	92	2	0	52.17
Imran Khan	run out	35	67	2	0	52.23
Saleem Malik	c Sharma b Sivaramakrishnan	14	14	0	0	100.00
Wasim Raja	not out	21	26	1	0	80.76
Tahir Naqqash	c Vishwanath b Shastri	10	8	1	0	125.00
Anil Dalpat†	c Shastri b Sivaramakrishnan	0	2	0	0	0.00
Azeem Hafeez	not out	7	28	0	0	25.00
Extras	(b 7) (lb 8) (nb 2) (w 1)	18				
Total	(9 wickets; 50 overs)	176				

Fall of wickets: 1-17 (Mohsin Khan), 2-29 (Mudassar Nazar), 3-29 (Qasim Umar), 4-33 (Ramiz Raja), 5-101 (Imran Khan), 6-131 (Saleem Malik), 7-131 (Javed Miandad), 8-142 (Tahir Naqqash), 9-145 (Anil Dalpat)

India bowling
Bowler	Overs	Maidens	Runs	Wickets	Econ	Wides	NBs
Kapil Dev	9	1	23	3	2.55	{{{wides}}}	{{{no-balls}}}
Chetan Sharma	7	1	17	1	2.42	{{{wides}}}	{{{no-balls}}}
Madan Lal	6	1	15	0	2.50	{{{wides}}}	{{{no-balls}}}
M Amarnath	9	0	27	0	3.00	{{{wides}}}	{{{no-balls}}}
Ravi Shastri	10	0	44	1	4.40	{{{wides}}}	{{{no-balls}}}
L Sivaramakrishnan	9	0	35	3	3.88	{{{wides}}}	{{{no-balls}}}

India batting
Player	Status	Runs	Balls	4s	6s	Strike rate
Ravi Shastri	not out	63	148	3	0	42.56
K Srikkanth	c Wasim Raja b Imran Khan	67	77	6	2	87.01
M Azharuddin	b Tahir Naqqash	25	26	3	0	96.15
DB Vengsarkar	not out	18	32	0	0	56.25
SM Gavaskar *	did not bat	0	0	0	0	00.00
Mohinder Amarnath	did not bat	0	0	0	0	00.00
Kapil Dev	did not bat	0	0	0	0	00.00
Madan Lal	did not bat	0	0	0	0	00.00
Chetan Sharma	did not bat	0	0	0	0	00.00
Sadanand Viswanath†	did not bat	0	0	0	0	00.00
L Sivaramakrishnan	did not bat	0	0	0	0	00.00
Extras	(lb 2, w 2)	4				
Total	(2 wickets; 47.1 overs)	177				

Fall of wickets: 1-103 (Kris Srikkanth), 2-142 (Mohammad Azharuddin)

Pakistan bowling
Bowler	Overs	Maidens	Runs	Wickets	Econ	Wides	NBs
Imran Khan	10	3	28	1	2.80	{{{wides}}}	{{{no-balls}}}
Azeem Hafeez	10	1	29	0	2.29	{{{wides}}}	{{{no-balls}}}
Tahir Naqqash	10	2	35	1	3.50	{{{wides}}}	{{{no-balls}}}
Wasim Raja	7.1	0	42	0	5.86	{{{wides}}}	{{{no-balls}}}
Mudassar Nazar	8	0	26	0	3.25	{{{wides}}}	{{{no-balls}}}
Saleem Malik	2	0	15	0	7.50	{{{wides}}}	{{{no-balls}}}
