= World Championship of Cricket =

International cricket tournament

1985 World Championship of Cricket
- Dates: 17 February – 10 March 1985
- Administrator: Australian Cricket Board
- Cricket format: One Day International
- Tournament format(s): Group stage and Knockout
- Host: Australia
- Champions: India (1st title)
- Runners-up: Pakistan
- Participants: 7
- Matches: 13
- Player of the series: (India) Ravi Shastri
- Most runs: (India) Krishnamachari Srikkanth (238)
- Most wickets: (India) Laxman Sivaramakrishnan (10)

Australia
Australia kit

England
England kit

India
India kit

New Zealand
New Zealand kit

Pakistan
Pakistan kit

Sri Lanka
Sri Lanka kit

West Indies
West Indies kit

The Benson & Hedges World Championship of Cricket was part of the celebrations commemorating the 150th anniversary of European settlement in the Australian state of Victoria. It was a One Day International (ODI) tournament held in Australia from 17 February to 10 March 1985. India defeated Pakistan in the final by 8 wickets.

All of the then seven Test match playing teams participated with matches played at the Melbourne Cricket Ground and the Sydney Cricket Ground. The tournament saw the first matches played under lights at the Melbourne Cricket Ground. India were the reigning World Cup holders, having defeated West Indies in the 1983 Cricket World Cup Final, but the bookmakers installed West Indies as favourites. India were ultimately undefeated at the tournament, with Ravi Shastri named as the player of the tournament.

== Tournament format ==
Each team was required to name a 14-player squad for the tournament. Matches were played with coloured clothing, white balls, fielding restrictions and innings limited to 50 overs.

The seven teams were split into two qualifying groups. Each played a round-robin with two points awarded for a win and one point for a draw or tie. Teams on equal points were separated by run rate.

Cross-over semi finals were then played with the winner from each group playing the runner-up from the other group. The losers played in the Plate Winners Final while the winners contested the Final.

== Playing squads ==
=== Australia ===
Allan Border (captain), Terry Alderman, Peter Faulkner, Rodney Hogg, Kim Hughes, Dean Jones, Robbie Kerr, Geoff Lawson, Rod McCurdy, Craig McDermott, Simon O'Donnell, Wayne B. Phillips, Kepler Wessels, Graeme Wood.

=== England ===
David Gower (captain), Jonathan Agnew, Norman Cowans, Chris Cowdrey, Paul Downton, Phil Edmonds, Richard Ellison, Neil Foster, Graeme Fowler, Mike Gatting, Allan Lamb, Vic Marks, Martyn Moxon, Tim Robinson.

=== India ===
Sunil Gavaskar (captain), Mohinder Amarnath, Mohammad Azharuddin, Roger Binny, Kapil Dev, Madan Lal, Ashok Malhotra, Manoj Prabhakar, Chetan Sharma, Ravi Shastri, Laxman Sivaramakrishnan, Krishnamachari Srikkanth, Dilip Vengsarkar, Sadanand Viswanath.

=== New Zealand ===
Geoff Howarth (captain), John Bracewell, Lance Cairns, Ewen Chatfield, Jeremy Coney, Jeff Crowe, Martin Crowe, Richard Hadlee, Paul McEwan, John Reid, Ian Smith, Martin Snedden, John Wright.

=== Pakistan ===
Javed Miandad (captain), Anil Dalpat, Azeem Hafeez, Imran Khan, Mohsin Khan, Mudassar Nazar, Qasim Omar, Rameez Raja, Rashid Khan, Saleem Malik, Tahir Naqqash, Wasim Akram, Wasim Raja, Zaheer Abbas.

=== Sri Lanka ===
Duleep Mendis (captain), Ashantha de Mel, Somachandra de Silva, Roy Dias, Vinothen John, Uvais Karnain, Ranjan Madugalle, Arjuna Ranatunga, Rumesh Ratnayake, Ravi Ratnayeke, Amal Silva.

=== West Indies ===
Clive Lloyd (captain), Winston Davis, Jeff Dujon, Joel Garner, Larry Gomes, Roger Harper, Desmond Haynes, Michael Holding, Gus Logie, Malcolm Marshall, Thelston Payne, Viv Richards, Richie Richardson.

== Tournament results ==
=== Group A ===
The tournament began with Australia and England playing the first ever match under lights at the Melbourne Cricket Ground, in front of a crowd of 82,494. Australia won the match by seven wickets, but neither of them would make the semi-finals.

India quickly showed that it was on track to repeat its World Cup success with comfortable wins in each of its group matches, while Pakistan found a new hero in 18-year-old left-arm fast bowler Wasim Akram who took 5 for 21 against Australia.

| Team | Pts | Pld | W | L | RR |
|---|---|---|---|---|---|
| India | 6 | 3 | 3 | 0 | 4.42 |
| Pakistan | 4 | 3 | 2 | 1 | 4.39 |
| Australia | 2 | 3 | 1 | 2 | 3.98 |
| England | 0 | 3 | 0 | 3 | 3.41 |

17 February 1985 (D/N)
Scorecard

| England; 214/8 (49 overs) | v | Australia; 215/3 (45.2 overs) |
| Allan Lamb 53 (53); Geoff Lawson 3/31 (10 overs) | | Robbie Kerr 87 (126); Vic Marks 1/33 (7.2 overs) |

Australia won by 7 wickets
Melbourne Cricket Ground, Melbourne
Umpires: Tony Crafter (Aus) and Ray Isherwood (Aus)
Player of the match: Robbie Kerr (Aus)

- England won the toss and elected to bat.
- This was the first match played under floodlights at this venue. 82,494 people attended. Match reduced to 49 overs due to rain.

20 February 1985 (D/N)
Scorecard

| Pakistan; 183 (49.2 overs) | v | India; 184/4 (45.5 overs) |
| Qasim Umar 57 (102); Roger Binny 4/35 (8.2 overs) | | Mohammad Azharuddin 93* (135); Imran Khan 3/27 (10 overs) |

India won by 6 wickets
Melbourne Cricket Ground, Melbourne
Umpires: Peter McConnell (Aus) and Dick French (Aus)
Player of the match: Mohammad Azharuddin (Ind)

- Pakistan won the toss and elected to bat.
- Laxman Sivaramakrishnan (Ind) made his ODI debut.

24 February 1985
Scorecard

| Pakistan; 262/6 (50 overs) | v | Australia; 200 (42.3 overs) |
| Mohsin Khan 81 (109); Simon O'Donnell 2/42 (10 overs) | | Simon O'Donnell 74 (101); Wasim Akram 5/21 (8 overs) |

Pakistan won by 62 runs
Melbourne Cricket Ground, Melbourne
Umpires: Ray Isherwood (Aus) and Mel Johnson (Aus)
Player of the match: Wasim Akram (Pak)

- Australia won the toss and elected to field.

26 February 1985 (D/N)
Scorecard

| India; 235/9 (50 overs) | v | England; 149 (41.4 overs) |
| Kris Srikkanth 57 (53); Norman Cowans 3/59 (10 overs) | | Martyn Moxon 48 (86); Ravi Shastri 3/30 (10 overs) |

India won by 86 runs
Sydney Cricket Ground, Sydney
Umpires: Bruce Martin (Aus) and Dick French (Aus)
Player of the match: Kris Srikkanth (Ind)

- England won the toss and elected to field.

2 March 1985 (D/N)
Scorecard

| Pakistan; 213/8 (50 overs) | v | England; 146 (24.2 overs) |
| Mudassar Nazar 77 (102); Richard Ellison 3/42 (10 overs) | | Allan Lamb 81 (69); Tahir Naqqash 3/24 (4.2 overs) |

Pakistan won by 67 runs
Melbourne Cricket Ground, Melbourne
Umpires: Ray Isherwood (Aus) and Mel Johnson (Aus)
Player of the match: Allan Lamb (Eng)

- Pakistan won the toss and elected to bat.

3 March 1985
Scorecard

| Australia; 163 (49.3 overs) | v | India; 165/2 (36.1 overs) |
| Wayne Phillips 60 (92); Roger Binny 3/27 (7.3 overs) | | Kris Srikkanth 93* (115); Terry Alderman 1/38 (8 overs) |

India won by 8 wickets
Melbourne Cricket Ground, Melbourne
Umpires: Tony Crafter (Aus) and Peter McConnell (Aus)
Player of the match: Ravi Shastri (Ind)

- India won the toss and elected to field.

=== Group B ===
Group B was slightly farcical with West Indies being comfortably the number one team in world cricket at the time and Sri Lanka being comfortably at the bottom of the list of Test nations.

The match between West Indies and New Zealand was rained off which meant that whoever was more successful in beating up on Sri Lanka would top the group. While West Indies easily accounted for Sri Lanka on the scoreboard, fast bowler Rumesh Ratnayake forced both Richie Richardson and Larry Gomes to retire with searing bouncers.

| Team | Pts | Pld | W | L | NR | RR |
|---|---|---|---|---|---|---|
| West Indies | 3 | 2 | 1 | 0 | 1 | 5.87 |
| New Zealand | 3 | 2 | 1 | 0 | 1 | 4.07 |
| Sri Lanka | 0 | 2 | 0 | 2 | 0 | 3.16 |

19 February 1985 (D/N)
Scorecard

| New Zealand; 57/2 (18.4 overs) | v | West Indies |
| John Reid 22 (30); Joel Garner 1/11 (6 overs) |

No result
Sydney Cricket Ground, Sydney
Umpires: Steve Randell (Aus) and Mel Johnson (Aus)

- New Zealand won the toss and elected to bat.
- No play was possible on the original day due to rain. The reserve day was used - moved from 20 February to 21 February due to a clash in television scheduling. However, further rain saw the match end with no result.

23 February 1985 (D/N)
Scorecard

| New Zealand; 223 (49.4 overs) | v | Sri Lanka; 172 (42.4 overs) |
| John Reid 62 (108); Vinothen John 3/29 (10 overs) | | Arjuna Ranatunga 34 (40); Jeremy Coney 4/46 (10 overs) |

New Zealand won by 51 runs
Melbourne Cricket Ground, Melbourne
Umpires: Bruce Martin (Aus) and Peter McConnell (Aus)
Player of the match: John Reid (NZ)

- Sri Lanka won the toss and elected to field.

27 February 1985 (D/N)
Scorecard

| Sri Lanka; 135/7 (47 overs) | v | West Indies; 136/2 (23.1 overs) |
| Ravi Ratnayeke 50 (101); Viv Richards 3/27 (9 overs) | | Desmond Haynes 36 (50); Rumesh Ratnayake 1/29 (7 overs) |

West Indies won by 8 wickets
Melbourne Cricket Ground, Melbourne
Umpires: Tony Crafter (Aus) and Steve Randell (Aus)
Player of the match: Ravi Ratnayeke

- Sri Lanka won the toss and elected to bat.
- Match reduced to 47 overs per side each due to rain.

== Knockout stage ==
=== Semi-finals ===
After the group stages, the expected outcome was that 1983 World Cup finalists India and West Indies would meet again in the final of the World Championship. India held up their end of the bargain by beating New Zealand in the first semi final, but Pakistan produced the one major upset of the tournament to beat West Indies.

=== 1st Semifinal ===
5 March 1985 (D/N)
Scorecard

| New Zealand; 206 (50 overs) | v | India; 207/3 (43.3 overs) |
| John Reid 55 (101); Madan Lal 4/37 (8 overs) | | Dilip Vengsarkar 63*(59); Ewen Chatfield 1/38 (10 overs) |

India won by 7 wickets
Sydney Cricket Ground, Sydney
Umpires: Peter McConnell (Aus) and Dick French (Aus)
Player of the match: Ravi Shastri

- India won the toss and elected to field.

=== 2nd Semifinal ===
6 March 1985 (D/N)
Scorecard

| West Indies; 159 (44.3 overs) | v | Pakistan; 160/3 (46 overs) |
| Roger Harper 25 (41); Mudassar Nazar 5/28 (7.3 overs) | | Ramiz Raja 60 (88); Joel Garner 1/19 (8 overs) |

Pakistan won by 7 wickets
Melbourne Cricket Ground, Melbourne
Umpires: Steve Randell (Aus) and Ray Isherwood (Aus)
Player of the match: Mudassar Nazar

- West Indies won the toss and elected to bat.

=== Consolation Final ===
The third place play-off in this tournament was known as the Plate Winners Final and West Indies were awarded a plate for winning the match. Geoff Howarth was nearing the end of his time as New Zealand captain and New Zealand's upcoming test and ODI tour to West Indies, which commenced later that month, would be his last series for the country. Richard Hadlee began with a spell of 2 for 8 in 6 overs. Viv Richards, then hit 51 off 61 deliveries.

9 March 1985
Scorecard

| New Zealand; 138/9 (50 overs) | v | West Indies; 139/4 (37.2 overs) |
| Jeremy Coney 35 (76); Joel Garner 3/29 (10 overs) | | Viv Richards 51 (61); Richard Hadlee 3/23 (10 overs) |

West Indies won by 6 wickets
Sydney Cricket Ground, Sydney
Umpires: Dick French (Aus) and Mel Johnson (Aus)
Player of the match: Joel Garner (WI)

- West Indies won the toss and elected to field.

== 1985 World Championship of Cricket Final ==
India got on top early in the final with Kapil Dev reducing Pakistan to 4 for 33 before Javed Miandad and Imran Khan began a rescue act after both had been controversially given not out having edged deliveries to the wicketkeeper. 19-year-old leg spinner Laxman Sivaramakrishnan had been a revelation during the tournament and produced another superb spell in the final. Pakistan's eventual total of 9 for 176 constituted a good recovery. It was the first time, in the tournament, that India had failed to bowl out the opposition. India bagged 49 out of a maximum possible 50 wickets in the tournament.

Indian openers Ravi Shastri and Krishnamachari Srikkanth each had wonderful tournaments and their century opening stand did most of the work for their strong batting line-up. Each were rewarded at the end of the match with Srikkanth winning the Player of the Match award and Shastri being named the player of the tournament, or as it was known, the Champion of Champions. He was awarded his prize of an Audi 100 motor car, valued at A$35,000 and immediately drove it around the MCG with his entire team sitting either in or on the car. The attendance of 35,296 in the match was the highest in Australia in a match not involving the home side.

10 March 1985 (D/N)
Scorecard

| Pakistan; 176/9 (50 overs) | v | India; 177/2 (47.1 overs) |
| Javed Miandad 48 (92); Kapil Dev 3/23 (9 overs) | | Kris Srikkanth 67 (77); Imran Khan 1/28 (10 overs) |

India won by 8 wickets
Melbourne Cricket Ground, Melbourne
Umpires: Tony Crafter (Aus) and Ray Isherwood (Aus)
Player of the match: Kris Srikkanth (Ind)

- Pakistan won the toss and elected to bat.

This was the only instance of the World Championship of Cricket. The Indian team that won the cup was adjudged by Wisden as 'The Indian Team of the Century'.
