= Pakistani cricket team in Australia in 1983–84 =

International cricket tour

The Pakistan national cricket team toured Australia in the 1983–84 season and played 5 Test matches against Australia. Australia won the series 2–0.

== Test series summary ==
=== First Test ===
11–14 November 1983
(5-day match)
Scorecard

Australia	v	Pakistan
436/9d (125.3 overs); WB Phillips 159 (246); Azeem Hafeez 5/100 (27.3 overs)		129 (40.2 overs); Qasim Umar 48 (100); CG Rackemann 5/32 (8 overs)
		298 (98.1 overs); Qasim Umar 65 (149); CG Rackemann 6/86 (26 overs)

Australia won by an innings and 9 runs
Western Australia Cricket Association Ground, Perth
Umpires: MW Johnson and PJ McConnell
Player of the match: CG Rackemann (AUS)

- Pakistan won the toss and elected to field.
- The match was scheduled for five days but completed in four.
- WB Phillips (AUS) made his Test debut.

=== Second Test ===
25–29 November 1983
(5-day match)
Scorecard

Pakistan	v	Australia
156 (50.1 overs); Zaheer Abbas 56 (76); GF Lawson 5/49 (17.1 overs)		509/7d (155 overs); GS Chappell 150* (250); Rashid Khan 3/129 (43 overs)
82/3 (23 overs); Mohsin Khan 37 (44); CG Rackemann 2/31 (8 overs)

Match drawn
Brisbane Cricket Ground, Woolloongabba, Brisbane
Umpires: RA French and MW Johnson
Player of the match: GF Lawson (AUS)

- Pakistan won the toss and elected to bat.
- There was no play on the final day.

=== Third Test ===
9–13 December 1983
(5-day match)
Scorecard

Australia	v	Pakistan
465 (122.2 overs); KC Wessels 179 (233); Azeem Hafeez 5/167 (38.2 overs)		624 (191.2 overs); Mohsin Khan 149 (296); DK Lillee 6/171 (50.2 overs)
310/7 (129 overs); KJ Hughes 106 (245); Azeem Hafeez 2/50 (19 overs)

Match drawn
Adelaide Oval, Adelaide
Umpires: AR Crafter and RA French
Player of the match: KJ Hughes (AUS)

- Australia won the toss and elected to bat.

=== Fourth Test ===
26–30 December 1983
(5-day match)
Scorecard

Pakistan	v	Australia
470 (140.4 overs); Mohsin Khan 152 (239); JN Maguire 3/111 (29 overs)		555 (189.3 overs); GN Yallop 268 (517); Abdul Qadir 5/166 (54.3 overs)
238/7 (100 overs); Imran Khan 72* (153); DK Lillee 3/71 (29 overs)

Match drawn
Melbourne Cricket Ground, Melbourne
Umpires: AR Crafter and PJ McConnell
Player of the match: GN Yallop (AUS)

- Pakistan won the toss and elected to bat.
- JN Maguire and GRJ Matthews (both AUS) made their Test debuts.

=== Fifth Test ===
2–6 January 1984
(5-day match)
Scorecard

Pakistan	v	Australia
278 (100.2 overs); Mudassar Nazar 84 (169); GF Lawson 5/59 (25 overs)		454/6d (154 overs); GS Chappell 182 (400); Mudassar Nazar 3/81 (31 overs)
210 (70.5 overs); Javed Miandad 60 (129); GF Lawson 4/48 (20 overs)		35/0 (5.4 overs); WB Phillips 19* (23)

Australia won by 10 wickets
Sydney Cricket Ground, Sydney
Umpires: RA French and MW Johnson
Player of the match: GS Chappell (AUS)

- Australia won the toss and elected to field.

== External sources ==
- CricketArchive – tour summaries

== Annual reviews ==
- Playfair Cricket Annual 1984
- Wisden Cricketers' Almanack 1984
