= Andrew Courtice =

Australian cricketer

Personal information
- Full name: Brian Andrew Courtice
- Born: 30 March 1961 (age 65); Brisbane, Queensland, Australia
- Batting: Right-handed
- Bowling: Right-arm medium-pace

Domestic team information
- Years: Team
- 1982–83 to 1987–88: Queensland

Career statistics
Competition	FC	LA
Matches	49	16
Runs scored	2,758	468
Batting average	34.91	31.20
100s/50s	4/18	1/2
Top score	144	105
Balls bowled	510	144
Wickets	1	1
Bowling average	237.00	72.00
5 wickets in innings	0	0
10 wickets in match	0	–
Best bowling	1/42	1/3
Catches/stumpings	37/–	2/–
- Source: Cricinfo, 6 July 2023

Brian Andrew Courtice (born 30 March 1961) is an Australian cricketer. He played in 49 first-class and 16 List A matches for Queensland between 1982 and 1988.

Born in Brisbane, Courtice attended Brisbane Boys' College and the University of Queensland. He was an opening batsman. He made his highest first-class score of 144 in the 1983–84 Sheffield Shield, when he and Robbie Kerr put on 289 for the first wicket against Victoria. In 1985–86 he toured Zimbabwe with the Young Australia XI, when he also opened the batting with Kerr.

Courtice left first-class cricket in the late 1980s when he decided to concentrate on his law studies. He was 26 when he played his last match for Queensland. He set a record for the Queensland Cricket Association competition in 1992–93 when he scored 949 runs in a season.

Courtice is the managing director of his own legal practice, Courtice Legal in Brisbane.
