= Wayne B. Phillips =

Australian cricketer

Wayne Phillips
Personal information
- Full name: Wayne Bentley Phillips
- Born: 1 March 1958 (age 68); Adelaide, South Australia
- Nickname: Flipper
- Batting: Left-handed
- Role: Wicket keeper

International information
- National side: Australia
- Test debut (cap 320): 11 November 1983 v Pakistan
- Last Test: 13 March 1986 v New Zealand
- ODI debut (cap 69): 22 October 1982 v Pakistan
- Last ODI: 29 March 1986 v New Zealand

Domestic team information
- Years: Team
- 1977/78–1990/91: South Australia

Career statistics
Competition	Test	ODI	FC	LA
Matches	27	48	114	83
Runs scored	1,485	852	6,907	1,804
Batting average	32.28	24.34	37.74	28.18
100s/50s	2/7	0/6	13/33	1/13
Top score	159	75*	260	135
Catches/stumpings	52/–	42/7	154/7	70/8
- Source: CricInfo, 24 August 2011

Wayne Bentley Phillips (born 1 March 1958) is a former Australian cricketer who played in 27 Test matches and 48 One Day Internationals (ODIs) between 1982 and 1986 as a batsman and wicket-keeper. He played for South Australia between 1978 and 1991.

== Early career ==
Phillips played cricket as a wicketkeeper at high school, but concentrated on batting once he made his South Australian Premier Cricket debut with Sturt Cricket Club. He would occasionally keep wicket and was a reserve wicketkeeper with Australian Under-19 team. However his club, Sturt, had the South Australian state keeper, Russell Vincent, so Phillips became a specialist batsman.

He made his first class debut during the 1977–78 season, when the state sides had been depleted due to World Series Cricket. Over the summer Phillips played three Sheffield Shield matches and a single one-day match as a middle-order batsman, with a top score of 22.

Phillips did not play state cricket again until the 1980–81 season. He was selected in the one day team to play in the McDonald's Cup and began as an opener when "South Australia needed a fast runner to between wickets to partner Rick Darling. I took on the job because they were a bit short on openers." Phillips was picked for South Australia's last match of the Sheffield Shield. He made the most of his opportunity, scoring 111 and 91 against Victoria.

Phillips established himself as an opening batsman over the 1981–82 season scoring 857 first class runs at an average of 47.61, forming a strong opening combination with Rick Darling and making an important contribution to South Australia winning the Sheffield Shield that summer.

He scored a century against the visiting Pakistan side and 260 against Queensland – the first double century from a South Australian batsman in ten years.

=== 1982-83: Pakistan and Zimbabwe ===
These results saw Phillips selected in the Australian squad to tour Pakistan that winter as a batsman and reserve keeper. There was a spot open in the Australian batting line up as Greg Chappell had elected not to tour. Phillips was in competition with Greg Ritchie.

Phillips made his debut for Australia in a tour game against the BCCP Patron's XI. He played as wicketkeeper as Rod Marsh's arrival in Pakistan was delayed due to the birth of his son; Phillips scored 4 and 22. Greg Ritchie was picked for the ODIs and Tests. Phillips' next match was a tour game against the Pakistan Invitation XI, where he opened and played as wicketkeeper. He scored 92. This saw Phillips selected in the Australian side to play the 3rd ODI as a specialist batter. Unfortunately the game was called off due to a riot.

Phillips scored consistently throughout the 1982–83 season, scoring 680 runs at an average of 37.77. He made centuries against New South Wales and Tasmania. Graeme Wood was dropped as opener after the first Test, but his spot was given to Kepler Wessels, a South African batsman who had been in excellent form for Queensland for several seasons and only just become eligible for Australian selection.

Nonetheless, Phillips remained on the radar of Australian selectors. He was picked as 12th man for the 3rd Test, and selected in a Young Australian side to tour Zimbabwe in early 1983 as a wicketkeeper batsman, even though he did not keep for his state or club side.

The highlight of this tour for Phillips was scoring 135 in a one-day game. After this success, commentators started talking about Phillips as a possible Australian wicketkeeper.

== Test batsman ==
Phillips began the 1983–84 summer superbly with 234 against Tasmania and 75 against the touring Pakistan side. He was selected as opener in Australia's side for the first Test against Pakistan, replacing John Dyson and partnering Kepler Wessels. Bob Simpson wrote he felt Phillips "may well be a great success and I hope he is but as yet he hasn't earned his test berth."

Before the Test, he captained South Australia in a one-day game and also played as wicketkeeper, scoring 25. Phillips had an excellent Test debut, scoring 159 in the first innings, taking part in a 259 run partnership with Graham Yallop on the first day, and helping set up a huge Australian victory; he also took three catches.

He captained South Australia in a game against Queensland, scoring 14. In the rain-shortened second Test, Phillips scored 46. He made 1 and 21 for South Australia against WA, then made 12 and 54 in the third Test; his second innings half century helped Australia secure a draw. Phillips made 5 and 36 against NSW in a Shield game, then he scored 35 in the fourth Test and 37 and 19 not out in the fifth (hitting the winning runs); Phillips had made 362 runs in the series at an average of 60.33.

Phillips was selected in the Australian ODI series at the end of the 5th Test. He scored 10 and 2 in the first games. There had been calls that Rod Marsh should be dropped and replaced as keeper by Phillips. When Marsh scored a half century in an ODI he raised his bat in the direction of the press box. Phillips was then made 12th man, replaced by Greg Ritchie. However he was selected for the Australian squad to tour the West Indies. Ian Chappell wrote Australia needed someone "who is prepared to play his shots off the back foot and if Wayne Phillips can succeed with his aggressive attitude, this will give Australia a good start."

Phillips returned to the Australian ODI team when Rod Marsh injured a finger and Phillips replaced him as keeper. He briefly kept his place as a batter when Marsh returned to the side but then was dropped from the ODI side again. As the World Series Cup progressed, Steve Smith established himself as a successful ODI opener and Dean Jones as an ODI middle order player: Phillips was omitted from the 14-man Australian squad for the WSC finals against the West Indies. He was recalled to the team however and played in the last final, scoring 22 down the middle order and taking part in a 45 run stand with Rod Marsh in the latter's final international game.

== Wicket-keeper ==
=== 1984 tour of West Indies ===
Rod Marsh had retired as Australia's wicketkeeper at the end of the 1983–84 season and it was expected his replacement in the West Indies would be Roger Woolley, who kept wicket for the first two tour games. Phillips played as a specialist batsman in these matches. In the first, against Leeward Islands, he only made 27 and 23 (off 128 balls) although he and Wessels put on opening partnerships of 61 and 114 together. During the Leeward Island game, Phillips and Greg Ritchie were reprimanded for arriving 75 minutes late on day two. Peter McFarline, who was covering the tour for The Age, wrote Phllips "struggled to come to terms with the conditions. If ever a man has suffered from the restrictions of limited over cricket it is the left handed South Australian."

In the second tour game, against Guyana, Phillips made 1 and 62. In the second innings McFarline wrote that "Phillips, in the horrors, could do little right" at first but eventually began "to gather his shattered confidence and by the end of his 145 minute stay was stroking the ball with something like the timing that marked the beginning of his Australian career." However, during the same game Steve Smith scored centuries in both innings making him a favourite to partner Wessels.

In the first ODI, Phillips was picked as wicketkeeper - Roger Woolley had a chipped bone. He batted at seven while Smith scored 60. This led to assumptions that Phillips would be dropped for Smith in the first Test. However, Woolley's finger had not improved and the selectors felt having Phillips as keeper would strengthen Australia's batting. "We couldn't risk a keeper who was not 100% sure of his fitness," said Hughes. This allowed them to pick Smith as opener to bat alongside Kepler Wessels, with Phillips batting at number seven. Phillips had only kept in four first-class games beforehand, two in Pakistan and two during the 1982-83 summer.

Phillips' first catch as a Test wicketkeeper was Viv Richards, off the bowling of Rodney Hogg. He only made 16 in the first innings but top scored in Australia's second innings with 76, taking part in a 125 run partnership with Allan Border that helped save Australia from defeat. McFarline felt Phillips "stood in satisfactorily" as keeper "although his lack of experience keeping over five days showed on the last day" and noting that without Rod Marsh the team "looks lopsided".

Ian Chappell wrote that Phillips "should now spend every spare moment he has improving his wicketkeeping" and suggested "a toughening in Wayne's attitude as he is a likeable, easy going bloke who basically wouldn't want to put anyone's nose out of joint, never mind a job." Chappell thought Phillips should endeavour to be like Jeff Dujon, who started as a batsman then became a keeper. "Who knows," wrote Chappell, "with plenty of hard work and a touch of aggressive thinking... he might become another Rod Marsh."

"It's very hard to keep in a test match," said Phillips later. "There is enormous pressure on you at that level."

Phillips was picked as a specialist middle order batsman in the next tour game, against Trinidad and Tobago, while Wooley kept and Smith opened. Phillips made 19 and 12 not out, being at the wicket in the second innings during Kim Hughes' notorious "protest" against the local side, where he instructed batsmen to score slowly. At one point Phillips took off his pads and lay down on the field during the game.

Phillips played in the second ODI as wicketkeeper, scoring 10 runs in what was a rare Australian victory on the tour. After Steve Smith fell ill and was unable to play in the second Test, Phillips was promoted to opener (Dean Jones replaced Smith but batted down the order), but failed in two innings, scoring 4 and 0.

Phillips played as a specialist middle order batsman in a tour game against Barbados, making 21 and 52 not out (off 33 deliveries). While Woolley's injury had healed it was decided to keep Phillips as the keeper. Smith recovered for the third Test so Phillips was put back down the order again, this time at number eight, with Tom Hogan batting ahead of him. The move seemed to pay off in the first innings, Phillips scoring 120 runs, including 14 fours and 4 sixes, helping Australia set a competitive total of 429. Evan Whitton called it "one of the more astonishing innings of my experience... a masterpiece in the Jacksonian vein." McFarline wrote Phillips "put Australia in a position from which it could not lose the match." However Australia collapsed disastrously in the second innings for 91 (Phillips 1) and Australia lost by ten wickets. (Phillips also dropped a chance off Alderman in Australia's first innings.)

By the 4th Test openers Graeme Wood and Kepler Wessells were injured so Phillips had to open. Kim Hughes felt that Phillips could not keep as well so Woolley was recalled as a keeper and Phillips played as a specialist batsman (opening with Greg Ritchie); he only scored 5 and 22 (taking part in an opening stand of 50 off seven overs) and Australia lost by an innings and 30 runs.

In the 3rd ODI, which Australia lost, Phillips was a keeper and opener, scoring 0. Ian Chappell wrote after this game that "there is not a top class keeper in Australia at the moment and therefore Wayne Phillips has the chance to take the spot on the strength of his batting" but added that "If Phillips is to hold his position there (and his chances) he must be prepared to get a lot of bruises on his hands while practising his keeping." He supported the selection of Philllips as keeper because it would give the Australian team extra flexibility even allowing an extra bowler at times.

Peter McFarline wrote that Roger "Woolley's tour with the gloves has been as poor as I have seen in this class of cricket. It resulted in Wayne Phillips, a man of talent but not yet with the capacity to understand that talent, being placed in the position of keeping as well as opening the batting." McFarline felt that "if Phillips can improve behind the stumps this season at home... he will in time become a bonus, batting at number seven."

Phillips made 64 as an opener/keeper in a tour game against Jamaica, but only 13 in the 4th ODI. Woolley's form had been poor and Phillips was back at behind the stumps for the 5th Test, opening both innings as well, making only 12 and 2, and taking five catches. McFarline wrote "Phillips is a young man with a future, but not as an opening batsman where his angled bat makes him far too vulnerable to bowling of this pace." Summarising the tour, McFarline reiterated the series "improved his game enormously" but "showed conclusively that" Phillips was "not an opening batsman of standing in this class" and felt his "future lies at six or seven in the order. He needs to be given the keeping job for his state in order to make the improvement necessary to do the job for Australia in the future."

=== 1984–85 India tour ===
When Phillips returned to Australia he was told South Australia would persist with Kevin Wright as keeper and Phillips could only keep wicket in one day games. In response, Phillips said he would move to Western Australia. Phillips was then selected as first choice keeper for the 1984 tour of India as well as being one of the sixteen players (and the only wicketkeeper) contracted to the Australian Cricket Board. The South Australian selectors then reversed their decision and told Phillips he had a guaranteed selection to keep for the first three games that summer (a one-day match, a Shield game, and a tour match against the West Indies). This led to Wright retiring from first class cricket. "At no stage did I want to leave South Australia," said Phillips. "However in an attempt to consolidate my position as the Australian wicketkeeper the only option open to me was to leave."

"This tour will be a stepping stone to consolidate my position as the wicketkeeper in the Australian side," said Phillips of the India trip. "I don't have any illusions about my own ability. I don't expect to do the job Rod Marsh did but I'll do my best."

Phillips played in all games for the ODI series which Australia won 3-0 (two games were rained out) and is generally felt to have kept well, taking five stumpings in all off the bowling of Tom Hogan. In the last game he opened and scored 33 off 23 balls. He was quoted at the time saying:

From the Australian point of view, I can become the all-rounder. I don't bat and bowl but I bat and wicket-keep... Hopefully this tour will see the start of me becoming a specialist wicket-keeper. I realise I'm under enormous pressure, but I really believe I can prove I am as good as any specialist wicket-keeper in the country.

Jeff Dujon said "From what I saw in the West Indies, Wayne is good enough to do the job" of wicketkeeper but felt "it would be best that he didn't open the batting. In my opinion he is best suited to keeping and batting down the order."

=== 1984-85 summer ===
Phillips began the summer with a McDonald's Cup game against Queensland. He made 29 and 9 for South Australia against New South Wales, dropping John Dyson on 39 (he scored 70). He scored 0 and 2 (retired hurt) against the touring West Indies. Nonetheless, he was selected as wicketkeeper in the Australian side for the first Test. McFarline wrote that Phillips' recent form was "a worry" and that "he has been having an unhappy time with both bat and gloves in recent weeks and the blow to the face from Malcolm Marshall ... will hardly have filled him with confidence. Nevertheless Phillips has the potential to be an international class keeper and his batting skill is far above any of the other contenders." "I wasn't too flash for a while and had trouble focusing," admitted Phillips.

Bill O'Reilly wrote that Phillips "doesn't fill me with great hope yet as a batsman", attributing his debut Test century to being "extremely lucky to have Yallop with him carving up Qadir from the start" and that his wicketkeeping "doesn't inspire me with confidence."

In the first Test, Phillips took four catches in West Indies' first innings of 416, giving "an accomplished performance". Australia were dismissed for 76 with Phillips top scoring with 22, the only batter "who looked remotely capable of counter punching." The West Indies enforced the follow on and Phillips made 16, as Australia lost by an innings and 112 runs. Phillips later said "I was playing for my spot in that match and I had to perform to keep it."

Phillips then played for South Australia against Queensland in a Shield game, scoring 32 and 0. In the second Test, Phillips made 44, Australia's top score in its first innings of 175. The West Indies put on 424. Australia batted again and made 271, with Phillips making Australia's second top score, 54 off 50 balls. The West Indies won by eight wickets. Phillips was one of the few batsmen seen to be taking on the West Indies bowling.

Phillips played against NSW in a Shield game, scoring 20 and 13, and injuring the third finger in his right hand while fielding. He had to pull out of the Australian side for the third Test, requiring surgery, and was replaced by Steve Rixon who scored 58 and 115 not out in the same game. (Rixon was also more experienced keeping to Bob Holland, who was picked in the team.) Phillips wound up missing the fourth and fifth Tests as well (which Australia drew and won).

Once the Test series was over, Phillips resumed his position in the Australian side for the ODI series. Phillips had a very strong series in the one dayers. He hit 23 off 16 balls against the West Indies, and made 67 against Sri Lanka. This saw him briefly promoted to opener, but then he was put down the order again, making 36 off 37 balls against the West Indies. In a game against Sri Lanka, Phillips made four dismissals (including a stumping) and scored 75 off 68 balls.

In the first final, Phillips' innings of 50 helped (and 105 run partnership with Allan Border) set up a rare Australian victory over the West Indies. The Sydney Morning Herald said he played with "common sense and certainty."

Philips made 56 off 37 balls in the second final, which Australia lost Over 11 games Phillips made 336 runs with a strike rate of 97.95 - Australia's highest. He played for Australia in the World Championship of Cricket ODI series. Phillips scored 44 from 50 balls against Pakistan and 60 against India. Phillips withdrew from the 1985 tour of Sharjah as his wife was expecting their first child. He was replaced by Rixon.

Phillips was called "one of the few success stories this summer" - along with Kepler Wessels and Geoff Lawson - whose "aggressive batting... produced some useful counter attacks... Standing back as a keeper he was his usual agile self, though he sometimes found his technique wanting against the spinners. Nevertheless he has the ability to carve up any attack when in the mood."

=== 1985 Ashes ===
Bob Simpson, discussing possibilities for the 1985 Ashes, declared Steve Rixon to be "easily the best" wicketkeeper in Australia but felt Phillips should go too as "his batting earned him his spot over other contenders." Phillips and Rixon were selected for the 1985 Ashes.

Shortly after the squad was announced, news broke that several Australian players had signed to go to go on the rebel tours to South Africa over the 1985–86 and 1986–87 seasons, including Phillips. The tours were organised by former Test batsman, Bruce Francis, who later wrote that Phillips:

Disliked keeping and would have preferred to play for Australia as a top-order batsman. By the time the tour was being put together, he had become fed up with the pressures of the modern game and was determined to make as much money as he could, as quickly as he could, and then retire. It was a revelation to me that such a fine player could be so unenthusiastic about the game.

However Phillips, along with Dirk Wellham and Graeme Wood (who had also signed to go to South Africa and were part of the Ashes squad), changed his mind after a financial inducement from Kerry Packer. (Murray Bennett, who had also signed, changed his mind of his own accord.) For a time it was unsure whether the rest of the Australian players would agree to tour with Wellham, Phillips and Wood, but this was cleared up and the players were allowed to go to England.

Phillip began the tour strongly scoring 62 against Somerset, although he fell ill with a virus and had to be replaced during the game by Ray Phillips. He scored 66 in a one-day game against Surrey but a report on the game said "He is not gloving the ball with any confidence and he looked particularly unsettled... when taking Murray Bennett." (Australia missed 53 catches in international matches the previous summer.) Phillips scored 91 against Sussex but The Age reported "he performed with a lot less distinction behind the stumps. His old habit of snatching, rather than letting the ball glide into the gloves was evident" and "he was definitely at his most vulnerable when keeping to the spinners." Imran Khan wrote that he felt Phillips "was being wasted down the order" and should be promoted to four or five, as he was good against pace but less good against spin.

Phillips played as keeper in all three ODIs, which Australia won 2–1, then he scored 126 against Leicestershire. In the first Test Phillips scored 30 and 91 - his second innings (over three hours and 11 minutes) came close to saving the game for Australia. In the second Test Phillips made 21 in the first innings and came to the wicket in the second when Australia were 5/65 chasing 127 runs to win (Australia had famously lost two Tests due to second innings collapses during the 1981 Ashes). He scored 29 off 32 balls in a partnership of 51 runs with Allan Border, taking Australia in sight of victory. The Age called Phillips "superb in a crisis."

Phillips made 2 in the drawn third Test then played as a specialist batter against Gloucestershire. He scored 55 against Northamptonshire, a game in which he was confined to bed with a stomach upset. In the fourth Test, Phillips scored 36 in the first innings (having a 71 run partnership with David Boon) and 37 in the second innings, helping Austrsalia draw the match, sharing an unbeaten stand of 127 with Border and not scoring until his 51st delivery. Phillips then scored 71 against Middlsex.

During the fifth Test, Phillips made 15 in the first innings; in the second he came out to bat when Australia were 5-37 - he scored 59, put on 77 with Greg Ritchie, and brought Australia to within 80 minutes of a draw before he was dismissed in controversial circumstances. Australia lost the last five wickets quickly and lost the Test. Australia lost the 6th Test to lose the Ashes 3–1.

According to one writer, Phillips, Border and Ritchie were the only Australian batsmen to perform well during the series. "Phillips made few mistakes behind the stumps for a wicketkeeper derided as "a batsman with gloves". And his thrilling square cut was reminiscent of the great Ted Dexter at the height of his power." Trevor Grant of The Age wrote Phillips "still looks the most untrustworthy wicketkeeper around but he took all the catches that mattered, particularly early in the series. His batting from the middle order remains of significant value." The Daily Telegraph said Phillips "has been a most valuable all-rounder —a free-hitting, authoritative strokemaker and an adequate, if ungainly and originally reluctant, wicketkeeper, until he dropped two catches, one easy, one hard, in England’s first innings at the Oval on Friday."

Imran Khan felt Phillips "was wasted at no. 7. Throughout the series he looked one of the best Australian batsmen, yet by the time he came in to bat the damage had been done. The reason the best batsmen bat high in the order is to prevent a crisis. Once a crisis does occur it's difficult to avert a collapse. In a crisis a batsman cannot play his natural game... Phillips is a similar player to Gower and should have come in early. Had it come off, he would have dominated taking the pressure off the rest of the batting line up. If he felt he could not bat higher up because of his keeping, a specialist keeper should have played."

According to Kepler Wessels' biographer, Wessels had an altercation with Phillips towards the end of the tour. The author called Phillips "precisely the sort of character who regularly irritated Wessels. Smart, swish, quick-witted, he represented the antithesis of the sober, hard-working attitude that Wessels so admired, and indeed epitomised."

== Final international summer ==
=== New Zealand series ===
At the beginning of the 1985-86 summer, Mike Coward wrote that "there cannot be any question about Wayne Phillips being named wicketkeeper. After all, arguably, he is the second-best batsman in the Australian team." In picking an Australian side for the first Test against New Zealand, a panel of six experts in the Sun Herald, including Ian Chappell, Bob Simpson and Bill O'Reilly, all had Phillips as Australia's keeper.

In an early Shield game against WA, Phillips dropped several catches and made a number of fumbles. He made 44 for South Australia against New Zealand. In the first Test against New Zealand Phillips scored 34 and 2, in a heavy Australian defeat. He scored 46 in a Shield game against Queensland. Kepler Wessels then withdrew himself from national selection after a dispute with the Australian Cricket Board, and Andrew Hilditch was dropped from the Test team. Bob Simpson suggested that Phillips move up the opener with Greg Dyer brought in as keeper. Simpson wrote:

The right type of wicketkeeper can lift the whole team with his energy and enthusiasm. Unfortunately Wayne Phillips does not seem to be interested in be cast in this mould. Too often he is content to not even bother go up to the stumps to take the returns or even try to take poor returns on the full in an attempt to make the fielding look a little neater and more efficient. As a result the Australian fielding tends to regularly look a little more ragged than it should.

In the second Test Phillips was shifted up the order as opener (partnered with Robbie Kerr) but continued to be Australia's keeper. He scored 31 in the first innings and 63 in the second, laying the platform for a successful chase.

In the third Test against New Zealand, Phillips (again opening) scored 37 and 10 (over 78 minutes). He missed a chance to catch Martin Crowe on 29 in the first innings (Crowe went on to score 71) and a stumping off Greg Matthews in the second innings when John Wright was 20. Australia lost the match, and thus the series 2–1. Trevor Grant of The Age wrote Phillips "has survived rather than prospered since taking over from Rod Marsh" and felt the last day of the third Test "revealed the inadequacies which have been apparent for so long... As the pressure built throughout the day, Phillips' work became more untidy and a question mark has to be placed against his position behind the stumps."

Phillips admitted he was "disappointed with my keeping in the second innings" of the third Test "but I defy anyone to do much better than I did on that wicket." Phillips said Rod Marsh told him that his issue was his footwork rather than his catching. "I have to work a lot harder than those who came before me; they were all so natural at it. Really I think we were spoiled for a long time by Rod Marsh." He added, the "criticism has been pretty constant. I don't really cope with it at all."

=== India series ===
Australia then played a three Test series against India. This ended up being a 0–0 draw although Australia was lucky not to lose the last two Test matches and never dismissed India for less than 445. Phillips was wicketkeeper in every game.

Phillips opened in the first Test, scoring 11. When India batted he dropped Sunil Gavaskar on 38 and the batter went on to make 166 not out in a drawn game. Bill O'Reilly wrote. "It is nothing less than wanton neglect of duty for the selectors to continue at this frightening stage with Wayne Phillips, who looks as comfortable bending down behind the stumps as the proverbial bull in the china shop. He must be relieved of the job so some peace can be fostered in the minds of spin bowlers."

Phillips scored 66 for South Australia against NSW in a McDonalds Cup game and 33 in a Shield game. In the second Test he opened in the first innings scoring 7, then was put down the order for the second innings, making 13; this led to David Boon opening with Geoff Marsh for the first time. Phillips missed a chance off Srikkanth in the first innings when the batter was 61 (he scored 86). In the second innings he missed two easy stumpings off the bowling of Ray Bright, Gavaskar on 8 and Kris Srikkanth on 35, causing Allan Border to come to Phillips' defence: "I feel sorry for Wayne", he said. "He's had a couple of bad tracks to keep on. He feels he is letting down the side. But I hope we stick with him. I don't believe there is a 'keeper in the country capable of doing any better." However Trevor Grant of The Age declared, "let us accept that asking him to keep wickets was a mistake that did not work." Australia were fortunate to escape with a draw for the match.

Phillips kept his spot for the third Test. Border said Phillips "isn't enjoying things and blames himself for letting the boys down. But practically everyone in the side has gone to him and expressed their confidence." Mike Coward reported that that keeper had been vomiting during recent matches.

Phillips made 14 and 22. The Australian team dropped numerous catches throughout the match and Phillips missed a stumping off Ray Bright's bowling to Dilip Vengsarkar. This game saw Boon and Marsh put on 217 for first wicket, leading to them becoming a regular opening combination over the next few years. Australia managed to draw the Test, leading to a 0–0 result.

=== World Series Cup ===
Phillips was selected as Australia's wicketkeeper in the one-day team for the World Series Cup tournament. His keeping improved for the first game against New Zealand, and Phillips was promoted to opener for a match against India, making 8 and fumbling a run out of Sharma who was on four. However, in another game against New Zealand Phillips took three catches and made a stumping. Then in another New Zealand game, Phillips' innings of 28 off 13 balls was crucial to an Australian victory.

During the Prime Minister's XI match against New Zealand, Prime Minister Bob Hawke weighed in on the issue of Australia's wicketkeeper:

We've got to have a specialist wicketkeeper and I don't mean that as any reflection on Wayne Phillips. I think an unfair burden has been placed on him. What we need to see is Australia's best keeper chosen and I think we'll see Phillips in there as a batsman and we'll get much more value from his batting when he's been relieved of that burden.

Phillips later scored 23 off 8 balls in a game against India.

During the World Series Cup tournament, the Australian squad for the 1986 tour to New Zealand was announced; Phillips retained his place as a batter but specialist wicketkeeper Tim Zoehrer would be the 'keeper. Cricket journalist Mike Coward wrote at the time that "Phillips, who has been the butt of much criticism and ridicule over the past 12 months... who has been severely depressed at times this season, will privately rejoice at Zoehrer's promotion". Phillips said, "The selectors have ben pretty good to me. I probably didn't warrant selection as a wicketkeeper. But I can be thankful I have another string to my bow."

Phillips injured his finger in a one-day game against New Zealand. He was still named as keeper for the WSC finals but his finger did not repair in time and he was replaced in the ODI team by Zoehrer - Australia won the finals 2–0. However Phillps recovered from his injury to make the New Zealand tour.

=== New Zealand tour ===
Phillips began the New Zealand tour poorly, scoring 0 in a match against Auckland, batting at three as a specialist, after Boon and Marsh. He opened against Northern Districts, making 44 and 12. Phillips was selected in Australia's side for the first Test, playing at number three as a specialist batter: he scored 1 and 25.

"I haven't made up my mind absolutely on Phillips," said Border, "but he is more relaxed and enjoying his cricket more than before."

In a tour game against Central Districts, Phillips made 12 in the first innings and 48 in the second. He kept his spot for the second Test, making 1 and 25.

Phillips expected to be dropped for the third and final Test but kept his position. He scored 62 in the first innings, taking part in a 168 run partnership with Geoff Marsh. Mike Coward wrote that Phillips "is not finding the game any easier or self satisfying" since he stopped keeping and "vomited several times" during his innings. "He thinks it could have been the heat but he does not discount the possibility of nerves getting the better of him... these days, Phillips, a noted comic, finds it increasingly difficult to laugh." He only made 15 in Australia's second innings. Phillips took over wicketkeeping in New Zealand's second innings when Zoehrer was injured and missed stumping opportunities off Ken Rutherford and John Wright as New Zealand chased down 160 to win the game (and the series 1–0). This turned out to be Phillip's last Test.

Phillips played as Australia's wicketkeeper during the four-match ODI series that followed the Tests. He scored 23 in the first, which Australia lost, prompting Allan Border to threaten to resign from the captaincy. In the second ODI, Phillips made 12. He played one last great innings for Australia in the 3rd ODI. Phillips came to the wicket with Australia at 5–142 requiring 230 to win and Steve Waugh batting at the other end. Waugh asked him what he thought and Phillips replied, "Simple, young fella. With my talent and your youth, we'll get these with an over to spare." The two of them put on 86 runs with Phillips scoring 53 off 32 balls, and Australia won by 3 wickets. Phillips and Waugh were voted joint man of the match. Journalist Trevor Grant, who covered the game, wrote that

Anyone who has followed the career of the South Australian left-hander and former wicketkeeper knows his capacity to turn a game. But his form has reached such a low point on this tour that it was illogical to believe he could do it at this stage of a long, demanding and utterly forgettable season. But all the exasperating uncertainty was suddenly cast aside today.

In the 4th and final ODI Phillips scored 10 off 11 balls. This was his last ODI for Australia.

=== Sharjah and India omission ===
Phillips was picked in the Australian squad for the 1986 tour of Sharjah. However he did not want to wicketkeep ("Zoehrer was there and fit so I could not see the need") and was overlooked for selection in all the games Australia played.

Phillips was not selected in the squad to tour India later that year, the only member of the New Zealand squad to be so ignored. When asked about his omission, Phillips replied that he was "going to do what he wanted to do and not going to be at the beck and call of these idiots who pick the side. He stated "I don't think my form in the later stages of the New Zealand tour was that bad. It may well have been political.Perhaps I'm trying to convince myself of the case." Phillips suggested he might have been dropped due to refusing to wicketkeep in Sharjah and/or signing for South Africa. "I was quite prepared for it [being dropped] but I thought there were some other guys from New Zealand who would get the chop. I don't feel hard done by but there were others in the same boat. I've had a terrific run. It certainly isn't the end of the world."

Phillips expressed regret for his comments the next day but was fined $2,000 by the Australian Cricket Board. Barry Gibbs of the ACB said "I cannot recall an instance where a player has been so critical of selectors in public, particularly one who is under contract to the board." Phillips never played for Australia again, in Tests or ODIs.

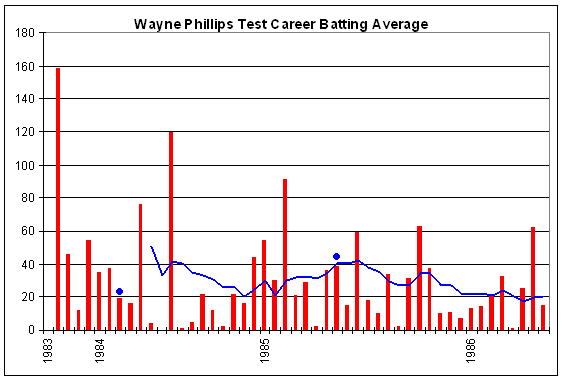
Wayne Phillips' Test career batting performance

== Post Test career ==
Philips went on to score runs for South Australia until the early 1990s. He concentrated on batting although he occasionally returned to wicketkeeping.

In October 1986 Allan Border hinted that Phillips might be able to force his way back into the ODI side that summer saying "I think Wayne's batting is dangerous at the best of times."

Phillips scored 116 and 70 for South Australia against the touring English side but told the press, "I'm a long way off getting back in the test team." Phillips also made 81 against Queensland, and 148 against New South Wales.

In March 1987, he batted in partnership of 462 runs with David Hookes against Tasmania, setting an Australian record for the highest first run partnership. Phillips scored 213 not out. The runs were scored in 299 minutes off only 84.3 overs He then scored 75 off 43 balls in South Australia's victory of Tasmania in the McDonald's Cup. Despite this, he was not recalled to the national side, in Tests or ODIs.

In June 1987 Phillips told South Australian selectors he was willing to wicketkeep again. Phillips scored 75 against the touring New Zealanders and 126 against Victoria. South Australia made the McDonalds Cup final again (losing to NSW). Phillips made 669 runs at 37.16.

In 1988–89, returning to specialist batting again, Phillips scored 129 runs at 18 for South Australia and was dropped to make way for Darren Lehmann. In 1989–90 he captained Sturt to the Adelaide District Championship.

In 1990–91 Phillips was recalled to the South Australian side after two seasons. He played for South Australia in one dayers as a wicketkeeper.

== Assessment ==
Phillip's promotion to wicketkeeper is generally held to have done considerable damage to his talents as a batsman. Steve Waugh later described him as:

That sporadic genuius... 'Flipper' was always upbeat and great fun to be around – except when he was driving the team bus, in a style that on occasions bordered on maniacal and broke most of the known road rules – but I could never quite work out whether his casual, laid-back attitude was genuine or a disguise for uncertainty and self-doubt.

At his peak, his good looks and ability to score fast meant he was one of the most popular Australian players, particularly with Channel Nine (who broadcast the game) and PBL (in change of marketing). Graham Halbish, an executive with the Australian Cricket Board, later wrote that:

Wayne was very popular with Channel Nine and PBL because they believed he was good value as a commercial asset. PBL rated him in the top three or so players in the country. The selectors certainly did not have him rated that highly. He was a wicketkeeper and a batsman but he was not performing to an exceptional standard, or consistently. Statistics did not equate to his profile.

As of 2003, Phillips held the Test match records for the most matches played (18) and catches taken (43) in a complete career without a stumping. However he did take 7 stumpings in ODIs.

== Coaching ==
He coached the Southern Redbacks for four seasons, until resigning on 16 March 2007, one season before his contract was set to expire. Darren Lehmann wrote Phillips "impressed me as a coach because in addition to his technical excellence and the fact he could command instant respect... he was calm and retained a sense of humour. In fact, Flipper was one of the funniest coaches I ever met and he taught me the value of laughter in the team environment."

== Post Cricket career ==
In 2007 Phillips accepted a position as chief fundraiser for the South Australian branch of the Liberal Party.

== Family ==
Philiips' father Brian Phillips was an Australian rules footballer and chairman of selectors with Sturt Football Club in the South Australian National Football League.
