= Sri Maha Vishnumoorthy Temple, Karval, Yerlapady =

Sri Maha Vishnumoorthy

Religion
- Affiliation: Hinduism

Location
- Location: Karval
- State: Karnataka
- Country: India

Sri Maha Vishnumoorthy Temple is located in the village of Karval in the karkal(tq) of Udupi district, Karnataka, India. Karval is located in between Udupi and Kakala at a distance of 28 km from Udupi and 15 km from Karkala. Thousands of devotees visit the temple to seek blessing from Lord Maha Vishnu and Naga.

Former Indian Cricketer Ravi Shastri worships at the temple annually.
