= Laxman Sivaramakrishnan =

Indian cricketer (born 1965)

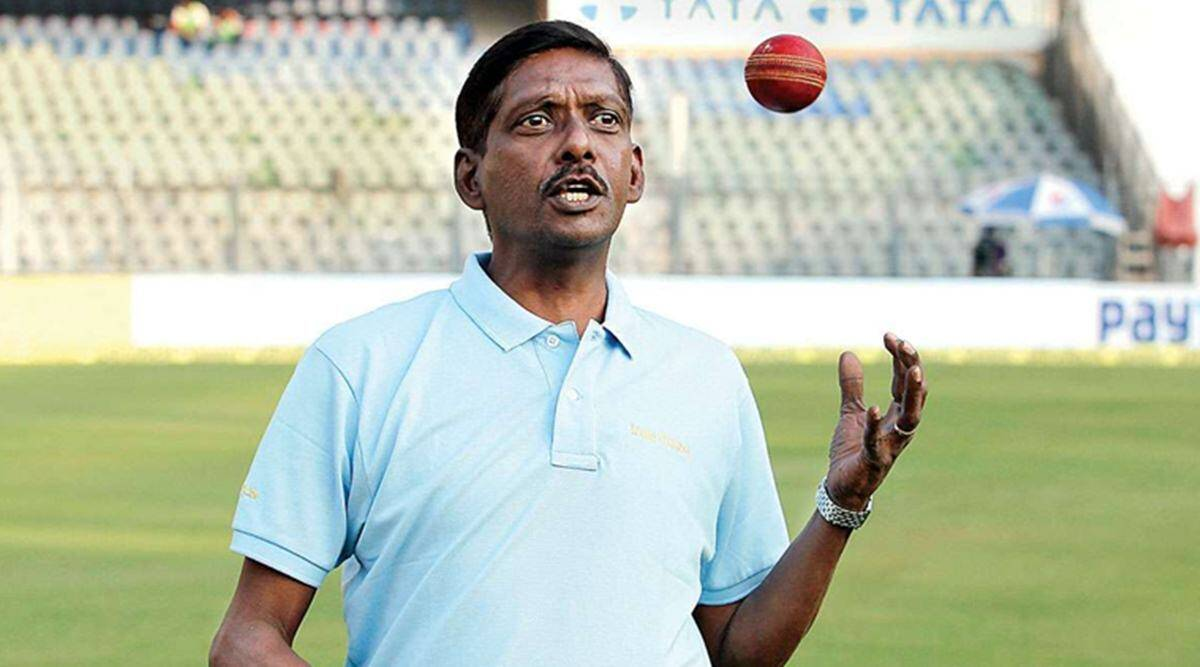

Personal information
- Born: 31 December 1965 (age 60); Madras, Madras State, India
- Batting: Right-handed
- Bowling: Right-arm leg break
- Role: Bowler

International information
- National side: India (1983–1987)
- Test debut (cap 164): 28 April 1983 v West Indies
- Last Test: 2 January 1986 v Australia
- ODI debut (cap 54): 20 February 1985 v Pakistan
- Last ODI: 17 October 1987 v Zimbabwe

Career statistics
Competition	Test	ODI	FC
Matches	9	16	76
Runs scored	130	5	1,802
Batting average	16.25	2.50	25.02
100s/50s	0/0	0/0	5/3
Top score	25	2*	130
Balls bowled	2,367	756	10,436
Wickets	26	15	154
Bowling average	44.03	35.86	38.49
5 wickets in innings	3	0	6
10 wickets in match	1	0	1
Best bowling	6/64	3/35	7/28
Catches/stumpings	9/–	7/–	60
- Source: ESPNcricinfo, 10 October 2019

Laxman Sivaramakrishnan (born 31 December 1965), popularly known as Siva and LS, is a former Indian cricketer and commentator. During his playing career, he was a right-arm leg-spinner. Sivaramakrishnan began his commentary career in a test match between India and Bangladesh in 2000. He also serves as one of the players' representatives on the International Cricket Council's cricket committee. He was also a part of the Indian squad which won the 1985 World Championship of Cricket.

== Early days ==
Sivaramakrishnan first drew attention as a 12-year-old, claiming 7 wickets for 2 runs (7/2) in a Madras inter-school championship game. At fifteen, he was the youngest member of the Under-19 India squad that toured Sri Lanka under Ravi Shastri in 1980. He began his first class career at the age of 16 in 1981 and made an immediate impression. On his debut against the Delhi cricket team in the quarter-final of the 1981/82 Ranji Trophy, he took 7 for 28 in the second innings, all the wickets coming in a spell of eleven overs. On account of this performance, he was selected in the South Zone side to play the West Zone in the Duleep Trophy. After going wicketless in the first innings, he took five in the second, including the wicket of Sunil Gavaskar who padded up to a googly.

Sivaramakrishnan was immediately noticed and picked for the team to tour Pakistan in 1982/83 and later to the West Indies. He had played only three first-class matches until then. Sivaramakrishnan made his Test debut at St. John's at the age of 17 years and 118 days, the youngest Indian Test cricketer until that point in time. He went wicketless but scored 17 runs in the only inning that he played. In 1984, he toured Zimbabwe with the Young India side under Ravi Shastri. Later that year, he was back in the Indian side, taking 4 for 27 against the visiting England cricket team for the India Under-25. He was the third-youngest player to take ten wickets in a match at the age of 18 years and 333 days against England.

== Rise to the top ==
Sivaramakrishnan's second Test appearance was in the first Test against England in Bombay. His first wicket was Graeme Fowler who was caught and bowled. His 6 for 64 and 6 for 117 helped India to an eight-wicket win. It was India's first win in a Test match since 1981. Sivaramakrishnan took another six wickets in the next innings in Delhi. He took only five more wickets in the remainder of the series.

In the World Championship of Cricket in Australia later that season, he finished as the top wicket-taker and also took the most catches in the tournament. It was a time when spinners, especially leg-spinners, were considered a luxury in one day cricket. A memorable dismissal was that of Javed Miandad who was stumped off a leg break in the final. Sivaramakrishnan did similarly well in the four-nation tournament in Sharjah a few weeks later. India won eight consecutive matches, along with Siva's ODI debut. Overall, India won 12 out of the 16 matches Siva represented in his Career.

== Decline and later career ==
His next season saw a sudden drop in form. He played a test in Sri Lanka in 1985 and two in Australia with little success. That was the end of his Test career.

He made an unexpected comeback to the 1987 World Cup team and played in two matches. The only wicket that he took was that of Zimbabwean John Traicos, caught at midwicket by Gavaskar.

Sivaramakrishnan converted himself into a batsman and continued to play first-class cricket on and off for another ten years. He contributed three centuries when Tamil Nadu won the Ranji Trophy in 1987/88. There were frequent reports of a comeback for the national team, but they all proved to be rumours. In his last season, he played for Baroda.

== Post-playing career ==
In 1999, a wrong treatment to a finger fracture led Sivaramakrishnan to try his hand at commentary. He made his debut in 2000 during Bangladesh's inaugural Test in Dhaka. He announced his retirement from the BCCI commentary panel in March 2026 citing dissatisfaction with the job and a lack of opportunities, even after 23 years. A few days later, in an interview with the Indian Express, he spoke about experiencing colour-based discrimination throughout his playing career, instances of psychological distress and low self-esteem during his playing and commentary days.

== Name ==
With Hugh Bromley-Davenport and B. K. Venkatesh Prasad, he shares the record for the longest 'supposed' surname among Test cricketers. However, Sivaramakrishan is not his surname at all. He started out as L. Sivaramakrishnan, but, as is typical with expanding initialed South Indian names, turning the L to Laxmanan caused Sivaramakrishnan to appear to be his surname. Sivaramakrishnan is his given name, and his father's given name was Laxmanan; hence, he started out as L. Sivaramakrishnan, as is common with Tamils to keep the first letter of one's father's first name as initial.

== ICC ==
In May 2013, Sivaramakrishnan was named as a players' representative on the International Cricket Council's cricket committee. In the ICC Champions Trophy 2017, he voiced his first commentary in Tamil language which was broadcast by Star Sports Tamil.
