= Sadanand Viswanath =

Indian cricketer (born 1962)

Personal information
- Born: 29 November 1962 (age 63); Bangalore, Karnataka, India
- Batting: Right-handed
- Role: Wicket-keeper

International information
- National side: India (1985-1988)
- Test debut (cap 172): 30 August 1985 v Sri Lanka
- Last Test: 14 September 1985 v Sri Lanka
- ODI debut (cap 52): 20 January 1985 v England
- Last ODI: 7 January 1988 v West Indies

Umpiring information
- WODIs umpired: 1 (1997)

Career statistics
Competition	Tests	ODIs
Matches	3	22
Runs scored	31	72
Batting average	6.20	9.00
100s/50s	-/-	-/-
Top score	20	23*
Balls bowled	-	-
Wickets	-	-
Bowling average	-	-
5 wickets in innings	-	-
10 wickets in match	-	n/a
Best bowling	-	-
Catches/stumpings	11/-	17/7
- Source: ESPNcricinfo, 10 May 2020

Sadanand Viswanath (Kannada: ಸದಾನಂದ ವಿಶ್ವನಾಥ್‌) (born 28 November 1962, Bangalore, Karnataka) is a former Indian cricketer who played in 3 Tests and 22 ODIs, from 1985 to 1988. Currently, he is a first class umpire and coach. He was a part of the Indian squad which won the 1985 World Championship of Cricket.

== Career ==
Vishy gained recognition during the height of India's ascendancy in world cricket in the mid '80s. Sadanand was first selected in the Indian team which won the World Championship of Cricket tournament in Australia and the Rothmans Cup in Sharjah days later, in 1985. The thumping triumphs, where India did not lose a single match, validated its claim as the world's best ODI team. People had started to believe in the qualities of a team they earlier thought had won the 1983 World Cup by fluke.

== Playing style ==
An aggressive wicketkeeper-batsman, Vishwanath is remembered for a hard six he hit out of Bangalore's Chinnaswamy stadium against Allan Border's Australians. Border commented later, "The ball probably had ice on it when it came down!"

== International career ==
Viswanath's stint in international cricket was brief but the fiery wicketkeeper was noticed by all.Sunil Gavaskar commented in his book 'One-Day Wonders', "People will talk about many other reasons why we won the World Championship of Cricket in 1985 but one of the main reasons was the presence of Sadanand Vishwanath behind the stumps." The Australian media too had written that " this good-looking wicket-keeper may be on his way to becoming India’s best ever."

== Death of Parents ==
The death of his parents within a short span of time had a demoralising effect. Viswanath was not able to fulfil the expectations placed upon him, and was replaced as wicket-keeper by Kiran More and Chandrakant Pandit.

== Coaching Academy ==
Sadanand now runs his private cricket coaching academy for young boys in Kundalahalli, Bangalore and also follows the game closely as an umpire in India's domestic championship for the Ranji Trophy. Recently, Sadanand was promoted to the Elite Panel of Indian umpires which makes him eligible to umpire the upper tier, that is, the zonal matches played for the Duleep and Deodhar Trophies.
