= Robbie Kerr (Australian cricketer) =

Australian cricketer

Personal information
- Full name: Robert Byers Kerr
- Born: 16 June 1961 (age 65); Brisbane, Australia
- Batting: Right-handed
- Bowling: Legbreak googly
- Role: Batsman

International information
- National side: Australia
- Test debut (cap 331): 22 November 1985 v New Zealand
- Last Test: 30 November 1985 v New Zealand
- ODI debut (cap 86): 12 February 1985 v West Indies
- Last ODI: 3 March 1985 v India

Domestic team information
- Years: Team
- 1981/82–1989/90: Queensland

Career statistics
Competition	Test	ODI	FC	LA
Matches	2	4	93	36
Runs scored	31	97	5709	968
Batting average	7.75	32.33	37.31	30.25
100s/50s	0/0	0/1	16/28	0/10
Top score	17	87*	201*	95*
Balls bowled	–	–	36	–
Wickets	–	–	1	–
Bowling average	–	–	16.00	–
5 wickets in innings	–	–	0	–
10 wickets in match	–	–	0	–
Best bowling	–	–	1/12	–
Catches/stumpings	1/–	1/–	90/–	12/–
- Source: CricketArchive, 8 January 2012

Robert Byers Kerr (born 16 June 1961) is an Australian former cricketer who played in two Test matches and four One Day Internationals in 1985. He represented Queensland in four Sheffield Shield finals.

== Career ==
=== Early career ===
Kerr played for Queensland Colts in 1980–81, scoring 82 not out against Tasmania.

Kerr made his first-class debut in November 1981 against Western Australia, scoring 4. In his third first-class game, against South Australia, he scored 103. He made 66 against South Australia, and 158 and 101 in a game against Western Australia.

Kerr scored 613 first-class runs over the 1981-82 summer at an average of 41.15, forming a notable opening combination with Kepler Wessels.

Kerr also impressed in one-day cricket, scoring 50 off 68 balls against Western Australia in a man-of-the-match performance. He played in the McDonald's Cup final, only scoring 1 in a game which Queensland won.

Kerr started the following summer with 65 against the touring English, and 112 against Tasmania. He then had a form slump, but soon after made 102 against the touring New Zealanders, taking part in a partnership of 232 with Wessels. He also scored 72 against New South Wales and 132 against Victoria, partnering with Wessels in a 388-run stand).

Across the season, he scored 876 first-class runs at 39.81.

Kerr was picked on a tour to Zimbabwe with a Young Australia side captained by Dirk Wellham and also including David Boon and Wayne Phillips. He played two first-class games on tour, scoring only 37 runs at an average of 12.33, although he did score 58 in a one-day game.

Kerr's highlights for the following summer included 51 against Pakistan, 75 against Tasmania, 103 against Western Australia, and 136 against South Australia. He also made 166 against Victoria. These scores saw him being discussed as a possibility for the upcoming West Indies tour.

Kerr was ultimately overlooked for this touring squad, but his omission allowed him to play in the Sheffield Shield final, where he scored 56 and 4, in a game Queensland lost.

Overall, Kerr scored 866 first-class runs at 39.39 that summer.

=== 1984-85: ODI Cricketer ===
Kerr made 50 and 92 in McDonald's Cup games, and 106 against Victoria in a Shield match. He also scored 87 for Queensland in a one-day game against Sri Lanka.

Australia were struggling against the West Indies and some pundits thought that Kerr might be selected over Wessels for the Second Test. However, this did not happen and the retained Wessels rediscovered his form. Nonetheless, when Graeme Wood had injury concerns before the Fourth Test, Kerr was placed on standby for him, although Wood ended up playing in the match.

Kerr's form was not outstanding over the middle part of the summer, but he did make 60 and 201 against Tasmania. He later made 9 and 0 in the Sheffield Shield final, which Queensland lost to New South Wales.

In total, Kerr made 623 first-class runs in 1984–85 at 44.50.

After Kerr scored 201 against Tasmania, he was added to the Australian one-day squad for the second World Series Cup final, against the West Indies.

Kerr was 12th man in this game, but made his debut in the third, selected over Kim Hughes. Batting at number three, Kerr scored 4 in an Australian defeat.

Kerr kept his spot in the Australian one-day side for a short series that followed: a World Championship of Cricket. Playing against England, Kerr opened the batting with Kepler Wessels and scored 87 not out off 126 balls as Australia successfully chased down England's total, with Kerr winning the man-of-the-match award.

However, against Pakistan he made only 2 and against India he made just 4.

Kerr was then selected for the Australian tour of the United Arab Emirates, where the team played a one-day tournament. However, he did not play any internationals on tour and never played one-day cricket for Australia again.

Kerr also missed selection for the 1985 Ashes. However, he was appointed captain of an Australian Under-25 side that toured Zimbabwe in October 1985. On this tour, he made 103 first-class runs at 25.75, including a top score of 68.

=== 1985-86: Test Cricketer ===
Kerr started the following season slowly until he made 80 against South Australia.

Kerr was then selected in the Australian side for the Second Test against the touring New Zealanders, replacing Andrew Hilditch who had been dropped, whilst Kepler Wessels had retired from the Australian team. He scored 7 in both innings (off seven balls in the first, and 55 balls in the second), with Australia winning the game by four wickets due to its superior spin bowling.

Kerr kept his spot for the Third Test. However, he scored just 17 and 0 (batting with a dislocated finger) in a game which Australia lost.

He kept his spot in the squad for the next Test, against India. However, he was made 12th man with his place in the team being filled by Geoff Marsh. Boon and Marsh opened the batting together and were considered a success, becoming Australia's opening pair for the next several seasons.

In the Sheffield Shield, Kerr scored 84 and 50 against New South Wales, 102 in a later match against New South Wales and played in his third Shield final, scoring 64 and 34. In ultimately drawing the game, Queensland again failed to win the Shield.

Kerr scored 609 first-class runs that summer at 32.05.

=== Later career ===
Over the following season, Kerr scored 676 first-class runs at 39.76. Highlights included 92 in a McDonald's Cup game against South Australia, 95 against the touring English side, 88 against Tasmania, 76 against South Australia in a Shield game, 82 against NSW, and 140 against Tasmania.

In December 1986, Kerr was convicted of drink driving. Nonetheless, he was made acting captain of Queensland in Allan Border's absence on international duties.

In 1987–88, Kerr made 793 runs at 39.65, including 91 against South Australia, 107 against New South Wales, 102 against Western Australia, and 62 and 96 against Tasmania. At the end of the season, he played in another Sheffield Shield final, scoring 47 and 2 against Western Australia.

In August 1988, Kerr suffered whiplash in a car accident. He subsequently had a poor season, making 153 runs at 25.5, with a top score of 69.

In his last season of first-class cricket in 1989–90, Kerr made 360 runs at 27.69, with the bulk of these runs coming in two innings with scores of 86 and 123.
