= Dilip Vengsarkar =

Former Indian cricketer and cricket administrator

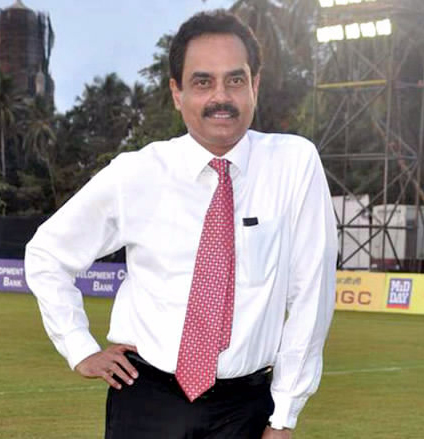
- Vengsarkar in 2011

Personal information
- Full name: Dilip Balwant Vengsarkar
- Born: 6 April 1956 (age 70); Rajapur, Maharashtra, India
- Batting: Right-handed
- Bowling: Right-arm medium

International information
- National side: India (1976–1992)
- Test debut (cap 139): 24 January 1976 v New Zealand
- Last Test: 5 February 1992 v Australia
- ODI debut (cap 19): 21 February 1976 v New Zealand
- Last ODI: 14 November 1991 v South Africa

Domestic team information
- Years: Team
- 1975/76–1991/92: Mumbai
- 1985: Staffordshire

Career statistics
Competition	Test	ODI	FC	LA
Matches	116	129	260	174
Runs scored	6,868	3,508	17,868	4,835
Batting average	42.13	34.73	52.86	35.29
100s/50s	17/35	1/23	55/87	1/35
Top score	166	105	284	105
Balls bowled	47	6	199	12
Wickets	0	0	1	0
Bowling average	–	–	126.00	–
5 wickets in innings	–	–	0	–
10 wickets in match	–	–	0	–
Best bowling	–	–	1/31	–
Catches/stumpings	78/–	37/–	179/–	51/–
Medal record
Men's Cricket
Representing India
ICC Cricket World Cup
Winner	1983 England and Wales
ACC Asia Cup
Winner	1984 United Arab Emirates
Winner	1988 Bangladesh
- Source: ESPNcricinfo, 7 February 2010

Dilip Balwant Vengsarkar (born 6 April 1956) is a former Indian cricketer and a cricket administrator. He was considered to have a very good drive. Along with Sunil Gavaskar and Gundappa Viswanath, he was a key player in the Indian batting line up in the late 70s and early 80s. He was a member of the Indian team that won the 1983 Cricket World Cup. Vengsarkar also led the national side to 1988 Asia Cup victory. He was also a part of the Indian squad which won the 1985 World Championship of Cricket. He went on to play until 1992.

At the pinnacle of his career, Vengsarkar was rated as the best batsman in the Coopers and Lybrand rating (a predecessor of the PWC ratings) and he held the number one slot for 21 months until 2 March 1989. In 2014, he received the C. K. Nayudu Lifetime Achievement Award, the highest honour conferred by BCCI on a former player.

== Career ==
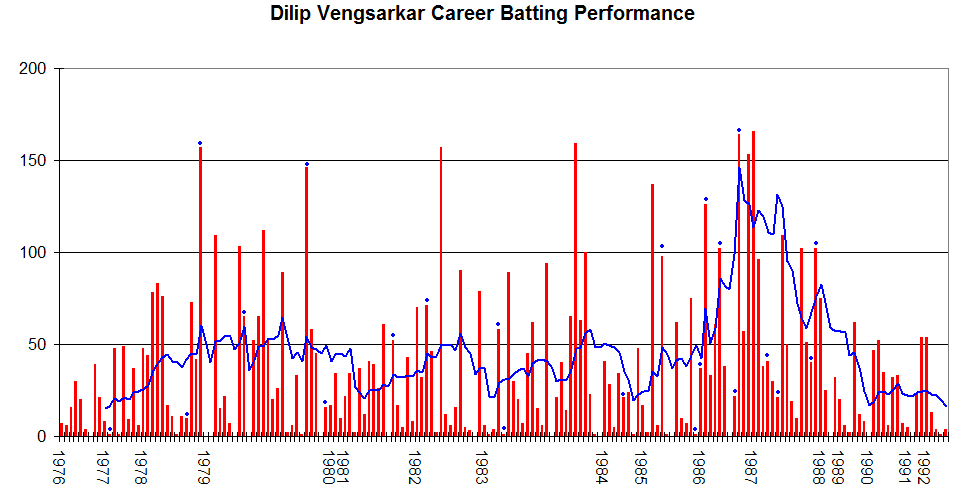
Vengsarkar's career batting performance

Vengsarkar made his international cricket debut against New Zealand at Auckland in 1975–76 as an opening batsman. India won this Test convincingly, but he did not have much success. Later on he usually batted in the No.3 or No.4 position.

He played a memorable inning in 1979 against Asif Iqbal's Pakistan team in the 2nd Test at Feroz Shah Kotla, Delhi. Requiring 390 to win on the final day, he led India's chase getting the team very close to a victory. India ended up with 364 for 6, just 26 runs short of what would have been a remarkable win. With Yashpal Sharma, Kapil Dev and Roger Binny back to the pavilion after the Tea break, Vengsarkar saw himself running out of partners and decided to play the last few overs for a draw. He remained unbeaten on 146.

During the 1978–79 Test Series in India against the West Indies, he was involved in a partnership of over 300 runs with Sunil Gavaskar at Calcutta, with both batsman scoring centuries.

He was a member of the 1983 World Champion's team, though, on 15 June in a match against the West Indies, he was forced to miss the latter part of the tournament after being struck on the face by a bouncer from Malcolm Marshall, and resulted in seven stitches. Post 1983, he had a productive run of scores between 1985 and 1987, where he scored centuries against Pakistan, Australia, England, West Indies and Sri Lanka, many of them in successive games.

While the West Indies pacemen dominated the cricket world, Dilip Vengsarkar was one of the few batsmen who was successful against them, and scored 6 centuries against the likes of Malcolm Marshall, Michael Holding and Andy Roberts.

He is currently team mentor and coach for Telugu Warrior team in the Celebrity Cricket League Season 5.

He also scored a century at Lord's in 1986, thus scoring consecutive Test match centuries at Lord's in three matches.

== Captaincy ==
Vengsarkar took over the captaincy from Kapil Dev after the 1987 Cricket World Cup, despite criticism that he missed the semi-final match due to a stomach disorder resulting from a seafood allergy. Although he started with two centuries in his first series as captain, his captaincy period was turbulent and he lost the job following a disastrous tour of the West Indies in early 1989 and a stand-off with the Board of Control for Cricket in India.

== Awards ==
- Vengsarkar was awarded the Arjuna Award for his on-field performances in 1981
- For his contribution to the Indian cricket the Government of India decorated him with the Padma Shri honour in 1987.
- Wisden Cricketers of the Year in 1987
- Vengsarkar was awarded the C. K. Nayudu Lifetime Achievement award by the Board of Control for Cricket in India (BCCI).

== Administrator ==
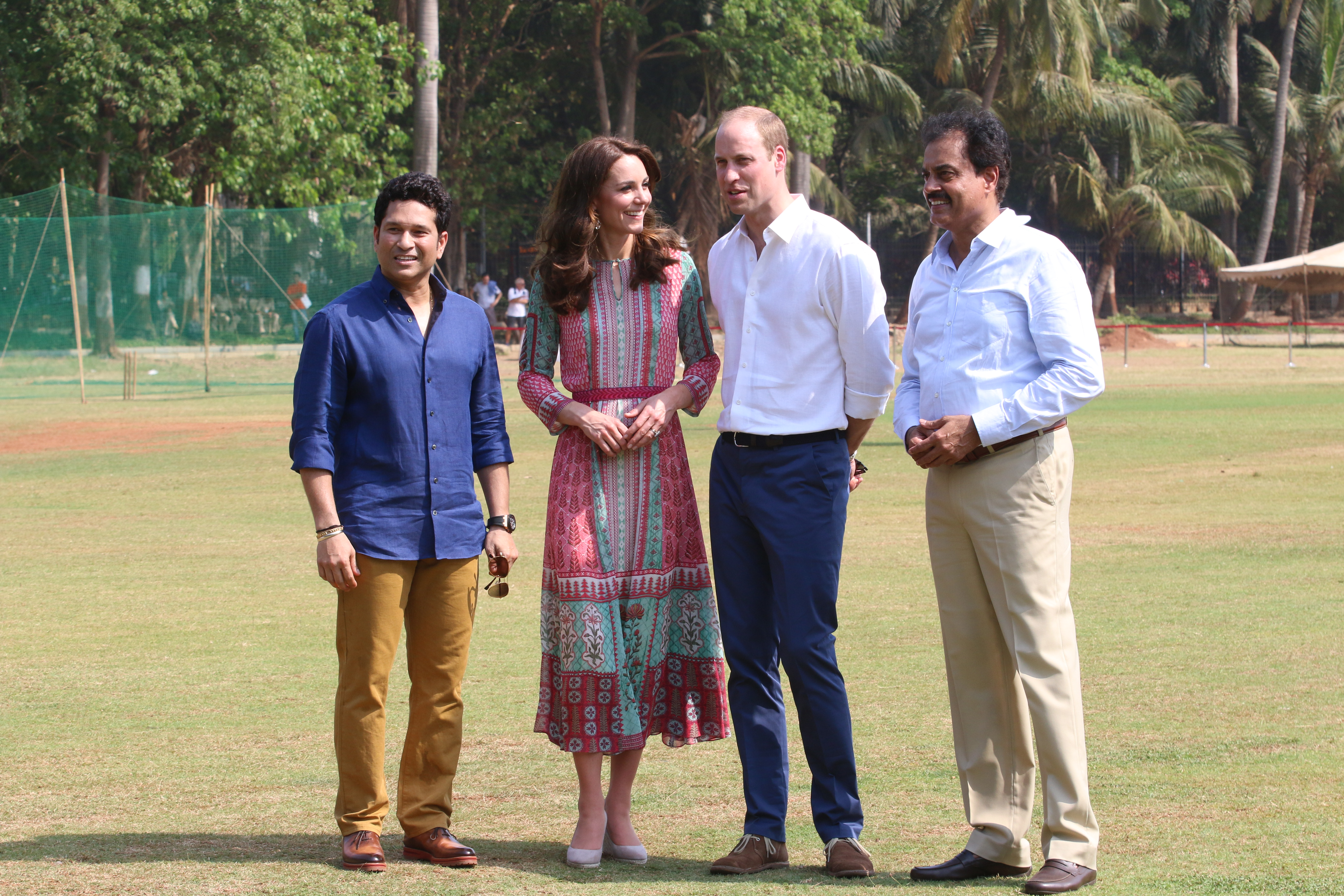
Vengsarkar with Prince William, Duke of Cambridge, Catherine, Duchess of Cambridge and Sachin Tendulkar at the Oval Maidan in Mumbai

After retiring, Vengsarkar started the Elf-Vengsarkar Academy in 1995. He became the vice-president of the Mumbai Cricket Association in 2003. Although, he was the front runner for the post of the Chairman, Selection Committee, Dilip opted out because of his policy against zonal representation. He was appointed the Chairman of the Talent Resource Development Wing when it was created in 2002 to develop cricket talent within the country. Presently he is Chief Adviser of the Cricket Association of Telangana (CAT).

In March 2006, the BCCI proposed Vengsarkar as a match referee, but the proposal did not move forward as Vengsarkar accepted the job as chairman of selectors of the BCCI later in the year.

He runs three cricket academies, two in Mumbai and one in Pune. These academies give training free of charge to players selected on their skill level.

== In popular culture ==
A Bollywood film 83 released in 2021 about the events around India's first World Cup win, at Lords in 1983, features Adinath Kothare as Vengsarkar.

Preceded by Kapil Dev	Indian National Test Cricket Captain; 1987/88	Succeeded by Ravi Shastri
Preceded by Ravi Shastri	Indian National Test Cricket Captain; 1987/88–1989/90	Succeeded by Krishnamachari Srikkanth

Preceded by Kiran More	Chairman, Selection Committee; October 2006 – September 2008	Succeeded by Krishnamachari Srikkanth
