= Krishnamachari Srikkanth =

Former Indian cricketer (born 1959)

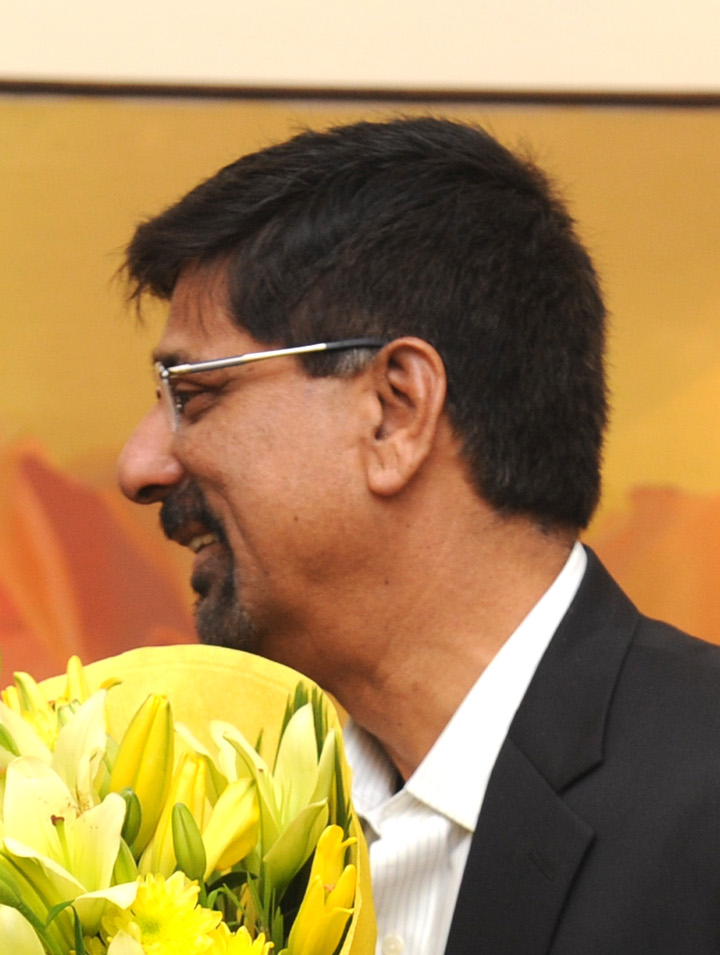
- Srikkanth in 2014

Personal information
- Full name: Krishnamachari Srikkanth
- Born: 21 December 1959 (age 66); Madras, Madras State, (present–day Chennai, Tamil Nadu) India
- Nickname: Cheeka
- Height: 175 cm (5 ft 9 in)
- Batting: Right-handed
- Bowling: Right arm offbreak
- Role: Batter
- Relatives: Adithya (son); Anirudha (son); Samyuktha Shanmuganathan (daughter-in-law)

International information
- National side: India (1981–1992)
- Test debut (cap 154): 27 November 1981 v England
- Last Test: 1 February 1992 v Australia
- ODI debut (cap 37): 25 November 1981 v England
- Last ODI: 15 March 1992 v South Africa

Career statistics
| Competition | Test | ODI | FC | LA |
|---|---|---|---|---|
| Matches | 43 | 146 | 134 | 184 |
| Runs scored | 2,062 | 4,091 | 7,349 | 5,209 |
| Batting average | 29.88 | 29.01 | 34.99 | 29.26 |
| 100s/50s | 2/12 | 4/27 | 12/45 | 5/32 |
| Top score | 123 | 123 | 172 | 123 |
| Balls bowled | 216 | 712 | 2,533 | 961 |
| Wickets | 0 | 25 | 29 | 31 |
| Bowling average | – | 25.64 | 49.72 | 29.06 |
| 5 wickets in innings | – | 2 | 0 | 2 |
| 10 wickets in match | – | 0 | 0 | 0 |
| Best bowling | – | 5/27 | 3/14 | 5/27 |
| Catches/stumpings | 40/– | 42/– | 93/– | 53/– |
Medal record
Men's Cricket
Representing India
ICC Cricket World Cup
| Winner | 1983 England and Wales |
ACC Asia Cup
| Winner | 1988 Bangladesh |
- Source: ESPNcricinfo, 10 November 2014

Krishnamachari "Kris" Srikkanth (Tamil: [sɾiːkaːnt̪];; born 21 December 1959), also known as Cheeka, is a former Indian cricket captain and coach. He also serves as a cricket commentator. He was a hard-hitting opening batter and an occasional right arm offbreak bowler. He has served as a captain of the Indian cricket team and chairman of the men's selection committee later.

Srikkanth was part of the Indian team that won the 1983 Cricket World Cup and top scored with 38 runs in the finals against the West Indies. He also won the 1985 World Championship of Cricket with the Indian team, in which he was the top run getter for India. He represented Tamil Nadu and South zone in Indian domestic cricket.

Srikkanth made his debut for the Indian team at the age of 21 in a One Day International (ODI) against England in Ahmedabad in November 1981. His test debut came two days later at Bombay. He scored two centuries in tests and four centuries in ODIs, all of which came in a three-year period between 1986 and 1988. In a match against New Zealand in December 1988, he scored 70 runs and took five wickets, becoming only the second cricketer to record the feat of scoring a fifty and taking a five for in the same ODI match.

Srikkanth was appointed as captain of the Indian team in 1989. He captained the team in four tests and 13 ODIs. He represented India at three Cricket World Cups and retired after the 1992 edition of the same. In a career that spanned over ten years, he scored more than 6,000 international runs. In 2019, he was awarded the C. K. Nayudu Lifetime Achievement Award by the Board of Control for Cricket in India.

== Early and personal life ==
Srikkanth was born on 21 December 1959 in Mylapore, Madras, Tamil Nadu to C. R. Krishnamachari and Indira Krishnamachari in a Tamil Brahmin family. He has two siblings, brother Krishnamachari Srinath and sister Srekala Bharath. He did his schooling from Vidya Mandir and completed his pre-university from Ramakrishna Mission Vivekananda College. He graduated as an electrical engineer from College of Engineering, Guindy. Srikkanth married Vidya on 30 March 1983. They have two sons, Adityaa and Anirudha, both of whom are also cricketers.

== Early career ==
Srikkanth represented Tamil Nadu and South zone in Indian domestic cricket. He made his first class debut during the 1978–79 season. He was the captain of the first ever youth test played by the India national under-19 cricket team in the 1978–79 season.

== International career ==
=== Debut and early years ===
Srikkanth made his One Day International (ODI) debut at the age of 21, against England in Ahmedabad on 25 November 1981. Opening the batting with Sunil Gavaskar, and India lost by 5 wickets. He made his Test debut two days later against England at Bombay.

=== 1983 World cup and rise ===
Srikkanth was part of the Indian cricket team that won the 1983 Cricket World Cup. He opened the batting and scored 156 runs in the tournament. In the final against West Indies, he top-scored with 38 runs. He was also part of the Indian team that won the 1985 World Championship of Cricket. He was the top scorer in the tournament with 238 runs. India won the final after beating Pakistan where he top scored with 67 runs from 77 balls and won the Man of the match award.

=== Middle years ===
Srikkanth has his most prolific years in terms of runs from 1986 to 1988 when he scored two centuries in tests and four centuries in ODIs. Srikkanth scored his first century in test cricket in the third test against Australia at Sydney on 2 January 1986. He scored his second and last test century against the visiting Pakistan at his home ground at M. A. Chidambaram Stadium, Chennai in February 1987. His first ODI century came against Australia on 7 September 1986 in Jaipur. He was also part of the Indian team that competed in the 1987 Cricket World Cup. He scored 70 runs and took five wickets against New Zealand in an ODI match at Visakhapatnam on 10 December 1988. In the process, he became the second person ever to record the feat of scoring a fifty and taking a five for in the same ODI match after Viv Richards.

=== Captaincy of national team ===
In 1989, he was appointed captain of the Indian team. Sachin Tendulkar made his debut under his captaincy in November 1989 against Pakistan. He served as the captain of the test team for four matches during the India's tour of Pakistan in 1990 and drew all the matches. He was dropped soon after due to a string of batting failures. He also captained the Indian team in 13 ODIs winning four and losing eight.

=== Later career and retirement ===
Srikkanth played his last test match in February 1992 against Australia in Perth. He scored 72 runs in the match and took five catches, all in the first innings setting a record for the most individual catches by a non wicket keeper in an innings of a test match. He was named as part of the Indian team that competed in the 1992 Cricket World Cup. Until 2021, he held the unusual record of scoring the only run ever scored in international cricket at Ray Mitchell Oval, in Mackay, Australia when India's match against Sri Lanka washed out after two deliveries. The venue has since hosted multiple women's internationals and 3 men's internationals. He retired from international cricket in March 1992 after the world cup with his last match coming against South Africa at Adelaide.

== Playing style ==
Srikkanth was an opening batsman, noted for his aggressive play and attacking cricketing strokes. He was known for his super-quick reflexes and scored majority of his runs through pulling and hooking or driving the ball. Though his batting style was in stark contrast to his long time opening partner Sunil Gavaskar, who was known for his reserved approach, Gavaskar himself has said that Srikkanth's batting liberated him to play his natural game. He targeted the new ball when it is hard and often scored his runs in the later years with hits over the infield when the fielding restrictions are in place during the initial overs. He is considered as one of the pioneers of pinch hitting in men's cricket, nearly a decade before Ian Botham and Mark Greatbatch tried it in the 1992 Cricket World Cup and Sanath Jayasuriya popularized it during the 1996 Cricket World Cup. He was described by cricketers and commentators as one of the most entertaining batters of his era.

== Post-retirement ==
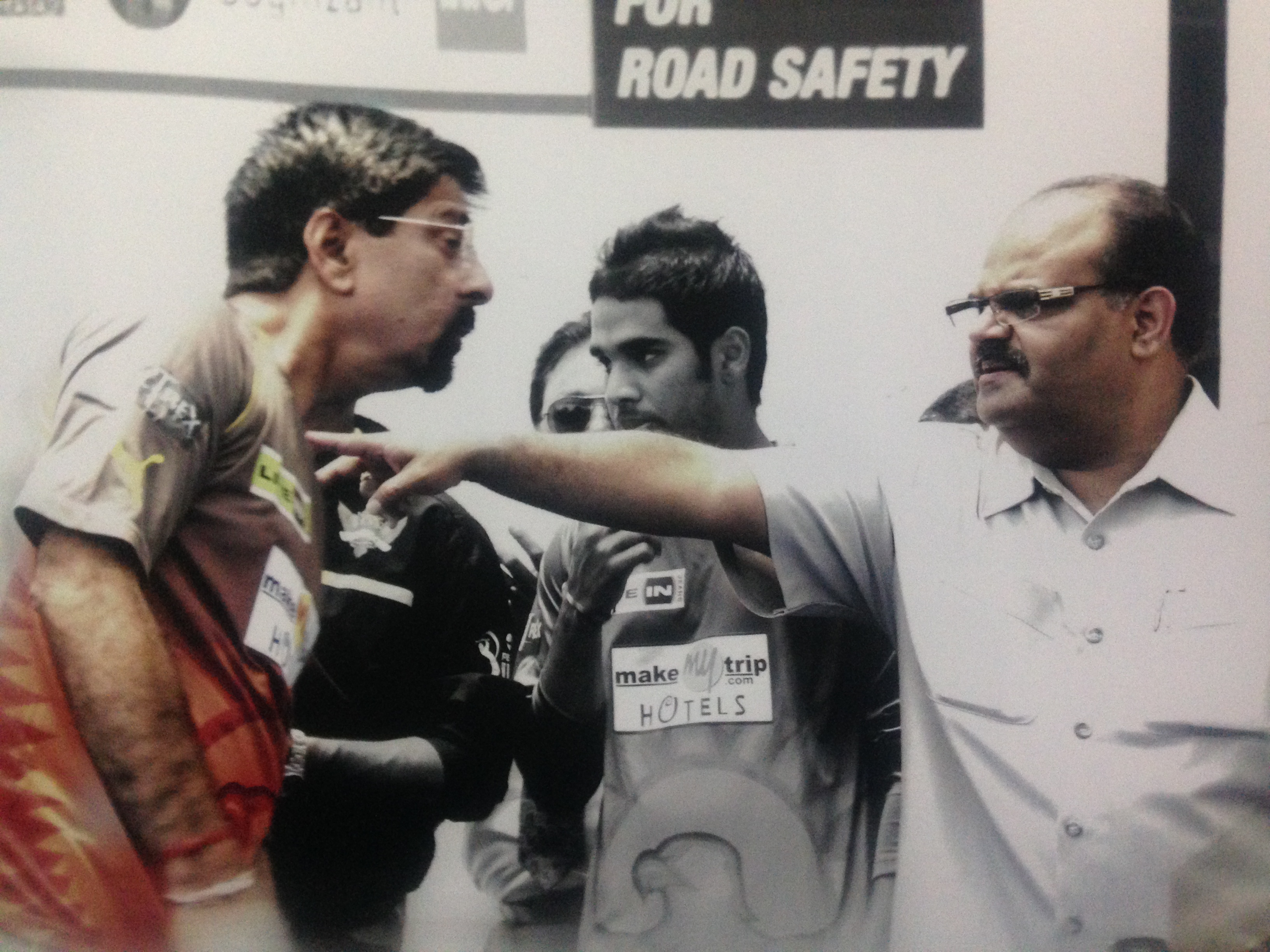
Srikkanth during his stint with Sunrisers Hyderabad in 2013

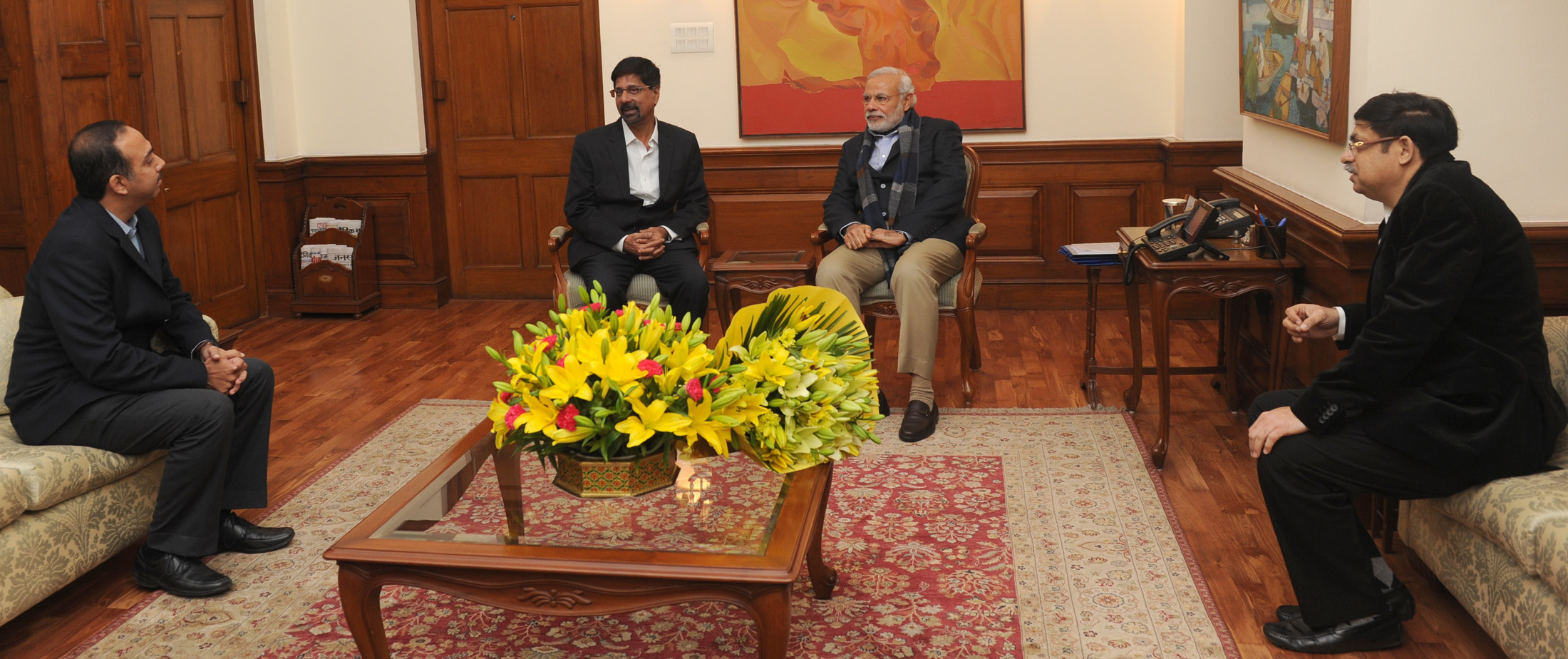
Srikkanth meeting with Prime Minister Narendra Modi in 2014

=== Coach and chief selector ===
Post retirement, Srikkanth served as the coach of the India A cricket team. On 18 February 2008, he was named as an ambassador for the Chennai Super Kings franchise for the inaugural season of the Indian Premier League (IPL) T20 competition. On 27 September 2008, he was appointed as the Chief Selector of the Indian cricket team and served in the position till 2011. The selection committee led by him picked up the Indian team that won its second ever Cricket World Cup in 2011. On 20 December 2012, he was named as the ambassador of the Sunrisers Hyderabad franchise in the IPL.

=== Commentator and administrator ===
Srikkanth serves as a sport commentator with various sports and news channels. He was nominated as a member of the panel of All India Council of Sports (AICS) in January 2020.

=== Television ===
In June 2013, Srikkanth participated in the sixth season of Jhalak Dikhhla Jaa, a dance competition. In February 2022, he participated in the first season of StarPlus's Smart Jodi as contestant with his wife Vidya.

| Year | Show | Role | Notes |
|---|---|---|---|
| 2013 | Jhalak Dikhhla Jaa 6 | Contestant | 15th place |
| 2022 | Smart Jodi 1 | Contestant | |

== Honors ==
In 2019, he was awarded the C. K. Nayudu Lifetime Achievement Award by the Board of Control for Cricket in India.

== Statistics ==
=== Runs ===
Srikkanth has scored 2,062 runs in 43 matches in tests at a batting average of 29.88. He has scored 4,091 runs in 146 ODI matches at an average of 29.01.

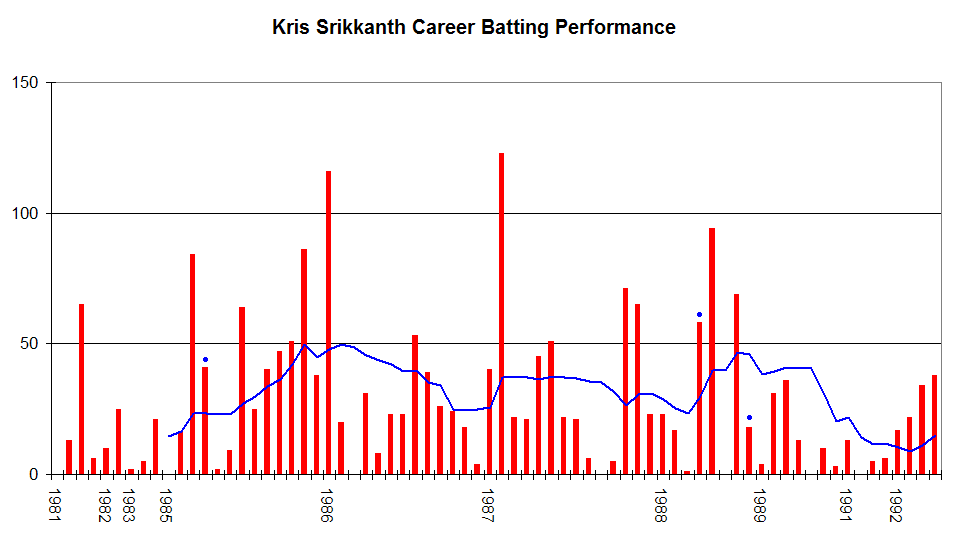
An innings-by-innings breakdown of Srikkanth's Test match batting career showing runs scored (red bars) and the average of the last ten innings (blue line)

=== Centuries ===
Srikkanth scored two centuries in tests and four centuries in ODIs.

Tests

| No. | Score | Against | Pos. | Inn. | Venue | H/A | Date | Result | Ref |
|---|---|---|---|---|---|---|---|---|---|
| 1 | 116 | Australia | 2 | 1 | Sydney Cricket Ground | Away | 2 January 1986 | Drawn | |
| 2 | 123 | Pakistan | 2 | 2 | M. A. Chidambaram Stadium, Chennai | Home | 3 February 1987 | Drawn | |

ODIs

| No. | Score | Against | Pos. | Inn. | Venue | H/A | Date | Result | Ref |
|---|---|---|---|---|---|---|---|---|---|
| 1 | 102 | Australia | 1 | 2 | Sawai Mansingh Stadium, Jaipur | Away | 7 September 1986 | Won | |
| 2 | 123 | Pakistan | 1 | 1 | Eden Gardens, Kolkata | Home | 18 February 1987 | Lost | |
| 3 | 101 | West Indies | 1 | 1 | Thiruvananthapuram Cricket stadium, Thiruvananthapuram | Home | 25 January 1988 | Lost | |
| 4 | 112 | West Indies | 1 | 1 | Sharjah Cricket Stadium, Sharjah | Neutral | 16 October 1988 | Won | |

=== Captaincy ===
In 1989, Srikkanth was appointed captain of the captain of the Indian team and served as the captain of the test team for four matches. He also captained the Indian team in 13 ODIs winning four and losing eight.

Srikkanth captaincy record
| Type | Matches | Won | Lost | Drawn | Tied | No result |
|---|---|---|---|---|---|---|
| Test | 4 | 0 | 0 | 4 | 0 | 0 |
| ODI | 13 | 4 | 8 | 0 | 0 | 1 |

== In popular culture ==
Jiiva played Srikanth in the Indian film 83 (2021).

=== YouTube Channel ===
He launched his official YouTube channel, Cheeky Cheeka, to engage with fans and share his insights on cricket. The channel features a range of content, including match analyses with his son Anirudha Srikkanth, personal anecdotes from his career, interviews with other cricketers, and commentary on current cricket events. Srikkanth's engaging style and cricket expertise have earned him a substantial following among fans.

| Preceded by Dilip Vengsarkar | Indian National Test Cricket Captain; 1989/90 | Succeeded by Mohammad Azharuddin |

| Preceded by Dilip Vengsarkar | Chairman, Selection Committee; September 2008 – present | Succeeded by Sandeep Patil |
