= Tahir Naqqash =

Pakistani cricketer (born 1959)

Personal information
- Born: 6 June 1959 (age 67); Lahore, Punjab, Pakistan
- Batting: Right-handed
- Bowling: Right-arm fast-medium
- Role: Bowler

International information
- National side: Pakistan
- Test debut (cap 92): 05 March 1982 v Sri Lanka
- Last Test: 09 February 1985 v New Zealand
- ODI debut (cap 36): 19 December 1980 v West Indies
- Last ODI: 03 November 1985 v Sri Lanka

Career statistics
Competition	Test	ODI
Matches	15	40
Runs scored	300	210
Batting average	21.42	15.00
100s/50s	0/1	0/1
Top score	57	61
Balls bowled	2,800	1,596
Wickets	34	34
Bowling average	41.11	36.47
5 wickets in innings	2	0
10 wickets in match	0	0
Best bowling	5/40	3/23
Catches/stumpings	3/–	11/–
- Source: CricInfo, 4 February 2006

Tahir Naqqash (born 6 June 1959) is a Pakistani former cricketer who played in 15 Test matches and 40 One Day Internationals from 1980 to 1985.

== Early life ==
Tahir Naqqash was born on 6 June 1959 in Lahore to Kashmiri parents.
