= Qasim Umar =

Kenyan-born Pakistani former cricketer (born 1957)

Personal information
- Full name: Qasim Ali Umar
- Born: 9 February 1957 (age 69); Nairobi, Kenya
- Batting: Right-handed
- Bowling: Right-arm medium

International information
- National side: Pakistan (1983–1987)
- Test debut (cap 96): 24 September 1983 v India
- Last Test: 20 November 1986 v West Indies
- ODI debut (cap 45): 10 September 1983 v India
- Last ODI: 7 January 1987 v England

Career statistics
Competition	Test	ODI
Matches	26	31
Runs scored	1502	642
Batting average	36.63	22.92
100s/50s	3/5	0/4
Top score	210	69
Balls bowled	6	–
Wickets	0	–
Bowling average	–	–
5 wickets in innings	–	–
10 wickets in match	–	–
Best bowling	–	–
Catches/stumpings	15/–	4/–
- Source: Cricinfo, 4 February 2006

Qasim Ali Umar (Urdu: قاسم عمر; born 9 February 1957) is a Kenyan-born Pakistani former cricketer. He was the first black Pakistani cricketer who played in 26 Test matches and 31 One Day Internationals between 1983 and 1987 for the Pakistani national cricket team before getting banned for admitting his involvement in spot fixing.

Umar was a capable opening batsman as well as having the ability to bat anywhere in the middle order. He matriculated from the prestigious private boys' school, St Paul's English High School, in Karachi, on a cricket scholarship in 1974.

Born in Kenya, Umar migrated to Pakistan with his family in 1957. His mother was Kenyan, and due to his East African features, he was often mistaken as a member of the Sheedi community.

After the ban, he left Pakistan to settle down in Manchester, United Kingdom.

In 2018, Karachi Municipal Corporation named a fly-over after him near National Stadium, Karachi.

== Controversies ==
In 1985–86, he became the first player to make claims on the impact of recreational and performance-enhancing drugs in cricket.

Umar also accepted gifts and accused his teammates of indulging in sexual relations with prostitutes in return for underperforming in certain matches.

== See also ==
- List of Test cricketers born in non-Test playing nations
