= Azeem Hafeez =

Pakistani cricketer (born 1963)

Personal information
- Born: 29 July 1963 (age 63); Jhelum, Pakistan
- Batting: Left-handed
- Bowling: Left-arm fast-medium

International information
- National side: Pakistan
- Test debut (cap 95): 14 September 1983 v India
- Last Test: 09 February 1985 v New Zealand
- ODI debut (cap 44): 10 September 1983 v India
- Last ODI: 10 March 1985 v India

Career statistics
Competition	Test	ODI	FC
Matches	18	15	85
Runs scored	134	45	923
Batting average	8.37	15.00	11.39
100s/50s	0/0	0/0	0/1
Top score	24	15	69
Balls bowled	4,351	719	13,793
Wickets	63	15	235
Bowling average	34.98	39.06	33.32
5 wickets in innings	4	0	9
10 wickets in match	0	0	1
Best bowling	6/46	4/22	7/54
Catches/stumpings	1/–	3/–	17/–
- Source: Cricinfo, 26 August 2018

Raja Azeem Hafeez (born 29 July 1963) is a Pakistani former cricketer who played 18 Test matches for the national team from 1983 to 1985.

A left-arm fast bowler, Hafeez was born with two fingers missing on his right (non-bowling) hand. Hafeez could never establish a regular place for himself in the Pakistan team, predominantly because of the strength of its fast bowling at that time, anchored by Wasim Akram and Waqar Younis.

== Biography ==
Raja Azeem Hafeez was born on 29 July 1963 in Jhelum. Despite being born with fingers on his right hand, Hafeez became a successful swing bowler.

Hafeez began his career at the inter-collegiate and club levels in Karachi, including in the Nazimabad Super Cup. He played for Pak Crescent, a leading Karachi club, and was effective in batting and fielding despite his physical limitation.

His performances in Under-19 matches against Australia led to his entry into first-class cricket with Allied Bank under the captaincy of Shoaib Habib.
