= Ravi Shastri =

India cricket player, coach and commentator (born 1962)

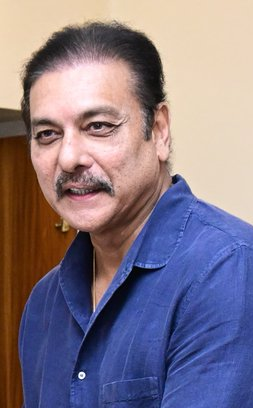
- Shastri in 2024

Personal information
- Full name: Ravishankar Jayadritha Shastri
- Born: 27 May 1962 (age 64); Bombay, India
- Height: 1.91 m (6 ft 3 in)
- Batting: Right-handed
- Bowling: Slow left-arm orthodox
- Role: Batting all-rounder

International information
- National side: India (1981–1992)
- Test debut (cap 151): 21 February 1981 v New Zealand
- Last Test: 26 December 1992 v South Africa
- ODI debut (cap 36): 25 November 1981 v England
- Last ODI: 17 December 1992 v South Africa

Domestic team information
- Years: Team
- 1979–1993: Bombay
- 1987–1991: Glamorgan

Career statistics
Competition	Test	ODI	FC	LA
Matches	80	150	245	278
Runs scored	3,830	3,108	13,202	6,383
Batting average	35.79	29.04	44.00	31.12
100s/50s	11/12	4/18	34/66	6/38
Top score	206	109	217	138*
Balls bowled	15,751	6,613	42,425	11,966
Wickets	151	129	509	254
Bowling average	40.96	36.04	32.89	32.18
5 wickets in innings	2	1	18	5
10 wickets in match	0	0	3	0
Best bowling	5/75	5/15	9/101	5/13
Catches/stumpings	36/–	40/–	141/–	84/–
Medal record
Men's cricket
Representing India
ICC Cricket World Cup
Winner	1983 England & Wales
ACC Asia Cup
Winner	1984 UAE
Winner	1990–91 India
Representing India as Coach
ICC World Test Championship
Runner-up	2019-2021
- Source: Cricinfo, 6 September 2008

Ravishankar Jayadritha Shastri (born 27 May 1962) is an Indian cricket commentator, former professional cricketer and former head coach of the India national cricket team. As a player, he played for the India national cricket team between 1981 and 1992 in both Test matches and One Day Internationals. Although he started his career as a left arm spin bowler, he later transformed into a batting all-rounder. Shastri was a member of the Indian team that won the 1983 Cricket World Cup. He won the C. K. Nayudu Lifetime Achievement Award at the Indian cricket team annual award show NAMAN in 2024.

As a cricketer, Shastri was essentially defensive with his trademark "chapati" (a flick off the pads), but he could raise his strike rate when required. Due to his above-average height (he stood 6' 3" tall) and an upright stance, he had a limited number of shots against fast bowling, but was able to put the lofted shot to good use against spin bowling. Ravi played either as an opening batsman or in the middle order.

The highlight of his career was when he was elected Champion of Champions in the World Championship of Cricket in Australia in 1985. In the same season, on 10 January 1985, he equaled West Indian Garry Sobers's record of hitting six sixes in an over in first class cricket. He was regarded as a potential captain, but his image outside cricket, injuries and tendency to lose form at crucial times meant that he captained India in only one Test match.

In domestic cricket, he played for Bombay and led them to the Ranji Trophy title in his final year of playing. He also played four seasons of county cricket for Glamorgan. He was forced to retire aged 31 due to a recurring knee injury. He has done commentary on behalf of BCCI in the matches that India play. In 2014, he became the director of Indian cricket team for a period of eight months from India's tour of England until the 2015 World Cup. On 13 July 2017, he was appointed as the head coach of Indian cricket team. On 16 August 2019, he was re-appointed as the head coach of the senior men's Indian team and remained in charge until the 2021 ICC T20 World Cup.

== Personal life ==
Ravishankar Jayadritha Shastri is of Mangalorean descent, was born on 27 May 1962 in Bombay and studied at Don Bosco High School, Matunga. As a teenager, he took to cricket seriously. Playing for Don Bosco, Shastri reached the final of the 1976 inter-school Giles Shield, finally losing to St Mary's, whose lineup included two future Ranji players, Shishir Hattiangadi and Jignesh Sanghani. The next year, under Shastri's captaincy, Don Bosco won the Giles Shield in 1977, the first time in the history of that school. At school, his coach was B. D. Desai, once a Tatas and Dadar Union player. While Don Bosco was not traditionally a major force in schools cricket, the R. A. Podar College, where Shastri later studied commerce, produced many good cricketers. Vasant Amladi and, in particular, V. S. "Marshall" Patil, were integral figures in Shastri's development as a cricketer.

When not in Mumbai, Shastri lives in Alibaug.

On 18 March 1990, Shastri married Ritu Singh. They have one daughter named Alekha Shastri. After 22 years of marriage, Shastri filed for divorce.

== Domestic career ==
In his last year at the junior college, he was selected to represent the Bombay team in the Ranji Trophy. At 17 years and 292 days, he was then the youngest cricketer to play for Bombay.

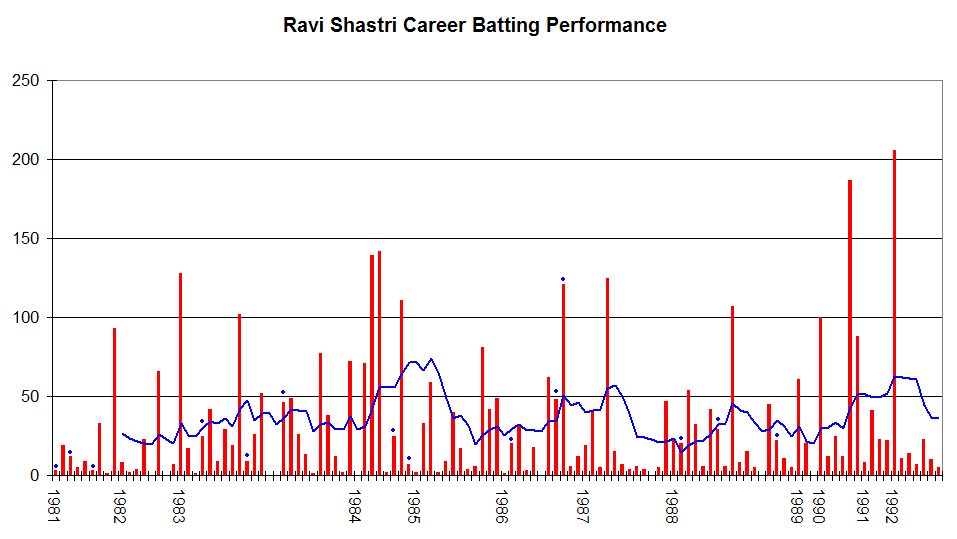
Ravi Shastri's career graph

An Indian under-19 team was scheduled to tour Pakistan in 1980–81. Shastri was included in the coaching camp at the last minute by the National Coach Hemu Adhikari. Shastri captained one of the two teams in a trial game and was then asked to lead the Indian Under-19 team. The tour, however, was cancelled. The team later went to Sri Lanka, but the games were frequently interrupted by rain.

His only notable achievement in his first two Ranji seasons were bowling figures of 6-61, which he took against Delhi in the 1979–80 Ranji final that Bombay lost. While he was playing against Uttar Pradesh at Kanpur in the next season, he was called up to the squad touring New Zealand to stand in for the injured left arm spinner Dilip Doshi. Shastri arrived in Wellington the night before the first Test. His first over in Test cricket was a maiden to the New Zealand captain Geoff Howarth. In the second innings, he took 3 wickets in four balls, all to catches by Dilip Vengsarkar, to bring a quick close to the New Zealand innings. In the third Test, his seven wickets won him the man of the match award, while his 15 wickets in the series were the highest for either team.

The Ranji final of 1984/85 turned out to be one of the finest matches in Indian domestic cricket history. A sleepy Gavaskar won the toss and batted. He could hardly close his eyes before Bombay was 3 down for 42. Batting at No.5, he scored his 20th and last Ranji Trophy hundred and took Bombay to 333. Shastri made 29 before he was bowled attempting to cut an arm–ball. Delhi was in early trouble before they were rescued by Chetan Chauhan, batting with a fractured finger in his last first class match. Ajay Sharma, in his first season, scored a hundred and took Delhi into the lead with nine wickets down.

The rules of the competition specified that in the event of a draw, the team with the first innings lead would be declared the winners. With two days and 100 minutes left, Bombay went for quick runs. A crowd of about 46,000 turned up for match on the fourth day and the organizers ran out of tickets. Shastri top scored with 76 as Bombay set Delhi 300 to win in a day and ninety minutes.

Except for the odd delivery, the ball spun slowly and afforded enough time for the batsmen to play their strokes. Early on the final day, Delhi reached 95 for no loss and then collapsed. His first wicket was Chauhan who was declared out caught behind with the ball having spun across the face of the bat without apparently touching it. The match changed dramatically and the batsmen lost their head. Gursharan Singh was lbw playing no stroke, Kirti Azad played on, Surinder Khanna was stumped after a few slogs. Shastri took 8 for 91; Bombay won by 90 runs. In the 50th year of Ranji trophy, it was their 30th title.

After the tour of Australia in 1985–86, he also began to decline as a bowler. Bombay lost to Haryana in the semifinal of the Ranji trophy but West Zone won the Duleep Trophy. His major contribution was as a bowler in the semifinal against North Zone on a flat wicket at Trivandrum. Like in the Ranji final, North looked the likely winner going into the last day, before he took 8 for 145.

He scored hundreds in the quarterfinal and semifinal of the Duleep trophy, but West Zone lost to South on first innings lead in the latter match. Shastri's only other score over fifty in the season was a particularly dull 125 against Pakistan in the Jaipur Test. He did well enough to be the man of the one day series. In the first one-day match against Pakistan he captained India for the first time, scoring 50 and taking three wickets. He took four wickets at Calcutta and 69* at Hyderabad in two thrilling finishes. Later at Nagpur with India facing a big target, he scored 52 in 40 balls.

In 1987, Glamorgan contracted Shastri to play for them. He stayed with them until 1991, with a break in 1990 due to India's tour of England. Shastri's presence did little for the fortunes of the county which finished at the bottom of the first class table in two of those seasons. Shastri topped 1000 runs in 1989 and scored hundreds in both innings against Middlesex. His best bowling performance of 7 for 49 (11 for 90) in the match came against Lancashire in 1988, where he got bounce and turn and was 'unplayable' according to Wisden. The almanack noticed that Shastri was already becoming reluctant to bowl.

1988 was by far the best of the seasons for Glamorgan in one day matches. They finished 5th in the Sunday League – up from 14 in 1987 – and reached the semifinal of the Benson & Hedges Cup. Shastri won the leading six hitter award for the Sunday league matches of 1988 with 14 sixes. He was part of the MCC team that played a Rest of the World team in the MCC bicentennial match at Lord's in 1987.

Bombay breezed through the West Zone league of the 1993–94 Ranji Trophy winning all four matches – a very rare feat – by big margins. With the Test players away, Shastri captained the young team in the knockout matches. Bombay defeated Haryana by an innings and 202 runs in the pre quarter final but ran into trouble against Karnataka in the next round. Against 406, Bombay lost their first six for 174, before Shastri and Sairaj Bahutule added 259 in six hours. Shastri's individual score was 151. Bombay survived the best part of the last day to win on first innings lead. Shastri scored 612 runs in the season and took 17 wickets at 15. Bombay went on to beat Bengal in a low scoring final to lift the Ranji Trophy. It was their first championship since the famous win against Delhi nine years ago.

In September 1994, while in Sri Lanka covering the Singer World Series, Shastri announced his retirement from first class cricket.

== International career ==
=== Early days ===
Within eighteen months of his Test debut, Shastri had moved up from tenth position in the batting order to being an opening batsman. "His calm, sensible batting lower in the order", wrote Wisden, commenting on his first series, "raised promise of his developing into a useful all-rounder, and his fielding too was an asset". By the end of his career, he had batted in every position from one to ten. By his own admission, he ignored his bowling in favour of his batting. This was reflected in his performances. However, his figures of 9–101 in the season-opening 1981 Irani Trophy stood as a tournament record for nearly twenty years.

It was the failure of the regular openers Pranab Roy and Ghulam Parkar that led to Shastri being made to open at the Oval against England in 1982. He distinguished himself by scoring 66 runs in that match. An injury in the webbing of his hand ruled him out of four of the Tests to be played in Pakistan. Forced again to open in the final Test at Karachi, against the fast bowling of Imran Khan (then at the peak of his career), he scored his first Test hundred. He later made another hundred against the West Indies in Antigua. Indian Cricket was impressed enough to suggest that, given time, he could become one of the best batsmen in the Indian team.

Shastri was not selected to play in most of the important matches in the 1983 World Cup. In the series against the West Indies later that year, he again distinguished himself with his bold effort in batting against the domineering West Indian pace bowlers.

=== The glorious winter ===
In October 1984, India toured Pakistan for the third time in six years. The Lahore Test saw India collapse to 156 against Pakistan's 428, and follow on. India went into the last day trailing by 92 with six wickets in hand but were saved by a fifth wicket partnership of 126 between Shastri and Mohinder Amarnath. Shastri scored 71, while Amarnath made 101*. Shastri was even more successful in the next Test at Faisalabad, where he scored 139 and shared a stand of 200 with Sandeep Patil. The last Test and the remainder of the tour were cancelled because of the assassination of Indira Gandhi.

There were already signals that Shastri was being groomed as a future captain. Indian captain Sunil Gavaskar was coming to the end of his career and Kapil Dev, who had led India in the previous season, was expected to succeed him. Shastri appeared to be the next in line. He led the Young India team to Zimbabwe in early 1984. Against the touring English team in November, he led the India Under–25 to an innings win - the first defeat of England in a tour match in India for fifty years.

Around this time, Shastri also began to open the innings regularly in one day games. He scored 102 against Australia in October – India's second hundred in ODIs – and made the same score against England at Cuttack in December. Shastri had stood in for Gavaskar and opened with Srikkanth in two matches of the 1983 World Cup. The third time that they opened was at Cuttack and they set a world record of 188 for the first wicket. Later in the season, this partnership was to form the foundation for the Indian triumph in the WCC in Australia.

Shastri's success continued in Test matches against England. In the Bombay Test his 235 run stand with wicket-keeper Syed Kirmani led to victory for India. His 142 improved upon the 139 at Faisalabad as his highest score.

In the third Test at Kolkata, Shastri made 111 in 357 balls and 455 minutes, though his innings was heavily interrupted by rain. With Mohammad Azharuddin he added 214 for the fifth wicket, another Indian record. When India started the second innings late in the final day, he was sent in to open, thus becoming one of the few batsmen to bat on all five days of a Test.

Shastri set another record for Bombay against Baroda in a West Zone Ranji match. His first hundred came up in 72 minutes and 80 balls and included nine fours and four sixes. The second took just 41 minutes and 43 balls. His 123 ball, 113-minute 200* became the fastest double hundred in first class history, beating the previous record by 7 minutes, and included 13 fours and 13 sixes. Six of the sixes came off a single over of the left arm spinner Tilak Raj. In terms of the number of sixes, it bettered the 58-year-old Indian record of CK Nayudu who had struck 11 sixes against a touring MCC team at Bombay Gymkhana in 1926–7. Shastri's unfinished sixth wicket stand of 204* with Ghulam Parkar, who contributed only 33 to the partnership, took only 83 minutes. In Baroda's second innings, Shastri took two wickets in four overs.

=== World Championship of Cricket - 1985 ===
Except for a few series in Pakistan and the 1983 World Cup final, the World Championship of Cricket in Australia was the first time overseas cricket matches were shown live in India. The WCC saw India win every match convincingly. The WCC was conceived as a celebration of the 150th year of the formation of Victoria, but the finalists turned out to be India and Pakistan.

Shastri had a slow start to the tournament but finished with fifties in the last three matches. Srikkanth too scored three fifties and India posted century opening stands against Australia and in the final. India went in with two spinners for every match. It helped that all the matches were played at Melbourne and Sydney which have turning tracks and long boundaries. Sivaramakrishnan and Shastri claimed 18 wickets between them in five matches.

For his 182 runs and 8 wickets, Shastri was chosen as the man of the series which in this tournament was called 'The Champion of Champions'. He won an Audi 100 car for his efforts. By the special order of Prime Minister Rajiv Gandhi, Indian customs waived the heavy duty its import would have normally entailed.

=== Vice-Captaincy 1985 ===
Two weeks later India won the Rothman's cup in Sharjah beating Pakistan and Australia. The victory against Pakistan was particularly memorable because India defended a total of only 125. Shastri and Siva continued their successful partnership with the ball. It was for this tournament that Shastri served as the Indian vice captain for the first time. Gavaskar had announced his decision to resign his captaincy at the end of the WCC before the tournament began. Before the final, former Australian captain Ian Chappell suggested that for the good of Indian cricket, Gavaskar should continue as the captain until Shastri could take over from him.

Shastri continued as vice captain to Kapil Dev in the 1985–86 season. This season and the England tour of 1986 were ordinary ones for him. Australia, Sri Lanka and Pakistan toured India in 1986–87. Shastri played a crucial role in the Tied Test at Madras against Australia, scoring 62 and 48*. When Indian middle order collapsed and India fell behind the run rate, his two sixes in quick succession off off–spinner Greg Matthews came in handy. In the final Test at Bombay he scored 121*. As was becoming increasingly common, it was played in first and fourth gear. He hung around for around 30 minutes for the last run for his fifty and twice as long in the nineties. Yet he hit six sixes, three of which came after he completed his hundred. The huge six off left arm fast bowler Bruce Reid – a cross batted heave that went over longon – was particularly memorable. Six sixes in an innings was an Indian record at the time. But he was outshone by Dilip Vengsarkar who scored 164* in the same innings. They added a record 298* for the sixth wicket.

In early 1987, he presented a 15-minute coaching series which went by the name 'That's Cricket'. This was aired on the national channel Doordarshan on Sunday mornings. There were even rumours of an involvement with actress Amrita Singh.

India lost the final Test at Bangalore to lose the 1986–87 series against Pakistan. Kapil Dev was widely criticised in the media for his captaincy. The selectors retained him as captain in the Reliance World Cup at the beginning of the 1987–88 season. Shastri failed with the bat in the Reliance Cup but formed a successful bowling partnership with Maninder Singh, another left arm spinner. India topped its group but went down to England in the semifinal. Kapil Dev received more criticisms for skying a catch to deep midwicket when a win was still a possibility.

=== Captaincy issues 1987 ===
About this time, Vengsarkar emerged as the strongest candidate to take over from Kapil. He had had a dream run with the bat, starting from the series in England in 1986. In 1987, the newly established Deloitte ratings (the forerunner of the current LG ratings) ranked him the best batsman in the world. The Indian selectors have conventionally leaned towards making the best player of the team the captain. So before the home series against West Indies, Kapil was sacked and Vengsarkar was made the Indian captain.

Vengsarkar had his left arm fractured in the third Test and Shastri captained India for the only time in his Test career. On an underprepared turning track in Madras, India won the toss and elected to bat first. Debutant Narendra Hirwani took 16 for 136 as India won by 255 runs to draw the series 1–1. Apart from this, Shastri did little with bat or ball. West Indies won 7 of the eight one day matches, he was the captain in six of them. Vengsarkar meanwhile picked up a six-month ban from BCCI for writing newspaper columns. So Shastri continued as the captain for a three nations tournament in Sharjah in April. Sri Lanka and New Zealand were the other teams and India won easily.

=== Sacking and vice captaincy 1989 ===
India travelled to West Indies in early 1989. Though a failure overall, Shastri played the best innings by either team in the series. It came at Bridgetown in the second Test. India trailed by 56 in the first innings and lost the six second innings wickets for 63. Batting at No.3, Shastri was last out for a courageous 107 out of 251 all out. Looking back at the end of his career, he was to consider this his finest innings. The bowlers were Malcolm Marshall, Curtly Ambrose, Courtney Walsh and Ian Bishop and the pitch, difficult.

On the way back many of the Indian players took part in an exhibition match in United States. BCCI suspended the players. Though the suspension was later revoked, Vengsarkar was sacked. Srikkanth became the new captain and Shastri, yet again, the deputy. After an indifferent series in Pakistan, both were excluded from the tour of New Zealand in 1990. Azharuddin led an experimental team which a selector called the 'team of the nineties'. Within a few weeks, the phrase got the status of a joke. Shastri was recalled for the tour to England that summer as the vice-captain.

=== The Indian summer ===
Shastri's career generally remained a struggle until the England tour of 1990 where he scored two hundreds in the three Test rubber. Opening the innings for India, he began with an even 100 in India's reply to a huge England score at Lord's. It was a hard-working innings and Shastri played and missed often with most of the runs came with his usual flicks and nudges. Towards the end of his innings, he grew aggressive, reaching his hundred by hitting the English off-spinner Eddie Hemmings for two fours and a six in an over, and departed immediately attempting another big hit.

He topped this with 187 at the Oval. Journalist and commentator Harsha Bhogle's description of this innings holds true for many of Shastri's major efforts:

Watching Shastri bat is like admiring the Qutub Minar; tall, timeless, solid. You admire it for the virtues, not for its style. For nine hours and 21 minutes, he chiselled away the England attack and the sculpture that he left behind represented perseverance and craft. There was the usual stoic, expressionless face under the helmet, but you could see the determination in his eyes as he planted himself at the wicket, struck root and bore fruit.

Only occasionally, the bat wavered in its resolve but the mind put it on the right path again, almost in admonishment, and the bat grew broader and straighter ... He may never be a Gavaskar, but he at least represents the great man's virtues, even if by proxy. It would be a relief too, to know that he will never throw away his wicket for nobody guards his crease more fiercely.

Following the innings at the Oval, Shastri scored his career best score of 217 in the Irani trophy in the opening match of the Indian season and a top score of 88 on a very bad wicket in the Chandigarh Test against Sri Lanka. He carried his bat for 101* against the same opponents in a one-day match a week later, reaching the hundred with a two off the last ball. Next year in South Africa's first-ever ODI series on their return to international cricket, he scored 109 at Delhi, his fourth and last one day hundred. A series of abandoned tours meant India played few matches at home at this time.

At the end of 1991, India travelled to Australia for a five Test series, to be followed by the World Cup. Channel 9 dubbed it the Indian Summer. The series was a disaster for India – they lost four of the Tests – and was rife with umpiring controversies. But it also saw the final flourishes in the careers of Shastri and Kapil Dev.

Shastri took 5 wickets for 15 runs against Australia in an early match in the World Series Cup. It was then the best bowling figures by an Indian in ODIs. Most of the wickets were gratuitously earned, though – three batsmen were caught on the legside boundary and another stumped. In the third Test at Sydney, he scored his only double hundred in Test cricket, the first by an Indian against Australia. He was dropped in the sixties by the Australian leg-spinner Shane Warne, who was making his debut, off his own bowling. Amidst frequent interruptions by rain, he completed his hundred early on the fourth day and a six off Warne brought up the 150. He finally fell to a tired shot at Warne after nine and a half hours, scoring 206 with 17 fours and the two sixes, thus becoming Warne's first Test wicket.

It was also during this innings that the knee injury that would soon end his career appeared for the first time. India had gone into the match with four pace bowlers and no regular spinners. Shastri was little more than a part-time bowler by this time. By the final day, pitch started taking spin. Shastri took four wickets in the second innings and Australia just about beat the clock to draw the match. India could well have won the match with another spinner.

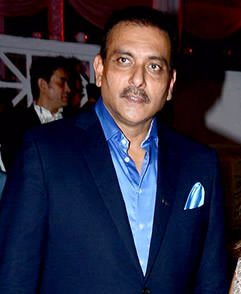
Ravi Shastri in 2015

=== Late career ===
The remaining WSC matches followed the Sydney Test. In the second final against Australia Shastri worsened the knee injury. At the later stages of the innings he was forced to stand and slog. After a few quick runs, it ended in an inevitable mishit to cover. He missed the remaining two Test matches, both of which India lost. For a while it seemed doubtful that he would be able to play the World Cup which was being hosted by Australia and New Zealand, but was included at the last moment.

In their second match, India chased 238 to win in 50 overs against Australia. A rain interruption meant that the target was revised to 236 in 47 overs. Shastri took 67 balls for his 25; India went on to lose by one run. He was blamed for the defeat and dropped from the remaining matches of the tournament.

In the next season, South Africa hosted India for their first ever tour. Shastri opened in all four Tests and struggled to score runs. The only bright spot was a 16 ball 27 not out, in India's one day win at Centurion park. He had batted down the order in the one day matches of this series. In reference to the World Cup innings against Australia, he commented later that for once he knew what his exact role was.

India hosted England immediately after the South Africa series. The knee injury returned before the series and put Shastri out of cricket for eight months. He never again represented India in international cricket.

== Post-retirement ==
He made his debut as a TV commentator with the World Masters Tournament in Mumbai in March 1995. In 2003, he collaborated in starting up Showdiff Worldwide, a celebrity management company. He has since served ICC and BCCI in temporary official capacities and as a UNICEF Goodwill Ambassador. Some of his temporary shows, such as Super Spells, still run Star Sports and related channels. He and fellow commentator Sunil Gavaskar ended their long-term associations with ESPN-STAR Sports in April 2008 as they were contracted by the BCCI as commentators for lucrative Indian Premier League which was broadcast by rival network Sony Max. 2008 also held great significance for Shastri as he became the father of Alekha at the age of 46. He temporarily coached the Indian cricket team for their 2007 Bangladesh tour. He was named the Celebrity Torchbearer for the Oman Leg of the 2008 Summer Olympics torch relay.

== Coaching career ==
In July 2017 Shastri, the former team director, was appointed as Head Coach for the national team by the Cricket Advisory Committee (CAC), comprising Sourav Ganguly, Sachin Tendulkar and VVS Laxman. The contract has him getting paid Rs. 8 crore per year. Rs. 1.5 Crore more than his predecessor Anil Kumble. As the World cup 2019 was in progress, on 13 June, the BCCI announced an extension of Shastri's contract by 45 days after the tournament. On 16 August 2019, he was re-appointed as the head coach of the senior men's Indian team, with his new contract extending up to the 2021 ICC T20 World Cup in UAE.

== Legends League Cricket ==
In November 2021, Shastri retired from coaching national cricket team and joined the Legends League Cricket as the commissioner.

== In popular culture ==
A Bollywood film Azhar released in 2016, directed by Tony D'Souza, revolves around Match fixing scandals in late 90s and 2000 and role of Mohammad Azharuddin in the scandal. Shastri's character was portrayed by Gautam Gulati in the film. However, the film portrayed Shastri's character in highly negative light as it depicts him as a Womaniser. Due to the negative depiction, Shastri slammed the makers of the film and further said that he has no intentions of watching the movie.

The 2021 Indian film 83, which is based on India's World Cup win, features Dhairya Karwa portraying Shastri's character.

Preceded by Dilip Vengsarkar	Indian National Test Cricket Captain; 1987/88 (1 Test Match)	Succeeded by Dilip Vengsarkar
Preceded by Greg Chappell	Indian Cricket Team Coach/Manager; 2007	Succeeded by Chandu Borde
