= List of hat-tricks in the Ranji Trophy =

In the sport of cricket, a hat-trick is an occasion where a bowler takes three wickets in consecutive deliveries. As of 2 January 2018, this feat has been achieved 76 times since 1934 in the Ranji Trophy, the domestic first-class cricket championship played in India. The first Ranji Trophy hat-trick was taken by Baqa Jilani. The most recent bowler to achieve the feat was Ravi Yadav. Joginder Rao is the only player to take three hat-tricks in the Ranji Trophy. After taking a hat-trick against Uttar Pradesh, Ravi Yadav became the first bowler to pick up a hat-trick in his first over on first-class debut.

== Ranji Trophy hat-tricks ==
Key
| Symbol | Meaning |
|---|---|
| Bowler | The name of the bowler |
| For | The team for which the bowler was playing |
| Against | The team against which the bowler was playing |
| Venue | The venue where the hat-trick was achieved |
| Season | The Season in which the hat-trick was achieved |

List of Ranji trophy hat-tricks
| No. | Bowler | For | Against | Venue | Dismissals | Season |
|---|---|---|---|---|---|---|
| 1 | Baqa Jilani | Northern India | Southern Punjab | Alexandra Ground, Amritsar | Lall Singh; Joginder Singh; Yuvraj of Patiala | 1934/35 |
| 2 | Mubarak Ali | Nawanagar | Western India | Poona Club Ground, Poona | Akbar Khan; Hari Mali; Shanoor Khan | 1936/37 |
| 3 | Thomas Longfield | Bengal | Bihar | Rangers Ground, Calcutta | Edward Leigh; Subir Chakravorty; J. Das Gupta | 1937/38 |
| 4 | Jehangir Khot | Bombay | Baroda | Brabourne Stadium, Bombay | Vivek Hazare; Subbanna Nayudu; Mahipatrao Indulkar | 1943/44 |
| 5 | D. Narottam | Kathiawar | Baroda | Dhrol | Chandrasen Gaekwad; Vivek Hazare; Ahmed Patel | 1947/48 |
| 6 | Sarobindu Banerjee | Bihar | Delhi | Keenan Stadium, Jamshedpur | Ishwar Dayal; Hargopal Singh; Gian Kapoor | 1948/49 |
| 7 | Chandu Sarwate | Holkar | Bihar | Keenan Stadium, Jamshedpur | L. Sterling; N. Chakrabarty; D. S. Khambatta | 1948/49 |
| 8 | Probir Sen | Bengal | Orissa | Barabati Stadium, Cuttack | T. Ram Sastry; Tamayya Sastri; Nimal Padhi | 1954/55 |
| 9 | Venkatappa Muddiah | Services | Eastern Punjab | Roshanara Club Ground, Delhi | | 1955/56 |
| 10 | Vasant Ranjane | Maharashtra | Saurashtra | National Defence Academy Ground, Khadakvasla | | 1956/57 |
| 11 | Nandi Khanna | Southern Punjab | Jammu and Kashmir | Baradari Ground, Patiala | | 1959/60 |
| 12 | Nyalchand Shah | Saurashtra | Baroda | Sahu Club Ground, Dharangadhra | | 1961/62 |
| 13 | Hiralal Gaekwad | Madhya Pradesh | Rajasthan | Garrison Ground, Jabalpur | | 1962/63 |
| 14 | Umesh Kulkarni | Bombay | Gujarat | Shastri Maidan, Anand | | 1963/64 |
| 15 | Subhash Jhanji | Uttar Pradesh | Vidarbha | Vidarbha Cricket Association Ground, Nagpur | | 1963/64 |
| 16 | Joginder Rao | Services | Jammu and Kashmir | Army Headquarters, Delhi | Tahir Firdausi; Vijay Kumar Malhotra; Abdul Rauf | 1963/64 |
| 17 | Joginder Rao | Services | Northern Punjab | Gandhi Sports Complex Ground, Amritsar | Suresh Sharma; Brij Mohan Khanna; Bhupinder Singh | 1963/64 |
| 18 | Joginder Rao | Services | Northern Punjab | Gandhi Sports Complex Ground, Amritsar | Rajinder Kale; Ramnath Paul; Bishan Singh Bedi | 1963/64 |
| 19 | Ravinder Pal | Delhi | Southern Punjab | Sector 16 Stadium, Chandigarh | | 1965/66 |
| 20 | Bishan Singh Bedi | Delhi | Punjab | Feroz Shah Kotla, Delhi | Surindernath; Rajinder Pal; Harminder Singh | 1968/69 |
| 21 | Kailash Gattani | Rajasthan | Uttar Pradesh | Dr Sampurnanda Stadium, Varanasi | | 1969/70 |
| 22 | Mehboodullah Khan | Uttar Pradesh | Madhya Pradesh | KD Singh Babu Stadium, Lucknow | | 1971/72 |
| 23 | B. S. Kalyanasundaram | Tamil Nadu | Bombay | Madras Cricket Club Ground, Madras | | 1972/73 |
| 24 | Abdul Ismail | Bombay | Saurashtra | Brabourne Stadium, Bombay | | 1973/74 |
| 25 | Raghuram Bhat | Karnataka | Bombay | M Chinnaswamy Stadium, Bangalore | Ghulam Parkar; Ashok Mankad; Suru Nayak | 1981/82 |
| 26 | Bharat Arun | Tamil Nadu | Goa | Bhausaheb Bandodkar Ground, Panaji | | 1986/87 |
| 27 | Barun Burman | Bengal | Tripura | Eden Gardens, Calcutta | | 1986/87 |
| 28 | Sourajit Mohapatra | Orissa | Tripura | Barabati Stadium, Cuttack | | 1987/88 |
| 29 | Shankar Saini | Delhi | Himachal Pradesh | Feroz Shah Kotla, Delhi | | 1988/89 |
| 30 | Salil Ankola | Maharashtra | Gujarat | Nehru Stadium, Pune | | 1988/89 |
| 31 | Javagal Srinath | Karnataka | Hyderabad | Gymkhana Ground, Secunderabad | Ehtesham Ali Khan; M. V. Ramanamurthy; Rajesh Yadav | 1989/90 |
| 32 | Arun Singla | Haryana | Services | Nehru Stadium, Gurgaon | | 1989/90 |
| 33 | Saradindu Mukherjee | Bengal | Hyderabad | Gymkhana Ground, Secunderabad | | 1989/90 |
| 34 | V. Venkatram | Bihar | Tripura | Keenan Stadium, Jamshedpur | | 1990/91 |
| 35 | R. P. Singh | Uttar Pradesh | Vidarbha | Modi Stadium, Kanpur | | 1991/92 |
| 36 | Anil Kumble | Karnataka | Andhra | Ukku Stadium, Visakhapatnam | Varadarajan Vijayasaradhi; Vincent Vinay Kumar; Rajagopalan Vivekanand | 1991/92 |
| 37 | Sunil Subramaniam | Tamil Nadu | Kerala | Public Stadium, Thiruvalla | | 1992/93 |
| 38 | Pritam Gandhe | Vidarbha | Rajasthan | Indira Gandhi Stadium, Alwar | | 1993/94 |
| 39 | Arshad Ayub | Hyderabad | Kerala | Nehru Stadium, Kottayam | | 1993/94 |
| 40 | Sagarmoy Sensharma | Bengal | Delhi | Eden Gardens, Calcutta | | 1993/94 |
| 41 | M. Suresh Kumar | Railways | Rajasthan | Karnail Singh Stadium, Delhi | | 1995/96 |
| 42 | Murali Kartik | Railways | Vidarbha | Karnail Singh Stadium, Delhi | Yogesh Gandhe; Abhay Kale; Trevor Gonsalves | 1996/97 |
| 43 | Anil Kumble | Karnataka | Orissa | Ispat Stadium, Rourkela | Robin Morris; Gautam Gopal; Subash Mohanty | 1997/98 |
| 44 | Anand Katti | Karnataka | Kerala | Thalassery Stadium, Thalassery | K. N. Ananthapadmanabhan; B. Ramprakash; Koragappa Chandrashekara | 1998/99 |
| 45 | Damodaran Devanand | Tamil Nadu | Orissa | MA Chidambaram Stadium, Chennai | Gautam Gopal; Sanjay Satpathy; Shahid Khan | 1998/99 |
| 46 | Amit Mishra | Haryana | Himachal Pradesh | Maharaja Aggarsain Stadium, Rohtak | Virender Sharma; Amit Sharma; Chetan Kumar | 2001/02 |
| 47 | Ajay Barik | Orissa | Assam | Permit Ground, Balasore | Bachan Singh; D. J. Gokulakrishnan; Sukhvinder Singh | 2001/02 |
| 48 | Gagandeep Singh | Punjab | Uttar Pradesh | Punjab Cricket Association Stadium, Mohali | Nikhil Chopra; Javed Anwar; Mritunjay Tripathi | 2002/03 |
| 49 | R Ramkumar | Tamil Nadu | Karnataka | Indian Air Force Ground, Bangalore | Dodda Ganesh; Venkatesh Prasad; Udit Patel | 2003/04 |
| 50 | S. Sreesanth | Kerala | Himachal Pradesh | Fort Maidan, Palakkad | Manvinder Bisla; Ajay Mannu; Paras Dogra | 2004/05 |
| 51 | Rajesh Pawar | Baroda | Hyderabad | Gymkhana Ground, Secunderabad | Ibrahim Khaleel; Narinder Singh; Venkatapathy Raju | 2004/05 |
| 52 | Rakesh Patel | Baroda | Tamil Nadu | Moti Bagh Stadium, Vadodara | Dinesh Karthik; Mumbai Shrinivas; Ramakrishnan Ramkumar | 2004/05 |
| 53 | Joginder Sharma | Haryana | Andhra | Chaudhary Bansi Lal Cricket Stadium, Rohtak | Chandramouli Prasad; Doddapaneni Kalyankrishna; Lakshman Kishore | 2006/07 |
| 54 | Sony Cheruvathur | Kerala | Gujarat | Lalabhai Contractor Stadium, Surat | Amit Singh; Siddharth Trivedi; Hitesh Majmudar | 2007/08 |
| 55 | Parvinder Awana | Delhi | Maharashtra | Indian Petrochemicals Corporation Limited Ground, Nagothane | Vishal Bhilare; Kedar Jadhav; Sairaj Bahutule | 2007/08 |
| 56 | V. R. V. Singh | Punjab | Orissa | Punjab Cricket Association Stadium, Mohali | Rashmi Parida; Rashmi Das; Sourabha Sehgal | 2007/08 |
| 57 | Vinay Kumar | Karnataka | Maharashtra | Chatrapati Shivaji Stadium, Ratnagiri | Ankit Bawne; Ajinkya Joshi; Ameya Shrikhande | 2007/08 |
| 58 | Pritam Gandhe | Vidarbha | Services | Palam A Ground, Delhi | Amiya Mohanty; Shuvra Karmakar; Pankaj Kumar | 2008/09 |
| 59 | Salim Veragi | Baroda | Tamil Nadu | Moti Bagh Stadium, Vadodara | Chinnaswamy Suresh; Lakshmipathy Balaji; Palani Amarnath | 2008/09 |
| 60 | Abhimanyu Mithun | Karnataka | Uttar Pradesh | Bhamashah Stadium, Meerut | Piyush Chawla; Amir Khan; R. P. Singh | 2009/10 |
| 61 | Samad Fallah | Maharashtra | Baroda | Pune Club Ground, Pune | Bhargav Bhatt; Munaf Patel; Yusuf Pathan | 2009/10 |
| 62 | Dhruv Singh | Haryana | Uttar Pradesh | Mohan Meakins Cricket Stadium, Mohan Nagar | Shivakant Shukla; Parvinder Singh; Ashish Yadav | 2010/11 |
| 63 | Pawan Suyal | Delhi | Assam | Roshanara Club Ground, Delhi | Dhiraj Goswami; Arlen Konwar; Ranjeet Mali | 2010/11 |
| 64 | Abu Ahmed | Assam | Goa | Nehru Stadium, Guwahati | Sher Yadav; Sathiamoorty Saravanan; Rahul Keni | 2011/12 |
| 65 | Siddharth Trivedi | Saurashtra | Punjab | Punjab Cricket Association Stadium, Mohali | Karan Goel; Harbhajan Singh; Manpreet Gony | 2011/12 |
| 66 | Krishnakant Upadhyay | Railways | Punjab | Punjab Cricket Association Stadium, Mohali | Uday Kaul; Taruwar Kohli; Manpreet Gony | 2011/12 |
| 67 | Mohammed Shami | Bengal | Madhya Pradesh | Holkar Stadium, Indore | Anand Rajan; Amarjeet Singh; Ishwar Pandey | 2012/13 |
| 68 | Rakesh Dhruve | Gujarat | Vidarbha | Vidarbha Cricket Association Ground, Nagpur | Shrikant Wagh; Umesh Yadav; Sandeep Singh | 2013/14 |
| 69 | Sreenath Aravind | Karnataka | Tamil Nadu | M Chinnaswamy Stadium, Bangalore | Malolan Rangarajan; Lakshmipathy Balaji; M. Mohammed | 2014/15 |
| 70 | Mohit Sharma | Haryana | Delhi | Chaudhary Bansi Lal Cricket Stadium, Rohtak | Virender Sehwag; Parvinder Awana; Navdeep Saini | 2014/15 |
| 71 | H. S. Sharath | Karnataka | Haryana | Srikantadatta Narasimha Raja Wadeyar Ground, Mysore | Sachin Rana; Rahul Dagar; Nitin Saini | 2015/16 |
| 72 | Basant Mohanty | Orissa | Delhi | KIIT Stadium, Bhubaneswar | Puneet Bisht; Suboth Bhati; Pulkit Narang | 2015/16 |
| 73 | Umesh Yadav | Vidarbha | Rajasthan | Vidarbha Cricket Association Ground, Nagpur | Kukna Ajay Singh; Aniket Choudhary; Nathu Singh | 2015/16 |
| 74 | Rana Dutta | Tripura | Himachal Pradesh | Bengal Cricket Academy Ground, Kalyani | Rishi Dhawan; Sumeet Verma; Mayank Dagar | 2016/17 |
| 75 | Vinay Kumar | Karnataka | Mumbai | Vidarbha Cricket Association Stadium, Nagpur | Prithvi Shaw; Jay Bista; Akash Parkar | 2017/18 |
| 76 | Rajneesh Gurbani | Vidarbha | Delhi | Holkar Stadium, Indore | Vikas Mishra; Navdeep Saini; Dhruv Shorey | 2017/18 |
| 77 | Mohammed Mudhasir | Jammu and Kashmir | Rajasthan | Sawai Mansingh Stadium, Jaipur | Chetan Bht; Tajinder Singh; Deepak Chahar; Tanveer Ul-Haq | 2018/19 |
| 78 | Shahbaz Ahmed | Bengal | Hyderabad | Bengal Cricket Academy Ground, Kalyani | Jaweed Ali; Ravi Kiran; Kolla Sumanth | 2019/20 |
| 79 | Ravi Yadav | Madhya Pradesh | Uttar Pradesh | Holkar Stadium, Indore | Aryan Juyal; Ankit Rajpoot; Sameer Rizvi | 2019/20 |
| 80 | Royston Dias | Mumbai | Bihar | Moin-ul-Haq Stadium, Patna | Ashutosh Aman; Himanshu Singh; Veer Pratap Singh | 2023/24 |
| 81 | Kulwant Khejroliya | Madhya Pradesh | Baroda | Holkar Stadium, Indore | Shashwat Rawat; Mahesh Pithiya; Bhargav Bhatt; Akash Singh | 2023/24 |
| 82 | Rishi Dhawan | Himachal Pradesh | Pondicherry | Himachal Pradesh Cricket Association Stadium, Dharamsala | Saurabh Yadav; Gaurav Yadav; Ajay Rohera | 2024/25 |
| 83 | Shardul Thakur | Mumbai | Meghalaya | Sharad Pawar Cricket Academy Ground, Mumbai | Balchander Anirudh; Sumit Kumar; Jaskirat Singh | 2024/25 |
| 84 | Arjun Sharma | Services | Assam | Tinsukia District Sports Association Ground, Tinsukia | Riyan Parag; Sumit Ghadigaonkar; Sibsankar Roy | 2025/26 |
| 85 | Mohit Jangra | Services | Assam | Tinsukia District Sports Association Ground, Tinsukia | Pradyun Saikia; Mukhtar Hussain; Bhargab Lahkar | 2025/26 |

== Hat-tricks by team ==
| Team | Number of Hat-tricks |
|---|---|
| Karnataka | 10 |
| Bengal | 6 |
| Delhi | 5 |
| Haryana | 5 |
| Tamil Nadu | 5 |
| Services | 4 |
| Vidarbha | 4 |
| Baroda | 3 |
| Mumbai | 3 |
| Maharashtra | 3 |
| Odisha | 3 |
| Railways | 3 |
| Uttar Pradesh | 3 |
| Bihar | 2 |
| Kerala | 2 |
| Punjab | 2 |
| Saurashtra | 2 |
| Assam | 1 |
| Gujarat | 1 |
| Holkar | 1 |
| Hyderabad | 1 |
| Kathiawar | 1 |
| Madhya Pradesh | 1 |
| Nawanagar | 1 |
| Northern India | 1 |
| Rajasthan | 1 |
| Southern Punjab | 1 |
| Tripura | 1 |
| Jammu and Kashmir | 1 |

== See also ==
- Ranji Trophy
- List of Ranji Trophy records
