= List of Baroda cricketers =

This is a list of all cricketers who have played first-class, list A or Twenty20 cricket for Baroda cricket team. Seasons given are first and last seasons; the player did not necessarily play in all the intervening seasons. Players in bold have played international cricket.

Last updated at the end of the 2015/16 season.

== A ==
- **Hemu Adhikari**, 1937/38-1949/50
- Bharat Adiecha, 1988/89-1989/90
- **Mohinder Amarnath**, 1984/85
- **Surinder Amarnath**, 1983/84
- Srinivas Ambegaokar, 1937/38-1939/40
- Khagesh Amin, 1990/91-1992/93
- Ajitesh Argal, 2008/09-2015/16
- Rishi Arothe, 2013/14-2015/16
- Tushar Arothe, 1985/86-2003/04
- Hakumatrai Asha, 1944/45

== B ==
- Imtiaz Babi, 1980/81
- Rajendra Babla, 1976/77-1978/79
- Hitshu Bachani, 2001/02-2002/03
- Bobby Badola, 1997/98-1998/99
- Dilip Bagwe, 1957/58
- Jairaj Barot, 1970/71-1978/79
- **Atul Bedade**, 1988/89-2002/03
- Gordon Belsher, 1994/95
- Firdaush Bhaja, 2009/10-2013/14
- Ashit Bhansali, 1982/83-1983/84
- Bhargav Bhatt, 2009/10-2015/16
- Raju Bhatt, 1961/62-1966/67
- Ajit Bhoite, 1996/97-2006/07
- Viraj Bhosale, 2016/17-present
- Vijay Bhosle, 1957/58-1958/59
- Azhar Bilakhia, 2007/08-2009/10
- M. V. Bobjee, 1941/42
- **Chandu Borde**, 1954/55-1962/63
- Ahmed Botawala, 1937/38
- Bhupinder Brar, 1996/97
- Valmik Buch, 1993/94-2003/04

== C ==
- Paul Carey, 1942/43
- Rohit Chandurkar, 2002/03-2003/04
- Pratyush Chatterji, 2011/12
- Abhimanyu Chauhan, 2005/06-2015/16
- Indravijaysinh Chauhan, 1973/74-1975/76
- Arjun Chavada, 1996/97-1999/00
- Deepak Chavan, 1988/89-1990/91
- Kedar Chavan, 1986/87-1996/97
- Jyot Chhaya, 2010/11-2013/14
- Sanjeev Choksi, 1988/89-1991/92
- Prabhakar Cholkar, 1967/68-1976/77
- M. S. Chumble, 1949/50

== D ==
- Jayant Dandekar, 1965/66
- Prayan Dave, 1993/94-1998/99
- Harkant Desai, 1938/39
- Himanshu Desai, 1963/64-1967/68
- Shantu Desai, 1938/39
- Ravi Deshmukh, 1973/74-1985/86
- Sharad Deshmukh, 1966/67
- Kedar Devdhar, 2007/08-2015/16
- Mrunal Devdhar, 2015/16
- Viresh Dhaiber, 1981/82
- Jagdevrao Dhumal, 1939/40
- Dinshaw Doctor, 1941/42
- Sunil Doshi, 1990/91-1993/94
- Shaukat Dudha, 1967/68-1980/81
- **Shaukat Dukanwala**, 1980/81-1990/91 (played international cricket for United Arab Emirates)

== E ==
- **Amir Elahi**, 1943/44-1949/50 (played international cricket for India and Pakistan)

== F ==
- Shrikant Fadnis, 1964/65-1970/71
- Tony Fernandes, 1962/63-1973/74
- Leslie Fernandes, 1966/67-1978/79

== G ==
- **Anshuman Gaekwad**, 1969/70-1991/92
- Chandrasen Gaekwad, 1947/48-1952/53
- **Datta Gaekwad**, 1947/48-1963/64
- Maharaja of Baroda Fatehsinghrao Gaekwad, 1946/47-1957/58
- Ranjitsinh Gaekwad, 1958/59-1967/68
- Samarjeet Gaekwad, 1987/88-1988/89
- Sangramsinh Gaekwad, 1960/61-1975/76
- Shatrunjay Gaekwad, 2003/04-2013/14
- Vinaysinh Gaekwad, 1949/50-1957/58
- Khaderao Gaekwar, 1937/38-1942/43
- Edulji Gai, 1939/40-1941/42
- Chandrakant Gamit, 1972/73
- Ramesh Gandhi, 1972/73
- Vasantrao Ghatge, 1957/58-1961/62
- Pratik Ghodadra, 2014/15
- **Jayasinghrao Ghorpade**, 1948/49-1965/66
- Jayendrasinh Ghorpade, 1954/55-1976/77
- Wyankatrao Ghorpade, 1937/38-1943/44
- Anupam Gupta, 2009/10-2012/13
- A. G. Gupte, 1937/38-1939/40
- S. G. Gupte, 1943/44
- Vikas Gupte, 1973/74
- Prakash Gurubaxani, 2002/03

== H ==
- Saiyed Hamid Ali, 1998/99-2007/08
- Kunal Hazare, 1997/98
- Ranjit Hazare, 1966/67-1983/84
- Sanjay Hazare, 1981/82-1997/98
- **Vijay Hazare**, 1941/42-1960/61
- Vikram Hazare, 1970/71-1978/79
- Vivek Hazare, 1942/43-1963/64
- Deepak Hooda, 2012/13-2015/16

== I ==
- Hemant Indulkar, 1995/96-1999/00
- Mahipatrao Indulkar, 1940/41-1943/44
- Vijay Indulkar, 1961/62-1965/66

== J ==
- Himanshu Jadhav, 1992/93-2006/07
- Mahesh Jadhav, 1964/65-1966/67
- Madavsinh Jagdale, 1939/40
- Chandrasekhar Joshi, 1951/52-1955/56
- Shekhar Joshi, 2000/01-2006/07
- Vimal Joshi, 2003/04-2004/05
- Shashank Junnarkar, 1992/93

== K ==
- Chandrakant Kadam, 1959/60
- Muenoddin Kadri, 1996/97-1999/00
- Harish Kahar, 1981/82-1989/90
- Santosh Kahar, 1988/89
- Sudeep Kale, 2001/02
- Abhijit Karambelkar, 2008/09-2015/16
- Kamraj Kesari, 1941/42
- Suresh Keshwala, 1984/85
- Ashok Khaire, 1969/70
- A. G. Khan, 1937/38
- **Zaheer Khan**, 1999/00-2005/06
- **Gogumal Kishenchand**, 1952/53-1969/70
- Jaykishan Kolsawala, 2010/11
- Sudhir Kulkarni, 1973/74-1982/83
- Vinod Kunjaravia, 1980/81-1981/82
- VINAY KAHAR , 1994-2005

== L ==
- Anil Limaye, 1963/64-1967/68
- Madhav Limaye, 1953/54-1960/61

== M ==
- Dharmsinh Mahida, 1965/66-1968/69
- Vinoo Majithia, 1963/64
- Sagar Mangalorkar, 2014/15-2015/16
- Ilyas Manjare, 1972/73
- Jagdeep Mankad, 1971/72
- **Jacob Martin**, 1991/92-2009/10
- Dishant Mehta, 2006/07
- Raju Mehta, 1977/78-1979/80
- Lukman Meriwala, 2012/13-2014/15
- Milip Mewada, 1996/97-2004/05
- Dhiren Mistry, 2012/13-2014/15
- **Gul Mohammad**, 1943/44-1950/51 (played international cricket for India and Pakistan)
- Aditya Mohite, 1997/98
- Chandrasekhar Mohite, 1972/73-1981/82
- Harshad Mohite, 1998/99
- Nikunj Mohite, 2006/07-2008/09
- **Nayan Mongia**, 1988/89-2004/05
- B. B. More, 1937/38
- **Kiran More**, 1980/81-1997/98
- Pradeep More, 1969/70
- Darshan Mulherkar, 1997/98-2000/01

== N ==
- Mutyalswami Naidu, 1939/40-1947/48
- Jasmin Naik, 1986/87-1988/89
- Rajiv Naik, 1990/91-1995/96
- Mukesh Narula, 1985/86-1996/97
- Nazeem Nathani, 1972/73-1973/74
- **C. S. Nayudu**, 1939/40-1943/44
- B. B. Nimbalkar, 1939/40
- R. B. Nimbalkar, 1937/38-1952/53

== P ==
- Abhay Palkar, 1987/88-1992/93
- Ketan Panchal, 2005/06-2015/16
- Bipin Panchasara, 1979/80-1984/85
- Vinayak Pandit, 1939/40-1943/44
- **Hardik Pandya**, 2012/13-2015/16
- Hemant Pandya, 1983/84-1984/85
- Krunal Pandya, 2012/13-2014/15
- Rishikesh Parab, 2001/02-2006/07
- Siddharth Parab, 1997/98
- Satyajit Parab, 1997/98-2009/10
- Madhav Paranjpe, 1943/44
- Vasudev Paranjpe, 1956/57
- Dashrat Pardeshi, 1978/79-1990/91
- Rakesh Parikh, 1983/84-1995/96
- Snehal Parikh, 1981/82-1985/86
- Chandrabhan Parmar, 1937/38
- Hardik Parmar, 2001/02-2009/10
- Kishansinh Parmar, 1956/57-1958/59
- Madansinh Parmar, 1956/57-1959/60
- Vishwanath Parmar, 2005/06-2013/14
- Ahmed Patel, 1940/41-1951/52
- Alpesh Patel, 2006/07
- Atul Patel, 1966/67-1968/69
- Chimanbhai Patel, 1952/53-1966/67
- Dixit Patel, 2014/15-2015/16
- Girishbhai Patel, 1975/76-1976/77
- Jayantibhai Patel, 1953/54-1954/55
- **Jitendra Patel**, 1964/65-1965/66 (played international cricket for Canada)
- Ketul Patel, 2012/13-2013/14
- Lalubhai Patel, 1973/74
- Mahesh Patel, 1969/70-1970/71
- Mayur Patel, 1980/81-1987/88
- Monil Patel, 2011/12
- **Munaf Patel**, 2008/09-2015/16
- Pragnesh Patel, 2004/05-2007/08
- Rakesh Patel, 1999/00-2010/11
- Ramchandra Patel, 1954/55-1961/62
- **Rashid Patel**, 1986/87-1996/97
- Rohit Patel, 1967/68-1974/75
- Sanjay Patel, 1991/92-1996/97
- Umang Patel, 2000/01-2002/03
- Upendra Patel, 1964/65
- Utkarsh Patel, 2008/09-2013/14
- Vasudev Patel, 1979/80-1985/86
- Babashafi Pathan, 2013/14
- **Irfan Pathan**, 2000/01-2015/16
- Irfan Pathan, 1999/00-2008/09
- **Yusuf Pathan**, 2001/02-2015/16
- Sharad Patkar, 1949/50
- Sangramsinh Pawar, 1992/93
- Rajesh Pawar, 2003/04-2009/10
- Amar Petiwale, 1981/82-1989/90
- Kiran Powar, 2004/05-2006/07
- Rambhau Powar, 1938/39-1942/43
- Shankarrao Powar, 1937/38-1950/51
- Rajaram Pradhan, 1938/39
- Ramesh Pradhan, 1945/46-1951/52

== R ==
- Vasant Raiji, 1944/45-1949/50
- Tilak Raj, 1984/85-1987/88
- **Ambati Rayudu**, 2010/11-2015/16
- Adityananda Reddy, 2008/09-2012/13
- Suresh Ringe, 1974/75-1976/77

== S ==
- Hazaratali Saiyad, 1959/60-1968/69
- Dhiran Salvi, 2002/03-2005/06
- Rohan Salvi, 2001/02
- Dinkar Sankpal, 1969/70-1972/73
- Narayan Satham, 1967/68-1984/85
- Nanashed Savant, 1960/61-1961/62
- Sanjiv Sawant, 1985/86-1990/91
- Miten Shah, 2010/11
- Pinal Shah, 2004/05-2015/16
- Kamran Shaikh, 2008/09-2013/14
- Mehndi Shaikh, 1968/69-1980/81
- Anwar Sheikh, 1992/93
- Kedar Sheikh, 1949/50
- Yacoob Sheikh, 1937/38-1950/51
- Zubeer Sheikh, 2006/07
- Atit Sheth, 2014/15-2015/16
- **Sadu Shinde**, 1947/48-1948/49
- **Deepak Shodhan**, 1957/58-1959/60
- Irshad Sindhi, 2005/06-2010/11
- Gagandeep Singh, 2010/11-2015/16
- Sukhbir Singh, 1993/94-2002/03
- Sunit Singh, 2005/06-2012/13
- Smitkumar Patel, 2008/09-2012/13
- Swapnil Singh, 2005/06-2015/16
- **Laxman Sivaramakrishnan**, 1998/99
- **Ranga Sohoni**, 1948/49
- Hitesh Solanki, 2015/16
- Rakesh Solanki, 2002/03-2013/14
- Shailesh Solanki, 2006/07-2009/10
- Vishnu Solanki, 2012/13-2014/15
- Ashok Sonalkar, 1964/65-1969/70
- Dinesh Soni, 1992/93
- Sukhdevsinhji, 1953/54
- R. A. Swaroop, 1995/96-2000/01

== T ==
- Soaeb Tai, 2015/16
- Arun Tambe, 1957/58
- Ashish Tandon, 1995/96-1998/99
- Uday Tate, 1967/68-1968/69
- D. Thorat, 2000/01

== V ==
- Murtuja Vahora, 2005/06-2015/16
- Salim Veragi, 2007/08-2012/13
- Shyamrao Vichare, 1943/44-1960/61
- Jyotirvadan Vin, 1953/54-1963/64
- Trivikram Vinod, 1940/41-1943/44
- Sankalp Vora, 2004/05-2012/13
- Vijay Vyas, 1983/84

== W ==
- Vinit Wadkar, 1978/79-1988/89
- Aditya Waghmode, 2010/11-2015/16
- Saurabh Wakaskar, 2011/12-2014/15
- Yogendra Wakaskar, 1997/98-2000/01
- Cecil Williams, 1961/62-1977/78
- Connor Williams, 1995/96-2010/11

== Y ==
- D. K. Yarde, 1937/38
- J. J. Yelwande, 1937/38-1938/39

== Z ==
- Ikram Zampawala, 2008/09
- Indravadan Zaveri, 1951/52-1952/53
