= List of Tamil Nadu first-class cricket records =

This is a list of Tamil Nadu first-class cricket records, with each list containing the top five performances in the category.

Currently active players are bolded.

== Team records ==
=== Highest innings totals ===
Rank	Score	Opponent	Season
1	912/6 dec	Goa	1988/89
2	785	Hyderabad	2009/10
3	709	Railways	1987/88
4	698/8 dec	Gujarat	2011/12
5	695/5 dec	Uttar Pradesh	2013/14
Source: CricketArchive. Last updated: 20 October 2016.

=== Lowest innings totals ===
Rank	Score	Opponent	Season
1	56	Ceylon Cricket Association	1956/57
2	61	Bombay	1972/73
3	68	Punjab	2015/16
4	69	Baroda	1949/50
5	69	Punjab	2015/16
Source: CricketArchive. Last updated: 20 October 2016.

=== Largest margin of runs victory ===
Rank	Margin	Opponent	Season
1	inns & 280 runs	Goa	1991/92
2	inns & 238 runs	Uttar Pradesh	2008/09
3	inns & 197 runs	Goa	1999/00
4	inns & 195 runs	Kerala	1983/84
5	inns & 166 runs	Andhra	1991/92
Source: CricketArchive. Last updated: 20 October 2016.

=== Largest margin of runs victory ===
Rank	Margin	Opponent	Season
1	379 runs	Mysore	1936/37
2	316 runs	Travancore-Cochin	1953/54
3	279 runs	Madhya Pradesh	1967/68
4	277 runs	Jammu and Kashmir	2014/15
5	269 runs	Assam	2003/04
Source: CricketArchive. Last updated: 20 October 2016.

== Batting records ==
=== Highest individual scores ===
Rank	Score	Player	Opponent	Season
1	313	Woorkeri Raman	Goa	1988/89
2	302*	Arjan Kripal Singh	Goa	1988/89
3	300	**Abhinav Mukund**	Maharashtra	2008/09
4	288	Sridharan Sriram	Uttar Pradesh	1999/00
5	267	Sridharan Sriram	Bengal	2002/03
Source: CricketArchive. Last updated: 20 October 2016.

== Bowling records ==
=== Best innings bowling ===
Rank	Score	Player	Opponent	Season
1	9/50	KS Kannan	Hyderabad	1947/48
2	9/54	T. A. Sekhar	Kerala	1982/83
3	9/76	Vaman Kumar	Kerala	1969/70
4	8/37	Vikram Thambuswamy	Andhra	1967/68
5	8/40	Sunil Valson	Andhra	1981/82
Source: CricketArchive. Last updated: 20 October 2016.

=== Best match bowling ===
Rank	Score	Player	Opponent	Season
1	14/118	Sunil Subramaniam	Assam	1992/93
2	14/152	V. V. Kumar	Kerala	1969/70
3	14/194	A. G. Ram Singh	Bengal	1943/44
4	13/73	M. J. Gopalan	Ceylon	1932/33
5	13/96	T. A. Sekhar	Kerala	1982/83
Source: CricketArchive. Last updated: 20 October 2016.

=== Hat-Trick ===
Rank	Player	Opponent	Season
1	M. J. Gopalan	Ceylon	1932/33
2	Gopalaswami Parthasarathy	Southern India (not in Ranji Trophy)	1936/37
3	B. Kalyanasundaram	Bombay	1972/73
4	Bharat Arun	Goa	1986/87
5	Sunil Subramaniam	Kerala	1992/93
6	Damodaran Devanand	Orissa	1998/99
7	Ramakrishnan Ramkumar	Karnataka	2003/04
Source: CricketArchive. Last updated: 20 October 2016.

== Notes ==
All lists are referenced to CricketArchive.

== See also ==
- Tamil Nadu cricket team
- List of Tamil Nadu List A cricket records
