= 1941–42 Ranji Trophy =

Indian cricket tournament

- The Ranji Trophy
- Administrator: BCCI
- Cricket format: First-class
- Tournament format: Knockout
- Champions: Bombay (3rd title)
- Participants: 18
- Matches: 17
- Most runs: K.C. Ibrahim (Bombay) (469)
- Most wickets: B. K. Garudachar (Mysore) (34)

The 1941–42 Ranji Trophy was the eighth season of the Ranji Trophy. Bombay regained the title after six years defeating Mysore.

== Highlights ==
- A. G. Ram Singh took his 100th Ranji wicket in the match between Madras and Hyderabad and completed 1,000 runs in the next match between Madras and United Provinces. He was the second player to complete this double in Ranji Trophy after Amar Singh in 1939–40
- Northern India defeated North West Frontier Province by an innings and 405 runs. It was the biggest margin of win in Ranji Trophy at the time. The present record is innings and 472 runs by Assam v Tripura in 1991/92.
- In their first innings of the season, the defending champion Maharashtra was bowled out for 39 by Nawanagar with Shute Banerjee taking 8 wickets for 25 runs.
- Future Test cricketer Putu Chowdhury took 11 wickets on his first class debut, for Bihar v Bengal. Bihar lost the match on a first innings deficit of 1 run.
- Madhav Mantri, making his debut as wicket-keeper for Bombay in semifinal, claimed 9 wickets, including five stumpings.

== Zonal Matches ==
=== West Zone ===
Round 1
15 Nov 1941 – Jamnagar
Nawanagar | 159 & 73/2
Maharashtra | 39 & 189
8 Nov 1941 – Bombay
Bombay | 462
Western India | 95 & 167
8 Nov 1941 – Baroda
Baroda | 312 & 257/6d
Gujarat | 150 & 23/2

Round 2
29 Nov 1941 – Jamnagar
Nawanagar | 284 & 48/2
Bombay | 462/8d
6 Dec 1941 – Karachi
Sind | 237 & 68/2
Baroda | 178 & 126

Round 3
29 Dec 1941 – Bombay
Bombay | 405
Sind | 326

=== East Zone ===
Round 1
8 Nov 1941 – Indore
Holkar | 246 & 169/3
United Provinces | 307 & 192
7 Dec 1941— Jamshedpur
Bihar | 262 & 37/1
Bengal | 263 & 294

Round 2
10 Jan 1942 – Benaras
United Provinces | 426
Bengal | 473

=== South Zone ===
Round 1
29 Nov 1941 – Bangalore
Mysore | 199 & 352
Hyderabad | 169 & 271
29 Nov 1941 – Nagpur
Central Provinces and Berar | 192 & 128
Madras | 217 & 104/6

Round 2
31 Dec 1941 – Bangalore
Mysore | 147 & 246
Madras | 154 & 217

=== North Zone ===
Round 1
6 Dec 1941 – Lahore
Northern India | 613/7d
North West Frontier Province | 90 & 118

Round 2
27 Dec 1941 – Lahore
Northern India | 285 & 128
Southern Punjab | 158 & 181

== Inter-Zonal Knockout Stage ==
Semi-finals
13 Feb 1942 - Lahore
Northern India | 211 & 225
Bombay | 257 & 184/3
31 Jan 1942 – Calcutta
Bengal | 279 & 219
Mysore | 307 & 208

Final
7 Mar 1942 – Bombay
Bombay | 506/9d
Mysore | 68 & 157

=== 1st Semi-final ===
31 January – 3 February 1942
1st Semi-final
Scorecard

| Mysore | v | Bengal (H) |
| 307 (101.2 overs); CJ Ramdev 105*; S Ramachandra 7/52 (20.2 overs) | | 279 (78.4 overs); S Ramachandra 97*; Ranga Iyengar 4/39 (13.4 overs) |
| 208 (69.4 overs); CJ Ramdev 57; Devraj Puri 4/71 (19 overs) | | 219 (75 overs); K Bhattacharjee 65; BK Garudachar 5/68 (25 overs) |

Mysore won by 17 runs
Eden Gardens, Calcutta

=== 2nd Semi-final ===
13–16 February 1942
Scorecard

| Northern India (H) | v | Bombay |
| 211 (68.4 overs); Ramprakash Mehra 93; Keki Tarapore 3/46 (18.4 overs) | | 257 (95.5 overs); Jehangir Khot 95; Jahangir Khan 5/50 (28 overs) |
| 225 (88.2 overs); Nazar Mohammad 38; Keki Tarapore 5/85 (34 overs) | | 184/3 (76 overs); KC Ibrahim 69*; Jahangir Khan 1/30 (24 overs) |

Bombay won by 7 wickets
Bagh-e-Jinnah, Lahore

=== Final ===
7–9 Mar 1942
Scorecard

| Mysore | v | Bombay (H) |
| 68 (46.2 overs); CJ Ramdev 28; Jehangir Khot 6/19 (19 overs) | | 506/9d (145 overs); KC Ibrahim 117; BK Garudachar 3/161 (49 overs) |
| 157 (61.4 overs); Benjamin Frank 61; Jehangir Khot 5/40 (19 overs) |

Bombay won by an innings and 281 runs
Brabourne Stadium, Bombay
Umpires: MG Bhave and T. A. Ramachandran

- Mysore won the toss and elected to bat.
- GM Rajasekhar (Mysore) made his first-class debut.

== Scorecards and averages ==
- CricketArchive
