= Keki =

Keki is a Hindic given name that may refer to

- Keki Abdi Pasha (died April 1789), Ottoman statesman
- Keki Adhikari, Nepalese actress and model
- Keki Byramjee Grant (1920–2011), Indian cardiologist
- Keki N. Daruwalla (born 1937), Indian poet and short story writer
- Keki Hormusji Gharda (born 1929), Indian chemical engineer and entrepreneur
- Keki Mistry, Indian chief executive
- Keki Tarapore (1910–1986), Indian cricketer
- Keki Tarapore (coach) (1922–2001), Indian cricketer and coach

== See also ==
- KeKi, a Finnish ice hockey club
