= List of Tamil Nadu Twenty20 cricket records =

Twenty20 cricket records for Indian state of Tamil Nadu

This is a List of Tamil Nadu Twenty20 cricket records, with each list containing the top five performances in the category.

Currently active players are bolded.

== Team records ==
=== Highest innings totals ===
Rank	Score	Opponent	Season
1	213/2	Meghalaya	2018/19
2	205/7	Karnataka	2010/11
3	193/7	Hyderabad	2017/18
4	190/3	Andhra	2010/11
5	189/5	Goa	2011/12
Source: ESPNcricinfo. Last updated: 18 April 2020.

=== Lowest innings totals ===
Rank	Score	Opponent	Season
1	59	Bengal	2010/11
2	61	Karnataka	2014/15
3	87	Karnataka	2013/14
4	93	Hyderabad	2016/17
5	101/8	Andhra	2014/15
Source: ESPNcricinfo. Last updated: 17 September 2018.

=== Largest margin of runs victory ===
Rank	Margin	Opponent	Season
1	113 runs	Vidarbha	2019/20
2	92 runs	Meghalaya	2018/19
3	84 runs	Andhra	2011/12
4	69 runs	Bengal	2015/16
5	65 runs	Karnataka	2010/11
Source: ESPNcricinfo. Last updated: 18 April 2020.

== Batting records ==
=== Most Career Runs ===
Rank	Runs	Player	Matches	Innings	Period
1.	1507	Dinesh Karthik	66	57	2007-2021
2.	1136	Baba Aparajith	59	50	2013-2022
3.	1070	Anirudha Srikkanth	45	44	2007-2019
4.	991	Narayan Jagadeesan	44	42	2017-2022
4.	938	Murali Vijay	35	32	2007-2019
Source: ESPNcricinfo. Last updated: 20 October 2022.

=== Highest individual scores ===
Rank	Score	Player	Opponent	Season
1	107	**Murali Vijay**	Meghalaya	2019/20
2	92*	**Hari Nishanth**	Jharkhand	2020/21
3	90*	**Dinesh Karthik**	Andhra	2010/11
4	89*	**Arun Karthik**	Rajasthan	2020/21
5	87*	Vasudevan Devendran	Goa	2006/07
5	87	**Murali Vijay**	Kerala	2013/14
Source: ESPNcricinfo. Last updated: 21 November 2021.

== Bowling records ==
=== Most Wickets ===
Rank	Wickets	Player	Average	Economy	Period
1	55	Murugan Ashwin	21.05	6.75	2016-2022
2	51	Sai Kishore	16.52	5.27	2018-2022
3	34	Rahil Shah	22.88	7.23	2011-2018
4	33	Chandrasekar Ganapathy	15.69	6.34	2007-2012
5	31	Yo Mahesh	21.90	6.97	2007-2014
Source: ESPNcricinfo. Last updated: 20 October 2022.

=== Best innings bowling ===
Rank	Score	Player	Opponent	Season
1	5/12	Rahil Shah	Bengal	2015/16
2	5/21	**Saravana Kumar**	Hyderabad	2020/21
3	5/25	**Krishnamoorthy Vignesh**	Kerala	2017/18
4	5/30	V Athisayaraj Davidson	Karnataka	2017/18
5	4/5	Lakshmipathy Balaji	Andhra	2012/13
Source: ESPNcricinfo. Last updated: 21 November 2021.

== Notes ==
All lists are referenced to ESPNcricinfo.

== See also ==
- Tamil Nadu cricket team
- List of Tamil Nadu List A cricket records
- List of Tamil Nadu first-class cricket records
