= 2004–05 Ranji Trophy =

Cricket tournament

- The Ranji Trophy, which the winners get.
- Administrator: BCCI
- Cricket format: First-class cricket
- Tournament format(s): League and knockout
- Champions: Railways (2nd title)
- Participants: 27
- Most runs: Niraj Patel (Gujarat) (735)
- Most wickets: Gagandeep Singh (Punjab) (39)

The 2004–05 Ranji Trophy was the 71st season of the Ranji Trophy. Railways defeated Punjab on first innings lead in the final.

== Knockout stage ==
Semifinals
B1	Hyderabad	166 & 170
A2	Railways	180 & 160/3
A1	Mumbai	251 & 168
B2	Punjab	126 & 294/7

Final
A2	Railways	355 & 471
B2	Punjab	309 & 137/4

Assam v Baroda at Guwahati - Nov 7–10, 2004

Assam 273 and 360/4; Baroda 347 ScorecardMatch drawn Bengal v Karnataka at Kolkata - Nov 7–10, 2004

Bengal 315 and 206; Karnataka 179 and 226 ScorecardBengal won by 116 runs Gujarat v Delhi at Ahmedabad - Nov 7–10, 2004

Gujarat 214 and 372; Delhi 430/8d and 102/9 ScorecardMatch drawn Madhya Pradesh v Andhra at Indore - Nov 7–10, 2004

Andhra 361 and 195/3; Madhya Pradesh 287 ScorecardMatch drawn Punjab v Uttar Pradesh at Mohali - Nov 7–10, 2004

Uttar Pradesh 269 and 317/8d; Punjab 308 and 164/5 ScorecardMatch drawn Railways v Mumbai at Delhi - Nov 7–10, 2004

Mumbai 361 and 221/3; Railways 284 ScorecardMatch drawn Tamil Nadu v Hyderabad (India) at Chennai - Nov 7–10, 2004

Hyderabad (India) 163 and 190; Tamil Nadu 461/6d ScorecardTamil Nadu won by an innings and 108 runs Delhi v Andhra at Delhi - Nov 16–19, 2004

Delhi 491/9d; Andhra 311 and 152/5 (f/o) ScorecardMatch drawn Jammu & Kashmir v Orissa at Srinagar - Nov 16–20, 2004

Orissa 325 and 98/2; Jammu & Kashmir 123 and 299 (f/o) ScorecardOrissa won by 8 wickets Karnataka v Gujarat at Bangalore - Nov 16–19, 2004

Gujarat 330 and 307/4d; Karnataka 272 and 156/7 ScorecardMatch drawn Kerala v Himachal Pradesh at Palakkad - Nov 16–19, 2004

Himachal Pradesh 465 and 187/7d; Kerala 215 and 290/6 ScorecardMatch drawn Maharashtra v Baroda at Pune - Nov 16–19, 2004

Baroda 446 and 189/1; Maharashtra 387 ScorecardMatch drawn Mumbai v Madhya Pradesh at Mumbai - Nov 16–19, 2004

Madhya Pradesh 255 and 222; Mumbai 233 and 81/4 ScorecardMatch drawn Punjab v Assam at Amritsar - Nov 16–19, 2004

Punjab 422; Assam 213 and 158 (f/o) ScorecardPunjab won by an innings and 51 runs Railways v Bengal at Delhi - Nov 16–19, 2004

Railways 348 and 217/6d; Bengal 255 and 212/5 ScorecardMatch drawn Saurashtra v Jharkhand at Rajkot - Nov 16–19, 2004

Saurashtra 274 and 279/6; Jharkhand 358/9d ScorecardMatch drawn Services v Goa at Delhi - Nov 16–19, 2004

Services 507/5d; Goa 244 and 269/4 (f/o) ScorecardMatch drawn Tripura v Haryana at Agartala - Nov 16–19, 2004

Haryana 200 and 437/5; Tripura 288 ScorecardMatch drawn Uttar Pradesh v Tamil Nadu at Lucknow - Nov 16–19, 2004

Tamil Nadu 353; Uttar Pradesh 136 and 157/8 (f/o) ScorecardMatch drawn Vidarbha v Rajasthan at Nagpur - Nov 16–18, 2004

Rajasthan 101 and 151; Vidarbha 157 and 96/3 ScorecardVidarbha won by 7 wickets Bengal v Gujarat at Siliguri - Nov 25–28, 2004

Bengal 298 and 279/6d; Gujarat 361 and 217/8 ScorecardGujarat won by 2 wickets Delhi v Railways at Delhi - Nov 25–28, 2004

Delhi 216 and 395/4; Railways 201 ScorecardMatch drawn Haryana v Goa at Gurgaon - Nov 25–28, 2004

Haryana 293 and 188/6d; Goa 165 and 163 ScorecardHaryana won by 153 runs Himachal Pradesh v Saurashtra at Dharamsala - Nov 25–28, 2004

Saurashtra 268 and 153; Himachal Pradesh 140 and 282/6 ScorecardHimachal Pradesh won by 4 wickets Hyderabad (India) v Maharashtra at Hyderabad - Nov 25–27, 2004

Hyderabad (India) 231 and 170; Maharashtra 83 and 233 ScorecardHyderabad (India) won by 85 runs Jharkhand v Jammu & Kashmir at Jamshedpur - Nov 25–27, 2004

Jammu & Kashmir 79 and 176; Jharkhand 245 and 11/0 ScorecardJharkhand won by 10 wickets Karnataka v Madhya Pradesh at Bangalore - Nov 25–28, 2004

Karnataka 619/5d; Madhya Pradesh 422 and 152/6 (f/o) ScorecardMatch drawn Kerala v Orissa at Palakkad - Nov 25–28, 2004

Kerala 324 and 149/8d; Orissa 334 and 47/3 ScorecardMatch drawn Mumbai v Andhra at Mumbai - Nov 25–28, 2004

Mumbai 515/9d; Andhra 116 and 278 (f/o) ScorecardMumbai won by an innings and 121 runs Punjab v Baroda at Mohali - Nov 25–28, 2004

Punjab 175 and 370/4d; Baroda 155 and 280 ScorecardPunjab won by 110 runs Services v Rajasthan at Delhi - Nov 25–28, 2004

Rajasthan 290 and 326/5; Services 441/8d ScorecardMatch drawn Uttar Pradesh v Assam at Kanpur - Nov 25–27, 2004

Assam 184 and 107; Uttar Pradesh 132 and 163/2 ScorecardUttar Pradesh won by 8 wickets Vidarbha v Tripura at Nagpur - Nov 25–27, 2004

Tripura 91 and 164; Vidarbha 154 and 102/4 ScorecardVidarbha won by 6 wickets Assam v Tamil Nadu at Guwahati - Dec 4–7, 2004

Tamil Nadu 485/5d and 224/4; Assam 430 ScorecardMatch drawn Bengal v Mumbai at Kolkata - Dec 4–7, 2004

Mumbai 552/7d; Bengal 239 and 181 (f/o) ScorecardMumbai won by an innings and 132 runs Delhi v Madhya Pradesh at Delhi - Dec 4–7, 2004

Delhi 239/9d and 227; Madhya Pradesh 294 and 156/8 ScorecardMatch drawn Goa v Vidarbha at Margao - Dec 4–7, 2004

Goa 371 and 211; Vidarbha 300 and 117 ScorecardGoa won by 165 runs Gujarat v Railways at Ahmedabad - Dec 4–7, 2004

Gujarat 384 and 227/5; Railways 200 ScorecardMatch drawn Himachal Pradesh v Orissa at Dharamsala - Dec 4–7, 2004

Himachal Pradesh 425; Orissa 80 and 302 (f/o) ScorecardHimachal Pradesh won by an innings and 43 runs Hyderabad (India) v Baroda at Hyderabad - Dec 4–7, 2004

Hyderabad (India) 170 and 198; Baroda 93 and 279/5 ScorecardBaroda won by 5 wickets Jharkhand v Kerala at Jamshedpur - Dec 4–7, 2004

Kerala 321 and 161; Jharkhand 315 and 16/2 ScorecardMatch drawn Karnataka v Andhra at Bangalore - Dec 4–7, 2004

Andhra 237 and 245; Karnataka 328 and 158/5 ScorecardKarnataka won by 5 wickets Punjab v Maharashtra at Mohali - Dec 4–6, 2004

Maharashtra 123 and 205; Punjab 566/4d ScorecardPunjab won by an innings and 238 runs Rajasthan v Tripura at Jaipur - Dec 4–7, 2004

Tripura 108 and 116; Rajasthan 338 ScorecardRajasthan won by an innings and 114 runs Saurashtra v Jammu & Kashmir at Rajkot - Dec 4–7, 2004

Jammu & Kashmir 505/9d and 3/0; Saurashtra 596 ScorecardMatch drawn Services v Haryana at Delhi - Dec 4–7, 2004

Haryana 435; Services 185 and 231 (f/o) ScorecardHaryana won by an innings and 19 runs Andhra v Bengal at Visakhapatnam - Dec 13–16, 2004

Bengal 234 and 144; Andhra 188 and 193/6 ScorecardAndhra won by 4 wickets Delhi v Karnataka at Delhi - Dec 13–16, 2004

Delhi 427/7d and 115/1d; Karnataka 292 and 201/7 ScorecardMatch drawn Himachal Pradesh v Jammu & Kashmir at Dharamsala - Dec 13–15, 2004

Jammu & Kashmir 93 and 158; Himachal Pradesh 370 ScorecardHimachal Pradesh won by an innings and 119 runs Hyderabad (India) v Uttar Pradesh at Hyderabad - Dec 13–16, 2004

Hyderabad (India) 246 and 221; Uttar Pradesh 325 and 120 ScorecardHyderabad (India) won by 22 runs Jharkhand v Orissa at Jamshedpur - Dec 13–16, 2004

Orissa 110 and 294; Jharkhand 268 and 137/4 ScorecardJharkhand won by 6 wickets Kerala v Saurashtra at Palakkad - Dec 13–14, 2004

Kerala 117 and 114; Saurashtra 260 ScorecardSaurashtra won by an innings and 29 runs Madhya Pradesh v Railways at Indore - Dec 13–16, 2004

Railways 373 and 82/4; Madhya Pradesh 207 and 303 (f/o) ScorecardMatch drawn Maharashtra v Assam at Aurangabad - Dec 13–15, 2004

Assam 201 and 153; Maharashtra 400 ScorecardMaharashtra won by an innings and 46 runs Mumbai v Gujarat at Mumbai - Dec 13–16, 2004

Gujarat 232 and 171; Mumbai 467 ScorecardMumbai won by an innings and 64 runs Rajasthan v Goa at Jaipur - Dec 13–16, 2004

Goa 198 and 348/9d; Rajasthan 227 and 214/5 ScorecardMatch drawn Tamil Nadu v Punjab at Chennai - Dec 13–16, 2004

Tamil Nadu 244 and 408/9; Punjab 218 ScorecardMatch drawn Tripura v Services at Agartala - Dec 13–16, 2004

Tripura 237 and 196; Services 422 and 14/0 ScorecardServices won by 10 wickets Vidarbha v Haryana at Nagpur - Dec 13–16, 2004

Haryana 154 and 230; Vidarbha 57 and 286 ScorecardHaryana won by 41 runs Andhra v Railways at Anantapur - Dec 22–25, 2004

Railways 263 and 270/4d; Andhra 202 and 198 ScorecardRailways won by 133 runs Baroda v Tamil Nadu at Vadodara - Dec 22–24, 2004

Tamil Nadu 152 and 183; Baroda 64 and 272/6 ScorecardBaroda won by 4 wickets Bengal v Delhi at Kolkata - Dec 22–25, 2004

Bengal 240 and 232; Delhi 251 and 222/2 ScorecardDelhi won by 8 wickets Gujarat v Madhya Pradesh at Ahmedabad - Dec 22–25, 2004

Gujarat 353 and 124/1; Madhya Pradesh 280 ScorecardMatch drawn Hyderabad (India) v Punjab at Hyderabad - Dec 22–24, 2004

Hyderabad (India) 233 and 149; Punjab 105 and 217 ScorecardHyderabad (India) won by 60 runs Jharkhand v Himachal Pradesh at Jamshedpur - Dec 22–25, 2004

Himachal Pradesh 275 and 120; Jharkhand 218 and 155 ScorecardHimachal Pradesh won by 22 runs Kerala v Jammu & Kashmir at Palakkad - Dec 22–25, 2004

Kerala 319 and 281/7d; Jammu & Kashmir 140 and 299 ScorecardKerala won by 161 runs Maharashtra v Uttar Pradesh at Karad - Dec 22–25, 2004

Maharashtra 394 and 119; Uttar Pradesh 282 and 234/5 ScorecardUttar Pradesh won by 5 wickets Mumbai v Karnataka at Mumbai - Dec 22–25, 2004

Mumbai 292 and 264/8d; Karnataka 166 and 185 ScorecardMumbai won by 205 runs Rajasthan v Haryana at Udaipur - Dec 22–25, 2004

Rajasthan 301 and 202; Haryana 412 and 92/1 ScorecardHaryana won by 9 wickets Saurashtra v Orissa at Rajkot - Dec 22–24, 2004

Saurashtra 160 and 245; Orissa 349 and 59/0 ScorecardOrissa won by 10 wickets Services v Vidarbha at Delhi - Dec 22–25, 2004

Vidarbha 184 and 50/1; Services 368 ScorecardMatch drawn Tripura v Goa at Agartala - Dec 22–25, 2004

Goa 278 and 190/8; Tripura 211 ScorecardMatch drawn Andhra v Gujarat at Visakhapatnam - Dec 31, 2004 - Jan 3, 2005

Gujarat 420 and 189; Andhra 314 and 222/7 ScorecardMatch drawn Baroda v Uttar Pradesh at Vadodara - Dec 31, 2004 - Jan 3, 2005

Baroda 186 and 283; Uttar Pradesh 124 and 203 ScorecardBaroda won by 142 runs Bengal v Madhya Pradesh at Kolkata - Dec 31, 2004 - Jan 3, 2005

Madhya Pradesh 392 and 111/2; Bengal 397 ScorecardMatch drawn Hyderabad (India) v Assam at Secunderabad - Dec 31, 2004 - Jan 2, 2005

Hyderabad (India) 340; Assam 158 and 126 (f/o) ScorecardHyderabad (India) won by an innings and 56 runs Karnataka v Railways at Bangalore - Dec 31, 2004 - Jan 3, 2005

Karnataka 194 and 241; Railways 299 and 137/3 ScorecardRailways won by 7 wickets Mumbai v Delhi at Mumbai - Dec 31, 2004 - Jan 3, 2005

Delhi 394 and 37/1; Mumbai 600/9d ScorecardMatch drawn Tamil Nadu v Maharashtra at Chennai - Dec 31, 2004 - Jan 3, 2005

Tamil Nadu 277 and 259/8d; Maharashtra 175 and 170 ScorecardTamil Nadu won by 191 runs Semi Final: Haryana v Jharkhand at Chandigarh - Mar 18–22, 2005

Haryana 453 and 26/0; Jharkhand 308 ScorecardMatch drawn Semi Final: Mumbai v Punjab at Mumbai - Mar 18–21, 2005

Mumbai 251 and 168; Punjab 126 and 294/7 ScorecardPunjab won by 3 wickets Semi Final: Himachal Pradesh v Services at Dharamsala - Mar 18–22, 2005

Himachal Pradesh 50/1 ScorecardMatch drawn Semi Final: Railways v Hyderabad (India) at Delhi - Mar 18–20, 2005

Hyderabad (India) 166 and 170; Railways 180 and 160/3 ScorecardRailways won by 7 wickets Final: Haryana v Services at Gurgaon - Mar 30-Apr 3, 2005

Haryana 342 and 312/8d; Services 191 and 157 ScorecardHaryana won by 306 runs Final: Punjab v Railways at Mohali - Mar 30-Apr 3, 2005

Railways 355 and 471; Punjab 309 and 137/4 ScorecardMatch drawn

=== Semifinal 1 ===
18–22 March 2005
Scorecard

Hyderabad	v	Railways
166 (57.5 overs); Anirudh Singh 92 (171); Harvinder Singh 4/28 (15 overs)		180 (59.5 overs); Amit Pagnis 42 (65); Pragyan Ojha 5/55 (22 overs)
170 (84.5 overs); Daniel Manohar 75 (250); Harvinder Singh 3/32 (11.5 overs)		160/3 (47 overs); Amit Pagnis 98 (141); Pragyan Ojha 2/58 (18 overs)

Railways won by 7 wickets
Karnail Singh Stadium, Delhi
Umpires: Sameer Bandekar and Suresh Shastri

- Hyderabad won the toss and elected to bat.

=== Semifinal 2 ===
18–22 March 2005
Scorecard

Mumbai	v	Punjab
251 (57.5 overs); Amol Mazumdar 75 (180); Gagandeep Singh 4/67 (20 overs)		126 (61.3 overs); Pankaj Dharmani 32 (65); Sairaj Bahutule 4/20 (13 overs)
168 (64.3 overs); Nishit Shetty 69 (105); Gagandeep Singh 4/51 (17 overs)		294/7 (100.4 overs); Pankaj Dharmani 86 (227); Ajit Agarkar 4/84 (27 overs)

Punjab won by 3 wickets
Wankhede Stadium, Mumbai
Umpires: Balwant Sharma and Ravi Subramanian

- Mumbai won the toss and elected to field.

=== Final ===
30 March - 3 April 2005
Scorecard

Railways	v	Punjab
355 (120.1 overs); Raja Ali 80 (193); Vineet Sharma 5/91 (28.1 overs)		309 (120.2 overs); Pankaj Dharmani 115 (246); Jai Prakash Yadav 5/83 (37.2 overs)
471 (152.3 overs); Yere Goud 138* (288); Rajesh Sharma 3/142 (44 overs)		137/4 (47 overs); Ravneet Ricky 64 (111); Sanjay Bangar 2/15 (7 overs)

Match drawn
Punjab Cricket Association Stadium, Mohali
Umpires: CR Mohite and MR Singh

- Punjab on the toss and elected to field.
- Railways won the 2004-05 Ranji Trophy through its first innings lead.

== Scorecards and averages ==
- CricketArchive
