= 1947–48 Ranji Trophy =

Indian cricket tournament

- The Ranji Trophy
- Administrator: BCCI
- Cricket format: First-class
- Tournament format: Knockout
- Champions: Holkar (2nd title)
- Participants: 17
- Most runs: K. C. Ibrahim (Bombay) (606)
- Most wickets: Hiralal Gaekwad (Holkar) (29)

The 1947–48 Ranji Trophy was the 14th season of the Ranji Trophy. Holkar won the title defeating Bombay in the final.

== Zonal Matches ==
=== West Zone ===
Round 1
20 Dec 1947 – Ahmedabad
Gujarat	158 & 130
Kathiawar	159 & 131/5
12 Dec 1947 – Bombay
Bombay	638/8d
Sind	128 & 57
5 Dec 1947 – Jamnagar
Nawanagar	240 & 241
Maharashtra	211 & 271/9

Round 2
18 Jan 1948 – Dhrol
Kathiawar	244 & 143/8
Baroda	177 & 209
25 Dec 1947 – Bombay
Bombay	632/7d
Maharashtra	200 & 294

Round 3
13 Feb 1948 – Dhrol
Kathiawar	331 & 106/2
Bombay	375 & 254/5d

=== North Zone ===
Round 1
12 Dec 1947 – Delhi
Delhi	282
Rajputana	113 & 125

=== South Zone ===
Round 1
15 Dec 1947 – Bangalore
Mysore	136 & 101
Central Provinces and Berar	195 & 155
19 Dec 1947 – Secunderabad
Hyderabad	201 & 233
Madras	88 & 92

Round 2
24 Dec 1947 – Nagpur
Central Provinces and Berar	71 & 175
Hyderabad	182 & 68/1

=== East Zone ===
Round 1
31 Dec 1947 – Calcutta
Bengal	95 & 256
Holkar	212 & 267
10 Jan 1948 – Allahabad
United Provinces	138 & 99/2
Bihar	95 & 140

Round 2
16 Jan 1948 – Indore
Holkar	485
United Provinces	164 & 88

== Inter-Zonal Knockout matches ==
Semi-finals
21 Feb 1948 – Indore
Holkar	498
Delhi	187 & 181
6 Mar 1948 – Bombay
Bombay	652
Hyderabad	282 & 214

Final
20 Mar 1948 – Baroda
Holkar	361 & 95/1
Bombay	191 & 261

== Final ==
20–23 March 1948
Scorecard

Bombay	v	Holkar (H)
191 (88 overs); K. C. Ibrahim 49; Hiralal Gaekwad 3/19		361 (111.5 overs); C. S. Nayudu 96; Keki Tarapore 4/127
261 (116.1 overs); Dattu Phadkar 55; Hiralal Gaekwad 6/90		95/1 (22.2 overs); Mushtaq Ali 44*; Dattu Phadkar 1/33

Holkar won by nine wickets
Yeshwant Club Ground, Indore
Umpires: M. G. Bhave and M. G. Vijayasarathi

- Bombay won the toss and decided to bat
- Timeless match, ended on the fourth day

== Scorecards and averages ==
- CricketArchive
