= D. Narottam =

Indian cricketer

Personal information
- Born: 29 August 1922; Sindh, British India
- Source: ESPNcricinfo, 23 October 2016

D. Narottam (born 29 August 1922, date of death unknown) was an Indian cricketer. He played in 27 first-class matches between 1943 and 1960. He took a hat-trick in the 1947–48 Ranji Trophy playing for Kathiawar against Baroda. Narottam is deceased.

== See also ==
- List of hat-tricks in the Ranji Trophy
