= Uttar Dakshin =

1987 Indian action drama film

- poster
- Directed by: Prabhat Khanna
- Story by: Subhash Ghai
- Produced by: Ashok Khanna; Subhash Ghai
- Starring: Rajnikanth; Jackie Shroff; Madhuri Dixit; Bharathi
- Music by: Laxmikant Pyarelal
- Release date: 13 November 1987
- Country: India
- Language: Hindi

Uttar Dakshin (transl. North and South) is a 1987 Hindi-language action drama film produced by Ashok Khanna and Subhash Ghai, directed by Prabhat Khanna and featuring Rajinikanth, Jackie Shroff, Madhuri Dixit and Bharathi in the lead roles. Laxmikant Pyarelal have composed the music, while Anand Bakshi has written the lyrics for the film.

== Plot ==
At the time of his mother's death, Raja learns that his father is still alive and living a wealthy life. Raja now befriends Shankaran, his step-brother, and steals his girlfriend Chanda. He also fraudulently takes the signatures of Shankaran on certain property papers. However, Shankaran's mother is a very intelligent lady and catches Raja red-handed, but she does not hand him over to the police when she learns that he is her step-son. Meanwhile, Shankran is unable to handle Chanda's rejection and is in grief. Nevertheless, he too excuses Raja after he learns that he is his step-brother. When their father Krishnakant returns from abroad and becomes aware of this, he is very upset. He is about to take action against Raja, but excuses him after he learns that he is his elder son.

== Cast ==
- Rajinikanth as Shankaran
- Jackie Shroff as Raja
- Madhuri Dixit as Chanda
- Bharathi as Bharathi
- Kulbhushan Kharbanda as Krishna Kant
- Seema Deo as Sharda
- Lalita Pawar as Raja's grandmother
- Anupam Kher as Ramniklal
- Paresh Rawal as Varda Rai
- Preeti Ganguli
- Beena Banerjee as Anju
- Vinod Kapoor as Anju's husband (special appearance)
- Bob Christo as Bob
- Satish Kaushik as Kashiram
- Anjana Mumtaz as Ram Pyari
- Sudhir as Rasiklal

== Soundtrack ==
Song	Singer
"Laila Mar Gayi"	Anuradha Paudwal
"Keh Do Uttarwalon Se"	Anuradha Paudwal, Mohammed Aziz, Manhar Udhas
"Kis Naam Se Tujhko Yaad Karoon"	Mohammed Aziz
"Us Kashti Ka Kya Hoga" (Male)	Mohammed Aziz
"Us Kashti Ka Kya Hoga" (Female)	Kavita Krishnamurthy
"Thodi Si Aag"	Kavita Krishnamurthy, Hariharan
