= Ajay Barik =

Indian cricketer (born 1976)

Personal information
- Full name: Ajay Barik
- Born: 10 January 1976 (age 50); Cuttack, Orissa, India
- Batting: Right-handed
- Bowling: Right-arm Medium
- Role: Bowler

Domestic team information
- Years: Team
- 1996–2003: Orissa

Career statistics
Competition	FC	List A
Matches	38	15
Runs scored	140	42
Batting average	4.66	21.00
100s/50s	0/1	0/0
Top score	50*	15*
Balls bowled	3400	722
Wickets	96	10
Bowling average	35.41	46.00
5 wickets in innings	1	0
10 wickets in match	0	0
Best bowling	5/18	2/15
Catches/stumpings	19/–	3/–
- Source: ESPNcricinfo, 25 October 2016

Ajay Barik (born 10 January 1976) is a first-class cricketer who played for Orissa in the Ranji Trophy. He was born in Cuttack, Orissa, India.

Ajay is a right-hand batsman and right-arm medium bowler. He took a hat-trick in the 2001-02 Ranji Trophy playing for Orissa against Assam.

== Teams ==
Ranji Trophy: Orissa

== See also ==
- List of hat-tricks in the Ranji Trophy
