= 1963–64 Ranji Trophy =

Indian cricket tournament

- The Ranji Trophy
- Administrator(s): BCCI
- Cricket format: First-class
- Tournament format(s): League and knockout
- Champions: Bombay (15th title)
- Participants: 24
- Most runs: Vijay Mehra (Delhi) (601)
- Most wickets: Vijay Sondhi (Delhi) (32)

The 1963–64 Ranji Trophy was the 30th season of the Ranji Trophy. Bombay won the title defeating Rajasthan in the final. This was the fourth consecutive final between the two teams, all of which were won by Bombay

== Highlights ==
- On a rain affected wicket in Bangalore against Mysore, Kerala got all out for 27 in two hours. Kerala lost the first four wickets for zero runs and first nine for 12. TK Madhavan batting at No.11 top scored with 11 and the last wicket more than doubled the score.
- Delhi and Jammu Kashmir played the second shortest match in Ranji trophy. Jammu & Kashmir finished the first day on 37 for 9 in the second innings, and were all out for 38 early on the second day to lose by an innings.
- Jammu and Kashmir failed to reach 100 in the eight innings in their last four matches.
- Joginder Rao of Services took a hat-trick on his debut against Jammu and Kashmir.
- In his second match, against Northern Punjab, Rao took two hat-tricks in the same innings. Three hat-tricks in two matches is a unique feat. Albert Trott is the only other bowler to take two hat-tricks in the same innings.

== Group stage ==
=== South Zone ===
Team	Pld	W	L	D	T	NR	Pts	Q
Mysore	4	3	0	1	0	0	31	2.984
Madras	4	2	0	2	0	0	23	1.529
Hyderabad	4	2	1	1	0	0	20	1.251
Kerala	4	1	3	0	0	0	8	0.468
Andhra	4	0	4	0	0	0	0	0.481

=== North Zone ===
Team	Pld	W	L	D	T	NR	Pts	Q
Delhi	5	4	0	1	0	0	49	2.236
Services	5	3	0	2	0	0	33	1.782
Railways	5	2	1	2	0	0	25	2.108
Northern Punjab	5	2	3	0	0	0	17	0.835
Southern Punjab	5	1	3	1	0	0	13	0.657
Jammu & Kashmir	5	0	5	0	0	0	0	0.175

=== East Zone ===
Team	Pld	W	L	D	T	NR	Pts	Q
Bengal	3	1	0	2	0	0	19	2.139
Bihar	3	1	0	2	0	0	15	1.210
Orissa	3	0	1	2	0	0	10	0.625
Assam	3	0	1	2	0	0	6	0.654

=== West Zone ===
Team	Pld	W	L	D	T	NR	Pts	Q
Bombay	4	2	0	2	0	0	27	2.160
Maharashtra	4	1	0	3	0	0	21	1.852
Baroda	4	1	1	2	0	0	16	0.713
Gujarat	4	0	1	3	0	0	11	0.720
Saurashtra	4	0	2	2	0	0	6	0.526

=== Central Zone ===
Team	Pld	W	L	D	T	NR	Pts	Q
Rajasthan	3	2	0	1	0	0	22	2.264
Vidarbha	3	1	1	1	0	0	11	0.497
Madhya Pradesh	3	1	2	0	0	0	9	0.925
Uttar Pradesh	3	1	2	0	0	0	8	0.998

== Knockout stage ==
Quarter-finals
6 Mar 1964 – Delhi
Delhi	524 & 174
Bengal	308 & 149/4

Semi-finals
6 Mar 1964 – Bangalore
Mysore	155 & 256
Bombay	299 & 113/3
13 Mar 1964 – Jaipur
Rajasthan	231 & 236/5
Delhi	126 & 330

Final
20 Mar 1964 – Bombay
Bombay	526 & 21/1
Rajasthan	108 & 438

=== Final ===
20–24 Mar 1964
Scorecard

Bombay (H)	v	Rajasthan
526 (150 overs); Sharad Diwadkar 177; G. R. Sunderam 4/71		108 (57 overs); Salim Durani 30; Ramakant Desai 3/18
21/1 (4.3 overs); Ashok Mankad 18*; G. R. Sunderam 1/7		438 (163.5 overs, follow on); Hanumant Singh 128, Salim Durani 118, Vijay Manjrekar 105; Arun Varde 3/69

Bombay won by 9 wickets
Brabourne Stadium, Bombay
Umpires: Santosh Ganguli and B. Satyaji Rao

- Rajasthan won the toss and elected to field

== Scorecards and averages ==
- ESPNcricinfo
- CricketArchive
