= List of Ranji Trophy records =

Cricket records

This is a list of Ranji Trophy records, with each list containing the top five performances in the category. The Ranji Trophy is the premier first-class cricket competition in India.

Currently active players are bolded.

== Batting records ==
=== Highest individual scores ===
Score	Player	For	Against	Year
443*	B. B. Nimbalkar	Maharashtra	Kathiawar	1948/49
400*	Chinmay Sutar	Mizoram	Nagaland	2026/27
379	**Prithvi Shaw**	Mumbai	Assam	2022/23
377	Sanjay Manjrekar	Bombay	Hyderabad	1990/91
366	M. V. Sridhar	Hyderabad	Andhra	1993/94
366	**Tanmay Agarwal**	Hyderabad	Arunachal	2023/24
359*	Vijay Merchant	Bombay	Maharashtra	1943/44
359*	**Samit Gohel**	Gujarat	Odisha	2016/17
353	V. V. S. Laxman	Hyderabad	Karnataka	1999/00
352	Cheteshwar Pujara	Saurashtra	Karnataka	2012/13
351*	Aakash Chopra	Maharashtra	Delhi	2016/17
343	**Puneet Bisht**	Meghalaya	Sikkim	2018/19
341	**Sakibul Gani**	Bihar	Mizoram	2021/22
340	Sunil Gavaskar	Mumbai	Bengal	1981/82
338	**Prashant Chopra**	Himachal Pradesh	Punjab	2017/18

=== Most career centuries ===
Centuries	Player	Teams	Career span
40	Wasim Jaffer	Mumbai, Vidarbha	1996/97 – 2019/20
31	Ajay Sharma	Delhi, Himachal Pradesh	1984/85 – 2000/01
30	Paras Dogra	Himachal Pradesh, Pondicherry	2001/02 – 2022/23
28	Hrishikesh Kanitkar	Maharashtra, Madhya Pradesh, Rajasthan	1994/95 – 2013/14
28	Amol Muzumdar	Bombay/Mumbai, Assam, Andhra	1993/94 – 2013/14
27	Amarjit Kaypee	Punjab, Haryana	1980/81 – 1999/00
26	Brijesh Patel	Mysore/Karnataka	1969/70 – 1987/88
26	Surendra Bhave	Maharashtra	1986/87 – 2000/01
25	Mithun Manhas	Delhi,Jammu and Kashmir	1997/98: 2016/17
25	KL Rahul	Karnataka	2016/17: 2026
24	Vinod Kambli	Bombay/Mumbai	1989/90 – 2004/05
24	Subramaniam Badrinath	Tamil Nadu, Vidarbha, Hyderabad	2000/01 – 2016/17
24	Devendra Bundela	Madhya Pradesh	1995/96 – 2017/18
Source: CricketArchive. Last updated: 16 January 2019.

=== Highest career average ===
Qualification: 2000+runs

Average	Player	Teams	Runs
98.35	Vijay Merchant	Bombay	3639
85.62	Sachin Tendulkar	Bombay/Mumbai	4281
80.61	V. V. S. Laxman	Hyderabad	5764
78.29	Ajay Sharma	Delhi, Himachal Pradesh	7438
76.08	Ashok Mankad	Bombay	6619
72.87	Rohit Sharma	Mumbai	3892
Source: CricketArchive. Last updated: 13 March 2020.

=== Most runs in a season ===
Score	Player	Team	Season
1415	V. V. S. Laxman	Hyderabad	1999/00
1380	Vijay Bharadwaj	Karnataka	1998/99
1340	**Rahul Dalal**	Arunachal Pradesh	2019/20
1331	**Milind Kumar**	Sikkim	2018/19
1330	**Shreyas Iyer**	Mumbai	2015/16
1310	**Priyank Panchal**	Gujarat	2016/17
1260	Wasim Jaffer	Mumbai	2008/09
1223	**Kedar Jadhav**	Maharashtra	2013/14
1160	**Mayank Agarwal**	Karnataka	2017/18
1089	**Ajinkya Rahane**	Mumbai	2008/09
Source: . Last updated: 4 February 2020.

== Bowling records ==
=== Most career wickets ===
Wickets	Player	Teams	Career span
639	Rajinder Goel	Patiala, Southern Punjab, Delhi, Haryana	1958/59 – 1984/85
531	Srinivasaraghavan Venkataraghavan	Tamil Nadu	1963/64 – 1984/85
479	Sunil Joshi	Karnataka	1992/93 – 2010/11
442	Vinay Kumar	Karnataka, Pondicherry	2004/05 – 2019/20
441	Narendra Hirwani	Madhya Pradesh, Bengal	1984/85 – 2005/06
437	Bhagwat Chandrasekhar	Karnataka	1963/64 – 1979/80
Source: CricketArchive. Last updated: 13 February 2024.

=== Best bowling figures in an innings ===
Score	Player	Team	Opponent	Season
10/20	Premangsu Chatterjee	Bengal	Assam	1956/57
10/78	Pradeep Sunderam	Rajasthan	Vidarbha	1985/86
9/23	Ankeet Chavan	Mumbai	Punjab	2012/13
9/25	Hyder Ali	Railways	Jammu and Kashmir	1969/70
9/29	Faisal Shaikh	Goa	Services	2002/03
Source: CricketArchive. Last updated: 19 December 2012.

=== Most wickets in a season ===
Wickets	Player	Team	Season
69	Harsh Dubey	Vidarbha	2024-25
68	**Ashutosh Aman**	Bihar	2018/19
67	**Jaydev Unadkat**	Saurashtra	2019/20
64	Bishan Singh Bedi	Delhi	1974/75
62	Dodda Ganesh	Karnataka	1998/99
62	Kanwaljit Singh	Hyderabad	1999/00
60	**Auqib Nabi**	Jammu and Kashmir	2025/26
59	**Mayank Mishra**	Uttarakhand	2025/26
59	**Dharmendrasinh Jadeja**	Saurashtra	2018/19
58	Srinivasaraghavan Venkataraghavan	Tamil Nadu	1972/73
58	Maninder Singh	Delhi	1991/92
57	Ranadeb Bose	Bengal	2006/07
56	**Shahbaz Nadeem**	Jharkhand	2016/17
Source: CricketArchive. Last updated: 4 March 2020.

== Team records ==
=== Highest innings totals ===
Score	Team	Opponent	Season
944/6 dec	Hyderabad	Andhra	1993/94
912/6 dec	Tamil Nadu	Goa	1988/89
912/8 dec	Holkar	Mysore	1945/46
880/10	Jharkhand	Nagaland	2021/22
855/6 dec	Mumbai	Hyderabad	1990/91
826/ kkim]]	2018/19		
Source: CricketArchive. Last updated: 1 January 2019.

=== Lowest innings totals ===
Score	Team	Opponent	Season
21	Hyderabad	Rajasthan	2010/11
22	Southern Punjab	Northern India	1934/35
23	Sind	Southern Punjab	1938/39
23	Jammu and Kashmir	Delhi	1960/61
23	Jammu and Kashmir	Haryana	1977/78
Source: CricketArchive. Last updated: 16 October 2016.

=== Highest partnerships per wicket ===
Wicket	Score	Players	Team	Opponent	Season
1st	464	Ravi Sehgal & Raman Lamba	Delhi	Himachal Pradesh	1994/95
2nd	475	Zahir Alam & Lalchand Rajput	Assam	Tripura	1991/92
3rd	594*	**Swapnil Gugale** & **Ankit Bawne**	Maharashtra	Delhi	2016/17
4th	577	Vijay Hazare & Gul Mohammad	Baroda	Holkar	1946/47
5th	520*	Cheteshwar Pujara & **Ravindra Jadeja**	Saurashtra	Orissa	2008/09
6th	417	**Wriddhiman Saha** & Laxmi Ratan Shukla	Bengal	Assam	2010/11
7th	460	Bhupinder Singh Jr. & Pankaj Dharmani	Punjab	Delhi	1994/95
8th	392	**Amit Mishra** & **Jayant Yadav**	Haryana	Karnataka	2012/13
9th	249*	Ankit Srivastava & Kapil Seth	Madhya Pradesh	Vidarbha	2000/01
10th	233	Ajay Sharma & Maninder Singh	Delhi	Bombay	1991/92
Source: CricketArchive. Last updated: February 2013.

== See also ==
- List of hat-tricks in the Ranji Trophy

== Notes ==
All lists are referenced to CricketArchive.
