= Damodaran Devanand =

Indian cricketer (born 1972)

Personal information
- Full name: Damodaran Devanand
- Born: 31 July 1972 (age 54); Ranipettai, Tamil Nadu, India
- Batting: Right-handed
- Bowling: Left-arm Medium
- Role: Bowler

Domestic team information
- Years: Team
- 1995–2000: Tamil Nadu

Career statistics
| Competition | FC | List A |
|---|---|---|
| Matches | 11 | 10 |
| Runs scored | 35 | 8 |
| Batting average | 5.83 | 2.66 |
| 100s/50s | 0/0 | 0/0 |
| Top score | 7* | 4 |
| Balls bowled | 1955 | 516 |
| Wickets | 27 | 17 |
| Bowling average | 30.00 | 17.17 |
| 5 wickets in innings | 1 | 0 |
| 10 wickets in match | 0 | 0 |
| Best bowling | 7/74 | 4/14 |
| Catches/stumpings | 2/– | -/– |
- Source: ESPNcricinfo, 25 October 2016

Damodaran Devanand (born 31 July 1972) is a first-class cricketer who played for Tamil Nadu in the Ranji Trophy. He was born in Ranipettai, Tamil Nadu, India.

Damodaran is a right-hand batsman and Right-arm Medium bowler. He took a hat-trick in the 2001-02 Ranji Trophy playing for Tamil Nadu against Orissa.

== Teams ==
Ranji Trophy: Tamil Nadu

== See also ==
- List of hat-tricks in the Ranji Trophy
