= List of Tamil Nadu List A cricket records =

This is a list of Tamil Nadu List A cricket records, with each list containing the top five performances in the category.

Currently active players are bolded.

== Team records ==
=== Highest innings totals ===
Rank	Score	Opponent	Season
1	384/7	Rajasthan	2015/16
2	379/6	Bengal	2009/10
3	376/4	Hyderabad	2010/11
4	369/4	Kerala	2008/09
5	348/5	Madhya Pradesh	2009/10
Source: CricketArchive. Last updated: 20 October 2016.

=== Lowest innings totals ===
Rank	Score	Opponent	Season
1	69	Hyderabad	1993/94
1	90	Bengal	2013/14
Source: CricketArchive. Last updated: 20 October 2016.

=== Largest Margin of Runs Victory ===
Rank	Margin	Opponent	Season
1	252 runs	Rajasthan	2015/16
2	185 runs	Kerala	2008/09
3	174 runs	Mumbai	2009/10
4	149 runs	Andhra	2004/05
5	144 runs	Goa	1993/94
Source: CricketArchive. Last updated: 20 October 2016.

== Batting records ==
=== Highest individual scores ===
Rank	Score	Player	Opponent	Season
1	154*	**Dinesh Karthik**	Hyderabad	2010/11
2	145	Thalaisayanam Karunamurthy	Andhra	1995/96
3	139	**Abhinav Mukund**	Hyderabad	2014/15
4	137	**Dinesh Karthik**	Karnataka	2011/12
5	137	**Baba Aparajith**	Rajasthan	2015/16
Source: CricketArchive. Last updated: 20 October 2016.

== Bowling records ==
=== Best innings bowling ===
Rank	Score	Player	Opponent	Season
1	7/46	Selvam Suresh Kumar	Goa	2009/10
2	6/37	**Rahil Shah**	Rajasthan	2015/16
3	5/25	Sunil Subramaniam	Kerala	1993/94
4	5/31	Sadagoppan Ramesh	Kerala	2000/01
5	5/26	**R Sai Kishore**	Rajasthan	2017/18
Source: CricketArchive. Last updated: 20 October 2016.

=== Hat-Trick ===
Rank	Player	Opponent	Season
1	Vidyut Sivaramakrishnan	Kerala	2003/04
2	Sadagoppan Ramesh	Bengal	2004/05
Source: CricketArchive. Last updated: 20 October 2016.

== Notes ==
All lists are referenced to CricketArchive.

== See also ==
- Tamil Nadu cricket team
- List of Tamil Nadu first-class cricket records
