= Rakesh Parikh =

Indian first-class cricketer, born 1963

Personal information
- Full name: Rakesh Bipinbhai Parikh
- Born: 13 December 1963 (age 62); Halol, Gujarat, India
- Batting: Right-handed
- Role: Batsman

Domestic team information
- Years: Team
- 1983/84–1995/96: Baroda

Career statistics
Competition	FC	List A
Matches	52	5
Runs scored	3,721	95
Batting average	45.37	19.00
100s/50s	9/19	0/0
Top score	218	39
Balls bowled	42	–
Wickets	0	–
Bowling average	–	–
5 wickets in innings	–	–
10 wickets in match	–	n/a
Best bowling	–	–
Catches/stumpings	34/–	1/–
- Source: ESPNcricinfo, 7 February 2016

Rakesh Parikh (born 13 December 1963) is an Indian former first-class cricketer who played for Baroda. As of January 2016, he is a member of the Indian junior team selection committee.

== Career ==
Parikh played as a right-handed opening batsman and appeared in 52 first-class and 5 List A matches. He scored more than 3700 first-class runs at an average of over 45 and nine hundreds, in a career lasted for 13 seasons starting from 1983–84 at the age of 21. He was the second-highest run-getter of the 1989–90 Ranji Trophy in which he scored 716 runs in 6 games at an average of 89.50 with three centuries. He also scored his personal best 218 in the same season, playing for West Zone against South Zone in the Duleep Trophy.

Parikh worked with the Baroda Cricket Association (BCA) after retirement. He was a member of Indian junior team selection committee from 2006 to 2008. He was on the selection committee that selected Virat Kohli as the Indian captain for the 2008 Under-19 Cricket World Cup. He became the junior team selector for the second time in November 2015, before which he was the vice-president of BCA. He also worked on the National Cricket Academy Board appointed by the BCCI. Parikh was the Indian team manager on its Sri Lankan tour in August 2015.
