= Pradeep Sunderam =

Indian cricketer and coach (born 1960)

Personal information
- Born: 21 March 1960 (age 66); Jaipur, Rajasthan, India
- Batting: Right-handed
- Bowling: Right-arm medium-fast
- Role: Bowler
- Relatives: Gundibail Sunderam (father)

Domestic team information
- Years: Team
- 1982/83–1990/91: Rajasthan

Career statistics
Competition	FC	List A
Matches	40	12
Runs scored	286	20
Batting average	9.22	10.00
100s/50s	0/0	0/0
Top score	34	10*
Balls bowled	4174	572
Wickets	145	16
Bowling average	28.78	28.00
5 wickets in innings	11	0
10 wickets in match	3	n/a
Best bowling	10/78	3/33
Catches/stumpings	10/–	1/–
- Source: ESPNcricinfo, 31 November 2015

Pradeep Sunderam (born 21 March 1960) is a former Indian first-class cricketer who currently works as a cricket coach. During his playing career, Sunderam represented Rajasthan cricket team between 1982/83 and 1990/91. Sunderam is one of the two bowlers to have taken all ten wickets in an innings of a Ranji Trophy match, having achieved the feat in the 1985/86 season when he took 10/78 in an innings.

Sunderam became the head coach of the Rajasthan team in 2013. He is the son of former India Test bowler Gundibail Sunderam.

== Career ==
Sunderam is one of the four children of Gundibail Sunderam, a former Rajasthan fast bowler who played for India in two Test matches. Like his father, Sunderam also became a fast bowler and made his first-class cricket debut for Rajasthan in 1982/83. In a Ranji Trophy match in 1985/86 against Vidarbha, Sunderam famously claimed all ten wickets in an innings, becoming only the second bowler in the history of Ranji Trophy to achieve the feat. He had figures of 10/78 in 22 overs of Vidarbha's first innings and 6/76 in 22 overs in the second innings. His match figures of 16/154 also became the best match figures in Ranji Trophy history that has since been bettered by Anil Kumble.

After his playing career, Sunderam took up the job of cricket coaching. For more than a decade, he worked as the head coach of Mumbai Cricket Association Academy and also coached Mumbai under-23 team. In 2013, Rajasthan Cricket Association appointed Sunderam as Rajasthan team's head coach based on the recommendation by their previous head coach Chandrakant Pandit. Sunderam is also a talent scout with the Mumbai Cricket Association.
