= 2. Divisioona =

4th level men's ice hockey league in Finland

- Sport: Ice hockey
- Founded: 1975; 50 years ago
- No. of teams: 54
- Country: Finland
- Level on pyramid: Level 4
- Promotion to: Suomi-sarja
- Relegation to: 3. Divisioona
- Domestic cup(s): Finnish Cup

2. Divisioona or II-divisioona (Finnish for '2nd Division'), also known as Rautaliiga, is the fourth-highest men's national ice hockey league in Finland, above 3. Divisioona and below the Suomi-sarja. The league is divided geographically into six divisions.

2. Divisioona used to be the third-highest league in Finland before the introduction of Suomi-sarja.

== Teams ==
=== 2022–23 season ===
==== Division 1 – South ====
Team	City
GrIFK	Kauniainen
HAKI	Vihti
Jää-Ahmat	Hyvinkää
Jäähonka	Espoo
KelA	Tuusula
Kurra HT	Nurmijärvi
TuusKi	Tuusula
Viikingit	Helsinki
Wolf	Sipoo

==== Division 2 - Tavastia ====
Team	City
Kraft	Närpiö
K-Ahma	Valkeakoski
Kisa-Eagles	Kangasala
KJK	Kankaanpää
KOOVEE II	Tampere
KPK	Mänttä-Vilppula
Nikkarit	Riihimäki
Pingviinit	Pirkkala
Pyry Ak	Nokia
Uplakers	Ylöjärvi

==== Division 3 - Central ====
Team	City
APV	Alavus
Highsticks HT	Pietarsaari
IFK Lepplax	Pedersöre
IKK	Kruunupyy
Kraft	Närpiö
KuRy	Kurikka
MIF	Maalahti

==== Division 4 - Savonia-Karelia ====
Team	City
Gladiators HT	Laukaa
LeKi-75	Leppävirta
Pelikaanit	Jyväskylä
PEPO	Lappeenranta
Pesä	Imatra
SuKiKa	Suonenjoki
Urho	Äänekoski
ValKi	Kouvola
Warkis	Varkaus

==== Division 5 - Northern ====
Team	City
Cowboys	Nivala
Et-Po	Ylitornio
KeKi	Kemijärvi
KuKi HT	Kuhmo
Laser HT	Oulu
LiKi	Liminka
PaKa	Kuusamo
TIHC	Tornio
VTS	Sotkamo
YJK	Ylivieska

==== Division 6 - West Coast ====
Team	City
Chiefs	Turku
Haka	Paimio
Kiekkohait	Salo
KuKi	Harjavalta
LaJy	Laitila
LuKi-82	Eurajoki
PKS	Paimio
RNK Hoci	Raisio
VG-62	Naantali
