= Ramakrishnan Ramkumar =

Indian cricketer (born 1980)

R Ramkumar
Personal information
- Full name: Ramakrishnan Ramkumar
- Born: 27 March 1980 (age 46); Cuddalore, Tamil Nadu, India
- Batting: Left-handed
- Bowling: Slow Left-arm orthodox
- Role: Bowler

Domestic team information
- Years: Team
- 2001–2008: Tamil Nadu

Career statistics
Competition	FC	List A
Matches	35	30
Runs scored	851	364
Batting average	22.39	21.41
100s/50s	0/3	1/0
Top score	73	101
Balls bowled	7111	1481
Wickets	111	33
Bowling average	26.31	32.00
5 wickets in innings	5	0
10 wickets in match	2	0
Best bowling	6/47	3/35
Catches/stumpings	13/–	6/–
- Source: Cricinfo, 25 October 2016

Ramakrishnan Ramkumar (born 27 March 1980) is a first-class cricketer who played for Tamil Nadu in the Ranji Trophy. He was born in Cuddalore, Tamil Nadu, India.

Ramkumar is a left-hand batsman and left-arm orthodox bowler. He took a hat-trick in the 2003-04 Ranji Trophy playing for Tamil Nadu against Karnataka.

== Teams ==
Ranji Trophy: Tamil Nadu

== See also ==
- List of hat-tricks in the Ranji Trophy
