= Kamal Bhandarkar =

Indian cricketer

Personal information
- Full name: Kamal Vinayakrao Bhandarkar
- Born: 21 February 1911; Lonavala, Bombay Presidency, British India
- Died: 10 December 1986 (aged 75); Pune, Maharashtra, India
- Batting: Right-handed
- Role: Wicketkeeper-batsman

Domestic team information
- Years: Team
- 1935–36 to 1937–38: Central India
- 1939–40 to 1949–50: Maharashtra
- 1941–42 to 1947–48: Holkar

Career statistics
Competition	First-class
Matches	30
Runs scored	1357
Batting average	30.84
100s/50s	3/5
Top score	205
Balls bowled	6
Wickets	0
Bowling average	–
5 wickets in innings	0
10 wickets in match	0
Best bowling	–
Catches/stumpings	30/20
- Source: ESPNcricinfo, 1 March 2021

Kamal Vinayakrao Bhandarkar (21 February 1911 – 10 December 1986) was an Indian cricketer who played first-class cricket from 1935 to 1949.

Bhandarkar was a wicketkeeper-batsman. He was a member of the Ranji Trophy winning teams of Maharashtra in 1939–40 and Holkar in 1945–46. Opening the batting for Maharashtra against Kathiawar in the Ranji Trophy in 1948–49, he scored 205 and set a world record second-wicket partnership of 455 with B. B. Nimbalkar, who scored 443 not out. The record stood until 1974. Like Nimbalkar, Bhandarkar was also a gifted Indian first-class cricketer who never played Test cricket.

Bhandarkar later took up coaching, and was one of the leading coaches in India from 1950 until his death in 1986. His pupils included the Indian Test captains Chandu Borde and Sunil Gavaskar.

Bhandarkar was a science graduate of Nowrosjee Wadia College in Pune, who worked in the zoology department of the college as a demonstrator.
