= Joginder Singh Rao =

J. S. Rao
Personal information
- Full name: Rao Joginder Singh
- Born: 16 October 1938; Gurgaon, Haryana, British India
- Died: 3 October 1994 (aged 55)
- Bowling: Right-arm medium

Career statistics
Competition	First-class
Matches	5
Runs scored	22
Batting average	22.00
100s/50s	0/0
Top score	14
Balls bowled	642
Wickets	21
Bowling average	9.66
5 wickets in innings	2
10 wickets in match	0
Best bowling	7/30
Catches/stumpings	2/0
- Source: ESPNcricinfo, 28 May 2020

Rao Joginder Singh (16 October 1938 – 3 October 1994), whose name was recorded as Joginder Singh Rao throughout his career, was an Indian cricketer: a right-arm medium pace bowler who played only five first-class games, all for Services in the 1963–64 Ranji Trophy, but who is notable for having not only taken a hat-trick on debut, but for following that up with two more in the same innings of his second match, one of only two men to have achieved this latter feat (the other being Albert Trott) and the only man to have taken three in his first two games.

Born in Gurgaon, Punjab, Rao became only the seventh man to achieve the hat-trick on debut when he dismissed three Jammu and Kashmir batsmen as they were bowled out for just 47. Less than a week later, he went one better against Northern Punjab, when he claimed two hat-tricks in the second innings. His six victims were: Suresh Sharma, Ashok Khanna, Bhupinder Singh; and Rajinder Kale, Ramnath Paul, Bishen Singh Bedi.

Rao played only three more times, as shortly afterwards he was injured in a parachuting accident while serving as a captain in the army. He took up golf and represented India in France and Pakistan. He redesigned the Army golf course in the Delhi Cantonment and the Dehra Dun golf course. He served in the India-Pakistan wars in 1965 and 1971, and reached the rank of Major-General in the Indian Army.

== Personal life ==
He married Nandita Rao and had two sons with her, Probir and Rahul.

He died in India on 3 October 1994, thirteen days short of his 56th birthday.

== World Record ==
Joginder Singh Rao equalled Charlie Parker's world record of three hat-tricks in a single first-class season. He achieved this in 1963–64, around 40 years after Parker. His record was later equalled by Dean Headley who achieved this feat in 1996.
