= M. Suresh Kumar =

Indian cricketer (1973–2020)

Personal information
- Full name: Mani Suresh Kumar
- Born: 19 April 1973; Alleppey, Kerala, India
- Died: 9 October 2020 (aged 47); Alappuzha, India
- Nickname: Umri
- Batting: Left-handed
- Bowling: Slow Left-arm orthodox
- Role: Bowler

Domestic team information
- Years: Team
- 1991–1995: Kerala
- 1995–2000: Railways
- 2001–2005: Kerala

Career statistics
Competition	FC	List A
Matches	72	51
Runs scored	1657	433
Batting average	19.49	13.53
100s/50s	1/7	0/1
Top score	101*	75
Balls bowled	13211	2227
Wickets	196	52
Bowling average	27.77	29.90
5 wickets in innings	12	0
10 wickets in match	0	0
Best bowling	6/34	4/65
Catches/stumpings	27/–	22/–
- Source: ESPNcricinfo, 25 October 2016

Mani Suresh Kumar (19 April 1973 – 9 October 2020) was an Indian first-class cricketer who played for Kerala in the Ranji Trophy. He was born in Alleppey, Kerala, India. Kumar has also played for India U-19 under the captaincy of Rahul Dravid against New Zealand U-19 in 1992.

Mani was a left-hand batsman and slow left-arm orthodox bowler. He took a hat-trick in the 1995-96 Ranji Trophy playing for Railways against Rajasthan.

M. Suresh Kumar committed suicide by hanging on 9 October 2020 in Alappuzha.

== Teams ==
- Ranji Trophy: Kerala, Railways
- India U-19 cricket team
- South Zone cricket team

== See also ==
- List of hat-tricks in the Ranji Trophy
