= Ravi Yadav (cricketer) =

Indian cricketer (born 1991)

Personal information
- Full name: Ravi Ramashankar Yadav
- Born: 28 December 1991 (age 34); Firozabad, Uttar Pradesh, India
- Batting: Left-handed
- Bowling: Left arm medium fast

Domestic team information
- Years: Team
- 2019/20: Madhya Pradesh
- 2023/24: Puducherry
- Source: Cricinfo, 27 January 2020

Ravi Ramashankar Yadav (born 28 December 1991) is an Indian cricketer. He made his first-class debut on 27 January 2020, for Madhya Pradesh in the 2019–20 Ranji Trophy. In the match, he became the first bowler to take a hat-trick in his first over on his debut in a first-class cricket match.
