= 1972–73 Ranji Trophy =

- The Ranji Trophy, which the winners get.
- Administrator(s): BCCI
- Cricket format: First-class cricket
- Tournament format(s): League and knockout
- Champions: Bombay (24th title)
- Participants: 24
- Most runs: Chetan Chauhan (Maharashtra) (873)
- Most wickets: S. Venkataraghavan (Tamil Nadu) (58)

The 1972–73 Ranji Trophy was the 39th season of the Ranji Trophy. Bombay won their 15th title in a row defeating Tamil Nadu in the final.

== Highlights ==
- Bombay won their 15th successive Ranji Trophy. This is a record for the national championships in the Test countries. Bombay lost the 1973–74 semifinal to Karnataka on first innings lead.
- 27 wickets fell on the second day of the Bombay – Tamil Nadu final at Chepauk. The match ended on the first ball of the third day
- Ajit Wadekar captained Bombay to the title for the fourth time. He had already captained in the 1968–69, 1969–70 and 1971–72 finals. As of 2017, C. K. Nayudu of Holkar is the only other captain to win four Ranji titles.

== Group stage ==
=== South Zone ===
Team	Pld	W	L	D	T	NR	Pts	Q
Tamil Nadu	4	3	0	1	0	0	28	2.203
Hyderabad	4	2	0	2	0	0	27	1.882
Mysore	4	2	1	1	0	0	21	1.596
Kerala	4	0	3	1	0	0	3	0.324
Andhra	4	0	3	1	0	0	3	0.301

=== North Zone ===
Team	Pld	W	L	D	T	NR	Pts	Q
Delhi	5	4	0	1	0	0	36	1.774
Railways	5	3	1	1	0	0	28	1.089
Punjab	5	1	0	4	0	0	25	1.368
Services	5	2	2	1	0	0	21	1.007
Haryana	5	0	3	2	0	0	10	0.776
Jammu and Kashmir	5	0	4	1	0	0	3	0.469

=== East Zone ===
Team	Pld	W	L	D	T	NR	Pts	Q
Bengal	3	3	0	0	0	0	25	3.838
Bihar	3	2	1	0	0	0	16	1.915
Orissa	3	1	2	0	0	0	8	0.507
Assam	3	0	3	0	0	0	0	0.292

=== West Zone ===
Team	Pld	W	L	D	T	NR	Pts	Q
Maharashtra	4	3	0	1	0	0	29	1.808
Bombay	4	3	0	1	0	0	27	1.968
Gujarat	4	2	2	0	0	0	17	0.770
Baroda	4	0	3	1	0	0	5	0.694
Saurashtra	4	0	3	1	0	0	3	0.624

=== Central Zone ===
Team	Pld	W	L	D	T	NR	Pts	Q
Vidarbha	3	1	0	2	0	0	18	1.257
Madhya Pradesh	3	1	0	2	0	0	16	1.126
Rajasthan	3	0	1	2	0	0	8	1.043
Uttar Pradesh	3	0	1	2	0	0	6	0.657

== Knockout stage ==
Pre-Quarter-finals
3 Mar 1973 – Poona
Maharashtra	560/2d
Vidarbha	250 & 193
3 Mar 1973 – Jamshedpur
Bihar	131 & 149/5
Madhya Pradesh	168

Quarter-finals
23 Mar 1973 – Poona
Maharashtra	547/9d & 8/1
Bengal	254 & 297
16 Mar 1973 – Madras
Tamil Nadu	206 & 124
Railways	132 & 88
24 Mar 1973 – Indore
Madhya Pradesh	214 & 186
Bombay	368 & 36/1
23 Mar 1973 – Hyderabad
Hyderabad	253 & 273
Delhi	136 & 194

Semi-finals
6 Apr 1973 – Poona
Maharashtra	227 & 96
Tamil Nadu	160 & 187
8 Apr 1973 – Bombay
Bombay	471 & 100/2
Hyderabad	339 & 231/7d

Finals
18 Apr 1973 – Madras
Tamil Nadu	80 & 61
Bombay	151 & 113

=== Final ===
18–21 April 1973
Scorecard

Bombay	v	Tamil Nadu (H)
151 (71.5 overs); Ashok Mankad 38; V. V. Kumar 5/48, S. Venkataraghavan 5/60		80 (45.5 overs); Abdul Jabbar 29; Padmakar Shivalkar 8/16
113 (49.3 overs); Sudhir Naik 28*, Ajit Naik 28; B. Kalyanasundaram 4/8		61 (33.1 overs); Abdul Jabbar 28; Padmakar Shivalkar 5/18, Eknath Solkar 5/23

Bombay won by 123 runs
Madras Cricket Club Ground, Madras
Umpires: Sukken Bhattacharya and Har Prasad Sharma

- Bombay won the toss and decided to bat

== Scorecards and averages ==
- CricketArchive
