= Anand Katti =

Indian cricketer (born 1972)

Personal information
- Full name: Anand Katti
- Born: 11 July 1972 (age 54); Belgaum, Karnataka, India
- Batting: Right-handed
- Bowling: Slow Left-arm orthodox
- Role: Bowler

Domestic team information
- Years: Team
- 1996–2009: Karnataka

Career statistics
Competition	FC	List A
Matches	46	28
Runs scored	799	81
Batting average	17.75	9.00
100s/50s	1/2	0/0
Top score	109*	29
Balls bowled	9479	736
Wickets	141	18
Bowling average	25.85	40.88
5 wickets in innings	2	0
10 wickets in match	0	0
Best bowling	7/93	2/23
Catches/stumpings	23/–	-/–
- Source: ESPNcricinfo, 25 October 2016

Anand Katti (born 11 July 1972) is a first-class cricketer who played for Karnataka in the Ranji Trophy. He was born in Belgaum, Karnataka, India.

Anand is a right-hand batsman and Slow Left-arm orthodox bowler. He took a hat-trick in the 1988-89 Ranji Trophy playing for Karnataka against Kerala.

== Teams ==
Ranji Trophy: Karnataka

== See also ==
- List of hat-tricks in the Ranji Trophy
