= B. K. Garudachar =

Indian cricketer

Personal information
- Born: 13 January 1917; Chikmagalur, Mysore
- Died: 26 February 2016 (aged 99); Bengaluru, Karnataka, India
- Batting: Right-handed
- Bowling: Right-arm leg-spin

Domestic team information
- Years: Team
- 1935–1946: Mysore
- 1938–1941: United Provinces
- 1943–1944: Bombay

Career statistics
Competition	First-class
Matches	27
Runs scored	1126
Batting average	29.63
100s/50s	1/7
Top score	164
Balls bowled	4752
Wickets	100
Bowling average	26.20
5 wickets in innings	7
10 wickets in match	3
Best bowling	8/99
Catches/stumpings	20/0
- Source: ESPNcricinfo, 21 January 2020

B. K. Garudachar (13 January 1917 – 26 February 2016) was an Indian first-class cricketer who played for several teams in Indian domestic cricket between 1935 and 1950. He was a right-arm leg-spin bowler who batted right-handed.

== Career ==
Garudachar made his first-class debut in November 1935, playing for Mysore against Madras in the 1935–36 edition of the Ranji Trophy. He made regular Ranji Trophy appearances over the following decade, primarily for Mysore, but also for the United Provinces and Bombay. Playing for the United Provinces against Central India in January 1940, he took 6/30 and 4/59, giving him a maiden first-class ten-wicket haul. For Mysore in the 1941–42 Ranji Trophy, Garudachar took 34 wickets from just four matches, finishing as the competition's leading wicket-taker and helping the team to its only appearance in the tournament final. His season included figures of 6/46 and 5/78 against Hyderabad, 6/56 and 8/99 against Madras, and 5/68 against Bengal.

As a batsman, Garudachar's highest score (and only century) came for Mysore against Holkar in the 1945–46 Ranji Trophy, when he was captaining the team. After Holkar scored 912/8 in its first innings (with five individual centuries), Mysore was bowled out for 190, and made to follow on. Garudachar, who had taken figures of 4/301 from 69 overs as a bowler, then made 164 runs in just over four hours, helping his team to 509/6 at the end of the final day. The match was his final Ranji Trophy appearance, but his last first-class match was in October 1950, when he appeared for the Cricket Club of India against a touring Commonwealth XI.

After retiring from playing, Garudachar remained involved in administrative roles with the Mysore State Cricket Association. He worked as an engineer, having graduated from the Benares Engineering College.

Garudachar died in Bengaluru in February 2016, aged 99. At the time of his death, he was believed to be the oldest living Indian first-class cricketer.
