= Ramnath Paul =

Indian cricketer (born 1942)

Personal information
- Full name: Ramnath Paul
- Born: 20 March 1942; India
- Batting: Right-handed
- Bowling: Right-arm fast-medium
- Role: Batsman

Career statistics
Competition	First-class
Matches	17
Runs scored	286
Batting average	11.91
100s/50s	0/1
Top score	53
Balls bowled	2,071
Wickets	35
Bowling average	30.00
5 wickets in innings	1
10 wickets in match	0
Best bowling	6/41
Catches/stumpings	5/–
- Source: ESPNcricinfo, 25 March 2019

Ramnath Paul (born 20 March 1942) was an Indian cricketer from Northern Punjab. He was a right-handed batsman and played first-class cricket for nearly five years.

== First-class career ==
Paul made his First-class cricket debut in the 1963–64 season and played his last match in 1967–68. He played for Northern Punjab from 1963/64-1967/68 in Ranji Trophy. He also played for Indian Scarlets in 1967/1968. During 1963-64 Ranji Trophy he played against Joginder Rao, who in that game became the only bowler to take 3 hat-tricks in his first 2 First-class matches.
