= Pritam Gandhe =

Indian cricketer (born 1971)

Personal information
- Born: 6 August 1971 (age 55); Nagpur, Maharashtra
- Batting: Right-handed
- Bowling: Right-arm off-break
- Role: All-rounder

Domestic team information
- Years: Team
- 1987/88 - 2008: Vidarbha

Career statistics
Competition	First-class	List A	T20
Matches	100	73	3
Runs scored	1,869	380	18
Batting average	14.05	8.44	9.00
100s/50s	0/4	0/0	0/0
Top score	81	32	13
Balls bowled	23,243	3,633	54
Wickets	340	63	0
Bowling average	29.47	38.82	-
5 wickets in innings	19	0	0
10 wickets in match	4	0	0
Best bowling	8/61	4/49	-
Catches/stumpings	42/-	16/-	0/-
- Source: , August 2026

Pritam Vithal Gandhe (born 6 August 1971) is a former Indian cricketer. He debuted in 1987–88 and was a right-arm off-break bowler, with over 300 wickets for Vidarbha to his name. He was the captain of the Vidarbha in Ranji Trophy.

He retired from first-class cricket on 30 June 2009, after being in the sport for 21 years.
