= KeKi =

Kemijärven Kiekko
- City: Kemijärvi, Finland
- League: 2. Divisioona
- Founded: 1978
- Home arena: Virta-Areena
- Colours: black and yellow
- Head coach: Kai Puonti

Kemijärven Kiekko (KeKi) is a Finnish ice hockey club from Kemijärvi. The club was founded in 1978, and currently plays in the 2. Divisioona.

== History ==
Until the beginning of 1983, ice hockey in Kemijärvi was played on natural ice. Then, a pneumatic hall was built in place of the current ice rink. In 2000, the current permanent building replaced the former pneumatic hall, owned by Kemijärvi Ice Hall Ltd, in which KeKi is a minority shareholder.

In February 2010, during a match between Kuusamon Pallo-Karhut and KeKi, player Dmitry Korovin gained attention by accumulating a record-breaking 127 penalty minutes. According to witnesses, Korovin allegedly struck the referee, threw his mouthguard at him, and made international hand gestures.
