= Raju Bhatt =

Indian cricketer

Personal information
- Died: 24 August 2006
- Role: wicket-keeper

Domestic team information
- Years: Team
- Baroda

Career statistics
Competition	FC
Matches	17
Runs scored	465
Batting average	17.22
100s/50s	0/
Top score	60
Catches/stumpings	32/6

Raju Bhatt (full name Rajendra Ramprasad Bhatt; died 24 August 2006) was an Indian cricketer. He was a right-handed batsman and wicket-keeper who played for Baroda. He was born in Baroda.

== Career ==
Bhatt made his cricketing debut for Baroda Schools in 1957–58, playing further matches for West Zone Schools and Maharaja Sayajirao University of Baroda prior to his first-class debut.

Bhatt made his first-class debut during the 1961–62 season, against Bombay. He played two matches in the 1961-62 Ranji Trophy.

In the next season, he made a top score of 43 runs, though he weakened in 1963–64, making a top score of 8 runs.

His top score came during his penultimate season, 1965–66, his only first-class half-century, against Gujarat - coming eleven months after a half-century for Baroda University.

Bhatt had to wait over a year for his final two first-class appearances, the last of which finished in an innings defeat for the side.
