= Aditya Mohite =

American professor of engineering

- Occupation: Engineer

Academic background
- Education: Maharaja Sayajirao University (BS,MS,); University of Louisville (PhD)

Aditya Mohite is a professor of chemical and biomolecular engineering at Rice University, known for his research in materials science, particularly in the areas of perovskite solar cells and nanomaterials.

== Early life and education ==
Mohite earned his Ph.D. in physics from the University of Louisville. Prior to that, he obtained his M.S. in Solid State Physics from Maharaja Sayajirao University, Baroda, India, in 2001, and his B.S. in physics from the same institution in 1999. He later conducted research at institutions such as Los Alamos National Laboratory before joining Rice University in 2018.

== Career and research ==
At Rice University, Mohite leads a research group focused on the development of advanced materials for energy applications, including photovoltaics, optoelectronics, and quantum materials. His work has contributed to advancements in the efficiency and stability of perovskite-based solar cells. His research encompasses the study of low-dimensional materials, charge transport mechanisms, and the integration of nanomaterials in energy devices.

Mohite is particularly interested in understanding and controlling photo-physical processes occurring at the interfaces created with layered 2D materials, as well as organic and inorganic materials for thin-film light-to-energy conversion technologies such as photovoltaics and photocatalysis. He also applies correlated interface-sensitive techniques such as photocurrent, time-resolved photoluminescence (PL), electro-absorption, and impedance spectroscopy to investigate charge and energy transfer and recombination processes.

Mohite is the co-founder and chief scientific officer of DirectH2, a company focused on developing modular green hydrogen technologies for sustainable energy solutions and a steering committee member of the Rice Advanced Materials Institute.

== Awards ==
- 2017: Resonate Resnick Award for Sustainability Research
- 2022: Outstanding Faculty Research Award
- 2022: US Department of Energy Hydrogen Program Research & Development Award
- 2024: Provost's Award for Outstanding Faculty Achievement
