= Sunit Singh =

Indian cricketer (born 1983)

Sunit Singh (born 14 April 1983) is an Indian cricketer. He is a right-handed batsman and a right-arm medium-fast bowler who plays for Baroda. He was born in Khaghunpur.

Singh began his career in 2005, playing for the Baroda Under-22s team in the 2004-05 CK Nayudu Trophy. He made his first-class debut in the 2005-06 Ranji Trophy competition, playing against Uttar Pradesh. Singh picked up the first wicket of the match and the first of his career in the seventh over. Then, batting at the tail, he briefly partnered Jacob Martin, who singlehandedly added 251 to the team's score in an innings victory for the team.

Despite not playing in the Ranji Trophy in 2006–07, he returned for the following year's competition, taking three wickets and taking one catch against Hyderabad in November 2007. Singh made his first-class top score in Baroda's penultimate match of the competition, scoring 32 runs in partnership with Sankalp Vora, who made 56 not out.

Singh has most recently played in the 2007-08 Vijay Hazare Trophy, partnering Vora and Pragnesh Patel at the tail.
