= Gundibail Sunderam =

Indian cricketer

Personal information
- Full name: Gundibail Rama Sunderam
- Born: 29 March 1930; Udupi, British India
- Died: 20 June 2010 (aged 80); Mumbai, Maharashtra, India
- Batting: Right-handed
- Bowling: Right-arm fast-medium

International information
- National side: India
- Test debut (cap 81): 16 December 1955 v New Zealand
- Last Test: 28 December 1955 v New Zealand

Career statistics
Competition	Test	First-class
Matches	2	47
Runs scored	3	558
Batting average	–	14.68
100s/50s	0/0	0/0
Top score	3*	52
Balls bowled	396	6,940
Wickets	3	127
Bowling average	55.33	26.10
5 wickets in innings	0	3
10 wickets in match	0	1
Best bowling	2/46	6/64
Catches/stumpings	0/–	23/–
- Source: ESPNcricinfo, 20 November 2022

Gundibail Rama Sunderam (29 March 1930 – 20 June 2010) was an Indian cricketer who played in two Test matches in 1955.

Sunderam was a right-arm fast-medium bowler and a right-handed batsman. He underwent training in the cricket school run by Alf Gover in 1953. He represented India in the unofficial 'Test' against the Silver Jubilee Overseas Cricket team later that year before appearing in Ranji matches.

His two Test matches were against New Zealand in 1955–56. He took one of the two wickets when New Zealand made 450 for 2 in the Delhi Test and two more wickets in the next one. But the presence of medium pacers like G. S. Ramchand and Dattu Phadkar, who were much better batsmen, limited his chances.

Sunderam represented Bombay and Rajasthan in the Ranji Trophy. His son Pradeep Sunderam opened the bowling for Rajasthan in the 1980s and once took 10 wickets in an innings.

Sunderam was born to a Billava (Poojary) family in Udipi in Southern Karnataka .

Sunderam died 20 June 2010 in Mumbai aged 80.
