= Jehangir Khot =

Indian cricketer (1913–1990)

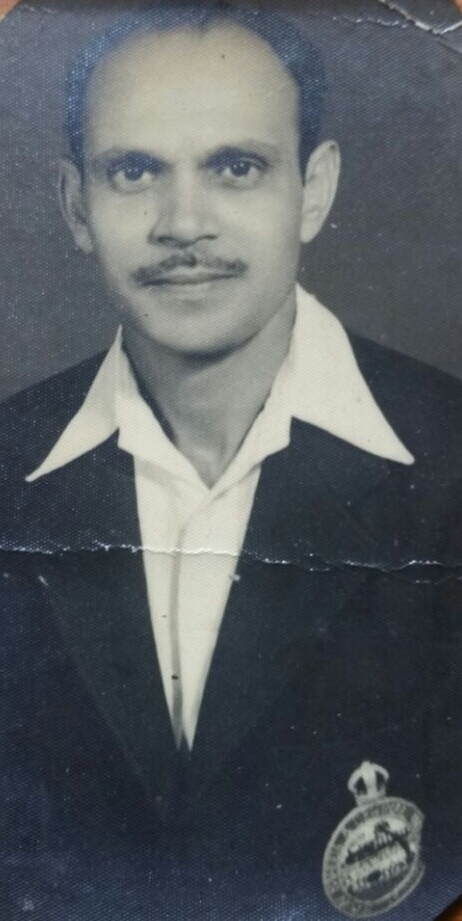

Personal information
- Full name: Jehangir Behramji Khot
- Born: 1 July 1913; Saronda, Bombay Presidency, British India
- Died: 24 March 1990 (aged 77); Bombay, India
- Batting: Right-handed
- Bowling: Right-arm off-break

Domestic team information
- Years: Team
- 1935–1946: Parsees
- 1935–1951: Western India
- 1958–1959: Railways

Career statistics
Competition	First-class
Matches	38
Runs scored	5,660
Batting average	29.06
100s/50s	2/7
Top score	103*
Balls bowled	5,660
Wickets	77
Bowling average	27.01
5 wickets in innings	4
10 wickets in match	2
Best bowling	6/19
Catches/stumpings	23/–
- Source: CricketArchive

Jehangir Khot was born on (1 July 1913 – 24 March 1990). He was a Right-hand batsman and Right-arm off-break bowler. Played first-class cricket in the early 1900s who competed for Bombay in the Ranji Trophy. An all-rounder, Jehangir Khot also represented Parsees (Parsi) /ˈpɑːrsiː/ and Railways.

He took a hat-trick in the 1943–44 Ranji Trophy playing for Bombay against Baroda. He became the first bowler to take five wicket haul in each innings of a Ranji Trophy final when he did this feat for Mumbai against Mysore in the 1941–42 season.

== Teams ==
Main FC Cricket: Parsees (1935/36–1945/46); Bombay (1935/36–1950/51): Railways (India) (1958/59)

Other FC Cricket: Dr. C R Pereira's XI (1946/47); MK Mantri's XI (1947/48)

Ranji Trophy: Bombay (1935/36–1950/51); Railways (India) (1958/59)

== Personal life ==
Jehangir Behramji Khot, son of Behramji Ratanji Khot & Cooverbai Behramji Khot. Married to Kati Mehta, had a son Behramji Jehangir Khot. After the death of his wife Kati Mehta, Jehangir Khot married to Banoo Khodaiji.

He died in Bombay (now Mumbai), Maharashtra, India on 26 March 1990.

== See also ==
- List of hat-tricks in the Ranji Trophy
