= Abdul Jabbar (Tamil Nadu cricketer) =

Indian cricketer (born 1952)

Abdul Jabbar (born 18 April 1952 in Hyderabad) is a former Tamil Nadu cricketer. In a 15-year career, he scored more than 4000 runs in first-class cricket.
