= Vinit Wadkar =

Indian cricketer

Personal information
- Full name: Vinit Sharadchandra Wadkar
- Born: 4 February 1955 (age 71); Bombay, Maharashtra, India
- Batting: Right-handed
- Bowling: Right-arm fast-medium
- Role: Bowler

Domestic team information
- Years: Team
- 1978/79–1988/89: Baroda

Career statistics
Competition	FC	List A
Matches	35	4
Runs scored	635	16
Batting average	17.16	8.00
100s/50s	0/3	0/0
Top score	66	15
Balls bowled	4,025	174
Wickets	71	5
Bowling average	33.97	23.60
5 wickets in innings	1	0
10 wickets in match	0	n/a
Best bowling	5/89	2/45
Catches/stumpings	8/–	2/–
- Source: ESPNcricinfo, 7 March 2016

Vinit Sharadchandra Wadkar (born 4 February 1955) is an Indian former first-class cricketer who represented Baroda cricket team from 1978/79 to 1988/89. After retirement, he became a coach for the Baroda Cricket Association.

== Career ==
Born on 4 February 1955 in Bombay, Wadkar played first-class cricket as a right-arm fast-medium bowler for Baroda. He appeared in a total of 35 first-class and 4 List A matches between the 1978/79 and 1988/89 seasons. He also represented West Zone in 1980/81.

Wadkar took up various coaching roles after his playing career. He was the coach of the Baroda team in early-2000s. Baroda won the 2000–01 Ranji Trophy during his tenure. He also worked as the manager of the Baroda senior team, before working as the coach of Baroda under-22 and under-19 teams of the Baroda Cricket Association.
