= T. A. Sekhar =

Indian cricketer (born 1956)

Personal information
- Full name: Thirumalai Ananthanpillai Sekhar
- Born: 28 March 1956 (age 70); Madras, Madras State, India
- Batting: Right-handed
- Bowling: Right-arm fast-medium

International information
- National side: India
- Test debut (cap 163): 23 January 1983 v Pakistan
- Last Test: 30 January 1983 v Pakistan
- ODI debut (cap 44): 21 January 1983 v Pakistan
- Last ODI: 27 January 1985 v England

Career statistics
Competition	Test	ODIs	FC
Matches	2	4	44
Runs scored	0	–	495
Batting average	–	–	14.14
100s/50s	0/0	0/0	0/1
Top score	0*	–	58
Balls bowled	204	156	6,070
Wickets	0	5	130
Bowling average	–	25.60	27.73
5 wickets in innings	–	0	7
10 wickets in match	–	0	2
Best bowling	–	3/23	9/54
Catches/stumpings	0/–	0/–	19/–
- Source: Cricinfo, 30 April 2026

Thirumalai Ananthanpillai Sekhar (born 28 March 1956 in Madras) is a former fast bowler who represented India in Test cricket and One Day Internationals.

Sekhar was one of the fastest bowlers in India in the early eighties. His two Test matches were in the 1982–83 season when he was flown out to Pakistan to replace the injured Madan Lal. He did not take a wicket in either match. He played a One Day International in that series and three more against England two years later.

Sekhar played for Tamil Nadu between 1976/77 and 1987/88 taking 74 wickets. His career best effort was 9 for 54 against Kerala in 1982/83. He played for Madhya Pradesh for two seasons before bowing out of the game.

Since then his major contribution to Indian cricket was as a bowling coach at the MRF Pace Foundation in Chennai where he was chief coach for several years, working with leading pace bowlers from across the world. He also served as South Zone representative on the National Selection Committee for a period of time. He was later appointed as a talent scout for Mumbai Indians.
