= Viresh Dhaiber =

Indian cricketer

Viresh Dhaiber (details unknown) was an Indian cricketer who played for Baroda.

Dhaiber made a single first-class appearance for the team in the 1981–82 season against Gujarat. Battling from the middle of the order, he scored 14 not out in the only innings in which he batted.

Baroda won the match by an innings margin, as Gujarat were bowled out in their second innings for a mere 50 runs.
