= 2001–02 Ranji Trophy =

68th Ranji Trophy

- The Ranji Trophy, which the winners receive
- Administrator: BCCI
- Cricket format: First-class cricket
- Tournament format(s): League and knockout
- Champions: Railways (1st title)
- Participants: 27
- Most runs: Amit Pagnis (Railways) (800)
- Most wickets: Utpal Chatterjee (Bengal) (39)

The 2001–02 Ranji Trophy was the 68th season of the Ranji Trophy. Baroda and Railways played the final again but Railways won their first Ranji title.

This was the last season played under the zonal format.

== Zonal stage ==
Central Zone

Team	Pld	W	L	D	A	Pts
Railways	4	2	0	2	0	26
Uttar Pradesh	4	2	1	1	0	19
Rajasthan	4	1	1	2	0	16
Madhya Pradesh	4	0	1	3	0	13
Vidarbha	4	0	2	2	0	8

- Top three teams advanced to the knockout stage.

East Zone

Team	Pld	W	L	D	A	Pts
Bengal	4	3	0	0	1	27
Orissa	4	3	0	0	1	27
Assam	4	0	2	2	0	10
Bihar	4	0	2	2	0	8
Tripura	4	0	2	2	0	6

- Top three teams advanced to the knockout stage.

North Zone

Team	Pld	W	L	D	A	Pts
Delhi	5	3	0	2	0	34
Punjab	5	2	0	3	0	27
Himachal Pradesh	5	2	1	2	0	24
Haryana	5	1	1	3	0	19
Jammu & Kashmir	5	0	3	2	0	10
Services	5	0	3	2	0	6

- Top three teams advanced to the knockout stage.

West Zone

Team	Pld	W	L	D	A	Pts
Mumbai	4	3	0	1	0	23
Baroda	4	2	2	0	0	16
Gujarat	4	1	1	2	0	16
Saurashtra	4	0	1	3	0	11
Maharashtra	4	0	2	2	0	8

- Top three teams advanced to the knockout stage.

South Zone

Team	Pld	W	L	D	A	Pts
Andhra	5	1	0	4	0	28
Tamil Nadu	5	1	0	4	0	26
Hyderabad	5	1	0	4	0	24
Karnataka	5	2	1	2	0	22
Goa	5	1	2	2	0	14
Kerala	5	0	3	2	0	6

- Top three teams advanced to the knockout stage.

== Knockout stage ==
The draw for the quarter-finals were made after the final zonal-stage match, with the following fixtures announced. The fixtures in the knockout stage of the tournament are played across five days, instead of four days in the zonal stage.

Round of 16
SZ2	Tamil Nadu	182 & 272
WZ1	Mumbai	186 & 129
CZ1	Railways	497 & 314/4
NZ1	Delhi	395
CZ3	Rajasthan	321 & 146
EZ1	Bengal	518
WZ3	Gujarat	499 & 175/8
SZ1	Andhra	456
NZ3	Himachal Pradesh	192 & 238
SZ3	Hyderabad	403 & 31/0
WZ2	Baroda (Note: Baroda got bye in Round of 16 on the virtue of winning 2000–01 Ranji Trophy.)
bye
EZ3	Assam	170 & 200
NZ2	Punjab	357 & 15/0
CZ2	Uttar Pradesh	231 & 369/9d
EZ2	Orissa	320 & 284/7

Quarterfinals
SZ2	Tamil Nadu	276 & 326/6d
CZ1	Railways	423 & 180/2
EZ1	Bengal	353 & 483/6d
WZ3	Gujarat	321 & 69/5
SZ3	Hyderabad	290 & 127
WZ2	Baroda	673
NZ2	Punjab	207 & 460
EZ2	Orissa	205 & 219

Semifinals
CZ1	Railways	557 & 380/3d
EZ1	Bengal	325
WZ2	Baroda	222 & 233
NZ2	Punjab	237 & 82

Final
CZ1	Railways	253 & 306
WZ2	Baroda	169 & 113

== Final ==
6–10 March 2002
Scorecard

Railways	v	Baroda
253 (82.4 overs); Jai Prakash Yadav 84 (170); Ajit Bhoite 3/52 (20 overs)		169 (74 overs); Satyajit Parab 53 (78); Murali Kartik 5/51 (22 overs)
306 (107.4 overs); Murali Kartik 69 (127); Tushar Arothe 3/49 (10 overs)		113 (36.3 overs); Atul Bedade 59 (73); Murali Karthik 3/7 (6 overs)

Railways won by 277 runs
Karnail Singh Stadium, Delhi
Umpires: Arani Jayaprakash, Francis Gomes

- Railways won the toss and decided to bat

== Scorecards and averages ==
- CricketArchive
