= Raja Ali (cricketer) =

Indian cricketer (1976–2012)

Personal information
- Born: 5 July 1976; Bhopal, Madhya Pradesh, India
- Died: 21 October 2012 (aged 36); Bhopal, Madhya Pradesh, India
- Source: Cricinfo, 23 June 2016

Raja Ali (5 July 1976 – 21 October 2012) was an Indian cricketer. He played first-class cricket for Madhya Pradesh and Railways between 1996 and 2008. He died of cardiac arrest.
