= Tony Fernandes (cricketer) =

Indian cricketer (1945–2015)

- Fernandes in Tasmania in 1973

Personal information
- Full name: Anthony Longinus Fernandes
- Born: 8 April 1945; Baroda, Baroda State, British India
- Died: 19 December 2015 (aged 70); Mumbai, Maharashtra, India
- Batting: Right-handed
- Bowling: Right-arm medium-fast
- Role: All-rounder

Domestic team information
- Years: Team
- 1962–63 to 1973–74: Baroda
- 1966–67 to 1969–70: West Zone

Career statistics
Competition	First-class
Matches	48
Runs scored	1526
Batting average	24.22
100s/50s	0/10
Top score	65*
Balls bowled	6043
Wickets	100
Bowling average	31.78
5 wickets in innings	3
10 wickets in match	0
Best bowling	6/41
Catches/stumpings	19/–
- Source: Cricinfo, 14 January 2024

Anthony Longinus Fernandes (8 April 1945 – 19 December 2015) was an Indian cricketer who played first-class cricket for Baroda and West Zone from 1962 to 1973.

== Biography ==
Fernandes was a tall all-rounder: a right-handed middle-order batsman and a right-arm medium-fast swing bowler who usually opened the bowling. His best bowling figures were 6 for 41 for Baroda against Maharashtra in the 1968–69 Ranji Trophy. The highest of his 10 first-class fifties was 65 not out, also against Maharashtra, in 1971–72, when he also took 5 for 65 in Maharashtra's first innings.

Fernandes was a member of the West Zone teams that won the Duleep Trophy in 1968–69 and 1969–70. He and his brother Leslie, a wicketkeeper, combined to dismiss Sunil Gavaskar caught behind in a Ranji Trophy match in 1972–73.

After his first-class playing career ended, Fernandes spent some time coaching in Tasmania. He died in Mumbai in 2015.
