= Keki Tarapore =

Indian cricketer (1910–1986)

Personal information
- Full name: Keki Khurshedji Tarapore
- Born: 17 December 1910; Bombay, British India
- Died: 15 June 1986 (aged 75); Pune, Maharashtra, India
- Batting: Right-handed
- Bowling: Slow left-arm orthodox

International information
- National side: India
- Only Test (cap 46): 10 November 1948 v West Indies

Career statistics
Competition	Test	First-class
Matches	1	40
Runs scored	2	441
Batting average	2.00	11.30
100s/50s	0/0	0/0
Top score	2	42
Balls bowled	114	10,847
Wickets	0	148
Bowling average	–	28.77
5 wickets in innings	–	5
10 wickets in match	–	0
Best bowling	–	8/91
Catches/stumpings	0/–	16/–
- Source: ESPNcricinfo, 20 November 2022

Keki Khurshedji Tarapore (17 December 1910 – 15 June 1986) was an Indian cricketer who played in one Test match in 1948, and a cricket administrator.

Tarapore studied at Harda New High School and Elphinstone College, Bombay and captained both. He completed a degree in B.A. Started his first class career in 1937 for Parsees and Bombay. A left arm spinner, he was noted for his accuracy. He was reputed to be able to keep even C. K. Nayudu quiet.

Tarapore played as the understudy to Vinoo Mankad, the first of the three or four such left arm spinners, against West Indies in 1948–49. His short international career was thus described by Sujit Mukherjee:

The earliest experiment – a hapless guinea-pig – was greyed Keki Tarapore who was thrust into whirling West Indian blades in the Delhi Test of 1948. Only three wickets fell to Indian bowlers on each of the first two days and Tarapore was conspicuously innocent of them all; so the mammoth crowd diverted itself by tormenting the poor man who at thirty eight (his first class career dated back to the (first) Pentangular), was not the most agile man in the field.

While fielding at deep extra cover on the second day in this match, Tarapore injured his fingers while trying to stop a four hit by Robert Christiani off Vinoo Mankad. He had to leave the field, and when he came back, the crowd barracked him every time he touched the ball.

Four months after his only Test, Tarapore played his last first class match – the Ranji final between Bombay and Baroda – where he bowled 99 overs.

Tarapore later went into cricket administration. He managed the Indian teams to England in 1967 and West Indies in 1970–71. He served as the secretary of Cricket Club of India from 1954 to 1982. Marylebone Cricket Club elected him as an honorary member in 1974.

Kapil Dev credited Tarapore with inspiring him with a remark when he was a teenager attending an under-19 coaching camp. When Kapil complained that the two chapatis given to him for lunch was insufficient as he was a fast bowler, Tarapore laughed at him and said that there were no fast bowlers in India. After he became a successful Test cricketer, Kapil sought Tarapore out at a function for giving him "a goal in life by almost challenging me to bowl fast".

Tarapore died in the Ruby Nursing Home in Pune after being knocked down by a moped.

== Notes ==
- There are two Keki Tarapores in Indian cricket. The other Tarapore (1922–2001) was better known as a coach. He was based in Bangalore and mentored many Karnataka juniors some of whom went on to play for India.
