= B. Kalyanasundaram =

Indian former first-class cricketer (born 1947)

Personal information
- Full name: Balasubramoniam Kalyanasundaram
- Born: 12 August 1947 (age 79); Kumbakonam, Tamil Nadu, India
- Nickname: Kalli
- Batting: Right-handed
- Bowling: Right-arm medium-fast
- Role: Bowler

Domestic team information
- Years: Team
- 1966/67–1967/68: Kerala
- 1968/69–1977/78: Tamil Nadu

Career statistics
Competition	FC
Matches	51
Runs scored	337
Batting average	8.64
100s/50s	0/0
Top score	31*
Balls bowled	6,066
Wickets	147
Bowling average	20.09
5 wickets in innings	7
10 wickets in match	1
Best bowling	6/47
Catches/stumpings	15/–
- Source: ESPNcricinfo, 1 March 2016

B. Kalyanasundaram (born 12 August 1947) is an Indian former first-class cricketer who represented Tamil Nadu and Kerala. He later worked as a selector for Tamil Nadu Cricket Association and the director of Chennai Super Kings Ltd.

== Life and career ==
Kalyanasundaram was born on 12 August 1947 in Kumbakonam, Thanjavur district. A right-arm medium pace bowler, he began his career with Kerala in the 1966/67 season. He took a ten-wicket haul in his third first-class match, with figures of 4/49 and 6/58 against Hyderabad. He switched to his home state team Tamil Nadu two seasons later and represented it for ten years. He was part of the Tamil Nadu team that finished runners-up in the 1972–73 Ranji Trophy. He took a hat-trick in the final against Bombay, becoming the first bowler to take a hat-trick in a Ranji final. He appeared in a total of 51 first-class matches and took 147 wickets at an average of 20.

Kalyanasundaram became a selector for Tamil Nadu Cricket Association after his playing career. He worked as the chairman of the under-17 and under-19 selection panel, before becoming the chairman of selectors of the senior team in 2009. He was replaced at the position in 2014 by Sridharan Sharath. In 2015, he was appointed as the director of the Chennai Super Kings Ltd. Between 2009 and 2013, he had also worked as a match referee in domestic cricket matches.
