= 1989–90 Ranji Trophy =

- The Ranji Trophy, which the winners get.
- Administrator: BCCI
- Cricket format: First-class cricket
- Tournament format(s): League and knockout
- Champions: Bengal (2nd title)
- Participants: 27
- Most runs: M. V. Sridhar (Hyderabad) (729)
- Most wickets: Atul Wassan (Delhi) (39)

The 1989–90 Ranji Trophy was the 56th season of the Ranji Trophy. Bengal won a rain interrupted final against Delhi on run quotient.

== Group stage ==
=== North Zone ===
Team	Pld	W	L	D	T	NR	Pts	Q
Delhi	5	2	0	3	0	0	83	2.387
Punjab	5	2	0	3	0	0	73	1.506
Haryana	5	3	0	2	0	0	72	1.227
Jammu and Kashmir	5	1	2	2	0	0	50	0.699
Services	5	0	3	2	0	0	46	0.672
Himachal Pradesh	5	0	3	2	0	0	27	0.530

=== Central Zone ===
Team	Pld	W	L	D	T	NR	Pts	Q
Uttar Pradesh	4	2	0	2	0	0	61	1.567
Madhya Pradesh	4	1	0	3	0	0	55	1.173
Railways	4	0	0	4	0	0	47	1.440
Rajasthan	4	1	2	1	0	0	32	0.682
Vidarbha	4	0	2	2	0	0	28	0.669

=== East Zone ===
Team	Pld	W	L	D	T	NR	Pts	Q
Bengal	4	1	0	3	0	0	61	2.337
Bihar	4	2	0	2	0	0	60	1.449
Orissa	4	1	0	3	0	0	59	1.338
Assam	4	0	2	2	0	0	28	0.615
Tripura	4	0	2	2	0	0	16	0.399

=== South Zone ===
Team	Pld	W	L	D	T	NR	Pts	Q
Karnataka	5	3	0	2	0	0	87	1.545
Hyderabad	5	1	0	4	0	0	81	1.825
Tamil Nadu	5	2	0	3	0	0	79	1.993
Kerala	5	1	1	3	0	0	50	0.690
Andhra	5	0	2	3	0	0	37	0.566
Goa	5	0	4	1	0	0	27	0.412

=== West Zone ===
Team	Pld	W	L	D	T	NR	Pts	Q
Bombay	4	0	0	4	0	0	49	1.493
Baroda	4	0	0	4	0	0	46	1.491
Maharashtra	4	0	0	4	0	0	40	0.905
Gujarat	4	0	0	4	0	0	40	0.658
Saurashtra	4	0	0	4	0	0	33	0.757

== Knockout stage ==
Pre-Quarter-finals
8 Feb 1990 — Bombay
Bombay	636
Madhya Pradesh	394 & 199
8 Feb 1990 — Jamshedpur
Bihar (F)	567
Karnataka	274 & 170/4

Quarter-finals
16 Feb 1990 — Secunderabad
Hyderabad (F)	416 & 234
Punjab	203 & 177/3
16 Feb 1990 — Calcutta
Bengal (Q)	312/2
Bombay	590/5d
16 Feb 1990 — Baroda
Baroda	320 & 275/7
Uttar Pradesh	405 & 189
16 Feb 1990 — Delhi
Delhi (F)	264/8
Bihar	249

Semi-finals
2 Mar 1990 — Secunderabad
Hyderabad	417
Bengal (F)	539/8d & 81/1
2 Mar 1990 — Baroda
Baroda	234 & 225/4
Delhi (F)	560

Finals
23 Mar 1990 — Calcutta
Bengal (Q)	216/4
Delhi	278

(F) – Advanced to next round on First Innings Lead.
(Q) – Advanced to next round/won the final on better Quotient.

=== Final ===
22–28 March 1990
Scorecard

Delhi	v	Bengal (H)
278 (100.4 overs); Kirti Azad 93 (242); Rajiv Seth 3/73 (25 overs)		216/4 (63.4 overs); Arun Lal 52*; Manoj Prabhakar 2/42 (19 overs)

Match drawn (Bengal won on runs per wicket)
Eden Gardens, Calcutta
Umpires: R. S. Rathore and Piloo Reporter

- Delhi won the toss and decided to bat.
- Sourav Ganguly (Bengal) made his first class debut.

== Scorecards and averages ==
- CricketArchive
