= Salim Veragi =

Indian cricketer (born 1986)

Salim Veragi (born 28 July 1986) is an Indian cricketer. He is a right-handed batsman and a right-arm medium-pace bowler who plays for Baroda. He was born in Tankariya.

Veragi made his first-class debut in January 2008, in the Elite Group semi-final of the 2007-08 Ranji Trophy tournament, playing against Delhi. Batting as a tailender, Veragi finished not-out in the first innings, and was caught and bowled by Chetan Nanda in the second innings of the match.
