= Ajit Bhoite =

Indian cricketer (born 1976)

Ajit Prataprao Bhoite (born 9 October 1976 in Baroda, Gujarat) is a former Indian cricketer who played for the Baroda cricket team. He was a right-handed batsman as well as a right-arm offbreak bowler.

Bhoite made his first-class debut for Baroda against Gujarat in 1996-97 and made his List A debut the following season. As well as Baroda he also represented West Zone in the 2001/02 Duleep Trophy. His cricket career ended following the 2006/07 season.
