= Ashok Khanna =

Indian cricketer (born 1945)

Personal information
- Full name: Ashok Khanna
- Born: 26 October 1945; India
- Role: Batsman

Career statistics
Competition	First-class
Matches	16
Runs scored	730
Batting average	27.03
100s/50s	1/0
Top score	136
Catches/stumpings	5/0
- Source: ESPNcricinfo

Ashok Khanna (born 26 October 1945) was an Indian cricketer from Northern Punjab. He was a right-handed batsman and played First-class cricket in India for 5 years.

== First Class Career ==
Khanna made his First-class debut in 1962–63 season and played his last match in 1967–68.
