= K. C. Ibrahim =

Indian cricketer (1919–2007)

Personal information
- Full name: Khanmohammad Cassumbhoy Ibrahim
- Born: 26 January 1919; Bombay, Bombay Presidency, British India
- Died: 12 November 2007 (aged 88); Karachi, Pakistan
- Batting: Right-handed

International information
- National side: India
- Test debut (cap 45): 10 November 1948 v West Indies
- Last Test: 4 February 1949 v West Indies

Career statistics
Competition	Tests	First-class
Matches	4	60
Runs scored	169	4716
Batting average	21.12	61.24
100s/50s	0/1	14/22
Top score	85	250
Balls bowled	0	408
Wickets	-	4
Bowling average	-	46.75
5 wickets in innings	-	-
10 wickets in match	-	-
Best bowling	-	1/2
Catches/stumpings	0/-	15/-
- Source: ESPNcricinfo, 20 December 2020

Khanmohammad Cassumbhoy Ibrahim (26 January 1919 – 12 November 2007) was an Indian cricketer who played in four Tests in the 1948–49 season.

== Cricket career ==
He was born in Bombay and studied in St Xavier's College. He played domestic cricket for Bombay from 1938–39 to 1949–50 as a top-order batsman, occasionally opening the batting. He also played for the Muslims in the Bombay Pentangular. He holds the record for scoring the most first class runs between dismissals: in 1947–48, he compiled successive innings of 218, 36, 234 and 77, all not out, followed by 144, a total of 709 runs between dismissals. Ibrahim is the only player to have carried his bat while scoring a double century in consecutive first-class matches. He scored 1,171 runs that season, at a batting average of 167.29, and was selected as Indian Cricketer of the Year in 1948. He was captain of the Bombay side that won the 1948 Ranji Trophy, scoring 219 in the final.

His career first class batting average of 61.24 is the ninth-highest in history (among those who have batted at least 50 times), but he played only four Tests, against West Indies in 1948–49. Opening the batting with Vinoo Mankad, he scored 85 and 44 in the 1st Test, but made only 40 runs in his next six Test innings.

== Retirement from cricket ==
He suffered from poor health in his later years. He died at his home in Karachi, in Pakistan, aged 88. He was the oldest living Indian Test cricketer at the time of his death.
