= Rajinder Kale =

Indian cricketer (born 1939)

Personal information
- Full name: Rajinder Kumar Kale
- Born: 16 December 1939 (age 86); India
- Role: Wicket-keeper

Career statistics
Competition	First-class
Matches	6
Runs scored	201
Batting average	20.01
100s/50s	0/1
Top score	56
Catches/stumpings	3/3
- Source: ESPNcricinfo, 25 March 2019

Rajinder Kumar Kale (born 16 December 1939) is an Indian former cricketer from Northern Punjab. He was a wicket-keeper batsman and played first-class cricket for nearly five years. Kale made his first-class debut in 1963–64 season and played his last match in 1964–65.
