= Gagandeep Singh (cricketer, born 1981) =

Indian cricketer (born 1981)

Gagandeep Singh (born 3 October 1981 in Ludhiana, Punjab) is an Indian cricketer. He played for Punjab, and Kings XI Punjab in the Indian Premier League. Over a ten-year career, from 1999–00 to 2009–10, he took 266 wickets at an average of 20.84, with 16 five wicket hauls, and three times took ten wickets in a match. He was part of the India squad for a Test series against Bangladesh in 2004, but did not make the final team for any matches.
