= Hiralal Gaekwad =

Indian cricketer (1923–2003)

Personal information
- Full name: Hiralal Ghasulal Gaekwad
- Born: 29 August 1923; Nagpur, British India
- Died: 2 January 2003 (aged 79); Bagdogra, West Bengal, India
- Batting: Left-handed
- Bowling: Slow left-arm orthodox; Left-arm medium

International information
- National side: India
- Only Test (cap 62): 23 October 1952 v Pakistan

Career statistics
Competition	Test	First-class
Matches	1	101
Runs scored	22	2,487
Batting average	11.00	19.42
100s/50s	0/0	2/10
Top score	14	164
Balls bowled	222	26,006
Wickets	0	375
Bowling average	–	23.62
5 wickets in innings	–	21
10 wickets in match	–	5
Best bowling	–	7/67
Catches/stumpings	0/–	43/–
- Source: ESPNcricinfo, 10 September 2022

Hiralal Ghasulal Gaekwad (29 August 1923 – 2 January 2003) was an Indian cricketer who played in one Test match in 1952.
