= 2003–04 Ranji Trophy =

Cricket tournament

- The Ranji Trophy, which the winners get.
- Administrator: BCCI
- Cricket format: First-class cricket
- Tournament format(s): League and knockout
- Champions: Mumbai (36th title)
- Participants: 27
- Most runs: Dheeraj Jadhav (Maharashtra) (1066)
- Most wickets: Narendra Hirwani (Madhya Pradesh) (45)

The 2003–04 Ranji Trophy was the 70th season of the Ranji Trophy. Mumbai defeated Tamil Nadu on first innings lead. Maharashtra won the Plate division title.

Wasim Jaffer of Mumbai took 23 catches in nine matches which is the record for most catches in a season by a fielder.

== Group Matches ==
=== Elite Group ===
Group A

Team	Played	W	L	FL	FD	NR	Bonus	Points
Mumbai	7	3	0	4	0	0	2	22
Railways	7	3	0	1	3	0	0	14
Uttar Pradesh	7	2	1	2	2	0	1	13
Punjab	7	1	0	3	3	0	1	11
Andhra Pradesh	7	1	1	1	3	1	0	6
Delhi	7	0	1	3	2	1	0	6
Baroda	7	0	4	2	1	0	0	4
Kerala	7	0	2	1	4	0	0	2

- Mumbai and Railways qualified for the Elite Group knockout stage.

Group B

Team	Played	W	L	FL	FD	NR	Bonus	Points
Tamil Nadu	6	3	0	1	2	0	1	15
Hyderabad	6	3	1	1	0	1	1	15
Karnataka	6	3	2	1	0	0	1	15
Bengal	6	1	1	2	2	0	1	9
Gujarat	6	2	2	0	2	0	0	8
Assam	6	1	2	1	1	1	0	6
Rajasthan	6	1	5	0	0	0	0	4

- Tamil Nadu and Hyderabad qualified for the Elite Group knockout stage.

== Knockout stage ==
Semifinals
B2	Tamil Nadu	481 & 306
A2	Railways	342 & 117/5
B1	Hyderabad	166 & 158
A1	Mumbai	476

Final
B2	Tamil Nadu	294 & 353/4
A1	Mumbai	613

== Final ==
26–30 March 2004
Scorecard

Tamil Nadu	v	Mumbai
294 (97.2 overs); Dinesh Karthik 109 (136); Nilesh Kulkarni 6/83 (32.2 overs)		613 (200.5 overs); Amol Muzumdar 146 (291); Vidyut Sivaramakrishnan 3/146 (42.5 overs)
353/4 (149 overs); Subramaniam Badrinath 110 (338); Sairaj Bahutule 2/77 (32 overs)

Match drawn
M. A. Chidambaram Stadium, Chennai
Umpires: MS Mahal and SK Porel

- Tamil Nadu on the toss and elected to field.
- Mumbai won the 2003/04 Ranji Trophy through its first innings lead.

== Scorecards and averages ==
- CricketArchive
