= Keki Tarapore (coach) =

Indian cricketer and coach (1922–2001)

Personal information
- Born: 11 October 1911; Indore, India
- Died: 12 July 2001 (aged 89); Bangalore, India
- Batting: Right-handed
- Bowling: Right-arm medium-fast

Career statistics
| Competition | First-class |
|---|---|
| Matches | 1 |
| Runs scored | 8 |
| Batting average | 4.00 |
| 100s/50s | 0/0 |
| Top score | 6 |
| Catches/stumpings | 0/– |
- Source: ESPNcricinfo, 29 January 2014

Keki Bezon Tarapore (11 October 1922 – 12 July 2001), was an Indian cricketer and coach. He coached a number of cricketing greats including Rahul Dravid and Anil Kumble.
