= Amit Pagnis =

Indian cricketer (born 1978)

Amit Anil Pagnis (born 18 September 1978, in Mumbai) is an Indian first-class cricketer. A left-handed batsman, Pagnis has made over 5000 runs in Indian domestic cricket. He captained India in the 1998 Under 19 World Cup in South Africa.

When Australia toured India, he hammered Shane Warne's bowling for 30-ball 50 runs in a warm up match with India. He danced down the pitch on square turning balls and did it. It was done at Sachin Tendulkar's instructions, who was captaining Mumbai team then. It set up India team well on that Aussie tour – premier Aussie bowler was rendered ineffective.
