= Sunil Subramaniam =

Indian cricketer and coach (born 1967)

Personal information
- Full name: Sunil Subramaniam
- Born: 28 May 1967 (age 59); Bombay, Maharashtra, India
- Batting: Right-handed
- Bowling: Slow left-arm orthodox
- Role: Bowler

Domestic team information
- Years: Team
- 1988/89–1997/98: Tamil Nadu
- 2000/01: Assam

Career statistics
Competition	FC	List A
Matches	74	28
Runs scored	1096	119
Batting average	18.57	9.91
100s/50s	0/4	0/0
Top score	68	22
Balls bowled	16510	1309
Wickets	285	33
Bowling average	23.53	28.15
5 wickets in innings	20	2
10 wickets in match	4	n/a
Best bowling	7/44	5/22
Catches/stumpings	35/–	13/–
- Source: ESPNcricinfo, 31 November 2015

Sunil Subramaniam (born 28 May 1967) is a former Indian first-class cricketer and the current head coach of the Tamil Nadu Cricket Association Academy and manager of the Indian national team. During his playing career, Subramaniam represented Tamil Nadu cricket team and Assam cricket team. He took up the job of cricket coaching in 2005.

== Career ==
Subramaniam is a former slow left-arm orthodox spinner who played for Tamil Nadu cricket team for ten seasons from 1988/89 to 1997/98 before getting dropped from the team. He then played one season for Assam cricket team in 2000/01. Despite having a successful first-class career, he was never considered for India selection. He appeared for Rest of India in 1994/95 Irani Trophy against Mumbai.

During his playing career, Subramaniam also worked for the Indian IT company HCL Technologies.

Subramaniam retired from competitive cricket in 2001 at the age of 34. He made the retirement call after tearing a ligament in his left leg during practice following which he underwent two operations. He had two simultaneous injuries at the time of retirement, with blades inserted into both his legs. He was regarded to be among "the most feared bowlers in first class cricket" for his bowling skills and aggressive approach.

In 2005, he became the coach of the Tamil Nadu Cricket Association Academy. He has been the coach of Indian spinner Ravichandran Ashwin since Ashwin's under-19 days at Tamil Nadu.
