= List of Central Zone cricketers =

This is a list of all cricketers who have played first-class or List A cricket for Central Zone cricket team.

Last updated at the end of the 2015/16 season.

== A–F ==
- Abdul Hai
- Madhusudan Acharya
- Haseen Ahmed
- Imtiyaz Ahmed
- Aslam Ali
- Hyder Ali
- Imran Ali
- Raja Ali
- Abbas Ali
- Syed Gulrez Ali
- Syed Mushtaq Ali
- Pravin Amre
- Ibrahim Ansari
- Suhail Ansari
- Anureet Singh
- Chandrashekhar Atram
- Narendra Bagatheria
- Anand Bais
- Ashok Bambi
- Pradeep Banerjee
- Sanjay Bangar
- Sunil Benjamin
- Suthar Bhagwandas
- Bhagwat Singh of Mewar
- Ashok Bhagwat
- Anil Bhanot
- P. Bhave
- Udit Birla
- Rajesh Bishnoi
- Robin Bist
- Devendra Bundela
- Alfred Burrows
- Sunil Chaturvedi
- Rajesh Chauhan
- Vedraj Chauhan
- Piyush Chawla
- Karim Chishti
- Aakash Chopra
- Nikhil Chopra
- Vijay Chopra
- Naresh Churi
- Mukul Dagar
- Madhav Dalvi
- Anup Dave
- Amit Deshpande
- Anil Deshpande
- Dinkar Deshpande
- Nikhil Doru
- Manish Dosi
- Narendra Dua
- Salim Durani
- Vikram Dutt
- Prashant Dwevedi
- Faiz Fazal

== G–L ==
- Hiralal Gaekwad
- Pritam Gandhe
- Ulhas Gandhe
- Kailash Gattani
- Amrish Gautam
- Vikas Gawate
- Shailender Gehlot
- Yogesh Ghare
- Arindam Ghosh
- Yere Goud
- Samir Gujar
- Arjit Gupta
- Praveen Gupta
- Subhash Gupte
- Rajinder Hans
- Hanumant Singh
- Harpreet Singh Bhatia
- Harvinder Singh
- Manzur Hasan
- Laxmi Hazaria
- Praveen Hingnikar
- Narendra Hirwani
- Nazmul Hussain
- Zakir Hussain
- Ashok Jagdale
- Sanjay Jagdale
- Deepak Jain (cricketer)
- Ravi Jangid
- Jaswinder Singh
- Jaswinder Singh
- Rohit Jhalani
- Subhash Jhanji
- C. G. Joshi
- Harshad Joshi
- Siddarth Joshi
- Kamal Juneja
- Mohammad Kaif
- Kishan Kala
- Obaid Kamal
- Hrishikesh Kanitkar
- Rajesh Kanojia
- Rahul Kanwat
- Prakash Karkera
- Murali Kartik
- Kamraj Kesari
- Narsingrao Kesari
- Mehboodullah Khan
- Rafiullah Khan
- Sardar Khan
- Yusuf Ali Khan
- Shashikant Khandkar
- Balbir Khanna
- Shreyas Khanolkar
- Samir Khare
- Balkrishna Kher
- Gagan Khoda
- Prakash Khot
- Amay Khurasiya
- Syed Kirmani
- P. Krishnakumar
- Bhuvneshwar Kumar
- Praveen Kumar
- M. Suresh Kumar
- Sunil Lahore
- Laxman Singh

== M–R ==
- Ghauri Majid
- Manish Majithia
- M. N. Manian
- Vijay Manjrekar
- Vinoo Mankad
- Jacob Martin
- Anil Mathur
- Jaideep Mathur
- Kuldeep Mathur
- Sumit Mathur
- Vinod Mathur
- Ashok Menaria
- Narendra Menon
- Dharmendra Mishra
- Mohnish Mishra
- Rajneesh Mishra
- Mohammad Aslam
- Mohammad Siddique
- Manoj Mudgal
- Sanju Mudkavi
- Ali Murtaza
- K. V. R. Murthy
- Alind Naidu
- Arjun Naidu
- Gopi Naidu
- R. Narasimhan
- Narinder Singh
- Akshdeep Nath
- C. K. Nayudu
- Prakash Nayudu
- Devashish Nilosey
- B. B. Nimbalkar
- Arun Ogiral
- Naman Ojha
- Amit Pagnis
- Gyanendra Pandey
- Ishwar Pandey
- Sanjay Pandey
- Chandrakant Pandit
- Pankaj Singh
- Kulamani Parida
- Parvinder Singh
- Anand Patel
- Kirti Patel
- Urvesh Patel
- Sandeep Patil
- Avash Paul
- Amit Paunikar
- Vinod Pendarkar
- Suhas Phadkar
- Vijay Pimprikar
- Prakash Poddar
- Durga Prasad
- Udamalpet Radhakrishnan
- Syed Rahim
- Suresh Raina
- Anand Rajan
- Murthy Rajan
- Raj Singh Dungarpur
- Khandu Rangnekar
- Sanjeeva Rao
- Ratan Singh
- Rajiv Rathore
- Mahesh Rawat
- Harshad Rawle
- Rituraj Singh
- Kishan Rungta

== S–Z ==
- Himalaya Sagar
- Sudhir Sahu
- Mohammad Saif
- Dhiran Salvi
- Sandeep Singh
- Sanjib Sanyal
- Rahul Sapru
- Chandu Sarwate
- Madhukar Sathe
- Prabhakar Sathe
- Jalaj Saxena
- Jatin Saxena
- Subodh Saxena
- Vineet Saxena
- T. A. Sekhar
- Mohammad Shahid
- Rizwan Shamshad
- Abhay Sharma
- Ankit Sharma
- Gopal Sharma
- Jitesh Sharma
- Karn Sharma
- Kishore Sharma
- Manohar Sharma
- Parthasarathy Sharma
- Rohit Sharma
- Sanjeev Sharma
- Padam Shastri
- Suresh Shastri
- Prasad Shetty
- Shalabh Shrivastava
- Anand Shukla
- Ravikant Shukla
- Saurabh Shukla
- Shivakant Shukla
- R. P. Singh
- R. P. Singh
- Tajinderpal Singh Toor
- Vivek Bhan Singh
- Harvinder Sodhi
- Sampathkumar Srinivasan
- Amkit Srivastava
- Rohit Prakash Srivastava
- Shalabh Srivastava
- Tanmay Srivastava
- TP Sudhindra
- Gundibail Sunderam
- Pradeep Sunderam
- Rusi Surti
- Suryaveer Singh
- Paresh Sutane
- Rakesh Tandon
- Bhalchandra Telang
- Vijay Telang
- Iqbal Thakur
- Krishna Tiwari
- Brijesh Tomar
- Sudeep Tyagi
- Prashant Vaidya
- Rajeswar Vats
- Vipin Vats
- Amitabh Vijayvargiya
- Shrikant Wagh
- Akshay Wakhare
- Ashish Yadav
- Jai Prakash Yadav
- Jyoti Yadav
- Kuldeep Yadav
- Madan Yadav
- Umesh Yadav
- Vijendra Yadav
- Vishal Yadav
- Dishant Yagnik
- Ashish Zaidi
