= List of Uttar Pradesh cricketers =

This is a list of all cricketers who have played first-class, List A or Twenty20 cricket for Uttar Pradesh cricket team. Seasons given are first and last seasons; the player did not necessarily play in all the intervening seasons.

Last updated at the end of the 2019/20 season.

== Key ==
- † preceding a player's name means that the original article is now a redirect to this list. Players in **bold** have played international cricket.

== A ==
- Tahir Abbas, 2006/07–2008/09
- Arif Husain, 2006/07
- Mohammad Abdul Hai, 1976/77–1978/79
- Deepak Agarwal, 1968/69
- Pankaj Agarwal, 1994/95
- Aftab Ahmed, 1952/53–1953/54
- Akhlaq Ahmed, 1973/74–1975/76
- B Ahmed, 1968/69
- Haseen Ahmed, 1971/72–1978/79
- Imtiyaz Ahmed, 2007/08–2015/16
- Sagir Ahmed, 1961/62
- Salim Ahmed, 1987/88
- Suhail Ahmed, 1971/72
- Ajit Singh, 2001/02–2002/03
- J Akhtar, 1969/70
- Arish Alam, 2005/06–2014/15
- Aslam Ali, 1973/74–1978/79
- Fasahat Ali, 1988/89–1990/91
- Hyder Ali, 1963/64–1966/67
- Mushtaq Ali, 1959/60–1972/73
- **Syed Mushtaq Ali**, 1956/57
- Nasir Ali, 2000/01–2001/02
- Zahid Ali, 2010/11–2011/12
- Khurshid Allam, 1958/59–1961/62
- Zamir Alvi, 1952/53
- **Lala Amarnath**, 1954/55
- Javed Anwar, 2001/02–2003/04
- Sekhar Anand, 1981/82–1986/87
- Asad Ansari, 1970/71–1975/76
- Mazhar Ansari, 1984/85–1991/92
- Arvind Singh, 1996/97–1999/00
- Himanshu Asnora, 2014/15–2015/16
- Sharad Athawale, 1955/56–1965/66
- Israr Azim, 2015/16

== B ==
- Shivadhar Bajpai, 1996/97–2001/02
- Vanmali Balaji Rao, 1961/62–1962/63
- R Balasundaram, 1950/51–1952/53
- Ashok Bambi, 1975/76–1986/87
- Sunil Banerjee, 1949/50–1952/53
- Shahnawaz Bhaktiyar, 1993/94
- HD Bhandari, 1956/57–1960/61
- Yogendra Bhandari, 1994/95
- Anil Bhanot, 1973/74–1983/84
- Rajdeep Bharadwaj, 1990/91
- Ram Prakash Bharadwaj, 1970/71–1974/75
- Rajendra Bhargawa, 1960/61
- Ajit Bhatia, 1958/59
- TK Bhattacharya, 1978/79–1984/85
- BR Bhaveja, 1960/61–1962/63
- Bhupinder Singh, 1987/88–1994/95
- Brijender Singh, 1996/97–1999/00

== C ==
- KS Chamanlal, 1969/70–1976/77
- Phool Chand, 1953/54
- Utkarsh Chandra, 2002/03–2006/07
- Chandraprakash, 1997/98
- Charanjit Singh, 1982/83
- GC Chaturvedi, 1949/50–1950/51
- Rohit Chaturvedi, 1959/60–1966/67
- Sunil Chaturvedi, 1979/80–1991/92
- Shubham Chaubey, 2015/16
- Shivam Chaudhary, 2014/15
- Surendrapal Singh Chauhan, 1989/90
- **Piyush Chawla**, 2005/06–2015/16
- Karim Chisty, 1963/64–1974/75
- Amit Chopra, 2011/12
- **Nikhil Chopra**, 2001/02–2003/04
- Vijay Chopra, 1974/75–1983/84
- Rohit Choudhary, 2009/10–2011/12
- atul singh 2017 –2019

== D ==
- Mukul Dagar, 2011/12–2014/15
- Daljit Singh, 1952/53–1954/55
- Vijay Dandekar, 1955/56
- Hasan Dara, 1977/78–1979/80
- MM Das, 1969/70
- TK Das, 1954/55
- Manish Deb, 1953/54
- Nitya Dey, 1971/72–1975/76
- Digvijay Singh, 2010/11–2013/14
- R Divedi, 1971/72
- Satish Dorai, 1994/95–2001/02
- Saurabh Dubey, 2015/16
- Vikram Dutt, 1981/82–1983/84
- Nirmal Dutta, 1959/60–1961/62
- BK Dwarkanath, 1949/50
- Eklavya Dwivedi, 2006/07–2015/16

== E ==
- Rahat Elahi, 2002/03–2008/09

== G ==
- KBL Gaur, 1950/51–1953/54
- Amrish Gautam, 1989/90–1994/95
- Aman Gera, 1994/95–1996/97
- S Ghosh, 1969/70
- Ashok Gupta, 1959/60–1960/61
- Gaurav Shukla, 2018–2020
- Praveen Gupta, 2002/03–2013/14
- Vijay Gupta, 1959/60
- Vinod Gupta, 1962/63–1966/67

== H ==
- Masood Halim, 1962/63–1972/73
- Rajinder Hans, 1976/77–1986/87
- Hament Hardikar, 1973/74–1979/80
- Taqi Hasan, 1965/66
- Awies Hashmi, 1968/69–1969/70
- Laxmi Hazaria, 1959/60–1972/73
- Hashmat Hussain, 1986/87

== I ==
- Indrapal Singh, 1987/88–1992/93

== J ==
- Asif Jaffer, 1997/98
- NP Jagdishan, 1961/62
- Sanjeev Jakhmola, 1997/98–1998/99
- Jasbir Singh, 1992/93–1995/96
- Jasbir Singh, 1968/69–1976/77
- Mohammad Javed, 2015/16
- Kasim Jeeva, 1952/53–1956/57
- Subhash Jhanji, 1955/56–1963/64
- Kamal Juneja, 1970/71–1980/81

== K ==
- **Mohammad Kaif**, 1997/98–2013/14
- Kishan Kala, 1982/83–1985/86
- Obaid Kamal, 1990/91–1999/00
- Kamal Kanojia, 1996/97–1999/00
- Anshul Kapoor, 2002/03–2008/09
- Arvind Kapoor, 1992/93–1993/94
- Neeru Kapoor, 1964/65–1970/71
- Satishchandra Kesherwani, 1988/89–1996/97
- Majid Khalil, 1993/94–1995/96
- † Aaqib Khan, 2020–2025
- Abid Khan, 2007/08–2009/10
- Ahsan Khan, 1981/82
- Farhad Khan, 1968/69
- Amir Khan, 1968/69
- Amir Khan, 2004/05–2013/14
- Ilyas Khan, 1989/90–1990/91
- Iqbal Ahmed Khan, 1949/50
- Kamran Khan, 2010/11
- Mehboodullah Khan, 1971/72–1972/73
- Mustafa Khan, 1978/79–1980/81
- Rafiullah Khan, 1968/69–1980/81
- Sarfaraz Khan, 2015/16
- Yusuf Ali Khan, 1982/83–1985/86
- Shashikant Khandkar, 1979/80–1993/94
- Balbir Khanna, 1949/50–1953/54
- Ravi Kichlu, 1954/55–1955/56
- Krirendra Singh, 1951/52
- Yajuvendra Krishanatry, ?/?
- R Krishnamurthy, 1955/56–1957/58
- Kukreja, 1951/52
- OP Kukreja, 1958/59
- Akhil Kumar, 2002/03
- **Bhuvneshwar Kumar**, 2007/08–2015/16
- Manu Kumar, 1996/97
- **Praveen Kumar**, 2004/05–2015/16
- Saurabh Kumar, 2015/16

== L ==
- Riazul Latif, 1956/57

== M ==
- Ghauri Majid, 1969/70–1976/77
- S Malhotra, 2000/01
- Prashant Malviya, 2001/02–2008/09
- Manchandra, 1960/61
- Ashwani Mandhani, 2005/06
- **Vijay Manjrekar**, 1957/58
- Manoj Singh, 1995/96–1999/00
- R Marwha, 1957/58–1958/59
- Anil Mathur, 1976/77–1985/86
- Gopal Mathur, 1952/53–1960/61
- Servosh Mehrotra, 1980/81–1990/91
- V Mehta, 1961/62
- Arun Mishra, 1955/56–1965/66
- Amit Mishra, 2012/13–2015/16
- Rajneesh Mishra, 1999/00–2007/08
- MN Misra, 1953/54
- R Misra, 1954/55
- Virendra Modi, 1957/58
- B Mohammad, 1968/69–1970/71
- Ananda Mohan, 1950/51–1951/52
- Rajesh Mohan, 1976/77
- Ram Mohan, 1956/57
- Vishwa Mohan, 1954/55
- Mohinder Singh, 1955/56
- Ahmed Mohsin, 1965/66–1966/67
- V Moitra, 1954/55
- Moolchand, 1969/70
- Manoj Mudgal, 1992/93–2001/02
- Ali Murtaza, 2005/06–2015/16
- Ghulam Murtaza, 1962/63–1972/73
- KVR Murthy, 1961/62–1966/67

== N ==
- S Nagaswamy, 1963/64
- Najamuddin, 1952/53
- Mohammad Nasim, 1963/64
- Akshdeep Nath, 2010/11–2015/16
- Dinesh Nautiyal, 1960/61–1973/74
- **C. K. Nayudu**, 1956/57
- C. N. Nayudu, 1956/57
- **C. S. Nayudu**, 1956/57–1958/59
- S. S. Nayudu, 1956/57–1958/59

== O ==
- Obaidullah, 1952/53
- Sandir Om Prakash, 1949/50–1950/51

== P ==
- R Pal, 1968/69
- Rajabahadur Pal, 2012/13
- Rambabu Pal, 1990/91–1996/97
- Vinod Pande, 1991/92
- Arun Pandey, 2000/01
- Prashant Mishra, 2000/06
- **Gyanendra Pandey**, 1988/89–2006/07
- Mukesh Pandey, 1986/87
- Parvinder Singh, 1999/00–2014/15
- Peter Paul, 1969/70
- Dhiraj Pradhan, 1996/97
- K Prakash, 1965/66
- Amba Prasad, 1999/00
- Premsagar, 1962/63–1964/65
- A Puri, 1986/87
- Dev Puri, 1952/53
- SN Puri, 1965/66

== Q ==
- Asad Qasim, 1964/65–1975/76

== R ==
- Arif Rabbani, 1954/55
- **Suresh Raina**, 2002/03–2015/16
- Ankit Rajpoot, 2012/13–2015/16
- Bhurke Ramchandra, 1950/51
- Pratap Rana, 1987/88–1988/89
- Rahul Rawat, 2013/14
- Abbas Raza, 2006/07
- Musi Raza, 1997/98–2000/01
- Mohsin Raza, 1987/88–1988/89
- Agha Razvi, 1955/56–1959/60
- Rinku Singh, 2013/14–2015/16
- Nitesh Yadav , 2020/98–2024/01

== S ==
- M Sadiq, 1960/61
- Mohammad Saif, 1997/98–2005/06
- Mohammad Saif, 2014/15–2015/16
- Samarth Singh, 2015/16
- Sanjay Singh, 1986/87–1987/88
- N Sanyal, 1954/55–1955/56
- Rahul Sapru, 1982/83–1998/99
- SK Satpathy, 1962/63–1964/65
- Subodh Saxena, 1976/77
- P Sen, 1953/54–1957/58
- Shailendra Sengar, 2007/08–2008/09
- Balendu Shah, 1953/54–1954/55
- Mohammad Shahid, 1966/67–1980/81
- Rizwan Shamshad, 1990/91–2006/07
- S Shanmugam, 1964/65
- Sharfuddin, 1969/70–1975/76
- Ashu Sharma, 2000/01–2001/02
- **Gopal Sharma**, 1978/79–1993/94
- Kishore Sharma, 1984/85–1987/88
- Naman Sharma, 2009/10
- Rakesh Sharma, 1996/97–1998/99
- Rakesh Sharma, 1983/84
- Ramesh Sharma, 1977/78
- Ramgopal Sharma, 1973/74
- Rohit Sharma, 1989/90
- Subash Sharma, 1981/82–1982/83
- Umang Sharma, 2012/13–2015/16
- Almas Shaukat, 2015/16
- Shivasankar, 1952/53–1953/54
- Anand Shukla, 1959/60–1977/78
- Mahendra Shukla, 1948/49–1950/51
- Ravikant Shukla, 2004/05–2011/12
- Saurabh Shukla, 1992/93–2002/03
- Shivakant Shukla, 2003/04–2010/11
- Simant Singh, 1998/99
- Simran Singh, 1952/53–1955/56
- **R. P. Singh**, 1982/83–1995/96
- **R. P. Singh**, 2003/04–2014/15
- Ranji Sinha, 1949/50–1952/53
- Vishwajit Sinha, 1981/82
- Arvind Solanki, 1999/00–2001/02
- Somanan Singh, 1951/52
- Rohit Prakash Srivastava, 2000/01–2011/12
- Shashikant Srivastava, 1970/71–1980/81
- Shalabh Srivastava, 1999/00–2010/11
- Tanmay Srivastava, 2006/07–2015/16
- Sureshnagar, 1966/67

== T ==
- MC Taluqdar, 1950/51
- Mohammad Tarif, 1964/65–1966/67
- Kannhiya Tejwani, 1986/87–1988/89
- Bhalchandra Telang, 1949/50–1951/52
- Ankit Tiwari, 2012/13
- Krishna Tiwari, 1955/56–1966/67
- Pankaj Tiwari, 1997/98–2000/01
- RK Tiwari, 1949/50–1953/54
- Vijay Tiwari, 1960/61–1962/63
- Mritunjay Tripathi, 1999/00–2003/04
- Tulshidhar, 1957/58
- Akhil Tyagi, 1998/99–1999/00
- **Sudeep Tyagi**, 2007/08–2012/13

== V ==
- Vaidyanathan, 1974/75
- Vipin Vats, 1985/86–1992/93
- Venkatesh Singh, 1960/61
- Aman Verma, 2003/04
- Akash Verma, 2014/15
- Lalit Verma, 2003/04
- Naresh Vig, 1968/69
- Vishwajit Singh, 1996/97–1997/98
- Sheel Vohra, 1965/66

== W ==
- Mohammad Wahidullah, 1949/50–1951/52
- Arshad Waliullah, 1958/59–1973/74

== Y ==
- Avinash Yadav, 2005/06–2006/07
- Ashish Yadav, 2007/08–2010/11
- Jyoti Yadav, 1994/95–2006/07
- Kuldeep Yadav, 2013/14–2015/16
- Pradeep Yadav, 1997/98–1999/00
- Ranjit Yadav, 1994/95–1996/97
- Satyendra Yadav, 1994/95–1995/96
- Upendra Yadav, 2013/14
- Vishal Yadav, 1986/87–1991/92
- Khalid Yusuf, 1964/65

== Z ==
- Ali Zaidi, 2002/03–2006/07
- Ashish Zaidi, 1988/89–2006/07
- Devindra Zinda, 1986/87
