= List of Madhya Pradesh cricketers =

This is a partial list of cricketers who have played first-class, List A or Twenty20 cricket for the Madhya Pradesh cricket team (formerly called Holkar cricket team).

== A ==
- Avesh Khan,
- Abbas Ali,
- Anil Acharya,
- Vipin Acharya,
- S Aditya,
- Rish Ahir,
- Kadir Ahmed,
- Abhijeet Singh,
- Aman Solanki,
- Anand Singh,
- Javed Ansari,
- Suhail Ansari,
- Anurag Singh,
- Ashutosh Singh,
- Asif Ali,
- Vijay Awasthy,
- Ayaan Khan,

== B ==
- Narendra Bagatheria, 1969/70–1983/84
- Salman Baig, 2009/10–2014/15
- Anand Bais, 2012/13–2015/16
- Rahul Bakshi, 2003/04–2012/13
- Pradeep Banerjee, 1977/78–1980/81
- Shute Banerjee, 1959/60
- Padmakar Barlingay, 1955/56–1956/57
- Jagdeep Baveja, 2015/16
- Suthar Bhagwandas, 1958/59–1978/79
- Abhishek Bhandari, 2018–19
- Harpreet Singh Bhatia, 2007/08-present
- Ramesh Bhatia, 1959/60–1973/74
- K. Bhatnagar, 1948/49, 1949/50
- Sarvesh Bhatnagar, 1988/89
- Abhinav Bhatt, 2001/02
- P Bhave, 1965/66–1968/69
- RK Bhave, 1954/55
- Madhav Bhide, 1954/55
- Bhupinder Singh, 1985/86
- Aryaman Birla, 2017/18–2018/19
- Udit Birla, 2009/10-present
- MV Bobjee, 1957/58
- Devendra Bundela, 1995/96-present

== C ==
- Govind Chauhan, 1970/71
- PM Chauhan, 1954/55
- Rajesh Chauhan, 1988/89–2000/01
- Avinash Chitale, 1961/62
- Dinesh Chopra, 1994/95–1996/97
- Satyam Choudhary, 2012/13–2014/15

== D ==
- Hemu Dalvi, 1958/59–1959/60
- SP Dalvi, 1970/71
- Ankit Dane, 2015/16
- Ashwin Das, 2015/16
- Tapan Das, 1973/74
- Puneet Datey, 2013/14-present
- Rajesh Dave, 1980/81–1982/83
- TN Deo, 1953/54
- Kiran Deodhar, 1982/83
- Shashank Deshmukh, 1982/83–1983/84
- Dinkar Deshpande, 1955/56–1956/57
- Sohrab Dhaliwal, 2013/14-present
- Sushil Dhama, 1976/77
- Sunil Dholpure, 2001/02–2008/09
- Ramesh Divecha, 1954/55
- Vishnu Dixit, 1957/58–1958/59
- Narendra Dua, 1963/64–1974/75
- Rajeev Dua, 1986/87–1987/88
- Durga Das, 1960/61
- Prashant Dwevedi, 1987/88–1998/99

== G ==
- Hiralal Gaekwad, 1957/58–1963/64
- VR Ghetge, 1942/43
- DS Godbole, 1952/53–1953/54
- KG Gokhale, 1957/58
- PM Gokhale, 1954/55–1955/56
- Yogesh Golwalkar, 2000/01–2008/09
- Gopal Singh, 1957/58
- Gulrez Ali, 1965/66–1984/85
- Avadesh Gupta, 1976/77–1982/83
- Gurudyal Singh, 1951/52
- Gurusharan Singh, 2000/01

== H ==
- Mehmood Hassan, 1966/67–1974/75
- Manzur Hasan, 1976/77–1986/87
- Mihir Hirwani 2014/15-present
- Narendra Hirwani 1984/85–2005/06

== I ==
- Shridhar Iyer, 2009/10
- Venkatesh Iyer, 2014/15-present

== J ==
- Ashutosh Jadhav, 2006/07–2009/10
- Udai Jadhav, 1959/60–1965/66
- Ashok Jagdale, 1961/62–1979/80
- Sanjay Jagdale, 1968/69–1982/83
- DR Jagtap, 1958/59
- Sobodh Jain, 1985/86–1987/88
- Saransh Jain, 2013/14-present
- Jamnadas Daga, 1951/52–1955/56
- Bhagtheria Jayantilal, 1961/62–1967/68
- SS Jog, 1950/51–1952/53
- A Joshi, 1970/71–1971/72
- Sashi Joshi, 1982/83

== K ==
- SR Kale, 1943/44
- Hrishikesh Kanitkar, 2008/09–2009/10
- Rajesh Kannojiya, 2006/07–2008/09
- Devang Kapadia, 1989/90–1991/92
- MG Karu, 1950/51
- RK Kaul, 1954/55
- AD Kelkar, 1953/54
- AK Kelkar, 1952/53–1954/55
- Kamraj Kesari, 1950/51–1956/57
- Akhil Khan, 1964/65
- Ahsan H Khan, 1958/59–1960/61
- Asadullah Khan, 1984/85
- Mehmood Khan, 1981/82–1982/83
- Jogesh Khattar, 1962/63–1964/65
- Balkrishna Kher, 1962/63–1965/66
- HM Kher, 1958/59–1961/62
- Amay Khurasiya, 1989/90–2006/07
- Ravi Kohli, 1990/91
- Amal Kokje, 2003/04
- Sulkashan Kulkarni, 2001/02
- UM Kumre, 1956/57
- SN Kunzru, 1943/44 (Kunzru made a single first-class appearance for the team, then called Gwalior, against Delhi)
- Ankit Kushwah, 2014/15-present

== L ==
- Abhay Laghate, 1984/85–1988/89
- Sunil Lahore, 1985/86–2000/01
- Jitender Likhar, 2001/02–2004/05
- Cyril Lobo, 1955/56

== M ==
- Manoj Kumar Bais, 2014 to present
- Jiva Malak, 1954/55–1956/57
- Surendra Malviya, 2013/14–2014/15
- MV Mandpe, 1952/53–1953/54
- Maninder Singh, 2000/01
- SM Manohar, 1953/54
- B Marfatia jr, 1957/58
- B Marfatia sr, 1957/58–1958/59
- Sohail Masood, 2005/06
- RD Mathur, 1943/44
- R Matkar, 1957/58–1962/63
- Mehmood Khan, 1972/73
- Narendra Menon, 2003/04
- Nitin Menon, 1967/68–1981/82
- VV Mirashi, 1959/60
- GD Mishra, 1951/52
- Mohnish Mishra, 2000/01–2015/16
- Sanjay Mishra, 2014/15
- V Mohandas, 1993/94
- UH Munshi, 1956/57
- Murtuza Ali, 2006/07–2013/14
- Mushtaq Ali, 1957/58

== N ==
- Arjun Naidu, 1955/56
- G Naidu, 1960/61
- Gopi Naidu, 1950/51–1951/52
- Kappu Naidu, 1958/59
- Suraya Naidu, 1954/55
- Sheshrao Naidu, 1951/52
- Ashotosh Naik, 1976/77–1980/81
- S Naqvi, 1981/82
- V Narang, 1967/68–1974/75
- R Narasimhan, 1950/51–1955/56
- CN Nayudu, 1959/60
- CS Nayudu, 1960/61
- Prakash Nayudu, 1957/58–1961/62
- Vijay Nayudu, 1960/61–1977/78
- Rajendra Nigam, 1974/75–1976/77
- Devashish Nilosey, 1984/85–1995/96
- Narayan Nivsarkar, 1957/58–1960/61
- S Nivsarkar, 1966/67

== O ==
- Naman Ojha, 2000/01–2015/16

== P ==
- Manish Panchasara, 1997/98
- Pankan Pande, 1975/76
- Anshuman Pandey, 1995/96–1996/97
- Ishwer Pandey, 2009/10–2015/16
- Sanjay Pandey, 1996/97–2009/10
- Chandrakant Pandit, 1994/95–2000/01
- R Pandit, 1962/63
- KD Paranjpe, 1954/55
- Dhiraj Parekh, 1960/61
- RS Parihar, 1983/84
- Devendra Parmar, 1993/94–2001/02
- Mudassar Pasha, 2001/02–2007/08
- SG Patankar, 1958/59
- Anand Patel, 1976/77–1982/83
- GL Patel, 1952/53
- Kirti Patel, 1987/88–1997/98
- Mukesh Patel, 1975/76
- Paramanandbhai Patel, 1953/54
- Ramnik Patel, 1982/83–1988/89
- Sharavan Patel, 1964/65–1976/77
- Ambalal Patidar, 2001/02
- Rajat Patidar, 2015/16
- Sandeep Patil, 1988/89–1992/93
- Nikhil Patwardhan, 1997/98–2005/06
- Amit Paul, 2004/05–2008/09
- Vinod Pendarkar, 1962/63–1969/70
- Shantanu Pitre, 2003/04–2008/09
- Kannu Powar, 1957/58–1965/66
- Atul Prabhakar, 1991/92–1993/94
- Prable Pratap Singh, 2009/10
- A Puranik, 1983/84

== R ==
- Rafiq Khan, 1970/71–1974/75
- Syedm Rahim, 1950/51–1956/57
- PK Rai, 1960/61–1961/62
- Raja Ali, 1996/97–1999/00
- Krishnamurthy Rajagopalan, 1991/92–1999/00
- Anand Rajan, 2005/06–2013/14
- Ajay Rajput, 2012/13
- Rama Rao, 1959/60–1960/61
- Rameez Khan, 2007/08–2015/16
- Ranawat, 1960/61
- Khandu Rangnekar, 1958/59
- Gopal Rao, 1975/76–1984/85
- Pankaj Rao, 2008/09
- Vineet Rao, 1974/75–1980/81
- MV Ravindra, 1959/60
- Yogesh Rawat, 2013/14–2015/16
- ZE Reshamwalla, 1955/56
- Riaz Khan, 1952/53–1955/56

== S ==
- Srajan Bhasin, 2005/06-
- Surendra Malviya, 2020–21
- Sabarwal, 1965/66–1966/67
- Anup Sabnis, 1983/84–1984/85
- Himalaya Sagar, 2007/08–2008/09
- Mukesh Sahni, 1984/85–1995/96 (Note: Later became a coach for the team. He is the father of Parth Sahani.)
- Sumit Sharma, 2018/19–2020/21
- Mukesh Sahni, 1984/85–1995/96
- Chandraprakash Sahu, 1996/97–2002/03
- Santosh Sahu, 1998/99–1999/00
- Sudhir Sahu, 1956/57
- Mohammad Saif, 1994/95–1996/97
- Chandrakant Sakure, 2015/16
- Salim Ali Khan, 1961/62–1964/65
- Wasuderao Sane, 1950/51–1954/55
- Chandu Sarwate, 1958/59–1967/68
- MK Sarwate, 1950/51–1956/57
- T. Seshachalam, 2010/11–2015/16
- Mahendra Satokar, 1984/85–1991/92
- Ramesh Satokar, 1983/84
- Nikhil Sawke, 2013/14
- Jalaj Saxena, 2005/06–2015/16
- Jatin Saxena, 2001/02–2014/15
- Subodh Saxena, 1962/63–1981/82
- TA Sekhar, 1988/89–1989/90
- Kapil Seth, 2000/01
- Shadab Khan, 2006/07–2009/10
- J Shah, 1964/65
- Shan-E-Alam, 2006/07
- Daya Shankar, 1943/44
- Amit Sharma, 2010/11–2012/13
- Ankit Sharma, 2009/10–2015/16
- Manohar Sharma, 1959/60–1975/76
- Shubham S Sharma, 2013/14–2014/15
- Varunesh Sharma, 2012/13
- Karun Shekawat, 1975/76–1983/84
- Shinde, 1970/71–1971/72
- Niranjan Shirke, 1981/82
- Aditya Shrivastava, 2014/15–2015/16
- Rohan Shrivastava, 2009/10
- Mahendra Shukla, 1947/48
- Shyam Lal, 1957/58–1959/60
- Ankush Singh, 2018/19 (Note: Made one List A appearance for the team.)
- Balbhadra Singh, 1941/42
- Chandra Singh, 1985/86–1991/92
- PP Singh, 1970/71
- Sachin Deshmukh, 1996-97-98-99–2000
- Ram Singh, 1943/44
- Roop Singh, 1943/44
- Surinder Singh, 1964/65
- Harvinder Singh Sodhi 1990/91–2003/04
- Ankit Srivastava 1999/00–2000/01
- Linganath Subbu 1959/60
- TP Sudhindra, 2005/06–2011/12
- Suryaveer Singh, 1958/59
- Shubham Verma, 2007/2009
- Shachindra bhatt,1995/2000
- Shubham Puranik - 1998–2002

== T ==
- Rohit Talwar, 1982/83–1989/90
- KS Thakur, 1950/51
- Sridhar Thakur, 1950/51
- Tiwari, 1965/66
- Mahendra Tiwari, 1983/84–1987/88
- Brijesh Tomar, 2002/03–2008/09

== V ==
- MV Vaidya, 1952/53
- Jitendra Vegad, 1985/86–1987/88
- R Venkataraman, 1954/55–1955/56
- Avijit Verma, 2005/06
- Bharat Verma, 1995/96
- Ravi Verma, 1984/85–1986/87
- Amitabh Vijayvargiya, 1986/87–1993/94
- Sunil Vyas, 1977/78

== W ==
- A Wagh, 1983/84
- Abdul Wahid, 1974/75–1975/76

== Y ==
- Gaurav Yadav, 2012/13–2014/15
- JP Yadav, 1994/95–2012/13
- Omprakash Yadav, 2001/02
- Rishi Yengde, 2003/04–2004/05

== Z ==
- Zafar Ali, 2006/07–2015/16
- Zuber Khan, 1992/93–1994/95
