= Lists of Indian cricketers =

Below is a list of lists of Indian cricketers.

== By format ==
=== Men's team ===
- List of India Test cricketers
  - List of India Test wicket-keepers
- List of India ODI cricketers
- List of India Twenty20 International cricketers
  - List of India Twenty-20 wicket-keepers

=== Women's team ===
- List of India women Test cricketers
- List of India women ODI cricketers
- List of India women Twenty20 International cricketers

== By zone ==
- List of Central Zone cricketers
- List of East Zone cricketers
- List of North Zone cricketers
- List of South Zone cricketers
- List of West Zone cricketers

== By state ==
=== Current domestic teams ===
- List of Andhra cricketers
- List of Assam cricketers
- List of Baroda cricketers
- List of Bengal cricketers
- List of Bihar cricketers
- List of Chhattisgarh cricketers
- List of Delhi cricketers
- List of Goa cricketers
- List of Gujarat cricketers
- List of Haryana cricketers
- List of Himachal Pradesh cricketers
- List of Hyderabad cricketers
- List of Jammu and Kashmir cricketers
- List of Jharkhand cricketers
- List of Karnataka cricketers
- List of Kerala cricketers
- List of Madhya Pradesh cricketers
- List of Maharashtra cricketers
- List of Mizoram cricketers
- List of Mumbai cricketers
- List of Nagaland cricketers
- List of Odisha cricketers
- List of Puducherry cricketers
- List of Punjab cricketers (India)
- List of Railways cricketers
- List of Rajasthan cricketers
- List of Saurashtra cricketers
- List of Services cricketers
- List of Sikkim cricketers
- List of Tamil Nadu cricketers
- List of Tripura cricketers
- List of Uttar Pradesh cricketers
- List of Vidarbha cricketers
- List of Uttarakhand cricketers

=== Defunct domestic teams ===
- List of Europeans first-class cricketers
- List of Northern Punjab cricketers
- List of Southern Punjab cricketers
- List of Travancore-Cochin cricketers
