= 1997–98 Ranji Trophy =

- The Ranji Trophy, which the winners get.
- Administrator: BCCI
- Cricket format: First-class cricket
- Tournament format(s): League and knockout
- Champions: Karnataka (5th title)
- Participants: 27
- Most runs: Vinod Kambli (Bombay) (880)
- Most wickets: Paras Mhambrey (Bombay) (48)

The 1997–98 Ranji Trophy was the 64th season of the Ranji Trophy cricket championship. Karnataka won the final match against Uttar Pradesh on first innings lead.

== Super League ==
Group A

Team	Played	W	D	L	NR	Points
Karnataka	4	3	1	0	0	27
Mumbai	4	3	1	0	0	26
Orissa	4	3	1	0	0	13
Punjab	4	3	1	0	0	9
Railways	4	3	1	0	0	5

- Karnataka and Mumbai qualified for the Knockout Stage.
- Karnataka received a bye to the semifinals as the group winner.
- Mumbai received a bye to the semifinals as the defending champions.

Group B

Team	Played	W	D	L	NR	Points
Uttar Pradesh	2	0	1	0	1	7
Bengal	2	0	1	0	1	7
Maharashtra	2	0	2	0	0	6
Delhi	2	0	1	0	0	3
Tamil Nadu	2	0	1	0	0	3

- Uttar Pradesh and Bengal qualified for the Knockout Stage.
- Delhi and Tamil Nadu were suspended from the tournament on February 21, 1998. Points against them were not considered for the remaining teams.

Group C

Team	Played	W	D	L	NR	Points
Uttar Pradesh	4	1	3	0	0	19
Haryana	4	1	3	0	0	19
Madhya Pradesh	4	0	4	0	0	18
Baroda	4	0	3	1	0	13
Bihar	4	0	3	1	0	11

- Hyderabad and Haryana qualified for the Knockout Stage.

== Knockout stage ==
Quarterfinals
Hyderabad	209 & 244
Bengal	244 & 166
Karnataka
bye
Mumbai
bye
Haryana	156 & 423
Uttar Pradesh	613

Semifinals
Karnataka	309 & 157/9
Hyderabad	283 & 179
Mumbai	94 & 328
Uttar Pradesh	293 & 135/7

Final
Karnataka	617/9d
Uttar Pradesh	134 & 416/7

=== Quarterfinal 1 ===
30 March - 3 April 1998
Scorecard

Hyderabad	v	Bengal
209 (110.5 overs); Daniel Manohar 44; Ajay Varma 4/31 (15.5 overs)		243 (115.3 overs); Saba Karim 69; Narender Singh 7/103 (36 overs)
244 (92.4 overs); Daniel Manohar 66; Subroto Banerjee 5/58 (22.4 overs)		166 (67.4 overs); Saba Karim 59*; Daniel Manohar 4/48 (14)

Hyderabad won by 44 runs
Gymkhana Ground, Secunderabad, Secunderabad
Umpires: KS Giridharan and N Menon

- Hyderabad won the toss and elected to bat.

=== Quarterfinal 2 ===
30 March - 3 April 1998
Scorecard

Haryana	v	Uttar Pradesh
156 (63.3 overs); Vijay Yadav 23; Obaid Kamal 3/37 (17 overs)		613 (224.5 overs); Saurabh Shukla 189; Dhanraj Singh 3/77 (30.5 overs)
423 (115.3 overs); Jitender Sharma 149; Ashish Zaidi 4/111 (25.3 overs)

Uttar Pradesh won by an innings and 34 runs
Ordnance Equipment Factory Ground, Kanpur
Umpires: CR Vijayaraghavan and S Dandapani

- Uttar Pradesh won the toss and elected to field.

=== Semifinal 1 ===
9–12 April 1998
Scorecard

Mumbai (H)	v	Uttar Pradesh
94 (34.3 overs); Jatin Paranjpe 42; Ashish Zaidi 6/29 (11.3 overs)		293 (99.4 overs); Gyanendra Pandey 109; Paras Mhambrey 3/48 (21 overs)
328 (112 overs); Amol Muzumdar 87; Obaid Kamal 5/58 (31 overs)		135/7 (60.2 overs); Gyanendra Pandey 45*; Nilesh Kulkarni 4/46 (23.2 overs)

Uttar Pradesh won by 3 wickets
Wankhede Stadium, Mumbai
Umpires: Francis Gomes and Arani Jayaprakash

- Mumbai won the toss and elected to bat.
- Amol Muzumdar (Mumbai) passed 4,000 runs in first-class cricket.

=== Semifinal 2 ===
9–12 April 1998
Scorecard

Hyderabad (H)	v	Karnataka
283 (126.1 overs); G Arvind Kumar; Dodda Ganesh 5/74 (28.1 overs)		309 (135.3 overs); J. Arunkumar 85; Kanwaljit Singh 7/62 (39.3 overs)
179 (62.2 overs); A Nand Kishore 39; Dodda Ganesh 4/74 (21 overs)		157/9 (75 overs); Fazal Khaleel 51; Kanwaljit Singh 7/38 (32 overs)

Karnataka won by 1 wicket
Gymkhana Ground, Secunderabad
Umpires: M. R. Singh and Chandra Sathe

- Hyderabad won the toss and elected to bat.
- Prahladrao Srinivasa Murthy (Karnataka) made his first-class debut.
- Both J. Arunkumar and Sunil Joshi (Karnataka) passed 2,000 runs in first-class cricket.
- Rahul Dravid (Karnataka) passed 7,000 runs in first-class cricket and 1,000 runs for the season.

=== Final ===
19–23 April 1998
Scorecard

Uttar Pradesh	v	Karnataka (H)
134 (67.1 overs); Jyoti Yadav 36; Sunil Joshi 4/37 (23.1 overs)		617/9d (211.3 overs); Rahul Dravid 215; Obaid Kamal 4/99 (45.3 overs)
416/7 (171 overs); Saurabh Shukla 91; Sunil Joshi 3/112 (61 overs)

Match drawn (Karnataka won on first innings lead)
M. Chinnaswamy Stadium, Bangalore
Umpires: Aloke Bhattacharjee and Suresh Deo
Player of the match: Rahul Dravid (Karnataka)

- Uttar Pradesh won the toss and elected to bat.
- Gyanendra Pandey (Uttar Pradesh) and Sujith Somasunder (Karnataka) passed and 3,000 and 2,000 runs respectively in first-class cricket.

== Scorecards and averages ==
- CricketArchive
