= 1986–87 Ranji Trophy =

1986-87 Ranji Trophy
- The Ranji Trophy, which the winners get.
- Administrator: BCCI
- Cricket format: First-class cricket
- Tournament format(s): League and knockout
- Champions: Hyderabad (2nd title)
- Participants: 27
- Most runs: Carlton Saldanha (Karnataka) (782)
- Most wickets: Sunil Lahore (Madhya Pradesh) (32)

The 1986–87 Ranji Trophy was the 53rd season of the Ranji Trophy. Hyderabad won their second title defeating Delhi on first innings lead.

== Highlights ==
- Carlton Saldanha, who was the top scorer of the season, scored 89, 77, 70, 74, 84, 70 and 142 in his first seven innings.

== Group stage ==
=== North Zone ===
Team	Pld	W	L	D	T	NR	Pts	Q
Haryana	5	2	0	3	0	0	75	2.491
Delhi	5	1	0	4	0	0	73	2.016
Punjab	5	2	0	3	0	0	65	1.619
Jammu and Kashmir	5	1	2	2	0	0	42	0.601
Services	5	1	3	1	0	0	39	0.648
Himachal Pradesh	5	0	2	3	0	0	33	0.379

=== Central Zone ===
Team	Pld	W	L	D	T	NR	Pts	Q
Rajasthan	4	2	0	2	0	0	54	1.239
Railways	4	1	1	2	0	0	44	1.359
Vidarbha	4	0	0	4	0	0	43	0.859
Uttar Pradesh	4	1	0	3	0	0	35	0.923
Madhya Pradesh	4	0	3	1	0	0	31	0.775

=== West Zone ===
Team	Pld	W	L	D	T	NR	Pts	Q
Bombay	4	2	0	2	0	0	62	1.669
Gujarat	4	0	1	3	0	0	44	0.903
Baroda	4	1	2	1	0	0	41	1.002
Maharashtra	4	1	0	3	0	0	40	0.881
Saurashtra	4	0	1	3	0	0	36	0.789

=== South Zone ===
Team	Pld	W	L	D	T	NR	Pts	Q
Karnataka	5	0	0	5	0	0	75	1.458
Hyderabad	5	1	0	4	0	0	61	1.229
Tamil Nadu	5	1	0	4	0	0	59	0.948
Kerala	5	0	0	5	0	0	56	1.012
Andhra	5	0	1	4	0	0	48	0.966
Goa	5	0	1	4	0	0	37	0.552

=== East Zone ===
Team	Pld	W	L	D	T	NR	Pts	Q
Bengal	4	1	0	3	0	0	69	1.729
Bihar	4	1	0	3	0	0	50	1.939
Assam	4	1	0	3	0	0	45	1.039
Orissa	4	0	0	4	0	0	41	1.298
Tripura	4	0	3	1	0	0	17	0.258

== Knockout stage ==
Pre-Quarter-finals
31 Jan 1987 — Calcutta
Bengal	614/7d & 17/2
Rajasthan	465
1 Feb 1987 — Patna
Bihar	422 & 90/1
Railways	210 & 394/7d

Quarter-finals
22 Feb 1987 — Calcutta
Bengal	464/9
Delhi (Q)	545/7d
14 Feb 1987 — Bangalore
Karnataka	465 & 166/6
Bombay	404
14 Feb 1987 — Hyderabad
Hyderabad	605/7d & 224/6d
Gujarat	314 & 129/2
14 Feb 1987 — Faridabad
Haryana	234
Bihar	360 & 283/4

Semi-finals
07 Mar 1987 — Delhi
Delhi	711/3d & 247/1
Karnataka	440
07 Mar 1987 — Secunderabad
Hyderabad	783/8d
Bihar	468 & 87/0

Finals
21 Mar 1987 — Delhi
Delhi	433
Hyderabad	457 & 480/7

(Q) - Advanced to next round on better Quotient.

=== Final ===
21–26 March 1987
Scorecard

Hyderabad	v	Delhi (H)
457 (138 overs); Abdul Azeem 114, Arshad Ayub 174; Mohinder Amarnath 3/48		433 (128 overs); Bhaskar Pillai 160*; Rajesh Yadav 5/114
480/7 (138.5 overs); Vijay Mohanraj 211*; Jaspal Singh 4/132

Hyderabad won on first innings lead
Feroz Shah Kotla, Delhi
Umpires: N. N. Patwardhan, Joydeb Roy

- Hyderabad won the toss and decided to bat

== Scorecards and averages ==
- Espncricinfo
