= Rambabu Pal =

Indian cricketer (1973–2007)

Personal information
- Full name: Rambabu Nankhu Pal
- Born: 1 January 1973; Allahabad, India
- Died: 13 October 2007 (aged 34); Allahabad, India
- Source: Cricinfo, 7 April 2021

Rambabu Nankhu Pal (1 January 1973 – 13 October 2007) was an Indian cricketer. He played in six first-class and eight List A matches for Uttar Pradesh from 1990/91 to 1996/97. He also played for the Indian under-19 team. Pal later worked in a bank in Kanpur. He committed suicide aged 34, reportedly as a result of "poor mental condition" and teasing suffered at work.

== See also ==
- List of Uttar Pradesh cricketers
