= Mazhar Ansari =

Indian cricketer (born 1961)

Personal information
- Born: 17 July 1961 (age 65); Lucknow, India
- Source: ESPNcricinfo, 7 April 2021

Mazhar Ansari (born 17 July 1961) is an Indian cricketer. He played in 35 first-class matches for Uttar Pradesh from 1984/85 to 1991/92.

== See also ==
- List of Uttar Pradesh cricketers
