= Nissar Trophy =

First class cricket tournament

The Mohammad Nissar Trophy was an annual first class cricket competition which took place in September. It was contested over four days between the most recent winners of the Ranji Trophy (India) and Quaid-i-Azam Trophy (Pakistan). The trophy was named after former pre-partition Indian Test cricketer Mohammad Nissar.

The annual contest, which commenced in 2006, was held on a home and away basis. Uttar Pradesh defeated Sialkot in Dharamsala to claim the inaugural title, while Mumbai took on Karachi Urban in Karachi the following season and regained the trophy based on a first-innings lead. In 2008, Sui Northern Gas Pipelines Limited beat Delhi on a first-innings lead after the match was drawn to become the first Pakistan side to win the trophy.

== Winners ==
Season	Winner	Opponent	Margin	Man of the Match	Stadium
2006	(India) Uttar Pradesh	(Pakistan) Sialkot	by 316 runs	(India) Rizwan Shamshad	HPCA Stadium, Dharamsala, India
2007	(India) Mumbai	(Pakistan) Karachi Urban	on their first innings lead (Match drawn)	(Pakistan) Khurram Manzoor	National Stadium, Karachi, Pakistan
2008	(Pakistan) Sui Northern Gas Pipelines	(India) Delhi	on their first innings lead (Match drawn)	(India) Virat Kohli	Feroz Shah Kotla, New Delhi, India

== Records and statistics ==
- Ravikant Shukla from India was the first player to make a half century.
- Imran Nazir from Pakistan was the first player to make a century.
- Sahil Kukreja was the first Indian to make a century.
- Khurram Manzoor from Pakistan was the only player to make a double century.
- Imran Ali from Pakistan was the only player to take a hat trick, and the only player to take five wickets in an innings.
