= Vijay Dandekar =

Indian cricketer (born 1933)

Personal information
- Born: 28 September 1933 (age 93); Indore, India
- Source: Cricinfo, 7 April 2021

Vijay Dandekar (born 28 September 1933) is an Indian cricketer. He played in twenty-four first-class matches for Uttar Pradesh from 1955/56 to 1967/68.

== See also ==
- List of Uttar Pradesh cricketers
