= Gyanendra Pandey =

Gyanendra Pandey may refer to:

- Gyanendra Pandey (cricketer)
- Gyanendra Pandey (historian)
