= Santosh Sahu =

Indian cricketer (born 1974)

Personal information
- Full name: Santosh Kumar Sahu
- Born: 15 March 1974 (age 52); Bilaspur, India
- Source: Cricinfo, 5 April 2021

Santosh Sahu (born 15 March 1974) is an Indian cricketer. He played in 22 first-class and 31 List A matches for Madhya Pradesh and Railways from 1998 to 2006.

== See also ==
- List of Madhya Pradesh cricketers
