= Joydeb Roy =

Indian cricket umpire

Personal information
- Full name: Joydeb Roy

Umpiring information
- ODIs umpired: 1 (1986)
- Source: ESPNcricinfo, 28 May 2014

Joydeb Roy is a former Indian cricket umpire. The only occasion of Roy umpiring in an international match was the one ODI game he stood in in 1986. He also stood in the 1986-87 Ranji Trophy final.

== See also ==
- List of One Day International cricket umpires
