= Rohit Sharma (Uttar Pradesh cricketer) =

Indian cricketer (born 1968)

Personal information
- Born: 2 November 1968 (age 58)
- Batting: Right-handed

Domestic team information
- Years: Team
- Uttar Pradesh
- Source: Cricinfo, 12 November 2020

Rohit Sharma (born 1968) is an Indian cricketer who played for Uttar Pradesh.
