= Shashikant Khandkar =

Indian cricketer (born 1961)

Personal information
- Born: 10 December 1961 (age 64); Kanpur, India
- Source: Cricinfo, 7 April 2021

Shashikant Khandkar (born 10 December 1961) is an Indian cricketer. He played in 87 first-class and 32 List A matches for Uttar Pradesh from 1979/80 to 1993/94.

== See also ==
- List of Uttar Pradesh cricketers
