= Kapil Seth =

Indian cricketer (1979–2016)

Personal information
- Born: 30 December 1979; Datia, Madhya Pradesh, India
- Died: 2 July 2016 (aged 36)
- Source: ESPNcricinfo, 3 July 2016

Kapil Seth (30 December 1979 – 2 July 2016) was an Indian cricketer. He played first-class cricket for Madhya Pradesh. He died on 2 July 2016 from Hepatitis B.

== See also ==
- List of Madhya Pradesh cricketers
