= Sanjeev Dua =

Cricket umpire

Personal information
- Full name: Sanjeev Dua
- Born: 27 April 1965 (age 61); Indore, Madhya Pradesh, India
- Batting: Right-handed
- Bowling: Right-arm off break
- Role: Umpire
- Relatives: Narendra Dua (father); Rajeev Dua (brother)

Umpiring information
- WODIs umpired: 5 (2006–2014)
- FC umpired: 44 (1999–2016)
- LA umpired: 33 (1999–2014)
- T20 umpired: 20 (2007–2017)
- Source: ESPNcricinfo, 2 April 2017

Sanjeev Dua (born 27 April 1965) is an Indian cricket umpire. Dua has umpired 5 Women's One Day International cricket matches, 44 first-class matches, 33 List A matches and 20 Twenty20 matches as of March 2017.

Dua made his debut as an international umpire during the last round robin match of the 2006 Women's Asia Cup between India and Pakistan at the Sawai Mansingh Stadium in Jaipur. Two days later at the same ground, he stood in the final of the tournament between India and Sri Lanka. Most recently he umpired all three WODI matches between India and Sri Lanka at the Dr. Y.S. Rajasekhara Reddy ACA-VDCA Cricket Stadium in January 2014.
