= Harry Singh =

Welsh cricketer (born 2004)

Personal information
- Full name: Harry Paul Narayan Singh
- Born: 16 June 2004 (age 22); Blackburn, Lancashire, England
- Batting: Right-handed
- Bowling: Right-arm off break
- Relatives: R. P. Singh (father)

Domestic team information
- Years: Team
- 2024–2026: Lancashire (squad no. 16)
- FC debut: 17 September 2024 Lancashire v Somerset
- List A debut: 24 July 2024 Lancashire v Durham

Career statistics
Competition	FC	LA	T20
Matches	10	19	5
Runs scored	175	361	39
Batting average	10.29	19.00	13.00
100s/50s	0/0	0/1	0/0
Top score	36	74	26
Balls bowled	126	396	42
Wickets	0	10	1
Bowling average	–	36.60	73.00
5 wickets in innings	–	0	0
10 wickets in match	–	0	0
Best bowling	–	4/27	1/27
Catches/stumpings	15/–	7/–	7/–
- Source: Cricinfo, 27 September 2026

Harry Paul Narayan Singh (born 16 June 2004) is an English cricketer. A right-handed batsman and right-arm off break bowler, he has played for Lancashire County Cricket Club.

== Personal life ==
Singh is the son of former India international R.P. Singh. He attended Clitheroe Royal Grammar School.

== Career ==
Singh represented England at under-19 level. He signed a rookie contract with Lancashire in March 2023 and made his List A debut for the club in the One-Day Cup, against Durham on 24 July 2024. On 21 August 2024, he fielded in first Test match between England and Sri Lanka as a substitute fielder. Singh made his first-class debut against Somerset in the County Championship on 17 September 2024. On 12 October 2026, Lancashire announced Singh would leave the club when his contract expired at the end of that month.
