= Bhalchandra Telang =

Indian cricketer (1916–1991)

Personal information
- Born: 1916; Varanasi, India
- Died: 22 July 1991 (aged 75)
- Source: ESPNcricinfo, 14 April 2021

Bhalchandra Telang (1916 – 22 July 1991) was an Indian cricketer. He played in twelve first-class matches for Uttar Pradesh from 1934/35 to 1951/52. He played in the first season of the Ranji Trophy, in 1934/35, and captained the team in his final season of his career in 1951/52.

== See also ==
- List of Uttar Pradesh cricketers
