= 1977–78 Ranji Trophy =

Cricket tournament

1977-78 Ranji Trophy
- The Ranji Trophy, which the winners get.
- Administrator: BCCI
- Cricket format: First-class cricket
- Tournament format(s): League and knockout
- Champions: Karnataka (2nd title)
- Participants: 24
- Most runs: Venkat Sunderam (Delhi) (608)
- Most wickets: Rajinder Singh Hans (Uttar Pradesh) (52)

The 1977–78 Ranji Trophy was the 44th season of the Ranji Trophy. Karnataka won their second title defeating Uttar Pradesh.

== Highlights ==
- Bombay finished third in the West Zone and failed to qualify for the knockout stage. Gujarat won all their four matches in the West Zone, a rare feat.
- Bombay were dismissed for 42 by Gujarat. This is their lowest total in Ranji Trophy.
- The loss against Gujarat ended a sequence of 124 matches without defeat for Bombay. Their previous defeat was against Baroda in 1957/58. During these twenty years, Bombay won the Ranji Trophy 18 times.
- Karnataka defeated Kerala without losing a wicket. Kerala scored 141 and 124, and Karnataka 451/0 decl. The partnership between Sanjay Desai and Roger Binny was then an Indian record for the first wicket.
- Rajinder Goel took 7 wickets for 4 runs in the second innings as Haryana bowled out Jammu Kashmir for 23. Goel's match figures were 13 for 29.

== Group stage ==
=== South Zone ===
Team	Pld	W	L	D	T	NR	Pts	Q
Karnataka	4	3	0	1	0	0	27	2.481
Hyderabad	4	2	0	2	0	0	25	2.247
Tamil Nadu	4	1	1	2	0	0	19	1.099
Andhra	4	0	2	2	0	0	8	0.547
Kerala	4	0	3	1	0	0	3	0.232

=== West Zone ===
Team	Pld	W	L	D	T	NR	Pts	Q
Gujarat	4	4	0	0	0	0	32	2.062
Maharashtra	4	1	1	2	0	0	17	0.733
Bombay	4	0	1	3	0	0	13	1.086
Baroda	4	0	1	3	0	0	11	0.818
Saurashtra	4	0	2	2	0	0	8	0.692

=== North Zone ===
Team	Pld	W	L	D	T	NR	Pts	Q
Delhi	4	3	0	1	0	0	30	3.149
Punjab	4	3	1	0	0	0	24	1.306
Haryana	4	2	1	1	0	0	19	1.731
Services	4	1	3	0	0	0	8	0.640
Jammu and Kashmir	4	0	4	0	0	0	0	0.171

=== Central Zone ===
Team	Pld	W	L	D	T	NR	Pts	Q
Uttar Pradesh	4	2	0	2	0	0	26	1.512
Rajasthan	4	2	1	1	0	0	19	1.272
Madhya Pradesh	4	1	1	1	0	1	15	0.903
Vidarbha	4	0	1	3	0	0	9	0.662
Railways	4	0	2	1	0	1	7	0.757

=== East Zone ===
Team	Pld	W	L	D	T	NR	Pts	Q
Bengal	3	2	0	1	0	0	22	3.236
Bihar	3	2	0	1	0	0	19	1.437
Assam	3	0	2	1	0	0	5	0.559
Orissa	3	0	2	0	0	0	3	0.431

== Knockout stage ==
Pre-Quarter-finals
11 Feb 1978 — Ghaziabad
Uttar Pradesh	407 & 41/0
Punjab	287 & 275/9d
21 Feb 1978 — Karad
Maharashtra	237 & 258
Rajasthan	220 & 284/6

Quarter-finals
24 Feb 1978 — Ghaziabad
Uttar Pradesh	186 & 280
Gujarat	154 & 252
17 Feb 1978 — Hyderabad
Hyderabad	317
Bengal	197 & 108/8
26 Feb 1978 — Delhi
Delhi	522/9d
Rajasthan	223 & 196
18 Feb 1978 — Bangalore
Karnataka	486
Bihar	255 & 162

Semi-finals
17 Mar 1978 — Ghaziabad
Uttar Pradesh	267 & 159/3
Hyderabad	247 & 175
17 Mar 1978 — Delhi
Delhi	332 & 195/7d
Karnataka	391 & 94/5

Finals
4 Apr 1978 — Ghaziabad
Uttar Pradesh	129 & 112
Karnataka	434

=== Final ===
4–6 April 1978
Scorecard

Uttar Pradesh (H)	v	Karnataka
129 (50.5 overs); Anand Shukla 32; B. S. Chandrasekhar 6/57 (19.5 overs)		434 (136.4 overs); Gundappa Viswanath 247; Rajinder Hans 9/152 (55.4 overs)
112 (56.2 overs); Shashikant Srivastava 22; B. S. Chandrasekhar 6/24 (17.2 overs)

Karnataka won by an innings and 193 runs
Narendra Mohan Sports Stadium, Mohan Nagar, Uttar Pradesh
Umpires: P. D. Reporter and Har Prasad Sharma

- Uttar Pradesh won the toss and decided to bat.

== Scorecards and averages ==
- CricketArchive
