= Laxmi Hazaria =

Indian cricketer (born 1937)

Personal information
- Full name: Laxminarayan Hazaria
- Born: 10 August 1937 (age 89); Kanpur, India
- Source: ESPNcricinfo, 7 April 2021

Laxmi Hazaria (born 10 August 1937) is an Indian cricketer. He played in twenty-three first-class matches for Uttar Pradesh from 1959/60 to 1972/73. The Laxmi Hazaria XI cricket team competes in domestic tournaments in India.

== See also ==
- List of Uttar Pradesh cricketers
