= Obaid Kamal =

Indian cricketer

Personal information
- Full name: Mohammad Obaid Kamal
- Born: 4 September 1972 (age 54); Allahabad, Uttar Pradesh, India
- Batting: Right-handed
- Bowling: Right-arm medium-fast
- Role: Bowler

Domestic team information
- Years: Team
- 1990/91–1999/00: Uttar Pradesh
- 1993/94–1995/96: Punjab

Career statistics
Competition	FC	List A
Matches	57	33
Runs scored	815	132
Batting average	14.29	8.25
100s/50s	0/2	0/0
Top score	69	20
Balls bowled	11,183	1,469
Wickets	178	37
Bowling average	26.91	26.97
5 wickets in innings	9	1
10 wickets in match	0	n/a
Best bowling	7/74	5/27
Catches/stumpings	22/–	7/–
- Source: ESPNcricinfo, 9 February 2016

Mohammad Obaid Kamal (born 4 September 1972 in Allahabad) is an Indian former first-class cricketer who played for Uttar Pradesh and Punjab. He became a coach and worked as a selector for Uttar Pradesh Cricket Association (UPCA) after his playing career.

== Career ==
A right-arm medium-fast swing bowler, Kamal made his first-class debut for Uttar Pradesh at the age of 18 in the 1990–91 season. He finished as the third-highest wicket-taker of the 1992–93 Ranji Trophy (highest among pace bowlers) with 43 scalps at a sub-20 average. He played for Rest of India in the Irani Cup in 1993–94 at the age of 21 and switched to Punjab later that season. He soon became the first-choice new ball bowler of the zonal team and Rest of India. He returned to Uttar Pradesh after a three-season stint with Punjab, and formed a new ball pair with Ashish Zaidi. He represented India Youth XI and India A, but failed to gain selection for the national team. He played his last first-class match in November 1999 at the age of 27, and was regarded as "one of the best fast bowlers to never play for India".

Kamal became a member of the UPCA senior team selection committee in 2006. He was replaced by Rahul Sapru at the position in 2010. Kamal also worked as a coach who trained cricketers in Lucknow.
