= Rajneesh Mishra =

Indian cricketer (born 1978)

Personal information
- Born: 20 October 1978 (age 48); Lucknow, India
- Source: Cricinfo, 7 April 2021

Rajneesh Mishra (born 20 October 1978) is an Indian cricketer. He played in 16 first-class and 30 List A matches for Uttar Pradesh from 1999 to 2007.

== See also ==
- List of Uttar Pradesh cricketers
