= Rohit Prakash Srivastava =

Indian cricketer (born 1980)

Personal information
- Born: 8 May 1980 (age 46); Allahabad, India
- Source: Cricinfo, 13 April 2021

Rohit Prakash Srivastava (born 8 May 1980) is an Indian cricketer. He played in 35 first-class and 23 List A matches for Uttar Pradesh from 2000 to 2012, including a spell as the team's captain.

== See also ==
- List of Uttar Pradesh cricketers
