= Manoj Mudgal =

Indian cricketer (born 1972)

Personal information
- Born: 18 October 1972 (age 54); Meerut, India
- Source: ESPNcricinfo, 7 April 2021

Manoj Mudgal (born 18 October 1972) is an Indian cricketer. He played in 68 first-class and 57 List A matches for Uttar Pradesh from 1992/93 to 2001/02.

== See also ==
- List of Uttar Pradesh cricketers
