= Mohammad Tarif =

Indian cricketer (born 1946)

Personal information
- Born: 19 October 1946 (age 80); Allahabad, United Provinces, British India
- Relatives: Mohammad Kaif (son); Mohammad Saif (son)
- Source: ESPNcricinfo, 27 August 2021

Mohammad Tarif (born 19 October 1946) is an Indian cricketer. He played in 60 first-class matches from 1964/65 to 1982/83. His sons Mohammad Kaif and Mohammad Saif also played cricket.

== See also ==
- List of Uttar Pradesh cricketers
