= 2008–09 Nissar Trophy =

- Event: 2008–09 Nissar Trophy
| Delhi | SNGPL |
| (India) | (Pakistan) |
| 134 | 266 |
| 36.3 overs | 78.3 overs |
| & |
| 516 |
| 124 |
- Match drawn. SNGPL won on 1st innings.
- Date: 15–18 September 2008
- Venue: Feroz Shah Kotla Stadium, New Delhi, India
- Umpires: Sudhir Asnani (Ind) and Umesh Dubey (Ind)

The Mohammad Nissar Trophy was an annual first class cricket competition which takes place in Feroz Shah Kotla, New Delhi, India from 15 to 18 September 2008. It was contested over four days between Sui Northern Gas Pipelines Limited cricket team the winner of Quaid-i-Azam Trophy from Pakistan and Delhi cricket team the winner of Ranji Trophy from India.

== News ==
- 18 September 2008: SNGPL became the first Pakistan team to win the Mohammad Nissar Trophy as the game ended in a draw after overnight rain ruled out play on the final day.
- 17 September 2008: Delhi, backed by massive scores by the overnight pair of Virat Kohli (197) and Aakash Chopra (182), gained a handsome 384-run lead on the penultimate day.
- 16 September 2008: Delhi wrested the initiative halfway into their Nissar Trophy game against Sui Northern Gas Pipelines Limited.
- 15 September 2008: On a day when 16 wickets tumbled, the honours rested with Imran Ali, Sui Northern Gas Pipeline Limited's (SNGPL) right-arm seamer, who took a hat-trick to sink a star-studded Delhi to 134 under overcast conditions at the Feroz Shah Kotla.
- 14 September 2008: The third Mohammad Nissar Trophy kicks off at the Feroz Shah Kotla in New Delhi on Monday, Delhi taking on Sui Northern Gas Pipeline Limited.
- 6 September 2008: Apart from Mohammad Hafeez, the squad includes three other players with international experience - Misbah-ul-Haq, Yasir Arafat and Samiullah Khan.
- 4 September 2008: Virender Sehwag will lead a strong Delhi squad in the Mohammad Nissar Trophy, with Ashish Nehra returning from injury.

== Fixtures and results ==
15–18 September
Scorecard

| Sui Northern Gas Pipelines Limited | v | Delhi |
| 266 (78.3 overs); Khurram Shehzad 66 (136); Chetanya Nanda 3/24 (16 overs) | | 134 (36.3 overs); Virat Kohli 52 (83); Imran Ali 6/52 (15.3 overs) |
| | | 516/4 (124 overs); Virat Kohli 197* (274); Asad Ali 2/98 (36 overs) |

Match drawn (Sui Northern Gas Pipelines Limited won on 1st innings)
Feroz Shah Kotla, Delhi
Umpires: Sudhir Asnani (Ind) and Umesh Dubey (Ind)

- Delhi won the toss and chose to bat.
- No play on day 4 due to rain
- Sui Northern Gas Pipelines Limited won Nissar Trophy
