= Rohit Talwar =

Indian cricketer (1965–2014)

Personal information
- Born: 16 September 1965; Kanpur, India
- Died: 14 December 2014 (aged 49); Kanpur, India
- Source: Cricinfo, 29 March 2016

Rohit Talwar (16 September 1965 – 14 December 2014) was an Indian cricketer. He played 26 first-class matches for Madhya Pradesh between 1982 and 1990.

== See also ==
- List of Madhya Pradesh cricketers
