= Carlton Saldanha =

Indian cricketer

Personal information
- Born: 12 August 1962 (age 64); Bombay, Maharashtra, India
- Batting: Right-handed
- Role: Batsman

Domestic team information
- Years: Team
- 1980/81–1992/93: Karnataka

Career statistics
Competition	FC	List A
Matches	66	8
Runs scored	4,066	212
Batting average	45.68	30.28
100s/50s	7/26	0/1
Top score	144	62
Balls bowled	150	2
Wickets	1	0
Bowling average	130.00	–
5 wickets in innings	0	0
10 wickets in match	0	n/a
Best bowling	1/7	–
Catches/stumpings	51/–	0/–
- Source: ESPNcricinfo, 8 December 2015

Carlton Saldanha (born 12 August 1962) is a former Indian first-class cricketer who played for Karnataka cricket team from 1980/81 to 1992/93. He also played for India under-19 and under-25 teams. He was also formerly the director of the now defunct Frontiers Group India (FGI).

== Career ==
Saldanha was born in Bombay on 12 August 1962. He made his first-class cricket debut at the age of 18 during 1980–81 Ranji Trophy playing for Karnataka. During his playing career, which spanned between the 1980/81 and 1992/93 seasons, he appeared in 66 first-class matches and 8 List A matches. In 1981, he played two Youth Tests and one Youth ODI on India's Under-19 tour of England.

Saldanha was the leading run-getter of the 1986–87 Ranji Trophy with 782 runs at an average of more than 71. Between the 1986/87 and 1987/88 seasons, he was selected in the South Zone cricket team and the India Under-25 team.

His batting style was said to have been very similar to that of Sunil Gavaskar.

Saldanha currently works as the director of Frontiers Group India (FGI). Collaborating with the Karnataka State Cricket Association, Frontiers organized the first-ever Twenty20 tournament in India in 2004 involving some of the leading international cricketers. FGI also managed the 2009 and 2010 seasons of the Karnataka Premier League. According to Saldanha, "FGI has held the exclusive in-stadia advertising rights for over 60 per cent of the cricket grounds in India, since 2000 for all bilateral international cricket matches under the aegis of BCCI and has been successfully involved in over 130 international cricket matches – Test, ODIs and T20s."
