= Sumit Mathur =

Indian former cricketer (born 1981)

Personal information
- Full name: Sumit Omprakash Mathur
- Born: 26 November 1981 (age 44); Kota, Rajasthan, India
- Batting: Right-handed
- Source: ESPNcricinfo, 30 November 2016

Sumit Mathur (born 26 November 1981) is a former Indian first-class cricketer who represented Rajasthan. He made his first-class debut for Rajasthan in the 2002-03 Ranji Trophy on 9 November 2002.

== Early life and career ==
Born in Kota, Rajasthan, Mathur emerged through the state's youth system before making his senior debut. He played his first first-class match for Rajasthan on 9 November 2002, against Bengal during the 2002–03 Ranji Trophy. He subsequently made his List A debut in January 2004 in a match against Uttar Pradesh.

== Professional career ==
Mathur was noted for his consistency and ability to take wickets at a low average. During his career, he played 54 first-class matches, claiming 165 wickets at an average of 27.78. His career-best performance occurred in December 2011 during a Ranji Trophy match against Saurashtra, where he recorded figures of 6 for 33 in the second innings. This performance was instrumental in securing a 229-run victory for Rajasthan during their successful defense of the Ranji title.

In addition to his first-class success, Mathur played 29 List A matches, taking 38 wickets. His final first-class appearance for Rajasthan was against Tamil Nadu in January 2012.

== Personal life ==
Following his retirement from professional cricket, he has remained involved in the sport, occasionally appearing in veteran matches and local cricket initiatives in Northern India.
