= Sunil Chaturvedi =

Indian cricketer (born 1961)

Personal information
- Born: 5 July 1961 (age 65); Kanpur, India
- Source: Cricinfo, 7 April 2021

Sunil Chaturvedi (born 5 July 1961) is an Indian cricketer. He played in 72 first-class and 16 List A matches for Uttar Pradesh from 1979/80 to 1991/92.

== See also ==
- List of Uttar Pradesh cricketers
