= Brijesh Tomar =

Indian cricketer (born 1978)

Personal information
- Born: 18 January 1978 (age 48); Bhopal, India
- Source: ESPNcricinfo, 5 April 2021

Brijesh Tomar (born 18 January 1978) is an Indian cricketer. He played in 35 first-class and 12 List A matches for Madhya Pradesh from 2002 to 2008. He became captain of the team in 2007, and later became a match referee.

== See also ==
- List of Madhya Pradesh cricketers
