= List of India Twenty20 International wicket-keepers =

[ This is a chronological list of wicket-keepers who have played for India in Twenty20 International (T20I) matches since the team's first match on 1 December 2006, against South Africa. The wicket-keeper in that match was MS Dhoni, who holds the record for most dismissals, stumpings and catches in T20Is as a wicket-keeper.

== List ==
This list only includes players who have played as the designated keeper for a match. On occasions, another player may have stepped in to relieve the primary wicket-keeper due to injury or the keeper bowling.

Cap	Pyear	Year	Matches	Innings	Catches	Stumpings	Total	Ref
2	MS Dhoni	2006–2019	98	98	47	19	66	
32	Naman Ojha	2010	2	2	0	0	0	
37	Parthiv Patel	2011	2	1	1	0	1	
14	Robin Uthappa	2007–2015	13	2	1	0	1	
4	Dinesh Karthik	2006–2022	31	9	6	3	9	
68	Rishabh Pant	2017–2022	33	21	7	5	12	
55	Sanju Samson	2015–2022	10	3	0	2	2	
63	KL Rahul	2016–2022	49	8	4	1	5	
84	Ishan Kishan	2021–2022	3	1	0	1	1	
68	Jitesh Sharma	2017–2022	33	21	7	5	12	
68	Dhruv Jurel	2024–2024	33	21	7	5	12	

== See also ==
- List of India Test wicket-keepers
- List of India One Day International wicket-keepers
- List of India Twenty20 International cricketers
- List of India Twenty20 International cricket records
