= Rohit Jhalani =

Indian cricketer (born 1978)

Personal information
- Born: 1 September 1978 (age 48)
- Batting: Right-handed
- Role: Wicket-keeper

Domestic team information
- Years: Team
- 1997–2013: Rajasthan

Career statistics
Competition	FC	LA	T20
Matches	69	46	4
Runs scored	1847	497	85
Batting average	18.47	14.61	42.50
100s/50s	0/8	0/1	0/0
Top score	85	50	28
Catches/stumpings	215/19	58/14	2/3
- Source: ESPNcricinfo, 17 December 2014

Rohit Jhalani (born 1 September 1978) is a former Indian cricketer who played Indian domestic cricket for Rajasthan Cricket Team from 1997 to 2011. He is one of the few selected wicket-keepers in India who has taken more than 200 stump outs in various first-class cricket tournaments in India. He is a certified fitness coach from BCCI and currently spends his time and energy in coaching cricket & fitness to youngsters.

Rohit was also a convener in the JDCA Ad hoc committee 2018 and has also been elected as an executive member of Rajasthan Players Association.

Jhalanihas played 69 First-Class and 46 List-A matches since year 1997. He represented Rajasthan and Central zone in Ranji Trophy, Duleep Trophy, and Irani Trophy.

Internationally, Rohit has played as a captain-cum-coach for Magpies Cricket Club in Queensland, Australia and was awarded the best cricketer by Mackay Cricket Association in the year 2012–13. In England, he represented Rajasthan Colts tour in the year 1998.

== Achievements ==
- Best Wicket keeping Performance in Ranji Trophy in Year 2002 – 03
- Best Wicket keeping Performance in Duleep Trophy in Year 2001 – 02
- National Record of taking 8 Victims in debut match of Duleep trophy for Central Zone Year 2000 – 01
- Selected for the First batch of National Cricket Academy [N.C.A.] at Bangalore in year 2000–2001

== Awards and Honour ==
- Awarded “Best Cricketer of Rajasthan” award from Sir Mathura Das Mathur Trust, Rajasthan year 2002
