= Jaspal Singh (cricketer) =

Indian cricketer (1968–2015)

Personal information
- Born: 6 June 1968; Delhi, India
- Died: 12 November 2015 (aged 47); Australia
- Source: ESPNcricinfo, 23 March 2016

Jaspal Singh (6 June 1968 – 12 November 2015) was an Indian first-class cricketer. He played for Delhi and Punjab.
