= Vedraj Chauhan =

Indian cricketer

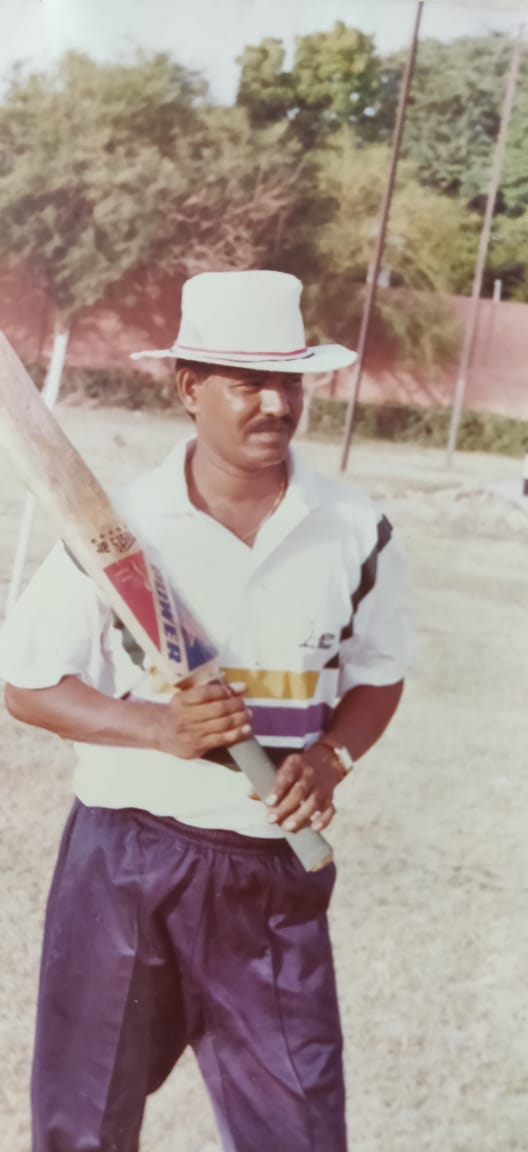

Personal information
- Full name: Vedraj Chauhan
- Born: 1 April 1961 (age 65); Jalandhar, India
- Batting: Right-handed
- Role: Wicket-keeper

Career statistics
Competition	First-class	List A
Matches	63	16
Runs scored	1,806	140
Batting average	19.21	17.50
100s/50s	0/5	0/1
Top score	67	60
Balls bowled	24	–
Wickets	0	–
Bowling average	–	–
5 wickets in innings	–	–
10 wickets in match	–	–
Best bowling	–	–
Catches/stumpings	104/51	8/4
- Source: CricInfo, 2 February 2014

Vedraj Chauhan (born 1 April 1961) is a retired Indian cricketer. He captained the Indian under-19 cricket team on three occasions. He was born in Jalandhar in 1961.
