= Vinod Mathur =

Indian cricketer (born 1953)

Personal information
- Full name: Vinod Mathur
- Born: 11 October 1953 (age 73); Jaipur, Rajasthan
- Batting: Right-handed
- Bowling: Right-arm medium-fast
- Role: All-rounder
- Source: ESPNcricinfo

Vinod Mathur (born 11 November 1953 in Jaipur, Rajasthan) is an Indian computer hardware engineer who played for the Rajasthan cricket team from 1971 to 1985. He played 83 first-class and four List A matches. He was named in Rajasthan High Court panel of selectors for selection of senior cricket teams.
