= Ram Singh (cricketer) =

Indian cricketer

Ram Singh was an Indian cricketer who played for Gwalior.

Singh made a single first-class appearance for the side, during the 1943–44 season, against Delhi. From the lower-middle order, he scored a duck in the first innings in which he batted, and six runs in the second. From eight overs of bowling, he took figures of 1-34.
