= Kishore Sharma =

Indian cricketer (born 1963)

Personal information
- Born: 20 December 1963 (age 62); Meerut, India
- Source: ESPNcricinfo, 13 April 2021

Kishore Sharma (born 20 December 1963) is an Indian cricketer. He played in 32 first-class and 9 List A matches from 1984/85 to 1992/93.

== See also ==
- List of Uttar Pradesh cricketers
