= Vishal Yadav =

Indian cricketer (born 1967)

Personal information
- Born: 14 December 1967 (age 58); Faridabad, India
- Source: Cricinfo, 3 April 2016

Vishal Yadav (born 14 December 1967) is an Indian former cricketer. He played first-class cricket for Bengal and Uttar Pradesh.

== See also ==
- List of Bengal cricketers
