= Karim Chishti =

Indian cricketer (1936–2010)

Personal information
- Born: 15 April 1936; Lahore, Punjab Province, British India
- Died: 13 May 2010 (aged 74); Lucknow, Uttar Pradesh, India
- Source: ESPNcricinfo, 7 April 2021

Karim Chishti (15 April 1936 – 13 May 2010) was an Indian cricketer. He played in twenty-five first-class matches for Uttar Pradesh from 1963/64 to 1974/75.

== See also ==
- List of Uttar Pradesh cricketers
