= List of India Test wicket-keepers =

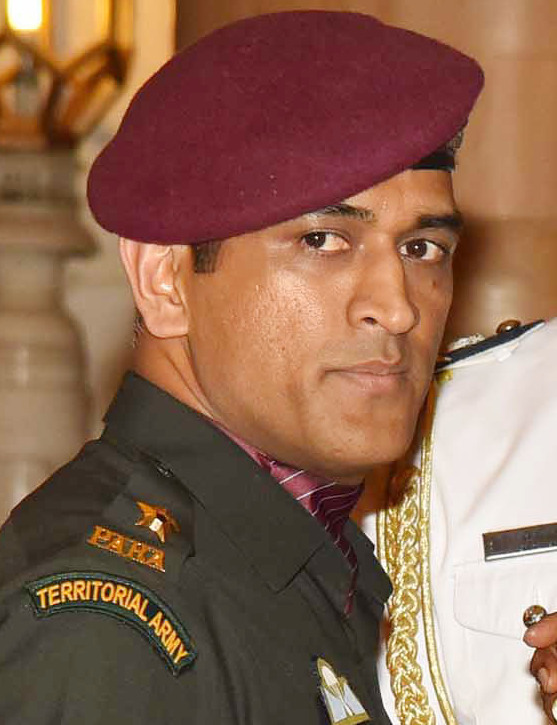
Mahendra Singh Dhoni, holds the record for most dismissals by an Indian wicket-keeper in Test cricket

This is a chronological list of India Test wicket-keepers.

This list only includes players who have played as the designated keeper for a match. On occasions, another player may have stepped in to relieve the primary wicket-keeper due to injury or the keeper bowling.

== List ==
Test Match Career

No.	Player	Test career	Tests	Catches	Stumpings	Total dismissals
1	Janardan Navle	1932–1933	2	1	0	1
2	Dilawar Hussain	1934–1936	3	6	1	7
3	Dattaram Hindlekar	1936–1946	4	3	0	3
4	Khershed Meherhomji	1936	1	1	0	1
5	Jenni Irani	1947	2	2	1	3
6	Khokhan Sen	1948–1952	14	20	11	31
7	Nana Joshi	1951–1960	12	18	9	27
8	Madhav Mantri	1951–1952	3	6	1	7
9	Vijay Rajindernath	1952	1	0	4	4
10	Ebrahim Maka	1952–1953	2	2	1	3
11	Vijay Manjrekar	1953	1	2	2	4
12	Naren Tamhane	1955–1961	21	35	16	51
13	Chandrakant Patankar	1955–1956	1	3	1	4
14	Budhi Kunderan	1960–1967	15	21	7	28
15	Farokh Engineer	1961–1975	46	66	16	82
16	Prince Indrajitsinhji	1964–1969	4	6	3	9
17	Pochiah Krishnamurthy	1971	5	7	1	8
18	Syed Kirmani	1976–1986	88	160	38	198
19	Bharath Reddy	1979	4	9	2	11
20	Sadanand Viswanath	1985	3	11	0	11
21	Kiran More	1986–1993	49	110	20	130
22	Chandrakant Pandit	1986–1992	3	11	2	13
23	Vijay Yadav	1993	1	1	2	3
24	Nayan Mongia	1994–2001	44	99	8	107
25	Mannava Prasad	1999–2000	6	15	0	15
26	Saba Karim	2000	1	1	0	1
27	Vijay Dahiya	2000	2	6	0	6
28	Sameer Dighe	2001	6	12	2	14
29	Deep Dasgupta	2001–2002	8	13	0	13
30	Ajay Ratra	2002	6	11	2	13
31	Parthiv Patel	2002–2018	25	62	10	72
32	Dinesh Karthik	2004–2018	19	51	6	57
33	Mahendra Singh Dhoni	2005–2014	90	256	38	294
34	Wriddhiman Saha	2012–2021	40	92	12	104
35	KL Rahul	2014–present	50	9	0	9
36	Naman Ojha	2015–2015	1	4	1	5
37	Rishabh Pant	2018–present	43	149	15	164
38	Kona Srikar Bharat	2023–present	7	18	1	19
39	Ishan Kishan	2023–present	2	5	0	5
40	Dhruv Jurel	2024–present	3	5	2	7

== See also ==
- List of India One Day International wicket-keepers
- List of India Twenty-20 wicket-keepers
