= Suthar Bhagwandas =

Indian cricketer (born 1943)

Personal information
- Born: 15 July 1943 (age 83); Indore, India
- Source: Cricinfo, 5 April 2021

Suthar Bhagwandas (born 15 July 1943) is an Indian cricketer. He played in 66 first-class matches for Madhya Pradesh from 1958/59 to 1978/79. In January 1959, at the age of 15 years and 188 days, he became the youngest Indian cricketer to take a five-wicket haul in a first-class match.

== See also ==
- List of Madhya Pradesh cricketers
