= Haseen Ahmed =

Indian cricketer (born 1954)

Personal information
- Born: 10 January 1954 (age 72); Allahabad, India
- Source: ESPNcricinfo, 28 March 2016

Haseen Ahmed (born 10 January 1954) is an Indian former cricketer. He played first-class cricket for Bengal and Uttar Pradesh.

== See also ==
- List of Bengal cricketers
