= Surendra Malviya =

Indian cricketer (born 1994)

Personal information
- Full name: Surendra Ramdas Malviya
- Born: 15 November 1994 (age 31); Vidisha, Madhya Pradesh, India
- Batting: Right-handed
- Bowling: Right-arm medium
- Role: All-rounder

Domestic team information
- Years: Team
- 2014; 2021: Madhya Pradesh
- Source: ESPNcricinfo, 20 April 2016

Surendra Ramdas Malviya (born 15 November 1994) is an Indian first-class cricketer who played for Madhya Pradesh. He made his Twenty20 debut on 11 January 2021, for Madhya Pradesh in the 2020–21 Syed Mushtaq Ali Trophy.
