= Narendra Dua =

Indian cricketer (born 1939)

Personal information
- Born: 16 October 1939 (age 87); Sargodha, Pakistan
- Relatives: Sanjeev Dua (son)
- Source: ESPNcricinfo, 5 April 2021

Narendra Dua (born 16 October 1939) is an Indian cricketer. He played in 29 first-class matches for Madhya Pradesh from 1963/64 to 1974/75. After his cricket career, he became a divisional chairman for the Madhya Pradesh Cricket Association. His son, Sanjeev, is a former cricket umpire.

== See also ==
- List of Madhya Pradesh cricketers
