= Kishan Kala =

Indian cricketer (born 1965)

Personal information
- Born: 5 February 1965 (age 61); Allahabad, India
- Source: ESPNcricinfo, 7 April 2021

Kishan Kala (born 5 February 1965) is an Indian cricketer. He played in 45 first-class and 8 List A matches from 1982/83 to 1993/94.

== See also ==
- List of Uttar Pradesh cricketers
