= Rajinder Hans =

Indian cricketer

Personal information
- Full name: Rajinder Singh Hans
- Born: 10 March 1953 (age 73); Bombay, Maharashtra, India
- Batting: Left-handed
- Bowling: Slow left-arm orthodox

Domestic team information
- Years: Team
- 1976-77 to 1986-87: Uttar Pradesh
- 1976-77 to 1984-85: Central Zone

Career statistics
Competition	FC	List A
Matches	78	21
Runs scored	608	58
Batting average	11.92	9.66
100s/50s	0/0	0/0
Top score	48	12
Balls bowled	19,620	1266
Wickets	340	26
Bowling average	22.13	29.92
5 wickets in innings	27	0
10 wickets in match	5	–
Best bowling	9/152	3/15
Catches/stumpings	36/–	7/–
- Source: Cricinfo, 27 January 2015

Rajinder Singh Hans (born 10 March 1953) is a former Indian first-class cricketer and coach. He was a slow left-arm orthodox bowler and played for Uttar Pradesh between 1976–77 and 1986–87, taking 340 first-class wickets.

Hans moved from his birthplace in Bombay to work for Mohan Meakin in Ghaziabad in Uttar Pradesh. In the Ranji Trophy final at Narendra Mohan Sports Stadium against Karnataka in 1977–78, he took 9 for 152, which remain the best figures for Ranji Trophy finals; nevertheless, Uttar Pradesh lost by an innings. He played for Central Zone against touring teams and in the Duleep Trophy from 1976–77 to 1984–85. He was part of the Indian Test squad against the touring Australian team during the 1979–80 series in India, but Dilip Doshi was preferred for the Test team.

Hans was the coach of Uttar Pradesh from 2001–02 to 2006–07. Under his coaching, Uttar Pradesh won the Ranji Trophy in 2005–06 for the first time. He coached Jharkhand in the Ranji Trophy team in 2007–08. He was a member of the All India Junior Selection Committee for two years, 2008–09 and 2009–10. In September 2012 he was appointed as the national selector from the Central Zone.
