= Mukul Dagar =

Indian cricketer (born 1990)

Personal information
- Born: 17 December 1990 (age 35); Delhi, India
- Batting: Left-handed
- Role: Opening batsman

Domestic team information
- Years: Team
- 2010–2011: Haryana
- 2011–present: Uttar Pradesh

Career statistics
Competition	FC	LA	T20
Matches	19	7	5
Runs scored	1118	116	174
Batting average	37.26	16.57	43.50
100s/50s	3/4	0/1	0/1
Top score	126	50	99*
Catches/stumpings	11/–	2/–	0/–
- Source: ESPNcricinfo, 26 December 2013

Mukul Dagar (born 17 December 1990) is a cricketer who plays for Uttar Pradesh in Indian domestic cricket. Dagar is a left-hand opening batsman who has also played for India Under-19 cricket team.

He made his first-class debut against Karnataka in December 2011 at Shimoga, scoring 37.
