= Suresh Deo =

Indian cricket umpire (born 1946)

Personal information
- Born: 20 March 1946 (age 80)

Umpiring information
- ODIs umpired: 1 (1996)
- Source: Cricinfo, 18 May 2014

Suresh D. Deo (born 20 March 1946) is an Indian former cricket umpire. He mainly umpired at the first-class level. The only international match he officiated in was a single One Day International in 1996.

== See also ==
- List of One Day International cricket umpires
