= Roop Singh (cricketer) =

Indian cricketer

Roop Singh was an Indian cricketer who played for Gwalior.

During the 1943–44 season, Singh made one first-class appearance for the team, against Delhi. He batted in the upper-middle order and scored four runs in the first inning and a duck in the second.
