= Narendra Bagatheria =

Indian cricketer (born 1950)

Personal information
- Born: 18 December 1950 (age 75); Indore, India
- Source: ESPNcricinfo, 5 April 2021

Narendra Bagatheria (born 18 December 1950) is an Indian cricketer. He played in 46 first-class matches for Madhya Pradesh from 1969/70 to 1983/84.

== See also ==
- List of Madhya Pradesh cricketers
