= Mahendra Shukla =

Indian cricketer

Mahendra Shukla is a former Indian first-class cricketer.

Despite having a first-class career spanning just seven games, Shukla appeared for three teams during his career, which started during the 1947–48 season for Holkar.

Having appeared in three Ranji trophy matches in his debut season, he played a single game in 1948-49 for United Provinces, before moving, in 1949–50, to his final team, Uttar Pradesh. He completed his Mechanical Engineering from Banaras Hindu University.

From eleven first-class innings, Shukla top-scored with 90 against Assam, his only half-century in first-class cricket.

After retiring from Indian Oil Corporation, Mahendra Shukla was residing in Navi Mumbai until his death on 10 September 2017.

== Images ==
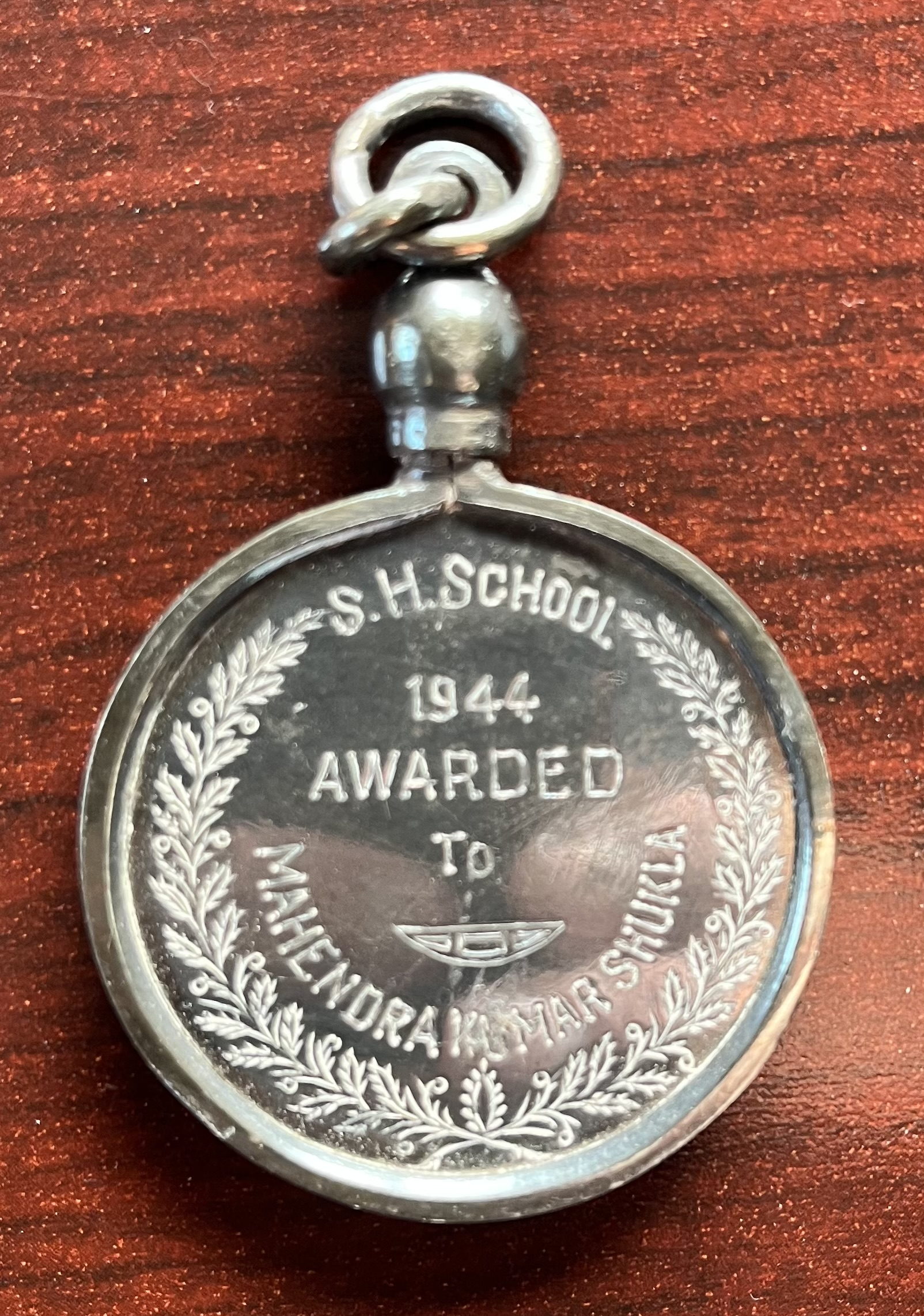
S.H. School medal

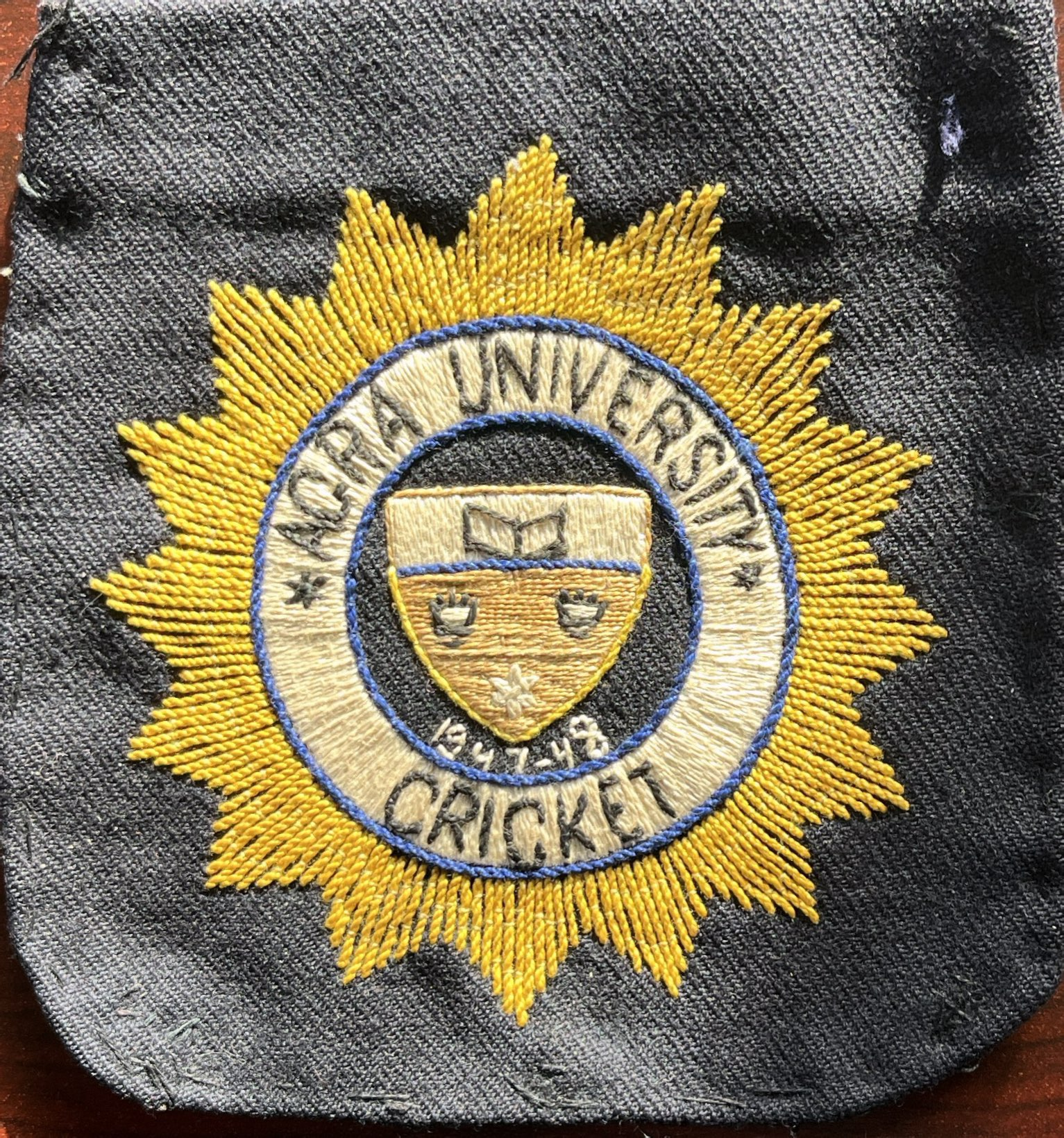
Team badge 1947-48

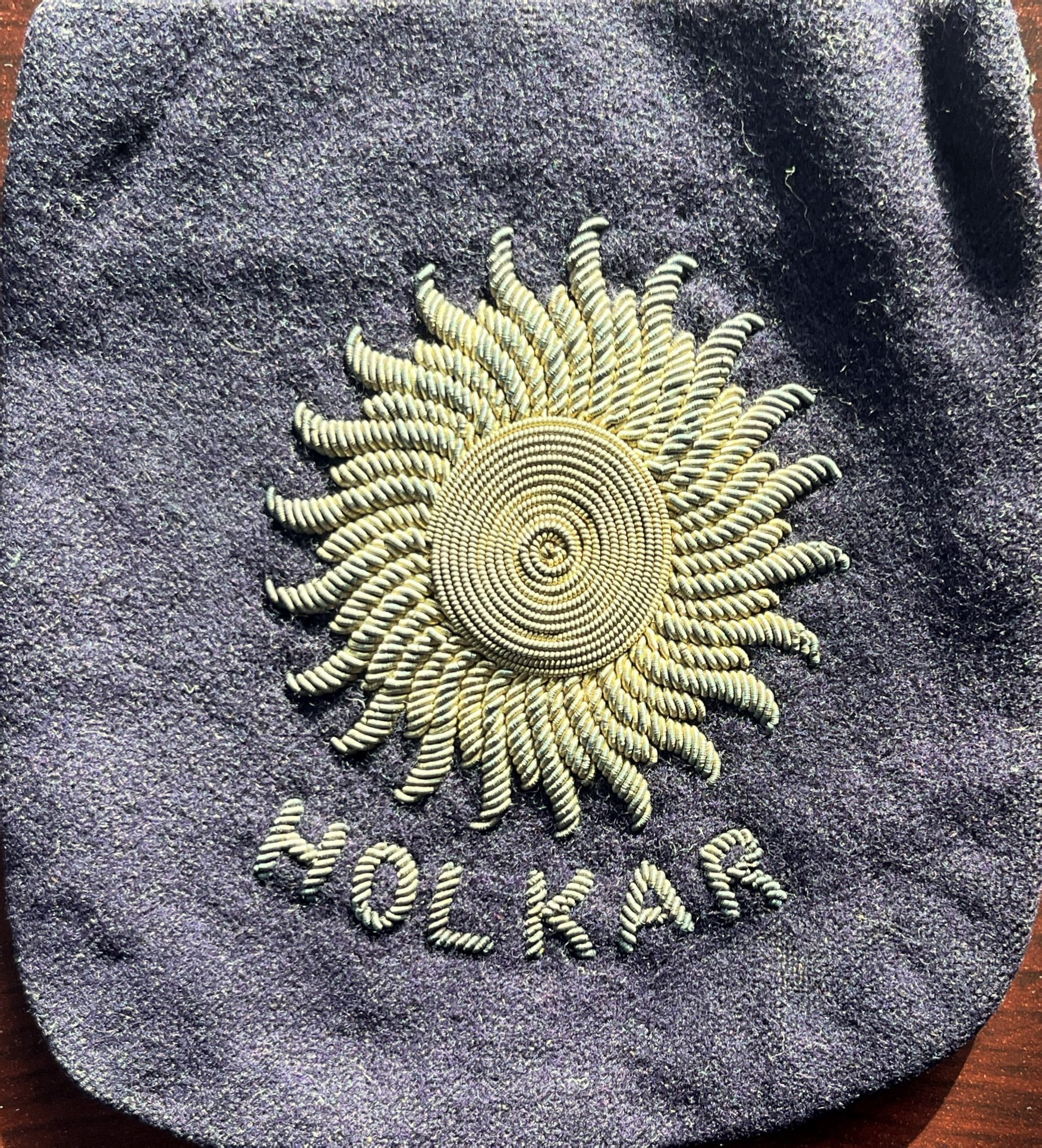
Holkar team badge

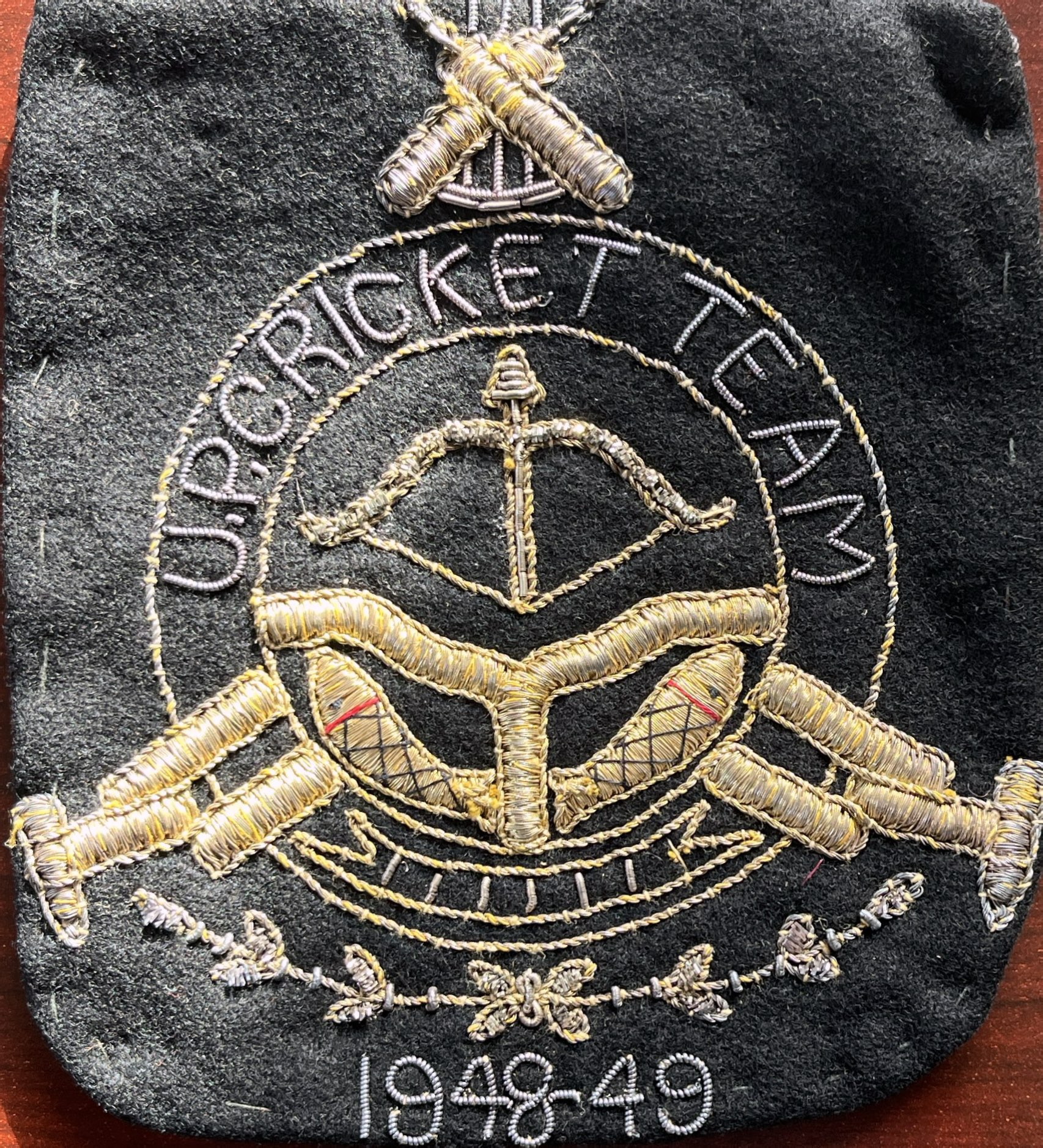
Team badge 1948-49

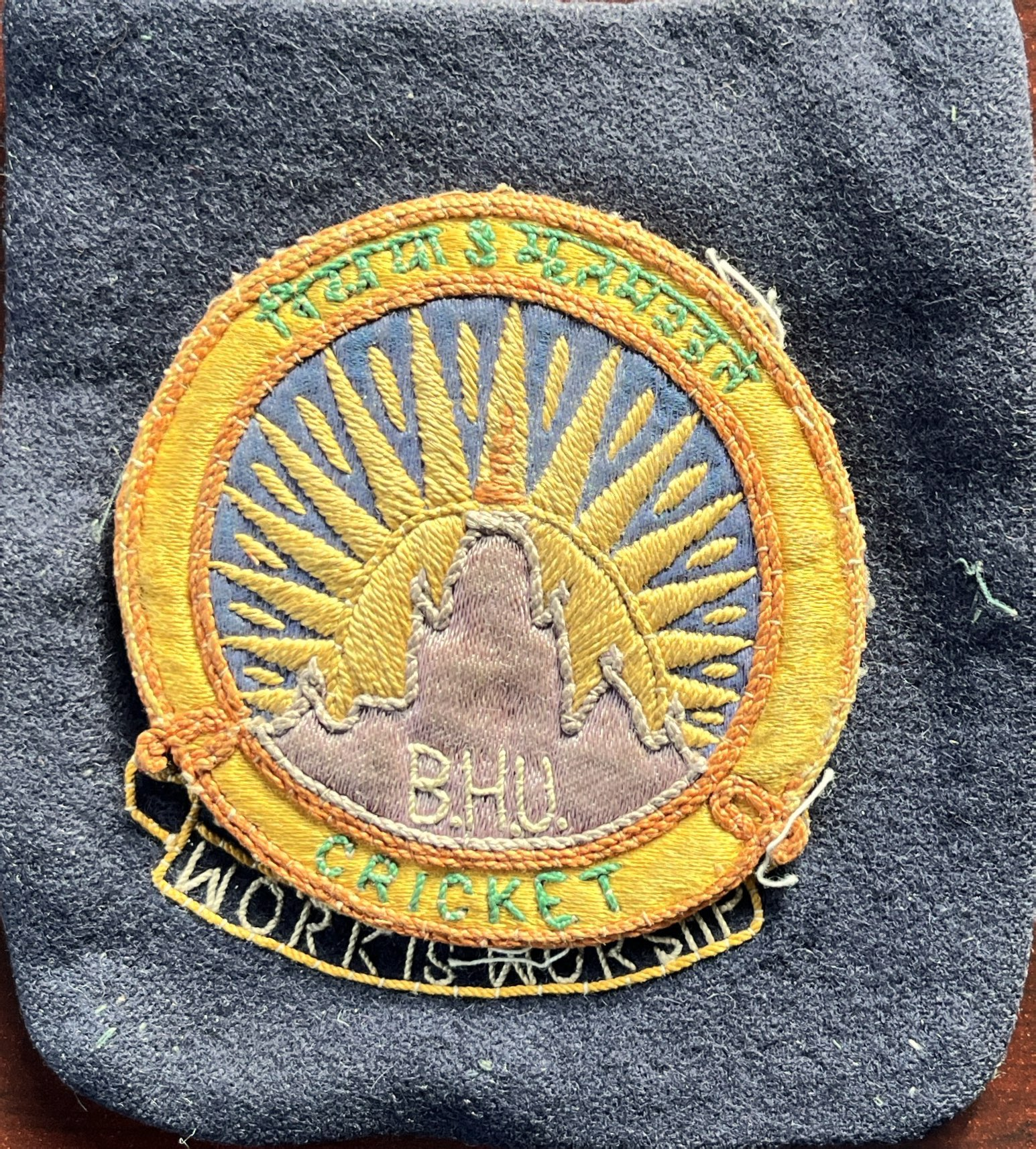
Team badge

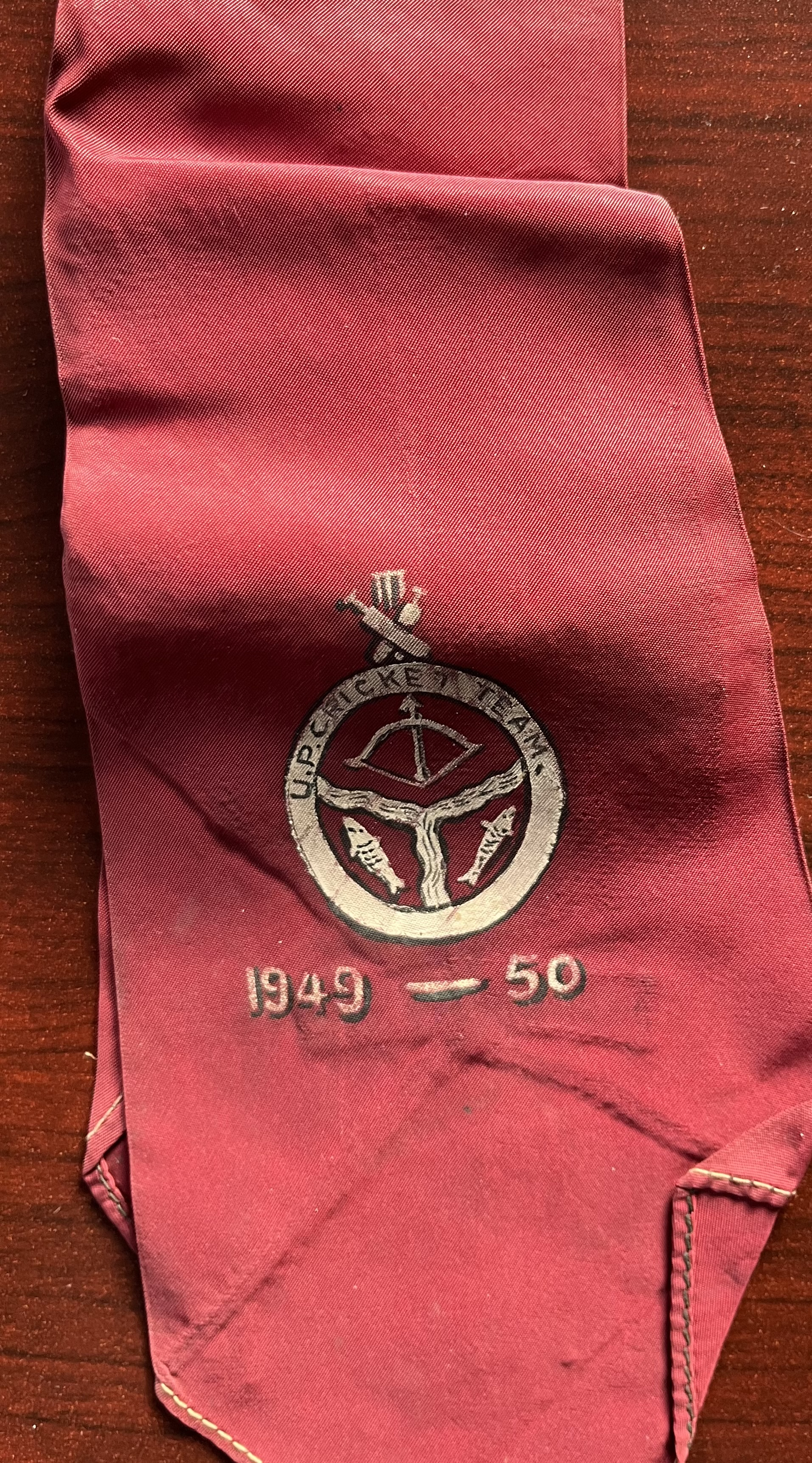
Team tie 1949-50

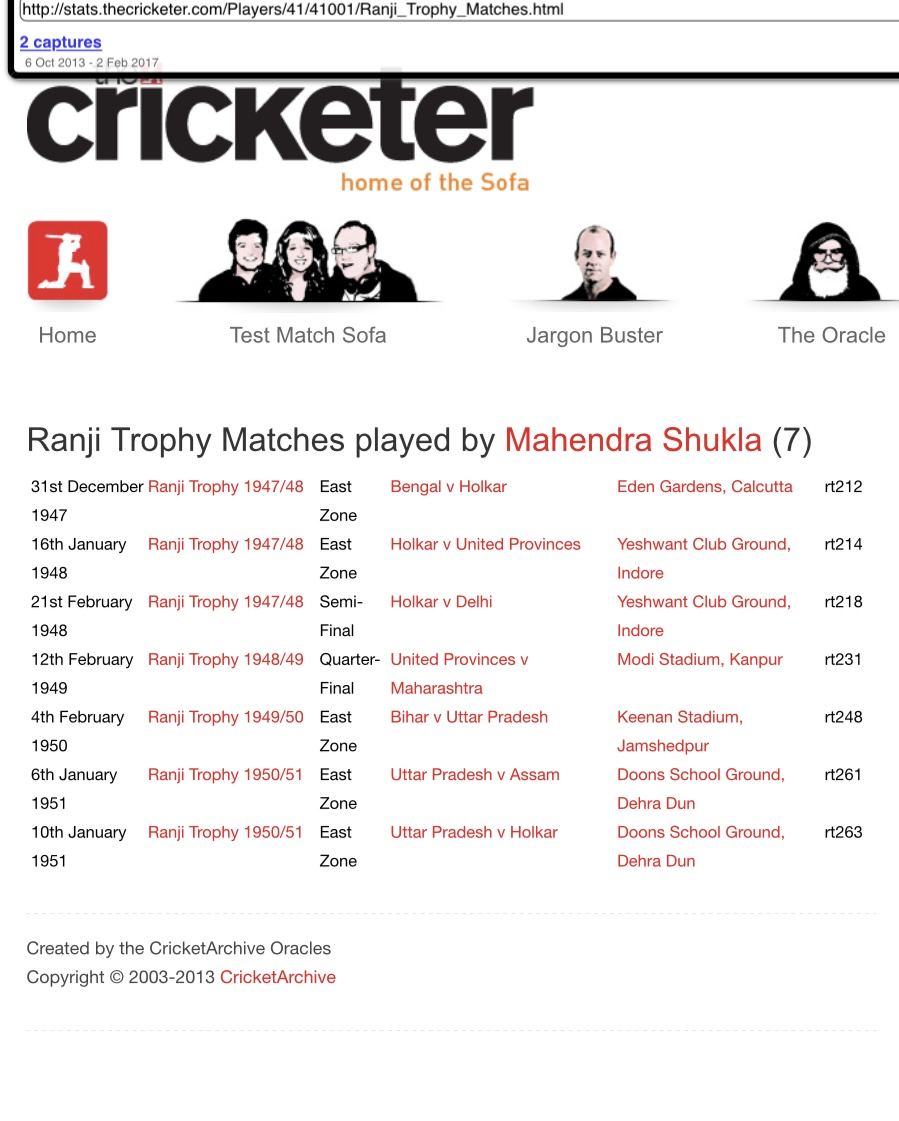
List of Ranji matches played

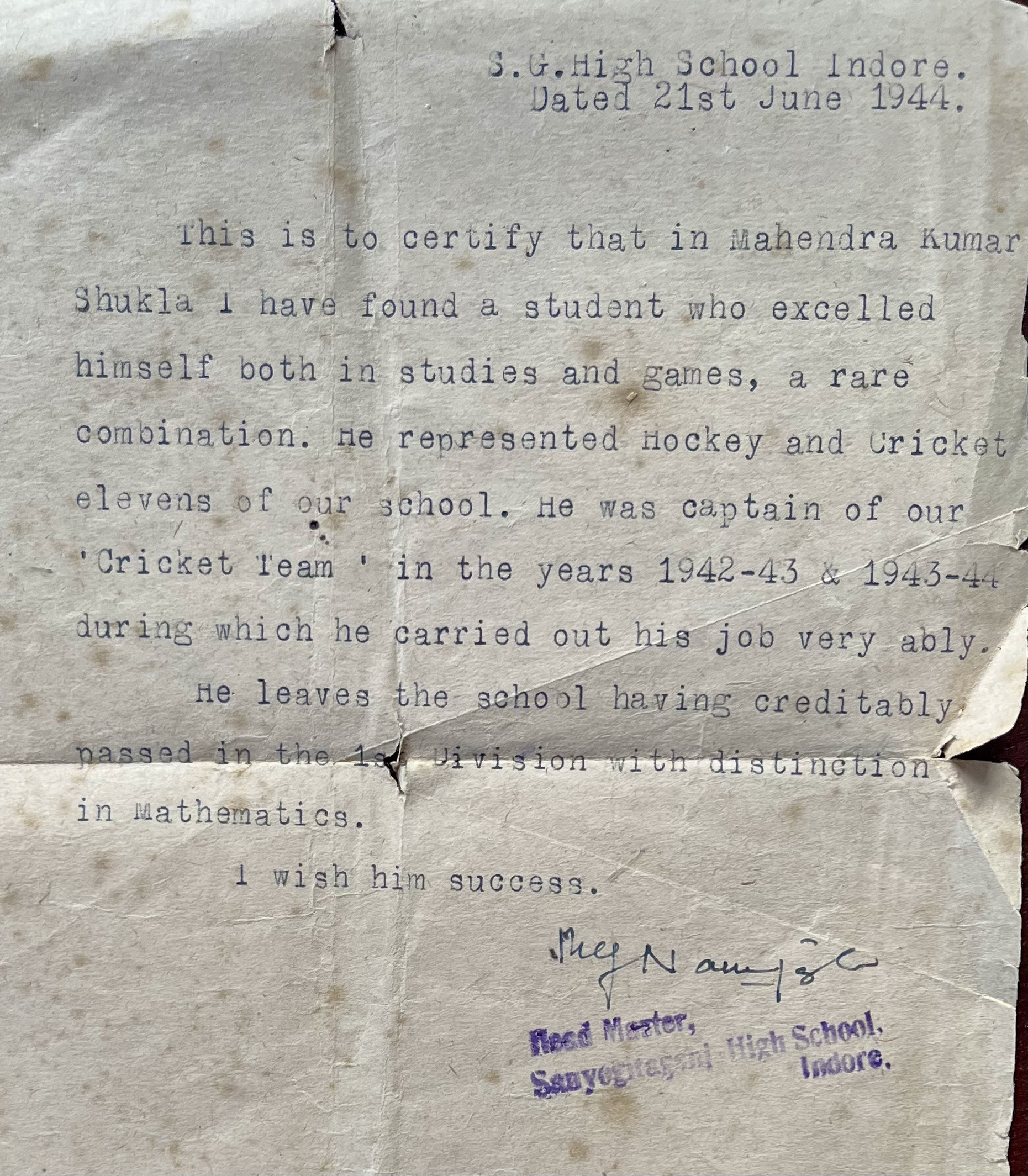
S.G. High School HM letter June 1944

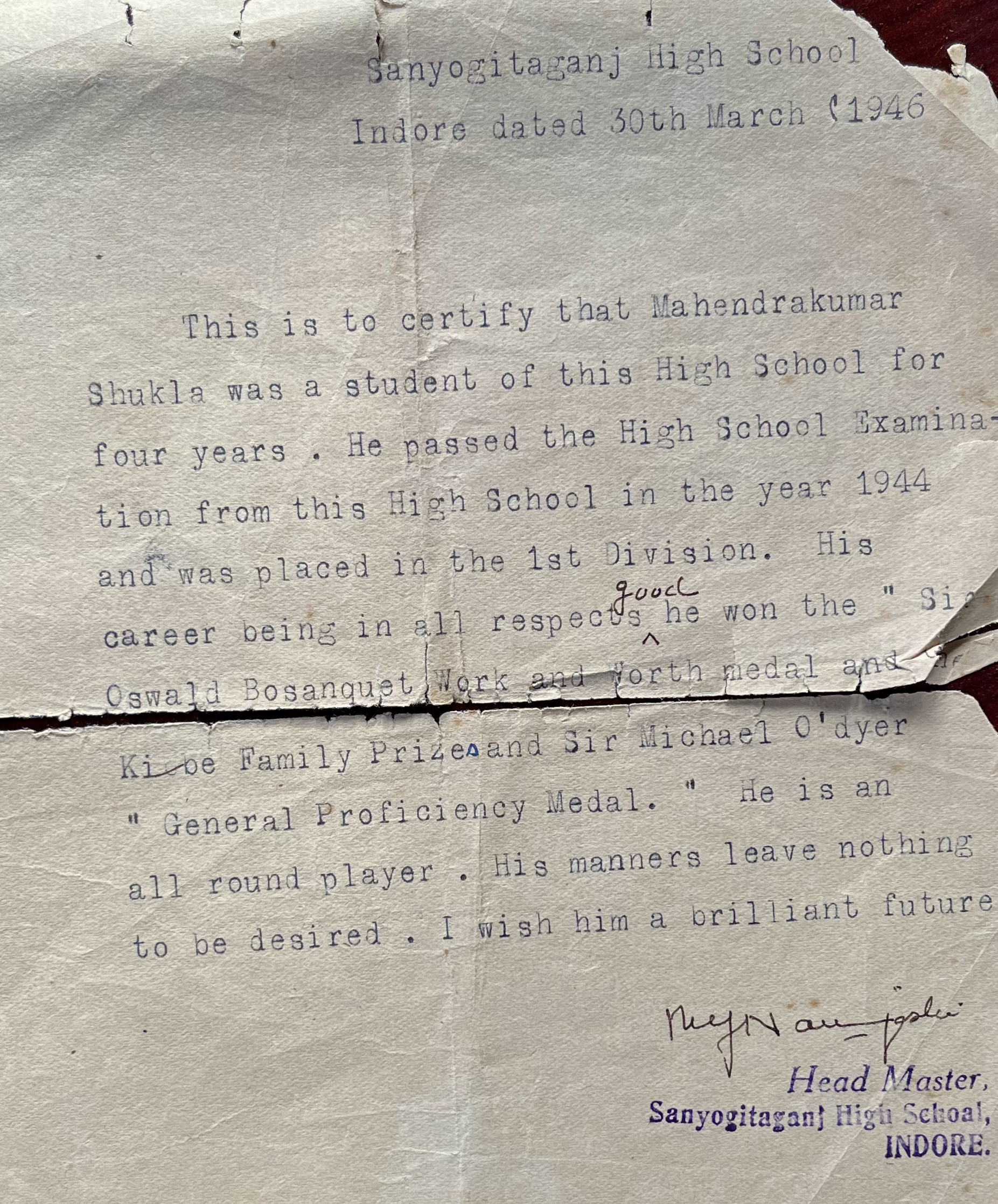
S.G. High School HM letter March 1946
