= Rizwan Shamshad =

Indian cricketer (born 1972)

Personal information
- Born: 19 November 1972 (age 53); Aligarh, Uttar Pradesh, India
- Nickname: Pintu
- Batting: Right-handed
- Bowling: Right-arm medium-fast

Domestic team information
- Years: Team
- 1990–2006: Uttar Pradesh

Career statistics
Competition	FC	LA
Matches	108	69
Runs scored	7,018	1,834
Batting average	45.86	29.11
100s/50s	19/37	1/10
Top score	224*	100
Balls bowled	1,707	588
Wickets	14	19
Bowling average	65.57	27.42
5 wickets in innings	0	0
10 wickets in match	0	n/a
Best bowling	2/37	4/35
Catches/stumpings	80/–	27/–
- Source: Cricinfo, 26 December 2017

Rizwan Shamshad (born 19 November 1972) is an Indian first class cricketer. A right-handed batsman, Rizwan played for Uttar Pradesh. He made his first class debut in 1990/91 and has made 100 appearances in Indian domestic cricket with over 7000 runs, with 19 centuries and 37 half centuries averaging more than 45 runs in his career innings.

He is batting coach of the Uttar Pradesh Cricket Association.
