= Sunil Lahore =

Indian former first-class cricketer (born 1965)

Personal information
- Full name: Sunil Shamlal Lahore
- Born: 31 December 1965 (age 60); Indore, Madhya Pradesh, India
- Batting: Left-handed
- Bowling: Slow left-arm orthodox

Domestic team information
- Years: Team
- 1985/86–2000/01: Madhya Pradesh

Career statistics
Competition	FC	List A
Matches	79	19
Runs scored	1,470	50
Batting average	17.29	4.54
100s/50s	0/4	0/0
Top score	57	11
Balls bowled	18,781	1,044
Wickets	230	22
Bowling average	31.75	32.31
5 wickets in innings	8	0
10 wickets in match	1	n/a
Best bowling	8/100	4/56
Catches/stumpings	30/–	1/–
- Source: ESPNcricinfo, 7 February 2016

Sunil Shamlal Lahore (born 31 December 1965) is an Indian former first-class cricketer who played for Madhya Pradesh between the 1985/86 and 2000/01 seasons. After retirement, he worked as a cricket coach and selector.

== Career ==
Lahore was a slow left-arm orthodox spinner who played for Madhya Pradesh cricket team for 16 seasons from 1985/86 and 2000/01. He appeared in 79 first-class matches in which he took 230 wickets and 19 List A matches in which he had 22 scalps to his name. Lahore was the leading wicket-taker of the 1986–87 Ranji Trophy, his second first-class season, with 32 wickets at an average of 17.62. During his career, he was part of the Madhya Pradesh spin trio (along with leg spinner Narendra Hirwani and off spinner Rajesh Chauhan), with Madhya Pradesh playing most of their home matches on slow tracks. He also played for Central Zone in Duleep Trophy and Deodhar Trophy between 1986/87 and 1991/92.

Lahore continued to be associated with cricket after his playing career. He coached cricketers and also started a cricket academy. He worked as a selector for the Madhya Pradesh Cricket Association (MPCA). He is a life member of MPCA and has worked as a representative of the Association in various meetings.
