= Rahul Sapru =

Indian cricketer

Personal information
- Full name: Rahul Vijay Sapru
- Born: 13 June 1964 (age 62); Kanpur, Uttar Pradesh, India
- Batting: Right-handed
- Bowling: Right-arm off break

Domestic team information
- Years: Team
- 1982/83–1998/99: Uttar Pradesh

Career statistics
Competition	FC	List A
Matches	98	42
Runs scored	6,007	901
Batting average	49.23	25.74
100s/50s	18/29	0/5
Top score	200*	78*
Balls bowled	1,670	547
Wickets	19	12
Bowling average	41.00	32.58
5 wickets in innings	1	0
10 wickets in match	0	n/a
Best bowling	5/30	2/10
Catches/stumpings	73/–	14/–
- Source: ESPNcricinfo, 14 January 2016

Rahul Sapru (born 13 June 1964) is an Indian former first-class cricketer who played for Uttar Pradesh. After retirement, he worked as a selector for Uttar Pradesh and in the technical committee of the Board of Control for Cricket in India.

== Career ==
A right-handed batsman and occasional off break bowler, Sapru made his first-class debut for Uttar Pradesh at the age of 18 during the 1982–83 Ranji Trophy. He went on to represent the team over 16 subsequent seasons, also captaining in many matches. Playing for Central Zone in the 1996–97 Duleep Trophy, Sapru made 85 and 100 not out in the semifinal against West Zone, followed by a match-winning second-innings 161 in the final against South Zone which helped his team register a 161-run win. He played a total of 98 first-class matches in his career, scoring over 6000 runs at an average of over 49 along with 18 centuries.

Sapru became a member of the five-member senior selection committee of Uttar Pradesh Cricket Association in 2010. He has worked for the Board of Control for Cricket in India as a Central Zone representative of the technical committee. He has also worked as a match referee in domestic matches.
