= Mohammad Kaif =

Indian cricketer (born 1980)

Personal information
- Born: 1 December 1980 (age 45); Allahabad, Uttar Pradesh, India
- Height: 5 ft 11 in (1.80 m)
- Batting: Right-handed
- Bowling: Right-arm off break
- Role: All-rounder
- Relatives: Mohammad Tarif (father); Mohammad Saif (brother); Pooja Yadav (Spouse)

International information
- National side: India (2000–2006)
- Test debut (cap 228): 2 March 2000 v South Africa
- Last Test: 30 June 2006 v West Indies
- ODI debut (cap 142): 28 January 2002 v England
- Last ODI: 29 November 2006 v South Africa

Domestic team information
- Years: Team
- 1998–2014: Uttar Pradesh
- 2014–2016: Andhra
- 2008–2009: Rajasthan Royals
- 2010: Kings XI Punjab
- 2011–2012: Royal Challengers Bangalore
- 2016–2018: Chhattisgarh

Career statistics
Competition	Test	ODI	FC	LA
Matches	13	125	186	269
Runs scored	624	2,753	10,229	7,763
Batting average	32.84	32.01	38.60	37.68
100s/50s	1/3	2/17	19/59	6/59
Top score	148*	111*	202*	151*
Balls bowled	18	0	1,484	1,166
Wickets	0	0	20	33
Bowling average	–	–	35.75	30.57
5 wickets in innings	–	–	0	0
10 wickets in match	–	–	0	0
Best bowling	–	–	3/4	4/23
Catches/stumpings	14/–	55/–	170/–	125/–
Medal record
Men's Cricket
Representing India
ICC Cricket World Cup
Runner-up	2003 South Africa-Zimbabwe-Kenya
ICC Champions Trophy
Winner	2002 Sri Lanka
ICC Under-19 Cricket World Cup
Winner	2000 Sri Lanka
ACC Asia Cup
Runner-up	2004 Sri Lanka
- Source: ESPNcricinfo, 3 April 2023

Mohammad Kaif (born 1 December 1980) is a former Indian cricketer, who represented India in Test cricket and One Day Internationals, He is noted for his fielding ability and for captaining the India national under-19 cricket team at the 2000 ICC Under-19 Cricket World Cup. He retired from all formats of cricket on 13 July 2018.

== Personal life ==
Kaif was born on 1 December 1980 in Allahabad, Uttar Pradesh, India. Kaif began his cricketing development at Green Park Stadium, in Kanpur. His father, Mohammad Tarif Ansari, played for the Railways cricket team and the Uttar Pradesh cricket team. His brother, Mohammad Saif, also played for Madhya Pradesh and Uttar Pradesh cricket team.

Kaif married Pooja Yadav, a Noida-based journalist, in 2011. They have two children: a son named Kabir and a daughter named Eva.

== Domestic career ==
Kaif played first-class cricket for Uttar Pradesh from 1998 to 2014, captaining both the Uttar Pradesh side and the Central Zone. He subsequently represented Andhra (2014–2016) and Chhattisgarh (2016–2018). His usual batting position in domestic cricket was number three.

== International career ==
=== Rise though age-group cricket ===
Kaif was selected for the senior India side on the basis of his performances at Under-19 level. He captained the India Under-19 team to victory at the 2000 ICC Under-19 Cricket World Cup and was subsequently selected in the inaugural intake of the National Cricket Academy in Bangalore.

=== Test career ===
Kaif made his Test debut against South Africa in Bangalore on 2 March 2000, becoming one of the youngest cricketers from Uttar Pradesh to represent India at international level. He was dropped from the Test side following a period of inconsistent performances but returned to the team against Australia in late 2004, scoring two half-centuries.

In March 2006, Kaif was recalled to the Test side in place of the injured Yuvraj Singh for the First Test against England in Nagpur, where he top-scored with 91. He retained his place in the four Tests in the West Indies, following an injury to Sachin Tendulkar and recorded his maiden Test century - 148 not out - in the second Test. He played his last Test on 30 June 2006 against the West Indies.

=== ODI career ===
Kaif made his ODI debut against England on 28 January 2002. He was a member of the Indian team that shared the 2002 ICC Champions Trophy with Sri Lanka, and was part of the squad that reached the final of the 2003 Cricket World Cup.

His most notable ODI performance came in the final of the 2002 NatWest Series against England at Lord's, where he scored an unbeaten 87 off 75 balls to help India chase down a target of 326, earning him the Man of the Match award. He was also named Man of the Series during India's ODI series against Bangladesh in late 2004, following consistent performances across all three matches.

Kaif also captained the Indian ODI side in the 2005–06 Challenger Trophy in the absence of regular captain Rahul Dravid. He was dropped from the ODI team in late 2006, and a recall to the Test squad in April 2008 for the series against South Africa did not result in a playing appearance.

=== Fielding ===
Kaif was widely regarded as one of India's premier outfielders, particularly in the covers, known for his speed and throwing accuracy. He holds the record for the most catches by a fielder in a single Cricket World Cup match — four catches — taken against Sri Lanka at Johannesburg on 10 March 2003.

=== Batting style and role ===
Kaif was predominantly deployed in the middle order by India's team management, though his most productive performances came when he batted higher in the order, at number three. Competition for the number three position from Rahul Dravid, Yuvraj Singh, and Suresh Raina, combined with the appointment of Greg Chappell as coach and the emergence of Mahendra Singh Dhoni, limited his opportunities in that position. His approach to run-chasing — rotating the strike and building partnerships in the middle overs — has been compared by commentators to that of Michael Bevan.

== Indian Premier League ==
Kaif represented the Rajasthan Royals in the inaugural 2008 Indian Premier League season, having been purchased for US$685,000. He appeared in all of the team's matches during their championship-winning campaign but scored176 runs at an average of 16. On 15 April 2009, he was released by Rajasthan Royals ahead of 2009 season.

He was purchased by Kings XI Punjab for US$250,000 for 2010 Indian Premier League, and subsequently played for Royal Challengers Bangalore in the 2011 and 2012 seasons.

== Coaching career ==
In February 2017, Gujarat Lions appointed Kaif as assistant coach under head coach Brad Hodge for the 2017 Indian Premier League. He subsequently served as assistant coach for Delhi Capitals during the 2019 and 2020 IPL seasons.

== Legends League Cricket ==
Kaif was drafted by Manipal Tigers for the inaugural season of Legends League Cricket in 2022 and was retained for second season.

== Political career ==
Kaif joined Indian National Congress and contested 2014 Loksabha election from the Phulpur constituency in Uttar Pradesh. He lost to Keshav Prasad Maurya of the BJP. In a 2018 interview, Kaif stated he was not actively considering a return to electoral politics but "you will never say never".
