= Mohammad Saif (cricketer, born 1976) =

Indian cricketer (born 1976)

Personal information
- Born: 21 July 1976 (age 50); Allahabad, Uttar Pradesh, India
- Batting: Right-handed
- Bowling: Right-arm fast-medium
- Role: Batsman

Domestic team information
- Years: Team
- 1994–2015: Uttar Pradesh
- Source: ESPNcricinfo

Mohammad Saif (born 21 July 1976) is an Indian cricketer who played for Uttar Pradesh in domestic cricket. He is a Right-hand bat batsman who played Youth cricket for India Under-19 cricket team. He scored 4 runs on his Twenty20 debut against Railways cricket team in March 2015 when he returned to competitive cricket after 6 long years. He scored 56 from just 19 balls in Ranji Trophy quarter final.

His father is Mohammad Tarif and his younger brother is Mohammad Kaif.
