= Hyder Ali (Indian cricketer) =

Indian cricketer (1943–2022)

Personal information
- Born: 4 August 1943; Allahabad, United Provinces, British India
- Died: 5 November 2022 (aged 79); Allahabad, Uttar Pradesh, India
- Batting: Left-handed
- Bowling: Slow left-arm orthodox

Career statistics
Competition	First-class	List A
Matches	113	4
Runs scored	3,125	47
Batting average	22.64	15.66
100s/50s	3/10	0/0
Top score	121	24
Balls bowled	20,268	162
Wickets	366	3
Bowling average	19.71	35.00
5 wickets in innings	25	0
10 wickets in match	3	0
Best bowling	9/25	2/41
Catches/stumpings	66/–	0/–
- Source: ESPNcricinfo, 20 June 2020

Syed Hyder Ali (4 August 1943 – 5 November 2022) was an Indian first class cricketer who played for the Railways cricket team. In his 25-year career, he became one of the most prolific bowlers in the history of the Ranji Trophy.

After retiring, he became a selector for the Railways team.

== Personal life ==
He has two sons – Sher Ali and Raza Ali. The latter was a first class cricketer.
