= Kirti Patel =

Indian cricketer (born 1969)

Kirti Karshanbhai Patel
Personal information
- Born: 27 November 1969 (age 56); Indore, Madhya Pradesh
- Batting: Right-handed
- Role: Wicketkeeper

Domestic team information
- Years: Team
- 1987-1997: Madhya Pradesh
- Indore Colts
- Source: ESPNcricinfo, 25 March 2016

Kirti Karshanbhai Patel (born 27 November 1969 in Indore, Madhya Pradesh) is an Indian cricketer who plays for Madhya Pradesh. He made his first-class debut in 1987 and played until 1998 in 61 first-class and 22 List A matches as wicket-keeper-batsman.
