= R. P. Singh (cricketer, born 1965) =

Indian cricketer (born 1965)

R P Singh
Personal information
- Full name: Rudra Pratap Singh
- Born: 6 January 1965 (age 61); Lucknow, Uttar Pradesh, India
- Role: Left-arm medium Right-hand batsman Cricket coach Match referee

Umpiring information
- WODIs umpired: 3 (1995–2004)
- Source: Cricinfo, 4 August 2022

Rudra Pratap Singh (born 6 January 1965) is an Indian former cricketer who played 59 first-class matches between 1982 and 1996 for Uttar Pradesh and English county sides. A left-arm medium pace bowler and right-handed batsman, Singh represented India in two one-day international matches, both against Australia in 1986, picking up the wicket of Dean Jones, his only international scalp.

In late 1990s, Singh moved to England and took up coaching assignments with Lancashire and the ECB.

Singh is the father of Lancashire player Harry Singh, an opening batsman who played for the England under-19 team in 2022.
