= Ashish Zaidi =

Indian cricketer (born 1971)

Personal information
- Full name: Ashish Winston Zaidi
- Born: 16 September 1971 (age 55); Allahabad, Uttar Pradesh, India
- Role: Right-hand batsman; Right-arm fast-medium; Cricket coach
- Source: ESPNcricinfo, 17 December 2020

Ashish Winston Zaidi, popularly known as Zaidi is an Indian cricketer, who has represented Uttar Pradesh in 157 first-class matches, as a Fast bowler between 1988 and 2006. He was almost selected to play for India in his heyday. Due to his Hindu first name, Christian middle name and Muslim surname, he was often called "Amar Akbar Anthony" by his teammates.

Ashish, an alumnus of the Guru Gobind Singh Sports College, Lucknow, announced his retirement from first class cricket on 17 December 2006 after claiming 427 wickets in 157 first-class matches in an 18-year career for his state.
