= Gyanendra Pandey (cricketer) =

Indian cricketer (born 1972)

Personal information
- Full name: Gyanendrakumar Kedarnath Pandey
- Born: 12 August 1972 (age 54); Lucknow, Uttar Pradesh, India
- Batting: Left-handed
- Bowling: Slow left-arm orthodox

International information
- National side: India (1999)
- ODI debut (cap 120): 24 March 1999 v Pakistan
- Last ODI: 1 April 1999 v Pakistan

Domestic team information
- Years: Team
- 1988/89–2006: Uttar Pradesh

Career statistics
Competition	ODI	FC	LA
Matches	2	117	82
Runs scored	4	5,348	1,781
Batting average	4.00	36.38	37.10
100s/50s	0/0	9/30	0/12
Top score	4*	178	93*
Balls bowled	78	15,199	4,064
Wickets	0	165	89
Bowling average	–	35.89	33.78
5 wickets in innings	–	5	1
10 wickets in match	–	0	0
Best bowling	–	7/167	5/44
Catches/stumpings	0/–	57/–	29/–
- Source: ESPNcricinfo, 21 April 2007

Gyanendrakumar Kedarnath Pandey (born 12 August 1972) is a former Indian cricketer. He is a left-handed batsman and a slow left-arm bowler.

Pandey made his debut in the Pepsi Cup in 1998–99, but he had a much longer association with the game, having played from 1989. He had been playing steadily for Uttar Pradesh's Ranji Trophy team, but only began to make his mark around 1996–97 where two consecutive seasons having scored more than 400 runs brought him into national reckoning.

Pandey retired from first-class cricket in 2006. He was awarded Maati Ratan Samman by Shaheed Shodha Sansthan for his contribution in cricket in 2016.
