= Uttar Pradesh cricket team =

Indian cricket team

Uttar Pradesh Cricket Team उत्तर प्रदेश क्रिकेट टीम
- Ekana Cricket Stadium

Personnel
- Captain: Aryan Juyal (FC); Rinku Singh (LA); Karan Sharma (T20)
- Coach: Vijay Dahiya
- Owner: Uttar Pradesh Cricket Association

Team information
- Colours: Blue White
- Founded: 1903
- Home ground: Green Park Stadium, Kanpur
- Capacity: 32,000
- Secondary home ground(s): Ekana Cricket Stadium, Lucknow, Varanasi Cricket Stadium, Varanasi, Saifai International Cricket Stadium, Saifai
- Secondary ground capacity: 50,000, 30,000, 43,000

History
- First-class debut: Delhi in 1934 at Sadar Bazar Stadium, Agra
- Ranji Trophy wins: 1
- Vijay Hazare Trophy wins: 1
- Syed Mushtaq Ali Trophy wins: 1
- Irani Cup wins: 0
- Nissar Trophy wins: 1
- Official website: UPCA

The Uttar Pradesh cricket team, formerly United Provinces Cricket Team, is a domestic cricket team which is based in the Indian state of Uttar Pradesh, run by the Uttar Pradesh Cricket Association. The team competes in the first-class cricket tournament Ranji Trophy and limited-overs Vijay Hazare Trophy and Syed Mushtaq Ali Trophy. They have won the Ranji Trophy in 2005–06 and have been runners-up on five occasions. Cricketers such as Suresh Raina, Mohammad Kaif, Piyush Chawla, Rudra Pratap Singh, Praveen Kumar, Bhuvneshwar Kumar and Kuldeep Yadav have passed through Uttar Pradesh and gone on to represent India.

== Competition history ==
The team was formed in 1934 under the name of "United Provinces". The team's best performance in the Ranji Trophy in their early years came in 1939–40 when they finished as runners-up. In the 1950–51 season, the team's name was changed to "Uttar Pradesh".A stellar role was played for standard upgrade by the team captain Ashwani Chaturvedi during 1958 to 1965 .

Uttar Pradesh have not been strong in the Ranji Trophy cricket for any prolonged period in their history. Their only victory in the Ranji Trophy Elite Group was in the 2005–06 season. The Ranji Trophy win was one of the most spectacular comebacks in cricketing history, since at one point of time in the season Uttar Pradesh were on the brink of relegation.

They have finished runner-up twice before, once in 1997–98 against a strong Karnataka side, and once in 1977–78 against the same team under the captaincy of Mohammad Shahid and team manager was Karim Chishti, former captain Uttar Pradesh. They finished runners-up in the 2007–08 season, reprising a performance, similar to the one witnessed in the 2005–06 season, when they came back from the brink of relegation to win the championship. This time though, they lost to Delhi in the final.

This season's stellar performers were Mohammad Kaif, their captain who finished as the season's 3rd highest run-getter, medium pacer Sudeep Tyagi, season's 2nd highest wicket taker and Praveen Kumar who took 8 wickets in the Ranji Trophy final.

Their best performance in the Vijay Hazare Trophy came in 2004–05 when they were joint-winners with Tamil Nadu. In 2006 they won the Nissar Trophy, defeating Sialkot cricket team in Dharmasala. Their only appearance in the Irani Trophy came in the 2006–07 season in which they lost to the Rest of India team.

== Honours ==
United Provinces

- Ranji Trophy
  - Runners-up (1): 1939–40

Uttar Pradesh

- Ranji Trophy
  - Winners: 2005–06
  - Runners-up (4): 1977–78, 1997–98, 2007–08, 2008–09
- Nissar Trophy
  - Winners: 2006–07
- Vijay Hazare Trophy
  - Winners: 2002–03
  - Runners-up (2): 2005-06, 2020-21
- Syed Mushtaq Ali Trophy
  - Winners: 2015-16
  - Runners-up: 2013-14

== Notable players ==
Players from Uttar Pradesh who have played Test cricket for India, along with year of Test debut:

- Gopal Sharma (1985)
- Mohammad Kaif (2000)
- Nikhil Chopra (2000)
- Rudra Pratap Singh (2006)
- Piyush Chawla (2006)
- Suresh Raina (2010)
- Praveen Kumar (2011)
- Bhuvneshwar Kumar (2013)
- Kuldeep Yadav (2017)
- Dhruv Jurel (2024)

Players from Uttar Pradesh who have played ODI but not Test cricket for India, along with year of ODI debut :

- Rudra Pratap Singh (1986)
- Gyanendra Pandey (1999)
- Sudeep Tyagi (2009)
- Rinku Singh (2023)

Players from Uttar Pradesh who have played T20I but not Test or ODI cricket for India, along with year of T20I debut :

- Shivam Mavi (2023)

== Current squad ==
Players with international caps are listed in bold.

Name	Birth date	Batting style	Bowling style	Notes
Batters
Abhishek Goswami	6 November 1997 (age 29)	Right-handed	Right-arm off break	
Priyam Garg	30 November 2000 (age 25)	Right-handed	Right-arm medium	
**Rinku Singh**	12 October 1997 (age 29)	Left-handed	Right-arm off break	**List A Captain**; Plays for **Kolkata Knight Riders** in IPL
Madhav Kaushik	3 January 1998 (age 28)	Right-handed	Right-arm off break	
Sameer Rizvi	6 December 2003 (age 22)	Right-handed	Right-arm off break	Plays for **Delhi Capitals** in IPL
Aaradhya Yadav	3 June 2004 (age 22)	Right-handed		
Siddarth Yadav	13 August 2003 (age 23)	Left-handed	Right-arm off break	
Divyansh Joshi	24 September 2001 (age 25)	Right-handed	Right-arm medium	
All-rounder
Karan Sharma	31 October 1998 (age 28)	Right-handed	Right-arm off break	**Twenty20 Captain**
Wicket-keepers
Aryan Juyal	11 November 2001 (age 25)	Right-handed		**First-class Captain**
**Dhruv Jurel**	21 January 2001 (age 25)	Right-handed		Plays for **Rajasthan Royals** in IPL
Spin bowlers
Prashant Veer	24 November 2005 (age 20)	Right-handed	Slow left-arm orthodox	
Vipraj Nigam	28 July 2004 (age 22)	Right-handed	Right-arm leg break	Plays for **Delhi Capitals** in IPL
Shivam Sharma	14 November 1995 (age 31)	Right-handed	Slow left-arm orthodox	
Zeeshan Ansari	16 December 1999 (age 26)	Right-handed	Right-arm leg break	Plays for **Delhi Capitals** in IPL
Kartik Yadav	1 November 2006 (age 20)	Left-handed	Slow left-arm orthodox	
**Kuldeep Yadav**	14 December 1994 (age 31)	Left-handed	Slow left-arm unorthodox	Plays for **Lucknow Super Giants** in IPL
Yash Garg	31 October 2000 (age 26)	Left-handed	Slow left-arm orthodox	
Pace bowlers
**Shivam Mavi**	26 November 1998 (age 27)	Right-handed	Right-arm medium	
Kunal Tyagi	15 August 2003 (age 23)	Right-handed	Right-arm medium	
Kartik Tyagi	8 November 2000 (age 26)	Right-handed	Right-arm fast	Plays for **Kolkata Knight Riders** in IPL
**Bhuvneshwar Kumar**	5 February 1990 (age 36)	Right-handed	Right-arm medium	Plays for **Royal Challengers Bengaluru** in IPL
Vaibhav Chaudhary	17 October 2000 (age 26)	Right-handed	Right-arm medium	
Yash Dayal	13 December 1997 (age 28)	Left-handed	Left-arm medium	Plays for **Royal Challengers Bengaluru** in IPL
Mohsin Khan	15 July 1998 (age 28)	Left-handed	Left-arm medium	Plays for **Lucknow Super Giants** in IPL

Updated as on 17 November 2026

== Coaching staff ==
- Head coach: Vijay Dahiya
- Assistant coach: Vikramjeet Malik
- Trainer: Rashid Zirak
- Physio: Russell Pinto
- Manager:Dipannakar Malviya
- Video analyst : Subbarao
- Fielding Coach : Musi Raza

== See also ==
- Uttar Pradesh Cricket Association
- Green Park Stadium
- Ekana International Cricket Stadium
- Saifai International Cricket Stadium
