= List of cricket grounds in Madhya Pradesh =

The following table lists the cricket grounds in Madhya Pradesh that have hosted First-Class Matches and List A Cricket Matches as well as Twenty20 cricket. Also, included in the list are the cricket grounds that have hosted International matches in Madhya Pradesh.

== International venues ==
Name	City	State	First used	Last used	F/C	LA	T20	Notes
Holkar Stadium	Indore	Madhya Pradesh	1997	2026	50	52	52	Hosted 3 Tests, 8 ODIs and 4 T20Is.
Roop Singh Stadium	Gwalior	Madhya Pradesh	1979	2022	24	18	0	Hosted 12 ODIs.
Nehru Stadium	Indore	Madhya Pradesh	1965	2001	41	17	0	Hosted 9 ODIs.
Shrimant Madhavrao Scindia Cricket Stadium	Gwalior	Madhya Pradesh	2024	2024	0	0	1	Hosted 1 T20I.

== Domestic venues ==
Name	City	State	First used	Last used	F/C	LA	T20	Notes
Bharat Heavy Electrical Ltd Sports Complex	Bhopal	Madhya Pradesh	1987	1994	4	1	0	
Tatya Tope Nagar Stadium	Bhopal	Madhya Pradesh	1982	1982	1	0	0	
Colliery Stadium	Birsinghpur	Madhya Pradesh	1968	1987	4	0	0	
Laxmibhai College of Physical Education Ground	Gwalior	Madhya Pradesh	1943	1995	2	1	0	
Central Gymkhana Ground	Indore	Madhya Pradesh	1961	1965	3	0	0	
Daly College Ground	Indore	Madhya Pradesh	1955	2005	5	10	0	
Emerald High School Ground	Indore	Madhya Pradesh	2007	2024	5	23	24	
Industrial Training Institute Ground	Indore	Madhya Pradesh	1989	1989	1	0	0	
New Digamber Public School Ground	Indore	Madhya Pradesh	2009	2009	0	2	0	
Yeshwant Club Ground	Indore	Madhya Pradesh	1935	1960	46	0	0	
Garrison Ground	Jabalpur	Madhya Pradesh	1953	1981	4	0	0	
Pandit Ravishankar Shukla Stadium	Jabalpur	Madhya Pradesh	1976	1976	1	0	0	
National Thermal Power Corporation Ground	Jabalpur	Madhya Pradesh	1992	1992	1	0	0	
Nutan Stadium	Mandsaur	Madhya Pradesh	-	-	0	0	0	
Grasim Industries Ground	Nagda	Madhya Pradesh	1988	1988	1	0	0	
Railway Ground	Ratlam	Madhya Pradesh	1952	1952	1	0	0	
Awadhesh Pratap Singh University Stadium	Rewa	Madhya Pradesh	1983	1983	1	0	0	
University Teaching Department Ground	Sagar	Madhya Pradesh	1982	1982	1	0	0	
Bhopal Sugar Industries Ground	Sehore	Madhya Pradesh	1985	1985	1	0	0	
Indian Iron and Steel Company Stanton Pipe Factory Ground	Ujjain	Madhya Pradesh	1977	1980	2	0	0	

== Proposed venues ==
Stadium	Capacity	City	Tenant	Opening
Barkatullah University Stadium	50,000	Bhopal	Madhya Pradesh cricket team	n/a
Indore Sports Complex	50,000	Indore	Madhya Pradesh cricket team	n/a
Ujjain International Stadium	50,000	Ujjain	Madhya Pradesh cricket team	n/a
