= Bangladesh–India cricket rivalry =

Sporting rivalry between India and Bangladesh

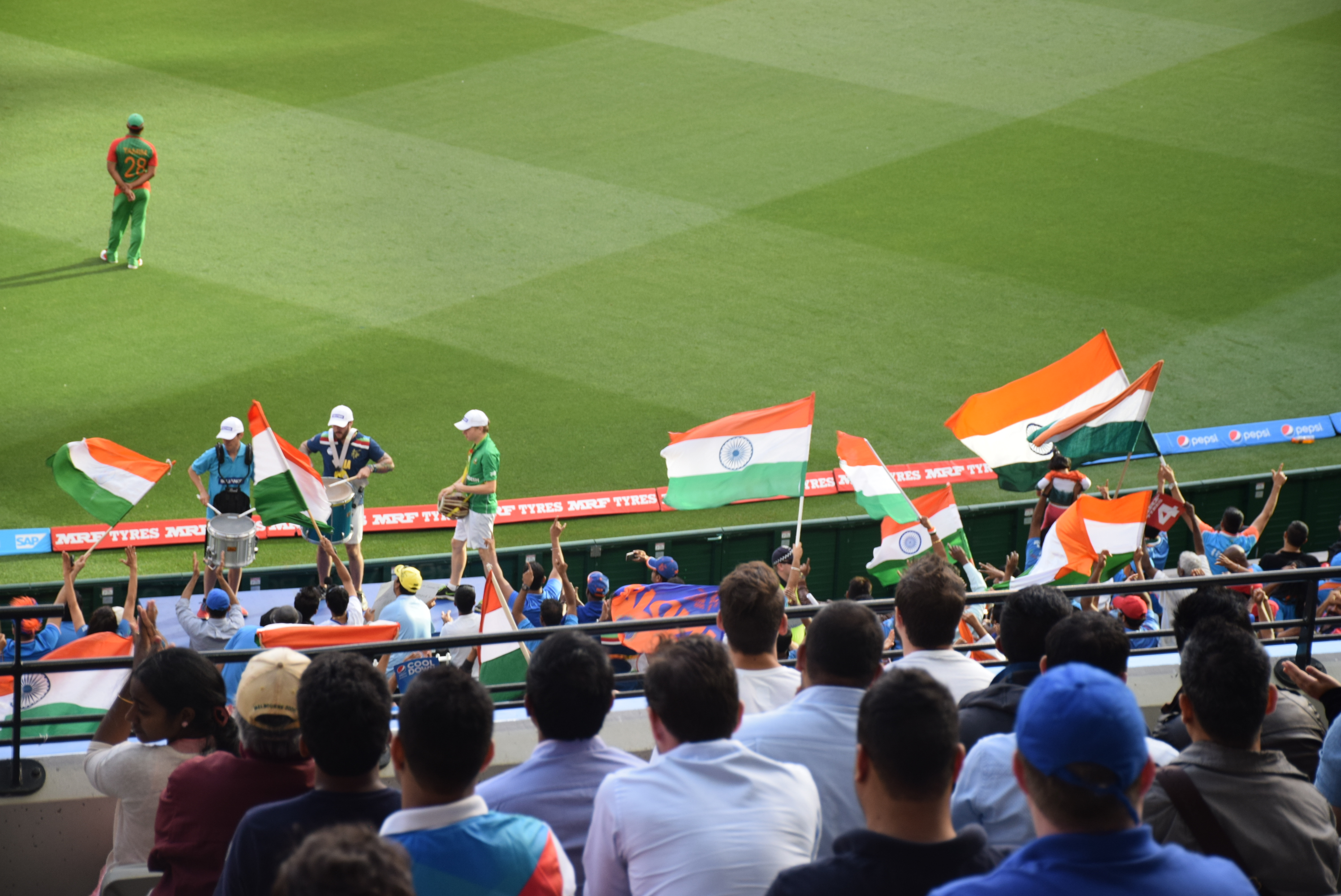
- 2015 Cricket World Cup match between India and Bangladesh
- Other names: Ganguly–Durjoy Trophy
- Sport: Cricket
- Teams: India; Bangladesh
- First meeting: Test: 10–14 November 2000 (India won by 9 wickets); ODI: 27 October 1988 (India won by 9 wickets); T20I: 6 June 2009 (India won by 25 runs)
- Latest meeting: Test: 27 September–1 October 2024 (India won by 7 wickets); ODI: 20 February 2025 (India won by 6 wickets); T20I: 28 September 2025 (India won by 41 runs)
- Next meeting: ODI: TBD Test: TBD T20I: TBD

Statistics
- Total meetings: Test: 15; ODI: 42; T20I: 18
- Most wins: Test: (India 13 : Bangladesh 0); ODI: (India 33 : Bangladesh 8); T20I: (India 17 : Bangladesh 1)

Bangladesh and India have a long-standing rivalry in cricket. India dominated the rivalry from 1988 until 2007, after which the rivalry became more competitive in limited-overs cricket, with Bangladesh winning bilateral ODI series and producing several closely contested matches in ICC tournaments.

The two teams have played a total of 75 times, with India winning 63 matches and Bangladesh winning 9. In Tests, ODIs, and T20Is, India has been victorious in more games than Bangladesh, while Bangladesh has won two bilateral series in ODIs. In ICC World Cups, the two teams have met head-to-head in 10 matches, with India winning 9 of them

Historically, the two countries have shared friendly relations. However, there were diplomatic tensions in late 2025, which triggered Bangladesh to pull out of the 2026 T20 World Cup in India

== Background ==
After the partition of India in 1947, initially Bangladesh was part of Pakistan, before it became an independent nation in 1971.

Bangladesh thus became a member of the ICC in 1977 and then a full member in 2000. India first toured Bangladesh in the 1988 Asia Cup. This was the first time the two teams faced each other. The match was played in Chattogram, where India defeated Bangladesh by 9 wickets. Bangladesh toured India for the first time in 1990, where they faced India in Chandigarh.

After gaining Test status in 2000, Bangladesh played its first Test match in its history against India at home. India also toured Bangladesh in 2005 and won the first match by just 11 runs, but Bangladesh finally defeated India for the first time in the second ODI in Dhaka.

== Tournament results ==
=== Overall ===
Tournament	Won	
Tournament	India	Bangladesh
Cricket World Cup	2	0
T20 World Cup	3	0
Champions Trophy	3	0
World Test Championship	0	0
Olympic Games	–	–
Asia Cup	9	0
Asian Games	2	0
U19 World Cup	6	1
U19 Asia Cup	8	2
ACC Emerging Teams Asia Cup	1	0
Total	34	3
Women's Cricket
Cricket World Cup	1	0
T20 World Cup	0	0
Champions Trophy	–	–
Olympic Games	–	–
Women's Asia Cup	7	1
Women's Asian Games	1	0
U19 Women's T20 World Cup	2	0
Under-19 Women's T20 Asia Cup	1	0
ACC Women's T20 Emerging Teams Asia Cup	2	0
Total	13	1

== Head to Head ==
- **Bold** indicates most wins

=== Overall ===
Format	Matches played	Result		
Format	Matches played	India	Bangladesh	Draw/No result
Test	15	**13**	0	2
ODI	42	**33**	8	1
T20I	18	**17**	1	0
Total	75	63	9	3

=== ICC tournaments ===
Tournament	Matches played			
Tournament	Matches played	India	Bangladesh	Draw/No result
Cricket World Cup	5	**4**	1	0
T20 World Cup	5	**5**	0	0
Champions Trophy	2	**2**	0	0
World Test Championship Final	0	0	0	0
Total	12	11	1	0

=== ACC / Asian tournaments ===
Tournament	Matches played			
Tournament	Matches played	India	Bangladesh	No result
Asia Cup	15	**13**	2	0
Asian Games	1	**1**	0	0
Total	16	14	2	0

== List of series ==
List of India–Bangladesh Test Series
S	Years	Host	M	India	Bangladesh	D	Result	Holder
1	2000	Bangladesh	1	1	0	0	India	
2	2004	Bangladesh	2	2	0	0	India	
3	2007	Bangladesh	2	1	0	1	India	
4	2010	Bangladesh	2	2	0	0	India	
5	2015	Bangladesh	1	0	0	1	Drawn	India
Ganguly–Durjoy Trophy
6	2017	India	1	1	0	0	India	
7	2019	India	2	2	0	0	India	
8	2022	Bangladesh	2	2	0	0	India	
9	2024	India	2	2	0	0	India	
Total			15	13	0	2	India : 8 Bangladesh : 0	India : 9 Bangladesh : 0

List of India–Bangladesh ODI Series
S	Years	Host	M	India	Bangladesh	NR	Result
1	2004–05	Bangladesh	3	2	1	0	India
2	2007	Bangladesh	2	2	0	0	India
3	2014	Bangladesh	3	2	1	0	India
4	2015	Bangladesh	3	1	2	0	Bangladesh
5	2022	Bangladesh	3	1	2	0	Bangladesh
6	2026	Bangladesh	3	–	–	–	
Total			14	8	6	0	India : 3 Bangladesh : 2

List of India–Bangladesh T20I Series
S	Years	Host	M	India	Bangladesh	NR	Result
1	2019	India	3	2	1	0	India
2	2024	India	3	3	0	0	India
3	2026	Bangladesh	3	–	–	–	
Total			6	5	1	0	India : 2 Bangladesh : 0

== List of matches ==
List of India–Bangladesh Test Matches
S	Years	Host	Winner	Ground
1	2000	Bangladesh	India won by 9 wickets	Dhaka
2	2004	Bangladesh	India won by inns & 140 runs	Dhaka
3	2004	Bangladesh	India won by inns & 83 runs	Chattogram
4	2007	Bangladesh	Match Drawn	Chattogram
5	2007	Bangladesh	India won by inns & 239 runs	Mirpur
6	2010	Bangladesh	India won by 113 runs	Chattogram
7	2010	Bangladesh	India won by 10 wickets	Mirpur
8	2015	Bangladesh	Match Drawn	Fatullah
Ganguly–Durjoy Trophy
9	2017	India	India won by 208 runs	Hyderabad
10	2019	India	India won by inns & 113 runs	Indore
11	2019	India	India won by inns & 46 runs	Kolkata
12	2022	Bangladesh	India won by 188 runs	Chattogram
13	2022	Bangladesh	India won by 3 wickets	Mirpur
14	2024	India	India won by 280 runs	Chennai
15	2024	India	India won by 7 wickets	Kanpur

List of India–Bangladesh ODI Matches
S	Years	Host	Winner	Ground
1	1988	Bangladesh	India won by 9 wickets	Chattogram
2	1990	India	India won by 9 wickets	Chandigarh
3	1995	UAE	India won by 9 wickets	Sharjah
4	1997	Bangladesh	India won by 9 wickets	Colombo(SSC)
5	1998	Bangladesh	India won by 4 wickets	Dhaka
6	1998	India	India won by 5 wickets	Mohali
7	1998	India	India won by 5 wickets	Mumbai
8	2000	Bangladesh	India won by 8 wickets	Dhaka
9	2003	Bangladesh	India won by 200 runs	Dhaka
10	2003	Bangladesh	India won by 4 wickets	Dhaka
11	2004	Sri Lanka	India won by 8 wickets	Colombo(SSC)
12	2004	Bangladesh	India won by 11 runs	Chattogram
13	2004	Bangladesh	Bangladesh won by 15 runs	Dhaka
14	2004	Bangladesh	India won by 91 runs	Dhaka
15	2007	West Indies	Bangladesh won by 5 wickets	Port of Spain
17	2007	Bangladesh	India won by 5 wickets	Mirpur
18	2008	Bangladesh	India won by 46 runs	Mirpur
19	2008	Pakistan	India won by 7 wickets	Karachi
20	2010	Bangladesh	India won by 6 wickets	Mirpur
21	2010	Bangladesh	India won by 6 wickets	Mirpur
22	2010	Sri Lanka	India won by 6 wickets	Dambulla
23	2011	Bangladesh	India won by 87 runs	Mirpur
24	2012	Bangladesh	Bangladesh won by 5 wickets	Mirpur
25	2014	Bangladesh	India won by 6 wickets	Fatullah
26	2014	Bangladesh	India won by 7 wickets	Mirpur
27	2014	Bangladesh	India won by 47 runs	Mirpur
28	2014	Bangladesh	No Result	Mirpur
29	2015	Australia	India won by 109 runs	Melbourne
30	2015	Bangladesh	Bangladesh won by 79 runs	Mirpur
31	2015	Bangladesh	Bangladesh won by 6 wickets	Mirpur
32	2015	Bangladesh	India won by 77 runs	Mirpur
33	2017	England	India won by 9 wickets	Birmingham
34	2018	UAE	India won by 7 wickets	Dubai
35	2018	UAE	India won by 3 wickets	Dubai
36	2019	England	India won by 28 runs	Birmingham
37	2022	Bangladesh	Bangladesh won by 1 wickets	Mirpur
38	2022	Bangladesh	Bangladesh won by 5 runs	Mirpur
39	2022	Bangladesh	India won by 227 runs	Chattogram
40	2023	Sri Lanka	Bangladesh won by 6 runs	Colombo(RPS)
41	2023	India	India won by 7 wickets	Pune
42	2025	UAE	India won by 6 wickets	Dubai

List of India–Bangladesh T20I Matches
S	Years	Host	Winner	Grounds
1	2009	England	India won by 25 runs	Nottingham
2	2014	Bangladesh	India won by 8 wickets	Mirpur
3	2016	Bangladesh	India won by 45 runs	Mirpur
4	2016	Bangladesh	India won by 6 wickets	Mirpur
5	2016	India	India won by 1 runs	Bengaluru
6	2018	Sri Lanka	India won by 6 wickets	Colombo(RPS)
7	2018	Sri Lanka	India won by 17 runs	Colombo(RPS)
8	2018	Sri Lanka	India won by 4 wickets	Colombo(RPS)
9	2019	India	Bangladesh won by 7 wickets	Delhi
10	2019	India	India won by 8 wickets	Rajkot
11	2019	India	India won by 30 runs	Nagpur
12	2022	Australia	India won by 5 runs	Adelaide
13	2023	China	India won by 9 wickets	Hangzhou
14	2024	West Indies	India won by 50 runs	North Sound
15	2024	India	India won by 7 wickets	Gwalior
16	2024	India	India won by 86 runs	Delhi
17	2024	India	India won by 133 runs	Hyderabad
18	2025	UAE	India won by 41 runs	Dubai

== See also ==
- India–Pakistan cricket rivalry
- Bangladesh–Sri Lanka cricket rivalry
