= List of Madhya Pradesh first-class cricket records =

This is a list of Madhya Pradesh first-class cricket records, with each list containing the top five performances in the category.

Currently active players are bolded.

== Team records ==
=== Highest innings totals ===
Rank	Score	Opponent	Season
1	619/8 dec	Saurashtra	2013/14
2	605	Haryana	1998/99
3	596/8 dec	Baroda	1997/98
4	585	Rajasthan	1998/99
5	577	Rajasthan	1996/97
Source: CricketArchive. Last updated: 19 October 2016.

=== Lowest innings totals ===
Rank	Score	Opponent	Season
1	60	Baroda	2013/14
2	61	Rajasthan	1981/82
3	63	Baroda	2011/12
4	63	Uttar Pradesh	2014/15
5	68	Haryana	2002/03
Source: CricketArchive. Last updated: 19 October 2016.

=== Largest margin of runs victory ===
Rank	Margin	Opponent	Season
1	355 runs	Bengal	2015/16
2	287 runs	Maharashtra	1994/95
3	202 runs	Vidarbha	1982/83
4	189 runs	Vidarbha	1971/72
5	170 runs	Jharkhand	2007/08
Source: CricketArchive. Last updated: 19 October 2016.

=== Largest margin of runs victory ===
Rank	Margin	Opponent	Season
1	inns & 239 runs	Jharkhand	2011/12
2	inns & 176 runs	Vidarbha	2000/01
3	inns & 163 runs	Vidarbha	1976/77
4	inns & 156 runs	Tripura	2010/11
Source: CricketArchive. Last updated: 19 October 2016.

== Batting records ==
=== Highest individual scores ===
Rank	Score	Player	Opponent	Season
1	265	Jai Prakash Yadav	Railways	1999/00
2	251	Syed Abbas Ali	Railways	1997/98
3	239*	Satyam Choudhary	Railways	2013/14
4	238	Amay Khurasiya	Vidarbha	1992/93
5	237	Amay Khurasiya	Maharashtra	2002/03
Source: CricketArchive. Last updated: 19 October 2016.

=== Most runs in a season ===
Rank	Runs	Player	Season
1	955	Devendra Bundela	1998/99
2	835	**Naman Ojha**	2013/14
3	788	Jai Prakash Yadav	1996/97
4	769	**Jalaj Saxena**	2012/13
5	761	Syed Abbas Ali	1996/97
Source: CricketArchive. Last updated: 19 October 2016.

== Bowling records ==
=== Best innings bowling ===
Rank	Score	Player	Opponent	Season
1	8/52	Narendra Hirwani	Vidarbha	1993/94
2	8/58	**Jalaj Saxena**	Railways	2015/16
3	8/66	Narendra Hirwani	Railways	1993/94
4	8/80	Jai Prakash Yadav	Vidarbha	2000/01
5	8/84	**Ishwar Pandey**	Railways	2013/14
Source: CricketArchive. Last updated: 19 October 2016.

=== Best match bowling ===
Rank	Score	Player	Opponent	Season
1	16/154	**Jalaj Saxena**	Vidarbha	2015/16
2	15/111	Jai Prakash Yadav	Hyderabad	2012/13
3	13/107	Narendra Hirwani	Tripura	1969/70
4	13/108	Ankit Sharma	Vidarbha	2002/03
5	13/115	Ashok Jagdale	Railways	2002/03
Source: CricketArchive. Last updated: 19 October 2016.

=== Hat-Trick ===
Player	Opponent	Season
Hiralal Gaekwad	Rajasthan	1962/63
Ravi yadav

== Notes ==
All lists are referenced to CricketArchive.

== See also ==
- Madhya Pradesh cricket team
- List of Madhya Pradesh List A cricket records
