= Madhya Pradesh Cricket Association =

Governing body of cricket activities in Madhya Pradesh state, India

- Madhya Pradesh Cricket Association
- Sport: Cricket
- Jurisdiction: Madhya Pradesh
- Abbreviation: MPCA
- Founded: 1956; 70 years ago
- Affiliation: Board of Control for Cricket in India
- Affiliation date: 1951
- Headquarters: Holkar Cricket Stadium
- Location: Indore
- President: Mahanaryaman Scindia
- CEO: Rohit Pandit
- Secretary: Sanjeev Rao

Official website
- mpcaonline.com
- Other key staff: Chandrakant Pandit (Chief coach of MPCA )
- (India)

The Madhya Pradesh Cricket Association (MPCA), headquartered in Indore, India, is the governing body of cricket in the Indian state of Madhya Pradesh and the Madhya Pradesh cricket team. The board was formed in 1940 as the Holkar Cricket Association.

It is one of the Cricket Governing provincial units affiliated with the Board of Control for Cricket in India.

MPCA has been an affiliate of the BCCI since the 1940s.

In the recent past, MPCA has contributed to the careers of Indian cricketers like Col. C.K. Nayudu, Capt. Mushtaq Ali, Narendra Hirwani, Rajesh Chauhan, Amay Khurasiya, Naman Ojha among others.

MPCA is a regular participant in all domestic tournaments conducted by the BCCI. MPCA is the only provincial unit in India that has two International venues under its control. Both venues have contemporary facilities for International cricket matches.

MPCA has hosted 22 One Day International games and 2 IPL matches. Before 2001, Nehru Stadium was the venue for hosting ODI as Indore. The first-ever Ranji Trophy final under floodlights was played at Capt. Roop Singh Stadium in April 1997. The India Vs West Indies ODI in December 2011 saw Virender Sehwag reach 219 runs.

MPCA was associated with two of the milestones in the cricketing career of Sachin Tendulkar. He scored his ten thousandth run during the ODI played at Indore against Australia in 2001 and became the first male cricketer to score a double century in ODI against South Africa at Gwalior in 2010. Virender Sehwag made 219 runs in an ODI in 2011 against the West Indies in Indore.

Before the Lodha Committee Reforms, the Association was led by Jyotiraditya M Scindia, Sanjay Jagdale and Milind Kanmadikar, who had to discontinue due to disqualification conditions as per Lodha Reforms.

== History ==
Madhya Pradesh Cricket Association is a body controlling and governing the game of cricket in the State of Madhya Pradesh. MPCA is an affiliated unit of the Board of Control for Cricket in India (BCCI).

A look at the transition of MPCA will take us back to the year 1932 when the Central India Cricket Association came into existence. Later on, the Holkar Cricket Association from 1940–41 to 1954–55, Madhya Bharat (1955 – 57) and subsequently the Madhya Pradesh Cricket Association from 1957 till date.

Before the Indian Independence, Indore, earlier known as Indore, was a princely state under the control of the Holkar Dynasty. Indore was the hub of cricket activities during that era.

HH Maharaja Yeshwantrao Holkar II of Indore State was a cricket fan and supported cricket and upcoming cricketers. To boost up the local cricket set-up, he invited prominent players like Col. C K Nayudu, Bhausaheb Nimbalkar, Chandu Sarawate, C S Nayudu, Khandu Rangnekar, Hiralal Gaekwad and Kamala Bhandarkar to play cricket for his team in addition to locals such as The Holkars, Capt. S Mushtaq Ali, Major M M Jagdale, and J N Bhaya. He also offered them job opportunities in his army.

Col. C K Nayudu was the captain of the Indian side for the first-ever test played in the year 1932 against England. The batting elegance of Syed Mushtaq Ali can be gauged from the fact that he was the first Indian to score a Test century on foreign soil, against England at Manchester in 1936.

These cricketers played a pivotal role in the development of the game in this part of the country. With support from local players like Syed Mushtaq Ali, Madhavsinh Jagdale, J N Bhaya, Rameshwar Pratap Singh and others, the Holkar team appeared to be invincible.

During the period of fifteen years from 1940–41 to 1954–55, the Holkar team won the coveted Ranji Trophy on four occasions – 1945/46, 1947/48, 1950/51 and 1952/53. Moreover, they were the runner-up on six occasions in 1944/45, 1946/47, 1949/50, 1951/52, 1953/54 and 1954/55.

Subsequently, the end of the Holkar era created a vacuum in Madhya Pradesh Cricket for a few years. Though good cricketers were emerging on a regular basis, the team could not perform consistently. Players like Bhagwandas Suthar, Subodh Saxena, Sanjay Jagdale, Narendra Menon, Ashok Jagdale, Vijay Nayudu, Syed Gulrez Ali, Manohar Sharma, Ashwini Chaturvedi gave a glimpse of their talent and were amongst the leading domestic players knocking for a berth in the Indian side.

With support from BCCI and the influx of young players, the MP team started performing as a cohesive unit and qualified regularly for the knock-out phase of the Ranji Tournament during the period from 1971 to 1980. However, the team could not replicate the winning performance of the Holkar team.

Efforts on part of MPCA helped in laying the development pathway for the next generation of cricketers. Regular tournaments, upgradation of infrastructure, talent identification processes, the appointment of seasoned coaches, services from professional players and other measures were adopted in tandem to reach the desired goals.

Players like Narendra Hirwani, Rajesh Chauhan, J P Yadav, Amay Khurasiya, and Naman Ojha to name a few, gained the benefits of these efforts on part of MPCA and marked a place in Indian cricket with their performances.

Late HH Maharaja Madhavrao Scindia of Gwalior, President – BCCI, A W Kanmadikar, Secretary – BCCI, Late Madhavsinh Jagdale, Sanjay Jagdale, Narendra Hirwani (All National Selectors), Narendra Menon, Sudhir Asnani (International Umpires) Dr. Uma Sengar (chairperson, GDA) have emerged from this system. Sanjay Jagdale was secretary of the BCCI from MPCA.

== Divisional Association Members ==
- Gwalior Division Cricket Association
- Ujjain Divisional Cricket Association
- Indore Division Cricket Association
- Bhopal Division Cricket Association
- Sagar Division Cricket Association
- Rewa Division Cricket Association
- Jabalpur Division Cricket Association
- Narmandapuram Division Cricket Association
- Chambal Divisional Cricket Association
- Shahdol Divisional Cricket Association

== Home ground ==
- Nehru Stadium, Indore⁣-hosted 9 ODIs
- Captain Roop Singh Stadium, Gwalior⁣ – Hosted 12 ODIs. This is the ground where the first double century was scored by Sachin Tendulkar
- Holkar Cricket Stadium, Indore⁣ – hosted 3 ODIs. Virendra Sehwag scored double-centuries in ODIs. Hosted IPL matches.
- Madhya Pradesh Cricket Association Ground, Bamhori Renguwan, Sagar
- MPCA Cricket Ground, Neemkhera, Jabalpur
- Gwalior Cricket Stadium⁣ – Proposed
- Ujjain International Stadium⁣ – Proposed

== International umpire ==
- Narendra Menon
- Sudhir Asnani
- Nitin Menon

== Divisional Activities ==
Throughout the ten divisions which come under MPCA, it conducts cricketing activities in all ten divisions on a regular basis. Apart from having International Grounds at Indore and Gwalior, MPCA has its own Cricket facilities at Sagar, Rewa, Hoshangabad, Morena and Jabalpur.

== See also ==
- Holkar State
