= Jagdale =

Jagdale is an Indian(Marathi) surname. Notable people with the surname include:

- Madhavsinh Jagdale (1914–1990), Indian cricketer
- Ashok Jagdale (born 1945), Indian cricketer, son of Madhavsinh
- Sanjay Jagdale (born 1950), Indian cricketer, son of Madhavsinh
