= Ujjain Divisional Cricket Association =

Ujjain Divisional Cricket Association is the governing body of the cricket activities in the Ujjain Division of Madhya Pradesh in India and the Ujjain Divisional cricket team. It is affiliated to the Madhya Pradesh Cricket Association, which is a member of the Board of Control for Cricket in India. UDCA is a regular participant in all domestic tournaments conducted by the MPCA. In the recent past, UDCA has contributed in shaping up the careers of renowned Indian cricketers like Naman Ojha and Devendra Bundela.

== Home ground ==
- Government Boys Higher Secondary School No 2
- Indian Iron and Steel Company Stanton Pipe Factory Ground – Hosted few Ranji Trophy matches
- Mahakal Institute of Technology Ground
- Ujjain International Cricket Stadium – Proposed
