= List of Madhya Pradesh List A cricket records =

This is a list of Madhya Pradesh List A cricket records, with each list containing the top five performances in the category.

Currently active players are bolded.

== Team records ==
=== Highest innings totals ===
Rank	Score	Opponent	Season
1	412/6	Railways	2009/10
2	338/2	Rajasthan	2000/01
3	333	Saurashtra	2015/16
4	311/8	Vidarbha	1993/94
5	305/6	Rajasthan	1993/94
Source: CricketArchive. Last updated: 19 October 2016.

=== Lowest innings totals ===
Rank	Score	Opponent	Season
1	48	Railways	2011/12
Source: CricketArchive. Last updated: 19 October 2016.

=== Largest Margin of Runs Victory ===
Rank	Margin	Opponent	Season
1	184 runs	Railways	2009/10
2	140 runs	Rajasthan	2007/08
3	121 runs	Vidarbha	1994/95
4	119 runs	Uttar Pradesh	2000/01
5	105 runs	Railways	2010/11
Source: CricketArchive. Last updated: 19 October 2016.

== Batting records ==
=== Highest individual scores ===
Rank	Score	Player	Opponent	Season
1	167	**Naman Ojha**	Railways	2009/10
2	157	Amay Khurasiya	Rajasthan	2005/06
3	140	Mudassar Pasha	Uttar Pradesh	2001/02
4	134	Amay Khurasiya	Vidarbha	1993/94
5	133	**Jalaj Saxena**	Saurashtra	2015/16
Source: CricketArchive. Last updated: 19 October 2016.

== Bowling records ==
=== Best innings bowling ===
Rank	Score	Player	Opponent	Season
1	6/34	Harvinder Sodhi	Wills' XI	1998/99
2	5/26	Manish Majithia	Rajasthan	2002/03
3	5/27	Manish Majithia	Uttar Pradesh	1995/96
4	5/40	**Jalaj Saxena**	Vidarbha	2012/13
5	5/41	Manish Majithia	Railways	1999/00
Source: CricketArchive. Last updated: 19 October 2016.

=== Hat-Tricks ===
Rank	Score	Player	Opponent	Season
1	6/34	Jai Prakash Yadav	Bengal	1998/99
Source: CricketArchive. Last updated: 19 October 2016.

== Notes ==
All lists are referenced to CricketArchive.

== See also ==
- Madhya Pradesh cricket team
- List of Madhya Pradesh first-class cricket records
