= Sports in Madhya Pradesh =

Madhya Pradesh is a state in India that is very valuable in the field of sports and personality development of youth through various sporting games.

== Cricket ==
National and International matches are hosted in Madhya Pradesh. In 2010 ODI cricket was hosted in Captain Roop Singh Stadium. Madhya Pradesh Cricket Association of Indore is responsible for the development and organizing games.

== Football ==
Madhya Pradesh is a home ground of hosting National Football games. In 2013 National Football League was hosted in Indore, Madhya Pradesh.

== Stadium ==
- Nehru Stadium is located in Indore, Madhya Pradesh. India have capacity of 25,000 and host about all types of sports including One Day International cricket matches.
