= Awadhesh =

Awadhesh is a given name. Notable people with the name include:

- Awadhesh Kumar Bharti, Indian Deputy Chief of the Air Staff
- Awadhesh Prasad Kushwaha, Indian politician
- Awadhesh Pratap Mall, Indian ruler of Majhauli Raj, Deoria district, British India
- Awadhesh Mishra (born 1969), Indian actor
- Awadhesh Prasad (born 1945), Indian politician
- Awadhesh Kumar Rai (born 1952), Indian politician
- Awadhesh Kumar Singh, Indian politician
- Awadhesh Narain Singh, Indian politician, leader of Bharatiya Janata Party
- Awadhesh Pratap Singh (1888–1967), Indian politician and Indian independence activist
- Awadhesh Singh, Indian politician
- Raja Awadhesh Singh (died 1933), Raja of Kalakankar estate of Oudh of British India
- Ram Awadhesh Singh (1937–2020), Indian politician, Social Justice Leader of India

== See also ==
- Awadhesh Kumar Singh College, state university in Medininagar, Jharkhand, India
- Awadhesh Pratap Singh University Stadium, multi purpose stadium in Rewa, Madhya Pradesh
