= List of international cricket centuries by Gary Kirsten =

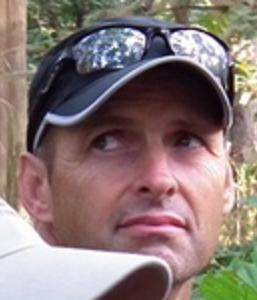
Kirsten pictured in 2010

Gary Kirsten is a former international cricketer who represented South Africa between 1993 and 2004. A left-handed batsman who primarily played as an opener, Kirsten took part in 101 Test matches and 185 One Day Internationals (ODIs) for his country and scored centuries (100 or more runs in a single innings) on 21 and 13 occasions respectively.

Kirsten made both his Test and ODI debuts against Australia in December 1993. He made his first Test century in November 1995, when he scored 110 against England. A year later Kirsten made centuries in both innings of a Test when he scored 102 and 133 in the second Test of the 1996–97 series against India. He achieved his highest Test score in 1999, when he made 275 against England in Durban. In an attempt to prevent South Africa from losing the match, he batted for almost 14 hours, spread across the last three of the match's five days. The innings remains the second-longest by any batsman in Test cricket in terms of time span, behind an innings of over 16 hours recorded by Hanif Mohammad for Pakistan in 1958. His most prolific series was against England in 2003, when he made 462 runs at an average of 66.00 including two centuries. His accomplishments with the bat during the season led to him being named as one of the five Wisden Cricketers of the Year the following year. As of June 2015, Kirsten is joint fourth in the list of leading Test century-makers for South Africa with AB de Villiers, and his total of three double centuries for the team is exceeded only by the four recorded by Graeme Smith. He scored centuries against all nine other teams which held Test match status at the time, and was the first player to score a hundred against every other active Test-playing nation.

Kirsten's first ODI century came against Australia in January 1994 in the first match of the best-of-three final of the Tri-nation tournament. His highest score in ODI cricket came against the United Arab Emirates during the 1996 Cricket World Cup when he scored 188 not out. As of November 2016, this is the highest one-day figure recorded by a South African and the third-highest in the World Cup by any batsman. (Note: At the time it was the second-highest score ever recorded by any batsman in ODI cricket, just one run behind the then-record of 189 set by Viv Richards in 1984.) In ODIs he was most successful against India, accumulating four centuries. South Africa lost only one of the thirteen matches in which Kirsten scored a century. As of November 2016, he is thirtieth among all-time century makers, and sixth in the equivalent list for South Africa.

== Key ==
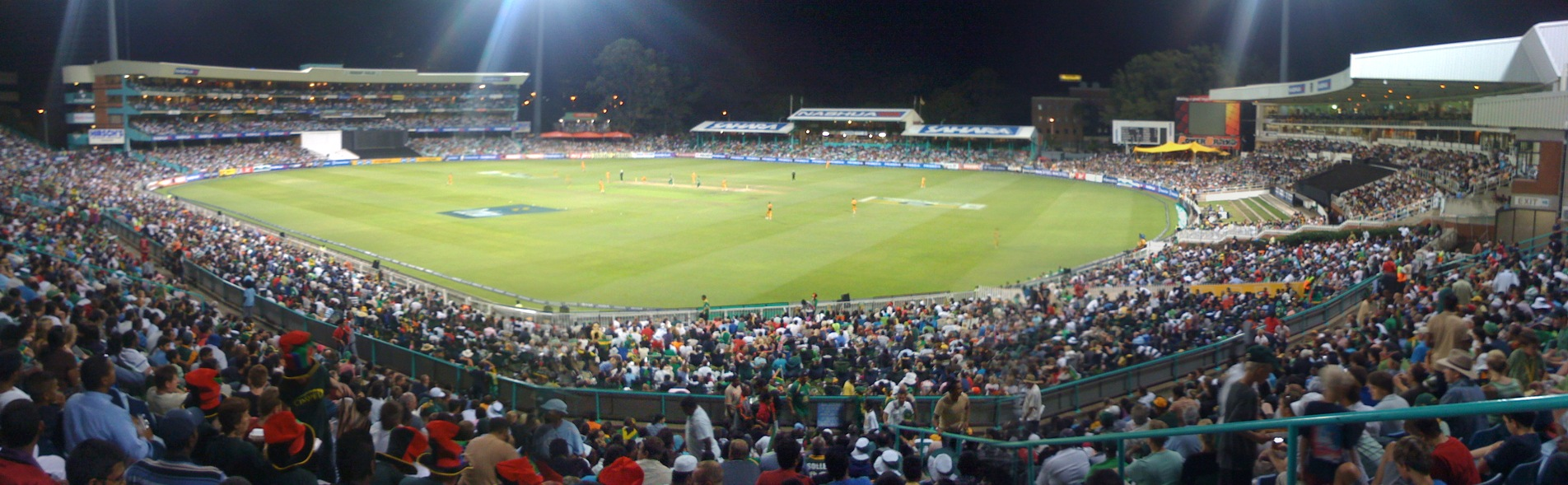
Kirsten made centuries in both innings of a match at the Kingsmead Cricket Ground, Durban in 1999.

Key
Symbol	Meaning
*	Remained not out
‡	Man of the match
Pos.	Position in the batting order
Balls	Balls faced
Inn.	The innings of the match
Test	The number of the Test match played in that series
S/R.	Strike rate during the innings
H/A/N	Venue was at home (South Africa), away or neutral.
Date	Match starting day
Lost	The match was lost by South Africa.
Won	The match was won by South Africa.
Drawn	The match was drawn.

== Test cricket centuries ==
List of Test centuries scored by Gary Kirsten
No.	Score	Against	Pos.	Inn.	Test	Venue	H/A/N	Date	Result
1	110	England	2	1	2/5	The Wanderers Stadium, Johannesburg	Home	30 November 1995	Drawn
2 ‡	102	India	2	1	2/3	Eden Gardens, Kolkata	Away	27 November 1996	Won
3 ‡	133	India	2	3	2/3	Eden Gardens, Kolkata	Away	27 November 1996	Won
4	103	India	2	1	2/3	Newlands Cricket Ground, Cape Town	Home	2 January 1997	Won
5	100*	Pakistan	1	1	3/3	Iqbal Stadium, Faisalabad	Away	24 October 1997	Won
6	108*	Australia	1	3	3/3	Adelaide Oval, Adelaide	Away	30 January 1998	Drawn
7	210	England	1	1	3/5	Old Trafford Cricket Ground, Manchester	Away	2 July 1998	Drawn
8 ‡	134	West Indies	1	3	5/5	SuperSport Park, Centurion	Home	15 January 1999	Won
9	128	New Zealand	1	1	1/3	Eden Park, Auckland	Away	27 February 1999	Drawn
10 ‡	275	England	1	3	3/5	Kingsmead Cricket Ground, Durban	Home	26 December 1999	Drawn
11 ‡	180	Sri Lanka	2	1	1/3	Kingsmead Cricket Ground, Durban	Home	26 December 2000	Drawn
12 ‡	150	West Indies	1	2	1/5	Bourda Cricket Ground, Georgetown	Away	9 March 2001	Drawn
13	220	Zimbabwe	2	1	1/2	Harare Sports Club, Harare	Away	7 September 2001	Won
14	153	Australia	2	3	3/3	Sydney Cricket Ground, Sydney	Away	2 January 2002	Lost
15	150	Bangladesh	3	1	1/2	Buffalo Park, East London	Home	18 October 2002	Won
16	160	Bangladesh	3	2	2/2	Senwes Park, Potchefstroom	Home	25 October 2002	Won
17	108	England	3	2	2/5	Lord's Cricket Ground, London	Away	31 July 2003	Won
18 ‡	130	England	3	1	4/5	Headingley, Leeds	Away	21 August 2003	Won
19 ‡	118	Pakistan	4	3	2/2	Iqbal Stadium, Faisalabad	Away	24 October 2003	Drawn
20	137	West Indies	5	2	2/4	Kingsmead Cricket Ground, Durban	Home	26 December 2003	Won
21	137	New Zealand	5	1	1/3	Westpac Park, Hamilton	Away	10 March 2004	Drawn

== One Day International centuries ==
List of ODI centuries scored by Gary Kirsten
No.	Score	Balls	Against	Pos.	Inn.	S/R	Venue	H/A/N	Date	Result
1	112*	137	Australia	2	1	81.75	Melbourne Cricket Ground, Melbourne	Away	21 January 1994	Won
2 ‡	116	126	England	2	2	92.06	SuperSport Park, Centurion	Home	14 January 1996	Won
3 ‡	188*	159	United Arab Emirates	2	1	118.23	Rawalpindi Cricket Stadium, Rawalpindi	Neutral	16 February 1996	Won
4	106	116	India	1	1	91.37	Sharjah Cricket Association Stadium, Sharjah	Neutral	14 April 1996	Won
5 ‡	115*	142	India	1	1	80.98	Sharjah Cricket Association Stadium, Sharjah	Neutral	19 April 1996	Won
6 ‡	118*	127	Pakistan	2	2	92.91	Nairobi Gymkhana Club, Nairobi	Neutral	6 October 1996	Won
7 ‡	105*	134	Australia	2	2	78.35	Nehru Stadium, Indore	Away	19 October 1996	Won
8 ‡	103	113	New Zealand	1	1	91.15	Brisbane Cricket Ground, Brisbane	Neutral	9 January 1998	Won
9 ‡	115	123	India	1	1	93.49	Nehru Stadium, Kochi	Away	9 March 2000	Lost
10 ‡	101	107	New Zealand	2	2	94.39	De Beers Diamond Oval, Kimberley	Home	28 October 2000	Won
11 ‡	133*	155	India	1	2	85.80	The Wanderers Stadium, Johannesburg	Home	5 October 2001	Won
12	124	130	Kenya	1	1	95.38	Newlands Cricket Ground, Cape Town	Home	22 October 2001	Won
13 ‡	102*	118	Pakistan	2	2	86.44	Boland Park, Paarl	Home	16 December 2002	Won
