= University Teaching Department Ground =

Multi purpose stadium in Sagar, Madhya Pradesh

- Full name: Dr. Hari Singh Gour University Ground
- Location: Sagar, Madhya Pradesh
- Owner: Dr. Hari Singh Gour University
- Operator: Dr. Hari Singh Gour University
- Capacity: n/a

Construction
- Groundbreaking: 1982
- Opened: 1982

Website
- Cricinfo

University Teaching Department Ground is a multi purpose stadium in Sagar, Madhya Pradesh. The ground is mainly used for organizing matches of football, cricket and other sports. The stadium has hosted a Ranji Trophy match in 1982 when Madhya Pradesh cricket team played against Rajasthan cricket team. but since then the stadium has hosted non-first-class matches.

== See also ==
- List of cricket grounds in Madhya Pradesh
