= Manohar Sharma =

Indian former first-class cricketer (born 1940)

Personal information
- Full name: Manohar Ratanlal Sharma
- Born: 8 August 1940 (age 86); Indore, Madhya Pradesh, India
- Batting: Right-handed
- Bowling: Right-arm off break
- Role: Batsman; occasional wicket-keeper

Domestic team information
- Years: Team
- 1959/60–1975/76: Madhya Pradesh
- 1964/65–1967/68: Services

Career statistics
Competition	FC	List A
Matches	66	1
Runs scored	3,733	9
Batting average	37.70	9.00
100s/50s	9/18	0/0
Top score	170	9
Balls bowled	1,774	–
Wickets	16	–
Bowling average	39.25	–
5 wickets in innings	0	–
10 wickets in match	0	n/a
Best bowling	3/18	–
Catches/stumpings	45/5	0/0
- Source: ESPNcricinfo, 5 February 2016

Manohar Sharma (born 8 August 1940) is an Indian former first-class cricketer who played for Madhya Pradesh and Services. He is the author of the book Humour in Cricket.

== Career ==
Appearing in 66 first-class matches from 1959/60 to 1975/76, Sharma played as a right-handed batsman who usually opened the innings. He was also an occasional wicket-keeper, apart from being a part-time off break bowler. He made 3733 runs at an average of more than 37 including nine centuries in his first-class career. He played most of his cricket for Madhya Pradesh and Services in the Ranji Trophy, while also making appearances for Hyderabad Cricket Association XI in the Moin-ud-Dowlah Gold Cup Tournament. He was never selected for the Indian team although being a regular member of Central Zone and North Zone teams in the Duleep Trophy.

In 2010, a book authored by Sharma called Humour in Cricket was released. Sharma has worked as the vice president of the Madhya Pradesh Cricket Association and chairman of its cricket development committee. As of 2015, he is the president of the Hyderabad State Veterans Cricket Association.
