= Ujjain International Stadium =

Proposed stadium in Ujjain, India

Ujjain International Cricket Stadium (Tentative)
- Ujjain Cricket Stadium
- Location: Ujjain, Madhya Pradesh, India
- Country: India
- Home club: Ujjain Divisional Cricket Association
- Capacity: 50,000 +
- Owner: Ujjain Development Authority
- Architect: n/a
- Operator: Madhya Pradesh Cricket Association
- Tenants: Madhya Pradesh cricket team
- End names
- n/a
- As of 1 December, 2015; Source: UDA

Ujjain Cricket Stadium is a proposed international stadium at Nanakheda, Ujjain in the Central Indian state of Madhya Pradesh. Ujjain Development Authority gave land to build a sport venue which includes cricket stadium, indoor stadium, tennis court, aquatic centre as well as stadia for other outdoor sports like athletics, football and hockey.

The proposed stadium will be built on a 30-acre site, which has been taken over by Ujjain Divisional Cricket Association. It will also be equipped with flood lights for night matches, a swimming pool, sauna bath, modern gym, dressing room, and 30 corporate boxes. This will be the fifth international stadium in Madhya Pradesh after the recent completion of Shrimant Madhavrao Scindia Cricket Stadium.
