= LCPE =

LCPE may refer to:

- Low Cost Pintle Engine (LCPE), the TR-106 rocket engine from TRW
- Lakshmibai College of Physical Education (LCPE), Gwalior, Madhya Pradesh, India; former name of the Lakshmibai National Institute of Physical Education (LNIPE)
- LCPE Ground, Gwalior, Madhya Pradesh, India; a ground, a multipurpose stadium
