= Railway Ground, Ratlam =

Multi purpose stadium in Ratlam, India

Railway Ground
- Railway Ground
- Interactive map of Railway Ground
- Full name: Railway Ground
- Location: Ratlam, Madhya Pradesh, India
- Coordinates: 23.343°N 75.048°E
- Owner: Western Railways
- Operator: Western Railways
- Capacity: 5,000

Construction
- Groundbreaking: 1952
- Opened: 1952

Website
- Cricinfo

Railway Ground is a multi purpose stadium located in Railway Colony in Ratlam, Madhya Pradesh, India. The ground is mainly used for organizing matches of football, cricket and other sports.

The stadium hosted one first-class matches from 1967 when Holkar cricket team played against Rajputana cricket team. until 1987 but since then the stadium has hosted non first-class cricket matches.
