= Holkar Stadium =

International cricket stadium in Indore, Madhya Pradesh, India

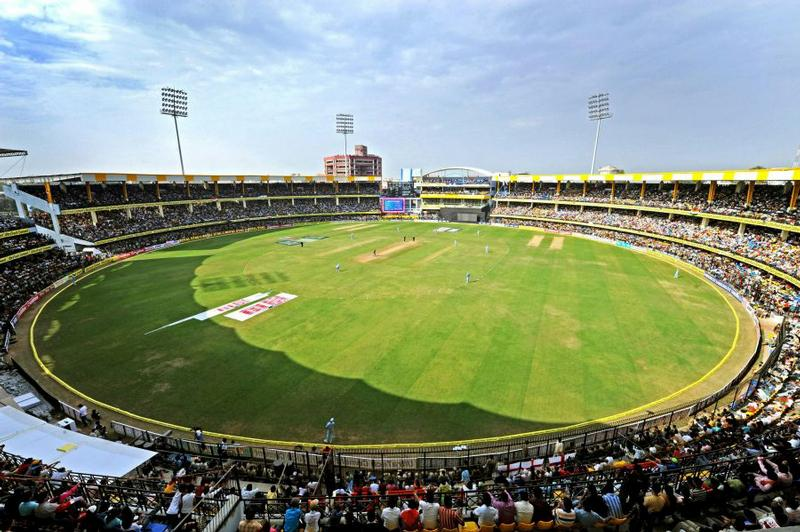
- Interactive map of Holkar Stadium

Ground information
- Location: Race course Rd, Indore, Indore district, Madhya Pradesh, India
- Coordinates: 22°43′27″N 75°52′46″E
- Home club: Madhya Pradesh cricket team Madhya Pradesh women's cricket team
- Capacity: 30,000
- Owner: Madhya Pradesh Cricket Association
- Operator: Madhya Pradesh Cricket Association
- Tenants: India national cricket team India women's cricket team Kochi Tuskers Kerala; Kings Xi Punjab

International information
- First men's Test: 8–11 October 2016: India v New Zealand
- Last men's Test: 1–3 March 2023: India v Australia
- First men's ODI: 15 April 2006: India v England
- Last men's ODI: 18 January 2026: India v New Zealand
- First men's T20I: 22 December 2017: India v Sri Lanka
- Last men's T20I: 14 January 2024: India v Afghanistan
- First women's ODI: 1 October 2025: Australia v New Zealand
- Last women's ODI: 25 October 2025: Australia v South Africa
- As of 18 January 2026; Source: ESPNcricinfo

Holkar Cricket Stadium is located in Indore, Madhya Pradesh, India. It is owned and operated by Madhya Pradesh Cricket Association and serves as its headquarter. It is the home ground of Madhya Pradesh cricket team as well as MP women's team.

It was formerly known as Maharani Usharaje Trust Cricket Ground. In 2010, Madhya Pradesh Cricket Association renamed it after the Holkar dynasty of the Maratha Empire that ruled Indore State. Holkar stadium's ground is very small, its square boundaries are only 56 meters long. in 2006 it hosted its first One Day International, since then it regularly hosts International matches.

Indore city has another cricket stadium, Nehru Stadium which was used for International matches until 31 March 2001.

It has a seating capacity of around 30,000 spectators. It is equipped with flood lights for night matches. Virender Sehwag recorded the third highest ODI score of 219 at this ground. Gwalior's Captain Roop Singh Stadium, another international stadium in Madhya Pradesh, is a bit smaller in capacity than Indore's Holkar Cricket Stadium.

The ground stages the majority of Madhya Pradesh cricket team's home matches in the Ranji Trophy. On 8 October 2016, It hosted its first ever Test match when India played against New Zealand. It became the twenty-second test venue in India.

== History ==
The credit for giving land for the stadium goes to the Holkar's of the Maratha Confederacy. The ruling Maratha family of Indore State encouraged and pioneered cricket in this part of the country. Holkar cricket team appeared in ten Ranji Trophy season's, reaching the final eight times and winning the title four times.

It is on the some part of this ground that an older stadium was present where the Holkar's cricket team won its three Ranji Trophy titles, in the late 1940s and early 1950s. In this sense, some part of this stadium has seen greats like C.K. Nayudu and Mushtaq Ali playing for Ranji Trophy.

The stadium has hosted a total of 7 ODIs (2006, 2008, 2011, 2015, 2017, January 2023 and September 2023), 3 Tests (2016, 2019 and 2023) and 4 T20Is (2017, 2020, 2022 and 2024). Apart from these the venue has witnessed a total of 9 IPL matches. Since the stadium's inauguration, Team India had a 100% winning record until 4 October 2022, losing to South Africa by 49 runs in a T20I match during the South Africa Tour of India in 2022.

The first match was staged on 15 April 2006, India successfully chased 289 to complete a 5–0 series win on England in what was a dead rubber. Its second international match came two and a half years later when England next toured, India again winning. The rest three ODIs were against West Indies, South Africa and Australia.

The Stadium hosted its first ever IPL match on 13 May 2011. The Jawaharlal Nehru Stadium, Kochi is the home venue for the Indian Premier League team Kochi Tuskers Kerala and officially hosted 5 home-matches of the franchise. The remaining 2 home matches were played at the Holkar Cricket Stadium. In 2017, Kings XI Punjab selected the Holkar stadium as one of their home grounds for three IPL matches.

Virender Sehwag made the highest runs in a limited over innings of cricket 219 here on 8 December 2011 against West Indies, which was later broken by Rohit Sharma.

In November 2015, the stadium was selected to be one of the six new Test venues along with Maharashtra Cricket Association Stadium, JSCA International Stadium Complex, Saurashtra Cricket Association Stadium, Himachal Pradesh Cricket Association Stadium and Dr. Y.S. Rajasekhara Reddy ACA-VDCA Cricket Stadium in India.

Holkar Stadium hosted its first Test match in October 2016 when New Zealand cricket team toured India. India defeated New Zealand by 321 runs on the fourth day to complete a 3–0 series whitewash. The second Test match was played between India and Bangladesh in 2019.

The Stadium was selected to host the final of the 2016-17 edition of the Ranji Trophy from 10 January 2017.

Stadium hosted 2 international matches in 2017, One Day International between Indian Cricket Team & Australian Cricket Team was played on 24 September 2017 whereas T20 International between Indian Cricket Team & Sri Lanka Cricket Team was played in December 2017. In this T20I match Rohit Sharma scored his 2nd T20I century. He scored 118 runs from 43 balls

== Names of places in stadium ==
In 2011, a committee was formed to decide the naming of Pavilion, Dressing Rooms and Stands/Galleries around the stadium. This committee had Surya Prakash Chaturvedi as the chairman. As per the recommendations of the committee following landmarks have been named :

- Press Box named after HH Maharaja Madhav Rao Scindia of Gwalior State (President of Madhya Pradesh Cricket Association & Board of Control for Cricket in India)
- Pavilion's named after Col. C.K. Nayudu (India's First Test Captain) and Capt. Mushtaq Ali (First Asian batsman to score a century).
- Dressing Room's named after Mansur Ali Khan Pataudi (Born in Bhopal) and Rahul Dravid (Born in Indore).
- Stadium Gates named after former International cricketers from this part of the country, who are Narendra Hirwani, Amay Khurasia and Rajesh Chauhan.
- One of the two galleries contains Stands named after greats of Indian cricket like Vijay Hazare, Ajit Wadekar, Sunil Gavaskar, Kapil Dev, Sachin Tendulkar and Anil Kumble. The other gallery contains stands named after greats of Holkar era like J. N. Bhaya, M. M. Jagdale, Khandu Rangnekar, Hiralal Gaekwad, Chandu Sarwate and C. S. Nayudu. This combination of current and former cricketers named opposite to each other is unique in itself and not been seen elsewhere.
- The commentators' Box in the stadium has been named after Sushil Doshi, renowned Hindi commentator.

== List of international matches ==
=== Test Matches ===
No.	Home team	Away team	Winner	Margin	Date	Scorecard	Notes
1	India	New Zealand	India	321 runs	8–11 October 2016	Scorecard	
2	India	Bangladesh	India	Innings & 130 runs	14–16 November 2019	Scorecard	
3	India	Australia	Australia	9 wickets	1–3 March 2023	Scorecard	India's first defeat at this venue.

=== One-day Internationals ===
No.	Home team	Away team	Winner	Margin	Date	Scorecard	Notes
1	India	England	India	7 wickets	15 April 2006	Scorecard	
2	India	England	India	54 runs	17 November 2008	Scorecard	
3	India	West Indies	India	153 runs	8 December 2011	Scorecard	India's highest total till date in ODI
4	India	South Africa	India	22 runs	14 October 2015	Scorecard	
5	India	Australia	India	5 wickets	24 September 2017	Scorecard	
6	India	New Zealand	India	90 runs	24 January 2023	Scorecard	
7	India	Australia	India	99 runs (DLS Method)	24 September 2023	Scorecard	India's second highest score in this stadium. India's highest runs against Australia.
8	India	New Zealand	New Zealand	41 runs	18 January 2026	Scorecard	India's first defeat in this format at this venue.

=== Twenty20 Internationals ===
No.	Home team	Away team	Winner	Margin	Date	Scorecard	Notes
1	India	Sri Lanka	India	88 runs	22 December 2017	Scorecard	
2	India	Sri Lanka	India	7 wickets	7 January 2020	Scorecard	
3	India	South Africa	South Africa	49 runs	4 October 2022	Scorecard	India's first defeat in this format at this venue.
4	India	Afghanistan	India	6 wickets	14 January 2024	Scorecard	

=== Women's One Day Internationals ===
No.	Home team	Away team	Winner	Margin	Date	Scorecard	Notes
1	Australia	New Zealand	Australia	89 runs	1 October 2025	Scorecard	This was the first women's ODI to be played at this venue. Phoebe Litchfield (Aus) scored her 1,000th run in ODIs. Amelia Kerr (NZ) took her 100th wicket in ODIs. Sophie Devine (NZ) scored her 4,000th run in ODIs.
2	New Zealand	South Africa	South Africa	6 wickets	6 October 2025	Scorecard	Suzie Bates (NZ) became the first women's cricketer to make 350 appearances in international cricket. Sophie Devine (NZ) played in her 300th international match. Chloe Tryon (SA) took her 100th wicket in international cricket. Laura Wolvaardt (SA) scored her 7,000th run in international cricket.
3	India	England	England	4 runs	19 October 2025	Scorecard	Heather Knight (Eng) played in her 300th international match. Deepti Sharma (IND) became the second bowler and first spinner for India to take 150 wickets in ODIs.
4	Australia	England	Australia	6 wickets	22 October 2025	Scorecard	
5	Australia	South Africa	Australia	7 wickets	25 October 2025	Scorecard	

== List of international centuries ==
=== Key ===
- * denotes that the batsman was not out.
- Inns. denotes the number of the innings in the match.
- Balls denotes the number of balls faced in an innings.
- NR denotes that the number of balls was not recorded.
- Parentheses next to the player's score denotes his century number at Holkar Stadium.
- The column title Date refers to the date the match started.
- The column title Result refers to the player's team result

=== Test Centuries ===
No.	Score	Player	Team	Balls	Inns.	Opposing team	Date	Result
1	211	Virat Kohli	India	366	1	New Zealand	8–11 October 2016	Won
2	188	Ajinkya Rahane	India	381	1	New Zealand	8–11 October 2016	Won
3	101*	Cheteshwar Pujara	India	148	3	New Zealand	8–11 October 2016	Won
4	243	Mayank Agarwal	India	330	2	Bangladesh	14–16 November 2019	Won

=== One Day Internationals ===
No.	Score	Player	Team	Balls	Inns.	Opposing team	Date	Result
1	118	Yuvraj Singh	India	122	1	England	17 November 2008	Won
2	219	Virender Sehwag	India	149	1	West Indies	8 December 2011	Won
3	124	Aaron Finch	Australia	125	1	India	24 September 2017	Lost
4	101	Rohit Sharma	India	85	1	New Zealand	24 January 2023	Won
5	112	Shubman Gill	India	78	1	New Zealand	24 January 2023	Won
6	138	Devon Conway	New Zealand	100	1	India	24 January 2023	Lost
7	105	Shreyas Iyer	India	90	1	Australia	24 September 2023	Won
8	104	Shubman Gill	India	97	1	Australia	24 September 2023	Won
9	137	Daryl Mitchell	New Zealand	131	1	India	18 January 2026	Won
10	106	Glenn Phillips	New Zealand	88	1	India	18 January 2026	Won
11	124	Virat Kohli	India	108	2	New Zealand	18 January 2026	Lost

=== Twenty20 Internationals ===
No.	Score	Player	Team	Balls	Inns.	Opposing team	Date	Result
1	118	Rohit Sharma	India	43	1	Sri Lanka	22 December 2017	Won
2	100*	Rilee Rossouw	South Africa	48	1	India	4 October 2022	Won

=== Women's One Day Internationals ===
No.	Score	Player	Team	Balls	Inns.	Opposing Team	Date	Result
1	115	Ashleigh Gardner	Australia	83	1	New Zealand	1 October 2025	Won
2	112	Sophie Devine	New Zealand	112	2	Australia	1 October 2025	Lost
3	101	Tazmin Brits	South Africa	89	2	New Zealand	6 October 2025	Won
4	109	Heather Knight	England	91	1	India	19 October 2025	Won
5	104*	Ashleigh Gardner	Australia	73	2	England	22 October 2025	Won

== List of five wicket hauls ==
=== Tests ===
Five-wicket hauls in Men's Test matches at Holkar Stadium
No.	Bowler	Team	Opposing Team	Inn	O	R	W	Date	Result
1	Ravichandran Ashwin	India	New Zealand	2	27.2	81	6	8 October 2016	Won
2	Ravichandran Ashwin	India	New Zealand	4	13.5	59	7	8 October 2016	Won
3	Matthew Kuhnemann	Australia	India	1	9	16	5	1 March 2023	Won
4	Nathan Lyon	Australia	India	3	23.3	64	8	1 March 2023	Won

=== One Day Internationals ===
Five-wicket hauls in Men's ODI matches at Holkar Stadium
No.	Bowler	Team	Opposing Team	Inn	O	R	W	Date	Result
1	S. Sreesanth	India	England	1	10	55	6	15 April 2006	Won

=== Women's One Day Internationals ===
Five-wicket hauls in Women's ODI matches at Holkar Stadium
No.	Bowler	Team	Opposing Team	Inn	O	R	W	Date	Result
1	Alana King	Australia	South Africa	1	7	18	7	25 October 2025	Won

== See also ==
- Daly College Ground
- Yeshwant Club Ground
- Gwalior International Cricket Stadium
