= Grasim Industries Ground =

Multi-purpose stadium in Nagda, India

- Full name: Grasim Industries Ground
- Location: Nagda, India
- Owner: Grasim Industries
- Operator: Grasim Industries

Construction
- Groundbreaking: 1988
- Opened: 1988

Website
- ESPNcricinfo

Grasim Industries Ground is a multi-purpose stadium in Nagda, India. The ground is mainly used for organizing matches of football, cricket and other sports. The stadium hosted one first-class match in 1988 when Madhya Pradesh cricket team played against Vidarbha cricket team. Since then the stadium has not hosted any cricket matches.
