= Shrimant Madhavrao Scindia Cricket Stadium =

International cricket stadium in Gwalior, Madhya Pradesh, India

- Gwalior International Stadium
- Interactive map of Shrimant Madhavrao Scindia Cricket Stadium
- Former names: Gwalior International Cricket Stadium
- Address: Magnet City, Off Agra-Mumbai Highway, Gwalior West, Gwalior, Madhya Pradesh, India; Gwalior; India
- Location: Gwalior West, Gwalior, Madhya Pradesh, India
- Coordinates: 26°14′05″N 78°07′31″E
- Owner: Madhya Pradesh Cricket Association
- Operator: Madhya Pradesh Cricket Association
- Seating type: Stadium seating
- Capacity: 30,000 (First stage) & 50,000 (Final stage)

Construction
- Opened: 15 June 2024

Tenants
- India Men's National Cricket Team; Madhya Pradesh women's cricket team; Madhya Pradesh cricket team

Website
- Shrimant Madhavrao Scindia Cricket Stadium

Ground information
- End names
- n/a n/a

International information
- Only men's T20I: 6 October 2024: India v Bangladesh
- As of 6 October 2024; Source: ESPNcricinfo

Shrimant Madhavrao Scindia Cricket Stadium is an international cricket stadium at Shankarpur which is located in Gwalior. It is constructed by the Madhya Pradesh Cricket Association. The stadium is built on a land of 30 acres, which has been taken over by Madhya Pradesh Cricket Association under the supervision of cricketer and fast bowler Raja Naney from Malviya Nagar. The project will be completed in two stages, total seating capacity after final stage will be 50,000. The stadium is equipped with 9 playing pitches and full length boundary as per international dimensions, flood lights for night matches, practice ground and practice facility including indoor training centre, swimming pools, sauna bath, modern gym, dressing rooms for teams, match officials, anti doping requirements etc., washrooms with facilities like Jacuzzi tech., conference rooms, media rooms and 30 corporate boxes.

The stadium is situated at Shankarpur, Magnet City in Gwalior West on Mumbai Agra Highway. (Former National Highway 3).

Captain Roop Singh Stadium is another stadium which has hosted world cup and other international matches in Gwalior.

== History ==
Historically, MPCA has been staging International matches at cities of Gwalior and Indore.

After the development of MPCA's own stadium at Indore (Holkar Stadium), the work for construction of stadium at Gwalior commenced in 2011 and appropriate sized land plot (approx. 30 acres) was procured. This land is situated off the Mumbai – Agra bypass and is about 8 kilometers from the heritage city of Gwalior.

After developing the playfield, MPCA has initiated the work of stadium development. The project was to be completed in two stages viz. first stage with a capacity of approx. 30,000. Depending upon the situation, the stadium can be enhanced with an increased capacity by another 20,000, thus making the total capacity 50,000.

This stadium has been named after Madhavrao Scindia who was the BCCI president and Union Minister for Railways and Civil Aviation in the Government of India under PV Narasimha Rao's cabinet. He was a member of the Indian National Congress, and was the son of Jiwajirao Scindia, the last ruling Maharaja of the erstwhile Gwalior State.

== International Matches ==
This stadium hosted the opening T20I between India and Bangladesh scheduled on October 6, thus marking the inaugural international fixture at the city's new stadium, first in the city since the historic India-South Africa ODI in 2010, where Sachin Tendulkar became the first cricketer to score a double century in ODIs.

== See also ==
- Sports in Madhya Pradesh
- Holkar Stadium, Indore
- Mahadji Scindia Sports Complex
- Saifai International Cricket Stadium
