= New Digamber Public School Ground =

Cricket ground in Indore, India

NDPS Cricket Academy Ground
- Location: Indore, Madhya Pradesh
- Country: India
- Establishment: 2005
- Capacity: 5,000
- Owner: New Digamber Public School
- Operator: NDPS Cricket Academy
- Tenants: Madhya Pradesh cricket team NDPS Cricket Team

New Digamber Public School Ground is ground located in the campus of New Digamber Public School, Indore, Madhya Pradesh, India. The ground was founded in 2001. The ground has got pavilion and can accommodate 5000 persons. It has basketball and volleyball courts and a five international level cricket practice nets along with one gymnasium hall. It also has facilities for swimming, table tennis, billiards, and tennis courts. It has one main clubhouse.

The ground has hosted two List A matches when Rajasthan cricket team played against Vidarbha cricket team in 2009 Vijay Hazare Trophy. The ground has hosted one more List A match Rajasthan cricket team played against Railways cricket team in 2009. Since then the ground has hosted non-first-class matches.
