= Garrison Ground =

Stadium in Jabalpur, Madhya Pradesh

- Interactive map of Garrison Ground
- Full name: Garrison Ground
- Location: Jabalpur, Madhya Pradesh
- Coordinates: 23.155°N 79.950°E
- Owner: Jabalpur Municipal Corporation
- Operator: Jabalpur Municipal Corporation
- Capacity: 5,000

Construction
- Groundbreaking: 1953
- Opened: 1953

Website
- cricketarchive

Garrison Ground is a multi purpose stadium in Jabalpur, Madhya Pradesh. The ground is mainly used for organizing matches of football, cricket and other sports. The stadium has hosted three first-class matches in 1953 when Madhya Pradesh cricket team played against Holkar cricket team. The ground hosted two more first-class matches from 1958 to 1962 but since then the stadium has hosted non-first-class matches.
