= Industrial Training Institute Ground =

Stadium in Indore, Madhya Pradesh, India

- ITI Ground
- Interactive map of Industrial Training Institute Ground
- Full name: Industrial Training Institute Ground
- Former names: Gymkhana Ground
- Location: Indore, Madhya Pradesh, India
- Coordinates: 22.753°N 75.870°E
- Capacity: n/a

Construction
- Groundbreaking: 1989
- Opened: 1989

Website
- ESPNcricinfo

Industrial Training Institute Ground is a multipurpose stadium in Indore, Madhya Pradesh, India. The ground is mainly used for organizing matches of football, cricket and other sports.

The stadium hosted first-class matches from 1989, when Madhya Pradesh cricket team played against Uttar Pradesh cricket team in a tour match, until 1965. Since then, the ground has hosted non-first-class matches.
