= Bharat Heavy Electrical Ltd Sports Complex =

Multi purpose stadium in Bhopal, Madhya Pradesh, India

Coordinates: 23.225°N 77.455°E

- BHEL Stadium
- Interactive map of Bharat Heavy Electrical Ltd Sports Complex
- Full name: Bharat Heavy Electrical Ltd Sports Complex
- Former names: BHEL Stadium
- Location: Bhopal, Madhya Pradesh, India
- Owner: Bharat Heavy Electricals
- Operator: Bharat Heavy Electricals
- Capacity: 20,000

Construction
- Groundbreaking: 1987
- Opened: 1987

Website
- ESPNcricinfo

Bharat Heavy Electrical Ltd Sports Complex or BHEL Stadium is a multi purpose stadium in Bhopal, Madhya Pradesh, India. The ground is mainly used for organizing matches of football, cricket and other sports.

The stadium hosted four first-class matches from 1987 when Madhya Pradesh cricket team played against Rajasthan cricket team. until 1994.

The stadium hosted four List A matches from 1994 when Madhya Pradesh cricket team played against Rajasthan cricket team. but since then the stadium has hosted non first-class cricket matches.
