= Madhya Pradesh Cricket Association Ground, Jabalpur =

Multi-purpose stadium in Jabalpur, India

Coordinates: 23.083°N 80.023°E

Madhya Pradesh Cricket Association Ground
- MPCA Ground
- Interactive map of Madhya Pradesh Cricket Association Ground
- Full name: Madhya Pradesh Cricket Association Ground
- Former names: Neemkheda Stadium
- Location: Jabalpur, Madhya Pradesh
- Owner: Madhya Pradesh Cricket Association
- Operator: Madhya Pradesh Cricket Association
- Capacity: 5,000

Construction
- Groundbreaking: 2012
- Opened: 2012

Website
- cricketarchive

Madhya Pradesh Cricket Association Ground or Neemkheda Stadium is a multi-purpose stadium in Jabalpur, Madhya Pradesh, India. The ground is mainly used for organizing matches of football, cricket and other sports. The ground has floodlights so that the stadium can host day-night matches. It is made considering all norms of BCCI so that Ranji Trophy matches can be played. The stadium was established in 2012 when the stadium hosted a match of Dr Shafquat Mohammed Khan Under-18 Inter Divisional Tournament 2011/12 between Jabalpur Under-18s v Narmadapuram Under-18s.
