= Madhya Pradesh Cricket Association Ground, Sagar =

Multi-purpose stadium in Sagar, India

Madhya Pradesh Cricket Association Ground
- MPCA Ground
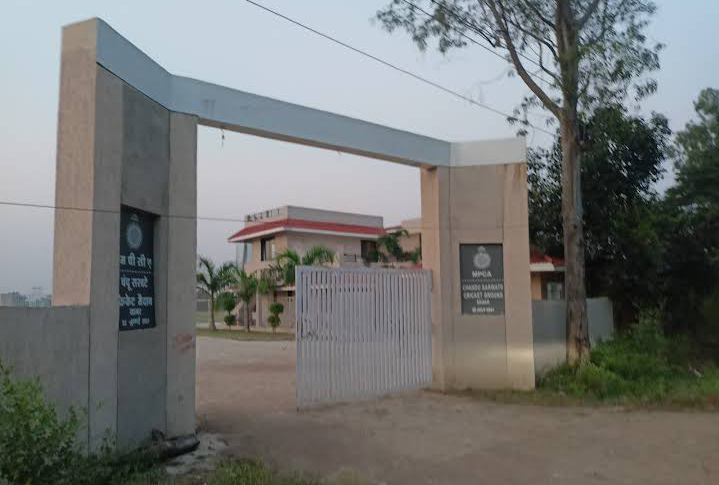
- Interactive map of Madhya Pradesh Cricket Association Ground
- Full name: Madhya Pradesh Cricket Association Ground
- Location: Sagar, Madhya Pradesh
- Coordinates: 23.840°N 78.709°E
- Owner: Madhya Pradesh Cricket Association
- Operator: Madhya Pradesh Cricket Association
- Capacity: 5,000

Construction
- Groundbreaking: 2010
- Opened: 2010

Website
- cricketarchive

Madhya Pradesh Cricket Association Ground or Chandu Sarwate Stadium is a multi-purpose stadium in Sagar, Madhya Pradesh. The ground is mainly used for organizing matches of football, cricket and other sports. The ground has floodlights so that the stadium can host day-night matches. It was made considering all norms of BCCI so that Ranji Trophy matches can be played. The stadium was established in 2010 when the stadium hosted a match of Maharaja Yeshwant Rao Memorial Inter Divisional Tournament 2010/11 between Sagar and Gwalior.
