= Indian Iron and Steel Company Stanton Pipe Factory Ground =

Cricket ground in Ujjain, India

- Pipe Factory Ground
- Location: Ujjain, Madhya Pradesh, India
- Establishment: 1977
- Capacity: n/a
- Owner: Indian Iron and Steel Company Stanton Pipe Factory
- Architect: n/a
- Operator: Ujjain Division Cricket Association; Madhya Pradesh Cricket Association
- Tenants: Ujjain Division cricket team Madhya Pradesh cricket team
- End names
- n/a
- As of 21 August 2015; Source: Ground Info

Indian Iron and Steel Company Stanton Pipe Factory Ground or Pipe Factory Ground is a cricket ground Ujjain, Madhya Pradesh. The ground hosted two Ranji matches for the Madhya Pradesh cricket team in 1977 against Railways cricket team which was abandoned without a ball being played and again in 1980 against Rajasthan cricket team, when the match was a draw.
