= Abbas Ali (cricketer) =

Indian cricketer (born 1976)

Syed Abbas Ali (born 20 February 1976), in Indore is a former Indian first class cricketer. He is a left-handed batsman. Ali debuted in 1996/97 and scored his career best score of 251 in the following season. This was a Madhya Pradesh record at that time, which was bettered two years later by Jai Yadav who made 265 runs in an innings. Ali played for Delhi Giants in the Indian Cricket League. He has also played for ICL India XI.

He is the grandson of the former Indian cricketer Mushtaq Ali.
