= Yeshwant Club Ground =

Cricket ground in Indore, India

- Yeshwant Club
- Interactive map of Yeshwant Club Ground
- Full name: Yeshwant Club Ground
- Location: Indore, Madhya Pradesh, India
- Coordinates: 22.724°N 75.876°E
- Owner: Yeshwant Club
- Operator: Yeshwant Club
- Capacity: n/a

Construction
- Groundbreaking: 1935
- Opened: 1935

Website
- Cricinfo

Yeshwant Club Ground is a cricket ground located at the Yeshwant Club in Indore, Madhya Pradesh, India.

The stadium hosted 35 first-class matches from 1935 when Central India cricket team played against Australian cricket team in a tour match. until 1960. Since then the ground has hosted non-first-class matches.

== See also ==
- Daly College Ground
- Holkar Stadium
