= Bhopal Sugar Industries Ground =

Multi purpose stadium in Sehore, India

Coordinates: 23.209°N 77.076°E

- Bhopal Sugar Industries Ground
- Interactive map of Bhopal Sugar Industries Ground
- Full name: Bhopal Sugar Industries Ground
- Former names: Sugar Industries Ground
- Location: Sehore, Madhya Pradesh, India
- Owner: Bhopal Sugar Industries
- Operator: Bhopal Sugar Industries
- Capacity: n/a

Construction
- Groundbreaking: 1984
- Opened: 1984

Website
- ESPNcricinfo

Bhopal Sugar Industries Ground is a multi purpose stadium in Sehore, Madhya Pradesh, India. The ground is mainly used for organizing matches of football, cricket and other sports.

The stadium hosted one first-class matches from 1985 when Madhya Pradesh cricket team played against Vidarbha cricket team. Since then the ground has hosted non-first-class matches.
