= MIT Ground =

Stadium in Ujjain, India

Coordinates: 23°05′48″N 75°53′37″E

Mahakal Institute of Technology Ground
- MIT Ground
- Interactive map of Mahakal Institute of Technology Ground
- Full name: Mahakal Institute of Technology Ground
- Location: Ujjain, Madhya Pradesh
- Owner: Mahakal Institute of Technology
- Operator: Mahakal Institute of Technology
- Capacity: 5,000

Construction
- Groundbreaking: 2005
- Opened: 2005
- Renovated: 2013

Website
- cricketarchive

Mahakal Institute of Technology Ground or MIT Ground is a multi-purpose stadium in Ujjain, Madhya Pradesh. The ground is mainly used for organizing matches of football, cricket and other sports. The ground has floodlights so that the stadium can host day-night matches. It was made considering all norms of BCCI so that Ranji Trophy matches can be played. The stadium was established in 2013 when they hosted a match of MM Jagdale Under-15 Inter Divisional Tournament between Ujjain Under-15s and Bhopal Under-15s.
