= Bangladeshi cricket team in India in 2024–25 =

International cricket tour

	India	Bangladesh
- Dates: 19 September – 12 October 2024
Captains	Rohit Sharma (Tests); Suryakumar Yadav (T20Is)	Najmul Hossain Shanto

Test series
- Result: India won the 2-match series 2–0
Most runs	Yashasvi Jaiswal (189)	Najmul Hossain Shanto (152)
Most wickets	Jasprit Bumrah (11); Ravichandran Ashwin (11)	Mehidy Hasan Miraz (9)
- Player of the series: Ravichandran Ashwin (Ind)

Twenty20 International series
- Results: India won the 3-match series 3–0
Most runs	Sanju Samson (150)	Towhid Hridoy (77)
Most wickets	Varun Chakravarthy (5)	Tanzim Hasan Sakib (5)
- Player of the series: Hardik Pandya (Ind)

The Bangladesh cricket team toured India in September and October 2024 to play against the India cricket team. The tour consisted of two Test and three Twenty20 International (T20I) matches. The Test series formed part of the 2023–2025 ICC World Test Championship. In June 2024, the Board of Control for Cricket in India (BCCI) confirmed the fixtures for the tour as a part of the 2024–25 home international season.

On 13 August 2024, BCCI moved the venue of the first T20I from the Himachal Pradesh Cricket Association Stadium in Dharamshala to the Shrimant Madhavrao Scindia Cricket Stadium in Gwalior due to upgrades and renovation work in the dressing rooms.

== Squads ==
India		Bangladesh	
Tests	T20Is	Tests	T20Is
Rohit Sharma (c); Ravichandran Ashwin; Jasprit Bumrah; Yash Dayal; Akash Deep; Shubman Gill; Ravindra Jadeja; Yashasvi Jaiswal; Dhruv Jurel (wk); Sarfaraz Khan; Virat Kohli; Rishabh Pant (wk); Axar Patel; KL Rahul; Mohammed Siraj; Kuldeep Yadav	Suryakumar Yadav (c); Ravi Bishnoi; Varun Chakravarthy; ~~Shivam Dube~~; Hardik Pandya; Riyan Parag; Harshit Rana; Nitish Kumar Reddy; Sanju Samson (wk); Abhishek Sharma; Jitesh Sharma (wk); Arshdeep Singh; Rinku Singh; Washington Sundar; Tilak Varma; Mayank Yadav	Najmul Hossain Shanto (c); Khaled Ahmed; Taskin Ahmed; Jaker Ali (wk); Shakib Al Hasan; Liton Das (wk); Zakir Hasan (wk); Nayeem Hasan; Mahmudul Hasan Joy; Mehidy Hasan Miraz; Mominul Haque; Shadman Islam; Taijul Islam; Hasan Mahmud; Mushfiqur Rahim (wk); Nahid Rana	Najmul Hossain Shanto (c); Taskin Ahmed; Jaker Ali; Liton Das (wk); Mahedi Hasan; Rakibul Hasan; Tanzid Hasan; Parvez Hossain Emon; Rishad Hossain; Towhid Hridoy; Shoriful Islam; Mahmudullah; Mehidy Hasan Miraz; Mustafizur Rahman; Tanzim Hasan Sakib

On 5 October, Shivam Dube was ruled out of the T20I series due to back injury. Tilak Varma was named as his replacement.

== Test series ==
=== 1st Test ===
19–22 September 2024
Scorecard

India	v	Bangladesh
376 (91.2 overs); Ravichandran Ashwin 113 (133); Hasan Mahmud 5/83 (22.2 overs)		149 (47.1 overs); Shakib Al Hasan 32 (64); Jasprit Bumrah 4/50 (11 overs)
287/4d (64 overs); Shubman Gill 119* (176); Mehidy Hasan Miraz 2/103 (25 overs)		234 (62.1 overs); Najmul Hossain Shanto 82 (127); Ravichandran Ashwin 6/88 (21 overs)

India won by 280 runs
M. A. Chidambaram Stadium, Chennai
Umpires: Richard Kettleborough (Eng) and Rod Tucker (Aus)
Player of the match: Ravichandran Ashwin (Ind)

- Bangladesh won the toss and elected to field.
- The 17 wickets to fall on day 2 were the most on a single day in a Test match at this ground.
- In Bangladesh's second innings, Ravichandran Ashwin passed Courtney Walsh on the list of bowlers with the most wickets in Tests.
- World Test Championship points: India 12, Bangladesh 0.

=== 2nd Test ===
27 September – 1 October 2024
Scorecard

Bangladesh	v	India
233 (74.2 overs); Mominul Haque 107* (194); Jasprit Bumrah 3/50 (18 overs)		285/9d (34.4 overs); Yashasvi Jaiswal 72 (51); Mehidy Hasan Miraz 4/41 (6.4 overs)
146 (47 overs); Shadman Islam 50 (101); Jasprit Bumrah 3/17 (10 overs)		98/3 (17.2 overs); Yashasvi Jaiswal 51 (45); Mehidy Hasan Miraz 2/44 (9 overs)

India won by 7 wickets
Green Park Stadium, Kanpur
Umpires: Chris Brown (NZ) and Richard Kettleborough (Eng)
Player of the match: Yashasvi Jaiswal (Ind)

- India won the toss and elected to field.
- Only 35 overs of play was possible on Day 1 and no play was possible on Day 2 and Day 3 due to rain and wet outfield.
- Ravindra Jadeja (Ind) became the 39th person to take 300 Tests wickets, from fewer deliveries (11,817) than any player before him.
- Virat Kohli (Ind) became the fastest to complete 27,000 runs in international cricket, in terms of innings (594).
- India's match run rate of 7.36 was the highest in Test history, breaking the previous record of 6.80 set by South Africa in the first Test against Zimbabwe at Cape Town in 2005.
- World Test Championship points: India 12, Bangladesh 0.

== T20I series ==
=== 1st T20I ===
6 October 2024
19:00 (N)
Scorecard

Bangladesh; 127 (19.5 overs)	v	India; 132/3 (11.5 overs)
Mehidy Hasan Miraz 35* (32); Arshdeep Singh 3/14 (3.5 overs)		Hardik Pandya 39* (16); Mehidy Hasan Miraz 1/7 (1 over)

India won by 7 wickets
Shrimant Madhavrao Scindia Cricket Stadium, Gwalior
Umpires: K. N. Ananthapadmanabhan (Ind) and Jayaraman Madanagopal (Ind)
Player of the match: Arshdeep Singh (Ind)

- India won the toss and elected to field.
- Nitish Kumar Reddy and Mayank Yadav (Ind) both made their T20I debuts.
- It was the first T20I to be played at this venue and the 26th T20I venue in India to host an international cricket match.

=== 2nd T20I ===
9 October 2024
19:00 (N)
Scorecard

India; 221/9 (20 overs)	v	Bangladesh; 135/9 (20 overs)
Nitish Kumar Reddy 74 (34); Rishad Hossain 3/55 (4 overs)		Mahmudullah 41 (39); Varun Chakravarthy 2/19 (4 overs)

India won by 86 runs
Arun Jaitley Cricket Stadium, New Delhi
Umpires: Jayaraman Madanagopal (Ind) and Virender Sharma (Ind)
Player of the match: Nitish Kumar Reddy (Ind)

- Bangladesh won the toss and elected to field.
- This was India's highest total against Bangladesh in T20Is.

=== 3rd T20I ===
12 October 2024
19:00 (N)
Scorecard

India; 297/6 (20 overs)	v	Bangladesh; 164/7 (20 overs)
Sanju Samson 111 (47); Tanzim Hasan Sakib 3/66 (4 overs)		Towhid Hridoy 63* (42); Ravi Bishnoi 3/30 (4 overs)

India won by 133 runs
Rajiv Gandhi International Cricket Stadium, Hyderabad
Umpires: K. N. Ananthapadmanabhan (Ind) and Rohan Pandit (Ind)
Player of the match: Sanju Samson (Ind)

- India won the toss and elected to bat.
- Mahmudullah (Ban) played in his last T20I.
- Sanju Samson (Ind) scored his first century in T20Is.
- This was India's highest total in T20Is, and the highest total by a full member-nation.
- Ravi Bishnoi (Ind) took his 50th wicket in T20Is.

== Statistics ==
=== Leading run-scorers (Tests) ===
Rank	Name	Runs	Matches	Innings	HS	Average	100s	50s
1	(India) Yashasvi Jaiswal	189	2	4	72	47.25	-	3
2	(India) Shubman Gill	164	2	4	119	54.67	1	1
3	(India) Rishabh Pant	161	2	4	109	53.67	1	1
4	(Bangladesh) Najmul Hossain Shanto	152	2	4	82	38	-	1
5	(Bangladesh) Mominul Haque	122	2	4	107	40.67	1	1

=== Leading wicket-takers (Tests) ===
Rank	Name	Wickets	Matches	Innings	Overs	Average	Best.
1	(India) Jasprit Bumrah	11	2	4	49.0	12.82	4/50
2	(India) Ravichandran Ashwin	11	2	4	64.0	19.27	6/88
3	(India) Ravindra Jadeja	9	2	4	42.3	15.44	3/34
4	(Bangladesh) Mehidy Hasan Miraz	9	2	4	61.4	29.44	4/41
5	(Bangladesh) Hasan Mahmud	6	2	4	39.2	32.00	5/83

=== Leading run-scorers (T20Is) ===
Rank	Name	Runs	Matches	Innings	HS	Average	100s	50s
1	(India) Sanju Samson	150	3	3	111	50.00	1	1
2	(India) Hardik Pandya	118	3	3	47	59.00	-	-
3	(India) Suryakumar Yadav	112	3	3	75	37.33	-	1
4	(India) Nitish Reddy	90	3	3	74	45	-	1
5	(Bangladesh) Towhid Hridoy	77	3	3	63	38.50	-	1

=== Leading wicket-takers (T20Is) ===
Rank	Name	Wickets	Matches	Overs	Average	Best.
1	(India) Varun Chakaravarthy	5	3	12.0	14.60	3/31
2	(Bangladesh) Tanzim Hasan Sakib	5	2	8.0	23.20	3/66
3	(India) Arshdeep Singh	4	2	6.5	10.00	3/14
4	(India) Mayank Yadav	4	3	12.0	20.75	2/32
5	(Bangladesh) Mustafizur Rahman	4	3	11.0	31.00	2/36
