= Awadhesh Pratap Singh University Stadium =

Stadium in Rewa, India

- Interactive map of Awadhesh Pratap Singh University Stadium
- Full name: Awadhesh Pratap Singh University Ground
- Location: Rewa, Madhya Pradesh
- Coordinates: 24.553°N 81.310°E
- Owner: Awadhesh Pratap Singh University
- Operator: Awadhesh Pratap Singh University
- Capacity: 5,000

Construction
- Groundbreaking: 1983
- Opened: 1983

Website
- ESPNcricinfo

Awadhesh Pratap Singh University Stadium is a multi purpose stadium in Rewa, Madhya Pradesh. The ground is mainly used for organizing matches of football, cricket and other sports. The stadium has hosted a Ranji Trophy match in 1970 when Madhya Pradesh cricket team played against Uttar Pradesh cricket team. but since then the stadium is regular of hosted non-first-class matches.
