= Daly College Ground =

Cricket ground

- Location: Indore, Madhya Pradesh
- Country: India
- Coordinates: 22.703°N 75.892°E
- Establishment: 1910
- Capacity: n/a
- Owner: Daly College
- Operator: Daly College
- Tenants: Madhya Pradesh cricket team

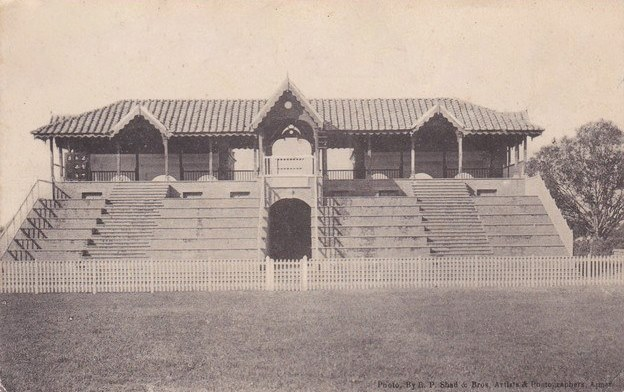
The Scindia Pavilion, Circa 1910s

The Daly College Ground also known as the Scindia cricket ground, is located at the Daly College in Indore, Madhya Pradesh. The Scindia Pavilion was donated by HH Maharaja Madho Rao Scindia of Gwalior State.

The ground has hosted five First-class cricket matches, when Holkar cricket team played against Madhya Pradesh cricket team beginning in 1955 through 2001.

The ground has hosted ten List A matches from 2002 to 2005. The first match was played between Uttar Pradesh cricket team and Railways cricket team in 2002. Since then the ground has hosted non-first-class matches.

== See also ==
- Yeshwant Club Ground
- Holkar Stadium
- Nehru Stadium
