= LCPE Ground =

Multi purpose stadium in Gwalior, Madhya Pradesh, India

Laxmibai College of Physical Education Ground
- LCPE Ground
- Interactive map of Laxmibai College of Physical Education Ground
- Full name: Laksmibai National College of Physical Education Ground
- Former names: Laxmibai College of Physical Education Ground
- Location: Gwalior, Madhya Pradesh
- Coordinates: 26.222°N 78.197°E
- Owner: Laksmibai National College of Physical Education
- Operator: Laksmibai National College of Physical Education

Construction
- Groundbreaking: 1940
- Opened: 1940

Website
- ESPNcricinfo

Laxmibai College of Physical Education Ground is a multi purpose stadium in Gwalior, Madhya Pradesh. The ground is mainly used for organizing matches of cricket, football and other sports. The stadium has facilities for various sports like cricket, football, hockey etc. There is also an astroturf field for hockey which is used for various hockey event. In addition to this there is a swimming pool and a Cycling Velodrome.

The stadium hosted two first-class matches in 1943 when Gwalior cricket team played against Delhi cricket team and again in 1970 when Madhya Pradesh cricket team played against Vidarbha cricket team.

The ground also hosted a List A match between Madhya Pradesh cricket team against Railways cricket team but since then the stadium has hosted non-first-class cricket matches.
