= Madhavsinh Jagdale =

Indian cricketer

Personal information
- Full name: Madhavsinh Madhavrao Jagdale
- Born: 25 April 1914; Baroda, Bombay Presidency
- Died: 13 January 1990 (aged 75); Bhopal, Madhya Pradesh
- Batting: Right-handed
- Bowling: Right-arm offbreak
- Role: All-rounder
- Relatives: Ashok Jagdale (son); Sanjay Jagdale (son)

Domestic team information
- Years: Team
- 1934/35-1935/36: Central India
- 1939/40: Hindus
- 1939/40: Baroda
- 1941/42-1957/58: Holkar

Career statistics
Competition	First-class
Matches	64
Runs scored	2,763
Batting average	29.70
100s/50s	2/18
Top score	164
Balls bowled	4,782
Wickets	72
Bowling average	25.77
5 wickets in innings	3
10 wickets in match	1
Best bowling	7/65
Catches/stumpings	18/–
- Source: CricketArchive, 18 May 2016

Madhavsinh Madhavrao Jagdale (25 April 1914 – 13 January 1990) was an Indian cricketer and a former member of the national Selection Committee. He played 64 first-class matches for Baroda, Central India, Holkar and Hindus in a career that lasted from the 1934–35 season to 1957–58. He scored 2,763 first-class runs with two centuries and 18 half-centuries. He also took 72 wickets with his bowling.

His sons Sanjay Jagdale and Ashok Jagdale played cricket for Madhya Pradesh cricket team. His son Sanjay is former Indian national team selector. Sanjay and Madhavsinh is only father-son pair that represent Indian cricket selectors but never represented India cricket team in International Cricket.
