= Yeshwant Club =

Coordinates: 22.724°N 75.877°E

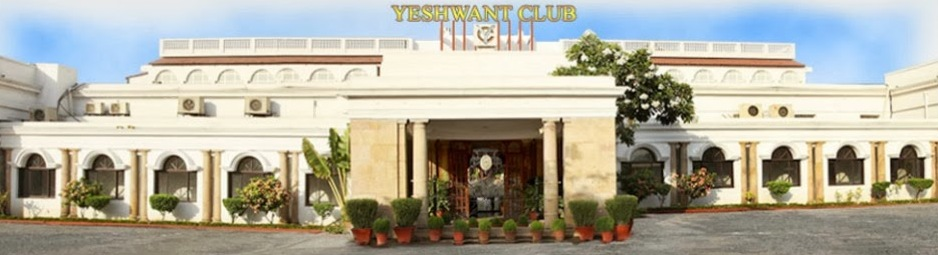
The Yeshwant Club, Indore, established in 1934.

The Yeshwant Club (द यशवंत क्लब) in Indore, Madhya Pradesh, India, came into existence in 1934 at the behest of Maharaja Sir Tukoji Rao III Holkar of Indore. The club was established out of affection for his son, Yuvraj Yeshwant Rao Holkar. Spread over an expanse of 14 acres, it is one of the living signatures of the rich legacy of the Holkar rulers of Indore State of the Maratha Confederacy. Initially the club was opened for royalty, nobility, aristocracy, and the officers (Indians and British) of the Holkar State. Later, its doors were opened for business elites. After Indian independence, admission criteria were revised.

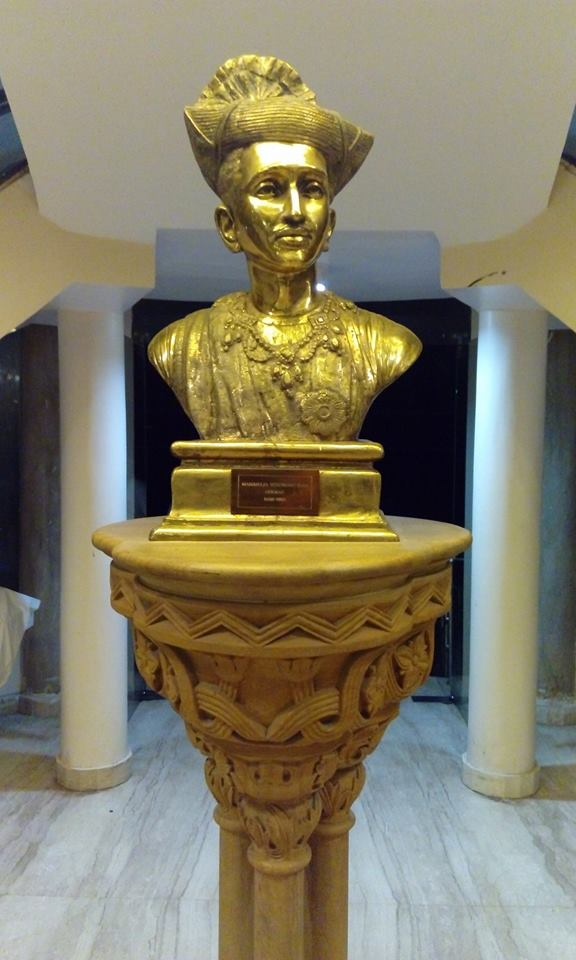
Bust of Major General Maharaja Shrimant Sir Yeshwant Rao II Holkar of Indore, kept at the Yeshwant Club, Indore.

Maharani Usha Devi, the daughter of Major General Maharaja Shrimant Sir Yeshwant Rao II Holkar of Indore, is the chief patron of the club, and the Honorary Chief Minister of Madhya Pradesh is the president of the club.

The club hosts musical nights, tambola evenings, sports tournaments, and exhibitions. There are facilities for indoor and outdoor games like tennis, squash, basketball, badminton, table tennis. The club maintains a cricket ground, football ground, modern gym and swimming pool. Coaching camps are organised during the summers.

Membership to the club is extremely difficult to get. The club has almost stopped granting new memberships due to a large member base. Memberships are bequeathed across generations by the members.

== See also ==
- Daly College Ground
- Rajwada
- Holkar State
