= Ratlam Railway Colony =

- city
- Location in Madhya Pradesh, India Ratlam Railway Colony (India)
- Coordinates: 23°20′29″N 75°2′44″E
- Country: India
- State: Madhya Pradesh
- District: Ratlam

Area
  - Total: 3 km^{2} (1.2 sq mi)

Population (2001)
  - Total: 12,213
  - Density: 4,100/km^{2} (11,000/sq mi)

Languages
  - Official: Hindi
- Time zone: UTC+5:30 (IST)
- 457001: 07412
- ISO 3166 code: IN-MP
- Vehicle registration: MP 43 7JMQ9336+35

Ratlam Railway Colony, also known as Ratlam Kasba, is a census town in Ratlam District in the Indian state of Madhya Pradesh.It stretches from Dat ki Pul to the Railway hospital. The colony ends at Gandhinagar and the railway station on the opposite side. It is home to two railway schools, a full-sized basketball court, a full-size track and field ground and a volleyball court. The colony boasts two clubs with badminton courts and pool table.

The majority of residents work in the D.R.M. office outside the colony.

== Demographics ==
As of 2001 India census, Ratlam Railway Colony had a population of 12,213. Males constituted 53% of the population and females 47%. Ratlam Railway Colony has an average literacy rate of 80%, higher than the national average of 59.5%: male literacy is 86%, and female literacy is 73%. In Ratlam Railway Colony, 10% of the population is under 6 years of age. Ratlam Railway colony is not a part of Ratlam NagarNigam because the maintenance of colony and road is done by the railway company.
