= Indian cricket team in Bangladesh in 2026 =

International cricket tour

Indian cricket team in Bangladesh in 2025
	Bangladesh	India
- Dates: 1 – 13 September 2026

One Day International series

Twenty20 International series

The India cricket team is scheduled to tour Bangladesh in September 2026 to play the Bangladesh cricket team. The tour will consist of three One Day International (ODI) and three Twenty20 Internationals (T20I) matches. This would be the first-ever bilateral T20I series between two sides held in Bangladesh. In January 2026, the Bangladesh Cricket Board (BCB) confirmed the fixtures for the tour, as a part of the 2026 home international season.

The series was scheduled to played in August 2025. However, in July 2025, the series was postponed to September 2026. In January 2026, BCB announced the new fixtures of the tour.

== ODI series ==
=== 1st ODI ===
TBD

Bangladesh	v	India

=== 2nd ODI ===
TBD

Bangladesh	v	India

=== 3rd ODI ===
TBD

Bangladesh	v	India

== T20I series ==
=== 1st T20I ===
TBD

Bangladesh	v	India

=== 2nd T20I ===
TBD

Bangladesh	v	India

=== 3rd T20I ===
TBD

Bangladesh	v	India
