= Indian cricket team in Bangladesh in 2004–05 =

India in Bangladesh 2004–05
	Bangladesh	India
- Dates: 10 December 2004 – 27 December 2004
Captains	Habibul Bashar	Sourav Ganguly

Test series
- Result: India won the 2-match series 2–0
Most runs	Mohammad Ashraful (221)	Sachin Tendulkar (284)
Most wickets	Mohammad Rafique (6)	Irfan Pathan (18)
- Player of the series: Irfan Pathan (Ind)

One Day International series
- Results: India won the 3-match series 2–1
Most runs	Aftab Ahmed (106)	Mohammad Kaif (158)
Most wickets	Khaled Mahmud (6)	Ajit Agarkar (6)
- Player of the series: Mohammad Kaif (Ind)

The Indian cricket team toured Bangladesh for two Tests and three One Day Internationals (ODIs) from 10 to 27 December 2004. India won the Test series 2-0 and the ODI series 2–1.

== Test matches ==
=== 1st Test ===
10–13 December 2004
Scorecard

Bangladesh	v	India
184 (57.5 overs); Mohammad Ashraful 60 (135); Irfan Pathan 5/45 (16 overs)		526 (136.4 overs); Sachin Tendulkar 248*(379); Mushfiqur Rahman 2/104 (24 overs)
202 (53.2 overs); Manjural Islam 69 (116); Irfan Pathan 6/51 (15 overs)

India won by an innings and 140 runs
Bangabandhu National Stadium, Dhaka
Umpires: Aleem Dar (Pak) and Jeremy Lloyds (Eng)
Player of the match: Irfan Pathan (Ind)

- India won the toss and elected to field.

=== 2nd Test ===
17–20 December 2004
Scorecard

India	v	Bangladesh
540 (148.2 overs); Rahul Dravid 160 (304); Mohammad Rafique 4/156 (50 overs)		333 (91 overs); Mohammad Ashraful 158* (194); Anil Kumble 4/55 (26 overs)
		124 (26.4 overs); Talha Jubair 31 (24); Irfan Pathan 5/32 (9 overs)

India won by an innings and 83 runs
MA Aziz Stadium, Chittagong
Umpires: Aleem Dar (Pak) and Mark Benson (Eng)
Player of the match: Mohammad Ashraful (Ban)

- India won the toss and elected to bat.
- Nazmul Hossain (Ban) made his Test debut.

== ODI series ==
=== 1st ODI ===
23 December 2004
Scorecard

India; 245/8 (50 overs)	v	Bangladesh; 234/8 (50 overs)
Mohammad Kaif 80 (111); Nazmul Hossain 2/39 (9 overs)		Habibul Bashar 65 (96); Sridharan Sriram 3/43 (9 overs)

India won by 11 runs
MA Aziz Stadium, Chittagong
Umpires: Aleem Dar (Pak) and Mahbubur Rahman (Ban)
Player of the match: Mohammad Kaif (Ind)

- Bangladesh won the toss and elected to field
- MS Dhoni and Joginder Sharma (Ind) both made their ODI debuts.

=== 2nd ODI ===
26 December 2004
Scorecard

Bangladesh; 229/9 (50 overs)	v	India; 214 (47.5 overs)
Aftab Ahmed 67 (98); Ajit Agarkar 2/31 (9 overs)		Sridharan Sriram 57 (91); Tapash Baisya 2/35 (10 overs)

Bangladesh won by 15 runs
Bangabandhu National Stadium, Dhaka
Umpires: Aleem Dar (Pak) and AFM Akhtaruddin (Ban)
Player of the match: Mashrafe Mortaza (Ban)

- Bangladesh won the toss and elected to bat.
- This was also Bangladesh's 1st ODI win at home, and also, Bangladesh's first win against India in any format.

=== 3rd ODI ===
27 December 2004
Scorecard

India; 348/5 (50 overs)	v	Bangladesh; 257/9 (50 overs)
Virender Sehwag 70 (52); Khaled Mahmud 3/62 (10 overs)		Rajin Saleh 82 (114); Sachin Tendulkar 4/54 (9 overs)

India won by 91 runs
Bangabandhu National Stadium, Dhaka
Umpires: Aleem Dar (Pak) and Mahbubur Rahman (Ban)
Player of the match: Virender Sehwag (Ind)

- India won the toss and elected to bat
