= Sanjay Jagdale =

Former Indian cricketer and former member of the Selection Committee

Sanjay Madansingh Jagdale
Personal information
- Full name: Sanjay Madansingh Jagdale
- Born: 22 September 1950 (age 76); Indore, Madhya Pradesh, India
- Batting: Right-handed
- Bowling: Right-arm off break
- Role: All-rounder
- Relatives: Madhavsinh Jagdale (father); Ashok Jagdale (brother)

Domestic team information
- Years: Team
- 1968/69–1982/83: Madhya Pradesh

Career statistics
Competition	First-class	List A
Matches	53	1
Runs scored	2,077	–
Batting average	26.62	–
100s/50s	2/9	–
Top score	129	–
Balls bowled	6,836	–
Wickets	85	–
Bowling average	35.82	–
5 wickets in innings	1	–
10 wickets in match	0	–
Best bowling	6/132	–
Catches/stumpings	5/–	0/–
- Source: CricketArchive, 18 May 2016

Sanjay Madansingh Jagdale (born 22 September 1950) is a former Indian cricketer and a former member of the Selection Committee. He was born at Indore in Madhya Pradesh.

He is the son of former Indian national team selector Madhavsinh Jagdale. Sanjay Jagdale and Madhavsinh Jagdale represent the only father-son pair of Indian cricket selectors never to represent India in International Cricket. Sanjay represented Madhya Pradesh in Indian domestic cricket. He was appointed the new secretary of BCCI in August 2011 and on 31 May 2013 he resigned his post along with Ajay Shirke following corruption in the Indian Premier League.

== National selector ==
After retiring from domestic cricket in 1983, Sanjay Jagdale returned to the game as a cricket administrator. Although a cricketer with moderate record, Sanjay Jagdale excelled in identifying talent. Narendra Hirwani - an ex Indian Test cricketer considers Sanjay Jagdale as his mentor and guru and as part of the junior selection committee in the early 1990s, he spotted talents like VVS Laxman, Murali Karthik, Hrishikesh Kanitkar, Sridharan Sriram, Naman Ojha and Vipin Acharya.

Sanjay served on the Senior selection committee (representing Central Zone) on various occasions:

- October 2000 - September 2004: Member, Selection Committee under Chandu Borde (2000 and 2001), Brijesh Patel (2002), Syed Kirmani (2003)
- November 2005 to present: Member, Selection Committee under Kiran More (2005), Dilip Vengsarkar (2006 -).

In January 2007, Sanjay Jagdale was entrusted with the additional responsibility of Manager for India's campaign in the 2007 World Cup. He had earlier been India's manager during the 2005 tour to Sri Lanka.

== Controversies ==
=== Kale's Bribery Charges ===
In November 2003, Abhijit Kale who represented India in a single One Day International match was accused by the then BCCI's joint secretary Ratnakar Shetty of attempting to bribe two members of the selection committee - Kiran More and Pranab Roy. Abhijit Kale was suspended immediately from playing international or domestic cricket and was subject to an inquiry commission (November 2003) and disciplinary committee hearing in May 2004. The commission headed by D.V. Subba Rao heard the testimony of Kale and Sanjay Jagdale who testified for the selection committee and submitted its report in December 2003. After the disciplinary hearings, Kale is believed to have sent an apology letter to the then BCCI president Jagmohan Dalmiya. On 2 June 2004, Abhijit Kale was banned from playing domestic cricket until 31 December 2004.
