= Nehru Stadium, Indore =

Cricket stadium in Indore, Madhya Pradesh

Coordinates: 22°42′33″N 75°52′53″E

Jawaharlal Nehru Stadium
- Nehru Stadium
- Interactive map of Jawaharlal Nehru Stadium

Ground information
- Location: Indore, Madhya Pradesh, India
- Country: India
- Establishment: 1964
- Capacity: 25,000
- Owner: Indore Municipal Corporation
- Operator: Indore Municipal Corporation
- Tenants: n/a
- Last used: 2001
- End names
- n/a

International information
- First ODI: 1 December, 1983: India v West Indies
- Last ODI: 31 March, 2001: India v Australia
- First WODI: 21 February 1985: India v New Zealand
- Last WODI: 17 December 1997: India v New Zealand
- As of 9 December 2019; Source: Nehru Stadium, ESPNcricinfo

Jawaharlal Nehru Stadium located in Indore, India, is a multi-purpose stadium used for cricket, football, Kho Kho, and basketball with a capacity for 25,000 people. Nehru Stadium was planned during the mayoral tenure of Narayan Prasad Shukla, who played a key role in initiating major sports infrastructure projects in Indore.

However, all the international as well as national cricket matches take place at the "Holkar Stadium which is situated at Race Course Road, Indore and a plethora of different sports activities take place at the Nehru Stadium which also partly serves as the Headquarters of the Air-Force wing of the Western Command of the National Cadet Corps (India).

Nehru Stadium sports a statue of Col. C.K. Nayudu, Indore's favourite son of that era, outside its main entrance as a concession to tradition.

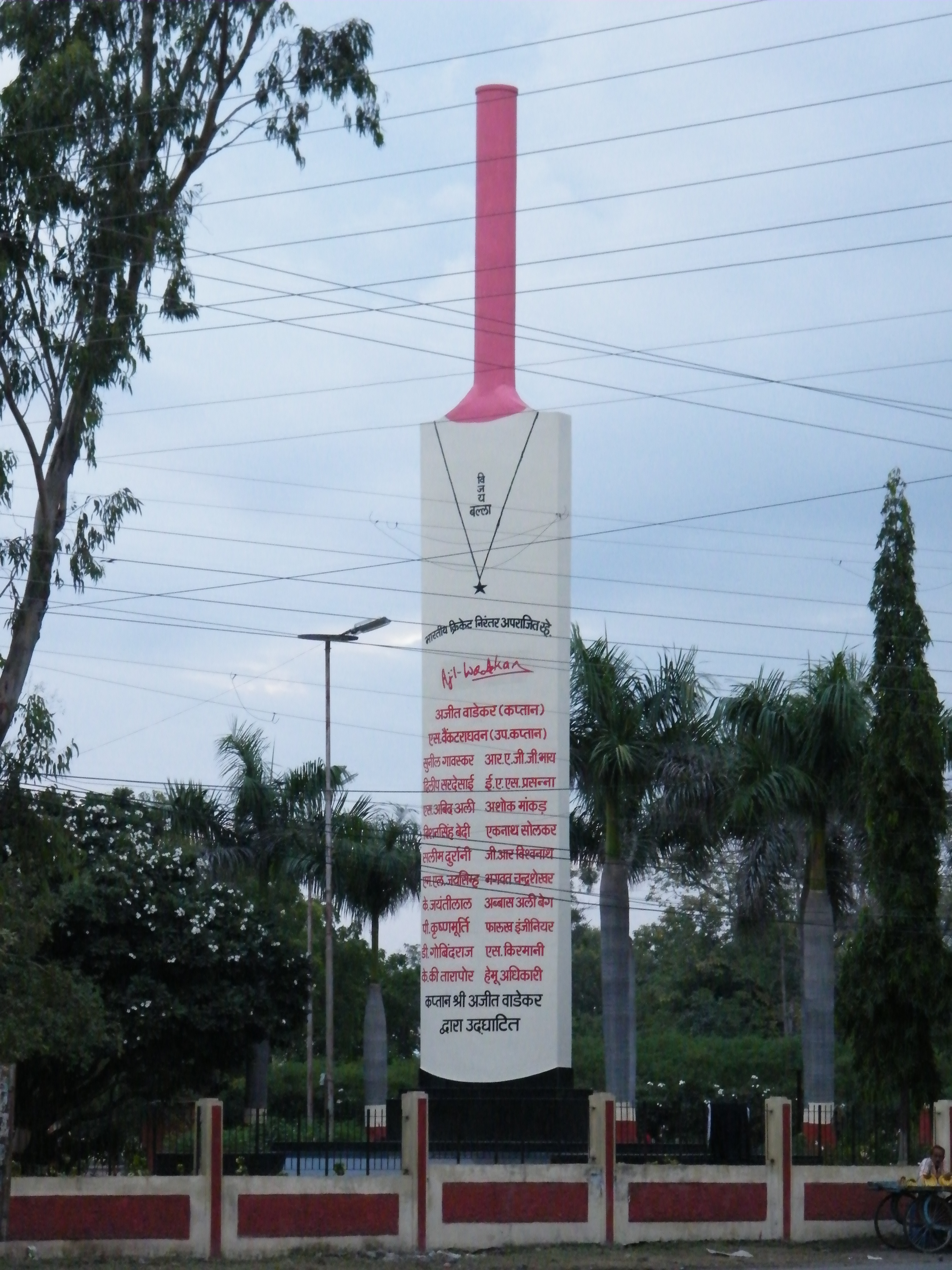
The Vijay Balla ("Victory Bat") made out of concrete with names of the players of the Indian team who won the test series in England (1971) and West Indies (1972)

As of 19 August 2017, it has hosted 9 One Day Internationals (ODIs).

== History ==
The Stadium attained infamy when an ODI match between India and Sri Lanka on 25 December 1997 was abandoned after the third over of the first innings due to the captains and umpires agreeing that the pitch was too dangerous, to which the match referee concurred. A 25-over exhibition match was held on an adjoining pitch to placate the sell-out crowd of 25,000.

The stadium was subsequently suspended by the ICC from holding matches for two years.

The Stadium hosted its last ODI match on 31 March 2001, where Sachin Tendulkar created history by becoming the first player to reach 10,000 runs in ODI cricket.

Holkar Stadium in the same city hosted the last ODI match between India and Australia in September 2017. As of 2020, it is unknown if Nehru Stadium will host another international match.

In July 2023, it was announced that a modern sports complex would replace the stadium. The new complex, costing around INR 300 crore, will offer a comprehensive range of outdoor and indoor sports facilities. The decision to replace the stadium comes due to its deteriorating condition.

== One Day International cricket ==
The stadium has hosted following ODI matches till date.

Team (A)	Team (B)	Winner	Margin	Year
India	West Indies	West Indies	By 8 wickets	1983
India	Australia	Australia	By 6 wickets	1984
India	Pakistan	Pakistan	By 3 wickets	1987
Australia	New Zealand	Australia	By 6 wickets	1987
India	New Zealand	India	By 53 Runs	1988
India	Zimbabwe	Tied		1993
Australia	South Africa	South Africa	By 7 wickets	1996
India	Sri Lanka	No result		1997
India	Australia	India	By 118 runs	2001

== Records ==
The highest score by a team is Indian national cricket team against Australia national cricket team- 299/8 on 31 Mar 2001. The lowest team score is by Sri Lanka national cricket team against Indian national cricket team- 17/1. The leading run scorers in the stadium were Ravi Shastri - 193 runs, Sachin Tendulkar- 163 runs and Gary Kirsten- 105 runs. The leading wicket takers here is Srikanth- 5 wickets.

== List of Centuries ==
=== Key ===
- * denotes that the batsman was not out.
- Inns. denotes the number of the innings in the match.
- Balls denotes the number of balls faced in an innings.
- NR denotes that the number of balls was not recorded.
- Parentheses next to the player's score denotes his century number at Edgbaston.
- The column title Date refers to the date the match started.
- The column title Result refers to the player's team result

=== One Day Internationals ===
No.	Score	Player	Team	Balls	Inns.	Opposing team	Date	Result
1	102	Ravi Shastri	India	141	1	Australia	6 October 1984	Lost
2	105*	Gary Kirsten	South Africa	134	2	Australia	19 October 1996	Won
3	139	Sachin Tendulkar	India	125	1	Australia	31 March 2001	Won

== List of Five Wicket Hauls ==
=== Key ===
Symbol	Meaning
†	The bowler was man of the match
‡	10 or more wickets taken in the match
§	One of two five-wicket hauls by the bowler in the match
Date	Day the Test started or ODI was held
Inn	Innings in which five-wicket haul was taken
Overs	Number of overs bowled.
Runs	Number of runs conceded
Wkts	Number of wickets taken
Econ	Runs conceded per over
Batsmen	Batsmen whose wickets were taken
Drawn	The match was drawn.

=== One Day Internationals ===
No.	Bowler	Date	Team	Opposing team	Inn	Overs	Runs	Wkts	Econ	Batsmen	Result
1	Krishnamachari Srikkanth	15 December 1988	India	New Zealand	2	6	32	5	5.33	Tony Blain; John Bracewell; Evan Gray; Martin Snedden; Mark Greatbatch	Won

== See also ==
- Yeshwant Club, Indore
- Daly College, Indore
- Daly College Ground, Indore
- Yeshwant Club Ground, Indore
