= Ashok Jagdale =

Indian cricketer (1945–2022)

Personal information
- Full name: Ashok Madansingh Jagdale
- Born: 20 November 1945; Indore, Indore State, British India
- Died: 25 July 2022 (aged 76); Indore, Madhya Pradesh, India
- Batting: Right-handed
- Bowling: Right-arm medium-fast
- Role: All-rounder
- Relatives: Madhavsinh Jagdale (father); Sanjay Jagdale (brother)

Domestic team information
- Years: Team
- 1961/62–1979/80: Madhya Pradesh
- Source: CricketArchive, 18 May 2016

Ashok Madansingh Jagdale (20 November 1945 – 25 July 2022) was an Indian cricketer who played for Madhya Pradesh. He was a right-hand batsman who bowled right-arm medium-fast. He was the son of Madhavsinh Jagdale and elder brother of Sanjay Jagdale.
