= Khandu Rangnekar =

Indian cricketer

Personal information
- Full name: Khanderao Moreshwar Rangnekar
- Born: 27 June 1917; Bombay, Bombay Presidency, British India
- Died: 11 October 1984 (aged 67); Thane, Maharashtra, India
- Batting: Left-handed
- Bowling: Right-arm medium pace

International information
- National side: India
- Test debut (cap 39): 28 November 1947 v Australia
- Last Test: 23 January 1948 v Australia

Career statistics
Competition	Tests	First-class
Matches	3	85
Runs scored	33	4,602
Batting average	5.50	41.83
100s/50s	0/0	15/16
Top score	18	217
Balls bowled	–	1,680
Wickets	–	21
Bowling average	–	40.95
5 wickets in innings	–	1
10 wickets in match	–	0
Best bowling	–	5/112
Catches/stumpings	1	42
- Source: ESPNcricinfo

Khanderao Moreshwar 'Khandu' Rangnekar (27 June 1917, in Bombay – 11 October 1984, in Thane, Maharashtra) was an Indian Test cricketer. Rangnekar was an attacking batsman who was considered the best Indian left-hander of his time. He was a good fielder at cover-point and could field with either hand.

Rangnekar started his first class career in the Bombay Pentangular and scored a hundred in his first appearance in the Ranji Trophy. He played in three Test matches against Australia in 1947–48 without much success. During the tour Rangnekar was the only Indian player to publicly criticise the White Australia Policy and the resulting ban on non-white immigration.

Rangnekar was educated in the Byramji Jeejeebhoy School, St. Xaviers, and did his B.A. at Elphinstone College. Between 1939 and 1945 he was one of the best badminton players in India, winning the doubles title at the Indian National Badminton Championship in 1945. He won Western India doubles in 1940, 1942, and 1944 and mixed doubles in 1940. He was the Thane municipality president in the 1960s.

He was the vice president of BCCI from 1962–63 to 1969–70, president of Bombay Cricket Association in 1962–63 and the vice president between 1962–63 and 1978–79.

He worked in the Indian Customs in Bombay and ran a textile store business. Rangnekar died of throat cancer.

== Sources ==
- Bonnell, M & Sproul, A. (2022) Black Swan Summer, Pitch Publishing: Chichester, UK. ISBN 9781801502054
- Obituary in Indian Cricket 1985
- Christopher Martin-Jenkins, The Complete Who's Who of Test Cricketers
