= Jai Prakash Yadav (cricketer) =

Indian cricketer (born 1974)

Personal information
- Full name: Jai Prakash Yadav
- Born: 7 August 1974 (age 52); Bhopal, Madhya Pradesh, India
- Height: 5 ft 10 in (1.78 m)
- Batting: Right-handed
- Bowling: Right-arm medium
- Role: All-rounder

International information
- National side: India (2002 - 2005)
- ODI debut (cap 146): 6 November, 2002 v West Indies
- Last ODI: 5 November, 2005 v Sri Lanka
- ODI shirt no.: 69

Domestic team information
- Years: Team
- 1994–2013: Madhya Pradesh
- 2000–2010: Railways
- 2006/08: Delhi Giants

Career statistics
Competition	ODI	FC	LA	T20
Matches	12	130	134	12
Runs scored	81	7,334	3,620	107
Batting average	20.25	36.85	32.61	15.28
100s/50s	0/1	13/36	4/23	0/0
Top score	69	265	128	33
Balls bowled	396	18,819	5638	264
Wickets	6	296	135	12
Bowling average	54.33	23.13	29.32	26.83
5 wickets in innings	0	18	1	0
10 wickets in match	0	2	0	0
Best bowling	3/32	8/80	5/49	3/21
Catches/stumpings	3/–	84/–	46/–	3/–
Medal record
Men's Cricket
Representing India
ICC Champions Trophy
Winner	2002 Sri Lanka
- Source: ESPNcricinfo, 13 August 2014

Jai Prakash Yadav (born 7 August 1974) is an Indian Former International cricketer. He is a right-handed batsman and a right-arm medium-pace bowler. Yadav was a member of the Indian team that was one of the joint-winners of the 2002 ICC Champions Trophy, which the title was also shared with Sri Lanka.
