= Captain Roop Singh Stadium =

Cricket ground in Gwalior, India

Coordinates: 26.2107°N 78.1836°E

Captain Roop Singh International Cricket Stadium
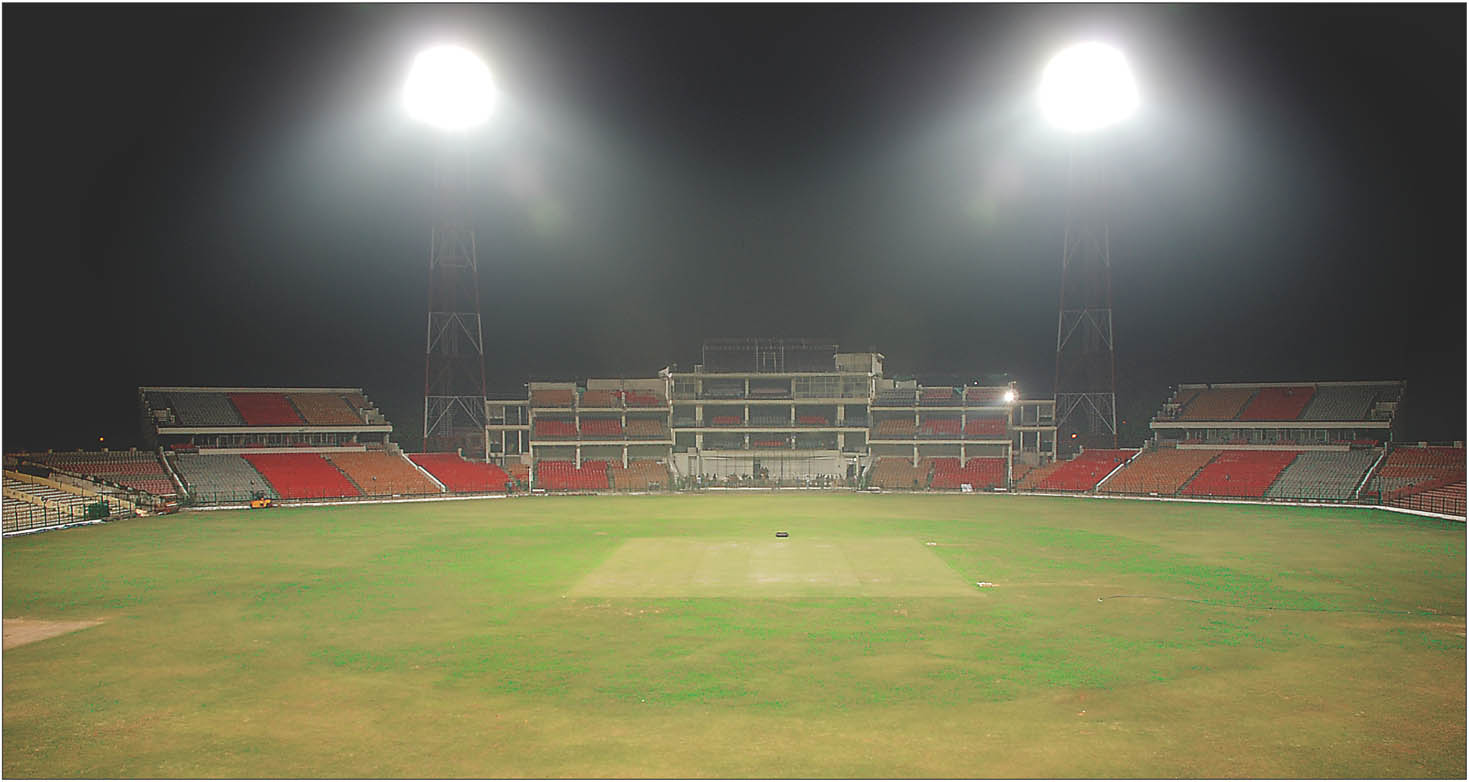
- Captain Roop Singh Stadium
- Interactive map of Captain Roop Singh International Cricket Stadium

Ground information
- Location: Gwalior, Madhya Pradesh
- Country: India
- Establishment: 1978
- Capacity: 18,000
- Owner: Madhya Pradesh Cricket Association
- Operator: Gwalior Division Cricket Association
- Tenants: Madhya Pradesh cricket team
- End names
- Railway end Pavilion end

International information
- First ODI: 21 January 1988: India v West Indies
- Last ODI: 24 February 2010: India v South Africa
- As of 12 August 2024; Source: Captain Roop Singh Stadium, ESPNcricinfo

Captain Roop Singh Stadium, is an international cricket stadium in Gwalior, India. The stadium has hosted 12 ODI matches, the first one was played between India and West Indies on 22 January 1988.

The ground has flood lights and has hosted day-night encounters. It can hold 18,000 people. It was originally a hockey stadium named after great Indian hockey player Roop Singh.

== Ground profile ==
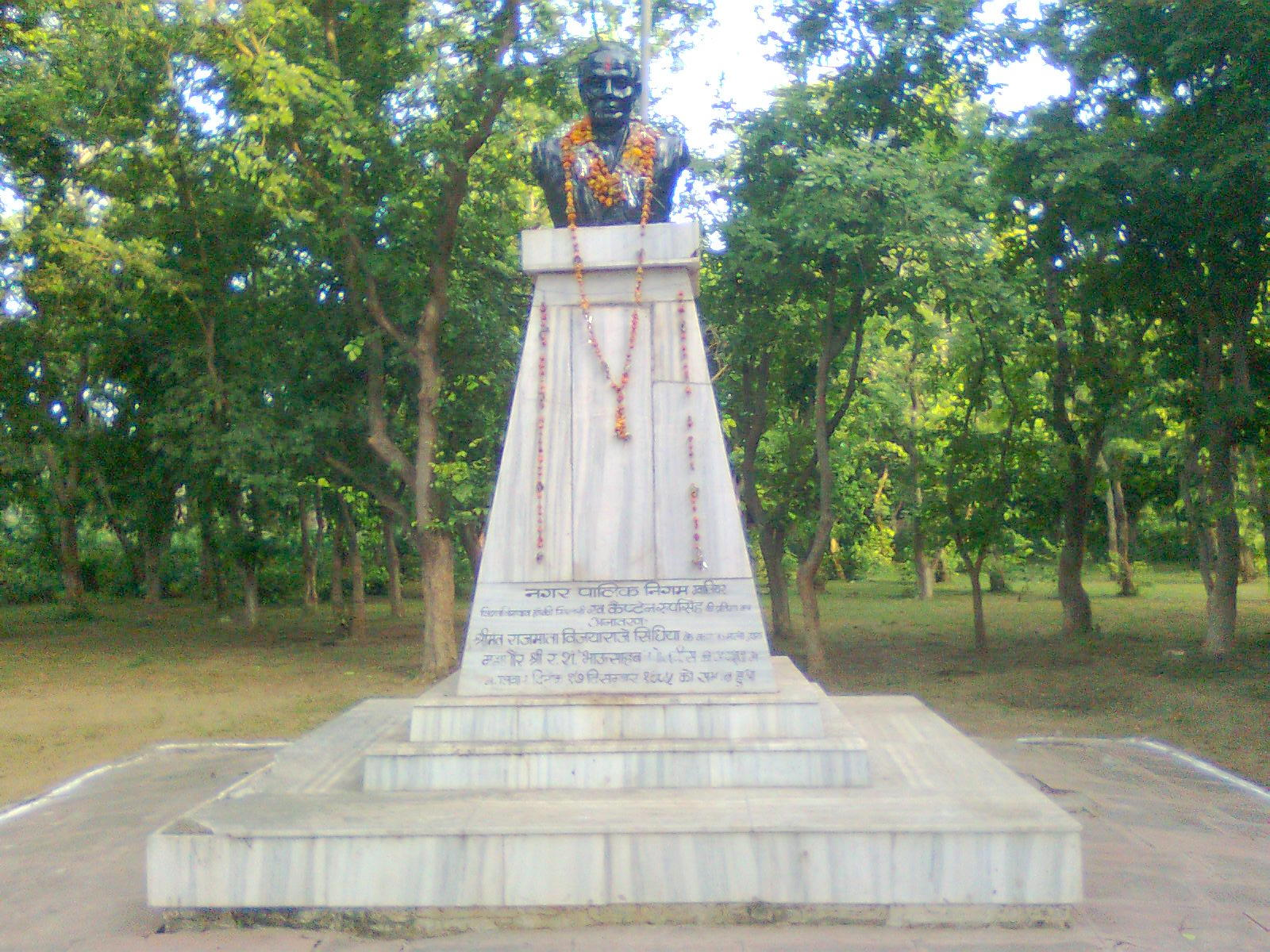
Captain Roop Singh Statue at Stadium

The stadium's first one-day international was held in 1988, when West Indies beat India by 73 runs, a match in which Narendra Hirwani made his one-day debut. Floodlights were installed in preparation for the 1996 Cricket World Cup fixture, also between India and West Indies. The stadium was also the venue for the first and only day-night Ranji Trophy final in 1996. The match was played between Mumbai and Delhi over five days and Mumbai won on the basis of a first-innings lead.

The pitch at the Captain Roop Singh Stadium has traditionally favoured the batsmen. In eight of the 10 ODIs, the team batting first has scored over 250. It has also been very lucky for most of the cricketers from India in India, especially Sachin Ramesh Tendulkar.

A pavilion at the Captain Roop Singh Stadium is named after Sachin Tendulkar who made the history by becoming the first cricketer to score a double century in an ODI.

== Matches hosted ==
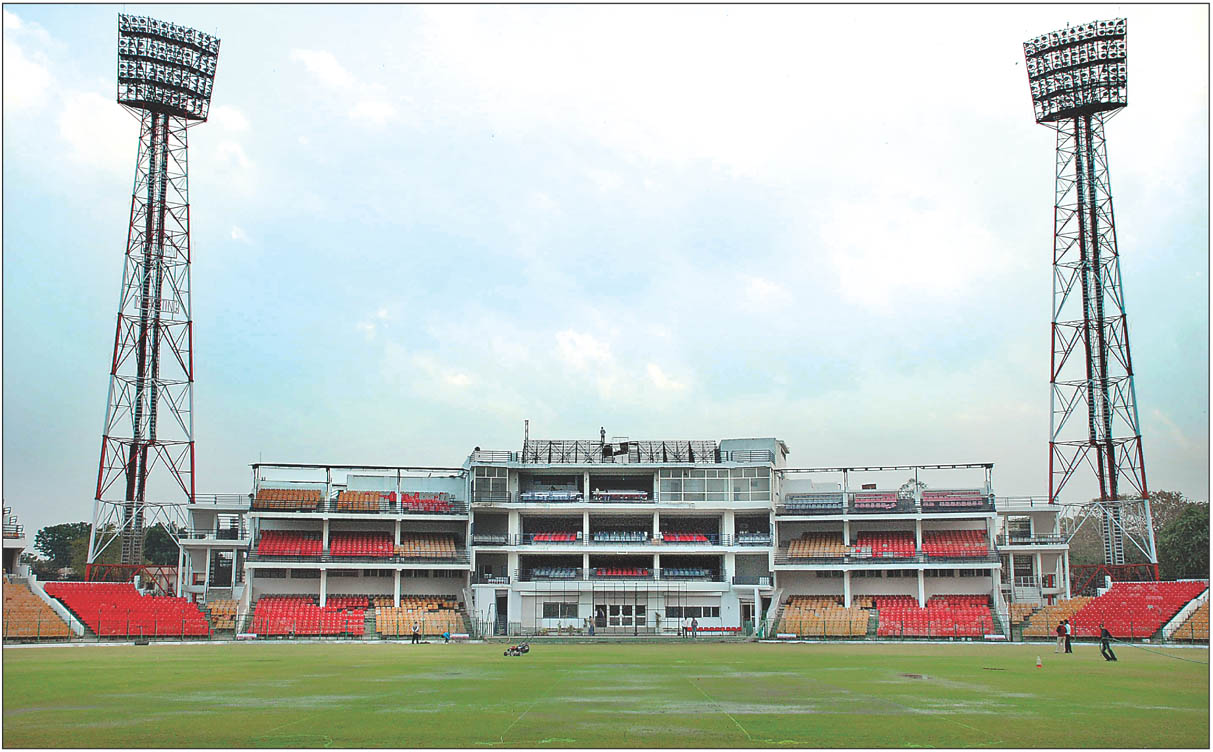
Pavilion End

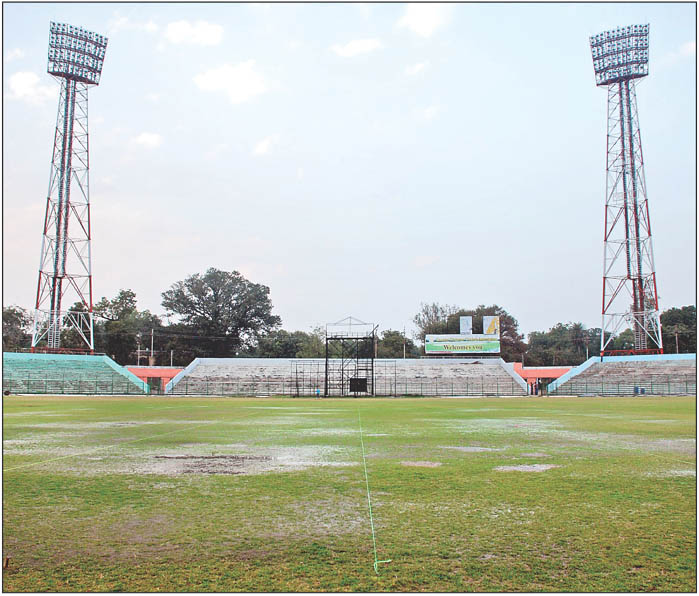
Railway End

One Match of the 1996 Cricket World Cup was also played on this ground between India and West Indies.

In May 1998, Kenya beat India by 69 runs in ODI for first time. As Kenya sailed confidently into the final of Coca-Cola Triangular Series.

It was their fifth win at this level, and their second over a Test nation. Ravindu Shah notching his third fifty in only his fourth one-day international, dominated the first phase of the innings. When he fell for 70 including 50 in boundaries, the score was 93. For once, Kenya built on their sound start.

Maurice Odumbe peppered his 91-ball 83 with five sixes, while Hitesh Modi contributed a run-a-ball fifty. In India's reply, eight batsmen made it to double figures, but none beyond 33. Maurice Odumbe followed his biggest score in one-day internationals with his best bowling, taking three for 14 with his off-spin.

In February 2010, in a match between India and South Africa where India scored 401/3 and Sachin Tendulkar became the first male cricketer ever to score a double century in an ODI ending on 200 not out. This match was comfortably won by India by 153 runs, where South Africa was bowled out for 248 in 42.5 Overs.

== Cricket World Cups ==
This stadium has hosted One Day International (ODI) match for 1996 Cricket World Cup, when India was a host/co-host.

ICC World Cup 1996, 5th Match, Group B

21 February
Scorecard

West Indies; 173 (50 overs)	v	India; 174/5 (39.4 overs)
Richie Richardson 47 (70); Anil Kumble 3/35 (10 overs)		Sachin Tendulkar 70 (91); Roger Harper 2/34 (9 overs)

India won by 5 wickets
Captain Roop Singh Stadium, Gwalior
Umpires: Khizer Hayat and Ian Robinson
Player of the match: Sachin Tendulkar (Ind)

== List of Centuries ==
=== Key ===
- * denotes that the batsman was not out.
- Inns. denotes the number of the innings in the match.
- Balls denotes the number of balls faced in an innings.
- NR denotes that the number of balls was not recorded.
- Parentheses next to the player's score denotes his century number at Edgbaston.
- The column title Date refers to the date the match started.
- The column title Result refers to the player's team result

=== One Day Internationals ===
No.	Score	Player	Team	Balls	Inns.	Opposing team	Date	Result
1	113*	Carl Hooper	West Indies	97	1	India	22 January 1988	Won
2	138*	Desmond Haynes	West Indies	164	1	England	27 October 1989	Won
3	129	Robin Smith	England	145	1	India	4 March 1993	Lost
4	134*	Navjot Singh Sidhu	India	160	2	England	4 March 1993	Won
5	105*	Graeme Hick	England	109	1	India	5 March 1993	Lost
6	153*	Sourav Ganguly	India	150	1	New Zealand	11 November 1999	Won
7	100	Sachin Tendulkar	India	119	1	Australia	26 October 2003	Won
8	102	VVS Laxman	India	134	1	Australia	26 October 2003	Won
9	200*	Sachin Tendulkar	India	147	1	South Africa	24 February 2010	Won
10	114*	A. B. de Villiers	South Africa	101	2	India	24 February 2010	Lost

== International cricket five-wicket hauls ==
=== ODIs ===
Five-wicket hauls in ODI matches at Captain Roop Singh Stadium
No.	Bowler	Date	Team	Opponent	Inn	Overs	Runs	Wkts	Econ	Batsmen	Result
1	Aaqib Javed	12 May 1997	Pakistan	Sri Lanka	2	10	35	5	3.50	Sanath Jayasuriya; Marvan Atapattu; Romesh Kaluwitharana; Aravinda de Silva; Chaminda Vaas	Pakistan won

== See also ==
- Madhya Pradesh cricket team
- Holkar Cricket Stadium
