= Amay Khurasiya =

Indian cricketer

Personal information
- Full name: Amay Ramsevak Khurasiya
- Born: 18 May 1972 (age 54); Jabalpur, Madhya Pradesh, India
- Batting: Left-handed
- Bowling: Left-arm orthodox spin
- Role: Batsman

International information
- National side: India
- ODI debut (cap 121): 30 March 1999 v Sri Lanka
- Last ODI: 15 November 2001 v Sri Lanka

Domestic team information
- Years: Team
- 1989–2006: Madhya Pradesh

Career statistics
Competition	ODI	FC	LA
Matches	12	119	112
Runs scored	149	7,304	3,768
Batting average	13.54	40.80	38.06
100s/50s	0/1	21/31	4/26
Top score	57	238	157
Balls bowled	–	6	6
Wickets	–	0	0
Bowling average	–	–	–
5 wickets in innings	–	–	–
10 wickets in match	–	–	–
Best bowling	–	–	–
Catches/stumpings	3/–	90/–	44/–
- Source: ESPNcricinfo, 11 September 2024

Amay Khurasiya (born 18 May 1972) is a former Indian cricketer. He played as a left-handed batsman and a slow left-arm bowler. Currently, he is the Kerala cricket team coach.

== Career ==
Khurasiya has the rare distinction of clearing the Civil Services Examination before he made his debut for India. As of today he is an Inspector in Indian Customs & Central Excise Department.

His first class career stretches back to 1989/90, and includes seventeen consecutive seasons (1990–91 to 2005–06). He made his ODI debut with a brisk 57 off 45 balls against Sri Lanka at Pune in the Pepsi Cup tri-nations tournament in 1999 which also involved Pakistan. He played 10 of his 12 ODIs in 1999.

He was included in the 1999 Indian World Cup squad, but didn't get a chance to play in any match in the tournament.

In 2001, he made a comeback into ODIs by playing two more matches against Sri Lanka in a tri-series without much success. He never played for India again.

== Retirement ==
Khurasiya announced his retirement from first class cricket on 22 April 2007 after he was dropped from Madhya Pradesh Ranji team. He told reporters he would continue to serve the game through coaching. He is the level three coach of Madhya Pradesh.
