= Madhya Pradesh cricket team =

Indian cricket team

- MP cricket team
- Nickname: MP

Personnel
- Captain: Rajat Patidar (FC & T20); Venkatesh Iyer (LA)
- Coach: Chandrakant Pandit
- Chairman: Jyotiraditya Scindia
- Owner: Madhya Pradesh Cricket Association

Team information
- Founded: 1934
- Home ground: Holkar Stadium
- Capacity: 30,000
- Secondary home ground: Captain Roop Singh Stadium
- Secondary ground capacity: 18,000

History
- First-class debut: Central Provinces and Berar (now Vidarbha) in 1934 at Madhya Pradesh Cricket Association Ground, Nagpur
- Ranji Trophy wins: 5
- Wills Trophy wins: 1
- Vijay Hazare Trophy wins: 0
- Syed Mushtaq Ali Trophy wins: 0
- Official website: MPCA Official

The Madhya Pradesh cricket team formerly known as Holkar cricket team, is a domestic cricket team based in the Indian state of Madhya Pradesh. It competes in the Ranji Trophy.

== History ==
=== Holkar cricket team ===
A Central India team competed in the Ranji Trophy between 1934–35 and 1939–40, playing 12 matches. In 1941, Holkar entered the competition, organised and managed by King Yashwantrao Holkar II belonging to the Holkar dynasty of the Marathas. In the fourteen years of its existence Holkar, which included such players as C. K. Nayudu and Mushtaq Ali, won the title four times and finished second on six other occasions. Another Ranji Trophy team later to be absorbed by Madhya Pradesh was Gwalior (one match in 1943–44).

=== Madhya Pradesh team ===
Madhya Pradesh began competing as a team from 1950–51. Holkar appeared in the Ranji Trophy till 1954-55 after which it was dissolved and replaced by a Madhya Bharat team. This became part of the Madhya Pradesh team after two years as the states were reorganised.

Madhya Pradesh's first title was the 1998-99 Wills Trophy, where they defeated Bengal in the final. Madhya Pradesh team reached the final of the Ranji Trophy for the first time in the same season. They took the first innings lead against Karnataka and needed only a draw to win the title but collapsed in the final session of the last day to lose with five overs to spare.

Finally in the 2021–22 season, Madhya Pradesh defeated the 41-time Champions Mumbai in the final in Bengaluru to win the Ranji Trophy for the fifth time and first time as Madhya Pradesh.

== Honours ==
Holkar

- Ranji Trophy
  - Winners (4): 1945–46, 1947–48, 1950–51, 1952–53
  - Runners-up (6): 1944–45, 1946–47, 1949–50, 1951–52, 1953–54, 1954–55

Madhya Pradesh

- Ranji Trophy
  - Winners: 2021–22
  - Runners-up: 1998–99
- Wills Trophy
  - Winners: 1998–99
- Syed Mushtaq Ali Trophy
  - Runners-up (2): 2010-11, 2024-25

== Famous players ==
Players from Holkar and Madhya Pradesh who have played Test cricket for India, along with year of Test debut:

- Cottari Kanakaiya Nayudu (1932)
- Janardan Navle (1932)
- Cottari Subbanna Nayudu (1934)
- Syed Mushtaq Ali (1934)
- Chandu Sarwate (1946)
- Hiralal Gaekwad (1952)
- Narendra Hirwani (1988)
- Rajesh Chauhan (1993)
- Naman Ojha (2015)
- Rajat Patidar (2024)

Players from Madhya Pradesh who have played ODI but not Test cricket for India, along with year of ODI debut:

- Amay Khurasiya (1999)
- Venkatesh Iyer (2022)
- Avesh Khan (2022)
- Kuldeep Sen (2022)

Cricketers from other state teams who also played for Madhya Pradesh, and played Test cricket for India, along with year of Test debut:

- Khanderao Rangnekar (1947)
- Chandrakant Pandit (1986)

Cricketers from other state teams who also played for Madhya Pradesh, and played ODI but not Test cricket for India, along with year of ODI debut:

- Jai Prakash Yadav (2002)

Notable players at the domestic level:

- Bhausaheb Nimbalkar
- Narayan Nivsarkar
- Devendra Bundela
- Ishwar Pandey
- Jalaj Saxena

== Current squad ==
Players with international caps are listed in bold.

Name	Birth date	Batting style	Bowling style	Notes
Batsmen
Yash Dubey	23 December 1998 (age 27)	Right-handed		
**Rajat Patidar**	1 June 1993 (age 33)	Right-handed	Right-arm off break	**First-class & Twenty20 Captain**; Plays for **Royal Challengers Bangalore** in IPL
Akshat Raghuwanshi	15 September 2003 (age 23)	Right-handed	Slow left-arm orthodox	Plays for **Lucknow Super Giants** in IPL
Aniket Verma	5 February 2002 (age 24)	Right-handed	Right-arm medium	Plays for **Sunrisers Hyderabad** in IPL
Ankush Singh	12 October 1998 (age 28)	Left-handed	Right-arm leg break	
Chanchal Rathore	29 November 2002 (age 23)	Right-handed	Right-arm off break	
Atharva Mahajan	8 December 2003 (age 22)	Left-handed	Slow left-arm orthodox	
Saksham Purohit	31 January 2006 (age 20)	Right-handed		
All-rounders
**Venkatesh Iyer**	25 December 1994 (age 31)	Left-handed	Right-arm medium	**List A Captain**; Plays for **Royal Challengers Bangalore** in IPL
Shubham Sharma	24 December 1993 (age 32)	Right-handed	Right-arm off break	
**Saransh Jain**	31 March 1993 (age 33)	Left-handed	Right-arm off break	
Shivang Kumar	26 May 2002 (age 24)	Right-handed	Slow left-arm unorthodox	Plays for **Sunrisers Hyderabad** in IPL
Wicket-keepers
Himanshu Mantri	9 February 1994 (age 32)	Left-handed		
Harsh Gawli	9 November 1998 (age 28)	Right-handed		
Apurve Dwivedi	27 October 2000 (age 26)	Right-handed		
Spinners
Kumar Kartikeya	26 December 1997 (age 28)	Right-handed	Slow left-arm orthodox	
Shivam Shukla	11 December 1995 (age 30)	Right-handed	Right-arm leg break	
Fast-bowlers
Aryan Pandey	23 January 2004 (age 22)	Right-handed	Right-arm medium	
Tripuresh Singh	13 April 2002 (age 24)	Right-handed	Right-arm fast-medium	
Arshad Khan	20 December 1997 (age 28)	Left-handed	Left-arm medium	Plays for **Gujarat Titans** in IPL
Rahul Batham	21 August 1998 (age 28)	Right-handed	Right-arm medium	
Mangesh Yadav	10 October 2002 (age 24)	Left-handed	Left-arm medium	
**Avesh Khan**	13 December 1996 (age 29)	Right-handed	Right-arm fast-medium	
Ravi Kiran	1 February 1991 (age 35)	Right-handed	Right-arm medium	

Updated as on 17 November 2026

== Coaching staff ==
Coaching staff for team are listed below:

- Head Coach: Chandrakant Pandit
- Trainer: Mayank Agarwal
- Physio: Balasaheb Tate

== Former players ==
- List of Madhya Pradesh first-class players
- List of Madhya Pradesh List A players
- List of Madhya Pradesh Twenty20 players

== Records ==
For more details on this topic, see List of Madhya Pradesh first-class cricket records, List of Madhya Pradesh List A cricket records, List of Madhya Pradesh Twenty20 cricket records.

== Grounds ==
=== Holkar Stadium ===
Madhya Pradesh play the majority of their home matches at the Holkar Stadium.

=== Captain Roop Singh Stadium ===
Madhya Pradesh's second home is Captain Roop Singh Stadium in Gwalior
