= List of North Zone cricketers =

This is a list of all cricketers who have played first-class or List A cricket for North Zone cricket team.

Last updated at the end of the 2015/16 season.

== A–F ==
* Hemu Adhikari
- Imtiaz Ahmed
- Maqsood Ahmed
- Zulfiqar Ahmed
- Hyder Ali
- Lala Amarnath
- Mohinder Amarnath
- Rajinder Amarnath
- Surinder Amarnath
- Parvinder Awana
- Bharat Awasthy
- Kirti Azad
- Bantoo Singh
- Bishan Singh Bedi
- Samiullah Beigh
- Amit Bhandari
- Prakash Bhandari
- Prem Bhatia
- Rajat Bhatia
- Vishal Bhatia
- Bhupinder Singh
- Bhupinder Singh
- Puneet Bisht
- Manvinder Bisla
- Sivaji Bose
- Sanjay Budhwar
- Ravinder Chadha
- Yuzvendra Chahal
- Samir Chakrabarti
- Malhotra Chamanlal
- Unmukt Chand
- Mohan Chaturvedi
- Chetan Chauhan
- Vedraj Chauhan
- Aakash Chopra
- Nikhil Chopra
- Prashant Chopra
- Yogendra Chowdhury
- Nari Contractor
- Vijay Dahiya
- Daljit Singh
- Vijay Dandekar
- Ashu Dani
- Bal Dani
- Kapil Dev
- Rahul Dewan
- Ramesh Dewan
- P. K. Dharmalingam
- Pankaj Dharmani
- Shiraz Dharsi
- Rishi Dhawan
- Shikhar Dhawan
- Paras Dogra
- Sumeet Dogra

== G–L ==
* Chandrasekhar Gadkari
- Gagandeep Singh
- Gautam Gambhir
- Ashok Gandotra
- Rajinder Ghai
- Feroze Ghayas
- William Ghosh
- Hari Gidwani
- Sanjay Gill
- Karan Goel
- Rajinder Goel
- Manpreet Gony
- Ashwani Gupta
- Gurkeerat Singh
- Gursharan Singh
- Harbhajan Singh
- Harcharan Singh
- Harvinder Singh
- Anwar Hussain
- Ian Dev Singh
- Inayat Khan
- Gokul Inder Dev
- Kumar Indrajitsinhji
- Jenni Irani
- Ajay Jadeja
- Jahangir Khan
- Pradeep Jain
- Vineet Jain
- Jaskaran Singh
- Ajay Jha
- Jiwanjot Singh
- Obaid Kamal
- Sarul Kanwar
- Aashish Kapoor
- Ashwini Kapoor
- Abdul Kardar
- Siddarth Kaul
- Uday Kaul
- Amarjit Kaypee
- Khan Mohammad
- Anil Khanna
- Surinder Khanna
- Arun Khurana
- Gogumal Kishenchand
- Virat Kohli
- Budhi Kunderan
- Soumendranath Kundu
- Sarabjit Ladda
- Akash Lal
- Arun Lal
- Chuni Lal
- Madan Lal
- Muni Lal
- Raman Lamba
- Vinay Lamba
- Suresh Luthra

== M–R ==
* Chandan Madan
- Fazal Mahmood
- Akash Malhotra
- Ashok Malhotra
- Vikramjeet Malik
- Mandeep Singh
- Mithun Manhas
- Maninder Singh
- Ajay Mehra
- Gulshan Mehra
- Madan Mehra
- Ramprakash Mehra
- Vijay Mehra
- Ashwini Minna
- Amit Mishra
- Vikas Mishra
- Mohammad Saeed
- Dinesh Mongia
- V. M. Muddiah
- Abid Nabi
- Yogesh Nagar
- Arjun Naidu
- Chetanya Nanda
- Satish Nanda
- Sumit Narwal
- Navdeep Singh
- Manu Nayyar
- Rajeev Nayyar
- Nazar Mohammad
- Ashish Nehra
- Sandir Om Prakash
- Rajinder Pal
- Rajat Paliwal
- Dhruv Pandove
- M. P. Pandove
- Dhiraj Parsana
- Iftikhar Ali Khan Pataudi
- Mansur Ali Khan Pataudi
- Harshal Patel
- Yadavindra Singh
- Dattu Phadkar
- Bhaskar Pillai
- Manoj Prabhakar
- Rajesh Puri
- Abdul Qayoom
- Kanwar Rai Singh
- Vijay Rajindernath
- Rajinder Singh
- Sachin Rana
- Vasant Ranjane
- Parvez Rasool
- Vikram Rathour
- Ajay Ratra
- Mahesh Rawat
- Vivek Razdan
- Ravneet Ricky
- Robin Singh

== S–Z ==
* Nitin Saini
- Rahul Sanghvi
- Pradeep Sangwan
- Sarandeep Singh
- Dipankar Sarkar
- Ramesh Saxena
- Virender Sehwag
- Apoorva Sengupta
- Gajendra Singh Shaktawat
- Shakti Singh
- Amit Sharma
- Ajay Sharma
- Arun Sharma
- Bipul Sharma
- Chetan Sharma
- Ishant Sharma
- Joginder Sharma
- Manish Sharma
- Mohit Sharma
- Manohar Sharma
- Rahul Sharma
- Rajesh Sharma
- Sanjeev Sharma
- Vineet Sharma
- Yashpal Sharma
- Sher Mohammad
- Anand Shukla
- Rakesh Shukla
- Mayank Sidhana
- Navjot Singh Sidhu
- Ravi Inder Singh
- V. R. V. Singh
- Ponnuswami Sitaram
- Reetinder Singh Sodhi
- Sunny Sohal
- Anant Solkar
- Man Sood
- Venkat Sunderam
- Sunny Singh
- Surendranath
- Pawan Suyal
- Narain Swamy
- Swaranjit Singh
- Sarkar Talwar
- Vikas Tokas
- Umesh Kumar
- Amit Uniyal
- Sunil Valson
- Nakul Verma
- Bharati Vij
- Rajiv Vinayak
- Manan Vohra
- Atul Wassan
- Chester Watson
- Vijay Yadav
- Yashpal Singh
- Yograj Singh
- Yuvraj Singh
