= List of Delhi cricketers =

This is a list of all cricketers who have played first-class, List A or Twenty20 cricket for the Delhi cricket team. Seasons given are first and last seasons; the player did not necessarily play in all the intervening seasons. Players in bold have played international cricket.

Last updated at the end of the 2015/16 season.

== A ==
- Abdul Hai, 1934/35-1935/36
- Abdul Hamid, 1936/37
- Abdul Majid, 1936/37
- Abdur Rauf, 1944/45-1946/47
- Mohit Ahlawat, 2015/16
- Akhtar Hussain, 1945/46
- **Mohinder Amarnath**, 1974/75-1988/89
- Rajinder Amarnath, 1981/82
- **Surinder Amarnath**, 1974/75-1981/82
- Jagrit Anand, 2011/12-2014/15
- Tummala Anand, 2001/02
- BN Andley, 1964/65
- Sandeep Angurala, 1994/95-2000/01
- Anwar Khan, 1938/39-1939/40
- Arun Singh, 1998/99-2002/03
- Vemulapally Arvind, 1991/92-1992/93
- Ashanul Haque, 1945/46
- Gerald Aste, 1935/36
- **Parvinder Awana**, 2007/08-2015/16
- Bharat Awasthy, 1958/59-1960/61
- **Kirti Azad**, 1977/78-1993/94

== B ==
- Badaruddin Malik, 1946/47
- Bikker Bahadur, 1980/81
- Kiran Bahadur, 1938/39-1948/49
- Shiv Bahry, 1950/51-1951/52
- S Balaram, 1979/80-1980/81
- Abhinav Bali, 2003/04-2006/07
- Balwant Singh, 1967/68-1970/71
- Bantoo Singh, 1985/86-1995/96
- Jaswant Bawa, 1949/50-1952/53
- **Bishan Bedi**, 1968/69-1980/81
- Dharam Beniwal, 1996/97
- Hargopal Berry, 1948/49
- **Amit Bhandari**, 1997/98-2008/09
- Arvind Bhandari, 1958/59
- **Prakash Bhandari**, 1952/53-1968/69
- Anil Bhardwaj, 1975/76
- Sanjay Bhardwaj, 1986/87-1987/88
- Suboth Bhati, 2015/16
- Ajit Bhatia, 1955/56
- Anand Bhatia, 1966/67
- Prem Bhatia, 1958/59-1968/69
- Rajat Bhatia, 2003/04-2014/15
- Saket Bhatia, 2002/03
- Manohar Bhide, 1943/44
- Bhupinder Singh, 1983/84
- Bhupinder Singh, 1997/98
- Vijay Bhushan, 1960/61-1962/63
- Bishan Bihari, 1948/49-1952/53
- Puneet Bisht, 2005/06-2015/16
- Geoffrey Bull, 1935/36-1936/37

== C ==
- Unmukt Chand, 2009/10-2015/16
- Jyotish Chander, 1956/57
- KS Chatrapalsinhji, 1957/58
- Mohan Chaturvedi, 1989/90-1995/96
- Harendra Chaudhary, 1996/97-2003/04
- **Chetan Chauhan**, 1975/76-1984/85
- HS Chauhan, 1980/81
- Manoj Chauhan, 2010/11-2013/14
- Pratap Chauhan, 1958/59
- Neeraj Chawla, 1999/00
- Pradeep Chawla, 2000/01-2007/08
- Gaurav Chhabra, 2005/06-2010/11
- Mohan Chibber, 1990/91
- Pravesh Chimkara, 2009/10
- **Aakash Chopra**, 1996/97-2009/10
- Deepak Chopra, 1980/81-1982/83
- **Nikhil Chopra**, 1993/94-2000/01
- Rajneesh Chopra, 1993/94-1998/99
- Dilip Chowdhury, 1962/63
- Yogendra Chowdhury, 1953/54-1958/59

== D ==
- **Vijay Dahiya**, 1993/94-2006/07
- Daljit Singh, 1965/66
- Michael Dalvi, 1966/67
- Ashu Dani, 1994/95-2000/01
- Darshan Swaroop, 1949/50-1952/53
- Ishwar Dayal, 1944/45-1948/49
- Anthony de Mello, 1940/41-1945/46
- Ramesh Dewan, 1959/60-1960/61
- Meghraj Dhannu, 1969/70-1972/73
- Dharam Vir, 1967/68
- **Shikhar Dhawan**, 2004/05-2015/16
- GM Din, 1934/35-1939/40
- Ajay Divecha, 1964/65
- Mukesh Diwan, 2005/06
- Rahul Dixit, 1980/81-1987/88
- Thomas Dixon, 1934/35-1936/37
- Sumeet Dogra, 1993/94-1998/99
- Baldev Dua, 1968/69
- Karun Dubey, 1978/79
- Ravi Dutt, 1951/52-1952/53
- Surendra Dyama, 2000/01-2001/02

== E ==
- Antony Edwards, 1946/47
- Ejaz Ahmed, 1942/43-1945/46
- Onkar Elhence, 1934/35
- Charles Evette, 1938/39

== F ==
- Farman Ahmed, 2009/10-2011/12
- Fasihuddin, 1938/39
- Fateh Mahomed, 1939/40
- Fazal, 1935/36
- Fahad Samar 2010–11

== G ==
- **Gautam Gambhir**, 1999/00-2015/16
- **Ashok Gandotra**, 1965/66-1974/75
- Rajesh Gehlot, 1999/00-2000/01
- Feroze Ghayas, 1992/93-1997/98
- Hari Gidwani, 1972/73-1977/78
- Sanjay Gill, 1999/00-2004/05
- Munish Giri, 1998/99
- Rajinder Goel, 1963/64-1972/73
- Manoj Gupta, 1980/81
- Radhey Gupta, 2001/02-2002/03
- Ranjan Gupta, 2003/04-2005/06
- Vinod Gupta, 1969/70
- Gurbaksh Singh, 1943/44-1946/47
- **Gursharan Singh**, 1981/82-1985/86
- **Gaurav Chhabra** 2008–2010
- Gourav Kumar, 2018–19

== H ==
- Rajan Handa, 1993/94
- Hargopal Singh, 1943/44-1958/59
- Shekhar Haridas, 1965/66
- Harpreet Singh, 1989/90-1993/94
- Himmat Singh, 2015/16

== I ==
- Idrees Baig, 1935/36-1945/46
- Gokul Inder Dev, 1961/62-1962/63
- Inderjit Singh, 1965/66-1976/77
- **Kumar Indrajitsinhji**, 1958/59-1960/61

== J ==
- Edward Jackson, 1946/47
- **Ajay Jadeja**, 2003/04-2004/05
- Aditya Jain, 2005/06-2010/11
- Anil Jain, 1963/64-1965/66
- Devendra Jain, 1984/85
- GC Jain, 1949/50
- Pradeep Jain, 1986/87-1989/90
- Jamilul Hai, 1940/41-1944/45
- Jamilur Rehman, 1938/39
- Jaspal Singh, 1986/87-1987/88
- Jaswant Singh, 1947/48
- Joginder Singh, 2009/10-2010/11
- Johnnie Johnson, 1942/43
- Pankaj Joshi, 1996/97-2000/01
- Sunil Joshi, 1999/00-2003/04
- Ankur Julka, 2009/10-2011/12

== K ==
- BR Kagal, 1934/35
- Ahmed Kamal, 1942/43
- Dharshan Kanjania, 2008/09-2009/10
- Pradeep Kanojia, 1980/81
- Ravinder Kapila, 1980/81
- Ashwini Kapoor, 1984/85-1985/86
- Gian Kapoor, 1947/48-1951/52
- GL Kapoor, 1934/35
- Raj Kapoor, 1993/94
- Praveen Kashyap, 1976/77
- Aditya Kaushik, 2013/14-2015/16
- Khalil-ur-Rehman, 1942/43
- Khallil Ahmed, 1938/39
- Javed Khan, 2013/14
- Anilkumar Khanna, 1955/56-1964/65
- Balbir Khanna, 1948/49
- Satish Khanna, 1947/48-1966/67
- **Surinder Khanna**, 1976/77-1987/88
- Jogesh Khattar, 1965/66
- Arun Khurana, 1978/79-1982/83
- Shashikant Khurana, 1984/85-1986/87
- Vivek Khurana, 2001/02
- H Kishenchand, 1943/44-1952/53
- Pradeep Kochar, 1980/81-1982/83
- **Virat Kohli**, 2005/06-2013/14
- Satyendra Kuckreja, 1953/54-1955/56
- Milind Kumar, 2009/10-2015/16
- Pawan Kumar, 1982/83
- Varun Kumar, 2001/02-2005/06

== L ==
- Lakshman, 1936/37
- Akash Lal, 1959/60-1968/69
- **Arun Lal**, 1974/75-1980/81
- Ishwar Lal, 1939/40-1942/43
- Kunal Lal, 2003/04-2007/08
- **Madan Lal**, 1972/73-1989/90
- **Raman Lamba**, 1978/79-1997/98
- Vinay Lamba, 1967/68-1980/81
- Major Leach, 1943/44
- SS Lee, 1976/77
- Lekhraj, 1952/53
- Suresh Luthra, 1967/68-1979/80

== M ==
- Devashish Mahanti, 1982/83
- Mahipetsinhji, 1947/48
- Akash Malhotra, 1993/94-1999/00
- Ashish Malhotra, 1998/99-2006/07
- MC Malhotra, 1952/53-1953/54
- Omi Malhotra, 1949/50-1952/53
- Gagan Malik, 1999/00
- Yesh Manchanda, 1960/61
- Mithun Manhas, 1997/98-2014/15
- **Maninder Singh**, 1980/81-1993/94
- Manoj Singh, 1993/94-1994/95
- M. H. Maqsood, 1934/35-1944/45
- Ashwini Marwah, 1970/71-1973/74
- Masud Yar Khan, 1940/41
- Anil Mathur, 1970/71-1973/74
- Bishan Mathur, 1940/41-1947/48
- CB Mathur, 1952/53-1959/60
- KL Mathur, 1951/52-1955/56
- RB Mathur, 1964/65-1965/66
- Mazhar Hussain, 1944/45
- Ayudhia Mehra, 1958/59
- Gulshan Rai Mehra, 1957/58-1966/67
- Madan Mehra, 1953/54-1957/58
- Puneet Mehra, 2009/10-2011/12
- Rajan Mehra, 1953/54-1959/60
- Rohit Mehra, 1998/99-1999/00
- Ram Prakash Mehra, 1934/35-1946/47
- Sheel Mehra, 1970/71-1974/75
- **Vijay Mehra**, 1963/64-1970/71
- Vijay Mishra, 1990/91
- Vikas Mishra, 2009/10-2013/14
- Mohammad Afzal, 1946/47
- Mohammad Ishaq, 1940/41-1944/45
- Sardar Mohammad Khan, 1939/40
- Mohammad Yunus, 1940/41-1945/46
- Mohammad Zafar, 1935/36-1938/39
- Surinder Mohan, 1970/71
- Atul Mohindra, 1986/87-1992/93
- Mohd Javed Mohd Javed 2007-2008/14]]
- Musa Khan, 1934/35-
- Yogesh Nagar, 2008/09-2015/16
- Chetanya Nanda, 2004/05-2010/11
- Satish Nanda, 1955/56
- Raj Narain, 1966/67-1972/73
- Shiv Narain, 1944/45
- Suraj Narain, 1943/44-1945/46
- Pulkit Narang, 2015/16
- Narender Singh, 2007/08
- Sumit Narwal, 2007/08-2015/16
- Kartar Nath, 1992/93-1996/97
- Manu Nayyar, 1986/87-1993/94
- Syed Nazir Hussain, 1934/35-1936/37
- Narender Negi, 2001/02-2007/08
- **Pawan Negi**, 2011/12-2015/16
- **Ashish Nehra**, 1997/98-2015/16
- WH Neville, 1935/36

== O ==
- Praveen Oberoi, 1972/73-1980/81
- Salil Oberoi, 2002/03-2003/04
- Om Kishore, 1949/50
- Om Kishore, 1957/58-1959/60

== P ==
- **Rajinder Pal**, 1954/55-1971/72
- Ravinder Pal, 1964/65-1966/67
- Rishabh Pant, 2015/16
- Parvinder Singh, 1969/70
- Saurabh Passi, 2013/14
- **Mansur Ali Khan Pataudi**, 1960/61-1964/65
- Sheetal Pathak, 1993/94
- Sudhir Pathak, 1977/78-1981/82
- Rajesh Peter, 1980/81-1983/84
- Bhaskar Pillai, 1982/83-1994/95
- **Manoj Prabhakar**, 1982/83-1996/97
- Prabjot Singh, 1973/74
- Gyaneshwar Prasad, 1958/59-1973/74
- Sushil Kumar Prasad, 1982/83-1984/85
- Pratyush Singh, 2013/14-2014/15
- Premnath, 1945/46
- Prithviraj, 1950/51
- Dev Puri, 1947/48
- Pururaj Singh, 2003/04
- Prince Yadav, 2023/24–

== Q ==
- Qamaruddin Butt, 1946/47

== R ==
- Ravi Raj, 1974/75
- Rajinder Singh, 1980/81-1984/85
- Nitish Rana, 2012/13-2015/16
- Rahul Verma Rajput, 2015/16
- Ranbir Singh, 1966/67-1967/68
- Rashid, 1938/39
- Rajiv Rathore, 1998/99-2002/03
- Abdul Rauf, 1999/00-2002/03
- Balaji Rao, 1955/56-1960/61
- Krishna Rao, 1947/48
- Mohinder Rawal, 1966/67
- Vaibhav Rawal, 2012/13-2015/16
- Kuldeep Rawat, 2002/03-2011/12
- Sarang Rawat, 2015/16
- Maharaja Razdan, 1949/50
- **Vivek Razdan**, 1991/92-1992/93
- Riazul Hussain, 1939/40
- **Robin Singh, Jr.**, 1994/95-2000/01

== S ==
- Joginder Saberwal, 1951/52-1955/56
- Yogesh Sachdeva, 2005/06-2006/07
- Rohit Sahni, 1971/72
- Navdeep Saini, 2013/14-2015/16
- Ragubhir Saini, 1959/60-1968/69
- Rishit Saini, 2011/12
- Shankar Saini, 1986/87-1990/91
- Salahuddin Khan, 1944/45-1945/46
- Saleem, 1942/43-1946/47
- Satish Salwan, 1994/95-1996/97
- Samarth Singh, 2013/14
- **Rahul Sanghvi**, 1995/96-2006/07
- Pradeep Sangwan, 2006/07-2015/16
- **Sarandeep Singh**, 2001/02-2005/06
- Satya Dev, 1958/59
- Daljit Singh Saxena, 1967/68-1976/77
- Laxmi Chand Saxena, 1947/48-1956/57
- **Ramesh Saxena**, 1960/61-1965/66
- Ravi Sehgal, 1992/93-1995/96
- Sunny Sehrawat, 2011/12
- **Virender Sehwag**, 1997/98-2014/15
- J Sen, 1940/41-1945/46
- JN Seth, 1949/50
- Raju Sethi, 1980/81-1983/84
- SM Shafi, 1939/40
- Shakti Singh, 1993/94-1996/97
- Shamsunder, 1938/39
- Abhay Sharma, 1987/88-1990/91
- Abhishek Sharma, 2001/02-2009/10
- **Ajay Sharma**, 1984/85-1999/00
- Chetan Sharma, 2010/11-2011/12
- Davendra Sharma, 1993/94-2000/01
- Deepak Sharma, 1981/82
- Hitesh Sharma, 1991/92-1993/94
- **Ishant Sharma**, 2005/06-2015/16
- Kshitiz Sharma, 2012/13-2014/15
- Manan Sharma, 2007/08-2015/16
- Mohit Sharma, 2009/10-2013/14
- **Rahul Sharma**, 1986/87 (played international cricket for Hong Kong)
- Rajkumar Sharma, 1986/87-1990/91
- Sanjay Sharma, 1988/89-1992/93
- Sanjeev Sharma, 1960/61-1963/64
- **Sanjeev Sharma**, 1983/84-1990/91
- Shivam Sharma, 2014/15-2015/16
- Suhail Sharma, 2005/06-2007/08
- Vishal Sharma, 1999/00-2000/01
- Shelly Shaurya, 2012/13-2013/14
- Shawej Khan, 2010/11
- Sher Mohammad, 1965/66
- Dhruv Shorey, 2012/13-2015/16
- Shujauddin Siddiqi, 1939/40-1945/46
- Anand Shukla, 1965/66
- **Rakesh Shukla**, 1969/70-1985/86
- Ponnuswami Sitaram, 1956/57-1967/68
- RS Sondhi, 1973/74-1974/75
- Vijay Sondhi, 1963/64-1964/65
- **Man Sood**, 1956/57-1964/65
- Varun Sood, 2011/12-2014/15
- S Srinivasan, 1949/50
- Shirish Srivastava, 1984/85-1987/88
- Akash Sudan, 2015/16
- Sukhvinder Singh, 1986/87-1992/93
- Sultan, 1936/37
- Amit Suman, 1998/99-2001/02
- Venkat Sunderam, 1970/71-1980/81
- Sunil Dev, 1969/70
- Surajuddin, 1936/37
- Pawan Suyal, 2009/10-2015/16
- Anand Swaroop, 1960/61

== T ==
- Tajammul Hussain, 1934/35-1939/40
- Mayank Tehlan, 2003/04-2010/11
- Praveen Thapur, 1994/95
- Tilak Raj, 1980/81-1983/84
- G Tilak Raj, 1964/65-1967/68
- Vijay Tiwari, 1961/62
- Vikas Tokas, 2012/13-2015/16
- MS Toorie, 1934/35
- Tuljaram, 1947/48-1956/57
- Turab Ali, 1945/46-1946/47

== V ==
- Gautam Vadhera, 1992/93-1995/96
- Ravi Vaid, 1948/49-1958/59
- Sonu Vaid, 2001/02-2002/03
- Sunil Valson, 1977/78-1985/86
- Rajeswar Vats, 1973/74-1975/76
- Bharat Veer, 2009/10
- Siddharth Verma, 2002/03
- Pranshu Vijayran, 2014/15
- Rajiv Vinayak, 1986/87-1995/96
- Hiralal Vohra, 1947/48-1955/56

== W ==
- **Atul Wassan**, 1986/87-1997/98
- **Chester Watson**, 1962/63 (played international cricket for West Indies)
- Oniel Wilson, 1990/91-1997/98

== Y ==
- Kapil Yadav, 2008/09-2010/11
- Rahul Yadav, 2008/09-2015/16
- Yakub, 1938/39
- Jitendra Yeshpal, 1956/57-1958/59
- Yusuf Nanjrani, 1940/41
