= Chawla =

Chawla, also spelled Chowla, is a surname of Punjabi and Sindhi Hindus and Sikhs of India. It originates from the name of a clan of the Arora caste, likely stemming from the crop word chawal, which means rice.

== Notable people ==
Notable people with the surname, who may or may not be affiliated with the clan/religions, include:

- Anil Kumar Chawla, Indian Navy vice admiral
- Baldev Raj Chawla (1938–2024), Indian politician
- Bhumika Chawla (born 1978), Indian actress
- Bobby Chawla (born 1982), Danish cricketer
- Devika Chawla, Indian pop singer
- Diwan Chand Chawla, Pakistani politician
- Harcharan Chawla (1926–2001), Indian Urdu writer
- Harpinder Singh Chawla (born 1950), Indian dental surgeon and medical researcher
- Himani Chawla, Indian television actress
- Himanshu Chawla (born 1991), Indian cricketer
- Isha Chawla (born 1988), Indian film actress
- Juhi Chawla (born 1967), Indian actress
- Kailash Chawla (born 1948), Indian politician
- Kalpana Chawla (1962–2003), Indian-American astronaut killed in the Space Shuttle Columbia disaster
- Karm Chawla (born 1985), Indian director and cinematographer
- Keerthi Chawla (born 1981), Indian actress
- Laxmi Kanta Chawla, Indian politician
- Louise Chawla, American professor
- Mukesh Kumar Chawla (born 1974), Pakistani politician
- Narendra Chawla (born 1961), Indian politician
- Navin Chawla (1945–2025), Indian civil servant and writer
- Neeraj Chawla (born 1979), Indian cricketer
- Nitesh Chawla, Indian American computer scientist
- Piyush Chawla (born 1988), Indian cricketer
- Prabhu Chawla (born 1946), Indian journalist and editor of India Today
- Pradeep Chawla (born 1980), Indian cricketer
- Preetika Chawla, Indian film actress
- Rajendra Chawla, Indian actor
- Ram Nath Chawla (1903–1986), Indian pilot
- Ratna Bhagwandas Chawla, Pakistani politician and the first Hindu woman elected to the Pakistan Senate
- Sarvadaman Chowla (1907–1995), Indian American mathematician
- Shuchi Chawla, US-based Indian computer scientist
- Surveen Chawla (born 1984), Indian actress
- Tarang Chawla (born 1987), Indian-born Australian activist and writer
- Varun Chawla (born 1981), Indian entrepreneur
- Yogesh Kumar Chawla, Indian medical doctor

== Other uses ==
- Chawla (crater), a lunar crater named after Kalpana Chawla.
- Rakshata Chawla, a fictional character in the Japanese science fiction anime series Code Geass
