= Indian cricket team in Ceylon in 1956–57 =

International cricket tour

The Indian national cricket team toured Ceylon in November 1956 and played two internationals against Ceylon. As Ceylon had not then achieved Test status, the internationals are classified as first-class matches. Both games were played at the Paikiasothy Saravanamuttu Stadium in Colombo and ended as draws.

== The Indian team ==
- Polly Umrigar (captain)
- Ghulam Ahmed
- Madhav Apte
- Prakash Bhandari
- Yogendra Chowdhury
- Nari Contractor
- Subhash Gupte
- Satish Khanna
- A. G. Kripal Singh
- Vijay Manjrekar
- Bapu Nadkarni
- Mohan Rai
- Gulabrai Ramchand
- Pankaj Roy
- Naren Tamhane

It was a strong Indian team: 11 of the 15 had already played Test cricket.

== The tour ==
- Ceylon v India, Colombo Oval, Colombo, 11, 12, 13 November 1956. Ceylon 120, India 119 for 3.

Only a few overs were possible on the first day owing to rain. On the second morning the umpires declared the pitch unfit for play, although sunshine soon afterwards made the ground fit for play. By then the teams had left the ground. The crowd expressed their displeasure at being denied what they thought should have been almost a full day's play. On the third day A. C. M. Lafir top-scored for Ceylon with 55. Gupte took 5 for 55. Contractor scored 65 not out for India.

- A two-day match followed immediately in Kandy on 14 and 15 November. The Indians declared at 218 for 3 and dismissed Central Province for 69 and 36. Ramchand made 101, and Ghulam Ahmed took 5 for 10 and 6 for 7.
- Ceylon v India, Colombo Oval, Colombo, 17, 18, 19 November 1956. India 283 and 125 for 2 declared, Ceylon 150 and 93 for 5.

India set Ceylon 259 runs to win in 75 minutes. Contractor was again India's leading scorer, with 78 and 42. Gamini Goonesena took 7 for 69 then top-scored with 48. Vernon Prins had captained Ceylon in the first match but after the poor organisation of the match ruined it as a contest he refused to play in the second match. Goonesena replaced him as captain.
