= Khurana (surname) =

Hindu and Sikh surname from khatri community

Khurana (Hindi: खुराना), also spelled Khorana, is a Punjabi Hindu and Sikh surname associated with the Arora and Khatri communities of India.

Notable people with the surname include:

- Aanchal Khurana, Indian actress
- Aditi Khorana, Indian-American writer
- Akash Khurana, Indian actor, screenwriter and entrepreneur
- Akarsh Khurana, Indian actor, writer and director
- Anita Raj Khurana (born 1963), Indian actress
- Aparshakti Khurana (born 1987), Indian actor
- Ayushmann Khurrana (born 1984), Indian actor
- Chirag Khurana (born 1992), Indian cricketer
- Darasing Khurana (born 1992), Indian actor and model
- Har Gobind Khorana (1922–2011), Indian American biochemist, Nobel Prize winner
- Harish Khurana (born 1974), Indian politician
- Harsh Khurana, Indian television actor
- Himanshi Khurana (born 1991), Indian model, actress and singer
- Jagdish Raj Khurana (1928–2013), Indian actor
- Jatin Khurana (born 1984), Indian actor
- Kireet Khurana (born 1967), Indian filmmaker and animator
- Madan Lal Khurana (1936–2018), Indian politician and Chief Minister of Delhi
- Nikhil Khurana (born 1988), Indian actor
- Raj Khurana (1956–2016), Indian politician
- Rakesh Khurana (born 1967), Indian American professor and former Dean of Harvard College
- Rohit Khurana (born 1983), Indian actor
- Sachin Khurana, Indian model and actor
- Sarita Khurana (born 1970), American director and producer
- Shanno Khurana (born 1927), Indian classical vocalist and composer
- Shashikant Khurana (born 1966), Indian cricketer
- Shivam Khurana (born 1991), Indian cricketer
- Sonia Khurana (born 1968), Indian artist
- Sundar Lal Khurana (1918–2007), Indian bureaucrat
- Swati Khurana (born 1975), American writer and artist
- Vivek Khurana (born 1984), Indian cricketer
