= 1969–70 Duleep Trophy =

- Dates: 5 September 1969 – 27 October 1969
- Administrator(s): BCCI
- Cricket format: First-class cricket
- Tournament format(s): Knockout
- Champions: West Zone (6th title)
- Participants: 5
- Matches: 4
- Most runs: Vinay Lamba (NZ) (196)
- Most wickets: Uday Joshi (WZ), Bishan Singh Bedi (NZ) & Hanumant Singh (CZ) (11 each)

The 1969–70 Duleep Trophy was the ninth season of the Duleep Trophy, a first-class cricket tournament contested by five zonal teams of India: Central Zone, East Zone, North Zone, South Zone and West Zone.

West Zone won the title, defeating North Zone in the final.

== Results ==
Quarterfinal
Central Zone	C
East Zone

Semifinals
Central Zone
West Zone	FIL
South Zone
North Zone	W

Final
West Zone	W
North Zone

=== Final ===
24–27 October 1969
Scorecard

West Zone	v	North Zone
412 (141 overs); Rusi Surti 127; Mohinder Amarnath 3/89		176 (100 overs); Vinay Lamba 68; Ashok Mankad 5/21
		155 (54 overs); Ashok Gandotra 48; Uday Joshi 5/23

West Zone won by an innings and 81 runs
Sardar Vallabhbhai Patel Stadium, Ahmedabad

- West Zone won the toss and elected to bat.
