= Rohit Mehra =

Rohit Mehra may refer to:

- Rohit Mehra (Krrish), a character in the Krrish franchise
- Rohit Mehra (cricketer) (born 1978), Indian cricketer
