= Gambhirban =

Coordinates: 25°57′N 83°11′E

Gambhirban is a small village in Rani Ki Sarai block, Azamgarh district, Uttar Pradesh, India. It is located about 10 kilometres (6.2 mi) from the city of Azamgarh, near a large pond called Baraila Taal. It is situated near the village of Kanaila Chakrapanipur, home of Rahul Sankrityayan, a Hindi/Sanskrit scholar.

The village is dominated by landowners of Raghuvanshi and Dikshit Rajputs. The land belongs to engineers, teachers, and members of the armed forces. The village has the usual amenities and is located close to a state hospital, the PGI Hospital.
