= Vinod Gupta (disambiguation) =

Vinod Gupta is an American businessman

Vinod Gupta may also refer to:

- Vinod Gupta (cricketer); an Indian cricketer.
- Vinod Kumar Gupta; former Chief Justice of Uttarakhand High Court.
