= Bharati Vij =

Indian cricketer

Personal information
- Born: 9 January 1967 (age 59); Ludhiana, Punjab, India
- Batting: Right-handed
- Bowling: Slow left-arm orthodox
- Role: Bowler

Domestic team information
- Years: Team
- 1987/88–1997/98: Punjab

Career statistics
Competition	FC	List A
Matches	72	28
Runs scored	786	83
Batting average	13.10	8.30
100s/50s	0/0	0/0
Top score	42	14
Balls bowled	17,724	1,557
Wickets	319	45
Bowling average	23.41	19.35
5 wickets in innings	24	0
10 wickets in match	8	n/a
Best bowling	7/27	4/29
Catches/stumpings	32/–	4/–
- Source: ESPNcricinfo, 1 January 2016

Bharati Vij (born 9 January 1967) is a former Indian first-class cricketer who played for Punjab. After retirement, he became an umpire and also started a cricket academy.

== Career ==
Vij made his first-class debut for Punjab in the 1987/88 season. He came to the limelight in 1992–93 Ranji Trophy which Punjab won, by finishing as the highest wicket-taker of the tournament with 49 scalps at an average of 17.55. He took 6/61 and 3/33 in the final against Maharashtra at Ludhiana, leading Punjab to a 120-run victory and their maiden Ranji title.

In the following Ranji season, Vij took 38 wickets at 14.05 including five five-wicket hauls and two ten-wicket hauls to finish as the third-highest wicket-taker. Playing for North Zone in the 1994/95 Duleep Trophy, he took most number of wickets in the tournament (20). He finished with the most wickets in the following year's Duleep Trophy as well, with 26 wickets at 24.03. He was the second highest wicket-taker in 1996–97 Ranji Trophy with 53 wickets at 20.26 including six five-wicket hauls and three ten-wicket hauls.

With the emergence of Harbhajan Singh and Navdeep Singh, the 1997/98 season turned out to be the last for Vij despite finishing as his team's leading wicket-taker in that season's Ranji Trophy.

After retirement, Vij took up umpiring. In 2000, he became an on-field umpire for club cricket matches, before becoming a first-class and List A umpire in 2008. He also worked as the spin bowling coach for Punjab.

A cricket academy was started in Chandigarh called Bharati Vij Cricket Academy.
