= 2008–09 NKP Salve Challenger Trophy =

NKP Salve Challenger Trophy 2008/09
- Date: 23rd – 26th October 2008
- Location: Cuttack, Orissa, India
- Result: Won by India Blue
- Player of the series: Robin Uthappa (India Blue)
Teams
India Blue	India Red	India Green
Captains
(India) Yuvraj Singh	(India) Subramaniam Badrinath	(India) Mohammad Kaif
Most runs
Robin Uthappa (216)	Murali Vijay (164)	Naman Ojha (107)
Most wickets
Ravichandran Ashwin (8)	Piyush Chawla (5)	Yusuf Pathan (4); Manpreet Gony (4)

The 14th NKP Salve Challenger Trophy was an Indian domestic cricket tournament that was held in Cuttack from 23 October to 26 October 2008. The series involved the domestic teams from India which were India Blue, India Red, and India Green. India Blue defeated India Red by 8 wickets in the final to become the champions of the tournament.

== Squads ==
India Blue	India Red	India Green
Yuvraj Singh (c); Dinesh Karthik (vc & wk); Ajinkya Rahane; Robin Uthappa; Virat Kohli; Ravinder Singh; Irfan Pathan; Yogesh Takawale; Ashok Dinda; Pradeep Sangwan; Chetanya Nanda; Arjun Yadav; Siddharth Trivedi; Ravichandran Ashwin; ~~Amit Mishra~~	Subramaniam Badrinath (c); Rohit Sharma (vc); Murali Vijay; Faiz Fazal; Manoj Tiwary; Jaydev Shah; Abhishek Nayar; Wriddhiman Saha (wk); Praveen Kumar; Lakshmipathy Balaji; Piyush Chawla; Vinay Kumar; Monish Parmar; Parthiv Patel (wk)	Mohammad Kaif (c); Suresh Raina (vc); Shikhar Dhawan; Naman Ojha (wk); Cheteshwar Pujara; Saurabh Tiwary; Yusuf Pathan; Laxmi Ratan Shukla; Manpreet Gony; RP Singh; Pragyan Ojha; Rajat Bhatia; Abhinav Kumar; Pankaj Singh

- Chetanya Nanda replaced Amit Mishra in the India Blue squad, after he was retained in the Indian squad by selectors for the final two tests against Australia.

== Points Table ==
Pos	Team	Pld	W	L	NR	Pts	NRR
1	India Blue	2	2	0	0	8	0.716
2	India Red	2	1	1	0	4	−0.407
3	India Green	2	0	2	0	0	−0.295

Source: 'Points Table'

== Matches ==
=== Group stage ===
23 October 2008

India Blue; 235/9 (50 overs)	v	India Red; 186 (45.3 overs)
Robin Uthappa 94 (106); Praveen Kumar 2/34 (10 overs)		Murali Vijay 89 (107); Ravichandran Ashwin 3/27 (10 overs)

India Blue won by 49 runs.
Barabati Stadium, Cuttack
Umpires: Sanjay Hazare (IND) and Shavir Tarapore (IND)

- India Blue won the toss and elected to bat.
- Points: India Blue 4, India Red 0

24 October 2008

India Green; 260/9 (50 overs)	v	India Red; 263/5 (48.5 overs)
Naman Ojha 96 (130); Piyush Chawla 3/50 (10 overs)		Rohit Sharma 117* (120); Manpreet Gony 2/52 (9 overs)

India Red won by 5 wickets.
Barabati Stadium, Cuttack
Umpires: Amiesh Saheba (IND) and Sudhir Asnani (IND)

- India Green won the toss and elected to bat.
- Points: India Red 4, India Green 0

25 October 2008

India Blue; 218 (44.2 overs)	v	India Green; 199 (44 overs)
Robin Uthappa 76 (88); Yusuf Pathan 3/21 (6 overs)		Cheteshwar Pujara 65 (99); Ravichandran Ashwin 3/46 (9 overs)

India Blue won by 19 runs.
Barabati Stadium, Cuttack
Umpires: Sanjay Hazare (IND) and Shavir Tarapore (IND)

- India Green won the toss and elected to field.
- Due to rain, match was reduced to 45 overs.
- Points: India Blue 4, India Green 0

== Final ==
26 October 2008

India Red; 151 (43 overs)	v	India Blue; 152/2 (25.4 overs)
Subramaniam Badrinath 56 (95); Siddharth Trivedi 3/23 (7 overs)		Ajinkya Rahane 53 (64); Piyush Chawla 1/44 (7 overs)

India Blue won by 8 wickets.
Barabati Stadium, Cuttack
Umpires: Amiesh Saheba (IND) and Sudhir Asnani (IND)
Player of the match: Siddharth Trivedi (India Blue)

- India Red won the toss and elected to bat.
- India Blue became the winners of the NKP Salve Challenger Trophy 2008/09.
