= Arun Sharma =

Arun Sharma may refer to:

- Arun Sharma (Punjab cricketer) (born 1958), former Indian cricket player for Punjab, coach, selector and administrator
- Arun Sharma (Services cricketer) (born 1971), former Indian cricketer who played for J&K and Services, and coach
- Arun Kumar Sharma (1924–2017), Indian cytogeneticist, cell biologist, and cytochemist
- Arun Sarma, writer from Assam, India
- Arun Sharma (computer scientist), Indian-Australian professor
