= Hitesh Sharma =

Hitesh Sharma may refer to:

- Tesher, the Canadian-Indian rapper
- Hitesh Sharma (footballer)
- Hitesh Sharma (cricketer)
