= Gagan =

Gagan may refer to:

== Given name ==
- Gagan Bhagat, Indian politician and member of the Jammu and Kashmir Legislative Assembly
- Gagan Biyani, Indian American serial entrepreneur, marketer, and journalist
- Gagan Singh Bhandari, Nepalese General
- Gagan Bulathsinghala, Sri Lankan air officer
- Gagan Chandra Chatterjee, Indian classical violinist
- Gagan Dosanjh (born 1990), Indo-Canadian soccer player
- Gagan Harkara, Bengali Baul poet
- Gagan Khoda (born 1974), Indian cricketer
- Gagan Malik, Indian actor
- Gagan Malik (cricketer) (born 1976), Indian cricketer
- Gagan Mohindra, British politician
- Gagan Narang (born 1983), Indian shooter and Olympian
- Gagan Sikand, Canadian politician and MP
- Gagan Ajit Singh (born 1980), Indian field hockey player
- Gagan Thapa (born 1976), Nepali politician and government minister
- Gagan Ullalmath (born 1992), Indian swimmer
- Gagan Vihari, Indian actor

== Surname ==
- William Gagan (born 1981), American photojournalist

== See also ==
- GAGAN, GPS-aided GEO augmented navigation
- Gagan railway station, Pakistan
- Gagana, Russian folklore creature
- Gagana (film), a 1989 Indian film
- Gagan Rassmussen, the fictional antagonist played by Reece Shearsmith in the 2015 Doctor Who episode Sleep No More
