= Shirish (given name) =

Shirish or Shrish is an Indian given name that may refer to

- Shirish Atre-Pai (born 1929), Indian social worker
- Shirish Baban Deo, Senior official of the Indian Air Force
- Shrish Chandra Dikshit (1926–2014), Indian politician
- Shirish Hiralal Chaudhari, Indian politician
- Shirish Kanekar, Marathi writer, stage performer, and journalist
- Shirish Korde (born 1945), Ugandan composer of Indian origin
- Shirish Kunder (born 1973), Indian filmmaker
- Shirish Panchal (born 1943), Indian critic and editor
- Shirish B Patel (born 1932), Indian civil engineer and businessman
- Shirish Saraf, Indian businessman
- Shirish Sharavanan, Indian actor
- Shirish Srivastava (born 1963), Indian cricketer
