= Sunil Joshi (Delhi cricketer) =

Indian cricketer (born 1977)

Personal information
- Born: 14 November 1977 (age 48); Delhi, India
- Source: Cricinfo, 9 April 2016

Sunil Joshi (born 14 November 1977) is an Indian former cricketer. He played one first-class match and two List A matches for Delhi in 1999/00.

== See also ==
- List of Delhi cricketers
