= Sunny Sehrawat =

Indian cricketer (born 1990)

Personal information
- Born: 17 September 1990 (age 36); Delhi, India
- Source: Cricinfo, 10 April 2016

Sunny Sehrawat (born 17 September 1990) is an Indian former cricketer. He played one first-class match for Delhi in 2011.

== See also ==
- List of Delhi cricketers
