= Sandeep Angurala =

Indian cricketer (born 1975)

Personal information
- Born: 27 November 1975 (age 50); Delhi, India
- Source: Cricinfo, 7 April 2016

Sandeep Angurala (born 27 November 1975) is an Indian former cricketer. He played thirteen first-class matches for Delhi between 1994 and 2001.

== See also ==
- List of Delhi cricketers
