= Edward Jackson (Delhi cricketer) =

Indian cricketer (1922–2009)

Personal information
- Full name: Edward Oliver Jackson
- Born: 3 December 1922; Calcutta, India
- Died: 5 October 2009 (aged 86); London, England
- Source: ESPNcricinfo, 9 April 2016

Edward Jackson, CBE (3 December 1922 – 5 October 2009) was an Indian cricketer. He played one first-class match for Delhi in 1946/47.

Jackson died in London on 5 October 2009, at the age of 86.

== See also ==
- List of Delhi cricketers
