= Johnnie Johnson (RAF officer, born 1917) =

English cricketer

- Born: Frank Sydney Roland Johnson; 4 August 1917; Simla, India
- Died: 10 May 2009 (aged 91)
- Military career
- Allegiance: United Kingdom
- Branch: British Indian Army; Royal Air Force
- Service years: 1935–1974
- Rank: Air Vice-Marshal
- Commands: No. 113 Maintenance Unit RAF (1960–63)
- Conflicts: Second World War
- Awards: Companion of the Order of the Bath; Officer of the Order of the British Empire

Air Vice-Marshal Frank Sydney Roland "Johnnie" Johnson, CB, OBE (4 August 1917 – 10 May 2009) was a senior Royal Air Force (RAF) officer and English cricketer. He played first-class cricket for several teams between 1941 and 1947. Johnson joined the RAF in 1935 and, despite transferring to the British Indian Army for the early part of the Second World War, he spent 38 years in the RAF and left with the rank of air vice-marshal.

== See also ==
- List of Delhi cricketers
