= Rishit Saini =

Indian cricketer (born 1990)

Personal information
- Born: 22 October 1990 (age 36); Delhi, India
- Source: Cricinfo, 10 April 2016

Rishit Saini (born 22 October 1990) is an Indian former cricketer. He played one first-class match for Delhi in 2011.

== See also ==
- List of Delhi cricketers
