= Mahipetsinhji =

Indian cricketer (born 1930)

Personal information
- Born: 30 June 1930 (age 96)
- Source: ESPNcricinfo, 9 April 2016

Mahipetsinhji (born 30 June 1930) is an Indian former cricketer. He played first-class cricket for Delhi and Services between 1947 and 1960.

== See also ==
- List of Delhi cricketers
