= Harpreet Singh (cricketer, born 1967) =

Indian cricketer (born 1967)

Personal information
- Born: 29 November 1967 (age 58); Bonn, West Germany
- Source: ESPNcricinfo, 9 April 2016

Harpreet Singh (born 29 November 1967) is an Indian former cricketer. He played eleven first-class matches for Delhi between 1989 and 1994.

== See also ==
- List of Delhi cricketers
