= Saket Bhatia =

Indian cricketer (born 1978)

Personal information
- Born: 6 October 1978 (age 48); Delhi, India
- Source: Cricinfo, 7 April 2016

Saket Bhatia (born 6 October 1978) is an Indian former cricketer. He played first-class cricket for Railways and Rajasthan and List A cricket for Delhi.

== See also ==
- List of Delhi cricketers
