= Karun Dubey =

Indian cricketer (born 1955)

Personal information
- Born: 30 May 1955 (age 71); Delhi, India
- Source: ESPNcricinfo, 27 March 2016

Karun Dubey (born 30 May 1955) is an Indian former cricketer. He played first-class cricket for Bengal, Delhi and Orissa.

== See also ==
- List of Bengal cricketers
- List of Delhi cricketers
