= Vemulapally Arvind =

Indian cricketer (born 1971)

Personal information
- Born: 9 September 1971 (age 55); Vijayawada, India
- Source: Cricinfo, 7 April 2016

Vemulapally Arvind (born 9 September 1971) is an Indian former cricketer. He played first-class cricket for Delhi and Orissa.

== See also ==
- List of Delhi cricketers
