= Kartar Nath =

Indian cricketer (born 1969)

Personal information
- Born: 1 March 1969 (age 57); Jammu, India
- Source: ESPNcricinfo, 10 April 2016

Kartar Nath (born 1 March 1969) is an Indian former cricketer. He played nine first-class matches for Delhi between 1992 and 1997.

== See also ==
- List of Delhi cricketers
