= M. H. Maqsood =

Indian cricketer

Personal information
- Died: 19 February 1975
- Source: ESPNcricinfo, 9 April 2016

M. H. Maqsood (date of birth unknown, died 19 February 1975) was an Indian cricketer. He played seven first-class matches for Delhi between 1934 and 1945.

== See also ==
- List of Delhi cricketers
