= Gaurav Chhabra =

Indian cricketer (born 1987)

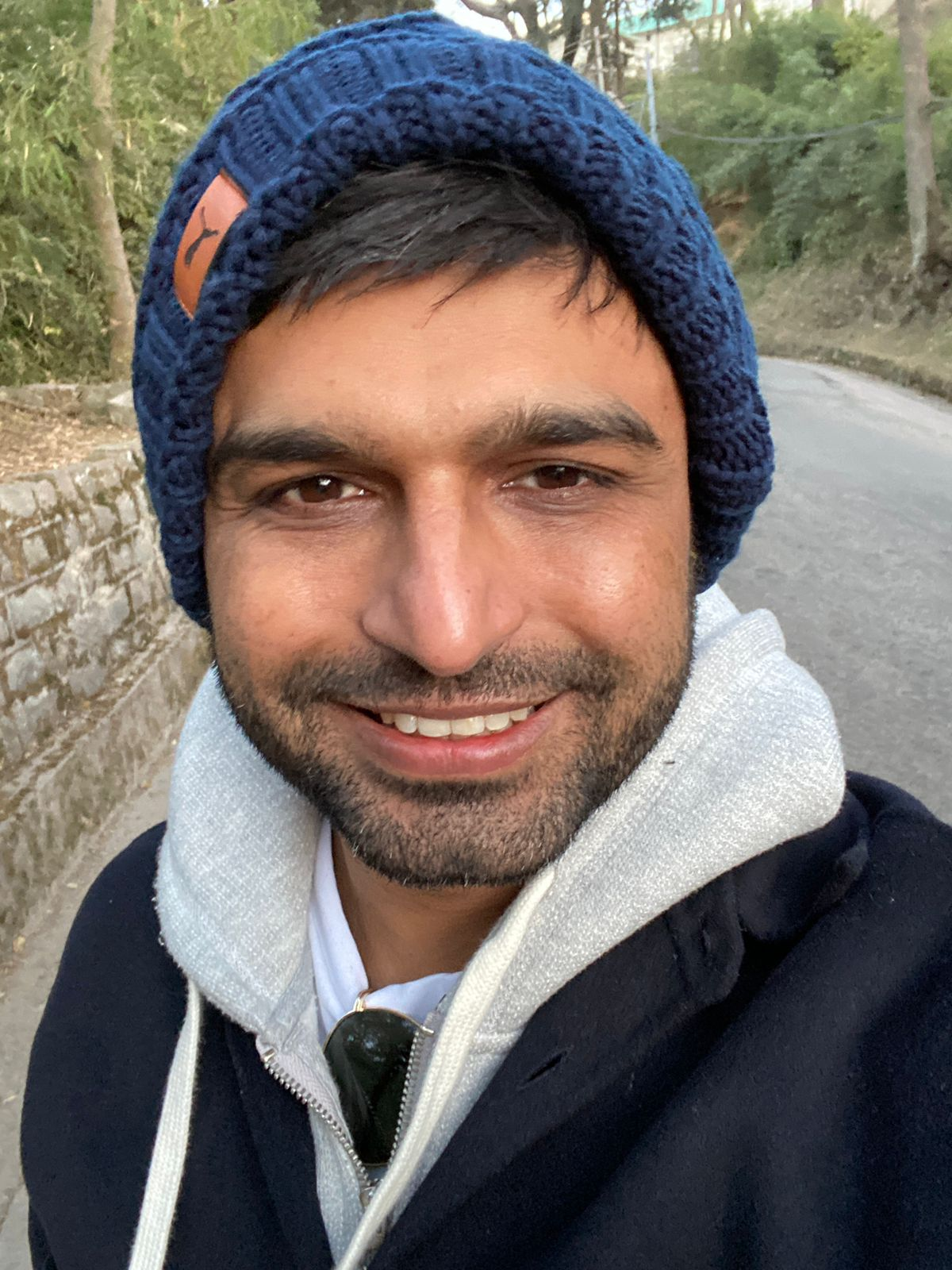

Personal information
- Born: 19 November 1987 (age 38); Delhi, India
- Source: ESPNcricinfo, 8 April 2016

Gaurav Chhabra (born 19 November 1987) is an Indian former cricketer. He played nine first-class matches for Delhi between 2008 and 2010.

== See also ==
- List of Delhi cricketers
