= Rajneesh Chopra =

Indian cricketer (born 1974)

Personal information
- Born: 30 June 1974 (age 52); Delhi, India
- Source: Cricinfo, 8 April 2016

Rajneesh Chopra (born 30 June 1974) is an Indian former cricketer. He played seven first-class matches for Delhi between 1995 and 1999.

== See also ==
- List of Delhi cricketers
