= Meghraj Dhannu =

Indian cricketer (born 1940)

Personal information
- Born: 25 October 1940 (age 86)
- Source: ESPNcricinfo, 8 April 2016

Meghraj Dhannu (born 25 October 1940) is an Indian former cricketer. He played for several domestic first-class cricket teams in India between 1958 and 1973.

== See also ==
- List of Delhi cricketers
