= Manoj Chauhan =

Indian cricketer (born 1992)

Personal information
- Born: 10 October 1992 (age 34); Delhi, India
- Source: ESPNcricinfo, 8 April 2016

Manoj Chauhan (born 10 October 1992) is an Indian former cricketer. He played six first-class matches for Delhi between 2010 and 2014.

== See also ==
- List of Delhi cricketers
