= Kapil Yadav =

Indian cricketer (born 1987)

Personal information
- Born: 17 March 1987 (age 39); Delhi, India
- Source: ESPNcricinfo, 12 April 2016

Kapil Yadav (born 17 March 1987) is an Indian former cricketer. He played two first-class matches for Delhi between 2008 and 2010.

== See also ==
- List of Delhi cricketers
