= Geoffrey Bull (cricketer) =

English cricketer

Personal information
- Born: 1 August 1912
- Died: 20 January 1997 (aged 84); Ipswich, England
- Source: ESPNcricinfo, 7 April 2016

Geoffrey Bull (1 August 1912 – 20 January 1997) was an English cricketer. He played first-class cricket for Delhi and Northern India between 1935 and 1942.

== See also ==
- List of Delhi cricketers
