= Vijay Bhushan =

Indian cricketer (born 1939)

Personal information
- Born: 23 September 1939 (age 87); Delhi, India
- Source: Cricinfo, 7 April 2016

Vijay Bhushan (born 23 September 1939) is an Indian former cricketer. He played first-class cricket for Delhi and Services between 1960 and 1974.

== See also ==
- List of Delhi cricketers
