= Pururaj Singh =

Indian cricketer (born 1980)

Personal information
- Born: 24 December 1980 (age 45); Delhi, India
- Source: Cricinfo, 10 April 2016

Pururaj Singh (born 24 December 1980) is an Indian former cricketer. He played two first-class matches for Delhi in 2003.

== See also ==
- List of Delhi cricketers
