= Sukhvinder Singh (cricketer) =

Indian cricketer (born 1967)

Personal information
- Born: 23 February 1967 (age 59); Jullundur, India
- Source: Cricinfo, 11 April 2016

Sukhvinder Singh (born 23 February 1967) is an Indian former cricketer. He played first-class cricket for Assam and Delhi between 1986 and 2005.

== See also ==
- List of Delhi cricketers
