= Dikshit =

Dikshit (ISO: Dīkṣit, pronounced [d̪iːkʂɪt̪]; also spelled as Dixit, Diksha, or Dikshitar) is traditionally an Indian family name.

== Origin ==
The word is an adjectival form of the Sanskrit word diksha, meaning provider of knowledge. Dikshita in Sanskrit derives itself as a person involved in scientific studies, and literally translates as "one who has received initiation or one who is initiated". It may also be used to mean one who prepares boys for the performance of religious duties. Historically, the surname has been usually associated with professions related to knowledge, generally used among teachers and scholars. The word dixit means the one who has been initiated.

== Notable individuals ==
=== Dixit ===
- Avinash Dixit, Indian-American economist originally of Indian nationality
- Jyotindra Nath Dixit, former National Security Advisor of India who belongs to Nair community
- Kamal Mani Dixit, Nepali writer
- Kanak Mani Dixit, Nepali publisher, editor and writer
- Madan Mani Dixit, Nepali writer
- Madhuri Dixit, Indian Bollywood actress
- Raghu Dixit, Indian singer-songwriter, producer, and film score composer who is the frontman for the Raghu Dixit Project, a multilingual folk music band.
- Rajiv Dixit, Indian social activist
- Rahul Dixit, telecommunications engineer, IEEE Fellow
- Vishva Dixit, biomedical scientist

=== Dikshit ===
- Anurag Dikshit, software developer for PartyGaming and convicted felon
- Sandeep Dikshit, an INC member of Lok Sabha from East Delhi
- Sheila Dikshit, former Chief Minister of Delhi
- Uma Shankar Dikshit, Indian politician
- Hriday Narayan Dikshit, Indian politician from Unnao, former minister, 5 times M.L.A., 1 time MLC, former speaker of Uttar Pradesh Legislative Assembly

=== Dikshita ===
- Appayya Dikshita (1520–1593), performer of yajñas, a practitioner of the Advaita Vedanta school of Hindu philosophy with a focus on Shiva or Siva Advaita
- Govinda Dikshita, minister of three successive Nayaks of Thanjavur, who ruled the region of Thanjavur in Southern India in the 16th and 17th centuries CE
- Bhaṭṭoji Dīkṣita (also spelled Dikshita), 17th-century Maharashtrian Sanskrit grammarian

=== Dikshitar ===
- Muthuswami Dikshitar, one of the Carnatic Music Trinity
- Subbarama Dikshitar (1839–1906), Carnatic music composer
- Ramaswami Dikshitar, Carnatic composer and father of Muthuswami Dikshitar
