= Pradeep Kochar =

Indian cricketer (born 1959)

Personal information
- Born: 6 May 1959 (age 67); Delhi, India
- Source: Cricinfo, 9 April 2016

Pradeep Kochar (born 6 May 1959) is an Indian former cricketer. He played first-class cricket for Assam and Delhi between 1980 and 1989.

== See also ==
- List of Delhi cricketers
