= Praveen Thapur =

Indian cricketer (born 1972)

Personal information
- Born: 9 September 1972 (age 54); Faridabad, India
- Source: Cricinfo, 12 April 2016

Praveen Thapur (born 9 September 1972) is an Indian former cricketer. He played one first-class match for Delhi in 1994/95.

== See also ==
- List of Delhi cricketers
