= Pratap Chauhan =

Indian cricketer (born 1935)

Personal information
- Born: 21 June 1935 (age 91); Delhi, India
- Source: Cricinfo, 8 April 2016

Pratap Chauhan (born 21 June 1935) is an Indian former cricketer. He played first-class cricket for Delhi and Southern Punjab between 1958 and 1966.

== See also ==
- List of Delhi cricketers
