= Harendra Chaudhary =

Indian cricketer (born 1976)

Personal information
- Born: 12 March 1976 (age 50); Delhi, India
- Source: ESPNcricinfo, 8 April 2016

Harendra Chaudhary (born 12 March 1976) is an Indian former cricketer. He played seven first-class matches for Delhi between 1998 and 2003.

== See also ==
- List of Delhi cricketers
