= Ragubhir Saini =

Indian cricketer (born 1939)

Personal information
- Born: 8 September 1939 (age 87); Delhi, India
- Source: Cricinfo, 10 April 2016

Ragubhir Saini (born 8 September 1939) is an Indian former cricketer. He played 26 first-class matches for Delhi between 1959 and 1969.

== See also ==
- List of Delhi cricketers
