= Radhey Gupta =

Indian cricketer (born 1978)

Personal information
- Full name: Radhey Shyam Gupta
- Born: 8 October 1978 (age 48); Delhi, India
- Source: Cricinfo, 9 April 2016

Radhey Gupta (born 8 October 1978) is an Indian former cricketer. He played three first-class matches for Delhi in 2001/02.

== See also ==
- List of Delhi cricketers
