= Sunil Dev =

Indian cricketer (1948–2023)

Personal information
- Born: 30 May 1948; Delhi, India
- Died: 3 August 2023 (aged 75)

Sunil Dev (30 May 1948 – 3 August 2023) was an Indian cricketer. He played one first-class match for Delhi in 1969/70.

Dev died on 3 August 2023, at the age of 75.

== See also ==
- List of Delhi cricketers
