= Kunal Lal =

Indian cricketer (born 1984)

Personal information
- Born: 17 January 1984 (age 42); Ghaziabad, India
- Source: ESPNcricinfo, 9 April 2016

Kunal Lal (born 17 January 1984) is an Indian former cricketer. He played thirteen first-class matches for Delhi between 2003 and 2007.

== See also ==
- List of Delhi cricketers
