= 1961–62 Ranji Trophy =

Indian cricket tournament

- The Ranji Trophy
- Administrator(s): BCCI
- Cricket format: First-class
- Tournament format(s): Knockout
- Champions: Bombay (13th title)
- Participants: 23
- Most runs: Harcharan Singh (Southern Punjab) (495)
- Most wickets: P. Sitaram (Delhi) (40)

The 1961–62 Ranji Trophy was the 28th season of the Ranji Trophy. Bombay won the title defeating Rajasthan in the final.

== Highlights ==
- Prakash Bhandari scored a hundred in 60 minutes against Rajasthan in the semifinal which was then the fastest hundred in Ranji trophy.

== Group stage ==
=== South Zone ===
Team	Pld	W	L	D	T	NR	Pts	Q
Madras	3	2	0	1	0	0	22	2.170
Mysore	3	1	0	2	0	0	18	1.526
Hyderabad	3	0	1	2	0	0	5	0.619
Kerala	3	0	2	1	0	0	2	0.324

=== West Zone ===
Team	Pld	W	L	D	T	NR	Pts	Q
Bombay	4	3	0	1	0	0	33	2.464
Maharashtra	4	3	1	0	0	0	25	0.941
Baroda	4	1	2	1	0	0	13	1.150
Saurashtra	4	1	2	1	0	0	12	0.683
Gujarat	4	0	3	1	0	0	5	0.606

=== Central Zone ===
Team	Pld	W	L	D	T	NR	Pts	Q
Rajasthan	3	1	0	2	0	0	16	1.150
Uttar Pradesh	3	0	0	3	0	0	15	0.902
Vidarbha	3	0	1	2	0	0	12	1.059
Madhya Pradesh	3	0	0	3	0	0	11	0.914

=== East Zone ===
Team	Pld	W	L	D	T	NR	Pts	Q
Bengal	3	2	0	1	0	0	24	2.908
Assam	3	0	0	3	0	0	13	0.993
Bihar	3	1	1	1	0	0	12	0.773
Orissa	3	0	2	1	0	0	3	0.452

=== North Zone ===
Team	Pld	W	L	D	T	NR	Pts	Q
Delhi	5	4	0	1	0	0	41	1.941
Railways	5	4	1	0	0	0	36	1.842
Services	5	1	1	3	0	0	23	1.080
Southern Punjab	5	1	2	2	0	0	17	1.047
Northern Punjab	5	1	2	2	0	0	17	0.913
Jammu & Kashmir	5	0	5	0	0	0	0	0.193

== Knockout stage ==
Quarter-finals
26 Jan 1962 – Madras
Madras	182 & 203
Delhi	385 & 136

Semi-finals
17 Feb 1962 – Delhi
Delhi	149 & 267
Bombay	290 & 116/2
16 Feb 1962 – Udaipur
Rajasthan	392 & 195/5
Bengal	292 & 291/3d

Final
20 Mar 1962 – Bombay
Bombay	539
Rajasthan	157 & 95

=== Final ===
20–22 Mar 1962
Scorecard

Bombay (H)	v	Rajasthan
539 (140.2 overs); Ajit Wadekar 235, G. S. Ramchand 100; Raj Singh 4/86		157 (62.4 overs); Suryaveer Singh 32; Sharad Diwadkar 5/68
		95 (34.4 overs, follow on); Hanumant Singh 48*; G. S. Ramchand 2/16

Bombay won by an innings and 287 runs
Brabourne Stadium, Bombay
Umpires: Sukken Bhattacharya and Narayan Sane

- Bombay won the toss and elected to bat

== Scorecards and averages ==
- CricketArchive
