= Rajeswar Vats =

Indian cricketer (born 1953)

Personal information
- Born: 11 October 1953 (age 73); Delhi, India
- Source: Cricinfo, 12 April 2016

Rajeswar Vats (born 11 October 1953) is an Indian former cricketer. He played first-class cricket for Delhi and Railways between 1973 and 1985.

== See also ==
- List of Delhi cricketers
