= Prem Bhatia (cricketer) =

Indian cricketer (1940–2018)

Personal information
- Full name: Prem Bhatia
- Born: 17 January 1940; Delhi, India
- Died: 13 March 2018 (aged 78); Delhi, India
- Batting: Right-handed
- Bowling: Right-arm off break

Domestic team information
- Years: Team
- 1958–1969: Delhi
- 1973–1974: Gujarat
- 1984–1985: North Zone

Career statistics
| Competition | First-class | List A |
|---|---|---|
| Matches | 56 | 1 |
| Runs scored | 2,548 | – |
| Batting average | 30.69 | – |
| 100s/50s | 6/13 | – |
| Top score | 151 | – |
| Balls bowled | 2,538 | – |
| Wickets | 36 | – |
| Bowling average | 30.88 | – |
| 5 wickets in innings | 0 | – |
| 10 wickets in match | 0 | – |
| Best bowling | 3/14 | – |
| Catches/stumpings | 38/- | 0/– |
- Source: CricketArchive, 29 March 2021

Prem Bhatia (17 January 1940 – 13 March 2018) was an Indian cricketer. He played 55 first-class matches for Delhi between 1958 and 1969, scoring more than 2,500 runs. Bhatia also made 1 first-class appearance for Gujarat against Baroda in the 1973–74 Ranji Trophy, while also making 1 List A appearance for North Zone against South Zone in the 1984–85 Deodhar Trophy.

He is perhaps best known for becoming the first twelfth man to bat in a first-class match, when asked to bat in place of former India captain Lala Amarnath in the first Irani Trophy match between the Rest of India and Bombay on 18 March 1960. Bhatia batted in both innings, scoring 22 in the first and 50 in the second, while Amarnath bowled and fielded.

== See also ==
- List of Delhi cricketers
- List of Gujarat cricketers
- List of North Zone cricketers
