= Turab Ali (cricketer) =

Indian cricketer (1920–2009)

Personal information
- Full name: Agha Turab Ali
- Born: 8 February 1920; Delhi, India
- Died: 28 June 2009; Lahore, Pakistan
- Source: Cricinfo, 12 April 2016

Agha Turab Ali (1920–2009) was an Indian cricketer. He played first-class cricket for Delhi and Punjab between 1945 and 1958. He also played the Ranji trophy and is in the list of top scorers. Later, he joined Delhi Gymkhana Club and served as a head coach and selector there. He died in 2009.

== See also ==
- List of Delhi cricketers
