= Vishal Sharma (Delhi cricketer) =

Indian cricketer (born 1978)

Personal information
- Born: 20 September 1978 (age 48); Delhi, India
- Source: Cricinfo, 11 April 2016

Vishal Sharma (born 20 September 1978) is an Indian former cricketer. He played one first-class match for Delhi in 1999/00.

== See also ==
- List of Delhi cricketers
