= Dharshan Kanjania =

Indian cricketer (born 1989)

Personal information
- Born: 15 October 1989 (age 37); Delhi, India
- Source: ESPNcricinfo, 9 April 2016

Dharshan Kanjania (born 15 October 1989) is an Indian former cricketer. He played one first-class match for Delhi in 2009.

== See also ==
- List of Delhi cricketers
