= Raju Sethi =

Indian cricketer (born 1962)

Personal information
- Born: 22 June 1962 (age 64); Amritsar, India
- Source: Cricinfo, 10 April 2016

Raju Sethi (born 22 June 1962) is an Indian former cricketer. He played thirteen first-class matches for Delhi between 1978 and 1984.

== See also ==
- List of Delhi cricketers
