= Arun Singh (cricketer) =

Indian cricketer (born 1975)

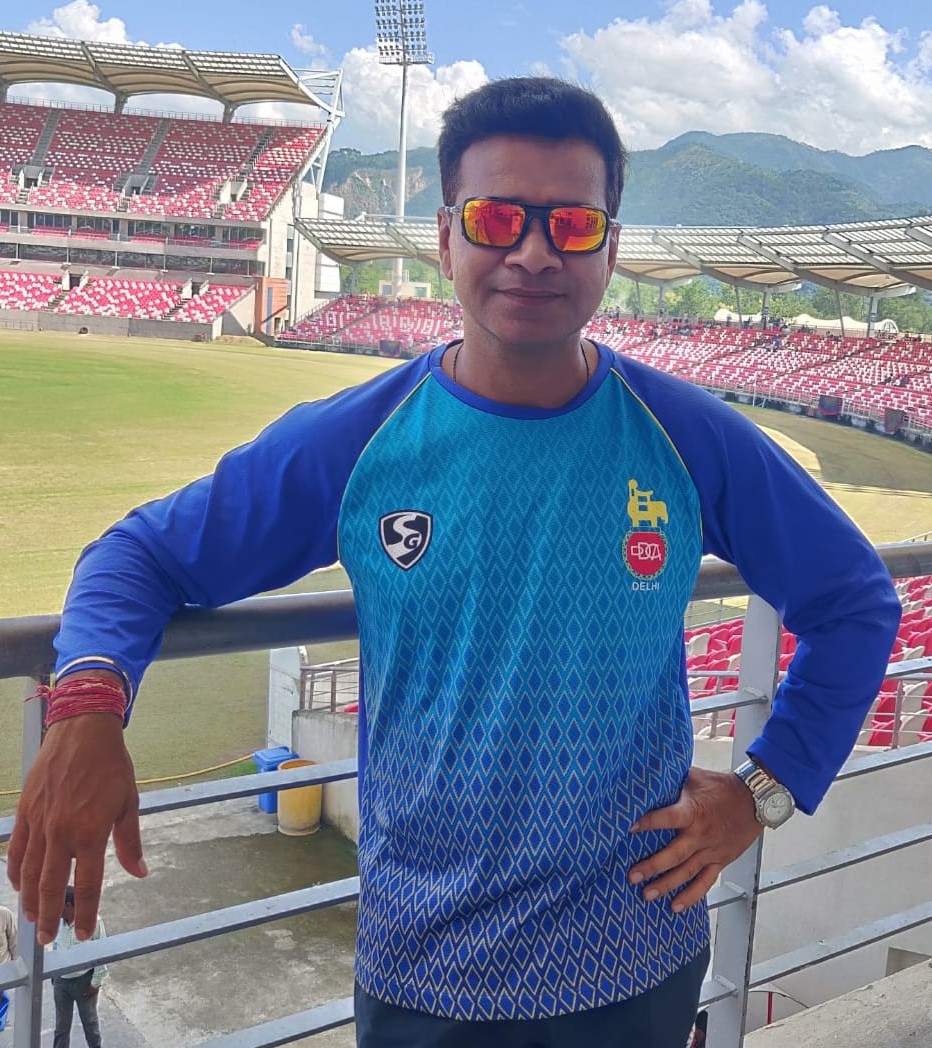

Personal information
- Born: 16 November 1975 (age 50); Delhi, India
- Source: ESPNcricinfo, 7 April 2016

Arun Singh (born 16 November 1975) is an Indian former cricketer and coach. He played thirteen first-class matches for Delhi between 1998 and 2003.

He is an NCA Level – A Coach and given his services as a, Chairman Junior Selection Committee in Uttarakhand and Coached Delhi Under-16 Cricket Team BCCI.

Currently, giving his services as a personal coach.

== See also ==
- List of Delhi cricketers
