= Yogesh Sachdeva =

Indian cricketer (born 1982)

Personal information
- Born: 31 July 1982 (age 44); Delhi, India
- Source: Cricinfo, 10 April 2016

Yogesh Sachdeva (born 31 July 1982) is an Indian former cricketer. He played three first-class matches for Delhi between 2005 and 2006.

== See also ==
- List of Delhi cricketers
