= Gyaneshwar Prasad Thapliyal =

Indian cricketer (1938–2007)

Personal information
- Full name: Gyaneshwar Prasad Thapliyal
- Born: 19 October 1938; Simla, Punjab, India
- Died: 25 November 2007 (aged 69); Mumbai, Maharashtra, India
- Nickname: Gyane
- Batting: Right-handed
- Bowling: Right-arm off break
- Role: All-rounder

Domestic team information
- Years: Team
- 1958/59-1973/74: Delhi
- 1966/67: Southern Punjab

Career statistics
Competition	FC
Matches	68
Runs scored	2,297
Batting average	25.24
100s/50s	4/12
Top score	171
Balls bowled	5,386
Wickets	98
Bowling average	19.87
5 wickets in innings	3
10 wickets in match	2
Best bowling	9/34
Catches/stumpings	70/–
- Source: ESPNcricinfo, 7 January 2016

Gyaneshwar Prasad Thapliyal (19 October 1938 – 25 November 2007) was an Indian first-class cricketer who played for Delhi cricket team and Southern Punjab. He was the first cricketer from North Zone to take nine wickets in an innings. After retirement, he became a selector for Delhi as well as manager of North Zone team.

== Career ==
During his playing career, Thapliyal was an all-rounder who batted right-handed and bowled right-arm off break. He represented Delhi between 1958/59 and 1973/74, and played one season for Southern Punjab in 1966/67. His career best figures of 9/34 came in the 1961–62 Ranji Trophy against Jammu and Kashmir. With this haul, he became the first player from North Zone to take nine wickets in an innings. Thapliyal appeared in 68 first-class matches, scored more than 2000 runs and picked 98 wickets.

After retirement, he became a Ranji selector for Delhi. He also worked as manager for state and zonal teams. He was the manager of the North Zone team for Deodhar Trophy when Kapil Dev was its captain.

== Personal life ==
Thapliyal died on 25 November 2007 in Nanavati Hospital in Mumbai.

Gyaneshwar's brother Rajeshwar Prasad Thapliyal was also a cricketer. A leg spinner, Rajeshwar was in the Delhi Ranji squad in 1962–64 and 1963–64 seasons, but did not make it into the playing eleven. He died in 2013 at the age of 68 after a brief illness.
