= Satyendra Kuckreja =

Indian cricketer (born 1934)

Personal information
- Full name: Satyendra Nath Kuckreja
- Born: 28 October 1934 (age 92); Delhi, British India
- Source: Cricinfo, 28 March 2016

Satyendra Kuckreja (born 28 October 1934) is an Indian former cricketer. He played first-class cricket for Bengal, Delhi and Jharkhand.

== See also ==
- List of Bengal cricketers
- List of Delhi cricketers
