= Mukesh Diwan =

Indian cricketer (born 1976)

Personal information
- Born: 15 June 1976 (age 50); Delhi, India
- Source: ESPNcricinfo, 8 April 2016

Mukesh Diwan (born 15 June 1976) is an Indian former cricketer. He played two first-class matches for Delhi in 2005.

== See also ==
- List of Delhi cricketers
