= Praveen Kashyap =

Indian cricketer (born 1953)

Personal information
- Born: 21 April 1953 (age 73)
- Source: Cricinfo, 9 April 2016

Praveen Kashyap (born 21 April 1953) is an Indian former cricketer. He played first-class cricket for Delhi and Railways between 1976 and 1982.

== See also ==
- List of Delhi cricketers
