= Ranjan Gupta =

Indian cricketer (born 1980)

Personal information
- Born: 11 December 1980 (age 45); Delhi, India
- Source: Cricinfo, 8 April 2016

Ranjan Gupta (born 11 December 1980) is an Indian former cricketer. He played first-class cricket for Delhi and Haryana between 2000 and 2005.

== See also ==
- List of Delhi cricketers
