= Shawej Khan =

Indian cricketer (born 1986)

Personal information
- Born: 19 November 1986 (age 39); Delhi, India
- Source: Cricinfo, 11 April 2016

Shawej Khan (born 19 November 1986) is an Indian former cricketer. He played one Twenty20 cricket match for Delhi in 2011.

== See also ==
- List of Delhi cricketers
