= Oniel Wilson =

Indian cricketer

Personal information
- Born: 27 April 1971 (age 55); Delhi, India
- Source: ESPNcricinfo, 12 April 2016

Oniel Wilson (born 27 April 1971) is an Indian former cricketer. He played two first-class matches for Delhi between 1990 and 1997.

== See also ==
- List of Delhi cricketers
