= Praveen Oberoi =

Indian cricketer (born 1953)

Personal information
- Born: 7 September 1953 (age 73); Delhi, India
- Source: Cricinfo, 10 April 2016

Praveen Oberoi (born 7 September 1953) is an Indian former cricketer. He played 29 first-class matches for Delhi between 1972 and 1981.

== See also ==
- List of Delhi cricketers
