= Sheetal Pathak =

Indian cricketer (born 1974)

Personal information
- Born: 23 March 1974 (age 52); Delhi, India
- Source: Cricinfo, 10 April 2016

Sheetal Pathak (born 23 March 1974) is an Indian former cricketer. He played four List A matches for Delhi in 1993/94.

== See also ==
- List of Delhi cricketers
