= Suhail Sharma =

Indian cricketer (born 1981)

Personal information
- Born: 10 October 1981 (age 45); Delhi, India
- Source: Cricinfo, 11 April 2016

Suhail Sharma (born 10 October 1981) is an Indian former cricketer. He played two first-class matches for Delhi between 2006 and 2007.

== See also ==
- List of Delhi cricketers
