= Rajesh Gehlot (cricketer) =

Indian cricketer (born 1976)

Personal information
- Born: 27 September 1976 (age 50); Delhi, India
- Source: Cricinfo, 9 April 2016

Rajesh Gehlot (born 27 September 1976) is an Indian former cricketer. He played five List A matches for Delhi between 1999 and 2001.

== See also ==
- List of Delhi cricketers
