= Gautam Vadhera =

Indian cricketer (born 1972)

Personal information
- Born: 1 October 1972 (age 54); Delhi, India
- Source: ESPNcricinfo, 12 April 2016

Gautam Vadhera (born 1 October 1972) is an Indian former cricketer. He played nine first-class matches for Delhi between 1992 and 1995.

== See also ==
- List of Delhi cricketers
