= Rajiv Rathore =

Indian cricketer (born 1974)

Personal information
- Born: 18 January 1974 (age 52); Delhi, India
- Source: Cricinfo, 10 April 2016

Rajiv Rathore (born 18 January 1974, also spelt Rajeev Rathore) is an Indian former cricketer. He played 17 List A matches for Delhi between 1998 and 2003.

== See also ==
- List of Delhi cricketers
