= Shankar Saini =

Indian cricketer (born 1964)

Personal information
- Born: 8 July 1964 (age 62); Delhi, India
- Source: Cricinfo, 10 April 2016

Shankar Saini (born 8 July 1964) is an Indian former cricketer. He played twenty first-class matches for Delhi between 1986 and 1991.

== See also ==
- List of Delhi cricketers
