= Devendra Jain =

Indian cricketer (born 1962)

Personal information
- Born: 30 July 1962 (age 64); Delhi, India
- Source: ESPNcricinfo, 9 April 2016

Devendra Jain (born 30 July 1962) is an Indian former cricketer. He played one first-class match for Delhi in 1984/85.

== See also ==
- List of Delhi cricketers
