= 1996–97 Ranji Trophy =

- The Ranji Trophy, which the winners get.
- Administrator: BCCI
- Cricket format: First-class cricket
- Tournament format(s): League and knockout
- Champions: Mumbai (33rd title)
- Participants: 27
- Most runs: Raman Lamba (Delhi) (1034)
- Most wickets: Rajesh Chauhan (Madhya Pradesh) (52)

The 1996–97 Ranji Trophy was the 63rd season of the Ranji Trophy. Bombay won the final against Delhi on first innings lead. This match, held at Gwalior, was the first day-night first class match in India.

Raman Lamba who scored 1034 and Ajay Sharma, 1033, bettered the previous record for most runs in a season.

== Knockout Matches ==
=== Quarterfinal 1 ===
17–21 March 1997
Scorecard

Madhya Pradesh	v	Bengal
464 (145.2 overs); Amay Khurasiya 209; Utpal Chatterjee 3/110 (45 overs)		420 (149.1); Rohan Gavaskar 109; Rajesh Chauhan 3/121 (49 overs)
425/5 d (136 overs); Jai P Yadav 108; Rohan Gavaskar 2/51 (20 overs)		54/2 (23 overs); Shibsagar Singh 86; Manish Babulal Majithia 2/16 (9 overs)

Match drawn
Maharani Usharaje Trust Cricket Ground, Indore, Indore
Umpires: R Radhakrishnan and KG Lakshminarayana

- Madhya Pradesh won the toss and elected to bat.
- Madhya Pradesh advanced to the semi-final

=== Quarterfinal 2 ===
17–21 March 1997
Scorecard

Hyderabad	v	Maharashtra
226 (96.4 overs); V Pratap 76; Milind Shripath Kulkarni 4/71 (24.4 overs)		287 (119.3); Indrajeet Kamtekar 53; Venkatapathy Raju 3/54 (31 overs)
230 (76.3 overs); Narender Pal Singh 62; Iqbal Siddiqui 4/46 (11.3 overs)		172/3 (35.3 overs); Surendra Bhave 86; Ramakrishnan Sridhar 2/42 (7 overs)

Maharashtra won by 7 wickets
Nehru Stadium, Pune
Umpires: SK Bansal and MS Mahal

- Hyderabad won the toss and elected to bat.

=== Semifinal 1 ===
27–31 March 1997
Scorecard

Madhya Pradesh	v	Mumbai
369 (153.3 overs); Manish Majithia 75; Nilesh Kulkarni 5/81 (41 overs)		532 (230.5); Amol Mazumdar 125; Rajesh Chauhan 6/191(93.5 overs)
291/7 d (101.5 overs); Abbas Ali 102; Sairaj Bahutule 4/75 (37.5 overs)		25/0 (11 overs); Wasim Jaffer 16; Sunil Lahore 0/12 (5 overs)

Match drawn
Maharani Usharaje Trust Cricket Ground, Indore
Umpires: S Lakshmanan and P Bhanu Prakash

- Madhya Pradesh won the toss and elected to bat.
- Mumbai advanced to the Ranji Trophy Final

=== Semifinal 2 ===
27–31 March 1997
Scorecard

Delhi	v	Maharashtra
656 (213.4 overs); Raman Lamba 192; Sameer Inamdar 4/163 (40 overs)		524 (143.1); Hrishikesh Kanitkar 174; Robin Singh 3/168 (35 overs)
264/2 d (67 overs); Raman Lamba 101; Shantanu Sugwekar 2/41 (12 overs)

Match drawn
Nehru Stadium, Pune
Umpires: LM Thyagrajan and TN Ravi

- Delhi won the toss and elected to bat.
- Delhi advanced to the Ranji Trophy Final

== Final ==
5–9 April 1997
Scorecard

Mumbai	v	Delhi
630 (202.2 overs); Jatin Paranjpe 111, Amol Muzumdar 144; Feroze Ghayas 2/116		559 (219.1 overs); Ashu Dani 178, Ajay Sharma 176; Nilesh Kulkarni 4/143

Mumbai won on first innings lead
Captain Roop Singh Stadium, Gwalior
Umpires: V. K. Ramaswamy, Subroto Porel

- Mumbai won the toss and decided to bat
- Day-night match

== Scorecards and averages ==
- CricketArchive
