= Saurabh Passi =

Indian cricketer (born 1989)

Personal information
- Born: 6 October 1989 (age 37); Delhi, India
- Source: Cricinfo, 10 April 2016

Saurabh Passi (born 6 October 1989) is an Indian former cricketer. He played one Twenty20 cricket match for Delhi in 2014.

== See also ==
- List of Delhi cricketers
