= Deepak Sharma (cricketer, born 1960) =

Indian cricketer (born 1960)

Personal information
- Born: 11 February 1960 (age 66); Delhi, India
- Source: ESPNcricinfo, 10 April 2016

Deepak Sharma (born 11 February 1960) is an Indian former cricketer. He played first-class cricket for Delhi and Haryana between 1981 and 1993.

== See also ==
- List of Delhi cricketers
