= Kuldeep Rawat =

Indian cricketer (born 1984)

Personal information
- Born: 16 October 1984 (age 42); Uttarakhand, India
- Source: ESPNcricinfo, 10 April 2016

Kuldeep Rawat (born 16 October 1984) is an Indian former cricketer. He played five first-class matches for Delhi between 2002 and 2011.

== See also ==
- List of Delhi cricketers
