= Tajammul Hussain =

Indian cricketer (1909–1971)

Personal information
- Born: 18 December 1909; Delhi, India
- Died: 18 August 1971 (aged 61); Karachi, Pakistan
- Source: Cricinfo, 12 April 2016

Tajammul Hussain (18 December 1909 – 18 August 1971) was an Indian cricketer. He played three first-class matches for Delhi between 1934 and 1940.

== See also ==
- List of Delhi cricketers
