= Rajesh Peter =

Indian cricketer (1959–1995)

Cricket information
- Batting: Right-handed
- Bowling: Right-arm medium

Career statistics
Competition	First-class	List A
Matches	13	1
Runs scored	253	3
Batting average	23.00	–
100s/50s	0/2	0/0
Top score	67*	3*
Balls bowled	802	60
Wickets	10	3
Bowling average	34.60	18.33
5 wickets in innings	0	0
10 wickets in match	0	0
Best bowling	3/47	3/55
Catches/stumpings	7/–	0/–
- Source: CricketArchive, 5 December 2022

Rajesh Peter (18 August 1959 – 16 November 1995) was an Indian first class cricketer who played for Delhi in the Ranji Trophy. A fast bowler, he played in the 1981-82 Trophy winning side. In the final against Karnataka, he contributed 67 not out with the bat in an unbroken ninth wicket partnership of 118 with Rakesh Shukla, as Karnataka chased down 706 for a first innings lead on the sixth day of the match.

In 1996, he was found dead in his New Delhi flat in suspicious circumstances.
