= 1993–94 Ranji Trophy =

1993-94 Ranji Trophy
- The Ranji Trophy, which the winners get.
- Administrator: BCCI
- Cricket format: First-class cricket
- Tournament format(s): League and knockout
- Champions: Bombay (31st title)
- Participants: 27
- Most runs: M. V. Sridhar (Hyderabad) (757)
- Most wickets: Pradeep Jain (Haryana) (46)

The 1993–94 Ranji Trophy was the 60th season of the Ranji Trophy. Bombay defeated Bengal by 8 wickets in the final.

== Group stage ==
=== North Zone ===
Team	Pld	W	L	D	T	NR	Pts	RR
Punjab	5	4	1	0	0	0	26	3.253
Haryana	5	3	1	1	0	0	20	3.063
Delhi	5	3	0	2	0	0	18	2.899
Services	5	2	2	1	0	0	16	3.029
Jammu and Kashmir	5	0	4	1	0	0	2	3.158
Himachal Pradesh	5	0	4	1	0	0	0	2.897

=== Central Zone ===
Team	Pld	W	L	D	T	NR	Pts	RR
Rajasthan	4	2	2	0	0	0	14	3.207
Madhya Pradesh	4	2	1	1	0	0	14	2.781
Vidarbha	4	2	1	1	0	0	12	2.820
Railways	4	1	2	1	0	0	10	3.025
Uttar Pradesh	4	0	1	3	0	0	4	3.569

=== East Zone ===
Team	Pld	W	L	D	T	NR	Pts	RR
Bengal	4	4	0	0	0	0	24	3.600
Orissa	4	2	1	1	0	0	12	2.455
Assam	4	1	2	1	0	0	8	3.247
Bihar	4	1	1	2	0	0	8	2.626
Tripura	4	0	4	0	0	0	0	2.262

=== South Zone ===
Team	Pld	W	L	D	T	NR	Pts	RR
Hyderabad	5	3	0	2	0	0	21	3.377
Karnataka	5	3	1	1	0	0	19	2.610
Tamil Nadu	5	2	1	2	0	0	16	2.584
Kerala	5	1	2	2	0	0	9	2.581
Andhra	5	0	2	3	0	0	3	2.250
Goa	5	0	3	2	0	0	0	2.337

=== West Zone ===
Team	Pld	W	L	D	T	NR	Pts	RR
Bombay	4	4	0	3	0	0	24	3.193
Baroda	4	1	1	2	0	0	10	2.835
Maharashtra	4	1	1	2	0	0	8	3.178
Saurashtra	4	0	2	2	0	0	2	2.887
Gujarat	4	0	2	2	0	0	2	2.543

== Knockout stage ==
Pre-Quarter-finals
12 Feb 1994 — Nagpur
Vidarbha	356& 131/5
Maharashtra (F)	535 & 350/2d
12 Feb 1994 — Indore
Madhya Pradesh	370 & 230/9
Orissa (F)	437 & 244
12 Feb 1994 — Bangalore
Karnataka	468
Assam	107 & 175
12 Feb 1994 — Faridabad
Haryana	291 & 225
Bombay	718
12 Feb 1994 — Calcutta
Bengal (F)	213 & 445/8
Delhi	178
12 Feb 1994 — Jaipur
Rajasthan	202 & 136
Hyderabad	272 & 233
12 Feb 1994 — Baroda
Baroda (F)	366 & 368
Tamil Nadu	268 & 97/4

Quarter-finals
26 Feb 1994 — Pune
Maharashtra (F)	645/9d & 175/7d
Orissa	398 & 33/3
26 Feb 1994 — Bangalore
Karnataka	406 & 305/5d
Bombay (F)	460 & 89/6
26 Feb 1994 — Calcutta
Bengal	392 & 79/1
Hyderabad	261 & 209
25 Feb 1994 — Baroda
Baroda (F)	592
Punjab	349 & 287/8

Semi-finals
12 Mar 1994 — Pune
Maharashtra	338
Bombay (F)	509 & 316/7
12 Mar 1994 — Calcutta
Bengal	278 & 98/2
Baroda	249 & 123

Finals
27 Mar 1994 — Bombay
Bombay	256 & 195/2
Bengal	193 & 257

(F) - Advanced to next round on First Innings Lead

=== Final ===
27–30 March 1994
Scorecard

Bengal	v	Bombay (H)
193 (71.2 overs); Arun Lal 62; Sairaj Bahutule 4/49		256 (93.2 overs); Amol Muzumdar 78; Utpal Chatterjee 7/71
257 (87.4 overs); Saurav Ganguly 88; Manish Patel 3/35		195/2 (77.5 overs); Sunil More 83*; Sagarmoy Sensharma 1/34

Bombay won by 8 wickets
Wankhede Stadium, Bombay
Umpires: S. K. Bansal, V. K. Ramaswamy

- Bengal won the toss and decided to bat

== Scorecards and averages ==
- CricketArchive
