= Harcharan Singh (cricketer) =

Indian cricketer (1938–2019)

Personal information
- Born: 15 August 1938
- Died: 8 October 2019 (aged 81)
- Source: ESPNcricinfo, 26 April 2021

Harcharan Singh (15 August 1938 – 8 October 2019) was an Indian cricketer. He played in 50 first-class matches from 1955/56 to 1968/69. He was the leading run-scorer in the 1961–62 Ranji Trophy, with 495 runs in five matches for Southern Punjab.

== See also ==
- List of Services cricketers
