= Hitesh Sharma (cricketer) =

Indian cricketer (born 1968)

Personal information
- Born: 30 April 1968 (age 58); Delhi, India
- Source: ESPNcricinfo, 11 April 2016

Hitesh Sharma (born 30 April 1968) is an Indian former cricketer. He played six first-class matches for Delhi between 1991 and 1994.

== See also ==
- List of Delhi cricketers
