= Sumeet Dogra =

Indian cricketer (born 1969)

Personal information
- Born: 29 November 1969 (age 56); Delhi, India
- Source: Cricinfo, 8 April 2016

Sumeet Dogra (born 29 November 1969) is an Indian former cricketer. He played first-class cricket for Delhi and Haryana between 1990 and 1998.

== See also ==
- List of Delhi cricketers
