= Pradeep Jain =

Indian cricketer and coach (born 1965)

Personal information
- Born: 22 May 1965 (age 61); Delhi, India
- Batting: Left-handed
- Bowling: Slow left-arm orthodox
- Role: Bowler

Domestic team information
- Years: Team
- 1986/87–1989/90: Delhi
- 1990/91–2000/01: Haryana

Career statistics
Competition	FC	List A
Matches	93	39
Runs scored	1,029	126
Batting average	14.49	12.60
100s/50s	0/2	0/0
Top score	57	30*
Balls bowled	20,769	2,089
Wickets	348	53
Bowling average	23.49	23.16
5 wickets in innings	21	0
10 wickets in match	5	n/a
Best bowling	8/67	4/51
Catches/stumpings	53/–	12/–
- Source: ESPNcricinfo, 17 January 2016

Pradeep Jain (born 22 May 1965) is an Indian former first-class cricketer and coach. He played for Delhi and Haryana between the 1986/87 and 2000/01 seasons. After retirement, he worked as a cricket coach.

== Career ==
Jain was a slow left-arm orthodox spinner who played for Delhi for four seasons from 1986/87 to 1989/90, before his 11-year stint with Haryana. He appeared in a total of 93 first-class and 39 List A matches, some of them for North Zone and Board President's XI. He had a successful time during his career with Haryana, finishing as the leading wicket-taker of the 1993–94 Ranji Trophy with 46 scalps at an average of 17.69 including six five-wicket hauls and two ten-wicket hauls. He was the fourth highest-wicket taker of 1996–97 Ranji Trophy in which he took 44 wickets at 19.61 a piece. In the following Ranji season, he finished third on the wicket-takers list with 44 wickets to his name.

After retiring, Jain took up the job of cricket coaching. In 2005, he became one of the coaches of the National Sports Club of India's newly started cricket academy. He also became one of the coaches of the Dronacharya Cricket Foundation in Delhi started by Gurcharan Singh.
