= Ramesh Dewan =

Indian cricketer (born 1938)

Personal information
- Full name: Ramesh C Dewan
- Born: 1 December 1938 (age 87); Khanewal, Punjab Province, British India
- Source: Cricinfo, 8 April 2016

Ramesh Dewan (born 1 December 1938) is an Indian former cricketer. He played for several domestic first-class cricket teams in India between 1958 and 1974.

== See also ==
- List of Delhi cricketers
