= Manu Nayyar =

Indian cricketer (born 1964)

Personal information
- Born: 9 May 1964 (age 62); Delhi, India
- Source: ESPNcricinfo, 10 April 2016

Manu Nayyar (born 9 May 1964) is an Indian former cricketer. He played 57 first-class matches for Delhi between 1986 and 1994. He is now working as a referee.

== See also ==
- List of Delhi cricketers
