= Satish Khanna =

Indian cricketer (born 1928)

Personal information
- Full name: Satish Kumar Khanna
- Born: 8 November 1928 (age 98); Lahore, British India
- Source: Cricinfo, 28 March 2016

Satish Khanna (born 8 November 1928) is an Indian former cricketer. He played first-class cricket for Bengal and Delhi.

== See also ==
- List of Bengal cricketers
- List of Delhi cricketers
