= Uday Joshi =

Indian cricketer (born 1944)

Personal information
- Full name: Udaykumar Chaganlal Joshi
- Born: 23 December 1944 (age 81); Rajkot, British Raj
- Batting: Right-handed
- Bowling: Right-arm off break

Domestic team information
- Years: Team
- 1970–1974: Sussex
- 1968/69–1979/80: Gujarat
- 1967/68: Railways (India)
- 1965/66–1982/83: Saurashtra

Career statistics
Competition	First-class	List A
Matches	186	18
Runs scored	2,287	57
Batting average	10.04	11.40
100s/50s	1/7	–/–
Top score	100*	19*
Balls bowled	38,978	681
Wickets	557	15
Bowling average	29.08	25.20
5 wickets in innings	34	–
10 wickets in match	3	–
Best bowling	6/33	4/22
Catches/stumpings	78/–	2/–
- Source: Cricinfo, 20 December 2013

Udaykumar Chaganlal Joshi (born 23 December 1944, in Rajkot) is an Indian former cricketer active from 1965 to 1983 who played for Sussex.

He appeared in 186 first-class matches as a right-handed batsman who bowled off breaks. He scored 2,287 runs with a highest score of 100 not out and took 557 wickets with a best performance of six for 33. He also played for South Shields CC in 1977 and probably minor county cricket for Durham CCC.

In 2012, Joshi was convicted of having sexually molested a 13-year-old boy in Northern Ireland in 1979 and was jailed for six years. He was also barred from working with children in the future. At the time of his conviction, Joshi was a 67-year-old married father of two.
