= Sanjay Gill =

Indian cricketer (born 1975)

Personal information
- Born: 29 June 1975 (age 51); Delhi, India
- Source: Cricinfo, 9 April 2016

Sanjay Gill (born 29 June 1975) is an Indian former cricketer. He played first-class cricket for Delhi and Rajasthan between 1999 and 2006. Ahead of the start of the 2006–07 Ranji Trophy, he was named as the player to watch in Rajasthan's squad.

== See also ==
- List of Delhi cricketers
