= Gagan Malik (cricketer) =

Indian cricketer (born 1976)

Personal information
- Born: 29 December 1976 (age 49); Delhi, India
- Source: ESPNcricinfo, 9 April 2016

Gagan Malik (born 29 December 1976) is an Indian former cricketer. He played one List A match for Delhi in 1999/00.

== See also ==
- List of Delhi cricketers
