= Pradeep Chawla =

Indian cricketer (born 1980)

Personal information
- Born: 19 October 1980 (age 46); Delhi, India
- Source: Cricinfo, 8 April 2016

Pradeep Chawla (born 19 October 1980) is an Indian former cricketer. He played 24 first-class matches for Delhi between 2000 and 2005.

His fielding position was Wicketkeeper

His batting style was right hand bat.

== See also ==
- List of Delhi cricketers
