= Varun Kumar (cricketer) =

Indian cricketer (born 1980)

Personal information
- Born: 4 June 1980 (age 46); Delhi, India
- Nickname: Veekay
- Batting: Right-handed
- Role: Wicket-keeper
- Source: Cricinfo, 9 April 2016

Varun Kumar (born 4 June 1980) is an Indian former cricketer. He played 21 first-class matches for Delhi between 2001 and 2008. After retirement from Cricket, He is now working as in BCCI Panel Match Referee.
