= Rohit Mehra (cricketer) =

Indian cricketer (born 1978)

Personal information
- Born: 27 December 1978 (age 47); Delhi, India
- Source: Cricinfo, 9 April 2016

Rohit Mehra (born 27 December 1978) is an Indian former cricketer. He played two first-class matches for Delhi between 1998 and 2000.

== See also ==
- List of Delhi cricketers
