= Narendra Chawla =

Indian politician

Narendra Kumar Chawla

Mayor of South Delhi Municipal Corporation
- In office April 2018 – 2022
- Succeeded by: Office merged into Municipal Corporation of Delhi

Leader of the House, South Delhi Municipal Corporation

Personal details
- Born: January 13, 1961 Delhi, India
- Party: Bharatiya Janata Party
- Spouse: Urmila Chawla
- Children: 2 daughters
- Occupation: Politician, businessman
- Known for: Mayor of South Delhi (2018)

Narendra Chawla (13 January 1961) also known as Narendra Kumar Chawla is an Indian politician from Delhi. He was a former mayor of South Delhi Municipal Corporation. He was elected unopposed as the mayor of South Delhi in April 2018. He was a councillor representing the Bharatiya Janata Party from Janakpuri West ward. He is also the leader of the house in the South MCD.

On 22 May 2022, East Delhi Municipal Corporation (EDMC), North Delhi Municipal Corporation (NDMC), and South Delhi Municipal Corporation (SDMC), the three civic bodies which had their own mayor, were unified again as the Municipal Corporation of Delhi. Raja Iqbal Singh became the mayor after BJP regained the power.

In June 2021, he was elected as a member of the Delhi Development Authority.

== Early life and education ==
Chawla is from Janakpuri, Delhi. He is the son of Sunder Lal Chawla. His mother's name is Raj Chawla. After schooling in Janakpuri, he completed his graduation in commerce in 1980 at Motilal Nehru College of Commerce which is affiliated with the University of Delhi. He married Urmila, a councilor from Janakpuri West, and together they have two daughters.
