= Varun Chawla =

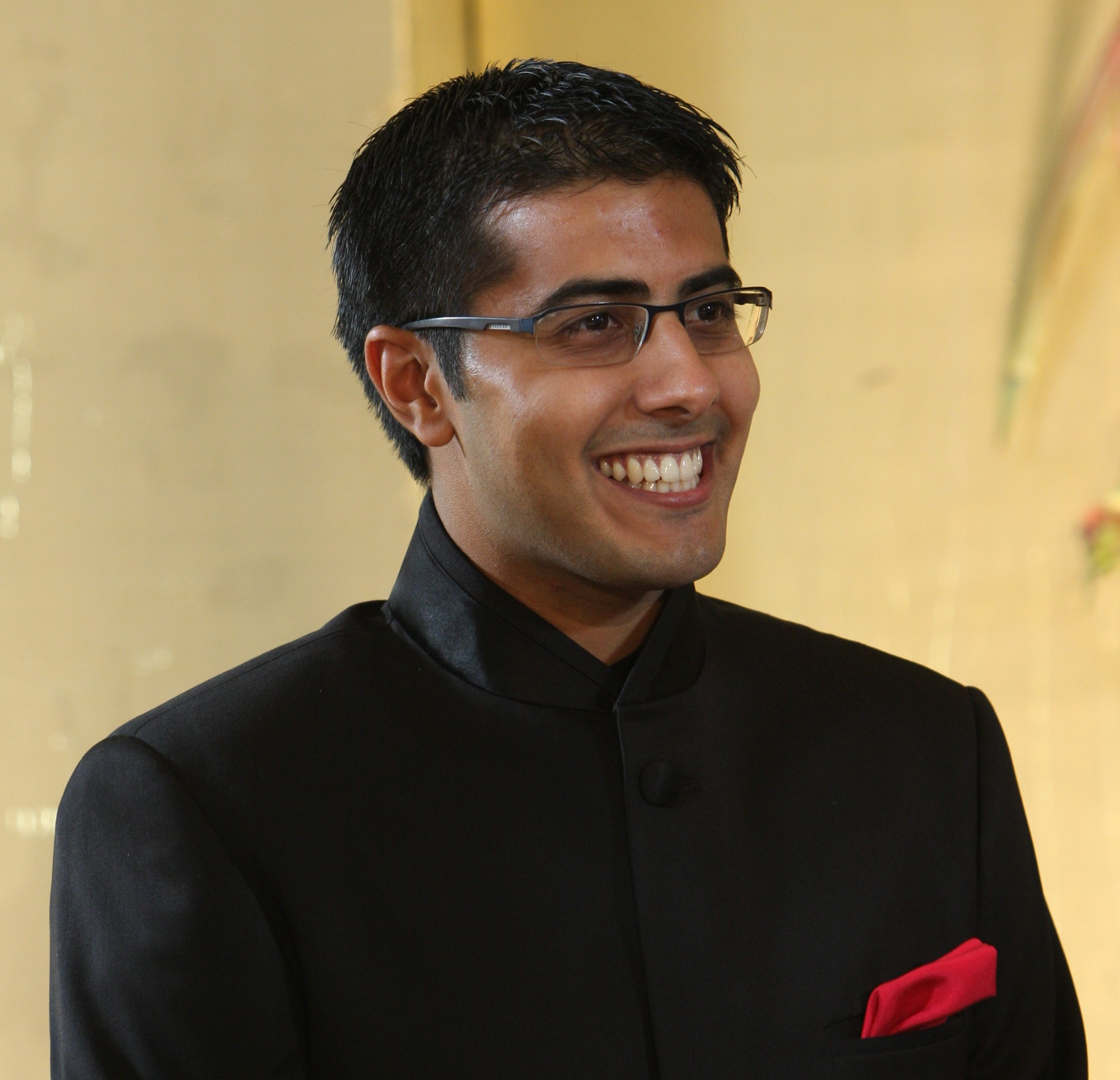
- Chawla in 2013
- Born: Varun Chawla
- Education: Cornell University (B.S. in Applied Economics & Management)
- Occupation: Entrepreneur
- Years active: 2004–present
- Known for: Co-founder of 91springboard; Founder of build3
- Notable work: 91springboard, build3
- Website: build3.org

Varun Chawla is an Indian entrepreneur and co-founder of 91springboard, one of the largest co-working and startup community platform in India. He is also a co-founder of build3, a Goa-based startup studio and accelerator that backs early stage startups focusing on social and environmental impact.

== Early life and education ==
Chawla graduated from Cornell University in 2002 with a degree in Applied Economics and Management. He also studied philosophy and architecture during his time at Cornell.

== Career ==
=== Investment Banking ===
After completing his studies, Chawla worked at Goldman Sachs in New York and Bengaluru.

=== Entrepreneurial Ventures ===
Chawla founded MyGuestHouse, a budget accommodation aggregator, in 2009. The company was acquired by MakeMyTrip in 2011.

=== 91springboard ===
In 2012, Chawla co-founded 91springboard with Anand Vemuri and Pranay Gupta.

"We offer this hybrid of accelerator, incubator and co working at one place, and this is unique unlike any other co working company." Varun told Forbes India.

The company expanded to multiple Indian cities and supported a large number of startups and businesses. Chawla stepped down from operational responsibilities at 91springboard in 2020.

=== build3 ===
After leaving 91springboard, Chawla co-founded build3, a startup studio and accelerator based in Goa that works with early-stage, impact-focused startups. The studio provides funding, mentorship, and operational support to founders from all sectors.

=== startup ecoashram ===
He is currently developing a 30 acre campus in the north of Goa intended as a residential ashram for entrepreneurs. As of August 2026, the construction of the ecoashram is still underway.

Varun's goal is to support 100,000 founders across the world.

=== Awards and recognition ===
- In 2015, 91springboard, co-founded by Chawla, was selected by Barclays as its partner for the Rise fintech innovation platform in Mumbai, marking Barclays' first such partnership in India.
- In 2016, 91springboard was recognized as one of six world-class incubators in India under NITI Aayog’s Atal Innovation Mission.
- In 2018, 91springboard was chosen by Google as the only Indian partner for the Google for Entrepreneurs (GFE) program.
