= Vivek Khurana =

Indian cricketer (born 1984)

Personal information
- Born: 2 June 1984 (age 42); Delhi, India
- Source: Cricinfo, 9 April 2016

Vivek Khurana (born 2 June 1984) is an Indian former cricketer. He played one first-class match for Delhi in 2001/02.

== See also ==
- List of Delhi cricketers
