= Sher Mohammad =

Indian cricketer (born 1936)

Personal information
- Born: 11 February 1936 (age 90); Poona, Bombay Presidency, British India (now Pune, Maharashtra, India)
- Source: Cricinfo, 11 April 2016

Sher Mohammad (born 11 February 1936) is an Indian former cricketer. He played first-class cricket for Delhi and Maharashtra between 1954 and 1966.

== See also ==
- List of Delhi cricketers
