= Diwan Chand Chawla =

Pakistani politician

Member of the Provincial Assembly of Sindh
- In office June 2013 – 28 May 2018
- Constituency: Reserved seat for minorities

Personal details
- Born: 14 April 1961 (age 64) Sukkur, Sindh, Pakistan

Diwan Chand Chawla is a Pakistani politician who had been a Member of the Provincial Assembly of Sindh, from June 2013 to May 2018.

== Early life and education ==
He was born on 14 April 1961 in Sukkur.

He has done Bachelor of Science from Sindh University.

== Political career ==
He was elected to the Provincial Assembly of Sindh as a candidate of Muttahida Qaumi Movement on reserved seat for minorities in the 2013 Pakistani general election.
