= Louise Chawla =

American psychologist

Louise Chawla is a Professor emerita in the College of Architecture and Planning at the University of Colorado.

Louise Chawla's interest in children's informal learning in their communities led her to a master's degree in education and child development from Bryn Mawr College and a doctorate in environmental psychology from the City University of New York. She has written on children and nature, children in cities, and the development of environmental activism. Her publications include the books In the First Country of Places: Nature, Poetry and Childhood Memory, the co-authored collection Growing Up in an Urbanising World., and the co-authored Placemaking with Children and Youth, which received the 2019 Environmental Design Research Association Achievement Award. When she served as a Fulbright Scholar at the Norwegian Centre for Child Research, she revived the Growing Up in Cities project of UNESCO, which continues to involve urban children in cities around the world in evaluating and improving their local communities. The project won the 2002 Place Research Award from the Environmental Design Research Association. She is involved in promoting design for children's nature play in residential neighborhoods.

== Publications ==
- Placemaking with Children and Youth: Participatory Practices for Planning Sustainable Communities, New Village Press, September 2018.
