= Malhotra Chamanlal =

Indian cricketer (1935–2020)

Personal information
- Born: 5 September 1935; Ludhiana, Punjab, India
- Died: 14 February 2020 (aged 84); Ludhiana, Punjab, India
- Batting: Right-handed

Domestic team information
- Years: Team
- 1952-53 to 1957-58: Eastern Punjab
- 1962-63 to 1967-68: Northern Punjab
- 1968-69 to 1970-71: Punjab

Career statistics
Competition	First-class
Matches	46
Runs scored	2418
Batting average	37.78
100s/50s	4/12
Top score	141 not out
Balls bowled
Wickets	42
Bowling average	38.30
5 wickets in innings	0
10 wickets in match	0
Best bowling	4/46
Catches/stumpings	32/0
- Source: ESPNcricinfo, 4 April 2015

Malhotra Chamanlal, also known as Chaman Lal Malhotra or just Chamanlal (5 September 1935 – 14 February 2020) was an Indian cricketer who played first-class cricket from 1952 to 1970. In a minor match in Patiala in 1956-57 he made 502 not out.

== Early career ==
Chamanlal made his first-class debut in 1952-53 for Eastern Punjab and played a few more games in subsequent seasons. He also opened the batting for Punjab University in the Rohinton Baria Trophy from 1953–54 to 1955–56.

In 1956–57, playing in Patiala for Mohindra College, Patiala, against Government College, Rupar, he scored 502 not out. He is still one of only seven players to score 500 or more in a cricket match anywhere in the world, but his score was never an Indian record, as Dadabhoy Havewala had scored 515 in a match in Bombay in 1933–34.

In 1957-58 he captained Eastern Punjab, scoring 182 runs at an average of 30.33 and taking 5 wickets at 41.80 in a team that lost all three matches. He then spent time in England furthering his engineering studies and experience.

== Captaincy of Northern Punjab ==
Chamanlal next played first-class cricket in 1962–63, by which time the Eastern Punjab team had been disbanded, and he captained its successor team, Northern Punjab, in the Ranji Trophy. In his first match he scored 131 not out, his first century, against Jammu and Kashmir. In 1963-64 he was one of the leading batsmen in the Ranji Trophy, with 414 runs at 69.00, including another century (138) against Jammu and Kashmir. He played for North Zone in 1963–64, in the match against the touring MCC. In 1964–65, still captaining Northern Punjab, he made his highest score, 141 not out, against Railways. In the same match he also took his best bowling figures, 4 for 46, in Railways' first innings.

In all 23 matches that he played for Northern Punjab between 1962–63 and 1967–68, captaining the side in every match, he made 1615 runs at an average of 55.68, and scored all four of his first-class centuries. He also took 24 wickets at 30.25.

== Later career ==
Northern Punjab and Southern Punjab combined after 1967–68 to form a united Punjab team. Rajinder Pal was the inaugural captain, but Chamanlal took over the captaincy in 1969-70 and 1970–71. Punjab made the Ranji Trophy finals for the first time in 1970–71.

He was later an administrator and selector for the Punjab Cricket Association. He died in February 2020, aged 84. He and his wife had two daughters.
