= Shiv Narain =

Ugandan cricketer

Shiv Narain was an Indian cricketer. He was a wicket-keeper who played for Delhi. He was a wicket-keeper.

Narain made a single first-class appearance for the side, during the 1944–45 season, against Northern India. He scored a duck in the first innings in which he batted, and 10 runs in the second, as the team lost by an innings margin.

Narian took one stumping.
