= Gulshan Mehra =

Indian cricketer (1937–1986)

Gulshan Rai Mehra
Personal information
- Born: 16 April 1937; Delhi, India
- Died: 30 May 1986 (aged 49); Delhi, India
- Source: ESPNcricinfo, 9 April 2016

Gulshan Rai Mehra (16 April 1937 – 30 May 1986) was an Indian cricketer. He played 39 first-class matches for Delhi between 1957 and 1967.

== See also ==
- List of Delhi cricketers
