= Rajinder Singh (cricketer) =

Indian cricketer (born 1960)

Personal information
- Born: 15 April 1960 (age 66); Delhi, India
- Source: Cricinfo, 6 April 2016

Rajinder Singh (born 15 April 1960) is an Indian former cricketer. He played first-class cricket for Bengal and Delhi between 1980 and 1991.

== See also ==
- List of Bengal cricketers
- List of Delhi cricketers
