= Vinod Gupta (cricketer) =

Indian cricketer (born 1946)

Personal information
- Born: 16 December 1946 (age 79); Meerut, India
- Source: Cricinfo, 9 April 2016

Vinod Gupta (born 16 December 1946) is an Indian former cricketer. He played first-class cricket for Delhi, Orissa and Uttar Pradesh between 1966 and 1978.

== See also ==
- List of Delhi cricketers
