= Shirish Srivastava =

Indian cricketer (born 1963)

Personal information
- Born: 1 December 1963 (age 62); Delhi, India
- Role: Bowler ( Leg Spin)
- Source: Cricinfo, 11 April 2016

Shirish Srivastava (born 1 December 1963) is an Indian former cricketer. He played first-class cricket for Assam and Delhi between 1984 and 1990. As a professional, he served in Delhi Transco Limited.

== See also ==
- List of Delhi cricketers
