= Mazhar Hussain (cricketer) =

Indian cricketer

Mazhar Hussain was an Indian cricketer who played for Delhi.

Hussain made a single first-class appearance for the team, during the 1944–1945 season, against Northern India. He scored 12 runs in the first innings in which he batted, and 21 runs in the second.

Hussain took figures of 1–90 in the only innings in which he bowled, as Delhi lost the match by an innings margin.
