= Neeraj Chawla =

Indian cricketer (born 1979)

Personal information
- Born: 19 October 1979 (age 47); Delhi, India
- Source: ESPNcricinfo, 8 April 2016

Neeraj Chawla (born 19 October 1979) is an Indian former cricketer. He played two List A matches for Delhi in 1999/00.

== See also ==
- List of Delhi cricketers
