= Shashikant Khurana =

Indian cricketer (born 1966)

Personal information
- Born: 4 December 1966 (age 59); Delhi, India
- Source: Cricinfo, 9 April 2016

Shashikant Khurana (born 4 December 1966) is an Indian former cricketer. He played nine first-class matches for Delhi between 1984 and 1987.

== See also ==
- List of Delhi cricketers
