= Rajinder Amarnath =

Indian cricket player and commentator (born 1956)

Personal information
- Born: 30 June 1956 (age 70); Delhi, India
- Batting: Right-handed
- Bowling: Right-arm medium
- Role: All-rounder
- Relatives: Lala Amarnath (father), Surinder Amarnath (brother), Mohinder Amarnath (brother)

Domestic team information
- Years: Team
- 1976/77: Punjab
- 1978/79–1987/88: Haryana
- 1981/82: Delhi
- 1983/84: Vidarbha

Career statistics
Competition	First-class	List A
Matches	36	1
Runs scored	1,164	11
Batting average	27.06	11.00
100s/50s	0/9	0/0
Top score	84*	11
Balls bowled	1,300	60
Wickets	17	1
Bowling average	36.82	41.00
5 wickets in innings	0	0
10 wickets in match	0	0
Best bowling	3/18	1/41
Catches/stumpings	27/–	0/–
- Source: ESPNcricinfo, 18 March 2016

Rajinder Amarnath Bhardwaj (born 30 June 1956) is an Indian former cricket player and commentator. He represented various teams during his first-class playing career. He is the youngest son of former India Test cricketer Lala Amarnath.

== Career ==
Amarnath made his first-class debut in October 1971 at the age of 15, playing for Vazir Sultan Tobacco XI in the Moin-ud-Dowlah Gold Cup Tournament. His Ranji Trophy debut came only five years later for Punjab in the 1976–77 Ranji Trophy. He switched to Haryana before 1978–79 Ranji Trophy and played most of his cricket for the team. He also made single season appearances for Delhi and Vidarbha in 1981/82 and 1983/84 respectively. He finished his career with 36 first-class and one List A appearance.

Amarnath became a cricket commentator after his playing career. He worked as a commentator for several years for All India Radio and Doordarshan. Also a coach and author, Amarnath authored a book on his father Lala Amarnath: Life And Times—The Making Of A Legend.

== Personal life and family ==
Amarnath went to St. Stephen's College, Delhi. He is the youngest son of Lala Amarnath, who played 24 Test matches for India and was the first Indian to score a Test century which he scored on his debut. Lala's two elder sons Surinder and Mohinder also represented India in Tests and ODIs, with the former too scoring a century on Test debut while the latter won man of the match in the 1983 Cricket World Cup Final which India won. Rajinder also has two elder sisters who live in New Delhi.
