= Robin Singh Jr. =

Indian cricketer (born 1970)

Robin Singh
Personal information
- Born: 1 January 1970 (age 56); Delhi, India
- Batting: Right-handed
- Bowling: Right-arm fast-medium

International information
- National side: India
- Only Test: 2 January 1999 v New Zealand

Career statistics
Competition	Test	First-class
Matches	1	45
Runs scored	0	196
Batting average	0	6.75
100s/50s	0/0	0/0
Top score	0	24
Balls bowled	240	8,440
Wickets	3	149
Bowling average	58.66	26.55
5 wickets in innings	0	12
10 wickets in match	0	1
Best bowling	2/74	7/53
Catches/stumpings	1/–	12/–
- Source: CricInfo, 10 September 2022

Robin Singh (born 1 January 1970) is a former Indian cricketer who played one Test match in 1999. He currently serves as one of the cricket experts for All India Radio and as an income tax inspector for ITO, New Delhi.

His sole Test match was against New Zealand in 1999 at Hamilton as a replacement for Ajit Agarkar. He has represented Delhi in the Ranji Trophy, with his best performances including a 10-wicket haul for Delhi in a Ranji Trophy game. He also vice-captained the Delhi Ranji team for some time. He was also part of the India A team against West Indies at Bangalore. He retired from first class cricket in 2004.
