= Ashu Dani =

Indian cricketer (born 1974)

Personal information
- Born: 3 October 1974 (age 52); Delhi, India
- Source: ESPNcricinfo, 8 April 2016

Ashu Dani (born 3 October 1974) is an Indian former cricketer. He played 49 first-class matches for Delhi between 1994 and 2001.

== See also ==
- List of Delhi cricketers
