= Surinder Amarnath =

Indian cricketer (born 1948)

Personal information
- Full name: Surinder Amarnath Bhardwaj
- Born: 30 December 1948 (age 77); Kanpur, United Provinces, India
- Batting: Left-handed
- Bowling: Right-arm medium
- Role: Batsman
- Relatives: Lala Amarnath (father); Mohinder Amarnath (brother); Rajinder Amarnath (brother)

Domestic team information
- Years: Team
- 1964/65–1967/68: Northern Punjab
- 1967/68–1980/81: North Zone
- 1968/69–1973/74: Punjab
- 1974/75–1980/81: Delhi
- 1983/84: Baroda
- 1984/85: Gujarat

Career statistics
Competition	Test	ODI	FC	LA
Matches	10	3	145	20
Runs scored	550	100	8,175	582
Batting average	30.55	33.00	40.47	36.37
100s/50s	1/3	0/1	16/47	1/3
Top score	124	62	235*	102*
Balls bowled	11	0	437	0
Wickets	1	–	4	–
Bowling average	5.00	–	65.00	–
5 wickets in innings	0	–	0	–
10 wickets in match	0	–	0	–
Best bowling	1/5	–	1/5	–
Catches/stumpings	4/–	1/–	47/–	3/–
- Source: Cricinfo, 29 July 2019

Surinder Amarnath Bhardwaj (born 30 December 1948) is a former Indian Test cricketer remembered for his aggressive batting who could destroy the best of attacks when in full flow. He is the eldest son of Lala Amarnath. Described as a "schoolboy prodigy" and a "classy left-hander" by Cricinfo writer Partab Ramchand, he made his first-class debut before he turned 15. As an 18-year-old he scored a historic century at Lord's in 1967, hitting the last two balls of the match for six to secure victory for the Indian Schoolboys against England Schoolboys. He scored a century on Test debut against New Zealand in 1976. He played 10 Test matches and 145 first-class matches.

== Cricket career ==
Surinder Amarnath made his first-class debut in December 1963, a few days before he turned 15, in a match played in Poona to raise money for the National Defence Fund. In the same match his father, Lala Amarnath, playing for the opposing team, played his last first-class match at the age of 52. Surinder scored 86 on debut.

Surinder began playing for Northern Punjab in the Ranji Trophy in 1964–65, and scored his first century against Delhi in 1966–67. Still a schoolboy, he toured England with the Indian Schools team in 1967. In the match against MCC Schools at Lord's, as an 18-year-old, he scored 104 not out, hitting the last two balls of the match for six to take his team to victory.

Amarnath scored not-out double-centuries in the Ranji Trophy for Punjab against Madhya Pradesh in 1971–72 and against Delhi in 1972–73. He played his first match for India in an unofficial Test against the touring Sri Lankans in 1975–76, scoring 118 in a low-scoring match that India won by 64 runs. He was selected for the tour of New Zealand that followed shortly afterwards.

He scored a century on his Test debut against New Zealand in January 1976, making 124 and adding 204 for the second wicket with Sunil Gavaskar. He played the full three Test series in New Zealand, but did not score higher than 27 in five innings after his debut century. He then played two Tests during the tour to the West Indies in 1976, and then two more against England at home in India in 1977, during which he scored two half centuries. After returning early from the 1977–78 tour to Australia due to injury, He made a half century against Pakistan in Lahore in October 1978, but he was dropped after the last of his 10 Tests in November 1978 against Pakistan. He also played three One Day Internationals, all against Pakistan in 1978, with a high score of 62.

He continued playing domestic cricket after being dropped from the national side. Playing for Delhi against the Rest of India in the 1980–81 Irani Trophy match he made 235 not out, establishing an Irani Trophy record that stood for 38 years. His last season as a first-class cricketer was the 1985–86 season.

In summarising Amarnath's career, Partab Ramchand writes "given the brilliant start to his Test career, and the promise he held out, Surinder Amarnath's overall figures may be disappointing. But he was given a raw deal by the selectors." A very aggressive batsman, Ramchand wrote of him, "Surinder could be [a] bit flashy but when in full flow he was a treat to watch and could decimate even the best of attacks".

== Family ==
Surinder Amarnath's father Lala and brother Mohinder also represented India at Test level. Another brother, Rajinder, played first-class cricket from 1971 to 1987, mostly for Haryana. Surinder's son Digvijay has played first-class cricket in Sri Lanka.
