= Rahul Dixit =

American telecommunications engineer

Rahul Dixit is a telecommunications engineer for the Space & Airborne Systems Raytheon Company, Redondo Beach, CA. He was named Fellow of the Institute of Electrical and Electronics Engineers (IEEE) in 2014 for leadership in microwave monolithic integrated circuits technologies and in active electronically steerable arrays application.
