= Suresh Luthra =

Indian cricketer (1944–2019)

Personal information
- Born: 27 November 1944
- Died: 12 February 2019 (aged 74); Faridabad, Haryana, India
- Batting: Left-handed
- Bowling: Left-arm medium-fast

Domestic team information
- Years: Team
- 1965–66: Northern Punjab
- 1967–68 to 1979–80: Delhi
- 1980–81: Punjab

Career statistics
Competition	FC	List A
Matches	67	3
Runs scored	1014	5
Batting average	16.35	5.00
100s/50s	1/4	0/0
Top score	101	5
Balls bowled	12,047	216
Wickets	262	3
Bowling average	16.92	35.33
5 wickets in innings	14	0
10 wickets in match	2	n/a
Best bowling	9/70	3/32
Catches/stumpings	61/–	0/–
- Source: CricketArchive, 16 February 2019

Suresh Luthra (27 November 1944 – 12 February 2019) was an Indian first-class cricketer. He played most of his career for Delhi.

Luthra scored 1014 runs in 76 innings in first-class cricket and made one century. His left-arm fast bowling was more successful, with 262 wickets in 67 matches. His best innings figures were 9 for 70 against Services in the Ranji Trophy in 1976–77. He averaged 16.92 and amassed 14 five-wicket hauls and two ten-wicket hauls. He played some limited overs cricket before retiring in 1981.
