= Madan Mehra =

Indian cricketer (born 1934)

Personal information
- Full name: Madan Mehra
- Born: 13 June 1934 (age 92); Pathankot, British India
- Batting: Right-handed
- Bowling: Legbreak googly
- Source: ESPNcricinfo, 9 April 2016

Madan Mehra (born 13 June 1934) is an Indian former cricketer. He played first-class cricket for Delhi and Railways between 1953 and 1972.
