= Gokul Inder Dev =

Indian cricketer (1938–2019)

Personal information
- Born: 1 August 1938; Amritsar, Punjab Province, British India
- Died: 14 May 2019 (aged 80)
- Batting: Right-handed
- Bowling: Leg-break and googly

Career statistics
Competition	First-class	List A
Matches	93	1
Runs scored	3,485	8
Batting average	29.53	–
100s/50s	7/13	0/0
Top score	131	8*
Balls bowled	13,834	6
Wickets	302	0
Bowling average	21.39	–
5 wickets in innings	25	–
10 wickets in match	5	–
Best bowling	8/37	–
Catches/stumpings	27/–	1/–
- Source: CricketArchive, 12 January 2023

Gokul Inder Dev (1 August 1938 – 14 May 2019) was an Indian first-class cricket player. As an all-rounder, the majority of his cricket was played for and on the, Indian Armed Services cricket team.
