= Arun Sharma (Punjab cricketer) =

Indian cricketer

Personal information
- Full name: Arun Kumar Sharma
- Born: 21 April 1958; Amritsar, Punjab, India
- Died: 6 October 2023 (aged 65)
- Batting: Right-handed
- Role: Wicket-keeper

Domestic team information
- Years: Team
- 1978/79–1993/94: Punjab

Career statistics
Competition	FC
Matches	73
Runs scored	1,533
Batting average	21.29
100s/50s	1/7
Top score	107
Balls bowled	–
Wickets	–
Bowling average	–
5 wickets in innings	–
10 wickets in match	–
Best bowling	–
Catches/stumpings	167/37
- Source: ESPNcricinfo, 14 October 2017

Arun Kumar Sharma (21 April 1958 – 6 October 2023) was an Indian former first-class cricketer who played for Punjab. He worked as a cricket coach, selector and administrator after his playing career.

== Career ==
A wicket-keeper, Sharma made his first-class debut at the age of 20 for India Under-22s against the touring West Indies team in November 1978. He played for Punjab in the Ranji Trophy for the first time the following month, starting a 16-season run as the team's first-choice wicket-keeper. He was part of the Punjab team that lifted the 1992–93 Ranji Trophy, effecting seven dismissals in the final against Maharashtra. Sharma appeared in a total of 73 first-class matches and effected over 200 dismissals.

Sharma continued to be associated with the sport after his playing career. He worked as a selector for the India under-19 team. He also worked as the head coach of the Punjab senior side for several years until the appointment of Ajay Ratra in 2017 for that position. In 2017, the Punjab Cricket Association selected Sharma as its joint secretary.
