= Yogendra Chowdhury =

Indian cricketer (1934–1994)

Personal information
- Born: 24 October 1934; Delhi, India
- Died: 11 July 1994 (aged 59); Bombay, India
- Source: Cricinfo, 8 April 2016

Yogendra Chowdhury (24 October 1934 – 11 July 1994) was an Indian cricketer. He played first-class cricket for Delhi and Railways between 1953 and 1968.

== See also ==
- List of Delhi cricketers
