= Venkat Sunderam =

Indian cricketer

Personal information
- Full name: Venkat N Sunderam
- Batting: Left-handed
- Role: Batsman

Domestic team information
- Years: Team
- 1970/71–1980/81: Delhi
- 1973/74: Tamil Nadu

Career statistics
Competition	FC	List A
Matches	81	14
Runs scored	3,855	351
Batting average	32.12	27.00
100s/50s	5/22	1/0
Top score	177	102*
Balls bowled	133	6
Wickets	2	0
Bowling average	59.00	–
5 wickets in innings	0	–
10 wickets in match	0	n/a
Best bowling	1/0	–
Catches/stumpings	59/0	3/–
- Source: ESPNcricinfo, 10 January 2016

Venkat Sunderam is a former Indian first-class cricketer who played for Delhi and Tamil Nadu. After his playing career, he became a selector for Delhi and pitch committee chairman for the Board of Control for Cricket in India (BCCI).

== Career ==
Sunderam was a left-handed opening batsman who played for Delhi between the 1970/71 and 1980/81 seasons and one season for Tamil Nadu in 1973/74. He was the leading run-getter of the 1977–78 Ranji Trophy with 608 runs at an average of 86.85 including three centuries. His personal best score of 177 came in the 1977–78 Irani Cup for the Rest of India against Bombay. He was part of the Delhi team in its back-to-back Ranji wins in 1978/79 and 1979/80. His last first class match was for Delhi in the 1980–81 Irani Cup against the Rest of India which Delhi won on first innings lead.

Sunderam was a team manager for India in the 1990s. He became a member of the ten-member selection committee of Delhi in 2002 and a member of the five-member Delhi selection panel in 2005. He was also the pitch committee chairman for BCCI. He was Delhi District Cricket Association's curator, a position he quit in 2014. As of December 2015, he is the executive secretary of the Shahid Vijay Singh Pathik Sports Complex in Greater Noida.
