= Hari Gidwani =

Indian cricketer (born 1953)

Personal information
- Born: 23 October 1953 (age 73); Delhi, India
- Batting: Right-handed
- Bowling: Leg break googly
- Role: Batsman

Domestic team information
- Years: Team
- 1972/73–1977/78: Delhi
- 1978/79–1991/92: Bihar

Career statistics
Competition	FC	List A
Matches	119	17
Runs scored	6,805	312
Batting average	42.53	18.35
100s/50s	15/32	0/1
Top score	229	88
Balls bowled	3,328	155
Wickets	29	2
Bowling average	40.82	67.50
5 wickets in innings	0	0
10 wickets in match	0	n/a
Best bowling	2/6	1/13
Catches/stumpings	75/–	3/–
- Source: ESPNcricinfo, 10 January 2016

Hari Gidwani (born 23 October 1953) is an Indian former first-class cricketer and selector. He played over 100 first-class matches mainly representing Delhi and Bihar.

== Early life ==
Gidwani was born into a Sindhi family. He studied at Hindu College, University of Delhi. His grandfather, Chaina Ram, established a halwai sweet shop in Lahore in 1901. Following the partition of British India in 1947, his father Neecharam, relocated the family business to India, continuing his father's legacy. Hari Gidwani later became the owner of a sweet store in Old Delhi.

== Career ==
Gidwani played as a right-handed middle-order batsman, known to be "a dashing stroke player". He appeared in 119 first-class matches in a career spanning 20 seasons from 1972/73 to 1991/92 and scored more than 6000 runs. He started his career with his home team Delhi, but switched to Bihar in 1978/79. He top-scored with 100 and 48 against the visiting Sri Lankan team in 1975/76, but did not gain Indian team selection. Gidwani scored centuries in five Ranji Trophy matches in succession during 1986–87 Ranji Trophy and 1987–88 Ranji Trophy. His highest score of 229 came against Karnataka in the 1989–90 Ranji Trophy pre-quarterfinal in which he was also the captain.

After retiring, Gidwani became a junior team selector. He worked as a member of the Delhi selection panel since the 1990s, a position he holds as of October 2015.
