= Feroze Ghayas =

Indian cricketer (born 1973)

Personal information
- Born: 3 May 1973 (age 53); Delhi, India
- Source: ESPNcricinfo, 9 April 2016

Feroze Ghayas (born 3 May 1973) is an Indian former cricketer. He played first-class cricket for Delhi and Haryana between 1992 and 2001.

== See also ==
- List of Delhi cricketers
