= Rajinder Pal =

Indian cricketer (1937–2018)

Personal information
- Born: 18 November 1937; Delhi, British India
- Died: 9 May 2018 (aged 80); Dehradun, Uttarakhand, India
- Batting: Right-handed
- Bowling: Right-arm fast-medium

International information
- National side: India
- Only Test (cap 107): 21 January 1964 v England

Career statistics
Competition	Tests	First-class
Matches	1	98
Runs scored	6	1046
Batting average	6.00	11.12
100s/50s	0/0	0/0
Top score	3	45
Balls bowled	78	14826
Wickets	0	337
Bowling average	–	21.89
5 wickets in innings	–	23
10 wickets in match	–	2
Best bowling	–	8/27
Catches/stumpings	0/-	49/-
- Source: Cricinfo

Rajinder Pal (18 November 1937 – 9 May 2018) was an Indian cricketer who played in one Test in 1964. He played first-class cricket in India from 1954 to 1973.

== Early career ==
An opening bowler, Rajinder Pal made his first-class debut in 1954–55 for Delhi at the age of 17. While he was studying at Delhi University he played for Indian Universities in first-class matches against the New Zealanders in 1955–56 and the Australians in 1959–60, as well as playing for Delhi University in the inter-university competition, the Rohinton Baria Trophy. When Delhi University won the trophy in 1959–60 he took eight wickets in the final.

He took 8 for 54 and 4 for 125 for Delhi against Railways in the Ranji Trophy in 1959–60, and captained Delhi in 1960–61 and 1961–62. In his first match as captain he took 6 for 3 and 3 for 17 against Jammu and Kashmir, bowling unchanged while Jammu and Kashmir were dismissed for 23 and 28.

In 1961–62 Pal was selected to play for the Indian Board President's XI against the MCC and took four wickets, including that of Ted Dexter, bowled for 3. He also played in the corresponding match when England toured in 1963–64, and despite taking only one wicket, he was selected to play in the Second Test shortly afterwards.

== Test match in 1963–64 ==
The 1963–64 series was played on exceedingly slow pitches, and all five Tests were drawn. In his report in Wisden, E.M. Wellings described the pitches as "so slow and true that a competent craftsman could bat successfully with a broom handle ... the matches were doomed to be drawn almost from the outset". Ian Wooldridge wrote that India "included one fast bowler in her side more out of convention than for any tactical purpose". In the First Test that bowler was Vasant Ranjane, who took one wicket.

Rajinder Pal took Ranjane's place in the Second Test and bowled 13 overs in the match for 22 runs and no wicket. Wooldridge was dismissive of his performance, comparing his pace, somewhat hyperbolically, with that of the Australian spinner Johnny Martin, and saying that, when his deliveries bounced, "the batsman was almost striking a stationary ball". Ramakant Desai replaced Rajinder Pal for the next two Tests, and for the Fifth Test India played no pace bowler at all.

== Later career ==
Rajinder Pal continued to play in the Ranji Trophy for Delhi until the 1965–66 season, when he played for Southern Punjab, who he captained in 1966–67. He played for Punjab as the new team's inaugural captain in 1968–69, then under Malhotra Chamanlal in 1969–70. He returned to Delhi in 1971–72, and finished his career with Haryana in 1972–73 and 1973–74.

His career record of 337 wickets at an average of 21.89 disguises a tendency to excel against weaker teams but struggle in stronger competition. In 12 Ranji Trophy matches against Jammu and Kashmir he took 60 wickets at 9.53, but for North Zone in the Duleep Trophy he took 16 wickets at 41.87 in 10 matches.

His brother Ravinder Pal played a few matches for Delhi in the 1960s. They opened the bowling together against Jammu and Kashmir in the only match they played together in 1964–65, then in 1965–66 they opened the bowling for opposing sides when Delhi played Southern Punjab, taking 15 wickets between them.

He became a coach, running the Rajinder Pal Cricket Academy in New Delhi. Kapil Dev spent a week learning from him before touring England for the first time in 1979.

When the Board of Control for Cricket in India announced a pension scheme for former Test players in 2004, Rajinder Pal said he would donate his for "the development of future Uttaranchal cricketers".

== Death ==
Rajinder Pal died on 9 May 2018 at his residence in Dehradun. M. P. Pandove, who was a teammate of Rajinder Pal during his playing days, was among those who condoled on his death.
