= Satish Nanda =

Indian cricketer

Personal information
- Full name: Satish Nanda

Career statistics
Competition	First-class
Matches	9
Runs scored	271
Batting average	24.63
100s/50s	1/-
Top score	100*
Balls bowled	940
Wickets	21
Bowling average	25.61
5 wickets in innings	0
10 wickets in match	0
Best bowling	4/11
Catches/stumpings	6/0
- Source: ESPNcricinfo, 29 May 2020

Satish Nanda was a first class cricketer from India, who played for Eastern Punjab and Delhi. He made his debut in 1951–52 season and played his last first class match in 1955–56 season.
