= Mohan Chaturvedi =

Indian cricketer

Personal information
- Full name: Mohan Gopaldutt Chaturvedi
- Born: 4 June 1971 (age 55); Delhi, India
- Batting: Right-handed
- Role: Wicket-keeper

Domestic team information
- Years: Team
- 1989–1996: Delhi
- Source: CricketArchive, 2 January 2016

Mohan Gopaldutt Chaturvedi (born 4 June 1971) is a former Indian cricketer who played for Delhi in Indian domestic cricket. He played as a wicket-keeper, and batted right-handed.

Chaturvedi represented the India under-19s at the 1988 Youth World Cup, aged 16. He made his first-class debut for Delhi in November 1989, in the Irani Cup, and his Ranji Trophy debut shortly after. After only five first-class games, Chaturvedi was selected to play for North Zone in the Duleep Trophy. He made further Duleep Trophy appearances during the 1990–91 and 1993–94 seasons, and in those seasons also played in the Deodhar Trophy (the one-day equivalent. Chaturvedi played his last games for Delhi in January 1996, aged 24. In 33 first-class appearances, he had a batting average of only 10.25, with his highest score of 25 not out coming against Services in December 1992 (from tenth in the batting order). In August 2018, he was appointed in the senior selection committee of the Delhi District Cricket Association.
