= Rajiv Vinayak =

Indian cricketer

Personal information
- Born: 29 September 1964 (age 62); Delhi, India
- Height: 5 ft 11 in (1.80 m)
- Batting: Right-handed
- Role: Wicket-keeper

Domestic team information
- Years: Team
- 1986/87–1995/96: Delhi
- 1993/94–1994/95: Services

Career statistics
Competition	FC	List A
Matches	50	22
Runs scored	1,568	207
Batting average	33.36	25.87
100s/50s	2/11	0/1
Top score	103*	78*
Balls bowled	18	–
Wickets	0	–
Bowling average	–	–
5 wickets in innings	–	–
10 wickets in match	–	n/a
Best bowling	–	–
Catches/stumpings	73/17	15/9
- Source: ESPNcricinfo, 14 January 2016

Rajiv Vinayak (born 29 September 1964) is an Indian former first-class cricketer who played for Delhi and Services. After retirement, he worked as a coach with the Delhi District Cricket Association.

== Career ==
Vinayak played as a wicket-keeper batsman in 50 first-class and 22 List A matches. He represented Delhi from 1986/87 to 1992/93, followed by Services for 1993/94 and 1994/95 seasons. He then returned to play for Delhi in 1995/96. He was a member of the Delhi team that won the 1988–89 Ranji Trophy and 1991–92 Ranji Trophy.

After retirement, Vinayak became a cricket coach and worked for Delhi District Cricket Association. He worked as Delhi senior team manager in early-2000s and became the junior team coach in 2005. He became the assistant coach of the Delhi senior team in 2006/07. In 2013, he made a comeback as assistant coach of Delhi.
