= Ponnuswami Sitaram =

Indian cricketer (1932–1995)

Cricket information
- Batting: Right-handed
- Bowling: Right-arm medium

Career statistics
Competition	First-class
Matches	69
Runs scored	889
Batting average	14.57
100s/50s	0/2
Top score	74
Balls bowled	16,117
Wickets	288
Bowling average	19.30
5 wickets in innings	19
10 wickets in match	6
Best bowling	8/29
Catches/stumpings	28/–
- Source: CricketArchive

Ponnuswami Sitaram (22 July 1932 – 12 September 1995) was an Indian cricketer born in Bangalore, who played for Delhi in the Ranji Trophy. A right-arm medium-pace bowler, Sitaram was an Indian Cricket Cricketer of the Year in 1963. He toured Pakistan with the Indian Starlets in 1959–60.

After his retirement from first-class cricket, he took up the job of a curator at a leading club in Delhi. He went on to develop cricket grounds and pitches across the northern and central parts of India.
