= Prakash Bhandari =

Indian cricketer (1935–2025)

Personal information
- Born: 27 November 1935; Delhi, British India
- Died: 19 November 2025 (aged 89); Delhi, India
- Batting: Right-handed
- Bowling: Right-arm off-break

International information
- National side: India
- Test debut (cap 73): 26 February 1955 v Pakistan
- Last Test: 2 November 1956 v Australia

Career statistics
Competition	Tests	First-class
Matches	3	63
Runs scored	77	2,552
Batting average	19.25	32.71
100s/50s	0/0	4/11
Top score	39	227
Balls bowled	78	8,035
Wickets	–	122
Bowling average	–	28.24
5 wickets in innings	–	7
10 wickets in match	–	0
Best bowling	–	7/54
Catches/stumpings	1	50
- Source: Cricinfo

Prakash Bhandari (27 November 1935 – 19 November 2025) was an Indian Test cricketer. He played three Tests for India in the 1950s, and played first-class cricket from 1952 to 1970.

== Career ==
Bhandari was an attacking right-handed batsman and an off-break bowler. He appeared for Delhi Schools and Delhi University in All India competitions between 1951–52 and 1956–57. He led Delhi University in the Rohinton Baria Trophy inter-university tournament in the last of those seasons. Bhandari played for the Indian XI against the Silver Jubilee Overseas Cricket Team in 1953–54 and toured Ceylon in 1956.

Bhandari toured Pakistan in 1954–55 as a teenager. After being the twelfth man thrice, he made his debut on the matting wicket in the final Test match at Karachi. He made 19 before being bowled by Khan Mohammad who broke one of the stumps. He also appeared in Tests against New Zealand and Australia. His highest score was 39 against New Zealand at Delhi in 1954–55 where he batted at No. 8 and added 73 with Bapu Nadkarni.

Against Rajasthan in the 1961–62 Ranji Trophy semifinal he scored a hundred in 60 minutes while Bengal was going for a declaration in the second innings. At the time it was believed to be the fastest hundred in Indian cricket, but a 60-minute hundred by Ken Goldie in 1915–16 and a 40-minute one by Ahsan-ul-Haq in 1923–24 have been discovered since then. Bhandari scored 58 in the first innings and took seven wickets in the same match. He compiled his highest first class score of 227 for Delhi against Patiala in the 1957/58 Ranji Trophy and also took nine wickets in the same match for 81.

He worked with the Tata Group.

== Death ==
Bhandari died in Delhi on 19 November 2025, at the age of 89.

== Sources ==
- Christopher Martin-Jenkins, The Complete Who's Who of Test Cricketers
- Anandji Dossa, Cricket Ties, Rupa & Co, 1978
