= Chetanya Nanda =

Indian cricketer (born 1979)

Chetnya Nanda
Personal information
- Full name: Chetnya Nanda
- Born: March 29, 1979 (age 47); Delhi, India
- Batting: Right-handed
- Bowling: Leg break
- Role: Bowler

Domestic team information
- Years: Team
- 2004–2011: Delhi
- 2009: Mumbai Indians
- Source: ESPNcricinfo, 7 May 2025

Chetnya Nanda (born 29 March 1979) is an Indian professional cricketer who plays for Delhi. He has also played for Mumbai Indians. Nanda was born in Delhi. He is a right-hand batsman and a leg-break bowler.

Career statistics
Event	Opponent	Location	Year
First-class debut	-	-	2004–05
Last First-class	Delhi v Bengal	Delhi	1–4 November 2010
List A debut	-	-	2004–05
Last List A	Delhi v Jammu & Kashmir	Patiala	10 February 2011
Twenty20 debut	Delhi v Himachal Pradesh	Delhi	3 April 2007
Last Twenty20	Delhi v Services	Delhi	25 October 2010
