= Vinay Lamba =

Indian cricketer

Personal information
- Full name: Vinay Lamba

Domestic team information
- Years: Team
- 1967/68–1980/81: Delhi

Career statistics
Competition	FC	List A
Matches	76	4
Runs scored	3,286	99
Batting average	31.59	24.75
100s/50s	5/14	0/1
Top score	160	66
Balls bowled	736	27
Wickets	10	1
Bowling average	33.10	20.00
5 wickets in innings	0	0
10 wickets in match	0	n/a
Best bowling	3/17	1/6
Catches/stumpings	28/–	1/–
- Source: ESPNcricinfo, 22 January 2016

Vinay Lamba is an Indian former first-class cricketer who played for Delhi and current chairman of selection committee of the Delhi District Cricket Association.

== Career ==
An opening batsman, Lamba appeared in 76 first-class and 4 List A matches, representing Delhi between the 1967/68 and 1980/81 seasons. He has also played for North Zone and Indian Universities. He scored more than 3000 runs including five hundreds in his first-class career.

Lamba became a match referee after retirement, officiating in domestic matches in India. He was part of the five-member senior team selection panel of Delhi District Cricket Association before he was made the head of Delhi's under-19 selection committee in 2009. He later returned to the senior team selection panel, and holds the position of Delhi's senior team selection committee chairman as of December 2015.
