= 1936–37 Ranji Trophy =

Indian cricket tournament

- The Ranji Trophy
- Dates: 3 December 1936 – 10 February 1937
- Administrator: BCCI
- Cricket format: First-class
- Tournament format: Knockout
- Champions: Nawanagar (1st title)
- Participants: 17
- Matches: 16
- Most runs: Sorabji Colah (Nawanagar) (384)
- Most wickets: Amar Singh (Nawanagar) (28)
- Official website: http://www.bcci.tv

The 1936–37 Ranji Trophy was the third edition of India's first-class cricket championship. Matches were played from 3 December 1936 to 10 February 1937 with a total of 17 teams participating. The sides were divided into four zonal groups, but the tournament utilised a knockout format. Fifteen of the 1935–36 teams returned but Northern India did not. The two newcomers were Bihar and Nawanagar, who won the title at the first attempt after defeating Bengal by 256 runs in the final.

== Teams ==
Although the tournament had a knockout format, the Board of Control for Cricket in India (BCCI) organised the teams by zone. Bihar and Nawanagar made their debuts but Northern India did not participate. Bihar joined the East Zone from which the Central Provinces and Berar team was transferred to the South Zone. The seventeen teams are listed alphabetically by zone and the sides that won each zonal title are in bold.

- **East Zone**
- **Bengal**
- Bihar
- Central India (now Madhya Pradesh)
- Rajputana (now Rajasthan)
- **North Zone**
- Delhi
- Southern Punjab (now Punjab)
- **United Provinces** (now Uttar Pradesh)
- **South Zone**
- Central Provinces and Berar (now Vidarbha)
- **Hyderabad**
- Madras (now Tamil Nadu)
- Mysore (now Karnataka)
- **West Zone**
- Bombay (now Mumbai)
- Gujarat
- Maharashtra
- **Nawanagar**
- Sind
- Western India

== Highlights ==
- Amar Singh of Nawanagar scored 103 (in 75 minutes) & 55, and took 10/83 (6/48 & 4/35) against Sind. Against Bombay, he took 8/62 in an innings. In four matches, he scored 335 (second highest aggregate) and took 28 wickets.
- Mubarak Ali took a hat-trick split across two innings for Nawanagar vs Western India. Against Bengal, Ali scored 90 in 96 minutes batting at No.11
- Shute Banerjee who had played two matches for Bengal was prevented from appearing in the final as he joined the service of the state of Nawanagar.

== Zonal matches ==
=== East Zone ===
Round 1
19-20 December 1936 – Calcutta
**Bengal**	**89 & 152/2**
Bihar	113 & 127
3-5 December 1936 – Ajmer
Rajputana	292 & 117
**Central India**	**232 & 302/9d**

Round 2
23-25 Jan 1937 – Calcutta
**Bengal**	**255 & 108/2**
Central India	128 & 234

3–5 December 1936
Scorecard

**Central India**	**v**	**Rajputana (H)**
232 (81 overs); Ishtiaq Ali 50; Khahwraj Murad 3/20 (8 overs)		292 (75 overs); Harban Singh 69; Ziaul Hussain 5/105 (30 overs)
302/9d (71 overs); Mushtaq Ali 50; Walter Bradshaw 4/68 (27 overs)		117 (38 overs); Himmatsinhji 39; Ziaul Hussain 5/45 (16 overs)

**Central India won by 125 runs**
Mayo College Ground, Ajmer

- Central India won the toss and elected to bat.
- Saiduddin and Jamil Ahmed (Central India); and Thomas Hardy, M. Patel, Sultan Abbas and Richard Saker (Rajputana) made their first-class debuts.

19–20 December 1936
Scorecard

**Bihar**	**v**	**Bengal (H)**
113 (39.3 overs); Bijoy Sen 28; Probodh Dutt 5/33 (14 overs)		89 (46 overs); Kamal Bhattacharya 18; J Das Gupta 6/18 (13 overs)
127 (51 overs); Bijoy Sen 24; A Chowdhury 24; Stanley Behrend 5/29 (14 overs)		152/2 (42.3 overs); Alec Hosie 60; Subir Chakravorty 1/46 (8.3 overs)

**Bengal won by 8 wickets**
Rangers Ground, Calcutta

- This was Bihar's first appearance in the Ranji Trophy.
- Bijoy Sen, A Chowdhury, Edward Leigh, N Qureshi, KAD Naoroji, S. Pathanki, Mohsin Kazi and RC Brookes (Bihar); and Bill Scott and TS Nahapiet (Bengal) made their first-class debuts.

23–25 January 1937
Scorecard

**Central India**	**v**	**Bengal (H)**
128 (53.3 overs); Jamshed Bhaya 33; Shute Banerjee 5/33 (10 overs)		255 (92.2 overs); Alec Hosie 61; Shahabuddin 3/36 (23 overs)
234 (67.5 overs); Mushtaq Ali 67; Tom Longfield 6/57 (23 overs)		108/2 (29 overs); Kartick Bose 60*; Shahabuddin 2/22 (6 overs)

**Bengal won by 8 wickets**
Eden Gardens, Calcutta

- Mohammad Hussain (Central India) made his first-class debut.
- Alec Hosie (Bengal) passed 6,000 runs in first-class cricket.
- Bengal qualified for the semi-final as a result of this match.

=== West Zone ===
Round 1
7-9 December 1936 - Ahmedabad
Gujarat	77 & 105
**Western India**	**186 & 262/9d**
4-6 December 1936 – Ahmedabad
**Nawanagar**	**339 & 147**
Sind	128 & 106

Round 2
8-10 January 1937 – Poona
Maharashtra	159 & 219
**Western India**	**400**
11-13 January 1937 – Poona
**Nawanagar**	**263 & 137/7**
Bombay	174 & 277/6d

Round 3
15-17 January 1937 – Poona
Western India	106 & 174/4
**Nawanagar**	**224 & 341/7d**

4–6 December 1936
Scorecard

**Nawanagar**	**v**	**Sind**
339 (128 overs); Amar Singh 103; Ghulam Mohammad 4/75 (24 overs)		128 (49 overs); Naoomal Jeoomal 46; Amar Singh 6/48 (25 overs)
147 (58.3 overs); Amar Singh 55; Ghulam Mohammad 4/52 (26 overs)		106 (38.3 overs); Ghulam Mohammad 30; Amar Singh 4/35 (15 overs)

**Nawanagar won by 252 runs**
Gujarat College Ground, Ahmedabad

- Nawanagar won the toss and elected to bat.
- Keshav Lal (Nawanagar) and Odhavji (Sind) made their first-class debuts.

Batting first after winning the toss, Nawanagar reached 100 after 124 minutes, in the post-lunch session. Amar Singh reached his half-century in 30 minutes, while adding 106 runs for the sixth wicket. He reached his century in 75 minutes before being caught behind after making 103, an innings that included 2 sixes, 1 five and 10 fours. His team went to stumps at 293/8. Singh shone also with the ball, more so in the third and final day. Adding to the overnight score of 68/6 in his team's second innings, he made 55 in a span of 52 minutes. Sind were set a total of 358 runs to be made in three-and-a-half hours. They lost their first wicket at 10 runs before Ghulam Mohammad was dismissed for 30 post lunch. In a batting collapse that followed, Sind were all out for 106, leaving Nawanagar victorious by 252 runs.

7–9 December 1936
Scorecard

**Western India**	**v**	**Gujarat (H)**
186 (63 overs); Hari Mali 56*; EG Hans 3/20 (10 overs)		77 (46.2 overs); Hemu Adhikari 26; Khwaja Saeed 6/23 (20.2 overs)
262/9d (87 overs); Hari Mali 92; EG Hans 7/41 (25 overs)		105 (50.4 overs); Hemu Adhikari 30; Narsingrao Kesari 4/27 (15.4 overs)

**Western India won by 266 runs**
Gujarat College Ground, Ahmedabad

- Western India won the toss and elected to bat.
- Pratap Rai, Pradyumansinhji Lakhajirajsinhji, Shanoor Khan, Homi Umrigar (all Western India), and Hemu Adhikari, Wyankatrao Ghorpade, Shankar Rao Powar, JJ Yelwande, BB More and Narottam Jhaveri (all Gujarat) made their first-class debuts.

Western India lost five wickets inside an hour after opting to bat first upon winning the toss. They reached 100 in the second session before being dismissed for 186; Hari Mali top-scored for them, remaining unbeaten on 56. EG Hans picked up three wickets for Gujarat giving away 20 runs. Gujarat went to stumps at 36/2. They lost their remaining eight wickets on day two while adding 41 runs to their overnight total. Khwaja Saeed returned with figures of 6/23 for Western India, whose top-order in reply, began slowly taking over an hour to score 50 runs. Subsequently, Faiz Ahmed and Mali accelerated before the latter reached his half-century in 85 minutes while the former scored 4 fours off JJ Yelwande's bowling. They remained unbeaten at close of the day's play taking the team's score to 196/4. Hans picked up four wickets for 12 runs the following morning including that of Ahmed. His team declared after Hari Mali fell setting Gujarat a target of 372 runs. In reply, Gujarat began poorly losing two wickets before lunch. Mali, with his slow left-arm, picked up three wickets, while Narsingrao Kesari finished with four wickets for 27 runs, dismissing Gujarat for 105.

8–10 January 1937
Scorecard

**Maharashtra (H)**	**v**	**Western India**
159 (58.4 overs); Jacob Harris 40; Shantilal Gandhi 3/39 (18 overs)		400 (141.4 overs); Faiz Ahmed 105; SV Datar 6/85 (35.1 overs)
219 (99.2 overs); Yeshwant Gokhale 69; Akbar Khan 3/36 (25 overs)

**Western India won by an innings and 22 runs**
Poona Club Ground, Poona

- Maharashtra won the toss and elected to bat.
- KP Ubhayakar, Yeshwant Gokhale, Krishnarao Jadhav and NG Talukdar (Maharashtra), and Akbar Khan (Western India) made their first-class debuts.

11–13 January 1937
Scorecard

**Bombay**	**v**	**Nawanagar**
174 (72.2 overs); Dadabhoy Havewala 52; Amar Singh 8/62 (28.2 overs)		263 (110.5 overs); Abdul Aziz 89; Vijay Merchant 4/45 (13 overs)
277/6d (91 overs); Vijay Merchant 114*; Albert Wensley 2/37 (10 overs)		137/7 (48 overs); Amar Singh 52*; Dadabhoy Havewala 3/29 (14 overs)

**Match drawn**
Deccan Gymkhana Ground, Poona
Umpires: Ladha Ramji and Vali Ahmed

- Bombay won the toss and elected to bat.
- Vijay Merchant (Bombay) passed 4,000 runs in first-class cricket.

15–17 January 1937
Scorecard

**Nawanagar**	**v**	**Western India**
224 (132.3 overs); Sorabji Colah 57; Khwaja Saeed 3/52 (37.3 overs)		106 (55.3 overs); Homi Umrigar 34; Mubarak Ali 4/41 (18.3 overs)
341/7d (104 overs); Sorabji Colah 136; Khwaja Saeed 3/94 (29 overs)		174/4 (49 overs); Shantilal Gandhi 84; Yadvendrasinhji 1/16 (7 overs)

**Match drawn**
Poona Club Ground, Poona
Umpires: Ladha Ramji and GN Kesari

- Nawanagar won the toss and elected to bat.
- Sorabji Colah (Nawanagar) passed 3,000 runs in first-class cricket.

=== South Zone ===
Round 1
16-18 December 1936 – Chennai
**Madras**	**303 & 237/9d**
Mysore	123 & 38
25-27 December 1936 – Secunderabad
**Hyderabad**	**190 & 68/2**
Central Provinces and Berar	150 & 104

Round 2
16-18 January – Chennai
Madras	110 & 97
**Hyderabad**	**203 & 217**

16–18 December 1936
Scorecard

**Madras (H)**	**v**	**Mysore**
303 (80.4 overs); A. G. Ram Singh 100; YS Ramaswami 4/57 (17.4 overs)		123 (42.2 overs); BK Garudachar 30; M. J. Gopalan 4/17 (13 overs)
237/9d (77 overs); BS Thyagarajan 58; BK Garudachar 3/41 (15 overs)		38 (23.1 overs); BV Ramakrishnappa 12*; M. J. Gopalan 5/15 (12 overs)

**Madras won by 379 runs**
Madras Cricket Club Ground, Madras

- Madras won the toss and elected to bat.
- Narayanaswami Rao (Madras), and John Snaize and BV Ramakrishnappa (Mysore) made their first-class debuts.

25–27 December 1936
Scorecard

**Central Provinces and Berar**	**v**	**Hyderabad (H)**
150 (48.4 overs); MR Jaiwant 39; Sorabji Mehta 5/31 (12.4 overs)		190 (68.2 overs); Syed Mohammad Hadi 47*; Chandu Sarwate 5/33 (14.2 overs)
104 (34.4 overs); PN Laghate 22; Asadullah Qureshi 6/51 (15.4 overs)		68/2 (29 overs); VG Mache 31; Chandu Sarwate 1/15 (8 overs)

**Hyderabad won by 8 wickets**
Gymkhana Ground, Secunderabad

- Sorabji Mehta (Hyderabad) and Chandu Sarwate (Central Provinces and Berar) made their first-class debuts, while Srivastava and Chitnavis (Central Provinces and Berar) and Dayanand Archaye (Hyderabad) played their only first-class match.

16–18 January 1937
Scorecard

**Hyderabad**	**v**	**Madras (H)**
203 (59 overs); Edulji Aibara 84; A. G. Ram Singh 6/81 (22 overs)		110 (51.4 overs); Gopalaswami Parthasarathi 28; Asadullah Qureshi 5/31 (13 overs)
217 (87.5 overs); Venkataswami 46; A. G. Ram Singh 4/60 (28 overs)		97 (56 overs); AV Krishnaswami 32; Ibrahim Khan 3/17 (12 overs)

**Hyderabad won by 213 runs**
Madras Cricket Club Ground, Madras

- Hyderabad won the toss and elected to bat.
- Ghulam Qureshi (Hyderabad) made his first-class debut.
- Hyderabad qualified for the semi-final as a result of this match.

=== North Zone ===
Round 1
6-7 January 1937 – Delhi
Delhi	127 & 158
**United Provinces**	**126 & 63/7**

Round 2
23-24 January 1937 – Amritsar
Southern Punjab	83 & 130
**United Provinces**	**134 & 164**

6–7 January 1937
Scorecard

**Delhi (H)**	**v**	**United Provinces**
127 (39 overs); Abdul Hamid 43; Phiroze Palia 4/70 (16 overs)		126 (45 overs); Firasat Hussain 41; Musa Khan 4/27 (14 overs)
58 (31.1 overs); Surajuddin 15; Firasat Hussain 5/7 (13.1 overs)		63/7 (19.4 overs); Phiroze Palia 17; Idrees Baig 5/27 (10 overs)

**United Provinces won by 3 wickets**
Feroz Shah Kotla, Delhi

- Abdul Hamid (Delhi) made his first-class debut; and Sultan, Abdul Majid and Lakshman (Delhi), and Shaminuddin, Majid Ali Khan and Wazir Ahmed (United Provinces) played their only first-class match.

23–24 January 1937
Scorecard

**United Provinces**	**v**	**Southern Punjab**
134 (49.1 overs); Akhtar Hussain 34; Lala Amarnath 7/37 (20.1 overs)		83 (33.2 overs); Bahadur Singh 24*; Firasat Hussain 8/15 (10.2 overs)
164 (51.2 overs); Phiroze Palia 68; Lala Amarnath 3/55 (22 overs)		130 (50.1 overs); Roshan Lal 43; Shiv Dayal 43; Phiroze Palia 4/26 (14.1 overs)

**United Provinces won by 85 runs**
Alexandra Ground, Amritsar

- United Provinces won the toss and elected to bat.
- Shamsuddin, Inam Ahmed Hussain, Shamboo Singh and Tariq (United Provinces), and Abdur Rahman, Balbir Singh and Shafiq (Southern Punjab) made their first-class debuts.

== Inter-Zonal Knockout stage ==
Semi-finals
**Nawanagar**	**Walkover**
United Provinces
29–31 January 1937 – Calcutta
**Bengal**	**299 & 158**
Hyderabad	170 & 160

Final
6–10 February 1937 – Bombay
**Nawanagar**	**424 & 383**
Bengal	315 & 236

=== Semi-finals ===
29–31 January 1937
**Only semi-final**
Scorecard

**Bengal (H)**	**v**	**Hyderabad**
299 (96 overs); Ahmed Kamal 105; Sorabji Mehta 3/56 (17 overs)		170 (47.3 overs); Asadullah Qureshi 33; Tom Longfield 4/55 (15 overs)
158 (59.5 overs); Tom Longfield 36; Hyder Ali 4/46 (22 overs)		160 (61.5 overs); Edulji Aibara 69; Kamal Bhattacharya 3/29 (14.5 overs)

**Bengal won by 127 runs**
Eden Gardens, Calcutta

- Bengal won the toss and elected to bat.

=== Final ===
6–10 February 1937
Scorecard

**Nawanagar**	**v**	**Bengal**
424 (140.2 overs); Vinoo Mankad 185; Robert Gourlay 4/126 (49 overs)		315 (104.5 overs); Paul van der Gucht 79; Bert Wensley 4/93 (31 overs)
383 (101.1 overs); R. K. Indravijaysinhji 91; Stanley Behrend 4/119 (29 overs)		236 (82.1 overs); Alfred Skinner 125; Bert Wensley 4/46 (18.1 overs)

**Nawangar won by 256 runs**
Bombay Gymkhana, Bombay
Umpires: J Birtwistle, Vali Ahmed

- Nawanagar won the toss and elected to bat.
- The match was played on a neutral venue.
- James Alexander (Bengal) made his first-class debut.

== Statistics ==
=== Most runs ===
Player	Team	Mat	Inns	NO	Runs	Ave	HS	100	50
Sorabji Colah	Nawanagar	4	8	0	384	48.00	136	1	2
Amar Singh	Nawanagar	4	8	1	335	47.85	103	1	3
Vinoo Mankad	Nawanagar	4	8	0	321	40.12	185	1	1
Kartick Bose	Bengal	4	8	1	235	33.57	60*	0	2
Graham Skinner	Bengal	3	5	1	224	56.00	125	1	0

=== Most wickets ===
Player	Team	Mat	Overs	Wkts	Ave	BBI	SR
Amar Singh	Nawanagar	4	209.1	28	16.82	8/62	44.8
Stanley Behrend	Bengal	4	110.2	19	18.57	5/29	34.8
Firasat Hussain	United Provinces	2	48.3	17	4.35	8/15	17.1
Asadullah Qureshi	Hyderabad	3	60.4	16	13.56	6/51	22.7
Kamal Bhattacharya	Bengal	4	116.5	15	18.80	3/19	46.7
