= List of Bengal cricket team records and statistics =

The Bengal cricket team is an Indian domestic team representing the state of West Bengal. It is administered by the Cricket Association of Bengal (CAB) and participates in tournaments organized by the Board of Control of Cricket in India (BCCI).

Following is the list of records and statistics of the Bengal Cricket team:

== Team history ==
=== Results by season ===
==== Ranji Trophy ====
Year	Played	Wins	Losses	No result	Drawn and won	Drawn and lost	Win %	League Stage Position	Summary
1935-36	3	1	1	–	1	–	33.33	–	Semi-finalists
1936-37	4	3	1	–	–	–	75.00	–	Runners-up
1937–38	3	2	1 (Note: The Bengal cricket team failed to report in the semi-finals. Hence, the match was awarded to Nawanagar cricket team.)	–	–	–	66.67	–	Semi-finalists
1938–39	4	4	–	–	–	–	100.00	–	Champions
1939–40	2	1	1	–	–	–	50.00	–	Zonal Round
1940–41	2	–	1	–	–	–	00.00	–	Zonal Round
1941–42	3	–	1	–	2	–	00.00	–	Semi-finalists
1942–43	2	–	–	–	1	1	00.00	–	Zonal Round
1943–44	4	2	1	–	1	–	50.00	–	Runners-up
1944–45	2	1	1	–	–	–	50.00	–	Zonal Round
1945–46	2	1	1	–	–	–	50.00	–	Zonal Round
1946–47	2	1	1	–	–	–	50.00	–	Zonal Round
1947–48	1	–	1	–	–	–	00.00	–	Zonal Round
1948–49	1	–	–	–	–	1	00.00	–	Round 2
1949–50	1	–	1	–	–	–	00.00	–	Zonal Round
1950–51	2	1	–	–	–	1	50.00	–	Zonal Round
1951–52	2	1	1	–	–	–	50.00	–	Zonal Round
1952–53	5	3	–	–	1	1	60.00	–	Runners-up
1953–54	3	1	1	–	1	–	33.33	–	Semi-finalists
1954–55	4	1	1	–	2	–	25.00	–	Semi-finalists
1955–56	4	3	1	–	–	–	75.00	–	Runners-up
1956–57	3	2	–	–	–	1 (Note: The winner was decided by toss due to unclear results. Services cricket team won the toss and qualified for the final.)	66.67	–	Semi-finalists
1957–58	5	4	–	–	–	1	80.00	1st	Semi-finalists
1958–59	5	4	1	–	–	–	80.00	1st	Runners-up
1959–60	3	2	1	–	–	–	66.67	2nd	Zonal stage
1960–61	4	2	–	–	1	1	50.00	1st	Quarter-finalists
1961–62	4	2	1	–	1	–	50.00	1st	Semi-finalists
1962–63	4	2	1	–	1	–	50.00	1st	Semi-finalists
1963–64	4	1	–	–	2	1	25.00	1st	Quarter-finalists
1964–65	4	1	1	–	2	–	25.00	1st	Quarter-finalists
1965–66	4	2	1	–	1	–	50.00	1st	Semi-finalists
1966–67	5	2	1	–	2	–	40.00	1st	Semi-finalists
1967–68	4	2	1	–	1	–	50.00	1st	Semi-finalists
1968–69	5	4	–	–	–	1	80.00	1st	Runners-up
1969–70	4	3	1	–	–	–	75.00	1st	Semi-finalists
1970–71	5	2	–	–	1	2	40.00	1st	Semi-finalists
1971–72	6	4	1	–	1	–	66.67	1st	Runners-up
1972–73	4	3	1	–	–	–	75.00	1st	Quarter-finalists
1973–74	4	2	–	–	1	1	50.00	1st	Pre Quarter-finalists
1974–75	4	2	1	–	1	–	50.00	1st	Quarter-finalists
1975–76	5	3	–	–	1	1	60.00	1st	Semi-finalists
2018	16	9	7	0	0	0	56.25	3rd	Play-offs
2019	14	6	7	0	0	1	42.86	5th	League stage
2020	14	6	7	0	1	0	50.00	5th	League stage
2021	17	9	8	0	0	0	52.94	2nd	Runners-up
2022	14	6	8	0	0	0	42.86	7th	League stage
2023	14	6	8	0	0	0	42.86	7th	League stage
2024	16	11	3	2	0	0	68.75	1st	Champions
2016	15	8	7	0	0	0	53.33	4th	Play-offs
2017	16	9	7	0	0	0	56.25	3rd	Play-offs
2018	16	9	7	0	0	0	56.25	3rd	Play-offs
2019	14	6	7	0	0	1	42.86	5th	League stage
2020	14	6	7	0	1	0	50.00	5th	League stage
2021	17	9	8	0	0	0	52.94	2nd	Runners-up
2022	14	6	8	0	0	0	42.86	7th	League stage
2023	14	6	8	0	0	0	42.86	7th	League stage
2024	16	11	3	2	0	0	68.75	1st	Champions
2018	16	9	7	0	0	0	56.25	3rd	Play-offs
2019	14	6	7	0	0	1	42.86	5th	League stage
2020	14	6	7	0	1	0	50.00	5th	League stage
2021	17	9	8	0	0	0	52.94	2nd	Runners-up
2022	14	6	8	0	0	0	42.86	7th	League stage
2023	14	6	8	0	0	0	42.86	7th	League stage
2024	16	11	3	2	0	0	68.75	1st	Champions
2016	15	8	7	0	0	0	53.33	4th	Play-offs
2017	16	9	7	0	0	0	56.25	3rd	Play-offs
2018	16	9	7	0	0	0	56.25	3rd	Play-offs
2019	14	6	7	0	0	1	42.86	5th	League stage
2020	14	6	7	0	1	0	50.00	5th	League stage
2021	17	9	8	0	0	0	52.94	2nd	Runners-up
2022	14	6	8	0	0	0	42.86	7th	League stage
2023	14	6	8	0	0	0	42.86	7th	League stage
2024	16	11	3	2	0	0	68.75	1st	Champions
2018	16	9	7	0	0	0	56.25	3rd	Play-offs
2019	14	6	7	0	0	1	42.86	5th	League stage
2020	14	6	7	0	1	0	50.00	5th	League stage
2021	17	9	8	0	0	0	52.94	2nd	Runners-up
2022	14	6	8	0	0	0	42.86	7th	League stage
2023	14	6	8	0	0	0	42.86	7th	League stage
2024	16	11	3	2	0	0	68.75	1st	Champions
2016	15	8	7	0	0	0	53.33	4th	Play-offs
2017-18	8	2	2	0	4	0	25.00	2nd	Semi-finalists
2018-19	8	2	1	0	3	2	25.00	3rd	Group stage
2019-20	11	5	2	0	4	0	45.45	2nd	Runners-up
2020-21	Cancelled due to COVID-19 pandemic								
2021-22	5	3	1	0	1	0	60.00	1st	Semi-finalists
2022-23	10	6	2	0	2	0	60.00	1st	Runners-up
2023-24	7	2	2	0	2	1	28.57	3rd	Group stage
2024-25									
Total	252	130	117	1	1	3	51.59	3 titles	
Last updated: 18 October 2024

== First-class matches ==
=== Highest totals ===
Score	Opponent	Venue	Date
773/7d	Jharkhand	Just Cricket Academy Ground, Bengaluru, India	6 June 2022
695/6	Gujarat	Sawai Mansingh Stadium, Jaipur, India	7 December 2017
635/7d	Hyderabad	Bengal Cricket Academy Ground, Kalyani, India	19 January 2020
619/10	Baroda	Eden Gardens, Kolkata, India	20 January 2006
583/6d	Rajasthan	Eden Gardens, Kolkata, India	10 January 2007
Last updated: 17 October 2024

=== Lowest totals ===
Score	Opponent	Venue	Date
64/10	Holkar	Yeshwant Club Ground, Indore, India	18 January 1945
76/10	Baroda	Chaudhary Bansi Lal Cricket Stadium, Rohtak, India	21 November 2016
86/10	Baroda	Moti Bagh Stadium, Vadodara, India	15 November 2007
86/10	Delhi	Maharashtra Cricket Association Stadium, Pune, India	17 December 2017
88/10	Baroda	Barabati Stadium, Cuttack, India	17 February 2022
Last updated: 17 October 2024

=== Highest match aggregates ===
Score	Opponent	Venue	Date
1461/39	Madhya Pradesh	Brabourne Stadium, Mumbai, India	3 February 2016
1389/24	Jharkhand	Just Cricket Academy Ground, Bengaluru, India	6 June 2022
1372/25	Rest of India	M Chinnaswamy Stadium, Bengaluru, India	2 November 1990
1284/31	Services	Palam A Stadium, Delhi, India	6 October 2017
1273/26	Gujarat	Sawai Mansingh Stadium, Jaipur, India	7 December 2017
Last updated: 17 October 2024

=== Lowest match aggregates ===
Score	Opponent	Venue	Date
421/40	Odisha	Bengal Cricket Academy Ground, Kalyani, India	23 November 2015
439/40	Baroda	Chaudhary Bansi Lal Cricket Stadium, Rohtak, India	21 November 2016
451/31	Assam	Northeast Frontier Railway Stadium, Guwahati, India	5 December 2008
467/34	Orissa	Kanchenjunga Stadium, Siliguri, India	9 December 2007
521/40	Andhra	Eden Gardens, Kolkata, India	25 December 2007
Last updated: 17 October 2024

== T20 matches ==
=== Highest totals ===
Score	Opponent	Venue	Date
234/6 (20 overs)	Arunachal Pradesh	Barabati Stadium, Cuttack, India	27 February 2019
225/3 (20 overs)	Puducherry	Maharaja Yadavindra Singh International Cricket Stadium, Mullanpur, India	19 October 2023
221/4 (20 overs)	Mizoram	Barabati Stadium, Cuttack, India	21 February 2019
219/4 (20 overs)	Tripura	Tata Digwadih Stadium, Dhanbad, India	24 October 2009
212/8 (20 overs)	Vidarbha	Inderjit Singh Bindra Stadium, Mohali, India	21 October 2023
Last updated: 16 November 2024
