= 1939–40 Ranji Trophy =

Indian cricket tournament

- The Ranji Trophy
- Administrator(s): BCCI
- Cricket format: First-class
- Tournament format(s): Knockout
- Champions: Maharashtra (1st title)
- Participants: 18
- Matches: 17
- Most runs: Vijay Hazare (Maharashtra) (619)
- Most wickets: Vijay Hazare (Maharashtra) (20)

The 1939–40 Ranji Trophy was the sixth season of the Ranji Trophy. Eighteen teams took part in four zones in a knockout format. Northern India who appeared in the previous season dropped out but would return in 1940–41. Maharashtra won their first title defeating United Provinces in the final.

== Highlights ==
- Vijay Hazare topped both the batting and bowling aggregates, emulating Amar Singh's feat in 1937–38.
- Hazare's 316* against Baroda was the first triple century in Indian first class cricket. He scored 151 runs (165* – 316*) before lunch on the third day which is a record in Indian first class cricket, as of 2022. Maharashtra scored 240 runs in the session for the loss of one wicket; their last two wickets added 326 runs.
- Amar Singh scored 113* for Nawanagar v Baroda. He completed his 1000 runs in Ranji Trophy during this match. This was to be his 16th and last Ranji match as he would die in five months. He took his 100th wicket in 1938–39 and thus became the first player to do the 1000 run – 100 wicket double in Ranji Trophy. In 16 Ranji matches, Amar Singh scored 1009 runs at an average of 43, and 105 wickets at 15.48.
- The final was a timeless match. Maharashtra won on the fourth day.

== Zonal Matches ==
=== West Zone ===
Round 1
2 Dec 1939 – Karachi
Sind	127 & 92/3
Western India	266 & 210/3d
18 Nov 1939 – Baroda
Baroda	127 & 166
Gujarat	100 & 141
3 Nov 1939 – Bombay
Bombay	351
Nawanagar	387

Round 2
6 Jan 1940 – Poona
Maharashtra	543/8d & 227/5d
Western India	306 & 84/4
15 Dec 1939 – Baroda
Baroda	399 & 24/0
Nawanagar	233 & 189

Round 3
21 Jan 1940 – Poona
Maharashtra	650/9d
Baroda	303 & 283/5

=== South Zone ===
Round 1
4 Nov 1939 – Madras
Madras	172 & 200/8
Mysore	108 & 263

Round 2
1 Dec 1939 – Hyderabad
Hyderabad	443
Madras	262 & 179

=== East Zone ===
Round 1
2 Dec 1939 – Jamshedpur
Bihar	135 & 111
Bengal	297
6 Jan 1940– Allahabad
United Provinces	326
Central India	64 & 166

Round 2
13 Jan 1940 – Calcutta
Bengal	260 & 163
United Provinces	295 & 124/8

=== North Zone ===
Round 1
9 Dec 1939 – Delhi
Delhi	85 & 138
Rajputana	207 & 17/3
29 Jan 1940 – Patiala
Southern Punjab	205 & 116/5
North West Frontier Province	228 & 92

Round 2
10 Feb 1940 – Ajmer
Rajputana	105 & 133
Southern Punjab	428

== Inter-Zonal Knockout Stage ==
Semi-finals
17 Feb 1940 – Poona
Maharashtra	482 & 203/6
Southern Punjab	429 & 309
United Provinces	Walkover
Hyderabad

Final
24 Feb 1940 – Poona
Maharashtra	581 & 12/0
United Provinces	237 & 355

== Final ==
24–27 Feb 1940
Scorecard

United Provinces	v	Maharashtra (H)
237 (66.5 overs); B. K. Garudachar 63*; Ranga Sohoni 3/32		581 (165 overs); Kamal Bhandarkar 132; Masood Salahuddin 2/90
355 (122.3 overs); Phiroze Palia 216; Ranga Sohoni 3/97		12/0 (1.5 overs)

Maharashtra won by 10 wickets
Poona Gymkhana Ground, Poona

- United Provinces won the toss and elected to bat

== Scorecards and averages ==
- CricketArchive
