= 1938–39 Ranji Trophy =

Indian cricket tournament

- The Ranji Trophy
- Dates: 28 October 1938 – 21 February 1939
- Administrator: BCCI
- Cricket format: First-class
- Tournament format: Knockout
- Champions: Bengal (1st title)
- Participants: 20
- Matches: 20
- Most runs: Naoomal Jeoomal (Sind) (418)
- Most wickets: Amir Elahi (Nawanagar) (28)
- Official website: http://www.bcci.tv

The 1938–39 Ranji Trophy was the fifth edition of the Ranji Trophy, an annual first-class cricket tournament in India. Matches were played from 28 October 1938 to 21 February 1939 with a total of twenty teams participating. The Army and Delhi both returned and were included in the North Zone. The sides were divided into four zonal groups, but the tournament utilised a knockout format. Bengal won their first title defeating Southern Punjab in the final.

== Teams ==
Although the tournament ran in a knockout format, the Board of Control for Cricket in India (BCCI) organised the teams by zone. Delhi and the Army rejoined North Zone although the latter did not actually play a match. United Provinces (North to East) and Rajputana (East to North) exchanged zones. The twenty teams are listed alphabetically by zone and the sides that won each zonal title are in bold.

- **East Zone**
- **Bengal**
- Bihar
- Central India (now Madhya Pradesh)
- United Provinces (now Uttar Pradesh)
- **North Zone**
- Army (now Services)
- Delhi
- Northern India
- North West Frontier Province
- Rajputana (now Rajasthan)
- **Southern Punjab** (now Punjab)
- **South Zone**
- Hyderabad
- **Madras** (now Tamil Nadu)
- Mysore (now Karnataka)
- **West Zone**
- Baroda
- Bombay (now Mumbai)
- Gujarat
- Maharashtra
- Nawanagar
- **Sind**
- Western India

== Highlights ==
- Tom Longfield was the second non-native captain to win the Ranji Trophy, after Bert Wensley in 1936–37.
- Naoomal Jeoomal of Sind scored 203* against Nawanagar out of a score of only 326.
- In the Nawanagar v Western India match, Amar Singh became the first bowler to take 100 Ranji Trophy wickets. This was his 14th Ranji Trophy match.

== Zonal matches ==
=== East Zone ===
Round 1
3 Dec 1938 – Calcutta
**Bengal**	**366/3d**
Bihar	105 & 76
10 Dec 1938– Indore
**Central India**	**170 & 279**
United Provinces	49 & 154

Round 2
31 Dec 1938 – Calcutta
**Bengal**	**378/9d**
Central India	108 & 149

=== North Zone ===
Round 1
12 Nov 1938 – Patiala
**Southern Punjab**	**304 & 221**
Rajputana	190 & 151
26 Nov 1938 – Peshawar
**North West Frontier Province**	**418/8d**
Delhi	207 & 40

Round 2
2 Jan 1939— Patiala
**Southern Punjab**	**379**
North West Frontier Province	227 & 115
**Northern India**	**Walkover**
Army

Round 3
21 Jan 1939— Patiala
**Southern Punjab**	**180 & 120/1**
Northern India	116 & 123

=== South Zone ===
Round 1
25 Nov 1938 – Secunderabad
**Hyderabad**	**382 & 236/7**
Mysore	285 & 111/2

Round 2
17 Dec 1938 – Madras
**Madras**	**159 & 150/4**
Hyderabad	139 & 168

=== West Zone ===
Round 1
28 Oct 1938 – Baroda
Baroda	326
**Bombay**	**441**
4 Nov 1938 – Jamnagar
**Nawanagar**	**238 & 16/2**
Gujarat	105 & 148
4 Nov 1938 – Rajkot
**Western India**	**138 & 180**
Maharashtra	131 & 77

Round 2
5 Nov 1938 – Karachi
**Sind**	**370/7**
Bombay	366
9 Nov 1938 – Jamnagar
**Nawanagar**	**168 & 184/6**
Western India	166 & 185

Round 3
24 Dec 1938 – Karachi
**Sind**	**326 & 263/7d**
Nawanagar	271 & 125/2

== Inter-zonal knockout stage ==
Semi-finals
21 Jan 1939 – Calcutta
**Bengal**	**515**
Madras	114 & 116
10 Feb 1939 – Patiala
**Southern Punjab**	**197 & 168/3**
Sind	339 & 23

Final
18 Feb 1939 – Calcutta
**Bengal**	**222 & 418**
Southern Punjab	328 & 134

== Final ==
18–21 February 1939
Scorecard

**Bengal (H)**	**v**	**Southern Punjab**
222 (83.5 overs); Kartick Bose 48; Amir Elahi 5/73		328 (90 overs); Wazir Ali 222; Kamal Bhattacharya 5/100
418 (146.3 overs); Basil Malcolm 91; Murawwat Hussain 4/97		134 (48.4 overs); Lala Amarnath 37; Tom Longfield 4/48

**Bengal won by 178 runs**
Eden Gardens, Calcutta
Umpires: Nirmal Chatterjee, M. Dutta Ray

- Bengal won the toss and elected to bat.
