= 1937–38 Ranji Trophy =

Indian cricket tournament

- The Ranji Trophy
- Dates: 17 October 1937 – 24 February 1938
- Administrator(s): BCCI
- Cricket format: First-class
- Tournament format(s): Knockout
- Champions: Hyderabad (1st title)
- Participants: 18
- Matches: 18
- Most runs: Amar Singh (Nawanagar) (370)
- Most wickets: Amar Singh (Nawanagar) (24)
- Official website: http://www.bcci.tv

The 1937–38 Ranji Trophy was the fourth edition of the Ranji Trophy, an annual first-class cricket tournament in India. Matches were played from 17 October 1937 to 24 February 1938 with a total of 18 teams participating. The sides were divided into four zonal groups, but the tournament utilised a knockout format. Hyderabad defeated the defending champions Nawanagar in the final.

== Teams ==
Although the tournament ran in a knockout format, the Board of Control for Cricket in India (BCCI) organised the teams by zone. Delhi were absent from North Zone but Northern India returned and North West Frontier Province made their debut. South Zone was reduced to three teams after Central Provinces and Berar withdrew. West Zone had seven teams with Baroda making their debut. The eighteen teams are listed alphabetically by zone and the sides that won each zonal title are in bold.

- **East Zone**
- **Bengal**
- Bihar
- Central India (now Madhya Pradesh)
- Rajputana (now Rajasthan)
- **North Zone**
- Northern India
- North West Frontier Province
- **Southern Punjab** (now Punjab)
- United Provinces (now Uttar Pradesh)
- **South Zone**
- **Hyderabad**
- Madras (now Tamil Nadu)
- Mysore (now Karnataka)
- **West Zone**
- Baroda
- Bombay (now Mumbai)
- Gujarat
- Maharashtra
- **Nawanagar**
- Sind
- Western India

== Highlights ==
- Hyderabad qualified for the final after getting walkovers in the previous two rounds when their opposition failed to appear. The Ranji final was the only match they played in this season.
- Hyderabad's feat of winning the Ranji Trophy after winning only one match is a rare feat: Maharashtra in 1940–41, Bombay in 1967–68, Hyderabad again in 1986–87 and Bengal in 1989–90 all won only one match outright when winning the title.
- Amar Singh topped the batting and bowling aggregates for the season. He scored 370 runs and took 24 wickets in four matches.
- Against Bombay in the decisive match in the West Zone, Amar Singh scored 140* and took 6/22 in the first innings, bowling Bombay out for 45. Against Baroda he scored 66 and took 6 wickets in the match, and against Sind 86 and 10 wickets for 61 (3/35 and 7/26).
- Nawanagar defeated Baroda by an innings and 275 runs, Sind by an innings and 144 runs and Bombay by an innings and 130 runs before losing the final.

== Zonal matches ==
=== East Zone ===
Round 1
4 Dec 1937 – Calcutta
**Bengal**	**372**
Bihar	99 & 107
17 Oct 1937– Indore
**Central India**	**101 & 83/8**
Rajputana	108 & 72

Round 2
29 Jan 1938 – Calcutta
**Bengal**	**110 & 217**
Central India	154 & 145

=== North Zone ===
Round 1
19 Oct 1937 – Patiala
**Southern Punjab**	**216 & 36/0**
North West Frontier Province	165 & 85
22 Oct 1937 – Patiala
**Northern India**	**173 & 180**
United Provinces	115 & 154

Round 2
25 Oct 1937 – Patiala
**Southern Punjab**	**241 & 242**
Northern India	281 & 149

=== South Zone ===
Round 1
28 Dec 1937 – Bangalore
Mysore	180 & 101
**Madras**	**106 & 176/7**

Round 2
**Hyderabad**	**Walkover**
Madras

=== West Zone ===
Round 1
30 Oct 1937 – Jamnagar
**Nawanagar**	**397**
Baroda	37 & 85
24 Oct 1937 – Jamnagar
**Western India**	**108 & 267**
Maharashtra	133 & 164
27 Oct 1937 – Jamnagar
**Bombay**	**115 & 152/7**
Gujarat	166 & 98

Round 2
7 Nov 1937 – Jamnagar
**Nawanagar**	**367**
Sind	112 & 111
2 Nov 1937 – Jamnagar
Western India	153 & 279
**Bombay**	**250 & 217**

Round 3
11 Jan 1938 – Jamnagar
**Nawanagar**	**289**
Bombay	45 & 114

== Inter-zonal knockout matches ==
Semi-finals
**Hyderabad**	**Walkover**
Southern Punjab
**Nawanagar**	**Walkover**
Bengal

Final
22 Feb 1938 – Bombay
**Hyderabad**	**113 & 310/9**
Nawanagar	152 & 270

== Final ==
22–24 February 1938
Scorecard

**Nawanagar**	**v**	**Hyderabad**
152 (54.4 overs); Nariman Marshall 36; Hyder Ali 4/55 (22.4 overs)		113 (31.2 overs); Mohammad Hussain 36; Shute Banerjee 4/34
270 (70.4 overs); Albert Wensley 67; Hyder Ali 5/92 (23 overs)		310/9 (100.4 overs); Edulji Aibara 137*; Mubarak Ali 3/48 (21 overs)

**Hyderabad won by 1 wicket**
Brabourne Stadium, Bombay
Umpires: Dattatraya Naik and Vali Ahmed

- Nawanagar won the toss and elected to bat.
- The match was played in a neutral ground.
- Nariman Marshall and Amar Singh (both Nawanagar) passed 1,000 and 3,000 runs respectively in first-class cricket.
- Edulji Aibara's (Hyderabad) 137 was the highest individual score in a successful chase in a Ranji Trophy final before it was surpassed by Parthiv Patel (143) in 2016–17.
- Hyderabad's 310 was the highest fourth innings total to win a Ranji final before it was surpassed by Gujarat's 312 in 2016–17.
