= 1942–43 Ranji Trophy =

Indian cricket tournament

- The Ranji Trophy
- Administrator: BCCI
- Cricket format: First-class
- Tournament format: Knockout
- Champions: Baroda (1st title)
- Participants: 13
- Matches: 12
- Most runs: Vijay Hazare (Baroda) (398)
- Most wickets: C. S. Nayudu (Baroda) (40)

The 1942–43 Ranji Trophy was the ninth season of the Ranji Trophy. Baroda won their first title defeating Hyderabad in the final. Only 13 teams took part, the lowest in the history of the Ranji Trophy. Teams like Bombay and Madras skipped the competition.

== Highlights ==
- Alimuddin who made his debut for Rajputana in the semifinal against Baroda was officially only 12 years and 43 days old. This makes him one of the youngest first-class cricketers.
- Vijay Hazare took his 100th Ranji wicket in the final. He had already completed 1000 runs in the 1939–40 final.

== Zonal Matches ==
=== North Zone ===
Round 1
20 Nov 1942 – Ajmer
Rajputana	180 & 207
Delhi	124 & 113

=== West Zone ===
Round 1
28 Nov 1942 – Junagadh
Western India	462
Nawanagar	95 & 167

Round 2
18 Dec 1942 – Karachi
Sind	118 & 106
Western India	200 & 27/1
3 Jan 1943 – Baroda
Baroda	308 & 186/2
Maharashtra	262 & 224

Round 3
29 Jan 1943 – Rajkot
Western India	168 & 208
Baroda	245 & 135

=== East Zone ===
Round 1
9 Jan 1943 – Lucknow
United Provinces	212 & 178
Holkar	109 & 282/3
12 Dec 1942— Calcutta
Bengal	312 & 120/3
Bihar	271 & 176

Round 2
6 Feb 1943 – Indore
Holkar	618
Bengal	221

=== South Zone ===
Round 1
9 Jan 1943 – Secunderabad
Hyderabad	260 & 153
Mysore	183 & 68

== Inter-Zonal Knockout Matches ==
Semi-finals
26 Feb 1943 – Secunderabad
Hyderabad	355 & 277
Holkar	268 & 177
26 Feb 1943 – Baroda
Baroda	543
Rajputana	54 & 133

Final
26 Mar 1943 – Secunderabad
Hyderabad	215 & 107
Baroda	308 & 321

== Final ==
26–30 Mar 1943 (timeless match)
Scorecard

Baroda	v	Hyderabad (H)
308 (101.3 overs); Vijay Hazare 81; Ghulam Ahmed 6/114		215 (98.5 overs); B. C. Khanna 75; C. S. Nayudu 6/60
321 (115 overs); Vijay Hazare 87; S. R. Mehta 5/103		107 (64.2 overs); Eddie Aibara 43

Baroda won by 307 runs
Railway Recreation Club Ground, Secunderabad
Umpires: M.G. Bhave and T.A. Ramachandran

- Baroda won the toss and elected to bat

== Scorecards and averages ==
- CricketArchive
