= 1944–45 Ranji Trophy =

Indian cricket tournament

- The Ranji Trophy
- Administrator: BCCI
- Cricket format: First-class
- Tournament format: Knockout
- Champions: Bombay (4th title)
- Participants: 17
- Matches: 16
- Most runs: Rusi Modi (Bombay) (1008)
- Most wickets: C. S. Nayudu (Holkar) (33)

The 1944–45 Ranji Trophy was the 11th season of the Ranji Trophy. Bombay won the title defeating Holkar in the final.

== Highlights ==
- Rusi Modi of Bombay scored 1008 runs in the season. He played five matches and averaged 201.60. No other batsman would score even 900 in a season until W. V. Raman made 1018 runs in 1988–89 by which time teams played more matches.

- Modi scored hundreds in each of the five matches. His scores were 160, 210, 245* & 31*, 113 and 98 & 151 in the final. He had scored 168 and 128 in the last two matches of the 1943-44 season, thus scoring hundreds in five consecutive innings and seven consecutive matches in Ranji Trophy.
- Modi's five centuries in a season was another record. As of 2021, only V. V. S. Laxman (eight hundreds in 1999–00), Kedar Jadhav (six in 2013–14) and Milind Kumar (six in 2018–19) have made more hundreds in a season.

- C. S. Nayudu of Holkar bowled 917 balls in the final, a record in all first class cricket.

== Zonal Matches ==
=== West Zone ===
Round 1
9 Dec 1944 – Poona
Maharashtra	372 & 363
Nawanagar	131 & 115
3 Nov 1944 – Karachi
Sind	264 & 244/4d
Bombay	432 & 16/1
15 Dec 1944 – Ahmedabad
Gujarat	140 & 155
Western India	224 & 271

Round 2
16 Dec 1944 – Poona
Maharashtra	205 & 267
Baroda	314 & 512/3
30 Dec 1944 – Bombay
Bombay	592/6d
Western India	188 & 92

Round 3
27 Jan 1945 – Baroda
Baroda	151 & 390
Bombay	468 & 74/3

=== North Zone ===
Round 1
9 Dec 1944 – Lahore
Northern India	358
Delhi	52 & 86

Round 2
26 Jan 1945 – Lahore
Northern India	449 & 298/7d
Southern Punjab	293 & 92

=== East Zone ===
Round 1
15 Dec 1944 – Jamshedpur
Bihar	158 & 91
Holkar	389
9 Dec 1944 – Calcutta
Bengal	248 & 157
United Provinces	176 & 154

Round 2
18 Jan 1945 – Indore
Holkar	538
Bengal	64 & 176

=== South Zone ===
Round 1
24 Dec 1944 – Madras
Madras	188 & 233
Hyderabad	192 & 176

Round 2
20 Jan 1945 – Madras
Madras	363
Mysore	78 & 159

== Inter-Zonal Knockout matches ==
Semi-finals
16 Feb 1945 – Bombay
Bombay	620 & 58/0
Northern India	363 & 312
17 Feb 1945 – Madras
Madras	254 & 158
Holkar	403 & 11/0

Final
4 Mar 1945 – Bombay
Bombay	462 & 764
Holkar	360 & 492

== Final ==
4–9 March 1945
Scorecard

Bombay (H)	v	Holkar
462 (160.5 overs); Rusi Modi 98; C. S. Nayudu 6/153		360 (117.5 overs); Mushtaq Ali 109; Dattu Phadkar 5/75
764 (256 overs); Vijay Merchant 278, Rusi Modi 151, Rusi Cooper 104; C. S. Nayudu 5/275		492 (155.1 overs); Denis Compton 249*, Mushtaq Ali 130; Madan Raiji 3/133

Bombay won by 374 runs
Brabourne Stadium, Bombay
Umpires: M. G. Bhave and T. A. Ramachandran

- Bombay won the toss and decided to bat
- Timeless match that lasted for six days

== Scorecards and averages ==
- CricketArchive
