= 1943–44 Ranji Trophy =

Indian cricket tournament

- The Ranji Trophy
- Administrator: BCCI
- Cricket format: First-class
- Tournament format: Knockout
- Champions: Western India (1st title)
- Participants: 19
- Matches: 18
- Most runs: Vijay Merchant (Bombay) (553)
- Most wickets: Saeed Ahmed (Western India) (28)

The 1943–44 Ranji Trophy was the tenth season of the Ranji Trophy. Western India won their only title defeating Bengal in the final.

This season could be considered as the arbitrary starting point of high scoring in Indian domestic cricket that would last till the end of the decade. In the final of the Bombay Pentangular in early December 1943, Vijay Merchant and Vijay Hazare scored 250* and 309. It was the prelude to Merchant setting a new Ranji and Indian first class record of 359* for Bombay against Maharashtra between 31 December 1943, and 2 January 1944, at the Brabourne Stadium in Bombay.

== Rule changes ==
Before this season, three days were allowed for matches before the semi-final and final, and, if the first innings of both teams were not completed, play was permitted to continue until a team gained the lead. In the annual general meeting of BCCI in Hyderabad in October 1944, it was decided that matches, apart from the semi-final and final, wouldn't be continued for more than 4 days. If no team was able to get first innings lead in four days, the match would be decided by the toss of a coin.

Four days were allowed for semi-finals and finals. Semi-finals would be played till a team got first innings lead. Finals would be played to a finish.

== Highlights ==
- The Bombay-Maharashtra match set several national records.

- Bombay made 735, the highest score in Indian first class cricket bettering 703 by Bengal Cyclone XI in 1942-43. The previous Ranji record was 675 by Maharashtra v Bombay in 1940-41
- Vijay Merchant's 359* was the highest individual score in India. Vijay Hazare's 316* for Maharashtra v Baroda in 1939-40 was the previous Ranji and first class record.
- Merchant and Rusi Modi's partnership of 371 was a national record for the sixth wicket. As of 2014, it is bettered only by 417 between Wridhiman Saha and Laxmi Ratan Shukla for Bengal v Assam in 2010-11

- Vijay Merchant's season batting average of 276.50 is the highest by any batsman scoring over 500 runs.
- Herbert Barritt captained Western India to the title. He was the third Englishman to captain a Ranji winning team, after Bert Wensley of Nawanagar in 1936-37 and Tom Longfield of Bengal in 1938–39.

== Zonal Matches ==
=== West Zone ===
Round 1
10 Dec 1943 – Jamnagar
Nawanagar	221 & 70/5
Western India	336 & 116/3d
11 Dec 1943 – Karachi
Sind	175 & 83/1
Gujarat	120 & 136
11 Dec 1943 – Bombay
Bombay	487
Baroda	297

Round 2
28 Dec 1943 – Rajkot
Western India	274 & 285
Sind	178 & 158/6
31 Dec 1943 – Bombay
Bombay	735
Maharashtra	298

Round 3
15 Jan 1944 – Rajkot
Western India	363/4
Bombay	255

=== East Zone ===
Round 1
18 Dec 1943 – Calcutta
Bengal	249 & 88/8
Bihar	159 & 261/7d
17 Dec 1943 – Indore
Holkar	222 & 420/7d
United Provinces	116 & 227

Round 2
7 Jan 1944 – Calcutta
Bengal	387 & 21/0
Holkar	138 & 266

=== North Zone ===
Round 1
20 Dec 1943 – Gwalior
Gwalior	92 & 61
Delhi	179 & 393

Round 2
29 Jan 1944 – New Delhi
Delhi	84 & 103
Southern Punjab	388

Round 3
4 Mar 1944 – Patiala
Southern Punjab	326 & 104/8
Northern India	329 & 127

=== South Zone ===
Round 1
31 Dec 1943 – Nagpur
Central Provinces and Berar	166 & 93
Hyderabad	160 & 109
31 Dec 1943 – Bangalore
Mysore	359
Madras	365

Round 2
28 Jan 1944 – Secunderabad
Hyderabad	183 & 141/2
Madras	349 & 191

== Inter-Zonal Knockout matches ==
Semi-finals
17 Mar 1944 – Rajkot
Western India	254 & 175/3
Northern India	145 & 283
19 Feb 1944 – Calcutta
Bengal	235 & 266
Madras	102 & 265

Final
7 Apr 1944 – Bombay
Western India	433
Bengal	234 & 176

== Final ==
7-10 Apr 1944 (timeless match)
Scorecard

Bengal	v	Western India
234 (130.2 overs); Asoke Chatterjee 68; Shantilal Gandhi 6/50		433 (153.5 overs); G. Kishenchand 111; B.K. Mitra 4/80
176 (79.2 overs); Nirmal Chatterjee 71; Saeed Ahmed 4/23

Western India won by an innings and 23 runs
Brabourne Stadium, Bombay
Umpires: M.G. Bhave and D.K. Naik

- Bengal won the toss and elected to bat
- The match was played on a neutral ground
  The trophy was presented by Sir Homi Mody, the President of the Cricket Club of India

== Summary of first ten seasons ==
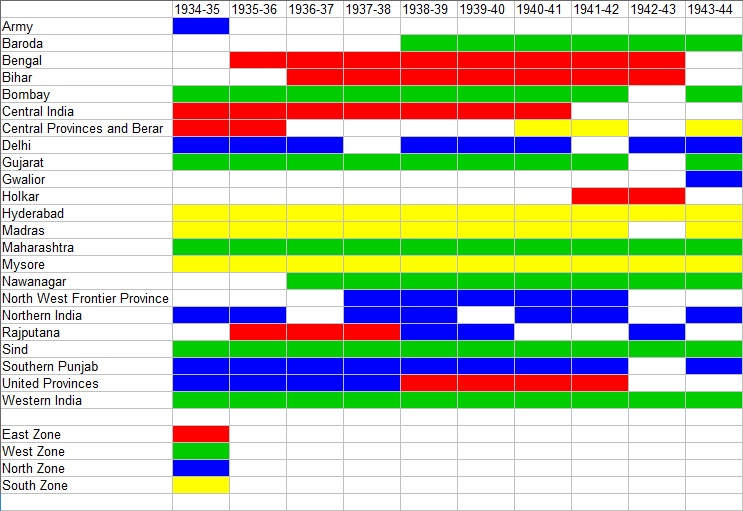
Teams in the first ten years

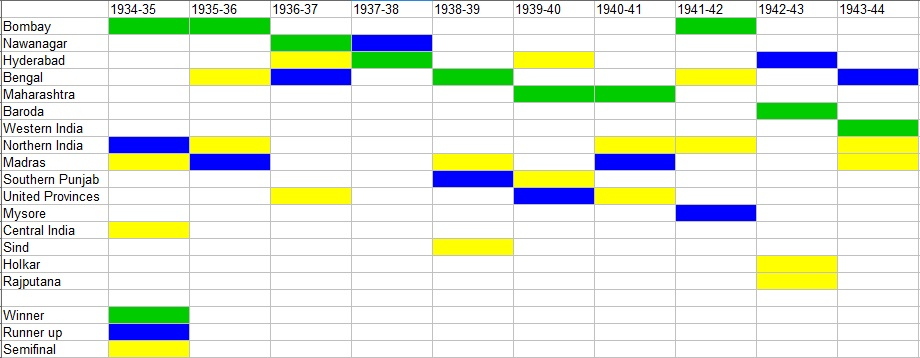
Results of the first ten years

== Scorecards and averages ==
- CricketArchive
