= Abdul Aziz Durrani =

Afghan-born Indian first-class cricketer (1905–1979)

Abdul Aziz
Personal information
- Full name: Abdul Aziz Durrani
- Born: 15 August 1905; Kabul, Emirate of Afghanistan
- Died: 1 January 1979 (aged 73)
- Nickname: Master Aziz
- Batting: Right-handed
- Role: Wicket-keeper
- Relatives: Salim Durani (son)

Domestic team information
- Years: Team
- 1932–1936: Sind
- 1936–1938: Nawanagar

Career statistics
| Competition | First-class |
|---|---|
| Matches | 19 |
| Runs scored | 394 |
| Batting average | 14.59 |
| 100s/50s | 0/3 |
| Top score | 89 |
| Catches/stumpings | 23/11 |
- Source: ESPNcricinfo, 10 September 2022

Abdul Aziz Durrani (15 August 1905 – 1 January 1979) was an Afghan-born Indian cricket coach and first-class cricketer. He played as a wicket-keeper and batsman for Sind and Nawanagar in the Ranji Trophy. He was the father of India Test cricketer Salim Durani.

== Career ==
News of Aziz's skills as a cricketer spread as he travelled to India from Afghanistan to play. He was a part of the Indian team that played two unofficial Tests against the visiting Australian side in 1935–36. After the passing of Jam Sahib Ranjitsinhji, his successor, in rebuilding the team, included Aziz in the Nawanagar team that played in the Ranji Trophy alongside bowlers such as Amar Singh, Mubarak Ali and Shute Banerjee. Impressed by his wicket-keeping and batting performances for Nawanagar in their tour of Karachi in 1935, he was offered a job as a sub-inspector by the then Jam Sahib Digvijaysinhji Ranjitsinhji, which was when the former's family settled in Jamnagar. With Nawanagar, Aziz won the third season of the Ranji Trophy, in 1936–37.

After India's partition in 1947, Aziz moved to Pakistan, while his family stayed in Jamnagar. In Pakistan, Aziz began his career as a coach, working in the Sindh Madrassah School in Karachi. Future Pakistan national cricketer Hanif Mohammad was his student there.
