= Herbert Barritt =

English cricketer

Personal information
- Full name: Herbert William Barritt
- Born: 12 February 1904; Cross Hills, Yorkshire, England
- Died: 26 May 1967 (aged 63); Lisbon, Estremadura Province, Portugal
- Batting: Unknown
- Bowling: Unknown

Domestic team information
- Years: Team
- 1939/40–1943/44: Western India
- 1940/41: Europeans

Career statistics
Competition	First-class
Matches	11
Runs scored	299
Batting average	17.58
100s/50s	–/1
Top score	53
Balls bowled	90
Wickets	0
Bowling average	–
5 wickets in innings	–
10 wickets in match	–
Best bowling	–
Catches/stumpings	3/–
- Source: ESPNcricinfo, 19 November 2021

Herbert William Barritt OBE (12 February 1904 – 26 May 1967) was an English first-class cricketer and educator.

Barritt was born in the North Yorkshire village of Cross Hills in February 1904. He was educated nearby at Keighley Grammar School, before going up to Peterhouse, Cambridge. He played cricket for the Yorkshire Second Eleven in 1926, but did not feature for the Yorkshire first eleven. Following his graduation from Cambridge, Barritt moved into teaching and taught in British India. While in India he played first-class cricket for Western India in the Ranji Trophy, making ten first-class appearances between 1940 and 1944; he captained Western India to the 1943–44 Ranji Trophy, becoming the third Englishman after Albert Wensley and Tom Longfield to captain an Indian side to the Ranji Trophy. In ten first-class matches for Western India, Barritt scored 231 runs at an average of 15.40 and a highest score of 49. In addition to playing for Western India, he also made one first-class appearance for the Europeans cricket team against the Rest of India cricket team at Bombay in 1940, a match in which he made his only first-class half century.

Barritt was the principal of the Rajkumar College in Rajkot and was made an Officer of the Order of the British Empire in the 1945 New Year Honours. He moved to British Egypt in 1947 to take the position of headmaster at Victoria College, Alexandria. His tenure as headmaster coincided with a tumultuous period in Egyptian history with the Egyptian revolution of 1952 and the rise to power of Gamal Abdel Nasser. With the Suez Crisis of 1956 and the subsequent breakdown in relations between Egypt and the United Kingdom, all the British faculty staff at the college were removed from their posts, including Barritt. He later died in Portugal at Lisbon in May 1967.
