= Ernest Burdett =

English cricketer and Indian Army officer

Personal information
- Full name: Ernest Wyndham Burdett
- Born: 5 September 1887; Roorkee, North-Western Provinces, British India
- Died: 13 September 1962 (aged 75); Monks Risborough, Buckinghamshire, England
- Batting: Right-handed
- Role: Wicket-keeper

Domestic team information
- Years: Team
- 1932/33: Hyderabad
- 1931/32: Nizam's State Railway A
- 1911: Devon

Career statistics
Competition	First-class
Matches	2
Runs scored	49
Batting average	12.25
100s/50s	–/–
Top score	37
Balls bowled	–
Wickets	–
Bowling average	–
5 wickets in innings	–
10 wickets in match	–
Best bowling	–
Catches/stumpings	2/2
- Source: ESPNcricinfo, 20 March 2011

Ernest Wyndham Burdett MC, DSO (5 September 1887 – 13 September 1962) was an English cricketer and Indian Army officer born in Roorkee, then in the British Raj. Burdett was a wicket-keeper.

Burdett was the son of Reverend William Jerome Burdett and Eliza Katharine Toye. He was educated at King's School, Bruton. Burdett was commissioned into the Indian Army on 17 August 1907, and his second annual officer's report places him in Allahabad in 1908, attached to 48 Pioneers. Listed in the London Gazette, dated 11 February 1910, as serving in the Indian Army and as being promoted from second lieutenant to lieutenant. He served in the 48th Pioneers. The following year it can be assumed that Burdett returned to England prior to July 1911, as he played five Minor Counties Championship matches for Devon in that year. Burdett served in the Indian Army during the First World War and was listed in the 6 April 1917 edition of the London Gazette, still serving in the 48th Pioneers and having been promoted to the rank of captain. From 1 October 1914 to 15 April 1916 he served in Mesopotamia; he is recorded as being a prisoner of war in Turkey from 15 April 1916. He eventually reached the rank of lieutenant colonel and officer commanding 3/20 Burma Rifles. During the course of the war he was decorated with the Military Cross and later the Distinguished Service Order.

Fourteen years later he made his first-class debut for Railways A against Freelooters. He was dismissed for a duck in the Railways first-innings by Ladha Ramji. In their second-innings he scored 12 runs, before being dismissed by Amar Singh. Burdett made a single stumping in the match, stumping Ahmed Baporia from the bowling of P. Ramsey-Brown. The following year he played his second and final first-class match, this time for Hyderabad against Karachi. In the Hyderabad first-innings, Burdett scored 37 runs before being dismissed by D.O. Daulatram. In the Karachi first-innings he stumped opening batsman Abdul Aziz and caught behind Abbas Khan and Hyder Ali. Burdett scored 49 runs in his two first-class matches, ending with a batting average of 12.25.

Burdett married Hebe Etheldreda Ellen Curwen Collis on 17 November 1919. They had two children: Elizabeth Sylvia Burdett (1921–1984) and Arlingham Jerome D'Arcy Burdett (1922–1995). Burdett spent his later life in England, where on 13 September 1962 he died in Monks Risborough, Buckinghamshire.
