= History of cricket in India from 1918–19 to 1945 =

This article describes the history of cricket in British India from the 1918–19 season until the end of the Second World War in 1945.

== Events ==
The Ranji Trophy was launched as India's national championship following a meeting of the Board of Control for Cricket in India (BCCI) in July 1934 and the competition began in the 1934–35 season. The trophy was donated by the Maharajah of Patiala but named after KS Ranjitsinhji ("Ranji"), even though he barely played any of his cricket in the country. Ranji had died on 2 April 1933. The first winner was Bombay. Since then India has undergone many changes in its cricket history.

== Domestic cricket ==
=== Bombay Quadrangular winners ===
- 1918-19 – Europeans
- 1919-20 – Hindus
- 1920-21 – Hindus and Parsees shared
- 1921-22 – Europeans
- 1922-23 – Parsees
- 1923-24 – Hindus
- 1924-25 – Muslims
- 1925-26 – Hindus
- 1926-27 – Hindus
- 1927-28 – Europeans
- 1928-29 – Parsees
- 1929-30 – Hindus
- 1930-31 – not contested
- 1931-32 – not contested
- 1932-33 – not contested
- 1933-34 – not contested
- 1934-35 – Muslims
- 1935-36 – Muslims
- 1936-37 – Hindus

=== Bombay Pentangular winners ===
- 1937-38 – Muslims
- 1938-39 – Muslims
- 1939-40 – Hindus
- 1940-41 – Muslims
- 1941-42 – Hindus
- 1942-43 – not contested
- 1943-44 – Hindus
- 1944-45 – Muslims

=== Ranji Trophy winners ===
- 1934-35 – Bombay
- 1935-36 – Bombay
- 1936-37 – Nawanagar
- 1937-38 – Hyderabad
- 1938-39 – Bengal
- 1939-40 – Maharashtra
- 1940-41 – Maharashtra
- 1941-42 – Bombay
- 1942-43 – Baroda
- 1943-44 – Western India
- 1944-45 – Bombay

== Leading players by season ==
The lists below give the leading first-class runscorers and wicket-takers in each domestic season.

=== Batsmen ===
- 1918-19:

=== Bowlers ===
- 1918-19

== International cricket ==
India's debut in Test cricket was in the 1932 English season when they played England at Lord's Cricket Ground. England won by 158 runs.

== International tours of India ==
=== MCC 1926-27 ===
The MCC tour was from October 1926 to February 1927. Captained by Arthur Gilligan, the team played 26 first-class matches in India and a further four first-class matches in Ceylon. Team members included Maurice Leyland, Andy Sandham, Bob Wyatt, Arthur Dolphin, George Geary, Ewart Astill and George Brown.

=== Maharaj Kumar of Vizanagram's XI 1930-31 ===
This team, which also visited Ceylon, played six matches in India. It included Jack Hobbs and Herbert Sutcliffe.

=== Ceylon 1932-33 ===
No Tests were played, but India played Ceylon in two matches, both of which were drawn.

For more information about this tour, see: Ceylonese cricket team in India in 1932–33.

=== England 1933-34 ===
This tour featured the first Test series ever played in India. England won the series 2–0 with 1 match drawn:

- 1st Test at Gymkhana Ground, Bombay – England won by 9 wickets
- 2nd Test at Eden Gardens, Calcutta – match drawn
- 3rd Test at M. A. Chidambaram Stadium, Chepauk, Madras – England won by 202 runs

For more information about this tour, see: English cricket team in India in 1933–34.

=== Australia 1935-36 ===
A privately organised Australian team toured Ceylon and India, playing 17 first-class matches between October 1935 and February 1936, including four unofficial Tests.

For more information about this tour, see: Australian cricket team in Ceylon and India in 1935–36.

=== Lord Tennyson's XI 1937-38 ===
Lord Tennyson's team of 16 English players played 15 first-class matches, including five against India, between October 1937 and February 1938.

For more information about this tour, see: Lord Tennyson's XI cricket team in India in 1937–38.

=== Ceylon 1940-41 ===
For information about this tour, see: Ceylonese cricket team in India in 1940–41.

== External sources ==
- CricketArchive – Itinerary of Events in India
