= Basil Malcolm =

English cricketer

Personal information
- Full name: Basil William Malcolm
- Born: 14 July 1912; Worthing, Sussex, England
- Died: 22 December 1995 (aged 83); Matlock, Derbyshire, England
- Source: ESPNcricinfo, 29 March 2016

Basil William Malcolm (14 July 1912 – 22 December 1995) was an English cricketer. He played two first-class matches for Bengal during their victorious 1938–39 Ranji Trophy season. He played in a single further first-class cricket match for a side raised by Homi Maneck Mehta for the Bombay Festival Tournament in 1946/47, when he played alongside Test players Dattu Phadkar and Khanderao Rangnekar.

== See also ==
- List of Bengal cricketers
