= Graham Skinner (cricketer) =

English cricketer

Personal information
- Full name: Alfred Graham Skinner
- Born: 11 August 1910; Calcutta, Bengal Presidency, British Raj
- Died: 19 January 1997 (aged 86); Kensington, London, England
- Batting: Right-handed
- Bowling: Right-arm off break

Domestic team information
- Years: Team
- 1952: Buckinghamshire
- 1935/36–1938/39: Bengal
- 1935/36–1944/45: Europeans (India)
- 1933: Minor Counties
- 1927–1938: Buckinghamshire

Career statistics
Competition	First-class
Matches	13
Runs scored	490
Batting average	25.78
100s/50s	1/1
Top score	125
Balls bowled	822
Wickets	9
Bowling average	52.77
5 wickets in innings	0
10 wickets in match	0
Best bowling	3/44
Catches/stumpings	10/–
- Source: ESPNcricinfo, 14 August 2011

Alfred Graham Skinner (11 August 1910 – 19 January 1997) was an English cricketer. Skinner was a right-handed batsman who bowled right-arm off break. He was born in Calcutta and educated at Oundle School in England.

Skinner made his debut for Buckinghamshire against the Kent Second XI in 1927. He played Minor counties cricket on a regular basis up to 1933, even making two first-class appearances for the Minor Counties in 1933, against Oxford University and the touring West Indians.

While serving in the Raj in 1935, Skinner made his debut for the Europeans against the Muslims. Early the following year he made his debut for Bengal against Central Provinces and Berar in the Ranji Trophy. He would make six further first-class appearances for Bengal, the last of which came against Southern Punjab in the 1938–39 Ranji Trophy. He scored 365 runs for Bengal at an average of 33.18, with high score of 125. This score, which was his only first-class century, came against Nawanagar in the final of the 1936–37 Ranji Trophy. He also took seven wickets for Bengal at a bowling average of 36.85, with best figures of 3/44. Late in 1936 he made a further first-class appearance for the Europeans against the Parsees.

Skinner next made appearances for Buckinghamshire in the Minor Counties Championship in 1938, playing nine times in that season. With the start of World War II, he was mentioned in the London Gazette in June 1940 as having passed out of the Officers' Training Corps with the rank of 2nd Lieutenant. While on active service in India, he later made his final first-class appearance for the Europeans, which came against the Hindus in the 1943–44 Bombay Pentangular Tournament, as well as making his final career first-class appearance for a Services XI against an Indian XI in February 1944. Following the war, he returned to play for Buckinghamshire in 1952, making an appearance each against Berkshire, Oxfordshire and Norfolk.

He died in Kensington, London, on 19 January 1997.
