= Ajitsinhji Ground =

Cricket ground in India

- Ajitsinhji Cricket Pavilion

Ground information
- Location: Jamnagar, Saurashtra
- Country: India
- Establishment: 1908
- Capacity: 20,000
- End names
- n/a

Team information
Saurashtra cricket team	(1933-2006)
- As of 27 August 2015; Source: ESPNcricinfo

Ajitsinhji Ground is cricket ground in Jamnagar, Saurashtra.The ground was established in 1933. It hosted its first match in 1933 when Marylebone Cricket Club toured India and Ceylon in 1933/34. The match was played between Jamnagar cricket team and Marylebone Cricket Club which was drawn. In the match international player like England captain Douglas Jardine, Cyril Walters and Indian fast-bowler Amar Singh were included.

It took four year for hosting its first-class and first Ranji Trophy match which was played between Western India cricket team and Maharashtra cricket team which was won by Western India by 78 runs. Ranga Sohoni took 11 wickets in the match. Since then ground hosted 26 more first-class matches. In 1986, Saurashtra cricket team and Maharashtra cricket team played last first-class match on this ground as match was drawn.

In cricket returned to the ground when Wills Trophy match was hosted between Wills XI and Tamil Nadu cricket team. Since then, the ground hosted one more match in Deodhar Trophy in 2005. But since 2006 the ground has not hosted any of the match.

In 2013, Government of Gujarat declared that the stadium will be renovated with pavilion, Sports Coaching Centre, capacity of 20,000 spectators as well as up 70 meter boundary and four corners of the ground will also have practice pitches and the mandatory parking facilities outside.

== See also ==
- English cricket team in India in 1933–34
