= Dadabhoy Havewala =

Indian cricketer (1908–1982)

Dady Havewala
Personal information
- Full name: Dadabhoy Rustomji Havewala
- Born: 27 November 1908; Nargol, Gujarat, British India
- Died: 21 July 1982 (aged 73); Mumbai, India
- Batting: Left-handed
- Bowling: Left-arm medium-pace, slow left-arm orthodox

Domestic team information
- Years: Team
- 1934–35 to 1941–42: Bombay
- 1934–35 to 1941–42: Parsees

Career statistics
Competition	First-class
Matches	31
Runs scored	1293
Batting average	26.93
100s/50s	2/8
Top score	106
Balls bowled	3824
Wickets	51
Bowling average	36.39
5 wickets in innings	0
10 wickets in match	0
Best bowling	4/46
Catches/stumpings	12/–
- Source: CricketArchive, 29 July 2014

Dadabhoy Rustomji "Dady" Havewala (sometimes spelt Havewalla) (27 November 1908 – 21 July 1982) was an Indian cricketer who played first-class cricket from 1934 to 1941.

Havewala became famous in India before he played first-class cricket. In the final of the Times of India Shield in Bombay in December 1933, he scored 515 (with 32 sixes and 56 fours) as well as taking 11 wickets. It was the highest score in Indian cricket until 2013, when Prithvi Shaw made 546. When Havewala was around 120, a ball bowled by the opposing captain G. N. Lalljee hit the stumps and deflected without dislodging the bails. After reaching 200 he wanted to retire but was asked by his captain to slog and get out. Havewala started to hit out and some of his sixes landed among railway wagons in the Marine Drive yards. He reached his 300 after around a further twenty minutes, and ended the day at 453 not out. A large crowd attended the match on the next day, when Havewala was caught at deep mid off from a mishit.

Havewala made his first first-class century in 1935–36, playing for Bombay against Western India in the Ranji Trophy. Earlier in the season he had scored 71 against the touring Australian side, prompting Charlie Macartney to write, "I have seldom seen finer hitting than that by Havewalla."

Havewala made another century in 1937-38 for Maharaja of Patiala's XI against the strong touring English team Lord Tennyson's XI, and was selected to play for India in the last two matches of the series India played against Lord Tennyson's XI. He made 44 in the first match, India's second-top score in an innings victory. In later seasons Havewala's batting form declined and he played as a pace bowler.
