= 1940–41 Ranji Trophy =

Indian cricket tournament

- The Ranji Trophy
- Administrator(s): BCCI
- Cricket format: First-class
- Tournament format(s): Knockout
- Champions: Maharashtra (2nd title)
- Participants: 19
- Matches: 18
- Most runs: Ranga Sohoni (Maharashtra) (655)
- Most wickets: Chandu Sarwate (Maharashtra) (24)

The 1940–41 Ranji Trophy was the seventh season of the Ranji Trophy. Nineteen teams took part in four zones in a knockout format. Maharashtra retained the title defeating Madras in the final. Maharashtra would enter and lose three more finals but as of 2014, 1940-41 remains their last Ranji title.

With cricket affected by the Second World War, Ranji Trophy was only regular domestic tournament that continued in the senior cricket nations.

== Highlights ==
- Maharashtra won their first four matches on first innings lead and won only the final outright.
- Maharashtra made a Ranji record score of 798 against Northern India in the semifinal, batting for most of the first three days. Originally scheduled as a three-day match, the semifinal was extended to a fourth day for the teams to complete their first innings.
- D. B. Deodhar was 48 years and 306 days old when he scored 246 against Bombay. As of 2014, he is the sixth oldest player to score a double century in first class cricket, and the second oldest Indian after C. K. Nayudu who did it at the age of 50 years and 142 days in 1945–46.
- The Bombay – Maharashtra match was scheduled for three days but went to five before the first innings were completed. Maharashtra made 675 and Bombay 650.

== Zonal matches ==
=== West zone ===
Round 1
8 November 1940 – Jamnagar
Nawanagar	117 & 140
Western India	57 & 203/8
Gujarat	Walkover
Baroda
15 November 1940 – Poona
Maharashtra	675
Bombay	650

Round 2
1 December 1940 – Rajkot
Western India	250 & 159/4
Sind	239 & 168/7d
13 January 1941 – Ahmedabad
Gujarat	335
Maharashtra	518

Round 3
8 February 1941 – Rajkot
Western India	459
Maharashtra	460/3

=== North zone ===
Round 1
15 November 1940 – Peshawar
North West Frontier Province	97 & 88
Northern India	134 & 280
15 November 1940 – Patiala
Southern Punjab	275
Delhi	111 & 106

Round 2
Northern India	Walkover
Southern Punjab

=== East zone ===
Round 1
30 November 1940 – Jamshedpur
Bihar	217 & 58/6
Bengal	257 & 262/3d

Round 2
7 December 1940 – Calcutta
Bengal	147 & 126
United Provinces	191 & 226

=== South zone ===
Round 1
14 December 1940 – Madras
Madras	174/7
Mysore	171

Round 2
30 December 1940 – Madras
Madras	227 & 257/9d
Hyderabad	98 & 132

== Inter-zonal knockout stage ==
Semi-finals
6 February 1941 – Madras
Madras	271 & 158
United Provinces	255 & 149
22 February 1941 – Poona
Maharashtra	798
Northern India	442

Final
7–9 March 1941 – Madras
Madras	145 & 347
Maharashtra	284 & 210/4

== Final ==
7–10 March 1941
Scorecard

Madras (H)	v	Maharashtra
145 (58.4 overs); NJ Venkatesan 31; Krishnarao Jadhav 4/23 (9.4 overs)		284 (87.4 overs); Vijay Hazare 137; C. R. Rangachari 4/71 (20 overs)
347 (129.2 overs); A. G. Ram Singh 71; Chandu Sarwate 6/83 (32.2 overs)		210/4 (70.1 overs); Ranga Sohoni 104*; A. G. Ram Singh 3/54 (21.1 overs)

Maharashtra won by 6 wickets
Chepauk, Madras
Umpires: Vali Ahmed and Dattatraya Naik

- Madras won the toss and elected to bat.
- Indian Express, p.8, and CricketArchive, list M. G. Vijayasarathi as the umpire instead of Naik
