= Cleveland Greenway =

British Army officer and cricketer

Personal information
- Full name: Cleveland Edmund Greenway
- Born: 29 October 1864; Buenos Aires, Argentina
- Died: 17 June 1934 (aged 69); West Wickham, Kent, England
- Batting: Right-handed

Domestic team information
- Years: Team
- 1882: Somerset
- 1895: Marylebone Cricket Club
- 1900–1902: Northumberland
- First-class debut: 4 August 1882 Somerset v Marylebone Cricket Club
- Last First-class: 23 May 1895 Marylebone Cricket Club v Essex

Career statistics
Competition	First-class
Matches	2
Runs scored	31
Batting average	7.75
100s/50s	0/0
Top score	18
Catches/stumpings	0/–
- Source: CricketArchive, 16 April 2011

Lieutenant Colonel Cleveland Edmund Greenway (29 October 1864 – 17 June 1934) was a British Army officer and amateur cricketer who played two first-class matches; one for Somerset County Cricket Club, and the other for the Marylebone Cricket Club.

== Life and cricket career ==
Greenway was born in Buenos Aires, Argentina, on 29 October 1864. He was educated at Cheltenham College where he played for the school's cricket team, appearing against Clifton College and Marlborough College in each of 1881 and 1882. An opening batsman, he enjoyed some success in 1881, scoring a half-century, and narrowly missing out on another. He was captain of the school eleven in 1882. Later in 1882 he played a solitary first-class match for Somerset County Cricket Club, batting as part of the top order against the Marylebone Cricket Club (MCC). He was one of only three players to reach double-figures for Somerset in the first innings, scoring 18, but only scored one run in the second innings of the match.

Greenway captained the first-ever Bengal cricket team in December 1889 when it was formed to play against George Vernon's team touring Ceylon and India. The highlight of Greenway's season in India was the unbeaten 130 that he scored for Calcutta Cricket Club in another match against Vernon's team. Later, Greenway played a number of matches against second-class counties for the MCC. One MCC match in 1895, against Essex, was his second and final first-class game: he scored 8 and 4 in a low-scoring match that was over inside two days. Later he appeared in the Minor Counties Championship for Northumberland from 1900 to 1902. In late 1913, aged 48, Greenway captained the Incogniti team on a tour of North America. He batted low in the order during this time, and did not play any notable cricket after the tour.

On 14 July 1916 Greenway's only son, Lieutenant Thomas Cleveland Greenway, Royal Navy, married Lady Sheelah King-Tennison, elder daughter of Henry Edwyn King-Tenison, 9th Earl of Kingston at St Mark's, North Audley Street, London. Greenway died at West Wickham, Kent on 17 June 1934.

== Army career ==
Sometime prior to 1884 he joined the British Army. On 12 November 1884 he transferred, as a lieutenant, from the 3rd Battalion, Bedfordshire Regiment (later the Bedfordshire and Hertfordshire Regiment) to the King's (Liverpool) Regiment. He served with the 2nd battalion of his regiment in the Third Anglo-Burmese War in 1885–87, and was promoted captain on 19 November 1890. On 15 December 1897 he was seconded to act as adjutant to a Volunteer Force unit, the 1st Volunteer Battalion of the Northumberland Fusiliers. He was promoted major on 21 March 1900, but remained as adjutant of volunteers. Sometime before 27 August 1902 he transferred his regular army commission to the Worcestershire Regiment, and on that date he retired from regular army service, at the same time stepping down as adjutant of the 1 Volunteer battalion, Northumberland Fusiliers.

On 1 July 1906 he was appointed brigade major of a brigade of volunteer infantry of the Royal Fusiliers, and on 1 April 1907 he was promoted lieutenant colonel and given command of a Militia battalion, 5th Battalion, Rifle Brigade (The Prince Consort's Own). Following the creation of the Special Reserve under the Haldane Reforms of 1908 he remained in command when the battalion transferred from the Militia, and was also made honorary colonel. He retained command until 1 April 1913, the end of the standard six-year period of command. During the First World War, he was recalled to service and appointed a Draft Conducting Officer on 23 July 1915, to take a group of reinforcements to France, he arrived in France on 27 July, qualifying him for the 1914–15 Star. He relinquished that appointment on 9 August 1915, and on 7 December 1916 was appointed to command the regimental depot of the East Surrey Regiment at Kingston upon Thames.
