= Abbas Khan (cricketer) =

Pakistani cricketer (1911–2002)

Abbas Khan Lodhi
Personal information
- Full name: Abbas Khan Lodhi
- Born: 1 July 1911
- Died: 27 January 2002 (aged 90); Karachi, Pakistan
- Role: Batter

Domestic team information
- Years: Team
- Sind
- Muslims
- Karachi

Career statistics
Competition	First-class
Matches	29
Runs scored	635
Batting average	13.80
100s/50s	0/2
Top score	84
Balls bowled	–
Wickets	–
Bowling average	–
5 wickets in innings	–
10 wickets in match	–
Best bowling	–
Catches/stumpings	18/14
- Source: Cricinfo, 20 April 2026

Abbas Khan Lodhi (1 July 1911 – 27 January 2002) was a cricketer who played first-class cricket for Sind, Muslims Karachi and India. He usually batted high in the order and sometimes kept wicket.

Khan was one of the leading figures of Sind cricket in the decade before the partition of India. He represented the Muslims in the inaugural Bombay Pentangular in 1937–38. He played first-class cricket from 1937–38 to 1947–48.

In 29 first-class matches, Khan scored 635 runs at an average of 13.80, with two half-centuries and a highest score of 84. His highest score came for Sind against Southern Punjab in the semi-final of the 1938–39 Ranji Trophy, when he made 84 in the first innings at Patiala.

After his playing career, Khan served as a Karachi selector. He died in Karachi on 27 January 2002 after a prolonged illness.
