= Stanley Behrend =

English cricketer

Personal information
- Full name: Stanley William Emile Behrend
- Born: 15 November 1908; Kidderpore, British India
- Died: 30 March 1944 (aged 35); Imphal, British India
- Source: Cricinfo, 25 March 2016

Stanley Behrend (15 November 1908 – 30 May 1944) was an English cricketer. He played first-class cricket for Bengal and Europeans. He was killed in action during World War II.

== See also ==
- List of Bengal cricketers
- List of cricketers who were killed during military service
