= Mubarak Ali (cricketer) =

Indian cricketer

Personal information
- Full name: Mubarak Ali

Career statistics
Competition	FC
Matches	42
Runs scored	796
Batting average	14.47
100s/50s	0/?
Top score	90
Balls bowled	?
Wickets	151
Bowling average	21.58
5 wickets in innings	6
10 wickets in match	2
Best bowling	7/29
Catches/stumpings	25/–
- Source: ESPNcricinfo

Mubarak Ali was an Indian cricketer. He played in 42 first-class matches between 1934 and 1937. He took a hat-trick in the 1936–37 Ranji Trophy playing for Nawanagar against Western India. The three hat-trick wickets were separated by the Nawanagar innings; Mubarak Ali picked two wickets with successive balls in the first innings and the third with the first ball of the second innings.

== See also ==
- List of hat-tricks in the Ranji Trophy
