= 1948–49 Ranji Trophy =

Indian cricket tournament

- The Ranji Trophy
- Administrator: BCCI
- Cricket format: First-class
- Tournament format: Knockout
- Champions: Bombay (5th title)
- Participants: 15
- Most runs: Dattu Phadkar (Bombay) (570)
- Most wickets: Ranga Sohoni (Baroda) (33)

The 1948–49 Ranji Trophy was the 15th season of the Ranji Trophy. Bombay won the title defeating Baroda in the final. The semi-final match between Bombay and Maharashtra was the highest-scoring first-class match of all time. A total of 2,376 runs were scored, including nine centuries.

== Highlights ==
- B. B. Nimbalkar scored 443 not out for Maharashtra v Kathiawar at Poona. It was the second highest individual score in first class cricket at the time and still the highest by an Indian cricketer. Nimbalkar was nine runs behind Don Bradman's record at lunch on the third day but Kathiawar conceded the match at this point.

- Maharashtra's 826 for 4 was the second highest team total in Ranji trophy at the time.

- The Zonal format was not used in the 1948–49 season of Ranji Trophy. It was the only time that this was done until the zones were replaced by the Elite and Plate divisions in 2002–03
- The Bombay v Maharashtra semifinal produced 2376 runs, in the most in any first class match. Bombay's total of 1365 runs is the record for a team in any first class match

- Three batsmen – Uday Merchant 143 & 156, Dattu Phadkar 131 & 160 and Madhusudan Rege 133 & 100 – uniquely scored hundreds in both innings.

- The semifinals and finals were timeless matches. Both the Bombay – Maharashtra semifinal and the Bombay – Baroda final went into the seventh day,
- Three of the four semifinalists were from the West Zone.
- Assam made their Ranji Trophy debut in this season against United Provinces.

== Draw ==
=== Top half ===
Round 1
12 Nov 1948 – Bangalore
Mysore	186 & 122
Maharashtra	327 & 157

Round 2
17 Dec 1948 – Shillong
Assam	153 & 118
United Provinces	368
16 Dec 1948 – Poona
Maharashtra	826/4
Kathiawar	238
21 Jan 1949 – Calcutta
Bengal	251 & 131/4
Bombay	574/5d & 127/2d

Quarterfinals
12 Feb 1949 – Kanpur
United Provinces	131 & 91
Maharashtra	396
12 Feb 1949 – Madras
Madras	331 & 106/2
Bombay	375 & 254/5d

Semifinals
5 Mar 1949 – Poona
Maharashtra	407 & 604
Bombay	651 & 714

=== Bottom half ===
Round 1

Round 2
21 Jan 1949 – Jamshedpur
Bihar	153 & 136
Delhi	212 & 48
3 Dec 1948 – Indore
Holkar	390 & 46/1
Central Provinces and Berar	247 & 317/8d
16 Nov 1948 – Secunderabad
Hyderabad	80 & 80
Baroda	98 & 65/2

Quarterfinals
12 Feb 1949 – Jamshedpur
Bihar	188 & 128
Holkar	328
17 Dec 1948 – Ahmedabad
Gujarat	198 & 94
Baroda	211 & 253

Semifinals
7 Mar 1949 – Indore
Holkar	133 & 240
Baroda	349 & 25/1

== Final ==
18–24 March 1949
Scorecard

Bombay (H)	v	Baroda
620 (253.3 overs); K. C. Ibrahim 219, Michael Dalvi 110; Ranga Sohoni 3/117		268 (145.1 overs); Vijay Hazare 98; Dattu Phadkar 6/49
361 (123.4 overs); G. S. Ramchand 80*; Ranga Sohoni 5/86		245 (126.1 overs); Vijay Hazare 115; Polly Umrigar 4/35

Bombay won by 468 runs
Brabourne Stadium, Bombay
Umpires: Prasad Sinha and M. G. Vijayasarathi

- Bombay won the toss and decided to bat
- Timeless match, ended on the seventh day

== Scorecards and averages ==
- CricketArchive
