= Sorabji Colah =

Indian cricketer

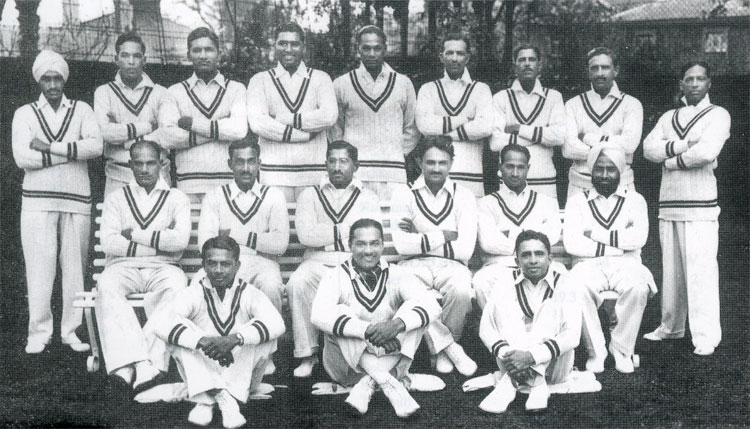
- Colah, sitting on ground in centre, in the 1932 touring team.

Personal information
- Full name: Sorabji Hormasji Munchersha Colah
- Born: 22 September 1902; Bombay, British India
- Died: 11 September 1950 (aged 47); Ahmedabad, Bombay State, India
- Batting: Right-handed
- Bowling: Right-arm medium
- Role: Batsman

International information
- National side: India
- Test debut (cap 2): 25 June 1932 v England
- Last Test: 15 December 1933 v England

Career statistics
Competition	Test	First-class
Matches	2	75
Runs scored	69	3,578
Batting average	17.25	29.08
100s/50s	0/0	6/14
Top score	31	185*
Balls bowled	–	444
Wickets	–	6
Bowling average	–	46.50
5 wickets in innings	–	0
10 wickets in match	–	0
Best bowling	–	2/14
Catches/stumpings	2/–	51/–
- Source: ESPNcricinfo, 9 May 2020

Sorabji Hormasji Munchersha Colah (22 September 1902 – 11 September 1950) was an Indian cricketer who played two Test matches during the 1930s.

Born and educated in Bombay, Colah showed promise at a young age as a good strokeplayer and brilliant fielder. He was one of the players who appeared for India on their first Test tour, to England in 1932. He played in the only Test on the tour, scoring 22 and 4. He made 1,069 runs in the tour, including 900 in first-class matches, but did not have a good relationship with the captain C. K. Nayudu, and it is recorded that on the way back, Colah threatened to throw Nayudu overboard. He also played in the Bombay Gymkhana Test when England toured India the next year, scoring 31 and 12. His other important appearances for India were against the Australian team in 1935–36 and Lord Tennyson's team in 1937–38.

Colah represented Western India States and Nawanagar in the Ranji Trophy and was the captain of the Parsis in the Bombay Pentangular.
