= Venkataswami =

Venkataswami is a surname. Notable people with the surname include:

- K. Venkataswami Naidu (1896–1972), Indian lawyer
- Ramaswami Venkataswami, Indian plastic surgeon
