= Ghulam Mohammad (cricketer, born 1898) =

Indian cricketer (1898–1966)

Personal information
- Born: 12 July 1898; British India
- Died: 21 July 1966 (aged 68); Karachi, Pakistan
- Batting: Right-handed
- Bowling: Left-arm medium-pace

Domestic team information
- Years: Team
- 1924–25 to 1925–26: Muslims
- 1934–35 to 1938–39: Sind

Career statistics
Competition	First-class
Matches	42
Runs scored	677
Batting average	12.08
100s/50s	0/2
Top score	74
Balls bowled	6835
Wickets	99
Bowling average	25.73
5 wickets in innings	1
10 wickets in match	0
Best bowling	5/114
Catches/stumpings	18/–
- Source: ESPNcricinfo, 23 February 2018

Ghulam Mohammad (12 July 1898 – 21 July 1966) was a cricketer who played first-class cricket in India from 1924 to 1939. He later lived in Pakistan.

Ghulam Mohammad was a left-arm medium-pace bowler and lower-order right-handed batsman. After doing well in the trial matches in 1931–32 he was selected to tour England with India's first Test touring team in 1932. However, he took only three wickets in nine matches, and did not play in the Test match.

He took his best figures for a Muslims and Parsees team against the touring MCC at Karachi in 1926–27: 5 for 114 and 2 for 27. His highest score was 74, along with five wickets, to help the Maharaj Kumar of Vizianagram's XI win the final of the inaugural Moin-ud-Dowlah Gold Cup Tournament in 1930–31.
