= Naoomal Jeoomal =

Indian cricketer

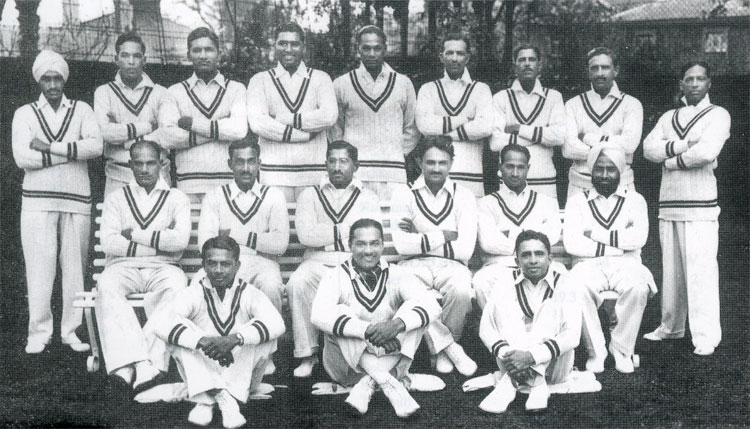
- 1932 Indian Test Cricket team

Personal information
- Full name: Naoomal Jeoomal Makhija
- Born: 17 April 1904; Karachi, Bombay Presidency, British India
- Died: 28 July 1980 (aged 76); Bombay, Maharashtra, India
- Height: 5 ft 9 in (1.75 m)
- Batting: Right-handed
- Bowling: Leg-break
- Relatives: Hari Naoomal (son)

International information
- National side: India (1932–1934)
- Test debut (cap 5): 25 June 1932 v England
- Last Test: 10 February 1934 v England

Career statistics
Competition	Test	First-class
Matches	3	84
Runs scored	108	4,140
Batting average	27.00	32.59
100s/50s	0/0	7/16
Top score	43	203*
Balls bowled	108	5,102
Wickets	2	108
Bowling average	34.00	27.54
5 wickets in innings	0	6
10 wickets in match	0	0
Best bowling	1/4	5/18
Catches/stumpings	0/–	43/–
- Source: ESPNcricinfo, 9 May 2020

Naoomal Jeoomal Makhija (17 April 1904 – 28 July 1980) was an Indian cricketer, who was India's first opening batsman in Test cricket.

== Early life ==
He was born on 17 April 1904, in Karachi, Sindh. He was the son of head clerk of a private company. He was a matriculate. He made his First-Class debut against Arthur Gilligan's MCC in 1926-27 for Hindus and The Rest at Karachi, scoring 16.

== Career ==
Naoomal Jeoomal scored 33 and 25 opening India's innings in their first ever Test at Lord's in 1932. He also shared stands of 39 and 41 with his opening partner Janardan Navle in the two innings. Naoomal was a diminutive, defensive batsman whose strong point was the cut. He made 1,297 runs in the tour, playing in all the 26 first class matches, a decent performance considering that he had played only on matting wickets till then. Wisden even commented on Jeoomal's fielding abilities.

When England returned the visit in 1933–34, Jeoomal missed the first Test. He scored 2 and 43 at Calcutta, but in Madras, he was hit on the face by Nobby Clark. The ball left a half-inch cut across the left eye. The injury ended his innings and he did not play another Test. In his first match in the Ranji Trophy, for Sind against Western India in 1934–35, he scored 63 and 53, despite being hit by Amar Singh and Ladha Ramji, and took 5/78 and 3/52 in bowling. He played in the Sind Pentangular matches from 1922 till 1946, scoring 1,993 runs (average 47) with six hundreds.

His highest score in first-class cricket was a 203* scored in four and a half hours for Sind against Nawanagar in 1938–39. The Sind total of 326 was at the time the second lowest completed first class innings to include a double hundred.

== Retirement and coaching ==
He coached Pakistan in the late 1950s and became national selector from 1957. He also served as an umpire in first-class matches, mostly in the Quaid-e-Azam Trophy. He moved to India in 1971.

His son, Hari Naoomal also played first class cricket for Karachi University and Karachi Greens from 1961 till 1970 season.

Jeoomal was the oldest Indian Test cricketer to attend the Golden Jubilee Test in 1980, which marked the fiftieth year of the founding of BCCI. The oldest living cricketer Cota Ramaswami was absent.

Note : Jeoomal's obituaries in Wisden Almanack and Wisden Cricket Monthly both give his date of death as 18 July.
