= Nirmal Chatterjee =

Indian cricketer (1918–1977)

Personal information
- Born: 5 February 1918; Ranaghat, British India
- Died: 10 December 1977 (aged 59); Calcutta, India
- Source: ESPNcricinfo, 26 March 2016

Nirmal Chatterjee (5 February 1918 – 10 December 1977) was an Indian cricketer. He played 56 first-class matches for Bengal between 1937 and 1955.

== See also ==
- List of Bengal cricketers
