= Session (cricket) =

Time sections in a day of test cricket

In cricket, a session is a period of play during which overs are played continuously until a break in play is called.

In Test matches, each of the five potential days of the match typically comprises three main sessions, usually referred to as the morning, afternoon, and evening sessions. The morning and afternoon sessions are usually separated by a 40-minute lunch break, and the afternoon and evening sessions by a 20-minute tea break. Each of the three sessions is approximately 30 overs long, and is broken up further into two to three minor sessions varying in length, separated by drinks breaks. The exact timing of these intra-session breaks is the umpiring team's call.

In One Day Internationals, matches are played over two innings, with three sessions in each, usually in lengths of 15, 15, and 20 overs. These three sessions may also contain short drinks breaks. Additionally, day-time ODI matches include a lunch break between the first and second innings. In day-night ODI matches, the lunch break is replaced by a dinner break.

Sessions of play often influence a team's tactics for a match, especially as natural light varies over the course of the day, and the pitch wears over the course of a match, whether one-day or Test. For example, teams usually choose opening Test batsmen who can navigate opening bowlers, who often bowl aggressively in the first session of a Test match. Similarly, Test teams sometimes deploy a nightwatchman during the closing session of a day so as not to lose important wickets in conditions that might be difficult for an incoming batsman to manage.

== See also ==
- Cricket terminology
- Playing time (cricket)
- First-class cricket
- Day/night cricket
- Laws of cricket
