= C. S. Nayudu =

Indian cricketer (1914–2002)

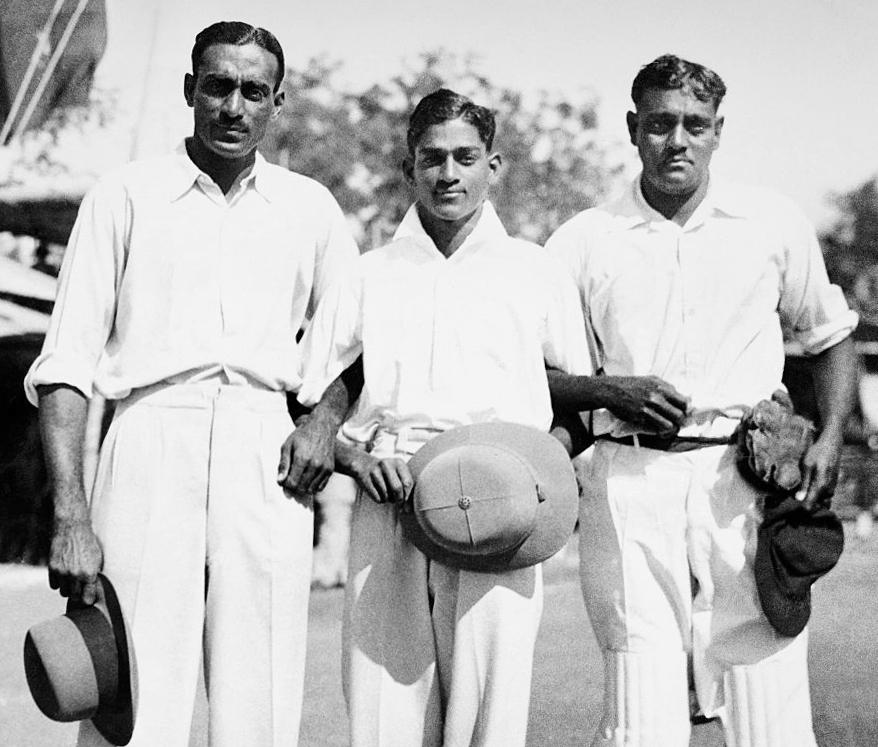
- Left-right: C.K., C.S. and C.L. Nayudu

Personal information
- Born: 18 April 1914; Nagpur, Maharashtra, British India
- Died: 22 November 2002 (aged 88); Indore, Madhya Pradesh, India
- Batting: Right-handed
- Bowling: Leg-break googly

International information
- National side: India (1934–1952)
- Test debut (cap 20): 5 January 1934 v England
- Last Test: 12 January 1952 v England

Career statistics
Competition	Test	First-class
Matches	11	174
Runs scored	147	5,786
Batting average	9.18	23.90
100s/50s	0/0	4/33
Top score	36	127
Balls bowled	522	30,961
Wickets	2	647
Bowling average	179.50	26.54
5 wickets in innings	0	50
10 wickets in match	0	13
Best bowling	1/19	8/93
Catches/stumpings	3/–	144/–
- Source: ESPNcricinfo, 24 May 2020

Cottari Subbanna Nayudu (18 April 1914 – 22 November 2002) was an Indian cricketer who played in eleven Tests from 1934 to 1952. He was an allrounder, and had a distinguished Ranji Trophy career between 1931–32 and 1961–62. He was the younger brother of the cricketer C. K. Nayudu.

== Early life ==
Cottari Subbanna Nayudu was born on 18 April 1914 in Nagpur to a Telugu-speaking Kapu family. His parents were Cottari Surya Prakash Rao Nayudu and Mahalaxmi. C. S. Nayudu's ancestors hailed from Machilipatnam town in Andhra Pradesh. C. S. Nayudu's older brother C. K. Nayudu was the first captain of Indian national cricket team.

== Career ==
C. S. Nayudu played his first first-class match in 1932 when he was 17, and his last in 1961 when he was 46. He played 56 Ranji Trophy matches, representing eight teams and captaining four of them. In the 1942–43 Ranji Trophy tournament, he became the first bowler to take forty wickets in one season in India. In the final of the 1944–45 Ranji Trophy, he bowled a record of 917 balls in one Ranji Trophy match.

=== International career ===
Nayudu made his test debut in the test against England at Calcutta, 5–8 Jan 1934, and played his last test against England at Kanpur, 12–14 Jan 1952
