= Kamal Bhattacharya =

Indian cricketer (1915–1995)

Personal information
- Born: 24 September 1915; Calcutta, British India
- Died: 10 December 1995 (aged 80); Kolkata, India
- Batting: Right-handed
- Bowling: Right-arm medium-pace
- Role: All-rounder

Domestic team information
- Years: Team
- 1935–36 to 1946–47: Bengal

Career statistics
Competition	First-class
Matches	35
Runs scored	1001
Batting average	20.42
100s/50s	0/6
Top score	71
Balls bowled	5540
Wickets	117
Bowling average	19.91
5 wickets in innings	6
10 wickets in match	1
Best bowling	7/83
Catches/stumpings	34/0
- Source: ESPNcricinfo, 25 February 2021

Kamal Bhattacharya or Bhattacharjee (24 September 1915 – 10 December 1995) was an Indian cricketer. He played 35 first-class matches for Bengal between 1935 and 1947.

== Career ==
Bhattacharya was a prominent figure in the Bengal cricket community from the 1930s to the 1990s, first as an all-rounder in the Ranji Trophy, then as a radio commentator and coach. He came into prominence under the coaching of Dukhiram Majumder, and became one of the best spin bowlers in his time. His best innings bowling figures came in a semi-final of the Ranji Trophy in 1943–44, when he took 7 for 83 in the second innings after making 67 in the first innings. His best match figures were 10 for 101 (6 for 41 and 4 for 60) against United Provinces in 1940–41.

== See also ==
- List of Bengal cricketers
