= Tom Longfield =

English cricketer

Personal information
- Full name: Thomas Cuthbert Longfield
- Born: 12 May 1906; High Halstow, Kent, England
- Died: 21 December 1981 (aged 75); Ealing, Middlesex, England
- Batting: Right-handed
- Bowling: Right-arm medium

Domestic team information
- Years: Team
- 1927–1928: Cambridge University
- 1927–1939: Kent
- 1929/30–1936/37: Europeans
- 1936/37–1938/39: Bengal
- FC debut: 4 May 1927 Cambridge University v Yorkshire
- Last FC: 2 June 1951 Free Foresters v Oxford University

Career statistics
Competition	First-class
Matches	82
Runs scored	2,446
Batting average	22.44
100s/50s	2/7
Top score	120
Balls bowled	6,416
Wickets	195
Bowling average	32.90
5 wickets in innings	7
10 wickets in match	0
Best bowling	6/12
Catches/stumpings	49/–
- Source: CricInfo, 28 March 2016

Thomas Cuthbert Longfield (12 May 1906 – 21 December 1981) was an English cricketer. He played first-class cricket for several teams including Cambridge University, Kent County Cricket Club and Bengal.

Longfield was born at High Halstow in Kent and educated at Aldenham School where he played in the cricket XI. He went to Cambridge University and won cricket Blues in 1927 and 1928, making a total of 25 first-class appearances for the university side. He made his Kent debut in the 1927 University vacation and went on to play a total of 40 times for the county First XI, playing his last county match in 1939.

After leaving Cambridge, Longfield worked for Andrew Yule and Company in Calcutta in India, the city where his father had worked for Royal Insurance. He was able to play for Kent only when he returned to England on leave. He played for a variety of teams whilst in India, including the Europeans and Bengal. He captained Bengal to their first Ranji Trophy win in 1938/39, and took a hat-trick for the side in 1936/37 against Bihar. He was involved with the Calcutta Cricket Club and went on to become president whilst living in India, captaining the team for a time and was President of the club three times. He was a major influence in the Cricket Association of Bengal.

In his Wisden obituary, Longfield was described as having been "an orthodox, old-fashioned medium-pace bowler" who "possessed a beautiful action, kept a good length, and could move the ball both ways". He was third in the Cambridge bowling averages in 1927 taking 46 wickets, followed by 44 in 1928, although for Kent he was "curiously ineffective" as a bowler. As a batsman he scored two centuries for Cambridge, the only first-class hundreds he scored, and was described as "a good stroke-player who could score quickly, mostly in front of the wicket" who went on to play "some useful innings" for Kent. He was second in the Cambridge batting averages in 1927.

Longfield's daughter Susan, who was born in Calcutta whilst Longfield worked in India and was a successful model, married Ted Dexter in 1959. He later captained the England cricket team. His brother, Geoffrey Longfield, played two first-class matches for the RAF. Longfield died at Ealing in Middlesex in 1981 aged 75.

== See also ==
- List of hat-tricks in the Ranji Trophy
