= Shute Banerjee =

Indian cricketer

Personal information
- Full name: Sarobindu Nath Banerjee
- Born: 3 October 1911; Calcutta, British India
- Died: 14 October 1980 (aged 69); Calcutta, West Bengal, India
- Batting: Right-handed
- Bowling: Right-arm fast-medium
- Role: All-rounder

International information
- National side: India
- Only Test (cap 52): 4 February 1949 v West Indies

Career statistics
Competition	Test	First-class
Matches	1	138
Runs scored	13	3,715
Batting average	6.50	20.63
100s/50s	0/0	5/11
Top score	8	138
Balls bowled	273	18,839
Wickets	5	385
Bowling average	25.39	26.68
5 wickets in innings	0	15
10 wickets in match	0	2
Best bowling	4/54	8/25
Catches/stumpings	0/–	74/–
- Source: ESPNcricinfo, 10 January 2013

Sarobindu Nath "Shute" Banerjee (3 October 1911 – 14 October 1980) was a cricketer who represented India in one official and five unofficial Test matches. He was right-arm medium pace bowler and a lower order batsman.

== Cricketing career ==
Banerjee made his debut in first class cricket at the age of nineteen and played for an "Indians and Anglo-Indians in Bengal" team against the touring MCC in 1933–34. He took 5 for 53 for a joint Bengal and Assam side against Jack Ryder's Australian team in 1935–36 following which he was selected for the third unofficial Test against the same side (which made him miss the first ever Ranji Trophy match for Bengal) and the team to tour England in 1936. The presence of the fast bowlers Mohammad Nissar, Amar Singh and Jahangir Khan meant that Banerjee did not play in any of the Test matches.

For Bengal in the Ranji Trophy in 1936–37, he took 5 for 33 against Central India and a crucial 47 not out against Hyderabad in the semifinal. Just before the final against Nawanagar, he accepted a job in the state service of Jamnagar. This made him ineligible for both teams for the final. When invited to play for Cricket Club of India against the Lord Tennyson's XI, he took 6 for 89 in the inaugural match in the Brabourne Stadium. Three caps in the unofficial Tests against the same side were followed by ordinary performances.

Banerjee's career best bowling figures were for Nawanagar against Maharashtra in November 1941. He took 8 for 25 in little over an hour and top scored in both innings. He joined Tatas in Jamshedpur in the next year and the rest of his career was spent with the Bihar. A single appearance in the unofficial test against the Australian Services XI in 1945–46 led to eight wickets and a surprise selection in the Indian team to England in 1946.

Unlike 1936 when there were several fast bowlers, India in 1946 included only Banerjee and Ranga Sohoni. Sohoni appeared in two Tests, Banerjee in none. Banerjee made 315 runs and took 31 wickets in the tour matches. Against Lancashire and Middlesex, he took four wickets and both contributed significantly to Indian victories. At the Oval against Surrey, Banerjee went in last to join Chandu Sarwate with the score at 205 for 9. Sarwate went on to score 124 not out and Banerjee 121. It is the only instance of the No.10 and No.11 scoring hundreds in the same innings and as of 2009, their partnership of 249 is the second highest for the last wicket in first class cricket.

Back in India in 1948–49, Banerjee took 7 for 67 in an innings for East Zone against West Indians on a matting wicket at Allahabad and later scored the final runs in a ten wicket victory. This was the only defeat for West Indies in the tour. This led to his selection, at the age of 37, for the last Test of the series at the Brabourne Stadium. He took four quick wickets in the second innings and a hit six over midwicket as India nearly chased down a target of 361. India played no Test cricket in the next three years and the Brabourne Test turned out to be only one of Banerjee's career.

At Jamshedpur in 1949, Delhi went into the third day requiring 46 runs with eight wickets in hand. Banerjee took a hat-trick and bowled them out in thirty nine minutes. Later in the year against Orissa, he scored 43 and 110, top scoring in both innings, and took 6 for 37. Banerjee continued in the Ranji Trophy for another decade but in the later years it involved "more moral than material support". He also gave up the captaincy that he had held since joining Bihar. Bihar were knocked out fairly regularly by Bengal in the 1950s in the early rounds of the Ranji Trophy and Banerjee made his highest first class score of 138 in one such match. He moved to Bhilai in the late fifties and appeared for Madhya Pradesh in his final season (1959–60) .

Banerjee's stock delivery moved in to the batsman on and off the wicket. He developed the inswing after the first tour of England in 1936. He occasionally bowled the outswinger and had a slower ball in the form of a leg break. Banerjee batted in several positions over the course of his career. Though predominantly a tail-end batsman, he occasionally batted early in the order and opened the innings.

== See also ==
- One Test Wonder
