= Lord Tennyson's XI cricket team in India in 1937–38 =

International cricket tour

Under the name Lord Tennyson's XI, a team of 15 English cricketers led by Lionel Tennyson toured India in the 1937–38 season. From late October 1937 to mid-February 1938 they played 15 first-class matches, including five against India, as well as nine other matches. Lord Tennyson's XI won the series against India 3–2.

== The team ==
As England had no Test tour during the 1937–38 season, Tennyson was able to select a strong team.

- Lord Tennyson (47, captain, Hampshire)
- Bill Edrich (21, Middlesex)
- Paul Gibb (24, Yorkshire)
- Alf Gover (29, Surrey)
- Joe Hardstaff Jr (26, Nottinghamshire)
- Tom Jameson (45, Hampshire)
- James Langridge (31, Sussex)
- Neil McCorkell (25, Hampshire)
- Jim Parks Sr (34, Sussex)
- Ian Peebles (29, Middlesex)
- George Pope (26, Derbyshire)
- Peter Smith (26, Essex)
- Arthur Wellard (35, Somerset)
- Stan Worthington (32, Derbyshire)
- Norman Yardley (22, Yorkshire)

All the touring team except Jameson and McCorkell had played, or later played, Test cricket. Ages are at the start of the tour.

The manager was C. H. M. Barday. Alexander Hosie (47, formerly of Hampshire), who was living in India, played in one of the first-class matches.

== The tour ==
For much of the tour, injuries and illnesses prevented the team from fielding its best eleven. Tennyson, who turned 48 just after the tour began and weighed nearly 17 stone (that is, nearly 238 pounds), suffered a severe bout of dysentery early in the tour but returned to the team as soon as he could.

As well as the cricket and the constant travelling across India by train and around the coast by ship, the team were also treated to numerous banquets and were taken sight-seeing and game-shooting. Tennyson recalled that he made 157 speeches, each one as different from the others as he could contrive. The manager, C. H. M. Barday, thought it was the most popular team to have toured India so far, and singled out Tennyson, the diplomat par excellence: "No matter how tired or busy he was, the English captain never refused to sign an autograph, an example which all members of the side emulated, thereby adding greatly to their popularity."
