= Alec Hosie =

English cricketer (1890–1957)

Personal information
- Full name: Alexander Lindsay Hosie
- Born: 6 August 1890; Wenzhou, Zhejiang, China
- Died: 11 June 1957 (aged 66); Ashurst, Hampshire, England
- Nickname: Amrit Lal
- Batting: Right-handed
- Bowling: Right-arm medium

Domestic team information
- Years: Team
- 1913: Oxford University
- 1913–1935: Hampshire
- 1925/26–1929/30: Europeans
- 1925–1938: Marylebone Cricket Club
- 1935/36–1937/38: Bengal

Career statistics
Competition	First-class
Matches	133
Runs scored	6,195
Batting average	27.65
100s/50s	8/33
Top score	200
Balls bowled	636
Wickets	11
Bowling average	45.45
5 wickets in innings	–
10 wickets in match	–
Best bowling	4/35
Catches/stumpings	85/–
- Source: ESPNcricinfo, 2 March 2010

Alexander Lindsay "Alec" Hosie (6 August 1890 – 11 June 1957) was an English cricketer who played first-class cricket in both England and British India. In England, he was mostly associated with Hampshire, for whom he made 80 first-class appearances. In British India, he played for the Europeans cricket team in the Bombay Tournament, in addition to being Bengal's first captain in the Ranji Trophy. Hosie was the chairman of selectors for India's first home Test series against England in December 1933–March 1934. He later served as the president of the Calcutta Cricket and Football Club from 1945 to 1948.

== Early life and wartime cricket ==
Hosie was the only son of the British diplomat and China expert Alexander Hosie and his first wife, Florence Lindsay. He was born in Wenzhou in China, but was educated in England at St Lawrence College, Ramsgate. From there, he matriculated to Magdalen College, Oxford. At Oxford, he was a triple blue in association football, field hockey, and lawn tennis. At Oxford, he made his debut in first-class cricket for Oxford University Cricket Club against Kent at Oxford in 1913. He made four further first-class appearances for Oxford in 1913, in addition to playing three matches for Hampshire in the County Championship. After graduating from Oxford, Hosie moved to British India.

During the First World War, he was commissioned into the British Indian Army Reserve as a second lieutenant in March 1917. Hosie gained promotion to lieutenant in March 1918. A member of the European community in Calcutta, Hosie played first-class cricket in India during the war, playing twice for Bengal Governor's XI against a Maharaja of Cooch-Behar's XI at Calcutta in November 1917 and December 1918, and shortly after the war for Morice Bird's personal team against the Maharaja of Cooch-Behar's XI in January 1919; in the latter match, he scored his maiden first-class century, making 158 runs.

== Post-war cricket ==
=== 1920s ===
Hosie returned to England in 1921, where he was engaged by Hampshire as their deputy-captain. He played for Hampshire on 24 occasions during the 1921 season, 22 of which came in the County Championship. Alongside playing for Hampshire in 1921, he also played for the Free Foresters against Oxford University. The 1921 season saw Hosie pass 1,000 runs in a season for the first time, with 1,041 at an average of 24.20. Returning to India after the 1921 season, Hosie made two appearances in the 1921–22 Bombay Quadrangular for the Europeans cricket team against the Hindus and the Parsees. Over the proceeding two years, he remained in India and played predominantly for the Europeans in the Bombay Quadrangular. Against the Hindus in the December 1924, he made 200 runs in an innings; this would be the only occurrence of a double-century in the history of the Bombay Tournament.

Hosie returned to England upon the death of his father in March 1925. He remained in England during the summer of 1925, playing ten times in the County Championship and twice for the Marylebone Cricket Club (MCC) against Oxford and Cambridge Universities. Following this season, Hosie returned to India. There in December 1926, he led an All-India team in an unofficial Test match at Calcutta against Arthur Gilligan's touring MCC side. Returning to England in 1928, Hosie made 24 appearances in the County Championship; he deputised as Hampshire captain for Baron Tennyson in three Championship matches in 1928. The 1928 season was to be his best for Hampshire, with Hosie scoring 1,187 runs at an average of 31.23, which stood him third in the Hampshire averages that season. During the season, he scored two centuries and made his highest first-class score for Hampshire, a score of 155 runs against Middlesex at Portsmouth. He played additional first-class matches in 1928 for the Free Foresters, and appeared for the Gentlemen in the Gentlemen v Players fixture and for the South in the North v South fixture at the end of the season. He returned to India following the season, missing out on playing for Hampshire in 1929 due to his commitments in India.

=== 1930s ===
Hosie made six appearances each for Hampshire in the 1930 County Championship, and played against the touring Australians; he captained Hampshire during the season on three occasions in the Championship. He also played three times for the MCC in 1930. Hosie played an important part in the administration of Indian cricket following India's elevation to Full Member status of the Imperial Cricket Council in 1926. He was chairman of selectors for their first home Test series against England in December 1933–March 1934, much to the anger of Indian nationalists. He would spend the next five years playing first-class cricket India for a variety of ad-hoc teams, though he did not feature in any Bombay Tournament matches. He returned to England in 1935, where he played his final season for Hampshire, making eleven appearances in the County Championship, deputising as captain for Geoffrey Lowndes in five of these matches. In a span of 22-years playing for Hampshire, Hosie made 80 first-class appearances for the county. In these, he scored 3,542 runs at an average of 26.83, making five centuries and seventeen half centuries.

Hosie captained Bengal in their inaugural first-class match against the touring Australians in December 1935, and subsequently played for Bengal in the 1935–36 Ranji Trophy, serving as their first Ranji Trophy captain. He played for Bengal in the Ranji Trophy until the 1937–38 season, having made six appearances for Bengal in the competition. Hosie played for his former Hampshire captain, Baron Tennyson's, touring team against the Maharaja of Cooch-Behar's XI at Calutta in January 1938, before making two final first-class appearances in England in 1938 for the Free Foresters and the MCC. In a first-class career which spanned 25-years, Hosie made 133 first-class appearances. In these, he scored 6,195 runs at an average of 27.65, making eight centuries and 33 half centuries. He was described by Wisden as "a quick-footed, hard-hitting batsman". As a fielder, he took 85 catches.

== Field hockey in India ==
Hosie played for and captained the Bengal field hockey team in the 1920s. He was a member of the Bengal Hockey Association.

== Later life and death ==
Hosie maintained his connection with Indian cricket into the 1940s, when he served as president of the Calcutta Cricket and Football Club from 1945 to 1948, having succeeded Reginald Lagden. He died in June 1957, aged 66, at Ashurst, Hampshire.
