= Phiroze Palia =

Indian cricketer

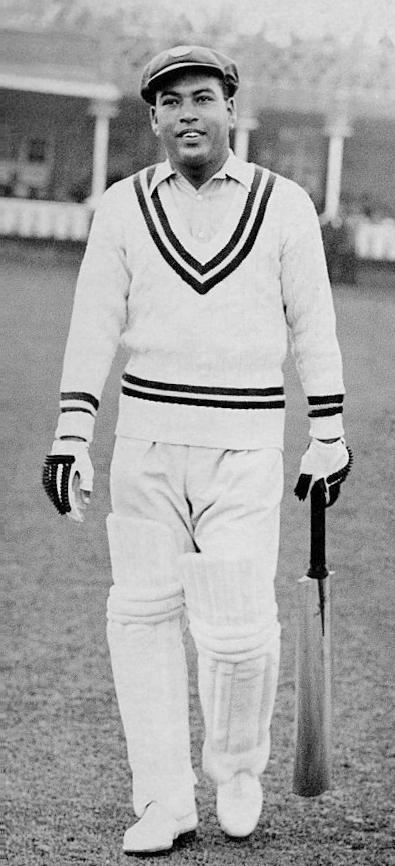
- Palia in 1936, before the start of tour of England

Personal information
- Full name: Phiroze Edulji Palia
- Born: 5 September 1910; Bombay, Bombay Presidency, British India
- Died: 9 September 1981 (aged 71); Bangalore, Karnataka, India
- Batting: Left-handed
- Bowling: Slow left arm orthodox

International information
- National side: India (1932–1936)
- Test debut (cap 10): 25 June 1932 v England
- Last Test: 15 August 1936 v England

Career statistics
Competition	Test	First-class
Matches	2	100
Runs scored	29	4,536
Batting average	9.67	32.40
100s/50s	0/0	8/19
Top score	16	216
Balls bowled	42	13,565
Wickets	0	208
Bowling average	–	24.06
5 wickets in innings	–	7
10 wickets in match	–	0
Best bowling	–	7/109
Catches/stumpings	0/–	40/–
- Source: ESPN Cricinfo, 10 May 2020

Phiroze Edulji Palia (5 September 1910 – 9 September 1981) was an early Indian cricketer. His first name is sometimes written as other orthographic variations including Phiroz. Palia represented India in his first ever Test match at Lord's in 1932. He suffered an injury while fielding. In the second innings he was hardly in a position to walk, but batted as the last man. He again toured England in 1936 and played at Lord's.

He represented United Provinces in the Ranji Trophy and the Parsees in the Bombay Pentangular. His highest score was 216 made against Maharashtra in 1939–40 in a losing cause. He was an attractive left hand batsman and a useful spinner.

For a time, Palia was in the service of the Maharajkumar of Vizianagram. Later in life, he established a timber and furniture business in Bangalore. His father was a prominent figure in the business circles in Bombay in the 1920s.
