= Ranga Sohoni =

Indian cricketer (1918–1993)

Personal information
- Full name: Sriranga Wasudev Sohoni
- Born: 5 March 1918; Nimbahera, British India
- Died: 19 May 1993 (aged 75); Thana, Maharashtra, India
- Batting: Right-handed
- Bowling: Right-arm fast; Right-arm off-break

International information
- National side: India
- Test debut (cap 35): 20 July 1946 v England
- Last Test: 14 December 1951 v England

Career statistics
Competition	Test	First-class
Matches	4	109
Runs scored	89	4,037
Batting average	16.60	28.71
100s/50s	0/0	8/20
Top score	29*	218*
Balls bowled	532	15,634
Wickets	2	232
Bowling average	101.00	32.96
5 wickets in innings	0	11
10 wickets in match	0	2
Best bowling	1/16	7/20
Catches/stumpings	2/–	69/–
- Source: CricketArchive, 3 September 2022

Sriranga Wasudev 'Ranga' Sohoni (5 March 1918 – 19 May 1993) was an Indian international cricketer. He was an all-rounder, who batted well under pressure and bowled relentlessly on South Asian surfaces.

== International Cricket ==
Sohoni toured England in 1946 and Australia in 1947/48 with the Indian team. He opened the bowling against England in the two Tests that he played on the former tour. At Old Trafford the last wicket partnership of Dattaram Hindlekar and Sohoni hung around for 13 minutes to avoid defeat.

== Domestic Cricket ==
From 108 First-Class matches that spanned close to three decades, Sohoni scored 4,307 runs at 28.17 with 8 hundreds. He also picked up 232 wickets at 32.96 with 11 five-wicket hauls and 2 ten-wicket hauls. In Ranji Trophy, his numbers were exceptional (42 matches, 2,162 runs at 34.87, 139 wickets at 24.49). Unfortunately, most of his twenties were taken away by World War II, which saw very little cricket.

Sohoni played for Bombay, Maharashtra, and Baroda in the Ranji Trophy. He won titles with the first two teams and lost the 1948–49 final with Baroda. He captained Bombay and Maharashtra in eleven Ranji matches and captained Bombay in their win in 1953–54. Sohoni played for the Bombay University side between 1938–39 and 1940–41 and captained them in the second of those years. He also appeared in one unofficial Test.

In Ranji Trophy, his finest season was 1940–41 when he helped Maharashtra retain their title. Against Western India in the zonal final, he scored a career best 218* and put on 342* for the fourth wicket with Vijay Hazare, then an Indian record for any wicket. In the last innings of the final against Madras, he hit 104 on a crumbling wicket. He scored 655 runs in the Ranji season, a new record, at an average of 131 and 808 in all first class matches with five hundreds.

== Personal and professional life ==
Sohoni "was tall, fair skinned and light eyed" with "film star looks". He was offered a role in movies by V. Shantaram.

He was a pro in Lancashire League with Lower House Club. He did B.A(Hons) and served in various government departments before retiring as a class I officer in the government of Maharashtra.

His death was due to a heart attack.

In January 2026, an Australian baggy green cap presented by Sir Donald Bradman to Sohoni was auctioned by Lloyds Auctioneers and Valuers for US$ 460,000 plus buyers commission. The cap had been kept under lock and key by Sohoni and his family for over 75 years. https://www.theguardian.com/sport/2026/jan/26/crickets-holy-grail-for-460000-don-bradman-baggy-green-sells-at-auction
