= Albert Wensley =

English cricketer

Personal information
- Full name: Albert Frederick Wensley
- Born: 24 May 1898; Brighton, Sussex, England
- Died: 17 June 1970 (aged 72); Ware, Hertfordshire, England
- Batting: Right-handed
- Bowling: Right-arm medium-fast
- Role: All-rounder

Domestic team information
- Years: Team
- 1922–1936: Sussex
- 1929/30–1930/31: Auckland
- 1936/37–1939/40: Nawanagar

Career statistics
Competition	First-class
Matches	400
Runs scored	10,875
Batting average	20.48
100s/50s	9/42
Top score	154
Balls bowled	73,667
Wickets	1,142
Bowling average	26.48
5 wickets in innings	56
10 wickets in match	10
Best bowling	9/36
Catches/stumpings	265/1
- Source: ESPNcricinfo, 19 December 2023

Albert Frederick Wensley (24 May 1898 – 17 June 1970) was an English first-class cricketer. In 400 first-class matches, mainly for Sussex from 1922 to 1936, he took 1,135 wickets with his medium pace bowling and scored more than 10,000 runs. He spent some years playing and coaching in New Zealand and India.

He did the double in 1929 and took over 100 wickets on four other occasions. His best bowling, 9 for 36, came in New Zealand against Otago in 1929–30, when he played the first of two seasons for Auckland. He scored five centuries, with a best of 140 against Glamorgan in 1928. His fastest hundred saw him hit 120 in 110 minutes against Derbyshire in 1930.
