= Sind cricket team =

Cricket team in India (1934–1947)

Team information
- Founded: 1893
- Last match: 1947
- Home ground: Karachi Gymkhana, Karachi

History
- First-class debut: Ceylon in 1932 at Karachi Gymkhana. Karachi
- Ranji Trophy wins: 0

The Sind cricket team was an Indian domestic cricket team representing the Indian province of Sind. The team played in the Ranji Trophy from 1934–35 season until 1947–48 season in India, before the partition of India.

== History ==
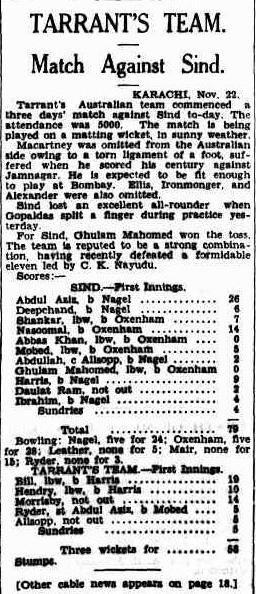
The match held between Sind & Australia in Karachi on 22 November 1935 was reported by The Sydney Morning Herald

The team first played first-class cricket in Ranji Trophy in the 1934 season against Western India team. The team continued to appear in the Ranji Trophy until the 1947/48 season, when it played its final first-class match against Bombay. Following the independence and partition of India, the Sind team was succeeded by the Sindh cricket team which went on to represent the Sindh province of Pakistan.

== Notable players ==
- Naoomal Jeoomal
- Gogumal Kishenchand
- Jenni Irani
- Gulabrai Ramchand
- Pananmal Punjabi
- S. K. Girdhari
- Abbas Khan
- Abdul Aziz Durrani
