= Western India cricket team =

First-class cricket team, 1933–1946

Team information
- Founded: 1933
- Last match: 1946

History
- First-class debut: Marylebone Cricket Club in 1933 at Rajkumar College Ground, Rajkot
- Ranji Trophy wins: 1

The Western India cricket team was active in first-class cricket from November 1933 until February 1946, operating in the West Zone of the Ranji Trophy for twelve seasons. It was based in Rajkot, Gujarat, then part of Saurashtra State.

Western India, captained by the Englishman Herbert Barritt, won the Ranji Trophy in 1943-44.

Western India was succeeded as a first-class team by Kathiawar in 1946, which was in turn succeeded by Saurashtra in 1950. Saurashtra has competed in the Ranji Trophy ever since, winning in 2019–20 and 2022–23.

== Honours ==
- Ranji Trophy
  - Winners (1): 1943-44
