= Nawanagar cricket team =

Indian cricket team

Team information
- Founded: 1936
- Last match: 1947
- Home ground: Ajitsinhji Ground, Jamnagar

History
- First-class debut: Sind in 1936 at Gujarat College Ground, Ahmedabad
- Ranji Trophy wins: 1

The Nawanagar cricket team was an Indian domestic cricket team active in first-class cricket from 1936 until 1947, operating in the West Zone of the Ranji Trophy for twelve seasons. It was based in Jamnagar, Gujarat, then part of the Nawanagar State.

Nawanagar won its only Ranji Trophy in 1936–37 when it defeated Bengal in the final. It was succeeded by Saurashtra, which began competing in the Ranji Trophy in 1950–51.

== Honours ==
- Ranji Trophy
  - Winners (1): 1936–37
  - Runners-up (1): 1937–38
