= Bengal cricket team =

Indian cricket team

Personnel
- Captain: Abhimanyu Easwaran
- Coach: Laxmi Ratan Shukla
- Owner: Cricket Association of Bengal

Team information
- Colours: Dark Blue; Yellow
- Founded: 1889
- Home ground: Eden Gardens
- Capacity: 66,349

History
- First-class debut: Australia in 1935 at Eden Gardens, Calcutta
- Ranji Trophy wins: 2
- Vijay Hazare Trophy wins: 1
- Syed Mushtaq Ali Trophy wins: 1
- Official website: CAB

The Bengal cricket team is an Indian domestic cricket team representing the state of West Bengal. The team is based in Kolkata. It is administered by the Cricket Association of Bengal (CAB) and participates in tournaments organized by the Board of Control of Cricket in India (BCCI). The team competes in the First-class cricket competition known as the Ranji Trophy, the List A cricket Vijay Hazare Trophy, and the T20 competition Syed Mushtaq Ali Trophy (SMAT).

They have been playing first-class cricket since 1935. Bengal have won the Ranji Trophy twice and been runners-up 13 times. They also play in the Syed Mushtaq Ali Trophy and the Vijay Hazare Trophy, both of which they have won once.

Several international cricketers have played for the team including Dilip Doshi, Sourav Ganguly, Deep Dasgupta, Mohammed Shami, Pankaj Roy, and Wriddhiman Saha.

== History ==
Ground of the Calcutta Cricket Club, 15 Jan'y. 1861 H.M. 68th L.I. from Rangoon, versus the Calcutta Cricket Club, a lithograph after a watercolour by Percy Carpenter, depicting a Calcutta Cricket Club match played at Eden Gardens.

The Calcutta Cricket Club was founded in 1792 with membership restricted to Europeans. The team's earliest known match was reported 23 February 1792 in the Madras Courier, Calcutta playing a team from Barrackpore and Dumdum. Eden Gardens was established as the club's home stadium in 1864. It had been a park called Auckland Circus Gardens, named after George Eden, 1st Earl of Auckland, who was the Governor-General of India from 1836 to 1842. It was renamed Eden Gardens in 1841, in honour of Auckland's two sisters.

For the first time, a team representing Bengal was formed in December 1889 for a match against an English touring team at Eden Gardens. At that time, no native Bengalis were involved and the team, captained by British Army officer Cleveland Greenway, was composed of European colonials who were mostly British expatriates. Bengal lost the match, played over the New Year period, by an innings and 17 runs. In January 1923, a Bengal team took part in the Nagpur Provincial Tournament and, having defeated a Central Provinces XI in their semi-final, lost the final against Bombay. The Bengal team in this competition included a couple of native players but, as before, it was principally a colonial enterprise. The Cricket Association of Bengal (CAB) was founded in 1928 and has governance of all cricket in West Bengal, including management of the Bengal team.

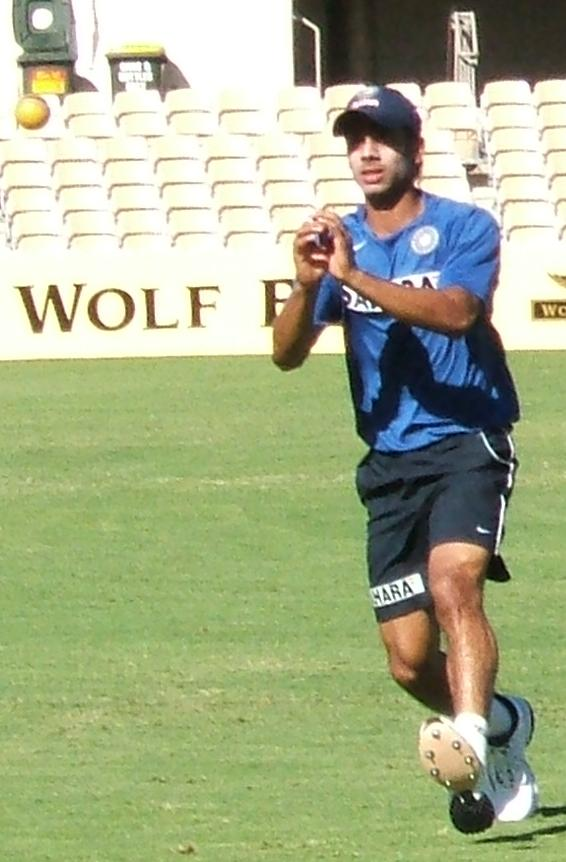
Manoj Tiwary is Bengal's current first-class captain.

In 1934, the Board of Control for Cricket in India (BCCI) organised the Ranji Trophy but Bengal did not take part in 1934–35. Bengal achieved first-class status in December 1935 when they played the Australian tourists. Bengal were captained by Alec Hosie and the team included Shute Banerjee. Although the Australian team on that tour was a mixed bag of veterans and fringe players, they easily defeated Bengal by 9 wickets.

In January 1936, Bengal joined the Ranji Trophy, playing in the East Zone, and reached the semi-final where they lost to Madras. In 1936–37, Bengal were runners-up to Nawanagar. Two years later, in 1938–39, Bengal won the Ranji for the first time when they defeated Southern Punjab in the final. Throughout this period, Bengal was essentially a West Bengal team. They were based in Calcutta and played all their matches at Eden Gardens. The earliest match of note in Dhaka was in February 1941 when a Bengal Governor's XI played the Bengal Gymkhana at the Bangabandhu National Stadium, then called the Dacca Stadium. Following Partition of India in 1947, Bengal was split into West (India) and East (then Pakistan, now Bangladesh).

Bengal won their second Ranji Trophy in 1989–90 when they defeated Delhi in the final. To 2023, In addition to their two titles, Bengal have been runners-up 13 times, most recently in 2022–23, and only Bombay/Mumbai have appeared in more finals.

Having won the Syed Mushtaq Ali Trophy in 2011, Bengal won the Vijay Hazare Trophy in 2012. Playing under the captaincy of Sourav Ganguly, they defeated Mumbai in the final at the Feroz Shah Kotla Ground, Delhi on 12 March 2012.

Author Mihir Bose, writing in 1990, commented that cricket's first secure foothold in India was Calcutta Cricket Club, founded 1792 and only five years younger than Marylebone Cricket Club (MCC). Despite continuing enthusiasm for the sport in Bengal, it is overshadowed by Mumbai as "the centre for Indian cricket". Bose describes Eden Gardens as "one of the great Test match centres of the world", but he laments the relative lack of Bengali Test players saying that only "a handful" has played Test cricket.

To the end of 2023, Bengal have played in a total of 450 first-class matches, 446 of them in the Ranji Trophy. The exceptions are the team's inaugural first-class match against the 1935/36 Australians; Marylebone Cricket Club in December 1951; the Commonwealth XI in December 1953; and the 1990/91 Irani Cup against Rest of India.

== Home grounds ==
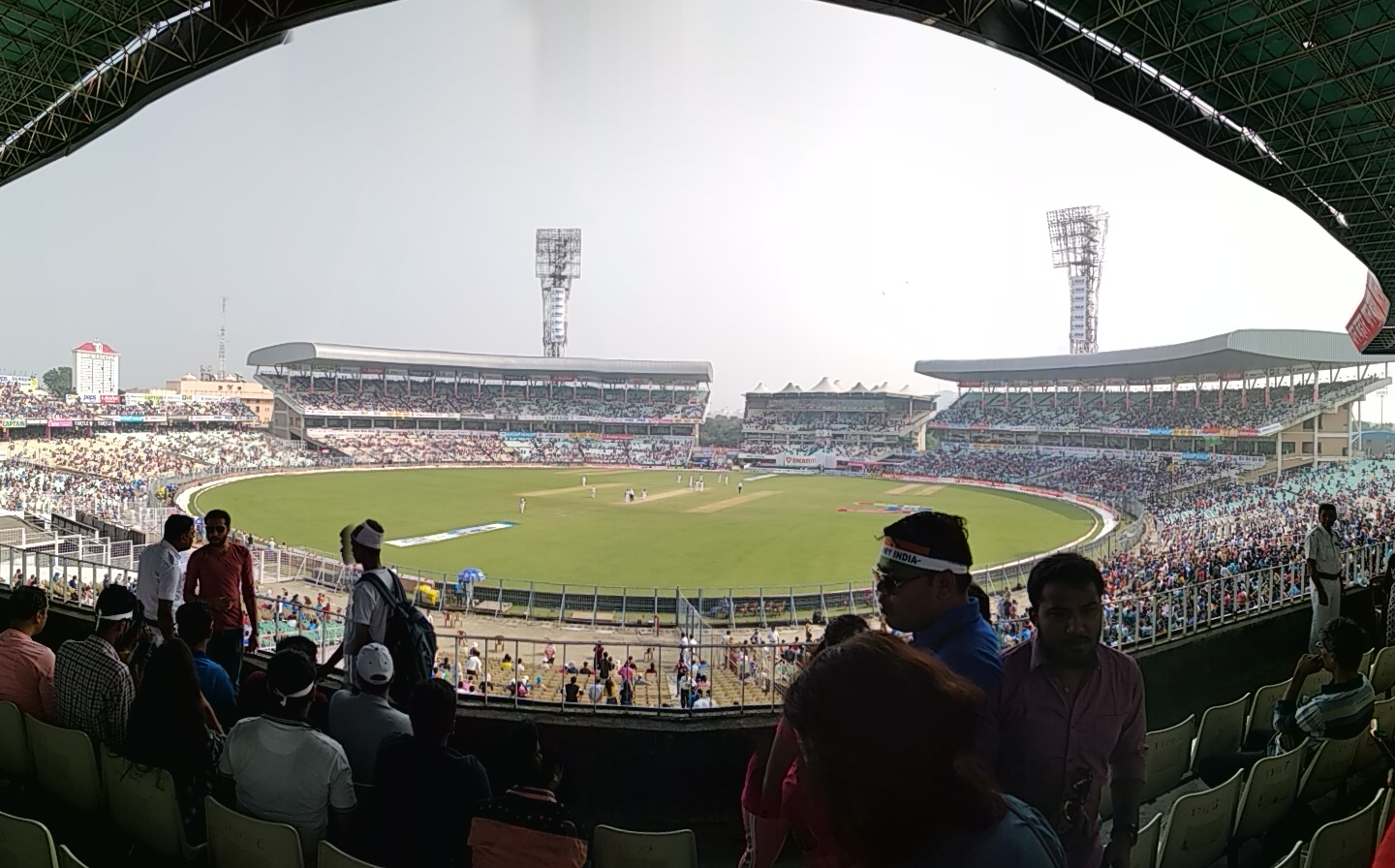
Eden Gardens today

- Eden Gardens, Kolkata – the second largest stadium in India and also the home ground of Kolkata Knight Riders
- Jadavpur University Campus Ground, Jadavpur – leased out to the Cricket Association of Bengal, it hosts inter-state and intrastate matches
- Bengal Cricket Academy, Kalyani
- Deshbandu Park, North Kolkata – hosted matches of Vinoo Mankad Trophy, Cooch Behar Trophy, Vijay Merchant Trophy and Polly Umrigar Trophy

== Honours ==
- Ranji Trophy
  - Winners (2): 1938–39, 1989–90
  - Runners-up (13): 1936–37, 1943–44, 1952–53, 1955–56, 1958–59, 1968–69, 1971–72, 1988–89, 1993–94, 2005–06, 2006–07, 2019–20, 2022–23
- Wills Trophy
  - Runners-up (2): 1995–96, 1998–99
- Vijay Hazare Trophy
  - Winners (1): 2011–12
  - Runners-up (5): 2003–04, 2007–08, 2008–09, 2009–10, 2016–17
- Syed Mushtaq Ali Trophy
  - Winners (1): 2010–11

== Players ==
=== Current squad ===
Updated as on 17 November 2026.

Players with international caps are listed in bold.

Name	Birth date	Batting	Bowling	Notes
Batters
Sudip Kumar Gharami	21 March 1999 (age 27)	RHB	OB	
Abhimanyu Easwaran	6 September 1995 (age 31)	RHB	LB	Captain; Non-international, but has been a standby for India Test squads.
Anustup Majumdar	30 April 1984 (age 42)	RHB	LB	
Sumanta Gupta	9 February 1991 (age 35)	RHB	LB	
Sudip Chatterjee	11 November 1991 (age 35)	LHB	LB	
Yuvraj Keswani	24 December 2000 (age 25)	LHB		
Ankur Paul	21 December 1997 (age 28)	RHB	RM	
Rishabh Chaudhary	5 June 2002 (age 24)	RHB	RM	
All-rounders
**Shahbaz Ahmed**	12 December 1994 (age 31)	LHB	SLA	Plays for Lucknow Super Giants in Indian Premier League (IPL).
Karan Lal	19 October 2000 (age 26)	RHB	OB	Under-19 international.
Vishal Bhati	14 November 2005 (age 21)	LHB	SLA	
Wicket-keepers
Abishek Porel	17 October 2002 (age 24)	LHB		Vice-Captain
Shakir Habib Gandhi	8 October 1999 (age 27)	RHB		
Spin bowlers
Writtick Chatterjee	28 September 1992 (age 34)	RHB	OB	
Pradipta Pramanik	8 October 1998 (age 28)	RHB	SLA	
Aamir Gani	27 August 1996 (age 30)	RHB	OB	
Seam bowlers
**Mohammed Shami**	3 September 1990 (age 36)	RHB	RM	Plays for Rajasthan Royals in IPL
**Akash Deep**	15 December 1996 (age 29)	RHB	RFM	
**Mukesh Kumar**	12 October 1993 (age 33)	RHB	RFM	Plays for Delhi Capitals in IPL.
Suraj Jaiswal	2 December 1999 (age 26)	RHB	RM	
Rohit Kumar	19 November 2001 (age 24)	RHB	RM	
Mohammad Kaif	10 December 1996 (age 29)	RHB	RFM	
Sayan Ghosh	16 September 1992 (age 34)	RHB	RM	
Saksham Choudhary	15 September 1999 (age 27)	LHB	RM	

=== Notable former players ===
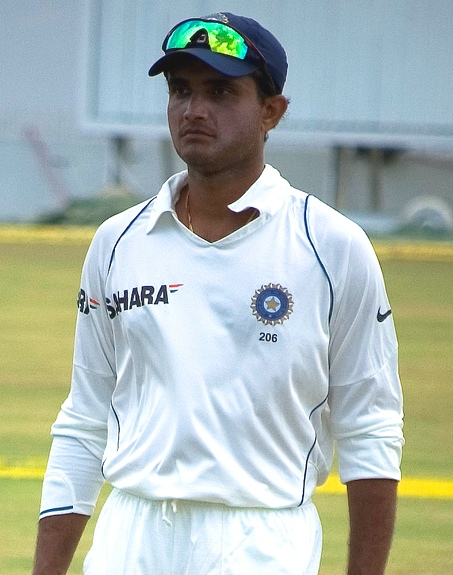
Sourav Ganguly captained India for five years.

The following Bengal cricketers hold team records or have made international appearances in Test, ODI or T20I matches.

- (India) Pravin Amre
- (India) Madhav Apte
- (India) Arun Lal
- (India) Shute Banerjee
- (India) Montu Banerjee
- (India) Subroto Banerjee
- (India) Prakash Bhandari
- (India) Gopal Bose
- (India) Premangsu Chatterjee
- (India) Utpal Chatterjee
- (India) Nirode Chowdhury
- (India) Deep Dasgupta
- (India) Akash Deep
- (India) Ashok Dinda
- (India) Dilip Doshi
- (India) Devang Gandhi
- (India) Ashok Gandotra
- (India) Sourav Ganguly
- (India) Rohan Gavaskar
- (India) Subrata Guha
- (India) Subhash Gupte
- (India) Baloo Gupte
- (India) Narendra Hirwani
- (India) Saba Karim
- (India) Ramnath Kenny
- (Cricket West Indies) Lester King
- (India) Mohammed Shami
- (India) Mukesh Kumar
- (India) Ashok Malhotra
- (India) Vijay Manjrekar
- (India) Vinoo Mankad
- (India) Saradindu Mukherjee
- (India) C. S. Nayudu
- (India) Pragyan Ojha
- (India) Phiroze Palia
- (India) Dattu Phadkar
- (India) Pankaj Roy
- (India) Ambar Roy
- (India) Pranab Roy
- (India) Wriddhiman Saha
- (India) Probir Sen
- (India) Shahbaz Ahmed
- (India) Chetan Sharma
- (India) Rakesh Shukla
- (India) Laxmi Shukla
- (India) Manoj Tiwary
- (India) Prashant Vaidya
- (India) Saurasish Lahiri

== Coaching staff ==
- Head Coach: Laxmi Ratan Shukla
- Deputy Coach & Batting Consultant: Surendra Bhave
- Fast Bowling Coach: Ashoke Dinda
- Spin Bowling Coach: Utpal Chatterjee
- Under-23 Head Coach: Wriddhiman Saha
- Under-19 Head Coach: Manoj Tiwary
- Under-16 Head Coach: Anustup Majumdar

== Notes ==
=== Sources ===
- Bose, Mihir (1990). A History of Indian Cricket. London: Andre Deutsch. ISBN 0-233-98563-8.
- Guha, Ramachandra (2002). A Corner of a Foreign Field. London: Picador. ISBN 0-330-49117-2.
