= 1960–61 Ranji Trophy =

Indian cricket tournament

- The Ranji Trophy
- Administrator(s): BCCI
- Cricket format: First-class
- Tournament format(s): Knockout
- Champions: Bombay (12th title)
- Participants: 24
- Most runs: R. G. Nadkarni (Bombay) (531)
- Most wickets: Salim Durani (Rajasthan) (35)

The 1960–61 Ranji Trophy was the 27th season of the Ranji Trophy. Bombay won the title defeating Rajasthan in the final.

== Group stage ==
=== West Zone ===
| Team | Pld | W | L | D | T | NR | Pts | Q |
|---|---|---|---|---|---|---|---|---|
| Bombay | 4 | 2 | 0 | 2 | 0 | 0 | 26 | 6.099 |
| Baroda | 4 | 2 | 0 | 2 | 0 | 0 | 26 | 1.996 |
| Maharashtra | 4 | 1 | 0 | 3 | 0 | 0 | 21 | 1.038 |
| Gujarat | 4 | 1 | 2 | 1 | 0 | 0 | 11 | 0.575 |
| Saurashtra | 4 | 0 | 4 | 0 | 0 | 0 | 0 | 0.328 |

=== Central Zone ===
| Team | Pld | W | L | D | T | NR | Pts | Q |
|---|---|---|---|---|---|---|---|---|
| Rajasthan | 3 | 3 | 0 | 0 | 0 | 0 | 27 | 2.039 |
| Madhya Pradesh | 3 | 1 | 1 | 1 | 0 | 0 | 13 | 1.192 |
| Vidarbha | 3 | 1 | 2 | 0 | 0 | 0 | 8 | 0.834 |
| Uttar Pradesh | 3 | 0 | 2 | 1 | 0 | 0 | 3 | 0.479 |

=== North Zone ===
| Team | Pld | W | L | D | T | NR | Pts | Q |
|---|---|---|---|---|---|---|---|---|
| Delhi | 5 | 4 | 0 | 1 | 0 | 0 | 40 | 1.629 |
| Services | 5 | 3 | 1 | 1 | 0 | 0 | 31 | 2.479 |
| Railways | 5 | 2 | 0 | 2 | 0 | 1 | 30 | 1.851 |
| Northern Punjab | 5 | 1 | 3 | 0 | 0 | 1 | 11 | 1.090 |
| Southern Punjab (Note: Southern Punjab's matches against Northern Punjab and Railways ware not played.) | 5 | 0 | 2 | 1 | 0 | 2 | 9 | 0.643 |
| Jammu & Kashmir | 5 | 0 | 4 | 1 | 0 | 0 | 3 | 0.196 |

=== South Zone ===
| Team | Pld | W | L | D | T | NR | Pts | Q |
|---|---|---|---|---|---|---|---|---|
| Madras | 4 | 2 | 0 | 2 | 0 | 0 | 25 | 2.302 |
| Hyderabad | 4 | 2 | 1 | 1 | 0 | 0 | 20 | 1.527 |
| Mysore | 4 | 1 | 0 | 3 | 0 | 0 | 18 | 1.827 |
| Kerala | 4 | 1 | 2 | 1 | 0 | 0 | 12 | 0.703 |
| Andhra | 4 | 0 | 3 | 1 | 0 | 0 | 3 | 0.324 |

=== East Zone ===
| Team | Pld | W | L | D | T | NR | Pts | Q |
|---|---|---|---|---|---|---|---|---|
| Bengal | 3 | 2 | 0 | 1 | 0 | 0 | 24 | 4.300 |
| Bihar | 3 | 1 | 0 | 2 | 0 | 0 | 14 | 0.700 |
| Orissa | 3 | 0 | 1 | 2 | 0 | 0 | 8 | 0.799 |
| Assam | 3 | 0 | 2 | 1 | 0 | 0 | 5 | 0.546 |

== Knockout stage ==
Quarter-finals
21 Jan 1961 – Calcutta
Bengal | 297 & 38/0
Delhi | 307 & 210

Semi-finals
25 Feb 1961 – Madras
Madras | 328 & 116
Rajasthan | 301 & 210
24 Feb 1961 – Bombay
Bombay | 527
Delhi | 132 & 192

Final
8 Mar 1961 – Udaipur
Rajasthan | 140 & 249
Bombay | 346 & 44/3

=== Final ===
8–10 Mar 1961
Scorecard

| Rajasthan (H) | v | Bombay |
| 140 (44 overs); Vijay Manjrekar 40; Ramakant Desai 7/46 | | 346 (80.5 overs); G. S. Ramchand 118; Salim Durani 8/99 |
| 249 (78.2 overs); Vijay Manjrekar 68; Ramakant Desai 4/74 | | 44/3 (9.3 overs); Manohar Hardikar 18*; Raj Singh 2/20 |

Bombay won 7 wickets
Bhupal Noble's College Ground, Udaipur
Umpires: Sukken Bhattacharya and K. B. Saxena

- Rajasthan won the toss and elected to bat

== Scorecards and averages ==
- CricketArchive
