= 1951–52 Ranji Trophy =

Indian cricket tournament

- The Ranji Trophy
- Administrator(s): BCCI
- Cricket format: First-class
- Tournament format(s): Knockout
- Champions: Bombay (6th title)
- Participants: 21
- Most runs: Hemu Adhikari (Services) (554)
- Most wickets: Dattu Phadkar (Bombay) (32)

The 1951–52 Ranji Trophy was the 18th season of the Ranji Trophy. Bombay won the title defeating Holkar in the final.

== Highlights ==
- Mysore lost by an innings and 7 runs to Bombay despite conceding a first innings lead of only 35. The second innings total of 28 all out is the lowest total by Mysore/Karnataka in first class cricket.
- Bombay defeated Holkar by 531 runs in the final. As of 2020, it is the second largest margin of win by runs in Ranji Trophy, after Bengal's 540 run win over Orissa in 1953–54

== Zonal Matches ==
=== West Zone ===
Round 1
16 Nov 1951 – Kolhapur
Maharashtra	251 & 114/6
Baroda	111 & 352/6d

Round 2
24 Nov 1951 – Bombay
Bombay	467
Saurashtra	119 & 25
1 Dec 1951 – Kolhapur
Maharashtra	272 & 25/0
Gujarat	629 & 167/9d

Round 3
21 Jan 1952 – Bombay
Bombay	506
Gujarat	146 & 236

=== North Zone ===
Round 1
16 Nov 1951 – Delhi
Delhi	231/9d & 132/4
Eastern Punjab	380 & 172/9d

Round 2
8 Dec 1951 – Ajmer
Rajasthan	83 & 167
Services	423/5d
8 Dec 1951 – Patiala
Southern Punjab	376/5d & 8/0
Eastern Punjab	128 & 254

Round 3
21 Jan 1952 – Delhi
Services	290 & 412
Southern Punjab	189 & 363

=== South Zone ===
Round 1
8 Dec 1951 – Bangalore
Mysore	322
Travancore-Cochin	150 & 85

Round 2
23 Dec 1951 – Madras
Madras	405 & 56/0
Madhya Pradesh	268 & 189
22 Dec 1951 – Bangalore
Mysore	344 & 402/4d
Hyderabad	126/9d & 198

Round 3
25 Jan 1952 – Madras
Madras	194 & 151
Mysore	228 & 291

=== East Zone ===
Round 1
14 Dec 1951 – Kanpur
Uttar Pradesh	178 & 180
Bihar	223 & 136/6
15 Dec 1951 – Nowgong
Assam	116 & 278/6d
Orissa	177 & 144

Round 2
21 Dec 1951 – Jamshedpur
Bihar	98 & 259
Holkar	344 & 15/1
24 Jan 1952 – Calcutta
Bengal	760
Assam	180 & 167

Round 3
30 Jan 1952 – Indore
Holkar	367 & 129/3
Bengal	180 & 315

== Inter-Zonal Knockout matches ==
Semi-finals
22 Feb 1952 – Bangalore
Mysore	170 & 28
Bombay	205
22 Feb 1952 – Indore
Holkar	219 & 485
Services	196 & 250

Final
1 Mar 1952 – Bombay
Bombay	596 & 442/5d
Holkar	410 & 97

=== Final ===
1–5 March 1952
Scorecard

Bombay (H)	v	Holkar
596 (154.1 overs); G. S. Ramchand 149, Vinoo Mankad 141; C. K. Nayudu 2/72		410 (138.3 overs); Chandu Sarwate 70; Dattu Phadkar 7/109
442 for 5 decl (118.1 overs); Madhav Mantri 152; Chandu Sarwate 2/106		97 (46 overs); Mushtaq Ali 30; Vinoo Mankad 4/21

Bombay won by 531 runs
Brabourne Stadium, Bombay
Umpires: Balkrishna Mohoni and M. G. Vijayasarathi

- Bombay won the toss and decided to bat

== Scorecards and averages ==
- CricketArchive
