= 1964–65 Ranji Trophy =

Indian cricket tournament

- The Ranji Trophy
- Administrator: BCCI
- Cricket format: First-class
- Tournament format(s): League and knockout
- Champions: Bombay (16th title)
- Participants: 24
- Most runs: M. L. Jaisimha (Hyderabad) (713)
- Most wickets: M. Jairam (Hyderabad) (34)

The 1964–65 Ranji Trophy was the 31st season of the Ranji Trophy, the premier first-class cricket tournament that took place in India between September 1965 and April 1965. Bombay won their seventh consecutive title defeating Hyderabad in the final.

== Highlights ==
- Mysore was out for 46 against Madras, their lowest score since being out for 28 against Bombay in 1951–52 (as of 2020).

== Group stage ==
=== South Zone ===
Team	Pld	W	L	D	T	NR	Pts	Q
Hyderabad	4	3	0	1	0	0	30	1.733
Madras	4	3	0	1	0	0	28	1.600
Mysore	4	2	2	0	0	0	16	1.370
Andhra	4	1	3	0	0	0	8	0.722
Kerala	4	0	4	0	0	0	0	0.403

=== North Zone ===
Team	Pld	W	L	D	T	NR	Pts	Q
Services	5	3	0	2	0	0	34	1.470
Delhi	5	3	0	2	0	0	33	2.091
Railways	5	2	1	2	0	0	24	1.356
Southern Punjab	5	0	2	3	0	0	15	0.868
Northern Punjab	5	0	2	3	0	0	13	0.581
Jammu & Kashmir	5	0	3	2	0	0	6	0.451

=== East Zone ===
Team	Pld	W	L	D	T	NR	Pts	Q
Bengal	3	1	0	2	0	0	18	1.401
Bihar	3	1	0	2	0	0	14	0.970
Assam	3	0	1	2	0	0	10	0.852
Orissa	3	0	1	2	0	0	6	0.880

=== West Zone ===
Team	Pld	W	L	D	T	NR	Pts	Q
Bombay	4	2	0	2	0	0	25	1.925
Maharashtra	4	2	0	2	0	0	25	1.415
Baroda	4	0	0	4	0	0	18	0.875
Gujarat	4	0	2	2	0	0	8	0.611
Saurashtra	4	0	2	2	0	0	6	0.651

=== Central Zone ===
Team	Pld	W	L	D	T	NR	Pts	Q
Uttar Pradesh	3	1	0	2	0	0	16	1.071
Vidarbha	3	1	0	2	0	0	16	0.956
Rajasthan	3	0	0	3	0	0	14	1.247
Madhya Pradesh	3	0	2	1	0	0	3	0.823

== Knockout stage ==
Quarter-finals
13 Feb 1965 – Secunderabad
Hyderabad	635
Bengal	219 & 229

Semi-finals
27 Mar 1965 – Hyderabad
Hyderabad	615
Uttar Pradesh	191 & 301
19 Feb 1965 – Bombay
Bombay	482/6d & 54/1
Services	121 & 414

Final
3 April 1965 – Hyderabad
Hyderabad	235 & 235
Bombay	596

=== Final ===
Hyderabad made two changes in their side that beat Uttar Pradesh in the semi-final. All-rounder Iftikharuddin and Sultan Saleem were included in place of R. H. Sabir and Kaleem-ul-Haq.

3–6 April 1965
Scorecard

Bombay	v	Hyderabad (H)
596 (160.3 overs); Bapu Nadkarni 194; Abid Ali 3/132 (36 overs)		235 (97.1 overs); Waheed Yar Khan 78; Baloo Gupte 5/62 (23.1 overs)
		235 f/o (131 overs); Habib Ahmed 46; Ramakant Desai 3/30 (22 overs)

Bombay won by an innings and 126 runs
Fateh Maidan, Hyderabad
Umpires: Sunil Banerjee and V. Rajagopal

- Bombay won the toss and elected to bat.
- Shankar More made his debut for Bombay in first-class matches.
- Farokh Engineer and Sharad Diwadkar passed 1,000 runs, while Bapu Nadkarni (all Bombay) passed 7,000 runs in first-class matches.
