= 1965–66 Ranji Trophy =

Indian cricket tournament

- The Ranji Trophy
- Administrator: BCCI
- Cricket format: First-class
- Tournament format(s): League and knockout
- Champions: Bombay (17th title)
- Participants: 24
- Most runs: Ajit Wadekar (Bombay) (695)
- Most wickets: B. S. Chandrasekhar (Mysore) (37)

The 1965–66 Ranji Trophy was the 32nd season of the Ranji Trophy. Bombay won the title defeating Rajasthan in the final.

== Highlights ==
- R. G. Nadkarni captained Bombay to a win for the third season in a row. As of 2017, he is the only captain to win three consecutive Ranji titles.
- Ravinder Pal took a hat-trick for Delhi v Southern Punjab. This match was the first first class match played at Sector 16 Stadium, Chandigarh

== Group stage ==
=== West Zone ===
Team	Pld	W	L	D	T	NR	Pts	Q
Bombay	4	2	0	2	0	0	29	2.039
Maharashtra	4	2	0	2	0	0	24	1.353
Baroda	4	0	0	4	0	0	16	0.899
Gujarat	4	1	2	1	0	0	11	0.807
Saurashtra	4	0	3	1	0	0	3	0.527

=== North Zone ===
Team	Pld	W	L	D	T	NR	Pts	Q
Services	5	3	0	2	0	0	36	1.909
Railways	5	3	0	2	0	0	32	1.645
Delhi	5	1	0	4	0	0	24	1.270
Southern Punjab	5	2	2	1	0	0	21	1.023
Northern Punjab	5	1	3	1	0	0	11	0.730
Jammu & Kashmir	5	0	5	0	0	0	0	0.305

=== East Zone ===
Team	Pld	W	L	D	T	NR	Pts	Q
Bengal	3	2	0	1	0	0	19	2.415
Bihar	3	1	1	1	0	0	11	1.039
Orissa	3	1	1	1	0	0	11	0.918
Assam	3	0	2	1	0	0	5	0.566

=== South Zone ===
Team	Pld	W	L	D	T	NR	Pts	Q
Mysore	4	3	0	1	0	0	31	2.423
Hyderabad	4	2	0	2	0	0	26	2.101
Madras	4	1	1	2	0	0	17	1.147
Kerala	4	1	2	1	0	0	11	0.381
Andhra	4	0	4	0	0	0	0	0.360

=== Central Zone ===
Team	Pld	W	L	D	T	NR	Pts	Q
Rajasthan	3	2	0	1	0	0	22	1.873
Uttar Pradesh	3	0	0	3	0	0	9	0.597
Madhya Pradesh	3	0	1	2	0	0	8	0.994
Vidarbha	3	0	1	2	0	0	8	0.786

== Knockout stage ==
Quarter-finals
28 Jan 1966 – Jaipur
Rajasthan	330 & 97/3
Services	156 & 268

Semi-finals
5 Feb 1966 – Bangalore
Mysore	397 & 243/7d
Rajasthan	458 & 183/9
29 Jan 1966 – Bombay
Bombay	254 & 109/1
Bengal	109 & 252

Final
17 Feb 1966 – Jaipur
Rajasthan	125 & 288
Bombay	382 & 32/2

=== Final ===
17–20 February 1966
Scorecard

Rajasthan (H)	v	Bombay
125 (56.5 overs); Salim Durani 29; Manohar Hardikar 6/25		382 (112.3 overs); Ajit Wadekar 185; Chandrasekhar Joshi 6/83
288 (137 overs); Kailash Gattani 94; G. R. Sunderam 2/3		32/2 (6.4 overs); Ajit Wadekar 22*; Ramakant Desai 4/72

Bombay won by eight wickets
Railway Cricket Ground, Jaipur
Umpires: Sunil Banerjee and Samar Roy

- Bombay won the toss and decided to field
- The match was played on a coir matting wicket.
- Wadekar (185) and Dilip Sardesai (99) added 212 runs in 220 minutes. Sardesai spent half an hour in the nineties, was dropped at extra cover and then stumped for 99 in 300 minutes with 9 fours. Wadekar hit 26 fours and a six off Sunderam.
- The Ranji trophy was presented by Gayatri Devi of Jaipur

== Scorecards and averages ==
- ESPNcricinfo
- CricketArchive
