= 1959–60 Ranji Trophy =

Indian cricket tournament

- The Ranji Trophy
- Administrator(s): BCCI
- Cricket format: First-class
- Tournament format(s): Knockout
- Champions: Bombay (11th title)
- Participants: 24
- Most runs: Rusi Surti (Rajasthan) (539)
- Most wickets: B. Y. Alva (Mysore) (36)

The 1959–60 Ranji Trophy was the 26th season of the Ranji Trophy. Bombay won the title defeating Mysore in the final.

== Highlights ==
- Asif Iqbal made his first class debut for Hyderabad against Kerala. He moved to Pakistan two years later and captained them in Test cricket.

== Group stage ==
=== South Zone ===
Team	Pld	W	L	D	T	NR	Pts	Q
Mysore	4	4	0	0	0	0	34	2.184
Hyderabad	4	3	1	0	0	0	26	1.432
Madras	4	2	2	3	0	0	19	1.081
Kerala	4	0	3	1	0	0	6	0.538
Andhra	4	0	3	1	0	0	3	0.489

=== Central Zone ===
Team	Pld	W	L	D	T	NR	Pts	Q
Rajasthan	3	1	0	2	0	0	18	1.588
Madhya Pradesh	3	1	1	1	0	0	14	1.224
Vidarbha	3	1	1	1	0	0	11	0.784
Uttar Pradesh	3	0	1	2	0	0	8	0.681

=== North Zone ===
Team	Pld	W	L	D	T	NR	Pts	Q
Services	5	3	0	2	0	0	36	2.479
Delhi	5	3	0	2	0	0	35	1.629
Railways	5	3	1	1	0	0	30	1.851
Eastern Punjab	5	1	2	2	0	0	17	1.090
Southern Punjab	5	1	3	1	0	0	15	0.643
Jammu & Kashmir	5	0	5	0	0	0	0	0.110

=== West Zone ===
Team	Pld	W	L	D	T	NR	Pts	Q
Bombay	4	3	0	1	0	0	32	3.065
Baroda	4	2	0	2	0	0	27	1.211
Maharashtra	4	2	1	1	0	0	21	1.061
Gujarat	4	0	3	1	0	0	6	0.625
Saurashtra	4	1	3	0	0	0	3	0.463

=== East Zone ===
Team	Pld	W	L	D	T	NR	Pts	Q
Bihar	3	2	0	1	0	0	21	1.578
Bengal	3	2	1	0	0	0	18	2.046
Orissa	3	0	1	2	0	0	10	0.825
Assam	3	0	2	1	0	0	3	0.310

== Knockout stage ==
Quarter-finals
26 Feb 1960 – Delhi
Services	318 & 220/6
Rajasthan	289 & 317/6d

Semi-finals
3 Mar 1960 – Delhi
Services	146 & 346/6d
Bombay	416/9d & 32/1
26 Feb 1960 – Jamshedpur
Bihar	307 & 146
Mysore	314 & 316

Final
10 Mar 1960 – Bombay
Bombay	504
Mysore	221 & 261

=== Final ===
10–13 Mar 1960
Scorecard

Bombay (H)	v	Mysore
504 (141.3 overs); Manohar Hardikar 145; Deepak Das Gupta 4/77 (22.3 overs)		221 (93.4 overs); KS Viswanath 51; Ghulam Guard 5/66 (25.4 overs)
		261 (90.1 overs, follow-on); V. Subramanya 103; Ghulam Guard 4/69 (25 overs)

Bombay won by an innings and 22 runs
Brabourne Stadium, Bombay
Umpires: I. Gopalakrishnan and Sambhu Pan

- Bombay won the toss and elected to bat.

== Scorecards and averages ==
- CricketArchive
- ESPNcricinfo
