= 1967–68 Ranji Trophy =

Indian cricket tournament

- The Ranji Trophy
- Administrator(s): BCCI
- Cricket format: First-class
- Tournament format(s): League and knockout
- Champions: Bombay (19th title)
- Participants: 22
- Most runs: K. R. Rajagopal (Madras) (729)
- Most wickets: S. Venkataraghavan (Madras) (46)

The 1967–68 Ranji Trophy was the 34th season of the Ranji Trophy. Bombay won their tenth title in a row defeating Madras in the final.

== Highlights ==
- Madras won all their six matches going in to the final. Bombay won outright only one of their six matches in the tournament
- Gundappa Viswanath made his debut in first class cricket on 11 November scoring 230 for Mysore against Andhra.
- Vikram Thambuswamy took 8 wickets for 37 runs in an innings for Madras v Andhra. But it would be his only first class match
- In all their matches, Madhya Pradesh's middle order was constituted by Vijay Nayudu, Ashok Jagdale and Gulrez Ali who were respectively the grandson of C. K. Nayudu, and the sons of Madhavsinh Jagdale and Mushtaq Ali.

== Group stage ==
=== South Zone ===
Team	Pld	W	L	D	T	NR	Pts	Q
Madras	4	4	0	0	0	0	33	1.983
Hyderabad	4	2	1	1	0	0	23	1.760
Mysore	4	1	1	2	0	0	17	1.654
Andhra	4	1	2	1	0	0	11	0.565
Kerala	4	0	4	0	0	0	0	0.318

=== Central Zone ===
Team	Pld	W	L	D	T	NR	Pts	Q
Madhya Pradesh	2	2	0	0	0	0	16	1.223
Rajasthan	2	1	1	0	0	0	8	1.306
Vidarbha	2	0	2	0	0	0	0	0.597

=== East Zone ===
Team	Pld	W	L	D	T	NR	Pts	Q
Bengal	3	2	0	1	0	0	22	2.260
Bihar	3	2	0	1	0	0	21	1.993
Orissa	3	0	2	1	0	0	5	0.378
Assam	3	0	2	1	0	0	3	0.666

=== West Zone ===
Team	Pld	W	L	D	T	NR	Pts	Q
Bombay	4	1	0	3	0	0	26	1.953
Maharashtra	4	2	0	2	0	0	26	1.487
Gujarat	4	2	0	2	0	0	22	1.193
Saurashtra	4	1	3	0	0	0	8	0.714
Baroda	4	0	3	1	0	0	3	0.456

=== North Zone ===
Team	Pld	W	L	D	T	NR	Pts	Q
Services	4	2	0	2	0	0	25	1.534
Railways	4	2	0	2	0	0	24	1.318
Delhi	4	0	1	3	0	0	11	0.849
Southern Punjab	4	0	1	3	0	0	11	0.758
Northern Punjab	4	0	2	2	0	0	10	0.733

== Knockout stage ==
Quarter-finals
19 Jan 1968 – Madras
Madras	348 & 357/9d
Madhya Pradesh	259 & 167

Semi-finals
2 Feb 1968 – Calcutta
Bengal	186 & 287
Bombay	436/9d & 4/1
2 Feb 1968 – Madras
Madras	286 & 76/3
Services	213 & 145

Final
16 Feb 1968 – Bombay
Bombay	312 & 225/5
Madras	258 & 302

=== Final ===
16–20 February 1968
Scorecard

Madras	v	Bombay (H)
258 (89.3 overs); C. K. Bhaskaran 76*; Arun Varde 4/45		312 (141.1 overs); Ashok Mankad 112; C. K. Bhaskaran 4/68
302 (143.4 overs); K. R. Rajagopal 73; Padmakar Shivalkar 3/86		225/5 (119 overs); Manohar Hardikar 62*; V. V. Kumar 2/81

Bombay won on first innings lead
Brabourne Stadium, Bombay
Umpires: S. K. Bhattacharya and Sambhu Pan

- Bombay won the toss and decided to field

== Scorecards and averages ==
- CricketArchive
