= 1953–54 Ranji Trophy =

Indian cricket tournament

- The Ranji Trophy
- Administrator: BCCI
- Cricket format: First-class
- Tournament format: Knockout
- Champions: Bombay (7th title)
- Participants: 21
- Most runs: Madhav Mantri (Bombay) (522)
- Most wickets: Chandu Sarwate (Holkar) (23)

The 1953–54 Ranji Trophy was the 20th season of the Ranji Trophy. Bombay won the title defeating Holkar in the final.

== Zonal Matches ==
=== Central Zone ===
Round 1
25 Dec 1953 – Ajmer
Rajputana	199 & 173
Uttar Pradesh	182 & 123
28 Nov 1953 – Jabalpur
Madhya Pradesh	72 & 147
Holkar	464

Round 2
23 Jan 1954 – Ajmer
Rajputana	125 & 161
Holkar	486

=== West Zone ===
Round 1
28 Nov 1953 – Ahmedabad
Gujarat	225 & 360/8d
Saurashtra	207 & 192/9

Round 2
12 Dec 1953 – Bombay
Bombay	249 & 122/2
Baroda	117 & 251
9 Jan 1954 – Kolhapur
Maharashtra	576/6d
Gujarat	151 & 364/6

Round 3
23 Jan 1954 – Bombay
Bombay	385 & 62/0
Maharashtra	239 & 206

=== South Zone ===
Round 1
28 Nov 1953 – Bangalore
Mysore	290 & 49/2
Andhra	150 & 188

Round 2
25 Dec 1953 – Madras
Madras (T)	101/6
Mysore	243/8d
28 Nov 1953 – Trivandrum
Travancore-Cochin	241 & 171/4d
Hyderabad	125 & 104/4

Round 3
21 Jan 1954 – Madras
Madras	275 & 336/5d
Travancore-Cochin	147 & 148

(T) – Advanced to next round by spin of coin.

=== East Zone ===
Round 1
12 Dec 1953 – Cuttack
Orissa	118 & 142
Bengal	479 & 321/9d

Round 2
13 Feb 1954 – Jamshedpur
Bihar	169 & 267/7
Bengal	256 & 304

=== North Zone ===
Round 1
18 Dec 1953 – Delhi
Services	345 & 124/5d
Eastern Punjab	367 & 76/2
23 Dec 1953 – Patiala
Patiala	119/9d & 258
Delhi	125 & 253/4

Round 2
18 Jan 1954 – Jullundur
Eastern Punjab	163 & 82/6
Delhi	123 & 120/6d

== Inter-Zonal Knockout matches ==
Quarter-finals
12 Feb 1954 – Indore
Holkar	350/9d & 10/0
Eastern Punjab	127 & 229

Semi-finals
6 Mar 1954 – Indore
Holkar	575
Bengal	149 & 111
20 Feb 1954 – Bombay
Bombay	504 & 342/9d
Madras	318 & 149

Final
13 Mar 1954 – Indore
Holkar	292 & 193
Bombay	376 & 111/2

=== Final ===
13–17 March 1954
Scorecard

Holkar (H)	v	Bombay
292 (145.4 overs); Chandu Sarwate 82; Baloo Gupte 3/95		376 (143.1 overs); Rusi Modi 141; Chandu Sarwate 4/76
193 (89 overs); Madhavsinh Jagdale 53; Vinoo Mankad 4/61		111/2 (49 overs); Madhav Apte 53*; Arjun Naidu 1/39

Bombay won by 8 wickets
Yeshwant Club Ground, Indore
Umpires: Santosh Ganguli and Balkrishna Mohoni

- Holkar won the toss and decided to bat

== Scorecards and averages ==
- CricketArchive
