= 1955–56 Ranji Trophy =

Indian cricket tournament

- The Ranji Trophy
- Administrator: BCCI
- Cricket format: First-class
- Tournament format: Knockout
- Champions: Bombay (8th title)
- Participants: 22
- Most runs: Polly Umrigar (Bombay) (595)
- Most wickets: Premangsu Chatterjee (Bengal) (26)

The 1955–56 Ranji Trophy was the 22nd season of the Ranji Trophy. Bombay won the title defeating Bengal in the final.

== Zonal Matches ==
=== North Zone ===
Round 1
17 Jan 1956 – Delhi
Delhi	429 & 262/5d
Patiala	143 & 125
1 Dec 1955 – Delhi
Services	424
Eastern Punjab	158 & 174

Round 2
18 Feb 1956 – Delhi
Delhi (T)	412
Services	385/7

(T) – Advanced to next round by spin of coin.

=== South Zone ===
Round 1
31 Dec 1955 – Trivandrum
Travancore-Cochin	135 & 142
Andhra	462/9d

Round 2
10 Dec 1955 – Bangalore
Mysore	338 & 248/5d
Hyderabad	171 & 264/6
13 Jan 1956 – Madras
Madras	507/9d
Andhra	275 & 160/8

Round 3
4 Feb 1956 – Bangalore
Mysore	249 & 186/6d
Madras	281 & 145/7

=== West Zone ===
Round 1
11 Dec 1955 – Bombay
Bombay	307/6
Baroda	306

Round 2
14 Jan 1956 – Rajkot
Saurashtra	240 & 192/7d
Gujarat	266 & 123/2
4 Feb 1956 – Sholapur
Maharashtra	412
Bombay	481/5d

Round 3
18 Feb 1956 – Ahmedabad
Gujarat	232 & 100/6
Bombay	337

=== Central Zone ===
Round 1
16 Dec 1955 – Indore
Madhya Bharat	251
Madhya Pradesh	327 & 103/3
15 Jan 1956 – Udaipur
Rajputana	337 & 267/7d
Uttar Pradesh	388 & 103/0

Round 2
4 Feb 1956 – Nagpur
Madhya Pradesh	215 & 152
Uttar Pradesh	95 & 213

=== East Zone ===
Round 1
13 Jan 1956 – Jamshedpur
Bihar	60 & 135
Bengal	157 & 39/1
13 Jan 1956 – Gauhati
Assam	115 & 213/7
Orissa	333

Round 2
11 Feb 1956 – Calcutta
Bengal	373
Orissa	143 & 174

== Inter-Zonal Knockout matches ==
Quarter-finals
3 Mar 1956 – Delhi
Delhi	273
Bombay	274/4

Semi-finals
3 Mar 1956 – Calcutta
Bengal	289 & 23/0
Madhya Pradesh	155 & 155
11 Mar 1956 – Madras
Madras	124 & 89
Bombay	457

Final
30 Mar 1956 – Calcutta
Bengal	255 & 179
Bombay	307 & 129/2

=== Final ===
30 March – 2 April 1956
Scorecard

Bengal (H)	v	Bombay
255 (146.1 overs); Probir Sen 55, R. M. Chanda 55; Manohar Hardikar 8/39		308 (119.2 overs); Polly Umrigar 112; Premangsu Chatterjee 7/101
179 (85.5 overs); Basu Thakkar 68; Baloo Gupte 5/80		129/2 (42.3 overs); Yatin Rele 49*; K. K. Biswas 1/9

Bombay won by 8 wickets
Eden Gardens, Calcutta
Umpires: George Ayling and Dinkar Desai

- Toss not known

== Scorecards and averages ==
- CricketArchive
