= 1958–59 Ranji Trophy =

Indian cricket tournament

- The Ranji Trophy
- Administrator: BCCI
- Cricket format: First-class
- Tournament format: Knockout
- Champions: Bombay (10th title)
- Participants: 23
- Most runs: Pankaj Roy (Bengal) (605)
- Most wickets: Ramakant Desai (Bombay) (50)

The 1958–59 Ranji Trophy was the 25th season of the Ranji Trophy. Bombay won the title defeating Bengal in the final. This started a sequence of 15 consecutive Ranji titles for Bombay.

== Group stage ==
=== West Zone ===
Team	Pld	W	L	D	T	NR	Pts	Q
Bombay	4	2	0	2	0	0	29	2.325
Baroda	4	2	0	2	0	0	27	1.514
Maharashtra	4	0	0	4	0	0	15	1.057
Saurashtra	4	1	1	2	0	0	14	0.708
Gujarat	4	0	3	1	0	0	3	0.439

=== East Zone ===
Team	Pld	W	L	D	T	NR	Pts	Q
Bengal	3	3	0	0	0	0	26	3.600
Bihar	3	2	1	0	0	0	17	0.963
Assam (Note: The match between Assam and Orissa was not played. Assam were declared winners)	3	1	2	0	0	0	8	0.498
Orissa	3	0	3	0	0	0	0	0.272

=== North Zone ===
Team	Pld	W	L	D	T	NR	Pts	Q
Services	4	4	0	0	0	0	34	2.966
Railways	4	1	1	2	0	0	20	1.657
Delhi	4	2	1	1	0	0	20	1.222
Eastern Punjab	4	0	2	2	0	0	8	0.443
Patiala	4	0	3	1	0	0	3	0.375

=== South Zone ===
Team	Pld	W	L	D	T	NR	Pts	Q
Madras	4	2	0	2	0	0	30	1.733
Hyderabad	4	2	0	2	0	0	23	1.317
Mysore	4	1	0	3	0	0	22	1.332
Andhra	4	0	2	2	0	0	9	0.598
Kerala	4	0	3	1	0	0	3	0.543

=== Central Zone ===
Team	Pld	W	L	D	T	NR	Pts	Q
Rajasthan	3	2	0	1	0	0	19	1.996
Madhya Pradesh	3	1	0	2	0	0	14	1.126
Uttar Pradesh	3	1	1	1	0	0	13	0.993
Vidarbha	3	0	3	0	0	0	0	0.527

== Knockout stage ==
Quarter-finals
21 Feb 1959 – Madras
Madras	93 & 298
Bombay	389 & 4/0

Semi-finals
27 Feb 1959 – Bombay
Bombay	438 & 33/0
Services	211 & 259
14 Feb 1959 – Calcutta
Bengal	293 & 169/1
Rajasthan	198 & 263

Final
7 Mar 1959 – Bombay
Bombay	294 & 536/9d
Bengal	176 & 234

=== Final ===
7–11 Mar 1959
Scorecard

Bombay (H)	v	Bengal
294 (107.5 overs); H. D. Amroliwala 139; Premangsu Chatterjee 6/76		176 (72.4 overs); Pankaj Roy 51; Manohar Hardikar 4/24
536/9 decl (141 overs); Madhav Apte 157, Ramnath Kenny 111; Sujit Bose 3/125		234 (70.3 overs); Pankaj Roy 95; Ramakant Desai 4/37

Bombay won by 420 runs
Brabourne Stadium, Bombay
Umpires: Mohammad Yunus and Narayan Sane

- Bombay won the toss and elected to bat

== Scorecards and averages ==
- CricketArchive
- ESPNcricinfo
