= 1954–55 Ranji Trophy =

Indian cricket tournament

- The Ranji Trophy
- Administrator: BCCI
- Cricket format: First-class
- Tournament format: Knockout
- Champions: Madras (1st title)
- Participants: 20
- Most runs: A. G. Kripal Singh (Madras) (636)
- Most wickets: M. K. Murugesh (Madras) (23)

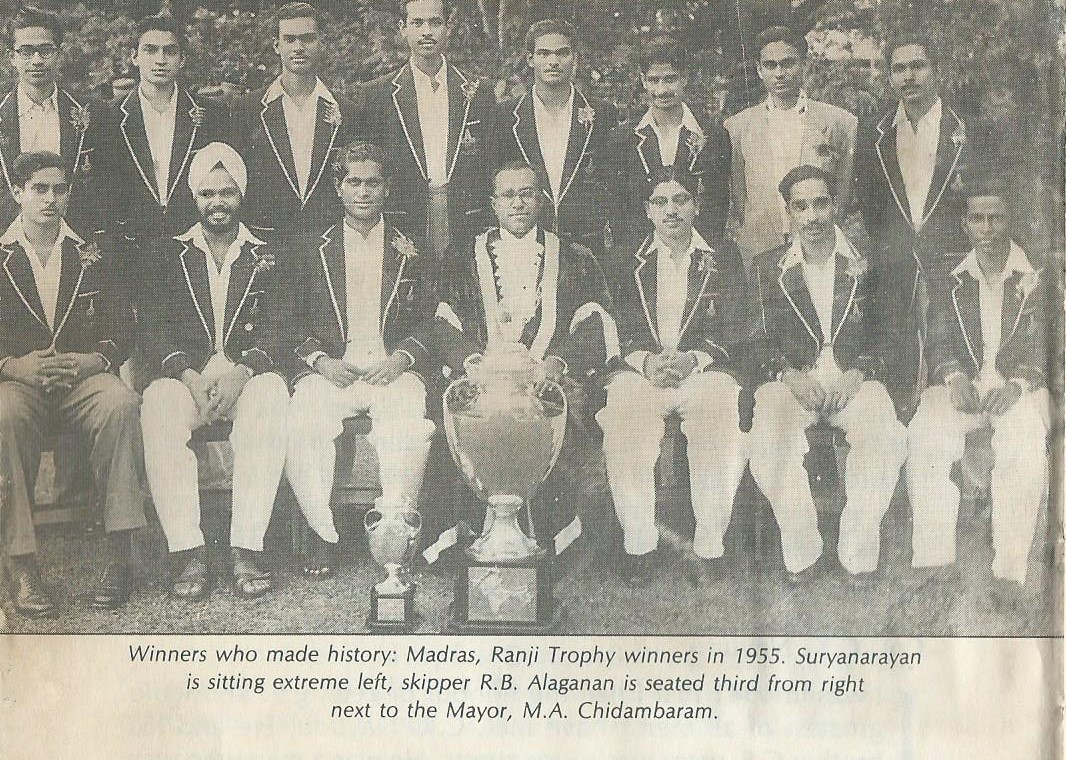
The First Tamil Nadu Ranji Trophy Triumph Team of 1954–1955.

The 1954–55 Ranji Trophy was the 21st season of the Ranji Trophy. Madras won the title defeating Holkar in the final.

== Zonal Matches ==
=== North Zone ===
Round 1
3 Dec 1954 – Delhi
Services	288 & 121/2
Delhi	163 & 242

Round 2
17 Dec 1954 – Jullundur
Eastern Punjab	148 & 282/7
Services	405

=== East Zone ===
Round 1
18 Dec 1954 – Cuttack
Orissa	58 & 126
Bengal	329/4d
11 Dec 1954 – Jorhat
Assam	53 & 89
Bihar	81 & 107

Round 2
16 Jan 1955 – Calcutta
Bengal	309 & 421/9d
Bihar	119 & 169/8

=== Central Zone ===
Round 1
18 Dec 1954 – Banaras
Uttar Pradesh	211 & 70/1
Madhya Pradesh	251 & 123/5d

Round 2
15 Jan 1955 – Indore
Holkar	441
Madhya Pradesh	161 & 100

=== West Zone ===
Round 1
18 Dec 1954 – Ahmedabad
Gujarat	354
Baroda	413/4

Round 2
22 Jan 1955 – Baroda
Baroda	284/3
Bombay	258
31 Jan 1955 – Rajkot
Saurashtra	160 & 245/5d
Maharashtra	382 & 37/0

Round 3
19 Feb 1955 – Baroda
Baroda	373
Maharashtra	260

=== South Zone ===
Round 1
2 Jan 1955 – Hyderabad
Hyderabad	480/6d
Andhra	128 & 245

Round 2
21 Jan 1955 – Hyderabad
Hyderabad	288 & 144/3d
Mysore	152 & 184/2
18 Dec 1954 – Ernakulam
Travancore-Cochin	247 & 141/6
Madras	414/9d

Round 3
4 Feb 1955 – Hyderabad
Hyderabad	274 & 131/5
Madras	331 & 172/6d

== Inter-Zonal Knockout matches ==
Quarter-finals
11 Feb 1955 – Delhi
Services	312
Bengal	364

Semi-finals
5 Mar 1955 – Indore
Holkar	492
Baroda	412
7 Mar 1955 – Madras
Madras	347 & 139
Bengal	174 & 155

Final
2 Apr 1955 – Indore
Holkar	417 & 326
Madras	478 & 311

=== Final ===
2–6 April 1955
Scorecard

Madras	v	Holkar (H)
478 (143.2 overs); C. D. Gopinath 133; Hiralal Gaekwad 4/137		417 (171.5 overs); Narayan Nivsarkar 85; M. K. Murugesh 3/97
311 (105.1 overs); A. G. Kripal Singh 91; V. P. Dixit 3/50		326 (80.2 overs); Chandu Sarwate 56; M. K. Murugesh 5/114

Madras won by 46 runs
Yeshwant Club Ground, Indore
Umpires: Dinkar Desai and Balkrishna Mohoni

- Holkar won the toss and decided to field.

== Scorecards and averages ==
- CricketArchive
