= 1949–50 Ranji Trophy =

Indian cricket tournament

- The Ranji Trophy
- Administrator: BCCI
- Cricket format: First-class
- Tournament format: Knockout
- Champions: Baroda (3rd title)
- Participants: 19
- Most runs: Vijay Hazare (Baroda) (609)
- Most wickets: Hiralal Gaekwad (Holkar) (29)

The 1949–50 Ranji Trophy was the 16th season of the Ranji Trophy. Baroda won the title defeating Holkar in the final.

== Highlights ==
- Vijay Hazare scored 130 and 101 in the final, following his 98 and 115 in the 1948–49 final.

== Zonal Matches ==
=== West Zone ===
Round 1
18 Nov 1949 – Baroda
Baroda	333
Bombay	114 & 201

Round 2
2 Dec 1949 – Baroda
Baroda	382
Kathiawar	180 & 145
3 Dec 1949 – Ahmedabad
Gujarat	360 & 70/4
Maharashtra	172 & 253

Round 3
8 Jan 1950 – Baroda
Baroda	357 & 348/4d
Gujarat	284 & 211/4

=== North Zone ===
Round 1
2 Dec 1949 – Delhi
Delhi	343 & 225
Rajputana	215 & 235
11 Dec 1949 – Patiala
Southern Punjab	152 & 121/4
Services	62 & 208

Round 2
9 Jan 1950 – Delhi
Delhi	544 & 140/4
Southern Punjab	456 & 34/3

=== East Zone ===
Round 1
6 Dec 1949 – Jorhat
Assam	50 & 52
Holkar	157
10 Dec 1949 – Jamshedpur
Bihar	163 & 326
Orissa	89 & 44

Round 2
27 Jan 1950 – Indore
Holkar	92 & 429
Bengal	141 & 251
4 Feb 1950 – Jamshedpur
Bihar	207 & 287
Uttar Pradesh	258 & 189

Round 3
26 Feb 1950 – Indore
Holkar	262 & 222/5
Bihar	226 & 254

=== South Zone ===
Round 1
24 Dec 1949 – Madras
Madras	328 & 236/7
Mysore	215 & 347
9 Dec 1949 – Secunderabad
Hyderabad	327 & 62/2
Central Provinces and Berar	136 & 251

Round 2
26 Jan 1950 – Madras
Madras	264 & 124
Hyderabad	125 & 136

== Inter-Zonal Knockout matches ==
Semi-finals
24 Feb 1950 – Madras
Madras	103 & 69
Baroda	297
4 Mar 1950 – Delhi
Delhi	335 & 253/7
Holkar	615 & 315

Final
17 Mar 1950 – Baroda
Baroda	437 & 258/6
Holkar	419 & 272

== Final ==
Baroda entered the final for the third successive season, following a win against Holkar in the 1947–48 season and a loss to Bombay in 1948–49 edition.

17–21 March 1950
Scorecard

Holkar	v	Baroda (H)
419 (154.5 overs); Mushtaq Ali 140; Vijay Hazare 3/99 (40 overs)		437 (165.4 overs); Vijay Hazare 130; C. S. Nayudu 5/182 (56 overs)
272 (107.4 overs); Chandu Sarwate 66; Amir Elahi 4/66 (20.4 overs)		258/6 (99 overs); Vijay Hazare 101; C. S. Nayudu 4/90 (30 overs)

Baroda won by 4 wickets
Maharaja Pratapsingh Coronation Gymkhana Ground, Baroda
Umpires: D. B. Deodhar and Jamshed Patel

- Holkar won the toss and elected to bat.
- Hiralal Gaekwad (Holkar) claimed his 50th wicket in first-class cricket.
