= Ramnath Kenny =

Indian cricketer (1930–1985)

Personal information
- Full name: Ramnath Baburao Kenny
- Born: 29 September 1930; Bombay, British India
- Died: 21 November 1985 (aged 55); Bombay, India
- Batting: Right-handed
- Bowling: Right-arm offbreak

International information
- National side: India
- Test debut (cap 87): 31 December 1958 v West Indies
- Last Test: 23 January 1960 v Australia

Domestic team information
- Years: Team
- 1950-51 to 1960-61: Bombay
- 1961-62: Bengal

Career statistics
| Competition | Tests | First-class |
|---|---|---|
| Matches | 5 | 59 |
| Runs scored | 245 | 3079 |
| Batting average | 27.22 | 50.47 |
| 100s/50s | 0/3 | 11/11 |
| Top score | 62 | 218 |
| Balls bowled | - | 1041 |
| Wickets | - | 15 |
| Bowling average | - | 31.19 |
| 5 wickets in innings | - | 0 |
| 10 wickets in match | - | 0 |
| Best bowling | - | 4/8 |
| Catches/stumpings | 1/- | 26/- |
- Source: Cricinfo

Ramnath Baburao Kenny (29 September 1930 – 21 November 1985) was an Indian cricketer who played in five Test matches between 1958 and 1960. He was an elegant right handed middle order batsman, "a front foot player with a sound defense" and an occasional off-break bowler.

== Personal life ==
Son of a mill manager in David Sassoon & Co., Kenny studied at King George High School, R.N. Ruia College and Sidharth College, and graduated with a Bachelor of Arts degree. In 1961, he did a business management course in England. Later in his life, he worked for the State Bank of India in Bombay and for Mahindra & Mahindra.

== Cricket career ==
Kenny played a few seasons of cricket for the Bombay University before making his first class debut for Bombay against the Commonwealth XI in 1950. A month later, he played his first match in Ranji Trophy scoring 52 against Maharashtra and adding 147 with Dattu Phadkar who made a career highest 217* at the other end. During this he scored an all-run six without the aid of overthrows. Kenny hit the ball to extra cover where it stopped just short of the boundary. Before the fielder, the Raja of Jath, could retrieve the ball, Kenny and Phadkar ran six.

While not yet a regular in the Bombay team, he did well for the Universities against touring teams, scoring 86* against England in 1951-52 and 99 against Pakistan in 1952-53. After a 143 for Bombay against the next Commonwealth XI in 1953-54, where he reached his hundred in only 148 minutes, he was selected for two Unofficial Test matches. He scored 65, 33 & 11* in them. Indian Cricket annual selected him as one of the "Cricketers of year" for 1953–54.

=== 1956–57 ===
After several moderate seasons, Kenny flowered in 1956–57 Ranji Trophy. In the West Zone final against Maharashtra, Bombay reached 469 for 4 at the end of the second day, a lead of 298. The Bombay captain Madhav Mantri used the heavy roller on the pitch on the third day to break up the wicket. On this pitch with life and unpredictable bounce, Kenny scored 139. Five batsmen scored over 50 but writing for the Indian Cricket Field Annual, Dicky Rutnagur considered Kenny's innings technically the most perfect innings of the match.

Bombay faced Uttar Pradesh in the quarter final. On jute matting, C. S. Nayudu reduced Bombay to 111 for 5. Kenny played another brilliant innings, outshining the Indian captain Polly Umrigar in a match winning partnership of 131 and mastering the bowling of Nayudu. Placing the ball "wherever he liked", he scored 132 in 191 minutes with 16 fours.

In the semifinal at the Bombay Gymkhana, Kenny scored a career best 218 against Madras. On another wicket that helped spinners, Bombay lost early wickets. Kenny added 289 runs with Rusi Modi and 152 with Hoshang Amroliwala. He confidently went down the wicket to the spinners and "tore the bowling to shreds. From fine leg glances to extra cover drives, the strokes flowed from his bat". This was third hundred in consecutive innings.

He scored only 2 runs in the final against Services, his only failure in the season. Bowling with the second new ball, Surendranath had Kenny edging to the slips where the catch was dropped by the future Air Marshall Gyanendranath Kunzru. But in Surendranath's next over, he mistimed a hook to short fine leg. Kenny topped the 1956-57 Ranji aggregates with 529 runs. He already had a reputation for batting well on the difficult wickets in the Kanga League.

=== Test career ===
Bombay was eliminated early in the Ranji Trophy in 1957–58 but in the season after, Kenny scored 142 against Maharashtra. Scored in 4 hours with a five and 19 fours, it came in a team score of 320 where no other batsman made more than 35. He was selected for the third Test against West Indies that started the following week. India lost two quick wickets when they started their innings late on the second day. Captain Ghulam Ahmed sent in Kenny and Ghorpade early to protect the senior batsmen Vijay Manjrekar and Polly Umrigar from the bowlers Wes Hall, Roy Gilchrist and Sonny Ramadhin. Both batsmen survived the day but Kenny fell to Hall for 16 & 0 on the third, his off-stump uprooted by an outswinger in the second innings. India lost by an innings and 336 runs and Kenny was one of the several players dropped from the team.

Kenny did not play in the other Tests of the series and was not picked for the tour to England in 1959. But at a time when India was selecting and rejecting players and captains at a rapid rate, the next chance came around when Australia visited India a few months later. Kenny had scored another hundred in March 1959 in the Ranji final against Bengal. He was now the vice captain in the Bombay side under Madhav Apte. Both Apte and Kenny scored ducks in the first innings and hundreds in the second. The two added 243 runs for the third wicket.

In the second Test at Kanpur against Australia, Kenny played the most important innings of his Indian career. On a newly laid wicket that assisted spin, Australia took a first innings lead of 67 runs despite Jasu Patel taking nine wickets. Coming in at No.7 in the second innings with the score on 153, Kenny added 61 runs with Chandu Borde and 72 with Bapu Nadkarni. After India scored 291, Patel and Polly Umrigar bowled Australia out for 105 for a famous win. Kenny's 51 in the second innings came after a zero in the first.

He scored two more fifties in the series. At the Brabourne Stadium, his 55* on the last day and a partnership of 109 with Abbas Ali Baig helped save the match. He was the batsman at the other end when Baig was famously kissed by a woman spectator who ran on to the field. Kenny scored 62 in Eden Gardens in what would be his last Test innings.

=== Later career ===
Kenny played only one more season for Bombay. After a series of failures, he was dropped from the side. "When he was dropped by Bombay selectors on the morning of the match", says Vasoo Paranjpe, "the selectors felt so guilty that nobody was willing to be the one to inform him. He was treated shabbily. Players of lesser quality played for India but Ram got only 5 Tests. That was unfair." He played for Bengal for a year. His 11th and last first class hundred was against Assam in December 1961. After a couple of informal matches in 1963, Kenny disappeared from first class cricket but continued to play in the Bombay local cricket for many years. He scored 310 for Mahindra against Jupiter General Insurance in the Times Shield in 1965

== Later life ==
Kenny played and coached for Penrith Cricket Club in the Cumberland Cricket League. He took a hat-trick for them against the Haverigg Club in 1961. After qualifying as a coach, he assisted Duleepsinhji in the BCCI camp for coaches in Bombay. The BCCI gave him a benefit match in 1977–78.

He died in 1985 in his office after a heart attack.
