= 1935–36 Ranji Trophy =

Indian cricket tournament

- The Ranji Trophy
- Dates: 30 November 1935 – 31 March 1936
- Administrator: BCCI
- Cricket format: First-class
- Tournament format: Knockout
- Champions: Bombay (2nd title)
- Participants: 16
- Matches: 16
- Most runs: S. M. Kadri (Bombay) (515)
- Most wickets: A. G. Ram Singh (Madras) (28)
- Official website: https://www.bcci.tv

The 1935–36 Ranji Trophy was the second edition of India's first-class cricket championship. Having been called 'The Cricket Championship of India' in 1934–35, the tournament was rebranded in 1935 in honour of the late Kumar Sri Ranjitsinhji, known as Ranji.

Matches were played from 4 November 1934 to 12 March 1935 and a total of 16 state and city teams participated. Of the original 15, the Army team withdrew but there were two new members with Bengal and Rajputana (now Rajasthan) making their debuts. Although the sides were divided into four zonal groups, the tournament utilised a knockout format. Bombay defeated Madras by 190 runs in the final.

== Teams ==
Although the tournament ran in a knockout format, the Board of Control for Cricket in India (BCCI) organised the teams by zone. Bengal and Rajputana made their debuts but the Army team did not participate. The sixteen teams are listed alphabetically by zone and the sides that won each zonal title are in bold.

- **East Zone**
- **Bengal**
- Central India (now Madhya Pradesh)
- Central Provinces and Berar (now Vidarbha)
- Rajputana (now Rajasthan)
- **North Zone**
- Delhi
- **Northern India**
- Southern Punjab (now Punjab)
- United Provinces (now Uttar Pradesh)
- **South Zone**
- Hyderabad
- **Madras** (now Tamil Nadu)
- Mysore (now Karnataka)
- **West Zone**
- **Bombay** (now Mumbai)
- Gujarat
- Maharashtra
- Sind
- Western India

== Highlights ==
- Although the Army team withdrew, the number of participants increased to 16 as Bengal and Rajputana made their tournament debuts.
- S. M. Kadri scored hundreds in both innings for Bombay against Western India.

== Zonal Matches ==
=== East Zone ===
Round 1
19 Dec 1935 – Calcutta
**Bengal**	**162 & 356/6d**
Central Provinces and Berar	105 & 171
10 Jan 1936 – Indore
**Central India**	**196 & 218/5**
Rajputana	149 & 264/7d

Round 2
18 Jan 1936 – Calcutta
**Bengal**	**283 & 259**
Central India	200 & 195/5

=== North Zone ===
Round 1
12 Feb 1936 – Delhi
**United Provinces**	**230 & 195/6**
Southern Punjab	169 & 280/5d
15 Feb 1936 – Delhi
Delhi	124 & 44/2
**Northern India**	**206 & 255**

Round 2
19 Feb 1936 – Delhi
United Provinces	208 & 213
**Northern India**	**452**

=== South Zone ===
Round 1
30 Nov 1935 – Bangalore
Mysore	162 & 135
**Madras**	**275 & 131**

Round 2
28 Dec 1935 – Chennai
**Madras**	**263 & 123/4**
Hyderabad	268 & 109

=== West Zone ===
Round 1
10 Dec 1935 – Poona
Maharashtra	228
**Bombay**	**308 & 295**

Round 2
13 Dec 1935 – Poona
**Western India**	**348 & 154**
Gujarat	144 & 104
16 Dec 1935 – Poona
**Bombay**	**369 & 105/2**
Sind	230 & 329/7d

Round 3
20 Dec 1935 – Poona
Western India	181
**Bombay**	**243 & 484**

== Inter-Zonal Knockout Stage ==
Semi-finals
14 Feb 1936 – Madras
**Madras**	**195 & 158**
Bengal	144 & 118
20 Mar 1936 – Delhi
**Bombay**	**170 & 223**
Northern India	140 & 241

Final
27 Mar 1936 – Delhi
Madras	268 & 125
**Bombay**	**384 & 199**

== Final ==
27–31 Mar 1936
Scorecard

**Bombay**	**v**	**Madras**
**384 (144.1 overs)**; Ahmed Baporia 90; M. A. Uttappa 4/70		**268 (108 overs)**; A. V. Krishnaswamy 77; Bomanji Kalapesi 5/92
**199 (86 overs)**; Vijay Merchant 79; A. G. Ram Singh 5/92		**125 (52 overs)**; C. Ramaswami 40; Rustomji Jamshedji 3/18

**Bombay won by 190 runs**
Feroz Shah Kotla, Delhi

- Bombay won the toss and elected to field
- The match was played in a neutral ground.
