= 1945–46 Ranji Trophy =

Indian cricket tournament

- The Ranji Trophy
- Administrator: BCCI
- Cricket format: First-class
- Tournament format: Knockout
- Champions: Holkar (1st title)
- Participants: 21
- Most runs: Hemu Adhikari (Baroda) (555)
- Most wickets: Amir Elahi (Baroda) (30)

The 1945–46 Ranji Trophy was the 12th season of the Ranji Trophy. Holkar won the title defeating Baroda in the final.

== Highlights ==
- Holkar scored 912 for 8 decl against Mysore in the semifinal. This was the highest score in Indian first class cricket until Hyderabad made 944 for 6 against Andhra in 1993–94.

- Six batsmen scored hundreds for Holkar: Kamal Bhandarkar 142, Chandu Sarwate 101, Madhavsinh Jagdale 164, C. K. Nayudu 101, Bhausaheb Nimbalkar 172 and Rameshwar Pratap Singh 100. This has never been equalled.
- There were seven century partnerships in the Holkar innings. All wickets from one to eight, except the second, made more than 100 runs.
- B. K. Garudachar took 4 wickets for 301. This is the most expensive bowling in Indian cricket, and third most expensive in all first-class cricket.
- Chandu Sarwate took 9 for 61 in the Mysore first innings in addition to his hundred. It is the only instance of a century and nine wickets in an innings in Indian cricket.
- Mysore conceded defeat on the fourth day.

- Baroda won the Zonal finals and the Semifinals by the spin of a coin, as both matches were unable to produce a winner. The Zonal finals were drawn with the first innings incomplete, while their semifinal ended in a tie.
- Vijay Merchant averaged 405.00 with the bat (405 in two innings, once out). This is the highest batting average achieved for any Ranji season.
- C. K. Nayudu scored 200 for Holkar v Baroda in the final at the age of 50 years and 142 days. He is the oldest Indian cricketer to score a double hundred and the fifth oldest in all first class cricket after Dave Nourse, John King, Archie MacLaren and Jack Hobbs.

== Zonal Matches ==
=== South Zone ===
Round 1
14 Dec 1945 – Bangalore
Mysore	158 & 292
Madras	172 & 166
21 Dec 1945 – Nagpur
Central Provinces and Berar	154 & 127
Hyderabad	399

Round 2
26 Jan 1946 – Bangalore
Mysore	188 & 309
Hyderabad	176 & 220

=== West Zone ===
Round 1
29 Dec 1945 – Karachi
Sind	416 & 61/1
Maharashtra	258 & 250/9d
19 Dec 1945 – Jamnagar
Baroda	328 & 363/5d
Nawanagar	218 & 138/8
14 Dec 1945 – Rajkot
Western India	199 & 158
Gujarat	164 & 190

Round 2
25 Jan 1946 – Bombay
Bombay	560/5d
Sind	234 & 306
2 Feb 1946 – Baroda
Baroda	243 & 277
Western India	215 & 104/8

Round 3
9 Feb 1946 – Bombay
Bombay	645
Baroda (T)	465/6

(T) – Advanced to next round by spin of coin.

=== East Zone ===
Round 1
20 Dec 1945 – Kanpur
United Provinces	99 & 221
Bengal	126 & 239
15 Dec 1945 – Indore
Holkar	433
Bihar	142 & 104

Round 2
19 Jan 1946 – Calcutta
Bengal	119 & 266
Holkar	288 & 102/5

=== North Zone ===
Round 1
28 Dec 1945 – Delhi
Delhi	91 & 203/7
North West Frontier Province	141 & 150

Round 2
10 Jan 1946 – Patiala
Southern Punjab	472
Delhi	181 & 98
2 Feb 1946 – Rajputana
Rajputana	220 & 114
Northern India	212 & 125/1

Round 3
7 Feb 1946 – Patiala
Southern Punjab	658/8d
Northern India	250

== Inter-Zonal Knockout matches ==
Semi-finals
2 Mar 1946 – Indore
Holkar	912/8d
Mysore	190 & 509/6
4 Mar 1946 – Patiala
Southern Punjab	167 & 146
Baroda (T)	106 & 207

Final
22 Mar 1946 – Indore
Holkar	342 & 273
Baroda	198 & 361

(T) – Advanced to finals by spin of coin.

== Final ==
22–27 March 1946
Scorecard

Holkar (H)	v	Baroda
342 (149.3 overs); C. K. Nayudu 200; Ahmed Patel 3/52		148 (77 overs); Vijay Hazare 87*; C. S. Nayudu 5/66
273 (118.5 overs); Hiralal Gaekwad 79*; Vivek Hazare 4/49		361 (136.5 overs); M. M. Naidu 91; C. S. Nayudu 5/148

Holkar won by 106 runs
Yeshwant Club Ground, Indore
Umpires: Jamshed Patel and T. A. Ramachandran

- Holkar won the toss and decided to bat

== Scorecards and averages ==
- CricketArchive
