= 1946–47 Ranji Trophy =

Indian cricket tournament

- The Ranji Trophy
- Administrator: BCCI
- Cricket format: First-class
- Tournament format: Knockout
- Champions: Baroda (2nd title)
- Participants: 19
- Most runs: Gul Mohammad (Baroda) (596)
- Most wickets: Vijay Hazare (Baroda) (38)

The 1946–47 Ranji Trophy was the 13th season of the Ranji Trophy. Baroda won the title defeating Holkar in the final.

== Highlights ==
- Vijay Hazare and Gul Mohammad added 577 runs for the fourth wicket in the final between Baroda and Holkar. This was a world record for any wicket in first class for nearly sixty years. It is still a record for the fourth wicket.

== Zonal Matches ==
=== West Zone ===
Round 1
22 Dec 1946 – Baroda
Baroda	316 & 110/6
Maharashtra	171 & 252
10 Jan 1947 – Rajkot
Kathiawar	155 & 103
Gujarat	290
30 Nov 1946 – Bombay
Bombay	336
Nawanagar	69 & 240

Round 2
18 Jan 1947 – Baroda
Baroda	270 & 323
Gujarat	192 & 187/7
22 Dec 1946 – Karachi
Sind	224 & 350/9d
Bombay	368 & 209/5

Round 3
25 Jan 1947 – Baroda
Baroda	347 & 249
Bombay	269 & 119/1

=== South Zone ===
Round 1
20 Dec 1946 – Secunderabad
Hyderabad	363 & 10/2
Central Provinces and Berar	109 & 262
28 Dec 1946 – Madras
Madras	209 & 77/4
Mysore	439

Round 2
19 Jan 1947 – Secunderabad
Hyderabad	296 & 486/8d
Mysore	145 & 220

=== East Zone ===
Round 1
21 Dec 1946 – Jamshedpur
Bihar	149 & 242
Holkar	397/8d
18 Jan 1947 – Calcutta
Bengal	295 & 158
United Provinces	95 & 213

Round 2
30 Jan 1947 – Indore
Holkar	350
Bengal	165 & 103

=== North Zone ===
Round 1
25 Jan 1947 – Patiala
Southern Punjab	330 & 88/1
Delhi	257 & 160

Round 2
30 Jan 1947 – Patiala
Southern Punjab	285 & 246
Northern India	462 & 264

== Inter-Zonal Knockout matches ==
Semi-finals
8 Feb 1947 – Baroda
Baroda	337 & 46/1
Hyderabad	118 & 263
Holkar	Walkover
Northern India

Final
7 Mar 1947 – Baroda
Baroda	784
Holkar	202 & 173

== Final ==
7–11 March 1947
Scorecard

Holkar	v	Baroda (H)
202 (83.2 overs); Chandu Sarwate 94; Vijay Hazare 6/85		784 (291 overs); Gul Mahomed 319, Vijay Hazare 288; C. K. Nayudu 4/178
173 (67 overs); B. B. Nimbalkar 87; Amir Elahi 6/62

Baroda won by an innings and 409 runs
Central College Ground, Baroda
Umpires: M. G. Bhave and Jamshed Patel

- Holkar won the toss and decided to bat
- Timeless match, ended on the fifth day

== Scorecards and averages ==
- CricketArchive
