= 1985–86 Ranji Trophy =

1985-86 Ranji Trophy
- The Ranji Trophy, which the winners get.
- Administrator: BCCI
- Cricket format: First-class cricket
- Tournament format(s): League and knockout
- Champions: Delhi (4th title)
- Participants: 27
- Most runs: Kirti Azad (Delhi) (834)
- Most wickets: Sarkar Talwar (Haryana) (45)

The 1985–86 Ranji Trophy was the 52nd season of the Ranji Trophy. Delhi defeated Haryana by an innings and 141 runs in the final.

== Expansion ==
Three teams participated for the first time: Goa in the South Zone, Himachal Pradesh in the North Zone and Tripura in the East Zone. This raised the number of teams from 24 to 27.

== Highlights ==
- Playing for Rajasthan against Vidarbha, Pradeep Sunderam took all 10 wickets for 78 runs, and 16 wickets for 154 runs. This was the second (and till 2021, the last) instance of a bowler taking 10 wickets in an innings in Ranji trophy.

== Group stage ==
=== North Zone ===
Team	Pld	W	L	D	T	NR	Pts	Q
Delhi	5	3	0	2	0	0	100	4.035
Haryana	5	3	1	1	0	0	98	1.595
Punjab	5	2	1	2	0	0	75	1.473
Jammu and Kashmir	5	1	2	2	0	0	51	0.649
Services	5	1	1	3	0	0	50	0.736
Himachal Pradesh	5	0	5	0	0	0	17	0.254

=== Central Zone ===
Team	Pld	W	L	D	T	NR	Pts	Q
Uttar Pradesh	4	2	0	2	0	0	70	2.367
Rajasthan	4	2	2	0	0	0	67	0.861
Madhya Pradesh	4	1	0	3	0	0	45	0.879
Vidarbha	4	0	1	3	0	0	32	0.941
Railways	4	0	2	2	0	0	26	0.733

=== West Zone ===
Team	Pld	W	L	D	T	NR	Pts	Q
Maharashtra	4	2	0	2	0	0	69	1.727
Bombay	4	1	0	3	0	0	56	2.000
Saurashtra	4	0	1	3	0	0	34	0.830
Gujarat	4	0	2	2	0	0	32	0.576
Baroda	4	0	0	4	0	0	25	0.714

=== South Zone ===
Team	Pld	W	L	D	T	NR	Pts	Q
Andhra	5	2	0	3	0	0	86	1.448
Tamil Nadu	5	2	0	3	0	0	82	1.558
Hyderabad	5	2	0	3	0	0	81	1.834
Karnataka	5	1	0	4	0	0	61	1.146
Kerala	5	1	3	1	0	0	52	0.684
Goa	5	0	5	0	0	0	28	0.429

=== East Zone ===
Team	Pld	W	L	D	T	NR	Pts	Q
Bihar	4	3	0	1	0	0	101	2.377
Bengal	4	2	0	2	0	0	73	1.570
Orissa	4	2	1	1	0	0	72	1.558
Assam	4	1	3	0	0	0	44	0.558
Tripura	4	0	4	0	0	0	14	0.321

== Knockout stage ==
Pre-Quarter-finals
7 Feb 1986 — Pune
Maharashtra	585 & 278/4
Bengal	373
7 Feb 1986 — Kanpur
Uttar Pradesh	149/1
Tamil Nadu (T)	508

Quarter-finals
14 Feb 1986 — Jaipur
Rajasthan	431
Andhra	185 & 227/4
14 Feb 1986 — Pune
Maharashtra	352 & 64/3
Delhi	604 & 160/4d
14 Feb 1986 — Madras
Tamil Nadu	233 & 212/5
Bombay	380
14 Feb 1986 — Jamshedpur
Bihar	268
Haryana	270 & 385

Semi-finals
15 Mar 1986 — Kota
Rajasthan	169 & 177
Delhi	192 & 358
15 Mar 1986 — Bombay
Bombay	296 & 229
Haryana	423 & 252

Finals
28 Mar 1986 — Delhi
Delhi	638
Haryana	288 & 209

(T) - Advanced to next round by spin of coin.

=== Final ===
29 March - 1 April 1986
Scorecard

Haryana	v	Delhi (H)
288 (109.5 overs); Ashwini Kumar 74; Maninder Singh 3/66		638 (186.2 overs); Manoj Prabhakar 113, Kirti Azad 107, Mohinder Amarnath 194, Ajay Sharma 110; Sarkar Talwar 4/194
209 (79.1 overs); Ashok Malhotra 98; Maninder Singh 8/54

Delhi won by an innings and 141 runs
Feroz Shah Kotla, Delhi
Umpires: Subrata Banerjee, V. K. Ramaswamy

- Haryana won the toss and decided to bat

== Scorecards and averages ==
- CricketArchive
