= 1970–71 Ranji Trophy =

1970-71 Ranji Trophy
- The Ranji Trophy, which the winners get.
- Administrator: BCCI
- Cricket format: First-class cricket
- Tournament format(s): League and knockout
- Champions: Bombay (22nd title)
- Participants: 24
- Most runs: Hemant Kanitkar (Maharashtra) (687)
- Most wickets: B. S. Chandrasekhar (Mysore) (46)

The 1970–71 Ranji Trophy was the 37th season of the Ranji Trophy. Bombay won their 13th title in a row defeating Maharashtra in the final.

A proposal to promote two teams from the zonal leagues to the knockout stage was made Maharashtra in the working committee meeting of BCCI at Shillong on 16 August 1970. Bombay had won Ranji Trophy in the previous twelve seasons and Maharashtra repeatedly found their qualification from the West Zone blocked. Ironically, Maharashtra won the West Zone in the 1970–71 and Bombay finished second in the zone for the first time since 1958–59. But the new rules enabled Bombay to qualify for the knockout matches as the second team and they eventually beat Maharashtra in the final.

== Highlights ==
- From this season, two teams qualified from each zone to the knockout rounds.
- For the first time in 13 seasons, Bombay finished second in the West Zone, but thanks to new rule, qualified to the quarterfinals behind Maharashtra. They then won their 13th title in a row beating Maharashtra in the final.

== Group stage ==
=== South Zone ===
Team	Pld	W	L	D	T	NR	Pts	Q
Hyderabad	4	4	0	0	0	0	34	2.938
Mysore	4	3	1	0	0	0	25	1.355
Madras	4	1	2	1	0	0	14	1.029
Andhra	4	0	2	2	0	0	8	0.721
Kerala	4	0	3	1	0	0	3	0.293

=== North Zone ===
Team	Pld	W	L	D	T	NR	Pts	Q
Delhi	5	3	0	2	0	0	35	1.451
Punjab	5	2	0	3	0	0	28	1.352
Railways	5	2	1	2	0	0	26	1.523
Services	5	2	1	2	0	0	25	1.116
Haryana	5	1	3	1	0	0	11	0.565
Jammu & Kashmir	5	0	5	0	0	0	0	0.562

=== Central Zone ===
Team	Pld	W	L	D	T	NR	Pts	Q
Rajasthan	3	3	0	0	0	0	24	2.582
Vidarbha	3	2	1	0	0	0	16	1.178
Madhya Pradesh	3	0	2	1	0	0	5	0.718
Uttar Pradesh	3	0	2	1	0	0	3	0.487

=== West Zone ===
Team	Pld	W	L	D	T	NR	Pts	Q
Maharashtra	4	2	0	2	0	0	27	1.376
Bombay	4	2	0	2	0	0	26	1.645
Baroda	4	0	1	3	0	0	12	0.407
Gujarat	4	0	1	3	0	0	10	1.243
Saurashtra	4	0	2	2	0	0	8	0.854

=== East Zone ===
Team	Pld	W	L	D	T	NR	Pts	Q
Bihar	3	2	0	1	0	0	23	2.387
Bengal	3	2	0	1	0	0	19	1.726
Assam	3	1	2	0	0	0	8	0.648
Orissa	3	0	3	0	0	0	0	0.380

== Knockout stage ==
Pre-Quarter-finals
13 Feb 1971 – Delhi
Delhi	366 & 235
Hyderabad	210 & 269
18 Feb 1971 – Jamshedpur
Bihar	406/9d & 165/3d
Punjab	404 & 54/1

Quarter-finals
26 Feb 1971 – Calcutta
Bengal	330 & 255/7d
Vidarbha	187 & 157/4
28 Feb 1971 – Bombay
Bombay	301 & 82/0
Delhi	185 & 197
28 Feb 1971 – Poona
Maharashtra	624/5d
Rajasthan	604
28 Feb 1971 – Bangalore
Mysore	195 & 210/8
Bihar	196 & 205

Semi-finals
19 Mar 1971 – Calcutta
Bengal	158 & 275/9
Bombay	459
19 Mar 1971 – Poona
Maharashtra	210 & 315/8
Mysore	239 & 246

Finals
2 Apr 1971 – Bombay
Bombay	287 & 196
Maharashtra	230 & 205

=== Semi-finals ===
19–22 March 1971
1st Semi-final
Scorecard

Bombay	v	Bengal (H)
459 (184 overs); Mahesh Sampat 141; Dilip Doshi 3/72 (45 overs)		158 (98.3 overs); Prakash Poddar 47; Padmakar Shivalkar 5/36 (29 overs)
		275/9 (111 overs); SS Mitra 130*; Padmakar Shivalkar 5/69 (38 overs)

Match drawn
Calcutta

19–22 March 1971
2nd Semi-final
Scorecard

Maharashtra (H)	v	Mysore
210 (69.1 overs); Nicholas Saldanha 45; BS Chandrasekhar 4/66 (26 overs)		239 (98 overs); B Raghunath 87; VN Joshi 3/56 (31 overs)
315/8d (81.4 overs); Chetan Chauhan 147; BS Chandrasekhar 5/110 (30 overs)		246 (110.5 overs); Brijesh Patel 77; VN Joshi 7/80 (46.5 overs)

Maharashtra won by 40 runs
Pune

=== Final ===
2–7 April 1971
Final
Scorecard

Bombay (H)	v	Maharashtra
287 (110 overs); Ramnath Parkar 108; Nicholas Saldanha 6/66 (26 overs)		230 (92.3 overs); Nicholas Saldanha 50; Abdul Ismail 4/41 (19 overs)
196 (107.3 overs); Mahesh Sampat 60; Vithal Joshi 5/62 (27.1 overs)		205 (83.4 overs); Chandu Borde 51; Padmakar Shivalkar 6/56 (29.4 overs)

Bombay won by 48 runs
Brabourne Stadium, Bombay
Umpires: M. V. Nagendra and B. Satyaji Rao

- Bombay won the toss and elected to bat.

== Scorecards and average ==
- CricketArchive
