= William Ghosh =

Indian cricketer (1928–1993)

Personal information
- Born: 9 November 1928; Jullundur, British India
- Died: 26 June 1993 (aged 64); Delhi, India
- Batting: Right-handed
- Bowling: Slow left-arm orthodox, left-arm medium pace

Domestic team information
- Years: Team
- 1949-50: Southern Punjab
- 1950-51 to 1957-58: Eastern Punjab
- 1952-53 to 1962-63: North Zone
- 1958-59 to 1968-69: Railways
- 1959-60 to 1965-66: Indian Starlets

Career statistics
| Competition | First-class |
|---|---|
| Matches | 71 |
| Runs scored | 1160 |
| Batting average | 18.12 |
| 100s/50s | 0/1 |
| Top score | 52 not out |
| Balls bowled | 12,845 |
| Wickets | 239 |
| Bowling average | 19.77 |
| 5 wickets in innings | 17 |
| 10 wickets in match | 1 |
| Best bowling | 6/35 |
| Catches/stumpings | 20/– |
- Source: Cricinfo, 10 December 2018

William Ghosh (9 November 1928 – 26 June 1993) was an Indian cricketer who played first-class cricket from 1949 to 1968.

Ghosh was a left-arm spin bowler who took 239 first-class wickets at 19.77, playing for various teams in the north of India. He twice appeared in Test trials, but did not play Test cricket. His best innings bowling figures were 6 for 35 in 1953-54. He took his best match figures of 10 for 65 (5 for 33 and 5 for 32) when he captained Railways to victory over Southern Punjab in 1966-67.
