= 1934–35 Ranji Trophy =

Indian cricket tournament (inaugural edition)

- The Ranji Trophy
- Dates: 4 November 1934 – 12 March 1935
- Administrator(s): BCCI
- Cricket format: First-class
- Tournament format(s): Knockout
- Champions: Bombay (1st title)
- Participants: 15
- Matches: 14
- Most runs: Vijay Merchant (Bombay) (389)
- Most wickets: A. G. Ram Singh (Madras) (22)
- Official website: http://www.bcci.tv

The 1934–35 Ranji Trophy was the inaugural edition of India's first-class cricket championship. The tournament was originally titled The Cricket Championship of India, but was renamed as the Ranji Trophy ahead of the 1935–36 edition. The first tournament ran from 4 November 1934 to 12 March 1935 and was contested in a knockout format by 15 teams divided into four zones. In the opening match, Madras defeated Mysore by an innings and 23 runs at the Chepauk Stadium and the match ended five minutes before close of play on the first day. It remains (to 2023) the only Ranji Trophy match to be completed in a single day's play. In the final, Bombay defeated Northern India by 208 runs at the Bombay Gymkhana Ground.

== Teams ==
The Board of Control for Cricket in India (BCCI) hoped for a nationwide participation but some states including Bengal, Bihar, and Rajputana declined or were unable to take part. The fifteen founder teams are listed alphabetically by zone and the sides that won each zonal title are in bold.

- **East Zone**
- **Central India** (now Madhya Pradesh)
- Central Provinces and Berar (now Vidarbha)
- **North Zone**
- Army (now Services)
- Delhi
- **Northern India**
- Southern Punjab (now Punjab)
- United Provinces (now Uttar Pradesh)
- **South Zone**
- **Hyderabad**
- Madras (now Tamil Nadu)
- Mysore (now Karnataka)
- **West Zone**
- **Bombay** (now Mumbai)
- Gujarat
- Maharashtra
- Sind
- Western India (now Saurashtra)

== Highlights ==
- The first match of the competition was held on 4 November 1934 between Madras and Mysore at Chepauk. M. J. Gopalan of Madras bowled the first ball to N. Curtis.
- Madras won the match by an innings and 23 runs, five minutes before the close of play on the first day. As of 2022, this is the only first-class match in India to finish in a single day.
- S. M. Hadi of Hyderabad hit the first century in the Ranji Trophy. He scored 132* against Madras at Secunderabad.
- George Abell of Northern India scored the first double hundred, with 210 v Army. In the same innings, he was involved in a partnership of 304 with Ahmed Raza.
- Abell scored a century before lunch on the second day (24* to 128*), the first such instance in the Ranji Trophy.
- Baqa Jilani took a hat-trick for Northern India v Southern Punjab in the semifinal at Amritsar.
- Southern Punjab was all out for 22 in the same innings. This remained the lowest team total in the Ranji Trophy until Hyderabad was all out for 21 against Rajasthan in 2010–11.
- Madras was intended to be the venue of the semi-final between Bombay and Hyderabad, but it was moved to Bombay as the cricket association in Madras was not in a position to host it. Subsequently, Hyderabad declined to travel, meaning the semi-final was a walkover to Bombay.

== Zonal Matches ==
=== East Zone ===
Round 1
26–27 December 1934 – Nagpur
Central Provinces and Berar	115 & 194
**Central India**	**237 & 79/0**

=== North Zone ===
Round 1
8–9 December 1934 – Agra
**United Provinces**	**228**
Delhi	37 & 92

Round 2
29–31 January 1935 – Patiala
**Southern Punjab**	**216**
United Provinces	56 & 119/3
4–6 December 1934 – Lahore
**Northern India**	**459**
Army	203 & 204

Round 3
5–7 February 1935 – Amritsar
Southern Punjab	135 & 22
**Northern India**	**142 & 106**

=== South Zone ===
Round 1
4 Nov 1934 – Chennai
**Madras**	**130**
Mysore	48 & 59

Round 2
23–25 Nov 1934 – Secunderabad
**Hyderabad**	**256 & 227**
Madras	301 & 169

=== West Zone ===
Round 1
2–4 February 1935 – Ahmedabad
Gujarat	106 & 166/4
**Bombay**	**231 & 300/7d**

Round 2
16–18 February 1935 – Pune
Maharashtra	260 & 72/1
**Bombay**	**286 & 172/7d**
16–18 November 1934 – Karachi
Sind	125 & 210
**Western India**	**219 & 118/6**

Round 3
23–25 February 1934 – Bombay
**Bombay**	**377 & 164**
Western India	154 & 241

== Inter-Zonal Knockout Stage ==
Semi-finals
**Bombay**	**Walkover**
Hyderabad
9–11 February 1935 – Amritsar
**Northern India**	**192 & 195**
Central India	145 & 243/6

Final
9–12 March 1935 – Bombay
**Bombay**	**266 & 300**
Northern India	219 & 139

== Final ==
9–12 March 1935
Scorecard

**Bombay (H)**	**v**	**Northern India**
266 (80.4 overs); Padmakar Chury 58; Mubarak Ali 4/71 (25 overs)		219 (82.2 overs); Ahmed Raza 50; Vijay Merchant 3/53 (19 overs)
300 (88.1 overs); Vijay Merchant 120; Devraj Puri 6/101 (27.1 overs)		139 (48.1 overs); Ahmed Raza 62*; Homi Vajifdar 8/40 (20.1 overs)

**Bombay won by 208 runs**
Bombay Gymkhana, Bombay
Umpires: J Birtwistle and Vali Ahmed

- Bombay won the toss and elected to bat.
