= 1957–58 Ranji Trophy =

Indian cricket tournament

- The Ranji Trophy
- Administrator: BCCI
- Cricket format: First-class
- Tournament format: Knockout
- Champions: Baroda (4th title)
- Participants: 22
- Most runs: Polly Umrigar (Bombay) (594)
- Most wickets: Ghulam Ahmed (Hyderabad) and V.V. Kumar (Madras) (28)

The 1957–58 Ranji Trophy was the 24th season of the Ranji Trophy. Baroda won the title defeating Services in the final. Vidarbha made their debut in the competition.

== Highlights ==
- The Zonal matches were played in a round-robin format, for the first time in Ranji Trophy history.
- Bombay conceded its last match in the West Zone match against Baroda when it became certain that Baroda would qualify from the West Zone. It would be twenty years, 124 matches and 18 Ranji titles before Bombay lost another match outright, against Gujarat in 1977–78.
- Prakash Bhandari hit 227 and took 4/34 and 5/47 for Delhi against Patiala

== Group stage ==
=== South Zone ===
Team	Pld	W	L	D	T	NR	Pts	Q
Hyderabad	4	3	0	1	0	0	29	1.574
Mysore	4	2	1	1	0	0	23	1.250
Madras	4	1	0	3	0	0	20	1.183
Andhra	4	1	2	1	0	0	13	1.086
Kerala	4	0	4	0	0	0	0	0.460

=== Central Zone ===
Team	Pld	W	L	D	T	NR	Pts	Q
Rajasthan	3	0	0	3	0	0	18	1.540
Uttar Pradesh	3	0	0	3	0	0	14	1.024
Madhya Pradesh	3	0	0	3	0	0	11	0.838
Vidarbha	3	0	0	3	0	0	10	0.748

=== North Zone ===
Team	Pld	W	L	D	T	NR	Pts	Q
Services	3	2	0	1	0	0	24	1.970
Delhi	3	2	0	1	0	0	20	1.673
Patiala	3	1	2	3	0	0	8	0.727
Eastern Punjab	3	0	3	0	0	0	0	0.481

=== West Zone ===
Team	Pld	W	L	D	T	NR	Pts	Q
Baroda	4	1	0	3	0	0	27	1.574
Bombay	4	1	0	3	0	0	24	1.250
Maharashtra	4	1	0	3	0	0	21	1.183
Gujarat	4	0	0	4	0	0	15	1.086
Saurashtra	4	0	3	1	0	0	3	0.460

=== East Zone ===
Team	Pld	W	L	D	T	NR	Pts	Q
Bengal	3	3	0	0	0	0	27	2.759
Bihar	3	2	1	0	0	0	18	1.688
Assam	3	0	2	1	0	0	5	0.598
Orissa	3	0	2	1	0	0	3	0.283

Points System

- Win : 8 points
- Draw (with First Innings Lead) : 5 points
- Draw (without First Innings Lead) : 3 points
- Lost : 0 points
- Bonus : 1 point

== Knockout stage ==
Quarter-finals
21 Feb 1958 – Hyderabad
Hyderabad	122 & 188
Bengal	310 & 4/0

Semi-finals
7 Feb 1958 – Udaipur
Rajasthan	256 & 127/2
Baroda	424
28 Feb 1958 – Delhi
Services	370/2
Bengal	360

Final
13 Mar 1958 – Baroda
Baroda	495
Services	239 & 205

=== Final ===
13–16 March 1958
Scorecard

Baroda (H)	v	Services
495 (171.4 overs); Vijay Hazare 203; C. B. Ramesh 3/58 (25 overs)		239 (113.1 overs); Mohinder Singh 73; Jyotirvadan Vin 4/32 (21.1 overs)
		205 f/o (85.1 overs); Mahipetsinhji 57; Vijay Hazare 3/17 (11 overs)

Baroda won by an innings and 51 runs
Moti Bagh Stadium, Baroda
Umpires: Noshirvan Nagarwala and M. G. Vijayasarathi

- Baroda won the toss and elected to bat.
- Vijay Hazare (Baroda) passed 6,000 runs in first-class matches.
