= 2020–21 Ranji Trophy =

Cricket tournament

- The Ranji Trophy, awarded to the winners
- Administrator(s): BCCI
- Cricket format: First-class cricket
- Tournament format(s): Round-robin then knockout
- Host(s): India

The 2020–21 Ranji Trophy was scheduled to be the 87th season of the Ranji Trophy, the premier first-class cricket tournament in India. Saurashtra were the defending champions. However, in January 2021, the Board of Control for Cricket in India (BCCI) confirmed that the season had been cancelled due to the COVID-19 pandemic. It was the first time since the tournament's inception in the 1934–35 season that the Ranji Trophy was not held.

== Background ==
Before the COVID-19 pandemic started, a change to the format of the tournament was submitted to the BCCI, splitting the elite teams into five groups, instead of three, therefore reducing the number of matches. However, in June 2020, the BCCI denied that any changes to the tournament's structure would be taking place. Also in June, Rahul Dravid, the head of cricket at the National Cricket Academy, suggested that the Indian domestic season could start later or be shortened due to the pandemic. On 19 July 2020, the Times of India reported that the Ranji Trophy would be the only senior domestic cricket tournament to be played in the Indian 2020–21 cricket season, with teams split into five zones, North, West, South, East and Central. In August 2020, the BCCI confirmed that hosting the Ranji Trophy was "a priority". The following month, the BCCI warned that the domestic cricket season could be severely curtailed due to the pandemic, including the possibility of no cricket taking place.

In December 2020, the BCCI confirmed the dates of the 2020–21 Syed Mushtaq Ali Trophy, with a decision on the Ranji Trophy due after the completion of the group stage of the Syed Mushtaq Ali Trophy. Originally, the tournament was scheduled to start on 1 January 2021. However, the start was delayed, with the BCCI looking to begin a reduced competition from February 2021. On 30 January, the BCCI cancelled the 2020–21 Ranji Trophy season, but gave the go-ahead for the 2020–21 Vijay Hazare Trophy to take place. An estimated 800 cricketers were impacted by the cancellation of the tournament, with each player due to be paid R140,000 per match.

== See also ==
- Impact of the COVID-19 pandemic on cricket
