= Mahesh Pithiya =

Indian cricketer

Personal information
- Born: December 24, 2001 (age 24); Junagadh
- Batting: Right-handed
- Bowling: Right-arm Offbreak

Domestic team information
- Years: Team
- Baroda

Career statistics
Competition	FC	LA
Matches	22	16
Runs scored	462	115
Batting average	17.11	14.37
100s/50s	0/3	0/0
Top score	54	22
Balls bowled	4446	743
Wickets	83	26
Bowling average	26.30	24.57
5 wickets in innings	6	0
10 wickets in match	0	0
Best bowling	6/25	4/44
Catches/stumpings	13/0	12/0

Mahesh Pithiya is an Indian cricketer.
