= Sultan Saleem =

Indian cricketer (1947–2019)

Personal information
- Born: 1947
- Died: 21 August 2019 (aged 71–72)
- Source: Cricinfo, 26 April 2021

Sultan Saleem (1947 – 21 August 2019) was an Indian cricketer. He played in 44 first-class matches, mainly for Hyderabad, from 1962/63 to 1975/76, including the final of the 1964–65 Ranji Trophy.

He studied at the All Saints High School.

He played for Osmania University and was part of the university team when it won the Rohinton Baria Trophy in 1966-67.

== See also ==
- List of Hyderabad cricketers
