= Northern India cricket team =

W/Q : Maxamed Cawil Xuseen

Team information
- Founded: 1890
- Last match: 1947

History
- First-class debut: Marylebone Cricket Club in 1926 at Lawrence Gardens, Lahore
- Ranji Trophy wins: 0

The Northern India cricket team was an Indian domestic cricket team that competed in the Ranji Trophy between 1934–35 and 1946–47. It played its home matches in Lahore.

Captained by George Abell, Northern India finished runner-up in the first Ranji Trophy in 1934–35. In the 10 seasons in which it competed in the Ranji Trophy, Northern India played 23 matches, winning 12, losing 9 and drawing 4, and reaching the semi-finals seven times.

After the establishment of Pakistan in 1947, players from Northern India formed the nucleus of the Pakistan cricket team. When Pakistan played its first match, against West Indies in November 1948, nine of the 11 players had played for Northern India in the Ranji Trophy.

== Leading players ==
The highest score was 210 by Abell against Army in 1934–35. The best bowling figures were 8 for 94 by Amir Elahi against Southern Punjab in 1937–38.
