= 2005–06 Ranji Trophy =

- The Ranji Trophy, which the winners receive
- Administrator: BCCI
- Cricket format: First-class cricket
- Tournament format(s): League and knockout
- Champions: Uttar Pradesh (1st title)
- Participants: 27
- Most runs: Ajay Jadeja (Rajasthan) (684)
- Most wickets: Ramesh Powar (Mumbai) (42)

The 2005–06 Ranji Trophy was the 72nd season of the Ranji Trophy. Uttar Pradesh won the final against Bengal on first innings lead and became the winner of Ranji Trophy, 2005–06, while the Saurashtra team clinched the Plate Group title.

== Timeline and Scorecards ==
- The top 8 teams from all the four sub-groups of the Elite and Plate Groups in the Ranji Trophy, 2005-06 were promoted to the knock out level of the tournament. The BCCI promoted the teams on the basis of the points that they earned from their respective group matches and the top two teams from each of the sub-groups got the promotion. The teams included the likes of Bengal, Baroda, Mumbai, Uttar Pradesh, Rajasthan, Orissa, Saurashtra and Madhya Pradesh. The first four teams played against each other in the Elite Group knock out matches with the aim of winning the coveted championship title of the Ranji Trophy, 2005–06. On the other hand, the rest of the four teams played in the Plate Group knock out matches for claiming one of the top two spots in the Plate Group. The teams tried so because the top two teams of the Plate Group got the promotion to the Elite Group in the next year's edition. The first of the knock out matches in the Ranji Trophy, 2005-06 was the first Semi-Final match of the Plate Group in the Ranji Trophy, 2005–06 and the teams of Rajasthan and Orissa were involved in the match. The match was held at Jaipur from 25 to 27 January 2006 and it saw the Rajasthan team winning by a huge margin of 9 wickets. The Rajasthan team also entered into the Plate Group Final by winning this match. In the second Semi-Final match of the Plate Group in the Ranji Trophy, 2005–06, the teams of Saurashtra and Madhya Pradesh played against each other at Rajkot from 25 to 29 January 2006. The match remained drawn during the specified period of time and the match officials allowed the Saurashtra team to advance to the Final of the Group. Thus, the Rajasthan and Saurashtra teams locked their horns together in the Final match of the Plate Group in the Ranji Trophy, 2005–06 and the two teams played the match at Rajkot from 02-5 February 2006. The Saurashtra team won the match by a good margin of an innings and 34 runs and also became the Plate Group Champion in the Ranji Trophy, 2005–06. The Rajasthan and Saurashtra teams also got the permission to play in the Elite Group of the next year's edition of the tournament. In the Elite Group, the teams of Bengal and Baroda played against each other in the first Semi-Final match of the Elite Group in the Ranji Trophy, 2005–06 and the two teams played the match at Kolkata from 20 to 24 January 2006. The match remained drawn during the stipulated duration and the Bengal team got the permission to play in the Final of the tournament. The second Semi-Final match of the Elite Group in the Ranji Trophy, 2005-06 involved the teams like Mumbai and Uttar Pradesh and the match was held at Mumbai from 20 to 23 January 2006. The Uttar Pradesh beat the Mumbai team by a good margin of 5 wickets in the match and set up a clash with the Bengal team in the Final of the group. Thus, the Final match of the Elite Group in the Ranji Trophy, 2005-06 saw the Bengal and Uttar Pradesh teams playing against each other at Lucknow from 29 January-2 February 2006. Both the teams played nicely in the match and as a result, the match went on to be a drawn one after the specified period of time. However, the match officials declared the Uttar Pradesh team as the winner of the match as well as the championship title, as it was having a lead in the first innings of the Final match.
- ESPNcricInfo

== Knockout Matches ==
=== Final ===
26–30 March 2004
Scorecard

Uttar Pradesh	v	Bengal
387 (124.3 overs); Mohammad Kaif 90 (158); Ranadeb Bose 3/86 (28.3 overs)		373 (126.4 overs); Laxmi Shukla 66 (125); Piyush Chawla 5/83 (35.4 overs)
342 (129.5 overs); Mohammad Kaif 109 (264); Shibsagar Singh 3/69 (39.5 overs)		109/5 (33 overs); Arindam Das 37 (81); Praveen Kumar 5/33 (9 overs)

Match drawn
KD Singh Babu Stadium, Lucknow
Umpires: Arani Jayaprakash and Ravi Subramanian

- Uttar Pradesh won the toss and elected to bat.
- Uttar Pradesh won the 2005-06 Ranji Trophy through its first innings lead.
