= Ranji Trophy =

First-class cricket championship in India

- Administrator: Board of Control for Cricket in India
- Format: First-class cricket
- First edition: 1934–35
- Tournament format: Round-robin, then knockout
- Number of teams: 38 (2025-26)
- Current champion: Jammu and Kashmir (1st title)
- Most successful: Mumbai (42 titles)
- Qualification: Irani Cup
- Most runs: Wasim Jaffer (12,038)
- Most wickets: Rajinder Goel (640)
- TV: JioHotstar
- Website: www.bcci.tv
- Longest continuous champion: Mumbai (15 titles)
- 2026–27

The Ranji Trophy is an annual domestic first-class cricket championship played in India. It is organised by the Board of Control for Cricket in India (BCCI), and teams representing the various member associations of the BCCI take part in the tournament. In the 2025–26 season, the competition was contested by 38 teams, including at least one team from each of the 28 states and four of the eight union territories. (Note: Delhi and Puducherry are represented by Delhi cricket team and Puducherry cricket team respectively. Jammu and Kashmir and Ladakh are represented by the Jammu and Kashmir cricket team.) The matches are held across various cricket grounds and stadiums in India.

The championship was first organised in 1934–35, with the inaugural match held between Madras and Mysore at the M. A. Chidambaram Stadium on 4 November 1934. When the tournament was founded, it was named as the "Cricket Championship of India". Before the second edition of the tournament in 1935–36, it was renamed after Ranjitsinhji, who was the first Indian to play international cricket. (Note: Ranjitsinhji played for England from 1896 to 1902. He was a prince from the princely state of Nawanagar and later became its ruler.) Since the inaugural edition, the tournament has been organised annually except in 2020–21, when it was suspended due to COVID-19.

Mumbai is the most successful team with 42 titles to its name. Jammu and Kashmir are the defending champion.

== History ==
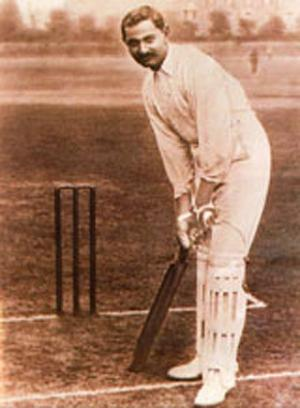
Ranjitsinhji, after whom the tournament is named

The Board of Control for Cricket in India (BCCI) was established on 1 December 1928 at Madras. Anthony de Mello, one of the founders of the BCCI, proposed the idea of a national level, first-class cricket championship during a meeting of the BCCI at Shimla in July 1934. Fifteen teams contested in the inaugural edition of the championship in 1934-35. The first match of the competition was held on 4 November 1934 between Madras and Mysore at the M. A. Chidambaram Stadium at Madras, and was completed on a single day.

Initially, the inaugural tournament was named as the "Cricket Championship of India". Bhupinder Singh, the Maharaja of Patiala, donated the trophy for the tournament, and suggested that it be named after Ranjitsinhji, the first Indian to play international cricket. The championship was renamed as "Ranji Trophy" ahead of the second season in 1935-36. The tournament has been held annually since its inception with the only exception in 2020-21, when the tournament was cancelled due to the COVID-19 pandemic.

== Competition format ==
From the inception of the championship in 1934-35 to the 2001-02 season, the teams were grouped geographically into four or five zones – North, West, East, and South, with the Central zone added in 1952-53. The number of teams in each zone varied across the seasons. In the 1948-49 Ranji Trophy, the 16 teams were grouped into one single group, as an exception. Initially, the matches were played on a knock-out basis until 1956-57, and thereafter on a league basis to determine a winner of each zonal group. The zonal winners competed in a knock-out round, leading to a final that decided the winner of the Ranji Trophy. From the 1970–71 season, the knock-out stage was expanded to accommodate top two teams from each zone, for a total of ten qualifying teams. This was expanded again to include the top three from each zone in 1992–93 for a total of fifteen qualifying teams. Between 1996–97 and 1999–2000, the fifteen qualifying teams competed in a secondary group stage, with three groups of five teams, and the top two from each group qualified for a six-team knock-out stage.

Ahead of the 2002–03 season, the zonal system was replaced by a two-tiered league comprising the Elite (higher tier) and Plate Groups (lower tier). The 15 teams in the Elite tier were divided into two sub-groups and played against the other teams in the group, with the winner of each sub-group competing for the title, while the bottom teams were relegated to the Plate Group for the next season. The 12 teams in the lower tier were organised into two groups, and played a round-robin tournament, with the winners earning promotion to the Elite Group for the next season. In the 2008–09 season, the format was adjusted to give the top teams from the Plate League groups to join the top three from each Super League (top tier) sub-group in an eight-team knock-out tournament, the winner was which was crowned the champion.

From the 2012–13 season, the format was altered with the 18 teams in the top tier divided into two groups (Groups A and B) of nine teams, who competed in eight matches (four at home and four away), while the second tier (Group C) had nine teams in a single group. The top three teams from Groups A and B and the top two from Group C contested the knockout phase. The lowest placed team in each of top tier groups was relegated to Group C, and the top two from Group C are promoted to the top tier. In the 2007-08 Ranji Trophy, 2008-09, and 2014-15 seasons, knockout-stage matches were held at neutral venues. In the 2016–17, all the matches were played at neutral venues. However, this was abandoned for the next season, in which the two-tier system was done away with and the teams were grouped into four groups of seven teams each with the top two qualifying for the quarter-finalis. From the 2018–19 season, the tournament had 37 teams, which were organised into three-tiers with five teams qualifying for the quarter-finals from the top tier (known as Elite Group A and Group B). Two teams from the second-tier (Elite Group C) and one team from the lower-tier (Plate Group) joined them in the quarter-finals.

The matches, which were played for three days during the inaugural season, was later held as four-day matches in the group stage, and five-day matches in knock-outs with a possible sixth day for the final in some seasons. In the group stages, teams have generally been awarded points for a win, and if the match did not yield a result, both the teams got points, with the team accumulating the lead in the first innings, being awarded the higher number of points. In the knockout stages, if there is no outright result, the team leading after the first innings is declared the winner.

=== Points distribution system ===
For the 2025-26 season, points are awarded for the league stage as follows:

Scenario	Points
Win	6
Bonus point for win by an inning or 10 wickets	1
Tied match	3
First innings lead in a drawn match	3
No result	1
Tie in first inning score in a drawn match	1
Loss based on first innings score in a drawn match	1
Loss	0

== Participants ==
Teams representing the various member associations of the BCCI take part in the tournament. There were 15 teams took part in the first tournament, Army, Bombay, Central India, Central Provinces and Berar, Delhi, Gujarat, Hyderabad, Madras, Maharashtra, Mysore, Northern India, Southern Punjab, Sind, United Provinces, and Western India. The teams that took part in the Ranji Trophy changed over the years, with the Partition of India in 1947, Reorganisation of Indian states in 1956, and the formation of new Indian states and territories. The tournament had 18 teams by 1936–37 season, and increased to 20 teams by 1947–48 season. By the 1959–60 season, 24 teams took part in the tournament, and which increased to 26 in 1985–86 season. Jharkhand joined for the 2004–05 season and Chhattisgarh took part for the first time in 2016–17. For the 2016–17 Ranji Trophy, nine new teams were added, based on the Lodha Committee recommendations. Chandigarh took part for the first time in 2019–20 season, taking the number to 38 teams.

As of the 2025–26 edition, 38 teams continued to take part in the tournament. There is at least one team representing each of the 28 states and five of the eight union territories. Hyderabad became the representative of the Telangana state formed in 2013. Apart from these 32 teams, Baroda, Mumbai, Saurashtra and Vidarbha, which are remnants from the teams fielded by the erstwhile territories and princely states before the Indian independence, continue to take part in the competition. Apart from this, Railways, and Services have representative teams in the competition.. Despite the Lodha committee recommendation to have one team representing each state or union territory, a ruling by the Supreme Court of India in 2018, resulted in the continuing participation of these teams.

=== 2025–26 season ===
Thirty eight teams participate in the 2025–26 Ranji Trophy:

Team (Note: Some teams have competed under different names in the past, while a few teams have been successors of erstwhile teams.)	Titles (Note: Western India cricket team was the winner in the 1943-44 Ranji Trophy, and is defunct.)	Runners-up (Note: Northern India cricket team was the runner-up in the 1934-35 Ranji Trophy, and is defunct.)	First season	First title	Recent title
Andhra	–	–	1953–54		
Arunachal Pradesh	–	–	2018–19		
Assam	–	–	1948–49		
Baroda	5	4	1937–38	1942–43	2000–01
Bengal	2	13	1935–36	1938–39	1989–90
Bihar	–	1	1936–37		
Chhattisgarh	–	–	2016–17		
Chandigarh	–	–	2019–20		
Delhi	7	8	1934–35	1978–79	2007–08
Goa	–	–	1985–86		
Gujarat	1	1	1935–36	2016–17	2016–17
Haryana	1	1	1970–71	1990–91	1990–91
Himachal Pradesh	–	–	1985–86		
Hyderabad	2	3	1934–35	1937–38	1986–87
Jammu and Kashmir	1	-	1959–60	2025–26	2025–26
Jharkhand	–	–	2004–05		
Karnataka (Note: Competed as Mysore cricket team till 1972-73.)	8	6	1934–35	1973–74	2014–15
Kerala (Note: Succeeded the Travancore-Cochin cricket team which competed from 1951-52 to 1957-58.)	–	1	1957–58		
Madhya Pradesh (Note: Competed as Holkar cricket team from 1941-42 to 1954-55, and as Madhya Bharat cricket team till 1949-50.)	5	7	1941–42	1945–46	2021–22
Maharashtra	2	3	1934–35	1939–40	1940–41
Manipur	–	–	2018–19		
Meghalaya	–	–	2018–19		
Mizoram	–	–	2018–19		
Mumbai (Note: Competed as Bombay cricket team from 1934-35 to 1995-96.)	42	6	1934–35	1934–35	2023–24
Nagaland	–	–	2018–19		
Odisha	–	–	1949–50		
Puducherry	–	–	2018–19		
Punjab (Note: Succeeded the Eastern Punjab cricket team (1950–51 to 1959–60), Northern Punjab cricket team (1960–61 to 1967-68), Patiala cricket team (1948–49, 1953–54 to 1958-59), and Southern Punjab cricket team (1934–35 to 1951–52, 1959–60 to 1967-68).)	1	3	1968–69	1992–93	1992–93
Railways	2	2	1958–59	2001–02	2004–05
Rajasthan (Note: Competed as Rajputana cricket team from 1935–36 to 1955-56.)	2	8	1935–36	2010–11	2011–12
Saurashtra (Note: Competed as Nawanagar cricket team from 1936–37 to 1946-47.)	3	4	1936–37	2019–20	2022–23
Sikkim	–	–	2018–19		
Services	–	2	1949–50		
Tamil Nadu (Note: Competed as Madras cricket team from 1934–35 to 1970-71.)	2	10	1934–35	1954–55	1987–88
Tripura	–	–	1985–86		
Uttar Pradesh (Note: Competed as United Provinces cricket team from 1934–35 to 1949-50.)	1	5	1934–35	2005–06	2005–06
Uttarakhand	–	-	2018–19		
Vidarbha	3	1	1957–58	2017–18	2024–25

=== Defunct teams ===
- Central India (1934/35 – 1940/41)
- Central Provinces and Berar (1934/35 – 1949/50)
- Northern India (1934/35 – 1946/47)
- Sind (1934/35 – 1947/48)
- Southern Punjab (1934/35 – 1951/52, 1959/60 – 1967/68)
- Western India (1934/35 – 1945/46)
- North West Frontier Province (1937/38 – 1946/47)
- Gwalior (1943/44)
- Patiala/PEPSU (1948/49, 1953/54 – 1958/59)
- Eastern Punjab (1950/51 – 1959/60)
- Travancore-Cochin (1951/52 – 1956/57)
- Northern Punjab (1960/61 – 1967/68)

== Stadiums ==
Stadium	City	Capacity	Home team
Narendra Modi Stadium	Ahmedabad	132,000	Gujarat
Eden Gardens	Kolkata	68,000	Bengal
Shaheed Veer Narayan Singh International Cricket Stadium	Raipur	65,000	Chhattisgarh
Rajiv Gandhi International Cricket Stadium	Hyderabad	55,000	Hyderabad
Ekana Cricket Stadium	Lucknow	55,000	Uttar Pradesh
Greenfield International Stadium	Thiruvananthapuram	55,000	Kerala
JSCA International Stadium Complex	Ranchi	50,000	Jharkhand
Barabati Stadium	Cuttack	45,000	Odisha
Rajgir International Cricket Stadium	Nalanda	45,000	Bihar
Vidarbha Cricket Association Stadium	Nagpur	45,000	Vidarbha
Arun Jaitley Cricket Stadium	New Delhi	41,842	Delhi
M. Chinnaswamy Stadium	Bengaluru	40,000	Karnataka
Assam Cricket Association Stadium	Guwahati	40,000	Assam
Maharashtra Cricket Association Stadium	Pune	37,406	Maharashtra
M. A. Chidambaram Stadium	Chennai	33,500	Tamil Nadu
Wankhede Stadium	Mumbai	33,108	Mumbai
Holkar Stadium	Indore	30,000	Madhya Pradesh
Maharaja Bir Bikram College Stadium	Agartala	30,000	Tripura
Sector 16 Stadium	Chandigarh	30,000	Chandigarh
Niranjan Shah Stadium	Rajkot	28,000	Saurashtra
I. S. Bindra Stadium	Mohali	26,000	Punjab
ACA–VDCA Cricket Stadium	Visakhapatnam	25,000	Andhra
Himachal Pradesh Cricket Association Stadium	Dharamshala	25,000	Himachal Pradesh
Rajiv Gandhi International Cricket Stadium	Dehradun	25,000	Uttarakhand
Sawai Mansingh Stadium	Jaipur	23,185	Rajasthan
Moti Bagh Stadium	Vadodara	18,000	Baroda
Mining Cricket Stadium	Rangpo	17,500	Sikkim
Chaudhary Bansi Lal Cricket Stadium	Rohtak	10,000	Haryana
D.R. Bendre Cricket Stadium	Hubli		Karnataka (second home)
SNR College Cricket Ground	Coimbatore	6,080	Tamil Nadu
Salem Cricket Foundation Stadium	Salem	5,000	Tamil Nadu
Sher-e-Kashmir Stadium	Srinagar	5,000	Jammu and Kashmir
Gandhi Memorial Science College Ground	Jammu	2,000	Jammu and Kashmir

== Players ==
Teams are selected by selection panels of respective member associations using player trials and past performance amongst others. Every association is allowed to register up to 50 players, who can be selected to the squad during the tournament. The registration and announcement of teams usually close a week before the start of the tournament. If a player has played for a different team in the past, and wishes to switch teams, he is required to get an approval from the BCCI and a no objection certificate from the previous association.

=== Renmuneration ===
The players involved in the tournament are paid a fixed salary by the BCCI based on the number of days played. The players are catergorised into three tiers based on the number of Ranji Trophy games played in their respective careers. A player who has played more than 40 games is paid ₹60,000 (US$620) per day, with ₹50,000 (US$520) to those who have played between 21 and 40 games and ₹40,000 (US$420) for those who have played less than 20 games. Reserve players are paid ₹30,000 (US$310), ₹25,000 (US$260), and ₹20,000 (US$210) in the respective categories.

== Seasons ==
=== Results of the final match ===
Season	Winner	Runner-up	Winning Captain	Venue
1934–35	Bombay	Northern India	L. P. Jai	Gymkhana Ground, Bombay
1935–36	Bombay	Madras	Hormasji Vajifdar	Feroz Shah Kotla, Delhi
1936–37	Nawanagar	Bengal	Albert Wensley	Gymkhana Ground, Bombay
1937–38	Hyderabad	Nawanagar	Syed Mohammed Hussain	Brabourne Stadium, Bombay
1938–39	Bengal	Southern Punjab	Tom Longfield	Eden Gardens, Calcutta
1939–40	Maharashtra	United Provinces	D. B. Deodhar	Poona Gymkhana Ground, Poona
1940–41	Maharashtra	Madras	D. B. Deodhar	Madras Cricket Club Ground, Chepauk, Madras
1941–42	Bombay	Mysore	Vijay Merchant	Brabourne Stadium, Bombay
1942–43	Baroda	Hyderabad	Wamanrao Ghorpade	Railways Recreation Club Ground, Secunderabad
1943–44	Western India	Bengal	Herbert Barritt	Brabourne Stadium, Bombay
1944–45	Bombay	Holkar	Vijay Merchant	Brabourne Stadium, Bombay
1945–46	Holkar	Baroda	C. K. Nayudu	Yeshwant Club Ground, Indore
1946–47	Baroda	Holkar	Raosaheb Nimbalkar	Central College Ground, Baroda
1947–48	Holkar	Bombay	C. K. Nayudu	Yeshwant Club Ground, Indore
1948–49	Bombay	Baroda	K. C. Ibrahim	Brabourne Stadium, Bombay
1949–50	Baroda	Holkar	Raosaheb Nimbalkar	Maharaja Pratapsingh Coronation Gymkhana Ground, Baroda
1950–51	Holkar	Gujarat	C. K. Nayudu	Yeshwant Club Ground, Indore
1951–52	Bombay	Holkar	Madhav Mantri	Brabourne Stadium, Bombay
1952–53	Holkar	Bengal	C. K. Nayudu	Eden Gardens, Calcutta
1953–54	Bombay	Holkar	Ranga Sohoni	Yeshwant Club Ground, Indore
1954–55	Madras	Holkar	Balu Alaganan	Yeshwant Club Ground, Indore
1955–56	Bombay	Bengal	Madhav Mantri	Eden Gardens, Calcutta
1956–57	Bombay	Services	Madhav Mantri	Roshanara Club Ground, Delhi
1957–58	Baroda	Services	Datta Gaekwad	Moti Bagh Stadium, Baroda
1958–59	Bombay	Bengal	Madhav Apte	Brabourne Stadium, Bombay
1959–60	Bombay	Mysore	Polly Umrigar	Brabourne Stadium, Bombay
1960–61	Bombay	Rajasthan	Polly Umrigar	Bhupal Noble's College Ground, Udaipur
1961–62	Bombay	Rajasthan	Madhav Apte	Brabourne Stadium, Bombay
1962–63	Bombay	Rajasthan	Polly Umrigar	Maharaja College Ground, Jaipur
1963–64	Bombay	Rajasthan	Bapu Nadkarni	Brabourne Stadium, Bombay
1964–65	Bombay	Hyderabad	Bapu Nadkarni	Lal Bahadur Shastri Stadium, Hyderabad
1965–66	Bombay	Rajasthan	Bapu Nadkarni	Railway Cricket Ground, Jaipur
1966–67	Bombay	Rajasthan	Manohar Hardikar	Brabourne Stadium, Bombay
1967–68	Bombay	Madras	Manohar Hardikar	Brabourne Stadium, Bombay
1968–69	Bombay	Bengal	Ajit Wadekar	Brabourne Stadium, Bombay
1969–70	Bombay	Rajasthan	Ajit Wadekar	Brabourne Stadium, Bombay
1970–71	Bombay	Maharashtra	Sudhir Naik	Brabourne Stadium, Bombay
1971–72	Bombay	Bengal	Ajit Wadekar	Brabourne Stadium, Bombay
1972–73	Bombay	Tamil Nadu	Ajit Wadekar	Madras Cricket Club Ground, Chepauk, Madras
1973–74	Karnataka	Rajasthan	E. A. S. Prasanna	Sawai Mansingh Stadium, Jaipur
1974–75	Bombay	Karnataka	Ashok Mankad	Wankhede Stadium, Bombay
1975–76	Bombay	Bihar	Ashok Mankad	Keenan Stadium, Jamshedpur
1976–77	Bombay	Delhi	Sunil Gavaskar	Feroz Shah Kotla, Delhi
1977–78	Karnataka	Uttar Pradesh	E. A. S. Prasanna	Narendra Mohan Sports Stadium, Mohan Nagar
1978–79	Delhi	Karnataka	Bishan Singh Bedi	M. Chinnaswamy Stadium, Bangalore
1979–80	Delhi	Bombay	Bishan Singh Bedi	Feroz Shah Kotla, Delhi
1980–81	Bombay	Delhi	Eknath Solkar	Wankhede Stadium, Bombay
1981–82	Delhi	Karnataka	Mohinder Amarnath	Feroz Shah Kotla, Delhi
1982–83	Karnataka	Bombay	Brijesh Patel	Wankhede Stadium, Bombay
1983–84	Bombay	Delhi	Sunil Gavaskar	Wankhede Stadium, Bombay
1984–85	Bombay	Delhi	Sunil Gavaskar	Wankhede Stadium, Bombay
1985–86	Delhi	Haryana	Madan Lal	Feroz Shah Kotla, Delhi
1986–87	Hyderabad	Delhi	M. V. Narasimha Rao	Feroz Shah Kotla, Delhi
1987–88	Tamil Nadu	Railways	S. Vasudevan	M. A. Chidambaram Stadium, Chepauk, Madras
1988–89	Delhi	Bengal	Madan Lal	Feroz Shah Kotla, Delhi
1989–90	Bengal	Delhi	Sambaran Banerjee	Eden Gardens, Calcutta
1990–91	Haryana	Bombay	Kapil Dev	Wankhede Stadium, Bombay
1991–92	Delhi	Tamil Nadu	Ajay Sharma	Feroz Shah Kotla, Delhi
1992–93	Punjab	Maharashtra	Gursharan Singh	Punjab Agricultural University Ground, Ludhiana
1993–94	Bombay	Bengal	Ravi Shastri	Wankhede Stadium, Bombay
1994–95	Bombay	Punjab	Sachin Tendulkar	Wankhede Stadium, Bombay
1995–96	Karnataka	Tamil Nadu	Anil Kumble	M. A. Chidambaram Stadium, Chepauk, Madras
1996–97	Mumbai	Delhi	Sanjay Manjrekar	Captain Roop Singh Stadium, Gwalior
1997–98	Karnataka	Uttar Pradesh	Rahul Dravid	M. Chinnaswamy Stadium, Bangalore
1998–99	Karnataka	Madhya Pradesh	Sunil Joshi	M. Chinnaswamy Stadium, Bangalore
1999–00	Mumbai	Hyderabad	Sameer Dighe	Wankhede Stadium, Mumbai
2000–01	Baroda	Railways	Jacob Martin	Gujarat State Fertilizer Corporation Ground, Vadodara
2001–02	Railways	Baroda	Abhay Sharma	Karnail Singh Stadium, Delhi
2002–03	Mumbai	Tamil Nadu	Paras Mhambrey	Wankhede Stadium, Mumbai
2003–04	Mumbai	Tamil Nadu	Sairaj Bahutule	M. A. Chidambaram Stadium, Chepauk, Chennai
2004–05	Railways	Punjab	Sanjay Bangar	Punjab Cricket Association Stadium, Mohali
2005–06	Uttar Pradesh	Bengal	Mohammad Kaif	K. D. Singh Babu Stadium, Lucknow
2006–07	Mumbai	Bengal	Amol Muzumdar	Wankhede Stadium, Mumbai
2007–08	Delhi	Uttar Pradesh	Gautam Gambhir	Wankhede Stadium, Mumbai
2008–09	Mumbai	Uttar Pradesh	Wasim Jaffer	Rajiv Gandhi International Cricket Stadium, Uppal, Hyderabad
2009–10	Mumbai	Karnataka	Wasim Jaffer	Gangothri Glades Cricket Ground, Mysore
2010–11	Rajasthan	Baroda	Hrishikesh Kanitkar	Moti Bagh Stadium, Vadodara
2011–12	Rajasthan	Tamil Nadu	Hrishikesh Kanitkar	M. A. Chidambaram Stadium, Chepauk, Chennai
2012–13	Mumbai	Saurashtra	Ajit Agarkar	Wankhede Stadium, Mumbai
2013–14	Karnataka	Maharashtra	Vinay Kumar	Rajiv Gandhi International Cricket Stadium, Uppal, Hyderabad
2014–15	Karnataka	Tamil Nadu	Vinay Kumar	Wankhede Stadium, Mumbai
2015–16	Mumbai	Saurashtra	Aditya Tare	Maharashtra Cricket Association Stadium, Gahunje, Pune
2016–17	Gujarat	Mumbai	Parthiv Patel	Holkar Stadium, Indore
2017–18	Vidarbha	Delhi	Faiz Fazal	Holkar Stadium, Indore
2018–19	Vidarbha	Saurashtra	Faiz Fazal	Vidarbha Cricket Association Stadium, Nagpur
2019–20	Saurashtra	Bengal	Jaydev Unadkat	Saurashtra Cricket Association Stadium, Rajkot
2020–21	Season cancelled due to the COVID-19 pandemic			
2021–22	Madhya Pradesh	Mumbai	Aditya Shrivastava	M. Chinnaswamy Stadium, Bengaluru
2022–23	Saurashtra	Bengal	Jaydev Unadkat	Eden Gardens, Kolkata
2023–24	Mumbai	Vidarbha	Ajinkya Rahane	Wankhede Stadium, Mumbai
2024–25	Vidarbha	Kerala	Akshay Wadkar	Vidarbha Cricket Association Stadium, Nagpur
2025–26	Jammu and Kashmir	Karnataka	Paras Dogra	DR Bendre Karnataka State Cricket Association Stadium, Hubli

=== Finals appearances by team ===
Team	Winner	Runner-up	Win %	Last win
Mumbai / Bombay	42	6	87.50	2024
Karnataka / Mysore	8	7	53.33	2015
Delhi	7	8	46.67	2008
Baroda	5	4	55.56	2001
Holkar	4	6	40.00	1953
Vidarbha	3	1	75.00	2025
Saurashtra	2	3	40.00	2023
Bengal	2	13	13.33	1990
Tamil Nadu / Madras	2	10	16.67	1988
Rajasthan / Rajputana	2	8	20.00	2012
Hyderabad	2	3	40.00	1987
Maharashtra	2	3	40.00	1941
Railways	2	2	50.00	2005
Madhya Pradesh	1	1	50.00	2022
Nawanagar	1	1	50.00	1937
Uttar Pradesh / United Provinces	1	5	16.67	2006
Punjab	1	2	33.33	1993
Haryana	1	1	50.00	1991
Gujarat	1	1	50.00	2017
Western India	1	0	100.00	1944
Jammu and Kashmir	1	0	100.00	2026
Southern Punjab	0	1	0.00	
Services	0	2	0.00	
Bihar	0	1	0.00	
Northern India	0	1	0.00	
Kerala	0	1	0.00	

== Statistics ==
Team records
Most trophies wins	42	Mumbai	1934–2024
Highest team score	935/5 dec.	Hyderabad v Andhra	1993–94
Lowest team score	21	Hyderabad v Rajasthan	2010

Individual match records
Highest individual innings	443*	B. B. Nimbalkar	Maharashtra v Kathiawar	1948–49
Best innings bowling	10/20	Premangsu Chatterjee	Bengal v Assam	1956–57
Best match bowling	16/99	Anil Kumble	Karnataka v Kerala	1994–95

Individual season records
Most runs in a season	1,415	V. V. S. Laxman	Hyderabad	1999–2000
Most centuries in a season	8	VVS Laxman	Hyderabad	1999–2000
Most wickets in a season	69	Harsh Dubey	Vidarbha	2024-25

Individual career records
Most career matches	155	Wasim Jaffer	1996–2020
Most career runs	12,038	Wasim Jaffer	1996–2020
Most career centuries	40	Wasim Jaffer	1996–2020
Highest career batting average	98.35	Vijay Merchant	1934–51
Most career wickets	640^{†}	Rajinder Goel	1958–85

^{†} Some sources credit Goel with 636 or 640 wickets instead.

== Broadcasting ==
Star Sports Network television channels and JioHotstar hold the rights to broadcast the trophy on television and online respectively. Match highlights are streamed on the official website of the BCCI.

== In popular culture ==
- The tournament featured in the 2019 Telugu film Jersey, in which the protagonist Arjun represents the Hyderabad cricket team in the Ranji Trophy in the 1980s and 1990s.

== See also ==
- Deodhar Trophy
- Duleep Trophy
- Irani Cup (Note: Irani Cup is single match tournament, in which last season's Ranji Trophy champion play against the Rest of India cricket team. The match is organised annually at the beginning of the Indian domestic cricket season.)
- Syed Mushtaq Ali Trophy
- Vijay Hazare Trophy
