= Sarkar Talwar =

Indian cricketer (born 1952)

Sarkar Talwar (born 22 September 1952 in Agra) is an Indian former cricketer who played first class cricket for Haryana as a right-arm offbreak bowler between 1967–68 and 1987–88.
