= Sudhendu Bhattacharya =

Indian cricket umpire (1920–1999)

Sukhendu Bhattacharya
Personal information
- Full name: Sukhendu Kumar Bhattacharya
- Born: 1 April 1920; Calcutta, India
- Died: 7 May 1999 (aged 79); Delhi, India

Umpiring information
- Tests umpired: 2 (1964–1969)
- Source: Cricinfo, 1 July 2013

Sukhendu Bhattacharya (1 April 1920 – 7 May 1999) was an Indian cricket umpire. He stood in two Test matches between 1964 and 1969.

== See also ==
- List of Test cricket umpires
