= Gulabrai Ramchand =

Indian cricketer (1927–2003)

Personal information
- Full name: Gulabrai Sipahimalani Ramchand
- Born: 26 July 1927; Karachi, Sind, British India
- Died: 8 September 2003 (aged 76); Mumbai, Maharashtra, India
- Batting: Right-handed
- Bowling: Right-arm medium-fast

International information
- National side: India
- Test debut (cap 61): 5 June 1952 v England
- Last Test: 23 January 1960 v Australia

Domestic team information
- Years: Team
- 1945/46–1946/47: Sind
- 1948/49–1962/63: Bombay
- 1956/57: Rajasthan

Career statistics
Competition	Tests	First-class
Matches	33	145
Runs scored	1,180	6,026
Batting average	24.58	36.30
100s/50s	2/5	16/28
Top score	109	230*
Balls bowled	4,976	18,086
Wickets	41	255
Bowling average	46.31	29.48
5 wickets in innings	1	9
10 wickets in match	0	0
Best bowling	6/49	8/12
Catches/stumpings	20/–	105/–
- Source: ESPNcricinfo

Gulabrai Sipahimalani "Ram" Ramchand (26 July 1927 – 8 September 2003) was an Indian cricketer, cricket coach and administrator who played for the national team in 33 Test matches between 1952 and 1960. In his only series as captain, he led India to its first win against Australia. According to Wisden Asia, he was one of the first cricketers to have endorsed commercial brands.

== Early life ==
Ramchand was born on 26 July 1927 in Karachi, British India (now in Pakistan) into a Sindhi family. He began his cricket career playing for Sind, and, after the Partition of India, he settled in Bombay.

== Career ==
=== First-class ===
Ramchand made his first-class debut for Sind against Maharashtra in the 1945–46 Ranji Trophy. He represented Sind in two more first-class matches, before making the switch to Bombay at the 1948–49 Ranji Trophy. In the Ranji final that season, he scored a pair of fifties (55 not out and 80 not out), batting at number 10, as Bombay registered a win.

Ramchand was part of the Bombay team in five more Ranji wins, scoring a hundred in all five finals. He scored 149 in the 1951–52 final against Holkar, 106 in the 1959–60 final against Mysore, 118 in the 1960–61 final against Rajasthan, 100 in the 1961–62 final against Rajasthan, and 102 not out in the 1962–63 final against Rajasthan.

=== International ===
Ramchand was picked in the Indian squad for the England tour in 1952 with his selection being called a "surprise". He was dismissed for a pair of ducks in his debut Test at Headingley. He played all four Tests on the tour, and managed only 68 runs and 4 wickets in the series. His performance improved on the West Indies tour in 1952–53, when he was not only promoted up the order but also given the new ball. He made 249 runs at an average of 24.90 in the five-match series and took 8 wickets.

When India toured Pakistan for five Tests in early 1955, Ramchand averaged 26.90 with the bat and took 10 wickets. His notable performances in the series included a knock of 53 in the second Test after India were reduced to 103 for 7, and career-best bowling figures of 6 for 49 in the fifth Test match at Karachi.

Ramchand scored his maiden Test hundred (unbeaten 106) against New Zealand at Calcutta in December 1955. His second Test hundred came at his home ground Brabourne Stadium against Australia in October 1956, when he made 109 against a bowling attack consisting of Ray Lindwall, Pat Crawford, Alan Davidson and Richie Benaud. His knock which included 19 fours was described as "an innings of guts and gumption, studded with rasping square-cuts and full-blooded hooks."

Ramchand's next series came two years later when the West Indies toured India for three Tests. In an otherwise unsuccessful series, his unbeaten 67 in the first match ensured India held on for a draw.

In December 1959, Ramchand was named captain for the five-match series against Australia. Although his individual performance in the series was unimpressive with averages of 12.33 with the bat and 200 with the ball, Ramchand's captaincy was praised in the media as he led India to its first Test win against Australia, in the second match at Kanpur. India lost the series 1–2 amid expectations of a whitewash victory for the strong Australian team. Chandu Borde recollected that Ramchand captained the team "brilliantly to victory" and that he was "always giving us the self-belief that we could beat them." This was also his last series for India.

== Playing style ==
Ramchand was an aggressive middle-order batsman who also often opened the bowling. Wisden Asia, in its obituary, described him as "a brilliant all-rounder: an explosive batsman, a very good opening bowler and a superb close catcher." Although strongly built, Ramchand was a medium-pace swing bowler and mainly relied on the inswinger. Cricket writer Sujit Mukherjee once said that Ramchand "looked every inch a fast bowler until he actually bowled."

As a captain, Ramchand was remembered by his teammates as a leader who instilled self-belief in them and motivated them.

== Later life and death ==
Ramchand worked as the manager of the Indian team at the 1975 Cricket World Cup. He worked 26 years for Air India, having served as station manager in Bangkok and Hong Kong. In 1995, he recovered after suffering a cardiac arrest.

Ramchand suffered three heart attacks in the two months preceding his death. He was admitted to the Hinduja Hospital in Mumbai on 1 September 2003, and, days before his death, asked the Board of Control for Cricket in India (BCCI) for financial help for his treatment. The BCCI granted ₹ 2 lakhs for the treatment, saying further financial assistance would be provided if required. On 5 September, it was reported that he had been discharged from the intensive care unit (ICU). His wife Leela Ramchand stated that "he had to be shifted out of the ICU as we cannot afford it." He died on 8 September in the hospital due to "heart complications".

Preceded by Datta Gaekwad	Indian national cricket captain 1959/60	Succeeded by Nari Contractor
