= Manohar Hardikar =

Indian cricketer

Personal information
- Full name: Manohar Shankar Hardikar
- Born: 8 February 1936; Baroda, British India
- Died: 4 February 1995 (aged 58); Bombay, Maharashtra, India
- Batting: Right-handed
- Bowling: Right-arm off-break; Right-arm medium

International information
- National side: India
- Test debut (cap 85): 28 November 1958 v West Indies
- Last Test: 12 December 1958 v West Indies

Career statistics
Competition	Test	First-class
Matches	2	74
Runs scored	56	2,592
Batting average	18.67	45.46
100s/50s	0/0	8/20
Top score	32*	207*
Balls bowled	108	5916
Wickets	1	74
Bowling average	55.00	31.66
5 wickets in innings	0	2
10 wickets in match	0	0
Best bowling	1/9	8/39
Catches/stumpings	3	49
- Source: CricketArchive, 3 September 2022

Manohar Shankar Hardikar (8 February 1936 – 4 February 1995) was an Indian Test cricketer.

Hardikar represented India in two Tests against West Indies in 1958–59. He was dismissed by Roy Gilchrist off the very first ball that he faced in Test cricket. He then took a wicket with his third ball in Test cricket by dismissing Rohan Kanhai. In the second innings, he scored 32* and added 85* with G.S. Ramchand which saved India from a possible defeat.

In the next Test at Kanpur, Hardikar was hit on the head by a beamer from Wes Hall. Hall had been angered by no-ball calls from the umpire Mohammad Yunus. The ball hit Hardikar behind his left ear and knocked him down. He played no more international matches but was indirectly involved in the controversy that led to the resignation of Polly Umrigar later in the series.

Hardikar played for Bombay from 1955–56 to 1967–68. In the Ranji final in his first year, he took a career best 8 for 39 against Bengal. He captained Bombay in twelve matches, winning five and drawing the rest. Bombay won the title in 1965–66 and 1967–68 under his captaincy.

Hardikar died of cancer in 1995.
