= Ramakant Desai =

Indian cricket player (1939–1998)

Personal information
- Full name: Ramakant Bhikaji Desai
- Born: 20 June 1939; Bombay, British India
- Died: 27 April 1998 (aged 58); Mumbai, India
- Nickname: Tiny
- Height: 5 ft 4 in (1.63 m)
- Batting: Right-handed
- Bowling: Right-arm fast
- Role: Bowler

International information
- National side: India (1959–1968)
- Test debut (cap 90): 6 February 1959 v West Indies
- Last Test: 15 February 1968 v New Zealand

Career statistics
Competition	Tests	First-class
Matches	28	150
Runs scored	418	2,384
Batting average	13.48	18.19
100s/50s	0/1	1/9
Top score	85	107
Balls bowled	5,597	23,906
Wickets	74	468
Bowling average	37.31	24.10
5 wickets in innings	2	22
10 wickets in match	–	2
Best bowling	6/56	7/46
Catches/stumpings	9/0	50/0
- Source: ESPNcricinfo, 3 February 2021

Ramakant Bhikaji Desai (20 June 1939 in Bombay – 27 April 1998 in Mumbai) was an Indian cricketer who represented India in Test cricket as a fast bowler from 1959 to 1968.

Ramakant Desai was an Indian fast bowler, who stood 5 feet 4 inches tall, earning him the nickname "Tiny". He made his Test debut against West Indies in 1958–59 took 4/169 in 49 overs. He troubled the batsmen with bouncers, which was unusual for an Indian bowler at the time.

He toured England in 1959, West Indies in 1961–62 and Australia and New Zealand in 1967–68. Against Pakistan in 1960–61, he took 21 wickets in the series. At Bombay, he scored a quick 85 batting at No.10, an Indian record, and added a record 149 for the ninth wicket with Nana Joshi. His best bowling performance in Tests was 6 for 56 against New Zealand at Bombay in 1964–65. At Dunedin in 1967–68 his jaw was fractured by a ball from Dick Motz, despite which he added 57 runs for the last wicket with Bishen Bedi.

In his first year in the Ranji Trophy, he took 50 wickets in 7 matches at an average of 11.10. It is still a record for Bombay. It included a performance of 5 for 10 and 6 for 28 against Saurashtra. In the Ranji Trophy final in 1960–61 he took 7 for 46 and 4 for 74 in Bombay's victory over Rajasthan. Two years later, also against Rajasthan in the final, he scored his only first-class century, 107, in another victory. In his 11 years in the Bombay team (1958–59 to 1968–69), he never finished in a losing side. Desai announced his retirement at the prize distribution ceremony of the 1968–69 Ranji Trophy final.

As the only bowler of pace in the Indian team, he was perennially overworked. When Desai retired from regular first-class cricket after the 1968–69 season, when still only 29 years old, P.N. Sundaresan wrote that he "bowled his heart out on the dead pitches in India ... A more judicious use of his talent both in the Ranji Trophy and other matches could have preserved him as a penetrating bowler for a longer period."

Desai was the chairman of selectors from 1996 to 1997. He resigned the post a month before his death. He died four days after being admitted in a hospital in Mumbai from cardiac arrest.

Preceded by Gundappa Viswanath	Chairman, Selection Committee; October 1996 – March 1998	Succeeded by Kishan Rungta
