= Madhav Mantri =

Indian cricketer (1921–2014)

M. K. Mantri
Personal information
- Full name: Madhav Krishnaji Mantri
- Born: 1 September 1921; Nashik, Bombay Presidency, British India
- Died: 23 May 2014 (aged 92); Mumbai, Maharashtra, India
- Batting: Right-handed
- Bowling: Right-arm medium
- Role: Wicketkeeper-batsman
- Relatives: Sunil Gavaskar (nephew); Gundappa Viswanath (nephew); Rohan Gavaskar (grand-nephew)

International information
- National side: India (1951–1955)
- Test debut (cap 56): 14 December 1951 v England
- Last Test: 4 January 1955 v Pakistan

Domestic team information
- Years: Team
- Maharashta
- Mumbai

Career statistics
Competition	Test	First-class
Matches	4	95
Runs scored	67	4,403
Batting average	9.57	33.86
100s/50s	0/0	7/26
Top score	39	200
Balls bowled	–	187
Wickets	–	3
Bowling average	–	40.33
5 wickets in innings	–	0
10 wickets in match	–	0
Best bowling	–	2/38
Catches/stumpings	8/1	136/56
- Source: ESPNcricinfo, 29 April 2022

Madhav Krishnaji Mantri (1 September 1921 – 23 May 2014) was an Indian cricketer who played in four Test matches between 1951 and 1955. Born in Nasik, Maharashtra, he was a right-handed opening batsman and specialist wicket-keeper who represented Mumbai. He captained Mumbai to victory in three Ranji Trophy finals: 1951–52, 1955–56 and 1956–57. He captained Associated Cement Company to victory in the Moin-ud-Dowlah Gold Cup Tournament in 1962–63.

Mantri played his first Test against England in India in 1951–52 and toured England with the Indian team in 1952 (playing two Tests), and Pakistan in 1954–55 (one Test). His highest score was 200 for Mumbai in their victory over Maharashtra in a semi-final of the Ranji Trophy in 1948–49. It was the highest of nine centuries in a match in which 2376 runs were scored, which is still a record in first-class cricket.

He was among the four victims (others being Pankaj Roy, Dattajirao Gaekwad and Vijay Manjrekar) in India's miserable 0–4 start in the second innings of the Headingley Test of 1952 with Fred Trueman playing havoc.

Mantri was the uncle of former Indian cricket captain Sunil Gavaskar and former India batsman Gundappa Viswanath .Until his death, he lived in Hindu Colony, Dadar, Mumbai, and was the oldest living Indian Test cricketer. He suffered a heart attack on 1 May 2014 and was hospitalized at a private clinic. He died following another heart attack on 23 May 2014.
