= Patiala cricket team =

First-class cricket team of Patiala, India

Team information
- Founded: 1898
- Last match: 1959
- Home ground: Baradari Ground

History
- First-class debut: Marylebone Cricket Club in 1927 at Baradari Ground, Patiala
- Ranji Trophy wins: 0

The Patiala cricket team was a first-class cricket team representing Patiala (Patiala State before 1947) in Indian domestic competitions. The team competed in the Ranji Trophy in the 1948–49, 1955–56, 1957–58 and 1958–59 seasons. They played their home matches at the Baradari Ground (now known as the Dhruve Pandove Stadium) in Patiala.

Patiala played 14 first-class matches, with the first being a two-day match against Marylebone Cricket Club in February 1927 and the last coming in January 1959 against the Railways cricket team in the 1958–59 Ranji Trophy.

All parts of the State of Punjab, including Patiala, now come under the authority of the Punjab Cricket Association, represented by the Punjab cricket team. Dhruve Pandove Stadium is one of Punjab's main home grounds.

== See also ==
- Southern Punjab cricket team
- Eastern Punjab cricket team
- Northern Punjab cricket team
- Punjab cricket team
