= Bapu Nadkarni =

Indian cricketer (1933–2020)

Personal information
- Full name: Rameshchandra Gangaram Nadkarni
- Born: 4 April 1933; Nashik, Bombay Presidency, British India
- Died: 17 January 2020 (aged 86); Pune, Maharashtra, India
- Batting: Left-handed
- Bowling: Slow left arm orthodox

International information
- National side: India
- Test debut (cap 80): 16 December 1955 v New Zealand
- Last Test: 12 March 1968 v New Zealand

Career statistics
Competition	Test	First-class
Matches	41	191
Runs scored	1,414	8,880
Batting average	25.70	40.36
100s/50s	1/7	14/46
Top score	122*	283*
Balls bowled	9,165	38,193
Wickets	88	500
Bowling average	29.07	21.37
5 wickets in innings	4	19
10 wickets in match	1	1
Best bowling	6/43	6/17
Catches/stumpings	22/–	140/–
- Source: CricketArchive, 11 February 2020

Rameshchandra Gangaram "Bapu" Nadkarni (4 April 1933 – 17 January 2020) was an Indian international cricketer, mainly known for being an economical bowler. The chances of scoring against him was either nil, or negligible.

Nadkarni bowled a record 21.5 consecutive overs (131 balls) without conceding a run against England in Madras on 12 January 1964.

== Career ==
Nadkarni was famous for bowling an unerring line to batsmen which made it nearly impossible to score. It is often told that he used to put a coin on the pitch when he practiced in the nets, and would practice hitting the coin with every delivery. He had a career economy rate of less than 2.00 runs per over.

Nadkarni was perhaps best known for his bowling in the Madras Test against England in 1963–64. His figures at the end of third day of the match, bowling mostly against Brian Bolus and Ken Barrington, read 29 overs, 26 maidens, and no wickets for three runs. He finished with figures of 32-27-5-0 and bowled a record twenty one consecutive maiden overs (131 dot balls in a row) in a 114-minute bowling spell. In the final Test of that series, Nadkarni hit 52* and 122*. It remained his only hundred in Test cricket.

Nadkarni took 5/31 and 6/91 against Australia in Madras in 1964–65, but with the emergence of Bishen Bedi as a left arm spinner, his chances became scarce. He was dropped from the tour of England in 1967 but, in New Zealand that winter, he bowled India to a win at Wellington with career best figures of 6/43. On return from this trip, he announced his retirement from first-class cricket.

Nadkarni represented Maharashtra in Ranji Trophy from 1951–52 to 1959-60 and Bombay thereafter until 1967–68. He scored 201* and took 6/17 and 3/38 against Saurashtra in 1957-58 and 167 and seven wickets in the match against Gujarat in 1958–59. His highest score was the six hour innings of 283* against Delhi in the 1960-61 semifinal.

He went on to work as the national team's assistant manager, and was a mentor to Sunil Gavaskar. "His favourite term from where we all learned from was ‘chhodo mat’,” Gavaskar said following his death. It means hang in there. “Chhodo mat. You are playing for India. That thing we learned from him".

== Notes ==
- Nadkarni bowled 21 maiden overs, or 131 scoreless balls, in succession. The record for most consecutive balls without conceding a run is held by Hugh Tayfield of South Africa, who bowled 137 dot balls, or 16 eight-ball overs, across two innings against England at Durban, in 1956–57. In first-class cricket, Nadkarni comes third after Tayfield and Manish Majithia of Madhya Pradesh, who bowled 136 dot balls in a row against Railways in 1999–00.
- The records for maidens in succession with different balls-per-over are :

4 ball overs : 23 – Alfred Shaw, North v South, Nottingham, 1876
5 ball overs : 10 – Ernie Robson, Somerset v Sussex, Hove, 1897
6 ball overs : 21 – Bapu Nadkarni, India v England, Madras, 1963-64
8 ball overs : 14 – Hugh Tayfield, South Africa v England, Durban, 1956-57
