= Northern Punjab cricket team =

Indian cricket team

Team information
- Founded: 1903
- Last match: 1967

History
- First-class debut: Marylebone Cricket Club in 1926 at Lawrence Gardens, Lahore
- Ranji Trophy wins: 0

The Northern Punjab cricket team was an Indian domestic cricket team representing the northern part of the Indian state of Punjab during the time of the British Raj and later the northern part of its Indian successor, following the partition of India.

The team first played first-class cricket in 1926 against a touring MCC team. It next played first-class cricket in 1960, when the team made its Ranji Trophy debut against Jammu and Kashmir. The team continued to appear in the Ranji Trophy until the 1967/68 season, when it played its final first-class match against Southern Punjab. In 1968–69 Southern Punjab and Northern Punjab combined to form an undivided Punjab team.

== See also ==
- Southern Punjab cricket team
- Patiala cricket team
- Eastern Punjab cricket team
