= Chandu Sarwate =

Indian cricket player (1920–2003)

Personal information
- Full name: Chandrasekhar Trimbak Sarwate
- Born: July 22, 1920; Sagar, Central Provinces, British India
- Died: 22 December 2003 (aged 83); Indore, Madhya Pradesh, India
- Batting: Right-handed
- Bowling: Right-arm off-break; Leg-break

International information
- National side: India (1946–1951)
- Test debut (cap 34): 20 July 1946 v England
- Last Test: 14 December 1951 v England

Domestic team information
- Years: Team
- 1936: Central Provinces and Berar
- 1940–1943: Maharashtra
- 1941–1944: Hindus
- 1943: Bombay
- 1944–1958: Holkar
- 1955–1956: Madhya Bharat
- 1958–1968: Madhya Pradesh
- 1968: Vidarbha

Career statistics
Competition	Test	First-class
Matches	9	171
Runs scored	208	7,430
Batting average	13.00	32.73
100s/50s	0/0	14/38
Top score	37	246
Balls bowled	658	27,533
Wickets	3	494
Bowling average	124.66	23.54
5 wickets in innings	0	26
10 wickets in match	0	3
Best bowling	1/16	9/61
Catches/stumpings	0/–	91/–
- Source: ESPNcricinfo

Chandrasekhar Trimbak Sarwate (22 July 1920 – 22 December 2003) was an Indian cricketer and fingerprint expert. He was an all-rounder who played nine Test matches for India between 1946 and 1951 with no success — his Test batting average was only 13.00, and his Test bowling average was 124.66. He bowled slow leg breaks.

== Career ==
Sarwate had a long career in first-class cricket, spanning 32 years, during which he represented Central Provinces and Berar, Maharashtra, Hindus, Bombay, Holkar, Madhya Pradesh and Vidarbha.

Sarwate's most famous innings as a batsman came while playing for the touring Indian side against Surrey at the Oval in May 1946. Coming in to bat after his team was down 205/9, Shute Banerjee and he put on 249 for the last wicket, more runs than the first nine wickets put together. Both players went on to score centuries, and as of 2018, it remains the only such instance in first-class cricket. Their 249-run stand remains the highest partnership in first-class cricket between number ten and eleven batsmen. Sarwate remained unbeaten at 124. He returned figures of 5/54 with the ball before opening the second innings for the Indians. They went on to win the match by nine wickets.

Sarwate's highest first-class score was 246 for Holkar against Bengal in 1951, and his best bowling in an innings was 9 for 61 for Holkar against Mysore in 1946. His overall batting average in first-class cricket was 32.73, and his bowling average was 23.54.

Sarwate was a national selector for three years in the early 1980s, and was one of the selectors who picked the Indian team that won the World Cup in England in 1983. Besides being the secretary of Madhya Pradesh Cricket Association, he was also the chairman of its selection committee on number of occasions. Sarwate held degrees in arts and law and was a fingerprint expert by profession.
