= Central Provinces and Berar cricket team =

Historical Indian cricket team

Team information
- Founded: 1933
- Last match: 1949

History
- First-class debut: Ceylon in 1933 at Central Provinces Gymkhana Ground, Nagpur
- Ranji Trophy wins: 0

The Central Provinces and Berar cricket team represented the Indian province and state of Central Provinces and Berar in the Ranji Trophy from 1934–35 to 1949–50. After the state was dissolved and redistributed into several states in 1950, the Central Provinces and Berar team was superseded by the Madhya Pradesh team, beginning with the 1950–51 Ranji Trophy, and the Vidarbha team, beginning with the 1957–58 Ranji Trophy.

== Playing record ==
Central Provinces and Berar played 15 first-class matches between 1933 and 1949, including 11 Ranji Trophy matches. They won only one of their Ranji Trophy matches, against Mysore in 1947–48 under the captaincy of Wasuderao Sane, lost nine and drew one. They won one of their other matches, against Cricket Club of India in 1938–39, and lost the other three.

== Leading players ==
Central Provinces and Berar batsmen scored two centuries. C. K. Nayudu scored 107 against Marylebone Cricket Club in 1933–34, and Kamraj Kesari scored 142 against Holkar in the Ranji Trophy in 1948–49. In the same match, Kesari recorded Central Provinces and Berar's best Ranji Trophy bowling figures, 6 for 62. The best bowling figures overall were 7 for 43 by C. S. Nayudu against Cricket Club of India in 1938–39.

== Grounds ==
Central Provinces and Berar played all their home matches at the Central Provinces Gymkhana Ground in Nagpur. Vidarbha later used the ground for their home matches, and it also staged nine Test matches between 1969 and 2006.
