= Eastern Punjab cricket team =

Team information
- Founded: 1950
- Last match: 1960

History
- First-class debut: Services in 1950 at Gandhi Sports Complex Ground, Amritsar
- Ranji Trophy wins: 0

The Eastern Punjab cricket team was an Indian domestic cricket team representing the eastern part of the Indian state of Punjab. It played 22 first-class matches, all in the Ranji Trophy, between 1950 and 1960, winning 2, losing 13 and drawing 7. It played its home matches in Amritsar and Jalandhar.

The highest individual score was 145 by Swaranjit Singh, who hit two of the team's four centuries. Swaranjit Singh's 145 contributed to Eastern Punjab's highest team total of 380. The lowest team total was 31, against Railways in 1958–59.

The best innings bowling figures were 6 for 35 by William Ghosh. The best match figures were 9 for 48 (5 for 15 and 4 for 33) by Som Prakash in Jammu and Kashmir's inaugural first-class match in January 1960. That match, which Eastern Punjab won by an innings, was the only one in which they dismissed their opponents twice.

After the team disbanded, many of the players joined Southern Punjab or Northern Punjab, which both competed in the Ranji Trophy from 1960 to 1961 and 1967–68. For the 1968–69 season they combined to form an undivided Punjab team.

== See also ==
- Southern Punjab cricket team
- Patiala cricket team
- Northern Punjab cricket team
