= Baroda cricket team =

Indian cricket team

Personnel
- Captain: Krunal Pandya
- Coach: Jacob Martin
- Owner: Baroda Cricket Association

Team information
- Founded: 1886
- Home ground: Baroda Cricket Association Stadium
- Capacity: 40,000

History
- First-class debut: Nawanagar in 1937 at Ajitsinhji Ground, Jamnagar
- Ranji Trophy wins: 5
- Irani Trophy wins: 0
- Vijay Hazare Trophy wins: 0
- Syed Mushtaq Ali Trophy wins: 2
- Official website: BCA

The Baroda cricket team is a domestic cricket team based in the city of Vadodara, Gujarat. The home ground of the team is the Baroda Cricket Association Stadium. It is one of the three first-class cricket teams based in the Indian state of Gujarat (the other two being the Saurashtra cricket team and the Gujarat cricket team).

The team is run by the Baroda Cricket Association. It has been one of the most successful teams in the Ranji Trophy in the new millennium. Baroda were runners-up in the 2005/06 Ranji Trophy.

== Competition history ==
Baroda has only emerged as a strong team in recent years. It won its last Ranji Trophy in 2000–01, but failed to defend the title, coming runner-up in the next year. This means it has had only one Irani Trophy appearance, in which it failed to defeat a strong Rest of India team which contained the likes of VVS Laxman (13 & 148), Dinesh Mongia (125 & 90*), Debashish Mohanty, Sarandeep Singh and Akash Chopra. See Scorecard. It was considered a strong team in the 1940s and 1950s, winning 4 times and coming runner-up twice. Vijay Hazare, Irfan Pathan, Yusuf Pathan, Hardik Pandya are amongst the most prominent cricketers to emerge from Baroda. They have performed exceedingly well at the international level for India.

== Honours ==
- Ranji Trophy
  - Winners (5): 1942–43, 1946–47, 1949–50, 1957–58, 2000–01
  - Runners-up (4): 1945–46, 1948–49, 2001–02, 2010–11
- Syed Mushtaq Ali Trophy
  - Winners (2): 2011-12, 2013-14
  - Runners-up (3): 2015-16, 2021-21, 2023-24

== Home grounds ==
- Baroda Cricket Association Stadium – Capacity 40,000.
- Moti Bagh Stadium, Vadodara – Hosted three ODIs. Capacity 18,000.
- Reliance Stadium, Vadodara – Hosted 10 ODIs.
- Gujarat State Fertilizer Corporation Ground

== Current squad ==
Players with international caps are listed in bold.

Name	Birth date	Batting style	Bowling style	Notes
Batters
Vishnu Solanki	15 October 1992 (age 34)	Right-handed	Right-arm off break	
Shashwat Rawat	6 April 2001 (age 25)	Left-handed	Right-arm medium	
Shivalik Sharma	28 November 1998 (age 27)	Left-handed	Right-arm leg break	
Bhanu Pania	4 September 1996 (age 30)	Right-handed	Right-arm medium	
Priyanshu Moliya	17 June 2005 (age 21)	Right-handed	Right-arm off break	
Nitya Pandya	8 April 2006 (age 20)	Left-handed	Right-arm medium	
**Deepak Hooda**	19 April 1995 (age 31)	Right-handed	Right-arm off break	
Dhruv Patel	3 January 2003 (age 23)	Right-handed	Left-arm medium	
Manan Solanki	14 August 2001 (age 25)	Right-handed	Right-arm leg break	
All-rounders
**Krunal Pandya**	24 March 1991 (age 35)	Left-handed	Slow left-arm orthodox	**Captain**; Plays for **Royal Challengers Bengaluru** in IPL
**Hardik Pandya**	11 October 1993 (age 33)	Right-handed	Right-arm medium-fast	Plays for **Punjab Kings** in IPL
Wicket-keepers
Mitesh Patel	15 May 1997 (age 29)	Right-handed		
**Jitesh Sharma**	22 October 1993 (age 33)	Right-handed		Plays for **Royal Challengers Bengaluru** in IPL
Amit Pasi	27 August 1999 (age 27)	Right-handed		
Spin Bowlers
Mahesh Pithiya	24 December 2001 (age 24)	Right-handed	Right-arm off break	
Bhargav Bhatt	13 May 1990 (age 36)	Left-handed	Slow left-arm orthodox	
Aryan Chavda	4 July 2002 (age 24)	Right-handed	Slow left-arm orthodox	
Hemant Punde	9 March 1998 (age 28)	Left-handed	Slow left-arm orthodox	
Pace Bowlers
Atit Sheth	3 February 1996 (age 30)	Right-handed	Right-arm medium	**Vice-captain**
Rasikh Salam Dar	5 April 2000 (age 26)	Right-handed	Right-arm fast-medium	Plays for **Royal Challengers Bengaluru** in IPL
Raj Limbani	2 February 2005 (age 21)	Left-handed	Right-arm medium	
Karan Umatt	21 June 2004 (age 22)	Right-handed	Right-arm medium	
Safvan Patel	3 October 1998 (age 28)	Right-handed	Left-arm medium	

Updated as on 16 November 2026

== Coaching staff ==
- Head coach – Jacob Martin
- Team Mentor & Pace Bowling Coach – Munaf Patel
- Assistant coach – Himanshu Jadhav
- Physio – Sumit Roy
- Trainers – Rakesh Gohil

== Famous players ==
- Hemu Adhikari
- Anshuman Gaekwad
- Datta Gaekwad
- Jayasinghrao Ghorpade
- Vijay Hazare
- Nayan Mongia
- Rashid Patel
- Kiran More
- C. S. Nayudu
- Yusuf Pathan
- Irfan Pathan
- Munaf Patel
- Zaheer Khan
- Hardik Pandya
- Krunal Pandya
- Ambati Rayudu
- Pinal Shah
- Atul Bedade
