= Southern Punjab cricket team (India) =

Domestic cricket team in British India

Team information
- Founded: 1926
- Last match: 1967

History
- First-class debut: Marylebone Cricket Club in 1926 at Lawrence Gardens, Lahore
- Ranji Trophy wins: 0

The Southern Punjab cricket team was an Indian domestic team representing the southern part of the Indian province of Punjab during the British Raj and later the southern part of its Indian successor, following the partition of India. It played 74 matches at first-class level between 1926–27 and 1967–68.

== History ==
The team first played first-class cricket in November 1926 against a touring Marylebone Cricket Club team. Southern Punjab was one of the teams that competed in the inaugural season of the Ranji Trophy in 1934–35, and it continued to contest the Ranji Trophy until 1951–52. It returned in 1959–60 and continued until 1967–68, after which it combined with Northern Punjab to form Punjab. Its final first-class match was a draw against Northern Punjab in December 1967.

Southern Punjab's highest finish in the Ranji Trophy came in 1938–39 when it lost to Bombay in the final; the captain, S. Wazir Ali, scored 222 not out in Southern Punjab's first innings of 328. Most of Southern Punjab's home games were played at the Baradari Ground (now known as Dhruve Pandove Stadium) in Patiala.

== Honours ==
- Ranji Trophy
  - Runners-up (1): 1938–39

== See also ==
- Patiala cricket team
- Eastern Punjab cricket team
- Northern Punjab cricket team
