= List of Rajasthan cricketers =

This is a list of cricketers who have played first-class, List A or Twenty20 cricket for Rajasthan cricket team. Seasons given are first and last seasons; the player did not necessarily play in all the intervening seasons. Players in bold have played international cricket.

== A ==
- **Arvind Apte**, 1968/69-1970/71
- Azeem Akhtar, 2013/14-2014/15
- **Pravin Amre**
- Pramod Arya, 1975/76-1981/82
- **Aditya Narendra Garhwal 2014–present**

== B ==
- Asgar Baig, 1991/92-1992/93
- Jitendra Bhatnagar, 1963/64-1969/70
- Rajat Bhatia
- Rajesh Bishnoi, 2006/07-2016/17
- Rajesh Bishnoi, 2016/17
- Chetan Bist
- Robin Bist, 2007/08-2014/15
- RAHUL Yogi,

== C ==
- Deepak Chahar, 2010/11-2016/17
- Rahul Chahar, 2016/17
- Raman Chahar, 2010/11-2012/13
- **Aakash Chopra**, 2010/11-2011/12
- Aniket Choudhary, 2011–2013
- Kishan Choudhary, 2000/01-2009/10

== D ==
- Anup Dave, 1998/99-2005/06
- Kaushal Dewara, 1997/98-2004/05
- Nikhil Doru
- **Salim Durani**, 1956/57-1977/78

== G ==
- Kailash Gattani, 1962/63-1982/83
- Amitkumar Gautam
- Arjit Gupta, 2009/10-2015/16
- Naresh Gehlot, 2003/04-2013/14
- Shailender Gehlot, 2002/03-2014/15
- **Subhash Gupte**, 1960/61-1962/63

== H ==
- Divya Pratap Singh Hada, 2013/14
- Tanveer-Ul-Haq
- Nazmul Hussain, 1968/69-1979/80

== I ==
- Mohammad Ilyas, 1991/92

== J ==
- **Ajay Jadeja**, 2005/06-2006/07
- Anshu Jain, 1996/97-2010/11
- Deepak Jain, 1985/86-1994/95
- Rohit Jhalani, 1997/98-2011/12
- Sohan Jain 1985/86

== K ==
- **Hrishikesh Kanitkar**, 2010/11-2013/14
- Afroz Khan, 2003/04-2011
- S. F. Khan
- Madhur Khatri, 2009/10-2015/16
- Sumit Khatri, 2006/07-2010/11
- **Gagan Khoda**
- P. Krishnakumar

== L ==
- Ankit Lamba, 2009/10-2015/16
- Mahipal Lomror, 2016/17

- Sumit Mathur, 2002/03-20
- Manu Tiwari, 2005/02-26
- Yogesh Mathur, 1988/07-12
- Ashok Menaria, 2008/09-06
- MANRAJ SINGH, 2016/01-09

== N ==
- Arjun Naidu, 1957/58-1961/62
- Amar Negi, 1986/87-1988/89
- Naveen Negi, 1996/97-1997/98
- B. B. Nimbalkar, 1956/57-1957/58

== O ==
- Sanjee Ohlan, 1996/97

== P ==
- Rashmi Parida, 2010/11-2012/13
- Prakash Poddar, 1964/65-1966/67
- Vikas Purohit, 1990/91-1991/92

== R ==
- L. Rathore, 1983/84
- Rajiv Rathore, 1985/86-1995/96
- Kishan Rungta, 1956/57-1969/70
- Rajendrakumar Rungta, 1962/63-1965/66
- Ravi Vishnoi Birami, jodhpur, Rajasthan

== S ==
- Vineet Saxena
- Mahesh Sharma, 1973/74-1976/77
- Pranay Sharma
- Rohit Sharma, 2004/05-2009/10
- Chandrapal Singh, 2013/14-2015/16
- Devendra Pal Singh, 1993/94-2003/04
- Gajendra Singh Shaktawat 1970/71-1980/81
- Gajendra Singh
- **Hanumant Singh**, 1957/58-1978/79
- Kukna Ajay Singh
- Manender Singh
- Nathu Singh
- **Pankaj Singh**, 2004/05-2016/17
- Rituraj Singh

== T ==
- Ashok Tipnis, 1955/56
- Rajnikant Trivedi, 1963/64-1964/65

== V ==
- Dilip Verma, 1976/77
- Shubhanshu Vijay, 2005/06-2008/09
- Sanajay Vyas, 1979/80-1989/90

W

- Mohammed Wasid, 1998/99-1999/00

Y

- Pramod Yadav, 1996/97-2000/01
- Puneet Yadav, 2010/11-2016/17
- Vijendra Yadav, 1990/91-1997/98
- Vikrant Yadav, 2002/03-2011/12
- Vivek Yadav, 2010/11
- Dishant Yagnik, 2002/03-2015/16
- Yanish Rathore. 2017/4- 2022/6

== Z ==
- S. K. Zibbu, 1951/52-1962/63
