= 1973–74 Ranji Trophy =

Cricket Championship Season

1973-74 Ranji Trophy
- The Ranji Trophy, which the winners get.
- Administrator: BCCI
- Cricket format: First-class cricket
- Tournament format(s): League and knockout
- Champions: Karnataka (1st title)
- Participants: 24
- Most runs: Hemant Kanitkar (Maharashtra) (629)
- Most wickets: B. S. Chandrasekhar (Karnataka) (55)

The 1973–74 Ranji Trophy was the 40th season of the Ranji Trophy. Karnataka ended Bombay's sequence of 15 consecutive titles by defeating them on first innings in the semifinal. They defeated Rajasthan by 185 runs in the final to win their first Ranji Trophy.

== Group stage ==
=== South Zone ===
Team	Pld	W	L	D	T	NR	Pts	Q
Hyderabad	4	2	0	2	0	0	26	2.332
Karnataka	4	2	0	2	0	0	26	1.948
Tamil Nadu	4	2	0	2	0	0	24	1.699
Andhra	4	0	3	1	0	0	5	0.533
Kerala	4	0	3	1	0	0	3	0.295

=== North Zone ===
Team	Pld	W	L	D	T	NR	Pts	Q
Delhi	5	4	0	1	0	0	38	2.264
Railways	5	2	1	2	0	0	26	1.219
Haryana	5	1	1	3	0	0	24	1.088
Services	5	1	2	2	0	0	16	0.829
Punjab	5	0	0	5	0	0	15	0.900
Jammu and Kashmir	5	0	4	1	0	0	5	0.386

=== East Zone ===
Team	Pld	W	L	D	T	NR	Pts	Q
Bengal	3	2	0	1	0	0	20	2.535
Bihar	3	2	0	1	0	0	19	1.540
Orissa	3	0	2	1	0	0	5	0.660
Assam	3	0	2	1	0	0	3	0.453

=== West Zone ===
Team	Pld	W	L	D	T	NR	Pts	Q
Bombay	4	2	0	2	0	0	27	2.390
Maharashtra	4	1	0	3	0	0	20	1.297
Gujarat	4	1	0	3	0	0	18	0.959
Baroda	4	0	1	3	0	0	13	0.741
Saurashtra	4	0	3	1	0	0	3	0.549

=== Central Zone ===
Team	Pld	W	L	D	T	NR	Pts	Q
Rajasthan	3	1	0	2	0	0	14	0.874
Uttar Pradesh	3	1	1	1	0	0	13	1.413
Madhya Pradesh	3	1	1	1	0	0	13	1.015
Vidarbha	3	0	1	2	0	0	8	0.813

== Knockout stage ==
Pre-Quarter-finals
22 Feb 1974 — Calcutta
Bengal	143 & 161/3
Maharashtra	197 & 199
22 Feb 1974 — Jamshedpur
Bihar	105 & 334/6d
Uttar Pradesh	169 & 171

Quarter-finals
01 Mar 1974 — Hyderabad
Hyderabad	493
Maharashtra	254 & 429/9
01 Mar 1974 — Delhi
Railways	246 & 127/4
Rajasthan	255 & 281
01 Mar 1974 — Bangalore
Karnataka	338 & 265
Delhi	206 & 174
01 Mar 1974 — Jamshedpur
Bihar	302 & 122
Bombay	200 & 283

Semi-finals
15 Mar 1974 — Hyderabad
Hyderabad	276 & 155
Rajasthan	196 & 247
15 Mar 1974 — Bangalore
Karnataka	385 & 279/8d
Bombay	207 & 84/0

Finals
23 Mar 1974 — Jaipur
Rajasthan	176 & 127
Karnataka	276 & 212

=== Semi-finals ===
15–18 March 1974
1st Semi-final
Scorecard

Rajasthan	v	Hyderabad (H)
196 (82.2 overs); Parthasarathy Sharma 86; Naushir Mehta 6/74 (29.2 overs)		276 (94.1 overs); Abdul Hai 135; Suresh Shastri 4/55 (21 overs)
247 (100.1 overs); Nazmul Hussain 72; MV Narasimha Rao 5/24 (14.1 overs)		155 (67.3 overs); Mumtaz Hussain 32; Gajendra Singh Shaktawat 6/34 (20.3 overs)

Rajasthan won by 12 runs
Lal Bahadur Shastri Stadium, Hyderabad
Umpires: Ahmed Mamsa and Ram Punjabi

- Sunil Benjamin (Rajasthan) passed 1,000 runs and Abbas Ali Baig (Hyderabad) passed 12,000 runs in first-class cricket.
- ML Jaisimha (Hyderabad) reached 400 wickets in first-class cricket.

15–18 March 1974
2nd Semi-final
Scorecard

Karnataka	v	Bombay
385 (152 overs); Gundappa Viswanath 162; Padmakar Shivalkar 4/94 (43 overs)		307 (135 overs); Ashok Mankad 84; EAS Prasanna 5/117 (63 overs)
279/9d (107.1 overs); Brijesh Patel 63; Rakesh Tandon 4/114 (42 overs)		84/0 (34 overs); Ramnath Parkar 49*; Gundappa Viswanath 0/7 (2 overs)

Match drawn (Karnataka won on first innings)
M. Chinnaswamy Stadium, Bangalore
Umpires: Sunil Banerjee and Bhairab Ganguli

- Karnataka won the toss and elected to bat.
- Brijesh Patel (Karnataka) passed 2,000 runs in first-class cricket.
- Padmakar Shivalkar (Bombay) reached 300 wickets in first-class cricket.

=== Final ===
23–27 March 1974
Scorecard

Karnataka	v	Rajasthan (H)
276 (101.3 overs); B. Vijayakrishna 71; Chandrasekhar Joshi 3/53 (19 overs)		176 (89.1 overs); Hanumant Singh 83; V. S. Vijay Kumar 4/9 (7.1 overs)
212 (85 overs); A. V. Jayaprakash 64*; Kailash Gattani 4/41 (19 overs)		127 (50.3 overs); Parthasarathy Sharma 51; EAS Prasanna 5/45 (21 overs)

Karnataka won by 185 runs
Sawai Mansingh Stadium, Jaipur
Umpires: Madhav Gothoskar and Judah Reuben

- Karnataka won the toss and elected to bat.

== Scorecards and averages ==
- CricketArchive
- Knockout Matches (no pay wall)
- ESPNCricinfo (no pay wall)
