= 2017–18 Syed Mushtaq Ali Trophy =

Indian cricket tournament

- Dates: 21 – 26 January 2018
- Administrator(s): BCCI
- Cricket format: T20
- Tournament format(s): Round robin, then knockout
- Champions: Delhi (1st title)
- Participants: 28
- Matches: 86
- Most runs: Kedar Devdhar (Baroda) (411)
- Most wickets: Deepak Chahar (Rajasthan) (19)
- Official website: bcci.tv

The 2017–18 Syed Mushtaq Ali Trophy was the tenth edition of the Syed Mushtaq Ali Trophy, an annual Twenty20 tournament in India. Played from 21 to 26 January 2018, it was contested by all 28 Ranji Trophy teams and won by Delhi, their first title. In this edition, the tournament was restored to its original state team format, replacing the one-off zone format used in the 2016–17 edition of the championship.

== Group stage ==
=== West Zone ===
Team	Pld	W	L	T	NR	Pts	NRR
Baroda	4	4	0	0	0	16	1.218
Mumbai	4	2	2	0	0	8	0.803
Saurashtra	4	2	2	0	0	8	-0.222
Gujarat	4	1	3	0	0	4	-0.405
Maharashtra	4	1	3	0	0	4	-1.270

=== Central Zone ===
Team	Pld	W	L	T	NR	Pts	NRR
Rajasthan	5	4	1	0	0	16	0.716
Uttar Pradesh	5	3	2	0	0	12	0.585
Vidarbha	5	3	2	0	0	12	0.505
Madhya Pradesh	5	3	2	0	0	12	0.112
Railways	5	1	4	0	0	4	-0.790
Chhattisgarh	5	1	4	0	0	4	-1.237

=== South Zone ===
Team	Pld	W	L	T	NR	Pts	NRR
Karnataka	5	4	1	0	0	16	1.354
Tamil Nadu	5	4	1	0	0	16	0.435
Andhra	5	4	1	0	0	16	0.109
Hyderabad	5	2	3	0	0	8	-0.074
Kerala	5	1	4	0	0	4	-0.375
Goa	5	0	5	0	0	0	-1.499

=== East Zone ===
Team	Pld	W	L	T	NR	Pts	NRR
Bengal	4	4	0	0	0	16	0.863
Jharkhand	4	3	1	0	0	12	1.080
Orissa	4	2	2	0	0	8	1.085
Tripura	4	1	3	0	0	4	-1.326
Assam	4	0	4	0	0	0	-1.484

=== North Zone ===
Team	Pld	W	L	T	NR	Pts	NRR
Delhi	5	4	1	0	0	16	2.267
Punjab	5	3	2	0	0	12	-0.140
Services	5	2	3	0	0	8	0.121
Haryana	5	2	3	0	0	8	-0.200
Himachal Pradesh	5	2	3	0	0	8	-0.804
Jammu and Kashmir	5	2	3	0	0	8	-0.838

== Super League ==
=== Group A ===
==== Points table ====
Team	Pld	W	L	T	NR	Pts	NRR
Rajasthan	4	3	1	0	0	12	0.519
Punjab	4	3	1	0	0	12	0.080
Karnataka	4	2	2	0	0	8	1.418
Mumbai	4	1	3	0	0	4	-0.302
Jharkhand	4	1	3	0	0	4	-1.747

==== Fixtures ====
21 January 2017
08:45
Scorecard

Karnataka; 158/7 (20 overs)	v	Punjab; 158/9 (20 overs)
Aniruddha Joshi 40 (19); Manpreet Gony 2/8 (4 overs)		Mandeep Singh 45 (29); Sreenath Aravind 4/32 (4 overs)

Match tied
(Punjab won the one-over eliminator)
Jadavpur University Campus Ground, Kolkata
Umpires: Subrat Das and Rohan Pandit

- Punjab won the toss and elected to field.
- Prasidh Krishna (Karnataka) made his T20 debut. Super-over: Punjab 15/0, Karnataka 11/0

21 January 2017
12:45
Scorecard

Mumbai; 170/5 (20 overs)	v	Jharkhand; 157/7 (20 overs)
Siddhesh Lad 46 (33); Shahbaz Nadeem 1/23 (4 overs)		Virat Singh 81 (49); Akash Parkar 2/32 (4 overs)

Mumbai won by 13 runs
Jadavpur University Campus Ground, Kolkata
Umpires: Navdeep Singh and Virender Sharma

- Jharkhand won the toss and elected to field.

22 January 2017
08:45
Scorecard

Jharkhand; 157/5 (20 overs)	v	Rajasthan; 158/6 (19.1 overs)
Virat Singh 43 (28); Aditya Garhwal 3/15 (3 overs)		Salman Khan 34 (23); Shahbaz Nadeem 1/18 (4 overs)

Rajasthan won by 4 wickets
Jadavpur University Campus Ground, Kolkata
Umpires: Navdeep Singh and Rohan Pandit

- Rajasthan won the toss and elected to field.

22 January 2017
12:45
Scorecard

Mumbai; 198/4 (20 Overs)	v	Punjab; 199/7 (19.2 Overs)
Shreyas Iyer 79* (44); Mayank Markande 2/32 (4 overs)		Gurkeerat Singh 43 (18); Shivam Dube 3/27 (3.3 overs)

Punjab won by 3 wickets
Jadavpur University Campus Ground, Kolkata
Umpires: Subrat Das and Nand Kishore

- Punjab won the toss and elected to field.

23 January 2017
08:45
Scorecard

Rajasthan; 160/8 (20 Overs)	v	Karnataka; 138 (20 Overs)
Ankit Lamba 58 (47); Sreenath Aravind 3/25 (4 Overs)		Aniruddha Joshi 73* (45); Deepak Chahar 5/15 (4 Overs)

Rajasthan won by 22 runs
Jadavpur University Campus Ground, Kolkata
Umpires: Subrat Das and Nitin Pandit

- Karnataka won the toss and elected to field.

23 January 2017
17:00 (D/N)
Scorecard

Punjab; 149/7 (20 overs)	v	Jharkhand; 150/6 (19.3 overs)
Mandeep Singh 48 (35); Kaushal Singh 3/26 (4 overs)		Ishan Kishan 54 (29); Barinder Sran 2/19 (4 overs)

Jharkhand won by 4 wickets
Eden Gardens, Kolkata
Umpires: Nand Kishore and Nitin Pandit

- Punjab won the toss and elected to bat.

24 January 2017
13:00
Scorecard

Rajasthan; 175/6 (20 Overs)	v	Mumbai; 158/8 (20 Overs)
Mahipal Lomror 74 (55); Dhawal Kulkarni 3/35 (4 overs)		Suryakumar Yadav 39 (23); Deepak Chahar 3/27 (4 overs)

Rajasthan won by 17 runs
Eden Gardens, Kolkata
Umpires: Navdeep Singh and Virender Sharma

- Rajasthan won the toss and elected to bat.
- Royston Dias (Mumbai) made his T20 debut.

24 January 2017
17:00 (D/N)
Scorecard

Karnataka; 201/4 (20 overs)	v	Jharkhand; 78 (14.2 overs)
Karun Nair 100 (52); Monu Kumar 2/31 (4 overs)		Vikash Singh 25 (16); Sreenath Aravind 2/6 (2 overs)

Karnataka won by 123 runs
Eden Gardens, Kolkata
Umpires: Anil Dandekar and Abhijit Deshmukh

- Jharkhand won the toss and elected to field.
- BR Sharath (Karnataka) made his T20 debut.

25 January 2017
13:00
Scorecard

Punjab; 129/9 (20 overs)	v	Rajasthan; 124/8 (20 overs)
Harbhajan Singh 32 (31); Khaleel Ahmed 3/17 (4 overs)		Ankit Lamba 47 (37); Barinder Sran 3/22 (4 overs)

Punjab won by 5 runs
Eden Gardens, Kolkata
Umpires: Yeshwant Barde and Nand Kishore

- Rajasthan won the toss and elected to field.

25 January 2017
17:00 (D/N)
Scorecard

Mumbai; 175/8 (20 Overs)	v	Karnataka; 176/3 (18.4 Overs)
Suryakumar Yadav 59* (28); Stuart Binny 3/36 (4 overs)		Mayank Agarwal 77 (41); Shashank Singh 0/21 (4 Overs)

Karnataka won by 7 wickets
Eden Gardens, Kolkata
Umpires: Navdeep Singh and Virender Sharma

- Mumbai won the toss and elected to bat.

=== Group B ===
==== Points table ====
Team	Pld	W	L	T	NR	Pts	NRR
Delhi	4	3	1	0	0	12	0.600
Uttar Pradesh	4	2	2	0	0	8	1.011
Baroda	4	2	2	0	0	8	0.234
Bengal	4	2	2	0	0	8	-0.692
Tamil Nadu	4	1	3	0	0	4	-1.178

==== Fixtures ====
21 January 2017
13:00
Scorecard

Tamil Nadu; 145/7 (20 overs)	v	Delhi; 146/2 (15.2 overs)
Vijay Shankar 57* (48); Kulwant Khejroliya 4/26 (4 overs)		Rishabh Pant 58 (33); Washington Sundar 2/32 (4 overs)

Delhi won by 8 wickets
Eden Gardens, Kolkata
Umpires: Anil Dandekar and Nitin Pandit

- Delhi won the toss and elected to field
- Ganga Sridhar Raju (Tamil Nadu) made his T20 debut.

21 January 2017
17:00 (D/N)
Scorecard

Baroda; 149/9 (20 overs)	v	Bengal; 132 (19.5 overs)
Vishnu Solanki 26 (31); Mukesh Kumar 1/16 (4 overs)		Shreevats Goswami 58 (43); Krunal Pandya 3/14 (4 overs)

Baroda won by 17 runs
Eden Gardens, Kolkata
Umpires: Yeshwant Barde and Abhijit Deshmukh

- Baroda won the toss and elected to bat
- Ninad Rathva (Baroda) made his T20 debut.

22 January 2017
13:00
Scorecard

Uttar Pradesh; 235/3 (20 overs)	v	Bengal; 160 (16.1 overs)
Suresh Raina 126* (59); Ashok Dinda 1/29 (4 overs)		Shreevats Goswami 57 (28); Kuldeep Yadav 4/26 (4 overs)

Uttar Pradesh won by 75 runs
Eden Gardens, Kolkata
Umpires: Anil Dandekar and Virender Sharma

- Uttar Pradesh won the toss and elected to bat
- Pradipta Pramanik (Bengal) made his T20 debut

22 January 2017
17:00 (D/N)
Scorecard

Baroda; 140/8 (20 overs)	v	Delhi; 143/8 (19.1 overs)
Kedar Devdhar 77 (53); Suboth Bhati 4/20 (4 overs)		Dhruv Shorey 74 (56); Lukman Meriwala 4/24 (4 overs)

Delhi won by 2 wickets
Eden Gardens, Kolkata
Umpires: Yeshwant Barde and Abhijit Deshmukh

- Delhi won the toss and elected to field
- Dhruv Patel (Baroda) made his T20 debut

23 January 2017
12:45
Scorecard

Bengal; 170/6 (20 overs)	v	Delhi; 167/8 (20 overs)
Sudip Chatterjee 51 (34); Sayan Ghosh 3/24 (4 overs)		Dhruv Shorey 84 (46); Pradeep Sangwan 2/27 (4 overs)

Bengal won by 3 runs
Jadavpur University Campus Ground, Kolkata
Umpires: Abhijit Deshmukh and Anil Dandekar

- Bengal won the toss and elected to bat

23 January 2017
13:00
Scorecard

Uttar Pradesh; 162/4 (20 overs)	v	Tamil Nadu; 163/5 (19.2 overs)
Suresh Raina 61 (41); Athisayaraj Davidson 0/29 (4 overs)		Sanjay Yadav 52 (32); Praveen Kumar 1/16 (3.2 overs)

Tamil Nadu won by 5 wickets
Eden Gardens, Kolkata
Umpires: Anil Dandekar and Virender Sharma

- Uttar Pradesh won the toss and elected to bat

24 January 2017
08:45
Scorecard

Baroda; 192/3 (20 overs)	v	Uttar Pradesh; 195/3 (18.4 overs)
Urvil Patel 96 (54); Mohsin Khan 2/38 (4 overs)		Umang Sharma 95 (47); Krunal Pandya 1/25 (3 overs)

Uttar Pradesh won by 7 wickets
Jadavpur University Campus Ground, Kolkata
Umpires: Nand Kishore and Subrat Das

- Uttar Pradesh won the toss and elected to field

24 January 2017
12:45
Scorecard

Tamil Nadu; 129/9 (20 overs)	v	Bengal; 134/3 (16.2 overs)
Anirudha Srikkanth 37 (26); Kanishk Seth 3/26 (4 overs)		Sudip Chatterjee 51* (47); Athisayaraj Davidson 1/16 (2 overs)

Bengal won by 7 wickets
Jadavpur University Campus Ground, Kolkata
Umpires: Nitin Pandit and Rohan Pandit

- Tamil Nadu won the toss and elected to bat

25 January 2017
08:45
Scorecard

Delhi; 140/9 (20 overs)	v	Uttar Pradesh; 137 (20 overs)
Rishabh Pant 58 (34); Mohd Israr 2/12 (3 overs)		Rinku Singh 34 (26); Pawan Negi 2/13 (2 overs)

Delhi won by 3 runs
Jadavpur University Campus Ground, Kolkata
Umpires: Anil Dandekar and Subrat Das

- Uttar Pradesh won the toss and elected to field

25 January 2017
12:45
Scorecard

Tamil Nadu; 123/7 (20 overs)	v	Baroda; 125/5 (17.1 overs)
Anirudha Srikkanth 32 (20); Rishi Arothe 1/11 (3 overs)		Kedar Devdhar 68 (55); Athisayaraj Davidson 1/18 (3 overs)

Baroda won by 5 wickets
Jadavpur University Campus Ground, Kolkata
Umpires: Nitin Pandit and Subrat Das

- Tamil Nadu won the toss and elected to bat
- Ramalingam Rohit (Tamil Nadu) made his T20 debut.

== Final ==
26 January 2018
17:00
Scorecard

Delhi; 153/6 (20 Overs)	v	Rajasthan; 112 (19.1 Overs)
Unmukt Chand 53 (49); Khaleel Ahmed 2/23 (4 Overs)		Aditya Garhwal 52 (36); Pradeep Sangwan 2/14 (4 Overs)

Delhi won by 41 runs
Eden Gardens, Kolkata
Umpires: Yeshwant Barde and Anil Dandekar
Player of the match: Pradeep Sangwan (Delhi)

- Delhi won Syed Mushtaq Ali Trophy for the first time.
