= List of Rajasthan first-class cricket records =

This is a List of Rajasthan first-class cricket records, with each list containing the top five performances in the category.

Currently active players are in bold.

== Team records ==
=== Highest innings totals ===
Rank	Score	Opponent	Season
1	641/7 dec	Maharashtra	2010/11
2	621	Tamil Nadu	1988/89
3	615	Vidarbha	1945/46
4	604	Maharashtra	1990/91
5	594/8 dec	Madhya Bharat	1948/49
Source: CricketArchive. Last updated: 16 October 2016.

=== Lowest innings totals ===
Rank	Score	Opponent	Season
1	51	Orissa	2015/16
2	63	Madhya Pradesh	1988/89
3	66	Madhya Pradesh	1976/77
4	74	Haryana	2014/15
5	78	Vidarbha	1981/82
Source: CricketArchive. Last updated: 16 October 2016.

== Batting records ==
=== Highest individual scores ===
Rank	Score	Player	Opponent	Season
1	301*	Aakash Chopra	Maharashtra	2010/11
2	257	**Vineet Saxena**	Tamil Nadu	2011/12
3	246*	Rusi Surti	Uttar Pradesh	1959/60
4	237*	Gagan Khoda	Uttar Pradesh	1994/95
5	231*	Laxman Singh	Madhya Pradesh	1974/75
Source: CricketArchive. Last updated: 16 October 2016.

== Bowling records ==
=== Best innings bowling ===
Rank	Score	Player	Opponent	Season
1	10/78	Pradeep Sunderam	Vidarbha	1985/86
2	8/10	**Deepak Chahar**	Hyderabad	2012/13
3	8/32	**Pankaj Singh**	Tripura	1969/70
4	8/45	Subhash Gupte	Vidarbha	2002/03
5	8/60	Sanju Mudkavi	Railways	2002/03
Source: CricketArchive. Last updated: 16 October 2016.

=== Hat-Trick ===
Player	Opponent	Season
Kailash Gattani	Uttar Pradesh	1969/70
Source: CricketArchive. Last updated: 16 October 2016.

== Notes ==
All lists are referenced to CricketArchive.

== See also ==
- Rajasthan cricket team
- List of Rajasthan List A cricket records
