= Abdul Hai =

Abdul Hai (Arabic: عبد الحي, romanized: Abd al-Ḥayy) is a Muslim male given name, and in modern usage, surname. It is built from the Arabic words Abd, al- and Hayy. The name means "servant of the Living God", Al-Hayy being one of the names of God in the Qur'an, which give rise to the Muslim theophoric names.

The letter a of the al- is unstressed, and can be transliterated by almost any vowel, often by e. So the first part can appear as Abdel, Abdul or Abd-al. The second part may appear as Hai, Hay, Hayy or in other ways. The whole name is subject to variable spacing and hyphenation.

Notable people with the name include:

- Abdul Hai (UK politician) (born 1974 or 1975), British Bangladeshi acquitted of murdering Richard Everitt, later a Labour councillor in Camden
- Abdul Hai (Bangladeshi politician), former MP for the Naogaon-5 constituency in Bangladesh
- Abdul Hai (chief justice) (fl. late 1500s), Armenian Mir Adl in the Mughal Empire
- Saʿīd Abdul-Hay ibn Dhaḥḥāk ibn Maḥmūd Gardēzī, or just Abu Saʿīd Gardēzī, (died ca. 1061), Persian historian
- Muhammad Abdul-Hayy Siddiqui, known as Bekhud Badayuni (1857–1912), Indian Urdu poet
- Saleh Abdel Hai (1896–1962), Egyptian singer
- Abdul Hai Habibi (1910–1984), Afghan scholar and historian
- Mohammed Abdul-Hayy (1944–1989), Sudanese poet
- Daniel Abdal-Hayy Moore, known as Daniel Moore (poet), (born 1940), American poet, essayist and librettist
- Asif Abdulhai Mulla, or just Asif Mulla (born 1980), Indian-Canadian cricketer
- Abdul Hai Baloch, Pakistani politician
- Abdul Hai Neamati, Afghan politician
- Abdul Hai (Delhi cricketer), active 1934–1936
- Abdul Hai (Hyderabad cricketer), Hyderabad cricketer
- Muhammad Abdul Hye (1919–1969), Bengali litterateur and linguist
- Abdul Hai Arifi, Pakistani Islamic scholar (1898 – 1986)
- Abd al-Hayy al-Lucknawi, Indian Islamic Hanafi scholar (1848–1886)
- Md. Abdul Hai, Bangladeshi politician
- Abdul Hyee, Bangladeshi politician
