= 1969–70 Ranji Trophy =

Indian cricket tournament

- The Ranji Trophy
- Administrator(s): BCCI
- Cricket format: First-class
- Tournament format(s): League and knockout
- Champions: Bombay (21st title)
- Participants: 23
- Most runs: Ashok Mankad (Bombay) (540)
- Most wickets: Kailash Gattani (Rajasthan) (41)

The 1969–70 Ranji Trophy was the 36th season of the Ranji Trophy. Bombay retained the title defeating Rajasthan in the final.

== Group stage ==
=== South Zone ===
Team	Pld	W	L	D	T	NR	Pts	Q
Mysore	4	2	0	2	0	0	26	2.187
Madras	4	1	0	3	0	0	24	1.873
Hyderabad	4	1	0	3	0	0	18	1.053
Andhra	4	0	1	3	0	0	11	0.615
Kerala	4	0	3	1	0	0	3	0.429

=== Central Zone ===
Team	Pld	W	L	D	T	NR	Pts	Q
Rajasthan	3	1	0	2	0	0	16	1.581
Madhya Pradesh	3	0	0	3	0	0	11	1.019
Vidarbha	3	0	0	3	0	0	11	0.698
Uttar Pradesh	3	0	1	2	0	0	10	1.061

=== North Zone ===
Team	Pld	W	L	D	T	NR	Pts	Q
Railways	4	1	0	3	0	0	24	1.335
Delhi	4	2	0	2	0	0	23	1.341
Services	4	1	0	3	0	0	21	1.492
Punjab	4	1	1	2	0	0	15	1.115
Jammu & Kashmir	4	0	4	0	0	0	0	0.321

=== West Zone ===
Team	Pld	W	L	D	T	NR	Pts	Q
Bombay	4	2	0	2	0	0	26	1.645
Maharashtra	4	1	0	3	0	0	24	1.376
Gujarat	4	1	0	3	0	0	20	1.243
Saurashtra	4	1	3	0	0	0	8	0.854
Baroda	4	0	2	2	0	0	6	0.407

=== East Zone ===
Team	Pld	W	L	D	T	NR	Pts	Q
Bengal	3	3	0	0	0	0	24	3.468
Bihar	3	2	1	0	0	0	16	1.729
Assam	3	1	2	0	0	0	8	0.497
Orissa	3	0	3	0	0	0	0	0.412

== Knockout stage ==
Quarter-finals
13 Mar 1970 – Jaipur
Rajasthan	225 & 144/6
Railways	149 & 219

Semi-finals
20 Mar 1970 – Bombay
Bombay	520/8d & 57/0
Mysore	309 & 346/8d
20 Mar 1970 – Jaipur
Rajasthan	243
Bengal	74 & 135

Final
2 Apr 1970 – Bombay
Bombay	531
Rajasthan	217 & 255

=== Final ===
2–6 April 1970
Scorecard

Rajasthan	v	Bombay (H)
217 (85.2 overs); Parthasarathy Sharma 67; Abdul Ismail 4/58		531 (160.1 overs); Ashok Mankad 171, Sunil Gavaskar 114; Salim Durani 4/141
255 (113.3 overs); Suryaveer Singh 69; Milind Rege 4/75

Bombay won by an innings and 59 runs
Brabourne Stadium, Bombay
Umpires: Sambhu Pan and N. S. Rishi

- Rajasthan won the toss and decided to bat

== Scorecards and averages ==
- CricketArchive
