= List of Rajasthan List A cricket records =

This is a List of Rajasthan List A cricket records, with each list containing the top five performances in the category.

Currently active players are bolded.

== Team records ==
=== Highest innings totals ===
Rank	Score	Opponent	Season
1	316/6	Madhya Pradesh	2014/15
2	305/5	Mumbai	2015/16
3	303/7	Madhya Pradesh	2009/10
4	298/7	Madhya Pradesh	2005/06
5	295/4 dec	Madhya Pradesh	2006/07
Source: CricketArchive. Last updated: 18 October 2016.

=== Lowest innings totals ===
Rank	Score	Opponent	Season
1	35	Railways	2014/15
2	70	Tamil Nadu	2003/04
3	73	Bombay	1980/81
4	77	Railways	2013/14
Source: CricketArchive. Last updated: 18 October 2016.

== Batting records ==
=== Highest individual scores ===
Rank	Score	Player	Opponent	Season
1	166*	Gagan Khoda	Railways	2005/06
2	147*	Rohit Sharma	Uttar Pradesh	2007/08
3	126	Gagan Khoda	Uttar Pradesh	1998/99
4	123	**Puneet Yadav**	Railways	2012/13
5	122	Rashmi Parida	Madhya Pradesh	2009/10
Source: CricketArchive. Last updated: 18 October 2016.

== Bowling records ==
=== Best innings bowling ===
Rank	Score	Player	Opponent	Season
1	6/50	**Pankaj Singh**	Vidarbha	2014/15
2	5/17	**Rajat Bhatia**	Assam	2015/16
3	5/26	Shamsher Singh	Vidarbha	1998/99
4	5/46	Gajendra Singh	Madhya Pradesh	2003/04
5	4/22	Anup Dave	Railways	2007/08
Source: CricketArchive. Last updated: 18 October 2016.

== See also ==
- Rajasthan cricket team
- List of Rajasthan first-class cricket records
