= 1966–67 Ranji Trophy =

Indian cricket tournament

- The Ranji Trophy
- Administrator(s): BCCI
- Cricket format: First-class
- Tournament format(s): League and knockout
- Champions: Bombay (18th title)
- Participants: 24
- Most runs: Hanumant Singh (Rajasthan) (869)
- Most wickets: B. S. Chandrasekhar (Mysore) (35)

The 1966–67 Ranji Trophy was the 33rd season of the Ranji Trophy. Bombay won the title defeating Rajasthan in the final. This was the sixth final in seven years between the teams all of which were won by Bombay.

== Group stage ==
=== South Zone ===
Team	Pld	W	L	D	T	NR	Pts	Q
Mysore	4	4	0	0	0	0	34	2.176
Madras	4	2	1	1	0	0	23	1.254
Kerala	4	1	1	2	0	0	16	0.805
Andhra	4	0	2	2	0	0	6	0.412
Hyderabad	4	0	3	1	0	0	5	0.997

=== North Zone ===
Team	Pld	W	L	D	T	NR	Pts	Q
Railways	5	3	0	2	0	0	36	1.831
Services	5	3	0	2	0	0	36	1.748
Delhi	5	1	0	4	0	0	26	1.066
Southern Punjab	5	1	2	2	0	0	12	0.977
Northern Punjab	5	0	2	3	0	0	3	0.658
Jammu & Kashmir	5	0	4	1	0	0	0	0.275

=== East Zone ===
Team	Pld	W	L	D	T	NR	Pts	Q
Bengal	3	2	0	1	0	0	19	1.501
Bihar	3	2	0	1	0	0	14	0.845
Assam	3	1	2	0	0	0	11	0.953
Orissa	3	0	3	0	0	0	5	0.843

=== West Zone ===
Team	Pld	W	L	D	T	NR	Pts	Q
Bombay	4	3	0	1	0	0	30	2.527
Maharashtra	4	1	1	2	0	0	19	1.261
Gujarat	4	2	2	0	0	0	16	0.885
Baroda	4	1	1	2	0	0	14	0.664
Saurashtra	4	0	3	1	0	0	3	0.567

=== Central Zone ===
Team	Pld	W	L	D	T	NR	Pts	Q
Rajasthan	3	1	0	2	0	0	19	1.501
Vidarbha	3	1	0	2	0	0	14	0.845
Madhya Pradesh	3	1	1	1	0	0	11	0.953
Uttar Pradesh	3	0	2	1	0	0	5	0.843

== Knockout stage ==
Quarter-finals
24 Feb 1967 – Calcutta
Bengal	202 & 331
Railways	163 & 264/7

Semi-finals
24 Feb 1967 – Bombay
Bombay	602/7d
Mysore	341 & 256
9 Mar 1967 – Bangalore
Bengal	100 & 150
Rajasthan	204 & 200

Final
23 Mar 1967 – Bombay
Bombay	586/7d & 52/2
Rajasthan	284 & 445/7d

=== Final ===
23–27 March 1967
Scorecard

Rajasthan	v	Bombay (H)
284 (144.4 overs); Hanumant Singh 109; Arun Varde 3/34		586/7 decl (171 overs); Dilip Sardesai 199, Manohar Hardikar 108, R. G. Nadkarni 103; Chandrasekhar Joshi 4/182
445/7 decl (168 overs); Hanumant Singh 213*, Suryaveer Singh 132; Dilip Sardesai 2/15		54/2 (14 overs); Ashok Mankad 25*; Salim Durani 1/13

Bombay won on first innings lead
Brabourne Stadium, Bombay
Umpires: I. Gopalakrishnan and B. Satyaji Rao

- Bombay won the toss and decided to field
- Brothers Hanumant Singh and Suryaveer Singh added 176 and 213 in the two innings.
- Hanumant Singh became the first Indian batsman to score a hundred and double hundred in the same first class match.

== Scorecards and averages ==
- ESPNcricinfo
- CricketArchive
