= 2011–12 Ranji Trophy =

- The Ranji trophy, which the winners get.
- Administrator(s): BCCI
- Cricket format: First-class cricket
- Tournament format(s): Round-robin then knockout
- Champions: Rajasthan (2nd title)
- Participants: 27
- Most runs: Robin Bist (Rajasthan) (1034)
- Most wickets: TP Sudhindra (Madhya Pradesh) (40)

The 2011–12 Ranji Trophy season is the 78th Ranji trophy season. It is being contested through two leagues: Super and Plate. Each division is divided into 2 groups – A and B, each team plays all the other teams from its group only once either home or away.

The Super League is divided into two groups of eight and seven teams, while the Plate League is divided into two groups of six teams each. The top two from each Plate sub-group contest semi-finals; the winners of these two matches then join the top three from each Super League sub-group in an eight-team knock-out tournament. The winner of this knock-out tournament then wins the Ranji Trophy. Knock-out matches are decided on the first innings result if the result is a draw.

== Points summary ==
Points in the league stages of both divisions are awarded as follows:

Scenario	Points
Win Outright	5
Bonus Point (for innings and 10 wicket wins)	1
1st Innings Lead	3 ^{*}
No Result	1
1st Innings Deficit	1 ^{*}
Lost Outright	0

note^{*} – If match ends in a draw.

== Teams ==
=== Super League ===
Group A

- Mumbai
- Karnataka
- Uttar Pradesh
- Saurashtra
- Punjab
- Railways
- Rajasthan
- Orissa

Group B

- Baroda
- Madhya Pradesh
- Tamil Nadu
- Gujarat
- Haryana
- Bengal
- Delhi

=== Plate League ===
Group A

- Kerala
- Vidarbha
- Himachal
- Andhra Pradesh
- Services
- Tripura

Group B

- Hyderabad
- Maharashtra
- Goa
- Jammu & Kashmir
- Jharkhand (formerly known as Bihar)
- Assam

== Points Table ==
=== Super League ===
Key to colours in group tables
Advanced to the knockout rounds(Super League).
Relegation to the Plate league

Super league – Group A

Teams	Matches	Won	Lost	Tied	Draw	No results	Points	Quotient
Mumbai	7	3	0	0	4	0	25	1.437
Karnataka	7	2	0	0	5	0	22	1.380
Rajasthan	7	2	0	0	5	0	16	0.984
Saurashtra	7	2	1	0	4	0	16	0.925
Uttar Pradesh	7	0	1	0	6	0	16	1.02
Punjab	7	1	2	0	4	0	15	0.887
Railways	7	1	3	0	3	0	13	0.940
Orissa	7	0	5	0	2	0	2	0.541

Super League – Group B

Teams	Matches	Won	Lost	Tied	Draw	No results	Points	Quotient
Tamil Nadu	6	1	0	0	4	1	20	1.408
Madhya Pradesh	6	2	1	0	3	0	17	1.011
Haryana	6	1	0	0	5	0	14	0.998
Baroda	6	2	1	0	2	1	13	1.238
Bengal	6	1	1	0	4	0	13	1.162
Delhi	6	1	2	0	3	0	11	0.937
Gujarat	6	1	3	0	2	0	8	0.744

=== Plate League ===
Plate League – Group A

Key to colours in group tables
Advanced to the knockout stage (Plate League)

Teams	Matches	Won	Lost	Tied	Draw	No results	Points	Quotient
Vidarbha	5	1	0	0	4	0	15	1.382
Himachal Pradesh	5	1	1	0	3	0	15	1.277
Kerala	5	2	0	0	3	0	14	0.976
Andhra	5	1	1	0	3	0	12	1.12
Services	5	1	0	0	4	0	11	0.916
Tripura	5	0	4	0	1	0	1	0.65

Plate League – Group B

Teams	Matches	Won	Lost	Tied	Draw	No results	Points	Quotient
Maharashtra	5	3	0	0	2	0	22	1.519
Hyderabad	5	2	1	0	2	0	16	1.677
Goa	5	1	2	0	2	0	9	0.963
Jharkhand	5	1	1	0	3	0	9	0.691
Jammu & Kashmir	5	0	1	0	4	0	8	0.708
Assam	5	0	2	0	3	0	6	0.719

== Knock-out Stage ==
Plate Semifinals
PA1	Vidarbha	531
PB2	Hyderabad	486/8
PB1	Maharashtra	415 & 283/5
PA2	Himachal Pradesh	236

Quarterfinals
PB2	Hyderabad	144 & 431/2d
A3	Rajasthan	421 & 25/0
A2	Karnataka	151 & 262
B3	Haryana	272 & 144/4
B2	Madhya Pradesh	192 & 473/3d
A1	Mumbai	434 & 113/1
PB1	Maharashtra	232 & 322/4d
B1	Tamil Nadu	415 & 45/1

Semifinals
A3	Rajasthan	89 & 192
B3	Haryana	97 & 120
A1	Mumbai	157 & 88/3
B1	Tamil Nadu	359 & 331/8d

Final
A3	Rajasthan	621 & 204/5d
B1	Tamil Nadu	295 & 8/2

=== Plate League ===
The two top teams from each group of the Plate league will meet in semi-finals, the winners of which will qualify for quarter-finals of the Super league.

Match	Teams	Ground	Scores	Result
Semi-final	Vidarbha v Hyderabad	Nagpur	Vidarbha 531; Hyderabad 486/8	Match drawn (Hyderabad goes through on run-rate)
Semi-final	Maharashtra v Himachal Pradesh	Pune	Maharashtra 415 and 283/5; Himachal Pradesh 236	Match drawn (Maharashtra goes through on First innings lead)

Teams Advanced to the knockout stage (Super League)
Maharashtra
Hyderabad

=== Super League ===
The top three teams of each group of the Super league along with the two winners of the semi-finals from plate league will qualify for the quarter-finals.

Match	Teams	Ground	Scores	Result
Quarter-final 1	Hyderabad v Rajasthan	Hyderabad	Rajasthan 421 and 25/0; Hyderabad 144 and 431/2d	Rajasthan won on 1st innings lead
Quarter-final 2	Karnataka v Haryana	Bangalore	Karnataka 151 and 262; Haryana 272 and 144/4	Haryana won by 6 wickets
Quarter-final 3	Madhya Pradesh v Mumbai	Indore	Madhya Pradesh 192 and 474/3d; Mumbai 434 and 113/1	Mumbai won on 1st innings lead
Quarter-final 4	Tamil Nadu v Maharashtra	Chennai	Maharashtra 232 and 322/4d; Tamil Nadu 415 and 45/1	Tamil Nadu won on 1st innings lead

=== Semi-finals ===
10-12 January 2012
Scorecard

Rajasthan	v	Haryana (H)
89 (36.1 overs); Vineet Saxena 32 (86); Harshal Patel 8/34 (15.1 overs)		97 (47.5 overs); Jayant Yadav 23 (61); Rituraj Singh 7/45 (18.5 overs)
192 (68.5 overs); Vineet Saxena 58 (119); Sachin Rana 4/26 (14.3 overs)		120 (48.5 overs); Sachin Rana 25 (61); Rituraj Singh 5/37 (17.5 overs)

Rajasthan won by 64 runs
Chaudhary Bansi Lal Cricket Stadium, Rohtak
Umpires: Sundaram Ravi and Shavir Tarapore
Player of the match: Rituraj Singh (Rajasthan)

- Rajasthan won the toss and elected to bat

10-13 January 2012
Scorecard

Tamil Nadu	v	Mumbai (H)
359 (136.1 overs); Ramaswamy Prasanna 104 (232); Balwinder Sandhu 5/88 (26.1 overs)		157 (51 overs); Suryakumar Yadav 52 (57); Lakshmipathy Balaji 4/28 (15 overs)
331/8d (113.1 overs); Murali Vijay 142 (250); Balwinder Sandhu 5/74 (33.1 overs)		88/3 (29 overs); Suryakumar Yadav 33 (56); Jagannathan Kaushik 2/6 (4 overs)

Match drawn (Tamil Nadu won on 1st innings)
Wankhede Stadium, Mumbai
Umpires: Peter Hartley and Krishna Hariharan
Player of the match: Ramaswamy Prasanna (Tamil Nadu)

- Mumbai won the toss and elected to field

=== Final ===
19-23 January 2012
Scorecard

Rajasthan	v	Tamil Nadu (H)
621 (245 overs); Vineet Saxena 257 (665); Aushik Srinivas 4/192 (85 overs)		295 (102.4 overs); Dinesh Karthik 150 (280); Rituraj Singh 4/76 (26 overs)
204/5d (77 overs); Robin Bist 92 (185); Ramaswamy Prasanna 3/31 (21 overs)		8/2 (13 overs); Kuthethurshri Vasudevadas 7* (43); Gajendra Singh 2/5 (6 overs)

Match drawn (Rajasthan won on 1st innings)
MA Chidambaram Stadium, Chennai
Umpires: Peter Hartley and Vineet Kulkarni
Player of the match: Vineet Saxena (Rajasthan)

- Rajasthan won the toss and elected to bat
- Rajasthan won the Ranji Trophy 2nd time in a row.

== Statistics ==
=== Most Runs ===
Player	Team	Matches	Inns	NO	Runs	HS	Ave	100s	50s
Robin Bist	Rajasthan	10	16	4	1034	176	86.16	4	4
Vineet Saxena	Rajasthan	10	18	1	897	257	52.76	2	5
Abhinav Mukund	Tamil Nadu	9	15	3	872	220	72.66	2	3
Suryakumar Yadav	Mumbai	9	11	0	754	200	68.54	2	5
Stuart Binny	Karnataka	8	11	0	742	189	67.45	3	3
Dheeraj Jadhav	Assam	5	9	5	704	135*	176.00	5	1
Akshath Reddy	Hyderabad	7	11	1	687	151	68.7	4	2
Naman Ojha	Madhya Pradesh	7	11	0	668	160	60.72	3	2
KB Pawan	Karnataka	8	13	2	659	251*	59.90	2	2
Mayank Sidhana	Punjab	7	12	1	636	122	57.81	1	4

=== Most Wickets ===
Player	Team	Matches	Innings	Overs	Wickets	BBI	BBM	5/i	10/m	Ave.
TP Sudhindra	Madhya Pradesh	7	14	310.4	40	7/48	10/131	4	1	18.70
Ashok Dinda	Bengal	6	10	258.4	37	7/44	12/142	4	2	20.64
Akshay Darekar	Maharashtra	7	13	294	35	8/20	13/68	4	1	19.89
Pankaj Singh	Rajasthan	10	15	368.0	34	5/64	7/113	2	0	30.32
Jagannathan Kaushik	Tamil Nadu	7	12	221.0	28	5/56	6/101	1	0	21.78
Samad Fallah	Maharashtra	7	13	266.2	28	4/31	6/125	0	0	23.61
Parvinder Awana	Delhi	6	10	232.0	28	5/52	8/144	2	0	26.60
KP Appanna	Karnataka	8	14	282.5	28	6/68	11/107	2	1	29.53
Harshal Patel	Haryana	7	12	207.0	28	8/34	10/79	2	1	30.62
Rishi Dhawan	Himachal Pradesh	6	12	260.2	27	5/60	8/170	2	0	30.44
