= Vivek Yadav =

Indian cricketer (1984–2021)

Personal information
- Born: 9 December 1984; Rohtak, Haryana, India
- Died: 5 May 2021 (aged 36)
- Role: Right-arm leg spin

Domestic team information
- Years: Team
- 2004/05–2013/14: Rajasthan cricket team

Career statistics
Competition	FC	LA	T20
Matches	18	8	4
Runs scored	349	79	7
Batting average	15.17	15.80	7.00
100s/50s	0/0	0/0	0/0
Top score	46	28	7
Balls bowled	3305	354	90
Wickets	57	9	2
Bowling average	30.87	33.22	51.00
5 wickets in innings	2	0	0
10 wickets in match	0	0	0
Best bowling	6/134	3/44	1/20
Catches/stumpings	11/0	0/0	0/0
- Source: ESPNcricinfo, 30 March 2018

Vivek Yadav (9 December 1984 – 5 May 2021) was an Indian cricketer who played for Rajasthan in first-class, List A and T20 matches. He was a primary bowler who bowled leg spin. Though he was known to be a front line bowler, he was known for scoring a knock of 287 runs in an unofficial tournament which was sponsored by the Jaipur District Cricket Association in 2013 with the remembrance of the Rajasthan cricketer, Shamsher Singh, who died due to a heart attack at the age of 40 in 2013.

== Career ==
He appeared in 18 first-class cricket matches and was a prominent leg spinner taking 57 wickets in first-class cricket matches.

He was part of the Rajasthan team which won the 2011 Ranji Trophy beating Baroda in the final as the victory was calculated considering the first innings team total of both the teams where the match ended in a draw. He claimed four wickets in the Baroda's first innings score of 361.

Vivek Yadav was bought by the Delhi Daredevils team for the 2011 Indian Premier League season. However, he didn't feature in any of the matches for the Delhi Daredevils team during the 2011 season. He was also sacked from the team for the 2012 IPL season.

== Death ==
He died on 5 May 2021, from complications from stomach cancer and COVID-19.
