= Vikrant Yadav =

Indian cricketer (born 1982)

Personal information
- Full name: Vikrant Sajjan Yadav
- Born: 14 December 1982 (age 43); Udaipur, India
- Batting: Right-handed
- Source: ESPNcricinfo, 30 November 2016

Vikrant Yadav (born 14 December 1982) is an Indian first-class cricketer who represented Rajasthan. He made his first-class debut for Rajasthan in the 2006-07 Ranji Trophy on 9 December 2006.
