= Rajesh Bishnoi =

Indian cricketer (born 1987)

Personal information
- Born: 8 October 1987 (age 39); Bikaner, Rajasthan, India
- Batting: Right-handed
- Bowling: Right-arm medium-fast
- Role: Allrounder

Domestic team information
- Years: Team
- 2009: Royal Challengers Bangalore

Career statistics
| Competition | FC | LA | T20 |
|---|---|---|---|
| Matches | 43 | 30 | 35 |
| Runs scored | 2009 | 551 | 609 |
| Batting average | 30.43 | 22.95 | 19.64 |
| 100s/50s | 4/9 | 0/3 | 0/4 |
| Top score | 112 | 94 | 75 |
| Balls bowled | 282 | 267 | 6 |
| Wickets | 1 | 2 | – |
| Bowling average | 192.00 | 112.00 | – |
| 5 wickets in innings | 0 | 0 | – |
| 10 wickets in match | 0 | 0 | – |
| Best bowling | 1/27 | 1/8 | – |
| Catches/stumpings | 20/– | 7/– | 18/– |
- Source: ESPNcricinfo, 6 October 2015

Rajesh Bishnoi (born 8 October 1987) is an Indian cricketer who plays for Rajasthan. He made his first-class debut for Rajasthan in the 2006–07 Ranji Trophy on 23 November 2006. He was the leading run-scorer for Rajasthan in the 2017–18 Ranji Trophy, with 436 runs in six matches.
