= Sumit Khatri =

Indian cricketer (born 1989)

Personal information
- Full name: Sumit Khatri
- Born: 15 July 1989 (age 37); Jaipur, India
- Batting: Left-handed
- Source: ESPNcricinfo, 30 November 2016

Sumit Khatri (born 15 July 1989) is an Indian first-class cricketer who represented Rajasthan. He made his first-class debut for Rajasthan in the 2006-07 Ranji Trophy on 10 January 2007.
