= Shubhanshu Vijay =

Indian cricketer (born 1986)

Personal information
- Born: 19 October 1983 (age 43); Kota, Rajasthan, India
- Batting: Right-handed
- Source: ESPNcricinfo, 30 November 2016

Shubhanshu Vijay (born 19 December 1986) is an Indian first-class cricketer who represented Rajasthan. He made his first-class debut for Rajasthan in the 2006-07 Ranji Trophy on 10 January 2007.
