= Pramod Arya =

Indian cricketer (born 1944)

Personal information
- Born: 30 August 1944 (age 82); Jodhpur, India
- Batting: Right-handed
- Source: ESPNcricinfo, 30 November 2016

Pramod Arya (born 30 August 1944) is an Indian first-class cricketer who represented Rajasthan. He made his first-class debut for Rajasthan in the 1975-76 Ranji Trophy on 21 December 1975.
