= Naresh Gehlot =

Indian cricketer (born 1982)

Personal information
- Full name: Naresh Gokul Gehlot
- Born: 24 December 1982 (age 43); Bikaner, India
- Batting: Left-handed
- Source: ESPNcricinfo, 30 November 2016

Naresh Gehlot (born 24 December 1982) is an Indian first-class cricketer who represented Rajasthan. He made his first-class debut for Rajasthan in the 2004-05 Ranji Trophy on 16 November 2004.
