= Kaushal Dewara =

Indian cricketer (born 1975)

Personal information
- Full name: Kaushal Bulakidas Dewara
- Born: 4 June 1975 (age 51); Bikaner, India
- Batting: Right-handed
- Source: ESPNcricinfo, 30 November 2016

Kaushal Dewara (born 4 June 1975) is an Indian first-class cricketer who represented Rajasthan. He made his first-class debut for Rajasthan in the 1997-98 Ranji Trophy on 5 November 1997.
