= Mohammed Wasid =

Indian cricketer (born 1973)

Personal information
- Born: 15 June 1973 (age 53); Jodhpur, India
- Batting: Right-handed
- Bowling: Right-arm offbreak
- Source: ESPNcricinfo, 29 November 2016

Mohammed Wasid (born 15 June 1973) is an Indian first-class cricketer who represented Rajasthan. He made his first-class debut for Rajasthan in the 1998-99 Ranji Trophy on 7 November 1998.
