= Pramod Yadav =

Indian cricketer (born 1975)

Personal information
- Full name: Pramod Ramnivas Yadav
- Born: 13 January 1975 (age 51); Alwar, India
- Batting: Right-handed
- Source: ESPNcricinfo, 30 November 2016

Pramod Yadav (born 13 January 1975) is an Indian first-class cricketer who represented Rajasthan. He made his first-class debut for Rajasthan in the 1996-97 Ranji Trophy on 7 November 1996.
