= Jagannathan Kaushik =

Indian cricketer (born 1985)

Kaushik Jagannathan
Personal information
- Full name: Jagannathan Kaushik
- Born: 25 October 1985 (age 41); Chennai, India
- Nickname: JK
- Source: ESPNcricinfo, 23 November 2016

Jagannathan Kaushik (born 25 October 1985) is an Indian first-class cricketer who plays for Tamil Nadu. He made his first-class debut for Tamil Nadu in the 2011–12 Ranji Trophy on 17 November 2011. Kaushik was the 4th highest wicket taker in 2011–12 Ranji Trophy, where he took 28 wickets in 7 matches.
