= Kishan Choudhary =

Indian cricketer (born 1981)

Personal information
- Full name: Kishan Joginder Singh Choudhary
- Born: 22 December 1981 (age 44); Udaipur, India
- Batting: Right-handed
- Source: ESPNcricinfo, 30 November 2016

Kishan Choudhary (born 22 December 1981) is an Indian first-class cricketer who represented Rajasthan. He made his first-class debut for Rajasthan in the 2002-03 Ranji Trophy on 9 November 2002.
