= Raman Chahar =

Indian cricketer (born 1988)

Personal information
- Full name: Raman Ramkisyhore Chahar
- Born: 3 December 1988 (age 37); Jhajjar, India
- Batting: Right-handed
- Source: ESPNcricinfo, 30 November 2016

Raman Chahar (born 3 December 1988) is an Indian first-class cricketer who represented Rajasthan. He made his first-class debut for Rajasthan in the 2010-11 Ranji Trophy on 10 November 2010.
