= Wilkin Mota =

Indian cricketer (born 1981)

Personal information
- Full name: Wilkin Arvind Mota
- Born: 20 September 1981 (age 45); Bombay, Maharashtra, India
- Batting: Right-handed
- Bowling: Right arm Medium
- Role: All-rounder

Domestic team information
- Years: Team
- 2004–2009: Mumbai
- 2008–2009: Kings XI Punjab (IPL)
- 2009–: Tripura

Career statistics
Competition	FC	LA	T20
Matches	25	16	20
Runs scored	664	175	228
Batting average	18.44	17.50	16.28
100s/50s	0/2	0/0	0/1
Top score	74	34	50
Balls bowled	3,913	612	225
Wickets	68	18	11
Bowling average	26.30	29.55	25.90
5 wickets in innings	2	0	0
10 wickets in match	0	0	0
Best bowling	6/26	4/52	3/29
Catches/stumpings	7/–	2/–	5/–
- Source: ESPNcricinfo, 22 October 2010

Wilkin Arvind Mota (born 20 September 1981) is an Indian cricketer who plays for Tripura and formerly Kings XI Punjab in the Indian Premier League for the 2008 & 2009 campaigns. He is a right-handed batsman and right-arm medium pace bowler.

Wilkin started his career in the Mumbai side where he was a squad player. His Mumbai highlight was in the Ranji Trophy Semi-Final in 2007, where he made a battling 33 coming in when Mumbai were 0–5, and then taking 6 wickets in the match to gain an unexpected win.

== Career best performances ==
Updated 22 October 2010

	Batting				Bowling			
	Score	Fixture	Venue	Season	Figures	Fixture	Venue	Season
FC	74	Mumbai v Punjab	Mohali	2006	6/26	Tripura v Rajasthan	Agartala	2009
LA	100	Tripura v Bengal	Cuttack (Rav)	2010	4/25	Tripura v Orissa	Cuttack (Rav)	2010
T20	50	Tripura v Assam	Jamadoba	2009	4/29	Tripura v Orissa	Cuttack (Sun)	2010
