= S. K. Zibbu =

Indian cricketer

Cricket information
- Batting: Right-handed
- Bowling: Right-arm medium
- Source: ESPNcricinfo, 29 November 2016

S. K. Zibbu is an Indian first-class cricketer who represented Rajasthan. He made his first-class debut for Rajasthan in the 1951-52 Ranji Trophy on 8 December 1951.
