= Yogesh Mathur =

Indian cricketer (born 1969)

Personal information
- Full name: Yogesh Murarilal Mathur
- Born: 7 June 1969 (age 57); Ajmer, India
- Batting: Right-handed
- Source: ESPNcricinfo, 30 November 2016

Yogesh Mathur (born 7 June 1969) is an Indian first-class cricketer who represented Rajasthan. He made his first-class debut for Rajasthan in the 1988-89 Ranji Trophy on 13 November 1988.
