= Ramalingam Rohit =

Indian cricketer (born 1992)

Personal information
- Born: 3 May 1992 (age 33)
- Batting: Right-handed
- Bowling: Right-arm medium-fast
- Role: Allrounder

Domestic team information
- Years: Team
- 2016/17: Tamil Nadu
- Source: Cricinfo, 6 March 2017

Ramalingam Rohit (born 3 May 1992) is an Indian cricketer. He made his List A debut for Tamil Nadu in the 2016–17 Vijay Hazare Trophy on 6 March 2017. He made his Twenty20 debut for Tamil Nadu in the 2017–18 Syed Mushtaq Ali Trophy on 25 January 2018.
