= TP Sudhindra =

Indian First Class cricketer (born 1984)

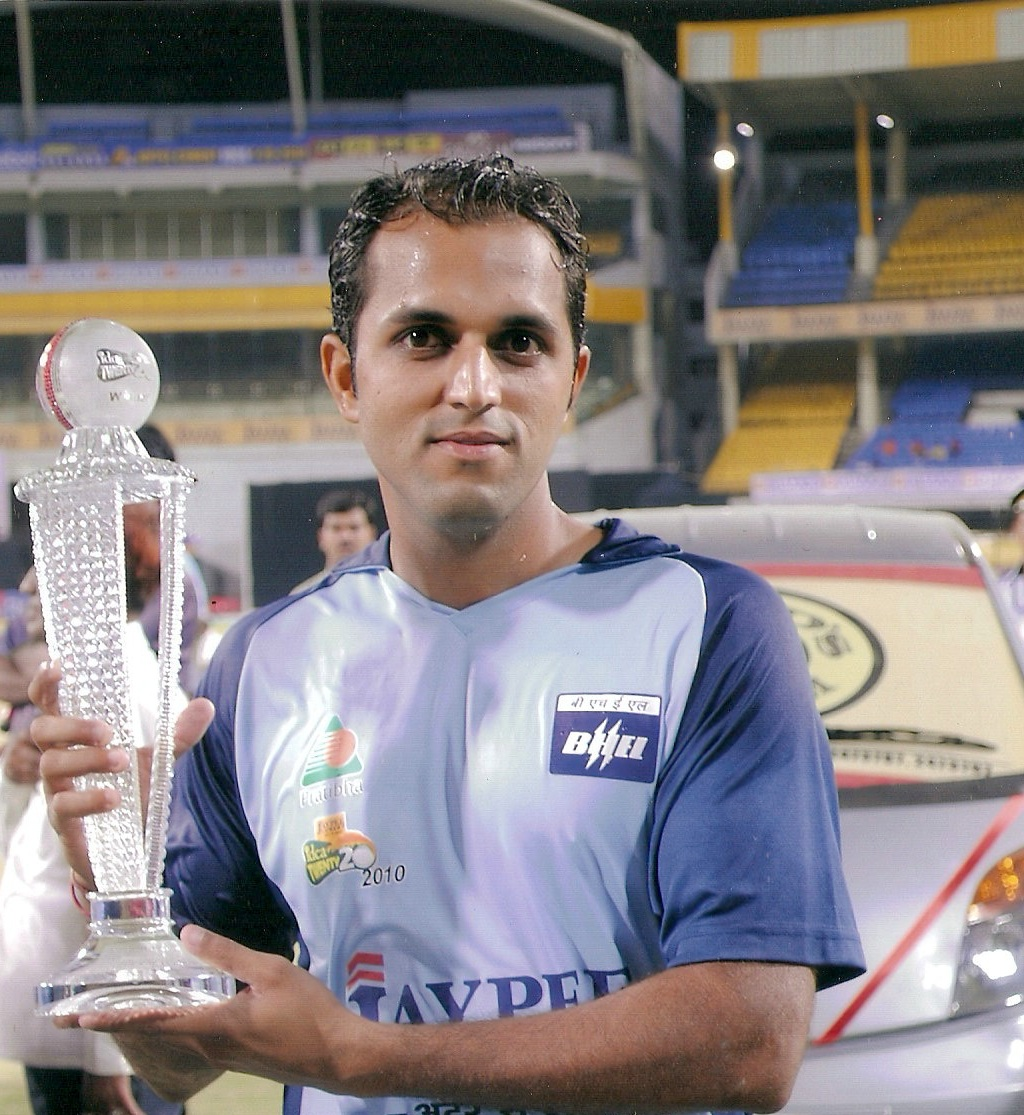

Personal information
- Full name: Taduri Prakash Chandra Sudhindra
- Born: 24 April 1984 (age 42); Hindupur, Andhra Pradesh, India
- Batting: Left-handed
- Bowling: Right-arm fast
- Role: Bowler

Domestic team information
- Years: Team
- 2005–2012: Madhya Pradesh
- 2007–2008: Delhi Giants
- 2012: Deccan Chargers

Career statistics
Competition	FC	LA	T20
Matches	27	21	27
Runs scored	369	78	75
Batting average	16.04	9.75	12.50
100s/50s	0/1	0/0	0/0
Top score	51	20	13*
Balls bowled	5937	985	637
Wickets	108	31	35
Bowling average	22.61	24.45	20.48
5 wickets in innings	6	0	1
10 wickets in match	2	0	0
Best bowling	7/48	4/53	5/30
Catches/stumpings	8/0	7/0	9/0
- Source: ESPNcricinfo, 5 July 2012

Taduri Prakash Chandra Sudhindra (born 24 April 1984) is an Indian first-class cricketer. He is a right-arm medium pace bowler and bats left-handed. Sudhindra has been banned from taking part in any official cricket matches after being found guilty of spot-fixing in domestic matches. He played Ranji Trophy for Madhya Pradesh and represented Delhi Giants and Deccan Chargers in the Indian Cricket League (ICL) and the Indian Premier League (IPL), respectively.

== Early career and personal life ==
Sudhindra was born in Hindupur, Andhra Pradesh to middle-class parents. His family currently resides in Bhilai, Chhattisgarh. He showed an intense dedication towards cricket right from his childhood. In his early playing days Sudhindra used to keep wickets, but subsequently took up bowling on his coach's advice. Sudhindra took a break from cricket during class 12 to prepare for CBSE board examination. Back in his hometown, Sudhindra resumed playing cricket and was selected to play for Chhattisgarh in the Moin-ud-Dowla Gold Cup. Sudhindra was selected for the MP Under-22 team in 2003. The call-up to the MP senior team arrived in 2005–06, after Sudhindra's impressive performance at the U-22 level.

== First Class Cricket ==
Sudhindra made his first class debut in 2005 against Jharkhand at Indore. He played 27 first-class games, representing Madhya Pradesh in the Ranji Trophy. After returning to domestic Cricket in 2009, Sudhindra picked up 25 wickets for his team in the Plate Division of the Ranji Trophy in the 2010–11 season. His splendid work with the shining and rough ball took Madhya Pradesh to the knockout stage of the Elite Division of the Ranji Trophy in the 2011–12 season. He was the leading wicket-taker for that season with 40 wickets at an average of 18.70.

== Indian Cricket League ==
A precarious financial situation at home forced Sudhindra to look towards the rebel Indian Cricket League. Sudhindra was signed up by the Delhi Giants and also represented the Indian World Team in the ICL. In 2009, he returned to the domestic fray after the BCCI granted amnesty to 79 Indian players who had ended their association with the ICL.

== Indian Premier League ==
Sudhindra earned an IPL contract with Deccan Chargers in 2012 on the back of an impressive Ranji Trophy season for Madhya Pradesh. He played three games for the Chargers in the fifth edition of IPL. Sudhindra had a disastrous outing in the tournament, picking up only one wicket and going for an economy rate of more than 11 in each of his three games. Other bowlers of his team did not fare well either. After his name cropped up in a spot-fixing incident, he was suspended by his franchise pending further enquiry.

== Spot-fixing controversy and subsequent ban ==
On 14 May 2012, Indian television channel India TV aired a sting operation on Sudhindhra to having bowled a no-ball in a domestic game at the TV channel's insistence. The said no-ball was bowled by Sudhindra in the domestic match of Madhya Pradesh Premier League T20 tournament. Following the sting operation, Sudhindra (along with four other domestic players) was suspended by the BCCI pending completion of enquiry. The case was investigated by Ravi Sawani, who submitted his report to the BCCI's disciplinary committee. The committee held Sudhindra guilty of spot-fix in a domestic cricket match, and imposed exemplary penalty of a life-ban on him from playing any cricket matches conducted or authorized by the ICC or BCCI, or any affiliated unit of the BCCI. He will not be entitled to the monthly gratis, benevolent fund, benefit match or any other facility, in lieu of. Further, he cannot hold any position in any cricket association affiliated to the BCCI, for life.

Initially, Sudhindra admitted his guilt. Later, in 2024, he addressed the controversy and the ban in the Open Magazine article written by the journalist Aditya Iyer titled Repentance Song.

=== Ban revoked ===
T.P. Sudhindra's lifetime ban was modified in February 2023 after BCCI Ombudsman Vineet Saran called the lifetime ban disproportionate. Saran noted that Sudhindra had not been provided any formal anti-corruption training. He allowed the ban to be reduced to the "period already undergone". This effectively lifted the ban from the date of order, allowing Sudhindra to return to cricket grounds.
