= Aditya Garhwal =

Indian cricketer (born 1996)

Personal information
- Full name: Aditya Narendra Garhwal
- Born: 15 April 1996 (age 30); Sikar, Rajasthan, India
- Nickname: Chhota Sehwag
- Height: 6 ft 0 in (1.83 m)
- Batting: Right-handed
- Bowling: Right-arm leg break
- Role: All-rounder

Domestic team information
- Years: Team
- 2014–present: Rajasthan

Career statistics
Competition	FC	List A	T20
Matches	4	20	32
Runs scored	62	479	471
Batting average	12.40	23.95	15.70
100s/50s	0/0	1/2	0/1
Top score	31	108	52
Balls bowled	176	141	96
Wickets	1	2	6
Bowling average	103.00	67.00	17.00
5 wickets in innings	0	0	0
10 wickets in match	0	0	0
Best bowling	1/40	1/6	2/7
Catches/stumpings	2/-	6/–	4/-
- Source: ESPNcricinfo, 27 October 2014

Aditya Narendra Garhwal (born 15 April 1996) is an Indian cricketer who plays for Rajasthan in first-class, List A and Twenty20 cricket. He is coached by former Rajasthan batsman Anshu Jain. His batting performances in the 2014/15 Vinoo Mankad Trophy have received appreciation from many current and former Indian cricketers. He is often referred to as Chota Sehwag for his attacking batting style. He was signed by Kolkata Knight Riders ahead of the 2015 Indian Premier League.

He made his first-class debut on 11 January 2020, for Rajasthan in the 2019–20 Ranji Trophy.
