= Vineet Saxena =

Indian cricketer (born 1980)

Personal information
- Full name: Vineet Ashokkumar Saxena
- Born: 3 December 1980 (age 45); Margao, Goa, India
- Batting: Right-handed
- Bowling: Right-arm off-break
- Role: Batsman

Domestic team information
- Years: Team
- 1998/99–2004/05: Rajasthan
- 2005/06: Railways
- 2006/07–2018: Uttarakhand

Career statistics
Competition	FC	LA	T20
Matches	99	12	4
Runs scored	6103	317	64
Batting average	37.21	31.70	32.00
100s/50s	13/31	0/2	0/0
Top score	257	66	39*
Balls bowled	348	6	–
Wickets	5	0	–
Bowling average	47.00	–	–
5 wickets in innings	0	–	–
10 wickets in match	0	–	–
Best bowling	2/28	–	–
Catches/stumpings	78/–	2/–	0/–
- Source: Cricinfo, 26 December 2013

Vineet Ashokkumar Saxena (born 3 December 1980) is an Indian cricketer who plays for Uttarakhand in domestic cricket. He is a right-hand batsman and off-break bowler. He is a regular member of Central Zone team in Duleep Trophy.

== Career ==
Saxena made his first-class debut for Rajasthan in February 1999 against Bengal. He represented India Under-19s in an ODI match against Sri Lanka in March that year. After Rajasthan got relegated to Plate division in the 2004/05 season, Saxena switched to Railways in the 2005/06 season. In 2006/07, he returned to playing for Rajasthan.

Saxena shot to limelight when he scored 143 against the defending champions Mumbai in the quarterfinals of the 2010-11 Ranji Trophy. He shared a 240-run second-wicket partnership with captain Hrishikesh Kanitkar which helped Rajasthan advance to the semifinals on first innings lead. In the semifinal against Tamil Nadu, he scored 72 as the match was drawn and Rajasthan advanced to the final. He had scores of 31 and 0 in the final against Baroda. Rajasthan won the trophy for the first time and Saxena finished with 566 runs from 12 innings at an average of 51.45.

In the 2011-12 Ranji Trophy season, Saxena was the second highest run-getter of the tournament, only behind teammate Robin Bist. Saxena scored 897 runs from 18 innings at an average of 52.76 with two hundreds and five fifties. In the semifinal against Haryana on a seamer-friendly wicket at Rohtak, Saxena top-scored for Rajasthan in both innings with 32 and 58, as Rajasthan went on to win by 64 runs. In the final against Tamil Nadu, Saxena scored a career-best 257 helping his team to win the trophy for the second time in succession.

== Coaching career ==
In May 2024, Saxena was appointed batting coach for the National Cricket Academy high-performance camp for Under-19 boys.
