= Daniel Moore (poet) =

American poet

Daniel Abdal-Hayy Moore
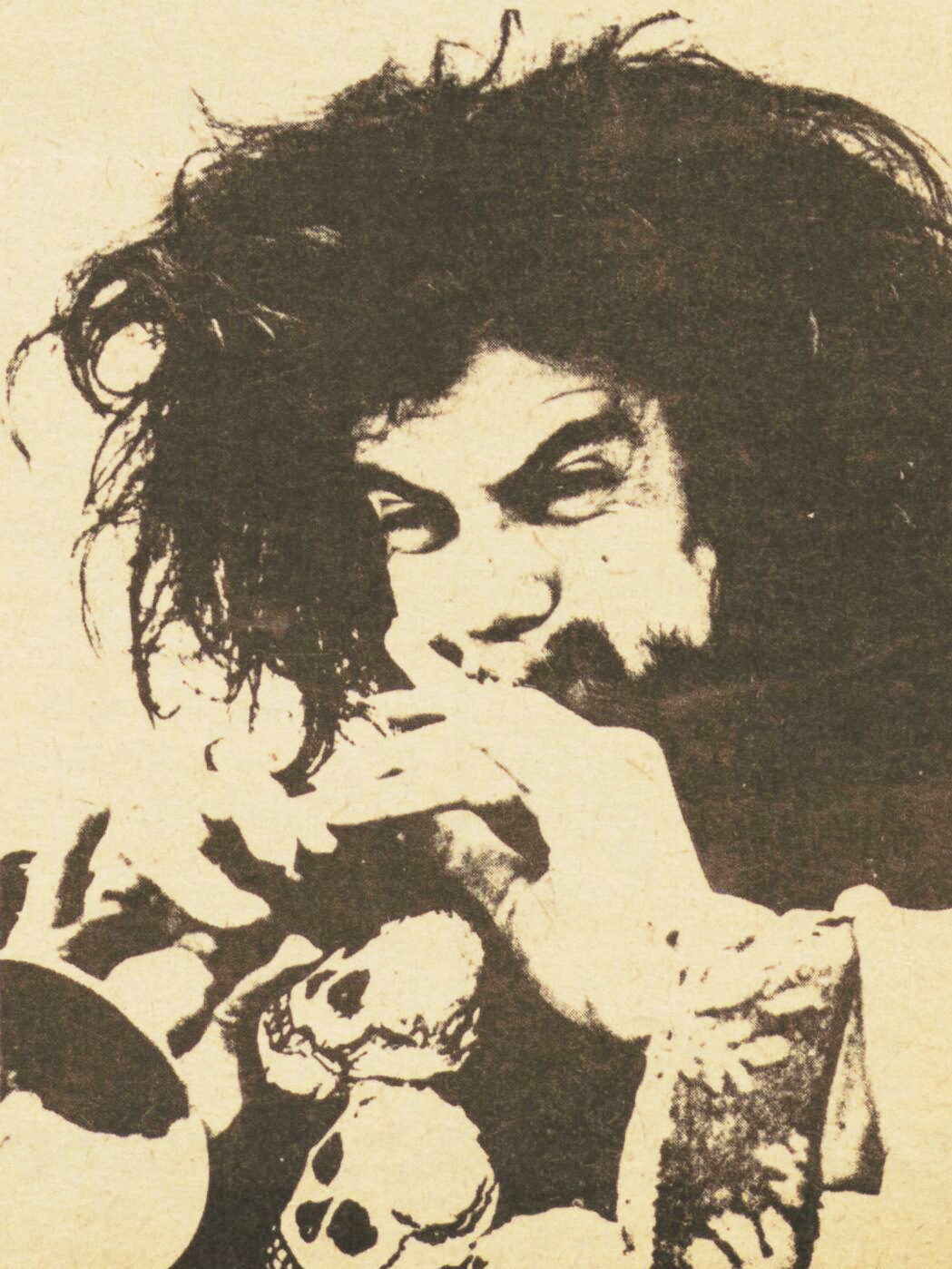
- Moore in 1968 with the Floating Lotus Magic Opera Company
- Born: Daniel Moore; July 30, 1940; Oakland, California, US
- Died: April 18, 2016 (aged 75); Philadelphia, Pennsylvania, US
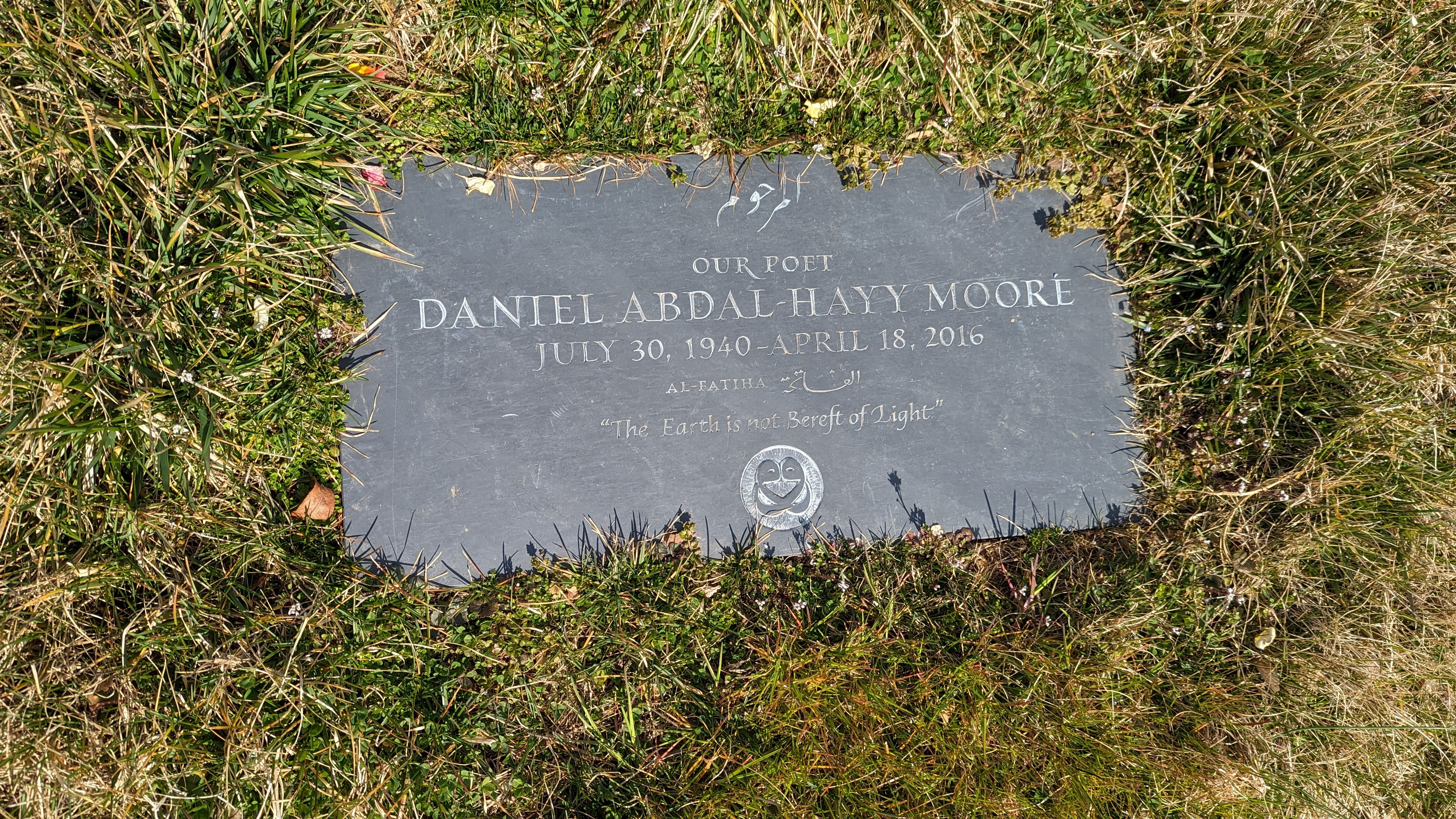
- Resting place: Bawa Muhaiyaddeen Fellowship Cemetery, East Fallowfield, Pennsylvania

Daniel Abdal-Hayy Moore (July 30, 1940 – April 18, 2016) was a U.S. poet, essayist and librettist. In 1970 he converted to the Sufi tradition of Islam and changed his name to Abdal-Hayy (eventually merging it with his birth-name). He then created works such as Ramadan Sonnets (1996) and The Blind Beekeeper (2002), most works being self-published. In early adulthood Moore traveled widely, living in Morocco, Spain, Algeria, and Nigeria as well as in Santa Barbara in the United States.

== Life & career ==
He started his career as a protégé of Beat poets Lawrence Ferlinghetti and Allen Ginsberg. Early in his career he won the Ina Coolbrith Award for poetry and the James D. Phelan Award for manuscript of unpublished poems. These manuscripts would lead to the publication of Dawn Visions (City Lights, 1964) and Burnt Heart (City Lights, 1971).

In the late 1960s he founded and lead the Floating Lotus Magic Opera Company in Berkeley, California. He served and worked as a producer, director and writer of the collective. The group rented and performed in a space that were on the former campus of Williams College which was founded by Cora Lenore Williams and operated from 1917 to 1966. Drawing on a diverse group of painters, artists, and occasional professional musicians, the company produced two major works, The Walls Are Running Blood and Bliss Apocalypse. The collective incorporated many mystical aspects of Zen Buddhism and Sufism in the form of paintings and poetry. By 1970, the collective were forced to leave the former campus of Williams College since the property was sold. They relocated to an abandoned lumber mill in Palo Alto, but disbanded after a few months.

Around the same time in 1970, Moore converted to Islam took on the name Abd al-Hayy meaning "servant of the Living God" which was given to him by Abdalqadir as-Sufi. He would then go travel Europe and North Africa and according to Lawrence Ferlinghetti “Moore [became] a Sufi and, like Rimbaud, renounced written poetry.” After 10 years of not publishing he would return to Santa Barbara, California in the 1980s and publish The Desert is the Only Way Out (Zilzal Press, 1985), The Chronicles of Akhira (Zilzal Press, 1986), and Halley’s Comet (Zilzal Press, 1986). In 1989 he wrote the libretto for a commissioned oratorio by American composer, Henry Brant, entitled Rainforest.

In 1990 he moved with his family to Philadelphia, and would go on to publish The Zen Rock Garden and a men’s movement anthology, Warrior Wisdom. Also, in 1996 he published The Ramadan Sonnets (Jusoor/City Lights), and in 2002, The Blind Beekeeper (Jusoor/Syracuse University Press). Around this time him and his wife would become members of the Bawa Muhaiyyadeen Fellowship.

In March 2000 and again in October 2001, Moore worked with the Lotus Music and Dance Studio in New York, providing and performing his own poetic narration for their multicultural production of The New York Ramayana. He also revived his theatrical work through The Floating Lotus Magic Puppet Theater, staging The Mystical Romance of Layla & Majnun with a combination of live actors and hand puppets. During this period he wrote the scenario and narration for The Eagle Dance: A Tribute to the Mohawk High Steel Workers, directing a collaboration between traditional Mohawk performers and contemporary dancers. The piece was originally scheduled to premiere in New York on September 22, 2001, but was postponed and later presented on March 16, 2002 at Aaron Davis Hall in Harlem. He also participated in The People’s Poetry Gathering in New York, where he performed a cabaret-style version of The New York Ramayana at the Bowery Poetry Club and took part in a panel discussion titled The Poet in the World: Words in Community.

In 2011, 2012, and 2014 he was a recipient of a Nazim Hikmet Award for poetry in memory of the Turkish poet Nâzim Hikmet Ran.

On April 18, 2016 Daniel Abdal-Hayy Moore died from cancer in Philadelphia, Pennsylvania and buried at the Bawa Muhaiyaddeen Cemetery.

In 2023, his wife would publish a Shore Beyond Water, which contained unpublished poems.

== Published works ==
=== Poetic works ===
- Dawn Visions (City Lights Books, San Francisco, 1964)
- This Body of Black Light (Fred Stone, Cambridge, 1965)
- Burnt Heart (City Lights Books, San Francisco, 1971)
- The Desert is the Only Way Out (Zilzal Press, Santa Barbara, 1985)
- The Chronicles of Akhira (Zilzal Press, Santa Barbara, 1986)
- Halley's Comet (Zilzal Press, Santa Barbara, 1986)
- Atomic Dance (am here books, Santa Barbara, 1988)
- Awake As Never Before (Zilzal Press, Philadelphia, 1993)
- The Quest for Beauty —illustrated by Sara Steele (Zilzal Press, Philadelphia, 1994)
- Roses, A Selection of Poems (Zilzal Press, Philadelphia, 1994)
- Maulood, a poem in praise of The Prophet Muhammad (Zilzal Press, Philadelphia, 1995)
- Mecca/Medina Time-Warp (Zilzal Press, Philadelphia, 1996)
- The Ramadan Sonnets (Kitab/City Lights Books, Bethesda/San Francisco, 1996)
- The Blind Beekeeper (Zilzal Press Chapbook, Philadelphia, 1999)
- The Blind Beekeeper, Poems (Jusoor/Syracuse University Press, Syracuse, 2001)
- Mars & Beyond (The Ecstatic Exchange, 2005)
- Salt Prayers (The Ecstatic Exchange, 2005)
- Laughing Buddha Weeping Sufi (The Ecstatic Exchange, 2005)
- Ramadan Sonnets (The Ecstatic Exchange, 2005)
- Psalms for the Brokenhearted (The Ecstatic Exchange, 2006)
- I Imagine a Lion (The Ecstatic Exchange, 2006)
- Coattails of the Saint (The Ecstatic Exchange, 2006)
- Love is a Letter Burning in a High Wind (The Ecstatic Exchange, 2006)
- Abdallah Jones and the Disappearing-Dust Caper (The Ecstatic Exchange, 2006)
- The Flame of Transformation Turns to Light/Ninety-Nine Ghazals Written in English (The Ecstatic Exchange, 2007)
- Underwater Galaxies (The Ecstatic Exchange, 2007)
- The Music Space (The Ecstatic Exchange, 2007)
- Cooked Oranges (The Ecstatic Exchange, 2007)
- Through Rose Colored Glasses (The Ecstatic Exchange, 2008)
- Like When You Wave at a Train and the Train Hoots Back at You/Farid's Book (The Ecstatic Exchange, 2008)
- In the Realm of Neither (The Ecstatic Exchange, 2008)
- The Fire Eater's Lunchbreak (The Ecstatic Exchange, 2008)
- Millennial Prognostications (The Ecstatic Exchange, 2008)
- You Open a Door and It's a Starry Night (The Ecstatic Exchange, 2009)
- Where Death Goes (The Ecstatic Exchange, 2009)
- Shaking the Quicksilver Pool (The Ecstatic Exchange, 2009)
- The Perfect Orchestra (The Ecstatic Exchange, 2009)
- Sparrow on the Prophet's Tomb (The Ecstatic Exchange, 2009)
- A Maddening Disregard for the Passage of Time (The Ecstatic Exchange, 2009)
- Stretched Out on Amethysts (The Ecstatic Exchange, 2010)
- Invention of the Wheel (The Ecstatic Exchange, 2010)
- Chants for the Beauty Feast (The Ecstatic Exchange, 2011)
- In Constant Incandescence (The Ecstatic Exchange, 2011)
- Holiday from the Perfect Crime (The Ecstatic Exchange, 2011)
- The Caged Bear Spies the Angel (The Ecstatic Exchange, 2011)
- The Puzzle (The Ecstatic Exchange, 2011)
- Ramadan is Burnished Sunlight (The Ecstatic Exchange, 2011)
- Ala-udeen & The Magic Lamp (with illustrations by the author) (The Ecstatic Exchange, 2011)
- The Crown of Creation (with illustrations by the author) (The Ecstatic Exchange, 2012)
- Blood Songs (The Ecstatic Exchange, 2012), 2013 American Book Award
- Down at the Deep End The Ecstatic Exchange, 2012)
- Next Life (The Ecstatic Exchange, 2013)
- A Hundred Little 3D Pictures (The Ecstatic Exchange, 2013)
- Miracle Songs for the Millennium (The Ecstatic Exchange, 2014)
- He Comes Running, A Turkish Sojourn, and Myths We Never Knew (The Ecstatic Exchange, 2014)

=== Theatrical works ===
==== The Floating Lotus Magic Opera Company ====
- The Walls are Running Blood (1968)
- Bliss Apocalypse (1970)
- Bliss Apocalypse Contemporaries: 28 New American Poets (Viking Press, New York 1972)

==== Bawa Muhaiyaddeen Fellowship plays ====
- Tayyad Sultan (1994)
- Mr Richman and The Shaykh (1995)
- The City of Sokku (1996)
- Meeting in Mecca (1997)

==== The Floating Lotus Magic Puppet Theater ====
- The Mystical Romance of Layla & Majnun (2000)

=== Songs, musical texts, and libretti ===
- Rainforest [commissioned text], an oratorio by Henry Brant (1989)
- Pilgrimage [Memoirs of a Dying Parachutist], chamber piece for baritone and chamber orchestra by Roscoe Mitchell (1995)
- Links [Links], piece for sextet and baritone by Henry Threadgill (1999)
- A Piece of Coal [Piece of Coal], for piano and baritone by Stephen Dickman (2001)
- The Blind Beekeeper [The Blind Beekeeper], setting for piano and baritone by W. A. Mathieu (2003)
- From: A Hundred Little 3D Pictures, for piano and baritone, by J.B. Floyd (2003)
- In Crossing the Busy Street, for piano and baritone, by J.B. Floyd (2009)

=== Commissioned works (poetry/prose) ===
- The Zen Rock Garden, A Way of Seeing with boxed miniature rock garden (Running Press, Philadelphia, 1992)
- Warrior Wisdom (Running Press, Philadelphia, 1993)
- The New York Ramayana —poetry narration (Lotus Music & Dance Studios, New York 2000)
- The Little Box of Zen (Larry Teacher Books, 2001)
- The Eagle Dance: A Tribute to the Mohawk High-Steel Workers —scenario, poetry text, direction and narration (Lotus Music & Dance Studios, New York 2001)

=== Editorial works ===
- The Adam of Two Edens: The Poems of Mahmoud Darwish, as editor of various translators (Jusoor/Syracuse University Press 2001)
- State of Siege by Mahmoud Darwish, editor of the translation by Munir Akash (2004)

=== Anthologized works ===
- Mark in Time: Portraits & Poetry (Glide Publications, San Francisco 1971)
- Contemporaries: 28 New American Poets (The Viking Press 1972)
- San Francisco Oracle (Facsimile Edition 1995)
- Haight Ashbury in the 60's! (CD Rom, Rockument 1996)

=== Works for children ===
- The Story of Noah, illustrations by Malika Moore (Iqra Books, Texas 1979)
- The Cage-bird's Escape, illustrations by the author (Zahra Publications, Texas 1981)
- Sulayman and the Throne of Bilqis, illustrations by Malika Moore (Zahra Publications, 1983)
- Abdallah Jones and the Disappearing-Dust Caper (The Ecstatic Exchange/Crescent Series, 2006)

== Critical mention ==
- Saturday Review of Books, Kenneth Rexroth on American Poetry (1965)
- Rolling Stone, "Floating Lotus" (San Francisco 1969)
- Festival—The Book of American Musical Celebrations, segment on “Floating Lotus Magic Opera Company.“ (Collier Books, New York 1970)
- Mug Shots: Who's Who in the New Earth, article and biography. (Meridian, World Publishing 1972)
- Literary San Francisco, Lawrence Ferlinghetti & Nancy Peters. (City Lights Books/Harper & Row, San Francisco 1980)
- Saudi Gazette, "A Lone Voice," Julia Simpson’s article on the poet. (March 16, 1988)
- Ellipses Magazine, "Return of a Sufi." (Princeton, Vol V No 5 1996-97)
- The Temple, Karl Kempton’s review of The Ramadan Sonnets. (Vol 3 No 3 Summer 1999)

== See also ==
- Nooruddeen Durkee
- Umar Faruq Abd-Allah
- Hamza Yusuf
- List of Sufis
