= Mahesh Sharma (cricketer) =

Indian cricketer

Personal information
- Full name: Mahesh Sharma
- Born: Rajasthan, India
- Batting: Right-handed
- Role: Batsman

Domestic team information
- Years: Team
- 1973–1976: Rajasthan
- First-class debut: 15 December 1973 Rajasthan v Uttar Pradesh
- Last First-class: 18 December 1976 Rajasthan v Madhya Pradesh

Career statistics
Competition	First-class
Matches	9
Runs scored	166
Batting average	12.76
100s/50s	0/0
Top score	45
Catches/stumpings	5/0
- Source: ESPNcricinfo

Mahesh Sharma is an Indian former cricketer who played for Rajasthan.

Sharma played nine first-class matches between 1973 and 1976, scoring 166 runs with a highest score of 45 at an average of 12.76.
