= Rajnikant Trivedi =

Indian cricketer (born 1940)

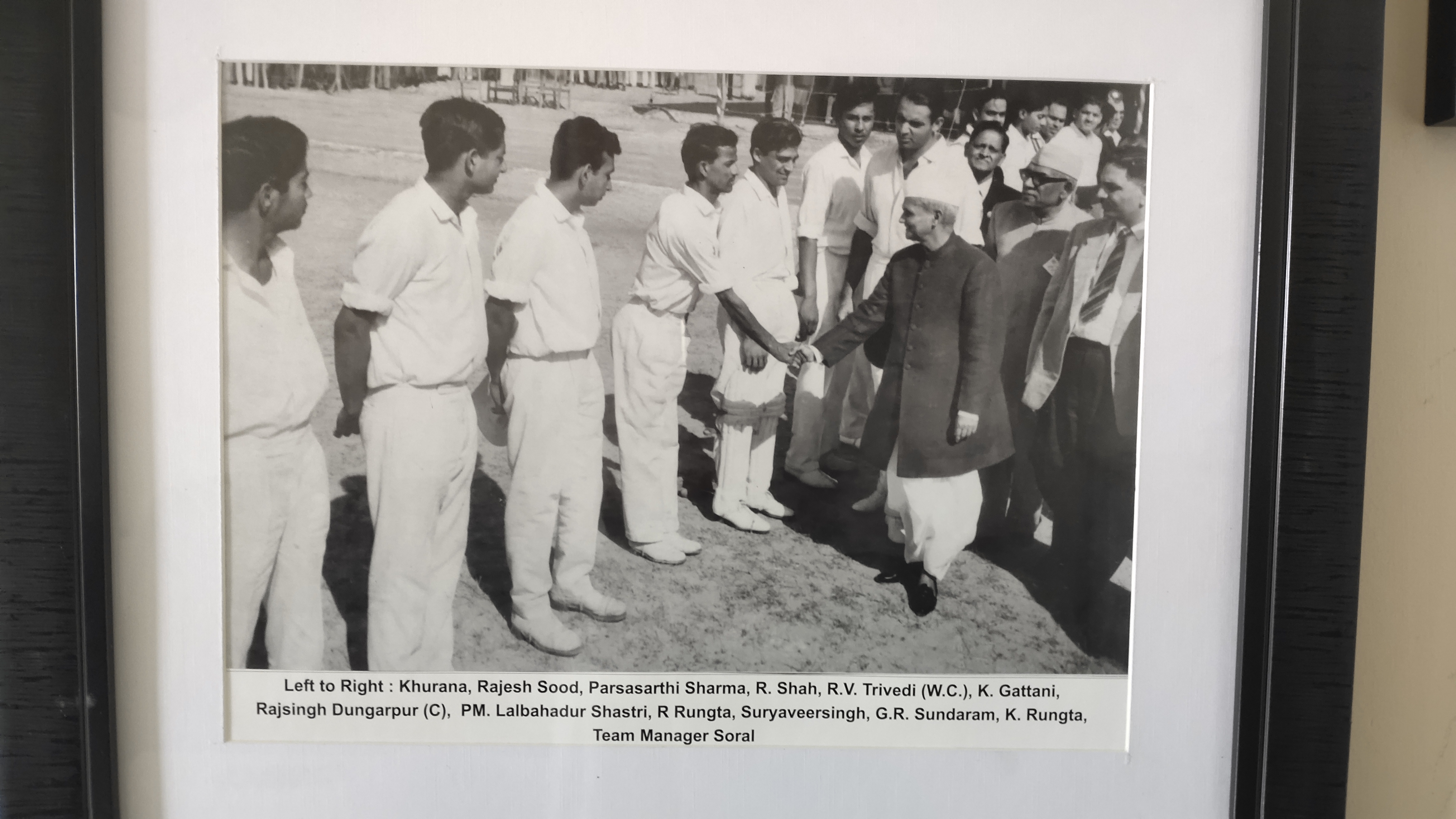

Personal information
- Full name: Rajnikant Vanmalidas Trivedi
- Born: 4 January 1940 (age 86); Botad, India
- Batting: Right-handed
- Role: Wicketkeeper
- Source: ESPNcricinfo, 29 November 2016

Rajnikant Trivedi (born 4 January 1940) is an Indian first-class cricketer who represented Rajasthan. He made his first-class debut for Rajasthan in the 1963-64 Ranji Trophy on 9 November 1963.
