= Aditya Iyer =

Indian journalist and author (born 1985)

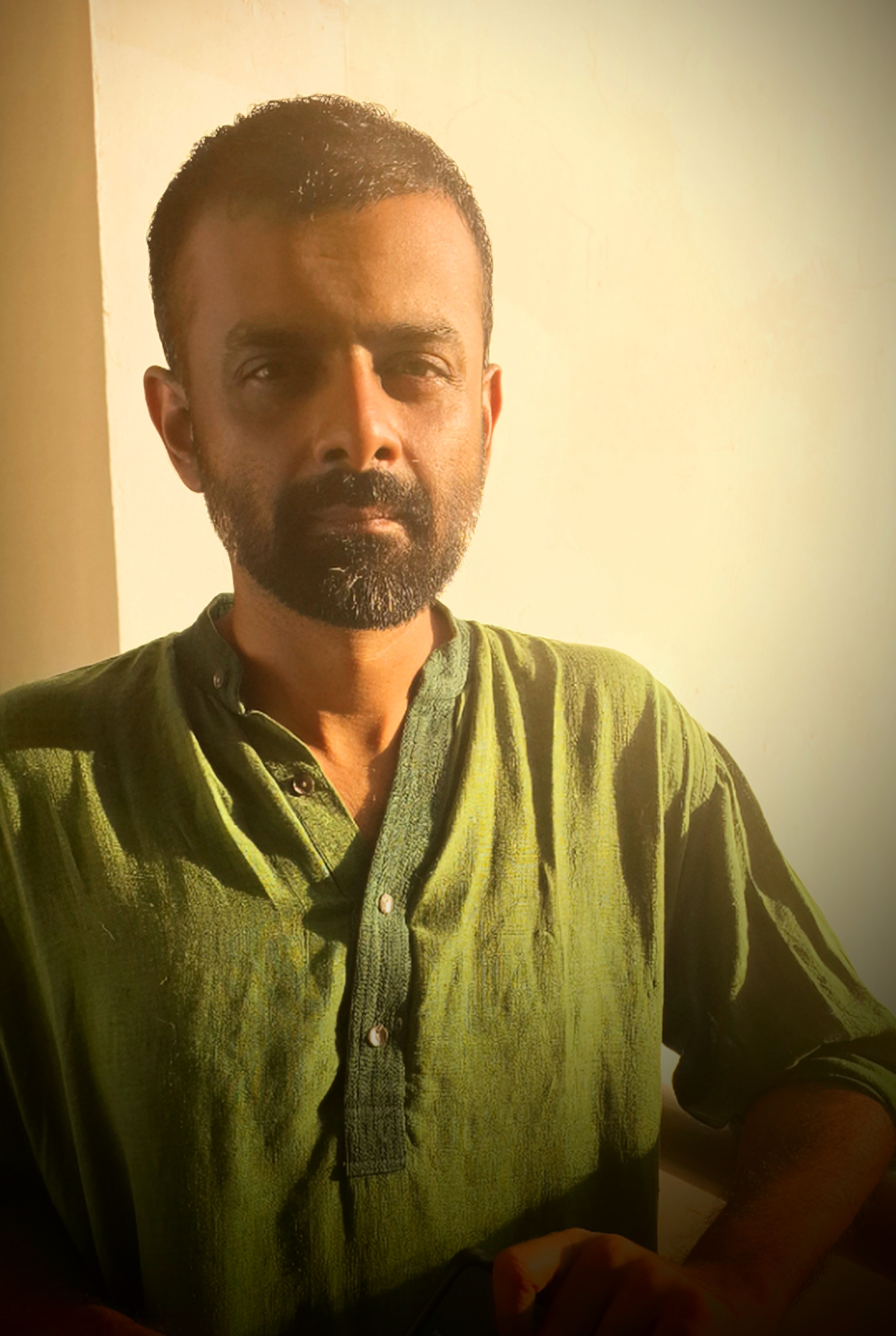
- Iyer in 2024
- Born: 18 May 1985 (age 41)
- Occupations: Journalist, author

Aditya Iyer (born 18 May 1985) is an Indian journalist and author known for long-form narrative reportage. He is the author of Gully Gully: Travels Around India During the 2023 World Cup (2024), published by Penguin Random House.

== Early life and education ==
Iyer was born in Mumbai, India. He studied at Rishi Valley School and later graduated with a Bachelor of Science degree in Physics from St. Xavier's College, Mumbai.

== Career ==
Iyer began his career in 2009 as a sports correspondent with The Indian Express, where he covered cricket, football and tennis, including the ICC Cricket World Cup, the FIFA World Cup and the tennis Grand Slam tournaments.

In 2013, he received the Red Ink Award for Excellence in Journalism (Sports) from the Mumbai Press Club for his feature on Formula One driver Michael Schumacher, Quietly Fades the Don.

In 2016, he joined Open Magazine and shifted toward long-form narrative journalism. His reporting expanded beyond sport into character-led features and immersive on-ground writing. His work has included reporting from the Maasai Mara in Kenya, the Kumbh Mela, post-war Jaffna in northern Sri Lanka, and Kota, Rajasthan, where he wrote on student suicides in India's coaching-hub culture.

He later joined the Hindustan Times as Chief Cricket Writer before returning to Open Magazine.

== Books ==
Gully Gully: Travels Around India During the 2023 World Cup (Penguin Random House, 2024) traces the landscapes, cities and cultures surrounding cricket in India through reportage and travel writing.

The book was reviewed by several Indian publications, including The Telegraph, The Financial Express, Deccan Herald, and The Indian Express.

- The Indian Express wrote that Gully Gully “strikes this rare emotional connection,” noting that Iyer’s narrative voice connects the cities that hosted the 2023 Cricket World Cup to the sport itself, “transforming sportswriting into literature that is both serious and delightful.”
- The Financial Express described the book as “a brilliant book for cricket lovers, written with style and gay abandon,” highlighting how its travelogue format “makes the journey as exhilarating as the matches themselves.”
- The Telegraph (India) said the book “reignites the fervour and passion that gripped every corner of cricket-mad India,” and praised Iyer’s insightful exploration of “the gullies” where the game lives alongside India’s history, culture and politics.
- Deccan Herald noted “there is pathos to be dealt with but this is a book that largely celebrates cricket and its Indian beating heart, and also doubles up as an excellent travelogue."
- The Hindu observed that Gully Gully uses its narrative to convey the "sweeping atmosphere of a nation gripped by the tournament" and the places it touched.

The book received a Special Jury Award at the Ekamra Sports Literature Festival.

== Awards ==
- Red Ink Award for Excellence in Journalism (Sports), Mumbai Press Club (2013)
- Special Jury Award, Ekamra Sports Literature Festival
