= Nazmul Hussain =

Indian cricketer (born 1948)

Personal information
- Full name: Nazmul Hussain
- Born: 4 July 1948 (age 78); Udaipur, India
- Batting: Right-handed
- Source: ESPNcricinfo, 30 November 2016

Nazmul Hussain (born 4 July 1948) is an Indian first-class cricketer who represented Rajasthan. He made his first-class debut for Rajasthan in the 1968-69 Ranji Trophy on 6 December 1968.
