= Sanajay Vyas =

Indian cricketer (born 1961)

Personal information
- Full name: Sanajay Mohanlal Vyas
- Born: 14 October 1961 (age 65); Jaipur, India
- Batting: Right-handed
- Source: ESPNcricinfo, 30 November 2016

Sanajay Vyas (born 14 October 1961) is an Indian first-class cricketer who represented Rajasthan. He made his first-class debut for Rajasthan in the 1979-80 Ranji Trophy on 14 March 1980.
