= Rakesh Tandon =

Indian cricketer

Personal information
- Full name: Rakesh Prithviraj Tandon
- Born: 27 February 1953 (age 73); Bangalore, India
- Batting: Right-handed
- Bowling: Right-arm leg-spin

Domestic team information
- Years: Team
- 1969-70 to 1971-72: Vidarbha
- 1971-72: Central Zone
- 1972-73 to 1977-78: Bombay
- 1975-76: West Zone

Career statistics
Competition	First-class
Matches	50
Runs scored	1202
Batting average	24.53
100s/50s	2/5
Top score	142*
Balls bowled	6252
Wickets	108
Bowling average	28.62
5 wickets in innings	2
10 wickets in match	–
Best bowling	6/34
Catches/stumpings	44/–
- Source: Cricinfo, 23 December 2017

Rakesh Prithviraj Tandon (born 27 February 1953) is a former cricketer who played first-class cricket in India from 1969 to 1977.

Rakesh Tandon was a leg-spin bowler, lower-order batsman and fine close-in fielder. His best bowling figures were 6 for 34 for Central Zone against North Zone in the Duleep Trophy in 1971-72, when he and Salim Durani dismissed North Zone for 85. His highest score was 142 not out for Bombay against Baroda in the Ranji Trophy in 1976-77. He played in two matches for India against the visiting Sri Lankan team in 1975-76 in the days before Sri Lanka achieved Test status.
