= Suryaveer Singh =

Indian cricketer

Personal information
- Born: 23 December 1936; Banswara, Rajasthan, British India
- Died: 6 August 2002 (aged 65); Himmatnagar, Gujarat, India
- Batting: Right-handed
- Bowling: Right-arm offbreak
- Role: Batsman, wicket-keeper

Career statistics
Competition	First-class
Matches	81
Runs scored	4,006
Batting average	32.30
100s/50s	8/17
Top score	184*
Balls bowled	558
Wickets	5
Bowling average	47.80
5 wickets in innings	0
10 wickets in match	0
Best bowling	2/19
Catches/stumpings	93/16
- Source: CricketArchive, 20 November 2022

Suryaveer Singh (23 December 1936 – 6 August 2002) was an Indian first-class cricketer. His brother Hanumant Singh, cousin Kumar Indrajitsinhji, uncle Kumar Shri Duleepsinhji and great uncle Kumar Shri Ranjitsinhji, all played Test cricket. An opening batsman and wicketkeeper, he succeeded as Maharawal of Banswara in April 1985.

Suryaveer Singh made his first class debut for Madhya Pradesh in 1958-59. The following season he joined his brother Hanumant in the Rajasthan team with whom he became a regular throughout the 1960s. Rajasthan made the Ranji Trophy final seven times with Suryaveer in the team, although they lost all of them to Bombay. The 1966-67 final in particular was memorable for Singh as he contributed innings of 79 and 132, many of the runs coming in partnership with his brother who scored 109 and 213 not out.

At the age of 65 he was killed along with his daughter and two sisters in a car accident.
