= Kishan Rungta =

Indian cricketer and cricket team selector (1932–2021)

Personal information
- Full name: Kishan Mahabirprasad Rungta
- Born: 3 September 1932; Bagar, Rajasthan, India
- Died: 1 May 2021 (aged 88); Jaipur, Rajasthan
- Batting: Right-handed
- Bowling: Right-arm medium

Domestic team information
- Years: Team
- 1953–1954: Maharashtra
- 1956–1970: Rajasthan

Career statistics
Competition	First-class
Matches	59
Runs scored	2,717
Batting average	32.73
100s/50s	5/15
Top score	130
Balls bowled	303
Wickets	9
Bowling average	20.22
5 wickets in innings	1
10 wickets in match	0
Best bowling	5/14
Catches/stumpings	47/0
- Source: ESPNcricinfo, 8 October 2022

Kishan Mahabirprasad Rungta (3 September 1932 – 1 May 2021) was an Indian cricketer and administrator.

== Life ==
Rungta played first-class cricket for Maharashtra and Rajasthan from 1953 to 1970. He served as the Indian national cricket selector from March 1998 to September 1998. His elder brother Purushotham went onto serve as BCCI treasurer in 1970s.

== Death ==
Kishan died due to COVID-19 at the age of 88. He was hospitalized in Jaipur after being tested positive for COVID-19.
