= P. Krishnakumar =

Indian cricketer (born 1974)

Cricket information
- Batting: Left-handed
- Bowling: Left-arm fast medium

Career statistics
Competition	First-class	List A
Matches	70	51
Runs scored	2,952	786
Batting average	30.75	20.68
100s/50s	5/16	0/2
Top score	208*	84
Balls bowled	10,165	2,044
Wickets	165	39
Bowling average	31.92	41.07
5 wickets in innings	7	0
10 wickets in match	1	0
Best bowling	6/63	3/33
Catches/stumpings	21/–	6/–
- Source: ESPNcricinfo, 17 December 2014

Pudiyangum Kesavadasan Krishna kumar, known as P Krishna kumar, (born 1 January 1974) plays for the Rajasthan cricket team in domestic cricket.

Krishnakumar played first-class cricket for Rajasthan Ranji team for sixteen years, five as captain.

== Awards and honour ==
- Awarded "Best Cricketer of Rajasthan" award from Sir Mathura Das Mathur Trust, Rajasthan in 1995.
