= Saleh Abdel Hai =

Egyptian singer (1896–1962)

- Born: August 16, 1896; Cairo
- Died: March 5, 1962 (aged 65)
- Occupations: Singer; Composer

Saleh Abdel Hai (1896–1962) (Arabic: صالح عبد الحي) was an Egyptian singer.

Saleh Abdel Hai was born in 1896 at Darb Hanafi lane, Cairo, Egypt. He grew up in an environment of art, and schooled at the hands of Mohammad Omar, a player of Kanun in the choir of Yusuf Almnilaoi and Abdalehi Helmi. He sang the (Mawal) through it; he had strong voice, was to sing before the appearance of radio broadcast in open and closed areas.

Abdel Hai belonged to the so-called Sahbageya; the company applauds the night concerts in Cairo. A famous distinction classic (Tarab) singer, sang the old type of oriental music. He contributed to the musical theatre with Mounira El Mahdeya and musician Mohamed Abdel Wahab, in 1929 he cratered his Owen musical theatre. Zakaria Ahmed, Mohamed El Qasabgi wrote several songs for him.

Abdel Hai did not marry or have children, he died in 1962.
