= Shamsher Singh (cricketer, born 1972) =

Indian cricketer

Personal information
- Born: 16 October 1972; Hisar, Haryana, India
- Died: 21 March 2013 (aged 40); Jaipur, Rajasthan, India
- Nickname: Bobby
- Batting: Right-handed
- Bowling: Right-arm medium-fast
- Role: Bowler

Domestic team information
- Years: Team
- 1992/93–2001/02: Rajasthan

Career statistics
Competition	FC	List A
Matches	33	26
Runs scored	149	49
Batting average	5.73	8.16
100s/50s	0/0	0/0
Top score	18*	18
Balls bowled	4,506	1,158
Wickets	55	35
Bowling average	35.45	22.65
5 wickets in innings	2	1
10 wickets in match	0	n/a
Best bowling	5/72	5/26
Catches/stumpings	10/–	2/–
- Source: ESPNcricinfo, 17 May 2016

Shamsher Singh (16 October 1972 – 21 March 2013) was an Indian first-class cricketer who represented Rajasthan.

== Life and career ==
Born on 16 October 1972 at Hisar, Singh moved to Rajasthan during his childhood. He appeared in 33 first-class and 26 List A matches for Rajasthan as a right-arm medium fast bowler. He made his first-class debut in 1992 at the age of 20. He went on to take 55 first-class wickets at an average of 35.45 and 35 List A wickets at 22.65. His last first-class appearance came in January 2002 at the age of 29.

After his playing career, Singh became a selector for the Rajasthan Cricket Association. He worked as the team manager of Rajasthan Royals during 2008 Indian Premier League and also as the manager of Central Zone. He started a cricket academy in Jaipur and is said to have convinced RCA to appoint Meyrick Pringle as the fast bowling coach of Rajasthan in 2011 after which Rajasthan successfully defended their Ranji title. Regarding Singh, Pringle said, "Whenever he spoke cricket, you wanted to actually listen. What he achieved at the first-class level he wanted to give back to Indian cricket through his academy."

Singh died of a heart attack on 21 March 2013 in Jaipur.

== Family ==
Shamsher Singh has a wife Priyanka Singh( formerly Sehrawat) and two daughters Mahika Singh and Lakeesha Singh.
