= Rajiv Rathore (Rajasthan cricketer) =

Indian cricketer (born 1968)

Personal information
- Full name: Rajiv Pratapsingh Rathore
- Born: 20 May 1968 (age 58); Jodhpur, India
- Batting: Right-handed
- Bowling: Right-arm medium
- Source: ESPNcricinfo, 29 November 2016

Rajiv Rathore (born 20 May 1968) is an Indian first-class cricketer who represented Rajasthan. He made his first-class debut for Rajasthan in the 1985-86 Ranji Trophy on 20 December 1985.
