= Ramaswamy Prasanna =

Indian cricketer (born 1982)

Personal information
- Born: 7 April 1982 (age 44); Chennai, India
- Source: Cricinfo, 10 October 2015

Ramaswamy Prasanna (born 7 April 1982) is an Indian first-class cricketer who plays for Tamil Nadu.
