= Aniruddha Joshi =

Indian cricketer (born 1987)

Personal information
- Born: 7 November 1987 (age 38); Bangalore, Karnataka, India
- Batting: Right-handed
- Bowling: Right-arm offbreak
- Role: All rounder

Domestic team information
- Years: Team
- 2011/12–2021/22: Karnataka
- Source: ESPNcricinfo, 30 January 2017

Aniruddha Joshi (born 7 November 1987) is an Indian cricketer. He made his List A debut for Karnataka in the 2015–16 Vijay Hazare Trophy on 10 December 2015. In January 2018, he was bought by the Royal Challengers Bangalore in the 2018 IPL auction. In the 2020 IPL auction, he was bought by the Rajasthan Royals ahead of the 2020 Indian Premier League.
