= V. S. Vijay Kumar =

Indian cricketer (1944–2019)

Personal information
- Full name: Vijalapur Seshadri Vijay Kumar
- Born: 28 April 1946; Bangalore, Karnataka, India
- Died: 31 May 2019 (aged 73)
- Batting: Right-handed
- Bowling: Right-arm medium
- Role: Opening batsman

Domestic team information
- Years: Team
- 1967/68—1974/75: Karnataka

Career statistics
Competition	First-class	List A
Matches	57	3
Runs scored	2,891	52
Batting average	31.42	17.33
100s/50s	2/16	0/0
Top score	158	38
Balls bowled	3,596	72
Wickets	46	1
Bowling average	36.73	28.00
5 wickets in innings	0	0
10 wickets in match	0	0
Best bowling	4/9	1/28
Catches/stumpings	21/—	0/—
- Source: CricketArchive, 7 February 2021

Vijalapur Seshadri Vijay Kumar, usually known as V. S. Vijay Kumar, (born 28 April 1946 - died 31 May 2019) was an Indian cricketer who played for Karnataka. In his nine-year career as a right-handed opening batsman, he appeared in 57 first class matches and scored nearly 3000 runs.
