= Afroz Khan =

Indian cricketer (born 1984)

Personal information
- Born: 17 July 1984 (age 42); Jhalawar, Rajasthan, India
- Batting: Right-handed
- Source: ESPNcricinfo, 30 November 2016

Afroz Khan (born 17 July 1984) is an Indian first-class cricketer who represented Rajasthan. He made his first-class debut for Rajasthan in the 2002–03 Ranji Trophy on 19 December 2002.
