= C. G. Joshi =

Former Indian cricketer

Personal information
- Full name: Chandrasekhar Ganesh Joshi
- Born: 30 August 1931 (age 95); Bombay, British India
- Batting: Right-handed
- Bowling: Leg break and googly

Domestic team information
- Years: Team
- 1951/52–1955/56: Baroda
- 1957/58–1977/78: Rajasthan

Career statistics
Competition	First-class
Matches	95 (Note: Cricinfo credits Joshi with an additional match that he took four wickets in, as does an article in Mid-Day. It is missing from CricketArchive's list of his matches, both first-class and other matches.)
Runs scored	1,140
Batting average	12.95
100s/50s	1/2
Top score	104
Balls bowled	16,757
Wickets	288
Bowling average	25.81
5 wickets in innings	11
10 wickets in match	1
Best bowling	6/39
Catches/stumpings	89/–
- Source: CricketArchive, 18 February 2025

Chandrasekhar Ganesh Joshi (born 30 August 1931) is a retired Indian cricketer. He had a long first-class cricket career from the 1951–52 season to 1977–78, originally with Baroda and later with Rajasthan for 20 seasons. Joshi was a right-handed batter and showed promise in that role with Baroda; with Rajasthan, however, he had greater success as a bowler who specialized in leg breaks and googlies. Indian Cricket named him one of their cricketers of the year in 1966. During his career, he was also a sculptor and was in charge of the fine arts department at Mayo College.

== Early life ==
Joshi was born in Bombay on 30 August 1931. In the early 1950s, he attended the University of Baroda, with whom he appeared in four matches of the Rohinton Baria Trophy during his time there.

== Career with Baroda ==
While still at university, Baroda's senior cricket team included Joshi in their starting eleven for his debut match in a Ranji Trophy fixture against Maharashtra on 16 November 1951. His 30 runs led Baroda's first innings, where they were out for 111, and he added 36 in their second. In between, he took his first wicket during Maharashtra's first innings, catching and bowling R. G. Bhadbhade, and added a second later in the match, clean bowling Maharashtra's captain, Madhusudan Rege, during their second innings.

The following season, with Baroda taking on Gujarat in the Ranji Trophy, Joshi scored both his first century (104 runs in the first innings) and first half-century (an unbeaten 56 in the second innings). These proved to be his two highest scores as a first-class cricketer. (Note: The only other half-century Joshi would record would be in 1962, when he scored 52 runs in an innings.)

He appeared in all four matches of Baroda's run to the Ranji Trophy's semi-finals in the 1954/55 season. Despite a poor year as a batter, where he only managed 35 runs in four innings, he began showing promise as a bowler, taking nine wickets to lead Baroda that season; this included a six-wicket haul against Maharashtra. Following a single match for Baroda during the next season, Joshi took time away from cricket to take a scholarship in Italy.

== Career with Rajasthan ==
Over two years after his last match with Baroda, Joshi returned to Indian cricket, this time with Rajasthan. Unlike at Baroda, where batting was a primary focus of his, Joshi focused on his leg break deliveries and his googly as a member of Rajasthan. He debuted with the side in the 1957/58 Ranji Trophy, starting a tenure as a first-class cricketer with the club that would last until 1977.

Joshi's first year with Rajasthan saw him lead the team with 15 wickets. Before the 1958/59 season, he was chosen to represent the Central Zone in a match featuring the touring West Indians, taking Conrad Hunte's wicket in both innings in the process. After another season of 15 wickets in 1959/60, Joshi was limited to seven matches over the next three years, with a combined ten wickets in those seasons; during the 1961-62 season, however, he did manage his only half-century with Rajasthan.

A return to form started in the 1963/64 season, where he took at least ten wickets in a year over eight of the next nine seasons. Joshi reached his peak bowling totals in 1965/66, when he took a career-best 30 wickets at an average of 23.86. For his efforts in that season, the 1966 Indian Cricket annual named him one of their five cricketers of the year.

Joshi appeared in his only Irani Cup match in 1968, when he was called to the Rest of India squad to replace an injured Vaman Kumar. In the match, he took a five-wicket haul in the first innings against defending Ranji Trophy champion Bombay, en route to his side winning by over 100 runs. Continuing to be one of Rajasthan's most useful bowlers, he recorded his lowest season average to that point in the 1971/72 season, with 21 wickets at a 17.19 average.

During a quarter-final defeat against Delhi in the 1974/75 season, the now-44-year-old Joshi recorded his best bowling totals in both a single innings and match when he took six wickets for 39 runs in the first innings and took 4 for 34 in the second for his only career occurrence of recording ten wickets in a match. Overall, he recorded 19 wickets in his three matches of that season at an average of 9.31, the lowest of any Indian cricketer that season with a minimum of 15 wickets taken. He ended his career with three matches in the 1975/76 season and, after not appearing the following year, two matches in the 1977/78 campaign. Overall, he ended his Rajasthan stint with 228 wickets, 654 runs, and 67 catches in 69 matches with the club.

== Personal life ==
Joshi has two children, a boy and a girl, from a marriage that ended in 2022 when his wife died from COVID-19.

During his time on the Rajasthan cricket team, Joshi was also in charge of the fine arts department at Ajmer's Mayo College. Additionally, he has a career as a sculptor; in 2024, Mid-Day columnist Clayton Murzello commented on him being "award-winning" in that field.
