= Abdul Hai (Hyderabad cricketer) =

Indian cricketer

Personal information
- Full name: Mohammad Abdul Hai

Career statistics
Competition	First-class	List A
Matches	72	11
Runs scored	3215	469
Batting average	34.56	42.63
100s/50s	4/14	1/3
Top score	217*	101
Balls bowled	1625	150
Wickets	18	3
Bowling average	38.44	36
5 wickets in innings	0	0
10 wickets in match	0	0
Best bowling	4/33	2/46
Catches/stumpings	59/0	4/0
- Source: CricketArchive, 9 March 2017

Abdul Hai is an Indian cricketer, who played for Hyderabad among others in first-class and List A cricket.

He played for both Hyderabad and Uttar Pradesh teams.
