= Robin Bist =

Indian cricketer (born 1987)

Personal information
- Full name: Robin Bist
- Born: 2 November 1987 (age 39); Delhi, India
- Batting: Right-handed
- Bowling: Right-arm off-break
- Role: Opening Batsman

Domestic team information
- Years: Team
- 2006/07-2014/15: Rajasthan
- 2015/16-2016/17: Himachal Pradesh
- 2017: Victoria Sporting Club
- 2017/18-2019/20: Rajasthan
- 2020/21: Sikkim
- 2021/22: Uttarakhand

Career statistics
Competition	FC	LA	T20
Matches	104	56	38
Runs scored	6,810	1,638	476
Batting average	46.01	34.12	15.86
100s/50s	15/34	2/11	0/0
Top score	220*	120	46
Balls bowled	483	59	60
Wickets	7	1	5
Bowling average	108.00	77.00	14.80
5 wickets in innings	0	0	0
10 wickets in match	0	0	0
Best bowling	1/4	1/46	2/19
Catches/stumpings	48/–	26/–	7/-
- Source: ESPNcricinfo, 14 November 2021

Robin Bist (born 2 November 1987) is an Indian former cricketer who played for Rajasthan, Himachal Pradesh and Uttarakhand in domestic cricket. He was a right-hand batsman and an off-break bowler. He was part of Delhi Daredevils squad in the Indian Premier League.

Bist was the leading run-scorer of Ranji Trophy 2011–12, where he scored 1034 runs from 16 innings at a whopping average of 86.16 including four centuries. His performances helped him get an IPL contract with the Delhi Daredevils. In November 2012 Robin Bist was released by Delhi Daredevils.

In August 2015, he moved to Himachal Pradesh for 2015–16 Ranji Trophy for two years after Rajasthan Cricket Association were suspended by the BCCI in May 2015. For the Ranji trophy 2017–18 he returned to Rajasthan.

In November 2018, he scored his 6,000th run in first-class cricket, batting for Rajasthan against Jammu & Kashmir in the 2018–19 Ranji Trophy. He was the leading run-scorer for Rajasthan in the group-stage of the 2018–19 Ranji Trophy, with 684 runs in nine matches. He finished the tournament with 741 runs in ten matches.
