= Anshu Jain (cricketer) =

Indian cricketer (born 1979)

Personal information
- Full name: Anshu Shailendrakumar Jain
- Born: 15 November 1979 (age 46); Jaipur, India
- Batting: Right-handed
- Source: ESPNcricinfo, 30 November 2016

Anshu Jain (born 15 November 1979) is an Indian first-class cricketer who represented Rajasthan. He made his first-class debut for Rajasthan in the 1996-97 Ranji Trophy on 16 December 1996.
