= Parthasarathy Sharma =

Indian cricketer (1948–2010)

Parthasarthy Sharma
Personal information
- Full name: Parthasarathy Harishchandra Sharma
- Born: 5 January 1948; Alwar, Rajasthan, India
- Died: 20 October 2010 (aged 62)
- Batting: Right-handed
- Bowling: Right-arm medium

International information
- National side: India
- Test debut (cap 134): 11 December 1974 v West Indies
- Last Test: 1 January 1977 v England
- ODI debut (cap 18): 21 February 1976 v New Zealand
- Last ODI: 22 February 1976 v New Zealand

Career statistics
| Competition | Test | ODI | FC | LA |
|---|---|---|---|---|
| Matches | 5 | 2 | 152 | 17 |
| Runs scored | 187 | 20 | 8,614 | 632 |
| Batting average | 18.69 | 10.00 | 39.15 | 45.14 |
| 100s/50s | 0/1 | 0/0 | 18/45 | 3/1 |
| Top score | 54 | 14 | 206 | 110* |
| Balls bowled | 24 | – | 12,621 | 684 |
| Wickets | – | – | 191 | 13 |
| Bowling average | – | – | 24.51 | 32.61 |
| 5 wickets in innings | – | – | 6 | 1 |
| 10 wickets in match | – | – | 1 | 0 |
| Best bowling | – | – | 6/26 | 6/29 |
| Catches/stumpings | 1/– | 0/– | 145/2 | 5/– |
- Source: Cricinfo, 20 March 2014

Parthasarathy Harishchandra Sharma (5 January 1948 – 20 October 2010) was an Indian cricketer.

Sharma was born in Alwar, Rajasthan and played in five Test matches and two One Day Internationals from 1974 to 1977. He played first-class cricket for Rajasthan in the Ranji Trophy from 1962 to 1963 (when he made his debut a few days before his 15th birthday) to 1984–85. In the beginning of his career he kept wickets too, but later gave up keeping and became an off spinner. He was a master of playing spin bowling and people compared him to Vijay Manjrekar the way he handled the turning ball.

In 1977–78 he captained Rest of India to an innings victory over Bombay in the Irani Cup, scoring 206, his highest score, and taking four wickets. His best bowling figures came against Vidarbha in 1974–75, when he took the first six wickets in the second innings to finish with 6 for 26, then hit the highest score of the match, 54 not out, to give Rajasthan victory by eight wickets.
