= Kailash Gattani =

Indian cricketer (born 1947)

Personal information
- Full name: Kailash Ramniwas Gattani
- Born: 4 March 1947 (age 79); Pali, Rajasthan, India
- Batting: Right-handed
- Bowling: Right-arm medium-fast
- Role: Bowler

Domestic team information
- Years: Team
- 1962/63–1982/83: Rajasthan

Career statistics
| Competition | FC | List A |
|---|---|---|
| Matches | 109 | 6 |
| Runs scored | 1,860 | 18 |
| Batting average | 16.46 | 4.50 |
| 100s/50s | 1/2 | 0/0 |
| Top score | 100 | 9 |
| Balls bowled | 20,531 | 306 |
| Wickets | 396 | 7 |
| Bowling average | 19.91 | 21.71 |
| 5 wickets in innings | 20 | 0 |
| 10 wickets in match | 6 | n/a |
| Best bowling | 7/13 | 2/14 |
| Catches/stumpings | 38/– | 0/– |
- Source: ESPNcricinfo, 4 January 2016

Kailash Ramniwas Gattani (born 4 March 1947) is a former Indian first-class cricketer who played for Rajasthan from 1962/63 to 1982/83. A right-arm medium-fast bowler, he captained the team during 1976/77–1978/79. He started his own club and trained young cricketers after his retirement.

== Life and career ==
Kailash Gattani was born in Pali, Rajasthan, but grew up in the Churchgate area in Bombay and studied at the St. Xavier's College. Gattani was studying in Bharda High School when he was first spotted as a 15-year old by Vinoo Mankad. Gattani impressed with his leg cutters at the Rajasthan team nets, and was selected in the state team.

He made his first-class debut for Rajasthan in November 1962, but it wasn't until the late 1960s that he caught national attention. He was the leading wicket-taker of the 1969–70 Ranji Trophy in which Rajasthan finished runners-up. He ended the 1969/70 season with 51 first-class wickets at an average of 15.39. He had become a regular for Central Zone in Duleep Trophy, but was not considered for India selection. In 1976/77 he became the captain of Rajasthan and led them until the 1978/79 season. He retired after the 1982/83 Ranji season, finishing with 396 first-class wickets at an average of 19.91.

Gattani established the Star Cricket Club which trained talented young cricketers and took them on annual cricket tours of England from 1987 to 2004. Among the youngsters who played for the club are Sachin Tendulkar at 15, Rahul Dravid at 17, Vinod Kambli, Sourav Ganguly and Ajay Jadeja.
