= 2006–07 Ranji Trophy =

- The Ranji Trophy, which the winners get.
- Administrator: BCCI
- Cricket format: First-class cricket
- Tournament format(s): League and knockout
- Champions: Mumbai (37th title)
- Participants: 27
- Most runs: Robin Uthappa (Karnataka) (854)
- Most wickets: Ranadeb Bose (Bengal) (57)

The 2006–07 Ranji Trophy was the 73rd season of the Ranji Trophy. Mumbai defeated Bengal by 132 runs in the final.

== Scorecards and averages ==
- CricketArchive

== Group Matches ==
=== Super League ===
Group A

Team	Played	W	L	Tied	Drawn	NR	Points
Baroda	7	4	1	0	2	0	17
Karnataka	7	3	1	0	3	0	17
Delhi	7	1	1	0	5	0	13
Andhra Pradesh	7	2	1	0	4	0	12
Saurashtra	7	2	2	0	3	0	9
Uttar Pradesh	7	1	3	0	3	0	9
Tamil Nadu	7	1	1	0	5	0	8
Haryana	7	1	5	0	1	0	7

- Baroda and Karnataka qualified for the knockout stage.

Group B

Team	Played	W	L	Tied	Drawn	NR	Points
Bengal	6	3	0	0	3	0	17
Mumbai	6	3	1	0	2	0	15
Hyderabad	6	2	1	0	3	0	12
Punjab	6	0	2	0	4	0	8
Maharashtra	6	1	1	0	4	0	7
Rajasthan	6	1	3	0	2	0	4
Gujarat	6	0	2	0	4	0	4

- Bengal and Mumbai qualified for the knockout stage.

== Knockout Matches ==
=== Semifinal 1 ===
23–27 January 2007
Scorecard

Karnataka	v	Bengal
89 (38.5 overs); Thilak Naidu 33 (57); Ranadeb Bose 6/38 (16.5 overs)		238 (100.1 overs); Arindam Das 88 (204); Srinivasa Dhananjaya 3/45 (18 overs)
455 (168.5 overs); Bharat Chipli 95 (138); Sourav Sarkar 4/87 (38 overs)		307/4 (118 overs); Manoj Tiwary 151* (268); Balachandra Akhil 2/75 (26.4 overs)

Bengal won by 6 wickets
Eden Gardens, Kolkata
Umpires: Sanjeeva Rao and Shashank Ranade

- Karnataka won the toss and elected to bat.
- Bengal qualified for the Ranji Trophy final

=== Semifinal 2 ===
23–27 January 2007
Scorecard

Mumbai	v	Baroda
233 (79.5 overs); Amol Mazumdar 97 (208); Irfan Pathan 3/49 (22.5 overs)		142 (32.1 overs); Yusuf Pathan 70 (72); Wilkin Mota 3/15 (6 overs)
145 (59.1 overs); Vinayak Samant 66 (136); Rakesh Patel 4/34 (19 overs)		173 (51.3 overs); Irfan Pathan 27 (57); Wilkin Mota 3/36 (14.3 overs)

Mumbai won by 63 runs
Moti Bagh Stadium, Vadodra
Umpires: Sankara Dendapani and Shavir Tarapore

- Baroda won the toss and elected to field.
- Mumbai qualified for the Ranji Trophy final

=== Final ===
2–5 February 2007
Scorecard

Mumbai	v	Bengal
320 (98.4 overs); Wasim Jaffer 112 (243); Ranadeb Bose 4/77 (29 overs)		143 (32.1 overs); Manoj Tiwary 42 (43); Zaheer Khan 5/40 (11 overs)
294 (80.3 overs); Rohit Sharma 57 (85); Ranadeb Bose 5/71 (26.3 overs)		339 (92.2 overs); Manoj Tiwary 94 (171); Zaheer Khan 4/119 (24 overs)

Mumbai won by 132 runs
Wankhede Stadium, Mumbai
Umpires: GA Pratapkumar and Krishna Hariharan

- Bengal won the toss and elected to field.
