= Hanumant Singh =

Indian cricketer

- Singh in 2000

Personal information
- Born: 29 March 1939; Banswara, Rajputana, British India
- Died: 29 November 2006 (aged 67); Mumbai, Maharashtra, India
- Batting: Right-handed
- Bowling: Leg spin

International information
- National side: India
- Test debut (cap 108): 8 February 1964 v England
- Last Test: 25 September 1969 v New Zealand

Domestic team information
- Years: Team
- Rajasthan

Career statistics
Competition	Test	First-class
Matches	14	207
Runs scored	686	12,338
Batting average	31.18	43.90
100s/50s	1/5	29/63
Top score	105	213*
Balls bowled	66	3,934
Wickets	0	56
Bowling average	–	40.94
5 wickets in innings	–	1
10 wickets in match	–	0
Best bowling	–	5/48
Catches/stumpings	11/–	110/–
- Source: ESPNcricinfo, 16 March 2017

Hanumant Singh (29 March 1939 – 29 November 2006) was an Indian cricketer. He played in 14 Test matches for the Indian cricket team from 1964 to 1969. He was later an International Cricket Council match referee in 9 Tests and 54 One Day Internationals from 1995 to 2002.

== Personal life ==
Singh was born in Banswara, Rajputana in a Rajput family. He was the second son of Chandraveer Singh, Maharawal of Banswara from 1944 to 1985, making him Maharajkumar of Banswara. His mother was the sister of Kumar Shri Duleepsinhji, making him the grandnephew of Kumar Shri Ranjitsinhji. His older brother, Suryaveer Singh, also played first-class cricket, while his son, Sangram Singh represented the Mumbai U-16 team. A cousin, KS Indrajitsinhji, also played in 4 Tests for India. He was initially educated at Welham Boys' School in Dehradun. Later he completed his education at Daly College, Indore. He has a cricket ground named after him at Daly College, Hanumant Oval. He was a member of the Madhya Bharat cricket team.

== Playing career ==
Hanumant Singh played domestic first-class cricket for Madhya Bharat and then Rajasthan and Central Zone, and was known as "Chhotu" on account of his short stature. He batted well off the back foot, particularly working the ball on the leg side.

He made his Test debut in the 4th Test against England at Delhi in February 1964, scoring 105 and so becoming the fifth Indian to make a Test century on debut, emulating Lala Amarnath, Deepak Shodhan, A. G. Kripal Singh and Abbas Ali Baig. Later that year, he reached 94 in his first Test against Australia, out of a total of 193.

He also played at home against New Zealand in 1964–65 and against West Indies in 1966–67, and toured England in 1967. However, like many other prominent Indian players, he was surprisingly excluded from the 1967–68 tour to Australia. Recalled to play against New Zealand at Bombay in September 1969, he scored 1 and 13, caught behind both times off the fast bowling of Dayle Hadlee, and did not play Test cricket again. He never scored another test century.

He was captain of Rajasthan in three Ranji Trophy finals, but lost each time. He also captained Central Zone to its first victory in the Duleep Trophy in 1971–72. In the Ranji Trophy final in 1966–67, he scored 109 and 213* against Bombay. His older brother, Suryaveer Singh, made 79 and 132 in the same match, and they shared partnerships of 176 and 213. Hanumant Singh retired from first-class cricket in 1979.

== Coaching career ==
He was manager of the Indian team that toured the West Indies in 1983 and was of Rajasthan cricket team as well as head coach of Kenya cricket team in early 1990. He coached them to a 1990 ICC Trophy in Netherlands as they lost in semi-final then in 1994 ICC Trophy where UAE cricket team defeated Kenya in the final. He was also coach of the Kenya team that played in the 1996 Cricket World Cup. They had a major win over West Indies cricket team which was considered one of ODI's biggest upsets.

== Administrator ==
He served as an International Cricket Council match referee in 9 Tests and 54 ODIs from March 1995 to February 2002. He was also chairman of the National Cricket Academy, based in Bangalore, and a coach for Rajasthan. Outside of cricket, he was an executive for State Bank of India.

== Death ==
Hanumant Singh died in Mumbai of multi-organ failure, after contracting dengue fever in the year 2006 at the age of 67.
