= Rajasthan cricket team =

Indian cricket team

- राजस्थान क्रिकेट संघ

Personnel
- Captain: Deepak Chahar
- Coach: Anshu Jain
- Owner: Rajasthan Cricket Association

Team information
- Colors: Sky Blue Navy Blue
- Founded: 1928
- Home ground: Sawai Mansingh Stadium, Jaipur
- Capacity: 30,000

History
- First-class debut: Vs Vidarbha, KL Saini Ground, Jaipur, 1999
- List A debut: Vs Uttar Pradesh, Sawai Mansingh Stadium, Jaipur, 2004
- Twenty20 debut: Vs Uttar Pradesh, Sawai Mansingh Stadium, Jaipur, 2007
- Ranji Trophy wins: 2
- Vijay Hazare Trophy wins: 0
- Syed Mushtaq Ali Trophy wins: 0
- Official website: Rajasthan Cricket Association
LA/T20 Kit

The Rajasthan cricket team is a cricket team which represents the Indian state of Rajasthan. The team won the Ranji Trophy in the 2010–11 and 2011-12 seasons, having finished runners-up eight times between 1960–61 and 1973-74. It is currently in the Ranji Trophy Elite group. It is run by the Rajasthan Cricket Association and is popularly known as "Team Rajasthan".

== History ==
=== Rajputana Cricket Association ===
Rajputana's first recorded match came in the 1928/29 Delhi Tournament against Aligarh, with the Rajputana Cricket Association being formed shortly thereafter in 1931 at Ajmer. (Note: What is today the modern state of Rajasthan was then a part of the British Raj and was known as Rajputana.) Rajputana's inaugural appearance in first-class cricket came in November 1933 against the touring Marylebone Cricket Club at Mayo College Ground in Ajmer, which resulted in a heavy innings defeat. The team entered the Ranji Trophy for the first time in the 1935/36 season, playing their first match in the competition against Central India, losing by a heavy margin. The team played in the following seasons Ranji Trophy, again losing to Central India, but this time by the reduced margin of just two wickets. Rajputana gained their first win in first-class cricket against Lionel Tennyson's touring eleven, with victory by two wickets in 1937. The team lost their only match against Southern Punjab in the 1938/39 Ranji Trophy, however the following season they recorded their first Ranji Trophy victory against Delhi, winning by 7 wickets. However they lost their following match against Southern Punjab by the margin of an innings and 190 runs. With the onset of World War II, cricket in India was somewhat disrupted, but first-class cricket continued to function.

== Grounds ==
=== Sawai Mansingh Stadium, Jaipur ===
Popularly known as SMS Stadium, Rajasthan play the majority of their home matches at the Sawai Mansingh Stadium. The stadium is owned by the Government of Rajasthan and operated by RCA, having a seating capacity of about 30,000 spectators. It was built during the reign of Sawai Man Singh II, The ends are called the City End and the Pavilion End.

=== KL Saini Ground, Jaipur ===
Mansarovar Ground or Jaipur District Cricket Association Ground or KL Saini Ground is situated in Mansarovar area of Jaipur, Rajasthan It is the secondary home ground of the Rajasthan cricket team. It has a capacity of 5,000 people and was opened in 1990.

=== International Cricket Stadium, Kota ===
Jay Kaylon Ground is a cricket ground in Kota, Rajasthan. The ground as established in 1974 with name of Municipal Stadium. The ground regularly hosts Ranji matches for Rajasthan cricket team. Till date the ground has hosted six first-class matches and a List A match between Wills XI and Uttar Pradesh cricket team.

=== Mayo College Ground, Ajmer ===
Mayo College Ground is a sports venue located in the campus of Mayo College in Ajmer, Rajasthan. It is a sports facilities for students and staff consisting of playing fields for football, hockey and a cricket ground with a view of the Aravali Hills and a beautiful old red sandstone pavilion called Bikaner Pavilion. It is one of the oldest grounds and one of the first venues in which Rajasthan cricket team ever played a recorded match at home. It has hosted 19 FC games but doesn't host any professional games anymore.

== Honours ==
Year	Final Result	Most Runs	Most Wickets
Ranji Trophy
1960–61	Runners-up	Kishan Rungta (282)	Salim Durani (35)
1961–62	Runners-up	Hanumant Singh (487)	Gundibail Sunderam (20)
1962–63	Runners-up	Vijay Manjrekar (520)	Subhash Gupte (29)
1963–64	Runners-up	Hanumant Singh (554)	Gundibail Sunderam (21)
1965–66	Runners-up	Kishan Rungta (410)	C. G. Joshi (26)
1966–67	Runners-up	Hanumant Singh (869)	C. G. Joshi (24)
1969–70	Runners-up	Suryaveer Singh (372)	Kailash Gattani (41)
1973–74	Runners-up	Parthasarathy Sharma (398)	Kailash Gattani (22)
2010–11	Champions	Hrishikesh Kanitkar (744)	Pankaj Singh (43)
2011–12	Champions	Robin Bist (1034)	Pankaj Singh (34)
Vijay Hazare Trophy
2006-07	Runners-up	Rohit Sharma (296)	Afroz Khan (12)
2023-24	Runners-up	Mahipal Lomror (301)	Aniket Choudhary (22)
Syed Mushtaq Ali Trophy
2017-18	Runners-up	Ankit Lamba (335)	Deepak Chahar (19)

== Famous players ==
Players who have represented India & RCA
Player	Formats	Debut
Vinoo Mankad	Test	1946
Avinash Choudhary 81	Test	1960
Hanumant Singh	Test	1964
Parthasarathy Sharma	Test/ODI	1974
Ajay Jadeja	Test/ODI	1992
Pravin Amre	Test/ODI	1992
Hrishikesh Kanitkar	Test/ODI	1997
Gagan Khoda	ODI	1998
Hemang Badani	Test/ODI	2000
Aakash Chopra	Test	2003
Pankaj Singh	Test/ODI	2014
Deepak Chahar	ODI/T20I	2018
Khaleel Ahmed	ODI/T20I	2018
Rahul Chahar	ODI/T20I	2019
Deepak Hooda	ODI/T20I	2022
Mukul Choudhary	ODI/T20I	2022
Manav Suthar	Test	2026
Ashok Sharma	T20I	2026

=== Foreign international players who briefly played for Rajasthan, along with season ===
- (England) Kabir Ali (2006-07)
- (England) Vikram Solanki (2006-07)

== Current squad ==
- Players with international caps are listed in **bold**.

Name	Birth date	Batting style	Bowling style	Format	Notes
Batters
Mahipal Lomror	16 November 1999 (age 27)	Left-handed	Slow left-arm orthodox	First-class, List A, & T20	
Karan Lamba	28 November 2004 (age 21)	Right-handed	Right-arm leg break	First-class, List A & T20	
Ramnivas Golada	23 October 1994 (age 32)	Right-handed	Right-arm medium	First-class & List A	
Sumit Godara	5 February 2004 (age 22)	Right-handed		First-class & List A	
Sachin Yadav	14 October 2004 (age 22)	Left-handed	Right-arm medium	First-class	
Abhijeet Tomar	14 March 1995 (age 31)	Right-handed	Right-arm off break	T20	
All-Rounders
Rohan Rajbhar	12 February 2006 (age 20)	Right-handed	Right-arm leg break	First-class & T20	
Vishal Harsh	29 August 1999 (age 27)	Right-handed	Right-arm off break	First-class	
Wicket-keepers
Mukul Choudhary	6 August 2004 (age 22)	Right-handed		First-class, List A, & T20	Plays for **Lucknow Super Giants** in IPL
Kunal Rathore	9 October 2002 (age 24)	Left-handed		First-class & T20	
Kartik Sharma	26 April 2006 (age 20)	Right-handed		First-class, List A, & T20	Plays for **Chennai Super Kings** in IPL
Spinners
Kukna Ajay Singh	13 December 1996 (age 29)	Left-handed	Slow left-arm orthodox	First-class & List A	
**Manav Suthar**	3 August 2002 (age 24)	Left-handed	Slow left-arm orthodox	First-class, List A, & T20	**Vice-captain**; Plays for **Gujarat Titans** in IPL
**Rahul Chahar**	4 August 1999 (age 27)	Right-handed	Right-arm leg break	T20	Plays for **Chennai Super Kings** in IPL
Mohit Changra	9 September 2002 (age 24)	Left-handed	Slow left-arm orthodox	First-class	
Himashu Nehra	8 August 2004 (age 22)	Left-handed	Slow left-arm orthodox	T20	
Fast Bowlers
**Ashok Sharma**	17 June 2002 (age 24)	Right-handed	Right-arm medium	First-class & List A	Plays for **Gujarat Titans** in IPL
Aniket Choudhary	28 January 1990 (age 36)	Right-handed	Left-arm medium	First-class & List A	
**Khaleel Ahmed**	5 December 1997 (age 28)	Right-handed	Left-arm medium	First-class & List A	Plays for **Sunrisers Hyderabad** in IPL
Akash Singh	26 April 2002 (age 24)	Right-handed	Left-arm medium	First-class & List A	Plays for **Lucknow Super Giants** in IPL
Deepak Chahar	7 August 1992 (age 34)	Right-handed	Right-arm medium	T20	**Captain**
Danish Bhambhu	5 October 2001 (age 25)	Right-handed	Right-arm medium	First-class	
Chetan Sharma	23 November 2005 (age 20)	Right-handed	Right-arm medium	First-class	
Himanshu Rana	11 November 2002 (age 24)	Right-handed	Right-arm medium	T20	
Honey Pratap Singh	19 August 2007 (age 19)	Right-handed	Right-arm medium	T20	

Updated as on 16 November 2026

== Captains ==
Notable Captains
Captain	Period
Walter Bradshaw	1935-40
Bhagwat Singh of Mewar	1946-57
Vinoo Mankad	1957-60
Kishan Rungta	1961-62
Raj Singh Dungarpur	1962-66
Hanumant Singh	1966-76
Kailash Gattani	1977-79
Parthasarathy Sharma	1979-85
Sanajay Vyas	1985-89
Rajiv Rathore	1991-96
Pravin Amre	1993-97
Gagan Khoda	1996-04
P. Krishnakumar	2001-05
Ajay Jadeja	2005-07
Venugopal Rao	2008-09
Aakash Chopra	2010-12
Hrishikesh Kanitkar	2010-13
Ashok Menaria	2013-23
Pankaj Singh	2014-17
Deepak Hooda	2023-24
Mahipal Lomror	2025–present

== Records ==
For more details on this topic, see

- List of Rajasthan first-class cricket records
- List of Rajasthan List A cricket records
