= List of Karnataka cricketers =

This is a list of all cricketers who have played first-class, list A or Twenty20 cricket for Karnataka cricket team (formerly called Mysore cricket team). Seasons given are first and last seasons; the player did not necessarily play in all the intervening seasons. Players in bold have played international cricket.

Last updated at the end of the 2015/16 season.

== A ==
- Jayasoorya Abhiram, 1979/80–1988/89
- Linganatha Adisesh, 1947/48–1955/56
- **Mayank Agarwal**, 2010/11–2015/16
- Syed Imtiaz Ahmed, 1975/76–1979/80
- Aswath Aiyappa, 2001/02
- Neravanda Aiyappa, 2001/02–2011/12
- Balachandra Akhil, 1998/99–2010/11
- S. L. Akshay, 2009/10–2012/13
- M. R. Alasingrachar, 1937/38–1943/44
- Bellipadi Chandrahasa Alva, 1957/58–1958/59
- Bellipadi Yeshwant Alva, 1958/59–1961/62
- Doddaballapur Ananth, 1996/97–1998/99
- Rangarao Ananth, 1988/89–1996/97
- V. Anatharam, 1967/68
- F. Antic, 1947/48
- K. P. Appanna, 2006/07–2013/14
- **Sreenath Aravind**, 2006/07–2015/16
- Arjun Raja, 1988/89–1991/92
- Jagadeesh Arunkumar, 1993/94–2004/05
- S. Arunkumar, 1968/69–1973/74
- Richard Ashley, 1937/38
- Poll Ashokanand, 1958/59–1971/72
- K. L. Ashwath, 1986/87
- S. Muvil, 2018/22
- Chandrashekar Avinash, 2012/13–2014/15
- Ashok Tilavalli

== B ==
- E. R. Badrinath, 1955/56
- Inderjit Barhoke, 1946/47
- Mithun Beerala, 1999/00-2004/05
- **Vijay Bharadwaj**, 1994/95-2004/05
- **Raghuram Bhat**, 1979/80-1992/93
- Shyamchandra Bhat, 1993/94
- Rajoo Bhatkal, 2005/06-2012/13
- Shishir Bhavane, 2014/15-2015/16
- **Roger Binny**, 1975/76-1989/90
- **Stuart Binny**, 2003/04-2015/16
- E. H. Boreham, 1935/36
- Sohaib Akhter, 2017/2020

== C ==
- K. C. Cariappa, 2015/16
- V. R. Chander, 1954/55
- **B. S. Chandrasekhar**, 1963/64-1979/80
- H. Chandrasekhar, 1978/79
- K. V. Chandrasekhar, 1945/46-1946/47
- Bharat Chipli, 2005/06-2011/12
- Deepak Chougule, 2002/03-2008/09
- N. Curtis, 1934/35-1935/36

== D ==
- Safi Darashah, 1934/35-1948/49
- Deepak Das Gupta, 1956/57-1960/61
- M. Dayanand, 1938/39-1945/46
- Sanjay Desai, 1973/74-1979/80
- Pavan Deshpande, 2014/15
- Srinivasa Dhananjaya, 2006/07-2007/08
- Mulewa Dharmichand, 2000/01-2002/03
- Gaurav Dhiman, 2005/06-2006/07
- P. G. Doraiswami, 1935/36-1942/43
- **Rahul Dravid**, 1990/91-2009/10
- Praveen Dubey, 2015/16
- **Devdutt Padikkal**, 2018/19

== E ==
- D. M. Engineer, 1952/53-1954/55
- Sai Eswar, 1972/73
- A. Ethinder, 1942/43-1943/44

== F ==
- Benjamin Frank, 1940/41-1958/59

== G ==
- **Dodda Ganesh**, 1994/95-2005/06
- B. M. Gangappa, 1961/62
- B. K. Garudachar, 1935/36-1945/46
- C. M. Gautam, 2007/08-2015/16
- E. Godfrey, 1936/37
- Shreyas Gopal, 2013/14-2015/16
- Yere Goud, 1994/95-2007/08
- C. Govindraj, 1945/46
- Krishnappa Gowtham, 2011/12-2013/14
- Rajaram Gurav, 1958/59-1961/62

== H ==
- M. S. Hanumesh, 1964/65
- Vedam Hariharan, 1974/75
- Vivek Hazare, 1954/55-1955/56
- Ken Hosking, 1935/36
- Najam Hussain, 1961/62-1965/66

== I ==
- F. K. Irani, 1939/40-1947/48

== J ==
- Arati Jagannath, 1961/62-1970/71
- A. V. Jayaprakash, 1971/72-1984/85
- H. Jayaram, 1975/76-1976/77
- Kartik Jeshwant, 1985/86-1995/96
- **David Johnson**, 1992/93-2001/02
- Rongsen Jonathan, 2009/10
- Jithin James, 2002/03
- Jatin Chandel, 2023
- **Sunil Joshi**, 1992/93-2010/11

== K ==
- Dayanand Kamath, 1962/63-1967/68
- Rajesh Kamath, 1985/86
- P. A. Kanickam, 1936/37
- Kunal Kapoor, 2012/13-2014/15
- Gopalaswamy Kasturirangan, 1948/49-1962/63
- Anand Katti, 1996/97-2001/02
- Abrar Kazi, 2010/11-2014/15
- Fazal Khaleel, 1994/95-1998/99
- **K. L. Rahul**, 2009/10-2015/16
- Mansur Ali Khan, 1993/94-2001/02
- Ranjit Khanwilkar, 1980/81-1985/86
- Sadiq Kirmani, 2015/16
- **Syed Kirmani**, 1967/68-1993/94
- Tejpal Kothari, 1986/87-1987/88
- Kunal Acharya,1993/94
- Prasidh Krishna, 2015/16
- S. Krishna, 1961/62-1963/64
- Trichy Krishna, 1951/52-1961/62
- BN Krishnamurthy, 1947/48-1948/49
- Subbarao Krishnamurthy, 1957/58-1967/68
- R. Krishnappa, 1977/78-1978/79
- V. Krishnaprasad, 1969/70
- Ajjampur Krishnaswamy, 1950/51-1959/60
- E. Krishnaswamy, 1935/36-1942/43
- Amit Kumar, 2000/01
- Anil Kumar, 1998/99-2000/01
- Clinton James Kelman, 1965-1970
- Ashok Kumar, 1969/70
- G. V. Kumar, 1977/78-1979/80
- Kranthi Kumar, 2014/15
- Sanath Kumar, 1985/86-1988/89
- **Vinay Kumar**, 2004/05-2015/16
- **Anil Kumble**, 1989/90-2009/10
- **Budhi Kunderan**, 1965/66-1969/70

== L ==
- K. Lakshman, 1973/74-1974/75
- C. R. Lakshminarayan, 1964/65-1975/76
- Narayanappa Lakshminarayan, 1964/65-1967/68
- Athahalli Lingiah, 1939/40
- Peter Lobo, 1985/86

== M ==
- K. Mahalingam, 1949/50-1952/53
- Subbarao Mahendra, 1964/65-1967/68
- Arevarigutta Mahesh, 2000/01
- K. L. Mahesh, 1954/55
- Abhinav Manohar, 2021/22
- John Maples, 1944/45
- David Mathias, 2014/15-2015/16
- P. McCosh, 1934/35-1936/37
- Dinesh Medh, 1955/56
- Caryl Mermagen, 1935/36
- Aditya Mishra, 2001/02
- G. D. Mishra, 1954/55
- **Abhimanyu Mithun**, 2007/08-2015/16
- Syed Moinuddin, 2012/13
- Ronit More, 2011/12-2014/15
- **Venkatappa Muddiah**, 1951/52
- P. Mukund, 1968/69
- T. Murari, 1934/35-1938/39
- L. Murphy, 1946/47
- Narasimha Murthy, 1945/46
- Prahladrao Srinivasa Murthy, 1997/98

== N ==
- Kalam Nagabhushan, 1965/66-1970/71
- A. K. S. Naidu, 1945/46-1947/48
- Thilak Naidu, 1998/99-2009/10
- Ren Nailer, 1934/35-1937/38
- **Karun Nair**, 2011/12-2015/16
- C. K. Nandan, 1983/84-1988/89
- B. C. Nanjundiah, 1945/46
- Subramanyam Narayan, 1951/52-1958/59
- M. K. Narayaniyengar, 1944/45
- Thameesdeen Nasiruddin, 1994/95-1996/97
- S. Nataraj, 1967/68-1968/69
- Gneshwar Naveen, 2014/15
- M. Navinchandra, 1960/61-1964/65
- Raghuttam Nawali, 1994/95-1996/97
- Salus Nazareth, 1952/53-1962/63
- Bernard Nicholas, 1938/39
- Ryan Ninan, 2009/10-2012/13

== P ==
- Gopal Pai, 1957/58-1959/60
- **Manish Pandey**, 2006/07-2015/16
- **Phiroze Palia**, 1933/34-1953/54
- Vivek Parasuram, 1994/95
- M. R. Parthasarathi, 1951/52-1952/53
- T. V. Parthasarathi, 1941/42
- Bhupendra Patel, 1954/55
- **Brijesh Patel**, 1969/70-1987/88
- Krishnakant Patel, 1949/50-1958/59
- Mukund Patel, 1955/56-1958/59
- Udit Patel, 2002/03-2015/16
- Yogendra Patel, 1961/62-1970/71
- Devraj Patil, 2005/06-2010/11
- K. B. Pawan, 2006/07-2012/13
- G. Pires, 1939/40
- Shyam Ponnappa, 2001/02-2004/05
- K. S. Prabhakar, 1939/40
- S. Prakash, 1987/88-1993/94
- **Venkatesh Prasad**, 1990/91-2003/04
- Vinoo Prasad, 2008/09
- **Erapalli Prasanna**, 1961/62-1978/79
- M. V. Prasanth, 1996/97
- K. Purshottam, 1980/81
- Hoshalliu Puttakempenna, 1959/60

== R ==
- K. S. Radhakrishnan, 1951/52-1958/59
- Chandrashekar Ragavendra, 2004/05-2005/06
- A. K. Raghu, 1984/85
- Chandrashekar Raghu, 2002/03-2008/09
- B. Raghunath, 1968/69-1978/79
- K. R. Rajagopal, 1961/62-1970/71
- M. S. Rajappa, 1968/69-1972/73
- G. M. Rajasekhar, 1941/42-1948/49
- **K. L. Rahul**, 2009/10-2015/16
- Sunil Raju, 2008/09-2013/14
- Bangalore Ramachandran, 1954/55-1959/60
- V. Ramadas, 1967/68
- A. Ramakrishnappa, 1961/62-1963/64
- B. V. Ramakrishnappa, 1936/37-1941/42
- K. S. Ramamurthi, 1934/35-1937/38
- Y. S. Ramaswami, 1934/35-1945/46
- C. J. Ramdev, 1939/40-1950/51
- Hejmadi Ramesh, 1975/76-1978/79
- Nagaraj Ramesh, 1999/00-2000/01
- Kaladevanhalli Ramprasad, 1959/60-1961/62
- H. D. Rangaiyengar, 1941/42
- K. L. Ranganath, 1942/43
- K. S. Rangaraj, 1937/38-1941/42
- Srinivas Rangaraj, 1952/53-1960/61
- Ganapathy Rao, 1957/58
- Hejmadi Bhaskar Rao, 1961/62-1967/68
- Hejmadi Girish Rao, 1997/98-1998/99
- Kolar Anathaswamy Rao, 1954/55-1956/57
- Krishna Rao, 1937/38-1942/43
- Nagaraja Rao, 1934/35-1939/40
- **N. Prabhakar Rao**, 1975/76-1976/77
- Prasannasinha Rao, 1969/70-1971/72
- Rama Rao, 1938/39-1941/42
- Rama Rao, 1940/41-1947/48
- Ramesh Rao, 1986/87-1990/91
- Sharad Rao, 1982/83-1985/86
- M. V. Subba Rao, 1939/40
- **Sudhakar Rao**, 1972/73-1984/85
- Venkoba Rao, 1945/46-1947/48
- Vittal Rao, 1945/46-1948/49
- Prakash Rathod, 1983/84-1985/86
- M. S. Ravindra, 1987/88
- Abhishek Reddy, 2014/15-2015/16
- Girish Reddy, 1989/90-1990/91
- K. C. Reddy, 1947/48
- Shreepada Renu, 1984/85
- Barrington Rowland, 1999/00-2007/08

== S ==
- Mohammad Sadaquat, 1987/88
- N. Sadashivan, 1963/64-1964/65
- Adithya Sagar, 2007/08-2010/11
- Carlton Saldanha, 1980/81-1992/93
- Ravikumar Samarth, 2013/14-2015/16
- Ganesh Satish, 2007/08-2013/14
- Gopalakrishnan Sekhar, 1990/91-1991/92
- Abbas Shah, 1945/46
- Rajashekar Shanbal, 2001/02
- Suresh Shanbal, 1979/80-1980/81
- H. S. Sharath, 2012/13-2015/16
- P. V. Shashikanth, 1987/88-1996/97
- Afan Sheriff, 2003/04
- Sudhindra Shinde, 2001/02-2007/08
- M. R. Shivashankar, 1948/49-1951/52
- Lulla Shyam, 1961/62
- Poll Shyamsunder, 1944/45-1952/53
- B. Siddarama, 1975/76-1978/79
- John Snaize, 1936/37-1943/44
- Shiraguppi Somasekhar, 1994/95-1999/00
- **Sujith Somasunder**, 1990/91-2005/06
- K. Sridhar, 1953/54
- **Javagal Srinath**, 1989/90-2000/01
- Krishnaraj Srinath, 1991/92-1993/94
- Krishnaswami Srinivasan, 1949/50-1958/59
- M. R. Srinivasaprasad, 1979/80-1987/88
- Krishnaraj Sriram, 1995/96-1999/00
- P. Sriram, 1979/80
- Linganath Subbu, 1951/52-1958/59
- **Venkataraman Subramanya**, 1959/60-1969/70
- Jagadeesha Suchith, 2013/14-2015/16
- Hanumantharao Surendra, 1984/85-1988/89
- Kittu Suresh, 1966/67-1971/72
- M. Suryanarayan, 1957/58-1961/62
- Siddharth Krishnamurthy Venkatesh, 2018/19-2022/23

== T ==
- Mohammed Taha, 2015/16
- Kamal Tandon, 1975/76-1982/83
- Prithviraj Tandon, 1951/52
- Keki Tarapore, 1945/46
- Shavir Tarapore, 1980/81-1986/87
- Mark Teversham, 1934/35
- K. Thimmappiah, 1940/41-1950/51
- K. Thimmiah, 1937/38
- T. Thimmiah, 1948/49-1952/53

== U ==
- K. P. Ubhayakar, 1945/46
- Ganaga Umesh, 1998/99-1999/00
- G. B. Umesh, 1946/47-1950/51
- **Robin Uthappa**, 2002/03-2015/16
- Vinay Uthappa, 2003/04

== V ==
- Santosh Vadeyaraj, 1999/00-2004/05
- Avinash Vaidya, 1992/93-1997/98
- Chanchikotti Varadaraj, 1952/53-1960/61
- Kennimbeli Vasudevamurthy, 1955/56-1962/63
- Ananta Vatsalya, 1983/84-1984/85
- A. V. Venkatnarayana, 1968/69-1972/73
- Candade Venugopal, 1956/57-1960/61
- Amit Verma, 2006/07-2013/14
- Anantharam Vijay, 1998/99-1999/00
- Madhu Vijay, 1988/89
- V. S. Vijay Kumar, 1967/68-1975/76
- B. Vijayakrishna, 1968/69-1983/84
- S. Vijayaprakash, 1975/76-1977/78
- M. G. Vijayasarathi, 1934/35-1942/43
- K. Viranchanamurthy, 1955/56
- Ghanshyam Vishandas, 1957/58-1962/63
- A. R. Viswanath, 1948/49
- Balepur Viswanath, 1971/72-1972/73
- **Gundappa Viswanath**, 1967/68-1987/88
- Kadur Viswanath, 1955/56-1961/62
- N. Viswanath, 1961/62
- Puttana Viswanath, 1950/51-1957/58
- **Sadanand Viswanath**, 1980/81-1989/90
- Harish Vora, 1977/78-1978/79

== Y ==
- Anand Yalvigi, 1998/99-2000/01
