= Wills Trophy =

Wills One-Day Trophy
- Countries: India
- Administrator: BCCI
- Format: List A cricket
- First edition: 1977–78
- Latest edition: 1999–2000
- Tournament format: Knock out
- Number of teams: 7
- Most successful: Mumbai (8 titles)
- Qualification: Ranji Trophy or Vijay Hazare Trophy

The Wills Trophy, formally named the Wills One-Day Trophy and named after sponsor Wills of ITC Limited), was an Indian List A cricket tournament organized by the Board of Control for Cricket in India (BCCI). Established in the 1977–78 season, it was played to find the best limited overs side of the domestic season as only the Ranji Trophy had inter-zonal finals. The annual tournament was played between seven sides, the five zonal winners and two composite teams, Wills XI (named after the title sponsor) and Indian Board President XI. Till the 1992–93 season, the team finishing first in each Zone of the Ranji Trophy qualified to play this tournament. Since the 1993–94 season, the team finishing first in each Zone of the Ranji One-Day Trophy qualified to play this tournament.

== Tournament history ==
Year	Final host	Winner	Runner-up	Most runs	Most wickets	Ref
1977–78	Chennai	Wills XI	Indian Board President XI	Dilip Vengsarkar (Wil-XI)	Karsan Ghavri (IBP-XI); Ashok Mankad (Wil-XI); S. Venkataraghavan (Wil-XI)	
1978–79	Mumbai	Mumbai & Delhi (shared)		Surinder Amarnath (Del)	Sunil Valson (Del); Sandeep Patil (Bom)	
1979–80	not played					
1980–81	Delhi	Wills XI	Indian Board President XI	Anshuman Gaekwad (Wil-XI)	Yograj Singh (IBP-XI)	
1981–82	Kanpur	Mumbai	Indian Board President XI	Sunil Gavaskar (Bom)	Ravi Shastri (Bom)	
1982–83	Kolkata	Mumbai	Delhi	Kirti Azad (Del)	Manoj Prabhakar (Del)	
1983–84	Bengaluru	Indian Board President XI	Karnataka	M. R. Srinivasaprasad (Kar)	Roger Binny (Kar); Sharad Rao (Kar); Ranjit Khanwilkar (Kar)	
1984–85	Mumbai	Wills XI	Indian Board President XI	Padam Shastri (IBP-XI)	Anshuman Gaekwad (Wil-XI)	
1985–86	Delhi	Mumbai	Delhi	Alan Sippy (Bom)	Maninder Singh (Del); Madan Lal (Del)	
1986–87	Nagpur	Delhi	Maharashtra	Shrikant Kalyani (Mah)	Sunil Gudge (Mah)	
1987–88	Kolkata	Indian Board President XI	Karnataka	W. V. Raman (IBP-XI)	Ajay Sharma (IBP-XI)	
1988–89	Chennai	Delhi	Railways	Raman Lamba (Del)	Manoj Prabhakar (Del)	
1989–90	Mumbai	Wills XI	Delhi	Navjot Sidhu (Wil-XI)	Ravi Shastri (Wil-XI)	
1990–91	Delhi	Mumbai	Wills XI	Ravi Shastri (Bom)	Raju Kulkarni (Bom)	
1991–92	Kanpur	Indian Board President XI	Wills XI	Sachin Tendulkar (IBP-XI)	Ravi Shastri (IBP-XI)	
1992–93	Guwahati	Delhi & Indian Board President XI (shared)		Ravi Sehgal (Del)	B Iqbal Khan (Mum); K. N. Ananthapadmanabhan (IBP-XI); Kirti Azad (Del); Kartar Nath (Del); Atul Wassan (Del); Ravi Sehgal (Del)	
1993–94	not played					
1994–95	Chennai	Mumbai	Haryana	Sachin Tendulkar (Bom)	Obaid Kamal (Wil-XI)	
1995–96	Mumbai	Wills XI	Bengal	Sachin Tendulkar (Wil-XI)	Arindam Sarkar (Ben)	
1996–97	Mohali	Mumbai	Haryana	Sanjay Manjrekar (Mum)	Sairaj Bahutule (Mum)	
1997–98	Lucknow	Mumbai	Indian Board President XI	Vikram Rathour (IBP-XI)	Sairaj Bahutule (Mum); Sandeep Sharma (IBP-XI)	
1998–99	Kolkata	Madhya Pradesh	Bengal	Amay Khurasiya (MP)	Laxmi Ratan Shukla (Ben); Harvinder Sodhi (MP)	
1999–2000	Visakhapatnam	Indian Board President XI	Karnataka	Sanjay Bangar (IBP-XI)	Murali Kartik (IBP-XI)	

== Teams summary ==
	Appearances			Statistics					
Team	Total	Champions	Runners-up	Mat.	Won	Lost	Tie	NR	Win%*
Mumbai	14	8	-	32	24	6	1	1	79.03
Indian Board President XI	21	5	5	41	24	14	2	1	62.50
Wills XI	21	5	2	40	23	16	0	0	58.97
Delhi	13	4	3	27	16	9	2	0	62.96
Madhya Pradesh	5	1	0	9	5	3	1	0	61.11
Karnataka	8	-	3	16	7	7	1	1	50.00
Bengal	15	-	2	24	8	15	0	1	34.87
Haryana	6	-	2	10	4	6	0	0	40.00
Railways	2	-	1	5	3	2	0	0	60.00
Maharashtra	4	-	1	7	3	4	0	0	42.86
Tamil Nadu	7	-	-	9	1	7	1	0	16.67
Hyderabad	5	-	-	6	1	4	0	1	20.00
Uttar Pradesh	12	-	-	13	1	12	0	0	7.69
Bihar	3	-	-	3	0	3	0	0	0.00
Odisha	2	-	-	2	0	2	0	0	0.00
Rajasthan	2	-	-	2	0	2	0	0	0.00
Baroda	2	-	-	2	0	2	0	0	0.00
Punjab	2	-	-	2	0	2	0	0	0.00
Gujarat	1	-	-	1	0	1	0	0	0.00
Andhra	1	-	-	1	0	1	0	0	0.00
Assam	1	-	-	1	0	1	0	0	0.00
Bangladesh Cricket Board XI	1	-	-	1	0	1	0	0	0.00

== See also ==
- Cricket in India
- NKP Salve Challenger Trophy
- Deodhar Trophy
- Vijay Hazare Trophy
