= 2002–03 Ranji Trophy =

Cricket tournament

- The Ranji Trophy, which the winners get.
- Administrator: BCCI
- Cricket format: First-class cricket
- Tournament format(s): League and knockout
- Champions: Mumbai (35th title)
- Participants: 27
- Most runs: Gautam Gambhir (Delhi) (833)
- Most wickets: Lakshmipathy Balaji (Tamil Nadu) and Sunil Joshi (Karnataka) (47)

The 2002–03 Ranji Trophy was the 69th season of the Ranji Trophy. Mumbai defeated Tamil Nadu by 141 runs in the final.

== Format ==
The major change in the format of the tournament was the introduction of the Elite and Plate divisions. The 15 teams which qualified from the Zonal league in the previous season were placed in two groups in the upper Elite division. The top two teams from each group qualified for the semifinal and then played for the Ranji title. The remaining twelve teams played each other in two groups in the Plate division. They played the Plate semifinal and the final. The finalists qualified for the Elite division in the next year while the two lowest placed teams in the Elite division were demoted.

Karnataka and Kerala were promoted to the Elite division for 2003–04. This meant that five of the six South Zone teams played in the Elite division. Himachal Pradesh and Orissa were demoted to the Plate.

== Scorecards and averages ==
- CricketArchive

== Group Matches ==
=== Elite Group ===
Group A

| Team | Played | W | L | FL | FD | NR | Bonus | Points |
|---|---|---|---|---|---|---|---|---|
| Mumbai | 7 | 5 | 0 | 1 | 1 | 0 | 2 | 13 |
| Delhi | 7 | 2 | 1 | 3 | 1 | 0 | 1 | 8 |
| Andhra Pradesh | 7 | 2 | 2 | 1 | 2 | 0 | | 5 |
| Hyderabad | 7 | 1 | 2 | 3 | 1 | 0 | | 5 |
| Rajasthan | 7 | 2 | 2 | 0 | 2 | 1 | | 4 |
| Bengal | 7 | 1 | 2 | 1 | 2 | 1 | | 3 |
| Railways | 7 | 0 | 2 | 3 | 1 | 1 | | 3 |
| Himachal Pradesh | 7 | 0 | 2 | 1 | 3 | 1 | | 1 |

- Mumbai and Delhi qualified for the Elite Group knockout stage.

Group B

| Team | Played | W | L | FL | FD | NR | Bonus | Points |
|---|---|---|---|---|---|---|---|---|
| Tamil Nadu | 6 | 2 | 0 | 3 | 1 | 0 | 1 | 8 |
| Baroda | 6 | 2 | 0 | 2 | 2 | 0 | 1 | 7 |
| Punjab | 6 | 2 | 0 | 3 | 1 | 0 | | 7 |
| Assam | 6 | 1 | 2 | 1 | 2 | 0 | 1 | 4 |
| Gujarat | 5 | 0 | 1 | 2 | 2 | 0 | | 2 |
| Uttar Pradesh | 6 | 0 | 2 | 1 | 2 | 1 | | 1 |
| Orissa | 5 | 0 | 2 | 0 | 2 | 1 | | 0 |

- Tamil Nadu and Baroda qualified for the Elite Group knockout stage.
- Baroda qualified to the knockouts ahead of Punjab on a better run-quotient.

=== Plate Group ===
Group A

| Team | Played | W | L | FL | FD | NR | Bonus | Points |
|---|---|---|---|---|---|---|---|---|
| Kerala | 5 | 4 | 0 | 1 | 0 | 0 | 2 | 11 |
| Vidarbha | 5 | 2 | 1 | 1 | 1 | 0 | 1 | 6 |
| Goa | 5 | 1 | 2 | 2 | 0 | 0 | | 4 |
| Saurashtra | 5 | 0 | 2 | 3 | 0 | 0 | | 3 |
| Services | 5 | 0 | 0 | 1 | 4 | 0 | | 1 |
| Tripura | 5 | 0 | 2 | 0 | 3 | 0 | | 0 |

- Kerala and Vidarbha qualified for the Plate Group knockout stage.

Group B

| Team | Played | W | L | FL | FD | NR | Bonus | Points |
|---|---|---|---|---|---|---|---|---|
| Karnataka | 5 | 3 | 0 | 1 | 1 | 0 | 2 | 9 |
| Madhya Pradesh | 5 | 3 | 1 | 1 | 0 | 0 | 2 | 9 |
| Haryana | 5 | 3 | 1 | 0 | 1 | 0 | 1 | 7 |
| Maharashtra | 5 | 2 | 1 | 1 | 1 | 0 | 1 | 6 |
| Jammu and Kashmi | 5 | 0 | 4 | 0 | 0 | 1 | | 0 |
| Bihar | 5 | 0 | 4 | 0 | 0 | 1 | | 0 |

- Karnataka and Madhya Pradesh qualified for the Elite Group knockout stage.

== Knockout Matches ==
=== Plate Semifinal 1 ===
18–21 January 2003
Scorecard

| Kerala | v | Madhya Pradesh |
| 156 (68.3 overs); C Hemanth Kumar 43 (79); Harvinder Sodhi 3/26 (10 overs) | | 112 (70.5 overs); Amay Khurasiya 42 (88); K. N. Ananthapadmanabhan 3/29 (14 overs) |
| 185 (81.4 overs); Suresh Kumar 58 (111); Narendra Hirwani 4/58 (31.4 overs) | | 161 (69.1 overs); Amay Khurasiya 77 (113); Sreekumar Nair 5/66 (13 overs) |

Kerala won by 68 runs
Nehru Stadium, Kochi
Umpires: VM Gupte and SM Bandedkar

- Kerala won the toss and elected to bat.
- Kerala advances to the Ranji Trophy Plate final

=== Plate Semifinal 2 ===
27–31 January 2003
Scorecard

| Karnataka | v | Vidarbha |
| 364 (139.5 overs); Barrington Rowland 124 (306); Chandrashekar Atram 3/71 (19 overs) | | 236 (76.5 overs); Vivek Naidu 43 (101); Sunil Joshi 5/45 (26.5 overs) |
| 607/9d (147 overs); Deepak Chougule 166 (282); Alind Naidu 2/42 (7 overs) | | 270 (78.5 overs); Ranjit Paradkar 70 (160); Sunil Joshi 4/51 (28 overs) |

Karnataka won by 465 runs
Vidarbha Cricket Association Ground, Nagpur
Umpires: V Chopra and Devendra Sharma

- Karnataka advances to the Ranji Trophy Plate final

=== Plate Final ===
4–6 March 2003
Scorecard

| Kerala | v | Karnataka |
| 190 (77.3 overs); Hemanth Kumar 48 (128); Sunil Joshi 6/62 (30 overs) | | 405 (129.1 overs); Sudhindra Shinde 84 (136); K. N. Ananthapadmanabhan 5/118 (37 overs) |
| 204 (59.3 overs); Hemanth Kumar 44 (130); Sunil Joshi 6/75 (23.3 overs) |

Karnataka won by an innings and 11 runs
M. Chinnaswamy Stadium, Bangalore
Umpires: SK Sharma and Jasbir Singh

- Kerala won the toss and elected to bat
- Karnataka won the Plate Division

=== Elite Semifinal 1 ===
25–29 April 2003
Scorecard

| Tamil Nadu | v | Delhi |
| 327 (128.4 overs); Sadagoppan Ramesh 82 (244); Rahul Sanghvi 3/26 (13 overs) | | 256 (95.1 overs); Narender Negi 44(135); MR Shrinivas 4/47 (23.1 overs) |
| 261 (93 overs); Sridharan Sharath 75 (175); NS Negi 3/41 (12 overs) | | 200 (53.3 overs); Virender Sehwag 99 (114); Lakshmipathy Balaji 5/49 (16 overs) |

Tamil Nadu won by 132 runs
Feroz Shah Kotla, Delhi
Umpires: F Gomes and AM Saheba

- Tamil Nadu won the toss and elected to bat
- Tamil Nadu qualified for the Ranji Trophy Final

=== Elite Semifinal 2 ===
25–29 April 2003
Scorecard

| Baroda | v | Mumbai |
| 130 (43.3 overs); Rakesh Solanki 43 (114); Ajit Agarkar 5/46 (15 overs) | | 390 (122.3 overs); Bhavin Thakkar 76 (254); Zaheer Khan 5/46 (23.3 overs) |
| 122 (51.2 overs); Rakesh Solanki 38 (142); Sairaj Bahutule 5/21 (13.2 overs) |

Mumbai won by an innings and 138 runs
Gujarat State Fertilizer Corporation Ground, Vadodara
Umpires: Devendra Sharma and K Hariharan

- Mumbai Nadu won the toss and elected to field
- Mumbai qualified for the Ranji Trophy Final

== Final ==
4–8 May 2003
Scorecard

| Mumbai | v | Tamil Nadu |
| 260 (91 overs); Wasim Jaffer 83 (154); Somasetty Suresh 3/51 (18 overs) | | 271 (115.3 overs); Sadagoppan Ramesh 85 (202); Ajit Agarkar 4/57 (29 overs) |
| 387/7 d (105 overs); Nishit Shetty 100 (133); MR Shrinivas 3/73 (21 overs) | | 235 (100.4 overs); Hemang Badani 109 (220); Sairaj Bahutule 5/70 (30.4 overs) |

Mumbai won by 141 runs
Wankhede Stadium, Mumbai
Umpires: V Chopra and NN Menon

- Mumbai won the toss and elected to bat.
