= Mansur Ali Khan (Karnataka cricketer) =

Indian former first-class cricketer (born 1972)

Personal information
- Full name: Mansur Ali Khan Ludhi
- Born: 22 May 1972 (age 54); Bangalore, Karnataka, India
- Nickname: MAK
- Batting: Right-handed
- Bowling: Right-arm medium-fast
- Role: Bowler

Domestic team information
- Years: Team
- 1993/94–2001/02: Karnataka

Career statistics
Competition	FC	List A
Matches	24	22
Runs scored	108	20
Batting average	10.80	20.00
100s/50s	0/0	0/0
Top score	21*	9*
Balls bowled	3,913	1,025
Wickets	78	39
Bowling average	25.37	19.15
5 wickets in innings	3	0
10 wickets in match	0	n/a
Best bowling	6/47	4/54
Catches/stumpings	11/–	3/–
- Source: ESPNcricinfo, 29 April 2017

Mansur Ali Khan Ludhi (born 22 May 1972) is an Indian former first-class cricketer who played for Karnataka between the 1993/94 and the 2001/02 seasons. He worked as a cricket coach after retirement, including a four-year stint as Karnataka's bowling coach and one season as the team's assistant coach.

== Career ==
Khan played as a right-arm medium pace bowler for Karnataka, appearing in 24 first-class and 22 List A matches. He was part of Karnataka's 1998–99 Ranji Trophy winning team in which he formed a successful new ball partnership with Dodda Ganesh. Khan was overlooked by Karnataka selectors for a large part of his career due to the presence of pace bowlers like Javagal Srinath and Venkatesh Prasad, and later due to the emergence of younger bowlers. His last first-class appearance was in December 2001.

Khan took to coaching after his playing career. He had coached Karnataka under-22 and under-25 teams before he announced his first-class retirement in 2008 at the age of 36. He continued to make sporadic appearances as a player, playing in the Karnataka Premier League and for his employer Canara Bank in the BCCI Corporate Trophy. In 2012, the Karnataka State Cricket Association appointed him as the bowling coach of the state side with J. Arunkumar being named as the batting coach. Under Khan and Arunkumar the team completed treble of Ranji Trophy, Irani Cup and Vijay Hazare Trophy in consecutive seasons in 2013–14 and 2014–15, while the duo came to be known as the "JAK-MAK combination". Khan remained in the role till 2016, when the KSCA elevated him to the assistant coach position with Arunkumar serving as the head coach. In April 2017, the KSCA replaced the duo with P. V. Shashikanth as the head coach and G. K. Anil Kumar as his assistant.
