= 1981–82 Ranji Trophy =

1981-82 Ranji Trophy
- The Ranji Trophy, which the winners get.
- Administrator: BCCI
- Cricket format: First-class cricket
- Tournament format(s): League and knockout
- Champions: Delhi (3rd title)
- Participants: 24
- Most runs: Sunil Gavaskar (Bombay) (632)
- Most wickets: Raghuram Bhat (Karnataka) (41)

The 1981–82 Ranji Trophy was the 48th season of the Ranji Trophy. The final between Delhi and Karnataka went into a sixth day before Delhi won on first innings lead.

== Highlights ==
- The final between Delhi and Karnataka was extended to a sixth day to allow the first innings to be decided. Delhi took the lead on the sixth day.
- Raghuram Bhat of Karnataka took a hat-trick in the semifinal against Bombay in the semifinal. Towards the end of the match, Sunil Gavaskar batted left handed.
- Laxman Sivaramakrishnan took 7 wickets for 28 runs on his debut in first class cricket, for Tamil Nadu against Delhi in the quarter-final. Delhi won by 20 runs despite being bowled out for 117 in the second innings.

The Tamil Nadu - Delhi match at the M. A. Chidambaram Stadium saw two crowd incidents. T. E. Srinivasan was given out off the last ball of the second day. As the players came off, the crowd invaded the ground and the pavilion shouting slogans against the umpires and the Delhi captain Mohinder Amarnath, dispersing only after an hour. On the fourth day, S. Vasudevan was given out caught off the pad the crowd again invaded the field. The "umpires were manhandled, chairs thrown on to the field and benches wrenched apart" before the police intervened.

== Group stage ==
=== South Zone ===
Team	Pld	W	L	D	T	NR	Pts	Q
Tamil Nadu	4	2	0	2	0	0	27	1.617
Karnataka	4	2	0	2	0	0	26	1.414
Hyderabad	4	2	0	2	0	0	23	1.166
Kerala	4	1	3	0	0	0	8	0.609
Andhra	4	0	4	0	0	0	0	0.708

=== West Zone ===
Team	Pld	W	L	D	T	NR	Pts	Q
Bombay	4	2	0	2	0	0	27	3.892
Saurashtra	4	2	0	2	0	0	22	0.848
Baroda	4	1	1	2	0	0	14	1.010
Maharashtra	4	0	1	3	0	0	13	0.909
Gujarat	4	0	3	1	0	0	5	0.428

=== North Zone ===
Team	Pld	W	L	D	T	NR	Pts	Q
Delhi	4	1	0	3	0	0	24	2.218
Punjab	4	2	0	2	0	0	24	1.738
Haryana	4	2	0	2	0	0	24	1.649
Services	4	1	2	1	0	0	11	0.628
Jammu and Kashmir	4	0	4	0	0	0	0	0.222

=== Central Zone ===
Team	Pld	W	L	D	T	NR	Pts	Q
Railways	4	2	0	2	0	0	27	1.649
Uttar Pradesh	4	2	0	2	0	0	22	1.227
Rajasthan	4	2	2	0	0	0	16	0.955
Madhya Pradesh	4	0	1	3	0	0	13	0.817
Vidarbha	4	0	3	1	0	0	3	0.554

=== East Zone ===
Team	Pld	W	L	D	T	NR	Pts	Q
Bihar	3	2	0	1	0	0	18	2.039
Bengal	3	1	0	2	0	0	15	1.723
Orissa	3	1	1	1	0	0	11	0.711
Assam	3	0	3	0	0	0	0	0.489

== Knockout stage ==
Pre-Quarter-finals
11 Feb 1982 — Madras
Tamil Nadu	287 & 378
Uttar Pradesh	195 & 229
15 Feb 1982 — Delhi
Railways	171 & 325
Bengal	244 & 253/4

Quarter-finals
25 Feb 1982 — Jamshedpur
Bihar	581/5d
Saurashtra	383 & 155/1
25 Feb 1982 — Madras
Tamil Nadu	298 & 213
Delhi	414 & 117
25 Feb 1982 — Bangalore
Karnataka	422
Punjab	130 & 125
25 Feb 1982 — Bombay
Bombay	652/6d
Bengal	252 & 219

Semi-finals
11 Mar 1982 — Jamshedpur
Bihar	180 & 133
Delhi	483/8d
11 Mar 1982 — Bangalore
Karnataka	470
Bombay	271 & 200/9d

Finals
24 Mar 1982 — Delhi
Delhi	707/8
Karnataka	705

=== Final ===
24–29 March 1982
Scorecard

Karnataka	v	Delhi (H)
705 (255.5 overs); Roger Binny 115, Brijesh Patel 124, Syed Kirmani 116, Ranjit Khanwilkar 113; Rakesh Shukla 3/158		707/8 (252.5 overs); Gursharan Singh 101, Mohinder Amarnath 185; Roger Binny 3/134

Delhi won on first innings lead
Feroz Shah Kotla, Delhi
Umpires: Dara Dotiwalla, Padmakar Pandit

- Karnataka won the toss and decided to bat
- The match was extended to a sixth day to get a result.

== Scorecards and averages ==
- CricketArchive
