= 1978–79 Ranji Trophy =

1978-79 Ranji Trophy
- The Ranji Trophy, which the winners get.
- Administrator: BCCI
- Cricket format: First-class cricket
- Tournament format(s): League and knockout
- Champions: Delhi (1st title)
- Participants: 24
- Most runs: Brijesh Patel (Karnataka) (850)
- Most wickets: Rajinder Goel (Haryana) (41)

The 1978–79 Ranji Trophy was the 45th season of the Ranji Trophy. Delhi won their first title defeating Karnataka.

== Group stage ==
=== North Zone ===
Team	Pld	W	L	D	T	NR	Pts	Q
Delhi	4	3	0	1	0	0	31	2.391
Haryana	4	3	1	0	0	0	25	1.570
Punjab	4	1	1	2	0	0	17	1.173
Services	4	0	2	2	0	0	8	0.711
Jammu and Kashmir	4	0	3	1	0	0	3	0.307

=== West Zone ===
Team	Pld	W	L	D	T	NR	Pts	Q
Bombay	4	2	0	2	0	0	27	2.607
Baroda	4	1	0	3	0	0	19	0.901
Gujarat	4	1	1	2	0	0	18	1.002
Maharashtra	4	1	1	2	0	0	14	0.781
Saurashtra	4	0	3	1	0	0	3	0.645

=== South Zone ===
Team	Pld	W	L	D	T	NR	Pts	Q
Tamil Nadu	4	2	0	2	0	0	25	2.114
Karnataka	4	2	0	2	0	0	25	1.890
Hyderabad	4	2	0	2	0	0	24	1.483
Kerala	4	1	3	0	0	0	8	0.493
Andhra	4	0	4	0	0	0	0	0.410

=== Central Zone ===
Team	Pld	W	L	D	T	NR	Pts	Q
Uttar Pradesh	4	2	0	2	0	0	27	1.764
Madhya Pradesh	4	1	0	3	0	0	21	1.017
Rajasthan	4	1	0	3	0	0	16	1.196
Vidarbha	4	0	1	3	0	0	8	0.448
Railways	4	0	3	1	0	0	5	0.793

=== East Zone ===
Team	Pld	W	L	D	T	NR	Pts	Q
Bengal	3	3	0	0	0	0	24	1.501
Bihar	3	2	1	0	0	0	16	1.509
Orissa	3	0	2	1	0	0	2	0.717
Assam	3	0	2	1	0	0	2	0.469

== Knockout stage ==
Pre-Quarter-finals
12 Feb 1979 — Calcutta
Bengal	245 & 162/4
Haryana	253 & 152
21 Feb 1979 — Bombay
Bombay	577/9d
Bihar	284 & 180

Quarter-finals
24 Feb 1979 — Bangalore
Karnataka	371 & 265/4d
Bengal	128 & 272
24 Feb 1979 — Baroda
Baroda	346
Madhya Pradesh	193 & 150
24 Feb 1979 — Bombay
Bombay	565
Uttar Pradesh	154 & 165
24 Feb 1979 — Delhi
Delhi	316 & 92/5
Tamil Nadu	197 & 210

Semi-finals
9 Mar 1979 — Bangalore
Karnataka	582/8d
Baroda	237 & 322
8 Mar 1979 — Bombay
Bombay	329
Delhi	359 & 436/6

Finals
17 Mar 1979 — Bangalore
Karnataka	411 & 122
Delhi	516 & 416/8d

=== Final ===
24–29 March 1979
Scorecard

Delhi	v	Karnataka (H)
516 (165.1 overs); Surinder Amarnath 132, Surinder Khanna 111; A. V. Jayaprakash 3/38		411 (99 overs); Brijesh Patel 166; Madan Lal 3/50
416/8 decl (132 overs); Mohinder Amarnath 178*, Surinder Khanna 128; B. Vijayakrishna 2/100		122 (34 overs); Syed Kirmani 33; Madan Lal 5/30

Delhi won by 399 runs
M. Chinnaswamy Stadium, Bangalore
Umpires: Dara Dotiwalla and Jiban Ghosh

- Delhi won the toss and decided to bat

== Scorecards and averages ==
- CricketArchive
