= 1982–83 Ranji Trophy =

Cricket tournament

1982-83 Ranji Trophy
- The Ranji Trophy, which the winners get.
- Administrator: BCCI
- Cricket format: First-class cricket
- Tournament format(s): League and knockout
- Champions: Karnataka (3rd title)
- Participants: 24
- Most runs: Anshuman Gaekwad (Baroda) (731)
- Most wickets: Raghuram Bhat (Karnataka) (42)

The 1982–83 Ranji Trophy was the 49th season of the Ranji Trophy. Karnataka won the final against Bombay on first innings lead.

Bombay scored 534 runs in the final. Karnataka lost their sixth wicket at 293 but were revived by a seventh wicket partnership of 154 between Roger Binny and J. Abhiram. They still lost their ninth wicket at 526. Raghuram Bhat and B. Vijayakrishna took the score to 535 when the latter was out. On the final day, Sandeep Patil scored 121* before lunch. Bombay declared setting Karnataka to score 197 in two sessions. Karnataka instead played out 70 overs to score 179 for 5 and win the title on first innings lead.

== Highlights ==
- Roger Binny of Karnataka scored 115 & 45 in the final. In the semifinal against Haryana he took 8 for 22 and scored 54 (highest score of the match).
- Hoshedar Contractor, son of former Indian captain Nari Contractor, made his only first class appearance in the Bombay - Orissa quarter final and scored a zero.
- C.S. Suresh Kumar who made his debut for Tamil Nadu scored 146 and 162 in his second and third matches and 110 against Delhi in the quarter-final.

== Group stage ==
=== North Zone ===
Team	Pld	W	L	D	T	NR	Pts	Q
Haryana	4	2	0	2	0	0	25	1.744
Delhi	4	2	0	2	0	0	24	1.385
Punjab	4	1	0	3	0	0	21	1.243
Jammu and Kashmir	4	1	3	0	0	0	9	0.676
Services	4	0	3	1	0	0	3	0.585

=== West Zone ===
Team	Pld	W	L	D	T	NR	Pts	Q
Baroda	4	2	0	2	0	0	27	2.059
Bombay	4	1	0	3	0	0	22	1.985
Maharashtra	4	1	1	2	0	0	16	0.956
Saurashtra	4	1	1	2	0	0	15	0.754
Gujarat	4	0	3	1	0	0	3	0.401

=== South Zone ===
Team	Pld	W	L	D	T	NR	Pts	Q
Karnataka	4	2	0	2	0	0	26	1.818
Tamil Nadu	4	2	0	2	0	0	26	1.763
Hyderabad	4	2	0	2	0	0	26	1.615
Andhra	4	1	3	0	0	0	8	0.696
Kerala	4	0	4	0	0	0	0	0.267

=== Central Zone ===
Team	Pld	W	L	D	T	NR	Pts	Q
Uttar Pradesh	4	2	0	2	0	0	25	1.790
Rajasthan	4	1	0	3	0	0	23	1.237
Railways	4	1	0	3	0	0	20	1.024
Madhya Pradesh	4	1	1	2	0	0	14	0.760
Vidarbha	4	0	4	0	0	0	0	0.640

=== East Zone ===
Team	Pld	W	L	D	T	NR	Pts	Q
Orissa	3	1	0	2	0	0	15	1.270
Bengal	3	0	0	3	0	0	14	2.548
Bihar	3	0	0	3	0	0	11	0.936
Assam	3	0	1	2	0	0	6	0.265

== Knockout stage ==
Pre-Quarter-finals
29 Jan 1983 — Madras
Tamil Nadu	449 & 172/6
Uttar Pradesh	351 & 269
29 Jan 1983 — Baroda
Baroda	558
Rajasthan	281 & 230/6

Quarter-finals
11 Feb 1983 — Delhi
Delhi	559
Tamil Nadu	229 & 306/8
11 Feb 1983 — Bombay
Bombay	500/9d
Orissa	92 & 153
11 Feb 1983 — Faridabad
Haryana	279 & 190
Bengal	145 & 253
11 Feb 1983 — Baroda
Baroda	63 & 130
Karnataka	128 & 179

Semi-finals
25 Feb 1983 — Delhi
Delhi	338 & 216/6
Bombay	494
25 Feb 1983 — Faridabad
Haryana	78 & 125
Karnataka	230

Finals
11 Mar 1983 — Bombay
Bombay	534 & 213/4d
Karnataka	551 & 179/5

=== Final ===
11–15 March 1983
Scorecard

Bombay (H)	v	Karnataka
534 (192.4 overs); Chandrakant Pandit 157; Raghuram Bhat 4/121 (52.4 overs)		551 (154.4 overs); Roger Binny 115; Raju Kulkarni 5/157 (40.4 overs)
213/4d (27 overs); Sandeep Patil 121*; Jayasoorya Abhiram 2/48 (8 overs)		179/5 (70 overs); Sadanand Viswanath 77; Suresh Shetty 3/34 (19 overs)

Karnataka won on first innings lead
Wankhede Stadium, Bombay
Umpires: S. R. Bose and Swaroop Kishen

- Karnataka won the toss and decided to field.
- Karnataka was all out for 535 and had 16 penalty runs added to it.

== Scorecards and averages ==
- CricketArchive
