= Venkataraman Subramanya =

Indian cricketer

Personal information
- Born: 16 July 1936 (age 90); Bangalore, British India
- Batting: Right-handed
- Bowling: Right-arm medium fast

International information
- National side: India
- Test debut (cap 111): 19 March 1965 v New Zealand
- Last Test: 7 March 1968 v New Zealand

Career statistics
Competition	Test	First-class
Matches	9	101
Runs scored	263	4,219
Batting average	18.78	31.48
100s/50s	0/2	8/21
Top score	75	213*
Balls bowled	444	5,566
Wickets	3	70
Bowling average	67.00	44.18
5 wickets in innings	0	1
10 wickets in match	0	0
Best bowling	2/32	7/78
Catches/stumpings	9/–	120/–
- Source: ESPNcricinfo, 20 November 2022

Venkataraman Subramanya (born 16 July 1936) is an Indian former cricketer who played in nine Test matches from 1965 to 1968. He was an aggressive middle order batsman, who captained Mysore for some years, and a useful leg-spin bowler. He later emigrated to Australia.

== Early life ==
Subramanya grew up in a joint family in Malleswaram. His father was a civil engineer who built a lot of houses in Bangalore. His uncle was the chief engineer when the KRS Dam was built. They had a house with a huge compound where all the cousins could play cricket. Two of Subramanya's brothers, V. Ramdas and V. Krishnaprasad also played for Mysore.

Subramanya studied at the Malleswaram High School and later Basappa Intermediate College before graduating from Central College. He turned out for Malleswaram Gymkhana. Unlike other cities at that time, Bombay and Madras, Bangalore did not have a major tournament. The only exposure that the youngsters got was from radio. Subramanya learnt cricket by listening to commentary and imbibing some lessons.

== Ranji career ==
Despite being an accomplished batsman, Subramanya made his Ranji Trophy debut against Hyderabad batting at number 10. He explained this by saying –

"A.S. Krishnaswamy was the captain. He had already returned to Mysore city and was out of touch with the Bangaloreans. I felt frustrated on my debut. ASK did not know the players and what they did. In my debut match I went in at number 10. ASK did not know who I was and also did not bother to find out."

Mysore made the final that year, but they had a new skipper. Kennimbeli Vasudevamurthy was made captain of the team and he promoted Subramanya higher up in the order. The game against Bombay took place at the Brabourne Stadium. Subramanya excelled with a fine century. Despite his efforts, Mysore lost the game by an innings and 22 runs.

Subramanya built on his success in his debut season and scored more runs in the following seasons. He was appointed as captain of the Mysore team in 1963. In his first season as captain, he led his team to a semi-final showdown against Bombay at Central College Ground in Bangalore. His excessive shielding of his tail end partners cost him his century as he was dismissed for 99 by Subhash Gupte.

Subramanya had a sensational Duleep Trophy by scoring hundreds against North Zone and West Zone. He was thus selected to the Indian cricket team.

== International career ==
Subramanya played with moderate success in the few Tests that he played between 1965 and 1968. Against West Indies at Madras in 1966–67, he hit a breezy 61, treating Hall and Griffith with disdain. He did little of note on the tour of England in 1967, but he touched form late and played in two of the three Tests. Pressed to open the attack because of injuries to the regular new ball bowlers, he bowled Geoff Boycott in the third Test at Edgbaston. On the tour of Australia and New Zealand in 1967–68, he did little of note, save for a fighting 75 in a losing cause in the first Test at Adelaide.

== Later career ==
Subramanya later returned to play for the Mysore team. His greatest contribution to Karnataka Cricket was as a leader. Under his leadership, talented cricketers like B. S. Chandrasekhar, Gundappa Vishwanath, EAS Prasanna, Syed Kirmani made their debuts and were given extended runs. He inculcated a sense of team spirit that lacking earlier. He broke down club cricket loyalties and inspired the cricketers to play for Mysore.

Subramanya was considered ahead of his time. At a time, when fielding drills were non-existent, he introduced physical training in the form of jogging, stretching, cross-training and intense fielding practices. He fought with the administrators for better practice facilities at the RSI grounds in Bangalore. He insisted on a proper diet for the cricketers.

Subramanya emigrated to Australia in late 1969.

== Legacy ==
Subramanya's contribution to Karnataka cricket was felt after he left the game. Brijesh Patel believed that Mysore could have won the Ranji Trophy much earlier if Subramanya had stayed back to guide the team. Gundappa Vishwanath said – "The 1974 team that won the Ranji Trophy was Mani's (Subramanya) team. He built the side and brought it to championship-winning shape."

Subramanya is settled in Sydney. He works for Law Society of New South Wales.
