= Kaladevanhalli Ramprasad =

Indian cricketer (1933–2015)

Personal information
- Full name: Kaladevanhalli Murudevagowda Ramprasad
- Born: 17 December 1933; Mysore, India
- Died: 23 November 2015 (aged 81); Bangalore, India
- Batting: Right-handed
- Bowling: Right-arm medium

Domestic team information
- Years: Team
- 1959–1962: Mysore
- Source: ESPNcricinfo, 14 October 2020

Kaladevanhalli Ramprasad (17 December 1933 – 23 November 2015) was an Indian cricketer. He played four first-class matches for Mysore between 1959 and 1962.

== See also ==
- List of Karnataka cricketers
