= Abhiram =

Abhiram is a given name and surname. People with the name include:

- Abhiram Radhakrishnan
- Abhiram Bhadkamkar
- Abhiram Sharma
- Jayasoorya Abhiram
