= Board President's XI =

Board President's XI or Board XI may refer to several cricket teams:

- Board President's XI, a team representing Bangladesh Cricket Board
- Board President's XI, a team representing the Board of Control for Cricket in India
- Board President's XI, a team representing Cricket South Africa
- Board President's XI, a team representing Sri Lanka Cricket
