= Mithun Beerala =

Indian cricketer (born 1977)

Personal information
- Full name: Mithun Raghunath Beerala
- Born: 7 October 1977 (age 49); Bangalore, Karnataka, India
- Batting: Right-handed
- Bowling: Right-arm medium-fast
- Role: Allrounder
- Source: ESPNcricinfo, 13 June 2022

Mithun Beerala (born 7 October 1977) is a former Indian first-class cricketer who played for Karnataka cricket team and Indian cricket match referee.

== Career ==
Mithun Beerala The former right-hander player. played First-class cricket for Karnataka cricket team and later plied his trade in the Karnataka Premier League. Birala made his first-class debut for Andhra cricket team in the 1999–2000 Ranji Trophy on 25 December 1999. season slammed twin half centuries. first inning runs 83 (96) and second inning runs 93 (133).In September 2006, Mithun moved to Madhya Pradesh cricket team before retiring from the game. He played his last first-class game runs 5 (12) in 2007 for Madhya Pradesh cricket team against Haryana cricket team in Rohtak. Birala 24 first-class games in the Ranji Trophy. 24 first-class games in the Ranji Trophy, he scored 1290 runs including 1 centuries and 6 half-centuries in the 43 innings he batted, at an average of 33.07. he best Scored of 101 runs not out. Birala played the first two seasons KPL a disappointing but, Beerala participated next season by the Bijapur Bulls in the Karnataka Premier League. This season helped his side to qualify for the semifinals. Beerala also appeared in 21 List A games, all for Karnataka, he scored 580 runs including 4 half-centuries in the 21 innings he batted, at an average of 30.52 with a best of 80 runs not out.
