= 1974–75 Ranji Trophy =

1974-75 Ranji Trophy
- The Ranji Trophy, which the winners receive
- Administrator: BCCI
- Cricket format: First-class cricket
- Tournament format(s): League and knockout
- Champions: Bombay (25th title)
- Participants: 24
- Most runs: Ashok Mankad (Bombay) (575)
- Most wickets: Bishan Bedi (Delhi) (64)

The 1974–75 Ranji Trophy was the 41st season of the Ranji Trophy. Bombay regained the title defeating defending champions Karnataka.

== Group stage ==
=== West Zone ===
Team	Pld	W	L	D	T	NR	Pts	Q
Bombay	4	2	0	2	0	0	26	1.983
Gujarat	4	1	1	2	0	0	17	0.819
Baroda	4	0	1	3	0	0	15	0.924
Maharashtra	4	0	0	4	0	0	14	1.150
Saurashtra	4	0	1	3	0	0	9	0.604

=== North Zone ===
Team	Pld	W	L	D	T	NR	Pts	Q
Delhi	5	5	0	0	0	0	41	2.615
Haryana	5	3	1	1	0	0	30	1.340
Railways	5	3	2	0	0	0	25	1.387
Services	5	1	2	2	0	0	16	0.760
Punjab	5	1	3	1	0	0	11	0.700
Jammu and Kashmir	5	0	5	0	0	0	0	0.392

=== East Zone ===
Team	Pld	W	L	D	T	NR	Pts	Q
Bengal	3	2	0	1	0	0	21	3.182
Bihar	3	2	0	1	0	0	20	1.707
Orissa	3	1	2	0	0	0	8	0.606
Assam	3	0	3	0	0	0	0	0.254

=== South Zone ===
Team	Pld	W	L	D	T	NR	Pts	Q
Hyderabad	4	2	0	2	0	0	27	1.387
Karnataka	4	2	0	2	0	0	25	1.298
Tamil Nadu	4	1	1	2	0	0	17	1.160
Andhra	4	2	2	0	0	0	16	0.832
Kerala	4	0	4	0	0	0	0	0.606

=== Central Zone ===
Team	Pld	W	L	D	T	NR	Pts	Q
Rajasthan	3	1	0	2	0	0	18	2.309
Madhya Pradesh	3	1	0	2	0	0	14	0.884
Uttar Pradesh	3	0	0	3	0	0	11	0.864
Vidarbha	3	0	2	1	0	0	5	0.705

== Knockout stage ==
Pre-Quarter-finals
14 Feb 1975 — Indore
Madhya Pradesh	383 & 97/2
Haryana	583
14 Feb 1975 — Delhi
Delhi	331 & 100/4
Gujarat	282 & 145

Quarter-finals
28 Feb 1975 — Hyderabad
Hyderabad	334 & 88/0
Haryana	180 & 241
28 Feb 1975 — Bombay
Bombay	307
Bihar	43 & 236
28 Feb 1975 — Delhi
Delhi	195 & 109/7
Rajasthan	94 & 207
28 Feb 1975 — Calcutta
Bengal	398
Karnataka	492 & 131/4

Semi-finals
14 Mar 1975 — Hyderabad
Hyderabad	323 & 149/7
Bombay	500/8d & 156/6d
14 Mar 1975 — Delhi
Delhi	220 & 171
Karnataka	300 & 95/3

Finals
29 Mar 1975 — Bombay
Bombay	305 & 151/3
Karnataka	240 & 215

== Final ==
29 March - 1 April 1975
Scorecard

Karnataka	v	Bombay (H)
240 (100.5 overs); G. R. Viswanath 144; Karsan Ghavri 5/66		305 (102 overs); Sunil Gavaskar 96*; E. A. S. Prasanna 6/123
215 (98.5 overs); Brijesh Patel 70; Eknath Solkar 4/43		151/3 (37.1 overs); Ashok Mankad 48*; B. S. Chandrasekhar 2/48

Bombay won by 7 wickets
Wankhede Stadium, Bombay

- Not known

== Scorecards and averages ==
- ESPNcricinfo
- CricketArchive
