= P. V. Shashikanth =

Indian cricketer (born 1966)

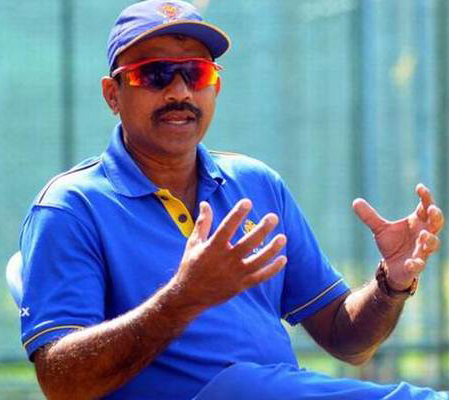

Personal information
- Full name: Paramnathe Veed Shashikanth
- Born: 5 April 1966 (age 60); Mangalore, Karnataka, India
- Batting: Right-handed
- Bowling: Right-arm medium
- Role: Opening batsman

Domestic team information
- Years: Team
- 1987/88–1996/97: Karnataka

Career statistics
Competition	FC	List A
Matches	51	19
Runs scored	2,397	538
Batting average	31.53	33.62
100s/50s	4/14	2/1
Top score	160	106
Balls bowled	66	30
Wickets	1	4
Bowling average	28.00	3.25
5 wickets in innings	0	0
10 wickets in match	0	n/a
Best bowling	1/15	4/13
Catches/stumpings	48/–	7/–
- Source: ESPNcricinfo, 29 April 2017

Paramnathe Veed Shashikanth (born 5 April 1966) is an Indian former first-class cricketer who played for Karnataka from 1987/88 to 1996/97. He worked as a cricket coach after retirement and became the head coach of the Karnataka team in April 2017.

== Life and career ==
Shashikanth was born on 5 April 1966 in Mangalore. He shifted to Bangalore early in his career, on the advice of his brother P. V. Mohan. He joined the St. Joseph's College in the city and became the college team captain in the second year.

Having scored heavily in the KSCA League, Shashikanth made his first-class debut for Karnataka in the 1988–89 Ranji Trophy. He went on to play 51 first-class and 19 List A matches over ten seasons. He also captained Karnataka to victory in Moin-ud-Dowlah Gold Cup Tournament in 1994 against Sachin Tendulkar's Sun Grace XI and a depleted Karnataka team to the title in the 1996–97 Irani Trophy against a Rest of India team captained by Navjot Singh Sidhu. He announced retirement from cricket in October 1999.

An employee with Vijaya Bank, Shashikanth continued to be associated with cricket after retirement, coaching the state's age-group teams. In April 2017, he was appointed head coach of the Karnataka senior team, replacing J. Arunkumar. In 2018, he was appointed as the coach of Mizoram cricket team by BCCI.
