= Alan Sippy =

Indian cricketer

Personal information
- Full name: Alan Nanik Sippy
- Born: 7 February 1962 (age 64); Bombay, Maharashtra, India
- Batting: Left-handed
- Bowling: Slow left-arm
- Role: Batsman

Domestic team information
- Years: Team
- 1984/85–1990/91: Bombay

Career statistics
Competition	FC	LA
Matches	27	7
Runs scored	1284	279
Batting average	49.38	55.80
100s/50s	5/5	0/3
Top score	138	90
Balls bowled	555	24
Wickets	7	0
Bowling average	46.14	–
5 wickets in innings	0	–
10 wickets in match	0	–
Best bowling	3/33	–
Catches/stumpings	16/–	4/–
- Source: ESPNcricinfo, 12 August 2022

Alan Nanik Sippy (born 7 February 1962) is a former Indian cricketer who played first-class and List A cricket for Bombay between 1984 and 1991. He was Sachin Tendulkar's first batting partner in first-class cricket. He is now a businessman in India.

== Career ==
A left-handed batsman and occasional slow left-arm spin bowler, Sippy was the outstanding batsman in the 50-over Wills Trophy in 1985–86, scoring 55, 51 and then 90 in the final, which Bombay won by one wicket. The highest of his five first-class centuries was 138 for Bombay against Baroda in the 1989–90 Ranji Trophy.

Sippy was in the Bombay team when Sachin Tendulkar made his first-class debut at the age of 15 in the Ranji Trophy match between Bombay and Gujarat in December 1988. Sippy, batting at number three, added 159 for the second wicket with Lalchand Rajput before Rajput was run out for 99, bringing Tendulkar to the wicket. Sippy and Tendulkar then added 155 before Sippy was out for 127, and Tendulkar went on to make 100 not out.

Sippy is an executive director of Samira Habitats, a lifestyle infrastructure and property development company in India.
