= Balachandra Akhil =

Indian cricketer (born 1977)

Personal information
- Born: 7 October 1977 (age 49); Bangalore, Karnataka, India
- Batting: Right-handed
- Bowling: Right-arm medium-fast
- Role: All-rounder

Domestic team information
- Years: Team
- 1998–2009: Karnataka
- 2008–2010: Royal Challengers Bangalore
- 2011: Kochi Tuskers Kerala
- Last FC: 24 November 2009 Karnataka v Maharashtra
- Last LA: 21 February 2009 Karnataka v Tamil Nadu

Career statistics
| Competition | FC | LA | T20 |
|---|---|---|---|
| Matches | 51 | 69 | 35 |
| Runs scored | 1,810 | 1,382 | 321 |
| Batting average | 28.73 | 27.64 | 17.83 |
| 100s/50s | 1/14 | 0/8 | 0/0 |
| Top score | 135 | 91 | 35 |
| Balls bowled | 4,283 | 2,653 | 535 |
| Wickets | 49 | 57 | 24 |
| Bowling average | 37.48 | 34.38 | 26.58 |
| 5 wickets in innings | 1 | 0 | 0 |
| 10 wickets in match | 0 | 0 | 0 |
| Best bowling | 5/58 | 4/31 | 3/16 |
| Catches/stumpings | 79/– | 34/– | 6/– |
- Source: ESPNcricinfo, 23 July 2012

Balachandra Akhil (born 7 October 1977) is an Indian former cricketer and cricket commentator who played for Karnataka . He is a right-handed middle-order batsman a medium-fast bowler . he was a part of the Karnataka Under-19 team for the 1995 Cooch Behar Trophy and became a part of the Karnataka State cricket team in 1998. He was a part of Royal Challengers Bangalore for the first three seasons of the Indian Premier League and played for Kochi Tuskers Kerala in the fourth season.

He captained the Provident Bangalore in 2010 Karnataka Premier League.
