= Ken Hosking =

English cricketer

Personal information
- Full name: John Kenneth Hosking
- Born: 10 March 1913; Camborne, Cornwall, England
- Died: 1999; Canterbury, Kent, England
- Batting: Unknown

Domestic team information
- Years: Team
- 1935/36: Mysore
- 1932–1938: Cornwall

Career statistics
Competition	First-class
Matches	1
Runs scored	32
Batting average	16.00
100s/50s	0/0
Top score	30
Balls bowled	–
Wickets	–
Bowling average	–
5 wickets in innings	–
10 wickets in match	–
Best bowling	–
Catches/stumpings	–/–
- Source: ESPNcricinfo, 4 January 2015

John Kenneth Hosking (10 March 1913 – 1999) was an English cricketer active in the 1930s. Hosking, whose batting and bowling styles are unknown, played in one first-class cricket match.

Hosking made his debut for Cornwall against the Kent Second XI in the 1932 Minor Counties Championship. He continued to play minor counties cricket for Cornwall until 1934, after which he left England for the British Raj. While there he played a single first-class match for Mysore against Madras in the 1935–36 Ranji Trophy at the Gymkhana Ground, Bangalore. He scored 30 runs in Mysore's first-innings, before being dismissed by Ram Singh, while in their second-innings he was dismissed for 2 runs by Morappakam Gopalan, with Madras winning the match by 109 runs. Upon returning to England, Hosking played eight Minor Counties Championship matches for Cornwall in 1938.
