= Raghuram Bhat =

Indian cricketer

President of the Karnataka State Cricket Association
- Incumbent
- Assumed office November 2022
- Cricket career

Personal information
- Full name: Adwai Raghuram Bhat
- Born: 16 April 1958 (age 68); Puttur, Mysore State, India
- Batting: Left-handed
- Bowling: Slow left-arm orthodox

International information
- National side: India
- Test debut (cap 165): 5 October 1983 v Pakistan
- Last Test: 21 October 1983 v West Indies

Career statistics
Competition	Test	First-class
Matches	2	82
Runs scored	6	754
Batting average	3.00	13.00
100s/50s	0/0	0/0
Top score	6	47*
Balls bowled	438	20,837
Wickets	4	374
Bowling average	37.75	22.66
5 wickets in innings	0	24
10 wickets in match	0	5
Best bowling	2/65	8/43
Catches/stumpings	0/–	41/–
- Source: CricInfo, 3 June 2022

Adwai Raghuram Bhat (born 16 April 1958) is a former Indian cricketer who played in two Test matches in 1983. He was born in Puttur, Dakshina Kannada to a family of Havyaka Brahmins

== Domestic career ==
Raghuram Bhat dominated school and junior level games. After some fine performances, he made his Ranji trophy debut in the 1979–80 season against Tamil Nadu at the M. Chinnaswamy Stadium. He had a slow start to his career taking just one wicket on his debut game. He soon found success at the Ranji level. In just his 6th first class game he picked up 9 wickets against Kerala at Davangere. In the quarterfinal against Punjab he took 9 wickets to help Karnataka reach the semifinals.

== 1981-82 Semifinal ==
Raghuram Bhat is chiefly remembered for the role he played in Karnataka's victory in the semifinal against Bombay. The 1981-82 Ranji semifinal was played between a strong Bombay team and Karnataka at the M. Chinnaswamy Stadium. Bombay had at their disposal some of the then current stars of the Indian cricket team, including Sunil Gavaskar, Dilip Vengsarkar, Ashok Mankad, Sandeep Patil, Ravi Shastri and Balwinder Sandhu.

Sunil Gavaskar captaining Bombay won the toss and decided to bat. Gavaskar opened the batting with Ghulam Parkar and put on a 62 run opening stand. Raghuram Bhat soon got into the act and dismissed Gavaskar for 41. He then had Vengsarkar bowled for 8. A 101 run partnership was established between Ghulam Parkar and Sandeep Patil. Raghuram Bhat got Ghulam Parkar Leg before the wicket. That bought Ashok Mankad to the crease. Raghuram Bhat had Mankad edge the ball to Gundappa Viswanath at slip to leave Bombay at 184 for 5. Raghuram Bhat completed his hat-trick by dismissing Suru Nayak. Raguram Bhat went on to claim 3 more wickets as he ended up with his then best figures of 8 for 123. Bombay was dismissed for 271.

Karnataka batted well in their first innings. A fine century from Sudhakar Rao and a knock of 78 from Brijesh Patel ensured Karnataka overhauled Bombay's first innings total. Some fine late order batting from Syed Kirmani and Raghuram Bhat ensured Karnataka reached 470.

The pitch by then had deteriorated and was expected to help spin. Ghulam Parkar and Vengsarkar opened the batting for Bombay in the 2nd innings and put on 72. Bhat dismissed Vengsarkar and soon had Suru Nayak giving him a return catch to leave Bombay at 107 for 2. Bhat and fellow spinner B. Vijayakrishna went through the middle order to leave Bombay at 160 for 6. Sunil Gavaskar unusually walked to bat at number 8 and soon faced trouble from the spin of Raghuram Bhat. Gavaskar had earlier decided to bat left handed against Bhat, but was talked out of it by Bombay team manager Sharad Diwadkar. Sensing that he had no chance against Bhat, Sunil Gavaskar decided to bat as a left-hander against him. Sunil Gavaskar survived against Bhat batting as a left-hander and against Vijaykrishna batting as a right-hander. Gavaskar batted over 60 minutes as a left-hander and ensured Bombay did not lose outright. Bombay ended up at 200 for 9. Karnataka went through to the final based on the big first innings lead. Raghuram Bhat ended up with 13 wickets.

== After the Semifinal ==
Karnataka lost the final to Delhi despite scoring 705 in the first innings. The next Ranji season proved to be fruitful for Bhat as helped Karnataka win the Ranji trophy for the 3rd time, beating Bombay on first innings lead. He took 4 wickets in the final and capped off a wonderful Ranji trophy campaign. He played in the Irani Trophy that year and picked up 7 wickets in the game. His performances in the season bought him into the national limelight and he was selected for the upcoming series against Pakistan.

== International career ==
Raghuram Bhat played his first test against Pakistan at Vidarbha Cricket Association Ground, Nagpur. His first test wicket was Javed Miandad. He later picked up Mudassar Nazar's wicket as well. India drew the game and the series was shared between the 2 arch rivals. Raghuram Bhat's next test was against the West Indies at the Green Park Stadium in Kanpur. Bhat picked up the wickets of Clive Lloyd and Gus Logie. India lost the test by an innings and 83 runs. This test also marked the end of Bhat's international career as he was dropped from the Indian team.

== Later domestic career ==
Raghuram Bhat was one of the stalwarts for Karnataka. He along with B. Vijayakrishna bore the bulk of the bowling workload of Karnataka. He ended up with 343 wickets in the Ranji Trophy. He retired after the 1992-93 pre-quarter final against Madhya Pradesh

== After cricket ==
Since he retired from first-class cricket Bhatt has served in many capacities - as umpire, administrator and coach. In July 2011, he was appointed as the coach of the Goa cricket team.

== In popular culture ==
A reference is made to the incident where Sunil Gavaskar batted left handed against Raghuram Bhat in the Kannada movie Ganeshana Maduve.
