= Mark Teversham =

Indian cricketer

Personal information
- Full name: Mark Symonds Teversham
- Born: 5 April 1895; Myingyan, Burma
- Died: 15 November 1973 (aged 78); Gosport, Hampshire, England

Domestic team information
- Years: Team
- 1934/35: Mysore

Career statistics
Competition	First-class
Matches	1
Runs scored	11
Batting average	5.50
100s/50s	0/0
Top score	11
Catches/stumpings	1/–
- Source: ESPNcricinfo, 7 April 2020

Mark Symonds Teversham (5 April 1895 – 15 November 1973) was a soldier and cricketer. He captained Mysore in the first ever Ranji Trophy match in 1934–35.

In his professional career, he served in the British Indian Army from 1915 to 1947 and retired as a Brigadier.
