= John Maples (cricketer) =

English cricketer and British Army officer

Personal information
- Full name: John Saxby Maples
- Born: 24 October 1913; Hackney, Middlesex, England
- Died: 26 July 1958 (aged 44); Marlborough, Wiltshire, England
- Batting: Unknown
- Bowling: Unknown

Domestic team information
- Years: Team
- 1944/45: Mysore
- 1951–1953: Wiltshire

Career statistics
Competition	First-class
Matches	1
Runs scored	5
Batting average	2.50
100s/50s	–/–
Top score	5
Balls bowled	6
Wickets	0
Bowling average	–
5 wickets in innings	–
10 wickets in match	–
Best bowling	–
Catches/stumpings	–/–
- Source: ESPNcricinfo, 28 June 2019

John Saxby Maples (24 October 1913 – 26 July 1958) was an English first-class cricketer and British Army officer.

Maples was born at Hackney in November 1913. He was educated at Marlborough College, where he served in the Marlborough College contingent of the Officers' Training Corps as a second lieutenant. He served in the Second World War with the Wiltshire Regiment. While serving in British India he made a first-class cricket appearance for Mysore against Madras at Madras in the 1944–45 Ranji Trophy. Batting twice in the match, he was dismissed without scoring by Commandur Rangachari in Mysore's first-innings, while in their second-innings he was dismissed for 5 runs by Ram Singh. Following the war he returned to England, where he began studying at Clare College, Cambridge. He was promoted to the rank of lieutenant in April 1950. Maples also played minor counties cricket for Wiltshire between 1951–53, making nineteen appearances in the Minor Counties Championship. He died at Marlborough in July 1958.
