= M. R. Srinivasaprasad =

Indian cricketer (born 1959)

Madapusi Raghavan Srinivasaprasad, usually known as M. R. Srinivas Prasad (born in 1959 in Salem, Tamil Nadu) is a right-handed batsman and a right-arm off-spin bowler who played cricket for Karnataka Ranji in the Wills Trophy (1983/84 – 1987/88), and the Deodhar Trophy (1984/85). He represented Young India in Zimbabwe (1983/84). His first-class span was from 1979/80 to 1987/88 in which he scored 3031 runs over 53 matches.

He was part of the Managing Committee of KSCA since November 2010 to November 2013.

== Career outside cricket ==
M.R.Srinivas Prasad is an Electronics Engineer with a management degree. He has held many leadership roles across various industries. He is presently the CEO of Philips Innovation Campus, Bangalore.

- Manager – Alcatel Business Systems, Paris.
- General Manager, Head – Sony Software Development Center, Bangalore.
- Vice President – IT – Fidelity Investments, Bangalore.
- CEO @ Philips Innovation Campus, Bangalore.
- Board of Directors Philips HomeCo, India.
- Chairman, Philips India Provident fund and Gratuity Trust.
- Member of the Industry Advisory Board IIIT, Bangalore (Present)
- Member of CII National Committee of Technology and R&D (Present)
