= D.R. Bendre Cricket Stadium =

Cricket stadium in India

- Interactive map of D.R. Bendre Cricket Stadium

Ground information
- Location: Hubli, Karnataka
- Country: India
- Coordinates: 15°22′12″N 75°7′40″E
- Establishment: 2012
- Capacity: 16,000
- Owner: Karnataka State Cricket Association
- Operator: Karnataka State Cricket Association
- Tenants: Karnataka; Shamanur Davangere Diamonds; Hubli Tigers

International information
- As of 18 May 2015; Source: ESPNcricinfo

D. R. Bendre Cricket Stadium, also known as Rajnagar Cricket Stadium and KSCA Stadium, is a cricket stadium in Rajnagar in the city of Hubli, in Karnataka, India. The stadium was completed in 2012 and serves as the second home ground for the Karnataka cricket team. It was inaugurated by the former Chief Minister of Karnataka Jagadish Shettar in November 2012. The ground is named after the Kannada poet and Jnanpith Award winner D. R. Bendre.

In October 2013, the stadium hosted the third unofficial test match between India A and West Indies A, which Cheteshwar Pujara scored a triple-century and India A won by an innings and 51 runs. In February 2026 the ground hosted the 2025–26 Ranji Trophy final between Karnataka and Jammu & Kashmir.

The stadium is the home ground for Karnataka Premier League team Hubli Tigers.

== See also ==
- M Chinnaswamy Stadium
- Hubli Tigers
- Karnataka State Cricket Association
- Shamanur Davangere Diamonds
