= Vedam Hariharan =

Indian cricketer (born 1954)

Personal information
- Born: 5 June 1954 (age 72); Cochin, Kerala, India
- Nickname: Hari
- Batting: Right-handed
- Bowling: Right-arm medium
- Role: Bowler

Domestic team information
- Years: Team
- 1974/75: Karnataka
- 1980/81–1989/90: Kerala

Career statistics
Competition	FC
Matches	42
Runs scored	926
Batting average	16.53
100s/50s	1/1
Top score	103
Balls bowled	5,982
Wickets	114
Bowling average	32.06
5 wickets in innings	3
10 wickets in match	1
Best bowling	7/60
Catches/stumpings	15/–
- Source: ESPNcricinfo, 28 November 2015

Vedam Hariharan (born 5 June 1954) is a former Indian first-class cricketer who played for Karnataka cricket team and Kerala cricket team. After retirement, he became a cricket coach.

== Career ==
A right-arm medium pace swing bowler, Hariharan represented Karnataka cricket team in one match in the 1974/75 season before playing for his home team Kerala cricket team between 1980/81 and 1989/90. He appeared in 42 first-class cricket matches but did not play List A cricket. Former India cricketer Kapil Dev in his autobiography mentioned that Hariharan had more talent than he himself did.

After his playing career, Hariharan took up the job of coaching. In 1990, he became a cricket coach and worked for several years in Australia, England, India, Ireland, Malaysia and Scotland. In the 1990s, Hariharan became a player-coach with the Scottish team Glasgow Accies in the Western Union League and continued in that role for over a decade. He also trained cricketers at cricket academies in Brisbane and Bangalore during his stint with Glasgow Accies. He worked as a coach at the Glasgow Academy in Scotland and was accredited as a Level 3 coach from the England and Wales Cricket Board. In 2007, the Kerala Cricket Association appointed him as the head coach of the Kerala team for the 2007/08 domestic season. Hariharan was replaced from the position in 2009 following which he served the Kerala Cricket Association with a legal notice claiming his term as coach was to end after the 2010/11 season.
