= Gangotri Glades Stadium =

Cricket stadium

Coordinates: 12.31242°N 76.62572°E

Srikantadatta Narasimha Raja Wadiyar Ground
- Gangothri Glades Stadium
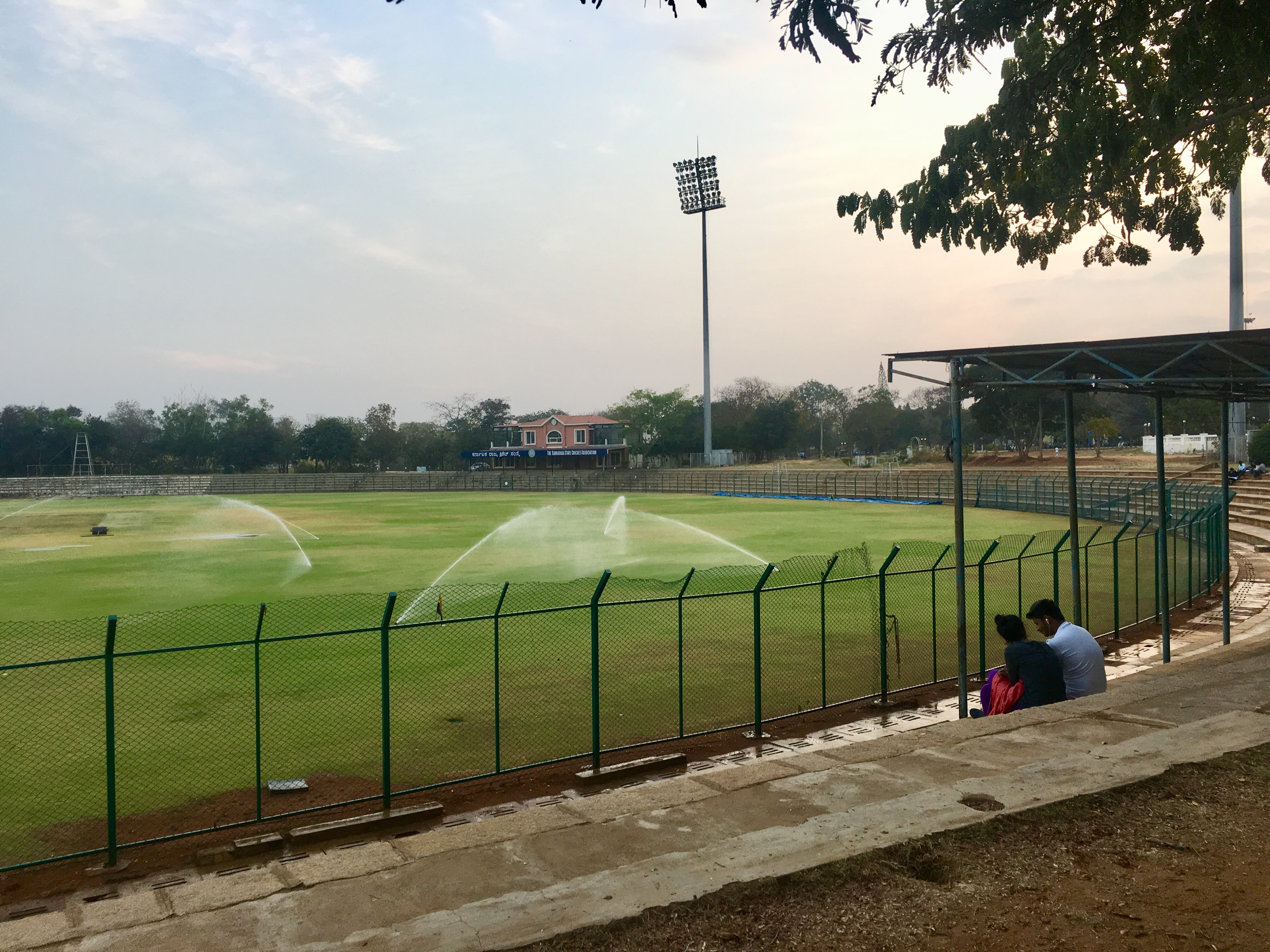
- Interactive map of Srikantadatta Narasimha Raja Wadiyar Ground

Ground information
- Location: Mysuru
- Country: India
- Establishment: 1997
- Capacity: 15,000
- Owner: University of Mysore
- Operator: Karnataka State Cricket Association
- Tenants: Karnataka cricket team
- End names
- Coffee Board End; Hunsur Road End

International information
- Only women's Test: 16–19 November 2014: India v South Africa
- Only women's ODI: 10 December 1997: Pakistan v Denmark
- As of 10 January 2020; Source: Srikantadatta Narasimha Raja Wadeyar Ground

The Srikantadatta Narasimharaja Wadiyar Ground, commonly known as Gangotri Glades Stadium (Kannada: ಗಂಗೋತ್ರಿ ಗ್ಲೇಡ್ಸ್) and formerly known as the University of Mysore Platinum Jubilee Cricket Stadium, is a cricket stadium located in the Manasagangotri campus of the University of Mysore in the southern Indian city of Mysore, Karnataka, named after Prince Srikantadatta Wadiyar.

The Chamundi hills provides an idyllic backdrop, and the iconic Kukkarahalli lake is just a big-hit away. It has a seating capacity of about 15,000. It was constructed by the University of Mysore.

In 1997, the Karnataka State Cricket Association entered into a 20-year agreement with the university to develop and maintain the ground as part of its efforts to promote the game in smaller centres. It was in 2007 that a new pavilion complex was constructed and the stadium got a facelift, making it fit to host Ranji Trophy matches.

This ground is the second home ground for the Karnataka Cricket Team after the M.Chinnaswamy Stadium. This ground is covered with Bermuda Grass.

== History and development ==
The University of Mysore needed a quality cricket ground in Mysore. Nadig Constructions took up the Earth Moving and Ground Creation Activities and completed in 1993. This Ground was Inaugurated on 20 July 1993 by Karnataka Sports Council Chairman Prakash Padukone, BCCI Secretary C Nagaraj, KSCA Vice President Kasturi rangan, KSCA Mysore Zonal Committee Member Satyanarayana S Nadig, Minister for Higher education S M Yahya, University of Mysore Vice Chancelleor Dr. M Madaiah, University of Mysore Registrar Evaluation A K Monnappa, Former Test Cricketer Syed Kirmani, Varsity Senate Member Venkatesh, University of Mysore registrar Pattanayak, Karnataka State Cricket team Captain Karthik Jeswanth and Ideal Jawa Cricketer V Prabhakar.

Ground was later upgraded to stadium in 1996/1997, just in time for the 1997 Women's Cricket World Cup and hosted a game between Denmark women and Pakistan women and later Karnataka State Cricket Association made a 20-year deal to maintain and develop this ground.This wicket is most suitable for batsmen but also provides assistance to bowlers with its pace and bounce. Many games, which are held here are high scoring games but records show that Fast Bowlers have excelled here.

First there is some swing and pace on the track and bowlers have an advantage, but as the game progresses it suits the batsmen.

== Matches held ==
The most notable match held here was the 2009–10 Ranji Trophy Final between Mumbai and Karnataka in which Mumbai won by 6 runs in a close game. It has also hosted an International Women's Cricket Match between Denmark and Pakistan in 1997. It also hosts various tournaments such as Karnataka Premier League, Ranji Trophy, Duleep Trophy, Vinoo Mankad Trophy, Cooch Behar Trophy and CK Nayudu Trophy. It is one of the most important stadiums in Karnataka so various tournaments are held here and people throng to watch these matches. This ground is yet to host a men's International match but has hosted many games for India A against various other "A" team opponents. The Knockout stages of Vinoo Mankad Trophy was also held here.

== Ranji Trophy ==
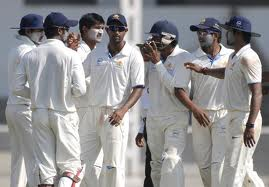
Karnataka Cricket Team

No.	Date	Home	Away	Winner	Margin
1	1–4 December 2006	Karnataka	Haryana	Karnataka	253 runs
2	1–4 December 2007	Karnataka	Rajasthan	draw	–
3	16–19 November 2008	Karnataka	Andhra Pradesh	Karnataka	202 runs
4	17–20 November 2009	Karnataka	Bengal	draw	–
5	24–27 December 2009	Karnataka	Punjab	draw	–
6	11–14 January 2010	Karnataka	Mumbai	Mumbai	6 runs
7	8–11 December 2010	Karnataka	Baroda	draw	–
8	15 December 2012	Karnataka	Vidarbha	draw	–
9	7–10 November 2015	Karnataka	Odisha		
10		Mumbai	Railways		
11		Uttar Pradesh	Mumbai		
12		Karnataka	Assam		

== Karnataka Premier League(KPL) ==
No	Team 1	Team 2	Winner	Margin	Date
1	Rockstars	Mangalore United	Mangalore United	253 runs	1-12-2006
2	Karnataka	Rajasthan	draw	1-12-2007	
3	Karnataka	Andhra Pradesh	Karnataka	202 runs	16-11-2008
4	Karnataka	Bengal		17-11-2009	
5	Karnataka	Punjab	24-12-2009		
6	Karnataka	Mumbai	Mumbai	6 runs	11-1-2010
7	Karnataka	Baroda		8-12-2010	
8	Karnataka	Vidarbha		15-12-2012	

== Vinoo Mankad Trophy 2011/12 ==
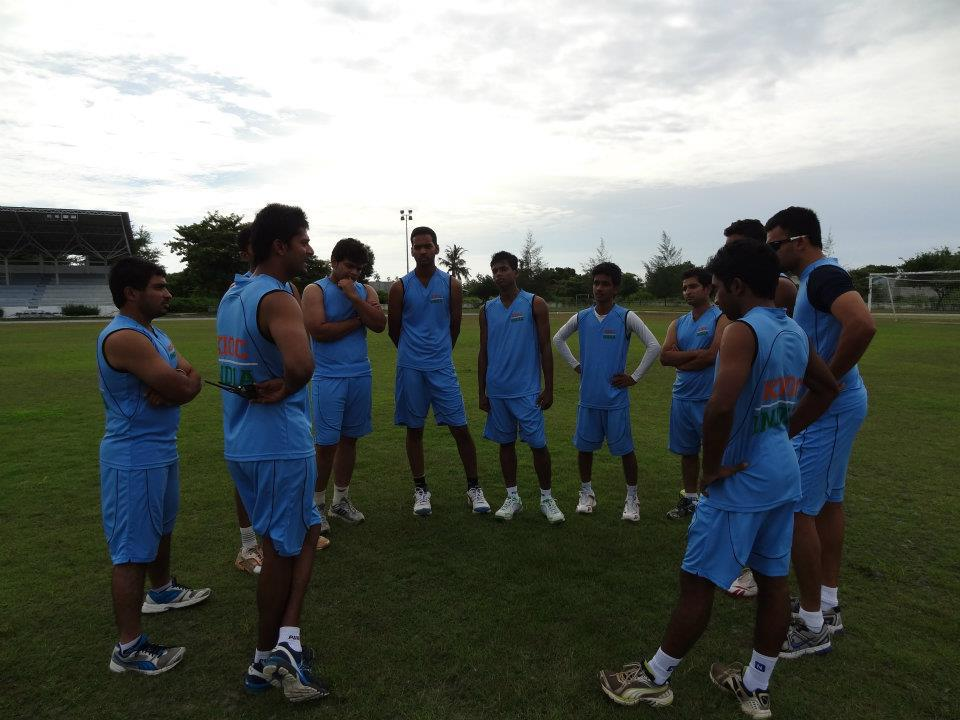
Practise session of U19 players

Pre-Quarter-Final-Karnataka Under-19s v Gujarat Under-19s=Karnataka Under-19s won by 12 runs

Quarter-Final-Bengal Under-19s v Madhya Pradesh Under-19s=Madhya Pradesh Under-19s won by 9 wickets

Quarter-Final-Punjab Under-19s v Uttar Pradesh Under-19s=Uttar Pradesh Under-19s won by 5 wickets

Semi-Final-Delhi Under-19s v Madhya Pradesh Under-19s=Madhya Pradesh Under-19s won by 7 wickets

Final- Madhya Pradesh Under-19s v Uttar Pradesh Under-19s=Uttar Pradesh Under-19s won by 44 runs

== Records ==
Lowest Score=65-Pakistan women vs Denmark women

Highest Score=619/8 dec-Karnataka vs Vidarbha

Highest Individual Score=257-CM Gautam vs Vidarbha

Best Bowling Figures in innings=6/51-P Vijaykumar vs Karnataka

Best Bowling Figures in match=10/108-Sunil Joshi vs Rajasthan

Most Wicket-keeper Dismissals in Innings=6-VST Naidu vs Andhra Pradesh

Most Wicket-keeper Dismissals in Match=9-VST Naidu vs Andhra Pradesh

Most Fielder Catches in Innings in first-class cricket=4-RV Uthappa vs Rajasthan

Most Fielder Catches in Match in first-class cricket=5-RV Uthappa vs Rajasthan

Highest Partnership=272-KL Rahul & CM Gautam vs Vidarbha

All-time Highest Run Scorer=621-RV Uthappa

All-time Highest Wicket taker=37-Sunil Joshi

== Centurions ==
Score	Player	For	Against	Season	First Class No
257	CM Gautam	Karnataka	Vidarbha	2012/13	54421
157	Amit Verma	Karnataka	Bengal	2009/10	51990
157	KL Rahul	Karnataka	Vidarbha	2012/13	54421
144	Manish Pandey	Karnataka	Mumbai	2009/10	52196
137	AV Ubarhande	Vidarbha	Karnataka	2012/13	54421
134	KB Pawan	Karnataka	Bengal	2009/10	51990
133	Robin Uthappa	Karnataka	Andhra Pradesh	2008/09	51091
115	Manish Pandey	Karnataka	Punjab	2009/10	52172
110*	Yere Goud	Karnataka	Rajasthan	2007/08	50438
108	Robin Uthappa	Karnataka	Haryana	2006/07	49658
108*	CM Gautam	Karnataka	Bengal	2009/10	51990
107	RB Banerjee	Bengal	Karnataka	2009/10	51990
