= V. Krishnaprasad =

Indian cricketer (1946–2015)

Personal information
- Born: 19 September 1946
- Died: 27 November 2015 (aged 69); Bangalore, India
- Source: Cricinfo, 22 March 2016

V. Krishnaprasad (19 September 1946 – 27 November 2015) was an Indian cricketer. He played one first-class match for Mysore in 1969/70.

== See also ==
- List of Karnataka cricketers
