= Sharad Rao (cricketer) =

Indian cricketer (1957–2017)

Personal information
- Full name: Sharad Gururaj Rao
- Born: 21 March 1957; Bombay, Maharashtra
- Died: 2 September 2017 (aged 60)
- Bowling: Right-arm medium

Domestic team information
- Years: Team
- 1980–1981: Bombay
- 1982–1986: Karnataka

Career statistics
Competition	FC
Matches	10
Runs scored	118
Batting average	19.66
100s/50s	0/0
Top score	40
Balls bowled	834
Wickets	16
Bowling average	33.81
5 wickets in innings	0
10 wickets in match	0
Best bowling	4/27
Catches/stumpings	4/–
- Source: Cricinfo, 9 May 2021

Sharad Rao (21 March 1957 – 2 September 2017) was an Indian cricketer. He played in ten first-class and three List A matches from 1980/81 to 1985/86, including the final of the 1980–81 Ranji Trophy.

== See also ==
- List of Mumbai cricketers
- List of Karnataka cricketers
