= Karnataka Premier League =

Indian cricket league

- Countries: India
- Administrator: Karnataka State Cricket Association
- Headquarters: Bengaluru, Karnataka
- Format: Twenty20
- First edition: 2009/10
- Latest edition: 2019
- Tournament format: Round-robin & playoffs
- Number of teams: 7
- Current champion: Bijapur Bulls (2nd titles)
- Most successful: Bijapur Bulls (2 titles)
- Website: www.kpl.cricket

Karnataka Premier League was an Indian Twenty20 cricket league established by the Karnataka State Cricket Association (KSCA) in August 2009 and modelled after the Indian Premier League (IPL). KPL created history during 2017 by reaching 1.5 crore people with the help of a Digital Marketing Company named Popupster.

It was replaced by Maharaja Trophy KSCA T20 in 2022 due to betting and match fixing scandals.

== Teams ==
As of 2023 the tournament uses a franchise model with teams allocated after a bidding process.

Team	Captain	Owner(s)
Bangalore Brigadiers	Deepak Chougule	Brigade Enterprises
Provident Bangalore	Balachandra Akhil	Melmont Constructions
Mangalore United	Bharat Chipli	Fiza Developers
Belagavi Panthers	Jagadeesh Arunkumar	Gaames Merchandise Pvt Ltd
Shamanur Davangere Diamonds	Sunil Joshi	Shamanuru Shivashankarappa
Bijapur Bulls	SP Shinde	Vivid kreations
Mysuru Warriors	Manish Pandey	NR Group
Namma Shivamogga	Stuart Binny	R Kumar (Cosmic IT Groups)
Rockstars	Sudeep	Karbonn Mobiles
Bellary Tuskers	C. Raghu	Arvind Reddy
Hubli Tigers		Sushil Jindal & Abhishek Jindal
Bengaluru Blasters		Kalyani Motors

Location of KPL teams

== Tournament seasons and results ==
Season	Teams	Final's venue	Winner	Margin	Runner-up
2009	8	M Chinnaswamy Stadium, Bengaluru	Provident Bangalore; 125/5 (19.2 overs)	5 wickets Scorecard	Belagavi Panthers; 122/7 (20 overs)
2010	8	M Chinnaswamy Stadium, Bengaluru	Mangalore United; 112/9 (20 overs)	44 runs Scorecard	Provident Bangalore; 68 all out (16.1 overs)
2011	Not played				
2012	Not played				
2013	Not played				
2014	7	D.R. Bendre Cricket Stadium, Hubballi	Mysore Warriors; 174/4 (19.5 overs)	6 wickets Scorecard	Belagavi Panthers; 170/7 (20 overs)
2015	8	Gangothri Glades Cricket Ground, Mysuru	Bijapur Bulls; 115/3 (17.1 overs)	7 wickets Scorecard	Hubli Tigers; 114/9 (20 overs)
2016	8	D.R. Bendre Cricket Stadium, Hubballi	Bellary Tuskers; 189/5 (20 overs)	35 runs Scorecard	Hubli Tigers; 154/9 (20 overs)
2017	7	D.R. Bendre Cricket Stadium, Hubballi	Belagavi Panthers; 145/4 (17.3 overs)	6 wickets Scorecard	Bijapur Bulls; 141/7 (20 overs)
2018	7	Srikantadatta Narasimha Raja Wadeyar Ground, Mysuru	Bijapur Bulls; 106/3 (13.5 overs)	7 wickets Scorecard	Bengaluru Blasters; 101 all out (20 overs)
2019	7	Srikantadatta Narasimha Raja Wadeyar Ground,	Hubli Tigers; 152/6 (20.0)	8 runs Scorecard	Bellary Tuskers; 144 all out (20 overs)

== Teams' performances ==
Season (No. of teams)	2009 (8)	2010 (8)	2014 (7)	2015 (8)	2016 (8)	2017 (7)	2018 (7)	2019 (7)
Bangalore Brigadiers	SF	8th	–					
Belagavi Panthers	RU	5th	RU	SF	SF	C	5th	PO
Bellary Tuskers	–		6th	5th	C	6th	6th	RU
Bengaluru Blasters	–					7th	RU	7th
Bijapur Bulls	SF	7th	SF	C	5th	RU	C	6th
Hubli Tigers	–		5th	RU	RU	SF	SF	C
Malnad Gladiators/Namma Shivamogga/Shivamogga Lions	8th	SF	–	6th	6th	SF	7th	PO
Mangalore United	6th	C	SF	SF	7th	–		
Mysore Maharaajas/Mysuru Warriors	5th	6th	C	7th	SF	5th	SF	5th
Provident Bangalore	C	RU	–					
Rockstars	–		7th	8th	7th	–		
Shamanur Davangere Diamonds	7th	SF	–					

== Statistics ==
=== Highest team score ===
Score	Team	Opposition	Venue	Date
245/6	Hubli Tigers	Rockstars	D.R. Bendre Cricket Stadium, Hubli	10 September 2014
241/7	Mysuru Warriors	Bellary Tuskers	Srikantadatta Narasimha Raja Wadeyar Ground, Mysore	26 August 2019
240/2	Bellary Tuskers	Mysuru Warriors	Srikantadatta Narasimha Raja Wadeyar Ground, Mysore	26 August 2019
228/5	Bengaluru Blasters	Belagavi Panthers	M. Chinnaswamy Stadium, Bangalore	15 August 2018
219/4	Mysuru Warriors	Rockstars	D.R. Bendre Cricket Stadium, Hubli	18 September 2016

Source- ESPNcricinfo

=== Lowest team score ===
Score	Team	Opposition	Venue	Date
52	Mysuru Warriors	Namma Shivamogga	D.R. Bendre Cricket Stadium, Hubli	19 September 2017
61	Malnad Gladiators	Mysuru Maharajaas	M. Chinnaswamy Stadium, Bangalore	16 September 2009
68	Provident Bangalore	Mangalore United	M. Chinnaswamy Stadium, Bangalore	29 September 2010
78	Rockstars	Bellary Tuskers	D.R. Bendre Cricket Stadium, Hubli	10 September 2015
81	Bangalore Brigadiers	Mangalore United	M. Chinnaswamy Stadium, Bangalore	25 September 2010

Source- ESPNcricinfo

=== Most career runs ===
Runs	Player	Innings	Seasons
1430	Bharat Chipli	55	2009-19
1419	Mayank Agarwal	41	2009-17
1341	Mohammed Taha	45	2014-19
1252	Raju Bhatkal	53	2009-19
1222	Vinay Kumar	53	2009-19

Source- ESPNcricinfo

=== Highest individual score ===
Runs	Player	Team	Opposition	Venue	Date
134*	Krishnappa Gowtham	Bellary Tuskers	Shivamogga Lions	M. Chinnaswamy Stadium, Bangalore	23 August 2019
125	Aniruddha Joshi	Mysuru Warriors	Bellary Tuskers	Srikantadatta Narasimha Raja Wadeyar Ground, Mysore	26 August 2019
119*	Mayank Agarwal	Belagavi Panthers	Mangalore United	D.R. Bendre Cricket Stadium, Hubli	29 September 2015
112*	Manish Pandey	Belagavi Panthers	Mangalore United	M. Chinnaswamy Stadium, Bangalore	14 September 2009
108*	Stalin Hoover	Belagavi Panthers	Shivamogga Lions	Srikantadatta Narasimha Raja Wadeyar Ground, Mysore	25 August 2019

Source- ESPNcricinfo

=== Most career sixes ===
Sixes	Player	Innings	Seasons
65	Mohammed Taha	45	2014-19
64	Bharat Chipli	55	2009-19
58	Aniruddha Joshi	49	2009-19
55	Mayank Agarwal	41	2009-17
49	Mohanram Nidesh	53	2009-19

Source- ESPNcricinfo

=== Most runs in a season ===
Runs	Player	Team	Season
414	Mayank Agarwal	Belagavi Panthers	2016
358	Mohammed Taha	Hubli Tigers	2016
347	KL Rahul	Hubli Tigers	2014
338	Sadiq Kirmani	Namma Shivamogga	2015
326	J. Arunkumar	Belagavi Panthers	2009

Source- ESPNcricinfo

=== Most career wickets ===
Wickets	Player	Innings	Seasons
73	Krishnappa Gowtham	47	2009-19
62	Vijaykumar Vyshak	39	2014-19
57	Jagadeesha Suchith	41	2014-19
56	Vinay Kumar	51	2009-19
45	Amit Verma	48	2009-19

Source- ESPNcricinfo

=== Best bowling figures ===
Figures	Player	Team	Opposition	Venue	Date
8/15	Krishnappa Gowtham	Bellary Tuskers	Shivamogga Lions	M. Chinnaswamy Stadium, Bangalore	23 August 2019
6/11	Nikin Jose	Mysuru Warriors	Rockstars	Srikantadatta Narasimha Raja Wadeyar Ground, Mysore	17 September 2015
5/17	Dilp Sagar	Bangalore Brigadiers	Mysuru Maharajaas	Srikantadatta Narasimha Raja Wadeyar Ground, Mysore	18 September 2009
5/20	Jagadeesha Suchith	Mysuru Warriors	Bellary Tuskers	D.R. Bendre Cricket Stadium, Hubli	7 September 2015
5/20	Abhishek Bhat	Bengaluru Blasters	Hubli Tigers	Srikantadatta Narasimha Raja Wadeyar Ground, Mysore	6 September 2017

Source- ESPNcricinfo

=== Most wickets in a season ===
Wickets	Player	Team	Season
21	Krishnappa Gowtham	Bellary Tuskers	2019
17	David Johnson	Belagavi Panthers	2009
16	K. C. Cariappa	Bijapur Bulls	2015
16	Jagadeesha Suchith	Mysuru Warriors	2014
16	Udit Patel	Mangalore United	2010
16	Krishnappa Gowtham	Malnad Gladiators	2010

Source- ESPNcricinfo

=== Highest partnership ===
Runs	Wicket	Batters		Team	Opposition	Venue	Date
169	1st wicket	Anurag Bhajpai	Mayank Agarwal	Belagavi Panthers	Mangalore United	D.R. Bendre Cricket Stadium, Hubli	29 September 2016
168	1st wicket	Thilak Naidu	Manjunath	Provident Bangalore	Mangalore United	M. Chinnaswamy Stadium, Bangalore	9 September 2009
162	1st wicket	Rohit Sabharwal	Karun Nair	Mangalore United	Bijapur Bulls	Srikantadatta Narasimha Raja Wadeyar Ground, Mysore	31 August 2014
160	2nd wicket	Shyam Ponnappa	Manish Pandey	Belagavi Panthers	Mangalore United	M. Chinnaswamy Stadium, Bangalore	14 September 2009
152	1st wicket	Abhishek Reddy	Mayank Agarwal	Hubli Tigers	Namma Shivamogga	Srikantadatta Narasimha Raja Wadeyar Ground, Mysore	8 September 2017

Source- ESPNcricinfo
