= Rakesh Solanki =

Indian cricketer (born 1985)

Personal information
- Full name: Rakesh Kantibhai Solanki
- Born: 1 June 1985 (age 41); Vadodara, Gujarat, India
- Batting: Left-handed
- Bowling: Right arm off-break
- Role: Batsman

Domestic team information
- Years: Team
- 2002/03–present: Baroda

Career statistics
Competition	FC	LA	T20
Matches	78	39	16
Runs scored	4121	1046	391
Batting average	34.63	29.88	27.92
100s/50s	6/28	0/9	0/2
Top score	186	94	76
Balls bowled	279	18	–
Wickets	10	0	–
Bowling average	42.20	–	–
5 wickets in innings	0	–	–
10 wickets in match	0	–	–
Best bowling	3/73	–	–
Catches/stumpings	37/-	9/–	6/–
- Source: Cricinfo, 15 January 2013

Rakesh Solanki (born 1 June 1985) is an Indian cricketer who plays for Baroda in domestic cricket. He is a left-hand batsman and occasional off-break bowler. He made his first-class debut for Baroda in the 2002/03 season.
