= Udit Patel =

Indian cricketer (born 1984)

Personal information
- Full name: Udit Brijesh Patel
- Born: 31 August 1984 (age 42); Vadodara, Gujarat, India
- Batting: Right-handed
- Bowling: Right-arm off break
- Relatives: Brijesh Patel (father)

Domestic team information
- Years: Team
- 2002-2010, 2014-2016: Karnataka
- 2011-2013: Tripura
- Source: ESPNcricinfo, 14 January 2022

Udit Brijesh Patel (born August 31, 1984) is an Indian former first-class cricketer who represented Karnataka and Tripura in domestic cricket. A right-arm off-break bowler and right-handed lower-order batsman, he was also a member of the Royal Challengers Bangalore (RCB) squad in the Indian Premier League (IPL). He is the son of Brijesh Patel, a former Indian international cricketer and prominent sports administrator.

== Early Life and Background ==
Born in Baroda (now Vadodara), Gujarat, Udit was raised in a cricketing family. His father, Brijesh Patel, earned 21 Test caps for India and later served as the Chairman of the National Selection Committee and the IPL Governing Council [5]. Udit's early promise was evident when he was selected for the India Under-19 team in 2002, playing both Under-19 Tests and ODIs [1].

== Domestic and Professional Career ==
Patel made his first-class debut for Karnataka in the 2002–03 season. He remained a mainstay in the squad for several years, contributing to the state's dominance in the Ranji Trophy.

Between 2011 and 2013, he played as a professional for Tripura to gain more consistent game time, before returning to Karnataka for the final years of his career.

Patel was signed by Royal Challengers Bangalore for the 2009 season with a salary of ₹800,000. While his on-field appearances in the IPL were limited, he was a valued member of the spin department during the tournament's early editions.

He played his final first-class match for Karnataka against Odisha in November 2015.
