= Ravi Sehgal =

Indian cricketer (born 1971)

Personal information
- Born: 2 May 1971 (age 55); Delhi, India
- Source: Cricinfo, 10 April 2016

Ravi Sehgal (born 2 May 1971) is an Indian former cricketer. He played eight first-class matches for Delhi between 1993 and 1996.

== See also ==
- List of Delhi cricketers
