= Ranjit Khanwilkar =

Indian cricketer (1960–1988)

Ranjit Khanvilkar
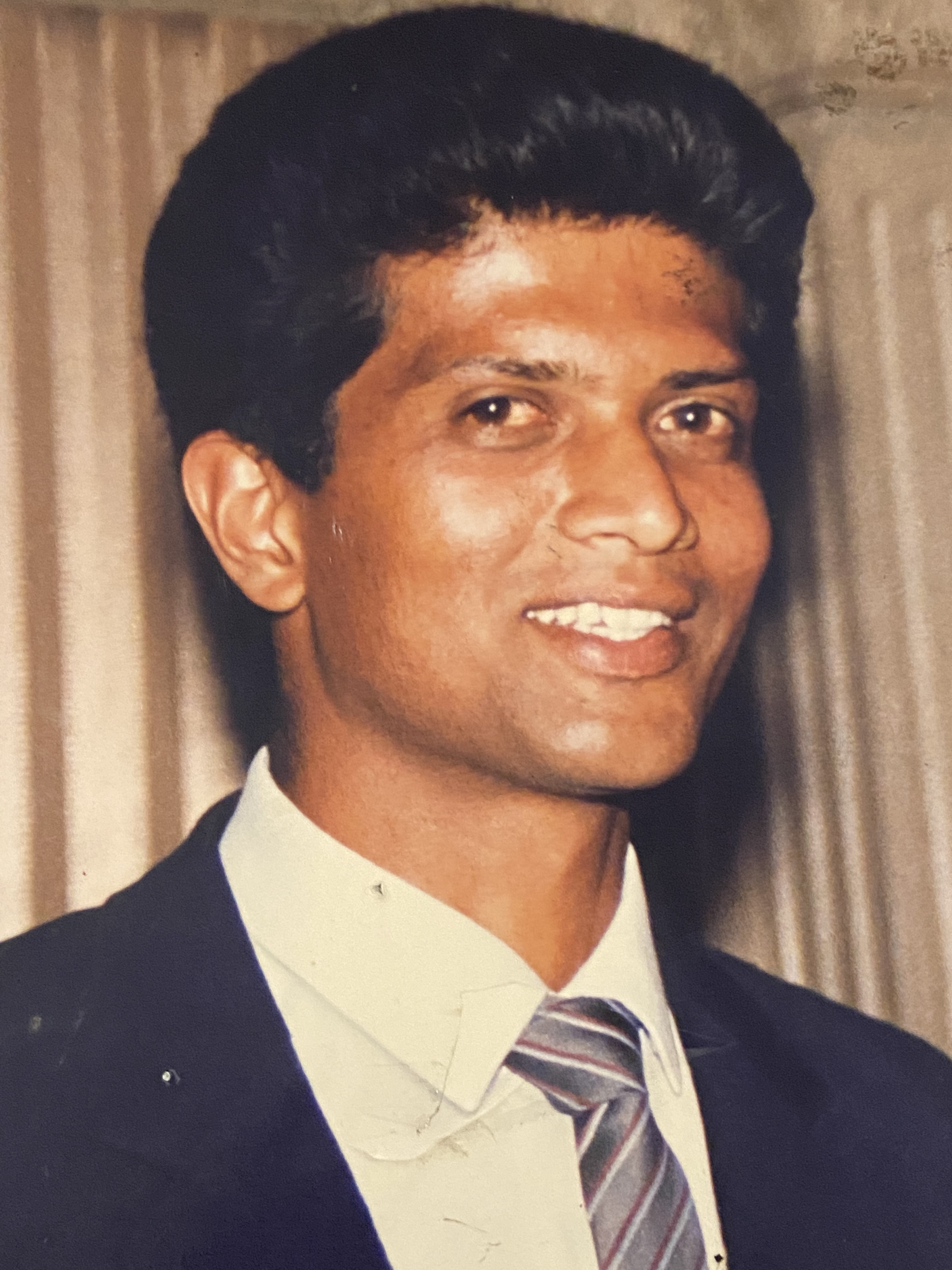

Personal information
- Full name: Ranjit Khanvilkar
- Born: 30 August 1960; Akola, Maharashtra, India
- Died: 8 July 1988 (aged 27); Peruman, Kollam, Kerala
- Batting: Right-handed
- Bowling: Right-arm medium
- Role: All-rounder

Domestic team information
- Years: Team
- 1980–1984: Karnataka
- 1985–1988: Railways

Career statistics
Competition	First-class	LA
Matches	40	11
Runs scored	1,637	181
Batting average	32.74	22.62
100s/50s	3/8	0/1
Top score	156	70
Balls bowled	2,856	402
Wickets	41	12
Bowling average	42.46	29.16
5 wickets in innings	1	0
10 wickets in match	0	0
Best bowling	5/94	5/43
Catches/stumpings	36/–	1/–
- Source: , 7 April 2013

Ranjit Khanvilkar (30 August 1960 – 8 July 1988) was an Indian cricketer who played for Karnataka and Railways as an All-rounder. He died in a train derailment while still an active player.

== Career ==
Khanvilkar was one of the most promising players of Indian domestic cricket. He was one of the six centurions in the final of Ranji Trophy between Delhi versus Karnataka, where Delhi chased Karnataka's total of 705 to win the trophy on first innings lead to make 707/8. In 1983 Ranji trophy final, his knock of 32 helped to gain first innings lead over Bombay helped Karnataka to win the trophy.

== Death ==
His career was cut short when a Bangalore – Kanyakumari Island Express train derailed on the Peruman bridge over Ashtamudi Lake, near Perinadu, Kollam, Kerala, India and fell into the lake. He was one of the 105 people killed.
