= Mohammed Taha =

Indian cricketer (born 1993)

Personal information
- Born: 2 November 1993 (age 33); Bangalore, India
- Batting: Right-handed
- Bowling: Right arm offbreak
- Role: Opening batter

Domestic team information
- Years: Team
- 2015–16: Karnataka
- Source: ESPNcricinfo, 20 November 2016

Mohammed Taha (born 2 November 1993) is an Indian cricketer. He made his Twenty20 debut for Karnataka in the 2015–16 Syed Mushtaq Ali Trophy on 2 January 2016.
