= B. Vijayakrishna =

Indian cricketer (1949–2021)

Personal information
- Born: 12 October 1949; Bangalore, Karnataka, India
- Died: 17 June 2021 (aged 71)
- Nickname: Viji
- Batting: Left-handed
- Bowling: Slow left-arm orthodox
- Role: All-rounder

Domestic team information
- Years: Team
- 1968/69–1983/84: Karnataka

Career statistics
| Competition | First-class | List A |
|---|---|---|
| Matches | 80 | 2 |
| Runs scored | 2,297 | 21 |
| Batting average | 25.80 | 10.50 |
| 100s/50s | 2/16 | 0/0 |
| Top score | 104 | 15 |
| Balls bowled | 13043 | 110 |
| Wickets | 194 | 3 |
| Bowling average | 27.30 | 23.33 |
| 5 wickets in innings | 7 | 0 |
| 10 wickets in match | 1 | 0 |
| Best bowling | 7/85 | 2/36 |
| Catches/stumpings | 76/0 | 0/0 |
- Source: ESPNcricinfo, 26 January 2021

Bharanaiah Vijayakrishna (12 October 1949 – 17 June 2021) was an Indian cricketer who played for Karnataka. In his fifteen-year career as a left arm spinner and a left handed batsman, he played 80 first class matches in which he scored over 2000 runs and took 194 wickets.

== Career ==
Early in his career, Vijayakrishna was encouraged by K. Nagabhushan, a Karnataka cricketer from the late 1960s, who made him bowl with a tennis ball in a car shed. He took three wickets against Hyderabad on his Ranji debut in 1968–69 and six against Madras in the next match. But his career was often interrupted by the presence of the national level spinners B. S. Chandrasekhar and Erapalli Prasanna when they were available to play the Ranji Trophy. He was included in the fourteen for the South Zone team for the Duleep Trophy in 1969 but got his next chance only ten years later.

In the quarter-final against Rajasthan in 1971–72, Vijayakrishna scored 71* with a severe ankle injury. As he could not walk, he was carried all the way to the dressing room. He was dropped from the first four matches of 1975–76 for his "straightforwardness and frank expression of views". Brought back to the side for the quarter-final match against Maharashtra, he scored 66 in the first innings and 102* in 138 minutes in the second that won him the award for the fastest century of the season. His other first class hundred was scored against Bihar in 1977–78.

Against the 1978–79 West Indies team, he took 6/79 and 3/89 to help Karnataka to a famous win. Vijayakrishna retired after the Ranji final against Bombay in 1982–83. He had been part of all three of Karnataka's title wins till then.
