= Board President's XI (India) =

Indian Board President's XI is a first-class cricket team from India. They occasionally play first-class cricket at the domestic level in India. The selected team also participates in practice tour matches against international sides that tour India for international series. In 2008, the Board President's XI team played a tour match against the touring Australian team at the Rajiv Gandhi International Stadium in Hyderabad from 2–5 October. The Board President's XI team was led by Indian batsman Yuvraj Singh in that match. In 2017 they won one of the two 50 overs matches against New Zealand. In 2019 Rohit sharma led the team against South Africa.
