= Sudhakar Rao =

Indian cricketer

Cricket information
- Batting: Right-handed
- Bowling: Right-arm medium
- Source: CricInfo, 6 March 2006

Ramchandra Sudhakar Rao (born 8 August 1952) is a former Indian cricketer. He played domestic cricket for Karnataka and played one One Day International for India against New Zealand in 1976.

== Early career ==
Sudhakar Rao grew up in Basavanagudi and studied at the National School. He stayed close to the ground near his school and would play cricket with tennis ball regularly. The sports secretary of the school, Swamy, saw Sudhakar bat during one of the sessions. Sudhakar was immediately selected in the school team and ordered to play against a rival school. It was the first time Sudhakar was playing on a matting wicket and handling a cricket ball. He made the occasion memorable by scoring a hundred.

Sudhakar Rao subconsciously modelled his batting on Gundappa Viswanath. He was a great admirer of Gundappa Viswanath from his school days and lot of Viswanath's mannerisms rubbed off on him. Sudhakar made his club debut for VV Puram Cricket Club before Viswanath's footsteps and joining him at the Spartans cricket club. Sudhakar scored well for State schools and made his way into the South Zone schools side.

Sudhakar Rao joined APS college Bangalore and while in his final year at college he made his Ranji Trophy debut against Kerala in 1972.

== Ranji career ==
Sudhakar Rao enjoyed the 1975–76 season. He scored 449 runs in 5 innings. He had started the year with a hundred against Rest of India side that included Bishan Singh Bedi at Ahmedabad. The highlight of the season was a double century against Hyderabad. He had received the news that his mother was admitted in the hospital for a mild stroke, but he continued to play. This eventually got him selected to the Indian cricket team for the tour of New Zealand.

== International career ==
Sudhakar Rao was selected for the Indian team on the tour of New Zealand in 1976. He started out with 32 and 25 against Northern Districts at Hamilton. He followed that with 34 and 6 against Otago at Dunedin. He made his one-day international debut against New Zealand at Eden Park. He was run out for 4 as India struggled to chase 236 in 35 overs and never played for India again.

Sudhakar Rao was selected for the following tour of the West Indies. He struggled in the side games and did not score enough runs.

== Later career ==
Sudhakar Rao continued to be a pillar of strength to Karnataka side and was a member of the state squad which won the Ranji Trophy in 1973–74, 1977–78 and 1982–83. When he retired, he had scored 3021 runs at an average of 40.82 in the national competition.

Sudhakar Rao was also the Secretary, Karnataka State Cricket Association.
