= Barrington Rowland =

Indian cricketer

Personal information
- Full name: Barrington Marquis Rowland
- Born: 8 January 1980 (age 46); Bangalore, Karnataka, India
- Batting: Right-handed
- Bowling: Legbreak
- Role: Batsman

Domestic team information
- Years: Team
- 1999–2007: Karnataka

Career statistics
Competition	First-class	List A
Matches	68	46
Runs scored	4,181	1,627
Batting average	40.59	39.68
100s/50s	10/19	5/9
Top score	283	109
Balls bowled	234	18
Wickets	1	0
Bowling average	146.0	–
5 wickets in innings	0	–
10 wickets in match	0	–
Best bowling	1/47	–
Catches/stumpings	44/–	15/–
- Source: ESPNcricinfo, 10 September 2021

Barrington Marquis Rowland (born 8 January 1980) is an Indian former cricketer who played for Karnataka. A right-handed batsman, he has represented Karnataka through all age groups and captained the under-16 side. He currently lives in New Zealand as a premier Cricket Player/Coach at Auckland University Cricket club, Auckland Coaching Director at Western District Cricket Association.
