= Jayasoorya Abhiram =

Indian cricketer (born 1959)

Jayasurya Abhiram
Personal information
- Full name: Jayasurya Abhiram
- Born: 30 August 1959 (age 67); Bangalore, Karnataka
- Batting: Right-handed
- Bowling: Right-arm medium-fast

Domestic team information
- Years: Team
- 1979–1989: Karnataka

Career statistics
| Competition | First-class | List A |
|---|---|---|
| Matches | 46 | 6 |
| Runs scored | 1,407 | 32 |
| Batting average | 28.71 | 16 |
| 100s/50s | 1/8 | 0/0 |
| Top score | 102 | 30* |
| Balls bowled | 3,082 | 276 |
| Wickets | 45 | 4 |
| Bowling average | 39 | 52 |
| 5 wickets in innings | 0 | 0 |
| 10 wickets in match | 0 | 0 |
| Best bowling | 4/20 | 2/40 |
| Catches/stumpings | 16/– | 2/– |
- Source: ESPNcricinfo, 3 April 2022

Jayasoorya Abhiram (born 30 August 1959) is an Indian former cricketer. He played as a right-handed batsman who bowled right-arm medium-fast. He made his debut in first-class cricket in the Ranji Trophy on 13 December 1979 for Karnataka against Hyderabad. He played 46 first-class and six list A matches.

Abhiram is married to the granddaughter of Neelam Sanjiva Reddy, the former President of India.
