= J. Arunkumar =

Indian cricketer (born 1975)

Jagadeesh Arunkumar
Personal information
- Full name: Jagadeesh Arunkumar
- Born: 18 January 1975 (age 51); Bangalore, Karnataka, India
- Batting: Right-handed
- Bowling: Right-arm off break
- Role: Batsman

Domestic team information
- Years: Team
- 1993–2008: Karnataka
- 2008: Royal Challengers Bangalore

Head coaching information
- Years: Team
- 2020–2022: United States

Career statistics
Competition	FC	LA	T20
Matches	109	100	7
Runs scored	7,208	3,227	79
Batting average	42.90	33.96	11.28
100s/50s	20/36	7/19	0/0
Top score	178	154*	31
Balls bowled	261	238	0
Wickets	2	7	0
Bowling average	70.50	30.71	–
5 wickets in innings	0	0	0
10 wickets in match	0	–	–
Best bowling	1/5	2/35	–
Catches/stumpings	85/–	21/–	0/–
- Source: ESPNcricinfo, 1 March 2025

Jagadeesh Arunkumar (born 18 January 1975) is an Indian cricket coach and former player. He served as head coach of the United States national cricket team from 2020 to 2022. He played for Karnataka from 1993 to 2008 as a right-handed opening batsman and also played one Indian Premier League (IPL) season for Royal Challengers Bangalore.

== Playing career ==
He played in more than 100 first-class games, scoring 7,208 runs including 20 centuries. He had previously represented India on Under 19 tours of South Africa and England. He also played for the Bangalore Royal Challengers in the 2008 Indian Premier League.

== Coaching career ==
Arunkumar was appointed as batting coach of the Karnataka State Ranji Trophy team on 24 July 2012 where Karnataka had won back-to-back winning the Ranji Trophy, the Irani Cup and the Vijay Hazare Trophy in 2013-14 and 2014–15.

Arunkumar was named Kings XI Punjab's batting coach for the 2017 IPL season. He was appointed head coach of Puducherry cricket team for 2019–20 Ranji Trophy but left midway through the season due to disagreement Cricket Association of Pondicherry officials over his health.

In April 2020, Arunkumar was appointed as the head coach of United States national cricket team replacing interim coach James Pamment after USA Cricket chose not to renew contracts of their support staff. His tenure ended in December 2022 just prior to the end of his three-year contract.
