= Brijesh Patel =

Indian former cricketer (born 1952)

Cricket information
- Batting: Right-handed
- Bowling: Right-arm off break

International information
- National side: India (1974–1979)
- Test debut (cap 131): 6 June 1974 v England
- Last Test: 16 December 1977 v Australia
- ODI debut (cap 7): 13 July 1974 v England
- Last ODI: 16 June 1979 v Sri Lanka

Career statistics
Competition	Test	ODI
Matches	21	10
Runs scored	972	243
Batting average	29.45	30.37
100s/50s	1/5	0/1
Top score	115*	82
Catches/stumpings	17/–	1/–
- Source: ESPNcricinfo, 11 November 2020

Brijesh Patel (born 24 November 1952) is a former Indian cricketer who played for the Indian national cricket team as a right-handed batsman from 1974 until 1979. After retirement, he served as the Indian Premier League chairman between 2019 and 2022.

== Biography ==
Patel played in 21 test matches from 1974 to 1977, and sustained a batting average of 29.45. He was also a bowler, but was never asked to deliver his right-arm off breaks for his national team. His highest test score was 115 not out. He was regarded as an excellent fielder normally covering areas around cover and point. He was never dismissed for a duck in international cricket.

His international career came to a premature end because of his suspect technique against genuine pace. While his international cricketing career was not particularly productive, he made 37 hundreds and over 11000 runs in first class cricket. At the time of his retirement, he held the Ranji Trophy records (since bettered) for most runs and hundreds. His talent first became evident as a student in Bishop Cotton Boys School, Bangalore, and he represented his country in a junior team that traveled to Australia. Throughout his career, he represented Karnataka state and captained the team to many victories. He and fellow international Gundappa Vishwanath formed a formidable batting pair.

After his playing days he became cricket administrator. A Jagmohan Dalmiya (Ex President of BCCI) supporter, Patel was appointed the Director of the National Cricket Academy in India until he was replaced in 2005 by another ex-Test cricketer, Shivlal Yadav, the current director of the NCA.

Brijesh Patel has also been the Hon. Secretary of the Karnataka State Cricket Association (KSCA) since 1999 and controls cricket in Karnataka. Some years ago he was also the Chairman of the National Selection Committee for the Indian national team and resigned after suffering a heart ailment.

Brijesh's son, Udit Patel, is also a cricketer who used to play for Karnataka in domestic matches. Brijesh Patel runs a private cricket coaching academy in Bangalore called B.P.C.A. (Brijesh Patel Cricket Academy), attended by more than 300 boys.

Preceded by Chandu Borde	Chairman, Selection Committee; October 2002 – September 2003	Succeeded by Syed Kirmani
