= Karnataka cricket team =

Indian cricket team

Personnel
- Captain: Devdutt Padikkal
- Coach: Yere Goud
- Owner: Karnataka State Cricket Association

Team information
- Founded: 1879 (147 years ago)
- Home ground: M. Chinnaswamy Stadium, Bengaluru
- Capacity: 35,000

History
- First-class debut: Madras in 1934 at Madras Cricket Club Ground, Madras
- Ranji Trophy wins: 8
- Irani Cup wins: 6
- Vijay Hazare Trophy wins: 5
- Syed Mushtaq Ali Trophy wins: 2
- Official website: KSCA

Karnataka cricket team represents the Indian state of Karnataka in domestic cricket competitions. It has traditionally been one of the strongest teams in the domestic circuit and has produced many of Indian cricket team's iconic players. It was known as Mysore cricket team before the state of Mysore was officially renamed as Karnataka in 1973. It has won the Ranji Trophy eight times and been runners-up six times (including twice as the Mysore team). The team's home ground is the M. Chinnaswamy Stadium in Bengaluru. There was a major push in cricketing infrastructure in 2010s and as of now, grounds in Bengaluru, Mysuru, Hubballi are constantly used in Ranji Trophy, Vijay Hazare Trophy & Karnataka Premier League

== Competition history ==
Karnataka has produced some of the best cricketers from the southern part of India. There was a time during the late 90s when 8 out of 11 players were from Karnataka and from 1996 to 2001 there were about 4–5 players from Karnataka State consistently representing the Indian team.

Karnataka has been the most dominant domestic cricket team of this decade(2010–19), winning 2 Ranji trophies, 2 Irani Cups, 4 Vijay Hazare trophies and 2 Syed Mushtaq Ali Trophy titles. This has been due to the emergence of a number of young players like K. L. Rahul, Manish Pandey, Karun Nair, Shreyas Gopal & Krishnappa Gowtham in presence of established players like Vinay Kumar, Abhimanyu Mithun, Sreenath Aravind, Robin Uthappa & C. M. Gautam

In the 90s, Karnataka was dominant along with Mumbai, winning the Ranji Trophies in the 1995/96, 1998/99 and the 1997/98 seasons, winning the finals against Tamil Nadu, Madhya Pradesh and Uttar Pradesh respectively. This strong run in the Ranji Trophy was due to the emergence of players like Rahul Dravid, Anil Kumble, Javagal Srinath, Sunil Joshi, Venkatesh Prasad, Vijay Bharadwaj & Dodda Ganesh all of whom went on to represent country.

Before that, the team of E.A.S. Prasanna, Bhagwat Chandrasekhar, Gundappa Viswanath, Roger Binny, Brijesh Patel, Raghuram Bhat & Syed Kirmani led Karnataka to 3 Ranji titles (and 3 runners up title) in a span of 10 years between 1973 and 1982.

In the Irani Trophy, Karnataka has won six times and lost twice against the Rest of India team.

The team showed good performance in 2007–08 season. As international players had to move in and out of the squad due to their national duties, the team could not adjust well with the changes in a short period.

A young Karnataka unit performed well in the 2009–10 season and made it to the finals comfortably. The finals took place at the picturesque Gangotri Glades in Mysuru, where Karnataka, backed by a charged full-house crowd, came up with a spirited performance but lost to Mumbai by just 6 runs. Manish Pandey was the highest scorer of the season with 882 runs from 9 matches.

The team emerged winners in the 2013–14 season under the captaincy of Vinay Kumar beating Maharashtra by 7 wickets in the finals played at Hyderabad. They went on to win the Irani Trophy (vs Rest of India) and Vijay Hazare Trophy (domestic ODI tournament) in the same season, thus completing a historic treble.

Karnataka continued their dominance in 2014–15 season too. Firstly, they successfully defended the Vijay Hazare Trophy, winning their final against Punjab by 156 runs. They had a stupendous run in the Ranji Trophy too, and beat Tamil Nadu by an innings and 217 runs in the final at Mumbai to retain the trophy. Karun Nair scored 328, the highest ever individual score in a Ranji Trophy final (bettering Gul Mohammad's 319, scored in the 1946/47 season final). Vinay Kumar became the first captain to pick up a five-wicket haul and score a century in a Ranji final. In the Irani Trophy game that followed, they beat the Rest of India team by 246 runs and retained the trophy. By doing so, they not only repeated the historic treble of the previous season, but also became only the second domestic team (after Bombay) to bag back-to-back Irani Cups.

Karnataka had a modest 2015–16 Ranji season, chalking up 2 wins, 1 loss and 5 draws in the league stage. They did not qualify for the knock-outs. Karnataka's only loss came against Maharashtra in their final league game, which ended an unbeaten streak of 37 first-class matches (20 wins, 17 draws) that stretched back to November 2012. Karnataka did not qualify for the knock-outs in the Vijay Hazare Trophy too, despite winning 4 of their 6 league games.

In the 2016–17 Ranji season, Karnataka had a good run until the quarter-finals, where they were beaten by Tamil Nadu in a low scoring game.

Karnataka had a dominant run in the 2017–18 Ranji season, notching up 4 wins and 2 draws and topping Group A. They faced Mumbai in the quarter-finals and inflicted an innings defeat on them. However, they suffered a heart-breaking 5-run loss to Vidarbha in the semifinals and bowed out of the competition. Mayank Agarwal (1160 runs) and Krishnappa Gowtham (34 wickets) were the stand-out performers of the season.

In the 2018–19 domestic season, Karnataka won their maiden T20 title. They beat Maharashtra by 8 wickets in the final of the Syed Mushtaq Ali Trophy. They went on to defend their title in the 2019–20 season when they beat Tamil Nadu by 1 run in the finals.

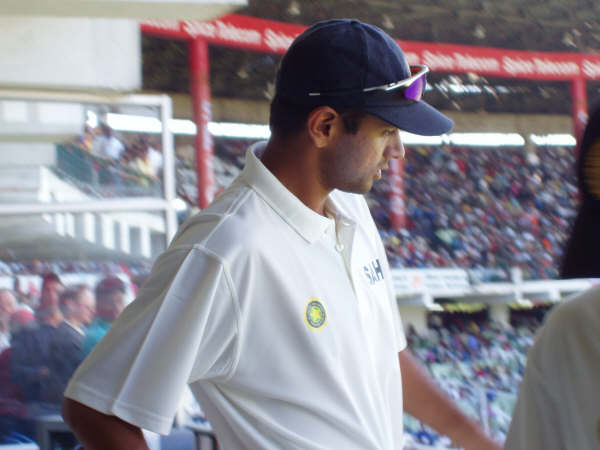
Rahul Dravid scored hundreds in the finals of both 1995–96 and 1997–98 Ranji Trophy.

== Honours ==
- Ranji Trophy
  - Winners (8): 1973–74, 1977–78, 1982–83, 1995–96, 1997–98, 1998–99, 2013–14, 2014–15
  - Runners-up (7): 1941–42, 1959–60, 1974–75, 1978–79, 1981–82, 2009–10, 2025–26
- Irani Cup
  - Winners: 1974–75, 1983–84, 1996–97, 1998–99, 2013–14, 2014–15
- Wills Trophy
  - Runners-up (3): 1983–84, 1987–88, 1999–2000
- Vijay Hazare Trophy
  - Winners (5): 2013–14, 2014–15, 2017–18, 2019–20, 2024–25
  - Runners-up (2): 2019–20, 2021–22
- Deodhar Trophy
  - Runners-up: 2017–18
- Syed Mushtaq Ali Trophy
  - Winners (2): 2018–19, 2019–20
  - Runners-up: 2021–22

== Famous players ==
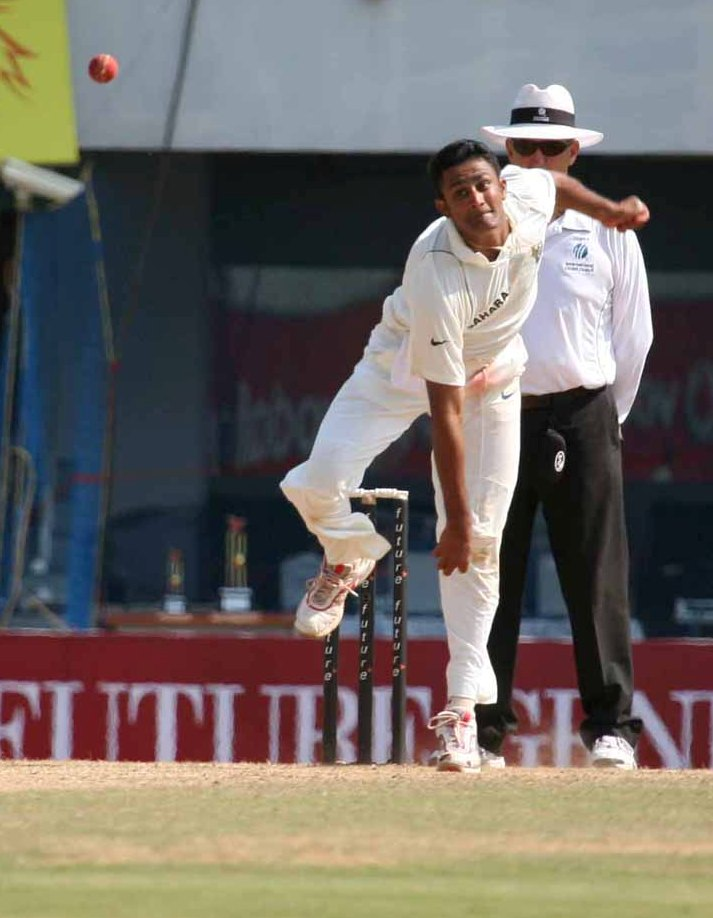
Anil Kumble is one of the four bowlers to have taken more than 600 Test wickets.

Players from Karnataka who have played Test cricket for India, along with year of Test debut:

- Erapalli Prasanna (1962)^{†}
- Bhagwat Chandrasekhar (1964)^{†}
- Venkataraman Subramanya (1965)^{†}
- Gundappa Viswanath (1969)^{†}
- Brijesh Patel (1974)^{†}
- Syed Kirmani (1976)^{†}
- Roger Binny (1979)^{†}
- Raghuram Bhat (1983)^{†}
- Sadanand Viswanath (1985)^{†}
- Anil Kumble (1990)^{†}
- Javagal Srinath (1991)^{†}
- Sunil Joshi (1996)^{†}
- Venkatesh Prasad (1996)^{†}
- Rahul Dravid (1996)^{†}
- David Johnson (1996)^{†}
- Dodda Ganesh (1997)^{†}
- Vijay Bharadwaj (1999)^{†}
- Abhimanyu Mithun (2010)^{†}
- Vinay Kumar (2012)^{†}
- Stuart Binny (2014)^{†}
- KL Rahul (2014)^{†}
- Karun Nair (2016)^{†}
- Mayank Agarwal (2018)^{†}
- Prasidh Krishna (2023)^{†}
- Devdutt Padikkal (2024)

Players from Karnataka who have played ODI but not Test cricket for India, along with year of ODI debut :

- Sudhakar Rao (1976)^{†}
- Sujith Somasunder (1996)^{†}
- Robin Uthappa (2006)^{†}
- Manish Pandey (2015)^{†}
- Krishnappa Gowtham (2021)

Players from Karnataka who have played T20I but not ODI or Test cricket for India, along with year of T20I debut :

- Sreenath Aravind (2015)^{†}

Cricketers who played a small portion of their first-class career for Karnataka, and played Test cricket for India, along with year of Test debut :

- Phiroze Palia (1932)
- Venkatappa Muddiah (1959)^{†}
- Budhi Kunderan (1960)^{†}

Other notable Cricketers who played a considerable portion of their first-class career for Karnataka :

- Barrington Rowland (1999–2007)

^{†} indicates inductees of KSCA Hall of Fame

== Current squad ==
Players with international caps are listed in bold.

Name	Birth date	Batting style	Bowling style	Notes
Batsmen
**Mayank Agarwal**	16 February 1991 (age 35)	Right-handed	Right-arm off break	
**Karun Nair**	6 December 1991 (age 34)	Right-handed	Right-arm off break	
R Smaran	5 May 2003 (age 23)	Left-handed	Right-arm off break	**Vice-captain**; Plays for **Sunrisers Hyderabad** in IPL
**Devdutt Padikkal**	7 July 2000 (age 26)	Left-handed	Right-arm off break	**Captain**; Plays for **Royal Challengers Bengaluru** in IPL
Abhinav Manohar	16 September 1994 (age 32)	Right-handed	Right-arm leg break	
KV Aneesh	13 July 2001 (age 25)	Right-handed		
Rohan Patil	18 August 2001 (age 25)	Left-handed		
Aneeshwar Gautam	16 January 2003 (age 23)	Left-handed	Slow left-arm orthodox	
**Manish Pandey**	10 September 1989 (age 37)	Right-handed	Right-arm medium	Plays for **Kolkata Knight Riders** in IPL
All-rounder
Praveen Dubey	1 July 1993 (age 33)	Right-handed	Right-arm leg break	
Wicket-keepers
KL Shrijith	12 August 1996 (age 30)	Left-handed		
**KL Rahul**	18 April 1992 (age 34)	Right-handed		Plays for **Delhi Capitals** in IPL
Luvnith Sisodia	15 January 2000 (age 26)	Left-handed		
Spin Bowlers
Shreyas Gopal	4 September 1993 (age 33)	Right-handed	Right-arm leg break	Plays for **Chennai Super Kings** in IPL
Shikhar Shetty	27 August 2005 (age 21)	Right-handed	Slow left-arm orthodox	
Shreesha Achar	23 January 1996 (age 30)	Left-handed	Slow left-arm orthodox	
Madhav Bajaj	6 May 2000 (age 26)	Left-handed	Slow left-arm orthodox	
Rithesh Bhatkal	16 May 1993 (age 33)	Right-handed	Right-arm off break	
Pace Bowlers
Vidyadhar Patil	5 September 2000 (age 26)	Right-handed	Right-arm medium	
Vidwath Kaverappa	25 February 1999 (age 27)	Right-handed	Right-arm medium-fast	
Vijaykumar Vyshak	31 January 1997 (age 29)	Right-handed	Right-arm medium	Plays for **Punjab Kings** in IPL
Abhilash Shetty	6 June 1998 (age 28)	Left-handed	Left-arm medium	
**Prasidh Krishna**	19 February 1996 (age 30)	Right-handed	Right-arm fast-medium	Plays for **Gujarat Titans** in IPL
Manvanth Kumar	11 January 2004 (age 22)	Left-handed	Right-arm medium	

Updated as on 17 November 2026

== See also ==
- Karnataka football team
