= 2007–08 Vijay Hazare Trophy =

Indian cricket tournament

- Dates: 26 February – 10 April 2008
- Administrator(s): BCCI
- Cricket format: List A cricket
- Tournament format(s): Round-robin and Playoff format
- Host(s): Various
- Champions: Saurashtra (1st title)
- Runners-up: Bengal
- Participants: 27
- Matches: 69
- Most runs: Ajinkya Rahane (394) (Mumbai)
- Most wickets: Vishal Bhatia (17) (Himachal Pradesh)

The 2007–08 Vijay Hazare Trophy was the 15th edition of India's annual List A cricket tournament and the first after it was renamed in honour of Vijay Hazare, who had died in December 2004. It was previously known as the Ranji One Day Trophy. It was contested between 27 domestic cricket teams of India, starting in February and finishing in April 2008. In the final, Saurashtra beat Bengal by 6 wickets to win their maiden title.

== Group stage ==
=== Central Zone ===
Teams	Matches	Won	Lost	Tie/NR	Points	NRR
Vidarbha	4	4	0	0	17	+0.614
Madhya Pradesh	4	3	1	0	13	+0.951
Rajasthan	4	2	2	0	8	-0.502
Uttar Pradesh	4	1	3	0	5	-0.020
Railways	4	0	4	0	-3	-1.000

=== East Zone ===
Teams	Matches	Won	Lost	Tie/NR	Points	NRR
Bengal	4	3	0	1	17	+1.915
Jharkhand	4	2	1	1	11	+0.614
Odisha	4	2	2	0	6	-0.827
Tripura	4	1	2	1	6	-0.510
Assam	4	0	3	1	1	-0.708

=== North Zone ===
Teams	Matches	Won	Lost	Tie/NR	Points	NRR
Delhi	5	4	1	0	19	+1.455
Himachal Pradesh	5	4	1	0	16	+0.372
Punjab	5	3	2	0	14	+0.863
Haryana	5	3	2	0	12	-0.016
Services	5	1	4	0	3	-0.644
Jammu and Kashmir	5	0	5	0	-4	-1.775

=== South Zone ===
Teams	Matches	Won	Lost	Tie/NR	Points	NRR
Karnataka	5	5	0	0	22	+1.184
Tamil Nadu	5	4	1	0	18	+1.009
Hyderabad	5	2	3	0	9	+0.133
Goa	5	2	3	0	7	-0.167
Andhra	5	1	4	0	3	-0.645
Kerala	5	1	4	0	1	-1.500

=== West Zone ===
Teams	Matches	Won	Lost	Tie/NR	Points	NRR
Mumbai	4	3	1	0	14	+1.680
Saurashtra	4	2	2	0	9	-0.244
Baroda	4	2	2	0	8	+0.441
Maharashtra	4	2	2	0	7	-1.004
Gujarat	4	1	3	0	2	-0.963

== Knockout Stage ==
=== Pre Quarter-finals ===
1 April 2008
Scorecard

Himachal Pradesh; 259/8 (50 overs)	v	Jharkhand; 229 (49.2 overs)
Paras Dogra 97* (104); Santosh Lal 2/37 (7 overs)		Ishank Jaggi 55 (67); Vishal Bhatia 4/46 (8.2 overs)

Himachal Pradesh won by 30 runs
Port Trust Diamond Jubilee Stadium, Vishakhapatnam
Umpires: K. Krishnan and Sundaram Ravi

- Himachal Pradesh won the toss and elected to bat.
- Himachal Pradesh advanced to the quarterfinals.

1 April 2008
Scorecard

Madhya Pradesh; 189 (48.2 overs)	v	Tamil Nadu; 194/4 (41.5 overs)
Shadab Khan 39 (57); Subramaniam Badrinath 2/16 (4 overs)		Subramaniam Badrinath 79* (97); Jalaj Saxena 2/49 (9.5 overs)

Tamil Nadu won by 6 wickets
Dr. Y. S. Rajasekhara Reddy International Cricket Stadium, Vishakhapatnam
Umpires: A Banerjee and Abhik Mitra

- Madhya Pradesh won the toss and elected to bat.
- Selvam Suresh Kumar (Tamil Nadu) made his List-A debut.
- Tamil Nadu advanced to the quarterfinals.

=== Quarter-finals ===
2 April 2008
Scorecard

Bengal; 295/5 (47 overs)	v	Delhi; 247 (43.4 overs)
Laxmi Shukla 124 (95); Narender Singh 3/55 (10 overs)		Virat Kohli 56 (56); Shib Paul 3/42 (6.4 overs)

Bengal won by 48 runs
Port Trust Diamond Jubilee Stadium, Vishakhapatnam
Umpires: K. Krishnan and Sundaram Ravi

- Delhi won the toss and elected to field.
- Shreevats Goswami (Bengal) and Narender Singh (Delhi) both made their List-A debuts.
- The match was reduced to 47 overs per side due to rain.
- Bengal advanced to the semifinals.

2 April 2008
Scorecard

Karnataka; 234/9 (50 overs)	v	Saurashtra; 235/3 (46.2 overs)
Robin Uthappa 50 (69); Balkrishna Jadeja 3/68 (10 overs)		Jaydev Shah 100 (80); Neravanda Aiyappa 1/29 (8 overs)

Saurashtra won by 7 wickets
Dr. Y. S. Rajasekhara Reddy International Cricket Stadium, Vishakhapatnam
Umpires: A Banerjee and Abhik Mitra

- Saurashtra won the toss and elected to field.
- Manish Pandey (Karnataka) made his List-A debut.
- Saurashtra advanced to the semifinals.

4 April 2008
Scorecard

Mumbai; 285/9 (50 overs)	v	Tamil Nadu; 226/8 (50 overs)
Rohit Sharma 100 (89); Ravichandran Ashwin 2/55 (10 overs)		MK Sivakumar 56* (80); Usman Malvi 3/25 (10 overs)

Mumbai won by 59 runs
Dr. Y. S. Rajasekhara Reddy International Cricket Stadium, Vishakhapatnam
Umpires: S. Ravindhron and Ravi Subramanian

- Mumbai won the toss and elected to bat.
- Sahil Kukreja (Mumbai) made his List-A debut.
- Mumbai advanced to the semifinals.

5 April 2008
Scorecard

Vidarbha; 204 (49.4 overs)	v	Himachal Pradesh; 175 (45.4 overs)
Faiz Fazal 64 (121); Ashok Thakur 4/38 (10 overs)		Sangram Singh 38 (70); Ravi Jangid 3/36 (5 overs)

Vidarbha won by 29 runs
Dr. Y. S. Rajasekhara Reddy International Cricket Stadium, Vishakhapatnam
Umpires: S. Ravindhron and Ravi Subramanian

- Himachal Pradesh won the toss and elected to field.
- Vidarbha advanced to the semifinals.

=== Semi-finals ===
7 April 2008
Scorecard

Mumbai; 249/9 (50 overs)	v	Bengal; 250/6 (45.4 overs)
Amol Muzumdar 71 (85); Iresh Saxena 4/50 (10 overs)		Laxmi Shukla 65 (59); Dhawal Kulkarni 3/45 (9 overs)

Bengal won by 4 wickets
Dr. Y. S. Rajasekhara Reddy International Cricket Stadium, Vishakhapatnam
Umpires: S Ramakrishna and MSS Ranawat

- Mumbai won the toss and elected to bat.
- Bengal advanced to the final.

8 April 2008
Scorecard

Vidarbha; 212/9 (50 overs)	v	Saurashtra; 216/5 (47.3 overs)
Amit Paunikar 63 (108); Ravindra Jadeja 3/49 (10 overs)		Chirag Pathak 58 (64); Viraj Kadbe 2/36 (8 overs)

Saurashtra won by 5 wickets
Dr. Y. S. Rajasekhara Reddy International Cricket Stadium, Vishakhapatnam
Umpires: S Ramakrishna and MSS Ranawat

- Vidarbha won the toss and elected to bat.
- Saurashtra advanced to the final.

=== Final ===
10 April 2008
Scorecard

Bengal; 86 (39.2 overs)	v	Saurashtra; 89/4 (23 overs)
Wriddhiman Saha 25* (60); Jayesh Odedra 4/16 (10 overs)		Chirag Pathak 25 (38); Shib Paul 3/22 (7 overs)

Saurashtra won by 6 wickets
Dr. Y. S. Rajasekhara Reddy International Cricket Stadium, Vishakhapatnam
Umpires: S Ramakrishna and MSS Ranawat

- Bengal won the toss and elected to bat.
- Saurashtra won the 2007-08 Vijay Hazare Trophy.
