= List of 2008 Indian Premier League auctions and personnel signings =

This is a list of all auctions and personnel signings for the 2008 Indian Premier League (IPL).

== Team Auction ==
The auctions for team ownership were held on 24 January 2008. The base price of each team was set at US$50 million. The auction fetched a total amount of US$723.59 million against the combined base price of US$400 million. Mumbai was the most expensive team, costing over US$111.9 million. The auction also led to controversy regarding the conflict of interest with then BCCI secretary N. Srinivasan holding a stake in the Chennai team.

Team	City	Franchise Owner(s)	Cost (in US$ millions)
Royal Challengers Bangalore	Bangalore	Vijay Mallya's United Spirits	111.60
Chennai Super Kings	Chennai	India Cements	91.00
Delhi Daredevils	Delhi	GMR Group	84.00
Deccan Chargers	Hyderabad	Deccan Chronicle	107.00
Rajasthan Royals	Jaipur	Emerging Media-led consortium	67.00
Kolkata Knight Riders	Kolkata	Shah Rukh Khan's Red Chillies Entertainment	75.09
Kings XI Punjab	Mohali	Preity Zinta, Ness Wadia, Karan Paul and Dabur's Mohit Burman	76.00
Mumbai Indians	Mumbai	Mukesh Ambani's Reliance Industries	111.90

== Player's Auction ==
=== Icon players ===
Icon player was a status given to five players of the Indian Premier League to ensure that top drawer players will represent their respective home city sides, which was important for the league to increase fan support and interest among the locals. The icon players received 15% percent more money than the highest paid player of the team bought in the auction. Initially four icon players were designated but later on the request of Delhi Daredevils, Virender Sehwag's name was added to the list. Deccan Chargers also asked for Icon Player status to be given to VVS Laxman, but he declined the offer in order to allow the franchise to spend more money on other players and still not breach the US$5 million salary cap.

Name	Team	Highest bid by the team (in US$ thousands)	Salary (in US$ thousands)
Sachin Tendulkar	Mumbai Indians	975	1121
Sourav Ganguly	Kolkata Knight Riders	950	1093
Rahul Dravid	Royal Challengers Bangalore	900	1035
Yuvraj Singh	Kings XI Punjab	925	1064
Virender Sehwag	Delhi Daredevils	725	834

=== Auction-1 ===
The first auction was held on 20 February 2008. The total salary cap was set at US$5 million with a minimum of US$ 3.3 million to be spend. Players were divided into categories with Category-A, B, C and D representing prominent players. Remaining wicket-keepers, all-rounders, batsmen and bowlers were kept in category-E, F, G and H, respectively. 77 players signed up for auction including 48 foreign players. 75 players were auctioned with Mohammed Yousuf and Ashwell Prince remaining unsold. MS Dhoni was the costliest player at US$1.5 million. Andrew Symonds was the most costly foreign player. The unsold players were paid their base price by the BCCI. Jaipur was fined for not reaching the minimum spending of US$3 million.

No.	Category	Name	Nationality	Speciality	Base Price (in US$ thousands)	Team	Auctioned Price (in US$ thousands)
1	A	Shane Warne	Australia	Bowler	450	Rajasthan Royals	450
2	A	MS Dhoni	India	Wicketkeeper	400	Chennai Super Kings	1500
3	A	Adam Gilchrist	Australia	Wicket keeper	300	Deccan Chargers	700
4	A	Shoaib Akhtar	Pakistan	Bowler	250	Kolkata Knight Riders	425
5	A	Mahela Jayawardene	Sri Lanka	Batsman	250	Kings XI Punjab	475
6	A	Muttiah Muralitharan	Sri Lanka	Bowler	250	Chennai Super Kings	600
7	B	Anil Kumble	India	Bowler	250	Royal Challengers Bangalore	500
8	B	Glenn McGrath^{[REC]}	Australia	Bowler	350	Delhi Daredevils	350
9	B	Mohammed Yousuf^{[REC]}	Pakistan	Batsman	350	Unsold	
10	B	Harbhajan Singh	India	Bowler	250	Mumbai Indians	850
11	B	Sanath Jayasuriya	Sri Lanka	Allrounder	250	Mumbai Indians	975
12	B	Kumar Sangakkara	Sri Lanka	Wicketkeeper-batsman	250	Kings XI Punjab	700
13	C	Ricky Ponting	Australia	Batsman	335	Kolkata Knight Riders	400
14	C	Brett Lee	Australia	Bowler	300	Kings XI Punjab	900
15	C	Andrew Symonds	Australia	Allrounder	250	Deccan Chargers	1350
16	C	Michael Hussey^{[REC]}	Australia	Batsman	250	Chennai Super Kings	250
17	C	Daniel Vettori	New Zealand	Bowler	250	Delhi Daredevils	625
18	C	Matthew Hayden	Australia	Batsman	225	Chennai Super Kings	375
19	C	Brendon McCullum	New Zealand	Wicketkeeper	175	Kolkata Knight Riders	700
20	C	Jacob Oram	New Zealand	Allrounder	200	Chennai Super Kings	675
21	D	Stephen Fleming	New Zealand	Batsman	350	Chennai Super Kings	350
22	D	Graeme Smith	South Africa	Batsman	250	Rajasthan Royals	250
23	D	Herschelle Gibbs	South Africa	Batsman	250	Deccan Chargers	575
24	D	Chris Gayle	(Jamaica) West Indies	Allrounder	250	Kolkata Knight Riders	800
25	D	Shoaib Malik	Pakistan	Allrounder	300	Delhi Daredevils	500
26	D	Shahid Afridi	Pakistan	Allrounder	225	Deccan Chargers	675
27	D	Younis Khan	Pakistan	Batsman	225	Rajasthan Royals	225
28	D	Mohammad Asif	Pakistan	Bowler	225	Delhi Daredevils	650
29	D	Jacques Kallis	South Africa	Allrounder	225	Royal Challengers Bangalore	900
30	D	Zaheer Khan	India	Bowler	200	Royal Challengers Bangalore	450
31	D	Sreesanth	India	Bowler	200	Kings XI Punjab	625
32	E	Dinesh Karthik	India	Wicketkeeper	200	Delhi Daredevils	525
33	E	AB de Villiers	South Africa	Wicketkeeper	200	Delhi Daredevils	300
34	E	Mark Boucher	South Africa	Wicketkeeper	200	Royal Challengers Bangalore	450
35	E	Parthiv Patel	India	Wicketkeeper	150	Chennai Super Kings	325
36	E	Kamran Akmal	Pakistan	Wicketkeeper	150	Rajasthan Royals	150
37	E	Tatenda Taibu^{[REC]}	Zimbabwe	Wicketkeeper	125	Kolkata Knight Riders	125
38	F	Albie Morkel	South Africa	Allrounder	225	Chennai Super Kings	675
39	F	Ajit Agarkar	India	Allrounder	200	Kolkata Knight Riders	350
40	F	Shaun Pollock	South Africa	Allrounder	200	Mumbai Indians	550
41	F	Irfan Pathan	India	Allrounder	200	Kings XI Punjab	925
42	F	Scott Styris	New Zealand	Allrounder	175	Deccan Chargers	175
43	F	Farveez Maharoof	Sri Lanka	Allrounder	150	Delhi Daredevils	225
44	F	Tillakaratne Dilshan	Sri Lanka	Allrounder	152	Delhi Daredevils	250
45	F	Cameron White	Australia	Allrounder	100	Royal Challengers Bangalore	500
46	F	Yusuf Pathan	India	Allrounder	100	Rajasthan Royals	475
47	F	Joginder Sharma	India	Allrounder	100	Chennai Super Kings	225
48	G	Ramnaresh Sarwan^{[REC]}	(Guyana) West Indies	Batsman	225	Kings XI Punjab	225
49	G	Simon Katich^{[REC]}	Australia	Batsman	200	Kings XI Punjab	200
50	G	Justin Langer^{[REC]}	Australia	Batsman	200	Rajasthan Royals	200
51	G	Gautam Gambhir	India	Batsman	220	Delhi Daredevils	725
52	G	Robin Uthappa	India	Batsman	200	Mumbai Indians	800
53	G	Shivnarine Chanderpaul^{[REC]}	(Guyana) West Indies	Batsman	200	Royal Challengers Bangalore	200
54	G	Ashwell Prince^{[REC]}	South Africa	Batsman	175	Unsold	
55	G	VVS Laxman	India	Batsman	150	Deccan Chargers	375
56	G	Wasim Jaffer	India	Batsman	150	Royal Challengers Bangalore	150
57	G	Rohit Sharma	India	Batsman	150	Deccan Chargers	750
58	G	Loots Bosman^{[REC]}	South Africa	Batsman	150	Mumbai Indians	175
59	G	Mohammad Kaif	India	Batsman	125	Rajasthan Royals	675
60	G	Suresh Raina	India	Batsman	125	Chennai Super Kings	650
61	G	Manoj Tiwary	India	Batsman	100	Delhi Daredevils	675
62	G	Chamara Silva	Sri Lanka	Batsman	100	Deccan Chargers	100
63	G	David Hussey	Australia	Batsman	100	Kolkata Knight Riders	625
64	H	Nathan Bracken	Australia	Bowler	225	Royal Challengers Bangalore	325
65	H	R P Singh	India	Bowler	200	Deccan Chargers	875
66	H	Murali Kartik	India	Bowler	200	Kolkata Knight Riders	425
67	H	Makhaya Ntini	South Africa	Bowler	200	Chennai Super Kings	200
68	H	Lasith Malinga	Sri Lanka	Bowler	200	Mumbai Indians	350
69	H	Chaminda Vaas	Sri Lanka	Bowler	200	Deccan Chargers	200
70	H	Ramesh Powar	India	Bowler	150	Kings XI Punjab	170
71	H	Umar Gul	Pakistan	Bowler	150	Kolkata Knight Riders	150
72	H	Dale Steyn	South Africa	Bowler	150	Royal Challengers Bangalore	325
73	H	Dilhara Fernando	Sri Lanka	Bowler	150	Mumbai Indians	150
74	H	Ishant Sharma	India	Bowler	150	Kolkata Knight Riders	950
75	H	Piyush Chawla	India	Bowler	125	Kings XI Punjab	400
76	H	Munaf Patel	India	Bowler	100	Rajasthan Royals	275
77	H	Nuwan Zoysa	Sri Lanka	Bowler	100	Deccan Chargers	110

^{REC} REC: Players unsold originally but were brought back.

=== Auction-2 ===
The second IPL auction for foreign players took place in Mumbai on 11 March 2008. 26 players including unsold players from auction-1 signed up for the auction. The base price was set at US$50,000. 14 players were sold in the auction. James Hopes was the costliest player at US$300,000. Dimitri Mascarenhas became the first English player to sign up for IPL. Mohammed Yousuf again remained unsold in 2nd auction due to continuing dispute with Indian Cricket League. IPL allowed teams to cross 8 foreign players limit. Players sold lower than their signed up price were paid the remaining amount by IPL.

No.	Name	Nationality	Speciality	Team	Auctioned Price (in US$ thousands)
1	Mohammed Yousuf	Pakistan	Batsman	Unsold	
2	Morne Morkel	South Africa	Bowler	Rajasthan Royals	60
3	Ashwell Prince	South Africa	Batsman	Mumbai Indians	175
4	Kyle Mills	New Zealand	Bowler	Kings XI Punjab	150
5	Mohammad Hafeez	Pakistan	All-rounder	Kolkata Knight Riders	100
6	Ross Taylor	New Zealand	Batsman	Royal Challengers Bangalore	100
7	Peter Fulton	New Zealand	Batsman	Unsold	
8	Jamie How	New Zealand	Batsman	Unsold	
9	Jeetan Patel	New Zealand	Allrounder	Unsold	
10	Chris Martin	New Zealand	Bowler	Unsold	
11	James Franklin	New Zealand	Allrounder	Unsold	
12	Brad Hodge	Australia	Allrounder	Unsold	
13	Shane Watson	Australia	Allrounder	Rajasthan Royals	125
14	Phil Jaques	Australia	Batsman	Unsold	
15	James Hopes	Australia	Allrounder	Kings XI Punjab	300
16	Brett Geeves	Australia	Bowler	Delhi Daredevils	50
17	Luke Pomersbach	Australia	Batsman	Kings XI Punjab	50
18	Prasanna Jayawardene	Sri Lanka	Wicketkeeper	Unsold	
19	Mohammad Ashraful	Bangladesh	Batsman	Unsold	
20	Mashrafe Mortaza	Bangladesh	Allrounder	Unsold	
21	Misbah-ul-Haq	Pakistan	Batsman	Royal Challengers Bangalore	125
22	Salman Butt	Pakistan	Batsman	Kolkata Knight Riders	100
23	Yasir Hameed	Pakistan	Batsman	Unsold	
24	Dimitri Mascarenhas	England	Allrounder	Rajasthan Royals	100
25	Sohail Tanvir	Pakistan	Bowler	Rajasthan Royals	100
26	Abdur Razzak	Bangladesh	Bowler	Royal Challengers Bangalore	50

=== Under-19 Draft ===
Along with 2nd Auction, the 15 players from winners of 2008 Under-19 Cricket World Cup along with Viraj Kadbe were picked upon draft system based upon US National Football League. The franchises were randomly allotted numbers from 1 to 8. The franchise assigned the number 1 got the choice of picking player first and then the second franchise and so on. After eight players were picked, the order of the bidding reversed. Delhi was the first team and chose Pradeep Sangwan. Deccan Chargers passed on both of their drafts. Delhi Daredevils also picked only one of the draft while Chennai Super Kings picked three players. The players with Ranji experience were paid US$ 50,000 and remaining US$ 30,000.

Name	Team	Salary (in US$ thousands)
Pradeep Sangwan	Delhi Daredevils	50
Virat Kohli	Royal Challengers Bangalore	50
Saurabh Tiwary	Mumbai Indians	50
Taruwar Kohli	Rajasthan Royals	30
Siddarth Kaul	Kolkata Knight Riders	50
Tanmay Srivastava	Kings XI Punjab	50
Abhinav Mukund	Chennai Super Kings	50
Napoleon Einstein	Chennai Super Kings	30
Ajitesh Argal	Kings XI Punjab	50
Iqbal Abdulla	Kolkata Knight Riders	30
R Jadeja	Rajasthan Royals	50
Manish Pandey	Mumbai Indians	30
Shreevats Goswami	Royal Challengers Bangalore	30
Perry Goyal	Unsold	
Siva Kumar	Unsold	
Viraj Kadbe	Chennai Super Kings	30

== Player's Signing ==
IPL franchise could sign Indian players at any time. The base price for was fixed at $50,000 for the Ranji Trophy players and $20,000 for those having not played the Ranji Trophy. Franchises had to pick minimum four under-22 Indian players from their designated catchment area in their squad. Praveen Kumar was claimed to be signed by both Delhi and Bangalore franchise, with the player later confirming that he had joined the Royal Challengers Bangalore. The following players were signed before the tournament.

Name	Nationality	Team	Signing date	Ref
Praveen Kumar	India	Royal Challengers Bangalore	23 February 2008	
Yo Mahesh	India	Delhi Daredevils	Up to 10 March 2008	
Shikhar Dhawan	India	Delhi Daredevils	Up to 10 March 2008	
Mithun Manhas	India	Delhi Daredevils	Up to 10 March 2008	
Rajat Bhatia	India	Delhi Daredevils	Up to 10 March 2008	
Mayank Tehlan	India	Delhi Daredevils	Up to 10 March 2008	
Sunil Joshi	India	Royal Challengers Bangalore	Up to 10 March 2008	
Balachandra Akhil	India	Royal Challengers Bangalore	Up to 10 March 2008	
Vinay Kumar	India	Royal Challengers Bangalore	Up to 10 March 2008	
Bharat Chipli	India	Royal Challengers Bangalore	Up to 10 March 2008	
J. Arunkumar	India	Royal Challengers Bangalore	Up to 10 March 2008	
KP Appanna	India	Royal Challengers Bangalore	Up to 10 March 2008	
Devraj Patil	India	Royal Challengers Bangalore	Up to 10 March 2008	
Shadab Jakati	India	Chennai Super Kings	Up to 10 March 2008	
Sudeep Tyagi	India	Chennai Super Kings	Up to 10 March 2008	
R Ashwin	India	Chennai Super Kings	Up to 10 March 2008	
Srikkanth Anirudha	India	Chennai Super Kings	Up to 10 March 2008	
S Badrinath	India	Chennai Super Kings	Up to 10 March 2008	
Pinal Shah	India	Mumbai Indians	Up to 10 March 2008	
Abhishek Nayar	India	Mumbai Indians	Up to 10 March 2008	
Ajinkya Rahane	India	Mumbai Indians	Up to 10 March 2008	
Yogesh Takawale	India	Mumbai Indians	Up to 10 March 2008	
Sanjay Bangar	India	Deccan Chargers	Up to 10 March 2008	
Venugopal Rao	India	Deccan Chargers	Up to 10 March 2008	
Arjun Yadav	India	Deccan Chargers	Up to 10 March 2008	
Dwaraka Ravi Teja	India	Deccan Chargers	Up to 10 March 2008	
Pragyan Ojha	India	Deccan Chargers	Up to 10 March 2008	
Doddapaneni Kalyankrishna	India	Deccan Chargers	Up to 10 March 2008	
P Vijay Kumar	India	Deccan Chargers	Up to 10 March 2008	
Sarvesh Kumar^{[N-RAN]}	India	Deccan Chargers	Up to 10 March 2008	
Halhadar Das	India	Deccan Chargers	Up to 10 March 2008	
VRV Singh	India	Kings XI Punjab	Up to 10 March 2008	
Karan Goel	India	Kings XI Punjab	Up to 10 March 2008	
Uday Kaul	India	Kings XI Punjab	Up to 10 March 2008	
Pankaj Singh	India	Rajasthan Royals	Up to 10 March 2008	
Anup Revandkar^{[N-RAN]}	India	Rajasthan Royals	Up to 10 March 2008	
Dinesh Salunkhe^{[N-RAN]}	India	Rajasthan Royals	Up to 10 March 2008	
Wriddhiman Saha	India	Kolkata Knight Riders	11 March 2008	
Laxmi Ratan Shukla	India	Kolkata Knight Riders	11 March 2008	
Rohan Banerjee^{[N-RAN]}	India	Kolkata Knight Riders	11 March 2008	
Saurasish Lahiri	India	Kolkata Knight Riders	11 March 2008	
Aakash Chopra	India	Kolkata Knight Riders	13 March 2008	
Cheteshwar Pujara	India	Kolkata Knight Riders	13 March 2008	
Ashish Nehra	India	Mumbai Indians	14 March 2008	
Amit Mishra	India	Delhi Daredevils	14 March 2008	
Luke Ronchi	New Zealand	Mumbai Indians	26 March 2008	
Lakshmipathy Balaji	India	Chennai Super Kings	29 March 2008	
Shaun Marsh	Australia	Kings XI Punjab	9 April 2008	
Dominic Thornely	Australia	Mumbai Indians	9 April 2008	
Darren Lehmann	Australia	Rajasthan Royals	15 April 2008	
Neravanda Aiyappa	India	Royal Challengers Bangalore	Up to 15 April 2008	
Palani Amarnath	India	Chennai Super Kings	Up to 15 April 2008	
Arun Karthik^{[N-RAN]}	India	Chennai Super Kings	Up to 15 April 2008	
Manpreet Gony	India	Chennai Super Kings	Up to 15 April 2008	
Suresh Kumar	India	Chennai Super Kings	Up to 15 April 2008	
Vidyut Sivaramakrishnan	India	Chennai Super Kings	Up to 15 April 2008	
Yogesh Nagar^{[N-RAN]}	India	Delhi Daredevils	Up to 15 April 2008	
Tejashwi Yadav^{[N-RAN]}	India	Delhi Daredevils	Up to 15 April 2008	
Pankaj Dharmani	India	Kings XI Punjab	Up to 15 April 2008	
Rishi Dhawan^{[N-RAN]}	India	Kings XI Punjab	Up to 15 April 2008	
Gagandeep Singh	India	Kings XI Punjab	Up to 15 April 2008	
Sahil Kukreja	India	Kings XI Punjab	Up to 15 April 2008	
Wilkin Mota	India	Kings XI Punjab	Up to 15 April 2008	
Nitin Saini	India	Kings XI Punjab	Up to 15 April 2008	
Sunny Sohal	India	Kings XI Punjab	Up to 15 April 2008	
Ashoke Dinda	India	Kolkata Knight Riders	Up to 15 April 2008	
Debabrata Das^{[N-RAN]}	India	Kolkata Knight Riders	Up to 15 April 2008	
Ranadeb Bose	India	Kolkata Knight Riders	Up to 15 April 2008	
Yashpal Singh	India	Kolkata Knight Riders	Up to 15 April 2008	
Ankeet Chavan^{[N-RAN]}	India	Mumbai Indians	Up to 15 April 2008	
Gaurav Dhiman	India	Mumbai Indians	Up to 15 April 2008	
Siddharth Chitnis^{[N-RAN]}	India	Mumbai Indians	Up to 15 April 2008	
Rajesh Pawar	India	Mumbai Indians	Up to 15 April 2008	
Rohan Raje^{[N-RAN]}	India	Mumbai Indians	Up to 15 April 2008	
Vikrant Yeligati^{[N-RAN]}	India	Mumbai Indians	Up to 15 April 2008	
Musavir Khote	India	Mumbai Indians	Up to 15 April 2008	
Dhawal Kulkarni^{[N-RAN]}	India	Mumbai Indians	Up to 15 April 2008	
Swapnil Singh	India	Mumbai Indians	Up to 15 April 2008	
Niraj Patel	India	Rajasthan Royals	Up to 15 April 2008	
Jaydev Shah	India	Rajasthan Royals	Up to 15 April 2008	
Mahesh Rawat	India	Rajasthan Royals	Up to 15 April 2008	
Aditya Angle	India	Rajasthan Royals	Up to 15 April 2008	
Sumit Khatri	India	Rajasthan Royals	Up to 15 April 2008	
Parag More	India	Rajasthan Royals	Up to 15 April 2008	
Siddharth Trivedi	India	Rajasthan Royals	Up to 15 April 2008	
Swapnil Asnodkar	India	Rajasthan Royals	Up to 15 April 2008	

^{N-RAN} N-RAN: Players having not played Ranji Trophy at the time of tournament.4

== Withdrawn and Replacement players ==
Players were signed as replacement of contracted players who were not available to play due to injuries and national commitments. Under IPL rules, the replacements cannot be paid more than the players they are replacing, though they can be paid less. The following players withdrew from the tournament either due to injuries or because of other reasons.

Players	Nationality	Team	Reason	Announcement date	Replacement Player	Nationality	Signing date	Ref
Justin Langer	Australia	Rajasthan Royals	Pre-existing contract with Somerset County	23 February 2008				
Morne Morkel	South Africa	Rajasthan Royals	Pre-existing contract with Yorkshire County	14 March 2008				
Shoaib Akhtar	Pakistan	Kolkata Knight Riders	Banned due to disciplinary reasons by PCB	3 April 2008	Allowed to play back on 4 May after suspension of Ban			
Sudeep Tyagi	India	Chennai Super Kings	Stress Fracture in the Back					
Nathan Bracken	Australia	Royal Challengers Bangalore	Knee Surgery Recovery	14 April 2008	Ashley Noffke	Australia	14 April 2008	
Lasith Malinga	Sri Lanka	Mumbai Indians	Knee Injury	19 April 2008	Dwayne Bravo	(Trinidad and Tobago) West Indies	19 April 2008	
Brendon McCullum	New Zealand	Kolkata Knight Riders	Replacement for players on International duty		Brad Hodge	Australia	26 April 2008	
Ricky Ponting	Australia	Kolkata Knight Riders	Replacement for players on International duty		Brad Hodge	Australia	26 April 2008	
Brett Lee	Australia	Kings XI Punjab	International Duty	28 April 2008				
Simon Katich	Australia	Kings XI Punjab	International Duty	28 April 2008				
Kyle Mills	New Zealand	Kings XI Punjab	International Duty	28 April 2008				
Harbhajan Singh	India	Mumbai Indians	Banned after slapping Sreesanth	28 April 2008				
Chris Gayle	(Jamaica) West Indies	Kolkata Knight Riders	Groin Injury and International Duty	29 April 2008				
Daniel Vettori	New Zealand	Delhi Daredevils	International Duty	30 April 2008				
Brendon McCullum	New Zealand	Kolkata Knight Riders	International Duty	30 April 2008				
Jacob Oram	New Zealand	Chennai Super Kings	International Duty	30 April 2008				
Ross Taylor	New Zealand	Royal Challengers Bangalore	International Duty	1 May 2008				
Ricky Ponting	Australia	Kolkata Knight Riders	International Duty	1 May 2008				
Matthew Hayden	Australia	Chennai Super Kings	International Duty	1 May 2008				
Michael Hussey	Australia	Chennai Super Kings	International Duty	1 May 2008				
Andrew Symonds	Australia	Deccan Chargers	International Duty	1 May 2008				
Ashley Noffke	Australia	Royal Challengers Bangalore	International Duty	1 May 2008				
Brad Hodge	Australia	Kolkata Knight Riders	International Duty	9 May 2008				
Dimitri Mascarenhas	England	Rajasthan Royals	County duty with Hampshire	12 May 2008				
Makhaya Ntini	South Africa	Chennai Super Kings	Replacement for players on International duty		Chamara Kapugedera	Sri Lanka	8 May 2008	
V. V. S. Laxman	India	Deccan Chargers	Hairline Fracture	12 May 2008				
Cheteshwar Pujara	India	Kolkata Knight Riders	Withdrawn by the team	13 May 2008				
Ranadeb Bose	India	Kolkata Knight Riders	Withdrawn by the team	13 May 2008				
Yashpal Singh	India	Kolkata Knight Riders	Withdrawn by the team	13 May 2008				
Saurasish Lahiri	India	Kolkata Knight Riders	Withdrawn by the team	13 May 2008				
Rohan Banerjee	India	Kolkata Knight Riders	Withdrawn by the team	13 May 2008				
Shivnarine Chanderpaul	(Guyana) West Indies	Royal Challengers Bangalore	International Duty	15 May 2008				
Ramnaresh Sarwan	(Guyana) West Indies	Kings XI Punjab	International Duty	15 May 2008				
Dwayne Bravo	(Trinidad and Tobago) West Indies	Mumbai Indians	International Duty	17 May 2008	Andre Nel	South Africa	17 May 2008	
Dwayne Bravo	(Trinidad and Tobago) West Indies	Mumbai Indians	International Duty	17 May 2008	Dwayne Smith	(Barbados) West Indies	19 May 2008	
		Kolkata Knight Riders	Replacement for players on International duty		Ajantha Mendis	Sri Lanka	18 May 2008	
Stephen Fleming	New Zealand	Chennai Super Kings	Birth of his child	29 May 2008				
Graeme Smith	South Africa	Rajasthan Royals	Hamstring Injury	31 May 2008				

== Support staff appointments ==
Staff	Nationality	Team	Role	Announcement date	Ref
Greg Shipperd	Australia	Delhi Daredevils	Coach	19 February 2008	
Tom Moody	Australia	Kings XI Punjab	Coach	18 February 2008	
John Buchanan	Australia	Kolkata Knight Riders	Coach	20 February 2008	
Robin Singh	India	Deccan Chargers	Coach	21 February 2008	
Kepler Wessels	South Africa	Chennai Super Kings	Coach	27 February 2008	
Shane Warne	Australia	Rajasthan Royals	Coach	28 February 2008	
Venkatesh Prasad	India	Royal Challengers Bangalore	Coach	13 March 2008	
Martin Crowe	New Zealand	Royal Challengers Bangalore	Chief Cricket Officer	13 March 2008	
Charu Sharma	India	Royal Challengers Bangalore	CEO	13 March 2008	
Neil Maxwell	Australia	Kings XI Punjab	CEO	18 March 2008	
Jeremy Snape	England	Rajasthan Royals	Performance Coach	8 April 2008	
Lalchand Rajput	India	Mumbai Indians	Coach	8 April 2008	
Harsha Bhogle	India	Mumbai Indians	Team Advisor	8 April 2008	
Dennis Lillee	Australia	Delhi Daredevils	Bowling consultant	17 April 2008	
