= Vijay Hazare Trophy =

List A cricket championship in India

- Countries: India
- Administrator: BCCI
- Format: List A cricket
- First edition: 1993–94
- Latest edition: 2025–26
- Next edition: 2026–27
- Tournament format: Round-robin, then knockout
- Number of teams: 38
- Current champion: Vidarbha (1st title)
- Most successful: Karnataka / Tamil Nadu (5 titles each)
- Most runs: Ankit Bawne (4,164) (Maharashtra)
- Most wickets: Siddarth Kaul (155) (Punjab)
- Website: https://www.bcci.tv
- 2026–27

The Vijay Hazare Trophy is a cricket tournament played in India. It is administered by the Board of Control for Cricket in India and is contested by state and city teams in a league and playoff format. Along with the inter-zonal Deodhar Trophy, it forms the top level of List A cricket in the country, and is an important feeder tournament for selection in the Indian National Cricket Team. Matches consist of 50 overs per side, similar to One Day International matches. It was initially a zonal tournament, and became a national tournament in 2002. Vidarbha are the defending champions, after having won the 2025-26 edition.

== History ==
The Vijay Hazare trophy began in the 1993–94 season as the Ranji One Day Trophy, a List A counterpart to the First-Class Ranji Trophy. In its early years, it was played at the zonal level. North, South, East, West, and Central Zones each produced their own winner, and success in this tournament was used to determine selection for zonal teams in the Deodhar Trophy. The most successful teams in this phase were Bombay/Mumbai (8 titles) and Bengal (6 titles).

It became a national competition in 2002–03, with a knockout stage crowning a national champion every year. The most successful teams since then have been Tamil Nadu and Karnataka (5 titles each). For the 2007-08 edition, it was renamed in honour of Vijay Hazare. Domestic cricket in India was suspended for several months because of the COVID-19 pandemic in India, leading to the cancellation of the 2020–21 Ranji Trophy. However, the BCCI announced that the 2020/21 edition of the Vijay Hazare tournament would take place.

== Format ==
The format of the national-level tournament has changed several times. During the 2002–03 and 2003–04 seasons, a final round-robin stage was held for the top teams in each zone. Since the 2004–05 tournament, a playoff format including semi-finals and a final has been held, with varying qualification mechanisms. Teams are currently grouped on the basis of average points gained in the preceding three seasons.

Between the 2015–16 and 2017–18 seasons, the tournament consisted of 28 teams divided into four groups. For the 2018/19 edition, the teams were divided into three elite groups and one plate group. Two of the elite groups had nine teams while the third had ten. The plate group consisted of nine new teams.

The current format consists of 38 teams divided into 4 elite groups and 1 plate group. The elite groups have 8 teams while the plate group has 6. After playing each team in the group once, the five winners and the best performing runner-up qualify for the quarter final stage directly, while the four other runners-up play in the preliminary quarter finals. The two winners of pre-quarter finals join the remaining six teams in the quarter final stage.

== Results ==
Zonal tournaments
Edition	Zone winners					Most runs	Most wickets	Ref
Edition	Central	East	North	South	West	Most runs	Most wickets	Ref
1993–94	Uttar Pradesh	Bengal	Haryana	Karnataka	Mumbai	Rahul Dravid (Karnataka)	Dhanraj Singh (Haryana)	
1994–95	Madhya Pradesh	Bengal	Punjab	Hyderabad	Maharashtra	Ajay Sharma (Delhi)	Arindam Sarkar (Bengal)	
1995–96	Uttar Pradesh	Bengal	Haryana	Karnataka	Mumbai	S. Ramesh (Tamil Nadu)	K. N. Ananthapadmanabhan (Kerala); S. Joshi (Karnataka); S. Mukherjee (Bengal); S. Sharma (Punjab)	
1996–97	Madhya Pradesh	Assam	Delhi	Tamil Nadu	Mumbai	Sanjay Manjrekar (Mumbai)	Hanumara Ramkishen (Andhra Pradesh)	
1997–98	Madhya Pradesh	Bengal	Delhi	Tamil Nadu	Mumbai	Sujith Somasunder (Karnataka)	Rahul Sanghvi (Karnataka)	
1998–99	Madhya Pradesh	Bengal	Punjab	Karnataka	Mumbai	Vijay Bharadwaj (Karnataka)	Jaswant Rai (Himachal Pradesh); N. Singh (Hyderabad)	
1999-00	Madhya Pradesh	Bengal	Delhi	Tamil Nadu	Mumbai	Mohammad Azharuddin (Hyderabad)	T. Pawan Kumar (Hyderabad)	
2000–01	Madhya Pradesh	Orissa	Punjab	Tamil Nadu	Mumbai	Amit Pathak (Andhra Pradesh)	Venkatapathy Raju (Hyderabad); R. Sanghvi (Delhi)	
2001–02	Railways	Orissa	Punjab	Karnataka	Mumbai	Sandeep Sharma (Himachal Pradesh)	Anup Dave (Rajasthan); J. Gokulakrishnan (Assam); L. Patel (Gujarat); V. Sharma (Punjab)	

National tournaments
Edition	Final host	Winner	Runner-up	Most runs	Most wickets	Ref
2002-03	No final	Tamil Nadu	Punjab	Niranjan Godbole (Maharashtra)	Iqbal Siddiqui (Maharashtra)	
2003–04	No final	Mumbai	Bengal	Devang Gandhi (Bengal)	Sarandeep Singh (Delhi)	
2004–05	Wankhede Stadium, Mumbai	Shared: Tamil Nadu and Uttar Pradesh		Vidyut Sivaramakrishnan (Tamil Nadu)	Ranadeb Bose (Bengal); Praveen Kumar (Uttar Pradesh)	
2005–06	Wankhede Stadium, Mumbai	Railways	Uttar Pradesh	Dinesh Mongia (Punjab)	Sankalp Vohra (Baroda)	
2006–07	Sawai Mansingh Stadium, Jaipur	Mumbai	Rajasthan	Wasim Jaffer (Mumbai)	D. Tamil Kumaran (Tamil Nadu)	
2007–08	ACA–VDCA Cricket Stadium, Visakhapatnam	Saurashtra	Bengal	Ajinkya Rahane (Mumbai)	Vishal Bhatia (Himachal Pradesh)	
2008–09	Maharaja Bir Bikram College Stadium, Agartala	Tamil Nadu	Bengal	Virat Kohli (Delhi)	Shoaib Ahmed (Hyderabad)	
2009–10	Sardar Patel Gujarat Stadium, Ahmedabad	Tamil Nadu	Bengal	Shreevats Goswami (Bengal)	Yo Mahesh (Tamil Nadu)	
2010–11	Holkar Stadium, Indore	Jharkhand	Gujarat	Ishank Jaggi (Jharkhand)	Amit Mishra (Haryana)	
2011–12	Arun Jaitley Cricket Stadium, Delhi	Bengal	Mumbai	Wriddhiman Saha (Bengal)	Parvinder Awana (Delhi)	
2012–13	ACA–VDCA Cricket Stadium, Visakhapatnam	Delhi	Assam	Robin Uthappa (Karnataka)	Pritam Das (Assam)	
2013–14	Eden Gardens, Kolkata	Karnataka	Railways	Robin Uthappa (Karnataka)	Vinay Kumar (Karnataka)	
2014–15	Sardar Patel Gujarat Stadium, Ahmedabad	Karnataka	Punjab	Manish Pandey (Karnataka)	Abhimanyu Mithun (Karnataka)	
2015–16	M. Chinnaswamy Stadium, Bengaluru	Gujarat	Delhi	Mandeep Singh (Punjab)	Jasprit Bumrah (Gujarat)	
2016–17	Arun Jaitley Cricket Stadium, Delhi	Tamil Nadu	Bengal	Dinesh Karthik (Tamil Nadu)	Aswin Crist (Tamil Nadu)	
2017–18	Arun Jaitley Cricket Stadium, Delhi	Karnataka	Saurashtra	Mayank Agarwal (Karnataka)	Mohammed Siraj (Hyderabad)	
2018–19	M. Chinnaswamy Stadium, Bengaluru	Mumbai	Delhi	Abhinav Mukund (Tamil Nadu)	Shahbaz Nadeem (Jharkhand)	
2019–20	M. Chinnaswamy Stadium, Bengaluru	Karnataka	Tamil Nadu	Devdutt Padikkal (Karnataka)	Pritam Das (Assam)	
2020–21	Arun Jaitley Cricket Stadium, Delhi	Mumbai	Uttar Pradesh	Prithvi Shaw (Mumbai)	Shivam Sharma (Uttar Pradesh)	
2021–22	Sawai Mansingh Stadium, Jaipur	Himachal Pradesh	Tamil Nadu	Ruturaj Gaikwad (Maharashtra)	Yash Thakur (Vidarbha)	
2022–23	Narendra Modi Stadium, Ahmedabad	Saurashtra	Maharashtra	Narayan Jagadeesan (Tamil Nadu)	Vasuki Koushik (Karnataka)	
2023–24	Niranjan Shah Stadium, Rajkot	Haryana	Rajasthan	Arslan Khan (Chandigarh)	Harshal Patel (Haryana)	
2024–25	Baroda Cricket Association Stadium, Vadodara	Karnataka	Vidarbha	Karun Nair (Vidarbha)	Arshdeep Singh (Punjab)	
2025–26	National Cricket Academy, Bengaluru	Vidarbha	Saurashtra	Aman Mokhade (Vidarbha)	Ankur Panwar (Saurashtra)	

Finals Appearances by Team
Team	Winner	Runner-up	Most Recent Win	Most Recent Runner up
Tamil Nadu	5	2	2016–17	2021–22
Karnataka	5	0	2024–25	-
Mumbai	4	1	2020–21	2011–12
Saurashtra	2	2	2022–23	2025–26
Bengal	1	5	2011–12	2016–17
Uttar Pradesh	1	2	2004–05	2020–21
Delhi	1	2	2012–13	2018–19
Railways	1	1	2005–06	2013–14
Gujarat	1	1	2015–16	2010–11
Vidarbha	1	1	2025–26	2024–25
Jharkhand	1	0	2010–11	-
Himachal Pradesh	1	0	2021–22	-
Haryana	1	0	2023–24	-
Punjab	0	2	-	2014–15
Rajasthan	0	2	-	2023–24
Assam	0	1	-	2012–13
Maharashtra	0	1	-	2022–23

== Records ==
This is a list of records in the Vijay Hazare Trophy. It is current as of 31 December 2025.

Team Records
Category	Team	Record
Most National Championships	Karnataka	5
Most National Championships	Tamil Nadu	5
Most Zonal Championships	Mumbai	8
Highest Innings Total	Bihar	574/6
Lowest Innings Total	Rajasthan	35
Highest Match Aggregate	Jharkhand vs Karnataka	825
Lowest Match Aggregate	Rajasthan vs Railways	74
Largest Victory Margin	Tamil Nadu vs Arunachal	435
Most Extras in an Innings	Jharkhand	47
Highest Winning Percentage	Karnataka	77.73

Batting Records
Category	Player	Record
Most Runs	Ankit Bawne	4164
Highest Individual Score	Narayan Jagadeesan	277
Highest Batting Average (min 10 matches)	Devdutt Padikkal	92.96
Highest Batting Strike Rate	Rajagopal Sathish	134.58
Most Centuries	Ankit Bawne	15
Most Half Centuries	Ankit Bawne	17
Most Runs in a season	Narayan Jagadeesan	830
Highest Partnership	Sai Sudarshan and Narayan Jagadeesan	416

Bowling Records
Category	Player	Record
Most Wickets	Siddarth Kaul	155
Best Bowling Figures	Shahbaz Nadeem	8/10
Best Bowling Average (min 100 overs)	Varun Chakravarthy	14.13
Best Economy Rate (min 100 overs)	Iresh Saxena	3.61
Best Strike Rate (min 100 overs)	Varun Chakravarthy	19.81
Most 5 Wicket Hauls	Siddarth Kaul	7
Most Wickets in a Season	Vinay Kumar	28

Wicketkeeping Records
Category	Player	Record
Most Dismissals	Aditya Tare	133
Most Catches	Aditya Tare	115
Most Stumpings	Parthiv Patel	21
Most Dismissals in a Match	Mahesh Rawat	7
Most Dismissals in a Match	Keenan Vaz	7
Most Dismissals in a Match	Ishan Kishan	7
Most Dismissals in a Season	Kunal Singh Rathore	24

Fielding Records
Category	Player	Record
Most Catches	Manish Pandey	68
Most Catches in a Match	Vignesh Puthur	6
Most Catches in a Season	Manish Pandey	14

Other Individual Records
Category	Player	Record
Most Matches	Manish Pandey	103
Most Matches as Captain	Parthiv Patel	67

== Salary ==
The BCCI increased the match fees in 2024 to allow it to compete with lucrative tournaments like the IPL. Match fees depend on a player's level, which is calculated using the total number of matches they have played in the Vijay Hazare Trophy throughout their career. Players who are on the bench but do not play in the match receive half fees.

Salary Per Match
Category	Number of Matches	Match Fees (Starting 11)	Match Fees (Bench)
Senior	>40	₹60,000	₹30,000
Mid Level	21 - 40	₹50,000	₹25,000
Junior	0 - 20	₹40,000	₹20,000

== See also ==
- Deodhar Trophy
- Duleep Trophy
- Irani Cup
- Ranji Trophy
- Syed Mushtaq Ali Trophy
