= 2006–07 Ranji One Day Trophy =

Indian cricket tournament

- Dates: 10 February – 28 March 2007
- Administrator(s): BCCI
- Cricket format: List A cricket
- Tournament format(s): Round-robin and Playoff format
- Host(s): Various
- Champions: Mumbai (2nd title)
- Runners-up: Rajasthan
- Participants: 27
- Matches: 69
- Most runs: Wasim Jaffer (394) (Mumbai)
- Most wickets: Dakshinamoorthy Kumaran (16) (Tamil Nadu)

The 2006–07 Ranji One Day Trophy was the 14th edition of India's annual List A cricket tournament, which became the Vijay Hazare Trophy later in 2007. It was contested between 27 domestic cricket teams of India, starting in February and finishing in March 2007. In the final, Mumbai beat Rajasthan by 72 runs to win their second title.

== Group Matches ==
Central Zone

Team	Played	W	L	Tied	NR	Points
Uttar Pradesh	4	3	1	0	0	15
Rajasthan	4	3	1	0	0	11
Madhya Pradesh	4	3	1	0	0	9
Railways	4	3	1	0	0	3
Vidarbha	4	3	1	0	0	2

- Uttar Pradesh and Rajasthan qualified for the knockout stage.

East Zone

Team	Played	W	L	Tied	NR	Points
Assam	4	3	0	0	1	15
Bengal	4	3	0	0	1	14
Orissa	4	1	2	0	1	6
Jharkhand	4	1	3	0	0	5
Tripura	4	0	3	0	1	0

- Assam and Bengal qualified for the knockout stage.

North Zone

Team	Played	W	L	Tied	NR	Points
Punjab	5	4	0	0	1	21
Delhi	5	3	1	0	1	16
Haryana	5	2	1	0	2	13
Himachal Pradesh	5	1	2	0	2	7
Jammu and Kashmir	5	1	3	0	1	5
Services	5	0	4	0	1	-2

- Punjab and Delhi qualified for the knockout stage.

South Zone

Team	Played	W	L	Tied	NR	Points
Karnataka	5	5	0	0	0	23
Tamil Nadu	5	4	1	0	0	18
Kerala	5	2	2	1	0	9
Hyderabad	5	1	3	1	0	5
Goa	5	1	4	0	0	3
Andhra Pradesh	5	1	4	0	0	2

- Karnataka and Tamil Nadu qualified for the knockout stage.

West Zone

Team	Played	W	L	Tied	NR	Points
Maharashtra	4	4	0	0	0	18
Mumbai	4	3	1	0	0	13
Baroda	4	2	2	0	0	8
Saurashtra	4	1	3	0	0	2
Gujarat	4	0	4	0	0	-1

- Maharashtra and Mumbai qualified for the knockout stage.

== Knockout Matches ==
=== Preliminary Quarterfinal 1 ===
16 March 2007
Scorecard

Assam; 127 (43.4 overs)	v	Tamil Nadu; 128/6 (39.5 overs)
Zakaria Zuffri 30 (72); Dakshinamoorthy Kumaran 3/20 (10 overs)		Hemang Badani 48* (71); Abu Nechim 2/30 (9.5 overs)

Tamil Nadu won by 4 wickets
Himachal Pradesh Cricket Association Stadium, Dharamsala
Umpires: H Gopinath and Krishna Hariharan

- Tamil Nadu won the toss and elected to field.

=== Preliminary Quarterfinal 2 ===
16 March 2007
Scorecard

Karnataka; 216/9 (50 overs)	v	Bengal; 184 (48 overs)
Yere Goud 66 (104); Ranadeb Bose 4/36 (10 overs)		Wriddhiman Saha 44 (84); Sunil Joshi 4/28 (8 overs)

Karnataka won by 32 runs
Himachal Pradesh Cricket Association Stadium, Dharamsala
Umpires: Tej Handu and Krishna Hariharan

- Bengal won the toss and elected to field.

=== Quarterfinal 1 ===
20 March 2007
Scorecard

Uttar Pradesh; 258/7 (50 overs)	v	Tamil Nadu; 63/2 (18 overs)
Tanmay Srivastava 102 (136); Dakshinamoorthy Kumaran 3/53 (9 overs)		Srikkanth Anirudha 31 (41); R. P. Singh 1/23 (6 overs)

Uttar Pradesh won faster scoring rate (revised target)
Feroz Shah Kotla, Delhi
Umpires: Jasbir Singh and Sekhon

- Tamil Nadu won the toss and elected to field.

=== Quarterfinal 2 ===
18 March 2007
Scorecard

Delhi; 297/5 (50 overs)	v	Mumbai; 301/4 (49 overs)
Gautam Gambhir 105 (96); Aavishkar Salvi 2/64 (8 overs)		Wasim Jaffer 170 (160); Rajat Bhatia 1/35 (7 overs)

Mumbai won by 6 wickets
Feroz Shah Kotla, Delhi
Umpires: Arani Jayaprakash and Ivaturi Shivram

- Mumbai won the toss and elected to field.

=== Quarterfinal 3 ===
19 March 2007
Scorecard

Maharashtra; 121 (40.3 overs)	v	Punjab; 122/3 (29.5 overs)
Shrikant Munde 26 (61); Gagandeep Singh 3/21 (10 overs)		Ravneet Ricky 53 (98); Jitendra Patil 1/26 (4 overs)

Maharashtra won by 7 wickets
Feroz Shah Kotla, Delhi
Umpires: Arani Jayaprakash and Ivaturi Shivram

- Punjab won the toss and elected to field.

=== Quarterfinal 4 ===
21 March 2007
Scorecard

Karnataka; 200/9 (50 overs)	v	Rajasthan; 202/4 (45.2 overs)
Balachandra Akhil 86 (73); Afroz Khan 3/56 (10 overs)		Anshu Jain 76 (107); C Raghu 2/46 (10 overs)

Rajasthan won by 6 wickets
Feroz Shah Kotla, Delhi
Umpires: Jasbir Singh and Sekhon

- Rajasthan won the toss and elected to field.

=== Semifinal 1 ===
25 March 2007
Scorecard

Uttar Pradesh; 224/6 (50 overs)	v	Mumbai; 228/9 (49 overs)
Mohammad Kaif 64 (90); Nilesh Kulkarni 3/41 (10 overs)		Ajinkya Rahane 74 (100); Piyush Chawla 4/47 (10 overs)

Mumbai won by 1 wicket
Sawai Mansingh Stadium, Jaipur
Umpires: GA Pratapkumar and Ravi Subramanian

- Uttar Pradesh won the toss and elected to field.

=== Semifinal 2 ===
26 March 2007
Scorecard

Punjab; 261/6 (50 overs)	v	Rajasthan; 262/7 (49 overs)
Karan Goel 72 (96); Kuldeep Singh 2/43 (9 overs)		Rohit Sharma 62 (72); Rajesh Sharma 2/50 (10 overs)

Rajasthan won by 3 wickets
Sawai Mansingh Stadium, Jaipur
Umpires: Shashank Ranade and Subroto Porel

- Punjab won the toss and elected to field.

== Final ==
28 March 2007
Scorecard

Mumbai; 287/6 (50 overs)	v	Rajasthan; 215 (46.1 overs)
Vinayak Mane 86 (108); Rohit Sharma 1/14 (2 overs)		Afroz Khan 54 (67); Ramesh Powar 3/53 (10 overs)

Mumbai won by 72 runs
Sawai Mansingh Stadium, Jaipur
Umpires: GA Pratapkumar and Krishna Hariharan
Player of the match: Vinayak Mane (Mumbai)

- Rajasthan won the toss and elected to field.
