= 2011–12 Vijay Hazare Trophy =

Indian cricket tournament

- Dates: 20 February – 12 March 2012
- Administrator(s): BCCI
- Cricket format: List A cricket
- Tournament format(s): Round-robin and Playoff format
- Host(s): Various
- Champions: Bengal (1st title)
- Runners-up: Mumbai
- Participants: 27
- Matches: 69
- Most runs: Wriddhiman Saha (395) (Bengal)
- Most wickets: Parvinder Awana (16) (Delhi)

The 2011–12 Vijay Hazare Trophy was the 19th edition of the Vijay Hazare Trophy, an annual List A cricket tournament in India. It was contested between 27 domestic cricket teams of India, starting on 20 February and finishing on 12 March 2012. In the final, Bengal beat Mumbai by 6 wickets to win their maiden title.

== Group Matches ==
Central Zone

Team	Played	W	L	Tied	NR	Points
Railways	4	3	1	0	0	13
Madhya Pradesh	4	2	2	0	0	8
Uttar Pradesh	4	2	2	0	0	8
Vidarbha	4	2	2	0	0	8
Rajasthan	4	1	3	0	0	3

- Railways and Madhya Pradesh qualified for the knockout stage.

East Zone

Team	Played	W	L	Tied	NR	Points
Bengal	4	4	0	0	0	19
Assam	4	3	1	0	0	12
Odisha	4	2	2	0	0	8
Jharkhand	4	1	3	0	0	3
Tripura	4	0	4	0	0	-2

- Bengal and Assam qualified for the knockout stage.

North Zone

Team	Played	W	L	Tied	NR	Points
Delhi	5	5	0	0	0	24
Punjab	5	4	1	0	0	17
Haryana	5	3	2	0	0	14
Himachal Pradesh	5	2	3	0	0	5
Services	5	1	4	0	0	1
Jammu and Kashmir	5	0	5	0	0	-1

- Delhi and Punjab qualified for the knockout stage.

South Zone

Team	Played	W	L	Tied	NR	Points
Karnataka	5	4	1	0	0	18
Hyderabad	5	4	1	0	0	16
Tamil Nadu	5	3	2	0	0	14
Goa	5	2	3	0	0	9
Kerala	5	1	4	0	0	2
Andhra Pradesh	5	1	4	0	0	1

- Karnataka and Hyderabad qualified for the knockout stage.

West Zone

Team	Played	W	L	Tied	NR	Points
Mumbai	4	3	1	0	0	12
Maharashtra	4	3	1	0	0	11
Baroda	4	2	2	0	0	9
Gujarat	4	2	2	0	0	9
Kerala	4	0	4	0	0	-1

- Mumbai and Maharashtra qualified for the knockout stage.

== Knockout Matches ==
=== Preliminary Quarterfinal 1 ===
5 March 2012
Scorecard

Maharashtra; 186/9 (50 overs)	v	Punjab; 192/8 (48.2 overs)
Nikhil Paradkar 42 (57); Harbhajan Singh 3/35 (10 overs)		Harbhajan Singh 79 (94); Mohsin Sayyed 3/41 (10 overs)

Punjab won by 2 wickets
Palam A Ground, Model Sports Complex, Delhi
Umpires: Chettithody Shamshuddin and Sundaram Ravi
Player of the match: Harbhajan Singh (Punjab)

- Maharashtra won the toss and elected to bat.

=== Preliminary Quarterfinal 2 ===
5 March 2012
Scorecard

Assam; 94 (32.5 overs)	v	Delhi; 96/2 (20.2 overs)
Dheeraj Jhadav 23 (44); Varun Sood 4/36 (6.5 overs)		Shikhar Dhawan 42* (60); Deepak Gohain 1/17 (4.2 overs)

Delhi won by 8 wickets
Arun Jaitley Stadium, Delhi
Umpires: Amardeep Pathania and Sudhir Asnani
Player of the match: Varun Sood (Delhi)

- Delhi won the toss and elected to field.

=== Quarterfinal 1 ===
6 March 2012
Scorecard

Bengal; 230/8 (45 overs)	v	Madhya Pradesh; 215 (44.3 overs)
Anustup Majumdar 55 (57); Jalaj Saxena 2/52 (9 overs)		Anand Singh 53 (54); Ashok Dinda 5/54 (9 overs)

Bengal won by 15 runs
Palam A Ground, Model Sports Complex, Delhi
Umpires: Chettithody Shamshuddin and Sundaram Ravi
Player of the match: Ashok Dinda (Bengal)

- Bengal won the toss and elected to field first.
- Match was reduced to 45 overs per side due to fog.

=== Quarterfinal 2 ===
6 March 2012
Scorecard

Karnataka; 178/9 (50 overs)	v	Mumbai; 179/1 (29.1 overs)
Raju Bhatkal 38 (76); Kshemal Waingankar 3/19 (10 overs)		Ajinkya Rahane 71* (80); Abrar Kazi 1/45 (8 overs)

Mumbai won by 9 wickets
Arun Jaitley Stadium, Delhi
Umpires: Amardeep Pathania and Sudhir Asnani
Player of the match: Kshemal Waingankar (Mumbai)

- Mumbai won the toss and elected to field.

=== Quarterfinal 3 ===
7 March 2012
Scorecard

Hyderabad; 175 (49.2 overs)	v	Punjab; 179/5 (41.1 overs)
Ibrahim Khaleel 46 (51); Bipul Sharma 4/31 (10 overs)		Chandan Madan 78* (120); Anwar Ahmed 2/19 (4 overs)

Punjab won by 5 wickets
Palam A Ground, Model Sports Complex, Delhi
Umpires: Manish Bhatia and Ravi Kiran
Player of the match: Bipul Sharma (Punjab)

- Hyderabad won the toss and elected to bat.

=== Quarterfinal 4 ===
7 March 2012
Scorecard

Railways; 175 (49.1 overs)	v	Delhi; 178/3 (37.4 overs)
Ashish Yadav 59 (79); Rajat Bhatia 3/30 (10 overs)		Shikhar Dhawan 69 (69); Sanjay Bangar 1/31 (7 overs)

Delhi won by 7 wickets
Arun Jaitley Stadium, Delhi
Umpires: Chettithody Shamshuddin and Sundaram Ravi
Player of the match: Shikhar Dhawan (Delhi)

- Delhi won the toss and elected to field.

=== Semifinal 1 ===
10 March 2012
Scorecard

Punjab; 205/8 (50 overs)	v	Bengal; 208/7 (48.5 overs)
Mandeep Singh 66 (110); Sourav Sarkar 2/24 (7 overs)		Wriddhiman Saha 53* (71); Rajwinder Singh 3/19 (9 overs)

Bengal won by 3 wickets
Arun Jaitley Stadium, Delhi
Umpires: Vinay Choudhary and Anil Chaudhary
Player of the match: Wriddhiman Saha (Bengal)

- Punjab won the toss and elected to bat.

=== Semifinal 2 ===
10 March 2012
Scorecard

Mumbai; 295/5 (50 overs)	v	Delhi; 155 (45 overs)
Wasim Jaffer 92 (110); Parvinder Awana 2/76 (10 overs)		Jagrit Anand 51 (88); Anup Revandkar 3/37 (10 overs)

Mumbai won by 140 runs
Arun Jaitley Stadium, Delhi
Umpires: Amardeep Pathania and Krishnaraj Srinath
Player of the match: Wasim Jaffer (Mumbai)

- Mumbai won the toss and elected to field.

== Final ==
12 March 2012
Scorecard

Mumbai; 248 (49.2 overs)	v	Bengal; 252/4 (46.1 overs)
Wasim Jaffer 61 (48); Laxmi Shukla 4/38 (9.2 overs)		Laxmi Shukla 106* (90); Ajit Agarkar 1/40 (9.1 overs)

Bengal won by 6 wickets
Arun Jaitley Stadium, Delhi
Umpires: Krishnaraj Srinath and Subrat Das
Player of the match: Laxmi Shukla (Bengal)

- Mumbai won the toss and elected to bat.
