= 1987–88 Ranji Trophy =

1987-88 Ranji Trophy
- The Ranji Trophy, which the winners get.
- Administrator: BCCI
- Cricket format: First-class cricket
- Tournament format(s): League and knockout
- Champions: Tamil Nadu (2nd title)
- Most runs: Brijesh Patel (Karnataka) (596)
- Most wickets: M. Venkataramana (Tamil Nadu) (35)

The 1987–88 Ranji Trophy was the 54th season of the Ranji Trophy. Tamil Nadu defeated Railways by an innings in the final.

== Group stage ==
=== North Zone ===
Team	Pld	W	L	D	T	NR	Pts	Q
Delhi	5	3	0	2	0	0	83	3.367
Punjab	5	2	0	3	0	0	68	2.361
Haryana	5	2	0	3	0	0	64	1.172
Services	5	1	2	2	0	0	50	0.864
Jammu and Kashmir	5	1	2	2	0	0	48	0.763
Himachal Pradesh	5	0	5	0	0	0	9	0.203

=== Central Zone ===
Team	Pld	W	L	D	T	NR	Pts	Q
Railways	4	2	0	2	0	0	53	1.521
Uttar Pradesh	4	0	0	4	0	0	51	1.252
Rajasthan	4	1	0	3	0	0	47	0.995
Vidarbha	4	0	2	2	0	0	38	0.772
Madhya Pradesh	4	0	1	3	0	0	36	0.768

=== West Zone ===
Team	Pld	W	L	D	T	NR	Pts	Q
Baroda	4	1	0	3	0	0	53	1.237
Bombay	4	1	0	3	0	0	46	1.548
Maharashtra	4	0	0	4	0	0	45	1.103
Gujarat	4	0	1	3	0	0	37	0.669
Saurashtra	4	0	1	3	0	0	30	0.780

=== South Zone ===
Team	Pld	W	L	D	T	NR	Pts	Q
Tamil Nadu	5	3	1	1	0	0	79	1.479
Karnataka	5	2	0	3	0	0	78	1.358
Hyderabad	5	1	0	4	0	0	69	1.534
Andhra	5	0	1	4	0	0	53	0.813
Kerala	5	0	2	3	0	0	41	0.729
Goa	5	0	2	3	0	0	34	0.584

=== East Zone ===
Team	Pld	W	L	D	T	NR	Pts	Q
Bihar	4	2	0	2	0	0	66	2.328
Bengal	4	1	0	3	0	0	60	2.194
Orissa	4	2	0	2	0	0	58	1.026
Assam	4	1	2	1	0	0	42	0.732
Tripura	4	0	4	0	0	0	9	0.219

== Knockout stage ==
Pre-Quarter-finals
12 Feb 1988 — Varanasi
Uttar Pradesh (T)	301
Baroda	7/0
12 Feb 1988 — Bombay
Bombay (F)	408 & 137/4
Karnataka	396

Quarter-finals
29 Feb 1988 — Madras
Tamil Nadu (F)	578 & 493/8d
Uttar Pradesh	190 & 31/0
27 Feb 1988 — Chandigarh
Punjab (Q)	391/4
Bengal	414/6
27 Feb 1988 — Delhi
Railways (F)	483/4d & 49/0
Bihar	320
27 Feb 1988 — Delhi
Delhi (F)	508
Bombay	329 & 203/5

Semi-finals
11 Mar 1988 — Madras
Tamil Nadu (F)	601 & 157/6
Punjab	416
11 Mar 1988 — Delhi
Railways (Q)	140/3
Delhi	230/5

Finals
25 Mar 1988 — Madras
Tamil Nadu	709
Railways	317 & 248

(F) - Advanced to next round on First Innings Lead.
(T) - Advanced to next round on Coin Toss.
(Q) - Advanced to next round on better Quotient.

=== Final ===
25–30 March 1988
Scorecard

Railways	v	Tamil Nadu (H)
317 (114.3 overs); Naresh Churi 112; M. Venkataramana 7/94		709 (234 overs); Robin Singh 131; Hyder Ali 3/139
248 (85 overs); Prakash Karkera 48; S. Vasudevan 7/59

Tamil Nadu won by an innings and 144 runs
M. A. Chidambaram Stadium, Madras
Umpires: M. G. Deshpande, B. Jamula
Player of the match: M. Venkataramana

- Railways won the toss and decided to bat

== Scorecards and averages ==
- CricketArchive
