= 2026–27 Vijay Hazare Trophy =

Indian cricket tournament

2026-27 Vijay Hazare Trophy
- Dates: 14 December 2026 – 8 January 2027
- Administrator: BCCI
- Cricket format: List A cricket
- Tournament format: Round-robin then knockout
- Participants: 38
- Matches: 135
- Official website: Vijay Hazare Trophy

The 2026–27 Vijay Hazare Trophy was the 34th edition of the Vijay Hazare Trophy, an annual List A tournament in India. The tournament took place from 14 December 2026 to 8 January 2027 and featured all 38 teams from the Ranji Trophy. The teams were divided into four elite groups, consisting of eight teams each, and one plate group comprising six teams. The tournament was a part of the 2026–27 Indian domestic cricket season, as announced by the Board of Control for Cricket in India (BCCI) in 2026. Vidarbha were the defending champions.

== Participants ==
Group A	Group B	Group C	Group D	Plate Group
Vidarbha	Saurashtra	Punjab	Karnataka	Sikkim
Madhya Pradesh	Mumbai	Delhi	Uttar Pradesh	Manipur
Baroda	Haryana	Maharashtra	Kerala	Nagaland
Railways	Jharkhand	Chhattisgarh	Bengal	Meghalaya
Tamil Nadu	Gujarat	Himachal Pradesh	Tripura	Arunchal Pradesh
Uttarakhand	Jammu & Kashmir	Goa	Odisha	Mizoram
Andhra	Hyderabad	Rajasthan	Assam	-
Bihar	Services	Chandigarh	Pondicherry	-
