= Waingankar =

Waingankar is a surname. Notable people with the surname include:

- Makarand Waingankar, ex-cricket administrator and cricket columnist based in Mumbai, India
- Kshemal Waingankar (born 1985), Indian cricketer
