= 2003–04 Ranji One Day Trophy =

The 2003–04 Ranji One Day Trophy was the eleventh edition of India's annual List A cricket tournament, which became the Vijay Hazare Trophy in 2007. It was contested between 27 domestic cricket teams in January and February 2004. Mumbai won the final group.

== Group stage ==
2003–04 Ranji One Day Trophy
- Dates: 1 January – 10 February 2004
- Administrator(s): BCCI
- Cricket format: List A cricket
- Tournament format(s): Round-robin
- Host(s): Various
- Champions: Mumbai
- Participants: 27
- Matches: 70
- Most runs: Devang Gandhi (485) (Bengal)
- Most wickets: Sarandeep Singh (17) (Delhi)

=== Central Zone ===
Rank	Team	Pld	W	L	T	NR	Pts	NRR
1	Rajasthan	4	3	1	0	0	12	+0.200
2	Madhya Pradesh	4	2	2	0	0	10	+0.447
3	Vidarbha	4	2	2	0	0	7	-0.132
4	Uttar Pradesh	4	2	2	0	0	7	-0.306
5	Railways	4	1	3	0	0	4	-0.180

=== East Zone ===
Rank	Team	Pld	W	L	T	NR	Pts	NRR
1	Bengal	4	4	0	0	0	19	+1.885
2	Assam	4	2	2	0	0	9	+0.013
3	Bihar	4	2	2	0	0	8	+0.148
4	Orissa	4	2	2	0	0	6	-0.520
5	Tripura	4	0	4	0	0	-2	-1.283

=== North Zone ===
Rank	Team	Pld	W	L	T	NR	Pts	NRR
1	Delhi	5	5	0	0	0	23	+1.292
2	Punjab	5	4	1	0	0	20	+1.227
3	Services	5	3	2	0	0	12	+0.204
4	Haryana	5	2	3	0	0	8	-0.166
5	Himachal Pradesh	5	1	4	0	0	1	-1.112
6	Jammu and Kashmir	5	0	5	0	0	-4	-1.637

=== South Zone ===
Rank	Team	Pld	W	L	T	NR	Pts	NRR
1	Tamil Nadu	5	4	1	0	0	17	+0.384
2	Kerala	5	4	1	0	0	17	+0.276
3	Karnataka	5	3	2	0	0	13	+0.124
4	Andhra Pradesh	5	2	3	0	0	7	-0.216
5	Hyderabad	5	1	4	0	0	1	+0.104
6	Goa	5	1	4	0	0	2	-0.654

=== West Zone ===
Rank	Team	Pld	W	L	T	NR	Pts	NRR
1	Mumbai	4	4	0	0	0	17	+0.752
2	Baroda	4	3	1	0	0	11	-0.324
3	Maharashtra	4	2	2	0	0	8	+0.204
4	Saurashtra	4	1	3	0	0	4	-0.262
5	Hyderabad	4	0	4	0	0	0	-0.402

== Final Group ==
Rank	Team	Pld	W	L	T	NR	Pts	NRR
1	Mumbai	4	3	1	0	0	13	+0.419
2	Bengal	4	3	1	0	0	12	+0.297
3	Delhi	4	3	1	0	0	12	+0.167
4	Tamil Nadu	4	1	3	0	0	4	+0.437
5	Rajasthan	4	0	4	0	0	-1	-1.382
