= 2004–05 Ranji One Day Trophy =

Indian cricket tournament

- Dates: 9 January – 14 April 2005
- Administrator(s): BCCI
- Cricket format: List A cricket
- Tournament format(s): Round-robin and Playoff format
- Host(s): Various
- Champions: Uttar Pradesh (1st title) and Tamil Nadu (2nd title)
- Participants: 27
- Matches: 69
- Most runs: Vidyut Sivaramakrishnan (493) (Tamil Nadu)
- Most wickets: Ranadeb Bose (15) (Bengal)

The 2004–05 Ranji One Day Trophy was the twelfth edition of India's annual List A cricket tournament, which became the Vijay Hazare Trophy in 2007. It was contested between 27 domestic cricket teams, starting in January and finishing in April 2005. The final was tied between Uttar Pradesh and Tamil Nadu, and they shared the trophy.

== Knockout rounds ==
=== Quarterfinals ===
Quarterfinal 1
9 April 2005
Scorecard

Mumbai; 289/4 (50 overs)	v	Orissa; 131 (33.1 overs)
Amol Muzumdar 65 (86); Sukanta Khatua 2/73 (10 overs)		Rashmi Parida 33 (35); Sairaj Bahutule 5/24 (8 overs)

Mumbai won by 158 runs
Wankhede Stadium, Mumbai
Umpires: Jasbir Singh and KS Giridharan

- Orissa won the toss and elected to field
- Paresh Patel and Sukanta Khatua (Orissa) made their List A debuts

Quarterfinal 2
9 April 2005
Scorecard

Uttar Pradesh; 251 (49.3 overs)	v	Punjab; 215 (47.1 overs)
Jyoti Yadav 88 (107); Vineet Sharma 2/40 (9.3 overs)		Pankaj Dharmani 41 (57); Praveen Gupta 4/40 (9.1 overs)

Uttar Pradesh won by 36 runs
Brabourne Stadium, Mumbai
Umpires: Subroto Porel and Sundaram Ravi

- Punjab won the toss and elected to field
- Ravikant Shukla (Uttar Pradesh) made his List A debut.

Quarterfinal 4
10 April 2005
Scorecard

Railways; 214 (48.2 overs)	v	Bengal; 219/3 (46.4 overs)
Shankara Rao 50 (43); Ranadeb Bose 4/33 (10 overs)		Devang Gandhi 98 (117); Shankara Rao 1/32 (6 overs)

Bengal won by 7 wickets
Brabourne Stadium, Mumbai
Umpires: Sankara Dendapani and Vishwas Nerurkar

- Bengal won the toss and elected to field

Quarterfinal 3
10 April 2005
Scorecard

Tamil Nadu; 274/8 (50 overs)	v	Baroda; 244 (46.2 overs)
Subramaniam Badrinath 68 (101); Ajit Bhoite 1/47 (10 overs)		Ajit Bhoite 62 (75); Somasetty Suresh 4/60 (9.2 overs)

Tamil Nadu won by 30 runs
Wankhede Stadium, Mumbai
Umpires: Shashank Ranade and Sukanta Pathak

- Tamil Nadu won the toss and elected to field
- Pinal Shah (Baroda) made his List A debut.

=== Semifinals ===
Semifinal 1
12 April 2005
Scorecard

Tamil Nadu; 277 (50 overs)	v	Bengal; 250 (49.3 overs)
Vidyut Sivaramakrishnan 123 (120); Shib Paul 3/40 (8 overs)		Manoj Tiwary 58 (68); Sridharan Sriram 5/43 (10 overs)

Tamil Nadu won by 27 runs
Brabourne Stadium, Mumbai
Umpires: AY Gokhale and Vishwas Nerurkar

- Tamil Nadu won the toss and elected to bat
- Yo Mahesh made his List A debut

Semifinal 2
12 April 2005
Scorecard

Mumbai; 221/9 (50 overs)	v	Uttar Pradesh; 222/6 (45.5 overs)
M Bangara 46 (50); Suresh Raina 4/33 (10 overs)		Suresh Raina 72 (82); Nilesh Kulkarni 3/33 (8.5 overs)

Uttar Pradesh won by 4 wickets
Wankhede Stadium, Mumbai
Umpires: Sankara Dendapani and Shashank Ranade

- Mumbai won the toss and elected to bat

== Final ==
14 April 2005
Scorecard

Tamil Nadu; 248 (48.4 overs)	v	Uttar Pradesh; 248 (50 overs)
Hemang Badani 69 (89); Jyoti Yadav 3/27 (6.4 overs)		Rohit Prakash Srivastava 57 (76); Ramadoss Naresh 2/39 (7 overs)

Match tied
Wankhede Stadium, Mumbai
Umpires: Anil Chaudhary and Devendra Sharma

- Tamil Nadu won the toss and elected to bat
