= 1996–97 Ranji One Day Trophy =

Indian cricket tournament

- Dates: 21 October – 22 December 1996
- Administrator(s): BCCI
- Cricket format: List A
- Tournament format(s): Round-robin
- Participants: 27
- Matches: 60

The 1996–97 Ranji One Day Trophy was the fourth edition of India's annual List A cricket tournament which became the Vijay Hazare Trophy in 2007. As in the earlier editions, the 1996–97 tournament was open to teams participating in the Ranji Trophy and it was organised on a zonal basis without national playoffs or a final, so the aim of each team was to win its zonal championship only.

== Tournament ==
All 27 teams from the Ranji Trophy competed and were divided into the five zones used for the Duleep Trophy: Central (5 teams), East (5), North (6), South (6), and West (5). The format within each zone was round-robin with the teams playing all of their zonal opponents once. Four points were awarded for a win and run rate was utilised as a tie-breaker within each league. The teams played a total of 60 matches from 21 October to 27 December 1996. The zonal champions were Madhya Pradesh (Central), Assam (East), Delhi (North), Tamil Nadu (South), and Mumbai (West).

=== Central Zone ===
21 October 1996
Scorecard

Railways; 202/6 (50 overs)	v	Madhya Pradesh; 204/6 (49.1 overs)
SZ Zuffri 31; Rajesh Chauhan 3/21 (10 overs)		Chandrakant Pandit 73; Zakir Hussain 3/36 (10 overs)

Madhya Pradesh won by 4 wickets
Karnail Singh Stadium, Delhi
Umpires: Yashpal Sharma and VN Kulkarni

- Madhya Pradesh won the toss and elected to field.
- Points : Madhya Pradesh 4; Railways 0

21 October 1996
Scorecard

Railways; 248/7 (50 overs)	v	Uttar Pradesh; 21/0 (5 overs)
Rizwan Shamshad 60; PK Hedaoo 3/42 (10 overs)		SK Rao 16

No result
Vidarbha Cricket Association Ground, Nagpur
Umpires: SJ Phadkar and BS Bhatti

- Uttar Pradesh won the toss and elected to bat.
- Rain prevented the completion of the second innings.

29 October 1996
Scorecard

Madhya Pradesh; 245/7 (50 overs)	v	Vidarbha; 247/2 (48.3 overs)
Jai Prakash Yadav 92; Lalchand Rajput 2/30 (10 overs)		Lalchand Rajput 83*; Harvinder Sodhi 1/33 (9 overs)

Vidarbha won by 8 wickets
Nehru Stadium, Indore
Umpires: Ramesh Jadhav and K Krishnan

- Madhya Pradesh won the toss and elected to bat.
