= Ajatshatru Singh (cricketer) =

Indian cricketer (born 1992)

Personal information
- Born: 17 September 1992 (age 34); Heswa, Bihar
- Batting: Right-handed
- Bowling: Right-arm medium

Domestic team information
- Years: Team
- 2012-13: Jharkhand cricket team
- Source: ESPNcricinfo, 8 June 2018

Ajatshatru Singh (born 17 September 1992) is an Indian cricketer. He played the different formats of First-class cricket, List A cricket and T20 for the Jharkhand cricket team between 2012 and 2013.
