= Talent Resource Development Wing =

The Talent Resource Development Wing (TRDW, sometimes also called Talent Resource Development Scheme (TRDS)) was an initiative of the Board of Control for Cricket in India (BCCI) to spot local talent, looking beyond the established cricketing centres. The TRDW was established in 2002 with former India national captain Dilip Vengsarkar as its chairman, when Jagmohan Dalmiya was BCCI President. Many successful players of the Indian team, including World Cup winning captain Mahendra Singh Dhoni, Suresh Raina, Irfan Pathan, Sreesanth, RP Singh and Piyush Chawla were first recognised via the TRDW. Prior to this system, the local state cricket associations played the key role in choosing players for that state's team and recommending names to national level selectors. This led to frequent accusations of favouritism and corruption; charges that past players and state selectors would tend to belong to state capitals and urban centres, thus forming a closed club which small town players found it hard to break into. The TRDW was intended to allow talent to be discovered directly by the BCCI, and fast-tracked into being groomed for national team duty via the National Cricket Academy (NCA) and zonal academies. TRDW-selected players have played an important role in the Indian team's performances over the past few years, crowned by the unprecedented success of Mahendra Singh Dhoni as India's captain, and the 2011 Cricket World Cup victory.

== Origins ==
The TRDW's origin was in a similar scheme started in 2001 in Karnataka state by ex- Baroda Cricket Association head Makarand Waingankar, who was then a consultant with the Karnataka State Cricket Association (KSCA). According to Waingankar, within a few months of the scheme beginning in Karnataka, the small district talent was performing competitively with Bangalore (capital of Karnataka) players. The BCCI was impressed with the results; under BCCI President and former International Cricket Council Chairman Jagmohan Dalmiya, it decided to replicate it on a national scale. The TRDW initiative was set up in 2002, and chaired nationally by former India test cricket captain Dilip Vengsarkar, assisted by Brijesh Patel.

== Structure ==
The scheme consisted of 20 Talent Resource Development Officers (TRDOs) who watched local junior matches around the country, rated the players on a uniform objective scale, and reported directly to the National Junior Selection Committee and the National Cricket Academy (NCA). Thus, they bypassed state cricket associations, which often were urban-centric, politicised, and tended to have their own favourites. Since multiple TRDOs assessed the same player on an objective scale, the chances of favouritism or bias were minimised. The TRDW does not exist in its original form now, lapsing in 2006 after a power-shift in the BCCI and the exit of Dalmiya. The NCA has also decided to focus primarily on Under-19 Cricket.

== Discoveries ==
Indian captain Mahendra Singh Dhoni was discovered by TRDO Prakash Poddar, a captain of Bengal in the 1960s, when he saw Dhoni play for Jharkhand at a match in Jamshedpur in 2003, and sent a report to the NCA. Other prominent players discovered via TRDW who have played for the Indian team include left-handed batsman Suresh Raina, Baroda all-rounder Irfan Pathan, right-arm seamer Sreesanth, leg-spinner Piyush Chawla, seamer VRV Singh, and left-arm seamer RP Singh.

== Replication in IPL ==
The Indian Premier League franchise Kolkata Knight Riders (KKR) set up a TRDW in 2009 (the second IPL season) on the lines of BCCI's original model, to spot local talent nationwide. The wing was headed by Makarand Wainganker, the same person who first initiated the concept for the KSCA. However, Wainganker eventually resigned after persistent disagreements with the then KKR coach, John Buchanan, over team selection and Buchanan's "multiple captains" theory.

== See also ==
Makarand Waingankar

Dilip Vengsarkar
