= Pankaj Kumar =

Pankaj Kumar may refer to:

- Pankaj Kumar (cricketer), Indian cricketer
- Pankaj Kumar (cinematographer), Indian cinematographer
