= Dhanraj Singh =

Dhanraj Singh may refer to:

- Dhanraj Singh (politician) (1944–?), Indian politician
- Dhanraj Singh (boxer) (born 1947), Guyanese boxer
- Dhanraj Singh (cricketer) (born 1968), Indian cricketer
- Dhanraj Singh (businessman) (born 2011)
