= D. J. Gokulakrishnan =

Indian cricketer (1973–2023)

Personal information
- Full name: Jayaraman Gokulakrishnan
- Born: 4 January 1973; Madras, Tamil Nadu, India
- Died: 11 October 2023 (aged 50); Chennai, Tamil Nadu, India
- Batting: Right-handed
- Bowling: Right-arm medium
- Role: Bowling all-rounder
- Relatives: Jayaraman Madanagopal (brother)

Domestic team information
- Years: Team
- 1993/94–2003/04: Tamil Nadu
- 1996/97–1997/98: Goa
- 2001/02: Assam

Career statistics
Competition	FC	List A
Matches	39	45
Runs scored	1,116	552
Batting average	24.26	25.09
100s/50s	1/4	0/2
Top score	104*	64*
Balls bowled	6,703	2,170
Wickets	103	71
Bowling average	27.34	20.91
5 wickets in innings	4	1
10 wickets in match	1	n/a
Best bowling	7/54	5/55
Catches/stumpings	33/–	11/–
- Source: ESPNcricinfo, 1 March 2016

Jayaraman Gokulakrishnan (4 January 1973 – 11 October 2023), better known as D. J. Gokulakrishnan, was an Indian first-class cricketer who represented Tamil Nadu, Goa and Assam. In a domestic career spanning 12 years, he scored over 1,000 runs and took over 100 wickets. He also served as a coach, and a match referee post his retirement.

== Biography ==
Gokulakrishnan was born on 4 January 1973 in Madras, present day Chennai, in the southern Indian state of Tamil Nadu.

As a right-arm medium pace bowler who batted right-handed in the lower-middle order, Gokulakrishnan made 39 first-class and 45 List A appearances between the 1993/94 and 2003/04 seasons. He mainly played for his home state Tamil Nadu and South Zone, but also played for Goa for two seasons and Assam for one season. He made 1116 runs at an average of 24.26 and took 103 wickets in his first-class career. He had a successful List A career as well, taking 71 wickets averaging 20.91 per wicket and scoring 552 runs at a 25.09 average. He ended his career with four five-wicket hauls, and scored a hundred and four fifties. During his playing career, he briefly ran into issues with officials regarding his bowling action. He went on to the MRF Pace Foundation and briefly trained under Dennis Lillee to get back to the team.

Gokulakrishnan became a cricket coach after retirement. In 2008, he was made the assistant coach of the Tamil Nadu Ranji team. He was appointed the team's bowling coach in 2010 after Tamil Nadu Cricket Association (TNCA) decided to do away with head and assistant coaches for the senior team. He returned as the team's assistant coach in 2013 before the TNCA made him head coach of the Tamil Nadu under-19 team in 2015. He had also worked as the business development manager of IC Infotech (India Cements Group). He also served as a match referee with the BCCI serving domestic tournaments including Ranji Trophy, Vijay Hazare Trophy, and the Tamil Nadu Premier League.

Gokulakrishnan was also associated with the Chennai Super Kings for five seasons of the Indian Premier League as a talent scout and member of their coaching staff.

Gokulakrishnan's brother J. Madanagopal was also a Tamil Nadu state cricket coach and a talent scout. D. J. Gokulakrishnan died in Chennai on 11 October 2023, at age 50, following a heart attack.
