= Makarand =

Makarand is a given name. People with the name include:

- Makarand Anaspure (born 1973), Indian actor
- Makarand Deshpande (born 1966), Indian actor, writer, and director
- Makarand Dave, Gujarati poet
- Makarand Mane (born 1984), film director
- Makarand Paranjape, Indian novelist
- Makarand Waingankar, ex-cricket administrator and cricket columnist

== See also ==
- Sangit Makarand
