= 2009–10 Vijay Hazare Trophy =

Indian cricket tournament

- Dates: 10 February – 2 March 2010
- Administrator(s): BCCI
- Cricket format: List A cricket
- Tournament format(s): Round-robin and Playoff format
- Host(s): Various
- Champions: Tamil Nadu (4th title)
- Runners-up: Bengal
- Participants: 27
- Matches: 69
- Most runs: Shreevats Goswami (568) (Bengal)
- Most wickets: Yo Mahesh (20) (Tamil Nadu)

The 2009–10 Vijay Hazare Trophy was the 17th edition of the Vijay Hazare Trophy, an annual List A cricket tournament in India. It was contested between 27 domestic cricket teams of India, starting in February and finishing in March 2010. In the final, Tamil Nadu beat Bengal by 29 runs to defend their title. This was their 4th title.

== Final ==
2 March 2010
09:00 AM
Scorecard

Tamil Nadu; 379/6 (50 overs)	v	Bengal; 350/8 (50 overs)
Murali Vijay 103 (102); Soumya Pakre 2/75 (8 overs)		Shreevats Goswami 81 (84); Chandrasekar Ganapathy 3/63 (10 overs)

Tamil Nadu won by 29 runs
Sardar Patel Stadium, Motera, Ahmedabad
Umpires: Amiesh Saheba and Shavir Tarapore

- Tamil Nadu won the toss and elected to bat
