= 2010–11 Vijay Hazare Trophy =

Indian cricket tournament

- Dates: 10 February – 1 March 2011
- Administrator(s): BCCI
- Cricket format: List A cricket
- Tournament format(s): Round-robin and Playoff format
- Host(s): Various
- Champions: Jharkhand (1st title)
- Runners-up: Gujarat
- Participants: 27
- Matches: 69
- Most runs: Ishank Jaggi (346) (Jharkhand)
- Most wickets: Amit Mishra (18) (Haryana)

The 2010–11 Vijay Hazare Trophy was the 18th edition of the Vijay Hazare Trophy, an annual List A cricket tournament in India. It was contested between 27 domestic cricket teams of India, starting in February and finishing in March 2011. In the final, Jharkhand beat Gujarat by 159 runs to win their maiden title.

== Final ==
1 March 2011
14:30 (D/N)
Scorecard

Jharkhand; 255/8 (50 overs)	v	Gujarat; 96 (24 overs)
Ishank Jaggi 58 (86); Salil Yadav 1/28 (9 overs)		Niraj Patel 46 (63); Shahbaz Nadeem 4/6 (4 overs)

Jharkhand won by 159 runs
Holkar Cricket Stadium, Indore
Umpires: Krishna Hariharan and Sudhir Asnani

- Jharkhand won the toss and elected to bat
