= Shikhar Mohan =

Indian cricketer (born 2005)

Personal information
- Full name: Shikhar Suraj Mohan
- Born: 18 May 2005 (age 21); Ranchi, India
- Batting: Left-handed
- Bowling: Slow left-arm orthodox
- Role: Batter

Domestic team information
- Years: Team
- 2025–present: Jharkhand

Career statistics
Competition	FC	LA
Matches	12	11
Runs scored	1109	391
Batting average	61.61	55.85
100s/50s	4/6	2/1
Top score	207	129
Balls bowled	204	27
Wickets	2	0
Bowling average	53.00	–
5 wickets in innings	0	0
10 wickets in match	0	-
Best bowling	2/67	-
Catches/stumpings	14/–	3/–
- Source: Cricinfo, 30 October 2026

Shikhar Suraj Mohan (born 18 May 2005) is an Indian cricketer who plays for Jharkhand. He is a left-handed batsman and left-arm orthodox spin bowler.

== Early life ==
From Doranda, Ranchi, Mohan began playing at Ranchi Cricket Academy at the age of six years-old, having been encouraged to play by his father, who himself had been a bowling all-rounder. He went on to represent his state at Under-16, Under-19 and Under-23 level.

== Career ==
Mohan made his first-class cricket debut for Jharkhand in October 2025. In his debut Ranji Trophy season in 2025-26, Mohan scored a double-century against Nagaland in his third innings and finished the season as Jharkhand's top run-scorer with 613 runs in eight matches at an average of 55.72. He went on to also make his Duleep Trophy, and scored 85 and 52 in his two innings as East Zone won the title and. He also made his Irani Cup debut, where he scored another half-century against Jammu & Kashmir with Rest of India winning the trophy. He began the 2026-27 Ranji Ttrophy season with 143 against Kerala, and 127 against Maharashtra.

Mohan was called-up to the India A cricket team as a replacement for KL Rahul for the final two matches against New Zealand A in October 2026.
