= Prakash Poddar =

Indian cricketer (1940–2022)

Personal information
- Full name: Prakash Chandra Poddar
- Born: 18 October 1940; Calcutta, Bengal Province, British India
- Died: 29 December 2022 (aged 82); Hyderabad, India
- Batting: Right-handed
- Bowling: Leg break googly
- Role: Top-order batsman; occasional wicket-keeper

Domestic team information
- Years: Team
- 1960/61–1976/77: Bengal
- 1964/65–1966/67: Rajasthan

Career statistics
Competition	First-class	List A
Matches	74	1
Runs scored	3,868	28
Batting average	38.29	–
100s/50s	11/18	0/0
Top score	199	28*
Balls bowled	125	–
Wickets	2	–
Bowling average	32.50	–
5 wickets in innings	0	–
10 wickets in match	0	–
Best bowling	1/12	–
Catches/stumpings	38/1	0/–
- Source: ESPNcricinfo, 7 January 2016

Prakash Chandra Poddar (18 October 1940 – 29 December 2022) was an Indian first-class cricketer who played for Bengal cricket team and Rajasthan cricket team. After his playing career, he became a Talent Resource Development Officer (TRDO) for the Board of Control for Cricket in India.

== Career ==
A right-handed top-order batsman, Poddar appeared in 74 first-class matches playing for Bengal, Rajasthan, East Zone, Central Zone. He played unofficial Tests for India and also appeared for Rest of India in Irani Cup and Board President's team in tour games. In January 1964, playing for Board President's XI, Poddar scored 100 not out against a Marylebone Cricket Club bowling attack consisting of John Price, Jeff Jones, Barry Knight, John Mortimore and Donald Wilson. Poddar appeared in two Ranji finals, both during his three-year stint with Rajasthan. He was the third-highest run-getter of the 1970–71 Ranji Trophy scoring 562 runs at an average of 70.25, with a top-score of 199 run out in Bengal's quarterfinal match against Vidarbha. He captained Bengal in a few matches during his career and retired after the 1976/77 season.

After retirement, Poddar worked for the Board of Control for Cricket in India as a Talent Resource Development Officer (TRDO) of the Talent Resource Development Wing. Poddar is credited as the man who "discovered" Mahendra Singh Dhoni during a match in 2003. Poddar wrote his observations about Dhoni, "Good striker of the ball; has a lot of power but needs to work on his wicket-keeping. Technically not very good. Is very good at running between wickets." He recommended Dhoni to the National Cricket Academy, and Dhoni went on to play for India A in 2003/04 and then for the national team. Poddar was TRDO for just one year.
