= Niranjan Godbole =

Indian cricketer (born 1976)

Personal information
- Full name: Niranjan Ajit Godbole
- Born: 26 November 1976 (age 49); Nagpur, Maharashtra
- Batting: Right-handed
- Bowling: Right-arm offbreak
- Role: Top-order batsman

Domestic team information
- Years: Team
- 1995-2004: Maharashtra cricket team

Career statistics
Competition	First-class	List A
Matches	24	23
Runs scored	994	805
Batting average	26.15	36.59
100s/50s	1/5	1/4
Top score	186	143*
Balls bowled	180	222
Wickets	1	5
Bowling average	71.00	27.00
5 wickets in innings	0	0
10 wickets in match	0	0
Best bowling	1/26	2/26
Catches/stumpings	17/–	16/–
- Source: ESPNcricinfo

Niranjan Godbole (born 26 November 1976) is an Indian cricketer. He has played 24 First class and 23 List A matches. He was the top run scorer in the first edition(2002–03) of the Vijay Hazare Trophy.
