= Kunal Singh Rathore =

Indian cricketer (born 2002)

Personal information
- Born: 9 October 2002 (age 24); Kota, Rajasthan, India
- Batting: Left-handed
- Role: Wicket-keeper-batter

Domestic team information
- Years: Team
- 2022–present: Rajasthan
- 2023–present: Rajasthan Royals

Career statistics
Competition	FC	LA	T20
Matches	15	16	13
Runs scored	580	404	254
Batting average	30.52	36.72	31.75
100s/50s	1/2	0/3	0/1
Top score	156	79	61*
Catches/stumpings	49/–	28/–	8/–
- Source: ESPNcricinfo, 5 August 2025

Kunal Singh Rathore (born 9 October 2002) is an Indian cricketer who plays as a left-handed wicketkeeper-batsman. He is from Kota, Rajasthan, he is notably the first player from his hometown to earn a contract in the Indian Premier League (IPL). Rathore represents Rajasthan in domestic cricket and is a member of the Rajasthan Royals squad in the IPL.

== Early life ==
Kunal Singh Rathore was born on 9 October 2002 in Kota, Rajasthan, India. Initially aspiring to become a fast bowler, inspired by S. Sreesanth, he later transitioned to wicketkeeping in order to gain more batting opportunities. He has cited Brad Haddin and Quinton de Kock as key influences on his development as a wicketkeeper-batter.

== Domestic career ==
Rathore made his professional debut for Rajasthan in all three formats First-class, List A, and T20 during the 2022 season. In the 2022–23 Syed Mushtaq Ali Trophy, he scored 147 runs across seven matches at an average of 36.75 and a strike rate of 128.94.

In the 2023–24 Ranji Trophy, Rathore scored 245 runs in six matches at an average of 40.83. His standout performance came against Manipur, where he scored 156 off 138 balls. He also made 19 dismissals behind the stumps. In the same season's Vijay Hazare Trophy, he contributed 250 runs and effected 24 dismissals, playing a crucial role in Rajasthan's progression to the final.

== IPL career ==
In the 2023 IPL auction, Rathore was signed by the Rajasthan Royals for ₹20 lakh, becoming the first cricketer from Kota to secure an IPL contract. He was retained for the 2024 season and later re-signed for ₹30 lakh during the 2025 IPL mega auction.
