= Parag More =

Indian cricketer (born 1985)

Personal information
- Born: 8 June 1985; Pune, India
- Batting: Right-handed
- Bowling: Right-arm off-break
- Role: Batsman/Bowler

Domestic team information
- Years: Team
- 2004–05: Maharashtra
- 2008: Rajasthan Royals

Parag More (born 8 June 1985) is an Indian cricketer. He is a right-handed batsman and right-arm off-break bowler who played for Maharashtra. He was born in Pune.

More has played for Maharashtra at Under-14, Under-16, Under-19, Under-22, and Under-25 level, as well as for West Zone Under 16, Under-19s. He was also the Captain of Under-16, Under-19, Under-22 for Maharashtra. More made a single first-class appearance for Maharashtra during the 2004–05 season, against Tamil Nadu. He was a part of Rajasthan Royals squad in 2008 which won the first Indian Premier League trophy.
