= Naresh Churi =

Indian cricketer and coach (1964–2024)

Personal information
- Full name: Naresh Kamalkar Churi
- Born: 10 May 1964; Bombay, Maharashtra, India
- Died: 30 September 2024 (aged 60); Mumbai, Maharashtra, India
- Batting: Left-handed
- Role: Batsman

Domestic team information
- Years: Team
- 1982/83–1988/89: Railways

Career statistics
Competition	FC	List A
Matches	26	8
Runs scored	1,501	200
Batting average	32.63	28.57
100s/50s	2/7	0/1
Top score	113	99
Balls bowled	174	12
Wickets	1	0
Bowling average	73.00	–
5 wickets in innings	0	0
10 wickets in match	0	n/a
Best bowling	1/34	–
Catches/stumpings	15/–	5/–
- Source: ESPNcricinfo, 26 August 2019

Naresh Kamalkar Churi (10 May 1964 – 30 September 2024) was an Indian cricket coach and first-class cricketer who played for Railways.

== Life and career ==
Churi was born in Bombay (now Mumbai) on 10 May 1964. Cricket coach Ramakant Achrekar, who had five daughters, adopted Churi at the age of 13 so that he could watch matches at the Wankhede Stadium.

Churi made his first-class debut for Railways during the 1982–83 Ranji Trophy and represented the team until the 1988–89 season. A left-handed batsman, Churi scored 1501 runs in 26 first-class matches with two hundreds, including a 112 against Tamil Nadu in the final of the 1987–88 Ranji Trophy which Railways lost by an innings. He would then represent Rest of India in the 1988–89 Irani Cup against the same opposition.

Churi became a cricket coach at Shardashram Vidyamandir in Mumbai, his alma mater, in 1999.

Churi died on 30 September 2024, at the age of 60.
