= Union Territory Cricket Association =

- Sport: Cricket
- Jurisdiction: Chandigarh
- Abbreviation: UTCA
- Founded: 2019
- Affiliation: Board of Control for Cricket in India
- Headquarters: Sector 16 Stadium
- Location: Chandigarh
- (India)

The Union Territory Cricket Association is the governing body of the cricket in the Union Territory of Chandigarh in India and the Chandigarh cricket team. Since August 2019, UTCA got affiliated to the Board of Control for Cricket in India following its merger with the Chandigarh Cricket Association (Punjab). It will be playing its first Ranji Trophy season in 2019–20. In August 2019, BCCI announced that Chandigarh will be featured in the Plate Division of the BCCI domestic season 2019–20. Former Indian cricketer, V. R. V. Singh, was named as the first coach of the team.
