= D. Tamil Kumaran =

Indian cricketer (born 1983)

Personal information
- Full name: Dakshinamoorthy Tamil Kumaran
- Born: 24 November 1983 (age 42); Thanjavur, Tamil Nadu
- Batting: Right-handed
- Bowling: Right-arm medium
- Role: Bowler
- Source: ESPNcricinfo

Dakshinamoorthy Tamil Kumaran (born 24 November 1983) is an Indian first-class cricketer who plays for Tamil Nadu. He took most wickets in the 2006–07 Vijay Hazare Trophy, with a total of 16 dismissals from 7 matches.
