= S. Vasudevan =

Tamil Nadu cricketer (born 1955)

Santhanaraman Vasudevan, usually known as S. Vasudevan (born 12 December 1955 in Madras) is a former Tamil Nadu cricketer. He captained Tamil Nadu to a win in the 1987–88 Ranji Trophy. He took more than two hundred wickets in his first class career.
