= Devraj Patil =

Indian cricketer (born 1984)

Personal information
- Full name: Devraj Thyagaraj Patil
- Born: 6 December 1984 (age 41); Shimoga, Karnataka
- Batting: Right-handed
- Role: Wicket-keeper

Domestic team information
- Years: Team
- 2005/06–2008/09: Karnataka
- 2008: Royal Challengers Bangalore

Career statistics
Competition	FC	LA	T20
Matches	2	14	14
Runs scored	7	286	237
Batting average	7.00	40.85	18.23
100s/50s	0/0	1/1	0/0
Top score	7	106*	44
Catches/stumpings	0/0	17/a	6/3
- Source: ESPNcricinfo, 17 April 2024

Devraj Thyagaraj Patil (born 6 December 1984) is an Indian former first-class cricketer who played for Karnataka and the Royal Challengers Bangalore. He was right-handed wicket-keeper batsman. His only century was scored for Karnataka against Kerala in the group stage of the 2008–09 Vijay Hazare Trophy, his innings of 106 not out could not prevent his side from losing the match. He was born at Shimoga.
