= Sector 16 Stadium =

Cricket stadium in Chandigarh, India

Coordinates: 30°44′29.85″N 76°46′29.12″E

Sector 16 Cricket Stadium
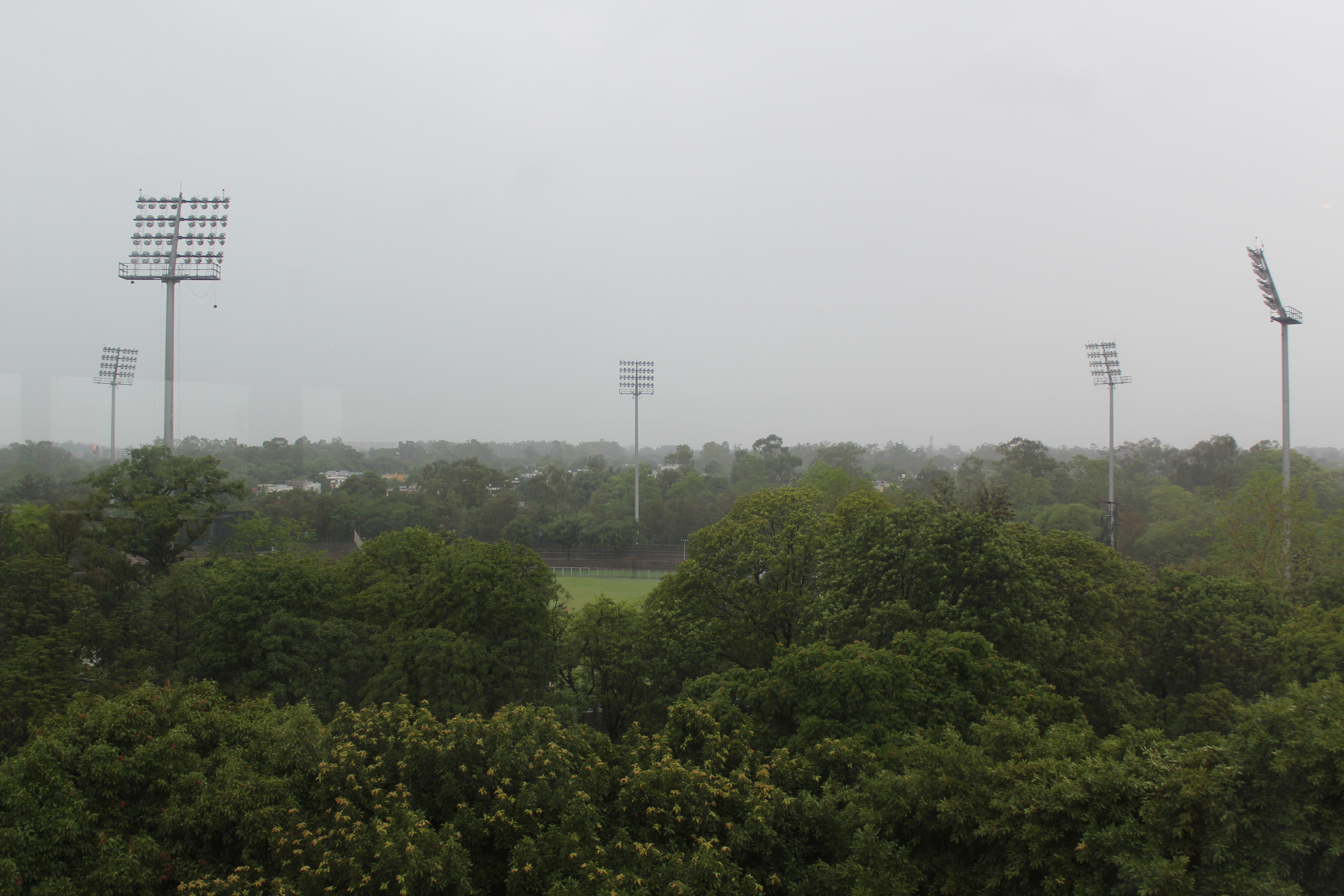
- Interactive map of Sector 16 Cricket Stadium

Ground information
- Location: Chandigarh, India
- Country: India
- Establishment: 1966
- Capacity: 30,000
- Owner: Union Territory Cricket Association
- Operator: Union Territory Cricket Association
- Tenants: CCL Punjab De Sher; Punjab cricket Team
- End names
- n/a

International information
- Only Test: 23 November 1990: India v Sri Lanka
- First ODI: 27 January 1985: India v England
- Last ODI: 8 October 2007: India v Australia
- First WODI: 13 December 1997: New Zealand v Sri Lanka
- Last WODI: 9 December 2001: India v New Zealand
- As of 9 September 2020; Source: Cricinfo

The Sector 16 Stadium is a cricket stadium in Chandigarh, India.

It hosted its first One Day International match in January 1985 and its only Test match in 1990.

It has hosted only four matches. The likes of Kapil Dev, Chetan Sharma and Yograj Singh started playing cricket at the Sector 16 Stadium. It fell out of favour to the nearby Punjab Cricket Association Stadium, (Mohali) cricket ground.

After the stadium in Mohali was built, there was no first-class cricket at the Sector 16 Stadium for 10 years before Haryana ended the barren spell by playing the Ranji Trophy Plate League semi-final in 2004/05. But after 14 years, India and Australia played a match in October 2007. Starting 2025, a new Punjab Cricket Association (PCA) stadium in New Chandigarh has started emerging as a new choice for International matches.

== Records ==
=== Batting in One Day Internationals ===
- Most runs – Navjot Sidhu (India) – 180 runs in two matches, Geoff Marsh- 126 runs and Mathew Hayden- 92 runs.
- Highest score in an innings – Geoff Marsh (Australia) – 126*
- Highest team score- India vs Australia- 291/4 on 8 Oct 2007.

=== Bowling in One Day Internationals ===
- Most wickets – Kapil Dev (India) – 4 wickets in three matches, T Sekhar- 3 wickets and V Raju- 3 wickets
- Best bowling in an innings – Thirumalai Sekhar (India) – 3 wickets for 23 runs

=== Batting in Test ===
- Most runs – Ravi Shastri (India) – 88 Runs in one match
- Highest score in an innings – Ravi Shastri (India) – 88
- Highest team score- India vs Sri Lanka- 288 on 23 Nov 1990.

=== Bowling in Test ===
- Most wickets – Venkatapathy Raju (India) – 8 wickets in one match
- Best bowling in an innings – Venkatapathy Raju (India) – 6 wickets for 12 runs

== List of Centuries ==
=== Key ===
- *(asterisk) denotes that the batsman was not out.
- Inns. denotes the number of the innings in the match.
- Balls denotes the number of balls faced in an innings.
- NR denotes that the number of balls was not recorded.
- Parentheses next to the player's score denotes his century number at Edgbaston.
- The column title Date refers to the date the match started.
- The column title Result refers to the player's team result

=== One Day Internationals ===
No.	Score	Player	Team	Balls	Inns.	Opposing team	Date	Result
1	126*	Geoff Marsh	Australia	149	1	New Zealand	27 October 1987	Won
2	104*	Navjot Singh Sidhu	India	109	2	Bangladesh	25 December 1990	Won

== List of Five Wicket Hauls ==
=== Key ===
Symbol	Meaning
†	The bowler was man of the match
‡	10 or more wickets taken in the match
§	One of two five-wicket hauls by the bowler in the match
Date	Day the Test started or ODI was held
Inn	Innings in which five-wicket haul was taken
Overs	Number of overs bowled.
Runs	Number of runs conceded
Wkts	Number of wickets taken
Econ	Runs conceded per over
Batsmen	Batsmen whose wickets were taken
Drawn	The match was drawn.

=== Tests ===
No.	Bowler	Date	Team	Opposing team	Inn	Overs	Runs	Wkts	Econ	Batsmen	Result
1	Venkatapathy Raju	23 November 1990	India	Sri Lanka	2	17.5	12	6	0.67	Aravinda de Silva; Arjuna Ranatunga; Hashan Tillakaratne; Marvan Attapatu; Rumesh Ratnayake; Jayananda Warnaweera	Won

== See also ==
- List of Test cricket grounds
- One-Test wonder
- Punjab Cricket Association Stadium
- Mullanpur International Cricket Stadium
