= Balkrishna Jadeja =

Indian cricketer (born 1987)

Personal information
- Full name: Balkrishna Jadeja
- Born: 25 October 1987 (age 39); Jamkhambhaliya, Gujarat, India
- Source: ESPNcricinfo, 4 January 2019

Balkrishna Jadeja (born 25 October 1987) is an Indian cricketer. He has played 12 First class, 10 List A and 4 Twenty20 matches.
