= Dhanraj Singh (cricketer) =

Indian cricketer

Personal information
- Born: 1 June 1968 (age 58); Faridabad, Haryana
- Batting: Right-handed
- Bowling: Right-arm medium
- Role: All-rounder

Domestic team information
- Years: Team
- 1990/91–1998/99: Haryana cricket team

Career statistics
Competition	First-class	List A
Matches	51	32
Runs scored	1,379	438
Batting average	19.98	20.85
100s/50s	0/5	0/4
Top score	86	66*
Balls bowled	4,331	1,576
Wickets	71	50
Bowling average	27.94	19.88
5 wickets in innings	0	0
10 wickets in match	0	0
Best bowling	4/19	6/19
Catches/stumpings	33/–	8/–
- Source: ESPNcricinfo

Dhanraj Singh is an Indian former cricketer. He played 51 First class and 32 List A matches. He was the top wicket-taker in the first edition (1993–94) of the Vijay Hazare Trophy representing Haryana cricket team.
