= Vinayak Mane =

Indian cricketer (born 1982)

Personal information
- Born: 6 October 1982 (age 42)
- Batting: Right-handed

Vinayak Ramesh Mane (born 10 June 1982 in Bombay, Maharashtra) is an Indian cricketer who plays for Mumbai. A right-handed opening batsman, he has previously represented India 'A'.

== Career ==
=== India A ===
Mane came from the school of Ramakant Achrekar who is regarded as being the guru of Sachin Tendulkar. He was a successful junior cricketer having played for India at Under-19 level. In a match against the English Colts in Chepauk he scored a double century after his side had followed on.

=== Mumbai ===
He represented Mumbai for 7 seasons as an Opening Batsman. He played 57 Firstclass, 33 List A and 7 T20 games in his Firstclass Career. He Captained Jammu and Kashmir in his last year of Firstclass Cricket where he played 3 Ranji Trophy games and 5 T20 games. He was part of 3 Ranji Championships and 2 Oneday Championships for Mumbai during his career. He also represented for Board President Xl, Rest of India, West Zone in Duleep and Deodhar Trophy, India Under-19. His career came to an abrupt end due to a forearm injury which he suffered in 2002 during a fielding session at Shivaji Park in Mumbai. The forearm fracture required an immediate surgery in which 2 metal plates and 14 screws were used to treat the fracture. He played 2 years with the metal plates and screws in his hand but during the season 2004-05 the metal damaged one of the tissue in his forearm due to which there was pain and lack of strength in his forearm. Further 2 surgeries were performed but his forearm never recovered and his career went in to a downhill and subsequently came to an early end. He took up Coaching 7 years back to follow his dream and passion in the game and be associated with it always. He has Coached Mumbai Under-23 and Under-16 Teams. He is currently the Head Coach of Parsee Gymkhana Cricket Club which is a top division Team in Mumbai's club Cricket.

=== Sefton Park Cricket Club ===
Mane joined Sefton Park Cricket Club in the Liverpool and District Cricket Competition in 2003, scoring 711 league runs at 47.4 and returned in 2004 to score 782 league runs at 46.0. Mane was due to play for Sefton again in 2005 but could not travel due to a hip operation.
