= Jayesh Odedra =

Indian cricketer (born 1987)

Personal information
- Born: 20 October 1987 (age 39)
- Source: ESPNcricinfo, 8 February 2018

Jayesh Odedra (born 20 October 1987) is an Indian cricketer who played first-class matches for Saurashtra.
