= M. Venkataramana =

Indian cricketer

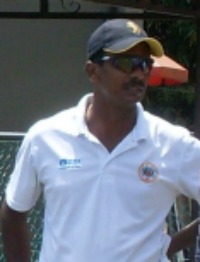

Cricket information
- Batting: Right-handed
- Bowling: Right-arm off-break

International information
- National side: India
- Only Test (cap 185): 28 April 1989 v West Indies
- Only ODI (cap 70): 17 December 1988 v New Zealand

Career statistics
Competition	Tests	ODIs
Matches	1	1
Runs scored	0	0
Batting average	–	–
100s/50s	0/0	0/0
Top score	0*	0*
Balls bowled	70	60
Wickets	1	2
Bowling average	58.00	18.00
5 wickets in innings	0	0
10 wickets in match	0	0
Best bowling	1/10	2/36
Catches/stumpings	1/–	0/–
- Source: ESPNcricinfo, 10 September 2005

Margashayam Venkataramana (born 24 April 1966) is a former Indian cricketer. He was a right arm off-spinner, who played for Tamil Nadu in first class cricket. He made his debut in the 1987–88 Ranji Trophy season and took 35 wickets including a career best 7 for 94 in the final against Railways. Another 30 wickets in 1988–89 season earned him a place in the Indian one-day squad against the touring New Zealand national cricket team. He played his only match at Vadodara and picked up 2 wickets. Venkataramana's only test match was against West Indies cricket team at Jamaica in 1988–89. He went wicket-less in the first innings and dismissed Desmond Haynes for his only Test wicket. Venkataramana first player in the world to get his first wicket as stumping in both Test and ODI.

He took 247 wickets in his first-class career, 212 of them for Tamil Nadu. After his retirement in 2000, he took up coaching. He served as the head coach of Singapore Cricket Association till 2011. He works as a specialist spin bowling coach in the BCCI academy in Chennai and coaches Dindigul Dragons in the Tamil Nadu Premier League. He is part of the Coaching faculty in National Cricket Academy in Bengalure where he works with upcoming young India spin bowlers.
