= Chirag Pathak =

Indian cricketer (born 1987)

Personal information
- Born: 2 February 1987 (age 39); Keshod, Gujarat, India
- Source: ESPNcricinfo, 18 October 2015

Chirag Pathak (born 2 February 1987) is an Indian first-class cricketer who plays for Saurashtra.
