= B. Jamula =

Indian cricket umpire (born 1953)

Bomi Jamula
Personal information
- Born: 26 July 1953 (age 73); Mumbai, India

Umpiring information
- ODIs umpired: 5 (1990–1999)
- WODIs umpired: 3 (1997–2003)
- Source: ESPNcricinfo, 20 May 2014

Bomi Ardeshir Jamula (born 26 July 1953) is a former Indian cricket umpire. At the international level, he has only officiated in five One Day Internationals, between 1990 and 1999.

== See also ==
- List of One Day International cricket umpires
