= V. R. V. Singh =

Indian cricketer

V.R.V. Singh
Personal information
- Full name: Vikram Raj Vir Singh
- Born: 17 September 1984 (age 42); Chandigarh, India
- Batting: Right-handed
- Bowling: Right-arm fast-medium

International information
- National side: India (2006–2007)
- Test debut: 2 June 2006 v West Indies
- Last Test: 18 May 2007 v Bangladesh
- ODI debut (cap 127): 12 April 2006 v England
- Last ODI: 15 April 2006 v England

Domestic team information
- Years: Team
- 2004–2014: Punjab
- 2008–2010: Kings XI Punjab

Career statistics
Competition	Test	ODI	FC	LA
Matches	5	2	29	37
Runs scored	47	8	440	126
Batting average	11.75	8.00	16.29	18.00
100s/50s	0/0	0/0	0/0	0/0
Top score	29	8	47	30*
Balls bowled	669	72	4,865	1,757
Wickets	8	0	121	55
Bowling average	53.37	–	24.81	27.87
5 wickets in innings	0	0	10	1
10 wickets in match	–	–	2	–
Best bowling	3/48	–	7/75	5/38
Catches/stumpings	1/–	3/–	6/–	7/–
- Source: ESPNcricinfo, 7 January 2018

Vikram Raj Vir Singh (born 17 September 1984), commonly known as VRV Singh, is a former Indian cricketer who was a member of the India national cricket team. He is a right-arm fast-medium bowler. He is considered one of the few genuine fast bowlers India has produced over the last decade. However, he was only selected for seven international matches, two Tests and five One Day Internationals. After being called into the Indian squad to play Sri Lanka in 2005, he failed a fitness test and was promptly dropped. He finally played his first ODI against England at Jamshedpur. He debuted in Tests against the West Indies in June 2006. In March 2019, he announced his retirement from cricket. In August 2019, BCCI formed a separate cricket association for Chandigarh and named it Union Territory Cricket Association. VRV Singh was named as the coach of the team.

== Early life ==
Singh was born in Chandigarh, India. He has always been a fast bowler and compromised his accuracy for extra pace. He debuted for the Punjab in 2003/04 Ranji Trophy season and continues to play first class cricket for Punjab. According to the former coach of Punjab, Bhupinder Singh Senior, "All he wants to do is bowl fast, nothing else matters to him". He played for India in the Under-19 Cricket World Cup in 2004 but disappointed with the ball, going for an expensive 44 runs in five overs in his only match. He later received the Border-Gavaskar scholarship which allowed him to train in cricket academies in Australia. His fellow scholarship holder, R. P. Singh, also later went on to play for India.

== Domestic career ==
Singh began his domestic career with the Punjab cricket team in the Limited Overs version of the Ranji Trophy. He played only one match and went wicketless. However, when he made his debut for Punjab in the first class version of the Trophy, he averaged 21.00 over his 6 matches and took 30 wickets. However, he was still unimpressive in ODIs, averaging 109.00 over 4 matches. Despite this, he was selected for the Indian ODI squad against Sri Lanka after playing only 5 ODIs for his state, but was sent back to the domestic circuit after failing a fitness test. He improved his performance in the 2005–06 ODI Ranji Trophy season, averaging 20.75 over his 4 matches, which included a 4 wicket haul.

Singh impressed many in the Challenger Trophy with his pace, which was the quickest of the tournament. He played for India A and while he picked up few wickets, he was referred to as the "fastest bowler in India" by VVS Laxman and "the quickest around at present" by Javagal Srinath. He also impressed West Indian pace bowling great Ian Bishop, who believed he was improving with every game and developing into a good fast bowling prospect for India.

== International career ==
Singh was selected to play against England as part of the Indian Board President's XI team in the England's tour of India in the 2006 season, and made his ODI debut for India later in the series. He then played England again at Indore in the same series. He has since been left out of the ODI team due to the presence of Munaf Patel and Irfan Pathan. He did not get any wickets during his two one-day matches.

He made his Test debut against the West Indies in West Indies, taking two wickets. He has also played two tests against South Africa, in which he has achieved 2 more wickets.

== Injury and comeback ==
Injuries took a toll on VRV Singh's body and he could not play a domestic match for Punjab from 2008 to 2012, although he played few IPL matches for Kings XI Punjab. He had to go through the complete process from Nets to Clubs to State team again. He made his T20 comeback vs Assam in March 2012. He played five T20s and disappeared again. One and a half years later, he made his First-Class comeback after five years vs Haryana in November 2013 and took a 5-wicket haul in 1st Innings.

== Coaching career ==
In August 2019, BCCI formed a separate cricket association for Chandigarh and named it Union Territory Cricket Association. VRV Singh was named as the coach of the team.
