= Telco Club Ground =

Stadium in Jamshedpur, Jharkhand, India

Tata Engineering and Locomotive Company Club Ground
- Telco Club Ground
- Interactive map of Tata Engineering and Locomotive Company Club Ground
- Full name: Tata Engineering and Locomotive Company Club Ground
- Location: Jamshedpur, Jharkhand
- Coordinates: 22.7719°N 86.2448°E
- Owner: TATA Engineering and Locomotive Company
- Operator: TATA Engineering and Locomotive Company
- Capacity: 3,000

Construction
- Groundbreaking: 1991
- Opened: 1991

Website
- Cricinfo

Tata Engineering and Locomotive Company Club Ground or Telco Club Ground is a multi purpose stadium in Jamshedpur, Jharkhand. The ground is mainly used for organizing matches of football, cricket and other sports. The stadium has hosted nine List A matches 2004 when Assam cricket team played against Orissa cricket team but since then the stadium has hosted non-first-class matches.
