= Rohan Banerjee =

Indian cricketer (born 1988)

Personal information
- Full name: Rohan Bijesh Banerjee
- Born: 10 December 1988 (age 37); Bijpur, West Bengal, India
- Height: 5 ft 8 in (1.73 m)
- Source: Cricinfo

Rohan Bijesh Banerjee (born 10 December 1988) is an Indian cricketer. He played for Bengal and Kolkata Knight Riders in Indian Premier League 2008. He is an opening batsman.

On his first-class debut for Bengal against Services he scored 176.
