= Narender Singh (Delhi cricketer) =

Indian cricketer (born 1987)

Personal information
- Born: 17 September 1987 (age 39); Delhi, India
- Source: ESPNcricinfo, 10 April 2016

Narender Singh (born 17 September 1987) is an Indian former cricketer. He played four first-class matches for Delhi in 2007.

== See also ==
- List of Delhi cricketers
