= 2008–09 Vijay Hazare Trophy =

Indian cricket tournament

- Dates: 15 February – 9 March 2009
- Administrator(s): BCCI
- Cricket format: List A cricket
- Tournament format(s): Round-robin and Playoff format
- Host(s): Various
- Champions: Tamil Nadu (3rd title)
- Runners-up: Bengal
- Participants: 27
- Matches: 69
- Most runs: Virat Kohli (534) (Delhi)
- Most wickets: Shoaib Ahmed (21) (Hyderabad)

The 2008–09 Vijay Hazare Trophy was the 16th edition of the Vijay Hazare Trophy, an annual List A cricket tournament in India. It was contested between 27 domestic cricket teams of India, starting in February and finishing in March 2009. In the final, Tamil Nadu beat Bengal by 66 runs to defend win their 3rd title.

== Final ==
9 March 2009
08:30 AM
Scorecard

Tamil Nadu; 284/6 (50 overs)	v	Bengal; 218 (45.2 overs)
Abhinav Mukund 118 (140); Ashok Dinda 3/52 (10 overs)		Manoj Tiwary 76 (87); Ravichandran Ashwin 3/25 (9.2 overs)

Tamil Nadu won by 66 runs
Maharaja Bir Bikram College Stadium, Agartala
Umpires: Amiesh Saheba and Sanjay Hazare

- Tamil Nadu won the toss and elected to bat
