= Pankaj Kumar (cricketer) =

Indian cricketer (born 1999)

Personal information
- Full name: Pankaj Kishor Kumar
- Born: 12 November 1999 (age 27); Jehanabad, Bihar, India
- Source: Cricinfo, 17 December 2019

Pankaj Kumar (born 12 November 1999) is an Indian cricketer. He made his first-class debut on 17 December 2019, for Jharkhand in the 2019–20 Ranji Trophy. He made his Twenty20 debut on 12 January 2021, for Jharkhand in the 2020–21 Syed Mushtaq Ali Trophy.
