= Kshemal Waingankar =

Indian cricketer (born 1985)

Personal information
- Full name: Kshemal Makarand Waingankar
- Born: 5 April 1985; Andheri, India
- Batting: Right-handed
- Bowling: Right-arm medium-fast
- Relatives: Makarand Waingankar (father)
- Source: ESPNcricinfo, 25 November 2016

Kshemal Waingankar (born 5 April 1985) is an Indian first-class cricketer who plays for Mumbai. He made his first-class debut for Mumbai in the 2006-07 Ranji Trophy on 17 December 2006.
