= 2005–06 Ranji One Day Trophy =

Indian cricket tournament

- Dates: 10 February – 5 April 2006
- Administrator(s): BCCI
- Cricket format: List A cricket
- Tournament format(s): Round-robin and Playoff format
- Host(s): Various
- Champions: Railways (1st title)
- Runners-up: Uttar Pradesh
- Participants: 27
- Matches: 69
- Most runs: Dinesh Mongia (520) (Punjab)
- Most wickets: Sankalp Vohra (16) (Baroda)

The 2005–06 Ranji One Day Trophy was the 13th edition of India's annual List A cricket tournament, which became the Vijay Hazare Trophy in 2007. It was contested between 27 domestic cricket teams of India, starting in February and finishing in April 2006. In the final, Railways beat Uttar Pradesh by 20 runs to win their maiden title.

== Final ==
5 April 2006
Scorecard

| Railways; 224 (47.3 overs) | v | Uttar Pradesh; 204 (47.1 overs) |
| Shreyas Khanolkar 73 (92); Praveen Kumar 5/32 (9 overs) | | Ravikant Shukla 44 (51); Shreyas Khanolkar 3/46 (10 overs) |

Railways won by 20 runs
Wankhede Stadium, Mumbai
Umpires: Rajan Seth and H. S. Sekhon

- Railways won the toss and elected to bat
