= Sankalp Vohra =

Indian cricketer (born 1983)

Personal information
- Full name: Sankalp Vohra
- Born: 24 August 1983 (age 43); Ahmedabad, Gujarat, India
- Source: ESPNcricinfo, 6 January 2019

Sankalp Vohra (born 24 August 1983) is an Indian cricketer. He has played 13 First class, 20 List A and 4 Twenty20 matches. He took most wickets in the 2005–06 Vijay Hazare Trophy, India's domestic 50 over tournament.
