= S. Ravindhron =

Indian cricket umpire (born 1952)

Personal information
- Born: 9 November 1952 (age 74)

Umpiring information
- ODIs umpired: 1 (1986)
- Source: Cricinfo, 28 May 2014

S. Ravindhron (born 9 November 1952) is a former Indian cricket umpire. In his international umpiring career, he has only stood in one ODI game, in 1986.

== See also ==
- List of One Day International cricket umpires
