= Makarand Waingankar =

Makarand Waingankar is an ex-cricket administrator and cricket columnist based in Mumbai, India. He was the CEO of the Baroda Cricket Association and served in various positions with other BCCI organs. As consultant to the Karnataka State Cricket Association in 2001, he set up a Talent Resource Development Wing (TRDW) to spot talent in rural districts in Karnataka, away from the established urban centre of Bangalore. This initiative was successful, and was replicated nationwide by the BCCI in 2002, when Jagmohan Dalmiya was president. The TRDW Chairman was ex-India test captain Dilip Vengsarkar, assisted by Brijesh Patel. The TRDW helped discover many successful players, including present India captain Mahendra Singh Dhoni, Suresh Raina, Irfan Pathan, RP Singh, VRV Singh, and others.

Waingankar was contracted to set up a TRDW for the Indian Premier League franchise Kolkata Knight Riders (KKR) in 2009, the second IPL season, to spot talent nationwide. However, after doing the initial groundwork, he resigned from his position due to strong disagreements with the controversial then KKR coach, John Buchanan, over team selection and John's "multiple captains" theory.

Waingankar also worked closely with Dilip Vengsarkar and helped establish the Elf-Vengsarkar Cricket Academy in Mumbai. In the late 80s, Bombay's Ranji Trophy team was very strong in batting, but lacked in the bowling department. To counter this, Waingankar played a pivotal role in setting up the BCA-Mafatlal Bowling Scheme in 1990, in which budding bowlers were trained by renowned English fast bowler Frank Tyson. Abey Kuruvilla, Paras Mhambrey, Sairaj Bahutule, Salil Ankola and Nilesh Kulkarni are some of the bowlers who emerged from the academy, many of whom became regular India players through the 1990s.

== See also ==
Talent Resource Development Wing (TRDW)
