= Vishal Bhatia =

Indian cricketer (born 1981)

Personal information
- Born: 6 December 1981 (age 44); Hamirpur, Himachal Pradesh, India
- Source: Cricinfo, 23 October 2015

Vishal Bhatia (born 6 December 1981) is an Indian first-class cricketer who plays for Himachal Pradesh.
