= Viraj Kadbe =

Indian cricketer (born 1989)

Personal information
- Full name: Viraj Vilas Kadbe
- Born: 18 November 1989 (age 36); Nagpur, Maharashtra, India
- Batting: Right-handed
- Bowling: Legbreak

Domestic team information
- Years: Team
- 2007/08–2008/09: Vidarbha

Career statistics
Competition	List A
Matches	6
Runs scored	80
Batting average	26.66
100s/50s	0/0
Top score	32
Balls bowled	258
Wickets	7
Bowling average	27.42
5 wickets in innings	0
10 wickets in match	–
Best bowling	2/28
Catches/stumpings	3/–
- Source: ESPNcricinfo, 20 March 2025

Viraj Vilas Kadbe (born 19 November 1989 in Nagpur) is an Indian former cricketer who played for Vidharba in domestic cricket. He made his List A debut against Rajasthan in March 2008. He was signed by Chennai Super Kings for the inaugural season of the Indian Premier League but failed to make an appearance for the team.
