= Iresh Saxena =

Indian cricketer (born 1984)

Personal information
- Born: 14 March 1984 (age 41); Faridabad, Haryana, India
- Batting: Right-handed
- Bowling: Slow left arm orthodox
- Role: Bowler

Domestic team information
- Years: Team
- 2007/08–2014/15: Bengal

Iresh Saxena (born 14 March 1984) is an Indian former cricketer who played for Bengal. He made his first-class debut against Madhya Pradesh at Gwalior, 10–13 November 2008. He was signed by Kolkata Knight Riders for the Indian Premier League.
