= Yo Mahesh =

Indian cricketer (born 1987)

Personal information
- Full name: Vijaykumar Yo Mahesh
- Born: 21 December 1987 (age 38); Chennai, India
- Batting: Right-handed
- Bowling: Right-arm medium-fast
- Role: All-rounder

Domestic team information
- Years: Team
- 2008–2010: Delhi Daredevils
- 2011–2012: Chennai Super Kings
- Tamil Nadu
- 2021: Northern Warriors-Abu Dhabi T10 League

Career statistics
| Competition | FC | LA | T20 |
|---|---|---|---|
| Matches | 50 | 61 | 46 |
| Runs scored | 1119 | 326 | 96 |
| Batting average | 26.02 | 13.04 | 9.60 |
| 100s/50s | 2/5 | 0/1 | 0/0 |
| Top score | 103* | 55 | 17* |
| Balls bowled | 7132 | 1665 | 929 |
| Wickets | 108 | 93 | 52 |
| Bowling average | 35.31 | 24.67 | 23.00 |
| 5 wickets in innings | 3 | 2 | 0 |
| 10 wickets in match | 0 | 0 | 0 |
| Best bowling | 6/47 | 5/31 | 4/23 |
| Catches/stumpings | 23/0 | 18/0 | 13/0 |
- Source: ESPNcricinfo, 20 December 2020

Vijaykumar Yo Mahesh (born 21 December 1987), is a former Indian cricketer who played for Tamil Nadu. He is a right-hand batsman and bowls with his right hand. He studied at St. Bede's Anglo Indian Higher Secondary School in Chennai.

He broke into the Indian U19 one-day squad for the series against Australia in September 2005 and played sufficiently well to retain his squad place for both the Afro-Asian Cup and the 2006 Under-19 Cricket World Cup in Sri Lanka.

In his ten U19 ODIs to date, he has taken 15 wickets with a strike rate of one wicket every 32 balls. Previously, from 2008 to 2010, he played for Delhi Daredevils in the IPL. He was then signed up by the Chennai Super Kings in 2011 and released after the end of IPL 2012. He took most wickets in the 2009–10 Vijay Hazare Trophy, India's domestic 50 over tournament. He can swing the ball both ways.

On 20 December 2020, Mahesh announced his retirement from all forms of cricket.
