= Ranadeb Bose =

Indian cricketer (born 1979)

Personal information
- Full name: Ranadeb Ranjit Bose
- Born: February 27, 1979 (age 47); Kolkata, West Bengal, India
- Batting: Right-handed
- Bowling: Right-arm fast-medium
- Role: Bowler

Domestic team information
- Years: Team
- Bengal
- 2009: Kings XI Punjab
- Source: Cricinfo, 15 January 2021

Ranadeb Ranjit Bose (Bengali: রণদেব বোস) (born 27 February 1979, Kolkata, India) is an Indian former first-class cricketer who played for Bengal. A right-arm fast-medium bowler, he took 8 wickets in the Ranji Trophy final of 2006/07 against Mumbai. Bose finished the season with 57 wickets at an average of 14.23. He was the joint highest wicket-taker in the 2004–05 Vijay Hazare Trophy, India's domestic 50 over tournament.

Ranadeb attended St. Lawrence High School in Kolkata and graduated in commerce from St Xavier's College of the University of Calcutta.

Owing to his performance in the domestic season in 2006-07 he was awarded 'Ceat domestic cricketer of the year' in a ceremony held in Mumbai on 6 February 2007.

On 27 September 2007 Bose was named in the 'D' category of Indian cricketers, which means he officially gets Rs 15 Lakh annually and is also on the official list of the national team.
