= Devang Gandhi =

Indian cricket player

Personal information
- Born: 6 September 1971 (age 55); Bhavnagar, Gujarat, India
- Batting: Right-handed
- Bowling: Right-arm medium

Career statistics
Competition	Test	ODI
Matches	4	3
Runs scored	204	49
Batting average	34.00	16.33
100s/50s	0/2	0/0
Top score	88	30
Catches/stumpings	3/–	0/–
- Source: ESPNcricinfo, 18 November 2022

Devang Jayant Gandhi (born 6 September 1971) is a former Indian cricketer. He was a right-handed opening batsman and a very occasional right-arm medium-pace bowler. He played for Bengal, Hadleigh and Thundersley Cricket Club, Essex.

Despite the 1999–2000 tour of Australia exposing Gandhi's weakness in technique against faster deliveries, his domestic form stayed constant, having had a good start to his international career in India. Successive stands with Sadagoppan Ramesh in New Zealand lifted Gandhi's Test average above 50. Poor performances saw him dropped during the Australian tour. Gandhi played domestic cricket for Bengal in the Ranji Trophy and East Zone in the Duleep Trophy before retiring after the 2005–06 season. Gandhi also had two seasons playing for Gwersyllt Park CC, who play in the North Wales cricket league. He was appointed as a national selector for Indian cricket team. A former Indian opening batsman, Devang Gandhi, featured for India in 4 Tests and 3 ODIs. Despite showing a lot of promise at the beginning of his international career, Gandhi's inability to handle short-pitched bowling meant that his days as an Indian opener were limited.

He made his international debut in the first Test against New Zealand in Mohali in 1999. Even though he got out for a duck in the first innings, he cemented his place in the team by scoring 75 in the second essay and put on 137 runs for the opening wicket with Sadagoppan Ramesh. His good form continued in the second Test as well. He was the top scorer for India in the game, making 88 and 31 not out as India won the game by 8 wickets.

With India winning the series 1-0 and his average being close to 50 after three Tests, many started believing that Gandhi was destined to be a formidable opener. With the success he found during the New Zealand series, he was selected for India's tour of Australia in 1999–00. However, the tour Down Under turned out to be a disastrous affair for Gandhi.

His poor technique against the short ball got highlighted during the first Test match in Adelaide. It was not just his scores of 4 and 0, but how he never looked comfortable against the rising ball and Glenn McGrath exploited his weakness to put India under pressure right from the beginning.

Gandhi played two ODIs against Australia during the tri-series that followed the Tests. He registered scores of 6 and 13 in those two games and never played for India again. He played 95 first-class matches during his career, collecting 6111 runs at an average of 42.73. He retired in April 2006.
