= Jharkhand cricket team =

Indian cricket team

Personnel
- Captain: Ishan Kishan
- Coach: Shiv Shankar Rao
- Owner: Jharkhand Cricket Association

Team information
- Founded: 2004
- Home ground: JSCA International Stadium Complex, Ranchi
- Capacity: 50,000

History
- First-class debut: Saurashtra in 2004 at Madhavrao Scindia Cricket Ground, Rajkot
- Ranji Trophy wins: 0
- Irani Cup wins: 0
- Vijay Hazare Trophy wins: 1 (2010-11)
- Syed Mushtaq Ali Trophy wins: 1 (2025)
- Official website: Jharkhand State Cricket Association

The Jharkhand cricket team is a first-class cricket team based in the Indian state of Jharkhand. When the old state of Bihar was split into Jharkhand state and Bihar state, the Jharkhand team took the place of the Bihar cricket team, as much of the former's state's cricketing infrastructure was in Jharkhand.

== History ==
Jharkhand State Cricket Association was formed on November 15, 2000, and the team made its first-class debut in November 2004 against Saurashtra in the 2004/05 Ranji Trophy at Madhavrao Scindia Cricket Ground, Rajkot. The match was drawn.

The team won the 2010/11 Vijay Harare Trophy against Gujarat at the Holkar Cricket Stadium in Indore. Jharkhand batted first and were boosted by several useful contributions from their batsmen while Gujarat in their reply failed to measure up against a dominating bowling performance to sink to a 159-run defeat.

In 2021, Jharkhand have scored 422 runs losing 9 wickets in the first innings. It is the highest ever total in 50 over domestic cricket in India. In March 2022, in the preliminary quarter-final match against Nagaland in the 2021–22 Ranji Trophy, Jharkhand made their highest team total in a first-class cricket match with 880, the fourth-highest team total in the Ranji Trophy.

== Honours ==
- Vijay Hazare Trophy
  - Winners: 2010-11
- Syed Mushtaq Ali Trophy
  - Winners: 2025-26

== Home grounds ==
Jawaharlal Nehru Stadium	Dhanbad	Jharkhand	2006		
Railway Stadium	Dhanbad	Jharkhand	2009		
Nehru Stadium	Giridih	Jharkhand	1989	1989	
Hazaribagh Stadium	Hazaribagh	Jharkhand	1988	1988	
Tata Digwadih Stadium	Jamadoba	Jharkhand	1969		
Keenan Stadium	Jamshedpur	Jharkhand	1939	2008	Hosted ten ODIs.
Telco Club Ground	Jamshedpur	Jharkhand	2004	2004	
Birsa Stadium	Ranchi	Jharkhand	1993	1999	
JSCA International Stadium Complex	Ranchi	Jharkhand	2010		Hosted 4 ODIs,1 T20I & 1 Test.
Metallurgical & Engineering Consultant Ltd Sail Stadium	Ranchi	Jharkhand	1984		

== Notable players ==
Players from Jharkhand who have played Test cricket for India, along with year of Test debut:

- Mahendra Singh Dhoni (2005)
- Varun Aaron (2011)
- Shahbaz Nadeem (2019)
- Ishan Kishan (2023)

Players from Jharkhand who have played ODI but not Test cricket for India, along with year of ODI debut :

- Saurabh Tiwary (2010)

India Capped player from other state who played for Jharkhand, along with year:

- Vijay Bharadwaj (2005)

Notable players at the domestic level:

- Mihir Diwakar (2004-2009)
- Shankar Rao (2004-2013)
- Ishank Jaggi (2007-2021)
- Rahul Shukla (2009-2024)
- Kumar Deobrat (2011-2024)
- Virat Singh (2014-present)
- Anukul Roy (2018-present)

== Current squad ==
Players with international caps are listed in bold.

Name	Birth date	Batting style	Bowling style	Notes
Batsmen
Virat Singh	8 December 1997 (age 28)	Left-handed	Right-arm leg break	
Shikhar Mohan	18 May 2005 (age 21)	Left-handed	Slow left-arm orthodox	
Sharandeep Singh	27 November 2002 (age 23)	Right-handed	Right-arm medium	
Md Kounain Quraishi	29 September 2002 (age 24)	Right-handed	Right-arm off break	
Aryaman Sen	15 January 2000 (age 26)	Right-handed	Slow left-arm orthodox	
All-Rounders
Sahil Raj	7 September 2003 (age 23)	Right-handed	Right-arm medium	
Utkarsh Singh	7 May 1998 (age 28)	Left-handed	Right-arm off break	
Rajandeep Singh	5 September 2002 (age 24)	Right-handed	Right-arm off break	
Aditya Singh	25 October 1998 (age 28)	Left-handed	Right-arm off break	
Shubh Sharma	6 November 2002 (age 24)	Right-handed	Right-arm medium	
Wicket-keepers
Kumar Kushagra	23 October 2004 (age 22)	Right-handed		Plays for **Gujarat Titans** in IPL
Robin Minz	13 September 2002 (age 24)	Right-handed		
**Ishan Kishan**	18 July 1998 (age 28)	Left-handed		**Captain**; Plays for **Sunrisers Hyderabad** in IPL
Pankaj Kumar	12 November 1999 (age 27)	Right-handed		
Spin-bowlers
Anukul Roy	30 November 1998 (age 27)	Left-handed	Slow left-arm orthodox	**Vice-Captain**; Plays for **Kolkata Knight Riders** in IPL
Manishi Singh	3 November 2003 (age 23)	Right-handed	Slow left-arm orthodox	
Fast-bowlers
Sushant Mishra	23 December 2002 (age 23)	Left-handed	Left-arm medium	Plays for **Rajasthan Royals** in IPL
Vikash Singh	28 June 1994 (age 32)	Left-handed	Left-arm medium	
Shubham Singh	6 December 1998 (age 27)	Right-handed	Right-arm medium	
Saurabh Shekhar	10 December 1999 (age 26)	Right-handed	Right-arm medium	
Jatin Pandey	1 May 2004 (age 22)	Right-handed	Right-arm medium	
Pratyush Kumar	10 September 2007 (age 19)	Right-handed	Right-arm medium	
Harsh Raj	9 November 2004 (age 22)	Right-handed	Left-arm medium	

Updated as on 17 November 2026

== Coaching staff ==
Coaching staff have one head coach.

- Head Coach :- S.S.Rao

Batting Coach :- Ratan Kumar

Physiotherapist- Bala Easwaran

Analyst:- Kunal Kr Singh

== See also ==
- Jharkhand State Cricket Association
