= Tamil Nadu cricket team =

Indian cricket team

Personnel
- Captain: Sai Kishore (FC); Narayan Jagadeesan (LA); Washington Sundar (T20)
- Coach: Lakshmipathy Balaji
- Owner: Tamil Nadu Cricket Association

Team information
- Colours: Yellow Dark Blue
- Founded: 1864
- Home ground: M. A. Chidambaram Stadium
- Capacity: 50,000

History
- First-class debut: Marylebone Cricket Club in 1927 at Madras Cricket Club Ground, Madras
- Ranji Trophy wins: 2
- Irani Cup wins: 1
- Deodhar Trophy wins: 1
- Vijay Hazare Trophy wins: 5
- Syed Mushtaq Ali Trophy wins: 3
- Official website: TNCA

The Tamil Nadu cricket team is a domestic cricket team run by Tamil Nadu Cricket Association representing the state of Tamil Nadu, India. It has been one of the most dominant teams in white-ball domestic cricket in India. The team plays in Ranji Trophy, the highest tier of the domestic first-class cricket tournament in India and in List A tournaments Vijay Hazare Trophy and Syed Mushtaq Ali Trophy. They have won the Ranji Trophy twice and have finished runners-up nine times.

They are the team that has won the Vijay Hazare Trophy and Syed Mushtaq Ali Trophy most often. They were the first team to win the Syed Mushtaq Ali Trophy in 2006/07. The team was known as Madras until the 1970–71 season before the Madras state was renamed Tamil Nadu. Tamil Nadu is the only team to win the five different Indian domestic trophies (Ranji Trophy, Irani Trophy, Syed Mushtaq Ali Trophy, Vijay Hazare Trophy and Deodhar Trophy).

== Home ground ==
The team is based at the M. A. Chidambaram Stadium, named after M. A. Chidambaram a former president of the BCCI. Established in 1916, it has a capacity of 38,000 and had floodlights installed in 1996.

== Honours ==
- Ranji Trophy
  - Winners (2): 1954–55, 1987–88
  - Runners-up (10): 1935–36, 1940–41, 1967–68, 1972–73, 1991–92, 1995–96, 2002–03, 2003–04, 2011–12, 2014–15
- Irani Cup
  - Winners: 1988-89
- Vijay Hazare Trophy
  - Winners (5): 2002-03, 2004-05, 2008-09, 2009-10, 2016-17
  - Runners-up (2): 2019-20, 2021-22
- Deodhar Trophy
  - Winners: 2016-17
- Syed Mushtaq Ali Trophy
  - Winners (3): 2006-07, 2020-21, 2021-22
  - Runners-up: 2019-20

== Famous players ==
Players from Tamil Nadu who have played Test cricket for India, along with year of Test debut:

- M. J. Gopalan (1934)
- Cotah Ramaswami (1936)
- C. R. Rangachari (1948)
- C. D. Gopinath (1951)
- A. G. Kripal Singh (1955)
- A. G. Milkha Singh (1960)
- V. V. Kumar (1961)
- S. Venkataraghavan (1965)
- Bharath Reddy (1979)
- T. E. Srinivasan (1981)
- Krishnamachari Srikkanth (1981)
- T. A. Sekhar (1983)
- Laxman Sivaramakrishnan (1983)
- Bharat Arun (1986)
- W. V. Raman (1988)
- M. Venkataramana (1989)
- Aashish Kapoor (1994)
- Robin Singh (1998)
- Sadagoppan Ramesh (1999)
- Hemang Badani (2001)
- Lakshmipathy Balaji (2003)
- Dinesh Karthik (2004)
- Murali Vijay (2008)
- Subramaniam Badrinath (2010)
- Abhinav Mukund (2011)
- Ravichandran Ashwin (2011)
- Washington Sundar (2021)
- T Natarajan (2021)
- Sai Sudharsan (2025)

Players from Tamil Nadu who have played ODI but not Test cricket for India, along with year of ODI debut :

- V. B. Chandrasekhar (1988)
- Thiru Kumaran (1999)
- Sridharan Sriram (2000)
- Vijay Shankar (2019)
- Varun Chakravarthy (2025)

Player(s) from Tamil Nadu who have played T20I but not ODI or Test cricket for India, along with year of T20I debut :

- Sai Kishore (2023)

Players from other state teams who also played for Tamil Nadu, and played cricket for India, along with year of debut:

- Vivek Razdan (1989)
- Sandeep Warrier (2021)
- Kuldeep Sen (2022)

Players from Tamil Nadu who have played international cricket for another country, along with year of debut:

- Balaji Rao (2008) - (Canada)

Prominent players without international cap

- A. G. Ram Singh (1934-1946)
- P. K. Belliappa (1959-1974)
- A. G. Satwender Singh (1963-1976)
- Abdul Jabbar (1972-1987)
- V. Sivaramakrishnan (1973-1989)
- S. Vasudevan (1976-1988)
- P. C. Prakash (1985-1990)
- Sunil Subramaniam (1988-1997)
- Divakar Vasu (1989-1998)
- Sridharan Sharath (1992-2007)
- Jayaraman Madanagopal (1998-2004)
- Baba Aparajith (2011-2024)
- Baba Indrajith (2013-present)
- Narayan Jagadeesan (2016-present)

== Current team squad ==
- Players with international caps are listed in **bold**.

Name	Birth date	Batting style	Bowling style	TNCA Club	Notes
Batsmen
Pradosh Ranjan Paul	21 December 2000 (age 25)	Left-handed	Right-arm off break	Vijay CC	
Andre Siddharth	28 August 2006 (age 20)	Right-handed		Jolly Rovers CC	
Baba Indrajith	8 July 1994 (age 32)	Right-handed	Right-arm leg break	Jolly Rovers CC	
Shahrukh Khan	27 May 1995 (age 31)	Right-handed	Right-arm off break	Alwarpet CC	
Vimal Khumar	3 December 2002 (age 23)	Left-handed		Jolly Rovers CC	
**Sai Sudharsan**	15 October 2001 (age 25)	Left-handed	Right-arm leg break	Jolly Rovers CC	Plays for **Gujarat Titans** in IPL
Tushar Raheja	7 February 2001 (age 25)	Left-handed		Alwarpet CC	
R Rajkumar	21 September 1993 (age 33)	Right-handed	Right-arm medium	Pristine CC	
Nidhish Rajagopal	30 January 2000 (age 26)	Left-handed	Right-arm medium	Vijay CC	
Amit Sathvik	19 September 2002 (age 24)	Right-handed		Pristine CC	
B Sachin	30 August 2003 (age 23)	Left-handed		Sea Hawks CC	
All-rounders
Sunny Sandhu	15 October 2003 (age 23)	Right-handed	Right-arm medium	Nelson SC	
**Washington Sundar**	5 October 1999 (age 27)	Left-handed	Right-arm off break	Globe Trotters SC	**Twenty20 Captain**; Plays for **Gujarat Titans** in IPL
Ajith Ram	5 September 1998 (age 28)	Left-handed	Slow left arm orthodox	Globe Trotters SC	
Wicket-keepers
Narayan Jagadeesan	24 December 1995 (age 30)	Right-handed		Vijay CC	**List A Captain**
Athish SR	17 July 2004 (age 22)	Left-handed		Mylapore RC (A)	
Spin Bowlers
**Sai Kishore**	6 November 1996 (age 30)	Left-handed	Slow left arm orthodox	Vijay CC	**First-class Captain**; Plays for **Gujarat Titans** in IPL
**Varun Chakravarthy**	29 August 1991 (age 35)	Right-handed	Right-arm leg break	Vijay CC	Plays for **Kolkata Knight Riders** in IPL
J Hemchudeshan	7 June 2008 (age 18)	Right-handed	Right-arm off break	Vijay CC	
M Siddharth	3 July 1998 (age 28)	Left-handed	Slow left arm orthodox	Singam Puli	Plays for **Rajasthan Royals** in IPL
Pace Bowlers
Sonu Yadav	11 November 1999 (age 27)	Right-handed	Right-arm medium-fast	Jolly Rovers CC	
Gurjapneet Singh	8 November 1998 (age 28)	Right-handed	Left-arm medium-fast	Vijay CC	Plays for **Chennai Super Kings** in IPL
G Govinth	26 January 2004 (age 22)	Right-handed	Right-arm medium	Vijay CC	
P Saravana Kumar	26 August 1989 (age 37)	Right-handed	Right-arm medium	Mylapore RC (A)	
Athisayaraj Davidson	6 June 1992 (age 34)	Right-handed	Right-arm medium	Crombest RC	

Updated as on 17 November 2026
