= Sports in Andhra Pradesh =

Sports in Andhra Pradesh has its own importance, where many sporting personalities were into limelight. The Sports Authority of Andhra Pradesh (SAAP) undertakes the sports development activities such as construction of stadiums, establishment of sports academies and other sporting related activities. The sports infrastructure have increased tremendously by improving infrastructure in outdoor and Indoor stadiums, play fields, sports academies, sports equipments etc. Traditional sports such as kho kho, kabaddi are played mostly in Andhra Pradesh. Most sports players from Andhra Pradesh represent national level competitions and very few international competitions.

== History ==
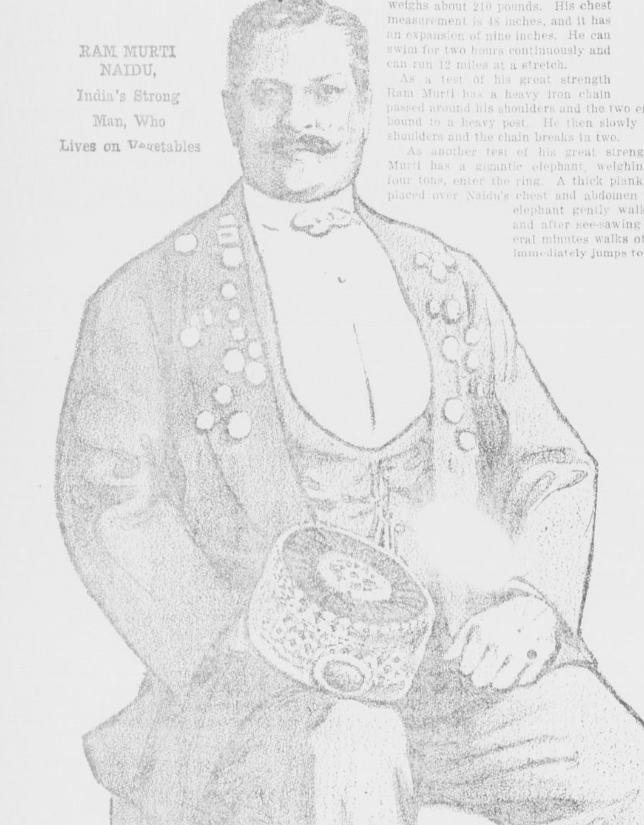
Kodi Rammurthy Naidu

Kodi Rammurthy Naidu was an strongman, bodybuilder, and wrestler of the state. He was renowned for his strength and physical prowess and for feats performed in 1911 such as stopping two cars using his muscle power and taking an elephant on his chest.

== Cricket ==
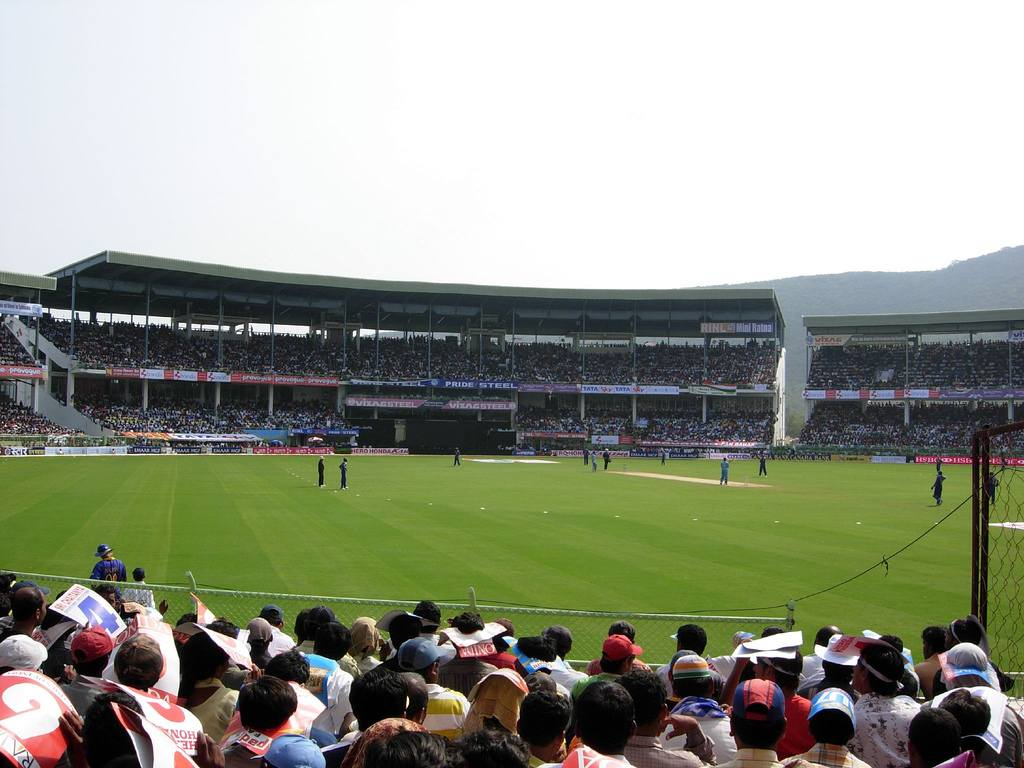
ACA-VDCA Stadium, Visakhapatnam

Cricket is one of the most popular sports in the state. The Dr. Y. S. Rajasekhara Reddy International Cricket Stadium in Visakhapatnam is the home to Andhra Pradesh cricket team. The venue regularly hosts international as well as domestic matches. Notable cricketers from Andhra Pradesh, include C. K. Nayudu, Maharajkumar of Vizianagram, M. V. Narasimha Rao, M. S. K. Prasad, V.V.S. Laxman, Tirumalasetti Suman, Arshad Ayub, Ambati Rayudu, Venkatapathy Raju, Sravanthi Naidu, Yalaka Venugopal Rao and Hanuma Vihari.

The Andhra Cricket Association (central zone) has an Amaravati International Cricket Stadium in Mangalagiri, Amaravati of Guntur district. Former India batsman VVS Laxman, inaugurated Andhra Cricket Association's Central Zone Academy in June 2013 at this venue. Andhra Cricket Association is the headquarters of the India national women's cricket team.

On 15 April 2026, the NTR Cricket Stadium at Gollavanigunta was inaugurated by IT and HRD Minister Nara Lokesh to boost regional sports infrastructure.

== Chess ==
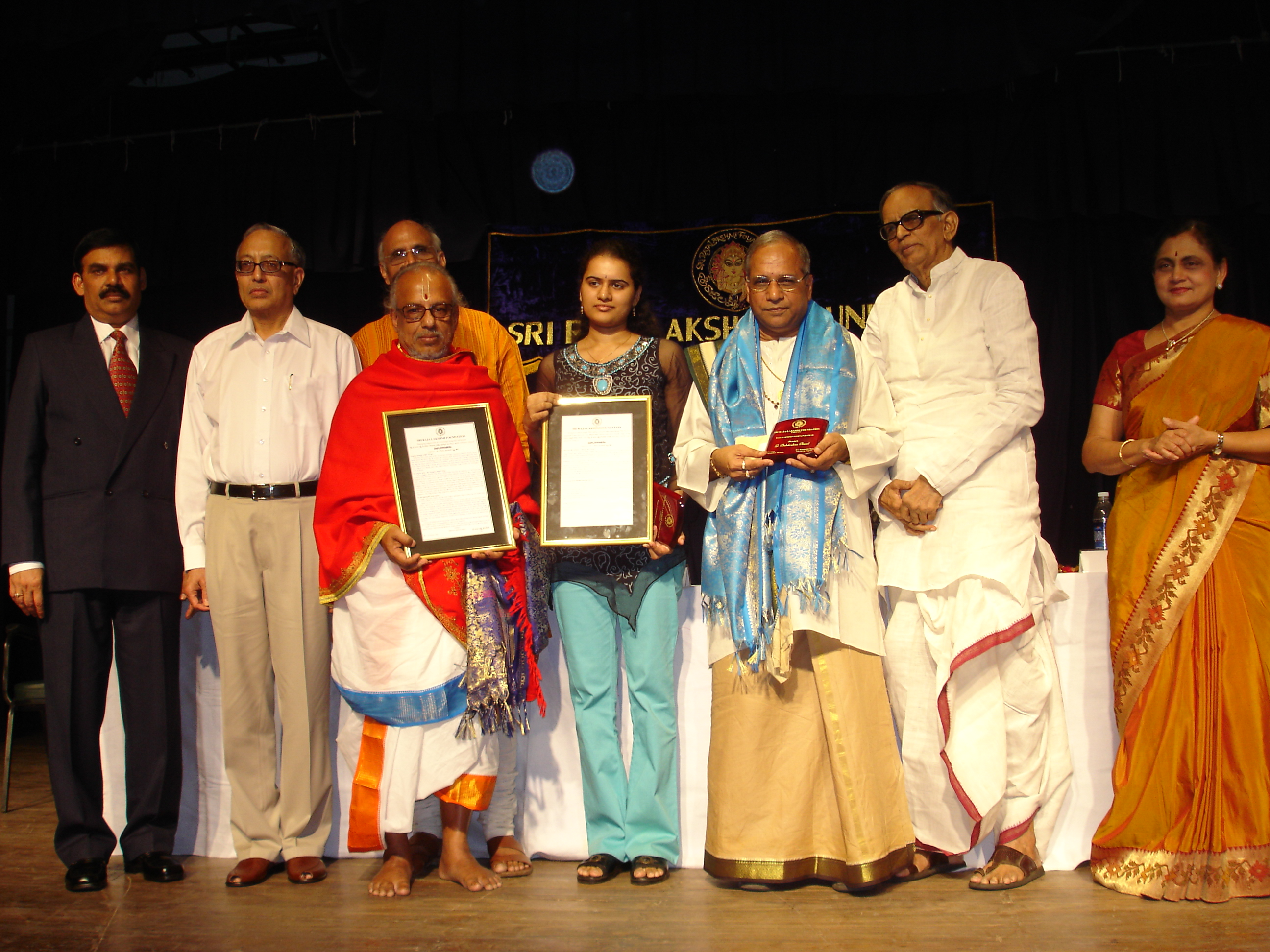

Humpy Koneru, from Gudivada of Krishna district of the state, is an Indian chess Grandmaster. Koneru (during 2002-08 period), held the record as the youngest woman ever to become a grand master. In 2001 she won the World Junior Girls Chess Championship. She is currently in the lead in the FIDE Women's Grand Prix 2013–2014 and won many awards namely Asia's youngest International Woman Master (1999), World under-14 championship, Castellan, Spain (2001), India's youngest Woman Grand Master (2001), World Junior Championship, Athens (2001), Arjuna Award in (2003).

Pentala Harikrishna, is a chess player from Guntur, Andhra Pradesh. became the youngest grandmaster from India on 12 September 2001. Won gold medals in Commonwealth Chess Championship (1999, 2000, 2001), Ron Banwell MSO Masters tournament (2001), World Junior Champion (2004), Asian Games (2006), Spice Cup Tournament (2008), Nancy closed chess tournament (2009), Chigorin Memorial (blitz) (2009), Asian Team Chess Championship (2009), New York Open (2010), Asian Continental Individual Chess Championship (2011).

Dronavalli Harika is a chess grandmaster from Guntur district of Andhra Pradesh. She won the Asian Individual Women Chess Championship. Her achievements include the Commonwealth Women's Championship (2006, 2007, 2010), World Youth Chess Championship titles (2004), Bronze medal in 2010 Asian Games in Woman's individual rapid event, second Indian woman Grandmaster (after Koneru Humpy). She was awarded the Arjuna Award in 2007.

== Weight lifting ==
Karnam Malleswari, the first female Indian to win an Olympic medal, hails from Srikakulam district of Andhra Pradesh. She won the bronze medal on 19 September 2000, in the 69 kg category with a lift of 240 kg. Dandamudi Rajagopal Rao, the first male Indian to win 13 Year national weightlifting champion.

== Badminton ==
Pullela Gopichand, is a former Indian badminton player. He won the All England Open Badminton Championships (2001), to becoming the second Indian to achieve it after Prakash Padukone.

He won his National Badminton Championship 5 times in a row (1996-2000). He won two gold and one silver at the Indian national games (1998), Toulouze open championship in France (1999) and the Scottish Open championship. He won many awards namely Arjuna Award (1999), Rajiv Gandhi Khel Ratna (2001), Padma Shri (2005), Dronacharya Award (2009), Padma Bhushan (2014)

Chetan Anand is a badminton player from Vijayawada. Chetan Anand was a four time National Badminton champion in 2004, 2007, 2008 and 2010.

== See also ==
- Aadudam Andhra
