= 2012–13 Vijay Hazare Trophy =

Indian cricket tournament

- Dates: 13 February – 3 March 2013
- Administrator(s): BCCI
- Cricket format: List A cricket
- Tournament format(s): Round-robin and Playoff format
- Host(s): Various
- Champions: Delhi (1st title)
- Runners-up: Assam
- Participants: 27
- Matches: 69
- Most runs: Robin Uthappa (445) (Karnataka)
- Most wickets: Pritam Das (18) (Assam)

The 2012–13 Vijay Hazare Trophy was the 20th edition of the Vijay Hazare Trophy, an annual List A cricket tournament in India. It was contested between 27 domestic cricket teams, starting on 13 February and finishing on 3 March 2013. In the final, Delhi beat Assam by 75 runs to win their maiden title.

== Group Matches ==
Central Zone

Team	Played	W	L	Tied	NR	Points
Madhya Pradesh	4	3	1	0	0	15
Uttar Pradesh	4	3	1	0	0	12
Rajasthan	4	2	2	0	0	8
Railways	4	1	3	0	0	4
Vidarbha	4	1	3	0	0	1

- Madhya Pradesh and Uttar Pradesh qualified for the knockout stage.

East Zone

Team	Played	W	L	Tied	NR	Points
Assam	4	3	1	0	0	14
Bengal	4	3	1	0	0	12
Odisha	4	2	2	0	0	8
Tripura	4	1	3	0	0	4
Jharkhand	4	1	3	0	0	2

- Assam and Bengal qualified for the knockout stage.

North Zone

Team	Played	W	L	Tied	NR	Points
Punjab	5	4	0	0	1	21
Delhi	5	3	0	0	2	18
Himachal Pradesh	5	1	2	0	2	8
Services	5	1	2	0	2	7
Haryana	5	1	2	0	2	6
Jammu and Kashmir	5	0	4	0	1	0

- Punjab and Delhi qualified for the knockout stage.

South Zone

Team	Played	W	L	Tied	NR	Points
Karnataka	5	5	0	0	0	20
Kerala	5	4	1	0	0	17
Andhra Pradesh	5	3	2	0	0	13
Tamil Nadu	5	2	3	0	0	9
Hyderabad	5	1	4	0	0	3
Goa	5	0	5	0	0	-2

- Karnataka and Kerala qualified for the knockout stage.

West Zone

Team	Played	W	L	Tied	NR	Points
Gujarat	4	3	1	0	0	13
Mumbai	4	3	1	0	0	12
Baroda	4	2	2	0	0	9
Maharashtra	4	2	2	0	0	8
Saurashtra	4	0	4	0	0	-2

- Gujarat and Mumbai qualified for the knockout stage.

== Knockout Matches ==
=== Preliminary Quarterfinal 1 ===
26 February 2013
Scorecard

Uttar Pradesh; 194 (45.2 overs)	v	Karnataka; 197/3 (47.3 overs)
Mohammed Kaif 37 (58); HS Sharath 3/46 (10 overs)		KL Rahul 104* (152); Imtiaz Ahmed 2/52 (12 overs)

Karnataka won by 7 wickets
Dr. Y.S. Rajasekhara Reddy ACA-VDCA Cricket Stadium, Vishakhapatnam
Umpires: Amiesh Saheba and Rajesh Deshpande

- Karnataka won the toss and elected to field.

=== Preliminary Quarterfinal 2 ===
26 February 2013
Scorecard

Madhya Pradesh; 210 (48.4 overs)	v	Assam; 211/6 (45.5 overs)
Naman Ojha 74 (108); Abu Nechim 5/32 (10 overs)		Sibsankar Roy 97* (110); Ishwar Pandey 2/36 (8.5 overs)

Assam won by 4 wickets
Port Trust Diamond Jubilee Stadium, Vishakhapatnam
Umpires: Chettithody Shamshuddin and KN Ananthapadmanabhan

- Madhya Pradesh won the toss and elected to bat.

=== Quarterfinal 1 ===
27 February 2013
Scorecard

Gujarat; 126 (32 overs)	v	Delhi; 130/2 (28.4 overs)
Axar Patel 30 (34); Sumit Narwal 5/21 (7 overs)		Gautam Gambhir 44* (67); Roosh Kalaria 2/27 (8 overs)

Delhi won by 8 wickets
Dr. Y.S. Rajasekhara Reddy ACA-VDCA Cricket Stadium, Vishakhapatnam
Umpires: KN Ananthapadmanabhan and C. K. Nandan

- Delhi won the toss and elected to field.

=== Quarterfinal 2 ===
27 February 2013
Scorecard

Kerala; 320/6 (50 overs)	v	Punjab; 274 (47.3 overs)
VA Jagadeesh 119 (120); Yuvraj Singh 3/39 (7 overs)		Gurkeerat Singh Mann 99 (106); Prasanth Parameswaran 3/40 (8.3 overs)

Kerala won by 46 runs
Port Trust Diamond Jubilee Stadium, Vishakhapatnam
Umpires: Amiesh Saheba and Rajesh Deshpande

- Punjab won the toss and elected to field.

=== Quarterfinal 3 ===
28 February 2013
Scorecard

Karnataka; 127 (32.1 overs)	v	Bengal; 128/0 (28.3 overs)
Manish Pandey 28 (34); Mohammed Shami 3/32 (8.2 overs)		Shreevats Goswami 70*(79); Abhimanyu Mithum 0/16 (6 overs)

Bengal won by 10 wickets
Port Trust Diamond Jubilee Stadium, Vishakhapatnam
Umpires: Amiesh Saheba and Rajesh Deshpande

- Bengal won the toss and elected to field.

=== Quarterfinal 4 ===
28 February 2013
Scorecard

Assam; 178 (47.4 overs)	v	Mumbai; 151 (46.5 overs)
Sibsankar Roy 69 (116); Aavishkar Salvi 3/25 (8 overs)		Shoaib Shaikh 42 (84); Abu Nechim 3/31 (10 overs)

Assam won by 27 runs
Dr. Y.S. Rajasekhara Reddy ACA-VDCA Cricket Stadium, Vishakhapatnam
Umpires: Chettithody Shamshuddin and C. K. Nandan

- Mumbai won the toss and elected to field.

=== Semifinal 1 ===
2 March 2013
Scorecard

Bengal; 156 (40.1 overs)	v	Delhi; 160/4 (34.3 overs)
Manoj Tiwary 87 (111); Varun Sood 3/48 (8 overs)		Gautam Gambhir 69 (78); Iresh Saxena 1/24 (7 overs)

Delhi won by 6 wickets
Port Trust Diamond Jubilee Stadium, Vishakhapatnam
Umpires: Amiesh Saheba and Rajesh Deshpande

- Delhi won the toss and elected to field.

=== Semifinal 2 ===
2 March 2013
Scorecard

Kerala; 197 (48.5 overs)	v	Assam; 200/5 (46 overs)
VA Jagadeesh 89 (109); Gokul Sharma 3/30 (10 overs)		Gokul Sharma 52*(54); Prasanth Parameswaran 2/25 (9 overs)

Assam won by 5 wickets
Dr. Y.S. Rajasekhara Reddy ACA-VDCA Cricket Stadium, Vishakhapatnam
Umpires: Sudhir Asnani and Krishnamachari Bharatan

- Assam won the toss and elected to field.

== Final ==
3 March 2013
Scorecard

Delhi; 290/9 (50 overs)	v	Assam; 215 (44.2 overs)
Unmukt Chand 116 (133); Pritam Das 3/54 (11 overs)		Dheeraj Jadhav 87 (114); Rajat Bhatia 3/36 (7 overs)

Delhi won by 75 runs
Dr. Y. S. Rajasekhara Reddy International Cricket Stadium, Vishakhapatnam
Umpires: Sudhir Asnani and Krishnamachari Bharatan
Player of the match: Nitish Rana (Delhi)

- Assam won the toss and elected to field.
