= Jay Desai =

Indian cricketer

Personal information
- Full name: Jaykumar Dineshchandra Desai
- Born: 30 January 1987 (age 39); Kathodia, Gujarat, India
- Batting: Right-handed
- Bowling: Right-arm off break
- Role: Batting all-rounder

Career statistics
Competition	FC	LA	T20
Matches	14	7	19
Runs scored	447	77	294
Batting average	19.43	11.00	22.61
100s/50s	1/1	–/–	–/1
Top score	108	35	51*
Balls bowled	36	114	66
Wickets	0	4	4
Bowling average	–	24.00	31.25
5 wickets in innings	–	–	–
10 wickets in match	–	–	–
Best bowling	–/–	3/4	3/30
Catches/stumpings	6/–	4/–	5/–
- Source: ESPNcricinfo, 25 January 2022

Jaykumar Dineshchandra Desai (born 30 January 1987) is an Indian cricketer who plays for Gujarat in the Ranji Trophy and the Vijay Hazare Trophy. He also additionally plays for the Lone Star Athletics in Minor League Cricket.

== Career ==
Desai started playing cricket at the age of 10 in the village of Kathodia, in Gujarat. He was selected by Gujarat in early 2007 as he made his debut for Gujarat versus Saurashtra in the 47th game of the 2006-07 Vijay Hazare Trophy, scoring 20 off 18, and suffering a marginal 6-run loss. He later was selected to play for Gujarat in the 2007 Inter-State T20 Championship, making his T20 debut against Maharashtra, winning the game by 5 runs. He went on to score 104 runs from 7 innings out of 8. He was then selected for Gujarat in the 2007-08 Ranji Trophy where he made his FC debut against Vidarbha scoring 19 & 8, winning the game by 50 runs. He goes on to score a total of 54 runs in 6 innings of 3 games. Desai wasn't picked up for the 2008-09 Vijay Hazare Trophy, but played during the 2009-10 Syed Mushtaq Ali Trophy, scoring 108 runs from 4 matches at an average of 36. Desai was then selected into the Gujarati squad for the 2009-10 Ranji Trophy, where he made 108 against Tamil Nadu to help to draw against them. He also additionally made 76 against Railways to give Gujarat a fighting chance, but missed the follow-on target by 5 runs, losing the game. He amassed a total of 295 runs from a total of 12 innings in 7 games during the season. Desai played once more during the 2010-11 Vijay Hazare Trophy, but had a poor performance, scoring only 2 runs out of the 3 games he played in. He was also separately selected again for his final Mushtaq Trophy outing, where he scored 60 runs from 4 matches at an average of 20. This performance selected him into the Gujarat side which would play the Kenya national cricket team in 3 matches in preparation for the 2011 Cricket World Cup. He partook in the second match and made 72 to take Gujarat to a 206-run win over Kenya. He also played in what would be his last Ranji Trophy outing. Desai made 98 runs in 6 innings of 4 games to end his Ranji career. He was then taken off the cricketing radar until he was selected to play for the Indian Income Tax cricket team in the 2013–14 BCCI Corporate Trophy. His good performance during the trophy allowed him to return in the Gujarati side for the 2013-14 Syed Mushtaq Ali Trophy. However, he was dropped after the season ended. He then immigrated to the US in hopes of playing for the United States national cricket team. He was selected for the Lone Star Athletics to play in the 2021 Minor League Cricket season.
