= D. V. Subba Rao =

Indian lawyer, politician and cricket administrator

Mayor of Visakhapatnam
- In office 1987–1992

President of the Andhra Cricket Association
- In office 1991–2002
- In office 2011–2014

Personal details
- Born: Durvasula Venkata Subba Rao; 1941
- Died: 21 December 2014 (aged 72–73) Visakhapatnam, Andhra Pradesh, India
- Party: Telugu Desam Party
- Children: 1 son, 2 daughters

Durvasula Venkata Subba Rao (1941 – 21 December 2014) was an Indian lawyer, politician, and cricket administrator. He served as the Mayor of Visakhapatnam from 1987 to 1992 and was affiliated with the Telugu Desam Party. He was elected as the Chairman of the Bar Council of India twice and served as the President of the Andhra Cricket Association multiple times.

== Career ==
Durvasula Venkata Subba Rao was born in 1941. He was elected Chairman of the Bar Council of India twice, which was notable for someone from a mofussil centre like Visakhapatnam. In 1987, he was elected Mayor of Visakhapatnam. During his tenure, he focused on the beautification of the city and developed various projects such as Gurajada Kalakshetram, Uda Park, and Appu Ghar.

In 1991, he was selected as the sole representative from India to participate in the International Conference of Mayors organised by UNICEF in Dakar, Senegal. Subba Rao also served as the Chairman of the Visakhapatnam Urban Development Authority, appointed by N. T. Rama Rao, the founder of the Telugu Desam Party.

=== Cricket ===
Rao played university-level cricket and served as the President of the Andhra Cricket Association multiple times. He was also the president of the Visakhapatnam District Cricket Association.

In 1997, he accompanied the India national cricket team, led by Sachin Tendulkar, to the West Indies as the administrative manager. Under his presidency, Visakhapatnam hosted its first One Day International match at the Municipal Corporation Stadium.

Rao served on several Board of Control for Cricket in India (BCCI) committees and was a member of the Justice V. S. Malimath Committee on criminal justice reforms. He also led the Andhra University team in the all-India inter-university cricket tournament.

Rao served as President of the Andhra Cricket Association from 1991 to 2002 and was re-elected in 2011, continuing in the role until his 2014 death.

== Personal life ==
Subba Rao was married and had one son and two daughters. On 21 December 2014, at the age of 83, he died after dealing with a chronic lung condition.
