= Rohan Raje =

Indian cricketer (born 1986)

Personal information
- Full name: Rohan Ravindra Raje
- Born: 3 September 1986 (age 40); Neral, Maharashtra, India
- Batting: Right-handed
- Bowling: Right-armed fast-medium

Domestic team information
- Years: Team
- 2006/07–2016/17: Mumbai
- 2008–2009: Mumbai Indians

Career statistics
| Competition | FC | LA | T20 |
|---|---|---|---|
| Matches | 1 | 5 | 30 |
| Runs scored | 2 | 32 | 27 |
| Batting average | 2.00 | 16.00 | 3.85 |
| 100s/50s | 0/0 | 0/0 | 0/0 |
| Top score | 2* | 21 | 11* |
| Balls bowled | 174 | 216 | 559 |
| Wickets | 3 | 3 | 34 |
| Bowling average | 27.66 | 71.66 | 22.08 |
| 5 wickets in innings | 0 | 0 | 0 |
| 10 wickets in match | 0 | - | - |
| Best bowling | 3/41 | 2/48 | 3/15 |
| Catches/stumpings | 0/– | 0/– | 14/– |
- Source: ESPNcricinfo, 1 December 2025

Rohan Ravindra Raje is an Indian former cricketer who played for Mumbai domestically between the 2006/2007 and 2016/2017 seasons. He also appeared with the Mumbai Indians of the Indian Premier League (IPL) in 2008 and 2009. A right-arm fast-medium bowler who batted right-handed, he played in 30 Twenty20 matches over his career, 10 of them in the IPL. After his career in major cricket ended, he founded a cricket academy and served as a selector for Mumbai's under-14 side, while returning to minor Indian cricket as a player in 2025.

== Early career ==
Born in Neral in Maharashtra on 3 September 1986, Raje debuted as part of Mumbai's youth system during the 2004/05 season, representing their Under-19 squad in both the Vinoo Mankad Trophy, a limited-overs competition, and the Cooch Behar Trophy, which featured multiple-day matches. Starting in the 2006/07 campaign, he made his first appearances in the C. K. Nayudu Trophy, a three-day competition for those 22 and younger. Also starting in the 2006/07 cricket season, Raje began playing for a cricket team representing the Indian Oil Corporation (IOC), starting an affiliation that spanned 12 non-consecutive seasons. Later that season, during the first Syed Mushtaq Ali Trophy (SMA Trophy), (Note: The competition was also known that year as the Inter State Twenty-20 Tournament.) Raje made his initial appearances in major cricket. Appearing twice for Mumbai in West Zone group play, he scored two runs, took the wicket of Pratik Desai, and had three catches.

In the 2007/08 season, Raje played in the Vijay Hazare Trophy for the first time, making a single appearance for Mumbai where he failed to record a wicket as a bowler and scored 11 runs as a batter. Much of his year was spent with Mumbai's Under-22 side, with whom he helped win the Nayudu Trophy. His performances with the Under-22 side and the IOC team that year were considered "consistent" by Cricinfo, and helped him receive a contract from the Mumbai Indians of the newly-formed Indian Premier League (IPL).

== Indian Premier League and later domestic career ==
Raje signed a US$40,000 contract to play for the Indians in 2008, double the base $20,000 salary for a rookie cricketer. (Note: A rookie was considered to be one who had not played in the Ranji Trophy at the time of signing.) During the year, he made six appearances in the debut IPL season, scoring eight runs and taking five wickets, including taking a pair of wickets at the cost of 16 runs in a victory against the eventual champions, the Rajasthan Royals. He credited teammates Sachin Tendulkar, Shaun Pollock and Dwayne Bravo with helping him improve as a player. Raje remained with the Indians during the second edition of the IPL, held in 2009 in South Africa, with his contract having been upgraded by US$10,000 in the interim. Raje appeared in four matches for the Indians, with most of his statistical contributions coming in a match against the Deccan Chargers, where he scored 11 of the 12 runs he recorded over the year and took his lone wicket, that of Adam Gilchrist, of the season. The 11 runs would become his career best in any T20 match, including later matches in the SMA Trophy. 2008 and 2009 represented the only seasons in which Raje would factor in the IPL.

After playing in only a SMA Trophy match during the 2009/10 cricket season, Raje played in all three cricket formats (first-class, List A, and Twenty20) with Mumbai for the only time in his career. In the 2010/11 SMA Trophy, Raje led Mumbai with eight wickets. He was not expected to make the 30-man roster for the Ranji Trophy but was placed on the team after injuries to Ajit Agarkar and Aavishkar Salvi. In his only Ranji Trophy appearance, he recorded three wickets, all in the first eight overs of the match, in a victory against Railways.

Between 2011/12 and 2013/14, Raje did not appear in major cricket, spending most of those years representing IOC and the Mumbai-based National Cricket Club in various minor competitions. He missed the entire 2011/12 season due to various injuries. Returning to Twenty20 cricket in the 2014/15 season, he played in all 7 of Mumbai's SMA Trophy matches that year, leading the side in wickets taken. Raje's three wickets for 15 runs in a Trophy match against Rajasthan represented his best bowling in any innings in major cricket. The following season, in a loss to Rajasthan in the Hazare Trophy, he would record his best batting total with 21 runs in an innings. His major career ended with two SMA Trophy matches in the 2016/17 campaign, while he played a final minor match for IOC in 2017.

== Post-Mumbai playing career and life ==
Raje lived in Badlapur when he founded a cricket academy there in 2021. He was a selector for Mumbai's under-14 side in 2025. During that same year, eight years after his final matches with Mumbai, and seven seasons following his most recent appearance representing IOC, Raje started a comeback in the minor T20 Mumbai League, winning man of the match in his first appearance with the Mumbai South Central (MSC) Maratha Royals. He also played well in the semifinal match against the Eagle Thane Strikers. Raje ultimately helped MSC win the league championship, scoring the runs that clinched the win in the final match.
