= Andhra Premier League =

T20 cricket league played in Andhra Pradesh, India

- Countries: India
- Administrator: Andhra Cricket Association
- Format: Twenty20
- First edition: 2022
- Latest edition: 2026
- Next edition: 2027
- Tournament format: Round-robin and Playoffs
- Number of teams: 7
- Current champion: Bhimavaram Bulls
- TV: JioHotstar
- Website: andhracricket.org/andhrapremierleague/

The Andhra Premier League (APL) is a Twenty20 franchise cricket tournament played in the state of Andhra Pradesh in India. It is organized by the Andhra Cricket Association (ACA) and sanctioned by the Board of Control for Cricket in India. It was first contested in 2022 by six teams and, as of 2026, is contested by seven. It is currently sponsored by GMR Group and consequently officially named the GMR APL.

== History ==
The Andhra Premier League was launched in July 2022. The tournament is played in a round-robin format followed by playoffs resulting in a total of 19 matches between 6 teams.

The inaugural season of the tournament was held from 6 to 17 July 2022. The second season of the tournament was held from 16 to 27 August 2023. The third season of the tournament was held from 30 June to 13 July 2024. The fourth season of the tournament started from 8th August, 2025 with an opening match between the Kakinada Kings and the Amaravthi Royals.

Andhra Pradesh High Court stays Andhra Premier League 2025 franchise auctions until further orders. Major relief for existing team owners challenging Andhra Cricket Association's unilateral and misleading auction process.

== Teams ==
=== Current teams ===
Seven new franchises are competing in the league from 2025 edition. The franchises are named after a city it is representing in the state.

Team locations

APL teams
Team	City / Region	Owner	Coach	Captain (2026 season)
Capital Amaravathi Royals	Amaravati	Aparna Marine Exports	Kaushik Chandana	Yara Sandeep
Bhimavaram Bulls	Bhimavaram	Marlin Global Energy, Pavanputra Sports and Entertainment	Nagini Kumar	Maramreddy Hemanth Reddy
Kakinada Kings	Kakinada	RK Sports	L. N. Prasad Reddy	Manish Golamaru
Royals of Rayalaseema	Rayalaseema	Akshara Enterprises India	T Vamsi Krishna	Dhruva Kumar Reddy
Simhadri Vizag Lions	Visakhapatnam	Steel Exchange India Ltd	A. G. Pradeep	Ricky Bhui
Tungabhadra Warriors	Kurnool	Vijetha Super Market	A. G. Praveen	Chengalpet Rajan Gnaneshwar
Vijayawada Sunshiners	Vijayawada	Mythri Movie Makers, Sun International		Ashwin Hebbar

=== Defunct teams ===
Ahead of the 2025 season, Six franchises competing in the league were defuncted. The franchises were named after a city or region in the state.

Team	City / Region	Period
Bezwada Tigers	Vijayawada	2022-24
Coastal Riders	Coastal Andhra	2022-24
Godavari Titans	Godavari Region	2022-24
Rayalaseema Kings	Rayalaseema	2022-24
Uttarandhra Lions	North Andhra	2022-24
Vizag Warriors	Visakhapatnam	2022-24

=== Timeline of teams ===
Present teams Former teams

== Tournament season and results ==
Season	Final			Venue	Player of the season
Season	Winner	Result	Runners up	Venue	Player of the season
2022	Coastal Riders; 176/8 (19.1)	Won by 7 runs Scorecard	Bezawada Tigers; 169/7 (20)	ACA–VDCA Cricket Stadium, Visakhapatnam	—N/a
2023	Rayalaseema Kings; 160/5 (16.3)	Won by 5 wickets Scorecard	Coastal Riders; 155/8 (18)	ACA–VDCA Cricket Stadium, Visakhapatnam	Maramreddy Reddy
2024	Vizag Warriors; 189/5 (20)	Won by 87 runs Scorecard	Uttarandhra Lions; 102/10 (16.3)	ACA–VDCA Cricket Stadium, Visakhapatnam	Ashwin Hebbar
2025	Tungabhadra Warriors; 195/5 (18)	Won by 5 wickets Scorecard	Capital Amaravathi Royals; 194/7 (20)	ACA–VDCA Cricket Stadium, Visakhapatnam	Hanuma Vihari
2026	Bhimavaram Bulls; 140/0(9)	Won by 10 wickets Scorecard	Simhadri Vizag Lions; 139/8 (20)	ACA International Cricket Stadium, Mangalagiri (APCR)	Ashwin Hebbar

== Team performance ==
- Teams are listed alphabetically.
  - C : Champions
  - RU : Runners-up
  - PO : team qualified for the Playoffs

Season Franchise	2022	2023	2024	2025	2026
Capital Amaravathi Royals				RU	3rd
Bhimavaram Bulls				3rd	C
Kakinada Kings				5th	5th
Royals of Rayalaseema				7th	6th
Simhadri Vizag Lions				6th	RU
Tungabhadra Warriors				C	7th
Vijayawada Sunshiners				4th	4th
~~Bezwada Tigers~~	RU	5th	6th		
~~Coastal Riders~~	C	RU	PO		
~~Godavari Titans~~	6th	PO	5th		
~~Rayalaseema Kings~~	PO	C	PO		
~~Uttarandhra Lions~~	PO	PO	RU		
~~Vizag Warriors~~	5th	6th	C		

=== Overall statistics ===
Franchise	App.	Mat.	W	L	NR
Capital Amaravathi Royals	2	18	12	6	0
Bhimavaram Bulls	2	18	10	6	2
Kakinada Kings	2	14	6	8	0
Royals of Rayalaseema	2	14	3	10	1
Simhadri Vizag Lions	2	17	8	7	2
Tungabhadra Warriors	2	17	8	9	0
Vijayawada Sunshiners	2	16	7	8	1
~~Bezwada Tigers~~	3	18	4	10	4
~~Coastal Riders~~	3	20	11	7	2
~~Godavari Titans~~	3	17	5	11	1
~~Rayalaseema Kings~~	3	22	12	6	4
~~Uttarandhra Lions~~	3	19	10	8	1
~~Vizag Warriors~~	3	18	9	9	0
