= Municipal Corporation Stadium =

Municipal Corporation Stadium may refer to one of the following stadia in India:

- Howrah Municipal Corporation Stadium in Howrah
- Municipal Corporation Stadium, Kozhikode in Kozhikode
- Thrissur Municipal Corporation Stadium in Kerala
- Municipal Corporation Stadium, Visakhapatnam in Andhra Pradesh
- Municipal Stadium, Vijayawada in Andhra Pradesh
