= 2007–08 Ranji Trophy =

Ranji trophy season

- The Ranji Trophy, which the winners get.
- Administrator: BCCI
- Cricket format: First-class cricket
- Tournament format(s): League and knockout
- Champions: Delhi (7th title)
- Participants: 27
- Most runs: Robin Uthappa (Karnataka) (854)
- Most wickets: Ranadeb Bose (Bengal) (57)

The 2007–08 Ranji Trophy was the 74th season of the Ranji Trophy. Delhi defeated Uttar Pradesh by nine wickets in the final.

== Group Matches ==
=== Ranji Trophy Super League ===
Group A

Team	Played	W	L	D	NR	Quotient	Points
Delhi	7	3	0	4	0	1.51	23
Saurashtra	7	3	0	4	0	0.955	23
Mumbai	7	2	0	5	0	1.128	19
Karnataka	7	2	1	4	0	1.345	16
Maharashtra	7	2	3	2	0	0.902	15
Tamil Nadu	7	1	2	4	0	1.214	13
Rajasthan	7	1	4	2	0	0.705	9
Himachal Pradesh	7	0	4	3	0	0.634	5

- Delhi and Saurashtra qualified for the knockout stage.

Group B

Team	Played	W	L	D	NR	Quotient	Points
Uttar Pradesh	7	3	0	4	0	1.51	23
Baroda	7	3	0	4	0	0.955	23
Andhra Pradesh	7	2	0	5	0	1.128	19
Orissa	7	2	1	4	0	1.345	16
Punjab	7	2	3	2	0	0.902	15
Hyderabad	7	1	2	4	0	1.214	13
Bengal	7	1	4	2	0	0.705	9

- Uttar Pradesh and Baroda qualified for the knockout stage.

== Knockout Matches ==
=== Semifinal 1 ===
5–9 January 2008
Scorecard

Baroda	v	Delhi
199 (64.4 overs); Shatrunjay Gaekwad 43 (65); Amit Bhandari 4/52 (16 overs)		271 (102.3 overs); Mithun Manhas 97 (188); Sankalp Vohra 4/39 (21.3 overs)
342 (98.2 overs); Yusuf Pathan 113 (81); Rajat Bhatia 3/42 (11 overs)		272/3 (79.4 overs); Gautam Gambhir 132 (179); Salim Veragi 1/43 (11.4 overs)

Delhi won by 7 wickets
Maharani Usharaje Trust Cricket Ground, Indore
Umpires: AY Gokhale and Ivaturi Shivram

- Baroda won the toss and elected to bat.

=== Semifinal 2 ===
5–9 January 2008
Scorecard

Uttar Pradesh	v	Saurashtra
188 (51.5 overs); Mohammad Kaif 80 (122); Sandip Maniar 6/88 (23 overs)		127 (37.3 overs); Jaydev Shah 57 (72); Praveen Kumar 4/40 (12.3 overs)
100 (44.1 overs); Suresh Raina 25 (27); Rakesh Dhruv 5/20 (14 overs)		113 (57.5 overs); Sitanshu Kotak 52 (130); Praveen Kumar 4/39 (22 overs)

Uttar Pradesh won by 48 runs
Moti Bagh Stadium, Baroda
Umpires: Shavir Tarapore and Suresh Shastri

- Saurashtra won the toss and elected to field.

=== Final ===
16–20 January 2008
Scorecard

Uttar Pradesh	v	Delhi
342 (110.1 overs); Tanmay Srivastava 105 (174); Pradeep Sangwan 4/80 (27.1 overs)		290 (98.1 overs); Rajat Bhatia 139 (218); Praveen Kumar 8/68 (32.1 overs)
177 (63.2 overs); Suresh Raina 85 (94); Pradeep Sangwan 5/46 (20 overs)		230/1 (55.1 overs); Gautam Gambhir 130* (154); Praveen Gupta 1/77 (14 overs)

Delhi won by 9 wickets
Wankhede Stadium, Mumbai
Umpires: Amiesh Saheba and Arani Jayaprakash

- Delhi won the toss and elected to field.

== Scorecards and averages ==
- CricketArchive
