= 2009–10 Syed Mushtaq Ali Trophy =

Indian cricket tournament

- Dates: 25 September 2009 – 16 March 2010
- Administrator(s): BCCI
- Cricket format: T20
- Tournament format(s): Round robin, then knockout
- Champions: Maharashtra (1st title)
- Participants: 26
- Matches: 63
- Most runs: Parvez Aziz (287) (Assam)
- Most wickets: Ganesh Gaikwad (11) (Maharashtra)

The 2009–10 Syed Mushtaq Ali Trophy was the second edition of the Syed Mushtaq Ali Trophy, an annual Twenty20 tournament in India. The first edition, then called the Inter State Twenty-20 Tournament, was held in April 2007 but the tournament was dropped ahead of the 2007–08 season. It was resurrected in 2009 and named in honour of Syed Mushtaq Ali. He was an opening batsman who holds the distinction of scoring the first overseas Test century by an Indian cricketer. He died in June 2005. 26 of the 27 Ranji Trophy teams took part in the tournament, the exception being Rajasthan, who withdrew. Maharashtra emerged as winners of the tournament.

== Group stage ==
=== South Zone ===
Team	Pld	W	L	T	NR	Pts	NRR
Tamil Nadu	5	2	0	0	3	14	1.622
Hyderabad	5	1	0	0	4	12	0.500
Karnataka	5	1	1	0	3	10	0.452
Andhra (Note: Head-to-head points: Andhra 4, Goa 0)	5	1	2	0	2	8	-0.344
Goa	5	1	2	0	2	8	-0.315
Kerala	5	0	1	0	4	8	-2.450

=== East Zone ===
Team	Pld	W	L	T	NR	Pts	NRR
Jharkhand	4	3	1	0	0	12	1.604
Assam	4	3	1	0	0	12	0.826
Orissa	4	3	1	0	0	12	0.712
Bengal	4	1	3	0	0	4	-0.380
Tripura	4	0	4	0	0	0	-3.103

=== North Zone ===
Team	Pld	W	L	T	NR	Pts	NRR
Himachal Pradesh (Note: Head-to-head points: Himachal Pradesh 4, Delhi 0)	5	4	1	0	0	16	0.368
Delhi	5	4	1	0	0	16	0.749
Punjab (Note: Head-to-head points: Punjab 4, Haryana 0)	5	3	2	0	0	12	0.718
Haryana	5	3	2	0	0	12	1.207
Jammu and Kashmir	5	1	4	0	0	4	-1.345
Services	5	0	5	0	0	0	-1.642

=== West Zone ===
Team	Pld	W	L	T	NR	Pts	NRR
Maharashtra (Note: Head-to-head points: Maharashtra 4, Mumbai 0)	4	3	1	0	0	12	0.252
Mumbai	4	3	1	0	0	12	1.244
Baroda	4	2	2	0	0	8	-0.343
Saurashtra (Note: Head-to-head points: Saurashtra 4, Gujarat 0)	4	1	3	0	0	4	-1.091
Gujarat	4	1	3	0	0	4	-0.073

=== Central Zone ===
Team	Pld	W	L	T	NR	Pts	NRR
Madhya Pradesh	3	3	1	0	0	12	0.791
Railways	3	2	0	0	0	8	0.629
Uttar Pradesh	3	1	2	0	0	4	-0.683
Vidarbha	3	0	3	0	0	0	-0.674

== Knockout stage ==
Pre-Quarter-finals
12 Mar 2010
Himachal Pradesh	159/7 (20 ov)
Jharkhand	148/4 (20 ov)
12 Mar 2010
Railways	155/7 (20 ov)
Assam	156/3 (19.1 ov)

Quarter-finals
13 Mar 2010
Madhya Pradesh	120 (20 ov)
Maharashtra	123/4 (16 ov)
14 Mar 2010
Tamil Nadu	158/7 (19.4 ov)
Himachal Pradesh	152/6 (20 ov)
13 Mar 2010
Hyderabad	182/3 (19 ov)
Mumbai	181/7 (20 ov)
14 Mar 2010
Delhi	170/5 (20 ov)
Assam	135 (17.4 ov)

Semi-finals
15 Mar 2010
Maharashtra	154/7 (19.4 ov)
Tamil Nadu	153/5 (20 ov)
15 Mar 2010
Hyderabad	158/5 (19 ov)
Delhi	157/8 (20 ov)

Finals
16 Mar 2010
Maharashtra	119 (18.4 ov)
Hyderabad	100 (20 ov)

=== Final ===
16 March 2010 (N)
Scorecard

Maharashtra; 119 (18.4 Overs)	v	Hyderabad; 100 (20 Overs)
Digambar Waghmare 29 (25); Akash Bhandari 3/25 (3.4 Overs)		Akash Bhandari 20 (14); Samad Fallah 4/12 (4 Overs)

Maharashtra won by 19 runs
Maharani Usharaje Trust Cricket Ground, Indore
Umpires: Belur Ravi and Suhas Phadkar

- Hyderabad won the toss and elected to field first.
