= Indira Gandhi Stadium (Vijayawada) =

Cricket ground in Andhra Pradesh, India

Coordinates: 16°30′18″N 80°38′17″E

Indira Gandhi Cricket Stadium
- Municipal Stadium
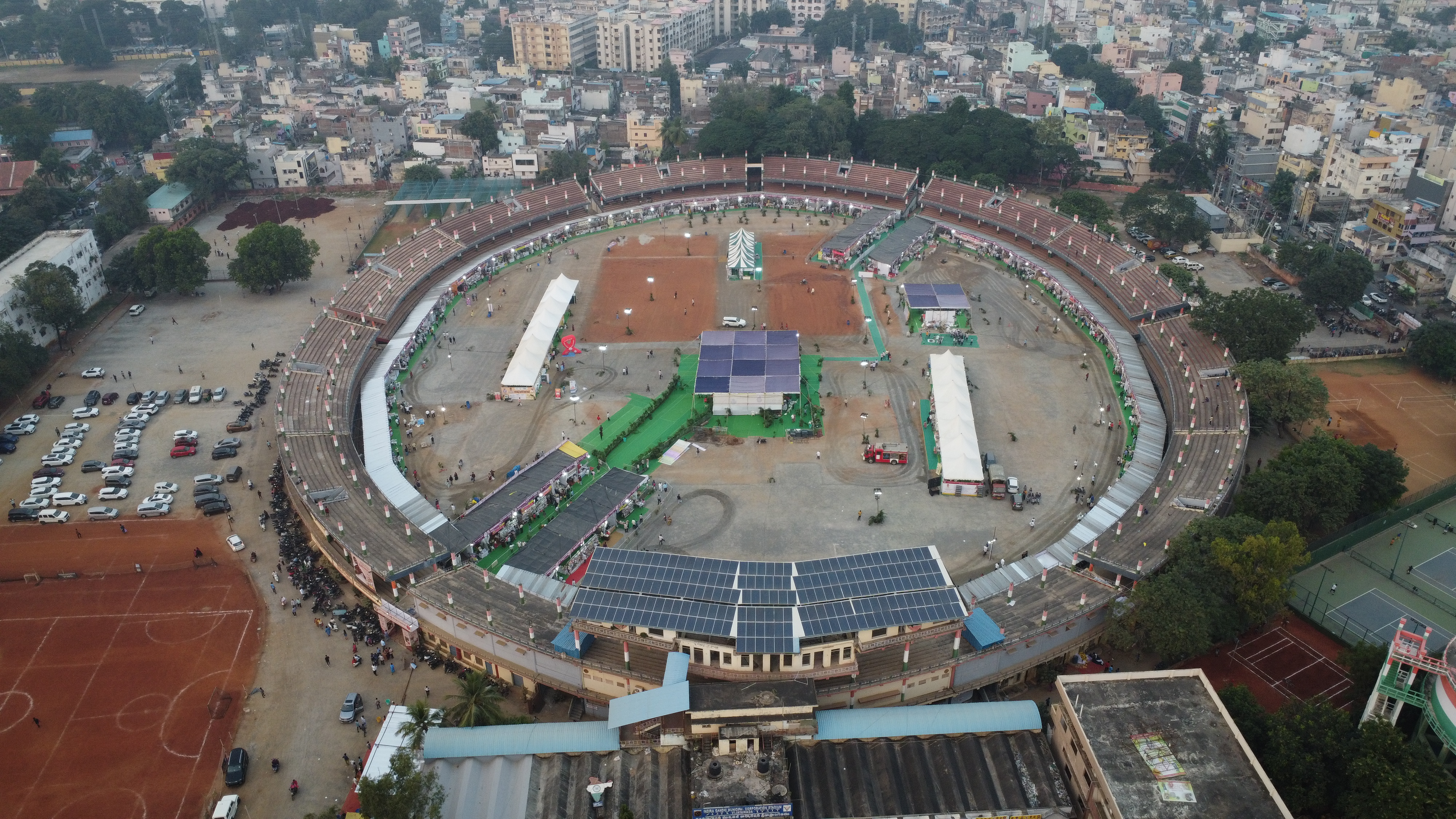
- Aerial view of the stadium
- Interactive map of Indira Gandhi Cricket Stadium

Ground information
- Location: Labbipet, Vijayawada, Andhra Pradesh, India
- Country: India
- Establishment: 1969
- Capacity: 25,000
- Owner: Andhra Cricket Association
- Architect: n/a
- Operator: Andhra Cricket Association
- Tenants: Andhra cricket team
- End names
- Dr. G .Ganga Raju End

International information
- Only men's ODI: 24 November 2002: India v West Indies
- Only women's ODI: 12 December 1997: England v Pakistan
- As of 9 December 2019; Source: ESPNcricinfo

Indira Gandhi Stadium (formerly Municipal Stadium) is located in Vijayawada city of the Indian state of Andhra Pradesh. The stadium has hosted a solitary ODI between India and West Indies on Sunday, 24 November 2002. It also hosted a WODI in December 1997 between England women and Pakistan women, which was won by England by 230 runs.

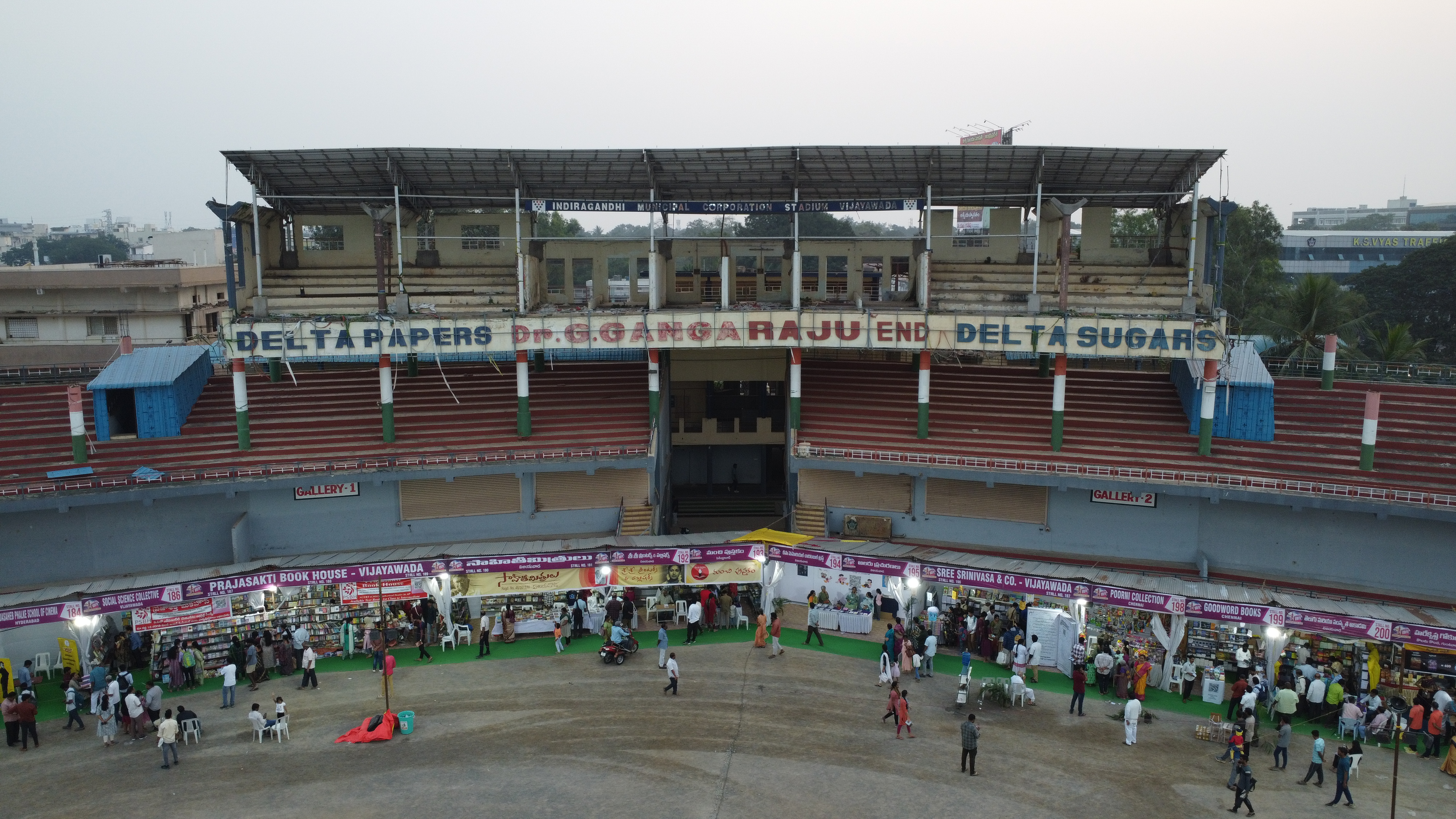
Dr. G .Ganga Raju End

National festivals like Independence Day, Republic Day and other cultural programmes have been held here after the state's bifurcation in June, 2014.

== List of centuries ==
=== Key ===
- * denotes that the batsman was not out.
- Inns. denotes the number of the innings in the match.
- Balls denotes the number of balls faced in an innings.
- NR denotes that the number of balls was not recorded.
- Parentheses next to the player's score denotes his century number at Edgbaston.
- The column title Date refers to the date the match started.
- The column title Result refers to the player's team result

=== One Day Internationals ===
| No. | Score | Player | Team | Balls | Inns. | Opposing team | Date | Result |
|---|---|---|---|---|---|---|---|---|
| 1 | 108* | Marlon Samuels | West Indies | 75 | 1 | India | 24 November 2002 | Won |

== See also ==
- ACA International Cricket Stadium
- ACA–KDCA Cricket Ground
