= Indira Priyadarshini Stadium =

Cricket stadium

Coordinates: 17°42′20.41″N 83°17′41.12″E

Ground information
- Location: Visakhapatnam, Andhra, India
- Country: India
- Establishment: 1987
- Capacity: 25,000
- Owner: Andhra Cricket Association
- Operator: Andhra Cricket Association
- Tenants: Indian Cricket Team; Andhra cricket team
- End names
- n/a

International information
- First ODI: 10 December, 1988: India v New Zealand
- Last ODI: 3 April, 2001: India v Australia
- As of 21 June 2014; Source: Indira Priyadarshini Stadium, ESPNcricinfo

Indira Priyadarsini Stadium is located in the coastal city (1 Town Area) of Visakhapatnam, Andhra Pradesh.

The 25,000 seat Indira Priyadarshini Stadium in this coastal town has hosted one-day cricket matches but was not yet a Test venue.

The stadium has hosted 5 ODI Matches and is also known as the Municipal Corporation Stadium. The first match was held on 9 December 1988 and the last of the 5 matches was held on 3 April 2001.

The stadium has been discontinued from hosting ODI matches in favour of the newer ACA-VDCA Stadium.

== One Day International cricket ==
The stadium has hosted following ODI matches.

Team (A)	Team (B)	Winner	Margin	Year
India	New Zealand	India	By 4 Wickets	1988
India	West Indies	India	By 4 Runs	1994
Australia	Kenya	Australia	By 97 Runs	1996
Pakistan	Sri Lanka	Sri Lanka	By 12 Runs	1999
India	Australia	Australia	By 93 Runs	2001

Game Statistics:

Category	Information
Highest Team Score	Australia (338/4 in 50 Overs against India)
Lowest Team Score	New Zealand (196/9 in 50 Overs against India)
Best Batting Performance	Mark Waugh (130 Runs against Kenya)
Best Bowling Performance	Kris Srikkanth (5/27 against New Zealand)

== List of Centuries ==
=== Key ===
- * denotes that the batsman was not out.
- Inns. denotes the number of the innings in the match.
- Balls denotes the number of balls faced in an innings.
- NR denotes that the number of balls was not recorded.
- Parentheses next to the player's score denotes his century number at Edgbaston.
- The column title Date refers to the date the match started.
- The column title Result refers to the player's team result

=== One Day Internationals ===
No.	Score	Player	Team	Balls	Inns.	Opposing team	Date	Result
1	114*	Navjot Singh Sidhu	India	103	1	West Indies	7 November 1994	Won
2	130	Mark Waugh	Australia	128	1	Kenya	23 February 1996	Won
3	101	Mahela Jayawardene	Sri Lanka	138	1	Pakistan	27 March 1999	Lost
4	111	Matthew Hayden	Australia	113	1	India	3 April 2001	Won
5	101	Ricky Ponting	Australia	109	1	India	3 April 2001	Lost

== List of Five Wicket Hauls ==
=== Key ===
Symbol	Meaning
†	The bowler was man of the match
‡	10 or more wickets taken in the match
§	One of two five-wicket hauls by the bowler in the match
Date	Day the Test started or ODI was held
Inn	Innings in which five-wicket haul was taken
Overs	Number of overs bowled.
Runs	Number of runs conceded
Wkts	Number of wickets taken
Econ	Runs conceded per over
Batsmen	Batsmen whose wickets were taken
Drawn	The match was drawn.

=== One Day Internationals ===
No.	Bowler	Date	Team	Opposing team	Inn	Overs	Runs	Wkts	Econ	Batsmen	Result
1	Krishnamachari Srikkanth †	10 December 1988	India	New Zealand	1	7	27	5	3.85	Ken Rutherford; Trevor Franklin; Ian Smith; Chris Kuggeleijn; John Bracewell	Won

== Trivia ==
- Kris Srikkanth has the best all-round individual performance in the stadium with a match stats of 70 Runs (87b, 8x4), 7-0-27-5 and 1 Catch
- India has played in 3 of the 5 games and have won two of these games
- The Stadium was the venue of the 1996 Cricket World Cup match between Australia and Kenya
