= 2010–11 Syed Mushtaq Ali Trophy =

Indian cricket tournament

- Dates: 14 October 2010 – 16 March 2011
- Administrator(s): BCCI
- Cricket format: T20
- Tournament format(s): Round robin, then knockout
- Champions: Bengal (1st title)
- Participants: 27
- Matches: 69
- Most runs: Manoj Tiwary (251) (Bengal)
- Most wickets: TP Sudhindra (14) (Madhya Pradesh)

The 2010–11 Syed Mushtaq Ali Trophy was the third edition of the Syed Mushtaq Ali Trophy, an annual Twenty20 tournament in India. It was contested by all 27 Ranji Trophy teams. Bengal emerged as champions.

== Group stage ==
=== East Zone ===
Team	Pld	W	L	T	NR	Pts	NRR
Bengal	4	4	0	0	0	16	1.238
Orissa	4	3	1	0	0	12	0.257
Assam	4	2	2	0	0	8	-0.312
Tripura	4	1	3	0	0	4	-0.512
Jharkhand	4	0	4	0	0	0	-0.700

=== South Zone ===
Team	Pld	W	L	T	NR	Pts	NRR
Tamil Nadu	5	5	0	0	0	20	1.355
Kerala	5	3	1	0	1	14	0.397
Karnataka	5	3	2	0	0	12	-0.174
Hyderabad	5	2	3	0	0	8	0.850
Goa	5	1	4	0	0	8	-0.975
Andhra	5	0	4	0	1	0	-1.716

=== North Zone ===
Team	Pld	W	L	T	NR	Pts	NRR
Delhi	5	5	0	0	0	20	0.926
Haryana (Note: Head-to-head points: Haryana 4, Services 0)	5	3	2	0	0	12	0.521
Services	5	3	2	0	0	12	0.035
Punjab (Note: Head-to-head points: Punjab 4, Himachal Pradesh 0)	5	2	3	0	0	8	0.016
Himachal Pradesh	5	2	3	0	0	8	0.263
Jammu and Kashmir	5	0	5	0	0	0	-1.686

=== West Zone ===
Team	Pld	W	L	T	NR	Pts	NRR
Mumbai	4	4	0	0	0	16	1.065
Maharashtra	4	3	1	0	0	12	0.325
Baroda	4	2	2	0	0	8	0.248
Saurashtra	4	1	3	0	0	4	-0.892
Gujarat	4	0	4	0	0	0	-0.725

=== Central Zone ===
Team	Pld	W	L	T	NR	Pts	NRR
Vidarbha (Note: Head-to-head points: Vidarbha 4, Madhya Pradesh 0)	4	3	1	0	0	12	0.413
Madhya Pradesh	4	3	1	0	0	12	1.064
Rajasthan	4	2	2	0	0	8	-0.993
Uttar Pradesh (Note: Head-to-head points: Uttar Pradesh 4, Railways 0)	4	1	3	0	0	4	-0.240
Railways	4	1	3	0	0	4	-0.251

== Knockout stage ==
Pre-Quarter-finals
12 Mar 2011
Bengal	167/4 (20 ov)
Vidarbha	136/7 (20 ov)
12 Mar 2011
Mumbai	140/7 (20 ov)
Haryana	143/6 (19.3 ov)

Quarter-finals
13 Mar 2011
Tamil Nadu	150/2 (16.1 ov)
Delhi	144/4 (20 ov)
14 Mar 2011
Bengal	171/5 (20 ov)
Maharashtra	122/7 (20 ov)
14 Mar 2011
Kerala	135 (19.5 ov)
Haryana	155/8 (20 ov)
13 Mar 2011
Madhya Pradesh	127/2 (17.4 ov)
Orissa	126/9 (20 ov)

Semi-finals
15 Mar 2011
Tamil Nadu	59 (16.2 ov)
Bengal	114/8 (20 ov)
15 Mar 2011
Haryana	115/9 (20 ov)
Madhya Pradesh	116/8 (19.5 ov)

Finals
16 Mar 2011
Bengal	142/7 (20 ov)
Madhya Pradesh	141/8 (20 ov)

=== Final ===
16 March 2011
Scorecard

Bengal; 142/7 (20 Overs)	v	Madhya Pradesh; 141/8 (20 Overs)
Subhomoy Das 49 (29); Amarjeet Singh 3/39 (4 Overs)		Harpreet Singh Bhatia 51 (44); Mohammed Shami 1/21 (4 Overs)

Bengal won by 1 run
Rajiv Gandhi International Stadium, Hyderabad
Umpires: Ravi Subramanian and Sanjay Hazare

- Madhya Pradesh won the toss and elected to field first.
