= Syed Mushtaq Ali Trophy =

Twenty20 cricket championship in India

- Countries: India
- Administrator: Board of Control for Cricket in India
- Format: Twenty20
- First edition: 2006–07
- Latest edition: 2025–26
- Next edition: 2026–27
- Tournament format: Round-robin and knockout
- Number of teams: 38
- Current champion: Jharkhand (1st title)
- Most successful: Tamil Nadu (3 titles)
- Website: BCCI

The Syed Mushtaq Ali Trophy is a domestic Twenty20 cricket championship in India, organized by the Board of Control for Cricket in India (BCCI). It is named after former Test cricketer Syed Mushtaq Ali.

It is played by the teams from the Ranji Trophy, which is the premier domestic first-class cricket championship in the country. In 2006–07, the inaugural competition was won by Tamil Nadu under the captaincy of Dinesh Karthik. The 2025–26 tournament was won by Jharkhand, who defeated Haryana in the final. Tamil Nadu has been the most successful team, winning the trophy three times.

== History ==
The tournament is played under Twenty20 (T20) rules. Originally known as the Inter-State T20 Championship, it was inaugurated by the Board of Control for Cricket in India (BCCI) for the 2006–07 season. Except in 2016–17, the tournament has been contested by teams involved in the Ranji Trophy, 27 at first and currently (2023) 38. The format begun with a round-robin stage with the teams divided into zonal groups, with the top teams in each group qualifying for a knockout stage culminating in the final tie. In 2012–13, the BCCI decided to replace the knockout with a Super League consisting of two groups, the winners of which qualified for the final. In June 2016, the BCCI relaunched the competition using zonal teams, as in the Duleep Trophy, but they reverted to the Ranji teams in 2017. Since then, the number of competing teams have increased to 38 and the knockout stage has been restored.

== Format ==
The 38 teams are divided into five Elite groups, namely A, B, C, D, and E. There used to be a Plate group for newer teams but it has been discontinued. There are eight teams in groups A, B, and C who play seven matches each. Groups D and E have seven teams who play six matches each. The top-ranked teams in each group qualify for the knockout stage along with the three best runners-up. The knockout consists of four quarter-final matches, two semi-finals and the final.

== Current teams ==
The competition features the following 38 domestic teams, listed by their 2023–24 groups.

- Baroda
- Chhattisgarh
- Haryana
- Hyderabad
- Jammu and Kashmir
- Meghalaya
- Mizoram
- Mumbai
- Assam
- Bihar
- Chandigarh
- Himachal Pradesh
- Kerala
- Odisha
- Services
- Sikkim
- Andhra
- Arunachal Pradesh
- Goa
- Gujarat
- Manipur
- Punjab
- Railways
- Saurashtra
- Bengal
- Jharkhand
- Maharashtra
- Pondicherry
- Rajasthan
- Uttarakhand
- Delhi
- Karnataka
- Madhya Pradesh
- Nagaland
- Tamil Nadu
- Tripura
- Uttar Pradesh
- Vidarbha

== Winners ==
Seasons	Winners	Runners-up	Winning Captain	Captain of Runners-up
2006/07	Tamil Nadu	Punjab	Dinesh Kartik	Pankaj Dharmani
2009/10	Maharashtra	Hyderabad	Rohit Motwani	Amol Shinde
2010/11	Bengal	Madhya Pradesh	Manoj Tiwary	Mohnish Mishra
2011/12	Baroda	Punjab	Pinal Shah	Harbhajan Singh
2012/13	Gujarat	Punjab	Parthiv Patel	Mandeep Singh
2013/14	Baroda	Uttar Pradesh	Aditya Waghmode	Akshdeep Nath
2014/15	Gujarat	Punjab	Manpreet Juneja	Gurkeerat Singh
2015/16	Uttar Pradesh	Baroda	Suresh Raina	Irfan Pathan
2016/17	East Zone	Central Zone	Manoj Tiwary	Naman Ojha
2017/18	Delhi	Rajasthan	Pradeep Sangwan	Aniket Choudhary
2018/19	Karnataka	Maharashtra	Manish Pandey	Rahul Tripathi
2019/20	Karnataka	Tamil Nadu	Manish Pandey	Dinesh Karthik
2020/21	Tamil Nadu	Baroda	Dinesh Karthik	Kedar Devdhar
2021/22	Tamil Nadu	Karnataka	Vijay Shankar	Manish Pandey
2022/23	Mumbai	Himachal Pradesh	Ajinkya Rahane	Rishi Dhawan
2023/24	Punjab	Baroda	Mandeep Singh	Krunal Pandya
2024/25	Mumbai	Madhya Pradesh	Shreyas Iyer	Rajat Patidar
2025/26	Jharkhand	Haryana	Ishan Kishan	Ankit Kumar

=== Finals appearances by team ===
Team	Winner	Runner-up	Last Final
Tamil Nadu	3	1	2021/22
Baroda	2	3	2023/24
Karnataka	2	1	2021/22
Gujarat	2	0	2014/15
Mumbai	2	0	2024/25
Punjab	1	4	2023/24
Maharashtra	1	1	2018/19
Uttar Pradesh	1	1	2015/16
Bengal	1	0	2010/11
East Zone	1	0	2016/17
Delhi	1	0	2017/18
Jharkhand	1	0	2025/26
Madhya Pradesh	0	2	2024/25
Hyderabad	0	1	2009/10
Central Zone	0	1	2016/17
Rajasthan	0	1	2017/18
Himachal Pradesh	0	1	2022/23
Haryana	0	1	2025/26

== Tournament records ==
=== Team records ===
Team records
Most Trophy wins	3	Tamil Nadu
Most consecutive wins including league	15	Karnataka
Most consecutive defeats	22	Jammu and Kashmir
Largest margin of victory (by runs)	By 263 runs	Baroda vs Sikkim
Largest margin of victory (by wickets)	By 10 wickets	30 times
Largest margin of victory (by balls remaining)	100 balls	Jharkhand vs Tripura

=== Highest totals ===
Score	By	Against	Venue	Date
349/5	Baroda	Sikkim	Emerald High School Ground, Indore	5 December 2024
275/6	Punjab	Andhra	JSCA International Stadium Complex, Ranchi	17 October 2023
262/3	Jharkhand	Haryana	Maharashtra Cricket Association Stadium, Maharashtra	18 December 2025
258/4	Mumbai	Sikkim	Emerald High School Ground, Indore	21 February 2019
252/4	Gujarat	Manipur	ACA–KDCA Cricket Ground, Mulapadu	2 March 2019

- Source: ESPNcricinfo

=== Lowest totals ===
Score	By	Against	Venue	Date
30	Tripura	Jharkhand	Tata Digwadih Stadium, Dhanbad	20 October 2009
40	Manipur	Punjab	Sawai Mansingh Stadium, Jaipur	18 October 2022
44	Assam	Delhi	Moti Bagh Stadium, Vadodara	6 January 2016
49	Sikkim	Gujarat	Lalabhai Contractor Stadium, Surat	14 November 2019
50	Mizoram	Uttarakhand	Niranjan Shah Stadium, Rajkot	20 October 2022

- Source: ESPNcricinfo

=== Highest Individual score ===
Score	Name	From	Against	Venue	Date
151	Tilak Varma	Hyderabad	Meghalaya	Saurashtra Cricket Association Stadium C, Rajkot	23 November 2024
147	Shreyas Iyer	Mumbai	Sikkim	Emerald High School Ground, Indore	21 February 2019
146*	Puneet Bisht	Meghalaya	Mizoram	Guru Nanak College Ground, Chennai	13 January 2021
137*	Mohammed Azharuddeen	Kerala	Mumbai	Wankhede Stadium, Mumbai	13 January 2021
134	Prithvi Shaw	Mumbai	Assam	Niranjan Shah Stadium, Rajkot	14 October 2022

- Source: ESPNcricinfo

== See also ==
- Deodhar Trophy
- Duleep Trophy
- Irani Cup
- Ranji Trophy
- Vijay Hazare Trophy
