= 2006–07 Syed Mushtaq Ali Trophy =

Indian cricket tournament

- Dates: 3 April 2007 – 21 April 2007
- Administrator(s): BCCI
- Cricket format: T20
- Tournament format(s): Round robin, then knockout
- Champions: Tamil Nadu (1st title)
- Participants: 27
- Matches: 81
- Most runs: Karan Goel (313) (Punjab)
- Most wickets: Jitender Billa (18) (Haryana)

The 2006–07 Syed Mushtaq Ali Trophy was the inaugural edition of the Syed Mushtaq Ali Trophy, which subsequently became an annual Twenty20 tournament in India. It was originally called the Inter State Twenty-20 Tournament and was contested by the 27 Ranji Trophy teams from 3 to 21 April 2007. Tamil Nadu emerged as winners of the tournament.

== Group stage ==
=== Central Zone ===
Team	Pld	W	L	T	NR	Pts	NRR
Railways	4	3	1	0	0	12	0.377
Madhya Pradesh	4	3	1	0	0	12	0.342
Rajasthan	4	3	1	0	0	12	0.303
Uttar Pradesh	4	1	3	0	0	4	-0.152
Vidarbha	4	0	4	0	0	0	-0.846

=== North Zone ===
Team	Pld	W	L	T	NR	Pts	NRR
Punjab (Note: Head-to-head points: Punjab 4, Haryana 0)	5	4	1	0	0	16	0.526
Haryana	5	4	1	0	0	16	2.101
Himachal Pradesh	5	3	2	0	0	12	-0.082
Services (Note: Head-to-head points: Services 4, Delhi 0)	5	2	3	0	0	8	-1.089
Delhi	5	2	3	0	0	8	0.302
Jammu and Kashmir	5	0	5	0	0	0	-1.658

=== South Zone ===
Team	Pld	W	L	T	NR	Pts	NRR
Tamil Nadu	5	5	0	0	0	20	1.022
Karnataka	5	4	1	0	0	16	1.446
Hyderabad (Note: Head-to-head points: Hyderabad 4, Goa 0)	5	2	3	0	0	8	0.879
Goa	5	2	3	0	0	8	-0.375
Andhra (Note: Head-to-head points: Andhra 4, Kerala 0)	5	1	4	0	0	4	-1.470
Kerala	5	1	4	0	0	4	-1.375

=== East Zone ===
Team	Pld	W	L	T	NR	Pts	NRR
Bengal	4	4	0	0	0	16	1.071
Orissa	4	3	1	0	0	12	1.752
Jharkhand	4	2	2	0	0	8	0.448
Tripura	4	1	3	0	0	4	-0.649
Assam	4	0	4	0	0	0	-2.651

=== West Zone ===
Team	Pld	W	L	T	NR	Pts	NRR
Mumbai (Note: Head-to-head points: Mumbai 4, Gujarat 0)	4	3	1	0	0	12	0.928
Gujarat	4	3	1	0	0	12	-0.213
Baroda	4	2	2	0	0	8	0.441
Saurashtra (Note: Head-to-head points: Saurashtra 4, Maharashtra 0)	4	1	3	0	0	4	-0.232
Maharashtra	4	1	3	0	0	4	-0.932

== Super League Stage ==
=== Group A ===
Team	Pld	W	L	T	NR	Pts	NRR
Punjab (Note: Head-to-head points: Punjab 4, Railways 0)	4	3	1	0	0	12	0.859
Railways	4	3	1	0	0	12	0.910
Karnataka (Note: Head-to-head points: Karnataka 4, Gujarat 0)	4	2	2	0	0	8	0.483
Gujarat	4	2	2	0	0	8	-0.527
Orissa	4	0	4	0	0	0	-1.752

=== Group B ===
Team	Pld	W	L	T	NR	Pts	NRR
Tamil Nadu (Note: Head-to-head points: Tamil Nadu 4, Mumbai 0)	4	3	1	0	0	12	0.775
Mumbai	4	3	1	0	0	12	1.315
Bengal	4	2	2	0	0	8	-0.046
Haryana (Note: Head-to-head points: Haryana 4, Madhya Pradesh 0)	4	1	3	0	0	4	-0.823
Madhya Pradesh	4	1	3	0	0	4	-1.197

== Final ==
21 April 2007 (D/N)
Scorecard

Punjab; 134/8 (20 Overs)	v	Tamil Nadu; 135/8 (19.5 Overs)
Karan Goel 26 (19); Ramaswamy Prasanna 2/12 (4 Overs)		Vidyut Sivaramakrishnan 27 (28); Karan Goel 4/13 (3 Overs)

Tamil Nadu won by 2 wickets
Brabourne Stadium, Mumbai
Umpires: Amiesh Saheba and Krishna Hariharan

- Punjab won the toss and elected to bat first.
- Tamil Nadu won the inaugural Syed Mushtaq Ali Trophy.
