= 1980–81 Ranji Trophy =

1980-81 Ranji Trophy
- The Ranji Trophy, which the winners get.
- Administrator: BCCI
- Cricket format: First-class cricket
- Tournament format(s): League and knockout
- Champions: Bombay (28th title)
- Participants: 24
- Most runs: Ghulam Parkar (Bombay) (732)
- Most wickets: Madan Lal (Delhi) (33)

The 1980–81 Ranji Trophy was the 47th season of the Ranji Trophy. Bombay won the title defeating Delhi in the final.

== Highlights ==
- In the quarterfinal against Railways, Madan Lal of Delhi scored 140 and 100 and took 3/87 and 5/56

== Group stage ==
=== North Zone ===
Team	Pld	W	L	D	T	NR	Pts	Q
Haryana	4	2	0	2	0	0	26	1.862
Delhi	4	1	0	3	0	0	21	1.361
Services	4	1	0	3	0	0	20	0.989
Punjab	4	1	1	2	0	0	14	0.724
Jammu and Kashmir	4	0	4	0	0	0	0	0.585

=== Central Zone ===
Team	Pld	W	L	D	T	NR	Pts	Q
Uttar Pradesh	4	2	0	2	0	0	27	1.650
Railways	4	2	0	2	0	0	24	1.264
Rajasthan	4	1	0	3	0	0	19	1.008
Madhya Pradesh	4	0	2	2	0	0	6	0.803
Vidarbha	4	0	3	1	0	0	5	0.598

=== South Zone ===
Team	Pld	W	L	D	T	NR	Pts	Q
Hyderabad	4	2	0	2	0	0	27	1.373
Tamil Nadu	4	2	0	2	0	0	26	2.186
Karnataka	4	1	0	3	0	0	20	1.266
Andhra	4	0	2	2	0	0	9	0.614
Kerala	4	0	3	1	0	0	3	0.518

=== West Zone ===
Team	Pld	W	L	D	T	NR	Pts	Q
Saurashtra	4	2	0	2	0	0	24	1.667
Bombay	4	1	0	3	0	0	24	1.667
Baroda	4	1	0	3	0	0	19	0.980
Maharashtra	4	0	1	3	0	0	11	0.660
Gujarat	4	0	3	1	0	0	3	0.635

=== East Zone ===
Team	Pld	W	L	D	T	NR	Pts	Q
Bengal	3	1	0	2	0	0	19	2.510
Bihar	3	1	0	2	0	0	16	0.919
Orissa	3	0	0	3	0	0	11	0.808
Assam	3	0	2	1	0	0	3	0.422

== Knockout stage ==
Pre-Quarter-finals
30 Dec 1980 — Kanpur
Uttar Pradesh	530/5d & 123/3d
Bengal	367 & 30/0
30 Dec 1980 — Delhi
Railways	189 & 230/8
Bihar	331 & 86

Quarter-finals
13 Feb 1981 — Madras
Tamil Nadu	324 & 275/5
Haryana	316 & 261
13 Feb 1981 — Kanpur
Uttar Pradesh	193 & 255/4
Bombay	441 & 339/6d
13 Feb 1981 — Delhi
Railways	369 & 93
Delhi	335 & 216
13 Feb 1981 — Hyderabad
Hyderabad	115 & 232
Saurashtra	294 & 207

Semi-finals
28 Feb 1981 — Madras
Tamil Nadu	287 & 241/6
Bombay	415 & 369/4d
27 Feb 1981 — Delhi
Delhi	197 & 162/2
Saurashtra	247 & 108

Finals
20 Mar 1981 — Bombay
Bombay	517
Delhi	251 & 220

=== Final ===
20–23 March 1981
Scorecard

Delhi	v	Bombay (H)
251 (112.4 overs); Rakesh Shukla 120; Balwinder Sandhu 6/72		517 (161 overs); Ghulam Parkar 121, Ashok Mankad 265; Madan Lal 8/118
220 (92.5 overs); Madan Lal 76; Suru Nayak 6/65

Bombay won by an innings and 46 runs
Wankhede Stadium, Bombay
Umpires: Mohammad Ghouse, M. G. Subramaniam

- Delhi won the toss and decided to bat

== Scorecards and averages ==
- CricketArchive
