= ACA Women's Cricket Academy Ground =

Stadium in India

- Interactive map of ACA Women's Cricket Academy Ground
- Full name: Andhra Cricket Association Women's Cricket Academy Ground
- Location: Guntur, Andhra Pradesh
- Coordinates: 16.322093°N 80.417500°E
- Owner: Andhra Cricket Association
- Operator: Andhra Cricket Association
- Capacity: 5,000

Construction
- Groundbreaking: 2011
- Opened: 2011

Tenant
- India women's national cricket team

Website
- CricketArchive

Andhra Cricket Association Women's Cricket Academy Ground is a multi purpose stadium in Guntur, Andhra Pradesh. The ground is mainly used for organizing matches of football, cricket and other sports. The ground is home of India women's national cricket team and Women's Cricket Academy is located. The ground is yet to hosted international match but has many women's domestic mathes.
