= Rajat Bhatia =

Indian cricketer

Personal information
- Born: 22 October 1979 (age 47); Delhi, India
- Batting: Right-handed
- Bowling: Right arm medium-fast
- Role: All-rounder

Domestic team information
- Years: Team
- 1999/00–2005/06: Tamil Nadu
- 2005/06–2015: Delhi
- 2008–2010: Delhi Daredevils
- 2011–2013: Kolkata Knight Riders
- 2014–2015: Rajasthan Royals
- 2016–2017: Rising Pune Supergiants (squad no. 29)
- 2018–2019: Uttarakhand

Career statistics
| Competition | FC | LA | T20 |
|---|---|---|---|
| Matches | 112 | 119 | 146 |
| Runs scored | 6,482 | 3,038 | 1,251 |
| Batting average | 49.10 | 41.05 | 21.56 |
| 100s/50s | 17/30 | 3/19 | 1/1 |
| Top score | 212* | 106* | 107* |
| Balls bowled | 9,989 | 3,931 | 2,520 |
| Wickets | 137 | 93 | 111 |
| Bowling average | 27.97 | 31.66 | 27.20 |
| 5 wickets in innings | 1 | 1 | 0 |
| 10 wickets in match | 0 | 0 | 0 |
| Best bowling | 5/29 | 5/17 | 4/15 |
| Catches/stumpings | 41/– | 45/– | 46/– |
- Source: ESPNcricinfo, 29 July 2020

Rajat Bhatia (born 22 October 1979) is an Indian former professional cricketer. He played for a number of teams, such as Tamil Nadu, Delhi, Delhi Daredevils, Kolkata Knight Riders and Rising Pune Supergiants. He was a part of the MRF Pace Foundation when he was young. He led the Uttarakhand cricket team in 2018 Ranji Trophy and Vijay Hazare Trophy.

In July 2020, Bhatia announced his retirement from all forms of cricket.

== Career ==
Bhatia made his first-class and list A debuts for Tamil Nadu against Sinhalese Sports Club at Colombo in 2000. He first played for Tamil Nadu, but later returned to his home state side Delhi. In the 2007–08 Ranji Trophy season, he contributed much to Delhi's title win with 512 runs in 7 matches. The same year, he made his Twenty20 debut for Delhi against Himachal Pradesh in the Inter-State T20 Championship. He played for Delhi Daredevils in the inaugural Indian Premier League.

In 2011, he was bought by the Kolkata Knight Riders in the IPL before being acquired by Rajasthan Royals at the 2014 IPL auction, later going on to play for Rising Pune Supergiants. His last appearance in the IPL was in 2017.

In November 2015, Bhatia was released by Delhi after 81 matches in which he scored 4,666 runs and took 96 wickets. He joined Rajasthan.

Ahead of the 2018–19 Ranji Trophy, he transferred from Rajasthan to Uttarakhand. He was the leading run-scorer for the side in the group-stage of the 2018–19 Ranji Trophy, with 700 runs in eight matches.
