= Sadar Bazar Stadium =

Multi purpose stadium in Agra, India

Eklavya Sports Stadium
- Interactive map of Eklavya Sports Stadium
- Full name: Eklavya Sports Stadium
- Former names: Sadar Bazar Sports Stadium
- Location: Agra, India
- Coordinates: 27.16077°N 78.00938°E
- Capacity: 5,000

Construction
- Groundbreaking: 1934
- Opened: 1934
- Renovated: 1993

Tenants
- Uttar Pradesh cricket team (1966-1987)

Website
- Cricinfo

Eklavya Sports Stadium is a multi purpose stadium located in Agra, Uttar Pradesh. The ground is mainly used for organizing matches of football, cricket and other sports. The stadium has hosted 17 Ranji Trophy match in 1934 when United Provinces cricket team played against Delhi cricket team as the match saw Delhi all out for 37 runs in the first innings. The hosted 16 more matches from 1966 to 1987 but since then the stadium hasn't hosted any cricket matches.
