= 1983–84 Ranji Trophy =

1983-84 Ranji Trophy
- The Ranji Trophy, which the winners get.
- Administrator: BCCI
- Cricket format: First-class cricket
- Tournament format(s): League and knockout
- Champions: Bombay (29th title)
- Participants: 24
- Most runs: Surinder Khanna (Delhi) (685)
- Most wickets: Rajinder Goel (Haryana) (48)

The 1983–84 Ranji Trophy was the 50th season of the Ranji Trophy. Mumbai won the final against Delhi on first innings lead, thanks mainly to a double century by Sunil Gavaskar.

== Highlights ==
- Dilip Vengsarkar of Bombay scored hundreds in the quarter-final, semifinal and the final.
- Kiran More of Baroda scored a career-best 181* in the quarter-final against Uttar Pradesh and added a Ranji trophy record 145 for the last wicket with Vasudev Patel.
- Rajinder Goel took 5/7 and 5/18 for Haryana v Jammu and Kashmir.

== Group stage ==
=== Central Zone ===
Team	Pld	W	L	D	T	NR	Pts	Q
Uttar Pradesh	4	2	0	2	0	0	70	2.146
Rajasthan	4	1	1	2	0	0	49	1.145
Vidarbha	4	1	1	2	0	0	43	0.752
Railways	4	0	2	2	0	0	38	0.742
Madhya Pradesh	4	0	0	4	0	0	30	1.006

=== South Zone ===
Team	Pld	W	L	D	T	NR	Pts	Q
Tamil Nadu	4	3	0	1	0	0	93	2.037
Hyderabad	4	2	1	1	0	0	79	1.454
Karnataka	4	2	0	2	0	0	73	1.803
Andhra	4	1	3	0	0	0	54	0.665
Kerala	4	0	4	0	0	0	16	0.266

=== West Zone ===
Team	Pld	W	L	D	T	NR	Pts	Q
Bombay	4	3	0	1	0	0	100	1.859
Baroda	4	0	1	3	0	0	42	1.096
Gujarat	4	0	0	4	0	0	40	0.879
Saurashtra	4	0	1	3	0	0	36	0.677
Maharashtra	4	0	1	3	0	0	34	0.761

=== North Zone ===
Team	Pld	W	L	D	T	NR	Pts	Q
Haryana	4	3	0	1	0	0	94	2.099
Delhi	4	3	0	1	0	0	90	2.113
Punjab	4	1	2	1	0	0	44	1.028
Services	4	0	2	2	0	0	27	0.776
Jammu and Kashmir	4	0	3	1	0	0	17	0.246

=== East Zone ===
Team	Pld	W	L	D	T	NR	Pts	Q
Bengal	3	1	0	2	0	0	50	4.104
Orissa	3	1	0	2	0	0	43	0.881
Bihar	3	1	0	2	0	0	42	1.584
Assam	3	0	3	0	0	0	6	0.168

== Knockout stage ==
Pre-Quarter-finals
22 Jan 1984 — Rourkela
Orissa	438 & 37/4
Rajasthan	502 & 213/2d
22 Jan 1984 — Delhi
Delhi	400 & 141/2
Bengal	298 & 242

Quarter-finals
3 Mar 1984 — Jaipur
Rajasthan	370 & 276/7d
Bombay	401 & 193/4
3 Mar 1984 — Chandigarh
Haryana	363 & 251
Hyderabad	240 & 216
3 Mar 1984 — Madras
Tamil Nadu	353 & 255/5
Delhi	477
3 Mar 1984 — Baroda
Baroda	483
Uttar Pradesh	238 & 201

Semi-finals
17 Mar 1984 — Bombay
Bombay	552 & 264/6d
Haryana	377 & 113/1
18 Mar 1984 — Delhi
Delhi	349 & 385/7d
Baroda	199 & 94

Finals
30 Mar 1984 — Bombay
Bombay	625 & 245/9d
Delhi	333 & 266/4

=== Final ===
30 March - 3 April 1984
Scorecard

Bombay (H)	v	Delhi
625 (200 overs); Dilip Vengsarkar 123, Sunil Gavaskar 206; Maninder Singh 4/172		333 (92.4 overs); Kirti Azad 106; Raju Kulkarni 3/81
245 (78.5 overs); Sandip Patil 72; Madan Lal 3/35		266/4 (73 overs); Manoj Prabhakar 122, Mohinder Amarnath 103*; Raju Kulkarni 1/18

Bombay won on first innings lead
Wankhede Stadium, Bombay
Umpires: Subrata Banerjee, V. K. Ramaswamy

- Delhi won the toss and decided to field

== Scorecards and averages ==
- CricketArchive
