= 1979–80 Ranji Trophy =

1979-80 Ranji Trophy
- The Ranji Trophy, which the winners get.
- Administrator: BCCI
- Cricket format: First-class cricket
- Tournament format(s): League and knockout
- Champions: Delhi (2nd title)
- Participants: 24
- Most runs: Dilip Vengsarkar (Bombay) (763)
- Most wickets: Rajinder Goel (Haryana) (44)

The 1979–80 Ranji Trophy was the 46th season of the Ranji Trophy. Delhi retained the title defeating Bombay.

== Group stage ==
=== North Zone ===
Team	Pld	W	L	D	T	NR	Pts	Q
Delhi	4	3	0	1	0	0	31	2.393
Haryana	4	1	1	2	0	0	19	1.506
Punjab	4	1	0	3	0	0	17	1.124
Services	4	1	1	2	0	0	16	1.039
Jammu and Kashmir	4	0	4	0	0	0	0	0.216

=== South Zone ===
Team	Pld	W	L	D	T	NR	Pts	Q
Hyderabad	4	2	0	2	0	0	25	1.307
Karnataka	4	0	0	4	0	0	21	1.350
Tamil Nadu	4	1	0	3	0	0	17	1.199
Andhra	4	0	1	3	0	0	8	0.839
Kerala	4	0	2	2	0	0	8	0.530

=== West Zone ===
Team	Pld	W	L	D	T	NR	Pts	Q
Bombay	4	1	0	3	0	0	24	2.148
Maharashtra	4	1	0	3	0	0	19	0.944
Baroda	4	0	0	4	0	0	16	0.816
Saurashtra	4	0	1	3	0	0	13	0.799
Gujarat	4	0	1	3	0	0	9	0.739

=== Central Zone ===
Team	Pld	W	L	D	T	NR	Pts	Q
Rajasthan	4	2	0	2	0	0	24	1.040
Uttar Pradesh	4	0	0	4	0	0	18	1.310
Madhya Pradesh	4	0	0	4	0	0	16	0.950
Railways	4	0	1	3	0	0	13	1.093
Vidarbha	4	0	1	3	0	0	9	0.691

=== East Zone ===
Team	Pld	W	L	D	T	NR	Pts	Q
Bengal	3	1	0	2	0	0	18	2.270
Bihar	3	1	0	2	0	0	17	1.783
Orissa	3	1	0	2	0	0	14	0.921
Assam	3	0	3	0	0	0	0	0.292

== Knockout stage ==
Pre-Quarter-finals
29 Feb 1980 — Calcutta
Bengal (T)	333/6
Hyderabad	245/5
29 Feb 1980 — Kanpur
Uttar Pradesh	265 & 117
Bombay	226 & 157/3

Quarter-finals
14 Mar 1980 — Calcutta
Bengal	156 & 354
Delhi	337 & 239/7d
14 Mar 1980 — Jaipur
Rajasthan	239 & 66/2
Maharashtra	352 & 254/6d
14 Mar 1980 — Bangalore
Karnataka	320 & 167
Haryana	232 & 258/5d
14 Mar 1980 — Jamshedpur
Bihar	190 & 425/7d
Bombay	437 & 53/1

Semi-finals
28 Mar 1980 — Delhi
Delhi	229 & 167
Maharashtra	223 & 59
28 Mar 1980 — Rohtak
Haryana	68 & 111
Bombay	143 & 150

Finals
11 Apr 1980 — Delhi
Delhi	547 & 177
Bombay	245 & 239

(T) - Advanced to next round by spin of coin.

=== Final ===
11–16 April 1980
Scorecard

Delhi (H)	v	Bombay
547 (202.4 overs); Mohinder Amarnath 191, Kirti Azad 102; Padmakar Shivalkar 5/125		245 (93 overs); Dilip Vengsarkar 81; Kirti Azad 3/55
177 (68.1 overs); Surinder Khanna 44; Ravi Shastri 6/61		239 (97.2 overs); Sunil Gavaskar 93; Bishan Bedi 5/60

Delhi won by 240 runs
Feroz Shah Kotla, Delhi
Umpires: Bhairab Ganguli and V. Vikramraju

- Delhi won the toss and decided to bat

== Scorecards and averages ==
- CricketArchive
