= Gurajada Kalakshetram, Visakhapatnam =

Cultural center and auditorium in Visakhapatnam

Gurajada Kalakshetram
- Interactive map of Gurajada Kalakshetram
- Address: Siripuram; Visakhapatnam; India
- Coordinates: 17.720325°N 83.318467°E
- Owner: Visakhapatnam Metropolitan Region Development Authority
- Capacity: 2,300

Construction
- Opened: 1986

Gurajada Kalakshetram is a cultural center and auditorium in Visakhapatnam in the Indian state of Andhra Pradesh.

== History ==
In 1986 Gurajada Kalakshetram is set up with 3,000 capacity. After renovation in 2018 the capacity of this auditorium is set up with 2,300.

== About ==
this auditorium total capacity is 2,300 and area is 3000 square meters, and total project cost is ₹ 980 lakhs. there are many musical, cultural film and other events are conducted in this auditorium.
