= Port Trust Diamond Jubilee Stadium =

Stadium in Visakhapatnam, India

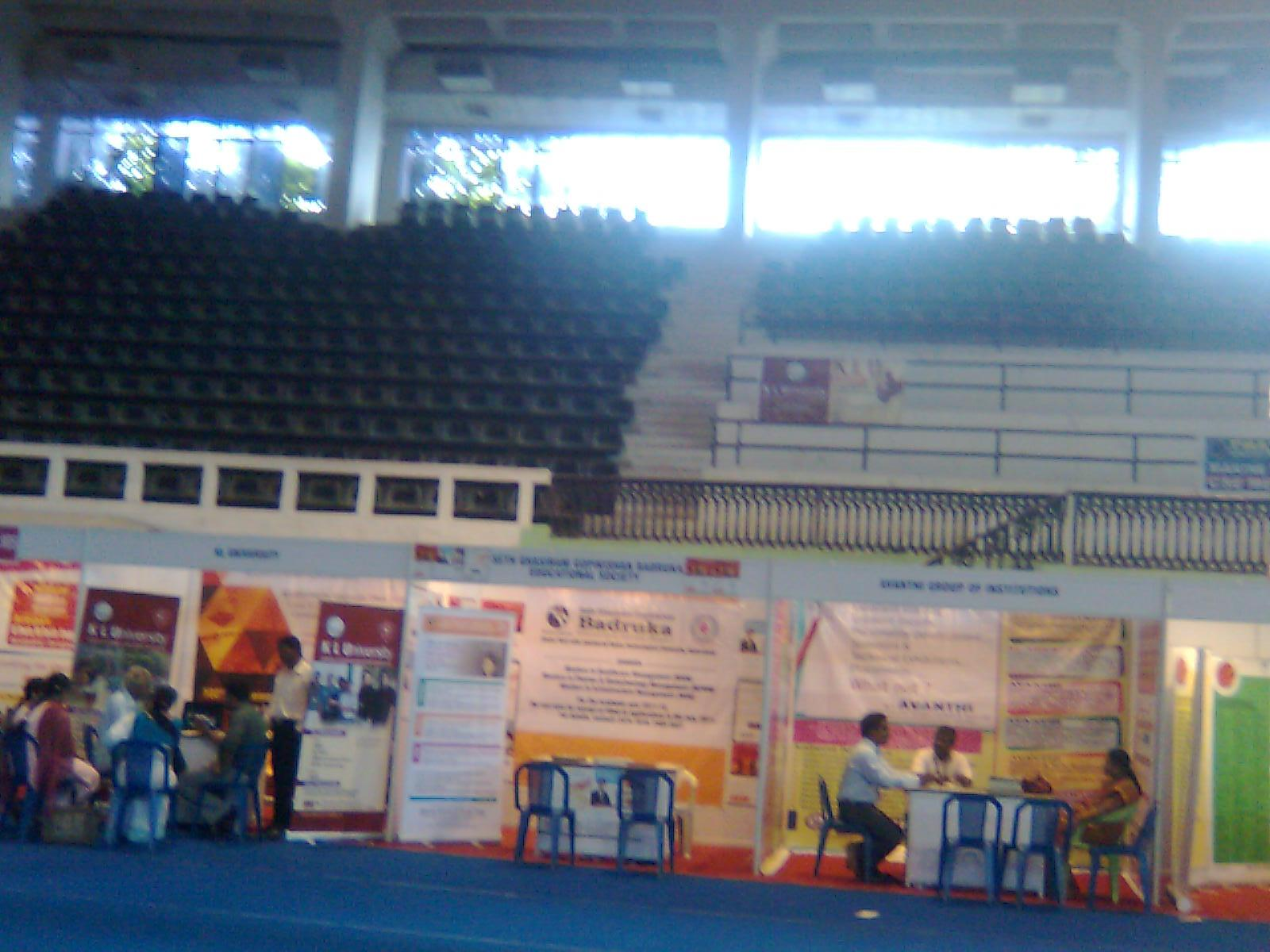
- Interactive map of Port Trust Diamond Jubilee Stadium
- Full name: Port Trust Diamond Jubilee Stadium
- Location: Visakhapatnam, Andhra Pradesh, India
- Coordinates: 17.74244°N 83.30261°E
- Owner: Visakhapatnam Port Trust
- Operator: Visakhapatnam Port Trust
- Capacity: 5,000

Construction
- Groundbreaking: 1993
- Opened: 1993

Website
- Cricinfo

Port Trust Diamond Jubilee Stadium is a multi-purpose stadium in Visakhapatnam, India. This picturesque stadium of Visakhapatnam is situated amidst scenic hills and has hosted 18 under-19s matches . The stadium has a two-tier architecture and designed in such a way that view of the match in action is not obstructed regardless of the seating location. It is currently used mainly for cricket matches. The stadium was built in 2003 and has a capacity of 5,000 seats.

The ground is mainly used for organizing matches of football, cricket and other sports. The stadium has hosted a Ranji Trophy match in 1993 when Andhra cricket team played against Goa cricket team. The ground hosted a first-class matches when India A cricket team played against New Zealand A cricket team. The stadium also hosted 12 List A matches in 1993 when Andhra cricket team played against Goa cricket team.

The stadium has also hosted Under-19s cricket matches of Afro-Asia Under-19 Cup in 2005 in 2005when India national under-19 cricket team played against Bangladesh national under-19 cricket team.

Membership - Use of Port stadiums for sporting activities requires membership (gate pass card). The membership fee is 300 INR per year. One can register for the membership on the second Saturday of any month directly in the stadium from 8:00 - 10:00 am.
