= Sandip Maniar =

Indian cricketer (born 1977)

Sandip Manubhai Maniar
Personal information
- Born: 28 December 1977 (age 48); Sihor, Gujarat
- Batting: Right-handed
- Bowling: Right-arm medium
- Source: Cricinfo, 26 May 2018

Sandip Maniar (born 28 December 1977) is an Indian cricketer. He played the different formats of First-class cricket, List A cricket and T20 matches for the Saurashtra cricket team from 2002 to 2013.
