= Karan Goel =

Indian cricketer (born 1986)

Personal information
- Full name: Karan Goel
- Born: 24 December 1986 (age 39); Ludhiana, Punjab
- Batting: Left-handed
- Bowling: Right-arm medium

Domestic team information
- Years: Team
- 2005-2013: Punjab
- 2008-2010: Kings XI Punjab

Career statistics
Competition	FC	LA	T20
Matches	41	32	44
Runs scored	1,990	1,238	679
Batting average	29.26	45.85	19.97
100s/50s	3/10	3/8	0/3
Top score	167	122	82
Balls bowled	1,178	396	193
Wickets	13	8	10
Bowling average	58.76	40.62	22.60
5 wickets in innings	0	0	0
10 wickets in match	0	0	0
Best bowling	4/96	3/20	4/13
Catches/stumpings	22/–	10/–	13/–
- Source: ESPNcricinfo, 1 March 2024

Karan Goel is a cricket player from Punjab who has represented Punjab in Ranji Trophy matches. Born in Ludhiana, Punjab (India), Karan Goel made his first-class debut with his state team during the 2005-06 Ranji Trophy season. He was offered an IPL contract by the Kings XI Punjab in 2008, for whom he played the next two seasons.

However, he was not consistent and did not play again in the cash-rich league. He did not play domestic cricket after the 2012–13 season.
