= Aadudam Andhra =

Indian government sports initiative

Aadudam Andhra (transl. 'Andhra, let's play') was an initiative of the Andhra Pradesh government to promote sports. It will be held from December 26, 2023, to February 10, 2024.

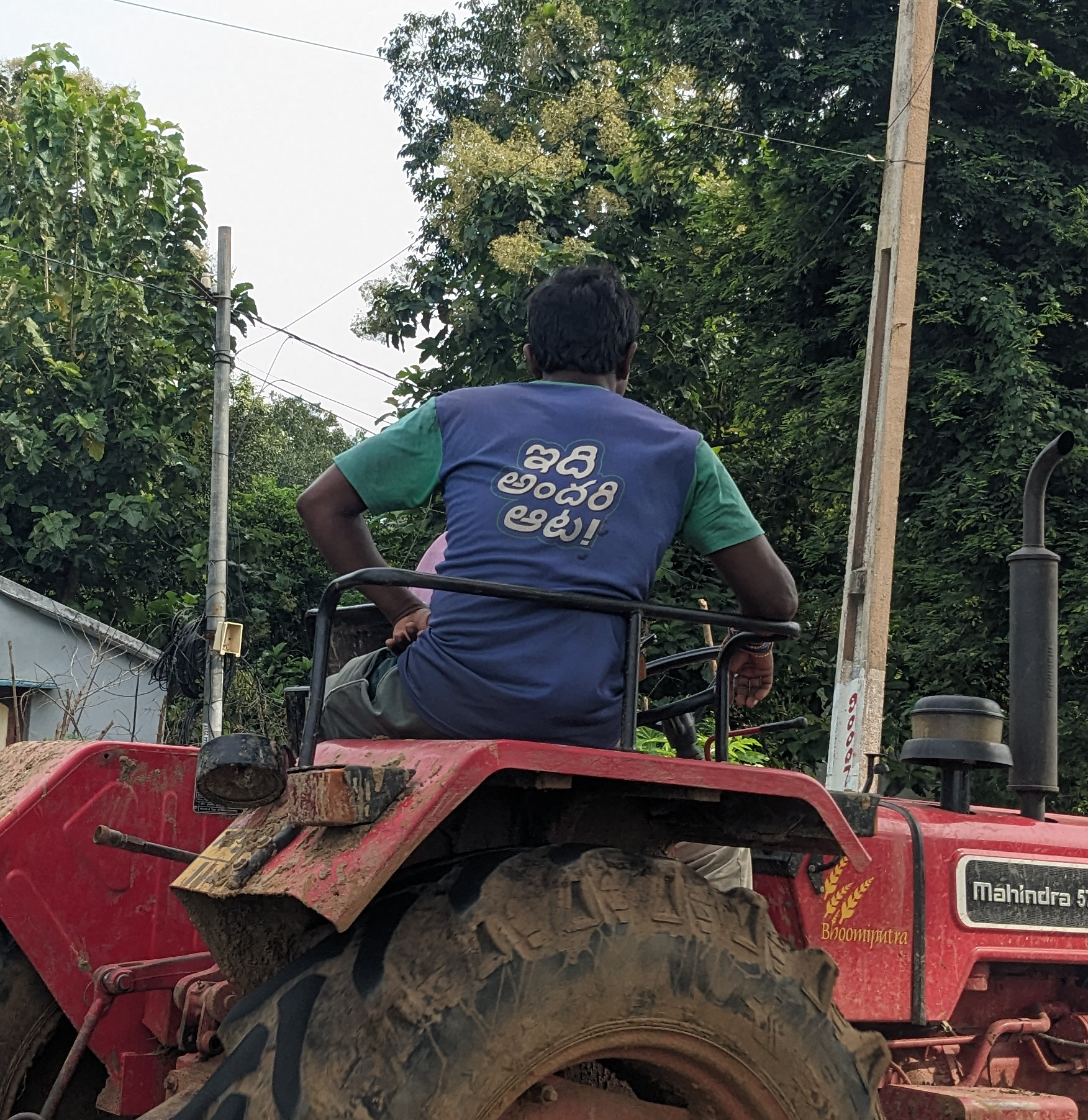
Man wearing an Aadudam Andhra t-shirt which says "This is everyones game"

Cricket, basketball, volleyball, kabaddi, kho-kho and badminton doubles will be included along with other traditional Indian games, with yoga, tennikoit, and a 3 km marathon also being played non-competitively. Competition will be held at the village/ward secretariat, mandal, constituency, district and state levels, and Visakhapatnam hosting the final stage of the event.

== Cash prizes ==
At the constituency level, winning teams will get ₹35,000 (US$410), while second- and third-placed teams will respectively earn ₹15,000 (US$180) and ₹5,000 (US$59).

At the district-level, the top-three teams will respectively earn ₹60,000 (US$710), ₹30,000 (US$350) and ₹10,000 (US$120), while at the state-level, they will earn ₹5 lakh (US$5,900), ₹3 lakh (US$3,500) and ₹2 lakh (US$2,400) respectively.

== See also ==
- Khelo India
