= Shoaib Shaikh =

Indian cricketer (born 1987)

Personal information
- Full name: Shoaib Shaikh
- Born: 18 January 1987 (age 39); Bombay, Maharashtra, India
- Batting: Right-handed
- Bowling: Right-arm medium
- Role: Batsman

Domestic team information
- Years: Team
- 2009: Kolkata Knight Riders
- 2010–present: Mumbai

Career statistics
Competition	List A	T20
Matches	12	15
Runs scored	425	368
Batting average	35.41	28.30
100s/50s	0/3	1/2
Top score	83	110
Balls bowled	78	72
Wickets	1	4
Bowling average	53.00	26.50
5 wickets in innings	0	0
10 wickets in match	0	0
Best bowling	1/6	3/27
Catches/stumpings	2/–	4/–
- Source: ESPNcricinfo, 27 March 2015

Shoyab Shaikh (born 18 January 1987) is an Indian cricketer who plays for Mumbai cricket team in List A and Twenty20 formats. He is a right-handed batsman and occasional right-arm off break bowler. He had played for Mumbai at age-group levels such as Under-14, Under-16, Under-17, Under-19 and Under-22.

Shaikh was signed up by Kolkata Knight Riders for the 2009 Indian Premier League without having played any senior-level cricket. He made his senior cricket debut in that tournament against the Deccan Chargers, but did not get to bat or bowl. He made his List A debut for Mumbai in 2012.
