= ACA International Cricket Stadium =

Cricket Stadium in Andhra Pradesh, India

- Mangalagiri Stadium
- Interactive map of ACA International Cricket Stadium
- Location: Mangalagiri, Amaravati–APCR, Andhra Pradesh, India
- Country: India
- Coordinates: 16.437°N 80.553°E
- Establishment: 2016; 10 years ago
- Capacity: 34,000
- Owner: Sports Authority of Andhra Pradesh
- Operator: Andhra Cricket Association
- Tenants: Andhra cricket team

ACA International Cricket Stadium (stands for Andhra Cricket Association International Cricket Stadium) is a cricket stadium in Mangalagiri, Andhra Pradesh Capital Region. It is situated in Mangalagiri, Guntur district of the Indian state of Andhra Pradesh nearly 10 mi (16 km) from Guntur, 19 miles (31 km) from Tenali and 8 mi (13 km) from Pandit Nehru bus station.

== History ==
In 2000, Andhra Cricket Association wanted to construct an international cricket stadium in Vijayawada, but due to lack of area this stadium plan was moved to Mangalagiri. Although the cricket ground has been constructed, the stadium construction along with audience gallery did not start.

In 2013, Andhra Cricket Association proposed construction of the central zone stadium in Mangalagiri as part of zonal wise academies with North and South zone academies in Vizianagaram and Kadapa respectively. The ACA tried to start the construction and an indoor stadium has been built next to the cricket ground for players to practice . But the main stadium construction was quickly put on hold at the foundation level, because of architectural issues. The work of the stadium resumed from 2015.

Anurag Thakur (then BCCI Chief), Galla Jayadev (Member of Parliament), Kesineni Srinivas (Member of Parliament), and Devineni Uma Maheswara Rao inaugurated the stadium at A.P Capital of Amaravati on 30 May 2016, with the construction company IVRCL Limited winning the rights for the project, worth ₹51.04 crore (US$5.3 million). It is owned by Andhra Cricket Association. The stadium is spread over an area of 24 acres (9.7 ha) with a seating capacity of 34,000.

VVS Laxman, the former Indian batsman, inaugurated the Central Zone Academy of Andhra Cricket Association in June 2013. The stadium will include a club house and an indoor cricket academy. The Board of Control for Cricket in India made Andhra Cricket Association the headquarters of the Indian women's cricket team.

== See also ==
- Indira Gandhi Stadium, Vijayawada
- ACA–KDCA Cricket Ground
