= Delhi cricket team =

Indian domestic cricket team

Personnel
- Captain: Ayush Badoni (FC); Rishabh Pant (LA); Ayush Badoni (T20)
- Coach: Sarandeep Singh
- Owner: Delhi & District Cricket Association

Team information
- Founded: 1876
- Home ground: Arun Jaitley Stadium
- Capacity: 55,000

History
- First-class debut: United Provinces in 1934 at Sadar Bazar Stadium, Agra
- Ranji Trophy wins: 7
- Irani Cup wins: 2
- Wills Trophy wins: 4
- Vijay Hazare Trophy wins: 1
- Syed Mushtaq Ali Trophy wins: 1
- Official website: DDCA

The Delhi cricket team is a first-class cricket team based in Delhi, run by the Delhi & District Cricket Association. It plays in the Ranji Trophy, India's first-class competition, as well as in the limited-overs competition, the Vijay Hazare Trophy and Syed Mushtaq Ali Trophy. They have won the Ranji Trophy seven times and have been runners-up eight. Their latest title in 2007-08 came after 16 years. The team's home ground is Arun Jaitley Stadium.

== Competition history ==
Delhi have made a strong performance in the Ranji Trophy throughout its history. Three of its five wins came in the 1980s and the remainder were in the late 1970s, a period marked by the dominance of a famous Mumbai team. This formed a golden period for Delhi between 1978 and 1987: it was in the finals for all but one of those years (winning 4, runner-up in 4).

Its six appearances in the Irani Trophy showed mixed results, losing to the Rest of India side four times and winning twice.

They have only two titles in limited overs cricket. They won the Vijay Hazare Trophy in 2012-13 under Rajat Bhatia. They won the Syed Mushtaq Ali Trophy under Pradeep Sangwan.

== Honours ==
- Ranji Trophy
  - Winners (7): 1978–79, 1979–80, 1981–82, 1985–86, 1988–89, 1991–92, 2007–08
  - Runners-up (8): 1976–77, 1980–81, 1983–84, 1984–85, 1986–87, 1989–90, 1996–97, 2017–18
- Irani Cup
  - Winners: 1980–81, 1989–90
- Wills Trophy
  - Winners (4): 1978–79, 1986–87, 1988–89, 1992–93
  - Runners-up (2): 1982–83, 1985–86, 1989–90
- Vijay Hazare Trophy
  - Winners: 2012-13
  - Runners-up (2): 2015-16, 2018-19
- Syed Mushtaq Ali Trophy
  - Winners: 2017-18

== Notable players ==
Players from Delhi who have played Test cricket for India, along with year of Test debut:

- Prakash Bhandari (1955)
- Man Sood (1960)
- Mansoor Ali Khan Pataudi (Nawab of Pataudi) (1961)
- Rajinder Pal (1964)
- Ramesh Saxena (1967)
- Ashok Gandotra (1969)
- Madan Lal (1974)
- Surinder Amarnath (1976)
- Kirti Azad (1981)
- Rakesh Shukla (1982)
- Maninder Singh (1982)
- Manoj Prabhakar (1984)
- Raman Lamba (1987)
- Ajay Sharma (1988)
- Sanjeev Sharma (1988)
- Vivek Razdan (1989)
- Atul Wassan (1990)
- Ashish Nehra (1999)
- Robin Singh, Jr. (1999)
- Nikhil Chopra (2000)
- Vijay Dahiya (2000)
- Rahul Sanghvi (2001)
- Virender Sehwag (2001)
- Aakash Chopra (2003)
- Gautam Gambhir (2004)
- Ishant Sharma (2007)
- Virat Kohli (2011)
- Shikhar Dhawan (2013)
- Rishabh Pant (2018)
- Navdeep Saini (2021)
- Harshit Rana (2024)

Players from Delhi who have played ODI but not Test cricket for India, along with year of ODI debut:

- Surinder Khanna (1979)
- Amit Bhandari (2000)
- Nitish Rana (2021)
- Prince Yadav (2026)

Players from Delhi who have played T20I but not ODI or Test cricket for India, along with year of T20I debut:

- Parvinder Awana (2012)
- Pawan Negi (2016)
- Mayank Yadav (2023)

Cricketers from other state teams who also played for Delhi, and played Test cricket for India, along with year of Test debut:

- Bishan Singh Bedi (1966)
- Chetan Chauhan (1969)
- Mohinder Amarnath (1969)
- Arun Lal (1982)

Prominent cricketers at the domestic level:

- Rajinder Goel
- Krishnan Bhaskar Pillai
- Arun Khurana
- Mithun Manhas
- Rajat Bhatia
- Unmukt Chand

== Current squad ==
Players with international caps are listed in bold.

Name	Birth date	Batting style	Bowling style	Notes
Batters
Priyansh Arya	18 January 2001 (age 25)	Left-handed	Right-arm off break	Plays for **Punjab Kings** in IPL
Ayush Doseja	30 August 2002 (age 24)	Left-handed	Right-arm off break	
Yash Dhull	11 November 2002 (age 24)	Right-handed	Right-arm off break	
**Nitish Rana**	27 December 1993 (age 32)	Left-handed	Right-arm off break	
Sanat Sangwan	3 September 2000 (age 26)	Left-handed	Right-arm leg break	
Sarthak Ranjan	25 September 1996 (age 30)	Right-handed	Right-arm leg break	Plays for **Kolkata Knight Riders** in IPL
Himmat Singh	8 November 1996 (age 30)	Right-handed	Right-arm off break	
**Virat Kohli**	5 November 1988 (age 38)	Right-handed	Right-arm medium	Plays for **Royal Challengers Bangalore** in **IPL**
All-rounders
Ayush Badoni	3 December 1999 (age 26)	Right-handed	Right-arm off break	**First-class and Twenty20 Captain**; Plays for **Lucknow Super Giants** in IPL
Sumit Mathur	22 November 1997 (age 28)	Left-handed	Slow left-arm orthodox	
Dev Lakra	27 June 2003 (age 23)	Right-handed	Right-arm medium	
Wicket-keepers
Anuj Rawat	17 October 1999 (age 27)	Left-handed		Plays for **Gujarat Titans** in IPL
Tejasvi Dahiya	18 April 2002 (age 24)	Right-handed		Plays for **Kolkata Knight Riders** in IPL
**Rishabh Pant**	4 October 1997 (age 29)	Left-handed		**List A Captain**; Plays for **Lucknow Super Giants** in IPL
Spin bowlers
Hrithik Shokeen	14 August 2000 (age 26)	Right-handed	Right-arm off break	
Suyash Sharma	15 May 2003 (age 23)	Right-handed	Right-arm leg break	
Digvesh Rathi	15 December 1999 (age 26)	Right-handed	Right-arm leg break	Plays for **Delhi Capitals** in IPL
Aman Chaudhary	18 September 2005 (age 21)	Right-handed	Slow left-arm orthodox	
Pace bowlers
**Navdeep Saini**	23 November 1992 (age 33)	Right-handed	Right-arm fast	
Simarjeet Singh	17 January 1998 (age 28)	Right-handed	Right-arm medium	
Money Grewal	4 October 2000 (age 26)	Right-handed	Right-arm medium	
**Ishant Sharma**	2 September 1988 (age 38)	Right-handed	Right-arm fast-medium	
**Harshit Rana**	22 December 2001 (age 24)	Right-handed	Right-arm fast	Plays for **Kolkata Knight Riders** in IPL
**Mayank Yadav**	17 June 2002 (age 24)	Right-handed	Right-arm fast	Plays for **Lucknow Super Giants** in IPL
Divij Mehra	25 September 2002 (age 24)	Right-handed	Right-arm medium	

Updated as on 15 November 2026

== Coaching staff ==
- Head coach - Vijay Dahiya
- Bowling Coach - V Aravind
- Batting coach - Bantu Singh
- Manager - Manoj Kapoor
- Under-19s Coach - Virat Kohli
- Physio - Deepak Sury
- Trainers - Nishanta Bordoloi
