= ACA–VDCA Cricket Stadium =

Cricket stadium

Coordinates: 17.797°N 83.352°E

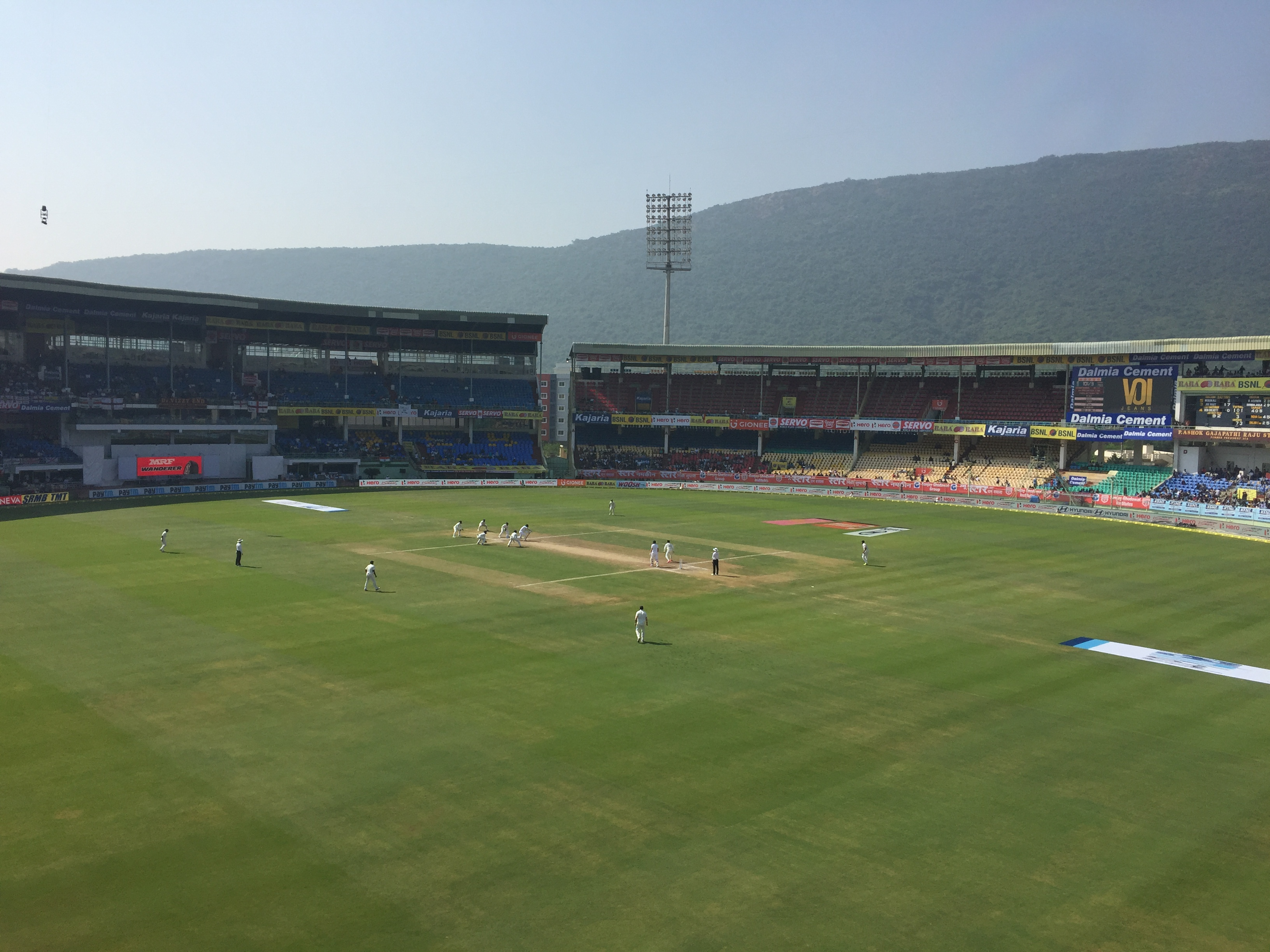
- Interactive map of ACA–VDCA Cricket Stadium

Ground information
- Location: Pothinamallayya Palem, Visakhapatnam, Andhra Pradesh, India
- Country: India
- Establishment: 2003; 23 years ago
- Capacity: 27,500
- Owner: Sports Authority of Andhra Pradesh
- Operator: Andhra Cricket Association
- Tenants: Indian cricket team India women's national cricket team Andhra cricket team Deccan Chargers; Sunrisers Hyderabad; Mumbai Indians; Rising Pune Supergiants; Delhi Capitals
- End names
- Vizzy End; DV Subba Rao End

International information
- First men's Test: 17–21 November 2016: India v England
- Last men's Test: 2–5 February 2024: India v England
- First men's ODI: 5 April 2005: India v Pakistan
- Last men's ODI: 06 December 2025: India v South Africa
- First men's T20I: 14 February 2016: India v Sri Lanka
- Last men's T20I: 28 January 2026: India v New Zealand
- First women's ODI: 24 February 2010: India v England
- Last women's ODI: 26 October 2025: New Zealand v England
- First women's T20I: 18 March 2012: India v Australia
- Last women's T20I: 23 December 2025: India v Sri Lanka
- As of 30 December 2025; Source: ESPNcricinfo

ACA–VDCA Cricket Stadium (stands for Andhra Cricket Association–Visakhapatnam District Cricket Association Cricket Stadium) is a multi-purpose stadium in Visakhapatnam, Andhra Pradesh, India. It is primarily used for international cricket matches. The stadium has two-tiers and was designed to avoid any restricted views, eliminating pillars or columns which come in the field of view of spectators. The pitch is known to be batter-friendly.

== Ground profile ==
The pitch assists spinners and the ball does not bounce much and hence, batting second is not always beneficial, though dew factor sometimes plays a significant role. The highest ODI Score here is 387 by India against West Indies, 2019.

== History ==
The stadium was established as ACA–VDCA Cricket Stadium in 2003. It hosted the first ODI match against Pakistan, in 2005. In September 2009, the name of the stadium was changed to Dr. Y. S. Rajasekhara Reddy ACA–VDCA Cricket Stadium by the executive committee of the Andhra Cricket Association. After being given Test status in 2015, it hosted its first test match in November 2016, between India and England. India won the match by 246 runs. The stadium hosted its first T20I in February 2016 between India and Sri Lanka.

The stadium also hosted few Indian Premier League matches and was the home ground of Deccan Chargers in 2012 and along with Sunrisers Hyderabad in 2015 and also with Mumbai Indians and Rising Pune Supergiants together in 2016. 2019 Indian Premier League, it was selected to host the Eliminator and Qualifier 2 of the tournament.

Majority of the Andhra Premier League matches are held since 2022. It is the home ground for the IPL team Delhi Capitals in 2024 and 2025 seasons. During the 2025 season, in March 2025, the name of the stadium is reverted to its initial name ACA–VDCA Cricket Stadium.

== Stats & records ==
Matches hosted

- Test — 3
- ODI — 11
- T20I — 5
- WODI — 10
- WT20I — 8
- (as on 28 January 2026)

Facts

- MS Dhoni scored his maiden ODI hundred (148) at this ground when Pakistan toured India in 2005.
- Rohit Sharma scored 159 off 138((17*4,5*6)) balls against West Indies on 18 December 2019, which is the highest individual ODI score for any batsmen on this ground.
- Rohit Sharma scored his first Test Hundred in his first innings as Test Opener on 3 October 2019, later in the same Test match, Rohit scored another 100 in the second innings. In the same test he smashed 13 sixes, that is the highest total for an individual in a test.
- Mayank Agarwal recorded his maiden Test Hundred and converted it into a double hundred (215) at this ground, which is the highest individual Test score for any batsmen on this ground.
- Adam Zampa recorded figures of 6 for 19 for Rising Pune SuperGiant in 2019, the best figures for a spinner in IPL history
- Highest ODI score posted by a team was 387/5 by India, vs West Indies, 2019.
- Rohit Sharma and K. L. Rahul scored 100's each and recorded 227 runs for the first wicket for India, vs West Indies, 2019.
- First time in an ODI that both captains Virat Kohli and Kieron Pollard have been dismissed for a first ball duck, on 18 December 2019.
- Kuldeep Yadav picked up his second ODI hat trick at this ground, vs West Indies, 2019.
- Josh Inglis scored his maiden T20I century at this ground. He scored 110 off 50 balls and this is the highest individual T20I score for any batsmen on this ground when Australia toured India in 2023
- Yashasvi Jaiswal scored his maiden double century in Tests at this ground. He scored 209 off 290 balls when England toured India in 2024.

== List of centuries ==
=== Key ===
- * denotes that the batsman was not out.
- Inns. denotes the number of the innings in the match.
- Balls denotes the number of balls faced in an innings.
- NR denotes that the number of balls was not recorded.
- Parentheses next to the player's score denotes his century number at Edgbaston.
- The column title Date refers to the date the match started.
- The column title Result refers to the player's team result

=== Tests ===
No.	Score	Player	Team	Balls	Inns.	Opposing team	Date	Result
1	119	Cheteshwar Pujara	India	204	1	England	17 November 2016	Won
2	167	Virat Kohli	India	267	1	England	17 November 2016	Won
3	176	Rohit Sharma	India	244	1	South Africa	2 October 2019	Won
4	215	Mayank Agarwal	India	371	1	South Africa	2 October 2019	Won
5	160	Dean Elgar	South Africa	287	1	India	2 October 2019	Lost
6	111	Quinton de Kock	South Africa	111	1	India	2 October 2019	Lost
7	127	Rohit Sharma	India	149	2	South Africa	2 October 2019	Won
8	209	Yashasvi Jaiswal	India	290	1	England	2 February 2024	Won
9	104	Shubman Gill	India	147	2	England	2 February 2024	Won

=== ODIs ===
No.	Score	Player	Team	Balls	Inns.	Opposing team	Date	Result
1	148	MS Dhoni	India	123	1	Pakistan	5 April 2005	Won
2	107*	Chamara Silva	Sri Lanka	107	1	India	17 February 2007	Lost
3	111*	Michael Clarke	Australia	139	1	India	10 October 2010	Lost
4	118	Virat Kohli	India	121	2	Australia	10 October 2010	Won
5	117	Virat Kohli	India	123	2	West Indies	2 December 2011	Won
6	100*	Shikhar Dhawan	India	85	2	Sri Lanka	17 December 2017	Won
7	157*	Virat Kohli	India	129	1	West Indies	24 October 2018	Tied
8	123*	Shai Hope	West Indies	134	2	India	24 October 2018	Tied
9	159	Rohit Sharma	India	138	1	West Indies	18 December 2019	Won
10	102	K. L. Rahul	India	104	1	West Indies	18 December 2019	Won
11	106	Quinton de Kock	South Africa	89	1	India	25 December 2025	Lost
12	116*	Yashasvi Jaiswal	India	121	2	South Africa	25 December 2025	Won

=== T20 Internationals ===
No.	Score	Player	Team	Balls	Inns.	Opposing Team	Date	Result
1	110	Josh Inglis	Australia	50	1	India	23 November 2023	Lost

=== Women's One Day Internationals ===
No.	Score	Player	Team	Balls	Inns.	Opposing Team	Date	Result
1	104*	Mithali Raj	India	109	1	Sri Lanka	23 January 2014	Won
2	142	Alyssa Healy	Australia	107	2	India	12 October 2025	Won
3	113*	Alyssa Healy	Australia	77	2	Bangladesh	16 October 2025	Won

== List of five wicket hauls ==
=== Key ===
Symbol	Meaning
†	The bowler was man of the match
‡	10 or more wickets taken in the match
§	One of two five-wicket hauls by the bowler in the match
Date	Day the Test started or ODI was held
Inn	Innings in which five-wicket haul was taken
Overs	Number of overs bowled.
Runs	Number of runs conceded
Wkts	Number of wickets taken
Econ	Runs conceded per over
Batsmen	Batsmen whose wickets were taken
Drawn	The match was drawn.

=== Tests ===
No.	Bowler	Date	Team	Opposing team	Inn	Overs	Runs	Wkts	Econ	Batsmen	Result
1	Ravichandran Ashwin	17 November 2016	India	England	2	29.5	67	5	2.24	Ben Duckett; Joe Root; Ben Stokes; Stuart Broad; James Anderson	Won
2	Ravichandran Ashwin	2 October 2019	India	South Africa	2	46.2	145	7	3.12	Aiden Markram; Theunis de Bruyn; Faf du Plessis; Quinton de Kock; Vernon Philander; Keshav Maharaj; Kagiso Rabada	Won
3	Mohammed Shami	2 October 2019	India	South Africa	4	10.5	35	5	3.23	Temba Bavuma; Faf du Plessis; Quinton de Kock; Dane Piedt; Kagiso Rabada	Won
4	Jasprit Bumrah	3 February 2024	India	England	2	15.5	45	6	3.23	Ollie Pope; Joe Root; Jonny Bairstow; Ben Stokes; Tom Hartley; James Anderson	Won

=== One Day Internationals ===
No.	Bowler	Date	Team	Opposing team	Inn	Overs	Runs	Wkts	Econ	Batsmen	Result
1	Amit Mishra	29 October 2016	India	New Zealand	2	6	18	5	3.00	Ross Taylor; BJ Watling; James Neesham; Tim Southee; Ish Sodhi	Won

== Notable events ==
- Due to water scarcity in Maharashtra during the IPL 2016 season, Mumbai Indians and Rising Pune Supergiants played 3 games each at this stadium. Visakhapatnam served as a home venue for both the teams.
- Rising Pune Supergiants skipper Mahendra Singh Dhoni [when CSK was facing eviction in 2016 & 2017] scored 22 runs off final over against Axar Patel of Kings XI Punjab on 21 May 2016 to secure one of the highest chases in T20s at this stadium.
- In 2016, Visakhapatnam hosted all 3 international formats in the same year in which India won the T20I, ODI and Test against Sri Lanka, New Zealand and England respectively.
- On 24 October 2018, Virat Kohli became the fastest player to score 10,000 ODI runs with 205 innings surpassing Sachin Tendulkar. He achieved this feat during the second ODI against West Indies.
- In 2019, due to the General Elections in India, Visakhapatnam was named as Standby venue for IPL 2019. Even though this stadium has not hosted any group stage matches, it was selected to host the playoffs stage of 2019 Indian Premier League for the first time.
- In 2024, due to the DDCA expressing inability to host Delhi Capitals home matches at the Arun Jaitley Stadium during the initial stage of IPL 2024 season, Visakhapatnam was chosen to host DC's first 2 home matches.

== Gallery ==
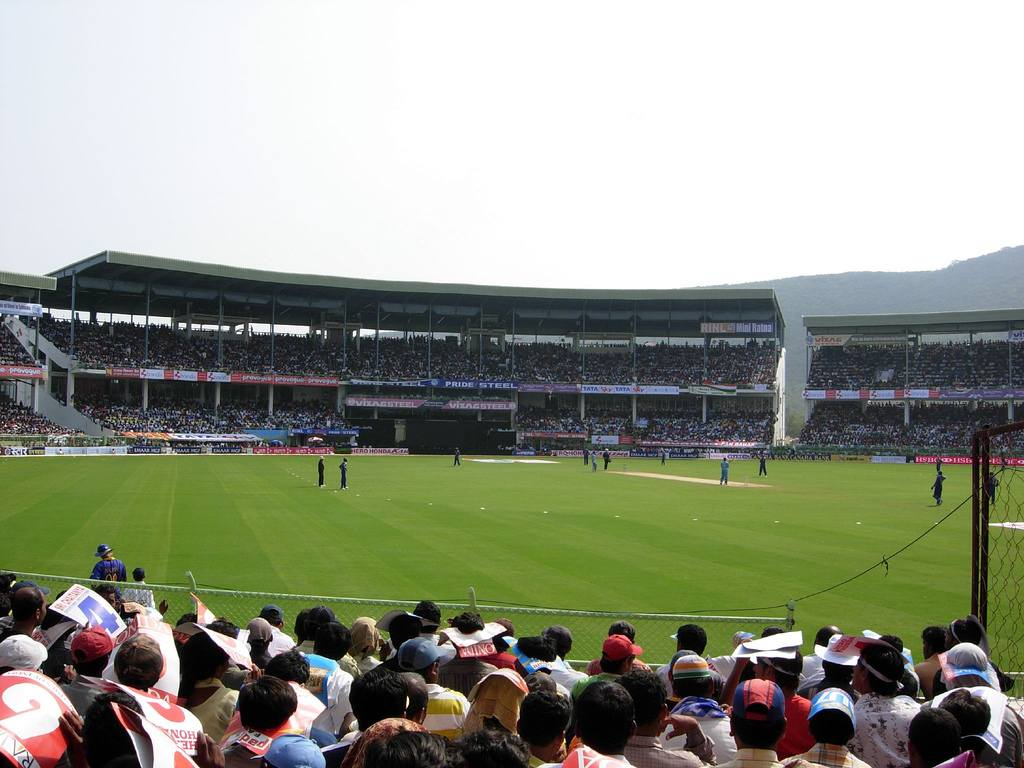
ACA–VDCA Cricket Stadium

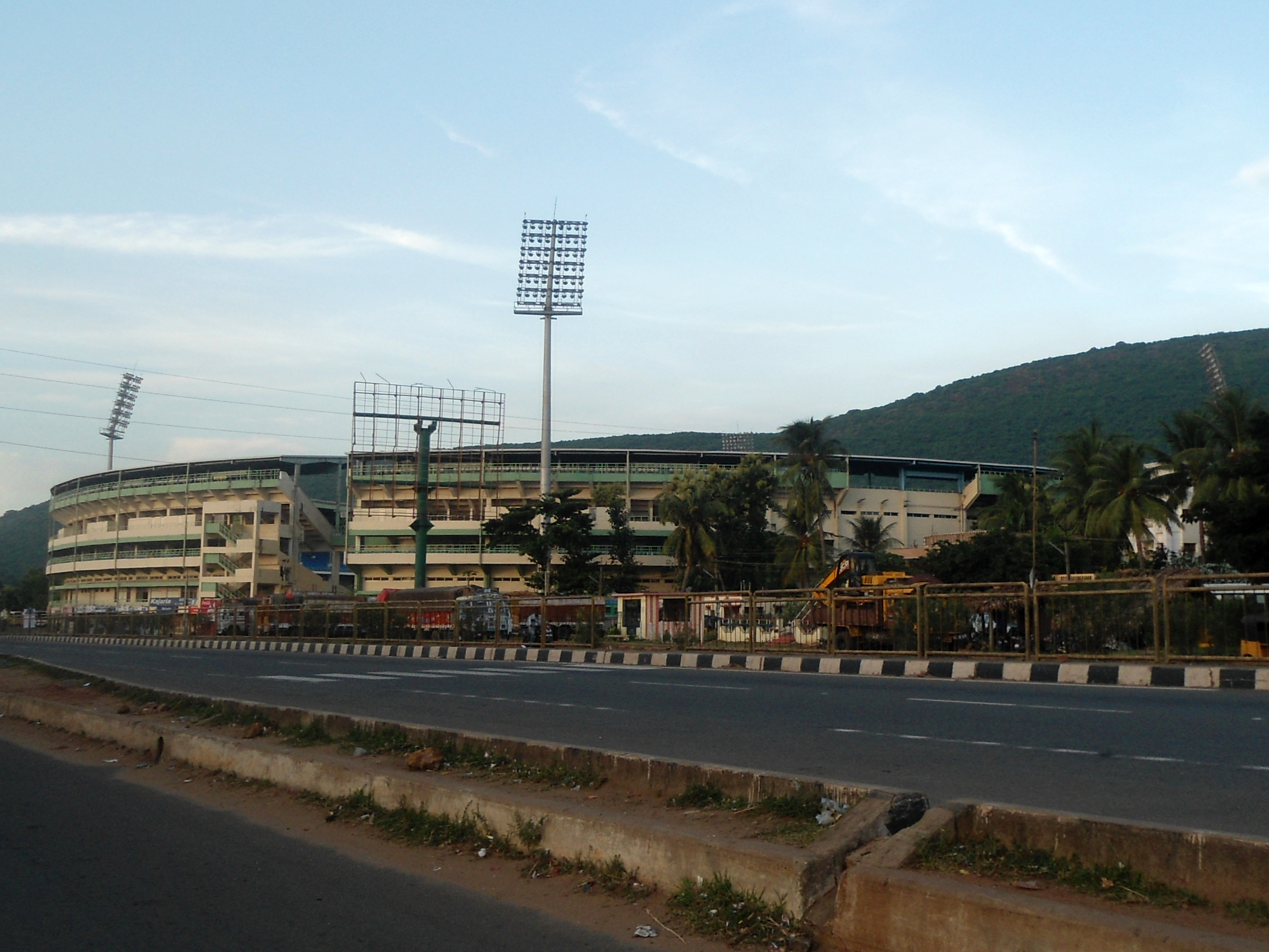
ACA–VDCA Cricket Stadium

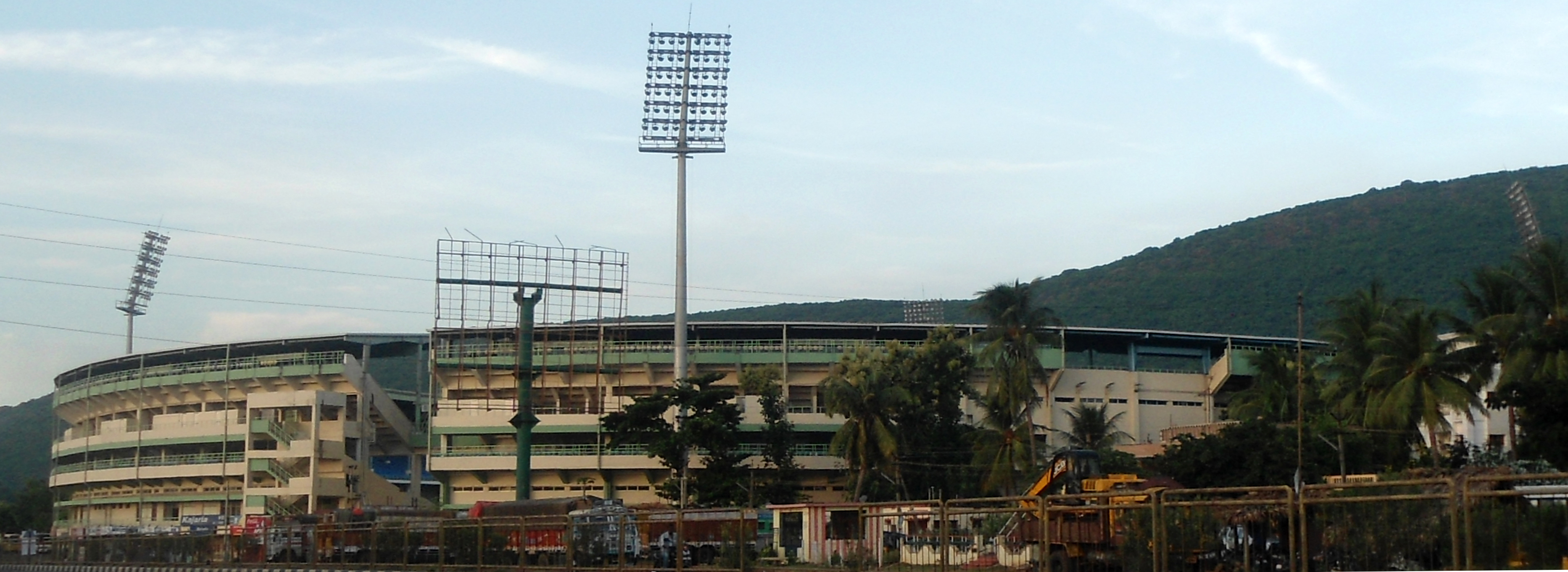
ACA–VDCA Cricket Stadium
