= Andhra Cricket Association =

Governing body of cricket in Andhra Pradesh, India

- Sport: Cricket
- Jurisdiction: Andhra Pradesh, India
- Abbreviation: ACA
- Founded: 1953
- Affiliation: Board of Control for Cricket in India
- Regional affiliation: South
- Headquarters: ACA International Cricket Stadium
- Location: Mangalagiri, Amaravati, Andhra Pradesh, India
- President: Kesineni Sivanath
- Coach: Yere Goud

Official website
- andhracricket.org
- (India)

Andhra Cricket Association (ACA) is the governing body of cricket in the Indian state of Andhra Pradesh. The association is affiliated to the Board of Control for Cricket in India (BCCI) and governs the Andhra cricket team. The association was founded in 1953 and has been affiliated to the BCCI ever since. The ACA operates the ACA–VDCA Cricket Stadium in Visakhapatnam, which hosts International-level Test, ODI and T20 cricket matches. The headquarters of the association is at Visakhapatnam. Sir Vizzy, the former captain of Indian cricket team, was instrumental in the formation of Andhra Cricket Association and was its founder president. Nayudu was also the first captain of Andhra cricket team.

== History ==
The roots of the organisation can be traced to the formation of the Guntur Recreation Club in 1951 which was affiliated to the Madras Cricket Association. The Andhra Cricket Association was eventually formed in 1953.

C. K. Nayudu, the first captain of Indian cricket team, was instrumental in the formation of Andhra Cricket Association. He was the founder president of ACA. C. K. Nayudu and his brother C. S. Nayudu played in Guntur and mentored the local cricketers. C. K. Nayudu, aged 58, led Andhra team in its first Ranji Trophy match against Mysore in the 1953–54 season. He also scored the team's first-ever fifty in that match.

The ACA has produced international players namely M. S. K. Prasad and Venugopal Rao. Many players from the ACA have played for India U-19s including D Sivakumar, Gnaneswara Rao (captained India U19s), GVS Prasad, Bodapati Sumanth and more recently Ricky Bhui.

== Grounds ==
Venue	City	Established	Capacity	Notes
International ground
ACA–VDCA Cricket Stadium	Visakhapatnam	2003	35,000	
ACA International Cricket Stadium	Mangalagiri		34,000	
Domestic grounds
Dr PVG Raju ACA Sports Complex	Vizianagram	2013	n/a	
Andhra Cricket Association Women's Cricket Academy Ground	Guntur	2011	n/a	
CSR Sarma College Ground	Ongole	2012	n/a	
Kandula Sreenivasa Reddy Memorial College of Engineering Ground	Cuddapah	2012	n/a	
Port Trust Diamond Jubilee Stadium	Visakhapatnam	1993	n/a	Hosted Afro-Asia Under-19 Cup in 2005
Rural Development Trust Stadium	Anantapur	2003	5,000	
YS Raja Reddy Stadium	Cuddapah	2011	15,000	
Nellore International Cricket Stadium	Mogghallapalem, Andhra Pradesh	2016	N/A	Stadium was proposed in 2016; ground work has still not started.

== See also ==
- Andhra Pradesh cricket team
