= Andhra cricket team =

Indian cricket team

Personnel
- Captain: Ricky Bhui (FC); Nitish Kumar Reddy (List A); Ricky Bhui (T20)
- Owner: Andhra Cricket Association

Team information
- Founded: 1953
- Home ground: ACA-VDCA International Cricket Stadium, Visakhapatnam
- Capacity: 27,500

History
- First-class debut: Mysore in 1953 at Central College Ground, Bangalore
- Ranji Trophy wins: 0
- Irani Trophy wins: 0
- Vijay Hazare Trophy wins: 0
- Syed Mushtaq Ali Trophy wins: 0
- Official website: www.andhracricket.com

The Andhra cricket team is an Indian domestic cricket team representing the South Indian state of Andhra Pradesh. The team's main home ground is ACA-VDCA International Cricket Stadium at Visakhapatnam, while some home matches are also played at Anantapur and Kadapa. C. K. Nayudu was the first captain of the team.

== History ==
The roots of organisation can be traced to the formation of the Guntur Recreation Club in 1951 which was affiliated to the Madras Cricket Association. The Andhra Cricket Association was eventually formed in 1953. C. K. Nayudu was instrumental in the formation of ACA and was its founder president.

Andhra competed in the Ranji Trophy for the first time in the 1953–54 season, captained by Nayudu, who scored the team's first fifty in that match. Andhra has competed in every Ranji Trophy season since, with the exception of 1961–62, when it was absent. It falls under the South Zone of Indian cricket.

After the 2019–20 season Andhra had played 326 first-class matches, with 50 wins, 132 losses and 144 draws. In List A cricket, Andhra had played 148 matches, with 49 wins, 97 losses and two no-results.

Andhra has never featured in a Ranji Trophy final and has therefore never had a chance to participate in the Irani Trophy. In the 2007/08 season Andhra, captained by M. S. K. Prasad, achieved two wins out of six in the Elite Group of the Ranji Trophy, missing out of the semi-finals. In February 2018, they reached the semi-finals of the 2017–18 Vijay Hazare Trophy, the first time the team had got to that stage of the Vijay Hazare Trophy. In 2019-20 Andhra reached the Ranji Trophy quarter-finals, losing to Saurashtra, who went on to win the trophy.

== Notable players ==
Players from Andhra who have played Test cricket for India, along with year of Test debut:

- M. S. K. Prasad (1999)
- Hanuma Vihari (2018)
- K. S. Bharat (2023)
- Nitish Kumar Reddy (2024)

Players from Andhra who have played ODI but not Test cricket for India, along with year of ODI debut:

- Y. Venugopal Rao (2005)
- Ambati Rayudu (2013)

Indian Test players from other states who have played for Andhra, along with Ranji Trophy seasons:

- C. K. Nayudu (1953-54)
- C. S. Nayudu (1953-54, 1955-56, 1959-60)
- Vijay Manjrekar (1956-57)
- Sairaj Bahutule (2010-11)
- Mohammad Kaif (2014-15, 2015-16)
- Karn Sharma (2018-19)

Long-term cricketers from Andhra who have played Ranji Trophy along with Duleep Trophy and Deodhar Trophy seasons:

- Danthala Venkata Meher Baba (1971-72, 1972-73, 1973-74, 1974-75, 1975-76, 1976-77, 1977-78, 1979-80, 1980-81, 1981-82, 1982-83, 1983-84, 1984-85, 1985-86, 1986-87, 1987-88, 1988-89)

== Current squad ==
Players with international caps are listed in bold.

Name	Birth date	Batting style	Bowling style	Notes
Batsmen
Ricky Bhui	29 September 1996 (age 30)	Right-handed		**First-class & Twenty20 captain**
Shaik Rasheed	24 September 2004 (age 22)	Right-handed	Right arm leg break	
Abhishek Reddy	14 September 1994 (age 32)	Right-handed	Right arm off break	
Ashwin Hebbar	15 November 1995 (age 31)	Right-handed	Right arm slow-medium	
SDNV Prasad	11 January 2003 (age 23)	Left-handed		
Karan Shinde	19 September 1997 (age 29)	Left-handed	Right arm leg break	
CR Gnaneshwar	15 October 1997 (age 29)	Right-handed	Right arm off break	
SV Rahul	10 October 2007 (age 19)	Right-handed	Slow left-arm orthodox	
All-Rounders
**Nitish Kumar Reddy**	26 May 2003 (age 23)	Right-handed	Right arm medium	**List A captain** Plays for **Sunrisers Hyderabad** in IPL
Hemanth Reddy	28 October 2002 (age 24)	Right-handed	Right arm leg break	
Sandeep	19 January 1998	Right-handed	Right arm medium	
Wicket-keeper
Revanth Reddy	25 February 2004 (age 22)	Right-handed		
Spin Bowlers
Saurabh Kumar	1 May 1993 (age 33)	Left-handed	Slow left-arm orthodox	
Tripurana Vijay	5 September 2001 (age 25)	Right-handed	Right arm off break	Plays for **Delhi Capitals** in IPL
Bailapudi Yeswanth	19 March 2005 (age 21)	Right-handed	Right arm leg break	
Lalith Mohan	19 March 1990 (age 36)	Right-handed	Slow left-arm orthodox	
Pace Bowlers
Satyanarayana Raju	10 July 1999 (age 27)	Right-handed	Right arm medium	
K. V. Sasikanth	17 July 1995 (age 31)	Right-handed	Right arm medium	
KS Narasimha Raju	27 October 2002 (age 24)	Right-handed	Right arm medium	
Kavuri Saiteja	29 January 2000 (age 26)	Right-handed	Right arm medium	
J Saketh Ram	10 June 2002 (age 24)	Right-handed	Right arm medium	
CV Stephen	3 December 1993 (age 32)	Left-handed	Left arm medium	

Updated as on 14 November 2026

== Coaching staff ==
- Director Of Cricket Operations- Venugopal Rao
- Head coach - Gary Stead
- Assistant coach - Hemal Watekar
- Assistant coach - Venkata Appa Rao
- Fielding Coach - Subhadeep Ghosh.
