= Indian cricket team in the West Indies in 1988–89 =

International cricket tour

Indian cricket team in West Indies in 1988–89
- Date: 2 March – 3 May 1989
- Location: (Cricket West Indies) West Indies
- Result: West Indies won the 4-match Test series 3–0; West Indies won the 5-match ODI series 5–0
Teams
- West Indies: India
Captains
- Viv Richards: Dilip Vengsarkar
Most runs
- Richie Richardson (619) Desmond Haynes (280) Gordon Greenidge (243): Sanjay Manjrekar (200); Navjot Sidhu (179); Ravi Shastri (170)
Most wickets
- Malcolm Marshall (19) Courtney Walsh (18) Ian Bishop (16): Kapil Dev (18); Arshad Ayub (14); Chetan Sharma (8)

The India national cricket team toured the West Indies during the 1988–89 cricket season. India played four Test matches and five One Day International matches between 2 March and 3 May 1989, against the West Indian cricket team, with the West Indies winning the Test series 3–0 and ODI series 5–0.

== Background ==
The Indian squad for left for the West Indies on 26 February 1989. The side entered Caribbean on the back of a decent record barring the 1961–62 tour when they lost the series 5–0. In the 24 Tests played until then, India had won 2, lost 10 and drawn 12.

== First-class matches ==
=== Four-day: West Indies Board President's XI v Indians ===
2–5 March 1989
Scorecard

Indians	v	West Indies Board President's XI
356 (112.4 overs); Ravi Shastri 57; George Ferris 3/88		246 (88 overs); Carlisle Best 104*; Kapil Dev 6/27 (14 overs)
307 (90.1 overs); Kapil Dev 97; Robert Haynes 3/60 (26.1 overs)		183/3 (58 overs); Phil Simmons 116*; Ravi Shastri 2/35 (13 overs)

Match drawn
Kensington Oval, Bridgetown, Barbados
Umpires: David Archer and T Squires

- Indians won the toss and decided to bat.
- Rain interrupted play on day two.

=== Three-day: West Indies Under-23s v Indians ===
14–16 March 1989
Scorecard

Indians	v	West Indies Under-23s
411/6d (119 overs); Navjot Singh Sidhu 114; Linden Joseph 2/57 (20 overs)		405 (127.3 overs); Brian Lara 182 (237); Narendra Hirwani 5/150 (36.3 overs)
39/0 (9 overs); Arun Lal 21*; Nehemiah Perry 0/4 (2 overs)

Match drawn
Warner Park, Basseterre, Saint Kitts and Nevis
Umpires: Andrew Weekes and Pat Whyte

- Indians won the toss and decided to bat.

The India team entered the game on the back of a 3–0 ODI series loss against the West Indies senior team, which ended on 11 March. Players who featured in the said matches and the first-class match against West Indies Board President's XI — Dilip Vengsarkar, Kapil Dev, Mohammad Azharuddin, Kiran More — and two others, Ravi Shastri and Chetan Sharma, were rested. The side was captained by Krishnamachari Srikkanth. The West Indies Under-23s included Kenny Benjamin, who played for the senior team. Carl Hooper, another regular in both teams, was rested for the game. The Under-23s side was captained by Brian Lara, then 19. Batting first after winning the toss, the Indians declared after making 411/6. Navjot Singh Sidhu and Sanjay Manjrekar put on 171 runs for the third wicket with both scoring centuries. The West Indies Under-23s were all out at 405, with Lara top-scoring for the side with 182, coming off 237 balls. His century came in 177 balls and included 12 fours. For the Indians, Narendra Hirwani (5/150) returned with best figures.

=== Four-day: West Indies Board XI v Indians ===
1–4 April 1989
Scorecard

Indians	v	West Indies Board XI
103/9d (50.1 overs); Sanjay Manjrekar 39; Patrick Patterson 5/47 (19 overs)		185/3 (43.1 overs); Carlisle Best 58; Kapil Dev 1/27 (7 overs)

Match drawn
Arnos Vale Playing Field, Kingstown, Saint Vincent and the Grenadines
Umpires: George Browne and Glenroy T. Johnson

- West Indies Board XI won the toss and decided to field.
- Rain prevented any play on days one and three.

=== Four-day: Jamaica v Indians ===
22–25 April 1989
Scorecard

Indians	v	Jamaica
586 (158.3 overs); Navjot Singh Sidhu 286; Steve Gordon 2/103 (22 overs)		330 (143 overs); Cleveland Davidson 74; Sanjeev Sharma 4/61 (25 overs)
104/3 (37 overs); Sanjay Manjrekar 41*; Steve Gordon 2/26 (8 overs)

Match drawn
Sabina Park, Kingston, Jamaica
Umpires: Lindel Bell and Antonio Gaynor

- Indians won the toss and decided to bat.
- Robert Samuels and Carlton Carter (Jamaica) made their first-class debuts.
- Navjot Singh Sidhu's score of 286 is his highest in first-class matches.

== Test matches ==
=== 1st Test ===
25–30 March 1989
Scorecard

West Indies	v	India
437 (141 overs); Richie Richardson 194 (367); Arshad Ayub 5/104 (31 overs)		86/1 (39 overs); Navjot Sidhu 42* (104); Courtney Walsh 1/12 (6 overs)

Match drawn
Bourda, Georgetown
Umpires: David Archer (WI) and Lloyd Barker (WI)

- India won the toss and decided to field
- Rain on day two and rest day (extended as playing day) prevented any further play.
- Ian Bishop (WI) made his Test debut.

=== 2nd Test ===
7–12 April 1989
Scorecard

India	v	West Indies
321 (105.2 overs); Sanjay Manjrekar 108; Ian Bishop 6/87 (25 overs)		377 (111.5 overs); Gordon Greenidge 117; Ravi Shastri 4/78 (28 overs)
251 (97.3 overs); Ravi Shastri 107; Malcolm Marshall 5/60 (26 overs)		196/2 (48 overs); Desmond Haynes 112; Chetan Sharma 1/19 (4 overs)

West Indies won by 8 wickets
Kensington Oval, Bridgetown
Umpires: David Archer (WI) and Lloyd Barker (WI)
Player of the match: Ravi Shastri (Ind)

- West Indies won the toss and decided to field

=== 3rd Test ===
15–20 April 1989
Scorecard

West Indies	v	India
314 (123.3 overs); Gus Logie 87; Arshad Ayub 5/117 (52 overs)		150 (67 overs); Arun Lal 30; Malcolm Marshall 5/34 (17 overs)
266 (97 overs); Richie Richardson 99; Kapil Dev 5/58 (25 overs)		213 (81.5 overs); Dilip Vengsarkar 62; Malcolm Marshall 6/55 (19.5 overs)

West Indies won by 217 runs
Queen's Park Oval, Port of Spain
Umpires: Clyde Cumberbatch (WI) and Andrew Weekes (WI)
Player of the match: Malcolm Marshall (WI)

- India won the toss and decided to field

=== 4th Test ===
28 April–3 May 1989
scorecard

India	v	West Indies
289 (102.2 overs); Navjot Sidhu 116; Courtney Walsh 6/62 (29 overs)		384 (123.5 overs); Richie Richardson 156; Kapil Dev 6/84 (33 overs)
152 (48.3 overs); Sanjay Manjrekar 41; Courtney Walsh 4/39 (17 overs)		60/3 (18.4 overs); Desmond Haynes 35; Ravi Shastri 1/9 (7 overs)

West Indies won by 7 wickets
Sabina Park, Kingston
Umpires: David Archer (WI) and Steve Bucknor (WI)
Player of the match: Courtney Walsh (WI)

- West Indies won the toss and decided to field
- M. Venkataramana (Ind) made his Test debut.

== ODIs ==
The West Indies won the Cable and Wireless ODI Series 5–0.

=== 1st ODI ===
7 March 1989
Scorecard

West Indies; 248/4 (48 overs)	v	India; 198/8 (48 overs)
DL Haynes 117* (132); Kapil Dev 2/30 (9 overs)		AK Sharma 43* (48); IVA Richards 3/47 (10 overs)

West Indies won by 50 runs
Kensington Oval, Bridgetown, Barbados
Umpires: DM Archer and LH Barker
Player of the match: DL Haynes (WI)

- India won the toss and elected to field.
- The match was reduced to 48 overs per side.

=== 2nd ODI ===
9 March 1989
Scorecard

India; 148 (48 overs)	v	West Indies; 151/4 (38.4 overs)
Kapil Dev 44 (47); Viv Richards 4/42 (10 overs)		CG Greenidge 70 (106); K Srikkanth 3/26 (4.4 overs)

West Indies won by 6 wickets
Queen's Park Oval, Port of Spain, Trinidad and Tobago
Umpires: CE Cumberbatch and M Hosein
Player of the match: CG Greenidge (WI)

- West Indies won the toss and elected to field.

=== 3rd ODI ===
11 March 1989
Scorecard

India; 192 (49.5 overs)	v	West Indies; 193/4 (47.2 overs)
NS Sidhu 50 (92); IR Bishop 4/33 (9.5 overs)		KLT Arthurton 76* (114); C Sharma 1/23 (8 overs)

West Indies won by 6 wickets
Queen's Park Oval, Port of Spain, Trinidad and Tobago
Umpires: CE Cumberbatch and GT Johnson
Player of the match: KLT Arthurton (WI)

- India won the toss and elected to bat.
- RR Singh (IND) made his ODI debut.

=== 4th ODI ===
18 March 1989
Scorecard

India; 237/8 (50 overs)	v	West Indies; 240/2 (43.2 overs)
DB Vengsarkar 88 (120); IR Bishop 4/46 (10 overs)		CG Greenidge 117 (123); AK Sharma 1/47 (10 overs)

West Indies won by 8 wickets
Antigua Recreation Ground, St. John's, Antigua and Barbuda
Umpires: SA Bucknor and AE Weekes
Player of the match: CG Greenidge (WI)

- India won the toss and elected to bat.

=== 5th ODI ===
21 March 1989
Scorecard

West Indies; 289/2 (43.5 overs)	v	India; 188/8 (44 overs)
DL Haynes 152* (126); C Sharma 1/38 (7.5 overs)		Kapil Dev 38 (48); IVA Richards 3/41 (10 overs)

West Indies won by 101 runs
Bourda, Georgetown, Guyana
Umpires: LH Barker and CR Duncan
Player of the match: DL Haynes (WI)

- India won the toss and elected to field.
- The match was reduced to 43.5 overs per side.
