= International cricket in 1989–90 =

International cricket season

The 1989–1990 international cricket season was from September 1989 to April 1990.

== Season overview ==
International tours
Start date	Home team	Away team	Results [Matches]			
Start date	Home team	Away team	Test	ODI	FC	LA
15 November 1989	Pakistan	India	0–0 [4]	2–0 [4]	—	—
24 November 1989	Australia	New Zealand	0–0 [1]	—	—	—
8 December 1989	Australia	Sri Lanka	1–0 [2]	—	—	—
12 January 1990	Australia	Pakistan	1–0 [3]	—	—	—
2 February 1990	New Zealand	India	1–0 [3]	—	—	—
14 February 1990	West Indies	England	2–1 [4]	3–0 [5]	—	—
15 March 1990	New Zealand	Australia	1–0 [1]	—	—	—
International tournaments
Start date	Tournament				Winners	
13 October 1989	(United Arab Emirates) 1989-90 Champions Trophy				Pakistan	
15 October 1989	(India) 1989 MRF World Series				Pakistan	
26 December 1989	(Australia) 1989–90 Benson & Hedges World Series				Australia	
1 March 1990	(New Zealand) 1990 Rothmans Cup Triangular Series				Australia	

== October ==
=== 1989-90 Champions Trophy ===
Team	P	W	L	T	NR	RR	Points
Pakistan	4	4	0	0	0	5.285	16
India	4	1	3	0	0	4.492	4
West Indies	4	1	3	0	0	3.872	4

Group stage
No.	Date	Team 1	Captain 1	Team 2	Captain 2	Venue	Result
ODI 569	13 October	India	Kris Srikkanth	West Indies	Vivian Richards	Sharjah Cricket Stadium, Sharjah	West Indies by 5 wickets
ODI 570	14 October	Pakistan	Imran Khan	West Indies	Vivian Richards	Sharjah Cricket Stadium, Sharjah	Pakistan by 11 runs
ODI 572	15 October	India	Kris Srikkanth	Pakistan	Imran Khan	Sharjah Cricket Stadium, Sharjah	Pakistan by 6 wickets
ODI 573	13 October	India	Kris Srikkanth	West Indies	Vivian Richards	Sharjah Cricket Stadium, Sharjah	India by 37 runs
ODI 574	17 October	Pakistan	Imran Khan	West Indies	Desmond Haynes	Sharjah Cricket Stadium, Sharjah	Pakistan by 57 runs
ODI 577	20 October	India	Kris Srikkanth	Pakistan	Javed Miandad	Sharjah Cricket Stadium, Sharjah	Pakistan by 38 runs

=== 1989 MRF World Series ===
Team	Pts	Pld	W	L	R/R
India	12	5	3	2	4.63
England	12	5	3	2	4.52
Pakistan	12	5	3	2	4.30
West Indies	12	5	3	2	4.13
Australia	8	5	2	3	4.36
Sri Lanka	4	5	1	4	4.05

Group stage
No.	Date	Team 1	Captain 1	Team 2	Captain 2	Venue	Result
ODI 571	15 October	England	Graham Gooch	Sri Lanka	Arjuna Ranatunga	Feroz Shah Kotla, Delhi	England by 5 wickets
ODI 575	19 October	Australia	Allan Border	England	Graham Gooch	Lal Bahadur Shastri Stadium, Hyderabad	England by 7 wickets
ODI 576	19 October	Sri Lanka	Arjuna Ranatunga	West Indies	Vivian Richards	Madhavrao Scindia Cricket Ground, Rajkot	Sri Lanka by 4 wickets
ODI 578	21 October	Australia	Allan Border	West Indies	Vivian Richards	MA Chidambaram Stadium, Chennai	Australia by 99 runs
ODI 579	22 October	England	Graham Gooch	Pakistan	Imran Khan	Barabati Stadium, Cuttack	England by 4 wickets
ODI 580	22 October	India	Kris Srikkanth	Sri Lanka	Arjuna Ranatunga	Sardar Patel Stadium, Ahmedabad	India by 6 runs
ODI 581	23 October	Australia	Allan Border	Pakistan	Imran Khan	Brabourne Stadium, Mumbai	Pakistan by 66 runs
ODI 582	23 October	India	Kris Srikkanth	West Indies	Vivian Richards	Feroz Shah Kotla, Delhi	West Indies by 20 runs
ODI 583	25 October	India	Kris Srikkanth	England	Graham Gooch	Green Park Stadium, Kanpur	India by 6 wickets
ODI 584	25 October	Pakistan	Imran Khan	West Indies	Vivian Richards	Gandhi Stadium, Jalandhar	West Indies by 6 wickets
ODI 585	25 October	Australia	Allan Border	Sri Lanka	Arjuna Ranatunga	Nehru Stadium, Margao	Australia by 28 runs
ODI 586	27 October	England	Graham Gooch	West Indies	Vivian Richards	Captain Roop Singh Stadium, Gwalior	West Indies by 26 runs
ODI 587	27 October	India	Kris Srikkanth	Australia	Allan Border	M Chinnaswamy Stadium, Bangalore	India by 3 wickets
ODI 588	27 October	Pakistan	Imran Khan	Sri Lanka	Arjuna Ranatunga	K. D. Singh Babu Stadium, Lucknow	Pakistan by 6 runs
ODI 589	28 October	India	Kris Srikkanth	Pakistan	Imran Khan	Eden Gardens, Kolkata	Pakistan by 77 runs
Semi-Finals
No.	Date	Team 1	Captain 1	Team 2	Captain 2	Venue	Result
ODI 590	30 October	England	Graham Gooch	Pakistan	Imran Khan	Vidarbha Cricket Association Ground, Nagpur	Pakistan by 6 wickets
ODI 591	30 October	India	Kris Srikkanth	West Indies	Vivian Richards	Wankhede Stadium, Mumbai	West Indies by 8 wickets
Final
No.	Date	Team 1	Captain 1	Team 2	Captain 2	Venue	Result
ODI 592	1 November	Pakistan	Imran Khan	West Indies	Vivian Richards	Eden Gardens, Kolkata	Pakistan by 4 wickets

== November ==
=== India in Pakistan ===
Test series
No.	Date	Home captain	Away captain	Venue	Result
Test 1127	15–20 November	Imran Khan	Kris Srikkanth	National Stadium, Karachi	Match drawn
Test 1128	23–28 November	Imran Khan	Kris Srikkanth	Iqbal Stadium, Faisalabad	Match drawn
Test 1130	1–6 December	Imran Khan	Kris Srikkanth	Gaddafi Stadium, Lahore	Match drawn
Test 1132	9–14 December	Imran Khan	Kris Srikkanth	Jinnah Stadium, Sialkot	Match drawn
ODI series
No.	Date	Home captain	Away captain	Venue	Result
ODI 592a	16 December	Imran Khan	Kris Srikkanth	Arbab Niaz Stadium, Peshawar	Match abandoned
ODI 593	18 December	Imran Khan	Kris Srikkanth	Jinnah Stadium, Gujranwala	Pakistan by 7 runs
ODI 594	20 December	Imran Khan	Kris Srikkanth	National Stadium, Karachi	No result
ODI 595	22 December	Imran Khan	Kris Srikkanth	Gaddafi Stadium, Lahore	Pakistan by 38 runs

=== New Zealand in Australia ===
Trans-Tasman Trophy - One-off Test
No.	Date	Home captain	Away captain	Venue	Result
Test 1129	24–28 November	Allan Border	John Wright	WACA Ground, Perth	Match drawn

== December ==
=== Sri Lanka in Australia ===
Test series
No.	Date	Home captain	Away captain	Venue	Result
Test 1131	8–12 December	Allan Border	Arjuna Ranatunga	The Gabba, Brisbane	Match drawn
Test 1133	16–20 December	Allan Border	Arjuna Ranatunga	Bellerive Oval, Hobart	Australia by 174 runs

=== 1989–90 Benson & Hedges World Series ===
Group stage
No.	Date	Team 1	Captain 1	Team 2	Captain 2	Venue	Result
ODI 596	26 December	Australia	Allan Border	Sri Lanka	Arjuna Ranatunga	Melbourne Cricket Ground, Melbourne	Australia by 30 runs
ODI 597	30 December	Australia	Allan Border	Sri Lanka	Arjuna Ranatunga	WACA Ground, Perth	Australia by 9 wickets
ODI 598	31 December	Pakistan	Imran Khan	Sri Lanka	Arjuna Ranatunga	WACA Ground, Perth	Sri Lanka by 3 wickets
ODI 599	3 January	Australia	Allan Border	Pakistan	Imran Khan	Melbourne Cricket Ground, Melbourne	Australia by 7 wickets
ODI 600	4 January	Australia	Allan Border	Sri Lanka	Arjuna Ranatunga	Melbourne Cricket Ground, Melbourne	Australia by 73 runs
ODI 601	10 February	Pakistan	Imran Khan	Sri Lanka	Arjuna Ranatunga	The Gabba, Brisbane	Pakistan by 5 wickets
ODI 602	11 February	Australia	Allan Border	Pakistan	Imran Khan	The Gabba, Brisbane	Australia by 67 runs
ODI 603	13 February	Australia	Allan Border	Pakistan	Imran Khan	Sydney Cricket Ground, Sydney	Pakistan by 5 wickets
ODI 605	15 February	Pakistan	Imran Khan	Sri Lanka	Arjuna Ranatunga	Bellerive Oval, Hobart	Pakistan by 6 wickets
ODI 606	17 February	Pakistan	Imran Khan	Sri Lanka	Arjuna Ranatunga	Adelaide Oval, Adelaide	Pakistan by 27 runs
ODI 608	18 February	Australia	Allan Border	Sri Lanka	Arjuna Ranatunga	Adelaide Oval, Adelaide	Australia by 7 wickets
Finals
No.	Date	Team 1	Captain 1	Team 2	Captain 2	Venue	Result
ODI 610	23 February	Australia	Allan Border	Pakistan	Imran Khan	Melbourne Cricket Ground, Melbourne	Australia by 7 wickets
ODI 611	25 February	Australia	Allan Border	Pakistan	Imran Khan	Sydney Cricket Ground, Sydney	Australia by 69 runs

== January ==
=== Pakistan in Australia ===
Test series
No.	Date	Home captain	Away captain	Venue	Result
Test 1134	12–16 January	Allan Border	Imran Khan	Melbourne Cricket Ground, Melbourne	Australia by 92 runs
Test 1135	19–23 January	Allan Border	Imran Khan	Adelaide Oval, Adelaide	Match drawn
Test 1137	3–8 February	Allan Border	Imran Khan	Sydney Cricket Ground, Sydney	Match drawn

== February ==
=== India in New Zealand ===
Test series
No.	Date	Home captain	Away captain	Venue	Result
Test 1136	2–5 February	John Wright	Mohammad Azharuddin	AMI Stadium, Christchurch	New Zealand by 10 wickets
Test 1138	9–13 February	John Wright	Mohammad Azharuddin	McLean Park, Napier	Match drawn
Test 1139	22–26 February	John Wright	Mohammad Azharuddin	Eden Park, Auckland	Match drawn

=== England in the West Indies ===
ODI series
No.	Date	Home captain	Away captain	Venue	Result
ODI 604	14 February	Vivian Richards	Graham Gooch	Queen's Park Oval, Port of Spain	No result
ODI 607	17 February	Vivian Richards	Graham Gooch	Queen's Park Oval, Port of Spain	No result
ODI 614	3 March	Vivian Richards	Graham Gooch	Sabina Park, Kingston	West Indies by 3 wickets
ODI 617	7 March	Vivian Richards	Graham Gooch	Bourda, Georgetown	West Indies by 6 wickets
ODI 622	3 April	Desmond Haynes	Graham Gooch	Kensington Oval, Bridgetown	West Indies by 4 wickets
Georgetown Test replacement ODI Matches
No.	Date	Home captain	Away captain	Venue	Result
ODI 620a	14 March	Vivian Richards	Graham Gooch	Bourda, Georgetown	Match abandoned
ODI 621	15 March	Jeff Dujon	Graham Gooch	Bourda, Georgetown	West Indies by 7 wickets
Wisden Trophy - Test series
No.	Date	Home captain	Away captain	Venue	Result
Test 1140	24 February-1 March	Vivian Richards	Graham Gooch	Sabina Park, Kingston	England by 9 wickets
Test 1140a	10–15 March	Vivian Richards	Graham Gooch	Bourda, Georgetown	Match abandoned
Test 1142	23–28 March	Desmond Haynes	Graham Gooch	Queen's Park Oval, Port of Spain	Match drawn
Test 1143	5–10 April	Vivian Richards	Allan Lamb	Kensington Oval, Bridgetown	West Indies by 164 runs
Test 1144	12–16 April	Vivian Richards	Allan Lamb	Antigua Recreation Ground, St John's	West Indies by an innings and 32 runs

== March ==
=== 1990 Rothmans Cup Triangular Series ===
Team	P	W	L	T	NR	RR	Points
Australia	4	4	0	0	0	4.523	8
New Zealand	4	1	3	0	0	4.020	2
India	4	1	3	0	0	3.770	2

Group stage
No.	Date	Team 1	Captain 1	Team 2	Captain 2	Venue	Result
ODI 612	1 March	New Zealand	John Wright	India	Mohammad Azharuddin	Carisbrook, Dunedin	New Zealand by 108 runs
ODI 613	3 March	Australia	Allan Border	India	Mohammad Azharuddin	AMI Stadium, Christchurch	Australia by 18 runs
ODI 615	4 March	New Zealand	Martin Crowe	Australia	Allan Border	AMI Stadium, Christchurch	Australia by 150 runs
ODI 616	6 March	New Zealand	Martin Crowe	India	Mohammad Azharuddin	Basin Reserve, Wellington	India by 1 run
ODI 618	8 March	Australia	Allan Border	India	Mohammad Azharuddin	Seddon Park, Hamilton	Australia by 7 wickets
ODI 619	10 March	New Zealand	John Wright	Australia	Geoff Marsh	Eden Park, Auckland	Australia by 10 runs
Final
No.	Date	Team 1	Captain 1	Team 2	Captain 2	Venue	Result
ODI 620	11 March	New Zealand	John Wright	Australia	Allan Border	Eden Park, Auckland	Australia by 8 wickets

=== Australia in New Zealand ===
Trans-Tasman Trophy - One-off Test
No.	Date	Home captain	Away captain	Venue	Result
Test 1141	15–19 March	John Wright	Allan Border	Basin Reserve, Wellington	New Zealand by 9 wickets
