= 1990 Rothmans Cup Triangular Series =

International cricket tournament

1990 Rothmans Cup
- Dates: 1 March – 11 March 1990
- Cricket format: ODI
- Host: New Zealand
- Champions: Australia
- Participants: 3
- Matches: 7
- Most runs: (Australia) DM Jones (300)
- Most wickets: (New Zealand) DK Morrison (9)

The 1990 Rothmans Cup was a one-day International cricket tournament which took place from 1 to 11 March 1990 in New Zealand. The host nation competed against Australia and India. Each side played each other twice before the two with the most points qualified for a place in the final. Australia won the tournament, defeating New Zealand in the final.

Australia was captained by Allan Border, India by Mohammad Azharuddin and New Zealand by John Wright. Martin Crowe replaced Wright as captain in the third and fourth matches, while Geoff Marsh replaced Border in the sixth match.

== Matches ==
=== Group stage ===
Team	P	W	L	T	NR	RR	Points
Australia	4	4	0	0	0	4.523	8
New Zealand	4	1	3	0	0	4.020	2
India	4	1	3	0	0	3.770	2

1 March 1990
Scorecard
Wisden report

New Zealand; 246/6 (47 overs)	v	India; 138 (32.1 overs)
MD Crowe 104 (135); AS Wassan 3/45 (10 overs)		WV Raman 32 (38); SA Thomson 3/19 (6 overs)

New Zealand won by 108 runs
Carisbrook, Dunedin
Umpires: BL Aldridge and RS Dunne
Player of the match: MD Crowe (NZ)

- India won the toss and elected to field.
- The match was reduced to 47 overs per side.
- GR Larsen, SJ Roberts and SA Thomson (all NZ), and SLV Raju and AS Wassan (both IND) made their ODI debuts.

3 March 1990
Scorecard
Wisden report

Australia; 187/9 (50 overs)	v	India; 169 (45 overs)
AR Border 37 (50); Kapil Dev 2/29 (10 overs)		DB Vengsarkar 35 (56); TM Alderman 5/32 (10 overs)

Australia won by 18 runs
Lancaster Park, Christchurch
Umpires: BL Aldridge and RL McHarg
Player of the match: TM Alderman (AUS)

- Australia won the toss and elected to bat.

4 March 1990
Scorecard
Wisden report

Australia; 244/8 (50 overs)	v	New Zealand; 94 (25.2 overs)
DM Jones 107 (143); MC Snedden 3/32 (10 overs)		AH Jones 43 (69); SP O'Donnell 5/13 (6 overs)

Australia won by 150 runs
Lancaster Park, Christchurch
Umpires: BL Aldridge and RL McHarg
Player of the match: DM Jones (AUS)

- Australia won the toss and elected to bat.

6 March 1990
Scorecard
Wisden report

India; 221 (48.2 overs)	v	New Zealand; 220 (48.5 overs)
Kapil Dev 46 (38); DK Morrison 3/33 (9 overs)		MJ Greatbatch 53 (70); M Prabhakar 3/37 (10 overs)

India won by 1 run
Basin Reserve, Wellington
Umpires: GIJ Cowan and SJ Woodward
Player of the match: Kapil Dev (IND)

- India won the toss and elected to bat.
- The match was reduced from 50 to 49 overs per side.

Sachin Tendulkar (IND) Made his ODI Debut.

8 March 1990
Scorecard
Wisden report

India; 211/8 (50 overs)	v	Australia; 212/3 (48 overs)
WV Raman 58 (86); PL Taylor 3/31 (10 overs)		GR Marsh 86 (144); ND Hirwani 1/25 (10 overs)

Australia won by 7 wickets
Seddon Park, Hamilton
Umpires: GIJ Cowan and RL McHarg
Player of the match: GR Marsh (AUS)

- India won the toss and elected to bat.
- Gursharan Singh (IND) made his ODI debut.

10 March 1990
Scorecard
Wisden report

Australia; 239/6 (47 overs)	v	New Zealand; 167/2 (34.5 overs)
DM Jones 59 (42); MC Snedden 2/45 (9 overs)		MD Crowe 51 retired hurt (81); PL Taylor 1/27 (7 overs)

Australia won on faster scoring rate
Eden Park, Auckland
Umpires: RS Dunne and SJ Woodward
Player of the match: DM Jones (AUS)

- New Zealand won the toss and elected to field.
- The Australia innings was reduced to 47 overs per side.
- The New Zealand target was reduced to 204 runs in 40 overs.

=== Final ===
11 March 1990
Scorecard
Wisden report

New Zealand; 162 (49.2 overs)	v	Australia; 164/2 (39.1 overs)
RJ Hadlee 79 (92); CG Rackemann 3/22 (10 overs)		DM Jones 102* (91); JG Bracewell 1/42 (10 overs)

Australia won by 8 wickets
Eden Park, Auckland
Umpires: RS Dunne and SJ Woodward
Player of the match: DM Jones (AUS)

- New Zealand won the toss and elected to bat.
