= English cricket team in India and Sri Lanka in 1984–85 =

International cricket tour

English cricket team in India in 1984-85
	India	England
- Dates: 13 November 1984 – 7 February 1985
Captains	Sunil Gavaskar	David Gower

Test series
- Result: England won the 5-match series 2–1
Most runs	Mohammad Azharuddin (439)	Mike Gatting (575)
Most wickets	L Sivaramakrishnan (23)	Neil Foster (14)

One Day International series
- Results: England won the 5-match series 4–1
Most runs	Ravi Shastri (223)	Mike Gatting (209)
Most wickets	Ravi Shastri (6)	Vic Marks (6)

The England national cricket team toured India in 1984–85, playing a five-match Test series and five match ODI series versus India. Shortly after they arrived in India, Prime Minister Indira Gandhi was assassinated; with cricket in India then out of the question for a few weeks, the English team went to Sri Lanka to play a couple of warm-up matches.

The tour was nearly called off after the Deputy High Commissioner of Western India, Percy Norris was shot dead on 27 November in Mumbai, the day after hosting a reception for the England team.

== Test Series ==
=== 1st Test ===
28 November–3 December 1984
Scorecard

England	v	India
195 (96.2 overs); Phil Edmonds 48 (81); Laxman Sivaramakrishnan 6/64 (31.2 overs)		465/8d (137 overs); Ravi Shastri 142 (323); Pat Pocock 3/133 (46 overs)
317 (135 overs); Mike Gatting 136 (255); Laxman Sivaramakrishnan 6/117 (46 overs)		51/2 (15.1 overs); Mohinder Amarnath 22* (27); Norman Cowans 1/18 (5 overs)

India won by 8 wickets
Wankhede Stadium, Bombay
Umpires: Bhairab Ganguli (Ind) and Swaroop Kishen (Ind)

- England won the toss and decided to bat.
- Chris Cowdrey and Tim Robinson (both Eng) made their debut in Tests.
- Laxman Sivaramakrishnan (Ind) claimed his first wicket in Tests.
- 30 November was a rest day.
- Mike Gatting (Eng) scored his first century in Tests.
- This was India's first win after 31 Tests.

=== 2nd Test ===
12–17 December 1984
Scorecard

India	v	England
307 (125.2 overs); Kapil Dev 60 (97); Richard Ellison 4/66 (26 overs)		418 (169.1 overs); Tim Robinson 160 (390); Laxman Sivaramakrishnan 6/99 (49.1 overs)
235 (103.4 overs); Sunil Gavaskar 65 (164); Phil Edmonds 4/60 (44 overs)		127/2 (23.4 overs); Allan Lamb 37* (38); Laxman Sivaramakrishnan 1/41 (8 overs)

England won by 8 wickets
Feroz Shah Kotla, Delhi
Umpires: Dara Dotiwalla (Ind) and Piloo Reporter (Ind)

- India won the toss and decided to bat.
- Manoj Prabhakar (Ind) made his debut in Tests.
- 14 December was a rest day.
- This was England's first win after 13 Tests, their then longest winless run in Tests.

=== 3rd Test ===
31 December 1984–5 January 1985
Scorecard

India	v	England
437/7d (200 overs); Ravi Shastri 111 (357); Phil Edmonds 3/72 (47 overs)		276 (100.3 overs); Allan Lamb 67 (102); Chetan Sharma 4/38 (12.3 overs)
29/1 (18 overs); Manoj Prabhakar 21 (56); Allan Lamb 1/6 (1 over)

Match drawn
Eden Gardens, Calcutta
Umpires: Bhairab Ganguli (Ind) and V. Vikramraju (Ind)

- India won the toss and decided to bat.
- Mohammad Azharuddin (Ind) scored a century on Test debut.
- Only 20 minutes of play was possible on day 2 due to smog and rain.
- 2 January was a rest day.
- Azharuddin and Ravi Shastri, in the first innings, broke the record for highest partnership for India for the fifth wicket in Tests (214 runs), before it was broken by Rahul Dravid and VVS Laxman in 2001.

=== 4th Test ===
13–18 January 1985
Scorecard

India	v	England
272 (67.5 overs); Mohinder Amarnath 78 (101); Neil Foster 6/104 (23 overs)		652/7d (175 overs); Mike Gatting 207 (309); Mohinder Amarnath 2/36 (12 overs)
412 (122.5 overs); Mohammad Azharuddin 105 (218); Neil Foster 5/59 (28 overs)		35/1 (8 overs); Tim Robinson 21* (26); Laxman Sivaramakrishnan 1/12 (4 overs)

England won by 9 wickets
MA Chidambaram Stadium, Madras
Umpires: Mahendra Gupte (Ind) and V. K. Ramaswamy (Ind)

- India won the toss and decided to bat.
- 16 January was a rest day.
- With Graeme Fowler's involvement in partnerships of 178 and 241 runs for the first and second wickets in England's first innings, both records for the country, he became the first player since Len Hutton in 1938 to be involved in such an instance in the same innings of a Test.
- This was also the first instance where two England players scored double-centuries in one innings of a Test.

=== 5th Test ===
31 January–5 February 1985
Scorecard

India	v	England
553/8d (165 overs); Dilip Vengsarkar 137 (255); Neil Foster 3/123 (36 overs)		417 (188.5 overs); Tim Robinson 96 (279); Kapil Dev 4/81 (36.5 overs)
97/1d (13 overs); Mohammad Azharuddin 54* (43); Mike Gatting 0/7 (1 over)		91/0 (36 overs); Mike Gatting 41* (59); Mohammad Azharuddin 0/8 (1 over)

Match drawn
Modi Stadium, Kanpur
Umpires: V. K. Ramaswamy (Ind) and Piloo Reporter (Ind)

- India won the toss and decided to bat.
- Gopal Sharma (Ind) made his debut in Tests.
- Mohammad Azharuddin (Ind) became the first player to score centuries in his first three Tests.
- India's first innings total of 553 was their highest against England in Tests.

== ODI series ==
England won the Charminar Challenge Cup 4–1.

=== 1st ODI ===
5 December 1984
Scorecard

India; 214/6 (45 overs)	v	England; 215/6 (43.2 overs)
DB Vengsarkar 105 (124); NA Foster 3/44 (10 overs)		MW Gatting 115* (135); M Prabhakar 1/27 (10 overs)

England won by 4 wickets
Nehru Stadium, Pune
Umpires: S Banerjee and MI Ghouse
Player of the match: DB Vengsarkar (IND) and MW Gatting (ENG)

- England won the toss and elected to field.
- The match was reduced to 45 overs per side.
- RS Ghai and KS More (both IND), and RM Ellison and RT Robinson (both ENG) made their ODI debuts.

=== 2nd ODI ===
27 December 1984
Scorecard

India; 252/5 (49 overs)	v	England; 241/6 (46 overs)
RJ Shastri 102 (142); VJ Marks 3/50 (8 overs)		MW Gatting 59 (86); RMH Binny 2/48 (7 overs)

England won by faster scoring rate
Barabati Stadium, Cuttack
Umpires: JD Ghosh and PG Pandit
Player of the match: RJ Shastri (IND)

- England won the toss and elected to field.
- The match was reduced to 49 overs per side.
- When play was halted England needed to have scored 237 runs to win.

=== 3rd ODI ===
20 January 1985
Scorecard

India; 205/6 (46 overs)	v	England; 206/7 (45 overs)
M Azharuddin 47* (37); VJ Marks 3/35 (10 overs)		AJ Lamb 59* (75); Kapil Dev 3/38 (10 overs)

England won by 3 wickets
M. Chinnaswamy Stadium, Bangalore
Umpires: SK Das and RV Ramani
Player of the match: AJ Lamb (ENG)

- England won the toss and elected to field.
- The match was reduced to 46 overs per side.
- M Azharuddin and S Viswanath (both IND) made their ODI debuts.

=== 4th ODI ===
23 January 1985
Scorecard

England; 240/7 (50 overs)	v	India; 241/7 (47.4 overs)
MD Moxon 70 (124); RJ Shastri 4/40 (10 overs)		Kapil Dev 54 (41); JP Agnew 3/38 (10 overs)

India won by 3 wickets
Vidarbha Cricket Association Ground, Nagpur
Umpires: R Mrithyunjayan and AL Narasimhan
Player of the match: Kapil Dev (IND)

- India won the toss and elected to field.
- JP Agnew, CS Cowdrey and MD Moxon (all ENG), and LS Rajput (IND) made their ODI debuts.

=== 5th ODI ===
27 January 1985
Scorecard

England; 121/6 (15 overs)	v	India; 114/5 (15 overs)
AJ Lamb 33* (19); TA Sekhar 3/23 (3 overs)		RJ Shastri 53 (45); PH Edmonds 2/20 (3 overs)

England won by 7 runs
Sector 16 Stadium, Chandigarh
Umpires: RB Gupta and BR Nagaraja Rao
Player of the match: RJ Shastri (IND)

- India won the toss and elected to field.
- The match was reduced before play started to 15 overs per side.
- BN French (ENG) made his ODI debut.
