= 1979–80 Australia Tri-Nation Series =

Benson & Hedges World Series Cup
- Date: 27 November 1979 – 22 January 1980
- Location: Australia
- Result: Won by West Indies; 2–0 in final series
- Player of the series: Gordon Greenidge (WI); Viv Richards (WI)
Teams
Australia	England	West Indies
Captains
Greg Chappell	Mike Brearley	Clive Lloyd
Most runs
Greg Chappell (309)	Geoffrey Boycott (425)	Viv Richards (485)
Most wickets
Dennis Lillee (20)	Ian Botham (12)	Andy Roberts (19)

The Benson & Hedges World Series Cup was a cricket tournament held in Australia from 27 November 1979 to 22 January 1980. It was a tri-nations series featuring Australia, England and the West Indies, with all of the matches being played as One Day Internationals (ODI). The series was part of the English and West Indian tour and was the first official tri-nations series after World Series Cricket.

After the round-robin matches which were played at four venues in Adelaide, Brisbane, Melbourne and Sydney. England and the West Indies reached the final where the West Indies won the final series 2–0. The red ball was used and the white pads were worn for the matches in Adelaide, Brisbane and Melbourne, and the white ball was used and the coloured pads were worn for the matches in Sydney. England and West Indies would not contest the tri-series again until the 1986-87 season.

== Points table ==
Pos	Team	Pld	W	L	T	NR	A	Pts	RR
1	England	8	5	2	0	0	1	11	4.178
2	West Indies	8	3	4	0	0	1	7	4.422
3	Australia	8	3	5	0	0	0	6	3.903

Source: CricketArchive

== Uniforms ==
Australia
Australia kit

England
England kit

West Indies
West Indies kit

== Fixtures ==
=== 1st match ===
27 November 1979 (D/N)
Scorecard

West Indies; 193 (49.3 overs)	v	Australia; 5/196 (47.1 overs)
Alvin Kallicharran 49 (94); Len Pascoe 4/29 (9.3 overs)		Greg Chappell 74* (100); Colin Croft 2/30 (10 overs)

Australia won by 5 wickets
Sydney Cricket Ground, Sydney
Umpires: Mick Harvey (Aus) and Richard Harris (Aus)
Player of the match: Greg Chappell (Aus)

- Australia won the toss and elected to field.
- Bruce Laird (Aus) made his ODI debut.
- White ball used. Coloured pads worn. First official D/N ODI after World Series Cricket
- Points: Australia 2, West Indies 0.

=== 2nd match ===
28 November 1979 (D/N)
Scorecard

England; 8/211 (50 overs)	v	West Indies; 196 (47 overs)
Peter Willey 58* (67); Joel Garner 3/31 (10 overs)		Lawrence Rowe 60 (89); Derek Underwood 4/44 (10 overs)

England won by 2 runs
Sydney Cricket Ground, Sydney
Umpires: Mick Harvey (Aus) and Arthur Watson (Aus)
Player of the match: Peter Willey (Eng)

- West Indies won the toss and elected to field.
- West Indies were set a revised target of 199 runs in 47 overs due to rain.
- Graham Dilley (Eng) made his ODI debut.
- White ball used. Coloured pads worn.
- Mike Brearley ordered his players, including wicket keeper David Bairstow, back to the boundary before the last ball was bowled. This controversial moment lead to the introduction of field restrictions and the field restriction circle for the 1980-81 season
- Points: England 2, West Indies 0.

=== 3rd match ===
8 December 1979
Scorecard

Australia; 9/207 (50 overs)	v	England; 209/7 (49 overs)
Greg Chappell 92 (115); Peter Willey 3/33 (8 overs)		Geoffrey Boycott 68 (85); Rodney Hogg 3/36 (10 overs)

England won by 3 wickets
Melbourne Cricket Ground, Melbourne
Umpires: William Copeland (Aus) and Dick French (Aus)
Player of the match: Greg Chappell (Aus)

- England won the toss and elected to field.
- Julien Wiener (Aus) made his ODI debut.
- Red ball used. White pads worn.
- Points: England 2, Australia 0.

=== 4th match ===
9 December 1979
Scorecard

West Indies; 2/271 (48 overs)	v	Australia; 8/191 (48 overs)
Viv Richards 153* (130); Jeff Thomson 1/43 (8 overs)		Allan Border 44 (58); Michael Holding 2/29 (10 overs)

West Indies won by 80 runs
Melbourne Cricket Ground, Melbourne
Umpires: Kevin Carmody (Aus) and Rex Whitehead (Aus)
Player of the match: Viv Richards (WI)

- Australia won the toss and elected to field.
- Match was reduced to 48 overs per side due to rain.
- Red ball used. White pads worn.
- Points: West Indies 2, Australia 0.

=== 5th match ===
11 December 1979 (D/N)
Scorecard

England; 7/264 (49 overs)	v	Australia; 192 (47.2 overs)
Geoffrey Boycott 105 (124); Dennis Lillee 4/56 (10 overs)		Trevor Laughlin 74 (97); Peter Willey 2/18 (5 overs)

England won by 72 runs
Sydney Cricket Ground, Sydney
Umpires: Lyndon Stevens (Aus) and Jack Collins (Aus)
Player of the match: Geoffrey Boycott (Eng)

- England won the toss and elected to bat.
- Match was reduced to 49 overs per side due to rain.
- White ball used. Coloured pads worn.
- Trevor Laughlin (Aus) played his final ODI match.
- Points: England 2, Australia 0.

=== 6th match ===
21 December 1979 (D/N)
Scorecard

Australia; 6/176 (50 overs)	v	West Indies; 169 (42.5 overs)
Ian Chappell 63* (65); Andy Roberts 1/28 (10 overs)		Viv Richards 62 (79); Dennis Lillee 4/28 (8.5 overs)

Australia won by 7 runs
Sydney Cricket Ground, Sydney
Umpires: Dick French (Aus) and Arthur Watson (Aus)
Player of the match: Ian Chappell (Aus)

- West Indies won the toss and elected to field.
- White ball used. Coloured pads worn.
- Points: Australia 2, West Indies 0.

=== 7th match ===
23 December 1979
Scorecard

England; 8/217 (50 overs)	v	West Indies; 1/218 (46.5 overs)
Geoffrey Boycott 68 (114); Andy Roberts 3/26 (10 overs)		Viv Richards 85* (77); Graham Gooch 1/38 (3.5 overs)

West Indies won by 9 wickets
The Gabba, Brisbane
Umpires: Mick Harvey (Aus) and Mel Johnson (Aus)
Player of the match: Gordon Greenidge (WI)

- West Indies won the toss and elected to field.
- First ever One Day International in Brisbane
- Red ball used. White pads worn.
- Points: West Indies 2, England 0.

=== 8th match ===
26 December 1979 (D/N)
Scorecard

Australia; 6/194 (47 overs)	v	England; 6/195 (45.1 overs)
Ian Chappell 60* (50); Ian Botham 2/33 (9 overs)		Geoffrey Boycott 86* (134); Rodney Hogg 4/46 (10 overs)

England won by 4 wickets
Sydney Cricket Ground, Sydney
Umpires: Peter Cronin (Aus) and Ray Isherwood (Aus)
Player of the match: Geoffrey Boycott (Eng)

- Australia won the toss and elected to bat.
- The match was reduced before play started to 47 overs per side.
- White ball used. Coloured pads worn.
- The next ODI to be played on Boxing Day would be in 1989 in Melbourne
- Points: England 2, Australia 0.

=== 9th match ===
12 January 1980
Scorecard

England	v	West Indies

Match abandoned
Melbourne Cricket Ground, Melbourne

- No toss.
- Match abandoned without a ball being bowled due to heavy rain.
- Red ball used. White pads worn.
- Points: England 1, West Indies 1.

=== 10th match ===
14 January 1980 (D/N)
Scorecard

Australia; 163 (48.4 overs)	v	England; 8/164 (48.5 overs)
Rick McCosker 41 (67); Graham Stevenson 4/33 (9.4 overs)		Graham Gooch 69 (123); Dennis Lillee 4/12 (10 overs)

England won by 2 wickets
Sydney Cricket Ground, Sydney
Umpires: Ray Isherwood (Aus) and Rex Whitehead (Aus)
Player of the match: Dennis Lillee (Aus)

- England won the toss and elected to field.
- John Emburey and Graham Stevenson (Eng) both made their ODI debuts.
- Ian Chappell played his final ODI match.
- White ball used. Coloured pads worn.
- Points: England 2, Australia 0.

=== 11th match ===
16 January 1980
Scorecard

West Indies; 5/246 (50 overs)	v	England; 139 (42.5 overs)
Viv Richards 88 (95); Ian Botham 2/35 (10 overs)		Wayne Larkins 24 (58); Andy Roberts 5/22 (10 overs)

West Indies won by 107 runs
Adelaide Oval, Adelaide
Umpires: Peter Cronin (Aus) and Gary Duperouzel (Aus)
Player of the match: Andy Roberts (WI)

- England won the toss and elected to field.
- Red ball used. White pads worn.
- Points: West Indies 2, England 0.

=== 12th match ===
18 January 1980 (D/N)
Scorecard

Australia; 190 (48.3 overs)	v	West Indies; 181 (49.1 overs)
Rick McCosker 95 (135); Michael Holding 4/17 (9.3 overs)		Alvin Kallicharran 66 (74); Dennis Lillee 3/17 (10 overs)

Australia won by 9 runs
Sydney Cricket Ground, Sydney
Umpires: Arthur Watson (Aus) and Kevin Carmody (Aus)
Player of the match: Rick McCosker (Aus)

- Australia won the toss and elected to bat.
- Dav Whatmore (Aus) played his only ODI match.
- Julien Wiener (Aus) played his final ODI match.
- White ball used. Coloured pads worn.
- Points: Australia 2, West Indies 0.

== Finals ==
=== 1st final ===
20 January 1980
Scorecard

West Indies; 8/215 (50 overs)	v	England; 7/213 (50 overs)
Gordon Greenidge 80 (132); Ian Botham 3/33 (10 overs)		Peter Willey 51* (91); Andy Roberts 3/30 (10 overs)

West Indies won by 2 runs
Melbourne Cricket Ground, Melbourne
Umpires: Mick Harvey (Aus) and Robin Bailhache (Aus)

- England won the toss and elected to field.
- Red ball used. White pads worn.

=== 2nd final ===
22 January 1980 (D/N)
Scorecard

England; 8/208 (50 overs)	v	West Indies; 2/209 (47.3 overs)
Geoffrey Boycott 63 (92); Andy Roberts 2/31 (10 overs)		Gordon Greenidge 98* (155); Ian Botham 1/28 (10 overs)

West Indies won by 8 wickets
Sydney Cricket Ground, Sydney
Umpires: Tony Crafter (Aus) and Max O'Connell (Aus)
Player of the match: Gordon Greenidge (WI)

- England won the toss and elected to bat.
- White ball used. Coloured pads worn.
- Mike Brearley (Eng) played his final ODI match.
- Viv Richards (WI) scored his 1,000th ODI run.
