= Pakistani cricket team in India in 1983–84 =

International cricket tour

Pakistan cricket team in India in 1979–80
- Date: 9 September 1983 - 11 October 1983
- Location: India
- Result: 3-Test series drawn
Teams
- India: Pakistan
Captains
- Kapil Dev: Zaheer Abbas
Most runs
- Anshuman Gaekwad (313) Sunil Gavaskar (264) Roger Binny (137): Javed Miandad (225); Wasim Raja (180); Zaheer Abbas (156)
Most wickets
- Kapil Dev (12) Ravi Shastri (8) Madan Lal (3): Azeem Hafeez (10); Tahir Naqqash (8); Mohammad Nazir (7)

The Pakistan national cricket team toured India in 1983–84 season. The two teams played three Tests. All the test matches were drawn. Both teams also played 2 ODI, India won both the matches.

== Test matches ==
=== 1st Test ===
14–19 September 1983
scorecard

India	v	Pakistan
275 (119.5 overs); Roger Binny 83; Tahir Naqqash 5/76 (34.5 overs)		288 (112.1 overs); Javed Miandad 99; Kapil Dev 5/68 (29 overs)
176/0 (61.1 overs); Sunil Gavaskar 103; Zaheer Abbas 0/3 (1 overs)

Match drawn
M Chinnaswamy Stadium, Bangalore
Umpires: MV Gothoskar, S Kishen
Player of the match: Madan Lal (IND)

- India won the toss and decided to bat

=== 2nd Test ===
24–29 September 1983
scorecard

Pakistan	v	India
337 (133.2 overs); Wasim Raja 125; Kapil Dev 4/80 (32 overs)		374 (169.5 overs); Anshuman Gaekwad 201; Wasim Raja 4/50 (28.5 overs)
16/0 (9 overs); Mohsin Khan 7 Madan Lal 0/1 (1 overs)

Match drawn
Gandhi Stadium, Jalandhar
Umpires: DN Dotiwalla, B Ganguli
Player of the match: Wasim Raja (PAK)

- India won the toss and decided to field

=== 3rd Test ===
5–10 October 1983
scorecard

India	v	Pakistan
245 (85.3 overs); Ravi Shastri 52; Azeem Hafeez 4/58 (27 overs)		322 (134.4 overs); Zaheer Abbas 85; Ravi Shastri 5/75 (30.4 overs)
262//8 d. (107 overs); Sunil Gavaskar 64; Mohammad Nazir 5/72 (50 overs)		42/1 (8 overs); Tahir Naqqash 18; Syed Kirmani 1/9 (2 overs)

Match drawn
Vidarbha Cricket Association Ground, Nagpur
Umpires: S. R. Bose, MG Subramaniam
Player of the match: Ravi Shastri

- India won the toss and decided to bat

== One Day Internationals (ODIs) ==
India won the wills series 2–0.

=== 1st ODI ===
10 September 1983
Scorecard

Pakistan; 151/8 (46 overs)	v	India; 152/6 (43 overs)
Javed Miandad 66* (110); BS Sandhu 3/27 (9 overs)		M Amarnath 60* (118); Mudassar Nazar 3/17 (10 overs)

India won by 4 wickets
Lal Bahadur Shastri Stadium, Hyderabad
Umpires: PG Pandit and MG Subramaniam
Player of the match: M Amarnath (IND)

- India won the toss and elected to field.
- The match was reduced from 50 overs to 46 overs.
- Azeem Hafeez and Qasim Umar (both PAK) made their ODI debuts.

=== 2nd ODI ===
2 October 1983
Scorecard

Pakistan; 166/9 (46 overs)	v	India; 169/6 (40.4 overs)
Zaheer Abbas 48 (59); Madan Lal 3/27 (10 overs)		SM Patil 51 (28); Mohammad Nazir 2/37 (10 overs)

India won by 4 wickets
Sawai Mansingh Stadium, Jaipur
Umpires: SR Bose and R Mehra
Player of the match: SM Patil (IND)

- India won the toss and elected to field.
- The match was reduced from 50 overs to 46 overs.
