= International cricket in 1987–88 =

International cricket season

The 1987–88 international cricket season was from September 1987 to April 1988.

== Season overview ==
International tours
Start date	Home team	Away team	Results [Matches]			
Start date	Home team	Away team	Test	ODI	FC	LA
18 November 1987	Pakistan	England	1–0 [3]	3–0 [3]	—	—
25 November 1987	India	West Indies	1–1 [4]	1–6 [7]	—	—
4 December 1987	Australia	New Zealand	1–0 [3]	—	—	—
29 January 1988	Australia	England	0–0 [1]	1–0 [1]	—	—
12 February 1988	New Zealand	England	0–0 [3]	2–2 [4]	—	—
12 February 1988	Australia	Sri Lanka	1–0 [1]	—	—	—
12 March 1988	West Indies	Pakistan	1–1 [3]	5–0 [5]	—	—
International tournaments
Start date	Tournament				Winners	
8 October 1987	(India) (Pakistan) 1987 Reliance World Cup				Australia	
2 January 1988	(Australia) 1987–88 Benson & Hedges World Series				Australia	
25 March 1988	(United Arab Emirates) 1987-88 Sharjah Cup				India	

== October ==
=== 1987 Cricket World Cup ===
Pos	Team	Pld	W	L	T	NR	Pts	RR
1	India	6	5	1	0	0	20	5.413
2	Australia	6	5	1	0	0	20	5.193
3	New Zealand	6	2	4	0	0	8	4.887
4	Zimbabwe	6	0	6	0	0	0	3.757

Source: ESPNcricinfo, The Age

Pos	Team	Pld	W	L	T	NR	Pts	RR
1	Pakistan	6	5	1	0	0	20	5.007
2	England	6	4	2	0	0	16	5.140
3	West Indies	6	3	3	0	0	12	5.160
4	Sri Lanka	6	0	6	0	0	0	4.041

Source: ESPNcricinfo, The Age

Group stage
No.	Date	Team 1	Captain 1	Team 2	Captain 2	Venue	Result
ODI 451	8 October	Pakistan	Imran Khan	Sri Lanka	Duleep Mendis	Niaz Stadium, Hyderabad	Pakistan by 15 runs
ODI 452	9 October	England	Mike Gatting	West Indies	Viv Richards	Jinnah Stadium, Gujranwala	England by 2 wickets
ODI 453	9 October	India	Kapil Dev	Australia	Allan Border	MA Chidambaram Stadium, Chennai	Australia by 1 run
ODI 454	10 October	New Zealand	Jeff Crowe	Zimbabwe	John Traicos	Lal Bahadur Shastri Stadium, Hyderabad	New Zealand by 3 runs
ODI 455	12–13 October	Pakistan	Imran Khan	England	Mike Gatting	Pindi Club Ground, Rawalpindi	Pakistan by 18 runs
ODI 456	13 October	Australia	Allan Border	Zimbabwe	John Traicos	MA Chidambaram Stadium, Chennai	Australia by 96 runs
ODI 457	13 October	Sri Lanka	Viv Richards	West Indies	Duleep Mendis	National Stadium, Karachi	West Indies by 191 runs
ODI 458	14 October	India	Kapil Dev	New Zealand	Jeff Crowe	M.Chinnaswamy Stadium, Bengaluru	India by 16 runs
ODI 459	16 October	Pakistan	Imran Khan	West Indies	Viv Richards	Gaddafi Stadium, Lahore	Pakistan by 1 wicket
ODI 460	17 October	England	Mike Gatting	Sri Lanka	Duleep Mendis	Arbab Niaz Stadium, Peshawar	England by 108 runs
ODI 461	17 October	India	Kapil Dev	Zimbabwe	John Traicos	Wankhede Stadium, Mumbai	India by 8 wickets
ODI 462	18–19 October	Australia	Allan Border	New Zealand	Jeff Crowe	Nehru Stadium, Indore	Australia by 3 runs
ODI 463	20 October	Pakistan	Imran Khan	England	Mike Gatting	National Stadium, Karachi	Pakistan by 7 wickets
ODI 464	21 October	Sri Lanka	Duleep Mendis	West Indies	Viv Richards	Green Park, Kanpur	West Indies by 25 runs
ODI 465	22 October	India	Kapil Dev	Australia	Allan Border	Arun Jaitley Stadium, Delhi	India by 56 runs
ODI 466	23 October	New Zealand	Jeff Crowe	Zimbabwe	John Traicos	Eden Gardens, Kolkata	New Zealand by 4 wickets
ODI 467	25 October	Pakistan	Imran Khan	Sri Lanka	Duleep Mendis	Iqbal Stadium, Faisalabad	Pakistan by 113 runs
ODI 468	26 October	England	Mike Gatting	West Indies	Viv Richards	Sawai Mansingh Stadium, Jaipur	England by 34 runs
ODI 469	26 October	India	Kapil Dev	Zimbabwe	John Traicos	Sardar Patel Stadium, Ahmedabad	India by 7 wickets
ODI 470	27 October	Australia	Allan Border	New Zealand	Jeff Crowe	Sector 16 Stadium, Chandigarh	Australia by 7 wickets
ODI 471	30 October	Australia	Allan Border	Zimbabwe	John Traicos	Barabati Stadium, Cuttack	Australia by 70 runs
ODI 472	30 October	England	Mike Gatting	Sri Lanka	Duleep Mendis	Nehru Stadium, Pune	England by 8 wickets
ODI 473	30 October	Pakistan	Imran Khan	West Indies	Viv Richards	Karachi, Karachi	West Indies by 28 runs
ODI 474	31 October	India	Kapil Dev	New Zealand	Jeff Crowe	Vidarbha C.A. Ground, Nagpur	India by 9 wickets
Semi-Finals
No.	Date	Team 1	Captain 1	Team 2	Captain 2	Venue	Result
ODI 475	4 November	Pakistan	Imran Khan	Australia	Allan Border	Gaddafi Stadium, Lahore	Australia by 18 runs
ODI 476	5 November	India	Kapil Dev	England	Mike Gatting	Wankhede Stadium, Mumbai	England by 35 runs
Final
No.	Date	Team 1	Captain 1	Team 2	Captain 2	Venue	Result
ODI 477	8 November	Australia	Allan Border	England	Mike Gatting	Eden Gardens, Kolkata	Australia by 7 runs

== November ==
=== England in Pakistan ===
ODI Series
No.	Date	Home captain	Away captain	Venue	Result
ODI 478	18 November	Abdul Qadir	Mike Gatting	Gaddafi Stadium, Lahore	England by 2 wickets
ODI 479	20 November	Abdul Qadir	Mike Gatting	National Stadium, Karachi	England by 23 runs
ODI 480	22 November	Abdul Qadir	Mike Gatting	Arbab Niaz Stadium, Peshawar	England by 98 runs
Test Series
No.	Date	Home captain	Away captain	Venue	Result
Test 1081	25–28 November	Javed Miandad	Mike Gatting	Gaddafi Stadium, Lahore	Pakistan by an innings and 87 runs
Test 1083	7–12 December	Javed Miandad	Mike Gatting	Iqbal Stadium, Faisalabad	Match drawn
Test 1086	16–21 December	Javed Miandad	Mike Gatting	National Stadium, Karachi	Match drawn

=== West Indies in India ===
Test Series
No.	Date	Home captain	Away captain	Venue	Result
Test 1080	25–29 November	Dilip Vengsarkar	Vivian Richards	Feroz Shah Kotla, Delhi	West Indies by 5 wickets
Test 1085	11–16 December	Dilip Vengsarkar	Vivian Richards	Wankhede Stadium, Mumbai	Match drawn
Test 1088	26–31 December	Dilip Vengsarkar	Vivian Richards	Eden Gardens, Kolkata	Match drawn
Test 1089	11–15 January	Ravi Shastri	Vivian Richards	MA Chidambaram Stadium, Chennai	India by 255 runs
ODI Series
No.	Date	Home captain	Away captain	Venue	Result
ODI 481	8 December	Dilip Vengsarkar	Vivian Richards	Vidarbha Cricket Association Ground, Nagpur	West Indies by 10 runs
ODI 482	23 December	Dilip Vengsarkar	Vivian Richards	Nehru Stadium, Guwahati	West Indies by 52 runs
ODI 483	2 January	Dilip Vengsarkar	Vivian Richards	Eden Gardens, Kolkata	India by 56 runs
ODI 487	5 January	Ravi Shastri	Vivian Richards	Madhavrao Scindia Cricket Ground, Rajkot	West Indies by 6 wickets
ODI 497	19 January	Ravi Shastri	Vivian Richards	Nahar Singh Stadium, Faridabad	West Indies by 4 wickets
ODI 500	22 January	Ravi Shastri	Vivian Richards	Captain Roop Singh Stadium, Gwalior	West Indies by 73 runs
ODI 502	25 January	Ravi Shastri	Vivian Richards	University Stadium, Trivandrum	West Indies by 9 wickets
One-off ODI match
No.	Date	Home captain	Away captain	Venue	Result
ODI 489	7 January	Ravi Shastri	Vivian Richards	Sardar Patel Stadium, Ahmedabad	West Indies by 2 runs

== December ==
=== New Zealand in Australia ===
Trans-Tasman Trophy - Test Series
No.	Date	Home captain	Away captain	Venue	Result
Test 1082	4–7 December	Allan Border	Jeff Crowe	The Gabba, Brisbane	Australia by 9 wickets
Test 1084	11–15 December	Allan Border	Jeff Crowe	Adelaide Oval, Adelaide	Match drawn
Test 1087	26–30 December	Allan Border	Jeff Crowe	Melbourne Cricket Ground, Melbourne	Match drawn

== January ==
=== 1987–88 Benson & Hedges World Series ===
Group stage
No.	Date	Team 1	Captain 1	Team 2	Captain 2	Venue	Result
ODI 484	2 January	Australia	Allan Border	Sri Lanka	Ranjan Madugalle	WACA Ground, Perth	Australia by 81 runs
ODI 485	3 January	Australia	Allan Border	New Zealand	Jeff Crowe	WACA Ground, Perth	New Zealand by 1 run
ODI 486	5 January	New Zealand	Jeff Crowe	Sri Lanka	Ranjan Madugalle	Sydney Cricket Ground, Sydney	New Zealand by 6 wickets
ODI 488	7 January	Australia	Allan Border	New Zealand	Jeff Crowe	Melbourne Cricket Ground, Melbourne	Australia by 6 runs
ODI 490	9 January	New Zealand	John Wright	Sri Lanka	Ranjan Madugalle	Adelaide Oval, Adelaide	New Zealand by 4 wickets
ODI 491	10 January	Australia	Allan Border	Sri Lanka	Ranjan Madugalle	Adelaide Oval, Adelaide	Australia by 81 runs
ODI 492	12 January	New Zealand	Jeff Crowe	Sri Lanka	Ranjan Madugalle	Bellerive Oval, Hobart	Sri Lanka by 4 wickets
ODI 493	14 January	Australia	Allan Border	Sri Lanka	Ranjan Madugalle	Melbourne Cricket Ground, Melbourne	Australia by 38 runs
ODI 494	16 January	New Zealand	John Wright	Sri Lanka	Ranjan Madugalle	Brisbane Cricket Ground, Brisbane	New Zealand by 4 wickets
ODI 495	17 January	Australia	Allan Border	New Zealand	Jeff Crowe	Brisbane Cricket Ground, Brisbane	Australia by 5 wickets
ODI 496	19 January	Australia	Allan Border	Sri Lanka	Ranjan Madugalle	Sydney Cricket Ground, Sydney	Australia by 3 wickets
ODI 498	20 January	Australia	Allan Border	New Zealand	Jeff Crowe	Sydney Cricket Ground, Sydney	Australia by 78 runs
Final
ODI 499	22 January	Australia	Allan Border	New Zealand	Jeff Crowe	Melbourne Cricket Ground, Melbourne	Australia by 22 runs
ODI 501	24 January	Australia	Allan Border	New Zealand	Jeff Crowe	Sydney Cricket Ground, Sydney	Australia by 6 wickets

=== England in Australia ===
Bicentennial Test Match
No.	Date	Home captain	Away captain	Venue	Result
Test 1090	29 January–2 February	Allan Border	Mike Gatting	Sydney Cricket Ground, Sydney	Match drawn
Bicentenary ODI Match
No.	Date	Home captain	Away captain	Venue	Result
ODI 503	4 February	Allan Border	Mike Gatting	Melbourne Cricket Ground, Melbourne	Australia by 22 runs

== February ==
=== England in New Zealand ===
Test Series
No.	Date	Home captain	Away captain	Venue	Result
Test 1091	12–17 February	Jeff Crowe	Mike Gatting	Lancaster Park, Christchurch	Match drawn
Test 1093	25–29 February	Jeff Crowe	Mike Gatting	Eden Park, Auckland	Match drawn
Test 1094	3–7 March	John Wright	Mike Gatting	Basin Reserve, Wellington	Match drawn
ODI Series
No.	Date	Home captain	Away captain	Venue	Result
ODI 504	9 March	John Wright	Mike Gatting	Carisbrook, Dunedin	England by 5 wickets
ODI 505	12 March	John Wright	Mike Gatting	AMI Stadium, Christchurch	England by 6 wickets
ODI 508	16 March	John Wright	Mike Gatting	McLean Park, Napier	New Zealand by 7 wickets
ODI 510	19 March	John Wright	Mike Gatting	Eden Park, Auckland	New Zealand by 4 wickets

=== Sri Lanka in Australia ===
One-off Test match
No.	Date	Home captain	Away captain	Venue	Result
Test 1092	12–15 February	Allan Border	Ranjan Madugalle	WACA Ground, Perth	Australia by an innings and 108 runs

== March ==
=== Pakistan in West Indies ===
ODI Series
No.	Date	Home captain	Away captain	Venue	Result
ODI 506	12 March	Viv Richards	Imran Khan	Sabina Park, Kingston	West Indies by 47 runs
ODI 507	15 March	Gordon Greenidge	Imran Khan	Antigua Recreation Ground, St John's	West Indies by 5 wickets
ODI 509	18 March	Gordon Greenidge	Imran Khan	Queen's Park Oval, Port of Spain	West Indies by 50 runs
ODI 511	20 March	Gordon Greenidge	Imran Khan	Queen's Park Oval, Port of Spain	West Indies by 7 wickets
ODI 515	30 March	Gordon Greenidge	Imran Khan	Bourda, Georgetown	West Indies by 7 wickets
Test Series
No.	Date	Home captain	Away captain	Venue	Result
Test 1095	2–6 April	Gordon Greenidge	Imran Khan	Bourda, Georgetown	Pakistan by 9 wickets
Test 1096	14–19 April	Viv Richards	Imran Khan	Queen's Park Oval, Port of Spain	Match drawn
Test 1097	22–27 April	Viv Richards	Imran Khan	Kensington Oval, Bridgetown	West Indies by 2 wickets

=== 1988 Sharjah Cup ===
Team	P	W	L	T	NR	RR	Points
India	2	2	0	0	0	4.86	8
New Zealand	2	1	1	0	0	4.52	4
Sri Lanka	2	0	2	0	0	3.60	0

Group stage
No.	Date	Team 1	Captain 1	Team 2	Captain 2	Venue	Result
ODI 512	25 March	India	Ravi Shastri	Sri Lanka	Ranjan Madugalle	Sharjah Cricket Stadium, Sharjah	India by 18 runs
ODI 513	27 March	India	Ravi Shastri	New Zealand	John Wright	Sharjah Cricket Stadium, Sharjah	India by 73 runs
ODI 514	29 March	New Zealand	John Wright	Sri Lanka	Ranjan Madugalle	Sharjah Cricket Stadium, Sharjah	New Zealand by 99 runs
Semi-Final
No.	Date	Team 1	Captain 1	Team 2	Captain 2	Venue	Result
ODI 516	31 March	New Zealand	John Wright	Sri Lanka	Ranjan Madugalle	Sharjah Cricket Stadium, Sharjah	New Zealand by 43 runs
Final
No.	Date	Team 1	Captain 1	Team 2	Captain 2	Venue	Result
ODI 517	1 April	India	Ravi Shastri	New Zealand	John Wright	Sharjah Cricket Stadium, Sharjah	India by 52 runs
