= International cricket in 1979–80 =

International cricket season

The 1979–80 international cricket season was from September 1979 to April 1980.

== Season overview ==
International tours
Start date	Home team	Away team	Results [Matches]			
Start date	Home team	Away team	Test	ODI	FC	LA
11 September 1979	India	Australia	2–0 [6]	—	—	—
21 November 1979	India	Pakistan	2–0 [6]	—	—	—
1 December 1979	Australia	West Indies	0–2 [3]	—	—	—
14 December 1979	Australia	England	3–0 [3]	—	—	—
6 February 1980	New Zealand	West Indies	1–0 [3]	1–0 [1]	—	—
15 February 1980	India	England	0–1 [1]	—	—	—
27 February 1980	Pakistan	Australia	1–0 [3]	—	—	—
International tournaments
Start date	Tournament				Winners	
23 November 1980	(Australia) 1979–80 Benson & Hedges World Series				West Indies	

== September ==
=== Australia in India ===
Test series
No.	Date	Home captain	Away captain	Venue	Result
Test 855	11–16 September	Sunil Gavaskar	Kim Hughes	Madras Cricket Club Ground, Madras	Match drawn
Test 856	19–24 September	Sunil Gavaskar	Kim Hughes	Karnataka State Cricket Association Stadium, Bangalore	Match drawn
Test 857	2–7 October	Sunil Gavaskar	Kim Hughes	Green Park, Kanpur	India by 153 runs
Test 858	13–18 October	Sunil Gavaskar	Kim Hughes	Feroz Shah Kotla Ground, Delhi	Match drawn
Test 859	26–31 October	Sunil Gavaskar	Kim Hughes	Eden Gardens, Calcutta	Match drawn
Test 886	3–7 November	Sunil Gavaskar	Kim Hughes	Wankhede Stadium, Bombay	India by an innings and 100 runs

== November ==
=== Pakistan in India ===
Test series
No.	Date	Home captain	Away captain	Venue	Result
Test 861	21–26 November	Sunil Gavaskar	Asif Iqbal	Karnataka State Cricket Association Stadium, Bangalore	Match drawn
Test 863	4–9 December	Sunil Gavaskar	Asif Iqbal	Feroz Shah Kotla Ground, Delhi	Match drawn
Test 865	16–20 December	Sunil Gavaskar	Asif Iqbal	Wankhede Stadium, Bombay	India by 131 runs
Test 866	25–30 December	Sunil Gavaskar	Asif Iqbal	Green Park, Kanpur	Match drawn
Test 869	15–20 January	Sunil Gavaskar	Asif Iqbal	Madras Cricket Club Ground, Madras	India by 10 wickets
Test 871	29 Jan–3 February	Gundappa Viswanath	Asif Iqbal	Eden Gardens, Calcutta	Match drawn

=== 1979–80 Benson & Hedges World Series ===
Pos	Team	Pld	W	L	T	NR	A	Pts	RR
1	England	8	5	2	0	0	1	11	4.178
2	West Indies	8	3	4	0	0	1	7	4.422
3	Australia	8	3	5	0	0	0	6	3.903

Source: CricketArchive

Group stage
No.	Date	Team 1	Captain 1	Team 2	Captain 2	Venue	Result
ODI 7	27 November	Australia	Greg Chappell	West Indies	Clive Lloyd	Sydney Cricket Ground, Sydney	Australia by 5 wickets
ODI 76	28 November	England	Mike Brearley	West Indies	Clive Lloyd	Sydney Cricket Ground, Sydney	England by 2 runs
ODI 77	8 December	Australia	Greg Chappell	England	Mike Brearley	Melbourne Cricket Ground, Melbourne	England by 3 wickets
ODI 78	9 December	Australia	Greg Chappell	West Indies	Deryck Murray	Melbourne Cricket Ground, Melbourne	West Indies by 80 runs
ODI 79	11 December	Australia	Greg Chappell	England	Mike Brearley	Sydney Cricket Ground, Sydney	England by 72 runs
ODI 80	21 December	Australia	Greg Chappell	West Indies	Clive Lloyd	Sydney Cricket Ground, Sydney	Australia by 7 runs
ODI 81	23 December	England	Mike Brearley	West Indies	Clive Lloyd	The Gabba, Brisbane	West Indies by 9 wickets
ODI 82	26 December	Australia	Greg Chappell	England	Mike Brearley	Sydney Cricket Ground, Sydney	England by 4 wickets
ODI 82a	12 January	England	Mike Brearley	West Indies	Clive Lloyd	Melbourne Cricket Ground, Melbourne	Match abandoned
ODI 83	14 January	Australia	Greg Chappell	England	Mike Brearley	Sydney Cricket Ground, Sydney	England by 2 wickets
ODI 84	16 January	England	Mike Brearley	West Indies	Clive Lloyd	Adelaide Oval, Adelaide	West Indies by 107 runs
ODI 85	18 January	Australia	Greg Chappell	West Indies	Clive Lloyd	Sydney Cricket Ground, Sydney	Australia by 9 runs
Finals
No.	Date	Team 1	Captain 1	Team 2	Captain 2	Venue	Result
ODI 86	22 January	England	Mike Brearley	West Indies	Clive Lloyd	Melbourne Cricket Ground, Melbourne	West Indies by 2 runs
ODI 87	20 January	England	Mike Brearley	West Indies	Clive Lloyd	Sydney Cricket Ground, Sydney	West Indies by 8 wickets

== December ==
=== West Indies in Australia ===
Frank Worrell Trophy Test series
No.	Date	Home captain	Away captain	Venue	Result
Test 862	1–5 December	Greg Chappell	Deryck Murray	The Gabba, Brisbane	Match drawn
Test 867	29 Dec–1 January	Greg Chappell	Clive Lloyd	Melbourne Cricket Ground, Melbourne	West Indies by 10 wickets
Test 870	26–30 January	Greg Chappell	Clive Lloyd	Adelaide Oval, Adelaide	West Indies by 408 runs

=== England in Australia ===
Test series
No.	Date	Home captain	Away captain	Venue	Result
Test 864	14–19 December	Greg Chappell	Mike Brearley	WACA Ground, Perth	Australia by 138 runs
Test 868	4–8 January	Greg Chappell	Mike Brearley	Sydney Cricket Ground, Sydney	Australia by 6 wickets
Test 872	1–6 February	Greg Chappell	Mike Brearley	Melbourne Cricket Ground, Melbourne	Australia by 8 wickets

== February ==
=== West Indies in New Zealand ===
One-off ODI Match
No.	Date	Home captain	Away captain	Venue	Result
Test 88	6 February	Geoff Howarth	Clive Lloyd	AMI Stadium, Christchurch	New Zealand by 1 wicket
Test series
No.	Date	Home captain	Away captain	Venue	Result
Test 873	8–13 February	Geoff Howarth	Clive Lloyd	Carisbrook, Dunedin	New Zealand by 1 wicket
Test 875	22–27 February	Geoff Howarth	Clive Lloyd	AMI Stadium, Christchurch	Match drawn
Test 877	29 Feb–5 March	Geoff Howarth	Clive Lloyd	Eden Park, Auckland	Match drawn

=== England in India ===
Golden Jubilee Test Match
No.	Date	Home captain	Away captain	Venue	Result
Test 874	15–19 February	Gundappa Viswanath	Mike Brearley	Wankhede Stadium, Bombay	England by 10 wickets

=== Australia in Pakistan ===
Test series
No.	Date	Home captain	Away captain	Venue	Result
Test 876	27 Feb–2 March	Javed Miandad	Greg Chappell	National Stadium, Karachi	Pakistan by 7 wickets
Test 878	6–11 March	Javed Miandad	Greg Chappell	Iqbal Stadium, Faisalabad	Match drawn
Test 879	18–23 March	Javed Miandad	Greg Chappell	Gaddafi Stadium, Lahore	Match drawn
