= Allan Wright (farmer) =

New Zealand farming leader (1929–2022)

Sir Allan Wright KBE
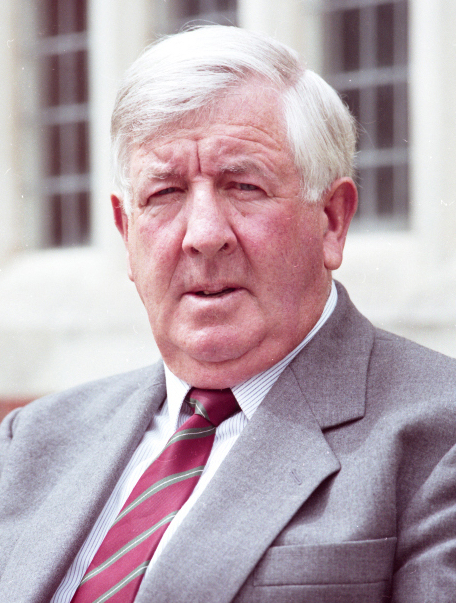
- Wright in 1993

President of Federated Farmers
- In office 1977–1981
- Preceded by: John Kneebone
- Succeeded by: Rob Storey

5th Chair of Lincoln College Council
- In office 1986–1989
- Preceded by: Sid Hurst
- Succeeded by: Position abolished

1st Chancellor of Lincoln University
- In office 1990–1994
- Succeeded by: Malcolm Cameron

Personal details
- Born: Allan Frederick Wright; 25 March 1929 Darfield, New Zealand
- Died: 27 November 2022 (aged 93)
- Spouse: Dorothy June Netting (m. 1953)
- Children: 5
- Relatives: Geoff Wright (brother); John Wright (nephew)
- Education: Christ's College
- Occupation: Farmer

Sir Allan Frederick Wright KBE (25 March 1929 – 27 November 2022) was a New Zealand farming leader and businessman. He was president of Federated Farmers between 1977 and 1981, and served as the first chancellor of Lincoln University.

== Early life and family ==
Wright was born in Darfield, Canterbury, on 25 March 1929, one of twin sons born to Quentin Alford Wright and Winifred Annie Wright (née Jarman). He was educated at Christ's College, Christchurch. On 22 January 1953, he married Dorothy June Netting at St Paul's Anglican Church, Papanui, and the couple went on to have five children.

Wright's twin brother, Geoff, played first-class cricket for Canterbury, and was the father of New Zealand Test cricket captain John Wright.

== Career ==
Wright started farming a mixed arable farm near Sheffield in 1946. He joined the Sheffield Young Farmers' Club in 1949, and went on to serve as the national president of Young Farmers' Clubs in 1958. In 1973, Wright won the A. C. Cameron Royal Agricultural Society gold medal for excellence in farming.

Active in the North Canterbury branch of Federated Farmers, Wright served as chairman of the meat and wool section from 1967 to 1971, and president between 1971 and 1974. At a national level, he was senior vice chairman of the meat and wool section of Federated Farmers from 1971 to 1972, junior vice president in 1973, senior vice president from 1974 to 1976, and president of Federated Farmers of New Zealand between 1977 and 1981. In the 1982 New Year Honours, Wright was appointed a Knight Commander of the Order of the British Empire, in recognition of his service as president of Federated Farmers.

Wright was appointed a government representative on the Lincoln College Council in 1973, and became chair of the council in 1986. When Lincoln gained full autonomy as a university at the beginning of 1990, Wright became the inaugural chancellor of the university, serving in that role until 1994. His term as chairman and chancellor was characterised by significant roll growth and an increasing diversity in courses offered at Lincoln, with a consensus leadership style.

Wright held many governance roles in business. He was director of companies including Southpower, Alliance Textiles, New Zealand Rail, the Rural Bank, the Trigon packaging group, and FMG Insurance.

== Cricket ==
Wright played for the Canterbury Country cricket team and was the first of their players to score 1,000 runs and take 100 wickets. He helped to establish the North Canterbury Cricket Association and led its representative team in its first Hawke Cup campaign in 1967. He later served as selector, board member, chairman and president of Canterbury Country.

Wright served as a board member of the New Zealand Cricket Council from 1968 to 1990. He was elected president of New Zealand Cricket in 1993, and was honoured by being made a life member of the organisation at the end of his term in office. He managed several New Zealand national teams at home and on tour, including the 1983 tour to England.

== Later life and death ==
At the time of his death, on 27 November 2022 at the age of 93, Wright was patron of the Canterbury Country District Association. His wife, June, Lady Wright, died on 30 August 2024.
