= S. T. Sambandam =

Indian cricket umpire

Personal information
- Full name: S. T. Sambandam

Umpiring information
- ODIs umpired: 1 (1990)
- Source: Cricinfo, 29 May 2014

S. T. Sambandam is a former Indian cricket umpire.

In addition to officiating in Indian domestic cricket matches, he also stood in one ODI game in 1990.

== See also ==
- List of One Day International cricket umpires
