= Taufeeq Khan =

Pakistani cricket umpire

Personal information
- Full name: Taufeeq Khan

Umpiring information
- ODIs umpired: 1 (1992)
- Source: Cricinfo, 25 May 2014

Taufeeq Khan is a Pakistani former cricket umpire. Besides officiating in first-class fixtures at the domestic level, he stood in one ODI game in 1992.

== See also ==
- List of One Day International cricket umpires
