= Sukha Bose =

Indian cricket umpire (1930–2008)

Personal information
- Born: 1 November 1930; Jamshedpur, India
- Died: 12 October 2008 (aged 77); Kolkata, India

Umpiring information
- Tests umpired: 1 (1983)
- ODIs umpired: 2 (1983–1984)
- WODIs umpired: 1 (1978)
- Source: Cricinfo, 24 April 2017

Sukha Bose (1 November 1930 – 12 October 2008) was an Indian cricket umpire. He stood in one Test match, between India and Pakistan, in 1983, and two ODI games, in 1983 and 1984.

== See also ==
- List of Test cricket umpires
- List of One Day International cricket umpires
- Pakistani cricket team in India in 1983–84
