= Geoff Wright (cricketer) =

New Zealand cricketer

Personal information
- Full name: Geoffrey Thomas Wright
- Born: 25 March 1929; Darfield, Canterbury, New Zealand
- Died: 2 April 2003 (aged 74); Christchurch, New Zealand
- Relatives: John Wright (son); Allan Wright (brother)
- Source: Cricinfo, 22 October 2020

Geoffrey Thomas Wright (25 March 1929 – 2 April 2003) was a New Zealand cricketer. He played in one first-class match for Canterbury in 1955/56. His son John played Test cricket for New Zealand.

== See also ==
- List of Canterbury representative cricketers
