= List of One Day International cricket umpires =

List of cricket umpires

This is a list of cricket umpires who have officiated at least one men's One Day International (ODI) match. As of October 2022, 418 umpires have officiated in an ODI match. The first ODI match took place on 5 January 1971 between Australia and England at the Melbourne Cricket Ground. The umpires for this game were Tom Brooks and Lou Rowan. In April 2019, Claire Polosak became the first woman to stand in a men's ODI match, when she was one of the on-field umpires for the final of the 2019 ICC World Cricket League Division Two tournament. Three umpires, Rudi Koertzen of South Africa, Billy Bowden of New Zealand and Aleem Dar of Pakistan, have officiated in 200 or more ODI matches.

On 1 November 2020, in the second ODI between Pakistan and Zimbabwe, Pakistan's Aleem Dar stood in his 210th ODI match as an on-field umpire, surpassing South African Rudi Koertzen's record of officiating in the most ODI matches.

== List of umpires ==
Umpire	Country	ODIs	From	To
Gerard Abood	Australia	2	2018	2020
Faisal Afridi	Pakistan	1	2023	2023
Afzaal Ahmed	Pakistan	1	1994	1994
Mesbahuddin Ahmed	Bangladesh	1	2002	2002
Tanvir Ahmed	Bangladesh	4	2021	2022
Javed Akhtar	Pakistan	40	1976	1999
A. F. M. Akhtaruddin	Bangladesh	16	2001	2006
Rizwan Akram	Netherlands	6	2018	2022
Jahangir Alam	Bangladesh	3	2001	2002
Brian Aldridge	New Zealand	45	1986	1995
Agha Saadat Ali	Pakistan	1	1978	1978
Akbar Ali	United Arab Emirates	22	2017	2022
Iftikhar Ali	United Arab Emirates	9	2017	2019
Masroor Ali	Pakistan	1	1986	1986
Bill Alley	England	9	1974	1981
Phillip Alleyne	West Indies	1	1978	1978
Ignatius Anandappa	Sri Lanka	7	1992	1998
K. N. Ananthapadmanabhan	India	2	2021	2022
Basil Anthony	Sri Lanka	2	1982	1983
David Archer	West Indies	24	1981	1991
Rahul Asher	Oman	12	2020	2021
Sudhir Asnani	India	10	1998	2013
Tariq Ata	Pakistan	6	1982	1988
Khalid Aziz	Pakistan	7	1977	1993
Vinod Babu	Oman	9	2020	2022
Saleem Badar	Pakistan	29	1988	2002
Niels Bagh	Denmark	18	2008	2011
Rob Bailey	England	24	2011	2021
Robin Bailhache	Australia	27	1975	1989
Mohamed Baksh	West Indies	1	1983	1983
Chris Balderstone	England	2	1994	1998
Paul Baldwin	England	18	2006	2009
Sameer Bandekar	United States	9	2002	2022
Subrata Banerjee	India	13	1983	1998
S. K. Bansal	India	30	1990	2000
Kevan Barbour	Zimbabwe	51	1998	2009
Lloyd Barker	West Indies	37	1984	1997
Nitin Bathi	Netherlands	5	2021	2022
Gary Baxter	New Zealand	38	2005	2014
Karran Bayney	Canada	4	2009	2010
Danzel Becker	South Africa	16	1997	2001
Mark Benson	England	72	2004	2009
Aloke Bhattacharjee	India	3	1998	2002
Dickie Bird	England	69	1973	1995
Jack Birkenshaw	England	6	1983	1988
Roland Black	Ireland	20	2016	2022
Sukha Bose	India	2	1983	1984
Billy Bowden	New Zealand	200	1995	2016
Gregory Brathwaite	West Indies	49	2011	2022
Bruce Bricknell	New Zealand	2	1981	1982
Tom Brooks	Australia	2	1971	1975
Chris Brown	New Zealand	19	2016	2022
George Browne	West Indies	1	1988	1988
Steve Bucknor	West Indies	181	1989	2009
Lloyd Budd	England	12	1974	1979
Mike Burns	England	2	2020	2022
Feroze Butt	Pakistan	4	1985	1994
Ghafoor Butt	Pakistan	1	1982	1982
Dooland Buultjens	Sri Lanka	18	1983	1992
Kevin Carmody	Australia	2	1979	1980
Iknow Chabi	Zimbabwe	4	2019	2022
Anil Chaudhary	India	22	2013	2022
Owen Chirombe	Zimbabwe	16	2010	2014
Vijay Chopra	India	6	1996	2002
S. Choudhary	India	9	1993	1999
Johan Cloete	South Africa	60	2009	2016
Jack Collins	Australia	1	1979	1979
David Constant	England	33	1972	2001
B. C. Cooray	Sri Lanka	48	1985	2001
William Copeland	Australia	1	1979	1979
Charles Coventry	Zimbabwe	5	2000	2001
Graham Cowan	New Zealand	5	1989	1991
Doug Cowie	New Zealand	71	1992	2005
Stan Cowman	New Zealand	2	1983	1983
Tony Crafter	Australia	84	1979	1992
Peter Cronin	Australia	6	1979	1981
Clyde Cumberbatch	West Indies	26	1984	1997
Aleem Dar	Pakistan	225	2000	2023
Tabarak Dar	Hong Kong	3	2016	2017
Salil Das	India	1	1985	1985
Narendra Dave	Kenya	1	2001	2001
Steve Davis	Australia	137	1992	2015
Asoka de Silva	Sri Lanka	122	1999	2012
Eric Dempster	New Zealand	3	1974	1976
Sankara Dendapani	India	1	1998	1998
Suresh Deo	India	1	1996	1996
Kumar Dharmasena	Sri Lanka	118	2009	2022
Wilf Diedricks	South Africa	31	1992	2001
Roger Dill	Bermuda	25	2006	2008
Rockie D'Mello	Kenya	1	2001	2001
Billy Doctrove	West Indies	112	1998	2012
Dara Dotiwalla	India	8	1982	1988
Alex Dowdalls	Scotland	8	2017	2019
Barry Dudleston	England	4	1992	2001
Nigel Duguid	West Indies	12	2017	2022
Clyde Duncan	West Indies	21	1988	2010
Steve Dunne	New Zealand	100	1989	2002
Gary Duperouzel	Australia	1	1980	1980
Ahmed Shah Durrani	Afghanistan	7	2017	2022
Nilay Dutta	India	1	1990	1990
Charlie Elliott	England	5	1972	1974
Ross Emerson	Australia	10	1996	1999
Marais Erasmus	South Africa	108	2007	2022
Ahmed Esat	Zimbabwe	11	1995	2002
David Evans	England	13	1979	1985
Graeme Evans	Zimbabwe	15	1997	2001
Ric Evans	Australia	17	1988	1994
Arthur Fagg	England	7	1972	1976
Herbi Felsinger	Sri Lanka	11	1982	1986
Jeff Fenwick	Zimbabwe	6	2000	2001
Nigel Fleming	Zimbabwe	1	1994	1994
K. T. Francis	Sri Lanka	56	1982	1999
Dick French	Australia	56	1979	1988
Simon Fry	Australia	49	2011	2018
Chris Gaffaney	New Zealand	74	2010	2022
Bhairab Ganguli	India	2	1982	1984
Ralph Gardiner	New Zealand	1	1976	1976
Johnny Gayle	West Indies	2	1984	1988
Antonio Gaynor	West Indies	6	1986	1986
Shaun George	South Africa	56	2011	2021
Nadeem Ghauri	Pakistan	43	2000	2010
Jiban Ghosh	India	3	1981	1984
Sunit Ghosh	India	7	1987	1989
Mohammad Ghouse	India	2	1983	1984
K. S. Giridharan	India	5	1994	1999
Francis Gomes	India	2	2000	2001
Fred Goodall	New Zealand	15	1973	1988
Quintin Goosen	Zimbabwe	11	1994	2001
Ralph Gosein	West Indies	2	1978	1978
Madhav Gothoskar	India	1	1981	1981
Michael Gough	England	65	2013	2021
Ian Gould	England	140	2006	2019
Ram Babu Gupta	India	24	1985	1990
Satish Gupta	India	5	1999	2002
Mahendra Gupte	India	1	1983	1983
V. M. Gupte	India	2	1999	1999
Allan Haggo	Scotland	12	2016	2022
Zameer Haider	Pakistan	15	2006	2012
Shaun Haig	New Zealand	7	2018	2022
Darrell Hair	Australia	139	1991	2008
Shahul Hameed	Indonesia	10	2006	2007
John Hampshire	England	20	1989	2001
Tej Handu	India	1	1994	1994
Lyndon Hannibal	Sri Lanka	11	2018	2022
S. N. Hanumantha Rao	India	2	1981	1982
Enamul Haque	Bangladesh	54	2006	2015
Krishna Hariharan	India	34	1997	2006
Les Harmer	New Zealand	1	1974	1974
Daryl Harper	Australia	174	1994	2011
Rocky Harris	Australia	1	1979	1979
Peter Hartley	England	6	2007	2009
Mick Harvey	Australia	6	1979	1980
Azhar Hasan	Pakistan	1	1977	1977
John Hastie	New Zealand	4	1975	1982
Mark Hawthorne	Ireland	33	2011	2021
Khizer Hayat	Pakistan	55	1978	1996
Sanjay Hazare	India	5	2009	2010
Ian Higginson	New Zealand	4	1983	1984
Tony Hill	New Zealand	96	1998	2013
Dalton Holder	West Indies	1	1995	1995
John Holder	England	19	1988	2001
Adrian Holdstock	South Africa	38	2013	2022
Mohammed Hosein	West Indies	2	1988	1989
Sailab Hossain	Bangladesh	3	2001	2002
Ian Howell	South Africa	66	2000	2009
Karl Hurter	South Africa	4	2002	2006
Richard Illingworth	England	77	2010	2022
Zafar Iqbal	Pakistan	1	2000	2000
Ray Isherwood	Australia	21	1979	1986
B. Jamula	India	5	1990	1999
Huub Jansen	Netherlands	3	2018	2019
Arani Jayaprakash	India	38	1993	2006
Lalith Jayasundara	Sri Lanka	9	1999	2001
Bongani Jele	South Africa	14	2016	2022
Arthur Jepson	England	5	1974	1976
Brian Jerling	South Africa	94	2000	2011
Vinay Kumar Jha	Nepal	1	2022	2022
Glenroy T. Johnson	West Indies	6	1989	2001
Mel Johnson	Australia	49	1979	1988
Allan Jones	England	1	1996	1996
Phil Jones	New Zealand	3	2014	2015
Ray Julian	England	6	1996	2001
R. R. Kadam	India	4	1986	1987
Kantilal Kanjee	Zimbabwe	10	1992	1994
Alu Kapa	Papua New Guinea	1	2017	2017
K. R. Karimanickam	India	1	1986	1986
T. R. Kashyappan	India	1	2000	2000
B. R. Keshavamurthy	India	1	1986	1986
Richard Kettleborough	England	95	2009	2022
Amanullah Khan	Pakistan	13	1980	1993
Islam Khan	Pakistan	2	1994	1995
Shakeel Khan	Pakistan	16	1982	1996
Siddiq Khan	Pakistan	5	1990	1995
Taufeeq Khan	Pakistan	1	1992	1992
Christopher King	New Zealand	25	1992	1999
Len King	Australia	23	1988	1993
David Kinsella	New Zealand	6	1982	1985
Swaroop Kishen	India	6	1981	1985
Mervyn Kitchen	England	28	1983	2001
Wayne Knights	New Zealand	18	2016	2022
Donovan Koch	Australia	1	2022	2022
Rudi Koertzen	South Africa	209	1992	2010
O. Krishna	India	1	1998	1998
Sudhakar Kulkarni	India	5	1986	1988
Vinayak Kulkarni	India	2	1999	2000
Vineet Kulkarni	India	25	2013	2016
Jose Kurushinkal	India	3	1994	1996
K. G. Lakshminarayan	India	1	2002	2002
Barry Lambson	South Africa	35	1992	2001
John Langridge	England	8	1975	1979
Barrie Leadbeater	England	5	1983	2000
Karl Liebenberg	South Africa	33	1992	1996
Jermaine Lindo	United States	8	2019	2022
Nigel Llong	England	130	2006	2020
Jeremy Lloyds	England	18	2000	2006
Andrew Louw	Namibia	1	2021	2021
Jeff Luck	Namibia	3	2006	2006
Zainool Maccum	West Indies	1	1998	1998
Clancy Mack	West Indies	1	2001	2001
Jayaraman Madanagopal	India	1	2022	2022
Syed Mahabubullah	Bangladesh	1	2002	2002
M. S. Mahal	India	1	2002	2002
Patric Makumbi	Uganda	2	2023	2023
Norman Malcolm	West Indies	27	2008	2011
Wesley Malcolm	West Indies	1	1978	1978
Iftikhar Malik	Pakistan	1	1993	1993
Vijaya Mallela	United States	7	2019	2022
Neil Mallender	England	22	2001	2003
Peter Manuel	Sri Lanka	45	1992	2004
Mick Martell	Australia	8	2014	2017
Bruce Martin	Australia	25	1981	1987
Ranmore Martinesz	Sri Lanka	46	2010	2018
Jeremiah Matibiri	Zimbabwe	23	2013	2018
Thomas McCall	New Zealand	2	1985	1985
Peter McConnell	Australia	68	1983	1992
Rodger McHarg	New Zealand	13	1986	1992
David McLean	Scotland	7	2019	2022
Tony McQuillan	Australia	14	1993	1999
Rajan Mehra	India	3	1982	1987
Narendra Menon	India	4	1993	1998
Nitin Menon	India	30	2017	2022
Barrie Meyer	England	23	1977	1993
David Millns	England	6	2020	2022
Ryan Milne	Scotland	3	2022	2022
Cyril Mitchley	South Africa	61	1992	2000
Subhash Modi	Kenya	22	2001	2010
Mohammad Aslam	Pakistan	18	1982	2002
Sadiq Mohammad	Pakistan	1	2000	2000
Sadique Mohammed	West Indies	7	1981	1986
C. R. Mohite	India	4	1998	2002
Robert Monteith	New Zealand	3	1975	1981
Basil Morgan	West Indies	15	1996	2001
George Morris	New Zealand	8	1984	1988
R. Mrithyunjayan	India	2	1983	1985
M. G. Mukherjee	India	1	1986	1986
Bala Murali	India	3	1994	1997
Forster Mutizwa	Zimbabwe	1	2022	2022
R. Nagarajan	India	1	1998	1998
Muhammed Nanabhay	South Africa	1	2002	2002
C. K. Nandan	India	7	2016	2019
A. L. Narasimhan	India	4	1983	1993
David Narine	West Indies	4	1981	1985
Rab Nawaz	Pakistan	2	1982	1984
Mohammad Nazir	Pakistan	11	1994	2000
Alan Neill	Ireland	10	2016	2021
Peter Nero	West Indies	22	2011	2014
Eddie Nicholls	West Indies	46	1995	2005
Sam Nogajski	Australia	6	2017	2020
Christian Nyazika	Zimbabwe	1	2001	2001
Max O'Connell	Australia	6	1975	1981
Alan Oakman	England	1	1972	1972
Lakani Oala	Papua New Guinea	2	2017	2017
David Odhiambo	Kenya	4	2012	2019
Dave Orchard	South Africa	107	1994	2003
Don Oslear	England	8	1980	1984
Bruce Oxenford	Australia	97	2008	2020
Isaac Oyieko	Kenya	1	2023	2023
Ahmed Shah Pakteen	Afghanistan	30	2017	2022
Allahudien Paleker	South Africa	5	2019	2022
Ruchira Palliyaguruge	Sri Lanka	84	2011	2022
Ken Palmer	England	23	1977	2001
Roy Palmer	England	8	1983	1995
Padmakar Pandit	India	9	1983	1988
Peter Parker	Australia	65	1993	2008
Stanton Parris	West Indies	1	1983	1983
Bob Parry	Australia	4	2002	2002
K. Parthasarathy	India	10	1993	2002
Nandasena Pathirana	Sri Lanka	13	1993	2001
Cleophas Paynter	West Indies	1	1977	1977
Camillus Perera	Sri Lanka	1	1985	1985
Christopher Phiri	Zimbabwe	1	2022	2022
Suren Phookan	India	1	1986	1986
Harikrishna Pillai	Oman	8	2020	2021
Nigel Plews	England	16	1986	1996
Claire Polosak	Australia	1	2019	2019
Selliah Ponnadurai	Sri Lanka	8	1983	1993
K. T. Ponnambalam	Sri Lanka	2	1985	1986
Subroto Porel	India	8	1994	2002
Buddhi Pradhan	Nepal	34	2006	2022
Sarika Prasad	Singapore	12	2012	2018
G. A. Pratapkumar	India	2	1998	2001
Terry Prue	Australia	39	1988	1999
Ram Punjabi	India	2	1982	1982
Dave Quested	New Zealand	31	1992	2002
Saqib Qureshi	Pakistan	1	1994	1994
Ikram Rabbani	Pakistan	6	1984	1995
K. N. Raghavan	India	1	1998	1998
Anisur Rahman	Bangladesh	9	2014	2018
Mahbubur Rahman	Bangladesh	17	2002	2006
Masudur Rahman	Bangladesh	12	2018	2022
Showkatur Rahman	Bangladesh	2	2001	2002
Des Raj	India	1	1998	1998
R. T. Ramachandran	India	4	1993	1998
Ian Ramage	Scotland	35	2008	2017
R. V. Ramani	India	13	1983	1993
Kasturi Ramaswami	India	2	1982	1982
V. K. Ramaswamy	India	43	1983	2002
Prageeth Rambukwella	Sri Lanka	2	2022	2022
S. R. Ramchandra Rao	India	3	1983	1987
Shakoor Rana	Pakistan	22	1977	1996
Steve Randell	Australia	88	1984	1998
Mansfield Rangi	New Zealand	1	1976	1976
Nagaraja Rao	India	2	1985	1986
Surya Prakash Rao	India	1	1996	1996
R. S. Rathore	India	4	1986	1991
Asad Rauf	Pakistan	98	2000	2013
Sundaram Ravi	India	48	2011	2019
S. Ravindhron	India	1	1986	1986
Ahsan Raza	Pakistan	40	2010	2022
Shozab Raza	Pakistan	24	2012	2019
Leslie Reifer	West Indies	17	2017	2022
Paul Reiffel	Australia	74	2009	2022
Piloo Reporter	India	22	1984	1994
Paul Reynolds	Ireland	7	2018	2022
Dusty Rhodes	England	3	1972	1973
Rashid Riaz	Pakistan	8	2019	2022
Riazuddin	Pakistan	12	1990	2000
Ian Robinson	Zimbabwe	90	1992	2004
Tim Robinson	England	18	2013	2021
Lou Rowan	Australia	1	1971	1971
Joydeb Roy	India	1	1986	1986
Langton Rusere	Zimbabwe	17	2015	2022
B. K. Sadashiva	India	2	1998	1999
Martin Saggers	England	3	2020	2022
Izatullah Safi	Afghanistan	5	2017	2022
Amiesh Saheba	India	51	2000	2011
Shiju Sam	United Arab Emirates	16	2019	2022
T. M. Samarasinghe	Sri Lanka	14	1992	1998
S. T. Sambandam	India	1	1990	1990
Douglas Sang Hue	West Indies	1	1988	1988
Chandra Sathe	India	5	1993	2000
Claus Schumacher	Namibia	1	2021	2021
H. S. Sekhon	India	2	1994	1996
Rajan Seth	India	1	1998	1998
Mahboob Shah	Pakistan	32	1976	1996
Nadir Shah	Bangladesh	40	2006	2011
Said Shah	Pakistan	5	1984	1997
Ahmed Shahab	Pakistan	4	2015	2015
Chettithody Shamshuddin	India	43	2013	2020
Sharfuddoula	Bangladesh	48	2010	2021
Devendra Sharma	India	5	1997	2002
Devinder Sharma	India	1	2001	2001
Raman Sharma	India	11	1993	1997
S. K. Sharma	India	10	1993	2002
Virender Sharma	India	4	2020	2022
George Sharp	England	31	1996	2001
Suresh Shastri	India	19	1993	2007
Bill Sheahan	Australia	5	1993	1994
David Shepherd	England	172	1983	2005
Bismillah Jan Shinwari	Afghanistan	9	2018	2022
Ivaturi Shivram	India	9	1994	2002
Shujauddin Siddiqi	Pakistan	1	1978	1978
Gamini Silva	Sri Lanka	21	1999	2009
Jasbir Singh	India	6	1994	2000
M. R. Singh	India	6	1993	2000
Richard Smith	Ireland	6	2012	2014
Gazi Sohel	Bangladesh	4	2021	2022
Tom Spencer	England	6	1972	1975
Lyndon Stevens	Australia	1	1979	1979
Ronald Strang	Zimbabwe	1	1994	1994
Durga Subedi	Nepal	5	2020	2022
M. G. Subramaniam	India	1	1983	1983
Babu Khan Tahir	Pakistan	1	1984	1984
Shavir Tarapore	India	25	1999	2012
Simon Taufel	Australia	174	1999	2012
Ian Thomas	Australia	8	1990	1994
Ian Thomson	Hong Kong	1	2016	2016
Claude Thorburn	Namibia	1	2019	2019
Russell Tiffin	Zimbabwe	154	1992	2018
Col Timmins	Australia	20	1988	1995
Rod Tucker	Australia	85	2009	2020
Adriaan van den Dries	Netherlands	3	2021	2022
Pim van Liemt	Netherlands	1	2019	2019
Srinivasaraghavan Venkataraghavan	India	52	1993	2003
P. W. Vidanagamage	Sri Lanka	23	1982	1991
Rangachari Vijayaraghavan	India	2	1990	2000
V. Vikramraju	India	5	1984	1988
Compton Vyfhuis	West Indies	2	1977	1981
Shaid Wadvalla	South Africa	3	2001	2002
Ernest Wainscott	New Zealand	3	1973	1975
Derek Walker	New Zealand	9	2014	2016
John Ward	Australia	7	2014	2016
Evan Watkin	New Zealand	23	1995	2010
Arthur Watson	Australia	3	1979	1980
Andrew Weekes	West Indies	3	1983	1989
Don Weser	Australia	8	1979	1981
Alex Wharf	England	11	2018	2022
Alan Whitehead	England	14	1979	2001
Rex Whitehead	Australia	14	1979	1983
Pat Whyte	West Indies	4	1983	1988
Udaya Wickramasinghe	Sri Lanka	13	1991	1998
E. K. G. Wijewardene	Sri Lanka	1	1999	1999
Tyron Wijewardene	Sri Lanka	52	1999	2013
Peter Willey	England	34	1996	2003
Jacqueline Williams	West Indies	5	2019	2019
Joel Wilson	West Indies	81	2011	2022
Paul Wilson	Australia	32	2014	2020
Raveendra Wimalasiri	Sri Lanka	24	2013	2022
Steve Woodward	New Zealand	30	1982	1992
Asif Yaqoob	Pakistan	3	2019	2022
Athar Zaidi	Pakistan	10	1984	1999

== In-game changes ==
The figures include the following occasion when an on-field umpire was replaced during an ODI:

- Three umpires were used for the 4th ODI between Australia and India at Canberra in 2015–16. Richard Kettleborough was injured during Australia's innings and was replaced by third umpire Paul Wilson.
