= Mohammad Asaduddin =

Indian cricketer (born 1990)

Personal information
- Born: 18 May 1990 (age 36); Hyderabad, India
- Nickname: Abbas
- Relatives: Mohammad Azharuddin (father)

Career statistics
Competition	FC
Matches	2
Runs scored	17
Batting average	5.66
100s/50s	0/0
Top score	15
Catches/stumpings	0/-
- Source: ESPNcricinfo, 6 December 2018

Mohammad Asaduddin (born 18 May 1990) is an Indian cricketer. He made his first-class debut for Goa in the 2018–19 Ranji Trophy on 6 December 2018. Asaduddin's last competitive appearance prior to his first-class debut had come in 2009.

== Early life and career ==
His father is Mohammad Azharuddin, who captained the India cricket team in the 1980s and 1990s.

His younger brother Ayazuddin died in a bike accident in 2011. He made his first-class cricket debut in 2018.

== Personal life ==
In 2019, he married Anam Mirza, the younger sister of tennis star Sania Mirza.
