= 1987–88 Sharjah Cup =

International cricket tournament

1988 Sharjah Cup
- Cricket format: One Day International
- Host: United Arab Emirates
- Champions: India (1st title)
- Runners-up: New Zealand
- Participants: 3
- Matches: 5
- Player of the series: (India) ND Hirwani
- Most runs: (New Zealand) RH Vance (186)
- Most wickets: (India) ND Hirwani (10)

The 1988 Sharjah Cup was held in Sharjah, UAE, between March 25 and April 1, 1988. Three national teams took part: India, New Zealand and Sri Lanka.

The 1988 Sharjah Cup started with a round-robin tournament where each team played the other once. The leading team qualified for the final in a knock-out tournament while the second and third-placed team contested a semi-final for the right to contest the final.

India won the tournament and US$30,000 in prize money. A total of US$150,000 was disbursed in prize money, awards and benefits.

== Matches ==
=== Group stage ===
Team	P	W	L	T	NR	RR	Points
India	2	2	0	0	0	4.86	8
New Zealand	2	1	1	0	0	4.52	4
Sri Lanka	2	0	2	0	0	3.60	0

Key	
	Qualified for final
	Qualified for semi-final

25 March 1988
Scorecard
Wisden report

India; 219/8 (50 overs)	v	Sri Lanka; 201 (49.2 overs)
Kapil Dev 48 (43); PA de Silva 2/28 (9 overs)		PA de Silva 88 (100); RJ Shastri 2/40 (8 overs); ND Hirwani 2/40 (10 overs)

India won by 18 runs
Sharjah Cricket Stadium, Sharjah, UAE
Umpires: Khizer Hayat (PAK) and Mahboob Shah (PAK)
Player of the match: PA de Silva (SL)

- Sri Lanka won the toss and elected to field.

27 March 1988
Scorecard
Wisden report

India; 267/6 (50 overs)	v	New Zealand; 194/8 (50 overs)
M Amarnath 102* (139); RJ Hadlee 3/54 (10 overs)		MJ Greatbatch 45 (67); ND Hirwani 4/43 (10 overs)

India won by 73 runs
Sharjah Cricket Stadium, Sharjah, UAE
Umpires: Khizer Hayat (PAK) and Mahboob Shah (PAK)
Player of the match: M Amarnath (IND)

- New Zealand won the toss and elected to field.

29 March 1988
Scorecard
Wisden report

New Zealand; 258/8 (50 overs)	v	Sri Lanka; 159 (42.5 overs)
AH Jones 85 (98); JR Ratnayeke 2/33 (10 overs)		DSBP Kuruppu 46 (70); DN Patel 3/22 (6.5 overs)

New Zealand won by 99 runs
Sharjah Cricket Stadium, Sharjah, UAE
Umpires: Khizer Hayat (PAK) and Mahboob Shah (PAK)
Player of the match: AH Jones (NZ)

- Sri Lanka won the toss and elected to field.

=== Semi-final ===
31 March 1988
Scorecard
Wisden report

New Zealand; 249/7 (50 overs)	v	Sri Lanka; 206/9 (50 overs)
RH Vance 96 (125); EAR de Silva 3/38 (8 overs)		AP Gurusinha 60 (92); W Watson 3/37 (9 overs)

New Zealand won by 43 runs
Sharjah Cricket Stadium, Sharjah, UAE
Umpires: Khizer Hayat (PAK) and Mahboob Shah (PAK)
Player of the match: RH Vance (NZ)

- New Zealand won the toss and elected to bat.

=== Final ===
1 April 1988
Scorecard
Wisden report

India; 250/7 (50 overs)	v	New Zealand; 198 (45.3 overs)
RJ Shastri 72 (66); EJ Chatfield 2/57 (10 overs)		JG Wright 55 (65); ND Hirwani 4/46 (10 overs)

India won by 52 runs
Sharjah Cricket Stadium, Sharjah, UAE
Umpires: Khizer Hayat (PAK) and Mahboob Shah (PAK)
Player of the match: RJ Shastri (IND)

- India won the toss and elected to bat.

== See also ==
- Sharjah Cup
