= South African cricket match fixing scandal =

2000 sport controversy

In 2000, several players of the South Africa national cricket team, including captain Hansie Cronje, were found guilty of match fixing during their tour of India.

== Timeline ==
On 7 April 2000, Delhi police Crime Branch officer Ishwar Singh Redhu revealed they had a recording of a conversation between Cronje and Sanjay Chawla, a representative of an Indian betting syndicate, over match-fixing allegations. Three other players, Herschelle Gibbs, Nicky Boje, and Pieter Strydom, were also implicated.

On 8 April 2000, the United Cricket Board of South Africa denied their players were involved in match-fixing. Cronje said "the allegations are completely without substance". However, on 11 April Cronje was sacked as captain after confessing to Ali Bacher that he had not been "entirely honest". He admitted accepting between $10,000 to $15,000 from a London-based bookmaker for 'forecasting' results, not match fixing, during the recent one day series in India.

In May 2000, the South African president Thabo Mbeki appointed a Commission of Inquiry into Cricket Match Fixing and Related Matters, with judge Edwin King as chairperson. On 7 June, the King Commission began. The following day, Gibbs revealed that Cronje had offered him $15,000 to score less than 20 runs in the 5th ODI at Nagpur. He also admitted another offer of $15,000 to Henry Williams to concede more than 50 runs in that same match. Gibbs scored 74 off 53 balls and Williams injured his shoulder and couldn't complete his second over, so neither received the $15,000. Off-spinner Derek Crookes, who was also a witness, admitted being surprised to open the bowling at Nagpur.

On 15 June, Cronje released a statement that revealed all his contact with bookmakers. In 1996 during the third Test in Kanpur, he was introduced to Mukesh Gupta by Mohammad Azharuddin. Gupta gave Cronje $30,000 to persuade the South Africans to lose wickets on the last day to lose the match. South Africa were 127/5 chasing 460, Cronje was already out and spoke to no other players. "I had received money for doing nothing." During the return tour, Cronje received $50,000 from Gupta for team information.

In the 2000 Centurion Test, Marlon Aronstam contacted him offering R500,000 (approximately £50,000 at the time) for the charity of his choice together with a gift if Cronje declared and made a game of it. He also admitted asking Pieter Strydom to place a R50 bet on South Africa to win for him. After the match Aronstam visited Cronje, giving him two amounts of money (R30,000 and R20,000) together with a leather jacket. The promised R500,000 did not materialise. Before the one-day series, Cronje received repeated calls from "Sanjay" asking him to fix a match. Cronje gave him the names of Gibbs, Strydom and Boje to try to get rid of him. Cronje was offered $140,000 for the fifth ODI if Gibbs scored under 20, Williams went for more than 50 and South Africa scored around 270.

On 28 August, Gibbs and Williams were suspended from international cricket for six months. Gibbs was fined R60,000 and Williams R10,000. Strydom received no punishment.

On 11 October, Cronje was banned from playing or coaching cricket for life. He challenged his life ban in September 2001 but on 17 October 2001, his application was dismissed.

Cronje was killed in a private plane accident in 2002.

Subsequent reporting on Cronje's involvement in match-fixing revealed that Cronje had more than 70 bank accounts in the Cayman Islands which were, because they were not declared to the South African Revenue Service, illegal. The South African investigation was terminated at his death: but the implication of the multiple accounts was that the match-fixing was much more widespread than had been revealed to the King Commission.

After 13 years on 22 July 2013 the Delhi Police registered an FIR for match-fixing in 2000, the chargesheet named six people with Cronje the only cricketer included along with five gamblers and bookmakers.

== See also ==
- List of cricketers banned for corruption
