= John Wright's Indian Summers =

Book authored by John Wright

- Author: John Wright
- Genre: Sports
- Publication date: 2007
- ISBN: 0285637959

John Wright's Indian Summers (2007, ISBN 0285637959) is a book authored by John Wright describing his experiences as coach of Indian national cricket team. It is co-authored by Indian journalist Sharda Ugra and New Zealand writer Paul Thomas.
