= Suren Phookan =

Indian cricket umpire

Personal information
- Full name: Suren Phookan

Umpiring information
- ODIs umpired: 1 (1986)
- Source: Cricinfo, 26 May 2014

Suren Ram Phookan is a former Indian cricket umpire. He stood in a single One Day International in 1986.

== See also ==
- List of One Day International cricket umpires
