= Babu Khan Tahir =

Pakistani cricketer and umpire

Personal information
- Full name: Babu Khan Tahir

Umpiring information
- ODIs umpired: 1 (1984)
- Source: Cricinfo, 21 May 2014

Babu Khan Tahir is a former Pakistani cricketer and umpire. He stood in one ODI game in 1984.

== See also ==
- List of One Day International cricket umpires
