= Lyndon Stevens =

Australian cricket umpire (1940–2020)

Personal information
- Born: 25 October 1940; Tasmania, Australia
- Died: 1 September 2020 (aged 79)

Umpiring information
- ODIs umpired: 1 (1979)
- Source: Cricinfo, 30 May 2014

Lyndon James Stevens (25 October 1940 – 1 September 2020) was an Australian cricket umpire. He stood in one ODI game in 1979. He was the first Tasmanian to umpire in a full international cricket match.

== See also ==
- List of One Day International cricket umpires
