= Kevin Carmody =

Australian cricket umpire (1925–2009)

Personal information
- Full name: Kevin Joseph Carmody
- Born: 5 May 1925; Elsternwick, Victoria, Australia
- Died: 9 September 2009 (aged 84); Springvale South, Victoria, Australia

Umpiring information
- ODIs umpired: 2 (1979–1980)
- Source: Cricinfo, 17 May 2014

Kevin Joseph Carmody (5 May 1925 – 9 September 2009) was an Australian cricket umpire. He officiated in two ODI games in 1979 and 1980.

== See also ==
- List of One Day International cricket umpires
