= Andrew Weekes =

West Indian cricket umpire (1940–2013)

Personal information
- Full name: Andrew Emmanuel Weekes
- Born: 26 June 1940; Sandy Point, Saint Kitts
- Died: 21 January 2013 (aged 72); Saint Kitts

Umpiring information
- Tests umpired: 4 (1983–1990)
- ODIs umpired: 3 (1983–1989)
- Source: Cricinfo, 17 July 2013

Andrew Weekes (26 June 1940 – 21 January 2013) was a West Indian cricket umpire. He stood in four Test matches between 1983 and 1990 and three ODI games between 1983 and 1989. He was the first international cricket umpire from Saint Kitts.

== See also ==
- List of Test cricket umpires
- List of One Day International cricket umpires
