= M. G. Subramaniam =

Indian cricket umpire (1931–1993)

Personal information
- Born: 5 November 1931
- Died: 19 July 1993 (aged 61)

Umpiring information
- Tests umpired: 2 (1983)
- ODIs umpired: 1 (1983)
- Source: ESPNcricinfo, 9 June 2019

M. G. Subramaniam (5 November 1931 – 19 July 1993) was an Indian cricket umpire. He stood in two Test matches and one ODI game in 1983.

== See also ==
- List of Test cricket umpires
- List of One Day International cricket umpires
