= Salil Das =

Indian cricket umpire

Personal information
- Full name: Salil Das

Umpiring information
- ODIs umpired: 1 (1985)
- Source: Cricinfo, 17 May 2014

Salil Kumar Das is a former Indian cricket umpire. He umpired mainly at the first-class level. His only international match as an umpire was a One Day International, in 1985.

== See also ==
- List of One Day International cricket umpires
