= R. Mrithyunjayan =

Indian cricket umpire

Personal information
- Full name: R. Mrithyunjayan

Umpiring information
- ODIs umpired: 2 (1983–1985)
- Source: Cricinfo, 26 May 2014

R. Mrithyunjayan is an Indian former cricket umpire. He stood in two ODI games between 1983 and 1985.

== See also ==
- List of One Day International cricket umpires
