= Graham Cowan =

New Zealand cricket umpire

Personal information
- Full name: Graham Ian James Cowan
- Born: 4 October 1940; Wellington, New Zealand
- Died: 20 July 2011 (aged 70); Whangārei, New Zealand

Umpiring information
- ODIs umpired: 5 (1989–1991)
- Source: Cricinfo, 17 May 2014

Graham Ian James Cowan (4 October 1940 – 20 July 2011) was a New Zealand cricket umpire. He officiated in five ODI games between 1989 and 1991.

Cowan began umpiring when he was transferred by the bank he worked for to the West Coast of the South Island in 1967. He umpired in 46 first-class matches between 1972 and 1993. He also umpired 35 List A matches between 1972 and 1993. Most of his matches involved Northern Districts, and all 81 matches were held in the North Island.

Cowan also served as an administrator with both the West Coast Cricket Association and Auckland Cricket, chairman of the New Zealand Cricket Umpires and Scorers Association, and chairman of Northland Cricket.

== See also ==
- List of One Day International cricket umpires
