= Arthur Watson (umpire) =

Australian cricket umpire (born 1940)

Personal information
- Born: 11 October 1940 (age 86); New South Wales, Australia

Umpiring information
- ODIs umpired: 3 (1979–1980)
- WODIs umpired: 1 (1993)
- Source: Cricinfo, 31 May 2014

Arthur George Watson (born 11 October 1940) is a former Australian cricket umpire. He stood in three ODI games between 1979 and 1980.

== See also ==
- List of One Day International cricket umpires
