= Glenroy T. Johnson =

West Indian cricket umpire

Personal information
- Full name: Glenroy T. Johnson

Umpiring information
- ODIs umpired: 6 (1989–2001)
- Source: Cricinfo, 20 May 2014

Glenroy T. Johnson is a West Indian former cricket umpire. At the international level, he only officiated in six ODI games, from 1989 to 2001.

== See also ==
- List of One Day International cricket umpires
