= Mohammed Hosein =

West Indian cricket umpire

Personal information
- Born: 4 March 1938 (age 88); Trinidad

Umpiring information
- ODIs umpired: 2 (1988–1989)
- Source: Cricinfo, 19 May 2014

Mohammed Hosein (born 4 March 1938) is a West Indian former cricket umpire. At the international level, he has only officiated in two ODI games, in 1988 and 1989.

== See also ==
- List of One Day International cricket umpires
