= Padmakar Pandit =

Indian cricket umpire (1934–2006)

Personal information
- Born: 16 December 1934; Amravati, India
- Died: 1 July 2006 (aged 71)

Umpiring information
- ODIs umpired: 9 (1983–1988)
- Source: ESPNcricinfo, 26 May 2014

Padmakar Gopal Pandit (16 December 1934 – 1 July 2006) was an Indian cricket umpire. He stood in nine ODI games from 1983 to 1988.

== See also ==
- List of One Day International cricket umpires
