= Mohammad Azharuddin =

Indian cricketer

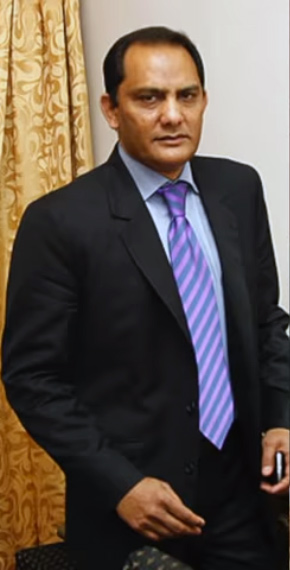
- Azharuddin in 2015

Minister for Public Enterprises and Minorities Welfare, Government of Telangana
- Incumbent
- Assumed office 31 October 2025
- Governor: Jishnu Dev Varma; Shiv Pratap Shukla
- Chief Minister: Revanth Reddy

Member of Parliament, Lok Sabha
- In office 16 May 2009 – 16 May 2014
- Preceded by: Shafiqur Rahman Barq
- Succeeded by: Kunwar Sarvesh Kumar Singh
- Constituency: Moradabad

27th President of Hyderabad Cricket Association
- In office 27 September 2019 – 2022
- Preceded by: Gaddam Vivek Venkatswamy

Working President of Telangana Pradesh Congress Committee
- Incumbent
- Assumed office 2 June 2014

Personal details
- Born: 8 February 1963 (age 63) Hyderabad, Telangana, India
- Party: Indian National Congress
- Height: 179 cm (5 ft 10 in)
- Spouses: Naureen (m. 1987; div. 1996); Sangeeta Bijlani (m. 1996; div. 2010); Shannon Marie (m. 2017)
- Children: Mohammad Asaduddin
- Education: Nizam College; Osmania University
- Nickname(s): Azhar, Azzu
- Cricket career

Cricket information
- Batting: Right-handed
- Bowling: Right-arm medium
- Role: Batsman

International information
- National side: India (1984–2000)
- Test debut (cap 169): 31 December 1984 v England
- Last Test: 2 March 2000 v South Africa
- ODI debut (cap 51): 20 January 1985 v England
- Last ODI: 3 June 2000 v Pakistan

Domestic team information
- Years: Team
- 1981–2000: Hyderabad
- 1983–2001: South Zone
- 1991–1994: Derbyshire

Career statistics
Competition	Test	ODI	FC	LA
Matches	99	334	229	433
Runs scored	6,215	9,378	15,855	12,941
Batting average	45.03	36.92	51.98	39.33
100s/50s	22/21	7/58	54/74	11/85
Top score	199	153*	226	161*
Balls bowled	13	552	1,432	827
Wickets	0	12	17	15
Bowling average	–	98.44	46.23	47.26
5 wickets in innings	–	0	0	0
10 wickets in match	–	0	0	0
Best bowling	–	3/19	3/36	3/19
Catches/stumpings	105/0	156/0	220/0	200/0
Medal record
Men's Cricket
Representing India
ACC Asia Cup
Winner	1988 Bangladesh
Winner	1990–91 India
Winner	1995 United Arab Emirates
Runner-up	1997 Sri Lanka
- Source: ESPNcricinfo, 13 February 2009

Mohammad Azharuddin (born 8 February 1963) is an Indian politician and former cricketer. He is currently serving as the Minister for Minority Welfare and Public Enterprises in Government of Telengana. A right-handed middle-order batter and occasional medium-fast bowler, he served as the Indian national cricket team's captain with 99 Test matches and 334 One Day Internationals to his name.

Azharuddin led India to wins in the 1990–91 and 1995 Asia Cups and reached the semi-finals of the 1996 Cricket World Cup. He was considered as one of the best ODI batsmen in the world and one of the greatest of his era. He captained India in three Cricket World Cups, the most by any Indian captain, all during the 1990s. He was also a part of the Indian squad which won the 1985 World Championship of Cricket. His cricketing career came to an abrupt end in 2000 after he was banned by the Board of Control for Cricket in India for life due to his involvement in a match fixing scandal. In 2012, the Andhra Pradesh High Court lifted the life ban after appeal. After that, the original ban led to distrust among the masses about the country's judicial system. In September 2019, he was elected as the president of Hyderabad Cricket Association.

In 2009, Azharuddin joined Indian National Congress and was elected as a member of parliament for Moradabad. He was appointed as the Working President of Telangana Pradesh Congress Committee in 2018.

Azharuddin took oath as a Minister in Telangana Cabinet on 31 October 2025, allocated Minorities Welfare and Public Enterprises portfolios on 4 November and assumed charge on 10 November in Telangana Secretariat.

== Early life ==
Azharuddin was born on 8 February 1963 in Hyderabad to Mohammad Azizuddin and Yousuf Sultana. He attended All Saints High School and graduated from Nizam College, Osmania University, with a Bachelor of Commerce degree.

Azharuddin recalled that his maternal uncle Mir Zainulabiddin "who captained the Osmania University inspired [him] to take to cricket". Additionally, one Brother K. M. Joseph of the All Saints High School played a role in inculcating the passion for cricket in him. This was around 1973. Starting the 1977 season, Azharuddin was part of his high school team playing in the Hyderabad cricket league. He would subsequently play for the Deccan Blues team before going on to represent Osmania University in inter-university tournaments.

Azharuddin began as a seam bowler before progressing quickly to bat at number three, besides being the third seamer, for Hyderabad Schools in the South Zone Schools against the visiting English Schools team. He made his first-class debut aged 18 in the Ranji Trophy in its 1981–82 season playing for Hyderabad. In the 1982–83 and 1983–84 domestic seasons, Azharuddin scored 2,648 and 2,499 runs respectively. His performances received recognition when he scored a double-century in the Duleep Trophy in January 1984, playing for South Zone. In December that year, he scored centuries in both innings of the Ranji Trophy match against Andhra. In the same month, he earned a Test callup, against the visiting English team as a replacement to Sandeep Patil, in the Third Test of the series to be played at the Eden Gardens in Calcutta.

== Career ==
=== Debut and early years ===
Azharuddin made his international debut for India on 31 December 1984 against England. He scored 110 in his first innings. He subsequently scored two more centuries in his next two Test matches in the series, and became the first player to score three centuries in his first three Tests. Following the Test series, Azharuddin made his One Day International (ODI) debut against the same opposition at M. Chinnaswamy Stadium in Bangalore on 20 January 1985. He made an unbeaten 47. A month later, his unbeaten 93 took his team to victory against Pakistan at the World Championship of Cricket in a group stage fixture.

After a lean patch of form in the Test format, Azharuddin scored his fourth Test century in 1986 against the visiting Sri Lankans in Kanpur. He made 199, which included a 272-run stand with Kapil Dev for the sixth in the first innings. The match resulted in a draw.

=== Captaincy of national team ===
In 1989, Azharuddin was appointed as the captain of the Indian team succeeding Krishnamachari Srikkanth. He led the Indian team in 47 Test matches and 174 One Day Internationals. He led the team to victory in 14 tests and 90 ODIs, both records until surpassed by Sourav Ganguly and MS Dhoni respectively.

During India's tour of England in 1990, Azharuddin scored 121 in the first Test at Lord's. Though India lost the match, former England cricketer Vic Marks called it "the most dazzling Test century" he had ever witnessed, in his column for The Observer. In the second Test in Manchester, Azharuddin scored his tenth Test century, making 179 runs while putting on a 112-run stand with Sachin Tendulkar in the first innings. Playing his 39th Test, he reached his century off 155 balls. Azharuddin ended the series with 426 runs at an average of 85.20 which was the highest tally by an India captain in a Test series in England until it was broken by Virat Kohli in 2018.

=== Asia Cup victories and World Cups ===
Azharuddin led India to victory in the 1990–91 Asia Cup beating Sri Lanka in the final. He scored 54 runs in the final and was named Man of the Match. He then led India at the 1992 World Cup where his team were knocked out in the group stage and finished seventh out of nine teams with two wins in eight matches. India won the 1995 Asia Cup beating Sri Lanka by 8 wickets in the final where Azharuddin captained the team and won the man of the match scoring runs. Azharuddin again led the team in the 1996 World Cup co-hosted by India. India finished in third place in the group stage, qualifying for the quarter finals where they beat Pakistan by 39 runs to make it to the semi finals. India lost in the semifinals to Sri Lanka after the match was abandoned midway due to crowd trouble when India were eight wickets down for 120 runs in response to Sri Lanka's score of 251/8.

=== Later years ===
During the second test of South Africa's India tour in 1996–97 at Kolkata, Azharuddin scored a century off 74 deliveries equaling Kapil Dev's record for the fastest test century by an India player and fourth overall, in terms of balls faced. Azharuddin scored another century in the next test making an unbeaten 163 and helped India record their biggest win in Test history in terms of runs (280) at the time. He was named the man of the match and the series after aggregating 388 runs at an average of 77.60 Azharuddin scored seven centuries in ODIs with a best of 153 coming against Zimbabwe on 9 April 1998 in Cuttack. He scored the last of his 22 centuries in tests against South Africa in Bangalore in March 2000, which also turned out to be the last test match in his career. Azharuddin played the final match of his international career in an ODI against Pakistan on 3 June 2000 in the 2000 Asia Cup.

=== Match fixing allegations and ban ===
During South Africa's tour of India in 2000, a series that was won by India 3–2, Azharuddin scored only 112 runs at an average of 28. he was accused of match fixing in the match fixing scandal that erupted in the aftermath of the series. Then captain of South Africa Hansie Cronje stated that Azharuddin was the one to introduce him to bookies. International Cricket Council and BCCI banned Azharuddin for life based on a report by Central Bureau of Investigation.

=== Post-retirement ===
In 2003, a trial court upheld the lifetime ban but it was later overturned on 8 November 2012 by a divisional bench of the Andhra Pradesh High Court. In 2019, Azhar was elected as the president of Hyderabad Cricket Association.

== Personal life ==
Azharuddin married Naureen in 1987 and they had two sons, Mohammad Asaduddin and Mohammad Ayazuddin. In 1996, he divorced Naureen and married actress Sangeeta Bijlani. After Azharuddin's rumored affairs with multiple people, notably badminton player Jwala Gutta, Sangeeta filed for a divorce in 2010. His younger son Ayazuddin died in a bike accident in 2011. His elder son Asaduddin is a domestic cricketer and he married Anam Mirza, the sister of Sania Mirza in 2019.

== Playing style ==
Azharuddin was a right handed middle order batsman and an occasional medium fast bowler. He was known for his graceful and fluid batting style. John Woodcock, a cricket writer, said of him, "It's no use asking an Englishman to bat like Mohammad Azharuddin. It would be like expecting a greyhound to win The Derby." Former cricketer and umpire Srinivasaraghavan Venkataraghavan stated that "Azharuddin had the best wrists in the game". Mike Atherton and Angus Fraser said Azharuddin's "genius was second only to Brian Lara among batsmen of their generation."

== Statistics ==
Predominantly a middle order batsman, Azharuddin played 99 test matches for India and scored 6,215 runs at an average of 45.03, including 22 centuries and 21 half-centuries. He scored 9,378 runs in One Day Internationals (ODIs) from 334 matches at an average of 36.92 and 156 catches as a fielder. Azharuddin made his debut with a 110 against England in Kolkata in 1984 and scored 102 against South Africa in Bangalore in his last match, becoming the first Indian and the fifth batsman ever to score a century in his first and last Test matches.

Team	Runs	Average	100s	Highest score
Australia	780	39.00	2	163*
England	1978	58.09	6	182
New Zealand	1152	61.23	2	192
Pakistan	1089	40.47	3	141
South Africa	915	41.00	4	163*
Sri Lanka	1215	55.23	5	199
West Indies	539	28.37	0	97
Zimbabwe	59	14.75	0	42
Total	6215	45.04	22	199

== Political career ==
Azharuddin joined Indian National Congress party on 19 February 2009. He won the 2009 general election from Moradabad in Uttar Pradesh to become a member of parliament. He contested the 2014 election from Tonk–Sawai Madhopur in Rajasthan but lost to Sukhbir Singh Jaunapuria of the Bharatiya Janata Party. In 2018, he was appointed working president of Telangana Pradesh Congress Committee. He contested the 2023 Telangana Legislative Assembly election from Jubilee Hills in Hyderabad but lost to Maganti Gopinath of the Bharat Rashtra Samithi.. In 2025 he was officially sworn in as Minister for Minority welfare in Telangana Council of Ministers and to constitutionally keep this position he was Nominated by governer with recommendation from the Government of telangana to the Telangana Legislative Council in April of 2026 after his long pending application which was approved by Governer Shiv Pratap Shukla

== Awards ==
Azharuddin was awarded the Arjuna Award in 1986 and India's fourth-highest civilian award Padma Shri in 1988. He was named one of five Wisden's cricketers of the year for 1991. Azharuddin has also received doctorate degree (honoris causa) from Jamia Hamdard, New Delhi on 21 September 2023.

== In popular culture ==
The Bollywood film Azhar, directed by Tony D'Souza, was based on his life. The film featured Emraan Hashmi as Azharuddin and was released on 13 May 2016. The Netflix film Caught Out: Crime. Corruption. Cricket. depicting the investigations and allegations of match fixing against former cricketers including Mohammad Azharuddin premiered on 17 March 2023.

Preceded by Krishnamachari Srikkanth	Indian National Test Cricket Captain; 1989/90 – 1996	Succeeded by Sachin Tendulkar
Preceded by Sachin Tendulkar	Indian National Test Cricket Captain; 1997/98 – 1998/99	Succeeded by Sachin Tendulkar
