= John Wright (cricketer, born 1954) =

New Zealand cricketer

John Wright MBE
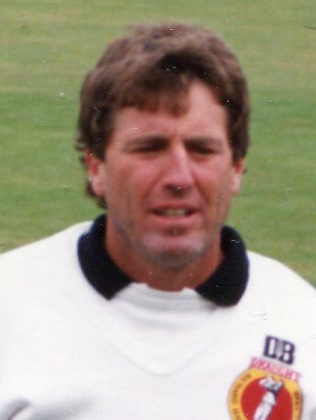
- Wright in 1990

Personal information
- Full name: John Geoffrey Wright
- Born: 5 July 1954 (age 72); Darfield, New Zealand
- Batting: Left-handed
- Bowling: Right-arm medium
- Role: Opening batsman
- Relatives: Geoff Wright (father); Allan Wright (uncle)

International information
- National side: New Zealand (1978–1993)
- Test debut (cap 141): 10 February 1978 v England
- Last Test: 16 March 1993 v Australia
- ODI debut (cap 28): 15 July 1978 v England
- Last ODI: 12 December 1992 v Sri Lanka

Domestic team information
- Years: Team
- 1975/76–1983/84: Northern Districts
- 1977–1988: Derbyshire
- 1984/85–1988/89: Canterbury
- 1989/90–1992/93: Auckland

Head coaching information
- Years: Team
- 2000-2005: India
- 2010-2012: New Zealand

Career statistics
Competition	Test	ODI	FC	LA
Matches	82	149	366	349
Runs scored	5,334	3,891	25,073	10,240
Batting average	37.82	26.46	42.35	30.84
100s/50s	12/23	1/24	59/126	6/68
Top score	185	101	192	108
Balls bowled	30	24	370	42
Wickets	0	0	2	1
Bowling average	–	–	169.50	18.00
5 wickets in innings	–	–	0	0
10 wickets in match	–	–	0	0
Best bowling	–	–	1/4	1/8
Catches/stumpings	38/–	51/–	192/–	108/–
Medal record
Men's Cricket
Representing India as Coach
ICC Cricket World Cup
Runner-up	2003 South Africa-Zimbabwe-Kenya
ICC Champions Trophy
Winner	2002 Sri Lanka
- Source: ESPNcricinfo, 4 November 2016

John Geoffrey Wright MBE (born 5 July 1954) is a former international cricketer who represented – and captained – New Zealand. He made his international debut in 1978 against England.

He scored more than 5,000 Test runs (the first New Zealand Test player to do so) at an average of 37.82 runs per dismissal with 12 Test centuries, 10 of them in New Zealand. He also played for Derbyshire in England from 1977 to 1988. In first-class cricket he scored more than 25,000 runs, including more than 50 first-class centuries. He scored over 10,000 runs in List A limited-overs cricket.

Following his retirement in 1993, he coached the Indian national cricket team from 2000 to 2005 and New Zealand from 2010 to 2012. With India, he helped the national team to be one of the dual-winners of the 2002 ICC Champions Trophy, along with Sri Lanka, and led the team to the finals of the 2003 Cricket World Cup.

== Domestic career ==
John Wright played cricket for his school, Christ's College, Christchurch, scoring several centuries. When he was studying at Otago University, he would travel from Dunedin to Christchurch on the weekends to play club cricket in order to make the Canterbury team. Unable to make the Canterbury team, he moved to Gisborne and played five first-class games for Northern Districts in the 1975/76 season. At the end of the season, he travelled to England where he spent time playing club cricket and time training with the Kent team. Later in the 1976 season, he got the opportunity to play for the Kent second XI, scoring 500 runs at an average of 52. Wright also played for Derrick Robins' XI against Kent, scoring a century.

Wright wrote to Derbyshire asking them for a trial on the basis that they were the only English county side without an overseas player. He was invited to play a couple of trial games. He played in a second XI game for Derbyshire against Nottinghamshire. Opening the batting he proceeded to score 159 not out and then had success in the other trial games. As a result, Wright was offered a one-year contract to play for Derbyshire in 1977. After five first-class games for Derbyshire in 1977, he received his county cap and a pay rise.

== International career ==
Wright typically opened the batting for New Zealand, and was noted as a tenacious, rather than spectacular, batsman. His team nickname was "shake"; reputedly a reflection of his packing technique. Together with Bruce Edgar of Wellington, he formed what was arguably New Zealand's most successful and reliable opening partnership. During a match against Australia in 1980, he became the second player in history to score an eight off one ball in a Test, running four and collecting four overthrows. Toward the end of his career he used an unorthodox batting stance. In contrast, most batsman face the bowler with the bat in line with their legs and perpendicular to the ground, Wright would stand with his bat raised parallel to the ground.

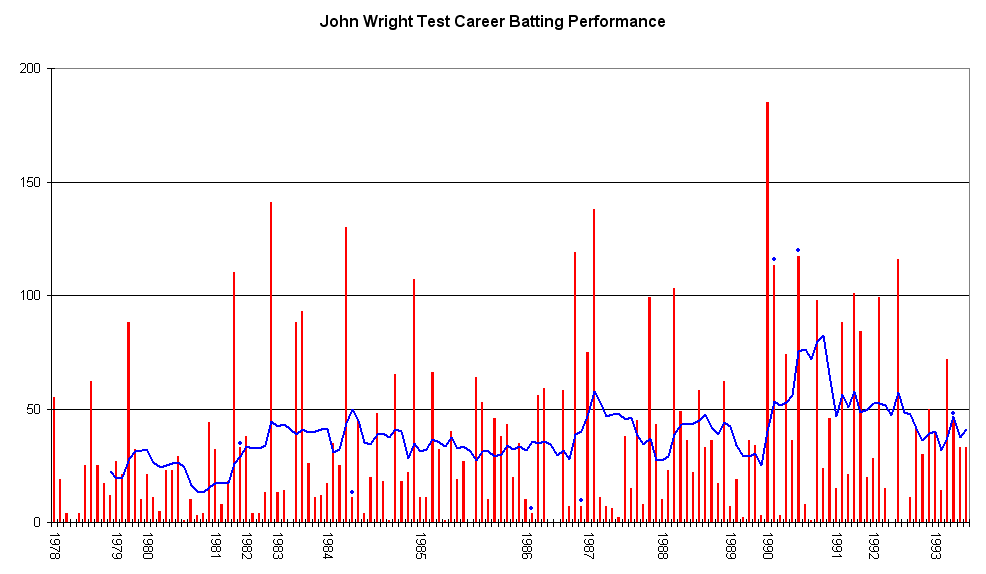
An innings-by-innings breakdown of Wright's Test match batting career, showing runs scored (red bars) and the average of the last ten innings (blue line).

Wright was disappointed with the results of his first 20-odd Test matches and after a discussion with Bob Willis, he started working with a sports psychologist. He eventually learnt transcendental meditation. He commented: "Some people call it mental toughness, it wasn't mental toughness, it was just being mentally organised, being able to get out there and express yourself in a way you knew you were capable of but you made it hard for yourself because of the pressure you put on yourself".

Wright's Test teammate Ian Smith said of Wright's captaincy of the team: "He had an uncanny knack of bringing out the best in players, some of whom, I'm sure, thought they had already had their best days. I probably played my best cricket under John Wright's leadership; Martin Snedden and John Bracewell would be in the same category".

In the 1988 Queen's Birthday Honours, Wright was appointed a Member of the Order of the British Empire, for services to cricket.

== Coaching career ==
After retiring, Wright worked in sales for around two years – self-confessedly without great success. After taking up coaching for Kent County Cricket Club, Wright enjoyed a successful coaching career with India from 2000 to 2005, during which time the team improved immensely, winning a home Test series 2–1 against Australia (which included the historic Kolkata Test which India won coming back from a follow-on with Indian batsman VVS Laxman making 281 not out), drawing a four-match Test series against Australia 1–1 in Australia in 2003–04 (Steve Waugh's farewell Test series), winning a series against arch-rivals Pakistan, and reaching the final of the 2003 Cricket World Cup held in South Africa, Zimbabwe and Kenya. The following months saw the team lose form, and series to Australia and Pakistan. In May 2005, former Australian skipper Greg Chappell took over from Wright. Wright was also appointed as coach of the World XI team that played Australia in the ICC Super Series 2005.

On 20 December 2010, Wright was named as New Zealand's coach, replacing Mark Greatbatch. He resigned that role in 2012, following New Zealand's tour of the West Indies. New Zealand Cricket was keen for him to continue as coach but Wright did not wish to do so. He did not see eye to eye with John Buchanan, who was the Director of Cricket for New Zealand Cricket. "We see things a little differently," Wright said. "It would be fair to say we're probably more comfortable coaching against each other, which we did for four and a half years."

In January 2013 Wright was appointed head coach of the Mumbai Indians in the Indian Premier League. The Mumbai Indians won that edition of the IPL. Wright has worked with the Mumbai Indians for seven years.

== Music career ==
Wright always took his guitar when on tour as a cricketer. He released his debut album Red Skies in 2017. The songs are about travelling as an international cricketer and coach. He is planning to release an EP of new songs titled Jump the Sun.

== Publications ==
In 1990, together with New Zealand writer Paul Thomas, Wright wrote an autobiography, Christmas in Rarotonga. In 2006, along with Indian journalist Sharda Ugra and Paul Thomas, Wright co-authored the book John Wright's Indian Summers describing his experiences as coach of the Indian team.

Sporting positions
Preceded by Jeff Crowe	New Zealand national cricket captain 1987/88–1990	Succeeded by Martin Crowe
Preceded by Anshuman Gaekwad	India national cricket coach 2000–2005	Succeeded by Greg Chappell
