= 2008 Chennai Super Kings season =

Indian Premier League cricket team season

Chennai Super Kings
2008 season
- Coach: Kepler Wessels
- Captain: Mahendra Singh Dhoni
- IPL: Runner Up
- CLT20: Cancelled
- Most runs: Suresh Raina (421)
- Most wickets: Albie Morkel (17)
- Most catches: Suresh Raina (10)
- Most wicket-keeping dismissals: MS Dhoni (6)

Chennai Super Kings (CSK) is a franchise cricket team based in Chennai, India, which plays in the Indian Premier League (IPL). They were one of the eight teams that took part in the 2008 Indian Premier League which was the inaugural season of the IPL. They were captained by Mahendra Singh Dhoni and coached by Kepler Wessels. They finished runners-up in the IPL after losing the finals to the Rajasthan Royals by 3 wickets. They qualified for the 2008 Champions League Twenty20 but the tournament was cancelled due to 2008 Mumbai attacks.

== Pre-season player signings ==
During the first player auctions for the inaugural IPL season, conducted in January 2008, the Chennai team bought a number of contemporary star cricketers such as M.S. Dhoni, Matthew Hayden, Stephen Fleming, Muttiah Muralitharan and Michael Hussey. Dhoni became the costliest player of the auction, as the Chennai franchise bought him for $1.5 million. They also bought Indian players such as Suresh Raina, Parthiv Patel, Lakshmipathy Balaji and Joginder Sharma and foreign players like Makhaya Ntini, Albie Morkel and Jacob Oram. Apart from these they signed several Indian domestic players like Subramaniam Badrinath, Manpreet Gony, Ravichandran Ashwin, Vidyut Sivaramakrishnan, Anirudha Srikkanth, Sudeep Tyagi, Shadab Jakati and Abhinav Mukund.

== Squad ==
Players with international caps before the start of the 2008 IPL season are listed in bold.

| No. | Name | Nationality | Birth date | Batting style | Bowling style | Notes |
Batsmen
| 03 | **Suresh Raina** | India | 27 November 1986 (aged 21) | Left-handed | Right-arm off break | Vice Captain |
| 06 | Abhinav Mukund | India | 6 January 1990 (aged 18) | Left-handed | Right-arm leg break | |
| 10 | Anirudha Srikkanth | India | 14 April 1987 (aged 20) | Right-handed | Right-arm off break | |
| 12 | Vidyut Sivaramakrishnan | India | 3 December 1981 (aged 26) | Left-handed | Slow left arm orthodox | |
| 28 | **Matthew Hayden** | Australia | 29 October 1971 (aged 36) | Left-handed | Right-arm medium | Overseas |
| 33 | Subramaniam Badrinath | India | 30 August 1980 (aged 27) | Right-handed | Right-arm off break | |
| 42 | Arun Karthik | India | 15 February 1986 (aged 22) | Right-handed | Right-arm leg break | |
| 43 | **Stephen Fleming** | New Zealand | 1 April 1973 (aged 35) | Left-handed | | Overseas |
| 48 | **Michael Hussey** | Australia | 27 May 1975 (aged 32) | Left-handed | Right-arm medium | Overseas |
| | **Chamara Kapugedera** | Sri Lanka | 24 February 1987 (aged 21) | Right-handed | Right-arm medium | Overseas |
All-rounders
| 24 | **Jacob Oram** | New Zealand | 28 July 1978 (aged 29) | Left-handed | Right arm medium-fast | Overseas |
| 81 | **Albie Morkel** | South Africa | 10 June 1981 (aged 26) | Left-handed | Right arm medium-fast | Overseas |
| | Selvam Suresh Kumar | India | . 20 March 1985 (aged 23) | Right-handed | Right-arm off break | |
| | Napoleon Einstein | India | 16 August 1989 (aged 18) | Right-handed | Right-arm off break | |
Wicket-keepers
| 07 | **Mahendra Singh Dhoni** | India | 7 July 1981 (aged 26) | Right-handed | Right-arm medium | Captain |
| 09 | **Parthiv Patel** | India | 9 March 1985 (aged 23) | Left-handed | – | |
Bowlers
| 08 | **Muttiah Muralitharan** | Sri Lanka | 17 April 1971 (aged 36) | Right-handed | Right-arm off break | Overseas |
| 11 | **Lakshmipathy Balaji** | India | 27 August 1981 (aged 26) | Right-handed | Right-arm fast-medium | |
| 13 | **Joginder Sharma** | India | 23 October 1983 (aged 24) | Right-handed | Right-arm fast-medium | |
| 14 | Ravichandran Ashwin | India | 17 September 1986 (aged 21) | Right-handed | Right-arm off break | |
| 16 | **Makhaya Ntini** | South Africa | 6 July 1977 (aged 30) | Right-handed | Right arm fast-medium | Overseas |
| 17 | Sudeep Tyagi | India | 19 September 1987 (aged 20) | Right-handed | Right-arm medium-fast | Withdrew from tournament |
| 21 | Palani Amarnath | India | 1 June 1982 (aged 25) | Right-handed | Right-arm medium-fast | |
| 25 | Shadab Jakati | India | 27 November 1980 (aged 27) | Left-handed | Slow left arm orthodox | |
| 76 | Manpreet Gony | India | 4 January 1984 (aged 24) | Right-handed | Right-arm medium-fast | |
| | Viraj Kadbe | India | 19 November 1989 (aged 18) | Right-handed | Right-arm leg break | |

== Indian Premier League ==
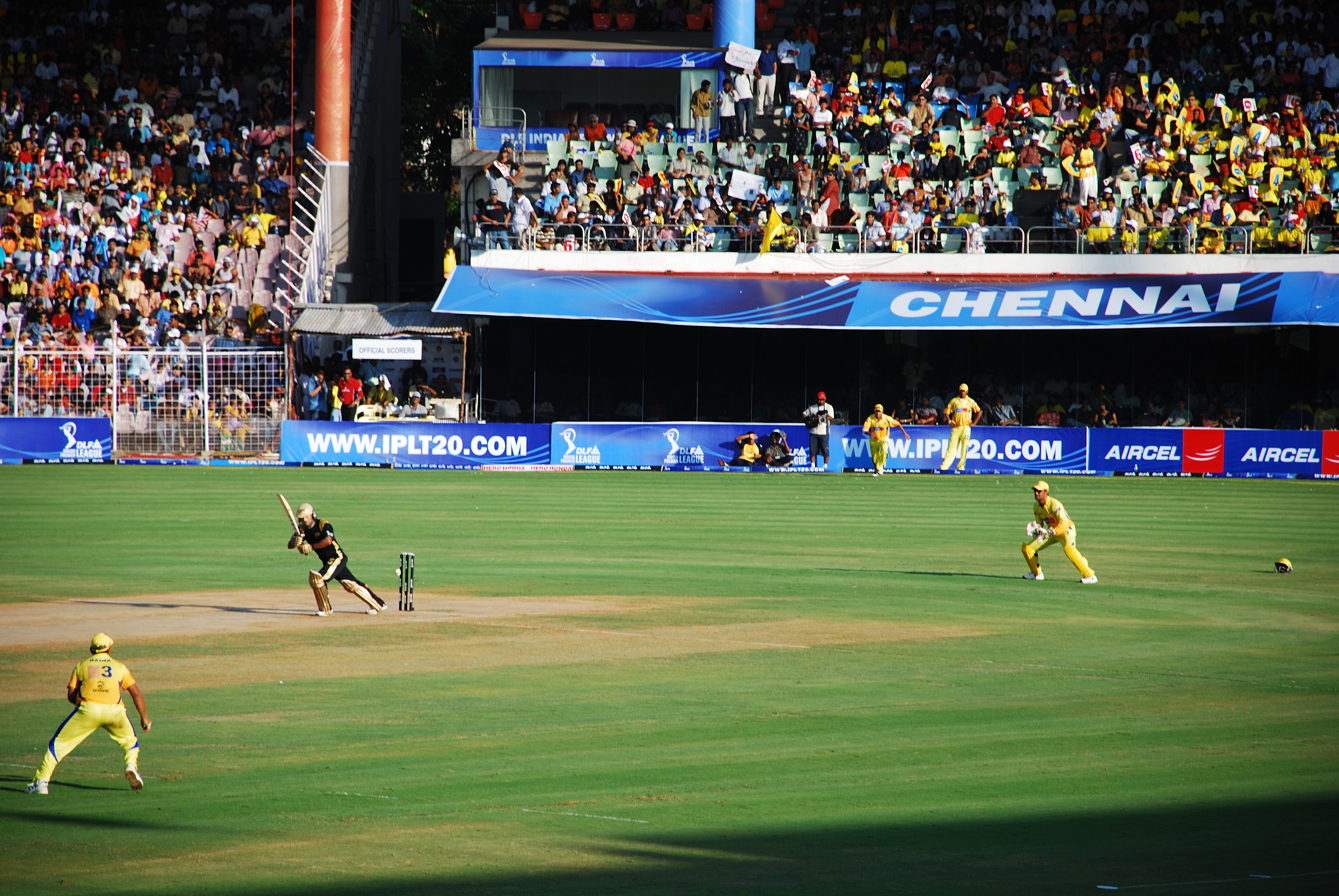
Chennai Super Kings playing the Kolkata Knight Riders at the M.A. Chidambaram Cricket Stadium in the 2008 IPL.

The Super Kings won their first game against Kings XI Punjab by 33 runs, after scoring 240/5 which was the highest total of the tournament, a record surpassed by themselves in 2010 by scoring 246 runs. Chennai also managed to win a close match against Mumbai Indians by 6 runs despite Mumbai batsman Abhishek Nayar scoring an unbeaten 45. Then they went on to beat Kolkata Knight Riders comfortably by 9 wickets and Royal Challengers Bangalore by 13 runs in their next two games. But their winning run in the tournament took a hit when their overseas stars Matthew Hayden, Michael Hussey and Jacob Oram had to leave for national duties. Their departure immediately affected their performance as they lost their next three games. The batting, although inconsistent, eventually adjusted to the losses of Hayden and Hussey with contributions from Mahendra Singh Dhoni, Suresh Raina and Albie Morkel. In the home game against Delhi Daredevils, CSK were unable to defend a target of 170 due to half-centuries by Delhi openers Virender Sehwag and Gautam Gambhir. At Jaipur against the home team Rajasthan Royals, the Super Kings batsmen struggled against Pakistani fast-bowler Sohail Tanvir who picked up the best bowling figures in the IPL 2008 (6/14). This was also the best bowling figures in a Twenty20 match until 2011, when Somerset spinner Arul Suppiah took figures of 6 for 5 against Glamorgan. CSK lost another home game to Deccan Chargers which was only the second victory for the latter in the tournament. Chennai beat Delhi Daredevils in their next game by chasing a target of 188, mainly due to the cameos by Vidyut Sivaramakrishnan, Fleming and Morkel. In their next game, Chennai defeated Kings XI Punjab by 18 runs after Subramaniam Badrinath and skipper Dhoni scored half-centuries. The match also witnessed Chennai's Lakshmipathy Balaji claiming the first hat-trick of the tournament and in the process also getting the first five-for (5/24 in 4 overs) in IPL history. However, they were crushed by the Mumbai Indians in Mumbai as opener Sanath Jayasuriya struck an unbeaten 114 off just 48 balls for the home team, to hand a 9-wicket defeat to the Super Kings. In their eleventh match of the season, they beat the Kolkata Knight Riders by 3 runs (D/L method) in a rain-affected match at the Eden Gardens. In the same match, Makhaya Ntini took the third hat-trick of the tournament and won the Man of the match award for his 4/32 in 4 overs. The Super Kings were unable to chase down a modest total of 127 despite being 60/0 at one stage and suffered a shock defeat at the hands of Royal Challengers Bangalore. In another home game, against Rajasthan Royals, CSK went down by 10 runs chasing 212. Albie Morkel's all-round efforts (2/35 in 4 overs and 71 off 40 balls) went in vain as the Super Kings succumbed to a second straight defeat. In their last league fixture, the Super Kings could easily beat the struggling Deccan Chargers by 7 wickets, with Raina scoring an unbeaten half-century. The Super Kings managed to get a semi-final spot with this win as they finished in third place in the league table with 16 points.

The side played their semi-final against the Kings XI Punjab, whom they managed to defeat by 9 wickets, thus entering the final. Electing to bat first, Kings XI scored only 112/8 in their 20 overs as Chennai bowlers dented the innings with wickets at regular intervals. Suresh Raina and Parthiv Patel scored unbeaten fifties and took the team to victory with more than five overs to spare. The Chennai outfit faced the resurgent Rajasthan Royals in the final which was played at the DY Patil Stadium in Navi Mumbai. Batting first, Chennai made a decent total, 163/5, in their 20 overs, with Raina top-scoring with 43 and Parthiv Patel also contributing 38 runs. Rajasthan's run-chase was in trouble at one stage, with the scoreboard reading 42/3 in the seventh over. However, Rajasthan's all-rounder Shane Watson added 57 runs for the fourth wicket with Yusuf Pathan, who went on to score 56 off just 39 balls. With 8 required off the last over for the Royals with 3 wickets in hand, the match went down to the last ball, off which Sohail Tanvir scored a single to give his side the victory. Royals' all-rounder Yusuf Pathan won the Man-of-the-Match award for his all-round performance. The Chennai Super Kings won $600,000 prize money as they finished the tournament as runners-up.

=== Season standings ===
| Pos | Team | Pld | W | L | NR | Pts | NRR |
|---|---|---|---|---|---|---|---|
| 1 | Rajasthan Royals (C) | 14 | 11 | 3 | 0 | 22 | 0.632 |
| 2 | Kings XI Punjab | 14 | 10 | 4 | 0 | 20 | 0.509 |
| 3 | Chennai Super Kings (R) | 14 | 8 | 6 | 0 | 16 | −0.192 |
| 4 | Delhi Daredevils | 14 | 7 | 6 | 1 | 15 | 0.342 |
| 5 | Mumbai Indians | 14 | 7 | 7 | 0 | 14 | 0.570 |
| 6 | Kolkata Knight Riders | 14 | 6 | 7 | 1 | 13 | −0.147 |
| 7 | Royal Challengers Bangalore | 14 | 4 | 10 | 0 | 8 | −1.160 |
| 8 | Deccan Chargers | 14 | 2 | 12 | 0 | 4 | −0.467 |

Source: ESPNcricinfo

(C) = Eventual champion; (R) = Runner-up.

=== Match log ===
| No | Date | Opponent | Venue | Result | Scorecard link |
|---|---|---|---|---|---|
| 1 | 19 April | Kings XI Punjab | Mohali | Won by 33 runs, MoM – Michael Hussey 116* (54) | Scorecard |
| 2 | 23 April | Mumbai Indians | Chennai | Won by 6 runs, MoM – Matthew Hayden 81 (46) | Scorecard |
| 3 | 26 April | Kolkata Knight Riders | Chennai | Won by 9 wickets, MoM – Jacob Oram 3/32 (4 overs) | Scorecard |
| 4 | 28 April | Royal Challengers Bangalore | Bangalore | Won by 13 runs, MoM – Mahendra Singh Dhoni 65 (30) | Scorecard |
| 5 | 2 May | Delhi Daredevils | Chennai | Lost by 8 wickets | Scorecard |
| 6 | 4 May | Rajasthan Royals | Jaipur | Lost by 8 wickets | Scorecard |
| 7 | 6 May | Deccan Chargers | Chennai | Lost by 7 wickets | Scorecard |
| 8 | 8 May | Delhi Daredevils | Delhi | Won by 4 Wickets, MoM – Mahendra Singh Dhoni 33 (33) | Scorecard |
| 9 | 10 May | Kings XI Punjab | Chennai | Won by 18 runs, MoM – Lakshmipathy Balaji 5/24 (4 overs) | Scorecard |
| 10 | 14 May | Mumbai Indians | Mumbai | Lost by 9 wickets | Scorecard |
| 11 | 18 May | Kolkata Knight Riders | Kolkata | Won by 3 runs (D/L method), MoM – Makhaya Ntini 4/21 (4 overs) | Scorecard |
| 12 | 21 May | Royal Challengers Bangalore | Chennai | Lost by 14 runs | Scorecard |
| 13 | 24 May | Rajasthan Royals | Chennai | Lost by 10 runs, MoM – Albie Morkel 2/35 (4 overs) and 71 (40) | Scorecard |
| 14 | 27 May | Deccan Chargers | Hyderabad | Won by 7 wickets, MoM – Suresh Raina 54* (43) | Scorecard |
| 15 | 31 May | Kings XI Punjab (Semi-final) | Mumbai | Won by 9 wickets, MoM – Makhaya Ntini 2/23 (4 overs) | Scorecard |
| 16 | 1 June | Rajasthan Royals (Final) | Navi Mumbai | Lost by 3 wickets | Scorecard |
Overall Record of 9 – 7 Runners-up of the 2008 Indian Premier League

=== Most runs ===
| Player | Innings | Runs | Average | Strike rate | Highest Score | 100s | 50s |
|---|---|---|---|---|---|---|---|
| Suresh Raina | 14 | 456 | 38.27 | 142.71 | 55* | 0 | 3 |
| MS Dhoni | 14 | 414 | 41.40 | 133.54 | 65 | 0 | 2 |
| Parthiv Patel | 13 | 302 | 27.45 | 101.68 | 54 | 0 | 2 |
| Albie Morkel | 10 | 241 | 34.42 | 147.85 | 71 | 0 | 1 |
| Stephen Fleming | 10 | 196 | 21.77 | 118.78 | 45 | 0 | 0 |

=== Most wickets ===
| Player | Innings | Wickets | Average | Economy rate | Best Bowling | 4w |
|---|---|---|---|---|---|---|
| Albie Morkel | 13 | 17 | 23.47 | 8.31 | 4/32 | 1 |
| Manpreet Gony | 16 | 17 | 26.05 | 7.38 | 3/34 | 0 |
| Lakshmipathy Balaji | 9 | 11 | 26.00 | 8.66 | 5/24 | 1 |
| Muttiah Muralitharan | 15 | 11 | 36.72 | 6.96 | 2/39 | 0 |
| Joginder Sharma | 7 | 8 | 28.87 | 9.68 | 2/27 | 0 |

== Champions League Twenty20 ==
Chennai Super Kings, being the runners-up of the IPL, were among the first sides to secure a berth for the event. However, the tournament was cancelled due to 2008 Mumbai Attacks and Chennai Super Kings, along with Rajasthan Royals, received $1.3 million as compensation.
