= 2008 Indian Premier League =

Cricket tournament

- Dates: 18 April 2008 – 1 June 2008
- Administrator: Board of Control for Cricket in India
- Cricket format: Twenty20
- Tournament format(s): Double round-robin and knockout
- Champions: Rajasthan Royals (1st title)
- Runners-up: Chennai Super Kings
- Participants: 8
- Matches: 59
- Player of the series: Shane Watson (RR)
- Most runs: Shaun Marsh (KXIP) (616)
- Most wickets: Sohail Tanvir (RR) (22)
- Official website: www.iplt20.com

The 2008 Indian Premier League season was the inaugural season of the Indian Premier League, established by the BCCI in 2007. The season commenced on 18 April 2008 with the final match was held on 1 June 2008. The competition started with a double round robin league stage, in which each of the 8 teams played a home match and an away match against every other team. These matches were followed by two semi-finals and a final.

In a match which went down to the last ball, Rajasthan Royals defeated Chennai Super Kings in the final to win the title, with Yusuf Pathan named the player of the match in the Finals and Shane Watson adjudged the player of the tournament. Sohail Tanvir won the purple cap for being the top wicket-taking bowler while Shaun Marsh won the orange cap for leading run-scorer in the tournament. Shreevats Goswami was awarded the best under-19 player award and the special award for Fair Play was won by the CSK.

The inaugural season was the only season where players from Pakistan national team were a part of different IPL franchises. However, following the November 2008 terror attacks in Mumbai, which was perpetrated by the Pakistan-based militant group Lashkar-e-Taiba, geopolitical tensions led to exclusion of Pakistani players from subsequent IPL seasons.

== Auctions and personnel signings ==
The auctions for team ownership was held on January 24, 2008. Mumbai was the most expensive team, costing over US$111.9 million. For the inaugural IPL season, each team had a salary cap of US$5 million (Rs. 20 crore approx.). Sachin Tendulkar, Sourav Ganguly, Rahul Dravid, Yuvraj Singh and Virender Sehwag were classified as icon players. They played for the franchises representing their home towns and hence did not enter the auction. Few players were classified as marquee players and the teams which lost out on icon players were allowed one extra marquee player to be selected in the auction. The first auction was conducted on 20 February 2008 with Mahendra Singh Dhoni winning the highest bid of US$1.5 million. Andrew Symonds was most expensive foreign player. A further second auction was held for few foreign players signed. Teams also signed players on individual basis.

== Venues ==
Chennai	Mumbai	Mohali
Chennai Super Kings	Mumbai Indians	Kings XI Punjab
M. A. Chidambaram Stadium; Capacity: 50,000	Wankhede Stadium; Capacity: 45,000	PCA Stadium; Capacity: 30,000
Kolkata	Bangalore	Navi Mumbai
Kolkata Knight Riders	Royal Challengers Bangalore	Mumbai Indians
Eden Gardens; Capacity: 80,000	M. Chinnaswamy Stadium; Capacity: 55,000	DY Patil Stadium; Capacity: 55,000
Hyderabad	Delhi	Jaipur
Deccan Chargers	Delhi Daredevils	Rajasthan Royals
Rajiv Gandhi International Cricket Stadium; Capacity: 55,000	Feroz Shah Kotla Stadium; Capacity: 48,000	Sawai Mansingh Stadium; Capacity: 30,000
2008 Indian Premier League is located in India

== Rules and regulations ==
Points in the group stage were awarded as follows:

Points
Results	Points
Win	2 points
No result	1 point
Loss	0 points

In the event of tied scores after both teams have faced their quota of overs, a bowl-out will determine the winner, even in the group stage.

In the group stage, teams will be ranked on the following criteria:

1. Higher number of points
2. If equal, higher number of wins
3. If still equal, net run rate
4. If still equal, lower bowling strike rate
5. If still equal, result of head-to-head meeting.

== Teams and standings ==
=== Points table ===
Pos	Team	Pld	W	L	NR	Pts	NRR
1	Rajasthan Royals (C)	14	11	3	0	22	0.632
2	Kings XI Punjab	14	10	4	0	20	0.509
3	Chennai Super Kings (R)	14	8	6	0	16	−0.192
4	Delhi Daredevils	14	7	6	1	15	0.342
5	Mumbai Indians	14	7	7	0	14	0.570
6	Kolkata Knight Riders	14	6	7	1	13	−0.147
7	Royal Challengers Bangalore	14	4	10	0	8	−1.160
8	Deccan Chargers	14	2	12	0	4	−0.467

Source: ESPNcricinfo

(C) = Eventual champion; (R) = Runner-up.

=== Match summary ===
Visitor team →	CSK	DC	DD	KXIP	KKR	MI	RR	RCB
Home team ↓	CSK	DC	DD	KXIP	KKR	MI	RR	RCB
Chennai Super Kings		Deccan; 8 wickets	Delhi; 8 wickets	Chennai; 18 runs	Chennai; 9 wickets	Chennai; 6 runs	Rajasthan; 10 runs	Bengaluru; 14 runs
Deccan Chargers	Chennai; 7 wickets		Delhi; 9 wickets	Punjab; 7 wickets	Kolkata; 23 runs	Mumbai; 25 runs	Rajasthan; 3 wickets	Bengaluru; 5 wickets
Delhi Daredevils	Chennai; 4 wickets	Delhi; 12 runs		Punjab; 6 runs (D/L)	Match abandoned	Delhi; 5 wickets	Delhi; 9 wickets	Delhi; 10 runs
Kings XI Punjab	Chennai; 33 runs	Punjab; 6 wickets	Punjab; 4 wickets		Punjab; 9 runs	Punjab; 66 runs	Punjab; 41 runs	Punjab; 9 wickets
Kolkata Knight Riders	Chennai; 3 runs (D/L)	Kolkata; 5 wickets	Kolkata; 23 runs	Kolkata; 3 wickets		Mumbai; 7 wickets	Rajasthan; 6 wickets	Kolkata; 5 runs
Mumbai Indians	Mumbai; 9 wickets	Deccan; 10 wickets	Mumbai; 29 runs	Punjab; 1 run	Mumbai; 8 wickets		Mumbai; 7 wickets	Bengaluru; 5 wickets
Rajasthan Royals	Rajasthan; 8 wickets	Rajasthan; 8 wickets	Rajasthan; 3 wickets	Rajasthan; 6 wickets	Rajasthan; 45 runs	Rajasthan; 5 wickets		Rajasthan; 65 runs
Royal Challengers Bengaluru	Chennai; 13 runs	Bengaluru; 3 runs	Delhi; 5 wickets	Punjab; 6 wickets	Kolkata; 140 runs	Mumbai; 9 wickets	Rajasthan; 7 wickets	

Home team won	Visitor team won

- Note: Results listed are according to the home (horizontal) and visitor (vertical) teams.
- Note: Click on a result to see a summary of the match.

Team	Group matches														Knockout	
Team	1	2	3	4	5	6	7	8	9	10	11	12	13	14	SF	F
Chennai Super Kings	2	4	6	8	8	8	8	10	12	12	14	14	14	16	W	L
Deccan Chargers	0	0	0	2	2	2	4	4	4	4	4	4	4	4		
Delhi Daredevils	2	4	4	6	8	8	8	8	8	10	10	12	13	15	L	
Kings XI Punjab	0	0	2	4	6	8	10	10	12	14	16	18	18	20	L	
Kolkata Knight Riders	2	4	4	4	4	4	6	8	10	10	10	10	11	13		
Mumbai Indians	0	0	0	0	2	4	6	8	10	12	12	12	12	14		
Rajasthan Royals	0	2	4	6	8	10	10	12	14	16	18	20	22	22	W	W
Royal Challengers Bengaluru	0	2	2	2	2	4	4	4	4	4	4	6	8	8		

Win	Loss	No result

- Note: The total points at the end of each group match are listed.
- Note: Click on the points (group matches) or W/L (playoffs) to see the match summary.

== League stage ==
=== Matches ===
18 April 2008
20:00 (D/N)
Scorecard

Kolkata Knight Riders; 222/3 (20 overs)	v	Royal Challengers Bangalore (H); 82 all out (15.1 overs)
Brendon McCullum 158* (73); Zaheer Khan 1/38 (4 overs)		Praveen Kumar 18* (15); Ajit Agarkar 3/25 (4 overs)

Kolkata won by 140 runs
M. Chinnaswamy Stadium, Bangalore
Umpires: Asad Rauf and Rudi Koertzen
Player of the match: Brendon McCullum (Kolkata)

- Royal Challengers Bangalore won the toss and elected to field.

19 April 2008
17:00 (D/N)
Scorecard

Chennai Super Kings; 240/5 (20 overs)	v	Kings XI Punjab (H); 207/4 (20 overs)
Michael Hussey 116* (54); Irfan Pathan 2/47 (4 overs)		James Hopes 71 (33); Muttiah Muralitharan 1/33 (4 overs)

Chennai won by 33 runs
Punjab Cricket Association Stadium, Mohali
Umpires: Mark Benson and Suresh Shastri
Player of the match: Michael Hussey (Chennai)

- Chennai Super Kings won the toss and elected to bat.

19 April 2008
20:30 (D/N)
Scorecard

Rajasthan Royals; 129/8 (20 overs)	v	Delhi Daredevils (H); 132/1 (15.1 overs)
Ravindra Jadeja 29 (23); Farveez Maharoof 2/11 (4 overs)		Gautam Gambhir 58* (46); Shane Watson 1/31 (4 overs)

Delhi won by 9 wickets
Feroz Shah Kotla, Delhi
Umpires: Aleem Dar and GA Pratapkumar
Player of the match: Farveez Maharoof (Delhi)

- Rajasthan Royals won the toss and elected to bat.

20 April 2008
16:00 (D/N)
Scorecard

Deccan Chargers; 110 all out (18.4 overs)	v	Kolkata Knight Riders (H); 112/5 (19 overs)
Andrew Symonds 32 (39); Murali Kartik 3/17 (3.4 overs)		David Hussey 38* (43); Chaminda Vaas 2/9 (3 overs)

Kolkata won by 5 wickets
Eden Gardens, Kolkata
Umpires: Billy Bowden and Krishna Hariharan
Player of the match: David Hussey (Kolkata)

- Deccan Chargers won the toss and elected to bat.

20 April 2008
20:00 (D/N)
Scorecard

(H) Mumbai Indians; 165/6 (20 overs)	v	Royal Challengers Bangalore; 166/5 (19.4 overs)
Robin Uthappa 48 (38); Zaheer Khan 2/17 (4 overs)		Mark Boucher 39* (19); Harbhajan Singh 2/36 (4 overs)

Bangalore won by 5 wickets
Wankhede Stadium, Mumbai
Umpires: Steve Davis and Daryl Harper
Player of the match: Mark Boucher (Bangalore)

- Mumbai Indians won the toss and elected to bat.

21 April 2008
20:00 (D/N)
Scorecard

Kings XI Punjab; 166/8 (20 overs)	v	Rajasthan Royals (H); 168/4 (18.1 overs)
Yuvraj Singh 57 (34); Shane Warne 3/19 (4 overs)		Shane Watson 76* (49); Irfan Pathan 1/21 (4 overs)

Rajasthan won by 6 wickets
Sawai Mansingh Stadium, Jaipur
Umpires: Aleem Dar and Russell Tiffin
Player of the match: Shane Watson (Rajasthan)

- Kings XI Punjab won the toss and elected to bat.

22 April 2008
20:00 (D/N)
Scorecard

(H) Deccan Chargers; 142/8 (20 overs)	v	Delhi Daredevils; 143/1 (13 overs)
Rohit Sharma 66 (36); Mohammad Asif 2/19 (4 overs)		Virender Sehwag 94* (41); R. P. Singh 1/27 (3 overs)

Delhi won by 9 wickets
Rajiv Gandhi International Cricket Stadium, Hyderabad
Umpires: Ian Howell and Amiesh Saheba
Player of the match: Virender Sehwag (Delhi)

- Deccan Chargers won the toss and elected to bat.

23 April 2008
20:00 (D/N)
Scorecard

(H) Chennai Super Kings; 208/5 (20 overs)	v	Mumbai Indians; 202/7 (20 overs)
Matthew Hayden 81 (46); Musavir Khote 2/29 (3 overs)		Abhishek Nayar 45* (20); Joginder Sharma 2/29 (4 overs)

Chennai won by 6 runs
M. A. Chidambaram Stadium, Chennai
Umpires: Daryl Harper and GA Pratapkumar
Player of the match: Matthew Hayden (Chennai)

- Mumbai Indians won the toss and elected to field.

24 April 2008
20:00 (D/N)
Scorecard

(H) Deccan Chargers; 214/5 (20 overs)	v	Rajasthan Royals; 217/7 (19.5 overs)
Andrew Symonds 117* (53); Yusuf Pathan 2/20 (2 overs)		Graeme Smith 71 (45); Shahid Afridi 3/28 (4 overs)

Rajasthan won by 3 wickets
Rajiv Gandhi International Cricket Stadium, Hyderabad
Umpires: Asad Rauf and Mark Benson
Player of the match: Yusuf Pathan (Rajasthan)

- Rajasthan Royals won the toss and elected to field.

25 April 2008
20:00 (D/N)
Scorecard

(H) Kings XI Punjab; 182 all out (20 overs)	v	Mumbai Indians; 116/9 (20 overs)
Kumar Sangakkara 94 (56); Harbhajan Singh 3/32 (4 overs)		Dwayne Bravo 23 (21); Piyush Chawla 2/16 (4 overs)

Punjab won by 66 runs
Punjab Cricket Association Stadium, Mohali
Umpires: Aleem Dar and Amiesh Saheba
Player of the match: Kumar Sangakkara (Punjab)

- Mumbai Indians won the toss and elected to field.

26 April 2008
16:00 (D/N)
Scorecard

Kolkata Knight Riders; 147/9 (20 overs)	v	Chennai Super Kings (H); 152/1 (17 overs)
Laxmi Ratan Shukla 42 (33); Jacob Oram 3/32 (4 overs)		Mathew Hayden 70* (49); Ajit Agarkar 1/19 (3 overs)

Chennai won by 9 wickets
M. A. Chidambaram Stadium, Chennai
Umpires: Billy Bowden and Arani Jayaprakash
Player of the match: Jacob Oram (Chennai)

- Kolkata Knight Riders won the toss and elected to bat.

26 April 2008
20:00 (D/N)
Scorecard

(H) Royal Challengers Bangalore; 135/8 (20 overs)	v	Rajasthan Royals; 138/3 (17.1 overs)
Ross Taylor 44 (20); Shane Watson 2/20 (4 overs)		Shane Watson 61* (41); Zaheer Khan 1/24 (4 overs)

Rajasthan won by 7 wickets
M. Chinnaswamy Stadium, Bangalore
Umpires: Ian Howell and Mark Benson
Player of the match: Shane Watson (Rajasthan)

- Rajasthan Royals won the toss and elected to field.

27 April 2008
16:00 (D/N)
Scorecard

Delhi Daredevils; 158/8 (20 overs)	v	Kings XI Punjab (H); 162/6 (19.3 overs)
Manoj Tiwary 39 (34); VRV Singh 3/29 (4 overs)		Simon Katich 75 (52); Mohammad Asif 2/39 (4 overs)

Punjab won by 4 wickets
Punjab Cricket Association Stadium, Mohali
Umpires: Rudi Koertzen and Ivaturi Sivaram
Player of the match: Simon Katich (Punjab)

- Delhi Daredevils won the toss and elected to bat.

27 April 2008
20:00 (D/N)
Scorecard

(H) Mumbai Indians; 154/7 (20 overs)	v	Deccan Chargers; 155/0 (12.0 overs)
Dwayne Bravo 34 (18); R. P. Singh 2/15 (4 overs)		Adam Gilchrist 109* (47); Dhawal Kulkarni 0/8 (1 over)

Deccan won by 10 wickets
DY Patil Stadium, Navi Mumbai
Umpires: Asad Rauf and Suresh Shastri
Player of the match: Adam Gilchrist (Deccan)

- Deccan Chargers won the toss and elected to field.

28 April 2008
20:00 (D/N)
Scorecard

Chennai Super Kings; 178/5 (20 overs)	v	Royal Challengers Bangalore (H); 165 all out (19.4 overs)
Mahendra Singh Dhoni 65 (30); Zaheer Khan 3/38 (4 overs)		Ross Taylor 53 (34); Manpreet Gony 3/34 (4 overs)

Chennai won by 13 runs
M. Chinnaswamy Stadium, Bangalore
Umpires: Billy Doctrove and Russell Tiffin
Player of the match: Mahendra Singh Dhoni (Chennai)

- Chennai Super Kings won the toss and elected to bat.

29 April 2008
20:00 (D/N)
Scorecard

(H) Kolkata Knight Riders; 137/8 (20 overs)	v	Mumbai Indians; 138/3 (18.4 overs)
Laxmi Ratan Shukla 40* (22); Sanath Jayasuriya 3/14 (4 overs)		Dwayne Bravo 64* (53); Ashok Dinda 1/12 (4 overs)

Mumbai won by 7 wickets
Eden Gardens, Kolkata
Umpires: Billy Bowden and Arani Jayaprakash
Player of the match: Sanath Jayasuriya (Mumbai)

- Kolkata Knight Riders won the toss and elected to bat.

30 April 2008
20:00 (D/N)
Scorecard

(H) Delhi Daredevils; 191/5 (20 overs)	v	Royal Challengers Bangalore; 181/5 (20 overs)
Gautam Gambhir 86 (54); Jacques Kallis 2/39 (4 overs)		Jacques Kallis 54 (44); Glenn McGrath 4/29 (4 overs)

Delhi won by 10 runs
Feroz Shah Kotla, Delhi
Umpires: Aleem Dar and Ivaturi Sivaram
Player of the match: Glenn McGrath (Delhi)

- Royal Challengers Bangalore won the toss and elected to field.

1 May 2008
16:00 (D/N)
Scorecard

(H) Rajasthan Royals; 196/7 (20 overs)	v	Kolkata Knight Riders; 151 all out (19.1 overs)
Swapnil Asnodkar 60 (34); Umar Gul 3/31 (4 overs)		Sourav Ganguly 51 (39); Shane Watson 2/22 (3.1 overs)

Rajasthan won by 45 runs
Sawai Mansingh Stadium, Jaipur
Umpires: Rudi Koertzen and GA Pratapkumar
Player of the match: Swapnil Asnodkar (Rajasthan)

- Rajasthan Royals won the toss and elected to bat.

1 May 2008
20:00 (D/N)
Scorecard

(H) Deccan Chargers; 164/8 (20 overs)	v	Kings XI Punjab; 167/3 (18.5 overs)
Rohit Sharma 76* (42); Piyush Chawla 3/28 (4 overs)		Shaun Marsh 84* (62); Nuwan Zoysa 1/32 (4 overs)

Punjab won by 7 wickets
Rajiv Gandhi International Cricket Stadium, Hyderabad
Umpires: Billy Doctrove and Russell Tiffin
Player of the match: Shaun Marsh (Punjab)

- Kings XI Punjab won the toss and elected to field.

2 May 2008
20:00 (D/N)
Scorecard

(H) Chennai Super Kings; 169/6 (20 overs)	v	Delhi Daredevils; 172/2 (19 overs)
Vidyut Sivaramakrishnan 54 (37); Rajat Bhatia 1/11 (1 over)		Virender Sehwag 71 (41); Joginder Sharma 1/35 (4 overs)

Delhi won by 8 wickets
M. A. Chidambaram Stadium, Chennai
Umpires: Billy Bowden and Krishna Hariharan
Player of the match: Virender Sehwag (Delhi)

- Chennai Super Kings won the toss and elected to bat.

3 May 2008
16:00 (D/N)
Scorecard

(H) Royal Challengers Bangalore; 156/8 (20 overs)	v	Deccan Chargers; 153/6 (20 overs)
Wasim Jaffer 44 (37); R. P. Singh 3/41 (4 overs)		Rohit Sharma 57 (42); Praveen Kumar 3/23 (4 overs)

Bangalore won by 3 runs
M Chinnaswamy Stadium, Bangalore
Umpires: Billy Doctrove and Suresh Shastri
Player of the match: Praveen Kumar (Bangalore)

- Deccan Chargers won the toss and elected to field.

3 May 2008
20:00 (D/N)
Scorecard

(H) Kings XI Punjab; 178/6 (20 overs)	v	Kolkata Knight Riders; 169/6 (20 overs)
Shaun Marsh 40 (32); Umar Gul 2/27 (4 overs)		David Hussey 71 (46); Irfan Pathan 2/18 (4 overs)

Punjab won by 9 runs
Punjab Cricket Association Stadium, Mohali
Umpires: Daryl Harper and Ivaturi Shivram
Player of the match: Irfan Pathan (Punjab)

- Kings XI Punjab won the toss and elected to bat.

4 May 2008
16:00 (D/N)
Scorecard

(H) Mumbai Indians; 162/8 (20 overs)	v	Delhi Daredevils; 133 all out (18.5 overs)
Sanath Jayasuriya 34 (16); Yo Mahesh 3/33 (4 overs)		Virender Sehwag 40 (20); Ashish Nehra 3/25 (4 overs)

Mumbai won by 29 runs
DY Patil Stadium, Navi Mumbai
Umpires: Rudi Koertzen and Ian Howell
Player of the match: Shaun Pollock (Mumbai)

- Delhi Daredevils won the toss and elected to field.

4 May 2008
20:00 (D/N)
Scorecard

Chennai Super Kings; 109 all out (19 overs)	v	Rajasthan Royals (H); 110/2 (14.2 overs)
Albie Morkel 42 (33); Sohail Tanvir 6/14 (4 overs)		Graeme Smith 35* (44); Muttiah Muralitharan 1/20 (4 overs)

Rajasthan won by 8 wickets
Sawai Mansingh Stadium, Jaipur
Umpires: Asad Rauf and Arani Jayaprakash
Player of the match: Sohail Tanvir (Rajasthan)

- Chennai Super Kings won the toss and elected to bat.

5 May 2008
20:00 (D/N)
Scorecard

(H) Royal Challengers Bangalore; 126 all out (19.2 overs)	v	Kings XI Punjab; 127/4 (18.2 overs)
Rahul Dravid 66 (51); Piyush Chawla 3/25 (4 overs)		Shaun Marsh 39 (34); Praveen Kumar 2/22 (4 overs)

Punjab won by 6 wickets
M. Chinnaswamy Stadium, Bangalore
Umpires: Steve Davis and Billy Doctrove
Player of the match: Sreesanth (Punjab)

- Kings XI Punjab won the toss and elected to field.

6 May 2008
20:00 (D/N)
Scorecard

(H) Chennai Super Kings; 144/7 (20 overs)	v	Deccan Chargers; 148/3 (18 overs)
Suresh Raina 32 (21); R. P. Singh 2/12 (3 overs)		Adam Gilchrist 54 (36); Manpreet Gony 1/15 (3 overs)

Deccan won by 7 wickets
M. A. Chidambaram Stadium, Chennai
Umpires: Mark Benson and Russell Tiffin
Player of the match: Adam Gilchrist (Deccan)

- Deccan Chargers won the toss and elected to field.

7 May 2008
20:00 (D/N)
Scorecard

Rajasthan Royals; 103 all out (16.2 overs)	v	Mumbai Indians (H); 104/3 (15.1 overs)
Swapnil Asnodkar 39 (36); Ashish Nehra 3/13 (3 overs)		Robin Uthappa 34* (21); Shane Watson 2/26 (4 overs)

Mumbai won by 7 wickets
DY Patil Stadium, Navi Mumbai
Umpires: Daryl Harper and Rudi Koertzen
Player of the match: Ashish Nehra (Mumbai)

- Mumbai Indians won the toss and elected to field.

8 May 2008
16:00 (D/N)
Scorecard

(H) Delhi Daredevils; 187/5 (20 overs)	v	Chennai Super Kings; 188/6 (20 overs)
Gautam Gambhir 80 (49); Balaji, J Morkel 2/35 (4 overs) each		Stephen Fleming 44 (28); Pradeep Sangwan 2/29 (4 overs)

Chennai won by 4 wickets
Feroz Shah Kotla, Delhi
Umpires: Aleem Dar and Russell Tiffin
Player of the match: M.S. Dhoni (Chennai)

- Chennai Super Kings won the toss and elected to field.

8 May 2008
20:00 (D/N)
Scorecard

(H) Kolkata Knight Riders; 129/7 (16 overs)	v	Royal Challengers Bangalore; 124/4 (16 overs)
David Hussey 26 (12); Dale Steyn 3/27 (4 overs)		Mark Boucher 50* (40); Sourav Ganguly 1/7 (3 overs)

Kolkata won by 5 runs
Eden Gardens, Kolkata
Umpires: Asad Rauf and Ian Howell
Player of the match: Sourav Ganguly (Kolkata)

- Kolkata Knight Riders won the toss and elected to bat.
- Rain reduced play to 16 overs per side.

9 May 2008
20:00 (D/N)
Scorecard

Deccan Chargers; 140/8 (20 overs)	v	Rajasthan Royals (H); 141/2 (16 overs)
Adam Gilchrist 61 (49); Shane Warne 2/20 (4 overs)		Yusuf Pathan 68 (37); R. P. Singh 1/24 (4 overs)

Rajasthan won by 8 wickets
Sawai Mansingh Stadium, Jaipur
Umpires: Mark Benson and Amiesh Saheba
Player of the match: Yusuf Pathan (Rajasthan)

- Rajasthan Royals won the toss and elected to field.

10 May 2008
20:00 (D/N)
Scorecard

(H) Chennai Super Kings; 181/4 (20 overs)	v	Kings XI Punjab; 163/9 (20 overs)
Subramaniam Badrinath 64 (47); Sreesanth 2/29 (4 overs)		Shaun Marsh 58 (38); Lakshmipathy Balaji 5/24 (4 overs)

Chennai won by 18 runs
M. A. Chidambaram Stadium, Chennai
Umpires: Arani Jayaprakash and Brian Jerling
Player of the match: Lakshmipathy Balaji (Chennai)

- Kings XI Punjab won the toss and elected to field.
- Lakshmipathy Balaji (Chennai Super Kings) took the first hat-trick in IPL.

11 May 2008
16:00 (D/N)
Scorecard

Kolkata Knight Riders; 204/4 (20 overs)	v	Deccan Chargers (H); 181/7 (20 overs)
Sourav Ganguly 91 (57); Paidikalva Vijaykumar 1/21 (3 overs)		Venugopal Rao 71* (42); Ashok Dinda 3/33 (4 overs)

Kolkata won by 23 runs
Rajiv Gandhi International Cricket Stadium, Hyderabad
Umpires: Aleem Dar and Amiesh Saheba
Player of the match: Sourav Ganguly (Kolkata)

- Kolkata Knight Riders won the toss and elected to bat.

11 May 2008
20:00 (D/N)
Scorecard

Delhi Daredevils; 156/7 (20 overs)	v	Rajasthan Royals (H); 159/7 (19.1 overs)
Farveez Maharoof 39 (16); Shane Watson 2/21 (4 overs)		Shane Watson 74 (40); Amit Mishra 2/27 (3 overs)

Rajasthan won by 3 wickets
Sawai Mansingh Stadium, Jaipur
Umpires: Steve Davis and Rudi Koertzen
Player of the match: Shane Watson (Rajasthan)

- Rajasthan Royals won the toss and elected to field.

12 May 2008
20:00 (D/N)
Scorecard

Royal Challengers Bangalore; 143/8 (20 overs)	v	Kings XI Punjab (H); 144/1 (15.4 overs)
Mark Boucher 39 (32); Sreesanth 3/29 (4 overs)		Shaun Marsh 74* (51); Vinay Kumar 1/11 (2 overs)

Punjab won by 9 wickets
Punjab Cricket Association Stadium, Mohali
Umpires: Daryl Harper and Ivaturi Shivram
Player of the match: Shaun Marsh (Punjab)

- Royal Challengers Bangalore won the toss and elected to bat.

13 May 2008
20:00 (D/N)
Scorecard

(H) Kolkata Knight Riders; 133/6 (20 overs)	v	Delhi Daredevils; 110 all out (17.5 overs)
Salman Butt 48 (44); Farveez Maharoof 2/25 (4 overs)		Amit Mishra 31 (32); Shoaib Akhtar 4/11 (3 overs)

Kolkata won by 23 runs
Eden Gardens, Kolkata
Umpires: Asad Rauf and Ian Howell
Player of the match: Shoaib Akhtar (Kolkata)

- Kolkata Knight Riders won the toss and elected to bat.

14 May 2008
20:00 (D/N)
Scorecard

Chennai Super Kings; 156/6 (20 overs)	v	Mumbai Indians (H); 158/1 (13.5 overs)
Subramaniam Badrinath 53 (33); Dhawal Kulkarni 3/33 (4 overs)		Sanath Jayasuriya 114* (48); Joginder Sharma 1/24 (3 overs)

Mumbai won by 9 wickets
Wankhede Stadium, Mumbai
Umpires: Billy Doctrove and Amiesh Saheba
Player of the match: Sanath Jayasuriya (Mumbai)

- Mumbai Indians won the toss and elected to field.

15 May 2008
20:00 (D/N)
Scorecard

(H) Delhi Daredevils; 194/4 (20 overs)	v	Deccan Chargers; 182/9 (20 overs)
Gautam Gambhir 79 (48); Pragyan Ojha 2/19 (2 overs)		Rohit Sharma 35 (18); Amit Mishra 5/17 (4 overs)

Delhi won by 12 runs
Feroz Shah Kotla, Delhi
Umpires: Brian Jerling and GA Pratapkumar
Player of the match: Amit Mishra (Delhi)

- Deccan Chargers won the toss and elected to field.
- Amit Mishra (Delhi Daredevils) took a hat-trick.

16 May 2008
20:00 (D/N)
Scorecard

Kolkata Knight Riders; 67 all out (15.2 overs)	v	Mumbai Indians (H); 68/2 (5.3 overs)
Ajit Agarkar 15 (14); Shaun Pollock 3/12 (4 overs)		Sanath Jayasuriya 48* (17); Ishant Sharma 1/29 (2.3 overs)

Mumbai won by 8 wickets
Wankhede Stadium, Mumbai
Umpires: Billy Doctrove and Daryl Harper
Player of the match: Shaun Pollock (Mumbai)

- Mumbai Indians won the toss and elected to field.

17 May 2008
16:00 (D/N)
Scorecard

(H) Rajasthan Royals; 197/1 (20 overs)	v	Royal Challengers Bangalore; 132/9 (20 overs)
Graeme Smith 75* (49); Anil Kumble 1/32 (4 overs)		Rahul Dravid 75* (36); Sohail Tanvir 3/10 (4 overs)

Rajasthan won by 65 runs
Sawai Mansingh Stadium, Jaipur
Umpires: Billy Bowden and Suresh Shastri
Player of the match: Graeme Smith (Rajasthan)

- Royal Challengers Bangalore won the toss and elected to field.

17 May 2008
20:00 (D/N)
Scorecard

(H) Delhi Daredevils; 118/4 (11 overs)	v	Kings XI Punjab; 94/3 (8 overs)
Virender Sehwag 51* (26); James Hopes 2/2 (1 overs)		Mahela Jayawardene 36* (17); Pradeep Sangwan 1/12 (1 over)

Punjab won by 6 runs (D/L)
Feroz Shah Kotla, Delhi
Umpires: Arani Jayaprakash and Rudi Koertzen
Player of the match: Mahela Jayawardene (Punjab)

- Delhi Daredevils won the toss and elected to bat.
- Rain interrupted play after during Delhi's innings and reduced the match to 11 overs per side. Rain then ended play after 8 overs in Punjab's innings. Their par score was 88 runs according to the Duckworth–Lewis method.

18 May 2008
16:00 (D/N)
Scorecard

(H) Kolkata Knight Riders; 149/5 (20 overs)	v	Chennai Super Kings; 55/0 (8 overs)
Salman Butt 73 (54); Makhaya Ntini 4/21 (4 overs)		Stephen Fleming 32* (20)

Chennai won by 3 runs (D/L)
Eden Gardens, Kolkata
Umpires: Asad Rauf and Krishna Hariharan
Player of the match: Makhaya Ntini (Chennai)

- Kolkata Knight Riders won the toss and elected to bat.
- Rain ended play after 8 overs in Chennai's innings. Their par score was 52 runs according to the Duckworth–Lewis method.
- Makhaya Ntini (Chennai Super Kings) took a hat-trick.

18 May 2008
20:00 (D/N)
Scorecard

Mumbai Indians; 178/7 (20 overs)	v	Deccan Chargers (H); 153/7 (20 overs)
Abhishek Nayar 38 (24); R. P. Singh 3/35 (4 overs)		Venugopal Rao 57 (38); Dwayne Bravo 3/24 (4 overs)

Mumbai won by 25 runs
Rajiv Gandhi International Cricket Stadium, Hyderabad
Umpires: Billy Doctrove and Daryl Harper
Player of the match: Dwayne Bravo (Mumbai)

- Deccan Chargers won the toss and elected to field.
- Deccan Chargers were eliminated as a result of this match.

19 May 2008
20:00 (D/N)
Scorecard

(H) Royal Challengers Bangalore; 154/7 (20 overs)	v	Delhi Daredevils; 158/5 (18.2 overs)
Shreevats Goswami 52 (42); Farveez Maharoof 2/13 (4 overs)		Virender Sehwag 47 (19); Anil Kumble 2/18 (4 overs)

Delhi won by 5 wickets
M. Chinnaswamy Stadium, Bangalore
Umpires: Steve Davis and GA Pratapkumar
Player of the match: Shreevats Goswami (Bangalore)

- Delhi Daredevils won the toss and elected to field.
- Royal Challengers Bangalore were eliminated as a result of this match.

20 May 2008
20:00 (D/N)
Scorecard

(H) Kolkata Knight Riders; 147/8 (20 overs)	v	Rajasthan Royals; 150/4 (16.3 overs)
Sourav Ganguly 32 (34); Sohail Tanvir 3/26 (4 overs)		Yusuf Pathan 48* (18); Umar Gul 2/30 (3.3 overs)

Rajasthan won by 6 wickets
Eden Gardens, Kolkata
Umpires: Brian Jerling and Rudi Koertzen
Player of the match: Yusuf Pathan (Rajasthan)

- Rajasthan Royals won the toss and elected to field.
- Rajasthan Royals qualified for playoffs as a result of this match.

21 May 2008
16:00 (D/N)
Scorecard

Kings XI Punjab; 189/4 (20 overs)	v	Mumbai Indians (H); 188 all out (20 overs)
Shaun Marsh 81 (56); Siddharth Chitnis 2/40 (4 overs)		Sachin Tendulkar 65 (46); Yuvraj Singh 2/12 (2 overs)

Punjab won by 1 run
Wankhede Stadium, Mumbai
Umpires: Billy Bowden and GA Pratapkumar
Player of the match: Shaun Marsh (Punjab)

- Mumbai Indians won the toss and elected to field.
- Mumbai Indians 5 run outs in their innings is a record in the IPL

21 May 2008
20:00 (D/N)
Scorecard

Royal Challengers Bangalore; 126/8 (20 overs)	v	Chennai Super Kings (H); 112/8 (20 overs)
Rahul Dravid 47 (39); Albie Morkel 4/32 (4 overs)		Stephen Fleming 45 (40); Anil Kumble 3/14 (4 overs)

Bangalore won by 14 runs
M. A. Chidambaram Stadium, Chennai
Umpires: Daryl Harper and Ivaturi Shivram
Player of the match: Anil Kumble (Bangalore)

- Royal Challengers Bangalore won the toss and elected to bat.

22 May 2008
20:00 (D/N)
Scorecard

(H) Delhi Daredevils	v	Kolkata Knight Riders

Match abandoned without a ball bowled
Feroz Shah Kotla, Delhi
Umpires: Arani Jayaprakash and Brian Jerling

- Match abandoned due to rain.
- Kings XI Punjab qualified for playoffs, and Kolkata Knight Riders were eliminated as a result of this match.

23 May 2008
20:00 (D/N)
Scorecard

Deccan Chargers; 175/4 (20 overs)	v	Kings XI Punjab (H); 178/4 (19.3 overs)
Rohit Sharma 50 (27); Ramesh Powar 1/20 (4 overs)		Shaun Marsh 60 (46); Pragyan Ojha 2/30 (4 overs)

Punjab won by 6 wickets
Punjab Cricket Association Stadium, Mohali
Umpires: Asad Rauf and Steve Davis
Player of the match: Shaun Marsh (Punjab)

- Kings XI Punjab won the toss and elected to field.

24 May 2008
16:00 (D/N)
Scorecard

Rajasthan Royals; 211/5 (20 overs)	v	Chennai Super Kings (H); 201/7 (20 overs)
Graeme Smith 91 (51); Albie Morkel 2/35 (4 overs)		Albie Morkel 71 (40); Sohail Tanvir 3/33 (4 overs)

Rajasthan won by 10 runs
M. A. Chidambaram Stadium, Chennai
Umpires: Daryl Harper and Suresh Shastri
Player of the match: Albie Morkel (Chennai)

- Rajasthan Royals won the toss and elected to bat.

24 May 2008
20:00 (D/N)
Scorecard

Mumbai Indians; 176/8 (20 overs)	v	Delhi Daredevils (H); 179/5 (19.5 overs)
Sanath Jayasuriya 66 (42); Yo Mahesh 4/36 (4 overs)		Dinesh Karthik 56* (32); Dwayne Smith 2/22 (3 overs)

Delhi won by 5 wickets
Feroz Shah Kotla, Delhi
Umpires: Billy Bowden and Krishna Hariharan
Player of the match: Dinesh Karthik (Delhi)

- Delhi Daredevils won the toss and elected to field.

25 May 2008
16:00 (D/N)
Scorecard

(H) Deccan Chargers; 165 all out (20 overs)	v	Royal Challengers Bangalore; 171/5 (19 overs)
Herschelle Gibbs 47 (34); Vinay Kumar 3/27 (4 overs)		Misbah-ul-Haq 34 (28); Dwaraka Ravi Teja 1/19 (2 overs)

Bangalore won by 5 wickets
Rajiv Gandhi International Cricket Stadium, Hyderabad
Umpires: Asad Rauf and Rudi Koertzen
Player of the match: Vinay Kumar (Bangalore)

- Deccan Chargers won the toss and elected to bat.

25 May 2008
20:00 (D/N)
Scorecard

Kings XI Punjab; 174/6 (20 overs)	v	Kolkata Knight Riders (H); 175/7 (19.4 overs)
Kumar Sangakkara 64 (45); Umar Gul 4/23 (4 overs)		Sourav Ganguly 86* (53); VRV Singh 2/28 (4 overs)

Kolkata won by 3 wickets
Eden Gardens, Kolkata
Umpires: Steve Davis and Ivaturi Shivram
Player of the match: Umar Gul (Kolkata)

- Kings XI Punjab won the toss and elected to bat.

26 May 2008
20:00 (D/N)
Scorecard

Mumbai Indians; 145/7 (20 overs)	v	Rajasthan Royals (H); 146/5 (20 overs)
Sanath Jayasuriya 38 (37); Sohail Tanvir 4/14 (4 overs)		Niraj Patel 40* (29); Dilhara Fernando 2/27 (4 overs)

Rajasthan won by 5 wickets
Sawai Mansingh Stadium, Jaipur
Umpires: Billy Bowden and Krishna Hariharan
Player of the match: Sohail Tanvir (Rajasthan)

- Rajasthan Royals won the toss and elected to field.
- Delhi Daredevils qualified for playoffs as a result of this match.

27 May 2008
20:00 (D/N)
Scorecard

(H) Deccan Chargers; 147/8 (20 overs)	v	Chennai Super Kings; 148/3 (19.2 overs)
Venugopal Rao 46 (46); L Balaji 2/34 (4 overs)		Suresh Raina 54* (43); Sarvesh Kumar 1/38 (2 overs)

Chennai won by 7 wickets
Rajiv Gandhi International Cricket Stadium, Hyderabad
Umpires: Brian Jerling and Amiesh Saheba
Player of the match: Suresh Raina (Chennai)

- Deccan Chargers won the toss and elected to bat.
- Chennai Super Kings qualified for playoffs, and Mumbai Indians were eliminated as a result of this match.

28 May 2008
16:00 (D/N)
Scorecard

(H) Royal Challengers Bangalore; 122/9 (18 overs)	v	Mumbai Indians; 126/1 (16 overs)
Cameron White 26 (20); Dilhara Fernando 4/18 (4 overs)		Sanath Jayasuriya 54 (37); Dale Steyn 1/14 (4 overs)

Mumbai won by 9 wickets
M. Chinnaswamy Stadium, Bangalore
Umpires: Billy Bowden and Arani Jayaprakash
Player of the match: Dilhara Fernando (Mumbai)

- Mumbai Indians won the toss and elected to field.
- Rain reduced play to 18 overs per side.

28 May 2008
20:00 (D/N)
Scorecard

(H) Kings XI Punjab; 221/3 (20 overs)	v	Rajasthan Royals; 180/7 (20 overs)
Shaun Marsh 115 (69); Yusuf Pathan 1/24 (2 overs)		Niraj Patel 57 (39); Piyush Chawla 3/35 (4 overs)

Punjab won by 41 runs
Punjab Cricket Association Stadium, Mohali
Umpires: Steve Davis and Krishna Hariharan
Player of the match: Shaun Marsh (Punjab)

- Rajasthan Royals won the toss and elected to field.

== Playoffs ==
Semi-finals
30 May — Wankhede Stadium, Mumbai
1	Rajasthan Royals	192/9 (20 overs)
4	Delhi Daredevils	87 (16.1 overs)
31 May — Wankhede Stadium, Mumbai
2	Kings XI Punjab	112/8 (20 overs)
3	Chennai Super Kings	116/1 (14.5 overs)

Final
1 June — DY Patil Stadium, Navi Mumbai
SF1W	Rajasthan Royals	164/7 (20 overs)
SF2W	Chennai Super Kings	163/5 (20 overs)

=== Semi-final 1 ===
30 May 2008
20:00 (D/N)
Scorecard

Rajasthan Royals; 192/9 (20 overs)	v	Delhi Daredevils; 87 (16.1 overs)
Shane Watson 52 (29); Farveez Maharoof 3/34 (4 overs)		Tillakaratne Dilshan 33 (22); Shane Watson 3/10 (3 overs)

Rajasthan won by 105 runs
Wankhede Stadium, Mumbai
Umpires: Billy Bowden and Rudi Koertzen
Player of the match: Shane Watson (Rajasthan)

- Delhi Daredevils won the toss and elected to field.

=== Semi-final 2 ===
31 May 2008
20:00 (D/N)
Scorecard

Kings XI Punjab; 112/8 (20 overs)	v	Chennai Super Kings; 116/1 (14.5 overs)
Ramesh Powar 28* (21); Manpreet Gony 2/14 (4 overs)		Suresh Raina 55* (34); Irfan Pathan 1/24 (4 overs)

Chennai won by 9 wickets
Wankhede Stadium, Mumbai
Umpires: Asad Rauf and Daryl Harper
Player of the match: Makhaya Ntini (Chennai)

- Kings XI Punjab won the toss and elected to bat.

=== Final ===
1 June 2008
20:15 (D/N)
Scorecard

Chennai Super Kings; 163/5 (20 overs)	v	Rajasthan Royals; 164/7 (20 overs)
Suresh Raina 43 (30); Yusuf Pathan 3/22 (4 overs)		Yusuf Pathan 56 (39); Albie Morkel 2/25 (4 overs)

Rajasthan won by 3 wickets
DY Patil Stadium, Navi Mumbai
Umpires: Billy Bowden and Rudi Koertzen
Player of the match: Yusuf Pathan (Rajasthan)

- Rajasthan Royals won the toss and elected to field.

== Statistics ==
=== Most runs ===
Player	Team	Mat	Inns	Runs	HS
Shaun Marsh	Kings XI Punjab	11	11	616	115
Gautam Gambhir	Delhi Daredevils	14	14	534	86
Sanath Jayasuriya	Mumbai Indians	14	14	514	114*
Shane Watson	Rajasthan Royals	15	15	472	76*
Graeme Smith	Rajasthan Royals	11	11	441	91

The tournament's leading scorer wore an orange cap when fielding.

Full Table on ESPNcricinfo

=== Most wickets ===
Player	Team	Mat	Wkts	BBI
Sohail Tanvir	Rajasthan Royals	11	22	6/14
Shane Warne	Rajasthan Royals	15	19	3/19
Sreesanth	Kings XI Punjab	15	19	3/29
Shane Watson	Rajasthan Royals	15	17	3/10
Piyush Chawla	Kings XI Punjab	15	17	3/25

The tournament's leading wicket taker wore a purple cap when fielding.

Full Table on ESPNcricinfo
Note: Economy rate acts as a tie-breaker if players are level for most wickets.

== Controversies ==
=== Cheerleaders ===
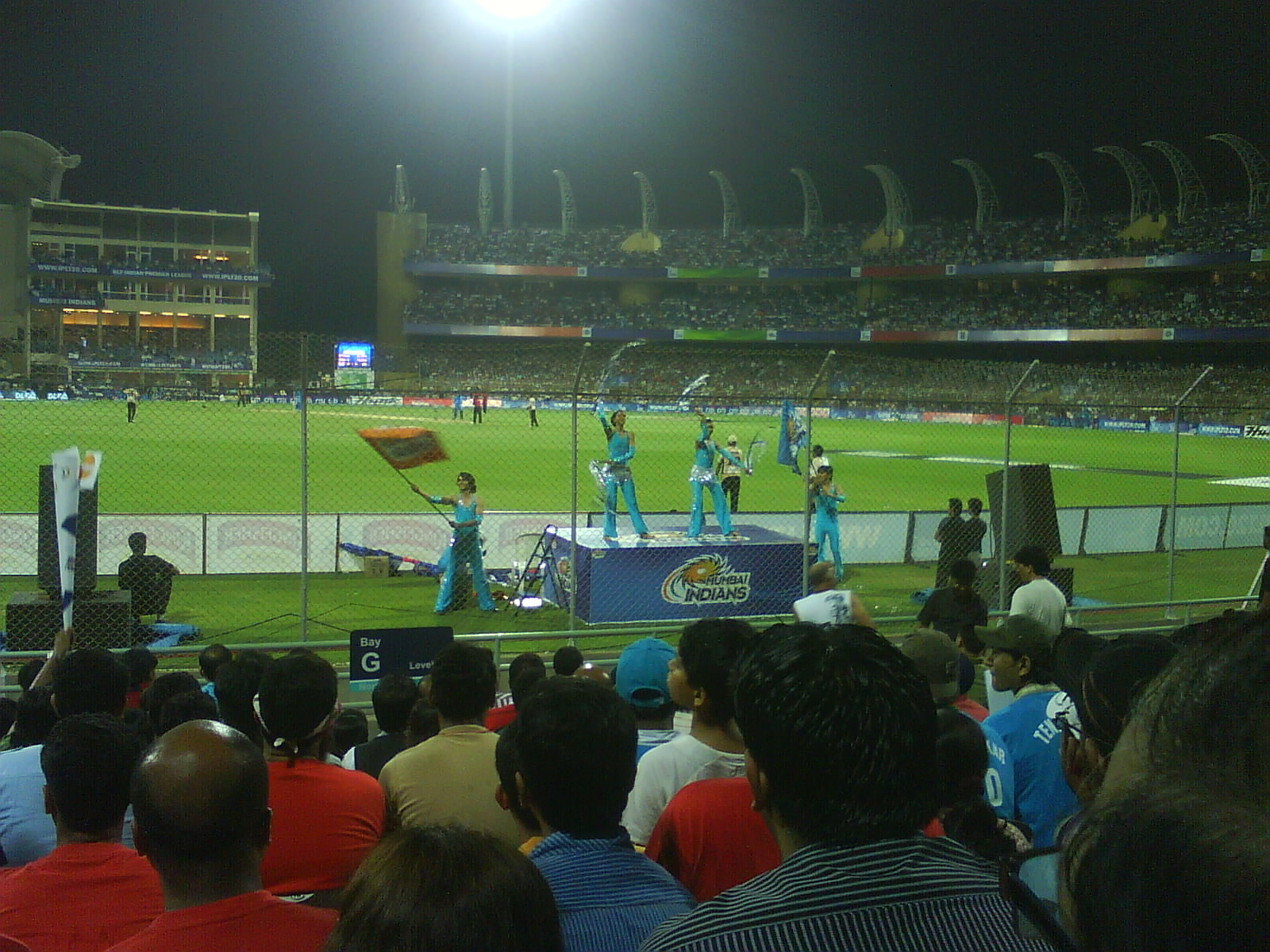
Cheerleeders during a match between Mumbai Indians and Deccan Chargers at the D Y Patil stadium.

The IPL received criticism from a few politicians and feminists for bringing in foreign cheerleaders, which was seen by many to not be in the traditional spirit of the game, as well as being against some Indian sensibilities. Two cheerleaders from London were asked to leave the ground at Mohali "because of the colour of their skin" by Wizcraft International Entertainment, which handled the team Kings XI Punjab. Ellesha Newton and Sherinne Anderson, both from London and of African ancestry were allegedly barred from entering the stadium by employees of Wizcraft International Entertainment on the pretext that "people don't like dark girls here". Both girls alleged that an employee referred to them with the racial slur "nigger".

The BCCI said a probe would be initiated by the IPL only if the two women officially complain to IPL commissioner Lalit Modi.

The BCCI and IPL officials later expressed surprised that the two cheerleaders did not complain about the alleged racist behaviour while they were in India and spoke about it only after they returned to London.

"We have not received any complaint from any cheerleaders that they were asked to leave by the Mohali-based Kings XI Punjab franchise recently because of the colour of their skin." BCCI joint secretary M. P. Pandove said in Mohali.

=== Sreesanth and Harbhajan Singh altercation ===
On 25 April 2008, following the Kings XI Punjab's victory over the Mumbai Indians at Mohali, Kings XI Punjab player Sreesanth was slapped under his eye by Harbhajan Singh, the stand-in captain of Mumbai Indians. The incident came to light as Sreesanth was caught by TV cameras sobbing inconsolably on the field before the presentation ceremony. Sreesanth had since downplayed the incident saying he had no complaints against Singh who was "like an elder brother" to him. Singh's team had lost their third consecutive match, and he apparently reacted violently to Sreesanth's approaching him and reportedly saying "hard luck". The footage of the slap has not yet been released for public viewing. The BCCI launched an investigation into the incident and decided to ban Singh for the remaining 11 matches of his season.
