= 2008 Rajasthan Royals season =

Franchise cricket team based in Jaipur, India

Rajasthan Royals
2008 season
- Coach: Shane Warne
- Captain: Shane Warne
- Ground(s): Sawai Mansingh Stadium, Jaipur
- IPL: Winners
- Most runs: Shane Watson (472)
- Most wickets: Sohail Tanvir (22)

Rajasthan Royals (RR) is a franchise cricket team based in Jaipur, India, which plays in the Indian Premier League (IPL). They were one of the eight teams that competed in the 2008 Indian Premier League. They were captained by Shane Warne. Rajasthan Royals finished winners in the IPL and qualified for the Champions League T20.

== Squad ==
On 27 February 2008, Shane Warne was named as captain and coach.

No.	Name	Age	Nationality	Batting style	Bowling style	Signing price
Batsmen
11	Mohammad Kaif	27	India	Right-handed	Right-arm off-break	US$ 675,000
15	Graeme Smith	27	South Africa	Left-handed	Right-arm off-break	US$475,000
29	Swapnil Asnodkar	24	India	Right-handed	Right-arm off-break	
46	Taruwar Kohli	19	India	Right-handed	Right-arm medium	
54	Anup Revandkar	21	India	Right-handed	Right-arm fast-medium	
75	Younis Khan	31	Pakistan	Right-handed	Right-arm leg-break	US$225,000
	Niraj Patel	26	India	Left-handed	Left-arm orthodox spin	
	Justin Langer	37	Australia	Left-handed	Right-arm medium	US$200,000
	Darren Lehmann	37	Australia	Left-handed	Left-arm orthodox spin	
	Aditya Angle	24	India	Right-handed	Right-arm off-break	
	Jaydev Shah	24	India	Left-handed	Right-arm off-break	
All-rounders
12	Ravindra Jadeja	19	India	Left-handed	Left-arm orthodox spin	
28	Yusuf Pathan	25	India	Right-handed	Right-arm leg-break	US$475,000
32	Dimitri Mascarenhas	30	England	Right-handed	Right-arm fast-medium	US$100,000
33	Shane Watson	27	Australia	Right-handed	Right-arm fast-medium	US$125,000
	Sumit Khatri	18	India	Left-handed	Right-arm off-break	
	Parag More	22	India	Right-handed	Right-arm off-break	
Wicket-keepers
05	Mahesh Rawat	21	India	Right-handed		
24	Kamran Akmal	26	Pakistan	Right-handed		US$150,000
Bowlers
01	Pankaj Singh	22	India	Right-handed	Right-arm fast-medium	
03	Munaf Patel	24	India	Right-handed	Right-arm fast-medium	US$275,000
07	Siddharth Trivedi	26	India	Right-handed	Right-arm medium	
08	Sohail Tanvir	23	Pakistan	Left-handed	Left-arm medium-fast	US$100,000
23	Shane Warne (Captain)	39	Australia	Right-handed	Right-arm leg-break	US$450,000
25	Dinesh Salunkhe	28	India	Right-handed	Right-arm leg-break	
	Morne Morkel	23	South Africa	Left-handed	Right-arm fast	US$60,000

== Indian Premier League ==
=== Standings ===
Rajasthan Royals finished first in the league stage of IPL 2008.

Pos	Team	Pld	W	L	NR	Pts	NRR
1	Rajasthan Royals (C)	14	11	3	0	22	0.632
2	Kings XI Punjab	14	10	4	0	20	0.509
3	Chennai Super Kings (R)	14	8	6	0	16	−0.192
4	Delhi Daredevils	14	7	6	1	15	0.342
5	Mumbai Indians	14	7	7	0	14	0.570
6	Kolkata Knight Riders	14	6	7	1	13	−0.147
7	Royal Challengers Bangalore	14	4	10	0	8	−1.160
8	Deccan Chargers	14	2	12	0	4	−0.467

Source: ESPNcricinfo

(C) = Eventual champion; (R) = Runner-up.

=== Match log ===
No.	Date	Opponent	Venue	Result	Man of the match	Scorecard
1	19 April 2008	Delhi Daredevils	Delhi	Lost by 9 wickets		Scorecard
2	21 April 2008	Kings XI Punjab	Jaipur	Won by 6 wickets	Shane Watson 76* (49)	Scorecard
3	24 April 2008	Deccan Chargers	Hyderabad	Won by 3 wickets	Yusuf Pathan 2/20 (2 overs) and 61 (28)	Scorecard
4	26 April 2008	Royal Challengers Bangalore	Bangalore	Won by 7 wickets	Shane Watson 2/20 (4 overs) and 61* (41)	Scorecard
5	1 May 2008	Kolkata Knight Riders	Jaipur	Won by 45 runs	Swapnil Asnodkar 60 (34)	Scorecard
6	4 May 2008	Chennai Super Kings	Jaipur	Won by 8 wickets	Sohail Tanvir 6/14 (4 overs)	Scorecard
7	7 May 2008	Mumbai Indians	Navi Mumbai	Lost by 7 wickets		Scorecard
8	9 May 2008	Deccan Chargers	Jaipur	Won by 8 wickets	Yusuf Pathan 68 (37)	Scorecard
9	11 May 2008	Delhi Daredevils	Jaipur	Won by 3 wickets	Shane Watson 2/21 (4 overs) and 74 (40)	Scorecard
10	17 May 2008	Royal Challengers Bangalore	Jaipur	Won by 65 runs	Graeme Smith 75* (49)	Scorecard
11	20 May 2008	Kolkata Knight Riders	Kolkata	Won by 6 wickets	Yusuf Pathan 1/14 (2 overs) and 48* (18)	Scorecard
12	24 May 2008	Chennai Super Kings	Chennai	Won by 10 runs	Albie Morkel 71 (40) and 2/35 (4 overs)	Scorecard
13	26 May 2008	Mumbai Indians	Jaipur	Won by 5 Wickets	Sohail Tanvir 4/14 (4 overs)	Scorecard
14	28 May 2008	Kings XI Punjab	Mohali	Lost by 41 runs		Scorecard
Semi-Final	30 May 2008	Delhi Daredevils	Mumbai	Won by 105 runs	Shane Watson 52 (29) and 3/10 (3 overs)	Scorecard
Final	1 June 2008	Chennai Super Kings	Navi Mumbai	Won by 3 wickets	Yusuf Pathan 56 (39) and 3/22 (4 overs)	Scorecard
Champions
