= 2008 Delhi Daredevils season =

Indian Premier League cricket team season

Delhi Daredevils
2008 season
- Coach: Greg Shipperd
- Captain: Virender Sehwag
- Ground(s): Feroz Shah Kotla, Delhi
- IPL: fourth
- Most runs: Gautam Gambhir (534)
- Most wickets: Yo Mahesh (16)

Delhi Daredevils are a franchise cricket team based in Delhi, India, which plays in the Indian Premier League (IPL). They were one of the eight teams that competed in the 2008 Indian Premier League. They were captained by Virender Sehwag. Delhi Daredevils finished fourth in the IPL and did not qualify for the Champions League T20.

== Squad ==
Virender Sehwag was the icon player and captain.

No.	Name	Age	Nationality	Batting style	Bowling style	Signing price
Batsmen
0	Shikhar Dhawan	22	India	Left-handed	Right-arm off-break	
5	Gautam Gambhir	26	India	Left-handed	Right-arm leg-break	US$ 725,000
9	Manoj Tiwary	22	India	Right-handed	Right-arm leg-break	US$675,000
44	Virender Sehwag	29	India	Right-handed	Right-arm off-break	US$833,750
55	Tillakaratne Dilshan	31	Sri Lanka	Right-handed	Right-arm off-break	US$250,000
	Mithun Manhas	28	India	Right-handed	Right-arm off-break	
	Mayank Tehlan	21	India	Right-handed	Right-arm off-break	
	Tejashwi Yadav	18	India	Right-handed	Right-arm off-break	
All-rounders
6	Shoaib Malik	26	Pakistan	Right-handed	Right-arm off-break	US$500,000
15	Daniel Vettori	29	New Zealand	Left-handed	Left arm orthodox spin	US$625,000
23	Rajat Bhatia	28	India	Right-handed	Right-arm medium	
28	Farveez Maharoof	23	Sri Lanka	Right-handed	Right-arm fast-medium	US$225,000
	Yogesh Nagar	18	India	Right-handed	Right-arm off-break	
Wicket-keepers
17	AB de Villiers	24	South Africa	Right-handed	Right-arm medium	US$300,000
46	Dinesh Karthik	22	India	Right-handed		US$525,000
Bowlers
11	Glenn McGrath	38	Australia	Right-handed	Right-arm medium-fast	US$350,000
21	Yo Mahesh	20	India	Right-handed	Right-arm medium-fast	
26	Mohammad Asif	25	Pakistan	Left-handed	Right-arm fast-medium	US$650,000
63	Brett Geeves	25	Australia	Right-handed	Right-arm fast-medium	US$50,000
99	Amit Mishra	25	India	Right-handed	Right-arm leg-break	
	Pradeep Sangwan	17	India	Right-handed	Left-arm fast-medium	

== Standings ==
Delhi Daredevils finished fourth in the league stage of IPL 2008.

Pos	Team	Pld	W	L	NR	Pts	NRR
1	Rajasthan Royals (C)	14	11	3	0	22	0.632
2	Kings XI Punjab	14	10	4	0	20	0.509
3	Chennai Super Kings (R)	14	8	6	0	16	−0.192
4	Delhi Daredevils	14	7	6	1	15	0.342
5	Mumbai Indians	14	7	7	0	14	0.570
6	Kolkata Knight Riders	14	6	7	1	13	−0.147
7	Royal Challengers Bangalore	14	4	10	0	8	−1.160
8	Deccan Chargers	14	2	12	0	4	−0.467

Source: ESPNcricinfo

(C) = Eventual champion; (R) = Runner-up.

== Match log ==
No	Date	Opponent	Venue	Result
1	19 April	Rajasthan Royals	Delhi	Won by 9 wickets, MoM – Farveez Maharoof 2/11 (4 overs)
2	22 April	Deccan Chargers	Hyderabad	Won by 9 wickets, MoM – Virender Sehwag 94* (41)
3	27 April	Kings XI Punjab	Mohali	Lost by 4 wickets
4	30 April	Royal Challengers Bangalore	Delhi	Won by 10 runs, MoM – Glenn McGrath 4/29 (4 overs)
5	2 May	Chennai Super Kings	Chennai	Won by 8 wickets, MoM – Virender Sehwag 1/21 (2 overs) and 71 (41)
6	4 May	Mumbai Indians	Navi Mumbai	Lost by 29 runs
7	8 May	Chennai Super Kings	Delhi	Lost by 4 wickets
8	11 May	Rajasthan Royals	Jaipur	Lost by 3 wickets
9	13 May	Kolkata Knight Riders	Kolkata	Lost by 23 runs
10	15 May	Deccan Chargers	Delhi	Won by 12 runs, MoM – Amit Mishra 5/17 (4 overs)
11	17 May	Kings XI Punjab	Delhi	Lost by 6 runs (D/L Method)
12	19 May	Royal Challengers Bangalore	Bangalore	Won by 5 wickets
13	22 May	Kolkata Knight Riders	Delhi	Match abandoned due to rain
14	24 May	Mumbai Indians	Delhi	Won by 5 wickets, MoM – Dinesh Karthik 56* (32)
15	30 May	Rajasthan Royals (semi-final #1)	Mumbai	Lost by 105 runs

== Statistics ==
Most runs
Player	Runs
Gautam Gambhir	534
Virender Sehwag	406
Shikhar Dhawan	340

Most wickets
Player	Wickets
Yo Mahesh	16
Farveez Maharoof	15
Glenn McGrath	12
