= 2008 Royal Challengers Bangalore season =

Indian Premier League cricket team season

Royal Challengers Bangalore
2008 season
- Coach: Venkatesh Prasad
- Captain: Rahul Dravid
- League stage: 7th
- Most runs: Rahul Dravid (371)
- Most wickets: Zaheer Khan (13)

Royal Challengers Bangalore is a franchise cricket team based in Bangalore, India, which plays in the Indian Premier League. They were one of the eight teams that competed in the 2008 Indian Premier League. They were captained by Rahul Dravid. The team finished seventh during the league stage and did not qualify for the play-offs.

== Squad ==
Rahul Dravid was the captain and icon player.

No.	Name	Age	Nationality	Batting style	Bowling style	Signing price
Batsmen
05	Virat Kohli	19	India	Right-handed	Right-arm medium	
06	Shivnarine Chanderpaul	33	Guyana	Left-handed	Right-arm leg-break	US$ 200,000
07	Wasim Jaffer	30	India	Right-handed	Right-arm off-break	US$ 150,000
14	J. Arunkumar	33	India	Right-handed	Right-arm off-break	
19	Rahul Dravid	35	India	Right-handed	Right-arm off-break	US$ 1,035,000
21	Ross Taylor	24	New Zealand	Right-handed	Right-arm off break	US$ 100,000
22	Misbah-ul-Haq	33	Pakistan	Right-handed	Right-arm leg break	US$ 125,000
27	Bharat Chipli	25	India	Right-handed	Right-arm medium	
All-rounders
3	Jacques Kallis	32	South Africa	Right-handed	Right-arm fast-medium	US$ 900,000
18	Cameron White	24	Australia	Right-handed	Right-arm leg-break	US$ 500,000
29	Ashley Noffke	30	Australia	Right-handed	Right-arm medium-fast	US$ 62,500
77	Balachandra Akhil	30	India	Right-handed	Right-arm medium-fast	
Wicket-keepers
9	Mark Boucher	31	South Africa	Right-handed		US$ 450,000
36	Shreevats Goswami	18	India	Left-handed		
66	Devraj Patil	23	India	Right-handed		
Bowlers
02	Dale Steyn	24	South Africa	Right-handed	Right-arm fast	US$ 325,000
08	Praveen Kumar	21	India	Right-handed	Right-arm medium-fast	
10	Anil Kumble	37	India	Right-handed	Right-arm leg-break googly	US$ 500,000
13	Nathan Bracken	30	Australia	Right-handed	Left-arm fast-medium	US$ 325,000
23	Vinay Kumar	24	India	Right-handed	Right-arm medium-fast	
24	Sunil Joshi	38	India	Left-handed	Left-arm orthodox spin	
34	Zaheer Khan	29	India	Right-handed	Left-arm medium-fast	US$ 450,000
41	Abdur Razzak	25	Bangladesh	Left-handed	Left-arm orthodox spin	US$ 120,000
	K. P. Appanna	19	India	Right-handed	Left-arm orthodox spin	
	Neravanda Aiyappa	28	India	Right-handed	Right-arm medium	

== Standings ==
Royal Challengers Bangalore finished seventh in the league stage of IPL 2008.

Pos	Team	Pld	W	L	NR	Pts	NRR
1	Rajasthan Royals (C)	14	11	3	0	22	0.632
2	Kings XI Punjab	14	10	4	0	20	0.509
3	Chennai Super Kings (R)	14	8	6	0	16	−0.192
4	Delhi Daredevils	14	7	6	1	15	0.342
5	Mumbai Indians	14	7	7	0	14	0.570
6	Kolkata Knight Riders	14	6	7	1	13	−0.147
7	Royal Challengers Bangalore	14	4	10	0	8	−1.160
8	Deccan Chargers	14	2	12	0	4	−0.467

Source: ESPNcricinfo

(C) = Eventual champion; (R) = Runner-up.

== Results ==
No.	Date	Opponent	Venue	Result	Scorecard
1	18 April	Kolkata Knight Riders	Bangalore	Lost by 140 runs	(Scorecard)
2	20 April	Mumbai Indians	Mumbai	Won by 5 wickets, MoM – Mark Boucher 39* (19)	(Scorecard)
3	26 April	Rajasthan Royals	Bangalore	Lost by 7 wickets	(Scorecard)
4	28 April	Chennai Super Kings	Bangalore	Lost by 13 runs	(Scorecard)
5	30 April	Delhi Daredevils	Delhi	Lost by 10 runs	(Scorecard)
6	3 May	Deccan Chargers	Bangalore	Won by 3 runs, MoM – Praveen Kumar 3/23 (4 overs)	(Scorecard)
7	5 May	Kings XI Punjab	Bangalore	Lost by 6 wickets	(Scorecard)
8	8 May	Kolkata Knight Riders	Kolkata	Lost by 5 runs	(Scorecard)
9	12 May	Kings XI Punjab	Mohali	Lost by 9 wickets	(Scorecard)
10	17 May	Rajasthan Royals	Jaipur	Lost by 65 runs	(Scorecard)
11	19 May	Delhi Daredevils	Bangalore	Lost by 5 wickets, MoM – Shreevats Goswami 52 (42)	(Scorecard)
12	21 May	Chennai Super Kings	Chennai	Won by 14 runs, MoM – Anil Kumble 3/14 (4 overs)	(Scorecard)
13	25 May	Deccan Chargers	Hyderabad	Won by 5 wickets, MoM – Vinay Kumar 3/27 (4 overs)	(Scorecard)
14	28 May	Mumbai Indians	Bangalore	Lost by 9 wickets	(Scorecard)
Overall record: 4–10. Failed to advance.
