= 2008 Kolkata Knight Riders season =

Indian Premier League cricket team

Kolkata Knight Riders
2008 season
- Coach: John Buchanan
- Captain: Sourav Ganguly
- Ground(s): Eden Gardens, Kolkata
- IPL: 6th
- Most runs: Sourav Ganguly (349)
- Most wickets: Umar Gul (12)

Kolkata Knight Riders (KKR) is a franchise cricket team based in Kolkata, India, which plays in the Indian Premier League (IPL). They were one of the eight teams that competed in the 2008 IPL edition. They were captained by Sourav Ganguly. Kolkata Knight Riders finished sixth in the IPL and did not qualify for the Champions League T20.

== Squad ==
On 11 March 2008, Sourav Ganguly, the team's icon player, was appointed as captain.

No.	Name	Age	Nationality	Batting style	Bowling style	Signing price
Batsmen
00	Salman Butt	23	Pakistan	Left-handed	Right-arm off-break	US$100,000
1	Sourav Ganguly	35	India	Left-handed	Right-arm medium	US$1,092,500
11	Aakash Chopra	30	India	Right-handed	Right-arm medium	
14	Ricky Ponting	33	Australia	Right-handed	Right-arm medium	US$400,000
17	Brad Hodge	33	Australia	Right-handed	Right-arm off-break	
	Cheteshwar Pujara	20	India	Right-handed	Right-arm off-break	
	Yashpal Singh	26	India	Right-handed	Right-arm medium	
	Debabrata Das	21	India	Right-handed	Right-arm off-break	
	Rohan Banerjee	19	India	Left-handed	Right-arm medium	
All-rounders
5	Mohammad Hafeez	27	Pakistan	Right-handed	Right-arm off-break	US$100,000
7	Laxmi Ratan Shukla	26	India	Right-handed	Right-arm medium	
8	David Hussey	30	Australia	Right-handed	Right-arm off-break	US$625,000
45	Chris Gayle	28	Jamaica	Left-handed	Right-arm off-break	US$800,000
	Iqbal Abdulla	18	India	Left-handed	Left-arm orthodox spin	
Wicket-keepers
6	Wriddhiman Saha	23	India	Right-handed		
13	Tatenda Taibu	24	Zimbabwe	Right-handed		US$125,000
42	Brendon McCullum	26	New Zealand	Right-handed		US$700,000
Bowlers
2	Ashok Dinda	24	India	Right-handed	Right-arm fast-medium	
14	Shoaib Akhtar	32	Pakistan	Right-handed	Right-arm fast	US$450,000
25	Murali Kartik	31	India	Left-handed	Left-arm orthodox spin	US$425,000
29	Ishant Sharma	19	India	Right-handed	Right-arm fast-medium	US$950,000
40	Ajantha Mendis	23	Sri Lanka	Right-handed	Right arm off-break	
55	Umar Gul	25	Pakistan	Right-handed	Right-arm fast-medium	US$150,000
68	Ajit Agarkar	30	India	Right-handed	Right-arm fast-medium	US$350,000
	Siddarth Kaul	17	India	Right-handed	Right-arm fast-medium	
	Ranadeb Bose	29	India	Right-handed	Right-arm fast-medium	
	Sourashish Lahiri	26	India	Right-handed	Left-arm orthodox spin	

== Indian Premier League ==
The team made a good start to the season by winning their first two matches against Royal Challengers Bangalore and Deccan Chargers. Opening batsman Brendon McCullum scored 158 runs in the first match. However, the team began to experience failures and lost the next four matches. The team managed to stage a comeback of sorts by winning the next three matches, helped by strong performances by Sourav Ganguly and Shoaib Akhtar. But their performance dipped again and they lost the next three matches. These included their match against Mumbai Indians, in which they were bowled out for 67 runs, the lowest score by a team in the IPL 2008 season. When their match against Delhi Daredevils was washed out due to rain, they lost any chance of making it to the semifinals. The Knight Riders ended their season on a winning note by defeating Kings XI Punjab on their home ground.

Financially, the Kolkata Knight Riders were easily the most successful franchise in the IPL, achieving a profit of ₹130 million (US$1.3 million) in the opening season itself.

=== Season standings ===
Kolkata Knight Riders finished sixth in the league stage of IPL 2008.

Pos	Team	Pld	W	L	NR	Pts	NRR
1	Rajasthan Royals (C)	14	11	3	0	22	0.632
2	Kings XI Punjab	14	10	4	0	20	0.509
3	Chennai Super Kings (R)	14	8	6	0	16	−0.192
4	Delhi Daredevils	14	7	6	1	15	0.342
5	Mumbai Indians	14	7	7	0	14	0.570
6	Kolkata Knight Riders	14	6	7	1	13	−0.147
7	Royal Challengers Bangalore	14	4	10	0	8	−1.160
8	Deccan Chargers	14	2	12	0	4	−0.467

Source: ESPNcricinfo

(C) = Eventual champion; (R) = Runner-up.

=== Match log ===
No.	2010	Opponent	Venue	Result	Scorecard
1	18 April	Royal Challengers Bangalore	Bangalore	Won by 140 runs, MoM- Brendon McCullum 158* (73)	Scorecard
2	20 April	Deccan Chargers	Kolkata	Won by 5 wickets, MoM- David Hussey 38* (43)	Scorecard
3	26 April	Chennai Super Kings	Chennai	Lost by 9 wickets	Scorecard
4	29 April	Mumbai Indians	Kolkata	Lost by 7 wickets	Scorecard
5	1 May	Rajasthan Royals	Jaipur	Lost by 45 runs	Scorecard
6	3 May	Kings XI Punjab	Mohali	Lost by 9 runs	Scorecard
7	8 May	Royal Challengers Bangalore	Kolkata	Won by 5 runs, MoM- Sourav Ganguly 20 (22) and 1/7 (3 overs)	Scorecard
8	11 May	Deccan Chargers	Hyderabad	Won by 23 runs, MoM- Sourav Ganguly 91 (57), 2/25 (4 overs) and 2 catches	Scorecard
9	13 May	Delhi Daredevils	Kolkata	Won by 23 runs, MoM- Shoaib Akhtar 4/11 (3 overs)	Scorecard
10	16 May	Mumbai Indians	Mumbai	Lost by 8 wickets	Scorecard
11	18 May	Chennai Super Kings	Kolkata	Lost by 3 runs (D/L)	Scorecard
12	20 May	Rajasthan Royals	Kolkata	Lost by 6 wickets	Scorecard
13	22 May	Delhi Daredevils	Delhi	Match abandoned due to rain	Scorecard
14	25 May	Kings XI Punjab	Kolkata	Won by 3 wickets, MoM - Umar Gul 24 (11) and 4/23 (4 overs)	Scorecard
Overall record: 6–7. Failed to advance.

== Tour of Australia ==
KKR played six T20 matches against Queensland during their 2008 tour of Australia. All matches were played in Allan Border Field, Brisbane. KKR won only one match, winning the second fixture by one wicket.
