= 2008 Kings XI Punjab season =

Indian Premier League cricket team season

Kings XI Punjab
2008 season
- Coach: Tom Moody
- Captain: Yuvraj Singh
- Ground(s): PCA Stadium, Mohali
- IPL: 3rd
- Most runs: Shaun Marsh (616)
- Most wickets: S Sreesanth (19)

Kings XI Punjab (KXIP) is a franchise cricket team based in Mohali, India, which plays in the Indian Premier League (IPL). They were one of the eight teams that competed in the 2008 Indian Premier League. They were captained by Yuvraj Singh. Kings XI Punjab finished third in the IPL and did not qualify for the Champions League T20.

== Squad ==
On 18 February 2008, Yuvraj Singh, the team's icon player, was appointed as captain.

No.	Name	Age	Nationality	Batting style	Bowling style	Signing price
Batsmen
5	Karan Goel	21	India	Left-handed	Right-arm off-break	
14	Shaun Marsh	24	Australia	Left-handed	Left-arm orthodox spin	
27	Mahela Jayawardene	30	Sri Lanka	Right-handed	Right-arm medium	US$ 475,000
37	Simon Katich	32	Australia	Left-handed	Left-arm unorthodox spin	US$ 200,000
38	Luke Pomersbach	23	Australia	Left-handed	Right-arm off-break	US$ 50,000
	Ramnaresh Sarwan	27	Guyana	Right-handed	Right-arm leg-break	US$ 225,000
	Tanmay Srivastava	18	India	Left-handed	Right-arm medium	
	Sunny Sohal	20	India	Right-handed	Right-arm leg-break	
	Sahil Kukreja	22	India	Left-handed	Right-arm off-break	
All-rounders
12	Yuvraj Singh	26	India	Left-handed	Left-arm orthodox spin	US$ 1,063,750
21	Wilkin Mota	26	India	Right-handed	Right-arm medium	
39	James Hopes	29	Australia	Right-handed	Right-arm medium-fast	US$ 300,000
63	Irfan Pathan	23	India	Left-handed	Left-arm fast-medium	US$ 925,000
	Rishi Dhawan	18	India	Right-handed	Right-arm medium-fast	
Wicket-keepers
11	Kumar Sangakkara	30	Sri Lanka	Left-handed		US$ 700,000
	Uday Kaul	20	India	Right-handed		
	Nitin Saini	19	India	Right-handed		
	Pankaj Dharmani	33	India	Right-handed		
Bowlers
36	S. Sreesanth	25	India	Right-handed	Right-arm fast-medium	US$ 625,000
44	Piyush Chawla	19	India	Left-handed	Right-arm leg-break	US$ 400,000
58	Brett Lee	31	Australia	Right-handed	Right-arm fast	US$ 900,000
	Ramesh Powar	29	India	Right-handed	Right-arm off-break	US$ 170,000
	Kyle Mills	29	New Zealand	Right-handed	Right-arm fast-medium	US$ 150,000
	VRV Singh	23	India	Right-handed	Right-arm fast-medium	
	Ajitesh Argal	19	India	Right-handed	Right-arm medium-fast	
	Gagandeep Singh	26	India	Right-handed	Right-arm medium-fast	

== Season standings ==
Kings XI Punjab finished second in the league stage of IPL 2008.

Pos	Team	Pld	W	L	NR	Pts	NRR
1	Rajasthan Royals (C)	14	11	3	0	22	0.632
2	Kings XI Punjab	14	10	4	0	20	0.509
3	Chennai Super Kings (R)	14	8	6	0	16	−0.192
4	Delhi Daredevils	14	7	6	1	15	0.342
5	Mumbai Indians	14	7	7	0	14	0.570
6	Kolkata Knight Riders	14	6	7	1	13	−0.147
7	Royal Challengers Bangalore	14	4	10	0	8	−1.160
8	Deccan Chargers	14	2	12	0	4	−0.467

Source: ESPNcricinfo

(C) = Eventual champion; (R) = Runner-up.

== Match log ==
No.	Date	Opponent	Venue	Result
1	19 April	Chennai Super Kings	Mohali	Lost by 33 runs
2	21 April	Rajasthan Royals	Jaipur	Lost by 6 wickets
3	25 April	Mumbai Indians	Mohali	Won by 66 runs, MoM – Kumar Sangakkara – 94 (56)
4	27 April	Delhi Daredevils	Mohali	Won by 4 wickets, MoM – Simon Katich – 75 (52)
5	1 May	Deccan Chargers	Hyderabad	Won by 7 wickets, MoM – Shaun Marsh – 84* (62)
6	3 May	Kolkata Knight Riders	Mohali	Won by 9 runs, MoM – Irfan Pathan – 24* (26) and 2/18 (4 overs)
7	5 May	Royal Challengers Bangalore	Bangalore	Won by 6 wickets, MoM – S. Sreesanth – 2/16 (4 overs)
8	10 May	Chennai Super Kings	Chennai	Lost by 18 runs
9	12 May	Royal Challengers Bangalore	Mohali	Won by 9 wickets, MoM – Shaun Marsh – 74* (51)
10	17 May	Delhi Daredevils	Delhi	Won by 6 runs (decided by D/L method), MoM – Mahela Jayawardene – 36* (17)
11	21 May	Mumbai Indians	Mumbai	Won by 1 run, MoM – Shaun Marsh – 81 (56)
12	23 May	Deccan Chargers	Mohali	Won by 6 wickets, MoM – Shaun Marsh – 60 (46)
13	25 May	Kolkata Knight Riders	Kolkata	Lost by 3 wickets
14	28 May	Rajasthan Royals	Mohali	Won by 41 runs, MoM – Shaun Marsh – 115 (69)
15	31 May	Chennai Super Kings (Semi Final #2)	Mumbai	Lost by 9 wickets
Overall record: 10–5. Advanced to the playoffs.
