= 2008 Mumbai Indians season =

Indian Premier League cricket team season

Mumbai Indians
2008 season
- Coach: Lalchand Rajput
- Captain: Sachin Tendulkar
- Ground(s): Wankhede Stadium, Mumbai (33,108)
- IPL: 5th
- Most runs: Sanath Jayasuriya (514)
- Most wickets: Ashish Nehra (12)

Mumbai Indians (MI) is a franchise cricket team based in Mumbai, India, which plays in the Indian Premier League (IPL). They were one of the eight teams that competed in the 2008 Indian Premier League. They were captained by Sachin Tendulkar.

== Squad ==
On 8 March 2008, Sachin Tendulkar, the team's icon player, was appointed as captain.

No.	Name	Age	Nationality	Batting style	Bowling style	Signing price
Batsmen
10	Sachin Tendulkar	34	India	Right-handed	Right-arm leg-break	US$ 1,121,250
15	Saurabh Tiwary	18	India	Left-handed	Right-arm off-break	
17	Dominic Thornely	29	Australia	Right-handed	Right-arm medium	US$ 25,000
27	Ajinkya Rahane	19	India	Right-handed	Right-arm medium	
77	Robin Uthappa	22	India	Right-handed	Right-arm medium	US$ 800,000
	Loots Bosman	31	South Africa	Right-handed	Right-arm medium	US$ 175,000
	Ashwell Prince	30	South Africa	Left-handed	Left-arm orthodox spin	US$ 175,000
	Manish Pandey	18	India	Right-handed	Right-arm off-break	
	Siddharth Chitnis	20	India	Right-handed	Right-arm off-break	
All-rounders
1	Sanath Jayasuriya	38	Sri Lanka	Left-handed	Left-arm orthodox spin	US$ 975,000
7	Shaun Pollock	34	South Africa	Right-handed	Right-arm medium-fast	US$ 550,000
25	Abhishek Nayar	24	India	Left-handed	Right-arm medium-fast	
47	Dwayne Bravo	24	(Trinidad and Tobago) Trinidad & Tobago	Right-handed	Right-arm medium-fast	
50	Dwayne Smith	25	Barbados	Right-handed	Right-arm medium	
	Gaurav Dhiman	21	India	Right-handed	Right-arm fast-medium	
	Musavir Khote	27	India	Right-handed	Right-arm medium	
	Ankeet Chavan	22	India	Left-handed	Left-arm orthodox spin	
	Swapnil Singh	17	India	Right-handed	Left-arm orthodox spin	
Wicket-keepers
12	Yogesh Takawale	23	India	Right-handed		
16	Pinal Shah	20	India	Right-handed		
34	Luke Ronchi	26	Australia	Right-handed		
Bowlers
3	Harbhajan Singh	27	India	Right-handed	Right-arm off-break	US$ 850,000
24	Rohan Raje	21	India	Right-handed	Right-arm fast medium	
26	Dilhara Fernando	28	Sri Lanka	Right-handed	Right-arm fast-medium	US$ 150,000
30	Dhawal Kulkarni	19	India	Right-handed	Right-arm medium	
64	Ashish Nehra	28	India	Right-handed	Left-arm fast-medium	
99	Lasith Malinga	24	Sri Lanka	Right-handed	Right-arm fast	US$ 350,000
	Andre Nel	30	South Africa	Right-handed	Right-arm fast-medium	
	Vikrant Yeligati	22	India	Right-handed	Right-arm off-break	
	Rajesh Pawar	28	India	Left-handed	Left-arm orthodox spin	

== Standings ==
Mumbai Indians finished fifth in the league stage of IPL 2008.

Pos	Team	Pld	W	L	NR	Pts	NRR
1	Rajasthan Royals (C)	14	11	3	0	22	0.632
2	Kings XI Punjab	14	10	4	0	20	0.509
3	Chennai Super Kings (R)	14	8	6	0	16	−0.192
4	Delhi Daredevils	14	7	6	1	15	0.342
5	Mumbai Indians	14	7	7	0	14	0.570
6	Kolkata Knight Riders	14	6	7	1	13	−0.147
7	Royal Challengers Bangalore	14	4	10	0	8	−1.160
8	Deccan Chargers	14	2	12	0	4	−0.467

Source: ESPNcricinfo

(C) = Eventual champion; (R) = Runner-up.

== Match log ==
No.	Date	Opponent	Venue	Result
1	20 April	Royal Challengers Bangalore	Mumbai	Lost by 5 wickets
2	23 April	Chennai Super Kings	Chennai	Lost by 6 runs
3	25 April	Kings XI Punjab	Mohali	Lost by 66 runs
4	27 April	Deccan Chargers	Navi Mumbai	Lost by 10 wickets
5	29 April	Kolkata Knight Riders	Kolkata	Won by 7 wickets, MoM – Sanath Jayasuriya – 3/14 (4 overs) and 18 (10)
6	4 May	Delhi Daredevils	Navi Mumbai	Won by 29 runs, MoM – Shaun Pollock – 33 (15) and 2/16 (4 overs)
7	7 May	Rajasthan Royals	Navi Mumbai	Won by 7 wickets, MoM – Ashish Nehra – 3/13 (3 overs)
8	14 May	Chennai Super Kings	Mumbai	Won by 9 wickets, MoM – Sanath Jayasuriya – 114* (48)
9	16 May	Kolkata Knight Riders	Mumbai	Won by 8 wickets, MoM – Shaun Pollock – 3/12 (4 overs)
10	18 May	Deccan Chargers	Hyderabad	Won by 25 runs, MoM – Dwayne Bravo – 30 (17) and 3/24 (4 overs)
11	21 May	Kings XI Punjab	Mumbai	Lost by 1 run
12	24 May	Delhi Daredevils	Delhi	Lost by 5 wickets
13	26 May	Rajasthan Royals	Jaipur	Lost by 5 wickets
14	28 May	Royal Challengers Bangalore	Bangalore	Won by 9 wickets, MoM – Dilhara Fernando – 4/18 (4 overs)
Overall record: 7–7. Failed to qualify for the semifinals.
