= Manpreet Gony =

Indian cricketer (born 1984)

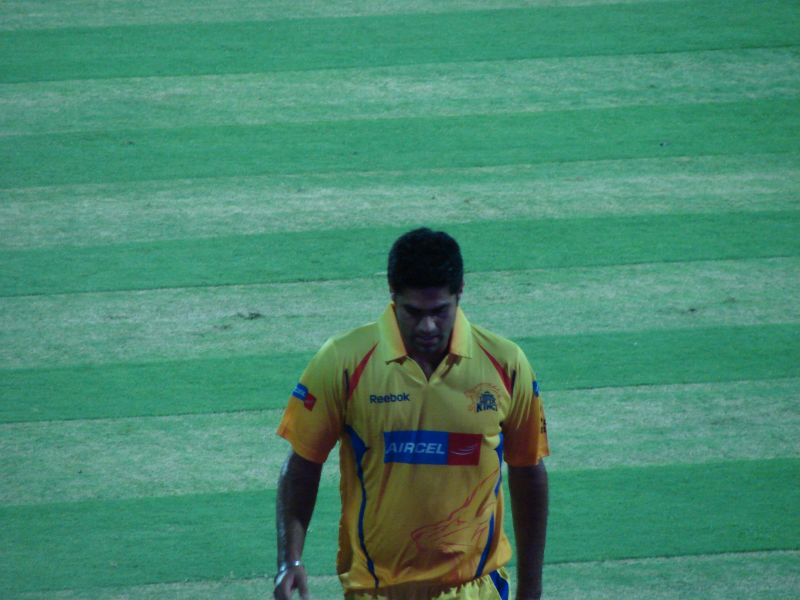

Personal information
- Full name: Manpreet Singh Gony
- Born: 4 January 1984 (age 42); Gurdaspur, Punjab, India
- Height: 1.93 m (6 ft 4 in)
- Batting: Right-handed
- Bowling: Right-arm medium
- Role: All rounder

International information
- National side: India
- ODI debut (cap 173): 25 June 2008 v Hong Kong
- Last ODI: 28 June 2008 v Bangladesh

Domestic team information
- Years: Team
- 2007/08–2019: Punjab
- 2008–2010: Chennai Super Kings
- 2011–2012: Deccan Chargers
- 2013: Kings XI Punjab
- 2017: Gujarat Lions
- 2019: Toronto Nationals
- 2020: Colombo Kings

Career statistics
Competition	ODI	FC	LA	T20
Matches	2	61	55	91
Runs scored	–	1,226	479	501
Batting average	–	17.02	19.16	13.54
100s/50s	–	0/5	0/0	0/0
Top score	–	69*	46*	42
Balls bowled	78	10,863	2,725	1,898
Wickets	2	196	77	97
Bowling average	38.00	28.77	27.87	25.17
5 wickets in innings	0	10	0	0
10 wickets in match	0	0	0	0
Best bowling	2/65	6/36	4/35	4/16
Catches/stumpings	0/–	13/–	12/–	17/–
Medal record
Men's Cricket
Representing India
ACC Asia Cup
Runner-up	2008 Pakistan
- Source: ESPNcricinfo, 23 June 2020

Manpreet Singh Gony (born 4 January 1984) is an Indian former cricketer. He was a right-arm medium pace bowler and right-hand middle order batsman. In June 2019, Gony announced his retirement from all forms of cricket, except for short-format leagues played overseas.

== Career ==
Manpreet Singh Gony made his debut for Punjab in the Ranji Trophy in the season 2007–08. He was later selected for the Chennai Super Kings in the Indian Premier League.

Gony has made his mark in the 2008 Indian Premier League matches. He played for the Chennai Super Kings. He was one of leading wicket takers in the Indian Premier League and also performed well with the bat, scoring crucial runs in the last overs. He was instrumental in the Chennai Super Kings victory against Delhi Daredevils. He took 17 wickets in 16 matches in the IPL tournament. His team, the Chennai Super Kings, were the runner's up of the IPL tournament. For the IPL season of 2011, Deccan Chargers picked him up for a sum of $290,000. Gony was later picked up by Kings XI Punjab for the season 6 of IPL. Gony got a chance to play his first match against KKR where he played a match winning innings of 42 off 18 balls with a strike rate of 233. He was presented with the man of the match for his powerful batting performance.

Gony was drafted into the Indian cricket team for the Tri-Nation Series in Bangladesh in place of Sreesanth who was ruled out with a side strain.

On 25 March 2012, Gony became the first player ever to bowl three maiden overs in a top-level Twenty20 match. Gony finished with figures of 4–3–5–3 in Punjab's Syed Mushtaq Ali Trophy quarter final win against Madhya Pradesh. He still holds the joint record for bowling the most maiden overs in a single T20(3).

He was the leading wicket-taker for Punjab in the 2017–18 Ranji Trophy, with 19 dismissals in five matches. In February 2017, he was bought by the Gujarat Lions team for the 2017 Indian Premier League for 60 lakhs.

In June 2019, he was selected to play for the Toronto Nationals franchise team in the 2019 Global T20 Canada tournament. In October 2020, he was drafted by the Colombo Kings for the inaugural edition of the Lanka Premier League.
