= G. A. Pratapkumar =

Indian cricketer and umpire (born 1956)

Personal information
- Born: 17 September 1956 (age 70); Venkatagiri, India

Umpiring information
- ODIs umpired: 2 (1998–2001)
- WODIs umpired: 7 (1997–2007)
- Source: ESPNcricinfo, 26 May 2014

G. A. Pratapkumar (born 17 September 1956) is a former Indian cricketer and umpire. He stood in two One Day Internationals between 1998 and 2001.

== See also ==
- List of One Day International cricket umpires
