= Joginder Sharma =

Indian cricketer and police officer

Personal information
- Born: 23 October 1983 (age 43); Rohtak, Haryana, India
- Batting: Right-handed
- Bowling: Right arm fast-medium
- Role: All-rounder

International information
- National side: India (2004–2007)
- ODI debut (cap 155): 23 December 2004 v Bangladesh
- Last ODI: 24 January 2007 v West Indies
- ODI shirt no.: 23
- T20I debut (cap 6): 19 September 2007 v England
- Last T20I: 24 September 2007 v Pakistan
- T20I shirt no.: 23

Domestic team information
- Years: Team
- 2002/03–2016/17: Haryana
- 2008–2012: Chennai Super Kings

Career statistics
Competition	ODI	T20I	FC	LA
Matches	4	4	77	80
Runs scored	35	–	2804	1040
Batting average	35.00	–	24.81	18.24
100s/50s	0/0	–/–	5/10	0/0
Top score	29*	–	139	87
Balls bowled	150	87	14,140	3577
Wickets	1	4	297	115
Bowling average	115.00	34.50	21.09	23.88
5 wickets in innings	0	0	14	0
10 wickets in match	0	0	5	0
Best bowling	1/28	2/20	8/24	4/13
Catches/stumpings	3/–	2/–	4/–	9/–
Medal record
Men's Cricket
Representing India
ICC T20 World Cup
Winner	2007 South Africa
- Source: CricketArchive, 4 July 2023

DSP Joginder Sharma (born 23 October 1983) is an Indian police officer and former professional cricketer who currently serves as a DSP of police in the Haryana Police. He has made sporadic appearances for the Indian cricket team. He also played for Chennai Super Kings from 2008 to 2012. He was a member of the Indian team that won the 2007 inaugural ICC T20 World Cup, where in the final, he took the winning wicket of Misbah-ul-Haq. During his time with Chennai in the IPL, he was a part of the team that won the 2010 and 2011 tournaments.

== Style of play ==
A bowling all rounder, he played as a right-handed batsman and a right-arm medium-fast bowler and captained his state, Haryana.

== Domestic career ==
Sharma made his first-class debut for Haryana against Madhya Pradesh in the 2002/03 Ranji Trophy, hitting 81 before taking 11/84 to lead Haryana to a 103 run victory. He had made his debut in the limited over domestic arena the season before. Sharma finished his debut season with 24 wickets at 17.41 and 280 runs at 46.66 He followed this with 148 runs at 68.51 and 23 wickets at 23.39 in 2003/04 Ranji season. He was selected for the North Zone team for the Duleep Trophy, and took 6/59 in a match against West Zone during the victorious campaign.

Sharma gained national attention in a match for India A against the national team at Bangalore, when he dismissed Rahul Dravid, V. V. S. Laxman and Yuvraj Singh. He also played for the Rest of India side, which defeated Mumbai in the Irani Trophy.

Having scored two successive centuries, and securing a 14/116 in the 2004/05 Ranji Trophy against Vidarbha, Sharma won his place in the Indian side for the Bangladesh tour. He had limited batting opportunities, scoring 34 in two brief knocks at the end of the innings without being dismissed, but his bowling was ineffective, taking 1/99, and was dropped after playing in that ODI series. He ended the Ranji Trophy with 36 wickets, the second highest at 15.47 and 472 runs at 52. In 2005/06, he topped the Duleep Trophy bowling averages.

Sharma performed strongly in the 2006/07 Indian domestic season to bring himself into contention for national selection. His batting for North Zone in the Duleep Trophy yielded 421 runs in three matches, and he was subsequently the leading wicket-taker in the Ranji Trophy, taking 39 wickets in seven matches, as well as two ten-wicket hauls and a hat-trick. Despite being unable to prevent Haryana from being relegated to the Plate division, he was recalled in January 2007 to the team at the expense of Irfan Pathan for the ODI series against the West Indies. He was selected for the second ODI in Cuttack, but after scoring 1 and failing to take a wicket, Pathan was immediately recalled and Sharma dropped. Sharma was not named in the Indian squad for the 2007 Cricket World Cup.

== International career ==
Sharma found a place for himself in the 2007 World Twenty20 in South Africa. He bowled the final over of the semi-final against Australia, with Michael Hussey facing and Australia needing 22 runs to win, taking two wickets as India won by 15 runs.

He also bowled the final over in the final against Pakistan with thirteen runs required and only one wicket in hand. His first ball went for a wide and the next was borderline but not called by the umpire. The third was a full toss which was pulled straight back over his head for six by Misbah-ul-Haq. Then he bowled a delivery outside off stump which Misbah attempted to scoop the ball over the fine leg fielder from the fourth ball but mistimed it and was caught by Sreesanth, giving India the win. The Haryana government announced a cash reward of ₹21 lakh (equivalent to ₹69 lakh or US$74,000 in 2026) and a job as Deputy Superintendent of Police (DSP) for Joginder Sharma in recognition of his contribution to the Indian victory.

== Post-playing career ==
Joginder Sharma joined the Haryana Police in October 2007, while still an active cricketer. He is, as of June 2020, a Deputy Superintendent of Police located in Pehowa in the Kurukshetra district of Haryana. Sharma retired from his cricketing career on 3 February 2023 having not played professional cricket since 2017.

In 2023, Haryana Police have registered a case against him and five others in connection with the suicide of a Hisar resident.

In other turn of events, he, while serving as a DSP in Haryana Police under sports quota, moved the Punjab and Haryana High Court after the state government excluded him from the list of officers considered for IPS promotion to the 2021 select list. He claims he joined the DSP post in 2007 and completed probation before most others on the list, suggesting unfair practices in his exclusion, to which the Punjab and Haryana high court have issued a notice to BJP-led Haryana Government.
