= Sohail Tanvir =

Pakistani cricketer

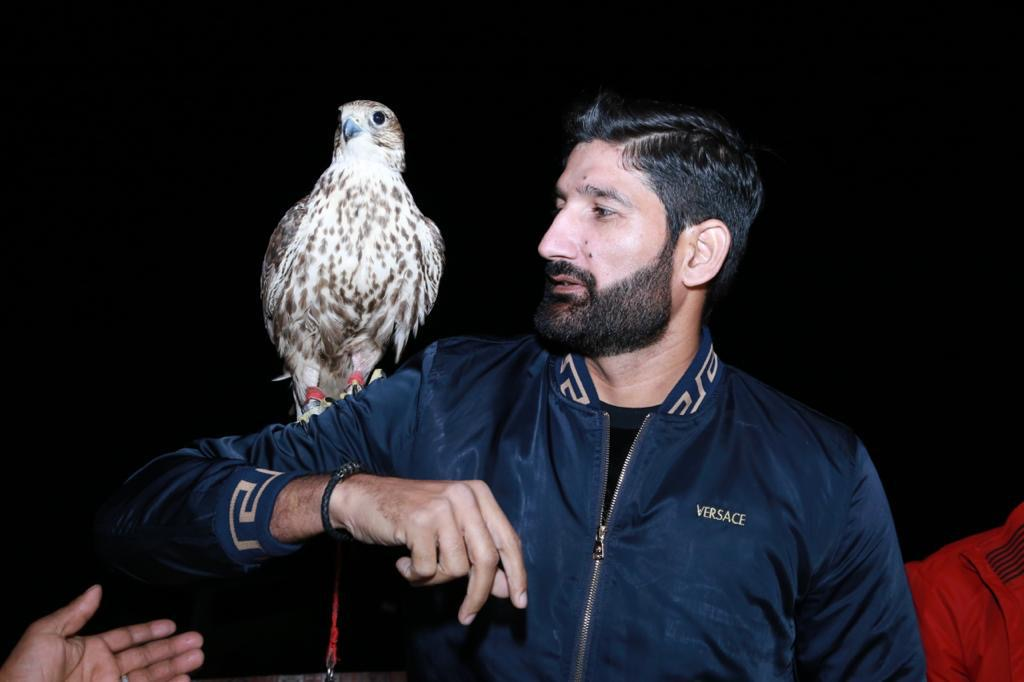
- Tanvir in the UAE

Personal information
- Born: 12 December 1984 (age 41); Rawalpindi, Punjab, Pakistan
- Height: 6 ft 3 in (191 cm)
- Batting: Left-handed
- Bowling: Left-arm medium-fast
- Role: Bowling All-Rounder

International information
- National side: Pakistan (2007–2017)
- Test debut (cap 188): 22 November 2007 v India
- Last Test: 30 November 2007 v India
- ODI debut (cap 158): 18 October 2007 v South Africa
- Last ODI: 17 December 2014 v New Zealand
- ODI shirt no.: 33
- T20I debut (cap 22): 14 September 2007 v India
- Last T20I: 1 April 2017 v West Indies

Domestic team information
- Years: Team
- 2004/05–2018/19: Rawalpindi (Note: Only clubs that Sohail has played for more than one season are included in this list.)
- 2004/05–2015: Rawalpindi Rams
- 2007/08–2008/09: Khan Research Laboratories
- 2007/08–2011/12: Federal Areas
- 2008–2009: Rajasthan Royals
- 2009/10–2014/15: Zarai Taraqiati Bank
- 2012–2014: Highveld Lions
- 2015–2020: St Kitts & Nevis Patriots
- 2016–2018: Baluchistan
- 2016–2018: Guyana Amazon Warriors
- 2017/18–2018/19: Sylhet Sixers (squad no. 33)
- 2018–2021: Multan Sultans (squad no. 33)
- 2018/19–2021/22: Quetta Gladiators (squad no. 33)
- 2019/20–2022/23: Northern
- 2024-2025: Chitwan Rhinos

Career statistics
| Competition | Test | ODI | T20I |
|---|---|---|---|
| Matches | 2 | 62 | 57 |
| Runs scored | 17 | 399 | 196 |
| Batting average | 5.66 | 13.75 | 11.52 |
| 100s/50s | 0/0 | 0/1 | 0/0 |
| Top score | 13 | 59 | 41 |
| Balls bowled | 504 | 2,949 | 1214 |
| Wickets | 5 | 71 | 54 |
| Bowling average | 63.20 | 36.14 | 26.92 |
| 5 wickets in innings | 0 | 1 | 0 |
| 10 wickets in match | 0 | 0 | 0 |
| Best bowling | 3/83 | 5/48 | 3/12 |
| Catches/stumpings | 2/– | 15/– | 7/– |
- Source: ESPNcricinfo, 18 September 2022

Sohail Tanvir (Urdu: سہیل تنویر; born 12 December 1984) is a Pakistani cricketer, who has gained considerable international repute for his unorthodox left arm bowling action and particularly for the success it has gained him in the Twenty20 format of the game. He was a member of the Pakistan team that won the 2009 ICC World Twenty20. Tanvir was the first 'purple cap' winner in the inaugural edition of the Indian Premier League and his best figures were 6 for 14 playing for the Rajasthan Royals. This bowling record lasted for over a decade in the IPL. His figures in the Caribbean Premier League for the Guyana Amazon Warriors against Barbados are some of the most impressive of all time (5 for 3 in the 2017 edition). Other notable mentions in the Caribbean Premier League include an 18-ball 50 playing for the Saint Lucia Zouks at the Daren Sammy Stadium including smashing three consecutive sixes against Kieron Pollard. Tanvir continues to play in franchise leagues across the globe as one of the most prolific bowling all-rounders in world cricket with economical bowling figures and an impressive strike rate. Sohail Tanvir represented the Multan Sultans and Quetta Gladiators in Pakistan Super League. In a 2020 interview, Tanvir described his 2007 Test debut wicket of Rahul Dravid in Delhi as the 'ball of his life' when the ball pitched outside leg stump and shattered 'the wall's off-stump in an unplayable manner.

== International career ==
=== Early career ===
Sohail Tanvir belongs to Rawalpindi, from Awan tribe. An allrounder, he is a hard-hitting left-handed batsman and an unorthodox left-arm medium-fast bowler who also bowls occasional left-arm orthodox spin. Was selected for Pakistan's squad for the inaugural World Twenty20 after Shoaib Akhtar was sent home. He made his Twenty20 debut in the tournament, and took six wickets in six matches, with best bowling figures of 3 for 31 in four overs against Australia. Though considered an allrounder, Tanvir did not get a chance to bat in the tournament until the final, where he made his first international runs, with a six off his first ball, aiding Pakistan back into the game.

After impressing in the ICC World Twenty20, he was selected to play in the ODI series against South Africa in October 2007. He was then selected for the tour of India, and took eight wickets in the ODI series. He also took part in the Test series that followed, making his debut in place of the injured Umar Gul. On debut at the Feroz Shah Kotla in Delhi, he took three wickets which included his first international Test cricket causality Sourav Ganguly and Rahul Dravid. In the Asia Cup, June 2008, Pakistan played their first game against Hong Kong at Karachi. In that match, Pakistan's top order struggled to get grips with Hong Kong bowlers before Sohail Tanvir set up a 100 run stand along with Fawad Alam for the 8th wicket. Sohail scored his maiden ODI 50 in that match. He scored 59 off just 55 balls which took Pakistan to a respectable score of 288. After that, in the match vs. Sri Lanka, Tanvir took his first 5 wickets haul. He ended at 5/48 in 10 overs. After the 2009 ICC World Twenty20

=== Triumph over adversity (2010) ===
Shortly after the World Twenty20, Tanvir was on a one-year break because of injuries. He missed the tour of New Zealand in November 2009, the controversial tour against Australia in January 2010. He also missed the chance to participate for Pakistan in the 2010 ICC World Twenty20 and the 2010 Asia Cup, and he missed the tour of England in August 2010. He recovered from injury in October 2010, and was selected to participate in the test series against South Africa under new captain Misbah-ul-Haq. The doctors however advised rest for Sohail Tanvir to help him recuperate fully from the new injury. He completely recovered from his knee injury by December and was selected for all three formats against New Zealand. He gave insights into his injury and stated at one point he couldn't even walk and that doctors thought he would really struggle to walk. However, he recovered really quickly after that as the surgery he had in Australia in January was a success. At the last minute of the team departing for the New Zealand tour, Tanvir was replaced because the selectors thought he was not fully fit. After missing the Twenty20 Internationals the selectors recalled Tanvir after he had proved his performance in domestic games coupled with poor performances from a depleted Pakistan bowling attack.

=== Return and World Cup selection (2011) ===
Despite being back in the team for the two-test series and the final Twenty20 Tanvir wasn't selected and not having played an international match in thirteen-months he was named in Pakistan's 15-man World Cup Squad he finally returned to the national team in the first ODI against New Zealand after Pakistan elected to bat Tanvir scored six-runs as Pakistan were bowled out for 124, however Tanvir also took one-wicket it would turn out to be Pakistan's only wicket of the match as New Zealand won by nine-wickets.

Tanvir was ruled out of World Cup 2011 due to failing to complete a full rehabilitation from surgery for a knee problem that had dogged him for two years. His career after his recovery continues to impress and he has made an impact in franchise cricket in tournaments from Qatar to the CPL and Canadian GT20 tournament.

== Domestic and franchise career ==
=== Indian Premier League career ===
On 11 March 2008, Tanvir was signed up in the second round of the Indian Premier League's players' auction by the Jaipur franchise, Rajasthan Royals, for $100,000.

Playing in his third match of tournament, on 4 May, Tanvir took a match-winning six wickets against the Chennai Super Kings at the Sawai Mansingh Stadium, Jaipur. He ended the tournament as the highest wicket-taker, with 22 wickets from 11 matches at an average of 12.09, an economy rate of 6.46 and a strike rate of 11.20, the best among bowlers with more than six wickets.

In the final of tournament, on 1 June at the Dr DY Patil Sports Academy in Mumbai, with Rajasthan chasing 164 to win, Tanvir added 21 runs along with captain Shane Warne. He hit the winning runs of the final ball of the innings, to see the Royals home. He was later presented with the "Purple Cap", an award for the leading wicket-taker of the tournament.

A statistical analysis conducted by ESPNcricinfo after the conclusion of the league stage of the tournament rated Tanvir as the most successful player. He was also rated as the second best value player of the tournament, having been signed on for $100,000.

=== T20 franchise career ===
In December 2008, Tanvir was signed by the Australian domestic side Southern Redbacks for the KFC Twenty20 Big Bash. In his first match against Western Australia he was pitted against fellow Pakistani fast bowler Umar Gul and although he was caught out first ball he took 1–15 with the ball for his side in a winning cause.

In February 2012, Tanvir featured in the inaugural Bangladesh Premier League tournament representing Sylhet Royals. Tanvir took 13 wickets and scored 78 runs in the tournament.

On 3 June 2018, he was selected to play for the Edmonton Royals in the players' draft for the inaugural edition of the Global T20 Canada tournament. In September 2018, he was named in Kabul's squad in the first edition of the Afghanistan Premier League tournament. The following month, he was named in the squad for the Sylhet Sixers team, following the draft for the 2018–19 Bangladesh Premier League. In July 2020, he was named in the St Kitts & Nevis Patriots squad for the 2020 Caribbean Premier League. Currently he is playing from the side of Chitwan Rhinos in Nepal premier league inaugural edition.

=== County cricket ===
He signed a one-year contract with Surrey County Cricket Club in July 2009 for £75,000. According to the ESPNcricinfo website the deal fell through when he was turned away from Heathrow airport on 31 July 2009, for having the wrong visa papers. On 5 June 2013 Tanvir signed for Hampshire for the remainder of the 2013 campaign. He agreed to play in all forms of competition. On 12 February 2015, Tanvir signed for Somerset to play in the 2015 NatWest T20 Blast.

=== Pakistan ===
In January 2017, he took the most wickets in the 2016–17 Regional One Day Cup, with a total of 15 dismissals. In April 2018, he was named in Baluchistan's squad for the 2018 Pakistan Cup. In March 2019, he was named in Punjab's squad for the 2019 Pakistan Cup.

In September 2019, he was named in Northern's squad for the 2019–20 Quaid-e-Azam Trophy tournament. In October 2019, he was the leading wicket-taker in the 2019–20 National T20 Cup, with fourteen dismissals in seven matches. In January 2021, he was named in Northern's squad for the 2020–21 Pakistan Cup.

== Post-retirement ==
=== Cricket administration ===
In January 2023, he became part of a selection committee for domestic age-group teams, headed by former international player Kamran Akmal, conducting trials for the selection of the U-13, U-16 and U-19 regional and district sides.
