= Deccan Chargers in 2008 =

Indian Premier League cricket team season

Deccan Chargers
2008 season
- Coach: Robin Singh
- Captain: VVS Laxman; Adam Gilchrist
- Ground(s): Rajiv Gandhi International Cricket Stadium, Hyderabad (Capacity: 55,000)
- IPL: Group Stage
- Most runs: Adam Gilchrist (436)
- Most wickets: R. P. Singh (15)
- Most catches: Rohit Sharma (8)
- Most wicket-keeping dismissals: Adam Gilchrist (7)

The Deccan Chargers (DC) were a franchise cricket team based in Hyderabad, India, that competed in the Indian Premier League (IPL), a professional Twenty20 cricket (T20) league in India. They were one of the eight teams that competed in the inaugural 2008 Indian Premier League. The team was captained by V. V. S. Laxman and coached by Robin Singh.

Despite being one of the favourites to win the inaugural IPL, they finished at the bottom of the table, winning only two games out of fourteen.

After the 2008 season, the team management sacked the entire administration associated with the tournament in that year. The captain and coach were also replaced.

== Background ==
The Deccan Chargers were one of the most expensive teams of the Indian Premier League and were considered to be one of the stronger teams.

== Squad ==
- Players with international caps are listed in **bold**.

Name	Nationality	Birth date	Batting style	Bowling style	Notes
Batsmen
**Herschelle Gibbs**	South Africa	23 February 1974 (aged 34)	Right-handed	Right-arm medium fast	
Doddapaneni Kalyankrishna	India		Right-handed		
**V. V. S. Laxman**	India	1 November 1974 (aged 33)	Right-handed	Right-arm off spin	Captain
Venugopal Rao	India		Right-handed		
**Rohit Sharma**	India	30 April 1987 (aged 20)	Right-handed	Right-arm off break	
Dwaraka Ravi Teja	India		Right-handed		
Arjun Yadav	India		Right-handed		
All-rounders
**Shahid Afridi**	Pakistan	1 March 1975 (aged 33)	Right-handed	Right-arm leg spin	
**Sanjay Bangar**	India		Right-handed		
**Scott Styris**	New Zealand		Right-handed		
**Andrew Symonds**	Australia		Right-handed		Withdrew mid-season
Wicket-keepers
Halhadar Das	India		Right-handed		
**Adam Gilchrist**	Australia	14 November 1971 (aged 36)	Left-handed	Right-arm off break	Vice-captain; Captained team after Laxman injury
Bowlers
Sarvesh Kumar	India	26 April 1989 (aged 18)	Right-handed	Right-arm medium fast	
**Pragyan Ojha**	India		Left-handed		
**Chamara Silva**	Sri Lanka		Right-handed		
**R. P. Singh**	India	6 December 1985 (aged 22)	Right-handed	Left-arm medium fast	
**Chaminda Vaas**	Sri Lanka		Left-handed		
Paidikalva Vijaykumar	India		Right-handed		
**Nuwan Zoysa**	Sri Lanka	13 May 1978 (aged 29)	Left-handed	Left-arm medium fast	

== Season overview ==
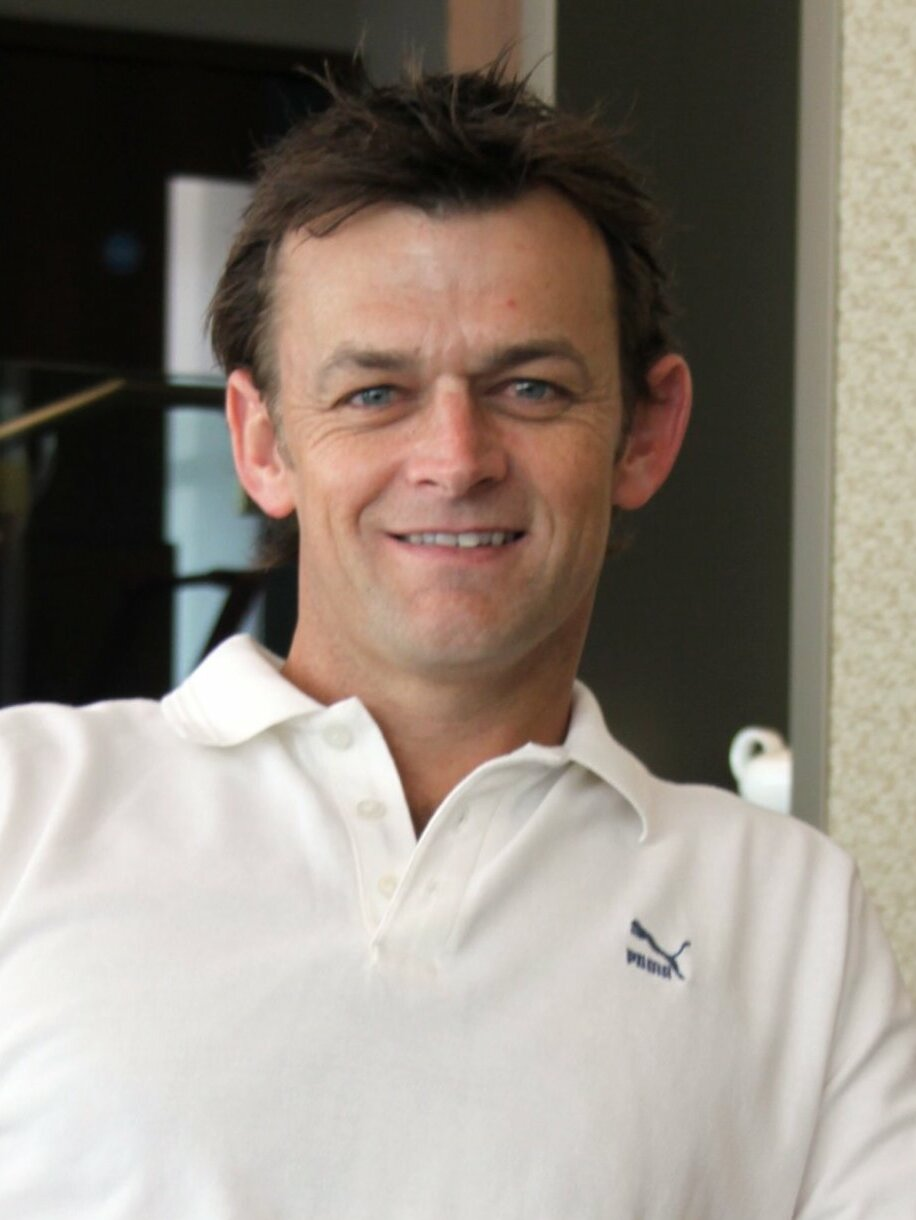
Adam Gilchrist scored a century against the Mumbai Indians on 27 April

On 20 April, the Deccan Chargers started their IPL campaign with a five wicket loss against the Kolkata Knight Riders.

On 22 April, the Chargers suffered a defeat at the hands of the Delhi Daredevils.

On 24 April, the Deccan Chargers lost their match against the Rajasthan Royals, despite Andrew Symonds scoring a century.

On 27 April, the Deccan Chargers recorded their first win, with a 10 wicket victory over the Mumbai Indians. Adam Gilchrist, who scored a century, was awarded player of the match.

On May 1, Andrew Symonds, who was one of the most expensive players in the auction, withdrew from the rest of the season because of international duty. On the same day, the Chargers lost to Kings XI Punjab by 7 wickets. The Kings XI won the toss and decided to bowl, restricting DC to 164 runs. Rohit Sharma and VVS Laxman played significant innings. The Kings XI chased the total with 7 wickets to spare.

On May 6, the DC secured their second win when they defeated the Chennai Super Kings by 7 wickets. DC won the toss and elected to bowl, restricting CSK to 144 runs. Gilchrist was awarded player of the match.

On May 13, it was announced that VVS Laxman would not play the rest of the matches due to an injury, and Adam Gilchrist would take over the captaincy.

In their last match of the season on 27 May, the DC lost to the Chennai Super Kings by 7 wickets.

The team finished last on the points table with two wins, and failed to qualify for the playoffs.
