= Sawai Mansingh Stadium =

International cricket stadium in India

Coordinates: 26°53′38.51″N 75°48′11.61″E

- SMS
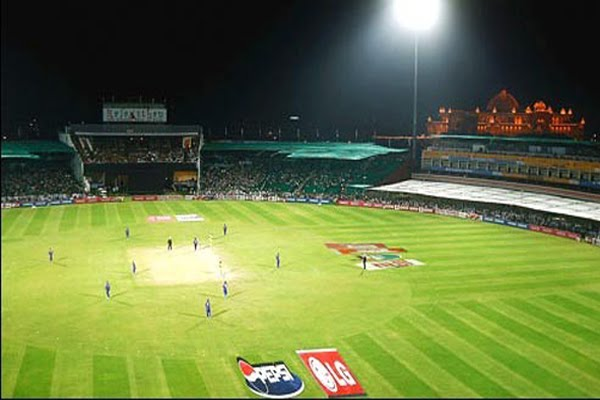
- Sawai Mansingh Stadium during IPL 2013
- Interactive map of Sawai Mansingh Stadium
- Address: Janpath, Lalkothi, Jaipur, Rajasthan, India
- Location: Jaipur, Rajasthan
- Owner: Government of Rajasthan
- Operator: Rajasthan Cricket Association
- Seating type: Stadium seating
- Capacity: 30,000
- Surface: Grass

Ground information
- Country: India
- Establishment: 1969 (57 years ago)
- Tenants: Indian Cricket Team; Rajasthan cricket team Rajasthan Royals (2008-15 & 2018–present)
- End names
- Van Vihar Colony End; Garh Ganesh Temple End

International information
- Only men's Test: 21 February 1987: India v Pakistan
- First men's ODI: 2 October 1983: India v Pakistan
- Last men's ODI: 16 October 2013: India v Australia
- Only men's T20I: 17 November 2021: India v New Zealand
- First women's ODI: 25 January 1984: India v Australia
- Last women's ODI: 21 December 2006: India v Sri Lanka
- As of 17 November 2021; Source: ESPNcricinfo

The Sawai Mansingh Stadium, popularly known as SMS Stadium, is a cricket stadium in Jaipur, Rajasthan, India. It was built in 1969 during the reign of Sawai Man Singh II, the last ruling Maharaja of the state of Jaipur. The stadium is owned by the Government of Rajasthan and operated by RCA, having a seating capacity of about 30,000 spectators. The stadium is the home ground of Rajasthan Royals, a team in the Indian Premier League.

== History ==
The Sawai Mansingh Stadium has hosted a solitary Test match, between India and Pakistan, starting in February 1987, when Pakistan President General Zia-ul-Haq crossed the border to watch the second day's play as part of his "Cricket for Peace" initiative.

The Test was notable for Younis Ahmed's return to the Test fray after an absence of over 17 years and also for Sunil Gavaskar's dismissal to the first ball of the Test match. Gavaskar's dismissal made him the first batsman to be dismissed three times on the first ball, a feat unmatched until Bangladesh's Hannan Sarker was dismissed on the first ball for a third time in 2004.

The game sputtered to a draw after the third day's play was abandoned following heavy rain and a controversy over the alleged deposition of sawdust on the wicket which Pakistan objected to.

The stadium's ODI debut had kicked off with a contest between the same two sides on 2 October 1983. Fresh from their World Cup triumph, the Indians comfortably won by four wickets, sporting the same XI that won the World Cup final.

The ground has also hosted two World Cup matches in 1987 and 1996 respectively, the West Indians losing to England in the former and beating Australia in the latter. The last ODI played on the ground is between India and Australia in October 2013 which they won comfortably by just losing one wicket chasing 362 in just 43.3 overs.

The highest individual score by any batsman on this ground in ODIs is 183 (not out) by Mahendra Singh Dhoni.

This is also the venue in which Virat Kohli made the fastest 100 for India in ODIs as India chase total of 359 against Australia which was second highest successful chase in ODIs, after the Johannesburg epic between Australia and South Africa.

== Re-development ==
In 2006, the stadium underwent a major renovation at a cost of ₹400 crore. A world-class cricket academy was built for ₹7 crore, which has 28 appointed rooms, a gym, a restaurant, 2 conference halls and a swimming pool.

New facilities:

- Media rooms
- Galleries
- 2 new blocks
- Capacity

== Matches ==
The first ODI, played at Sawai Mansingh stadium, kicked off with a contest between India and Pakistan in 1983, in which, India won by four wickets. The 1987 Test between India and Pakistan proved to be an instrument of peace, when Pakistan President General Zia-ul-Haq came over to witness the second day's play as part of his "Cricket for Peace" initiative.

The game, which saw Sunil Gavaskar being dismissed to the first ball of a Test match for the third time in his career, ended in a draw amid a controversy over the alleged deposition of sawdust on the wicket that Pakistan objected.

Sawai Mansingh Stadium has hosted IPL matches for Rajasthan Royals its local team and who won first season.

In a match at Sawai Mansingh Stadium in 2008, Sohail Tanvir became the first player in IPL history to take a 6 wicket haul while playing for Rajasthan Royals v Chennai Super Kings.

Royals have been deprived of their home advantage because of the inability of the Rajasthan Cricket Association to acquire requisite state government clearances.

== Ground records ==
- The highest ODI total at this ground is 362–1 by India against Australia in 2013–14.
- The lowest ODI total at this ground is 125 by England against India.
- The highest individual score by any batsman on this ground in ODI is 183 not out by Mahendra Singh Dhoni on 31 October 2005.
- This is also the ground where Sourav Ganguly and Sachin Tendulkar most successful opening pair for India in ODIs opened the innings for the first time.

== Latest progress ==
After announcement of shifting of some Indian Premier League matches in Maharashtra due to a severe drought situation in 2016, the IPL franchise Mumbai Indians opted for this stadium as its home ground as a substitution for Wankhede Stadium in Mumbai.

== Major tournaments ==
- 1987 & 1996 Cricket World Cup
- 2006 Women's Asia Cup
- 2006 ICC Champions Trophy

== List of Centuries ==
=== Key ===
- * denotes that the batsman was not out.
- Inns. denotes the number of the innings in the match.
- Balls denotes the number of balls faced in an innings.
- NR denotes that the number of balls was not recorded.
- Parentheses next to the player's score denotes his century number at Edgbaston.
- The column title Date refers to the date the match started.
- The column title Result refers to the player's team result

=== Test Centuries ===
No.	Score	Player	Team	Balls	Inns.	Opposing team	Date	Result
1	110	Mohammad Azharuddin	India	211	1	Pakistan	21 February 1987	Draw
2	125	Ravi Shastri	India	-	1	Pakistan	21 February 1987	Draw
3	114	Rameez Raja	Pakistan	279	2	India	21 February 1987	Draw

=== One Day Internationals ===
No.	Score	Player	Team	Balls	Inns.	Opposing team	Date	Result
1	104	Geoff Marsh	Australia	139	1	India	7 September 1986	Lost
2	111	David Boon	Australia	118	1	India	7 September 1986	Lost
3	102	Krishnamachari Srikkanth	India	104	2	Australia	7 September 1986	Won
4	100*	Vinod Kambli	India	149	1	England	18 January 1993	Lost
5	105	Sachin Tendulkar	India	134	1	West Indies	11 November 1994	Won
6	102	Ricky Ponting	Australia	112	1	West Indies	4 March 1996	Lost
7	106	Daryll Cullinan	South Africa	130	1	India	23 October 1996	Won
8	138*	Kumar Sangakkara	Sri Lanka	147	1	India	31 October 2005	Lost
9	183*	MS Dhoni	India	145	2	Sri Lanka	31 October 2005	Won
10	104*	Chris Gayle	West Indies	118	2	Bangladesh	11 October 2006	Won
11	123*	Shahriar Nafees	Bangladesh	161	1		Won	
12	133*	Chris Gayle	West Indies	135	2	South Africa	2 November 2006	Won
13	138*	Gautam Gambhir	India	116	2	New Zealand	1 December 2010	Won
14	141*	Rohit Sharma	India	123	2	Australia	16 October 2013	Won
15	100*	Virat Kohli	India	52	2	Australia	16 October 2013	Won

== See also ==
- Rajasthan State Sports Council
- Sawai Mansingh Indoor Stadium
- List of Test cricket grounds
- One-Test wonder
