= 2022 Tamil Nadu Premier League =

Cricket tournament

- Dates: 23 June – 31 July 2022
- Administrator: Tamil Nadu Cricket Association
- Cricket format: Twenty20
- Tournament format(s): Round-robin and play-offs
- Host: India
- Champions: Chepauk Super Gillies (4th title); Lyca Kovai Kings (1st title)
- Runners-up: None
- Participants: 8
- Matches: 32
- Player of the series: Sanjay Yadav (Nellai Royal Kings)
- Most runs: Sanjay Yadav (Nellai Royal Kings) (452)
- Most wickets: Abhishek Tanwar (Lyca Kovai Kings) (17)

The 2022 Tamil Nadu Premier League, also known as (TNPL-6) or, for sponsorship reasons, Shriram Capital TNPL was the sixth season of the Tamil Nadu Premier League (TNPL). It was taking place from 23 June to 31 July 2022.

Chepauk Super Gillies were the defending champions, having won their third title during the previous season. The final match between Chepauk Super Gillies and Lyca Kovai Kings was washed out due to rain and ended in a no result, and both teams were declared co-champions.

== Teams ==
There are eight franchises competing in league. The franchises are named after a district it is representing in the state.

– Home city
Team locations and match venues

Team	City/District	Captain	Coach	Owner
Chepauk Super Gillies	Chennai	Kaushik Gandhi	Hemang Badani	Dina Thanthi
Dindigul Dragons	Dindigul	Hari Nishaanth	Subramaniam Badrinath	Take Solutions Ltd
IDream Tiruppur Tamizhans	Tiruppur	Anirudha Srikkanth	Yo Mahesh	iDream Cinemas and iDream Properties
Lyca Kovai Kings	Coimbatore	Shahrukh Khan	Sriram Somayajula	Lyca Productions
Nellai Royal Kings	Tirunelveli	Baba Indrajith	Jayakumar G	Crown Forts Limited
Ruby Trichy Warriors	Tiruchirapalli	Rahil S Shah	Guruswamy	Ruby Builders
Salem Spartans	Salem	Murugan Ashwin	B. Ramprakash	Vivo Chennai south distributor Selvakumar M
Siechem Madurai Panthers	Madurai	N S Chaturved	Sriram Krishnamurthy	Pooja Damodaran

== Venues ==
A total of four venues were used in the 2022 season. The tournament started at Tirunelveli and final was held at SNR College Cricket Ground, Coimbatore.

- Indian Cement Company Ground, Tirunelveli
- NPR College Ground, Dindigul
- SNR College Cricket Ground, Coimbatore
- Salem Cricket Foundation Stadium, Salem

== Squads ==
Chepauk Super Gillies	Dindigul Dragons	IDream Tiruppur Tamizhans	Lyca Kovai Kings	Nellai Royal Kings	Ruby Trichy Warriors	Salem Spartans	Siechem Madurai Panthers
Kaushik Gandhi (c); Ramadoss Alexander; B Arun; Arun Kumar; S. Harish Kumar; Narayan Jagadeesan; Jaganath Sinivas; S Karthik; S Madhan Kumar; R Nilesh Subramanian; Prashid Akash; Radhakrishnan S; Dev Rahul; R. Sai Kishore; V Sai Prakash; Sandeep Warrier; Uthirasamy Sasidev; Rajagopal Sathish; Manimaran Siddharth; Sonu Yadav; S Sujay; S Vijay Kumar	C Hari Nishaanth (c); Advaith Sharma; S Arun; Ravichandran Ashwin; VP Diran; M Karthik Saran; S Kishan Kumar; Suresh Lokeshwar; K Mani Bharathi; Manoj Kumar; RS Mokit Hariharan; Karaparambil Monish; Karunakaran Mukunth; A. G. Pradeep; M Silambarasan; Rajhamany Srinivasan; Rangaraj Suthesh; S Swaminathan; Lakshminarayanan Vignesh; R Vimal Khumar; K Vishal Vaidhya; Rajendran Vivek	Srikkanth Anirudha (c); M. Mohammed; Subramanian Anand; S Aravind; Aswin Crist; Maan Bafna; D. T. Chandrasekar; P Francis Rokins; K Gowtham Thamarai; Abhishek Hegde; Dinesh Karthik; Alliraj Karuppusam; Selvam Suresh Kumar; S Manigandan; Mohan Prasath; Thangaraj Natarajan; G Parthasarathy; R Rajkumar; Lakshmi Sathiyannaarayan; Sharun Kumar; S Siddharth; Tushar Raheja	Shahrukh Khan (c); Mohan Abhinav; Ajith Ram; Govindhan Aravindh; Shijit Chandran; R Divakar; Ganga Sridhar Raju; Ishwar Suresh; Manish Ravi; U Mukilesh; T. Natarajan; M Raja; Ram Arvindh; Sai Sudharsan; N Selva Kumaran; C Shriram; J Suresh Kumar; Balu Surya; Abhishek Tanwar; Ashwin Venkataraman; Krishnamoorthy Vignesh; Valliappan Yudheeswaran	Baba Indrajith (c); G Ajitesh; Baba Aparajith; Arya Yohan Memon; V. Athisayaraj Davidson; Akash Dev Kumar; K Easwaran; NS Harish; Jitendra Kumar; Karthick Manikandan; Krish Jain; Pradosh Ranjan Paul; Rohan Raju; M Rooban Raj; Sanjay Yadav; M Sarath Kumar; G Satheesh Kumar; Sri Neranjan; Laxmesha Suryaprakash; H Trilok Nag; T Veeramani; Vikram Jangid; M Shajahan	Rahil Shah (c); Adithya Ganesh; Ajay K Krishna; Akash Sumra; Amit Sathvik; Antony Dhas; Atheeq Ur Rahman; R Ganesh; S Gokul Moorthi; G Hemanth Kumar; Jasper Benjamin; M Mathivannan; Muhammed Adnan Khan; N Niranjan; M Poiyamozhi; Nidhish Rajagopal; MS Sanjay; S Santosh; P Saravana Kumar; P Sugendhiran; Murali Vijay; ME Yazh Arun Mozhi	Murugan Ashwin (c); S Abishiek; Daryl Ferrario; S Boopalan; Dinesh Vedaguru; S Ganesh; M Ganesh Moorthi; H Gopinath; Jafar Jamal; Jeet Jain; R Kavin; G Kishoor; TD Lokesh Raj; Vijay Shankar; Ganeshan Periyaswamy; B Praanesh; Pranav Kumar; Rajendran Karthikeyan; Washington Sundar; Ravi Karthikeyan; R Rishi; Akshay Srinivasan	NS Chaturved (c); V Aaditya; Balchander Anirudh; Arun Karthik; Aushik Srinivas; M Ayush; K Deeban Lingesh; R Easwaran; V Gowtham; Vignesh Iyer; L Kiran Akash; Jagatheesan Kousik; R Mithun; K Rajkumar; B Rocky; P Saravana Kumar; S Senthil Nathan; R Silambarasan; Varun Chakravarthy; J Subramanyan; Sunny Sandhu; Thalaivan Sargunam

== Standings ==
=== Points table ===
Pos	Team	Pld	W	L	NR	Pts	NRR
1	Nellai Royal Kings (3rd)	7	6	1	0	12	1.312
2	Chepauk Super Gillies (C)	7	5	2	0	10	1.093
3	Siechem Madurai Panthers (4th)	7	5	2	0	10	0.368
4	Lyca Kovai Kings (C)	7	4	3	0	8	0.627
5	IDream Tiruppur Tamizhans	7	3	4	0	6	−0.362
6	Dindigul Dragons	7	2	5	0	4	−0.475
7	Ruby Trichy Warriors	7	2	5	0	4	−1.372
8	Salem Spartans	7	1	6	0	2	−1.192

Source: ESPNcricinfo

- Advanced to the qualifiers
- Advanced to the eliminator
- Eliminated from Tournament

== League stage ==
=== Matches ===
Match 1
23 June 2022
19:15 (N)
Scorecard

Nellai Royal Kings; 184/4 (20 overs)	v	Chepauk Super Gillies; 184/7 (20 overs)
Sanjay Yadav 87* (47); Manimaran Siddharth 1/30 (4 overs); Harish Kumar 1/30 (4 overs)		Kaushik Gandhi 64 (43); Sanjay Yadav 2/27 (4 overs)

Match tied (Nellai Royal Kings won the one-over eliminator)
Indian Cement Company Ground, Tirunelveli
Umpires: Krishnamachari Srinivasan and Rajesh Kannan
Player of the match: Sanjay Yadav (Nellai Royal Kings)

- Chepauk Super Gillies won the toss and elected to field.
- One-Over Eliminator: Nellai Royal Kings 10/1, Chepauk Super Gillies 9/1

Match 2
24 June 2022
19:15 (N)
Scorecard

Dindigul Dragons; 144/8 (20 overs)	v	Ruby Trichy Warriors; 147/2 (19 overs)
Lakshminarayanan Vignesh 32* (20); Ajay Krishna 2/9 (4 overs)		Nidhish Rajagopal 64* (48); Manoj Kumar 1/31 (4 overs)

Ruby Trichy Warriors won by 8 wickets
Indian Cement Company Ground, Tirunelveli
Umpires: Krishnamachari Srinivasan and Rajesh Kannan
Player of the match: Ajay Krishna (Ruby Trichy Warriors)

- Ruby Trichy Warriors won the toss and elected to field.

Match 3
25 June 2022
15:15 (D/N)
Scorecard

Chepauk Super Gillies; 135/8 (20 overs)	v	Siechem Madurai Panthers; 136/6 (18.1 overs)
Uthirasamy Sasidev 58 (43); L Kiran Akash 3/34 (4 overs)		Balchander Anirudh 58* (41); Ramadoss Alexander 3/20 (4 overs)

Siechem Madurai Panthers Won by 4 Wickets
Indian Cement Company Ground, Tirunelveli
Umpires: Madanagopal Kuppuraj and Mohammad Rafi
Player of the match: Balchander Anirudh (Siechem Madurai Panthers)

- Siechem Madurai Panthers won the toss and elected to field.

Match 4
25 June 2022
19:15 (N)
Scorecard

Salem Spartans; 149/7 (20 overs)	v	Nellai Royal Kings; 152/5 (17.4 overs)
Daryl Ferrario 60* (49); V. Athisayaraj Davidson 2/28 (4 overs)		G Ajitesh 48* (25); G Kishoor 2/40 (3 overs)

Nellai Royal Kings won by 5 wickets
Indian Cement Company Ground, Tirunelveli
Umpires: Janani N and Saidharshan Kumar
Player of the match: G Ajitesh (Nellai Royal Kings)

- Nellai Royal Kings won the toss and elected to field.

Match 5
26 June 2022
19:15 (N)
Scorecard

Lyca Kovai Kings; 188/8 (20 overs)	v	Dindigul Dragons; 190/5 (19.2 overs)
U Mukilesh 49 (25); Rajendran Vivek 3/35 (4 overs)		C Hari Nishaanth 60 (36); Shahrukh Khan 2/35 (4 overs)

Dindigul Dragons won by 5 wickets
Indian Cement Company Ground, Tirunelveli
Umpires: Madanagopal Kuppuraj and Janani N
Player of the match: C Hari Nishaanth (Dindigul Dragons)

- Dindigul Dragons won the toss and elected to field.

Match 6
27 June 2022
19:15 (N)
Scorecard

Ruby Trichy Warriors; 157/6 (20 overs)	v	IDream Tiruppur Tamizhans; 158/6 (18.5 overs)
Murali Vijay 34 (16); Aswin Crist 2/41 (4 overs)		Tushar Raheja 42* (26); P Saravana Kumar 3/44 (3.5 overs)

IDream Tiruppur Tamizhans won by 4 wickets
Indian Cement Company Ground, Tirunelveli
Umpires: Krishnamachari Srinivasan and Mohammad Rafi
Player of the match: M. Mohammed (IDream Tiruppur Tamizhans)

- IDream Tiruppur Tamizhans won the toss and elected to field.

Match 7
30 June 2022
15:15 (D/N)
Scorecard

Dindigul Dragons; 130/5 (12 overs)	v	Nellai Royal Kings; 133/2 (11 overs)
K Vishal Vaidhya 45 (21); Sri Neranjan 3/32 (3 overs)		Baba Aparajith 59* (30); Lakshminarayanan Vignesh 1/11 (2 overs)

Nellai Royal Kings won by 8 wickets (DLS method)
NPR College Ground, Dindigul
Umpires: Mohammad Rafi and Janani N
Player of the match: Sanjay Yadav (Nellai Royal Kings)

- Nellai Royal Kings won the toss and elected to field.
- The match was reduced to 12 overs per side due to rain.

Match 8
30 June 2022
19:15 (N)
Scorecard

Lyca Kovai Kings; 151 (20 overs)	v	Siechem Madurai Panthers; 154/8 (19.5 overs)
U Mukilesh 50 (38); R Silambarasan 3/28 (4 overs)		NS Chaturved 75 (45); Shahrukh Khan 4/14 (2.5 overs)

Siechem Madurai Panthers won by 2 wickets
NPR College Ground, Dindigul
Umpires: Krishnamachari Srinivasan and Rajesh Kannan
Player of the match: NS Chaturved (Siechem Madurai Panthers)

- Siechem Madurai Panthers won the toss and elected to field.

Match 9
4 July 2022
19:15 (N)
Scorecard

IDream Tiruppur Tamizhans; 145/8 (20 overs)	v	Dindigul Dragons; 148/1 (18.1 overs)
S Aravind 32 (23); M Silambarasan 3/21 (4 overs)		K Vishal Vaidhya 84* (57); M Mohammed 1/22 (3 overs)

Dindigul Dragons won by 9 wickets
NPR College Ground, Dindigul
Umpires: Rajesh Kannan and Saidharshan Kumar
Player of the match: K Vishal Vaidhya (Dindigul Dragons)

- Dindigul Dragons won the toss and elected to field.

Match 10
5 July 2022
19:15 (N)
Scorecard

Nellai Royal Kings; 209/3 (20 overs)	v	Siechem Madurai Panthers; 183/8 (20 overs)
Sanjay Yadav 70* (42); L Kiran Akash 2/44 (4 overs)		Arun Karthik 106 (57); NS Harish 3/30 (4 overs)

Nellai Royal Kings won by 26 runs
NPR College Ground, Dindigul
Umpires: Mohammad Rafi and Rakesh Raghavan
Player of the match: Sanjay Yadav (Nellai Royal Kings)

- Siechem Madurai Panthers won the toss and elected to field.

Match 11
6 July 2022
15:15 (D/N)
Scorecard

Salem Spartans; 146/9 (20 overs)	v	Lyca Kovai Kings; 149/2 (16.3 overs)
H Gopinath 41 (18); Balu Surya 3/14 (4 overs)		J. Suresh Kumar 64 (43); Murugan Ashwin 1/26 (4 overs)

Lyca Kovai Kings won by 8 wickets
NPR College Ground, Dindigul
Umpires: Mohammad Rafi and Rajesh Kannan
Player of the match: J. Suresh Kumar (Lyca Kovai Kings)

- Lyca Kovai Kings won the toss and elected to field.

Match 12
6 July 2022
19:15 (N)
Scorecard

Chepauk Super Gillies; 203/8 (20 overs)	v	Ruby Trichy Warriors; 159/6 (20 overs)
Radhakrishnan 81 (49); Ajay Krishna 3/33 (4 overs)		S Santosh 59 (38); Harish Kumar 3/25 (4 overs)

Chepauk Super Gillies won by 44 runs
NPR College Ground, Dindigul
Umpires: Rakesh Raghavan and Saidharshan Kumar
Player of the match: Radhakrishnan. S (Chepauk Super Gillies)

- Ruby Trichy Warriors won the toss and elected to field.

Match 13
7 July 2022
19:15 (N)
Scorecard

Dindigul Dragons; 122/9 (20 overs)	v	Siechem Madurai Panthers; 126/3 (15.3 overs)
RS Mokit Hariharan 43 (31); Sunny Sandhu 3/11 (4 overs)		Balchander Anirudh 51* (34); Lakshminarayanan Vignesh 1/23 (3 overs)

Siechem Madurai Panthers won by 7 wickets
NPR College Ground, Dindigul
Umpires: Rakesh Raghavan and Saidharshan Kumar
Player of the match: Balchander Anirudh (Siechem Madurai Panthers)

- Siechem Madurai Panthers won the toss and elected to field.

Match 14
10 July 2022
15:15 (D/N)
Scorecard

IDream Tiruppur Tamizhans; 117/8 (20 overs)	v	Nellai Royal Kings; 121/4 (15.3 overs)
Maan Bafna 37 (35); K Easwaran 3/11 (3 overs)		Baba Aparajith 63 (46); M Mohammed 2/29 (4 overs)

Nellai Royal Kings won by 6 wickets
SNR College Cricket Ground, Coimbatore
Umpires: K Raghuram and Krishnaraj Srinath
Player of the match: Baba Aparajith (Nellai Royal Kings)

- Nellai Royal Kings won the toss and elected to field.

Match 15
10 July 2022
19:15 (N)
Scorecard

Ruby Trichy Warriors; 135 (19.3 overs)	v	Lyca Kovai Kings; 138/5 (17 overs)
Murali Vijay 61 (35); Abhishek Tanwar 3/19 (4 overs)		Sai Sudharsan 27 (24); M. Mathivannan 1/21 (4 overs)

Lyca Kovai Kings won by 5 wickets
SNR College Cricket Ground, Coimbatore
Umpires: Jayaraman Madanagopal and MM Srinivasa Rangan
Player of the match: Abhishek Tanwar (Lyca Kovai Kings)

- Lyca Kovai Kings won the toss and elected to field.

Match 16
11 July 2022
19:15 (N)
Scorecard

Siechem Madurai Panthers; 165/7 (20 overs)	v	Salem Spartans; 126/9 (20 overs)
R Easwaran 41 (27); G Kishoor 3/39 (4 overs)		Pranav Kumar 25* (27); R Silambarasan 4/22 (4 overs)

Siechem Madurai Panthers won by 39 runs
SNR College Cricket Ground, Coimbatore
Umpires: Jayaraman Madanagopal and M Madhu
Player of the match: R Easwaran (Siechem Madurai Panthers)

- Salem Spartans won the toss and elected to field.

Match 17
12 July 2022
19:15 (N)
Scorecard

Lyca Kovai Kings; 170/7 (20 overs)	v	Chepauk Super Gillies; 171/5 (18.5 overs)
Shahrukh Khan 51* (28); R. Sai Kishore 2/25 (4 overs)		Narayan Jagadeesan 75 (51); Abhishek Tanwar 3/20 (3.5 overs)

Chepauk Super Gillies won by 5 wickets
SNR College Cricket Ground, Coimbatore
Umpires: Jayaraman Madanagopal and S. Nishaanth
Player of the match: R. Sai Kishore (Chepauk Super Gillies)

- Chepauk Super Gillies won the toss and elected to field.

Match 18
13 July 2022
19:15 (N)
Scorecard

IDream Tiruppur Tamizhans; 135/5 (20 overs)	v	Salem Spartans; 103 (19.2 overs)
Srikkanth Anirudha 32 (22); Daryl Ferrario 2/21 (4 overs)		Ravi Karthikeyan 36 (25); Mohan Prasath 3/11 (4 overs)

IDream Tiruppur Tamizhans won by 32 runs
SNR College Cricket Ground, Coimbatore
Umpires: MM Srinivasa Rangan and Sadashiv Iyer
Player of the match: S Aravind (IDream Tiruppur Tamizhans)

- Salem Spartans won the toss and elected to field.

Match 19
15 July 2022
19:15 (N)
Scorecard

Nellai Royal Kings; 236/2 (20 overs)	v	Ruby Trichy Warriors; 170/7 (20 overs)
Sanjay Yadav 103* (55); Rahil Shah 1/13 (1 over)		Murali Vijay 121 (66); Baba Aparajith 2/38 (4 overs)

Nellai Royal Kings won by 66 runs
SNR College Cricket Ground, Coimbatore
Umpires: GS Ananth Ramakrishnan and M Madhu
Player of the match: Sanjay Yadav (Nellai Royal Kings)

- Ruby Trichy Warriors won by the toss and elected to field.

Match 20
16 July 2022
15:15 (D/N)
Scorecard

IDream Tiruppur Tamizhans; 157/7 (20 overs)	v	Lyca Kovai Kings; 158/1 (15.2 overs)
Srikkanth Anirudha 39 (21); Balu Surya 3/19 (4 overs)		J. Suresh Kumar 83* (44); Lakshmi Sathiyannaarayan 1/36 (3 overs)

Lyca Kovai Kings won by 9 wickets
SNR College Cricket Ground, Coimbatore
Umpires: GS Ananth Ramakrishnan and Krishnaraj Srinath
Player of the match: J. Suresh Kumar (Lyca Kovai Kings)

- Lyca Kovai Kings won the toss and elected to field.

Match 21
16 July 2022
19:15 (N)
Scorecard

Dindigul Dragons; 138/5 (20 overs)	v	Chepauk Super Gillies; 139/5 (19.2 overs)
Rajendran Vivek 61* (38); Sonu Yadav 2/19 (4 overs)		Kaushik Gandhi 44 (38); Karaparambil Monish 2/23 (3.2 overs)

Chepauk Super Gillies won by 5 wickets
SNR College Cricket Ground, Coimbatore
Umpires: S Nishaanth and Sadashiv Iyer
Player of the match: Sonu Yadav (Chepauk Super Gillies)

- Chepauk Super Gillies won the toss and elected to field.

Match 22
19 July 2022
19:15 (N)
Scorecard

Salem Spartans; 113/6 (20 Overs)	v	Chepauk Super Gillies; 117/3 (14.5 overs)
H Gopinath 42 (45); Manimaran Siddharth 3/13 (4 Overs)		Kaushik Gandhi 46 (45); Ravi Karthikeyan 1/13 (2 overs)

Chepauk Super Gillies won by 7 wickets
Salem Cricket Foundation Stadium, Salem
Umpires: GS Ananth Ramakrishnan and M Madhu
Player of the match: Manimaran Siddharth (Chepauk Super Gillies)

- Chepauk Super Gillies won the toss and elected to field.

Match 23
20 July 2022
19:15 (N)
Scorecard

IDream Tiruppur Tamizhans; 129/7 (20 overs)	v	Siechem Madurai Panthers; 76 (17.2 overs)
Maan Bafna 40* (34); L Kiran Akash 3/18 (3 overs)		Sunny Sandhu 17 (15); Aswin Crist 3/13 (3 overs)

IDream Tiruppur Tamizhans won by 53 runs
Salem Cricket Foundation Stadium, Salem
Umpires: K Raghuram and MM Srinivasa Rangan
Player of the match: Maan Bafna (IDream Tiruppur Tamizhans)

- Siechem Madurai Panthers won the toss and elected to field.

Match 24
21 July 2022
19:15 (N)
Scorecard

Salem Spartans; 87 (19.5 overs)	v	Ruby Trichy Warriors; 26/2 (5 overs)
H Gopinath 24 (19); Rahil Shah 3/13 (3.5 overs)		Amit Sathwik 15* (17); TD Lakshay Raj 2/10 (2 overs)

Ruby Trichy Warriors Won by 4 runs (DLS method)
Salem Cricket Foundation Stadium, Salem
Umpires: Krishnaraj Srinath and S Nishaanth
Player of the match: Rahil Shah (Ruby Trichy Warriors)

- Ruby Trichy Warriors won the toss and elected to field.

Match 25
22 July 2022
19:15 (N)
Scorecard

Chepauk Super Gillies; 133/9 (20 overs)	v	IDream Tiruppur Tamizhans; 73 (19.3 overs)
Uthirasamy Sasidev 45* (29); Aswin Crist 3/30 (4 overs)		Srikkanth Anirudha 25 (26); R. Sai Kishore 4/2 (4 overs)

Chepauk Super Gillies won by 60 runs
Salem Cricket Foundation Stadium, Salem
Umpires: Sadashiv Iyer and Krishnaraj Srinath
Player of the match: R. Sai Kishore (Chepauk Super Gillies)

- IDream Tiruppur Tamizhans won the toss and elected to field.

Match 26
23 July 2022
19:15 (N)
Scorecard

Lyca Kovai Kings; 177/4 (20 overs)	v	Nellai Royal Kings; 172/9 (20 overs)
J. Suresh Kumar 75 (48); Sri Neranjan 1/21 (2 overs); M Shajahan 1/21 (2 overs)		Sanjay Yadav 54 (31); R Divakar 3/40 (3 overs)

Lyca Kovai Kings won by 5 runs
Salem Cricket Foundation Stadium, Salem
Umpires: GS Ananth Ramakrishnan and MM Srinivasa Rangan
Player of the match: J. Suresh Kumar (Lyca Kovai Kings)

- Lyca Kovai Kings won the toss and elected to bat.

Match 27
24 July 2022
15:15 (D/N)
Scorecard

Siechem Madurai Panthers; 136/6 (20 overs)	v	Ruby Trichy Warriors; 100 (18.4 overs)
Balchander Anirudh 34 (26); M Poiyamozhi 2/24 (4 overs)		S Santosh 31 (26); Jagatheesan Kousik 4/15 (4 overs)

Siechem Madurai Panthers won by 36 runs
Salem Cricket Foundation Stadium, Salem
Umpires: K Raghuram and S Nishaanth
Player of the match: Sunny Sandhu (Siechem Madurai Panthers)

- Ruby Trichy Warriors won the toss and elected to field.

Match 28
24 July 2022
19:15 (N)
Scorecard

Salem Spartans; 124/8 (20 overs)	v	Dindigul Dragons; 106/9 (20 overs)
Daryl Ferrario 38 (36); Rajendran Vivek 2/25 (3 overs)		Vimal Khumar 43 (37); Ganeshan Periyaswamy 3/11 (4 overs)

Salem Spartans won by 18 runs
Salem Cricket Foundation Stadium, Salem
Umpires: Sadashiv Iyer and M Madhu
Player of the match: Ganeshan Periyaswamy (Salem Spartans)

- Salem Spartans won the toss and elected to bat.

== Playoffs ==
Semifinals
27 July 2022 — Salem Cricket Foundation Stadium, Salem
1	Nellai Royal Kings	140 (20 overs)
2	Chepauk Super Gillies	141/5 (19.2 overs)
26 July 2022 — Salem Cricket Foundation Stadium, Salem
3	Siechem Madurai Panthers	126/7 (20 overs)
4	Lyca Kovai Kings	72/0 (9.5 overs)

Preliminary final
29 July 2022 — SNR College Cricket Ground, Coimbatore, Coimbatore
4	Lyca Kovai Kings	209/8 (20 overs)
1	Nellai Royal Kings	208/6 (20 overs)

Final
31 July 2022 — SNR College Cricket Ground, Coimbatore
2	Chepauk Super Gillies	14/2 (4 overs)
4	Lyca Kovai Kings	138/9 (17 overs)

=== Preliminary ===
==== Eliminator ====
26 July 2022
19:15 (N)
Scorecard

Siechem Madurai Panthers; 126/7 (20 overs)	v	Lyca Kovai Kings; 72/0 (9.5 overs)
Arun Karthik 47* (51); Ajith Ram 2/24 (4 overs)		Ganga Sridhar Raju 49* (40)

Lyca Kovai Kings won by 20 runs (DLS method)
Salem Cricket Foundation Stadium, Salem
Umpires: K Raghuram and Krishnamachari Srinivasan
Player of the match: Ganga Sridhar Raju (Lyca Kovai Kings)

- Siechem Madurai Panthers won the toss and elected to bat.

==== Qualifier 1 ====
27 July 2022
19:15 (N)
Scorecard

Nellai Royal Kings; 140 (20 overs)	v	Chepauk Super Gillies; 141/5 (19.2 overs)
Baba Aparajith 33 (31); Manimaran Siddharth 2/14 (4 overs)		R. Sai Kishore 43 (27); Karthick Manikandan 3/14 (4 overs)

Chepauk Super Gillies won by 5 wickets
Salem Cricket Foundation Stadium, Salem
Umpires: Krishnamachari Srinivasan and Saidharshan Kumar
Player of the match: R. Sai Kishore (Chepauk Super Gillies)

- Chepauk Super Gillies won the toss and elected to field.

==== Qualifier 2 ====
29 July 2022
19:15 (N)
Scorecard

Nellai Royal Kings; 208/6 (20 overs)	v	Lyca Kovai Kings; 209/8 (20 overs)
Sanjay Yadav 55 (26); Abhishek Tanwar 2/34 (4 overs)		Shahrukh Khan 58* (24); Karthick Manikandan 3/46 (4 overs)

Lyca Kovai Kings won by 2 wickets
SNR College Cricket Ground, Coimbatore
Umpires: GS Ananth Ramakrishnan and Krishnaraj Srinath
Player of the match: Shahrukh Khan (Lyca Kovai Kings)

- Lyca Kovai Kings won the toss and elected to field.

=== Final ===
31 July 2022
19:15 (N)
Scorecard

Lyca Kovai Kings; 138/9 (17 overs)	v	Chepauk Super Gillies; 14/2 (4 overs)
Sai Sudharsan 65 (42); Sandeep Warrier 4/29 (4 overs)		Radhakrishnan 9* (11); Ajith Ram 1/0 (1 over)

No result
Chepauk Super Gillies and Lyca Kovai Kings were declared as co-champions
SNR College Cricket Ground, Coimbatore
Umpires: Krishnaraj Srinath and Sadashiv Iyer
Player of the match: Sandeep Warrier (Chepauk Super Gillies)

- Chepauk Super Gillies won the toss and elected to field.
- The match was reduced to 17 overs per side.
- Chepauk Super Gillies and Lyca Kovai Kings declared co-champions.
