= 2023 Tamil Nadu Premier League =

Cricket tournament

- Dates: 12 June – 12 July 2023
- Administrator: Tamil Nadu Cricket Association
- Cricket format: Twenty20
- Tournament format(s): Round-robin and play-offs
- Host: India
- Champions: Lyca Kovai Kings (2nd title)
- Runners-up: Nellai Royal Kings
- Participants: 8
- Matches: 32
- Player of the series: Guruswamy Ajitesh (Nellai Royal Kings)
- Most runs: Guruswamy Ajitesh (Nellai Royal Kings) (385)
- Most wickets: Shahrukh Khan (Lyca Kovai Kings) (17)

The 2023 Tamil Nadu Premier League, also known as (TNPL-7) or, for sponsorship reasons, Shriram Capital TNPL was the seventh season of the Tamil Nadu Premier League (TNPL). It took place from 12 June 2023 to 12 July 2023.

Chepauk Super Gillies and Lyca Kovai Kings were the co-defending champions from the previous season.

== Participating teams ==
There are eight franchises competing in league. The franchises are named after a district it is representing in the state.

– Home city
Team locations and match venues

Team	Captain	Coach
Chepauk Super Gillies	Narayan Jagadeesan	Hemang Badani
Dindigul Dragons	Ravichandran Ashwin	Subramaniam Badrinath
IDream Tiruppur Tamizhans	R. Sai Kishore	R. Prasanna
Lyca Kovai Kings	Shahrukh Khan	Sriram Somayajula
Nellai Royal Kings	Arun Karthik	A. G. Guruswamy
Ba11sy Trichy	Ganga Sridhar Raju	Tinu Yohannan
Salem Spartans	Abhishek Tanwar	Robin Bist
Siechem Madurai Panthers	Hari Nishaanth	Bharath Reddy

== Rules ==
A number of new laws/rules have been introduced in this season:

- An "Impact Player" rule allowing sides to substitute a player during a match from four named substitutes.
- Decision Review System (DRS) system will only be used in case of dismissals.
- Reserve days were allotted to playoff matches.

== Venues ==
A total of four venues will be used in the 2023 season. The tournament started at Coimbatore and final will be held in Tirunelveli.

- Indian Cement Company Ground, Tirunelveli
- NPR College Ground, Dindigul
- SNR College Cricket Ground, Coimbatore
- Salem Cricket Foundation Stadium, Salem

== Squads ==
Chepauk Super Gillies	Dindigul Dragons	IDream Tiruppur Tamizhans	Lyca Kovai Kings	Nellai Royal Kings	Ba11sy Trichy	Salem Spartans	Siechem Madurai Panthers
Narayan Jagadeesan (c); Baba Aparajith; Harish Kumar; B Iyappan; Lokesh Raj; Madhan Kumar; Pradosh Ranjan Paul; Rocky Bhasker; Ramalingam Rohit; Sanjay Yadav; S Santosh Shiv; Uthirasamy Sasidev; Rajagopal Sathish; Rahil Shah; R Sibi; M Silambarasan; M Viju Arul	Baba Indrajith (c); Adithya Ganesh; Advaith Sharma; Affan Khader; S Arun; Ravichandran Ashwin; Suboth Bhati; Rohan Bhutra; VP Diran; Hemanth Kumar; G Kishoor; Boopathi Kumar; M Mathivannan; Sarath Kumar; P Saravana Kumar; Shivam Singh; Tamil Dhileepan; Varun Chakravarthy; P Vignesh; Vimal Khumar	R. Sai Kishore (c); Ajith Ram; Balchander Anirudh; P Bhuvaneswaran; NS Chaturved; S Ganesh; Alliraj Karuppusamy; S Manigandan; Mohamed Ali; G Parthasarathy; Ganeshan Periyaswamy; Radhakrishnan; M Ragavan; Vijay Shankar; Trilok Nath; Tushar Raheja; I. Vetrivel; Vishal Vaidhya; Rajendran Vivek	Shahrukh Khan (c); Atheeq Ur Rahman; R Divakar; Gowtham Thamarai Kannan; P Hemcharan; Kiran Akash; M Mohammed; U Mukilesh; Om Prakash; Ram Arvindh; B Sachin; Sai Sudharsan; Manimaran Siddharth; Jhathavedh Subramanyan; S Sujay; Suresh Kumar; P Vidyuth; Valliappan Yudheeswaran	Arun Karthik (c)	Ganga Sridhar Raju (c)	Abhishek Tanwar (c)	Hari Nishaanth (c)

=== Points table ===
Pos	Team	Pld	W	L	NR	Pts	NRR
1	Lyca Kovai Kings (C)	7	6	1	0	12	2.076
2	Dindigul Dragons	7	6	1	0	12	−0.271
3	Nellai Royal Kings	7	5	2	0	10	0.696
4	Siechem Madurai Panthers	7	4	3	0	8	−0.324
5	Chepauk Super Gillies	7	3	4	0	6	0.683
6	IDream Tiruppur Tamizhans	7	2	5	0	4	−0.486
7	Salem Spartans	7	2	5	0	4	−1.244
8	Ba11sy Trichy	7	0	7	0	0	−2.009

Source: ESPNcricinfo

- Advanced to the qualifiers
- Advanced to the eliminator
- Eliminated from Tournament

== League stage ==
Match 1
12 June 2023
19:15 (N)
Scorecard

Lyca Kovai Kings; 179/7 (20 overs)	v	IDream Tiruppur Tamizhans; 109 (20 overs)
Sai Sudharsan 86 (45); Vijay Shankar 3/26 (4 overs)		Tushar Raheja 33 (33); Shahrukh Khan 3/20 (4 overs)

Lyca Kovai Kings won by 70 runs
SNR College Cricket Ground, Coimbatore
Umpires: Madanagopal Kuppuraj and Krishnamachari Srinivasan
Player of the match: Sai Sudharsan (Lyca Kovai Kings)

- IDream Tiruppur Tamizhans won the toss and elected to field.
- Impact Player Subs: Atheeq Ur Rahman for B. Sachin (Lyca Kovai Kings) and Vishal Vaidhya for Ganeshan Periyaswamy (IDream Tiruppur Tamizhans) were the first Impact Players to be used in the TNPL.

Match 2
13 June 2023
19:15 (N)
Scorecard

Chepauk Super Gillies; 217/5 (20 overs)	v	Salem Spartans; 165/9 (20 overs)
Pradosh Ranjan Paul 88 (55); Sunny Sandhu 2/32 (4 overs)		Muhammed Adnan Khan 47* (15); Rocky Bhasker 2/13 (2 overs)

Chepauk Super Gillies won by 52 runs
SNR College Cricket Ground, Coimbatore
Umpires: Rajesh Kannan and Krishnamachari Srinivasan
Player of the match: Pradosh Ranjan Paul (Chepauk Super Gillies)

- Chepauk Super Gillies won the toss and elected to bat.

Match 3
14 June 2023
15:15 (D/N)
Scorecard

Siechem Madurai Panthers; 126/8 (20 overs)	v	Nellai Royal Kings; 129/4 (13.4 overs)
Hari Nishaanth 64 (51); Mohan Prasath 3/26 (4 overs)		Nidhish Rajagopal 42* (26); V Gowtham 1/4 (1 over)

Nellai Royal Kings won by 6 wickets
SNR College Cricket Ground, Coimbatore
Umpires: M Ashwin Kumar and Madanagopal Kuppuraj
Player of the match: Mohan Prasath (Nellai Royal Kings)

- Siechem Madurai Panthers won the toss and elected to bat.

Match 4
14 June 2023
19:15 (N)
Scorecard

Ba11sy Trichy; 120 (19.1 overs)	v	Dindigul Dragons; 122/4 (14.5 overs)
Ganga Sridhar Raju 48 (41); Varun Chakravarthy 3/21 (4 overs)		Shivam Singh 46 (30); T. Natarajan 1/15 (3 overs)

Dindigul Dragons won by 6 wickets
SNR College Cricket Ground, Coimbatore
Umpires: Saidharshan Kumar and Krishnamachari Srinivasan
Player of the match: Varun Chakravarthy (Dindigul Dragons)

- Ba11sy Trichy won the toss and elected to bat.

Match 5
15 June 2023
19:15 (N)
Scorecard

IDream Tiruppur Tamizhans; 120/7 (20 overs)	v	Chepauk Super Gillies; 121/3 (15.4 overs)
Radhakrishnan 36 (33); Harish Kumar 2/12 (4 overs)		Baba Aparajith 46* (29); Ajith Ram 2/15 (4 overs)

Chepauk Super Gillies won by 7 wickets
SNR College Cricket Ground, Coimbatore
Umpires: M Ashwin Kumar and Krishnamachari Srinivasan
Player of the match: Harish Kumar (Chepauk Super Gillies)

- IDream Tiruppur Tamizhans won the toss and elected to bat.

Match 6
16 June 2023
19:15 (N)
Scorecard

Lyca Kovai Kings; 181/6 (20 overs)	v	Nellai Royal Kings; 182/6 (20 overs)
Sai Sudharsan 90 (52); M Poiyamozhi 3/29 (4 overs)		Guruswamy Ajitesh 112 (60); Shahrukh Khan 1/12 (2 overs)

Nellai Royal Kings won by 4 wickets
SNR College Cricket Ground, Coimbatore
Umpires: Rajesh Kannan and Saidharshan Kumar
Player of the match: Guruswamy Ajitesh (Nellai Royal Kings)

- Nellai Royal Kings won the toss and elected to field.

Match 7
18 June 2023
15:15 (D/N)
Scorecard

Ba11sy Trichy; 139/9 (20 overs)	v	Salem Spartans; 143/5 (15.2 overs)
Mani Bharathi 40 (33); Abhishek Tanwar 3/9 (4 overs)		Kaushik Gandhi 52* (32); G. Godson 3/34 (4 overs)

Salem Spartans won by 5 wickets
NPR College Ground, Dindigul
Umpires: Sadashiv Iyer and M. Madhu
Player of the match: Abhishek Tanwar (Salem Spartans)

- Ba11sy Trichy won the toss and elected to bat.

Match 8
18 June 2023
19:15 (N)
Scorecard

Siechem Madurai Panthers; 123 (19.3 overs)	v	Dindigul Dragons; 124/3 (14.1 overs)
Jagatheesan Kousik 45 (34); Suboth Bhati 3/19 (4 overs)		Baba Indrajith 78* (48); Gurjapneet Singh 3/18 (4 overs)

Dindigul Dragons won by 7 wickets
NPR College Ground, Dindigul
Umpires: GS Ananth Ramakrishnan and Krishnaraj Srinath
Player of the match: Suboth Bhati (Dindigul Dragons)

- Dindigul Dragons won the toss and elected to field.

Match 9
19 June 2023
19:15 (N)
Scorecard

Chepauk Super Gillies; 126/8 (20 overs)	v	Lyca Kovai Kings; 128/2 (16.3 overs)
Harish Kumar 32 (20); Valliappan Yudheeswaran 3/29 (4 overs)		Sai Sudharsan 64* (43); Rahil Shah 1/26 (4 overs); Lokesh Raj 1/26 (4 overs)

Lyca Kovai Kings won by 8 wickets
NPR College Ground, Dindigul
Umpires: Mohamed Rafi and K. Raghuram
Player of the match: Valliappan Yudheeswaran (Lyca Kovai Kings)

- Lyca Kovai Kings won the toss and elected to field.

Match 10
20 June 2023
19:15 (N)
Scorecard

Nellai Royal Kings; 124 (18.2 overs)	v	IDream Tiruppur Tamizhans; 128/3 (18.2 overs)
Sonu Yadav 35 (32); P Bhuvaneswaran 5/17 (3.2 overs)		Tushar Raheja 49 (43); Sonu Yadav 2/23 (4 overs)

IDream Tiruppur Tamizhans won by 7 wickets
NPR College Ground, Dindigul
Umpires: Sadashiv Iyer and MM Srinivasa Rangan
Player of the match: P Bhuvaneswaran (IDream Tiruppur Tamizhans)

- IDream Tiruppur Tamizhans won the toss and elected to field.

Match 11
21 June 2023
15:15 (D/N)
Scorecard

Dindigul Dragons; 170/9 (20 overs)	v	Chepauk Super Gillies; 169/9 (20 overs)
Adithya Ganesh 44 (30); Rahil Shah 3/38 (4 overs)		Baba Aparajith 74 (40); Varun Chakravarthy 3/23 (4 overs)

Dindigul Dragons won by 1 run
NPR College Ground, Dindigul
Umpires: Sadashiv Iyer and Mohamed Rafi
Player of the match: Suboth Bhati (Dindigul Dragons)

- Chepauk Super Gillies won the toss and elected to field.

Match 12
21 June 2023
19:15 (N)
Scorecard

Ba11sy Trichy; 117/6 (20 overs)	v	Lyca Kovai Kings; 119/4 (18.2 overs)
Ganga Sridhar Raju 58 (55); Manimaran Siddharth 3/13 (4 overs)		S. Sujay 72* (59); Daryl Ferrario 2/17 (4 overs)

Lyca Kovai Kings won by 6 wickets
NPR College Ground, Dindigul
Umpires: K Raghuram and GS Ananth Ramakrishnan
Player of the match: S. Sujay (Lyca Kovai Kings)

- Lyca Kovai Kings won the toss and elected to field.

Match 13
22 June 2023
19:15 (N)
Scorecard

Salem Spartans; 115/4 (16 overs)	v	Nellai Royal Kings; 129/5 (15.4 overs)
Kaushik Gandhi 51 (43); Lakshay Jain 2/17 (2 overs)		Guruswamy Ajitesh 39 (31); Abhishek Tanwar 2/30 (4 overs)

Nellai Royal Kings won by 5 wickets (DLS method)
NPR College Ground, Dindigul
Umpires: MM Srinivasa Rangan and Krishnaraj Srinath
Player of the match: Kaushik Gandhi (Salem Spartans)

- Nellai Royal Kings won the toss and elected to field.
- Nellai Royal Kings were set a revised target of 129 runs from 16 overs.

== Playoffs ==
Play-offs started on 7 July 2023.

Qualifier 1 / Eliminator
7 July 2023 – Salem
1	Lyca Kovai Kings	193/7 (20 overs)
2	Dindigul Dragons	163/9 (20 overs)
8 July 2023 – Salem
3	Nellai Royal Kings	211/6 (20 overs)
4	Siechem Madurai Panthers	207/4 (20 overs)

Qualifier 2
10 July 2023 – Tirunelveli
Q1L	Dindigul Dragons	185/5 (20 overs)
EW	Nellai Royal Kings	191/3 (20 overs)

Final
12 July 2023 – Tirunelveli
Q1W	Lyca Kovai Kings	205/5 (20 overs)
Q2W	Nellai Royal Kings	101 all out (15 overs)
