= 2021 Tamil Nadu Premier League =

Cricket tournament

- Dates: 19 July – 15 August 2021
- Administrator: Tamil Nadu Cricket Association
- Cricket format: Twenty20
- Tournament format(s): Round-robin and play-offs
- Host(s): M. A. Chidambaram Stadium, Chennai.
- Champions: Chepauk Super Gillies (3rd title)
- Runners-up: Ruby Trichy Warriors
- Participants: 8
- Matches: 32
- Player of the series: Chezhian Harinishanth (Dindigul Dragons) (368 runs)
- Most runs: Chezhian Harinishanth (Dindigul Dragons) (368)
- Most wickets: P Saravana Kumar (Ruby Trichy Warriors) (13)
- Official website: http://tnpl.tnca.cricket

The 2021 Tamil Nadu Premier League, also known as (TNPL-5) or, for sponsorship reasons, Shriram Capital TNPL, was the fifth season of the Tamil Nadu Premier League (TNPL), a professional Twenty20 cricket league established by the Tamil Nadu Cricket Association (TNCA) in 2016 . It was scheduled from July 19 to August 15, 2021. The revised schedule was announced by TNCA on 7 July 2021 with all the matches played in Chennai. Chepauk Super Gillies were the defending champions from the 2019 edition of TNPL, while the 2020 edition was postponed and then cancelled due to COVID-19 pandemic.

On 6 August 2021, Chepauk Super Gillies became the first team to qualify to the playoffs after they beat Lyca Kovai Kings. Later, the following day, Dindigul Dragons became the second team, qualified to the playoffs, after their win over IDream Tiruppur Tamizhans. On 8 August 2021, the final day of League stage, Lyca Kovai Kings confirmed their playoffs spot, after beating Nellai Royal Kings. At the end of the league stage, Ruby Trichy Warriors who were finished on top of the table, also qualified for playoffs.

In the first qualifier, Ruby Trichy Warriors defeated the Chepauk Super Gillies to seat a place in the final. Dindigul Dragons through to the second qualifier, after they beat Lyca Kovai Kings in the eliminator match. On 13 August 2021, Chepauk Super Gillies defeated the Dindigul Dragons to face the Ruby Trichy Warriors in the final.

Defending champions Chepauk Super Gillies successfully retained their title with a 8 run win against Ruby Trichy Warriors in the final on 15 August 2021.

== Background ==
Originally, the league was scheduled to take place from June 2021. In June 2021, the tournament was suspended for an indefinite amount of time due to ongoing COVID-19 pandemic and lockdown restrictions in Tamil Nadu. However, on 26 June 2021, the Board of Control for Cricket in India (BCCI) announced that the tournament would resume from July 2021. TNCA was planned to resume the tournament as they got the clearance from the state government. Subsequently, on 7 July 2021, TNCA got approval from the state government and announced the revised schedule.

== Teams ==
=== Teams ===
There are eight franchises competing in league. The franchises are named after a district it is representing in the state. Each team can have a maximum of 22 players that includes two outstation players. In 2020, two of the franchises changed their names and bases – VB Kanchee Veerans now renamed as Nellai Royal Kings .

– Home city
Team locations and match venues

| Team | City | District | Captain | Coach | Owner |
|---|---|---|---|---|---|
| Chepauk Super Gillies | Chennai | Chennai | Kaushik Gandhi | Hemang Badani | Metronation Chennai Television Private Limited – Dailythanthi |
| Dindigul Dragons | Dindigul | Dindigul | Hari Nishanth | Subramaniam Badrinath | Take Solutions Ltd |
| IDream Tiruppur Tamizhans | Tiruppur | Tiruppur | M. Mohammed | Ramaswamy Prasanna | iDream Cinemas and iDream Properties |
| Lyca Kovai Kings | Coimbatore | Coimbatore | Shahrukh Khan | Sriram Somayajula | Lyca Productions |
| Nellai Royal Kings | Tirunelveli | Tirunelveli | Baba Aparajith | Jayakumar G | Crown Forts Limited |
| Ruby Trichy Warriors | Tiruchirapalli | Tiruchirapalli | Rahil S Shah | Guruswamy | Ruby Builders |
| Salem Spartans | Salem | Salem | Daryl Sundar Ferrarrio | B. Ramprakash | Vivo Chennai south distributor Selvakumar M |
| Siechem Madurai Panthers | Madurai | Madurai | N S Chaturvedi | Selvam Suresh Kumar | Pooja Damodaran |

== Venue ==
A total of three venues were used until 2019. Grounds in Dindigul and Tirunelveli hosts every match in the league stages between them. Tournament were planned to start at Tirunelveli and finals to be held at Salem Cricket Foundation Stadium.

Two new venues in Salem and Coimbatore were slated to host matches from 2020 onwards. The ground in Coimbatore was expected to host matches in the fourth season itself. But TNCA wanted age-group tournaments held there first before TNPL. Initially, no matches were scheduled to play in Chennai venue for the season.

As per the revised schedule announced on 7 July 2021, all the matches were played at M. A. Chidambaram Stadium, Chennai.

Tamil Nadu
Chennai
M. A. Chidambaram Stadium
Capacity: 50,000
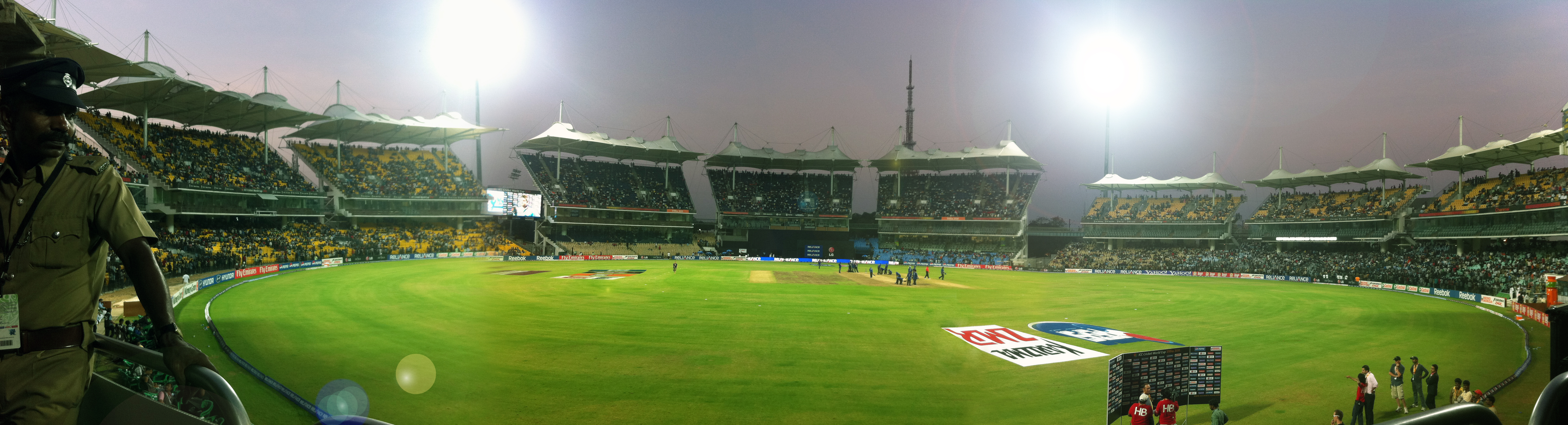

== Squads ==
| Chepauk Super Gillies | Dindigul Dragons | IDream Tiruppur Tamizhans | Lyca Kovai Kings | Ruby Trichy Warriors | Nellai Royal Kings | Salem Spartans | Siechem Madurai Panthers |
|---|---|---|---|---|---|---|---|
| Kaushik Gandhi (c); B Arun; S Vijayakumar; Rajagopal Sathish; R Ram; Arvind; RS Jaganath Srinivas; V Santhana Sekar; Manimaran Siddharth; S Sujay; S Harish Kumar; V Arun Kumar; H Prasidh Akash; R Sai Kishore; Narayan Jagadeesan; V Sai Prakash; R Alexander; U Sasidev; Sonu Yadav; Rahul D; Sandeep Warrier; Radhakrishnan S | R Srinivasan (c); K Vishal Vaidhya; S Arun; Advaith Sharma; R Suthesh; S Swaminathan; L Vignesh; RS Mokit Hariharan; S Lokeshwar; C Hari Nishaanth; C Ashwin; MS Sanjay; V Lakshman; K Mani Bharathy; AR Siva Murugan; Gurjapneet Singh; R Vimal Khumar; Kishan Kumar S; Vigneshwaran S; Ravichandran Ashwin; R Vivek; M Silambarasan | M. Mohammed (c); S Dinesh; S Manigandan; RI Raajkumar; S Mohan Prasath; S Siddharth; S Aravind; Maan K Bafna; P Francis Rokins; K Gowtham Thamarai Kannan; Aswin Crist; Tushar Raheja; A Karuppusamy; C Shriram; Mohammed Ashik N; Affan Khader M; Adithya Giridhar; Saathiyaannaryan L; M Rooban Raj; Mohan Prasath S; Maan K Bafna; R Rajkumar; Natarajan ST; Ashwin Balaji S; Dinesh Karthik | Shahrukh Khan (c); P Shijit Chandran; J Suresh Kumar; J Gowjith Subash; K Vignesh; GR Manish; R Kavin; G Aravindh; V Ganga Sridhar Raju; U Mukilesh; Abhishek Tanwar; MA Atheeq Ur Rahman; N Selva Kumaran; Ashwin Venkataraman; Sai Sudharsan; Nishanth Kumar Alwar; Srinivasan E; Thangarasu Natarajan; Kiran Kasshyap; Yudheeswaran V; Anandakumar S; S Ajith Ram | Rahil S Shah (c); B Rahul; Akash Sumra; ME Yazh Arun Mozhi; Anirudha Srikkanth; M Poiyamozhi; S Santosh Shiv; W Antony Dhas; Aditya Ganesh; Nidhish S Rajagopal; R Ganesh; Sumant Jain; Muhammed Adnan Khan; P Saravana Kumar; VP Amith Sathvik; G Hemanth Kumar; K Mukunth; G Karthick Shanmugam; Mathivanan; Karthik R; Murali Vijay | Baba Aparajith (c); H Trilok Nag; CH Jitendra Kumar; Sanjay Yadav R; V Athisayaraj Davidson; T Ajith Kumar; M Abhinav; NS Harish; Pradosh Ranjan Paul; S Sharun Kumar; Baba Indrajith; Ashwath Mukunthan; L Suryap Prakash; S Senthil Nathan; Jitendra Kumar CH; Rohit Ram R; Sathraj A; Veeramani T; Sri Neranjan R; Vivek R; Suresh C; Arjun P Murthy. | Darryl Sundar Ferrario (c); Praneesh B; Abhishek S; Akshay V Srinivasan; Murugan Ashwin; Boopalan S; Ganesh Moorthi; KH Gopinath; Lokesh Raj TD; Periyasamy G; Shubam Mehta; Sushil U; Vijay Shankar; Vijay Kumar M; Washington Sundar; Karthikeyan R; Kishoor G; Aarif A; R Karthikeyan; M Suganesh; Abhinav Vishnu; AVR Ratnam; Mihir R | NS Chaturved (c); R Mithun; V Gowtham; PS Nirmal Kumar; P Praveen Kumar; B Anirudh Sita Ram; KB Arun Karthik; R Rohit; R Aushik Srinivas; J Kousik; DT Chandrasekar; V Aaditya; R Silambarasan; M Shahjahan; K Deeban Lingesh; Varun Chakravarthy; J Subramanyam; Rajkumar K; Sughendiran P; Saravanan PK; Aaditya V; Sunil Sam; L Kiran Akash |

== Standings ==
=== Points table ===
| Pos | Team | Pld | W | L | NR | Pts | NRR |
|---|---|---|---|---|---|---|---|
| 1 | Ruby Trichy Warriors (RU) | 7 | 5 | 2 | 0 | 10 | 0.710 |
| 2 | Chepauk Super Gillies (C) | 7 | 4 | 2 | 1 | 9 | 0.562 |
| 3 | Dindigul Dragons (3rd) | 7 | 4 | 3 | 0 | 8 | 0.396 |
| 4 | Lyca Kovai Kings (4th) | 7 | 3 | 3 | 1 | 7 | −0.088 |
| 5 | Nellai Royal Kings | 7 | 3 | 3 | 1 | 7 | −0.485 |
| 6 | Siechem Madurai Panthers | 7 | 2 | 4 | 1 | 5 | 0.597 |
| 7 | Salem Spartans | 7 | 2 | 4 | 1 | 5 | −0.730 |
| 8 | IDream Tiruppur Tamizhans | 7 | 2 | 4 | 1 | 5 | −1.142 |

Source: TNCA, ESPNcricinfo
- Advanced to the qualifiers
- Advanced to the eliminator
- Eliminated from Tournament

=== League progression ===
| | Group matches | | | | | | | Knockout | | | |
| Team | 1 | 2 | 3 | 4 | 5 | 6 | 7 | Q1 | E | Q2 | Final |
| Chepauk Super Gillies | 1 | 1 | 3 | 5 | 7 | 9 | 9 | L | | W | C |
| Dindigul Dragons | 0 | 2 | 4 | 6 | 6 | 6 | 8 | | W | L | |
| IDream Tiruppur Tamizhans | 1 | 1 | 3 | 3 | 5 | 5 | 5 | | | | |
| Lyca Kovai Kings | 1 | 3 | 3 | 5 | 5 | 5 | 7 | | L | | |
| Nellai Royal Kings | 0 | 2 | 2 | 3 | 5 | 7 | 7 | | | | |
| Ruby Trichy Warriors | 2 | 2 | 4 | 4 | 6 | 8 | 10 | W | | | RU |
| Salem Spartans | 1 | 3 | 3 | 3 | 3 | 3 | 5 | | | | |
| Siechem Madurai Panthers | 2 | 2 | 2 | 3 | 5 | 5 | 5 | | | | |

| Team's results | Won | Lost | S/O | N/R |

- C – Champion
- RU – Runner-up

== League stage ==
=== Fixtures ===
| Date | Time (IST) | Toss | Team 1 | Margin | Team 2 | Ground | Player of the match |
|---|---|---|---|---|---|---|---|
| July 19, Mon | 07:30 PM | Salem Spartans elected to field | Lyca Kovai Kings; 168/5 (18 overs) | Match 1 No result Scorecard | Salem Spartans | M. A. Chidambaram Stadium, Chennai | Match abandoned due to rain |
| July 20, Tue | 07:30 PM | Chepauk Super Gillies elected to field | IDream Tiruppur Tamizhans; 64/7 (16.2 overs) | Match 2 No result Scorecard | Chepauk Super Gillies | M. A. Chidambaram Stadium, Chennai | Match abandoned due to rain |
| July 21, Wed | 07:30 PM | Nellai Royal Kings elected to field | Ruby Trichy Warriors; 151/5 (20 overs) | Match 3 won by 74 runs Scorecard | Nellai Royal Kings; 77 (13.4 overs) | M. A. Chidambaram Stadium, Chennai | Amit Sathvik (RTW); 71 (52) |
| July 22, Thu | 07:30 PM | Siechem Madurai Panthers elected to field | Dindigul Dragons; 96 (18.5 overs) | Match 4 won by 6 wickets Scorecard | Siechem Madurai Panthers; 97/4 (15 overs) | M. A. Chidambaram Stadium, Chennai | Jagatheesan Kousik (SMP); 3/23 (4 overs), 31 (26) |
| July 23, Fri | 07:30 PM | Ruby Trichy Warriors elected to bat | Ruby Trichy Warriors; 171/7 (20 overs) | Match 5 won by 8 wickets Scorecard | Lyca Kovai Kings; 175/2 (18.1 overs) | M. A. Chidambaram Stadium, Chennai | Ganga Sridhar Raju (LKK); 74 (52) |
| July 24, Sat | 03:30 PM | Chepauk Super Gillies elected to bat | Chepauk Super Gillies; 165/7 (20 overs) | Match 6 won by 7 wickets Scorecard | Nellai Royal Kings; 167/3 (19.4 overs) | M. A. Chidambaram Stadium, Chennai | Pradosh Ranjan Paul (NRK); 62 (52) |
| July 24, Sat | 07:30 PM | Salem Spartans elected to bat | Salem Spartans; 164/5 (20 overs) | Match 7 won by 16 runs Scorecard | IDream Tiruppur Tamizhans; 148/8 (20 overs) | M. A. Chidambaram Stadium, Chennai | Daryl Ferrario (SS); 40 (27) |
| July 25, Sun | 03:30 PM | Ruby Trichy Warriors elected to field | Siechem Madurai Panthers; 137/6 (20 overs) | Match 8 won by 3 wickets Scorecard | Ruby Trichy Warriors; 138/7 (19 overs) | M. A. Chidambaram Stadium, Chennai | Muhammad Adnan Khan (RTW); 53 (38) |
| July 25, Sun | 07:30 PM | Dindigul Dragons elected to field | Lyca Kovai Kings; 201/1 (20 overs) | Match 9 won by 5 wickets Scorecard | Dindigul Dragons; 202/5 (18 overs) | M. A. Chidambaram Stadium, Chennai | Mani Bharathi (DD); 81 (32) |
| July 26, Mon | 07:30 PM | IDream Tiruppur Tamizhans elected to field | Nellai Royal Kings; 148 (19.5 overs) | Match 10 won by 3 wickets Scorecard | IDream Tiruppur Tamizhans; 149/7 (19.5 overs) | M. A. Chidambaram Stadium, Chennai | Mann Bafna (ITT); 72 (51) |
| July 27, Tue | 07:30 PM | Dindigul Dragons elected to field | Ruby Trichy Warriors; 145/5 (20 overs) | Match 11 won by 5 wickets Scorecard | Dindigul Dragons; 149/5 (19.2 overs) | M. A. Chidambaram Stadium, Chennai | RS Mokit Hariharan (DD); 41* (26) |
| July 28, Wed | 03:30 PM | Chepauk Super Gillies elected to field | Salem Spartans; 142/7 (20 overs) | Match 12 won by 4 wickets Scorecard | Chepauk Super Gillies; 145/6 (18.5 overs) | M. A. Chidambaram Stadium, Chennai | Narayan Jagadeesan (CSG); 52 (40) |
| July 28, Wed | 07:30 PM | Siechem Madurai Panthers elected to field | Lyca Kovai Kings; 172/5 (20 overs) | Match 13 won by 19 runs Scorecard | Siechem Madurai Panthers; 153/8 (20 overs) | M. A. Chidambaram Stadium, Chennai | Shahrukh Khan (LKK); 58* (30) |
| July 29, Thu | 07:30 PM | Ruby Trichy Warriors elected to field | IDream Tiruppur Tamizhans; 110/8 (20 overs) | Match 14 won by 7 wickets Scorecard | Ruby Trichy Warriors; 111/3 (17.2 overs) | M. A. Chidambaram Stadium, Chennai | M Poiyamozhi (RTW); 3/25 (4 overs) |
| July 30, Fri | 07:30 PM | Salem Spartans elected to field | Dindigul Dragons; 186/5 (20 overs) | Match 15 won by 76 runs Scorecard | Salem Spartans; 109 (18.4 overs) | M. A. Chidambaram Stadium, Chennai | Vivek R (DD); 59 (41) |
| July 31, Sat | 03:30 PM | Lyca Kovai Kings elected to field | IDream Tiruppur Tamizhans; 162/7 (20 overs) | Match 16 won by 2 runs Scorecard | Lyca Kovai Kings; 160/8 (20 overs) | M. A. Chidambaram Stadium, Chennai | M Mohammed (ITT); 33 (25) & 4/31 (4 overs) |
| July 31, Sat | 07:30 PM | Nellai Royal Kings elected to field | Siechem Madurai Panthers; 144/8 (19.2 overs) | Match 17; No result Scorecard | Nellai Royal Kings | M. A. Chidambaram Stadium, Chennai | Match abandoned due to rain |
| Aug 1, Sun | 03:30 PM | Ruby Trichy Warriors elected to field | Salem Spartans; 116/8 (20 overs) | Match 18 won by 6 wickets Scorecard | Ruby Trichy Warriors; 120/4 (18.3 overs) | M. A. Chidambaram Stadium, Chennai | Rahil Shah (RTW); 1/16 (4 overs) |
| Aug 1, Sun | 07:30 PM | Dindigul Dragons elected to field | Chepauk Super Gillies; 159/7 (20 overs) | Match 19 won by 24 runs Scorecard | Dindigul Dragons; 135/8 (20 overs) | M. A. Chidambaram Stadium, Chennai | Narayan Jagadeesan (CSG); 40 (27) |
| Aug 2, Mon | 07:30 PM | IDream Tiruppur Tamizhans elected to field | Siechem Madurai Panthers; 184/4 (20 overs) | Match 20 won by 81 runs Scorecard | IDream Tiruppur Tamizhans; 103 (17.4 overs) | M. A. Chidambaram Stadium, Chennai | N S Chaturved (SMP); 41* (23) |
| Aug 3, Tue | 07:30 PM | Nellai Royal Kings elected to field | Dindigul Dragons; 147/5 (20 overs) | Match 21 won by 5 wickets Scorecard | Nellai Royal Kings; 148/5 (18.5 overs) | M. A. Chidambaram Stadium, Chennai | Baba Aparajith (NRK); 44 (42) |
| Aug 4, Wed | 07:30 PM | Siechem Madurai Panthers elected to bat | Siechem Madurai Panthers; 124/9 (20 overs) | Match 22 won by 5 wickets Scorecard | Chepauk Super Gillies; 125/5 (18.5 overs) | M. A. Chidambaram Stadium, Chennai | Manimaran Siddharth (CSG); 4/20 (4 overs) |
| Aug 5, Thu | 07:30 PM | Salem Spartans elected to bat | Salem Spartans; 120/8 (20 overs) | Match 23 won by 8 wickets Scorecard | Nellai Royal Kings; 121/2 (18.3 overs) | M. A. Chidambaram Stadium, Chennai | Sanjay Yadav (NRK); 41* (26) |
| Aug 6, Fri | 07:30 PM | Lyca Kovai Kings elected to field | Chepauk Super Gillies; 159/7 (20 overs) | Match 24 won by 36 runs Scorecard | Lyca Kovai Kings; 123/9 (20 overs) | M. A. Chidambaram Stadium, Chennai | Rajagopal Sathish (CSG); 64 (32) |
| Aug 7, Sat | 03:30 PM | Dindigul Dragons elected to field | IDream Tiruppur Tamizhans; 145/7 (20 overs) | Match 25 won by 6 wickets Scorecard | Dindigul Dragons; 147/4 (17 overs) | M. A. Chidambaram Stadium, Chennai | Rajendran Vivek (DD); 1/23 (3 overs), 57* (28) |
| Aug 7, Sat | 07:30 PM | Salem Spartans elected to bat | Salem Spartans; 144/5 (20 overs) | Match 26 won by 11 runs Scorecard | Siechem Madurai Panthers; 133/8 (20 overs) | M. A. Chidambaram Stadium, Chennai | Vijay Shankar (SS); 47 (40), 1/22 (2 overs) |
| Aug 8, Sun | 03:30 PM | Lyca Kovai Kings elected to bat | Lyca Kovai Kings; 169/6 (20 overs) | Match 27 won by 7 runs Scorecard | Nellai Royal Kings; 162/8 (20 overs) | M. A. Chidambaram Stadium, Chennai | Shahrukh Khan (SS); 64* (29) |
| Aug 8, Sun | 07:30 PM | Chepauk Super Gillies elected to bat | Chepauk Super Gillies; 132 (20 overs) | Match 28 won by 7 wickets Scorecard | Ruby Trichy Warriors; 136/3 (19.1 overs) | M. A. Chidambaram Stadium, Chennai | Nidish Rajagopal (RTW); 66* (58) |

| Result | Winner |
| Team 1 | Played 1st innings |

== Playoffs ==
Semifinals
10 August 2021 — M. A. Chidambaram Stadium, Chennai
1 | Ruby Trichy Warriors | 157/5 (19.5 overs)
2 | Chepauk Super Gillies | 153/3 (20 overs)
11 August 2021 — M. A. Chidambaram Stadium, Chennai
3 | Dindigul Dragons | 144/5 (17.3 overs)
4 | Lyca Kovai Kings | 143/6 (20 overs)

Preliminary final
13 August 2021 — M. A. Chidambaram Stadium, Chennai
2 | Chepauk Super Gillies | 106/2 (16 overs)
3 | Dindigul Dragons | 103 (20 overs)

Final
15 August 2021 — M. A. Chidambaram Stadium, Chennai
1 | Ruby Trichy Warriors | 175/7 (20 overs)
2 | Chepauk Super Gillies | 183/6 (20 overs)

=== Preliminary ===
==== Qualifier 1 ====
10 August 2021
19ː30 (N)
Scorecard

| Chepauk Super Gillies; 153/3 (20 overs) | v | Ruby Trichy Warriors; 157/5 (19.5 overs) |
| Sundaraman Radhakrishnan 82* (54); P Saravana Kumar 2/32 (4 overs) | | Aditya Ganesh 66* (45); Rajagopal Sathish 1/19 (4 overs) |

Ruby Trichy Warriors won by 5 wickets
M. A. Chidambaram Stadium, Chennai
Umpires: Jayaraman Madanagopal and Krishnaraj Srinath
Player of the match: Aditya Ganesh (Ruby Trichy Warriors)

- Ruby Trichy Warriors won the toss and elected to field.

==== Eliminator ====
11 August 2021
19ː30 (N)
Scorecard

| Lyca Kovai Kings; 143/6 (20 overs) | v | Dindigul Dragons; 144/5 (17.3 overs) |
| Sai Sudharshan 57 (40); Gurjapneet Singh 3/22 (4 overs) | | Hari Nishanth 59 (44); Yudheeswaran V 2/22 (2 overs) |

Dindigul Dragons won by 5 wickets
M. A. Chidambaram Stadium, Chennai
Umpires: Krishnamachari Srinivasan and Sadashiv Iyer
Player of the match: Hari Nishanth (Dindigul Dragons)

- Dindigul Dragons won the toss and elected to field.

==== Qualifier 2 ====
13 August 2021
19ː30 (N)
Scorecard

| Dindigul Dragons; 103 (20 overs) | v | Chepauk Super Gillies; 106/2 (16 overs) |
| Chezhian Harinishanth 56 (46); Ravisrinivasan Sai Kishore 3/14 (4 overs) | | Kaushik Gandhi 53 (41); Rangaraj Suthesh 1/12 (4 overs) |

Chepauk Super Gillies won by 8 wickets
M. A. Chidambaram Stadium, Chennai
Umpires: Saidharshan Kumar and Krishnamachari Srinivasan
Player of the match: Ravisrinivasan Sai Kishore (Chepauk Super Gillies)

- Chepauk Super Gillies won the toss and elected to field.

=== Final ===
15 August 2021
19ː30 (N)
Scorecard

| Chepauk Super Gillies; 183/6 (20 overs) | v | Ruby Trichy Warriors; 175/7 (20 overs) |
| Narayan Jagadeesan 90 (58); Rahil Shah 2/31 (4 overs) | | P Saravana Kumar 45* (25); Sonu Yadav 2/32 (4 overs) |

Chepauk Super Gillies won by 8 runs
M. A. Chidambaram Stadium, Chennai
Umpires: Jayaraman Madanagopal and Krishnamachari Srinivasan
Player of the match: Narayan Jagadeesan (Chepauk Super Gillies)

- Ruby Trichy Warriors won the toss and elected to field.
