= List of Tamil Nadu cricketers =

This is a list of all cricketers who have played first-class, list A or Twenty20 cricket for Tamil Nadu cricket team (formerly called Madras cricket team). Seasons given are first and last seasons; the player did not necessarily play in all the intervening seasons. Players in bold have played international cricket.

Last updated at the end of the 2015/16 season.

== A ==
- George Abraham, 1949/50 - 1952/53
- Antony Adams, 1975/76 - 1978/79
- William Adams, 1936/37
- Habib Ahmed, 1961/62 - 1962/63
- Balu Alaganan, 1946/47 - 1954/55
- Ashique Ali, 1995/96 - 1996/97
- Shabir Ali, 1975/76
- Bellipadi Chandrahasa Alva, 1944/45 - 1954/55
- Bellipadi Sridhar Alva, 1953/54 - 1958/59
- Palani Amarnath, 2006/07 - 2012/13
- P. B. Anand, 1994/95
- A. Ananthanarayanan, 1943/44 - 1946/47
- Baba Aparajith, 2011/12 - 2015/16
- Thirugnanasambandam Arasu, 1998/99 - 2001/02
- V. Aruldass, 1945/46 - 1950/51
- **Bharat Arun**, 1982/83 - 1991/92
- Krishnan Arunkumar, 1984/85 - 1988/89
- Varadarajan Arunkumar, 2010/11
- P. R. Ashokanand, 1961/62
- Murugan Ashwin, 201213 - 2015/16
- **Ravichandran Ashwin**, 2006/07 - 2015/16

== B ==
- R. Babulnath, 1980/81
- **Hemang Badani**, 1996/97-2006/07
- **Subramaniam Badrinath**, 2000/01-2013/14
- K. Balaji, 1974/75-1979/80
- **Lakshmipathy Balaji**, 2001/02-2015/16
- S. Balaji, 1980/81
- M. K. Balakrishnan, 1952/53-1961/62
- S. Balakrishnan, 1953/54-1956/57
- M. Balasubramaniam, 1953/54-1956/57
- M. Baliah, 1935/36-1936/37
- H. D. Ballal, 1963/64-1965/66
- Prakash Bangara, 1953/54-1958/59
- Patamada Belliappa, 1959/60-1973/74
- B. S. R. Bhadradri, 1937/38-1943/44
- N. Bharathan, 1976/77
- C. K. Bhaskaran, 1966/67-1968/69
- Rajat Bhatia, 1999/00-2001/02
- M. G. Bhavanarayanan, 1952/53-1955/56
- M. V. Bobjee, 1945/46-1949/50

== C ==
- Robert Carrick, 1926/27
- D. L. Chakravarti, 1949/50-1956/57
- Seetharaman Chandramouli, 1996/97-1997/98
- D. T. Chandrasekar, 2014/15-2015/16
- **V. B. Chandrasekhar**, 1986/87-1994/95
- R. Chandrasekharan, 1962/63
- Cherry Chandy, 1956/57
- Thiruvenkati Chari, 1934/35-1939/40
- Raghunath Chinnadorai, 1950/51-1958/59
- Aswin Crist, 2013/14-2015/16

== D ==
- Michael Dalvi, 1967/68-1976/77
- Safi Darashah, 1930/31
- Anthony Das, 2014/15-2015/16
- S. G. Deenan, 1937/38-1941/42
- Damodaran Devanand, 1995/96-1999/00
- V. Devendran, 2006/07
- Devarasan Dhandapani, 2001/02-2003/04
- P. K. Dharmalingam, 1965/66-1969/70
- Patrick Dickinson, 1952/53
- Thiruvengala Doraiappan, 1963/64-1970/71
- T. M. Doraiswami, 1936/37-1940/41
- G. S. Dutt, 1946/47
- Dakshina Murthy, 1948/49-1955

== E ==
- Akbar Ebrahim, 1984/85-1985/86
- Lawrence Edmonds, 1972/73-1974/75
- Napoleon Einstein, 2006/07-2013/14

== F ==
- Peter Fernandez, 1980/81
- Patrick Furtado, 1951/52-1952/53

== G ==
- C. Ganapathy, 2003/04-2011/12
- C. R. Ganapathy, 1926/27-1935/36
- Kaushik Gandhi, 2011/12-2015/16
- S. Ganesan, 1949/50-1950/51
- M. Gautam, 1977/78-1985/86
- Narayanan Gautam, 1988/89-1993/94
- Anand George, 1998/99-1999/00
- Richard George, 1935/36-1936/37
- J. S. Ghanshyam, 1970/71
- Dwarkanath Girish, 1984/85-1988/89
- T. V. Girish, 1950/51
- E. Godfrey, 1935/36
- D. J. Gokulakrishnan, 1993/94-2003/04
- M. S. Gopal, 1934/35-1943/44
- S. Gopalakrishnan, 1969/70-1970/71
- **M. J. Gopalan**, 1926/27-1951/52
- **C. D. Gopinath**, 1949/50-1962/63
- Harikrishnan Gopinath, 2006/07-2014/15
- Sunny Gupta, 2011/12

== H ==
- Syed Mohammad Hadi, 1932/33
- C. K. Haridas, 1941/42
- Sunil Haridas, 1973/74-1974/75
- Susheel Haridas, 1971/72-1974/75
- Harjinder Singh, 1981/82
- J. C. Hart, 1957/58
- Jawad Hussain, 1964/65
- Najam Hussain, 1966/67-1969/70
- Syed Mohammad Hussain, 1926/27-1933/34

== I ==
- Baba Indrajith, 2013/14-2015/16

== J ==
- Abdul Jabbar, 1972/73-1986/87
- Tanveer Jabbar, 1993/94-1999/00
- V. Jagannathan, 1930/31
- Jagdish Singh, 1963/64-1968/6
- Edward Jeffares, 1948/49
- Rajamani Jesuraj, 2003/04-2011/12
- C. P. Johnstone, 1926/27-1944/45
- Henry Joynt, 1957/58

== K ==
- B. Kalyanasundaram, 1968/69-1977/78
- M. S. Kamath, 1959/60-1961/62
- K. S. Kannan, 1941/42-1956/57
- N. Kannayiram, 1948/49-1956/57
- Kanwaljit Singh, 1986/87
- **Aashish Kapoor**, 1989/90-2006/07
- Arun Karthik, 2007/08-2013/14
- **Dinesh Karthik**,

2002/03-2019/20

- **Karthick Veerabaghu** , 2003/04-2007/08
- Bahirathan Karthikeyan, 2002/03
- M. C. Karthikeyan, 1940/41
- Thalaisayanam Karunamurthy, 1995/96-1996/97
- Jagannathan Kaushik, 2011/12-2015/16
- Guru Kedarnath, 2005/06
- Shahrukh Khan, 2013/14-2015/16
- Bharat Khanna, 1933/34
- J. Kousik, 2015/16
- **A. G. Kripal Singh**, 1950/51-1964/65
- Arjan Kripal Singh, 1988/89-1994/95
- Swaran Kripal Singh, 1985/86
- S. M. Krishnakumar, 1975/76
- P. K. Krishnamurthy, 1959/60
- K. Krishnappa, 1935/36
- A. V. Krishnaswami, 1930/31-1943/44
- C. V. Krishnaswami, 1943/44-1946/47
- K. Krishnaswami, 1947/48
- Ajjampur Krishnaswamy, 1962/63
- V. Krishnaswamy, 1970/71-1979/80
- K. Bharath Kumar, 1977/78-1982/83
- Dharma Kumar, 2010/11
- Ganesh Kumar, 1998/99-2003/04
- C. Hemanth Kumar, 2000/01-2005/06
- M. M. Kumar, 1959/60-1960/61
- S. Kumar, 1997/98
- Santosh Kumar, 1979/80-1982/83
- Shanmugham Senthil Kumar, 2005/06
- Valapathy Senthil Kumar, 1997/98
- K. Shiv Kumar, 1994/95
- Selvam Suresh Kumar, 2007/08-2014/15
- Varun Kumar, 2006/07
- U. S. Kumar, 1989/90-1991/92
- **Vaman Kumar**, 1955/56-1976/77
- Vasant Kumar, 1996/97-1998/99
- Vikram Kumar, 2001/02-2004/05
- Tamil Kumaran, 2003/04-2009/10
- **Thirunavukkarasu Kumaran**, 1996/97-2001/02
- V. J. Kumaraswamy, 1976/77

== L ==
- C. K. Lakshmanan, 1930/31
- John Law, 1940/41-1941/42
- Sinderraj Lokenderraj, 1960/61

== M ==
- Robert McIntosh, 1933/34
- John McIver, 1937/38
- Jayaraman Madanagopal, 1998/99-2003/04
- Kunjiran Madhavan, 1956/57 - 1966/67
- N. P. Madhavan, 1980/81-1984/85
- Rangachari Madhavan, 1982/83-1989/90
- Sadagoppan Mahesh, 1993/94-2002/03
- Yo Mahesh, 2004/05-2014/15
- Subramani Mani, 1958/59-1960/61
- S. V. S. Mani, 1961/62-1970/71
- Vikram Mani, 2006/07
- S. S. Manoharan, 1937/38
- Ramdas Mardi, 1947/48-1949/50
- Jakkaladaki Maruthi, 1963/64
- Petson Mathew, 2003/04
- Satyajit Medappa, 1999/00
- Siddharth Medappa, 1998/99
- **A. G. Milkha Singh**, 1958/59-1968/69
- Patrick Miller, 1930/31
- Rashid Mirza, 1972/73
- Ravi Mishra, 1984/85-1985/86
- Urmikant Mody, 1968/69
- M. Mohammed, 2012/13-2015/16
- Syed Mohammed, 2005/06-2010/11
- K. Mohanakrishnan, 1939/40-1941/42
- P. S. Moses, 1976/77-1984/85
- Mujib-ur-Rehman, 1989/90-1991/92
- T. M. Murari, 1962/63-1965/66
- **Abhinav Mukund**, 2007/08-2015/16
- P. Mukund, 1970/71-1979/80
- Kommireddi Murthy, 1966/67-1967/68
- M. K. Murugesh, 1953/54-1958/59

== N ==
- S. Nagaswamy, 1961/62
- Ren Nailer, 1926/27-1944/45
- C. K. Nainakannu, 1935/36-1941/42
- T. S. Narasimhan, 1952/53
- S. Narayanan, 1969/70
- Ramadoss Naresh, 2003/04-2007/08
- S. Nataraj, 1969/70-1975/76
- **Thangarasu Natarajan**, 2014/15
- **C. K. Nayudu**, 1926/27

== P ==
- Gopal Pai, 1951/52-1953/54
- **Phiroze Palia**, 1933/34
- Prasanth Parameswaran, 2014/15
- T. S. Parankusam, 1935/36-1944/45
- C. D. Parthasarathi, 1935/36-1937/38
- Gopalaswami Parthasarathi, 1936/37-1943/44
- R. T. Parthasarathi, 1947/48-1955/56
- T. V. Parthasarathi, 1943/44
- Mandayam Parthasarathy, 1981/82-1982/83
- Huzefa Patel, 2004/05-2005/06
- Jayantibhai Patel, 1956/57-1966/67
- S. K. Patel, 1975/76-1976/77
- Reuben Paul, 1995/96-2000/01
- Alexander Penfold, 1925/26-1926/27
- R. M. Perumal, 1945/46-1949/50
- premraj anand, 2022/23-2033/34
- Terence Peterson, 1936/37
- E. C. Phillip, 1943/44-1947/48
- R. Prabhakar, 1966/67-1974/75
- Murthy Prabhu, 2009/10-2014/15
- M. V. Prakash, 1947/48-1949/50
- P. C. Prakash, 1985/86-1989/90
- V. Prasad, 1982/83
- Ramaswamy Prasanna, 2006/07-2015/16
- Hari Prasanth, 1997/98-1998/99
- Chelliah Prathiban, 2012/13
- Theodore Pritchett, 1930/31

== R ==
- Udamalpet Radhakrishnan, 1987/88
- George Rae, 1936/37-1937/38
- R. Raghavan, 1954/55-1959/60
- R. Raghavan, 1952/53
- R. Raghavan, 1965/66
- Raju Raghuram, 2004/05
- Mohan Rai, 1955/56-1962/63
- Kakkudasam Rajagopal, 1966/67-1969/70
- V. Rajagopalan, 1972/73
- V. Rajaram, 1963/64-1965/66
- K. Rajendran, 1959/60-1967/68
- Natarajan Rajendran, 1963/64-1965/66
- Padmanabhan Rajesh, 1995/96-1996/97
- Immanuel Rajkumar, 1986/87
- A. C. Rajmanickam, 1958/59
- Padmanabhan Raju, 2002/03-2003/04
- Narasimhan Ram, 1965/66
- P. S. Ramachandran, 1934/35-1941/42
- T. Ramachandran, 1943/44-1945/46
- Y. Ramachandran, 1953/54-1957/58
- J. Ramakrishnan, 1954/55-1958/59
- K. S. Ramamurthi, 1936/37
- **W. V. Raman**, 1982/83-1998/99
- P. V. Ramanathan, 1934/35-1935/36
- B. V. Ramanujam, 1934/35-1935/36
- **Cotah Ramaswami**, 1926/27-1941/42
- Cota Ramaswaroop, 1957/58
- Janardhanan Ramdas, 1988/89-1989/90
- K. J. Ramadyani, 1978/79
- P. Ramesh, 1974/75-1980/81
- R. Ramesh, 1970/71
- Ran Ramesh, 1963/64-1972/73
- **Sadagoppan Ramesh**, 1995/96-2004/05
- Shankaranarayanan Ramesh, 1993/94-1994/95
- Srinivasan Ramesh, 1990/91
- Ramakrishnan Ramkumar, 2001/02-2007/08
- Raja of Ramnad, 1941/42
- A. G. Ram Singh, 1932/33-1946/47
- **C. R. Rangachari**, 1938/39-1953/54
- Mark Ranganathan, 1934/35-1935/36
- T. Ranganathan, 1947/48
- Malolan Rangarajan, 2011/12-2015/16
- Kolar Ananthaswamy Rao, 1957/58-1959/60
- Balaji Rao, 1967/68-1969/70
- **Balaji Rao**, 1994/95-2000/01 (played international cricket for Canada)
- Ganapathy Rao, 1951/52
- B. S. Krishna Rao, 1940/41-1946/47
- Madhava Rao, 1938/39-1941/42
- Narayanaswami Rao, 1936/37-1939/40
- Prabhakar Rao, 1956/57-1966/67
- Rammohan Rao, 1978/79-1980/81
- Vasudeva Rao, 1960/61
- Venkatesh Rao, 1961/62
- **Vivek Razdan**, 1990/91
- **Bharath Reddy**, 1973/74-1985/86
- Cyril Reed, 1937/38
- Frederick Richardson, 1943/44-1944/45
- William Robins, 1937/38-1938/39
- Maurice Robinson, 1944/45
- **Robin Singh**, 1985/86-2001/02
- Francis Rogers, 1933/34
- Ramesh Ravichandran, 2018/20

== S ==
- Sunil Sam, 2010/11-2014/15
- M. Sambandam, 1936/37
- Mullassery Sanjay, 1988/89-1995/96
- Martin Sanjeev, 2011/12
- A. K. Sarangapani, 1949/50-1955/56
- Arjun Sarathy, 2004/05
- Vasanth Saravanan, 1997/98-2002/03
- Thalaivan Sargunam, 2012/13
- Harihara Sastry, 1955/56
- Rajagopal Sathish, 2000/01-2015/16
- A. G. Satwender Singh, 1963/64-1975/76
- B. R. Sekhar, 1959/60-1967/68
- **T. A. Sekhar**, 1976/77-1987/88
- Mylvahanan Senthilnathan, 1987/88-1997/98
- E. H. D. Sewell, 1894/95
- Rahil Shah, 2011/12-2015/16
- Shahabuddin, 1932/33
- Bharath Shankar, 2014/15-2015/16
- R. Shankar, 1970/71
- **Vijay Shankar**, 2011/12-2019/20
- Sridharan Sharath, 1992/93-2006/07
- Arnold Shaw, 1934/35-1935/36
- Rajasekhar Shetty, 1953/54
- Mumbai Shrinivas, 2000/01-2006/07
- Poll Shyamsunder, 1953/54-1955/56
- Subramania Siva, 2009/10
- Mooverjanthali Sivakumar, 2004/05-2009/10
- M. Sivanath, 1932/33
- Ramanathan Sivaprakasham, 1990/91
- **Laxman Sivaramakrishnan**, 1981/82-1997/98
- Vidyut Sivaramakrishnan, 1999/00-2009/10
- Venkataraman Sivaramakrishnan, 1973/74-1989/90
- Archibald Southby, 1935/36-1936/37
- Ralph Spitteler, 1938/39
- A. R. Sridhar, 1950/51-1958/59
- Mirmisa Sridhar, 1969/70
- Veerragha Sridhar, 1957/58-1961/62
- Anirudha Srikkanth, 2003/04-2015/16
- **Krishnamachari Srikkanth**, 1978/79-1992/93
- Krishnaraj Srinath, 1995/96-1996/97
- Aushik Srinivas, 2009/10-2015/16
- Krishnamachari Srinivasan, 1993/94
- M. O. Srinivasan, 1941/42-1948/49
- Muthuswami Srinivasan, 1957/58-1964/65
- Rajhamanny Srinivasan, 2007/08
- Sampathkumar Srinivasan, 1986/87
- Sankaran Srinivasan, 1979/80-1984/85
- **T. E. Srinivasan**, 1970/71-1983/84
- **Sridharan Sriram**, 1993/94-2005/06
- S. P. Sriramulu, 1959/60
- Anthony Stansfeld, 1938/39-1947/48
- John Stephenson, 1930/31
- Prathaban Subbiah, 1998/99
- M. Subramaniam, 1959/60
- Sunil Subramaniam, 1988/89-1997/98
- H. Sundaram, 1974/75-1977/78
- P. R. Sundaram, 1959/60
- Venkat Sunderam, 1973/74
- Sunny Singh, 2011/12
- Chinnaswamy Suresh, 2006/07-2008/09
- Esak Suresh, 2003/04-2007/08
- Somasetty Suresh, 1999/00-2004/05
- A. P. Sureshkumar, 1986/87-1989/90
- C. S. Sureshkumar, 1982/83-1987/88
- Laxmesha Suryaprakash, 2014/15
- M. Suryanarayan, 1950/51-1955/56
- N. Suryanarayan, 1941/42-1948/49
- Umashankar Sushil, 2008/09-2014/15
- Rangaraj Suthesh, 2008/09-2010/11
- M. Swaminathan, 1940/41-1952/53
- Swaranjit Singh, 1958/59
- N. N. Swarna, 1930/31-1934/35
- Samburudeen.MP, 2004/05-

2011/12

== T ==
- Abhishek Tanwar, 2015/16
- Vikram Thambuswamy, 1967/68
- George Thomas, 1962/63-1969/70
- B. S. Thyagarajan, 1935/36-1936/37

== U ==
- M. A. Uttappa, 1933/34-1935/36

== V ==
- K. S. Vaidyanathan, 1964/65-1965/66
- S. V. Vaidyanathan, 1952/53-1960/61
- Sunil Valson, 1981/82
- P. V. Varadan, 1937/38-1941/42
- V. R. Varadarajan, 1936/37
- R. Vasan, 1982/83
- Divakar Vasu, 1987-1998/99
- K. Vasudevadas, 2003/04-2014/15
- Kennimbeli Vasudevamurthy, 1961/62
- S. Vasudevan, 1974/75-1988/89
- Sundaram Vasudevan, 2003/04
- M. K. Velu, 1953/54
- **Srinivasaraghavan Venkataraghavan**, 1963/64-1984/85
- **M. Venkataramana**, 1987/88-1998/99
- M. Venkataramanjulu, 1925/26-1934/35
- N. J. Venkatesan, 1939/40-1951/52
- R. Venkatesan, 1959/60
- Rajgopalan Venkatesh, 1985/86-1986/87
- J. S. Versey-Brown, 1940/41
- Ganapathi Vignesh, 2001/02-2010/11
- Krishnamoorthy Vignesh, 2013/14
- Lakshminarayanan Vignesh, 2015/16
- **Murali Vijay**, 2005/06-2015/16
- P. Vijayakumar, 1975/76-1982/83
- P. Vijayaraghavan, 1970/71
- Mani Vikram, 2006/07
- Sunil Viswanathan, 1998/99-2003/04
- Viswesh Lakshmanan, 2008–2010

== W ==
- Humphrey Ward, 1925/26-1938/39
- Harry White, 1932/33
