= Prabhakar Rao =

Indian cricketer (1935–2019)

Personal information
- Full name: Udipi Prabhakar Rao
- Born: 4 August 1935; Madras, India
- Died: 9 June 2019 (aged 83)
- Source: Cricinfo, 25 April 2021

Prabhakar Rao (4 August 1935 – 9 June 2019) was an Indian cricketer. He played in 32 first-class matches for Madras from 1956/57 to 1966/67. Following his cricket career, he became the vice-president of the Tamil Nadu Cricket Association.

== See also ==
- List of Tamil Nadu cricketers
