= Balu Alaganan =

Personal information
- Full name: Balu Alaganan
- Born: 1925
- Died: 11 October 2012 (aged 87); Chennai, Tamil Nadu, India

Domestic team information
- Years: Team
- 1946/47–1954/55: Madras
- Source: ESPNcricinfo, 22 June 2016

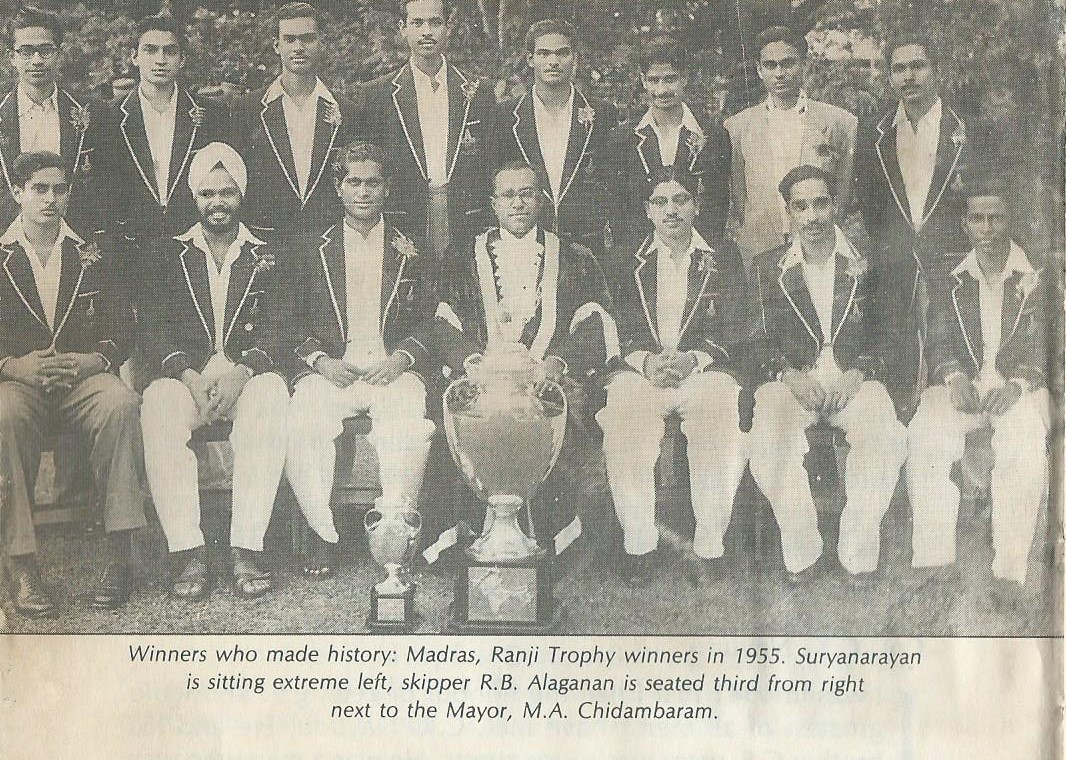
The First Tamil Nadu Ranji Trophy Triumph Team of 1954–1955 with Captain R. B. Alaganan.

R. B. Alaganan (1925 – 11 October 2012), better known as Balu Alaganan, was an Indian cricket player, administrator and commentator. He played six first-class matches for Madras and captained the team to its maiden Ranji Trophy title. A well-known radio commentator, he also worked in administrative roles for the Tamil Nadu Cricket Association.

== Life and career ==
Alaganan was born in 1925 and hailed from a planting family in Bodinayakkanur. He completed his schooling at S. Thomas' College, Ceylon, and graduated from the Madras Christian College.

An all-rounder who batted in the middle-order, Alaganan represented Madras in six first-class matches between 1946 and 1955. He was the captain of the Madras team that won its maiden Ranji Trophy title in 1954–55. He retired after the season and turned to radio commentary. As a commentator he was described by The Hindu as "a lucid, to-the-point narrator, imparting to his observations the weight of experience and expertise that underlined an academic, intellectual approach."

Alaganan also worked in administrative roles after retirement. He worked as the vice-president of the Tamil Nadu Cricket Association (TNCA) from 1961 to 1986. He also became the president of Madras Cricket Club in 1967. In 1988, he became the president of TNCA and held the position until 1993. After having worked as a selector, he worked as the assistant team manager of India on its tours to New Zealand and West Indies in the 1975–76 season, with Polly Umrigar as the manager.

Alaganan also won club-level titles in golf and tennis. He was the first Indian member and Indian president of the Kodaikanal Club.

Alaganan died on 11 October 2012 at his house in Chennai. He was married and had a son and two daughters.
