= Napoleon Einstein =

Indian cricketer

Personal information
- Full name: Napoleon Einstein
- Born: 16 August 1989 (age 37); Chennai, Tamil Nadu, India
- Batting: Right-handed
- Bowling: Right arm off break
- Role: Batsman

Domestic team information
- Years: Team
- 2007, 2014: Tamil Nadu

Career statistics
Competition	LA	T20
Matches	2	1
Runs scored	93	19
Batting average	46.50	19.00
100s/50s	0/1	0/0
Top score	92	19
Catches/stumpings	0/–	1/–
- Source: ESPNcricinfo, 13 August 2026

Napoleon Einstein (born 16 August 1989) is an Indian cricketer. He is a right-handed opening batsman. He played for Tamil Nadu in domestic cricket and was signed by Chennai Super Kings for the Indian Premier League.

Einstein made his List A debut for Tamil Nadu against Kerala in a Ranji One-Day Trophy match at Secunderabad in February 2007. Opening the batting, he scored 92, putting on 203 for the first wicket with Murali Vijay to set up a 46-run win. A month later, he played against Assam in the same competition but this time made only 1.

He has been batting, and bowling off spinners in under-19 tournaments and has been selected for the Indian team for the under-19 World Cup to be held in Malaysia in Feb 2008. India went on to win the under-19 world cup.

== Etymology of the name ==
Einstein's personal explanation of his name: "My grandfather was a scientist. He wrote a letter to Albert Einstein and even got a reply from him. I've got no idea [what the letter was about] even though I've read it. My mother was a physics graduate and she teaches Physics in a school. So I am Einstein. Napoleon is my father's name." Einstein also said, "We don't believe in God. In our family, we're rationalists. Other people are named Krishna and Ram after Gods, so we were named Einstein and Napoleon after great people."
