= Krishnaraj Sriram =

Indian cricketer (1973–2017)

Personal information
- Born: 15 November 1973; Madurai, India
- Died: 16 February 2017 (aged 43); Bangalore, India
- Batting: Right-handed
- Bowling: Right arm medium
- Role: Batsman
- Relatives: Krishnaraj Srinath (brother)
- Source: ESPNcricinfo, 18 February 2017

Krishnaraj Sriram (15 November 1973 – 16 February 2017) was an Indian cricketer. He played fifteen first-class matches for Karnataka between 1995 and 2000. He died from a cardiac arrest in Bangalore on 16 February 2017, aged 43.
