= Somasetty Suresh =

Indian cricketer (born 1973)

Personal information
- Born: 20 July 1973 (age 53); Madras, Tamil Nadu, India
- Role: Right-hand batsman Right-arm medium Match referee
- Source: Cricinfo, 27 July 2020

Somasetty Suresh is an Indian cricketer, who has played 95 first-class matches between 1997 and 2008. Suresh, an all rounder has played Ranji Trophy matches for Assam, Goa and Tamil Nadu, where he captained Tamil Nadu. and has played against England A team representing Tamil Nadu Cricket Association in 2004.
