= TK Madhavan =

Indian cricketer (born 1939)

Personal information
- Full name: Thottakat Kunjiran Madhavan
- Born: 11 November 1939 (age 87); Neyyoor, Tamilnadu
- Role: Right-hand batsman Right arm medium

Domestic team information
- Years: Team
- Kerala
- Tamil nadu
- Source: Cricinfo, 25 July 2021

Kunjiran Madhavan, popularly known as TK Madhavan is an Indian cricketer, who played 26 first-class matches between 1956 and 1967 for Tamil nadu, as well as Kerala. Mahadevan played as a fast medium bowler and his pace attack along with Kerala’s CK Bhaskaran Nair often intimidated even the strongest batsmen of that era.
