= Indian Cement Company Ground =

Cricket ground in India

Indian Cement Cricket Ground
- ICL Sankar Nagar Cricket Ground, ICL Cricket Ground
- Interactive map of Indian Cement Cricket Ground

Ground information
- Location: Tirunelveli, Tamil Nadu, India
- Country: India
- Coordinates: 8.788892°N 77.725990°E
- Capacity: 4000
- Owner: India Cements Limited
- Operator: Tamil Nadu Cricket Association

Team information
1996-present	(Tamil Nadu)
- As of 11 March 2020; Source: CricketArchive

Indian Cement Company Ground, also known as ICL Sankar Nagar Cricket Ground, is a cricket ground located in Tirunelveli in Tamil Nadu, India. The ground is in Bala Vidyalaya School run by India Cements. It is adjacent to the NH 44 in the village of Thaliyuthu.

From 2016, the ground has been used for hosting Tamil Nadu Premier League (TNPL) matches. As of 2020, it has hosted eight first-class and two List A cricket matches.

== Facilities ==
The ground has a seating capacity of 4,000. It was increased from 3,400 by the addition of two more stands in July 2017. The ground also has dressing rooms, media and commentary boxes. The ground uses up to 60 per cent recycled water from sewage treatment plants for pitch maintenance due to low rainfall in the region.

=== Safety measures ===
In 2017, a petition was filed with the High court's Madurai bench against the TNPL matches being held in the ground citing safety hazards. The reasons cited were proximity to accident-prone National Highway 44 with only one entrance. However, the court refused it while directing officials to ensure adequate infrastructure and safety measures at the ground. By July 2017, Tamil Nadu Cricket Association had erected up to 8 gates to ensure safe entrance and exit of the spectators, increased the height of the walls and set up roofs for the VIP gallery. The public gallery were still unroofed. Matches were held at the ground thereafter without any halt.

== See also ==
- NPR College Ground
- Guru Nanak College Ground
- Salem Cricket Foundation Stadium
