= Ganga Sridhar Raju =

Indian cricketer (born 1993)

Personal information
- Full name: Ganga Sridhar Raju
- Born: 25 April 1993 (age 33); Kakinada, Andhra Pradesh, India
- Batting: Left-handed

Domestic team information
- Years: Team
- 2016-present: Tamil Nadu

Career statistics
Competition	First-class	List A
Matches	10	19
Runs scored	629	411
Batting average	34.94	21.63
100s/50s	1/2	0/2
Top score	106	85
Balls bowled	114	41
Wickets	0	1
Bowling average	–	49.00
5 wickets in innings	–	0
10 wickets in match	–	0
Best bowling	–	1/3
Catches/stumpings	10/–	8/–
- Source: ESPNcricinfo, 4 May 2025

Ganga Sridhar Raju (born 25 April 1993) is an Indian cricketer. He made his first-class debut for Tamil Nadu in the 2016–17 Ranji Trophy on 1 January 2017. He made his List A debut for Tamil Nadu in the 2016–17 Vijay Hazare Trophy on 25 February 2017. He made his Twenty20 debut for Tamil Nadu in the 2017–18 Syed Mushtaq Ali Trophy on 21 January 2018.
