= Selvam Suresh Kumar =

Indian cricketer (born 1985)

Selvam Suresh Kumar (born 20 March 1985) is an Indian cricketer, currently representing Madras Cricket Club in Tamil Nadu Cricket Association's 1st Division League, and Puducherry in the Ranji Trophy. He formerly represented Tamil Nadu in Indian domestic cricket. He is an all-rounder who bats right-handed and bowls right-arm off spin.

== Career ==
Suresh Kumar made his debut in first-class cricket for Tamil Nadu against a Sri Lanka Cricket Invitational XI in September 2007, and his List A cricket debut against Madhya Pradesh in April 2008. He was signed up by Chennai Super Kings for the 2009 season of the Indian Premier League.
