= Laxmesha Suryaprakash =

Indian cricketer (born 1989)

Personal information
- Born: 27 September 1989 (age 37); Chennai, Tamil Nadu, India
- Source: ESPNcricinfo, 21 November 2016

Laxmesha Suryaprakash (born 27 September 1989) is an Indian cricketer. He made his first-class debut for Tamil Nadu in the 2016–17 Ranji Trophy on 21 November 2016. He made his List A debut on 28 February 2021, for Tamil Nadu in the 2020–21 Vijay Hazare Trophy.
