= Mohan Prasath =

Indian cricketer (born 1998)

Personal information
- Full name: Mohan Prasath
- Born: 30 June 1998 (age 28)
- Source: ESPNcricinfo, 7 January 2019

Mohan Prasath (born 30 June 1998) is an Indian cricketer. He made his first-class debut for Tamil Nadu in the 2018–19 Ranji Trophy on 7 January 2019.
