= Pradosh Ranjan Paul =

Indian cricketer (born 2000)

Personal information
- Full name: Pradosh Ranjan Paul
- Born: 21 December 2000 (age 25); Odisha, India
- Source: Cricinfo, 7 January 2019

Pradosh Ranjan Paul (born 21 December 2000) is an Indian cricketer. He made his first-class debut for Tamil Nadu in the 2018–19 Ranji Trophy on 7 January 2019. He made his List A debut on 26 February 2021, for Tamil Nadu in the 2020–21 Vijay Hazare Trophy.
