= B. Ramprakash =

Indian cricketer (born 1966)

Bhaskaran Ramprakash (born 18 December 1966 in Chennai, Tamil Nadu, India) is a retired Indian first class cricketer, who played for Kerala. He was a right arm off-break bowler and a right-handed middle order batsman. He played 64 first class matches, and took 233 wickets including 16 five wicket hauls. He also scored 2489 runs including a century.
