= Rajendran Vivek =

Indian cricketer (born 1991)

Personal information
- Born: 10 June 1991 (age 35)
- Source: Cricinfo, 21 February 2019

Rajendran Vivek (born 10 June 1991) is an Indian cricketer. He made his Twenty20 debut for Tamil Nadu in the 2018–19 Syed Mushtaq Ali Trophy on 21 February 2019.
