= Aushik Srinivas =

Indian cricketer (born 1993)

Personal information
- Full name: Raju Aushik Srinivas
- Born: 16 March 1993 (age 33); Coimbatore, Tamil Nadu, India
- Batting: Right-handed
- Bowling: Slow left-arm orthodox
- Role: Bowler

Domestic team information
- Years: Team
- 2009/10–present: Tamil Nadu

Career statistics
Competition	FC
Matches	51
Runs scored	164
Batting average	10.93
100s/50s	0/0
Top score	21*
Balls bowled	10,186
Wickets	134
Bowling average	32.83
5 wickets in innings	2
10 wickets in match	0
Best bowling	7/28
Catches/stumpings	13/–
- Source: ESPNcricinfo, 23 January 2013

Aushik Srinivas (born 16 March 1993) is a cricketer who plays for Tamil Nadu in Indian domestic cricket. He is a slow left-arm orthodox bowler. He made his first-class debut in 2009 at the age of 16.

He studies BTech at SRM Institute of Science and Technology. He was the leading wicket taker for the season in 2016 TNCA club matches.

He has bowled a marathon 85 overs in an innings against Rajasthan and had played a vital role in Tamil Nadu finishing Runners up in the 2011-12 Ranji Trophy.
