= Sri Ramakrishna College of Arts and Science =

College in Cominbatore, Tamil Nadu, India

Sri Ramakrishna College of Arts and Science (Autonomous)
- Formerly (SNR Sons College)
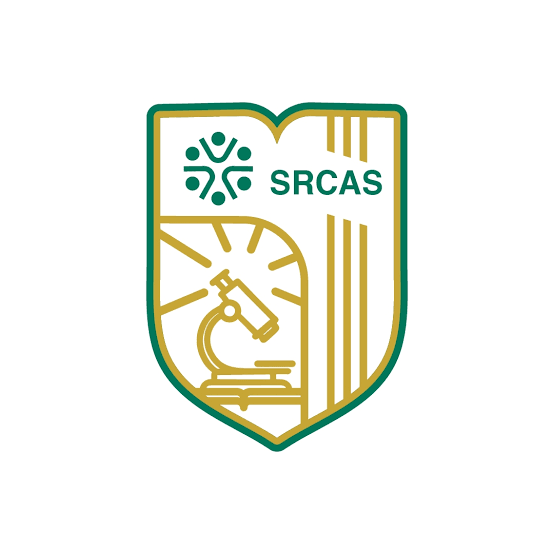
- Motto: Towering Genius Seeks Regions Unexplored
- Type: Private Autonomous
- Established: 1987
- Principal: B.L. Shivakumar
- Location: Coimbatore, Tamil Nadu, India; 11°1′57.36″N 77°2′4.43″E Avanashi Road, Coimbatore, Tamil Nadu
- Campus: Urban
- Language: English
- Website: www.srcas.ac.in

Sri Ramakrishna College of Arts and Science (Formerly SNR Sons College - An Autonomous Institution) is a College of Arts and Science in Coimbatore, Tamil Nadu, India. It was founded in 1987. At present, with 6500+ students, the college is offering 30+ programmes in Arts, Humanities, Science, Commerce and Management domains. The college of Accredited by NAAC with A+ grade. The college is ranked 56th among colleges in India by the National Institutional Ranking Framework (NIRF) in 2024.

== History ==
Sri Ramakrishna College of Arts and Science (Formerly SNR Sons College), Coimbatore, India was started in 1987 by Sevaratna Dr. R. Venkatesalu of the SNR Sons Charitable Trust. The college is situated at the heart of the Coimbatore city and has a beautiful scenic campus sprawling over an area of 16 acres with numerous imposing buildings. The college is autonomous (since 2004) in its third cycle and affiliated to Bharathiar University since 1987. It is re-accredited (fourth cycle) with 'A+' Grade by NAAC (National Accreditation and Assessment Council) and an ISO 9001: 2015 certified institution.

Sri Ramakrishna College of Arts and Science college was selected as one of the cleanest college in India by Swachhta Ranking of MHRD, Government of India, 2019. ASSOCHAM awarded the college as one among 'Best Private Arts & Science College in India'. Under the college category in the NIRF 2024 (Ministry of Education, Government of India) the college secured 56th Rank. The college is placed in Band C (Rank Above 50) by Atal Ranking of Institutions on Innovation Achievements (ARIIA 2020) - an initiative of Ministry of Human Resource Development (MHRD), Govt. of India. The Week magazine ranked the college as 'Top 50 Best Arts & Science College in India'. Careers360 ranked the college as "AAA+". It owns the SNR College Cricket stadium in which TNPL 2022 was conducted in Coimbatore, India.

== Courses ==
The institute offers 31 undergraduate courses and 11 postgraduate courses apart from Research programs.

Undergraduate Courses

Management

- BBA
- BBA Computer Application
- BBA Logistics

Commerce

- BCom
- BCom Accounting & Finance
- BCom Banking & Insurance
- BCom Computer Application
- BCom Professional Accounting
- BCom Business Process services (integrated with TCS)
- BCom Corporate Secretaryship
- BCom International Business
- BCom Information Technology
- BCom Cost & Management Accounting
- BCom Retail Marketing

Computer Science

- BSc Computer Science
- BSc Computer System and Cognitive Systems
- BSc Information Technology
- BCA Computer Applications
- BSc Computer Science with Data Analytics
- BSc Computer Science with Artificial Intelligence & Data Science
- BSc Computer Technology
- BSc Computer Science with Cyber Security
- BSc Computer Science with Digital & Cyber Forensic Science

Science

- BSc Electronics
- BSc Physics
- BSc Chemistry
- BSc Mathematics
- BSc Catering Science & Hotel Management
- BSc BioTechnology
- BSc Mathematics with Computer Applications

Humanities

- BA English Literature

Post Graduate Courses

- MBA (Full Time- AICTE approved)
- MSc CS
- MSc IT
- MSc Mathematics
- MSc ECS
- MSc VLSI
- MSW
- MIB
- MCom FCA
- MSc Bio Tech
- MA English Lit

Research programs

- Electronics
- Computer Science
- Commerce
- Management Science
- Mathematics
- English
- Tamil
- Library Science

Certificate / Diploma / Advanced Diploma Courses

- 35 courses related to all the discipline

== Facilities ==
- Sports and Games
- Training and Placement
- Add-on Courses
- Value Added Programmes
- Hostels
- Digital Library
- Internet LAB
- Fine Art and Culture
- NSS, NCC, YRC, RRC
- Tamil Mandram
- English Literary Club
- Eco (Green) Club
- Programming Club
- Rotaract
- Online Courses
- Coaching for Bank Exams
- Coaching for Government Exams
- Outbound Training
- Online Learning
- Online Assessment
- Management Information System
- Learning Management System

== Campus Life ==
Scenario is the Inter-Departmental Fest organized by the students of Sri Ramakrishna College of Arts & Science. It also comprises 30+ Clubs which includes Rotaract Club, NCC, Uyir Club, etc. for various activities to encourage students and enrich their skills.

== Principal ==
Dr B L Shivakumar, Principal & Secretary

== Notable alumni ==
- Narayan Jagadeesan, Cricketer, Chennai Super Kings
- Hari Nishanth, Cricketer, Chennai Super Kings

== See also ==
- Sri Ramakrishna Engineering College
- Sri Ramakrishna Hospital
