= Harish Kumar (cricketer) =

Indian cricketer (born 1989)

Personal information
- Full name: S Harish Kumar
- Born: 22 October 1989 (age 37); Chennai, Tamil Nadu
- Source: ESPNcricinfo, 29 January 2017

Harish Kumar (born 22 October 1989) is an Indian cricketer. He made his Twenty20 debut for Tamil Nadu in the 2016–17 Inter State Twenty-20 Tournament on 29 January 2017.
