= NPR College Ground =

Cricket ground

Coordinates: 10.24094°N 78.18673°E

- Interactive map of NPR College Ground

Ground information
- Location: Dindigul, Tamil Nadu, India
- Country: India
- Establishment: n/a
- Capacity: 5000
- Owner: Danasekar BA

Team information
| 2014-present | (Tamil Nadu) |

NPR College Ground is a cricket ground of NPR Group of Institute situated at Dindigul, Tamil Nadu. It is an artificial turf ground with a seating capacity of 5000 and flood lights.

The ground has hosted 10 first class cricket matches and it is also a venue for Tamil Nadu Premier League tournament.

== See also ==
- Indian Cement Company Ground
- Salem Cricket Foundation Stadium
