= Lakshminarayanan Vignesh =

Indian cricketer (born 1989)

Personal information
- Born: 20 March 1989 (age 37); Chennai, Tamil Nadu, India
- Source: ESPNcricinfo, 10 October 2015

Lakshminarayanan Vignesh (born 20 March 1989) is an Indian cricketer who plays for Tamil Nadu. He made his first-class debut on 1 October 2015 in the 2015–16 Ranji Trophy.
