= Krishnaraj Srinath =

Indian cricketer (born 1969)

Personal information
- Born: 23 November 1969 (age 56); Madurai, Tamil Nadu, India
- Batting: Right-handed
- Bowling: Right-arm off-break
- Relatives: Krishnaraj Sriram (brother)

Domestic team information
- Years: Team
- 1991–1994: Karnataka
- 1995–1997: Tamil Nadu
- FC debut: 27 December 1991 Karnataka v Hyderabad
- Last FC: 3 November 1996 Tamil Nadu v Goa
- LA debut: 7 December 1993 Karnataka v Andhra
- Last LA: 3 February 1996 Tamil Nadu v Karnataka

Umpiring information
- FC umpired: 51 (2009–2016)
- LA umpired: 19 (2011–2015)
- T20 umpired: 26 (2009–2015)

Career statistics
Competition	First-class	List A
Matches	24	8
Runs scored	1,169	152
Batting average	34.38	25.33
100s/50s	3/5	0/1
Top score	159	88
Balls bowled	460	66
Wickets	6	3
Bowling average	29.83	16.33
5 wickets in innings	0	0
10 wickets in match	0	0
Best bowling	2/5	2/30
Catches/stumpings	26/0	2/0
- Source: CricketArchive, 28 December 2016

Krishnaraj Srinath (born 23 November 1969) is an Indian cricket umpire and former Indian cricketer. He represented Karnataka and Tamil Nadu in Ranji Trophy. He featured as umpire in U-19 ODIs. He has also umpired in Ranji Trophy, Vijay Hazare Trophy and Indian Premier League

== Career ==
K.Srinath made his first class debut for Karnataka in 1991–92 and played for the state till 1993–94. In 1995–96, he moved to play for Tamil Nadu, the team he represented for a couple of seasons.
