= Sadashiv Iyer =

Indian cricketer (born 1972)

Personal information
- Born: 29 December 1972 (age 53); Nagpur, India

Umpiring information
- WODIs umpired: 5 (2015–2019)
- Source: Cricinfo, 11 October 2015

Sadashiv Iyer (born 29 December 1972) is an Indian former first class cricketer. He is now an umpire and has stood in matches in the 2015–16 Ranji Trophy.
