= P Saravana Kumar =

Indian cricketer (born 1989)

Personal information
- Born: 26 August 1989 (age 37)
- Source: ESPNcricinfo, 20 November 2021

P Saravana Kumar (born 26 August 1989) is an Indian cricketer. He made his Twenty20 debut on 8 November 2021, for Tamil Nadu in the 2021–22 Syed Mushtaq Ali Trophy, taking two wickets in the match. On 20 November 2021, in the semi-final match of the tournament against Hyderabad, Kumar took his first five-wicket haul in a T20 match, with Tamil Nadu winning by eight wickets to reach the final. He made his first-class debut on 17 February 2022, for Tamil Nadu in the 2021–22 Ranji Trophy.
