= Aswin Crist =

Indian cricketer (born 1994)

Personal information
- Full name: Antony Aswin Crist
- Born: 9 July 1994 (age 32); Chennai, Tamil Nadu, India
- Batting: Right-handed
- Bowling: Right-arm medium
- Role: All-rounder

Domestic team information
- Years: Team
- 2013–present: Tamil Nadu
- Source: ESPNcricinfo

Aswin Crist (born 9 July 1994) is an Indian first-class cricketer who plays for Tamil Nadu. He took the most wickets in the 2016–17 Vijay Hazare Trophy, with a total of 20 dismissals from 9 matches.
