= M. Mohammed =

Indian cricketer (born 1991)

Personal information
- Born: 3 December 1991 (age 34); Dindigul, Tamil Nadu, India
- Batting: Right-handed
- Bowling: Right-arm medium

Domestic team information
- Years: Team
- Tamil Nadu
- Source: ESPNcricinfo, 10 October 2017

M. Mohammed (born 3 December 1991) is an Indian cricketer who plays for Tamil Nadu. On 2 November 2018, he took a hat-trick in the match against Madhya Pradesh in the 2018–19 Ranji Trophy.
