= Sonu Yadav =

Indian cricketer (born 1999)

Personal information
- Full name: Ramsingh Sonu Yadav
- Born: 11 November 1999 (age 27); Gorakhpur, Uttar Pradesh, India
- Source: Cricinfo, 10 January 2021

Ramsingh Sonu Yadav (born 11 November 1999), known as Sonu Yadav, is an Indian cricketer.

== Early life ==
Sonu's family moved to Hosur, an industrial city in Tamil Nadu, in 2000 when he was 5 months old in quest of better employment possibilities. He attended Swamy Vivekananda Higher Sec School in Bagalur, Hosur where he completed his secondary education.

== Career ==
He made his Twenty20 debut on 10 January 2021, for Tamil Nadu in the 2020–21 Syed Mushtaq Ali Trophy. He made his List A debut on 20 February 2021, for Tamil Nadu in the 2020–21 Vijay Hazare Trophy.

He was bought by Royal Challengers Bangalore for IPL 2023 at price 20 Lakh Indian Rupees. He was bought by Nellai Royal Kings for TNPL.
