= Ganeshan Periyaswamy =

Indian cricketer (born 1994)

Personal information
- Born: 5 March 1994 (age 32)
- Batting: Right-handed
- Bowling: Right-arm medium
- Source: ESPNcricinfo, 8 November 2019

Ganeshan Periyaswamy (born 5 March 1994) is an Indian cricketer. He made his Twenty20 debut on 8 November 2019, for Tamil Nadu in the 2019–20 Syed Mushtaq Ali Trophy.
