= Krishnamachari Srinivasan =

Indian cricket umpire (born 1966)

Personal information
- Full name: Krishnamachari Srinivasan
- Born: 18 January 1966 (age 60); Chennai, Tamil Nadu, India
- Role: Umpire

Umpiring information
- WODIs umpired: 7 (2007–2021)
- WT20Is umpired: 2 (2021)
- Source: ESPNcricinfo, 25 February 2017

Krishnamachari Srinivasan (born 18 January 1966) is an Indian cricket umpire. He stood in twenty seven FC Cricket, twenty one List A and nine Twenty20 matches. Prior to being an umpire, he played four List A matches for Tamil Nadu.
