= Salem Cricket Foundation Stadium =

Indian cricket stadium

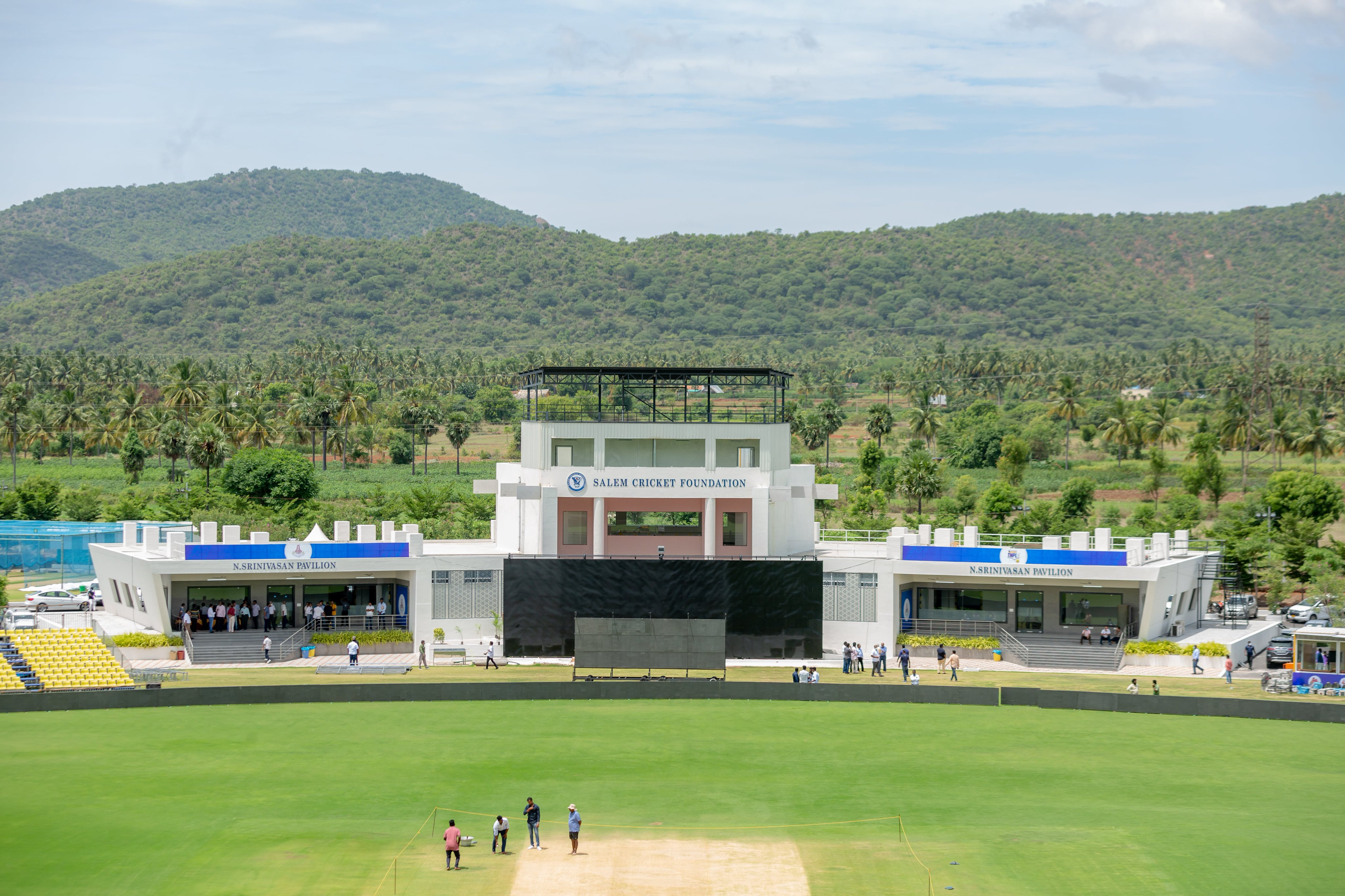
- Salem Cricket Foundation Stadium
- Interactive map of Salem Cricket Foundation Stadium
- Location: Salem, Tamil Nadu, India
- Coordinates: 11.646599°N 78.362975°E
- Owner: Salem Cricket Foundation
- Operator: Salem Cricket Foundation, Tamil Nadu Cricket Association
- Capacity: 5,000–25,000
- Surface: Grass
- Field shape: Circular
- Acreage: 16 Acres

Construction
- Groundbreaking: 2015
- Opened: February 10, 2020
- Cost: ₹3 crore (US$420,000)

Website
- salemdca.com
- Salem Stadium

Ground information
- Establishment: 2020
- Tenants: Tamil Nadu; Salem Spartans
- End names
- N Srinivasan Pavilion End

Team information
Tamil Nadu	(2020–present)
Salem Spartans (TNPL)	(2020–present)
- As of 13 February 2021; Source

Salem Cricket Foundation Stadium is a cricket stadium located in Salem district of Tamil Nadu, India. It was established in 2020 by Salem Cricket Foundation with assistance from Salem District Cricket Association and Tamil Nadu Cricket Association. It is the biggest cricket ground in the state with respect to playing area (90 metres (300 ft)). Chennai Super Kings started its Super Kings Academy in this stadium.

The stadium has five pitches, 12 practice-turf wickets, players pavilion and press box. It is also built with a drainage system which refills ground water periodically. The seating capacity is 5000 which can be increased to up to 25,000 during big events.

As of February 2020, construction of stands for audience and parking facilities were planned by the Salem Cricket Foundation and Tamil Nadu Cricket Association. The stadium is hosted Ranji Trophy, Tamil Nadu Premier League and All India Buchi Babu International Invitational Tournament and the stadium is expected to host Indian Premier League matches as per the officials soon.

== Tournaments ==
Salem Cricket Foundation Stadium hosting Tamil Nadu Premier League from 2022.In the 2022 edition, 7 league matches and 2 playoffs (qualifier 1 and eliminator) are held in this Stadium.

Stadium is also to host Duleep Trophy 2022 along with Chennai and Coimbatore, this stadium to host Semi-finals and recently Salem Cricket Foundation Stadium is set to host Tamil Nadu Cricket Association's All India Buchi Babu Invitation Tournament for Group C teams which has Mumbai, Delhi and Jammu and Kashmir, also to host Semifinals. Stadium also hosted the Ranji Trophy matches in 2024 between TamilNadu and Punjab cricket teams.

== Location ==
The stadium is located in Kattuveppilaipatti village, near Vazhapadi with Shevaroy hills in the backdrop. It is off the Chennai-Salem highway and nearly 25 km from Salem city. It is spread across 16 acres (6.5 ha) with a play area of 90 metres (300 ft) which makes it the biggest in the state.

== Inauguration ==
On 10 February 2020 after two years of construction, the stadium was inaugurated in the presence of Chief Minister Edappadi K. Palaniswami, former India captain Rahul Dravid, former Board of Control for Cricket in India Chairman N Srinivasan, Tamil Nadu Cricket Association President Rupa Gurunath and other officials. It was built at a cost of ₹3 crore (US$310,000).

== See also ==
- M. A. Chidhambaram Stadium
