= Chezhian Harinishanth =

Indian cricketer (born 1996)

Personal information
- Born: 16 August 1996 (age 30); Ooty, Tamil Nadu, India
- Batting: Left-handed
- Bowling: Right-arm off break
- Role: Batsman

Domestic team information
- Years: Team
- 2019–present: Tamil Nadu

Career statistics
| Competition | LA | T20 |
|---|---|---|
| Matches | 6 | 19 |
| Runs scored | 120 | 393 |
| Batting average | 20.00 | 26.20 |
| 100s/50s | 0/1 | 0/2 |
| Top score | 73 | 92* |
| Balls bowled | – | 11 |
| Wickets | – | 0 |
| Bowling average | – | – |
| 5 wickets in innings | – | – |
| 10 wickets in match | – | – |
| Best bowling | – | – |
| Catches/stumpings | 3/0 | 4/0 |
- Source: ESPNcricinfo, 11 October 2021

Chezhian Harinishanth (born 16 August 1996) is an Indian cricketer. He made his Twenty20 debut for Tamil Nadu in the 2018–19 Syed Mushtaq Ali Trophy on 21 February 2019. He made his List A debut on 24 September 2019, for Tamil Nadu in the 2019–20 Vijay Hazare Trophy. He made his first-class debut on 25 December 2019, for Tamil Nadu in the 2019–20 Ranji Trophy.

He was part of the 2021 Tamil Nadu team that won the Syed Mushtaq Ali Trophy contributing 246 runs at an average of 41 including an innings of 35 runs in the final. In February 2021, Harinishanth was bought by the Chennai Super Kings in the IPL auction ahead of the 2021 Indian Premier League. In February 2022, he was bought by the Chennai Super Kings in the auction for the 2022 Indian Premier League tournament.
