= Jagatheesan Kousik =

Indian cricketer

Personal information
- Born: 23 May 1995 (age 31); Coimbatore, Tamil Nadu, India
- Batting: Right-handed
- Bowling: Right-arm medium
- Role: All-rounder

Domestic team information
- Years: Team
- 2015–present: Tamil Nadu
- Source: ESPNcricinfo, 10 October 2015

Jagatheesan Kousik (born 23 May 1995) is an Indian cricketer who plays for Tamil Nadu in domestic cricket. He is an all-rounder who bats right-handed and bowls right arm medium pace.

== Early life ==
Kousik was born on 23 May 1995 in Coimbatore, Tamil Nadu, India. Kousik's family does not have a cricketing background. He started playing at the age of 10. He started playing for the Coimbatore District Cricket Association as a 10-year-old.

== Domestic cricket ==
Kousik has represented Tamil Nadu in age-group levels. He made his first class debut for the side on 1 October 2015 in the 2015–16 Ranji Trophy. He made his maiden first-class century in his second match, scoring 151 off 272 balls. He made his List A debut on 10 December 2015 in the 2015–16 Vijay Hazare Trophy. He made his Twenty20 debut on 2 January 2016 in the 2015–16 Syed Mushtaq Ali Trophy. He has represented Ruby Trichy Warriors and Siechem Madurai Panthers in Tamil Nadu Premier League (TNPL).

== Playing style ==
Kousik is rated as an all-rounder. He is an economic bowler who can swing the ball both ways.
