= Narayan Jagadeesan =

Indian cricketer

Personal information
- Born: 24 December 1995 (age 30); Coimbatore, Tamil Nadu, India
- Batting: Right-handed
- Role: Wicket-keeper

Domestic team information
- Years: Team
- 2016–present: Tamil Nadu
- 2020–2022: Chennai Super Kings
- 2023: Kolkata Knight Riders

Career statistics
Competition	FC	LA	T20
Matches	52	64	66
Runs scored	3,373	2,728	1,475
Batting average	47.50	46.23	31.38
100s/50s	10/14	9/9	0/10
Top score	321	277	88
Catches/stumpings	133/14	49/8	26/7
- Source: ESPNcricinfo, 15 March 2025

Narayan Jagadeesan (born 24 December 1995), colloquially referred to by his close friends and associates as Jaggi, is an Indian cricketer, who plays for Tamil Nadu in domestic cricket as a wicket-keeper batter.

== Domestic career ==
He made his first-class debut for Tamil Nadu in the 2016–17 Ranji Trophy on 27 October 2016, where he won the player of the match award. He made his Twenty20 debut for Tamil Nadu in the 2016–17 Inter State Twenty-20 Tournament on 30 January 2017. He made his List A debut for Tamil Nadu in the 2016–17 Vijay Hazare Trophy on 25 February 2017.

In January 2018, he was bought by the Chennai Super Kings in the 2018 IPL auction. Jagadeesan made his IPL debut with Chennai Super Kings on 10 October 2020 against Royal Challengers Bangalore.

In January 2021, he was the leading run-scorer in the 2020–21 Syed Mushtaq Ali Trophy, with 364 runs in eight matches. In February 2021, he was Tamil Nadu's leading run-scorer in the 2020–21 Vijay Hazare Trophy, with 217 runs including a century against Punjab.

In February 2022, he was again bought by the Chennai Super Kings in the auction for the 2022 Indian Premier League tournament.

On 21 November 2022, Narayan Jagadeesan scored 277 off 147 balls for Tamil Nadu against Arunachal Pradesh at the Chinnaswamy Stadium, breaking Ali Brown's record for the highest individual score in List A cricket. Jagadeesan became the first player to score centuries in five consecutive innings in men's List A cricket. Previously, three batters had four centuries in a row – Kumar Sangakkara in 2014–15, Alviro Petersen in 2015–16 and Devdutt Padikkal in 2020–21.

On 16 December 2022, he was bought by the Kolkata Knight Riders for the 2023 Indian Premier League tournament.

== International career ==
In July 2025, he had earned maiden call-up for India national team for the fifth Test match against England as a replacement of Rishabh Pant, who fractured his right foot while batting in the first innings in Manchester Test. He was also named in the Indian Team for the Test Series vs West Indies in India In a warm-up match against the United States on 2 February 2026 ahead of the 2026 ICC Men's T20 World Cup, Jagadeesan scored a sensational century for India A. His 104 off 55 powered India A to 38-run victory.
