= Murali Vijay =

Indian cricketer

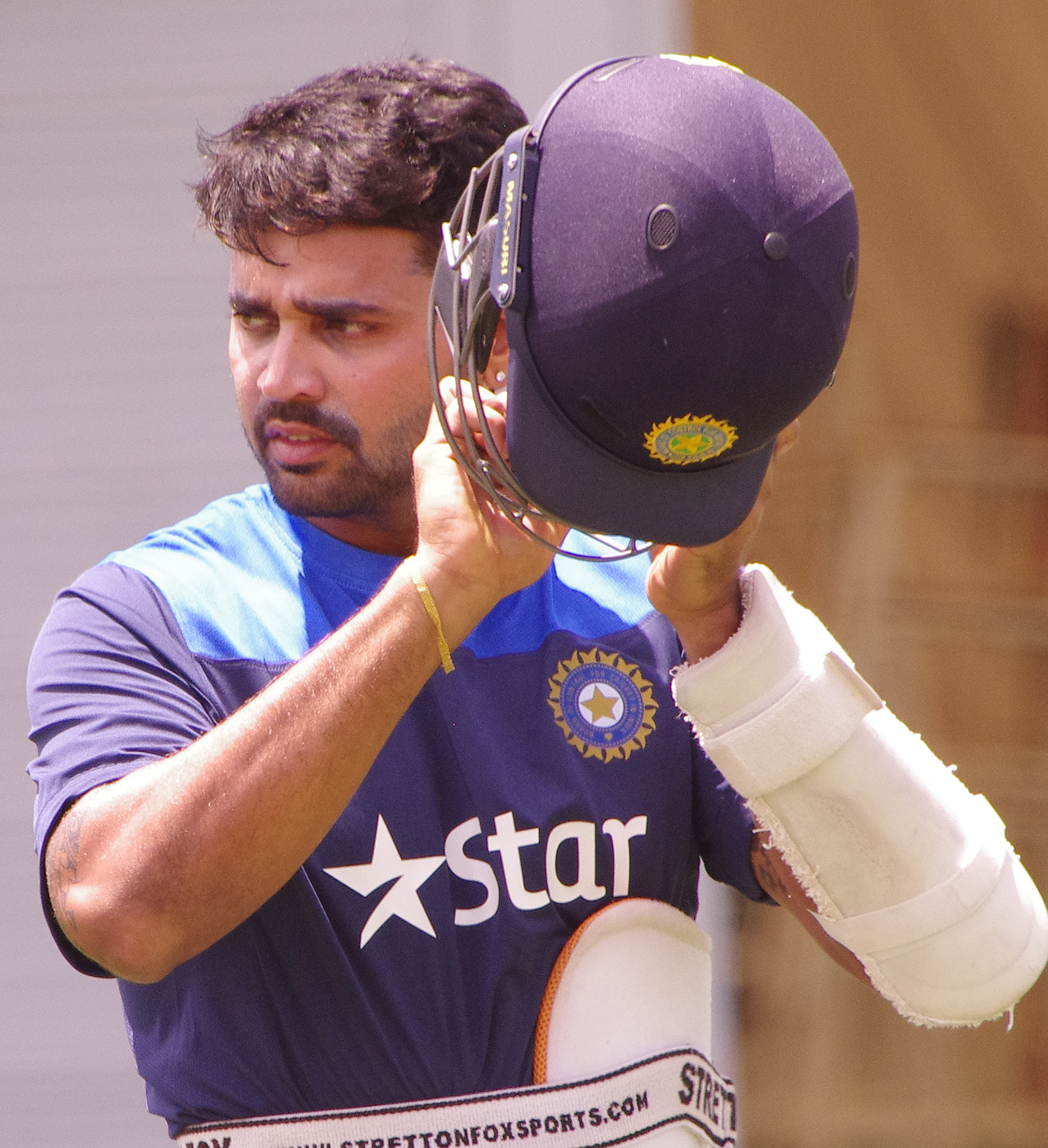
- Murali Vijay during a practice session with the Indian team

Personal information
- Born: 1 April 1984 (age 42); Madras, Tamil Nadu, India
- Nickname: Monk
- Batting: Right-handed
- Bowling: Right-arm off break
- Role: Opening batsman
- Relatives: Nikita Vanjara (Wife)

International information
- National side: India (2008–2018)
- Test debut (cap 260): 6 November 2008 v Australia
- Last Test: 14 December 2018 v Australia
- ODI debut (cap 181): 27 February 2010 v South Africa
- Last ODI: 9 July 2015 v Zimbabwe
- ODI shirt no.: 8
- T20I debut (cap 27): 1 May 2010 v Afghanistan
- Last T20I: 19 July 2015 v Zimbabwe
- T20I shirt no.: 8

Domestic team information
- Years: Team
- 2005–2019: Tamil Nadu
- 2008/09: Central Districts
- 2009–2013, 2018–2020: Chennai Super Kings (squad no. 8,1(from 2018 IPL))
- 2014: Delhi Daredevils (squad no. 8)
- 2015–2016: Kings XI Punjab (squad no. 8)
- 2018: Essex (squad no. 8)
- 2019: Somerset (squad no. 1)

Career statistics
Competition	Test	ODI	T20I	FC
Matches	61	17	9	135
Runs scored	3,982	339	169	9,205
Batting average	38.29	21.18	18.77	41.84
100s/50s	12/15	0/1	0/0	25/38
Top score	167	72	48	266
Balls bowled	354	36	12	1,073
Wickets	1	1	0	11
Bowling average	198.00	37.00	–	56.27
5 wickets in innings	0	0	0	0
10 wickets in match	0	–	–	0
Best bowling	1/12	1/19	–	3/46
Catches/stumpings	49/–	9/–	3/–	118/–
Medal record
Men's Cricket
Representing India
ICC Champions Trophy
Winner	2013 England and Wales
- Source: ESPNcricinfo, 5 October 2024

Murali Vijay (born 1 April 1984) is a former Indian international cricketer. He was a right-handed opening batter and an occasional right-arm off break bowler. He has represented the Indian cricket team and played for Tamil Nadu in domestic first-class cricket. He was a member of the Indian team that won the 2013 ICC Champions Trophy.

In 2001, Vijay started playing cricket at the college level before he was selected for the Tamil Nadu under-22 cricket team. He made his first-class debut for Tamil Nadu in 2006 and was amongst the top run-scorers in the 2006–07 Ranji Trophy, which was his maiden first-class tournament. In 2008, he was called up to the South Zone cricket team that played for the Duleep Trophy and later to the India A team that faced the touring New Zealand A team. He made his test debut against Australia in November 2008 when the team's regular opener Gautam Gambhir was not available. After a brief run in the team playing test cricket, he played his first ODI against the touring South African team in February 2010.

Vijay is noted as a good timer of the ball, who tends to play off his front foot and prefer his fore-arm wrists to play the shots. Known for his ability to bat for longer periods of time, he played mainly test cricket for India. After a start-stop initial few years, he became a regular in the Indian test teams after his call back to the team during the home series against Australia in 2013, in which he scored back to back centuries. He was one of the designated opening batsmen in the away tours, the highlight of which included the 2014 series against England in which he was the top run getter. Though he played his last ODI in 2015, he continued to play tests for India regularly. After a good series against England in early 2017, his returns diminished over the next two seasons and he played his last test in December 2018. He finished his career with 3982 runs in 61 test matches at an average of over 38 to go with the 331 runs he accumulated in 17 ODIs.

Vijay played for three franchises in the Indian Premier League (IPL) T20 cricket tournament. He represented the Chennai Super Kings (CSK) for seven season across two stints and in 2010 and 2011. He was also the top run scorer in the 2010 Champions League Twenty20, which was won by CSK. He had a short stint with Delhi Daredevils in 2014 before he was part of the Kings XI Punjab team for three seasons including the 2016 season as captain. He scored 2619 runs in 106 matches with two centuries in the IPL. He also captained the Kovai Kings team in the Tamil Nadu Premier League in 2016 and 2017. He announced his official retirement from all forms of cricket in January 2023. In a career spanning more than 20 years, he scored more than 13,000 runs in all forms of cricket.

== Early career ==
Vijay was born on 1 April 1984 in Madras, Tamil Nadu, to Murali and Lakshmi. He started playing college cricket at the age of 17 and was scouted by former Indian cricketer Bharat Arun. He was selected for the Tamil Nadu under-22 squad for the 2004–05 C. K. Nayudu Trophy. Vijay opened the innings and averaged 26.45 in six matches. He was again chosen to represent the under-22 squad for the 2005–06 C. K. Nayudu Trophy and averaged 26.50 across three matches. Based on his performances, Vijay was selected in the Tamil Nadu senior squad for the Ranji One-day Trophy in February 2006 and scored 17 runs in his senior cricket debut in the last group fixture of the tournament against Karnataka on 16 February. He scored 38 in his second match, which was a quarterfinal loss to the Railways.

Vijay made his first class debut for Tamil Nadu during the 2006–07 Ranji Trophy. He scored a fifty in his first-class debut against Delhi. He accumulated a total of 628 runs at an average of more than 52 including two centuries and finished as the third highest run getter of the tournament in his debut season. He continued his good form in the 2006–07 Ranji One-day Trophy and scored 277 runs in seven matches at an average of 39.57 with a high-score of 112.

Vijay played in all seven matches of Tamil Nadu in the 2007–08 Ranji Trophy and scored 582 runs at an average of more than 58. His season included two centuries including his high-score of 230* against Saurashtra. In the season, he was also involved in a 462 run partnership for the first wicket with Abhinav Mukund, which was two runs short of the Indian first class record of 464 runs. On the back of his performances in the Ranji Trophy, he was named in the South Zone squad that competed for the Duleep Trophy. In the debut match for the team against North Zone, he scored a duck in the first innings and 39 runs in the second. In the second game of the series against East Zone, he had a similar outing where he scored 46 in the first innings and registered a duck in the second while opening the batting. In the 2007–08 Vijay Hazare Trophy that followed, Vijay played seven matches in which he scored more than 300 runs with back-to-back hundreds against Hyderabad and Andhra.

In September 2008, Vijay was picked in the India A squad to play against the touring New Zealand A team in two four-day matches. He made 45 and 59 in the first match, helping the team win by 129 runs. He opened the innings and scored 98 runs in the second match, in which India lost. In October 2008, Vijay was named in the India Red team for the Challenger Trophy and finished second amongst the highest run-scorers of the tournament with 164 runs from three matches at an average of over 54.

== International career ==
=== Test debut ===
When Australia toured India in November 2008, Vijay received his maiden call-up to the Indian team for the fourth test of the Border–Gavaskar Trophy. He made his Test cricket debut at Nagpur after he was selected in place of the regular opener Gautam Gambhir, who had received a one match ban from International Cricket Council (ICC) for elbowing Shane Watson in the previous match of the series. He was playing in a Ranji trophy match at the time and was called mid-way to make his test debut. He made 33 and 41, contributing to opening stands of 98 and 116 respectively with Virender Sehwag. He also effected the run out of Matthew Hayden and Michael Hussey during Australia's innings and caught Brett Lee from the bowling of Harbhajan Singh to take his first catch in test cricket.

His defensive shots are so assured. And he looks comfortable of both front and back foot. And when he attacks, he doesn't go hard at the deliveries. I can see why this young man is playing.

— Former Australian captain Allan Border

Following his performance in his debut test, Vijay was selected for the Indian ODI squad for the first three matches against the touring England team in November 2008. He was not selected in the playing eleven and was dropped after the first three matches upon the return of Sachin Tendulkar. In December 2009, he played the third and final Test against Sri Lanka at Mumbai. He scored 87 runs in a 221 run partnership for the first wicket with Sehwag, which contributed to the Indian victory by an innings. Vijay was selected for the Bangladesh tour in January 2010 as a reserve batsman and made it to the playing eleven for the second test after V. V. S. Laxman got injured. Vijay scored 30 runs in the second test at Mirpur. He was selected for the two test home series against South Africa after Rahul Dravid was injured.

=== ODI debut and initial years ===
Vijay made his ODI debut in the third and final match against South Africa at Ahmedabad on 27 February 2010 and scored a moderate 25 runs off 16 balls. He made his full series debut during a tri-nations tournament in Zimbabwe but fared poorly scoring just 46 runs across three matches. Despite a poor series in Zimbabwe, his earlier performances were enough for him to be named in the Indian squad for the 2010 ICC World Twenty20. Vijay fared poorly scoring just 57 runs in four matches averaging below 15.

Vijay was selected as the reserve opener for away series against Sri Lanka in August 2010 and scored 99 runs across the two test matches he played. In October 2010, he scored his maiden test century when he scored 139 runs in the second test match of Australia's tour of India at Bangalore. Based on his performance in the test series, he was selected in the ODI team for New Zealand's tour of India and India's tour of South Africa. He again fared poorly in the ODIs, scoring only 100 runs across six matches. He played three test matches during the India's tour of West Indies in June 2011 but scored a meager 72 runs.

=== Comeback and test regular ===
"My main focus was on getting out of the habit of those scores of 30s and 40s because they really haunted me. I had a chat with my coach, Jaykumar, during which we came out with three points: shot selection, shot selection and shot selection. Nothing was wrong technically with my batting, it was only the shot selection that went wrong. Then it came down to fitness – whether I was throwing it away because I got tired? We worked on small aspects like that and it is paying dividends now."

— Vijay on his batting turnaround in 2014

Following poor returns in the last few series, Vijay was not selected to play for India till February 2013, when he was re-called to the team for the home series against Australia. He made back to back centuries in the second and third tests of the series and finished as the highest scorer with 430 runs including two centuries. Vijay was part of the Indian squad that won the 2013 ICC Champions Trophy but did not play a single match in the series. He played in an ODI match again only in July 2013 in the tri-series against West Indies and Sri Lanka scoring 57 runs across two matches.

After his performance against Australia, Vijay became a regular in the Indian test team and played consecutive away series against South Africa and New Zealand. He played all five tests during the tour of England in July 2014 and was the top scorer in the series with 402 runs. When India toured Australia in December 2014, Vijay scored 99 runs in a 185 run partnership with his skipper Virat Kohli. The Indian team fell short by 34 runs while chasing a 364 run target in the fourth innings at the Adelaide Oval. He scored 144 runs in the first innings of the second test in Brisbane which equaled the highest score by an Indian at the ground. He scored his sixth Test hundred in the one-match Test series against Bangladesh in June 2015 and scored 210 runs across four matches in the home test series against South Africa. He played his last ODI match in July 2015 against Zimbabwe.

=== Later years and retirement ===
In the home series against England, Vijay scored 357 runs in five tests including two centuries in an Indian series victory. He later played three tests in the home series against Australia but scored just 113 runs. In January 2018, he again fared poorly, scoring only 102 runs in three matches in the away series against South Africa. He scored his last test century in the lone test match against Afghanistan in June 2018. He played two tests in the Indian tour of England in August 2018 and scored only 26 runs with two ducks. Despite his poor performance in the series, there were calls from retired Indian cricketers for him to be part of the Indian tour of Australia after his performances for Essex in the English County Championship. He played his last test match in the series at Perth scoring a duck in the first innings and 20 runs in the second. He was later dropped from the Indian team and never made another appearance for the Indian team. He announced his official retirement from all forms of cricket in January 2023.

== T20 career ==
=== IPL ===
Vijay made his debut in the Indian Premier League for his home town franchise, Chennai Super Kings (CSK) in 2009. In the 2010 season, he was amongst the top five run getters after scoring 458 runs to lead CSK to a first title win. Vijay was the top run scorer in the 2010 Champions League Twenty20 with 294 runs while CSK won the title. He had another good season in the 2011 IPL, where he scored 434 runs in the second consecutive title win for CSK. Vijay scored more than 300 runs in each of the 2012 and 2013 seasons.

In the 2014 IPL auction, he was picked up by Delhi Daredevils. He played one season for Delhi scoring 207 runs. In February 2015, he was picked up by Kings XI Punjab and replaced South African David Miller as the captain of the team in the middle of the 2016 season. He was the top-scorer for the team in the 2016 season with 453 runs. He missed out the entire 2017 season due to a wrist injury and was released by Kings XI Punjab. In the 2018 IPL auction, he went back to Chennai Super Kings and played only six matches across the next three seasons. He finished with 2619 runs in 106 matches with two centuries in the IPL.

=== TNPL ===
Vijay captained the Kovai Kings team in the first two seasons of Tamil Nadu Premier League in 2016 and 2017. In 2022, he returned to play a short stint for Trichy Warriors in which he scored 224 runs across four matches.

== Playing style ==
Vijay is described as a stylish opening batsman. He is a good timer of the ball and tends to prefer his fore-arm wrists to play the shots. He prefers to play off his front foot. His technique has been compared to that of former Indian batsman VVS Laxman. He used an upright stance on the bouncy wickets outside India and adapted to play the ball late to counter the swing and seam movement. He has a good foot movement and is a better player of spin. He is known for his ability to bat for longer periods of time without losing concentration, fetching him the moniker "The Monk". He is known for scoring boundaries by hitting the ball in the air, over the infield and down the ground.

== Personal life ==
Vijay married Nikita Vanjara, who was earlier married to his Tamil Nadu teammate Dinesh Karthik. The couple have two sons and a daughter.
