= Tamil Nadu Cricket Association =

Cricket governing body in Tamil Nadu state, India

- Sport: Cricket
- Jurisdiction: Tamil Nadu
- Abbreviation: TNCA
- Founded: 1932
- Affiliation: Board of Control for Cricket in India
- Headquarters: M.A. Chidambaram Stadium
- Location: Chennai, Tamil Nadu, India
- President: T. J. Srinivasaraj
- Secretary: Shri R. I. Palani

Official website
- tnca.cricket
- (India)

The Tamil Nadu Cricket Association (TNCA) is the governing body of cricket in the Indian state of Tamil Nadu. It is affiliated with the Board of Control for Cricket in India and governs the Tamil Nadu cricket team. The TNCA is one of the permanent test centres of the BCCI.

== History ==
The board was formed when organized league cricket in the state began in Madras in 1932. It was formed after two rival bodies — the Indian Cricket Federation and Madras Cricket Club — merged, becoming the Madras Cricket Association (MCA). The MCA was formally constituted on April 30, 1935, shortly thereafter affiliating with the Board of Control for Cricket in India. The cricket association was to control representative cricket in the province.

By 1933, the association had first and second division leagues, with a third division added on the next season. By 1939, it had added a fourth division. In the 1967–68 season, the M.C.A. was renamed as the Tamil Nadu Cricket Association (TNCA). As of 2008, it had five divisions with a total of 132 teams.

== Division leagues ==
The Tamil Nadu Cricket Association conducts various league tournaments, including the age groups of U19, U22, and U25. It also conducts league championship for city affiliated clubs.

There are about 726 league matches played every year from first to fifth division. A zone consisting of 12 teams plays in the first and second division, whereas third, fourth, and fifth division consists of two, three, and four zones respectively. The city league where matches are played on a three-day duration follows the Ranji Trophy guidelines.

== Home ground ==
M A Chidambaram Stadium or Chepauk Stadium located in Chennai is the home ground. The stadium was established in 1916 and it is the oldest continuously used cricket stadium in the country. It is named after M A Chidambaram, former President of BCCI, the stadium was formerly known as Madras Cricket Club Ground.

It is the home ground of the Tamil Nadu cricket team and the Indian Premier League team Chennai Super Kings. The stadium is located at Chepauk, a few hundred meters from Marina Beach along the Bay of Bengal.

== Recent national players from TNCA ==
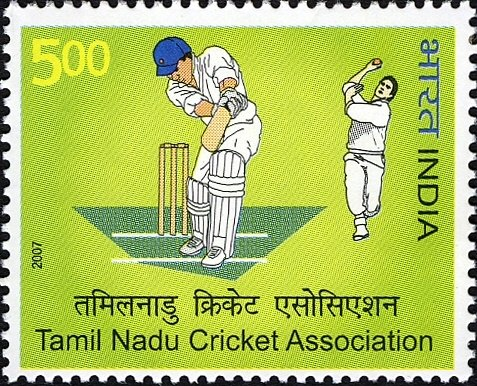
Tamil Naidu Cricket Association stamp - 2007

- Dinesh Karthik - wicket keeper batsman
- Murali Vijay - former opening batsman
- Ravichandran Ashwin - off-spin bowler
- T. Natarajan - fast bowler
- Washington Sundar - all rounder
- Abhinav Mukund - former batsman
- Vijay Shankar - all rounder
- Varun Chakravarthy - spin bowler
- Sai Sudharsan - batsman

== Premier League ==
TNCA inaugurated its regional Twenty20 Tamil Nadu Premier League in August 2016. The inaugural edition featured eight teams, playing a total of 31 matches (28 league matches, two semi-finals and the final). Chennai, Dindigul (Natham) and Tirunelveli were the venues. Two new venues in Coimbatore and Salem were added in 2020. Albert Tuti Patriots won the inaugural edition of the league after beating Chepauk Super Gillies by 122 runs.

== See also ==
- M. A. Chidambaram Stadium
- Tamil Nadu cricket team
- Salem Cricket Foundation Stadium
