= 1962–63 Duleep Trophy =

- Dates: 31 December 1962 – 27 January 1963
- Administrator(s): BCCI
- Cricket format: First-class cricket
- Tournament format(s): Knockout
- Champions: West Zone (2nd title)
- Participants: 5
- Matches: 4
- Most runs: Akash Lal (NZ) (232)
- Most wickets: Baloo Gupte (WZ) (17)

The 1962–63 Duleep Trophy was the second season of the Duleep Trophy, a first-class cricket tournament contested by five zonal teams of India: Central Zone, East Zone, North Zone, South Zone and West Zone.

West Zone won the title, defeating South Zone in the final.

== Results ==
Quarterfinal
East Zone
North Zone | W

Semifinals
North Zone
West Zone | FIL
South Zone | C
Central Zone

Final
West Zone | W
South Zone

=== Final ===
24–27 January 1963
Scorecard

| South Zone | v | West Zone |
| 132 (44.6 overs); P. K. Belliappa 48; Baloo Gupte 9/55 | | 415/8 dec (77.7 overs); Sudhakar Adhikari 103; Polly Umrigar 103; M. L. Jaisimha 5/76 |
| 263 (85.6 overs); Abbas Ali Baig 76; Baloo Gupte 3/72 |

West Zone won by an innings and 20 runs
Eden Gardens, Calcutta

- South Zone won the toss and elected to bat.
