= Tarun Kumar (cricketer) =

Indian cricketer (born 1974)

Personal information
- Full name: Tarun Kumar
- Born: 28 December 1974 (age 51); Yarpur, Nalanda, Bihar, India
- Batting: Right-handed
- Bowling: Right-arm medium

Domestic team information
- Years: Team
- 1992–2002: Bihar

Career statistics
Competition	First-class	List A
Matches	22	19
Runs scored	827	428
Batting average	27.56	23.77
100s/50s	2/2	0/2
Top score	100*	81
Balls bowled	6	–
Wickets	0	–
Bowling average	–	–
5 wickets in innings	0	–
10 wickets in match	0	n/a
Best bowling	–	–
Catches/stumpings	6/–	1/–
- Source: Cricinfo, 20 April 2020

Tarun Kumar (born 28 December 1974) is a former Indian cricketer. Kumar was a right-handed batsman who bowled right-arm medium. He was born in Yarpur, Bihar.

Kumar made his first-class debut for Bihar in the 1992–93 Ranji Trophy against Tripura. He played a further 16 matches for the state from 1992 to 2002. He also represented East Zone in five match in the during the 1993–94 and 1994–95 Duleep Trophy. Across the 22 matches he scored 2 centuries and averaged 27.56 with the bat.

He played also played List A cricket for the state and zone from 1993 to 1997. Debuting for the East Zone in the 1993–94 Deodhar Trophy against Central Zone he played six matches for the region. In the Ranji One-Day Trophy he played 13 matches for Bihar. With a top score of 81, he finished with an average 23.77 from the 19 matches.
