= 1971–72 Duleep Trophy =

- Dates: 11 February 1972 – 14 March 1972
- Administrator(s): BCCI
- Cricket format: First-class cricket
- Tournament format(s): Knockout
- Champions: Central Zone (1st title)
- Participants: 5
- Matches: 4
- Most runs: Salim Durani (CZ) (237)
- Most wickets: Salim Durani (CZ) (22)

The 1971–72 Duleep Trophy was the 11th season of the Duleep Trophy, a first-class cricket tournament contested by five zonal teams of India: Central Zone, East Zone, North Zone, South Zone and West Zone.

Central Zone won the title, defeating West Zone in the final.

== Results ==
Quarterfinal
Central Zone	W
North Zone

Semifinals
South Zone
Central Zone	W
East Zone
West Zone	FIL

Final
Central Zone	W
West Zone

=== Final ===
11–14 March 1972
Scorecard

West Zone	v	Central Zone
279 (101.5 overs); Hemant Kanitkar 57; Salim Durani 6/44		200 (83.3 overs); Ashok Jagdale 59; Eknath Solkar 6/59
195 (63.5 overs); Hemant Kanitkar 47; Parthasarathy Sharma 4/38		277/8 (111.2 overs); Salim Durani 83*; Eknath Solkar 3/63

Central Zone won by 2 wickets
Central College Ground, Bangalore

- West Zone won the toss and elected to bat.
