= 1979–80 Duleep Trophy =

- Dates: 7 December 1979 – 23 January 1980
- Administrator(s): BCCI
- Cricket format: First-class cricket
- Tournament format(s): Knockout
- Champions: North Zone (3rd title)
- Participants: 5
- Matches: 4
- Most runs: Brijesh Patel (SZ) (228)
- Most wickets: Madan Lal (NZ) (12)

The 1979–80 Duleep Trophy was the 19th season of the Duleep Trophy, a first-class cricket tournament contested by five zonal teams of India: Central Zone, East Zone, North Zone, South Zone and West Zone.

North Zone won the title, defeating West Zone in the final.

== Results ==
Quarterfinal
East Zone
South Zone | FIL

Semifinals
South Zone
West Zone | W
Central Zone
North Zone | W

Final
West Zone
North Zone | W

=== Final ===
20–23 January 1980
Scorecard

| North Zone | v | West Zone |
| 165 (65 overs); Rakesh Shukla 41; Yajurvindra Singh 4/32 | | 271 (66.5 overs); Anshuman Gaekwad 56; Madan Lal 4/81 |
| 345/7 dec (119 overs); Madan Lal 143*; Naresh Parsana 3/86 | | 135 (35.5 overs); Zulfiqar Parkar 28; Madan Lal 4/61 |

North Zone won by 104 runs
Wankhede Stadium, Bombay

- North Zone won the toss and elected to bat.
