= 1974–75 Duleep Trophy =

- Dates: 27 September 1974 – 20 October 1974
- Administrator(s): BCCI
- Cricket format: First-class cricket
- Tournament format(s): Knockout
- Champions: South Zone (6th title)
- Participants: 5
- Matches: 4
- Most runs: Hemant Kanitkar (WZ) (147)
- Most wickets: Padmakar Shivalkar (WZ) (17)

The 1974–75 Duleep Trophy was the 14th season of the Duleep Trophy, a first-class cricket tournament contested by five zonal teams of India: Central Zone, East Zone, North Zone, South Zone and West Zone.

South Zone won the title, defeating West Zone in the final.

== Results ==
Quarterfinal
West Zone	FIL
East Zone

Semifinals
Central Zone
West Zone	W
South Zone	W
North Zone

Final
West Zone
South Zone	W

=== Final ===
18–20 October 1974
Scorecard

West Zone	v	South Zone
102 (53.4 overs); Sudhir Naik 30; E. A. S. Prasanna 5/35		231 (101 overs); Syed Abid Ali 82; Dhiraj Parsana 3/49
147 (49.3 overs); Sudhir Naik 46; S. Venkataraghavan 6/26		19/1 (6 overs); V. S. Vijay Kumar 12; Padmakar Shivalkar 1/11

South Zone won by 9 wickets
Lal Bahadur Shastri Stadium, Hyderabad

- South Zone won the toss and elected to field.
