= 1964–65 Duleep Trophy =

- Dates: 24 October 1964 – 15 February 1965
- Administrator(s): BCCI
- Cricket format: First-class cricket
- Tournament format(s): Knockout
- Champions: West Zone (4th title)
- Participants: 5
- Matches: 4
- Most runs: Salim Durani (CZ) (271)
- Most wickets: Baloo Gupte (WZ) (12)

The 1964–65 Duleep Trophy was the fourth season of the Duleep Trophy, a first-class cricket tournament contested by five zonal teams of India: Central Zone, East Zone, North Zone, South Zone and West Zone.

West Zone won the title, defeating Central Zone in the final.

== Results ==
Quarterfinal
North Zone
Central Zone	FIL

Semifinals
South Zone
Central Zone	FIL
East Zone
West Zone	FIL

Final
Central Zone
West Zone	W

=== Final ===
13–15 February 1965
Scorecard

West Zone	v	Central Zone
555 (119.4 overs); Farokh Engineer 142; Anand Shukla 3/76		135 (53 overs); Salim Durani 42; Bapu Nadkarni 5/16
		331 (85.2 overs); Salim Durani 119; Baloo Gupte 5/67

West Zone won by an innings and 89 runs
Brabourne Stadium, Bombay

- Central Zone won the toss and elected to field.
