= 1998–99 Duleep Trophy =

- Dates: 1 December 1998 – 21 December 1998
- Administrator(s): BCCI
- Cricket format: First-class cricket
- Tournament format(s): Knockout
- Champions: Central Zone (4th title)
- Participants: 5
- Matches: 4
- Most runs: Vikram Rathour (NZ) (217)
- Most wickets: Murali Kartik (CZ) (11)

The 1998–99 Duleep Trophy was the 38th season of the Duleep Trophy, a first-class cricket tournament contested by five zonal teams of India: Central Zone, East Zone, North Zone, South Zone and West Zone.

Central Zone won the title, defeating West Zone in the final.

== Results ==
Quarterfinal
North Zone	W
South Zone

Semifinals
Central Zone	W
North Zone
West Zone	FIL
East Zone

Final
Central Zone	W
West Zone

=== Final ===
17–21 December 1998
Scorecard

Central Zone	v	West Zone
344 (123.4 overs); Manoj Mudgal 81; Shitanshu Kotak 2/12		281 (116.2 overs); Hrishikesh Kanitkar 98; Murali Kartik 5/73
203 (88.2 overs); Gagan Khoda 107; Shitanshu Kotak 4/41		144 (72.2 overs); Shitanshu Kotak 26; Ashish Zaidi 4/44

Central Zone won by 122 runs
N2 Stadium, Aurangabad

- Central Zone won the toss and elected to bat.
