= 1963–64 Duleep Trophy =

Cricket tournament in India

- Dates: 7 December 1963 – 30 December 1963
- Administrator(s): BCCI
- Cricket format: First-class cricket
- Tournament format(s): Knockout
- Champions: shared by West Zone (3rd title) and South Zone (1st title)
- Participants: 5
- Matches: 4
- Most runs: Mansoor Ali Khan Pataudi (NZ) (202)
- Most wickets: Baloo Gupte (WZ) (7)

The 1963–64 Duleep Trophy was the third season of the Duleep Trophy, a first-class cricket tournament contested by five zonal teams of India: Central Zone, East Zone, North Zone, South Zone and West Zone.

The title was shared by West Zone and South Zone.

== Results ==
Quarterfinal
East Zone	FIL
Central Zone

Semifinals
West Zone	W
East Zone
North Zone
South Zone	FIL

Final
West Zone
South Zone

=== Final ===
27–30 December 1963
Scorecard

South Zone	v	West Zone
331 (163 overs); A. G. Milkha Singh 95; Ramakant Desai 5/63		47/0 (13.4 overs); Sudhakar Adhikari 31*

Match drawn; Trophy shared
Feroz Shah Kotla Ground, Delhi

- South Zone won the toss and elected to bat.
