= 1982–83 Duleep Trophy =

- Dates: 2 October 1982 – 17 October 1982
- Administrator(s): BCCI
- Cricket format: First-class cricket
- Tournament format(s): Knockout
- Champions: North Zone (4th title)
- Participants: 5
- Matches: 4
- Most runs: Mohinder Amarnath (NZ) (358)
- Most wickets: Maninder Singh (NZ) (18)

The 1982–83 Duleep Trophy was the 22nd season of the Duleep Trophy, a first-class cricket tournament contested by five zonal teams of India: Central Zone, East Zone, North Zone, South Zone and West Zone.

North Zone won the title, defeating West Zone in the final.

== Results ==
Quarterfinal
Central Zone
North Zone	W

Semifinals
East Zone
North Zone	W
West Zone	FIL
South Zone

Final
North Zone	W
West Zone

=== Final ===
14–17 October 1982
Scorecard

West Zone	v	North Zone
168 (70.2 overs); Ashok Mankad 44; Madan Lal 6/59		329 (140.3 overs); Yashpal Sharma 83; Ravi Shastri 7/105
330 (96.5 overs); Anshuman Gaekwad 104; Madan Lal 5/63		170/2 (65 overs); Mohinder Amarnath 67*; Ravi Shastri 2/37

North Zone won by 8 wickets
Wankhede Stadium, Bombay

- West Zone won the toss and elected to bat.
