= 1966–67 Duleep Trophy =

- Dates: 21 October 1966 – 21 November 1966
- Administrator(s): BCCI
- Cricket format: First-class cricket
- Tournament format(s): Knockout
- Champions: South Zone (3rd title)
- Participants: 5
- Matches: 4
- Most runs: Bal Dani (NZ) (330)
- Most wickets: B. S. Chandrasekhar (SZ) (12)

The 1966–67 Duleep Trophy was the sixth season of the Duleep Trophy, a first-class cricket tournament contested by five zonal teams of India: Central Zone, East Zone, North Zone, South Zone and West Zone.

South Zone won the final against West Zone on first innings lead.

== Results ==
Quarterfinal
North Zone | FIL
East Zone

Semifinals
North Zone
South Zone | FIL
Central Zone
West Zone | W

Final
South Zone | FIL
West Zone

=== Final ===
18–21 November 1966
Scorecard

| South Zone | v | West Zone |
| 470 (172 overs); M. L. Jaisimha 171; Ramakant Desai 3/76 | | 402 (138.1 overs); Ajit Wadekar 103; S. Venkataraghavan 5/95 |
| 138/5 dec (43.1 overs); P. K. Belliappa 46; Ashok Joshi 2/17 | | 63/1 (21 overs); Ajit Wadekar 36*; Venkataraman Subramanya 1/32 |

Match drawn; South Zone won on first innings lead
Brabourne Stadium, Bombay

- South Zone won the toss and elected to bat.
