= 2005–06 Duleep Trophy =

- Dates: 20 October 2005 – 14 November 2005
- Administrator: BCCI
- Cricket format: First-class cricket
- Tournament format(s): Round-robin and knockout
- Champions: West Zone (16th title)
- Participants: 6
- Matches: 7
- Most runs: Wasim Jaffer (WZ) (309)
- Most wickets: Zaheer Khan (WZ) (23)

The 2005–06 Duleep Trophy was the 45th season of the Duleep Trophy, a first-class cricket tournament contested by five zonal teams of India: Central Zone, East Zone, North Zone, South Zone and West Zone. In addition to these five teams, a guest team (Zimbabwe Cricket Union President's XI) also featured in the tournament.

West Zone won the title, defeating East Zone in the final.

== Results ==
=== Group stage ===
Source: Duleep Trophy, 2005–06. CricketArchive. Retrieved 28 November 2023. (subscription required).

Group A results

- South Zone v West Zone (20–23 October). West Zone (4pts) beat South Zone (0pts) by 7 wickets.
- Central Zone v South Zone (27–30 October). Central Zone (4pts) beat South Zone (0pts) by 8 wickets.
- Central Zone v West Zone (4–7 November). West Zone (4pts) beat Central Zone (0pts) by 7 wickets.

Group A points table

Team	Matches	Won	Lost	Drawn (WF)	Drawn (LF)	No result	Points	Quotient
West Zone	2	2	0	0	0	0	8	1.548
Central Zone	2	1	1	0	0	0	4	1.031
South Zone	2	0	2	0	0	0	0	0.622

Group A results

- East Zone v North Zone (20–23 October). East Zone (4pts) beat North Zone (0pts) by 9 wickets.
- North Zone v Zimbabwe A (27–30 October). North Zone (5pts) beat Zimbabwe A (0pts) by an innings and 7 runs.
- East Zone v Zimbabwe A (4–7 November). East Zone (5pts) beat Zimbabwe A (0pts) by an innings and 17 runs.

Group B points table

Team	Matches	Won	Lost	Drawn (WF)	Drawn (LF)	No result	Points	Quotient
East Zone	2	2	0	0	0	0	9	2.047
North Zone	2	1	1	0	0	0	5	1.041
ZCU President's XI	2	0	2	0	0	0	0	0.459

=== Final ===
12–14 November 2005
Scorecard

East Zone	v	West Zone
150 (55.3 overs); Arindam Das 56; Sairaj Bahutule 3/27		157 (64 overs); Parthiv Patel 43; Saurasish Lahiri 4/35
181 (59.1 overs); Laxmi Ratan Shukla 66; Zaheer Khan 4/41		175/5 (58.3 overs); Jacob Martin 52*; Shib Paul 2/38

West Zone won by 5 wickets
Sardar Patel Stadium, Ahmedabad

- East Zone won the toss and elected to bat.
