= 1977–78 Duleep Trophy =

- Dates: 23 September 1977 – 12 October 1977
- Administrator(s): BCCI
- Cricket format: First-class cricket
- Tournament format(s): Knockout
- Champions: West Zone (9th title)
- Participants: 5
- Matches: 4
- Most runs: Dilip Vengsarkar (WZ) (345)
- Most wickets: Hyder Ali (CZ) (12)

The 1977–78 Duleep Trophy was the 17th season of the Duleep Trophy, a first-class cricket tournament contested by five zonal teams of India: Central Zone, East Zone, North Zone, South Zone and West Zone.

West Zone won the final against North Zone on first innings lead.

== Results ==
Quarterfinal
Central Zone	W
East Zone

Semifinals
West Zone	FIL
Central Zone
South Zone
North Zone	FIL

Final
West Zone	FIL
North Zone

=== Final ===
9–12 October 1977
Scorecard

West Zone	v	North Zone
482/8 dec (187.5 overs); Dilip Vengsarkar 137; Chetan Chauhan 3/67		324 (142.4 overs); Chetan Chauhan 128; Dhiraj Parsana 5/80
121/6 dec (38 overs); Yajurvindra Singh 52*; Rajinder Goel 2/23		77/0 (28 overs); Mohinder Amarnath 44*

Match drawn; West Zone won on first innings lead
Wankhede Stadium, Bombay

- North Zone won the toss and elected to field.
