= 1967–68 Duleep Trophy =

- Dates: 6 October 1967 – 31 October 1967
- Administrator(s): BCCI
- Cricket format: First-class cricket
- Tournament format(s): Knockout
- Champions: South Zone (4th title)
- Participants: 5
- Matches: 4
- Most runs: Akash Lal (NZ) (233)
- Most wickets: Dipankar Sarkar (EZ) (8)

The 1967–68 Duleep Trophy was the seventh season of the Duleep Trophy, a first-class cricket tournament contested by five zonal teams of India: Central Zone, East Zone, North Zone, South Zone and West Zone.

South Zone won the final against West Zone on first innings lead.

== Results ==
Quarterfinal
North Zone	FIL
East Zone

Semifinals
West Zone	FIL
North Zone
South Zone	FIL
Central Zone

Final
West Zone
South Zone	FIL

=== Final ===
28–31 November 1967
Scorecard

West Zone	v	South Zone
423 (160.3 overs); Nari Contractor 130; B. S. Chandrasekhar 4/83		440/7 dec (180.1 overs); Mansoor Ali Khan Pataudi 200; Rusi Surti 2/76
100/6 (34 overs); Ashok Mankad 33; Syed Abid Ali 4/31

Match drawn; South Zone won on first innings lead
Brabourne Stadium, Bombay

- West Zone won the toss and elected to bat.
