= 1997–98 Duleep Trophy =

- Dates: 1 December 1997 – 21 December 1997
- Administrator(s): BCCI
- Cricket format: First-class cricket
- Tournament format(s): Knockout
- Champions: shared by Central Zone (3rd title) and West Zone (14th title)
- Participants: 5
- Matches: 4
- Most runs: Devang Gandhi (EZ) (206)
- Most wickets: Utpal Chatterjee (EZ) (10)

The 1997–98 Duleep Trophy was the 37th season of the Duleep Trophy, a first-class cricket tournament contested by five zonal teams of India: Central Zone, East Zone, North Zone, South Zone and West Zone.

The title was shared by Central Zone and West Zone.

== Results ==
Quarterfinal
East Zone	W
North Zone

Semifinals
East Zone
Central Zone	RPW
South Zone
West Zone	FIL

Final
Central Zone
West Zone

=== Final ===
17–21 December 1997
Scorecard

West Zone	v	Central Zone
384/7 dec (149 overs); Jacob Martin 72; Zakir Hussain 2/48		36/5 (22 overs); Rizwan Shamshad 11*; Nilesh Kulkarni 2/4

Match drawn; Trophy shared
M. A. Chidambaram Stadium, Chennai

- West Zone won the toss and elected to bat.
