= 1961–62 Duleep Trophy =

- Dates: 30 September 1961 – 23 October 1961
- Administrator(s): BCCI
- Cricket format: First-class cricket
- Tournament format(s): Knockout
- Champions: West Zone (1st title)
- Participants: 5
- Matches: 4
- Most runs: Salim Durani (CZ) (244)
- Most wickets: Ramakant Desai (WZ) (10)

The 1961–62 Duleep Trophy was the first season of the Duleep Trophy, a first-class cricket tournament contested by five zonal teams of India: Central Zone, East Zone, North Zone, South Zone and West Zone.

West Zone won the title, defeating South Zone in the final.

== Results ==
Quarterfinal
Central Zone	C
East Zone

Semifinals
West Zone	W
Central Zone
South Zone	W
North Zone

Final
West Zone	W
South Zone

=== Final ===
20–23 October 1961
Scorecard

South Zone	v	West Zone
175 (58.6 overs); A. G. Kripal Singh 73; Polly Umrigar 6/52		234/9 dec (80.5 overs); Chandu Borde 82*; A. G. Kripal Singh 4/66
139 (59.5 overs); U. Prabhakar Rao 48*; Gulabrai Ramchand 4/18		82/0 (14 overs); Nari Contractor 44*

West Zone won by 10 wickets
Brabourne Stadium, Bombay

- South Zone won the toss and elected to bat.
