= 1970–71 Duleep Trophy =

- Dates: 25 December 1970 – 12 January 1971
- Administrator(s): BCCI
- Cricket format: First-class cricket
- Tournament format(s): Knockout
- Champions: South Zone (5th title)
- Participants: 5
- Matches: 4
- Most runs: M. L. Jaisimha (SZ) (333)
- Most wickets: Devraj Govindraj (SZ) (10)

The 1970–71 Duleep Trophy was the 10th season of the Duleep Trophy, a first-class cricket tournament contested by five zonal teams of India: Central Zone, East Zone, North Zone, South Zone and West Zone.

South Zone won the title, defeating East Zone in the final.

== Results ==
Quarterfinal
South Zone	FIL
Central Zone

Semifinals
West Zone
South Zone	FIL
East Zone	FIL
North Zone

Final
South Zone	W
East Zone

=== Final ===
9–12 January 1971
Scorecard

East Zone	v	South Zone
382 (116.4 overs); Gopal Bose 113; Devraj Govindraj 5/114		451 (127.3 overs); M. L. Jaisimha 131; Sushil Sanghvi 3/104
130 (43.2 overs); Anand Shukla 44; Devraj Govindraj 3/40		62/0 (18.1 overs); P. K. Belliappa 38*

South Zone won by 10 wickets
Brabourne Stadium, Bombay

- East Zone won the toss and elected to bat.
