= 1976–77 Duleep Trophy =

- Dates: 22 October 1976 – 7 November 1976
- Administrator(s): BCCI
- Cricket format: First-class cricket
- Tournament format(s): Knockout
- Champions: West Zone (8th title)
- Participants: 5
- Matches: 4
- Most runs: Sunil Gavaskar (WZ) (356)
- Most wickets: Padmakar Shivalkar (WZ) (20)

The 1976–77 Duleep Trophy was the 16th season of the Duleep Trophy, a first-class cricket tournament contested by five zonal teams of India: Central Zone, East Zone, North Zone, South Zone and West Zone.

West Zone won the title, defeating North Zone in the final.

== Results ==
Quarterfinal
West Zone | W
East Zone

Semifinals
West Zone | FIL
South Zone
North Zone | FIL
Central Zone

Final
West Zone | W
North Zone

=== Final ===
4–7 November 1976
Scorecard

| North Zone | v | West Zone |
| 175 (75.3 overs); Vinay Lamba 37; Padmakar Shivalkar 4/45 | | 327 (127.5 overs); Yajurvindra Singh 93; Rajinder Goel 4/43 |
| 182 (74.2 overs); Venkat Sunderam 67; Padmakar Shivalkar 4/54 | | 32/1 (10.1 overs); Sunil Gavaskar 16; Rajinder Goel 1/6 |

West Zone won by 9 wickets
Moti Bagh Stadium, Vadodara

- North Zone won the toss and elected to bat.
