= 1965–66 Duleep Trophy =

- Dates: 23 October 1965 – 26 December 1965
- Administrator(s): BCCI
- Cricket format: First-class cricket
- Tournament format(s): Knockout
- Champions: South Zone (2nd title)
- Participants: 5
- Matches: 4
- Most runs: Abbas Ali Baig (SZ) (302)
- Most wickets: B. S. Chandrasekhar (SZ) (16)

The 1965–66 Duleep Trophy was the fifth season of the Duleep Trophy, a first-class cricket tournament contested by five zonal teams of India: Central Zone, East Zone, North Zone, South Zone and West Zone.

South Zone won the title, defeating Central Zone in the final.

== Results ==
Quarterfinal
South Zone	FIL
North Zone

Semifinals
South Zone	FIL
West Zone
East Zone
Central Zone	FIL

Final
South Zone	W
Central Zone

=== Final ===
25–26 December 1965
Scorecard

Central Zone	v	South Zone
123 (58 overs); Salim Durani 36; E. A. S. Prasanna 6/19		310 (78.3 overs); Budhi Kunderan 100; Salim Durani 5/120
167 (50.4 overs); Salim Durani 40; B. S. Chandrasekhar 5/39

South Zone won by an innings and 20 runs
Madras Cricket Club Ground, Madras

- Central Zone won the toss and elected to bat.
