= 1968–69 Duleep Trophy =

- Dates: 17 January 1969 – 3 March 1969
- Administrator(s): BCCI
- Cricket format: First-class cricket
- Tournament format(s): Knockout
- Champions: West Zone (5th title)
- Participants: 5
- Matches: 4
- Most runs: Ajit Wadekar (WZ) (212)
- Most wickets: Ajit Pai (WZ) (10)

The 1968–69 Duleep Trophy was the eighth season of the Duleep Trophy, a first-class cricket tournament contested by five zonal teams of India: Central Zone, East Zone, North Zone, South Zone and West Zone.

West Zone won the final against South Zone on first innings lead.

== Results ==
Quarterfinal
North Zone	FIL
Central Zone

Semifinals
West Zone	FIL
North Zone
East Zone
South Zone	W

Final
West Zone	FIL
South Zone

=== Final ===
28 February–3 March 1969
Scorecard

West Zone	v	South Zone
333 (151.4 overs); Chetan Chauhan 103; E. A. S. Prasanna 4/85		251 (113 overs); Abbas Ali Baig 49; Ajit Pai 6/93
388/7 dec (104.5 overs); Ajit Wadekar 144; Venkataraman Subramanya 2/35		143/4 (33 overs); Gundappa Viswanath 76*; Chetan Chauhan 3/39

Match drawn; West Zone won on first innings lead
Lal Bahadur Shastri Stadium, Hyderabad

- West Zone won the toss and elected to bat.
