= 1992–93 Duleep Trophy =

- Dates: 21 August 1992 – 13 September 1992
- Administrator(s): BCCI
- Cricket format: First-class cricket
- Tournament format(s): Knockout
- Champions: North Zone (10th title)
- Participants: 5
- Matches: 4
- Most runs: Mohammad Azharuddin (SZ) (195)
- Most wickets: Venkatapathy Raju (SZ) (17)

The 1992–93 Duleep Trophy was the 32nd season of the Duleep Trophy, a first-class cricket tournament contested by five zonal teams of India: Central Zone, East Zone, North Zone, South Zone and West Zone.

North Zone won the final against Central Zone on first innings lead.

== Results ==
Quarterfinal
South Zone	W
East Zone

Semifinals
South Zone
North Zone	W
Central Zone	W
West Zone

Final
North Zone	FIL
Central Zone

=== Final ===
9–13 September 1992
Scorecard

North Zone	v	Central Zone
268 (120.1 overs); Ajay Sharma 50; Sanjeev Sharma 5/66		97 (32 overs); Pritam Gandhe 24; Chetan Sharma 3/24
147/5 (49 overs); Ajay Jadeja 40; Sanjeev Sharma 3/33

Match drawn; North Zone won on first innings lead
Lal Bahadur Shastri Stadium, Hyderabad

- Central Zone won the toss and elected to field.
