= 2001–02 Duleep Trophy =

- Dates: 12 March 2002 – 12 April 2002
- Administrator: BCCI
- Cricket format: First-class cricket
- Tournament format: Round-robin
- Champions: West Zone (15th title)
- Participants: 5
- Matches: 10
- Most runs: Sridharan Sriram (SZ) (521)
- Most wickets: Irfan Pathan (WZ) (22)

The 2001–02 Duleep Trophy was the 41st season of the Duleep Trophy, a first-class cricket tournament contested by five zonal teams of India: Central Zone, East Zone, North Zone, South Zone and West Zone.

West Zone won the title by finishing first on the points table.

== Points table ==
Team	Matches	Won	Lost	Drawn (WF)	Drawn (LF)	Points	Quotient
West Zone	4	2	0	2	0	26	1.744
North Zone	4	1	1	2	0	18	1.322
East Zone	4	1	0	0	3	17	0.735
South Zone	4	0	1	1	2	11	0.851
Central Zone	4	1	3	0	0	8	0.707
