= Ajay Mehra =

Indian cricketer and sports commentator

Personal information
- Full name: Ajay Mehra
- Born: 5 October 1969 (age 57); Delhi, India
- Batting: Right-handed
- Bowling: Right-arm off break
- Role: Batsman
- Relatives: Vijay Mehra (father)

Domestic team information
- Years: Team
- 1989/90–1997/98: Punjab
- 1998/99–1999/00: Rajasthan

Career statistics
Competition	FC	List A
Matches	46	13
Runs scored	2,181	382
Batting average	34.61	34.72
100s/50s	5/8	0/5
Top score	200*	64
Balls bowled	391	96
Wickets	4	1
Bowling average	52.75	70.00
5 wickets in innings	0	0
10 wickets in match	0	n/a
Best bowling	1/0	1/6
Catches/stumpings	45/–	8/–
- Source: ESPNcricinfo, 20 August 2019

Ajay Mehra (born 5 October 1969) is an Indian former first-class cricketer and sports commentator. During his playing career he represented Punjab and Rajasthan. His father Vijay Mehra played Test cricket for India.

== Early and personal life ==
Mehra was born in 1969 in Delhi to Vijay Mehra, an international cricketer, and Kusum Mehra, a professor at Lady Sriram College in Delhi. He has a sister.

== Career ==
A right-handed batsman, Mehra made his first-class debut for Punjab at the age of 20 during the 1989–90 Ranji Trophy. He played most of his cricket for Punjab, before finishing his career with a two-season stint with Rajasthan between 1998/99 and 1999/00. He also played for Rest of India team in the 1994–95 Irani Cup, Board President's XI in a first-class match against England A in 1995 and North Zone in the 1995–96 Duleep Trophy. He scored more than 2000 runs in 46 first-class appearances, with five centuries.

Mehra took to sports commentary after his playing days and worked as a commentator for several networks such as Doordarshan, ESPN India and Neo Sports. Apart from cricket, he also did commentary on kabaddi and Pro Wrestling League.
