= 1987–88 Duleep Trophy =

- Dates: 8 October 1987 – 26 October 1987
- Administrator(s): BCCI
- Cricket format: First-class cricket
- Tournament format(s): Knockout
- Champions: North Zone (6th title)
- Participants: 5
- Matches: 4
- Most runs: Raman Lamba (NZ) (659)
- Most wickets: Arshad Ayub (SZ) & Sarkar Talwar (NZ) (11 each)

The 1987–88 Duleep Trophy was the 27th season of the Duleep Trophy, a first-class cricket tournament contested by five zonal teams of India: Central Zone, East Zone, North Zone, South Zone and West Zone.

North Zone won the final against West Zone from their first innings lead.

== Results ==
Quarterfinal
East Zone
North Zone	FIL

Semifinals
North Zone	W
South Zone
Central Zone
West Zone	FIL

Final
North Zone	FIL
West Zone

=== Final ===
21–26 October 1987
Scorecard

West Zone	v	North Zone
444 (140.1 overs); Anshuman Gaekwad 216; Ajay Sharma 3/30		868 (197 overs); Raman Lamba 320; Rashid Patel 3/86
284/6 (83 overs); Lalchand Rajput 83; Sarkar Talwar 5/91

Match drawn; North Zone won on first innings lead
Jayanti Stadium, Bhilai

- North Zone won the toss and elected to field.
