= 2006–07 Duleep Trophy =

- Dates: 19 October 2006 – 16 November 2006
- Administrator: BCCI
- Cricket format: First-class cricket
- Tournament format(s): Round-robin and knockout
- Champions: North Zone (16th title)
- Participants: 6
- Matches: 7
- Most runs: Malinda Warnapura (Sri Lanka A) (421)
- Most wickets: Rajesh Sharma (NZ) (17)

The 2006–07 Duleep Trophy was the 46th season of the Duleep Trophy, a first-class cricket tournament contested by five zonal teams of India: Central Zone, East Zone, North Zone, South Zone and West Zone. In addition to these five teams, a guest team (Sri Lanka A) also featured in the tournament.

North Zone won the title, defeating Sri Lanka A in the final.

== Results ==
=== Group stage ===
Group A points table

| Team | Matches | Won | Lost | Drawn (WF) | Drawn (LF) | No result | Points | Quotient |
|---|---|---|---|---|---|---|---|---|
| North Zone | 2 | 0 | 0 | 2 | 0 | 0 | 4 | 1.438 |
| East Zone | 2 | 0 | 0 | 1 | 1 | 0 | 2 | 0.933 |
| Central Zone | 2 | 0 | 0 | 2 | 0 | 0 | 0 | 0.703 |

Group B points table

| Team | Matches | Won | Lost | Drawn (WF) | Drawn (LF) | No result | Points | Quotient |
|---|---|---|---|---|---|---|---|---|
| Sri Lanka A | 2 | 2 | 0 | 0 | 0 | 0 | 8 | 1.192 |
| South Zone | 2 | 1 | 1 | 0 | 0 | 0 | 4 | 1.339 |
| West Zone | 2 | 0 | 2 | 0 | 0 | 0 | 0 | 0.600 |

=== Final ===
12–16 November 2006
Scorecard

| Sri Lanka A | v | North Zone |
| 296 (69.1 overs); Chamara Silva 84; Rajesh Sharma 4/85 | | 636/7 dec (192 overs); Aakash Chopra 188; Ishara Amerasinghe 3/124 |
| 426 (113 overs); Malinda Warnapura 149*; Rajesh Sharma 5/119 | | 87/2 (18.1 overs); Aakash Chopra 51*; Jehan Mubarak 1/3 |

North Zone won by 8 wickets
Eden Gardens, Kolkata

- North Zone won the toss and elected to field.
