= 1996–97 Duleep Trophy =

- Dates: 20 November – 8 December 1996
- Administrator: BCCI
- Cricket format: First-class cricket
- Tournament format: Knockout
- Champions: Central Zone (2nd title)
- Participants: 5
- Matches: 4
- Most runs: Rahul Sapru (CZ) (347)
- Most wickets: Obaid Kamal (CZ) (14)

The 1996–97 Duleep Trophy was the 36th season of the Duleep Trophy, a first-class cricket tournament contested by five zonal teams of India: Central Zone, East Zone, North Zone, South Zone and West Zone.

Central Zone won the title, defeating South Zone in the final. It was their second win in 25 years.

== Results ==
Quarterfinal
North Zone	FIL
East Zone

Semifinals
North Zone
South Zone	W
Central Zone	FIL
West Zone

Final
South Zone
Central Zone	W

=== Final ===
4–8 December 1996
Scorecard

Central Zone	v	South Zone
264 (96.1 overs); Gagan Khoda 72; B. Ramprakash 5/85 (32 overs)		225 (91.1 overs); M. V. Sridhar 90; Zakir Hussain 4/68 (22 overs)
359 (139 overs); Rahul Sapru 161; D. J. Gokulakrishnan 4/81 (40 overs)		237 (83.3 overs); Sadagoppan Ramesh 77; Zakir Hussain 5/88 (30.3 overs)

Central Zone won by 161 runs
Punjab Cricket Association Stadium, Mohali
Player of the match: Rahul Sapru (Central Zone)

- South Zone won the toss and elected to field.
- Rahul Sapru (Central Zone), and Amit Pathak and Sadagoppan Ramesh (both South Zone) passed 5,000, 2,000 and 1,000 runs respectively in first-class cricket.
- K. N. Ananthapadmanabhan (South Zone) claimed his 200th wicket in first-class cricket.
