= 2014–15 Duleep Trophy =

- Dates: 15 October 2014 – 2 November 2014
- Administrator: BCCI
- Cricket format: First-class cricket
- Tournament format: Knockout
- Champions: Central Zone (6th title)
- Participants: 5
- Matches: 4
- Most runs: KL Rahul (SZ) (336)
- Most wickets: Rana Dutta (EZ) & Pragyan Ojha (SZ) (8 each)

2014–15 Duleep Trophy was the 54th season of the Duleep Trophy, a first-class cricket tournament contested by 5 zonal teams of India: Central Zone, East Zone, North Zone, South Zone and West Zone. Central Zone won the tournament after beating South Zone by 9 runs in the final at Delhi.

== Schedule ==
The 2014–15 Duleep Trophy consisted of four matches played between the teams, where the two teams that performed the worst in the 2013–14 season of the Duleep Trophy, East Zone and West Zone, had to play each other in an additional knockout game to progress to the semifinals.

The schedule:

1. 15–18 October — Quarterfinal – East Zone vs West Zone
2. 22–25 October — Semifinal1 – Central Zone vs North Zone
3. 22–25 October — Semifinal2 – South Zone vs Winner Quarterfinal
4. 29 October–2 November — Final – Winner Semifinal1 vs Winner Semifinal2

== Squads ==
Central Zone	East Zone	North Zone	South Zone	West Zone
Piyush Chawla (c); Robin Bist; Faiz Fazal; Arindam Ghosh; Ashok Menaria; Amit Mishra; Naman Ojha (wk); Ishwar Pandey; Mahesh Rawat (wk); Jalaj Saxena; Karn Sharma; Shalabh Shrivastava; Anureet Singh; Pankaj Singh; Kuldeep Yadav	Manoj Tiwary (c); Natraj Behera; Sudip Chatterjee; Ashok Dinda; Rana Dutta; Basant Mohanty; Shahbaz Nadeem; Abu Nechim; Rameez Nemat; Govind Podder; Samar Quadri; Wriddhiman Saha (wk); Gokul Sharma; Laxmi Shukla; Saurabh Tiwary	Harbhajan Singh (c); Parvinder Awana; Samiullah Beigh; Yuzvendra Chahal; Rishi Dhawan; Gautam Gambhir; Rajat Paliwal; Harshal Patel; Parvez Rasool; Nitin Saini (wk); Virender Sehwag; Gurkeerat Singh; Jiwanjot Singh; Mandeep Singh; Yuvraj Singh	Vinay Kumar (c); Baba Aparajith; Amogh Desai; Shreyas Gopal; VA Jagadeesh; Dinesh Karthik (wk); Abhimanyu Mithun; Abhinav Mukund; Pragyan Ojha; Ramaswamy Prasanna; KL Rahul; Malolan Rangarajan; Dwaraka Ravi Teja; HS Sharath; Robin Uthappa; Hanuma Vihari	Cheteshwar Pujara (c); Ankit Bawne; Jasprit Bumrah; Akshay Darekar; Harshad Khadiwale; Dhawal Kulkarni; Shrikant Mundhe; Akshar Patel; Parthiv Patel (wk); Yusuf Pathan; Aditya Tare (wk); Shardul Thakur; Saurabh Wakaskar; Suryakumar Yadav; Vijay Zol

== Results ==
Quarterfinal
East Zone	W
West Zone

Semifinals
South Zone	W
East Zone
Central Zone	FIL
North Zone

Final
South Zone
Central Zone	W

=== Quarterfinal ===
15–18 October
Scorecard

East Zone	v	West Zone
278 (75 overs); Manoj Tiwary 100* (140); Dhawal Kulkarni 3/62 (21 overs)		322 (90.4 overs); Ankit Bawne 105 (194); Rana Dutta 5/60 (19 overs)
281/7d (76 overs); Saurabh Tiwary 109 (167); Dhawal Kulkarni 4/28 (16 overs)		135 (44 overs); Parthiv Patel 39 (71); Basant Mohanty 4/44 (16 overs)

East Zone won by 102 runs
CH Bansi Lal Cricket Stadium, Rohtak
Umpires: Krishnamachari Bharatan (Ind) and Mick Martell (Aus)
Player of the match: Basant Mohanty (EZ)

- West Zone won the toss and elected to field.

=== Semifinal 1 ===
22–25 October
Scorecard

Central Zone	v	North Zone
538 (145.4 overs); Naman Ojha 217 (348); Rishi Dhawan 3/123 (32 overs)		457 (118.1 overs); Gautam Gambhir 167 (242); Kuldeep Yadav 3/94 (23 overs)
312 (74.4 overs); Mahesh Rawat 116 (161); Parvinder Awana 3/30 (10 overs)		24/1 (5 overs); Parvez Rasool 12* (9); Mahesh Rawat 1/11 (2 overs)

Match drawn; Central Zone advanced on first innings lead
PCA Stadium, Mohali
Umpires: Mick Martell (Aus) and Krishnamachari Srinivasan (Ind)
Player of the match: Naman Ojha (CZ)

- Central Zone won the toss and elected to bat.

=== Semifinal 2 ===
22–25 October
Scorecard

South Zone	v	East Zone
264 (101.1 overs); Robin Uthappa 120 (196); Laxmi Ratan Shukla 4/40 (21 overs)		84 (47.4 overs); Saurabh Tiwary 17 (43); Stuart Binny 4/24 (13 overs)
		62 (23.4 overs); Laxmi Ratan Shukla 18 (23); HS Sharath 4/27 (7.4 overs)

South Zone won by an innings and 118 runs
CH Bansi Lal Cricket Stadium, Rohtak
Umpires: Pashchim Pathak and Shavir Tarapore (both Ind)
Player of the match: Robin Uthappa (SZ)

- East Zone won the toss and elected to field.

=== Final ===
29 October–2 November
Scorecard

Central Zone	v	South Zone
276 (100 overs); Robin Bist 79 (153); Pragyan Ojha 2/49 (19 overs)		379 (90.3 overs); KL Rahul 185 (233); Ali Murtaza 4/59 (13 overs)
403 (105.5 overs); Robin Bist 112* (174); Shreyas Gopal 4/60 (14.5 overs)		291 (88.4 overs); KL Rahul 130 (152); Ali Murtaza 3/59 (16.4 overs)

Central Zone won by 9 runs
Feroz Shah Kotla Ground, Delhi
Umpires: Anil Chaudhary and K Srinath (both Ind)
Player of the match: KL Rahul (SZ)

- Central Zone won the toss and elected to bat.
