= 1989–90 Duleep Trophy =

- Dates: 25 December 1989 – 10 January 1990
- Administrator(s): BCCI
- Cricket format: First-class cricket
- Tournament format(s): Knockout
- Champions: South Zone (10th title)
- Participants: 5
- Matches: 4
- Most runs: Pravin Amre (CZ) (465)
- Most wickets: Prashant Vaidya & Narendra Hirwani (both CZ) (14 each)

The 1989–90 Duleep Trophy was the 29th season of the Duleep Trophy, a first-class cricket tournament contested by five zonal teams of India: Central Zone, East Zone, North Zone, South Zone and West Zone.

South Zone won the title, defeating Central Zone in the final.

== Results ==
Quarterfinal
Central Zone	FIL
East Zone

Semifinals
Central Zone	FIL
North Zone
South Zone	FIL
West Zone

Final
Central Zone
South Zone	W

=== Final ===
5–10 January 1990
Scorecard

South Zone	v	Central Zone
448 (126.3 overs); V. B. Chandrasekhar 120; Narendra Hirwani 4/125		345 (100.2 overs); U. R. Radhakrishnan 133; Venkatapathy Raju 6/127
527/6 dec (134 overs); Mohammad Azharuddin 184; Prashant Vaidya 4/144		308 (64.5 overs); Pravin Amre 113; M. Venkataramana 6/98

South Zone won by 322 runs
Gymkhana Ground, Secunderabad

- South Zone won the toss and elected to bat.
