= 2000–01 Duleep Trophy =

40th season of the Duleep Trophy in India

- Dates: 4 January 2001 – 4 February 2001
- Administrator: BCCI
- Cricket format: First-class cricket
- Tournament format: Round-robin
- Champions: North Zone (14th title)
- Participants: 5
- Matches: 10
- Most runs: Dinesh Mongia (NZ) (532)
- Most wickets: Debasis Mohanty (EZ) (23)

The 2000–01 Duleep Trophy was the 40th season of the Duleep Trophy, a first-class cricket tournament contested by five zonal teams of India: Central Zone, East Zone, North Zone, South Zone and West Zone.

North Zone won the title by finishing first on the points table.

== Points table ==
Team	Matches	Won	Lost	Drawn (WF)	Drawn (LF)	Points	Quotient
North Zone	4	1	0	3	0	23	1.629
Central Zone	4	1	0	1	2	19	1.086
West Zone	4	1	0	0	3	17	1.336
East Zone	4	1	2	1	0	13	0.614
South Zone	4	0	2	1	1	8	0.693
