= 1981–82 Duleep Trophy =

- Dates: 23 October 1981 – 8 November 1981
- Administrator(s): BCCI
- Cricket format: First-class cricket
- Tournament format(s): Knockout
- Champions: West Zone (11th title)
- Participants: 5
- Matches: 4
- Most runs: Arun Lal (NZ) (260)
- Most wickets: Dilip Doshi (EZ) (13)

The 1981–82 Duleep Trophy was the 21st season of the Duleep Trophy, a first-class cricket tournament contested by five zonal teams of India: Central Zone, East Zone, North Zone, South Zone and West Zone.

West Zone won the final against East Zone on first innings lead.

== Results ==
Quarterfinal
South Zone	C
North Zone

Semifinals
East Zone	W
South Zone
Central Zone
West Zone	W

Final
East Zone
West Zone	FIL

=== Final ===
5–8 November 1981
Scorecard

East Zone	v	West Zone
327 (137 overs); Arun Lal 109; Balwinder Sandhu 4/50		431 (175 overs); Ravi Shastri 134; Dilip Doshi 4/131
138/5 (88 overs); Raja Venkat 27; Dhiraj Parsana 2/24

Match drawn; West Zone won on first innings lead
Brabourne Stadium, Bombay

- East Zone won the toss and elected to bat.
