= 1983–84 Duleep Trophy =

- Dates: 6 January 1984 – 20 January 1984
- Administrator(s): BCCI
- Cricket format: First-class cricket
- Tournament format(s): Knockout
- Champions: North Zone (5th title)
- Participants: 5
- Matches: 4
- Most runs: Mohammad Azharuddin (SZ) (298)
- Most wickets: Chetan Sharma (NZ) (15)

The 1983–84 Duleep Trophy was the 23rd season of the Duleep Trophy, a first-class cricket tournament contested by five zonal teams of India: Central Zone, East Zone, North Zone, South Zone and West Zone.

North Zone won the final against West Zone on first innings lead.

== Results ==
Quarterfinal
Central Zone
South Zone	FIL

Semifinals
South Zone
West Zone	W
East Zone
North Zone	W

Final
North Zone	FIL
West Zone

=== Final ===
17–20 January 1984
Scorecard

North Zone	v	West Zone
401 (140 overs); Surinder Khanna 146; Ashok Patel 4/87		343 (121.5 overs); Anshuman Gaekwad 143; Chetan Sharma 7/83
283/7 (82.2 overs); Mohinder Amarnath 79; Ashok Patel 3/74

Match drawn; North Zone won on first innings lead
Barabati Stadium, Cuttack

- North Zone won the toss and elected to bat.
