= 1973–74 Duleep Trophy =

- Dates: 17 November 1973 – 10 December 1973
- Administrator(s): BCCI
- Cricket format: First-class cricket
- Tournament format(s): Knockout
- Champions: North Zone (1st title)
- Participants: 5
- Matches: 4
- Most runs: Madan Lal (NZ) (182)
- Most wickets: Mohinder Amarnath (NZ) (9)

The 1973–74 Duleep Trophy was the 13th season of the Duleep Trophy, a first-class cricket tournament contested by five zonal teams of India: Central Zone, East Zone, North Zone, South Zone and West Zone.

North Zone won the title, defeating Central Zone in the final.

== Results ==
Quarterfinal
South Zone	FIL
East Zone

Semifinals
South Zone
Central Zone	C
West Zone
North Zone	FIL

Final
Central Zone
North Zone	W

=== Final ===
7–10 December 1973
Scorecard

North Zone	v	Central Zone
270 (94.2 overs); Madan Lal 69; Anil Deshpande 4/63		154 (62.1 overs); Sunil Benjamin 68; Mohinder Amarnath 4/51
162 (62.1 overs); Hari Gidwani 44; Anil Deshpande 3/21		202 (91 overs); Vijay Nayudu 49; Mohinder Amarnath 3/39

North Zone won by 76 runs
Brabourne Stadium, Bombay

- North Zone won the toss and elected to bat.
