= 1986–87 Duleep Trophy =

- Dates: 20 October 1986 – 5 November 1986
- Administrator(s): BCCI
- Cricket format: First-class cricket
- Tournament format(s): Knockout
- Champions: South Zone (9th title)
- Participants: 5
- Matches: 4
- Most runs: Arun Lal (NZ) (501)
- Most wickets: W. V. Raman (SZ) (12)

The 1986–87 Duleep Trophy was the 26th season of the Duleep Trophy, a first-class cricket tournament contested by five zonal teams of India: Central Zone, East Zone, North Zone, South Zone and West Zone.

South Zone won the final against West Zone on first innings lead.

== Results ==
Quarterfinal
Central Zone
East Zone | FIL

Semifinals
West Zone | FIL
East Zone
North Zone
South Zone | W

Final
West Zone
South Zone | FIL

=== Final ===
31 October–5 November 1986
Scorecard

| West Zone | v | South Zone |
| 516 (165.4 overs); Anshuman Gaekwad 138; W. V. Raman 6/123 | | 740 (171.1 overs); Bharat Arun 149; Ravi Shastri 3/143 |
| 472/3 (101 overs); Suresh Keshwala 124*; W. V. Raman 2/57 |

Match drawn; South Zone won on first innings lead
Wankhede Stadium, Bombay

- West Zone won the toss and elected to bat.
