= 1985–86 Duleep Trophy =

- Dates: 5 October 1985 – 21 October 1985
- Administrator(s): BCCI
- Cricket format: First-class cricket
- Tournament format(s): Knockout
- Champions: West Zone (12th title)
- Participants: 5
- Matches: 4
- Most runs: Lalchand Rajput (WZ) (277)
- Most wickets: Ravi Shastri (WZ) (12)

The 1985–86 Duleep Trophy was the 25th season of the Duleep Trophy, a first-class cricket tournament contested by five zonal teams of India: Central Zone, East Zone, North Zone, South Zone and West Zone.

West Zone won the final against South Zone on first innings lead.

== Results ==
Quarterfinal
Central Zone
East Zone	C

Semifinals
South Zone	FIL
East Zone
North Zone
West Zone	FIL

Final
South Zone
West Zone	FIL

=== Final ===
17–21 October 1985
Scorecard

South Zone	v	West Zone
305 (112.5 overs); Roger Binny 115; Ashok Patel 4/86		453 (173 overs); Dilip Vengsarkar 147; Shivlal Yadav 6/109
236 (86.2 overs); Kris Srikkanth 120; Ashok Patel 4/95		89/1 (25 overs); Sunil Gavaskar 44; Shivlal Yadav 1/18

Match drawn; West Zone won on first innings lead
M. Chinnaswamy Stadium, Bangalore

- South Zone won the toss and elected to bat.
