= 1980–81 Duleep Trophy =

- Dates: 7 December 1980 – 23 February 1981
- Administrator(s): BCCI
- Cricket format: First-class cricket
- Tournament format(s): Knockout
- Champions: West Zone (10th title)
- Participants: 5
- Matches: 4
- Most runs: Anshuman Gaekwad (WZ) (309)
- Most wickets: Barun Burman (EZ) (11)

The 1980–81 Duleep Trophy was the 20th season of the Duleep Trophy, a first-class cricket tournament contested by five zonal teams of India: Central Zone, East Zone, North Zone, South Zone and West Zone.

West Zone won the final against East Zone on first innings lead.

== Results ==
Quarterfinal
Central Zone	FIL
South Zone

Semifinals
West Zone	FIL
Central Zone
North Zone
East Zone	FIL

Final
West Zone	FIL
East Zone

=== Final ===
20–23 February 1981
Scorecard

West Zone	v	East Zone
315 (67.3 overs); Rajendra Bhalekar 99; Barun Burman 6/88		214 (131.3 overs); Karun Dubey 88; Narayan Satham 5/52
348/4 dec (105.2 overs); Anshuman Gaekwad 147; Randhir Singh 2/87		186/6 (86 overs); Pranab Roy 36; Ghulam Parkar 1/10

Match drawn; West Zone won on first innings lead
Eden Gardens, Calcutta

- West Zone won the toss and elected to bat.
