= 2010–11 Duleep Trophy =

- Dates: 9 January 2011 – 5 February 2011
- Administrator(s): BCCI
- Cricket format: First-class cricket
- Tournament format(s): Knockout
- Champions: South Zone (12th title)
- Participants: 5
- Matches: 4
- Most runs: Abhinav Mukund (SZ) (367)
- Most wickets: Pragyan Ojha (SZ) (11)

The 2010–11 Duleep Trophy was the 50th season of the Duleep Trophy, a first-class cricket tournament contested by five zonal teams of India: Central Zone, East Zone, North Zone, South Zone and West Zone.

South Zone won the title, defeating North Zone in the final.

== Results ==
Quarterfinal
East Zone
Central Zone	W

Semifinals
South Zone	W
Central Zone
West Zone
North Zone	FIL

Final
South Zone	W
North Zone

=== Final ===
2–6 February 2011
Scorecard

North Zone	v	South Zone
337 (106.1 overs); Paras Dogra 167; Pragyan Ojha 3/49		477 (132.2 overs); Subramaniam Badrinath 136; Joginder Sharma 3/66
317 (88.5 overs); Mithun Manhas 79; Abhimanyu Mithun 3/42		178/3 (23.4 overs); Robin Uthappa 71; Yashpal Singh 2/40

South Zone won by 7 wickets
Dr. Y.S. Rajasekhara Reddy ACA-VDCA Cricket Stadium, Visakhapatnam

- North Zone won the toss and elected to bat.
