= 1975–76 Duleep Trophy =

- Dates: 13 December 1975 – 30 December 1975
- Administrator(s): BCCI
- Cricket format: First-class cricket
- Tournament format(s): Knockout
- Champions: South Zone (7th title)
- Participants: 5
- Matches: 4
- Most runs: Chetan Chauhan (NZ) (303)
- Most wickets: Rajinder Goel (NZ) (18)

The 1975–76 Duleep Trophy was the 15th season of the Duleep Trophy, a first-class cricket tournament contested by five zonal teams of India: Central Zone, East Zone, North Zone, South Zone and West Zone.

South Zone won the title, defeating North Zone in the final.

== Results ==
Quarterfinal
East Zone
North Zone	W

Semifinals
West Zone
North Zone	FIL
South Zone	W
Central Zone

Final
North Zone
South Zone	W

=== Final ===
27–30 December 1975
Scorecard

South Zone	v	North Zone
390 (132.2 overs); Brijesh Patel 105; Rajinder Goel 7/98		291 (73.5 overs); Surinder Amarnath 122*; B. S. Chandrasekhar 5/70
134 (58.1 overs); Gundappa Viswanath 44; Rajinder Goel 5/36		196 (77.4 overs); Venkat Sunderam 56; S. Venkataraghavan 5/62

South Zone won by 37 runs
Lal Bahadur Shastri Stadium, Hyderabad

- South Zone won the toss and elected to bat.
