= 2008–09 Duleep Trophy =

Cricket tournament

- Dates: 22 January 2009 – 9 February 2009
- Administrator(s): BCCI
- Cricket format: First-class cricket
- Tournament format(s): Knockout
- Champions: West Zone (17th title)
- Participants: 5
- Matches: 4
- Most runs: Dinesh Karthik (SZ) (392)
- Most wickets: Maripuri Suresh (SZ) (16)

The 2008–09 Duleep Trophy was the 48th season of the Duleep Trophy, a first-class cricket tournament contested by five zonal teams of India: Central Zone, East Zone, North Zone, South Zone and West Zone.

West Zone won the title, defeating South Zone in the final.

== Results ==
Quarterfinal
South Zone	FIL
Central Zone

Semifinals
North Zone
South Zone	W
West Zone	W
East Zone

Final
South Zone
West Zone	W

=== Final ===
5–9 February 2009
Scorecard

West Zone	v	South Zone
459 (141.4 overs); Ajinkya Rahane 165; S. Sreesanth 3/108		199 (73.2 overs); Subramaniam Badrinath 100*; Ramesh Powar 3/47
417/8 dec (92 overs); Parthiv Patel 131; S. Sreesanth 2/59		403 (100 overs); Robin Uthappa 94; Ramesh Powar 7/140

West Zone won by 274 runs
M. A. Chidambaram Stadium, Chennai

- West Zone won the toss and elected to bat.
