= 1984–85 Duleep Trophy =

- Dates: 20 October 1984 – 11 February 1985
- Administrator(s): BCCI
- Cricket format: First-class cricket
- Tournament format(s): Knockout
- Champions: South Zone (8th title)
- Participants: 5
- Matches: 4
- Most runs: Mohammad Azharuddin (SZ) (298)
- Most wickets: Chetan Sharma (NZ) (15)

The 1984–85 Duleep Trophy was the 24th season of the Duleep Trophy, a first-class cricket tournament contested by five zonal teams of India: Central Zone, East Zone, North Zone, South Zone and West Zone.

South Zone won the title, defeating North Zone in the final.

== Results ==
Quarterfinal
Central Zone	W
East Zone

Semifinals
Central Zone
North Zone	W
West Zone
South Zone	FIL

Final
North Zone
South Zone	W

=== Final ===
9–11 February 1985
Scorecard

South Zone	v	North Zone
212 (49.5 overs); Syed Kirmani 82; Maninder Singh 3/22		164 (60 overs); Gursharan Singh 68; Raghuram Bhat 4/42
236 (75.1 overs); Abdul Jabbar 68; Ajay Jha 5/76		211 (52.5 overs); Rajinder Ghai 54; Bharat Arun 5/84

South Zone won by 73 runs
Feroz Shah Kotla Ground, Delhi

- North Zone won the toss and elected to field.
