= 2003–04 Duleep Trophy =

- Dates: 14 February 2004 – 8 March 2004
- Administrator: BCCI
- Cricket format: First-class cricket
- Tournament format(s): Round-robin and knockout
- Champions: North Zone (15th title)
- Participants: 6
- Matches: 7
- Most runs: Kevin Pietersen (England A) (345)
- Most wickets: Shib Paul (EZ) (17)

The 2003–04 Duleep Trophy was the 43rd season of the Duleep Trophy, a first-class cricket tournament contested by five zonal teams of India: Central Zone, East Zone, North Zone, South Zone and West Zone. In addition to these five teams, a guest team (England A) also featured in the tournament.

North Zone won the title, defeating East Zone in the final.

== Results ==
=== Group stage points Table ===
Team	Matches	Won	Lost	Drawn (WF)	Drawn (LF)	No result	Points	Quotient
Group A
North Zone	2	2	0	0	0	0	8	1.175
West Zone	2	0	1	0	0	1	1	0.983
Central Zone	2	0	1	0	0	1	1	0.805
Group B
East Zone	2	1	0	1	0	0	6	1.100
South Zone	2	1	0	0	1	0	4	1.278
England A	2	0	2	0	0	0	0	0.803
Source: CricketArchive

=== Final ===
4–8 March 2004
Scorecard

North Zone	v	East Zone
330 (99.1 overs); Yuvraj Singh 106; Shib Paul 5/83		322 (91.5 overs); Kiran Powar 102; Sarandeep Singh 5/64
400 (105 overs); Yuvraj Singh 148; Utpal Chatterjee 4/63		349 (106.5 overs); Kiran Powar 97; Mithun Manhas 3/15

North Zone won by 59 runs
Punjab Cricket Association Stadium, Mohali

- East Zone won the toss and elected to field.
