= History of cricket in India from 1960–61 to 1970 =

This article describes the history of cricket in India from the 1960–61 season until 1970.

== Events ==
One team totally dominated Indian cricket in the 1960s. As part of 15 consecutive victories in the Ranji Trophy from 1958–59 to 1972–73, Bombay won the title in all ten seasons of the period under review. Among its players were Farokh Engineer, Dilip Sardesai, Bapu Nadkarni, Ramakant Desai, Baloo Gupte, Ashok Mankad and Ajit Wadekar.

In the 1961–62 season, the Duleep Trophy was inaugurated as a zonal competition. It was named after former England cricket and Ranjitsinhji's nephew, Kumar Shri Duleepsinhji (1905–59). With Bombay in its catchment, it is not surprising that the West Zone won six of the first nine titles.

== Domestic cricket ==
=== Ranji Trophy winners ===
- 1960–61 – Bombay
- 1961–62 – Bombay
- 1962–63 – Bombay
- 1963–64 – Bombay
- 1964–65 – Bombay
- 1965–66 – Bombay
- 1966–67 – Bombay
- 1967–68 – Bombay
- 1968–69 – Bombay
- 1969–70 – Bombay

=== Duleep Trophy winners ===
- 1961–62 – West Zone
- 1962–63 – West Zone
- 1963–64 – West Zone
- 1964–65 – West Zone
- 1965–66 – South Zone
- 1966–67 – South Zone
- 1967–68 – South Zone
- 1968–69 – West Zone
- 1969–70 – West Zone

== Leading players by season ==
The lists below give the leading first-class runscorers and wicket-takers in each domestic season.

=== Batsmen ===
- 1960–61 –

=== Bowlers ===
- 1960–61 –

== International tours of India ==
=== Pakistan 1960–61 ===
- 1st Test at Brabourne Stadium, Bombay – match drawn
- 2nd Test at Modi Stadium, Kanpur – match drawn
- 3rd Test at Eden Gardens, Calcutta – match drawn
- 4th Test at Nehru Stadium, Madras – match drawn
- 5th Test at Feroz Shah Kotla, Delhi – match drawn

=== England 1961–62 ===
- 1st Test at Brabourne Stadium, Bombay – match drawn
- 2nd Test at Modi Stadium, Kanpur – match drawn
- 3rd Test at Feroz Shah Kotla, Delhi – match drawn
- 4th Test at Eden Gardens, Calcutta – India won by 187 runs
- 5th Test at Nehru Stadium, Madras – India won by 128 runs

=== International Cavaliers 1962–63 ===
The International Cavaliers toured Africa and India in 1962–63 to promote cricket. The team included Norm O'Neill, Barry Shepherd. Richie Benaud, Garth McKenzie, Arthur Morris, Mickey Stewart and Roy Swetman.

=== England 1963–64 ===
- 1st Test at Nehru Stadium, Madras – match drawn
- 2nd Test at Brabourne Stadium, Bombay – match drawn
- 3rd Test at Eden Gardens, Calcutta – match drawn
- 4th Test at Feroz Shah Kotla, Delhi – match drawn
- 5th Test at Modi Stadium, Kanpur – match drawn

=== Australia 1964–65 ===
- 1st Test at Nehru Stadium, Madras – Australia won by 139 runs
- 2nd Test at Brabourne Stadium, Bombay – India won by 2 wickets
- 3rd Test at Eden Gardens, Calcutta – match drawn

=== New Zealand 1964–65 ===
- 1st Test at Nehru Stadium, Madras – match drawn
- 2nd Test at Eden Gardens, Calcutta – match drawn
- 3rd Test at Brabourne Stadium, Bombay – match drawn
- 4th Test at Feroz Shah Kotla, Delhi – India won by 7 wickets

=== Ceylon 1964–65 ===
For information about this tour, see : Ceylon cricket team in India in 1964–65

=== Commonwealth XI 1964–65 ===
For information about this tour, see : Commonwealth XI cricket team in India in 1964-65

=== West Indies 1966–67 ===
- 1st Test at Brabourne Stadium, Bombay – West Indies won by 6 wickets
- 2nd Test at Eden Gardens, Calcutta – West Indies won by an innings and 45 runs
- 3rd Test at MA Chidambaram Stadium, Chepauk, Madras – match drawn

=== New Zealand 1969–70 ===
- 1st Test at Brabourne Stadium, Bombay – India won by 60 runs
- 2nd Test at Vidarbha Cricket Association Ground, Nagpur – New Zealand won by 167 runs
- 3rd Test at Lal Bahadur Shastri Stadium, Hyderabad – match drawn

=== Australia 1969–70 ===
- 1st Test at Brabourne Stadium, Bombay – Australia won by 8 wickets
- 2nd Test at Modi Stadium, Kanpur – match drawn
- 3rd Test at Feroz Shah Kotla, Delhi – India won by 7 wickets
- 4th Test at Eden Gardens, Calcutta – Australia won by 10 wickets
- 5th Test at MA Chidambaram Stadium, Chepauk, Madras – Australia won by 77 runs

For information about this tour, see : Australian cricket team in Ceylon and India in 1969-70

== External sources ==
- CricketArchive – Itinerary of Events in India
