= 1972–73 Duleep Trophy =

- Dates: 10 November 1972 – 26 November 1972
- Administrator(s): BCCI
- Cricket format: First-class cricket
- Tournament format(s): Knockout
- Champions: Central Zone (7th title)
- Participants: 5
- Matches: 4
- Most runs: Ajit Wadekar (WZ) (322)
- Most wickets: Pandurang Salgaoncar (WZ) (18)

The 1972–73 Duleep Trophy was the 12th season of the Duleep Trophy, a first-class cricket tournament contested by five zonal teams of India: Central Zone, East Zone, North Zone, South Zone and West Zone.

West Zone won the title, defeating Central Zone in the final.

== Results ==
Quarterfinal
North Zone
East Zone	FIL

Semifinals
East Zone
Central Zone	FIL
South Zone
West Zone	W

Final
Central Zone
West Zone	W

=== Final ===
24–26 November 1972
Scorecard

Central Zone	v	West Zone
246 (87.3 overs); Kailash Gattani 46*; Pandurang Salgaoncar 7/72		530/7 dec (127 overs); Ajit Wadekar 171; Ashok Jagdale 2/90
112 (38.3 overs); Ashok Jagdale 45; Abdul Ismail 3/30

West Zone won by an innings and 172 runs
Brabourne Stadium, Bombay

- Central Zone won the toss and elected to bat.
