= 2004–05 Duleep Trophy =

Cricket tournament in India

- Dates: 15 February 2005 – 10 March 2005
- Administrator: BCCI
- Cricket format: First-class cricket
- Tournament format(s): Round-robin and knockout
- Champions: Central Zone (5th title)
- Participants: 6
- Matches: 7
- Most runs: Yuvraj Singh (NZ) (291)
- Most wickets: Jai Prakash Yadav (CZ) (20)

The 2004–05 Duleep Trophy was the 44th season of the Duleep Trophy, a first-class cricket tournament contested by five zonal teams of India: Central Zone, East Zone, North Zone, South Zone and West Zone. In addition to these five teams, a guest team (Bangladesh Cricket Board XI) also featured in the tournament.

Central Zone won the title, defeating North Zone in the final.

== Results ==
=== Group stage ===
Group A points table

Team	Matches	Won	Lost	Drawn (WF)	Drawn (LF)	No result	Points	Quotient
North Zone	2	2	0	0	0	0	8	1.675
West Zone	2	1	1	0	0	0	4	1.000
South Zone	2	0	2	0	0	0	0	0.597

Group B points table

Team	Matches	Won	Lost	Drawn (WF)	Drawn (LF)	No result	Points	Quotient
Central Zone	2	1	0	1	0	0	6	1.437
East Zone	2	1	1	0	0	0	5	1.609
BCB XI	2	0	1	0	1	0	0	0.454

=== Final ===
8–10 March 2005
Scorecard

North Zone	v	Central Zone
104 (50.3 overs); Reetinder Sodhi 27; Jai Prakash Yadav 5/26		133 (49.3 overs); Naman Ojha 55; Reetinder Sodhi 3/10
169 (61.4 overs); Ravneet Ricky 37; Harvinder Singh 3/17		142/1 (33.1 overs); Sanjay Bangar 62*; Gagandeep Singh 1/25

Central Zone won by 9 wickets
Vidarbha Cricket Association Ground, Nagpur

- Central Zone won the toss and elected to field.
