= 1988–89 Duleep Trophy =

- Dates: 10 September 1988 – 27 September 1988
- Administrator(s): BCCI
- Cricket format: First-class cricket
- Tournament format(s): Knockout
- Champions: shared by North Zone (7th title) and West Zone (13th title)
- Participants: 5
- Matches: 4
- Most runs: Arun Lal (NZ) (161)
- Most wickets: Maninder Singh (NZ) (7)

The 1988–89 Duleep Trophy was the 28th season of the Duleep Trophy, a first-class cricket tournament contested by five zonal teams of India: Central Zone, East Zone, North Zone, South Zone and West Zone.

The title was shared by North Zone and West Zone.

== Results ==
Quarterfinal
Central Zone
East Zone	FIL

Semifinals
North Zone	FIL
East Zone
South Zone
West Zone	FIL

Final
North Zone
West Zone

=== Final ===
22–27 September 1988
Scorecard

West Zone	v	North Zone
285 (105.2 overs); Kiran More 113; Kapil Dev 3/43		18/0 (4 overs); Manoj Prabhakar 8*

Match drawn; Trophy shared
Feroz Shah Kotla Ground, Delhi

- North Zone won the toss and elected to field.
