= 1991–92 Duleep Trophy =

- Dates: 8 January 1992 – 25 January 1992
- Administrator(s): BCCI
- Cricket format: First-class cricket
- Tournament format(s): Knockout
- Champions: North Zone (9th title)
- Participants: 5
- Matches: 4
- Most runs: Vinod Kambli (WZ) (293)
- Most wickets: Abey Kuruvilla (WZ) (16)

The 1991–92 Duleep Trophy was the 31st season of the Duleep Trophy, a first-class cricket tournament contested by five zonal teams of India: Central Zone, East Zone, North Zone, South Zone and West Zone.

North Zone won the title, defeating West Zone in the final.

== Results ==
Quarterfinal
Central Zone
South Zone	W

Semifinals
North Zone	W
South Zone
West Zone	W
East Zone

Final
North Zone	W
West Zone

=== Final ===
21–25 January 1992
Scorecard

North Zone	v	West Zone
279 (99.4 overs); Rajesh Puri 58; Mukesh Narula 5/48		216 (72.3 overs); Nayan Mongia 52; Chetan Sharma 6/65
393 (123.3 overs); Bhaskar Pillai 104; Abey Kuruvilla 6/98		220 (80.3 overs); Vinod Kambli 58; Maninder Singh 4/55

North Zone won by 236 runs
Sardar Vallabhbhai Patel Stadium, Valsad

- North Zone won the toss and elected to bat.
