= 2009–10 Duleep Trophy =

- Dates: 19 January 2010 – 6 February 2010
- Administrator(s): BCCI
- Cricket format: First-class cricket
- Tournament format(s): Knockout
- Champions: West Zone (18th title)
- Participants: 5
- Matches: 4
- Most runs: Dinesh Karthik (SZ) (333)
- Most wickets: Irfan Pathan (WZ) (9)

The 2009–10 Duleep Trophy was the 49th season of the Duleep Trophy, a first-class cricket tournament contested by five zonal teams of India: Central Zone, East Zone, North Zone, South Zone and West Zone.

West Zone won the title, defeating South Zone in the final. West Zone made the highest successful chase in first-class cricket to win the trophy.

== Results ==
Quarterfinal
Central Zone	FIL
East Zone

Semifinals
Central Zone
South Zone	W
West Zone	FIL
North Zone

Final
South Zone
West Zone	W

=== Final ===
2–6 February 2010
Scorecard

South Zone	v	West Zone
400 (103 overs); Dinesh Karthik 183; Irfan Pathan 5/100		251 (56.2 overs); Yusuf Pathan 108; C. Ganapathy 5/75
386/9 dec (88 overs); Dinesh Karthik 150; Dhawal Kulkarni 5/58		541/7 (136.3 overs); Yusuf Pathan 210*; Alfred Absolem 2/79

West Zone won by 3 wickets
Rajiv Gandhi International Stadium, Hyderabad

- South Zone won the toss and elected to bat.
