= 1993–94 Duleep Trophy =

- Dates: 10 October 1993 – 19 November 1993
- Administrator: BCCI
- Cricket format: First-class cricket
- Tournament format: Round-robin
- Champions: North Zone (11th title)
- Participants: 5
- Matches: 10
- Most runs: Sanjay Manjrekar (WZ) (497)
- Most wickets: Narendra Hirwani (CZ) (21)

The 1993–94 Duleep Trophy was the 33rd season of the Duleep Trophy, a first-class cricket tournament contested by five zonal teams of India: Central Zone, East Zone, North Zone, South Zone and West Zone.

North Zone won the title by finishing first on the points table.

== Points table ==
Team	Matches	Won	Lost	Lost (WF)	Drawn (WF)	Drawn (LF)	Points	Run rate
North Zone	4	2	1	0	1	0	14	3.339
West Zone	4	2	2	0	0	0	12	3.002
East Zone	4	2	1	0	0	1	12	2.988
South Zone	4	2	2	0	0	0	12	2.807
Central Zone	4	1	2	1	0	0	8	3.141
