= 1995–96 Duleep Trophy =

- Dates: 11 October 1995 – 1 December 1995
- Administrator: BCCI
- Cricket format: First-class cricket
- Tournament format: Round-robin
- Champions: South Zone (11th title)
- Participants: 5
- Matches: 10
- Most runs: V. V. S. Laxman (SZ) (395)
- Most wickets: Bharati Vij (NZ) (26)

The 1995–96 Duleep Trophy was the 35th season of the Duleep Trophy, a first-class cricket tournament contested by five zonal teams of India: Central Zone, East Zone, North Zone, South Zone and West Zone.

South Zone won the title by finishing first on the points table.

== Points table ==
Team	Matches	Won	Lost	Drawn	No result	Points	Quotient
South Zone	4	3	0	0	1	19	1.672
Central Zone	4	2	1	0	1	13	1.106
West Zone	4	2	2	0	0	12	0.859
East Zone	4	1	3	0	0	6	0.898
North Zone	4	1	3	0	0	6	0.786
