= 1994–95 Duleep Trophy =

- Dates: 25 October 1994 – 4 December 1994
- Administrator: BCCI
- Cricket format: First-class cricket
- Tournament format: Round-robin
- Champions: North Zone (12th title)
- Participants: 5
- Matches: 10
- Most runs: Surendra Bhave (WZ) (651)
- Most wickets: Bharati Vij (NZ) (20)

The 1994–95 Duleep Trophy was the 34th season of the Duleep Trophy, a first-class cricket tournament contested by five zonal teams of India: Central Zone, East Zone, North Zone, South Zone and West Zone.

North Zone won the title by finishing first on the points table.

== Points table ==
Team	Matches	Won	Lost	Lost (WF)	Drawn (WF)	Drawn (LF)	Points	Run rate
North Zone	4	2	0	0	2	0	16	3.057
South Zone	4	1	1	0	1	1	8	2.788
West Zone	4	1	0	0	1	2	8	2.722
Central Zone	4	0	2	0	2	0	4	2.847
East Zone	4	0	1	0	0	3	0	2.419
