= 2011–12 Duleep Trophy =

- Dates: 27 January 2012 – 14 February 2012
- Administrator: BCCI
- Cricket format: First-class cricket
- Tournament format: Knockout
- Champions: East Zone (1st title)
- Participants: 5
- Matches: 4
- Most runs: Anustup Majumdar (EZ) (348)
- Most wickets: Ashok Dinda (EZ) (22)

The 2011–12 Duleep Trophy was the 51st season of the Duleep Trophy, a first-class cricket tournament contested by five zonal teams of India: Central Zone, East Zone, North Zone, South Zone and West Zone.

East Zone won the title, defeating Central Zone in the final.

== Results ==
Quarterfinal
East Zone	W
West Zone

Semifinals
North Zone
East Zone	FIL
Central Zone	FIL
South Zone

Final
East Zone	W
Central Zone

=== Final ===
12–14 February 2012
Scorecard

Central Zone	v	East Zone
133 (49.3 overs); Naman Ojha 44; Ashok Dinda 4/29		370 (110.1 overs); Wriddhiman Saha 170; Piyush Chawla 3/73
217 (61 overs); Jalaj Saxena 46; Mohammed Shami 4/50

East Zone won by an innings and 20 runs
Holkar Stadium, Indore

- East Zone won the toss and elected to field.
