= History of cricket in India from 2000–01 =

This article describes the history of cricket in India from the 2000–01 season to the present.

The Australia national cricket team toured India from February to April 2001 for a three-Test series and a five-match ODI series.

== Events ==
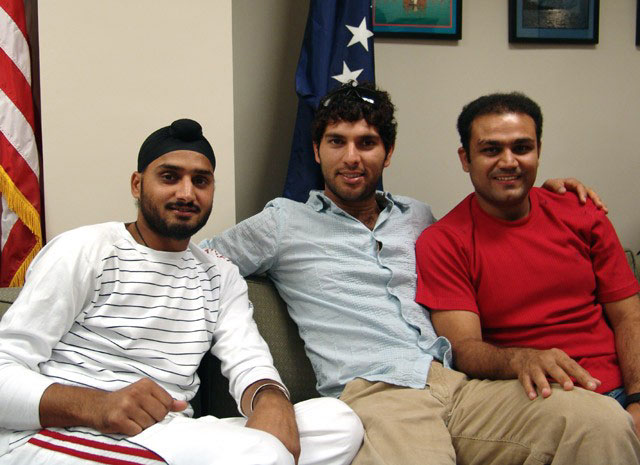
Former Indian cricketers Harbhajan Singh, Yuvraj Singh and Virender Sehwag (left to right)

The BCCI tinkered with the Duleep Trophy in the 2002–03 season. The original zonal teams were replaced by five new teams called Elite A, Elite B, Elite C, Plate A and Plate B. These teams were constructed from the new Elite Group and Plate Group divisions which had been introduced into the Ranji Trophy that season. However, this format lasted for only one season as it was felt that the new teams lacked a sense of identity. From the 2003–04 season, the five original zonal teams competed along with a sixth guest team which was a touring foreign team. The first guest team was England A in 2003–04.

The Indian Premier League has become very popular in India since its inaugural in 2008.

Mumbai (formerly Bombay) has continued its dominance of the domestic scene into the 21st century by winning the Ranji Trophy five times in the first decade.

Noted Indian cricketers in the 21st century include Sachin Tendulkar, Mahendra Singh Dhoni, Rahul Dravid, Sourav Ganguly, Anil Kumble, Virender Sehwag, Yuvraj Singh, VVS Laxman, Gautam Gambhir, Zaheer Khan, Harbhajan Singh, Rohit Sharma and Virat Kohli.

India won the inaugural ICC World Twenty20 in 2007. Gautam Gambhir and Yuvraj Singh consistently performed for the team, while others chipping in occasionally.

India was the first sub-continental team to win a test match at the WACA in January 2008 against Australia.

The Indian cricket team, headed by Mahendra Singh Dhoni, also went on to win the ICC Cricket World Cup 2011 and became the first team in history to win the Cup at home.

== Domestic cricket ==
=== Ranji Trophy winners ===
- 2000–01 – Baroda
- 2001–02 – Railways
- 2002–03 – Mumbai
- 2003–04 – Mumbai
- 2004–05 – Railways
- 2005–06 – Uttar Pradesh
- 2006–07 – Mumbai
- 2007–08 – Delhi
- 2008–09 – Mumbai
- 2009–10 – Mumbai
- 2010–11 – Rajasthan
- 2011–12 – Rajasthan
- 2012–13 – Mumbai
- 2013–14 – Karnataka
- 2014–15 – Karnataka

=== Duleep Trophy winners ===
- 2000–01 – North Zone
- 2001–02 – West Zone
- 2002–03 – Elite C
- 2003–04 – North Zone
- 2004–05 – Central Zone
- 2005–06 – West Zone
- 2006–07 – North Zone
- 2007–08 – North Zone
- 2008–09 – West Zone
- 2009–10 – West Zone
- 2010–11 – South Zone
- 2011–12 – East Zone
- 2012–13 – East Zone
- 2013–14 – North Zone & South Zone Shared
- 2014–15 – Central Zone

== International tours of India ==
=== Zimbabwe 2000–01 ===
- 1st Test at Feroz Shah Kotla, Delhi – India won by 7 wickets
- 2nd Test at Vidarbha Cricket Association Ground, Nagpur – match drawn

=== Australia 2000–01 ===
- 1st Test at Wankhede Stadium, Mumbai – Australia won by 10 wickets
- 2nd Test at Eden Gardens, Calcutta – India won by 171 runs
- 3rd Test at MA Chidambaram Stadium, Chepauk, Chennai – India won by 2 wickets

=== England 2001–02 ===
- 1st Test at Punjab Cricket Association Stadium, Mohali – India won by 10 wickets
- 2nd Test at Sardar Patel Stadium, Motera, Ahmedabad – match drawn
- 3rd Test at M Chinnaswamy Stadium, Bangalore – match drawn

=== Zimbabwe 2001–02 ===
- 1st Test at Vidarbha Cricket Association Ground, Nagpur – India won by an innings and 101 runs
- 2nd Test at Feroz Shah Kotla, Delhi – India won by 4 wickets

=== West Indies 2002–03 ===
- 1st Test at Wankhede Stadium, Mumbai – India won by an innings and 112 runs
- 2nd Test at MA Chidambaram Stadium, Chepauk, Chennai – India won by 8 wickets
- 3rd Test at Eden Gardens, Kolkata – match drawn

=== New Zealand 2003–04 ===
- 1st Test at Sardar Patel Stadium, Motera, Ahmedabad – match drawn
- 2nd Test at Punjab Cricket Association Stadium, Mohali – match drawn

=== Australia 2004–05 ===
- 1st Test at M Chinnaswamy Stadium, Bangalore – Australia won by 217 runs
- 2nd Test at MA Chidambaram Stadium, Chepauk, Chennai – match drawn
- 3rd Test at Vidarbha Cricket Association Ground, Nagpur – Australia won by 342 runs
- 4th Test at Wankhede Stadium, Mumbai – India won by 13 runs

=== South Africa 2004–05 ===
- 1st Test at Modi Stadium, Kanpur – match drawn
- 2nd Test at Eden Gardens, Kolkata – India won by 8 wickets

=== Pakistan 2004–05 ===
- 1st Test at Punjab Cricket Association Stadium, Mohali – match drawn
- 2nd Test at Eden Gardens, Kolkata – India won by 195 runs
- 3rd Test at M Chinnaswamy Stadium, Bangalore – Pakistan won by 168 runs

=== South Africa 2005–06 ===
Limited overs tour only.

=== Sri Lanka 2005–06 ===
- 1st Test at MA Chidambaram Stadium, Chepauk, Chennai – match drawn
- 2nd Test at Feroz Shah Kotla, Delhi – India won by 188 runs
- 3rd Test at Sardar Patel Stadium, Motera, Ahmedabad – India won by 259 runs

=== England 2005–06 ===
- 1st Test at Vidarbha Cricket Association Ground, Nagpur – match drawn
- 2nd Test at Punjab Cricket Association Stadium, Mohali – India won by 9 wickets
- 3rd Test at Wankhede Stadium, Mumbai – England won by 212 runs

=== Sri Lanka 2006–07 ===
Limited overs tour only.

=== West Indies 2006–07 ===
Limited overs tour only.

== External sources ==
- CricketArchive – Itinerary of Events in India
