= 2026–27 Duleep Trophy =

2026 Duleep Trophy
- Dates: 23 August – 10 September
- Administrator: Board of Control for Cricket in India
- Cricket format: First-class
- Tournament format: Knockout
- Host: India
- Champions: East Zone (3rd title)
- Runners-up: South Zone
- Participants: 6
- Matches: 5
- Player of the series: Tilak Varma (South Zone)
- Most runs: Ishan Kishan (East Zone) (409)
- Most wickets: Mukesh Kumar (East Zone) (12); Abid Mushtaq (North Zone) (12)
- Official website: Duleep Trophy

The 2026–27 Duleep Trophy was the 63rd edition of the Duleep Trophy, a domestic first-class cricket competition played in India. It took place from 23 August to 10 September 2026. The tournament featured six teams: Central Zone, East Zone, North Zone, North East Zone, South Zone, and West Zone. All squads were picked by state association selectors representing their zonal teams. It marked the beginning of the 2026–27 Indian Domestic Season.

== Format ==
The tournament featured six teams playing in a single-elimination bracket. Central Zone and South Zone pre-qualified to the semifinals being the previous season's winners and runners-up respectively, with the four remaining zonal teams required to play a quarterfinal match to start the competition.

== Squads ==
Source: Sportstar

- † denotes Wicket-keeper

| Central Zone | East Zone | North Zone | North East Zone | South Zone | West Zone |
Captain
| Rajat Patidar (MPCA) | Ishan Kishan † (JSCA) | Kanhaiya Wadhawan † (JKCA) | Rongsen Jonathan (NCA) | Tilak Varma (HCA) | Ruturaj Gaikwad (MHCA) |
Batters
| Rinku Singh (UPCA); Aman Mokhade (VCA); Yash Rathod (VCA); Kunal Chandela (CAU); Aayush Pandey (CSCS) | Vaibhav Sooryavanshi (BCA); Virat Singh (JSCA); Abhimanyu Easwaran (CAB); Sudip Kumar Gharami (CAB); Subhranshu Senapati (OCA) | Qamran Iqbal (JKCA); Yash Dhull (DDCA); Ayush Doseja (DDCA); Sanat Sangwan (DDCA) | Kishan Lyndoh (MCA); Joseph Lal Thankhuma (CAM) | Ricky Bhui (ACA); Shaik Rasheed (ACA); Kodimela Himateja (HCA); Karun Nair (KSCA); R Smaran (KSCA) | Prithvi Shaw (MHCA); ~~Sarfaraz Khan (MCA)~~; Jay Gohil (SCA); Shivalik Sharma (SCA) |
Wicket-Keepers
| Aryan Juyal (UPCA); Kunal Singh Rathore (RCA) | Kumar Kushagra (JSCA) | | Arpit Bhatewara (MCA); Ashish Thapa (SCA) | Narayan Jagadeesan (TNCA) | Urvil Patel (GCA); Harvik Desai (SCA) |
All-Rounders
| Saransh Jain (MPCA); Arshad Khan (MPCA); Harsh Dubey (VCA) | Anukul Roy (JSCA); Shikhar Mohan (JSCA); Shahbaz Ahmed (CAB); Suraj Sindhu Jaiswal (CAB) | Abid Mushtaq (JKCA); Ayush Badoni (DDCA); Nishant Sindhu (HCA); Arjun Sharma (HPCA) | Techi Neri (ACA); Robin Limboo (SCA); Imliwati Lemtur (NCA); Priyojit Singh Kangabam (MNCA); Ronald Longjam (MNCA); Pheiroijam Jotin (MNCA) | Shreyas Gopal (KSCA); Aman Khan (CAP); Abhinav Tejrana (GCA) | Musheer Khan (MCA); Shams Mulani (MCA); Tanush Kotian (MCA); Shardul Thakur (MCA); Atit Sheth (BCA); Jaymeet Patel (GCA) |
Bowlers
| Zeeshan Ansari (UPCA); Yash Thakur (VCA); Nachiket Bhute (VCA); Aryan Pandey (MPCA) | Mohammed Shami (CAB); Mukesh Kumar (CAB); Denish Das (ACA); Abhijit Sarkar (TCA) | Yudhvir Singh (JKCA); Sunil Kumar (JKCA); Arshdeep Singh (PCA); Anshul Kamboj (HCA); Nikhil Kashyap (HCA) | Akash Choudhary (MCA); Lalrempuia (CAM); Vino Zhimomi (NCA); Bishworjit Konthoujam (MNCA) | Vidwath Kaverappa (KSCA); Kavuri Saiteja (ACA); Tripurana Vijay (ACA); Tanay Thyagarajan (HCA); M.D. Nidheesh (KCA) | Mukesh Choudhary (MHCA); Tushar Deshpande (MCA); Siddharth Desai (GCA) |
Reserve Players
| Kunal Yadav (UPCA); Kumar Kartikeya (MPCA); Amandeep Khare (CSCS); Mayank Mishra (CAU); Saurabh Rawat (CAU); Bhargav Merai (RSPB) | Ayush Loharuka (BCA); Sharandeep Singh (JSCA); Sambit Baral (OCA); Swastik Samal (OCA); Sridam Paul (TCA) | | K. Vanrotlinga (CAM); Yorjum Sera (ACA); Lee Yong Lepcha (SCA); Hem Chetri (NCA); Rex Rajkumar (MNCA) | Chama Milind (HCA); Vijaykumar Vyshak (KSCA); Sai Kishore (TNCA); C Andre Siddhart (TNCA); K Kannan (CAP); Vishnu Vinod (KCA) | Arshin Kulkarni (MHCA); Rajvardhan Hangargekar (MHCA); Mahesh Pithiya (BCA); Aarya Desai (GCA); Vishal Jayswal (GCA) |

== Fixtures ==
=== Bracket ===
Quarterfinals
North East Zone | 111 & 146 (f/o)
East Zone | 467
North Zone | 251 & 222
West Zone | 187 & 234

Semifinals
Central Zone | 266 & 158
East Zone | 266 & 162/6
South Zone | 312 & 182/3
North Zone | 195 & 297

Final
East Zone | 708 & 388/7d
South Zone | 336

=== Quarterfinals ===
23—25 August 2026
Quarter Final 1
Scorecard

| East Zone | v | North East Zone |
| 467 (112.5 overs); Shahbaz Ahmed 167 (244); Pheiroijam Jotin 3/64 (22 overs) | | 111 (42.5 overs); Arpit Bhatewara 32 (76); Abhijit Sarkar 5/20 (9.5 overs) |
| | | 146 (50 overs) (f/o); Pheiroijam Jotin 39 (75); Anukul Roy 5/37 (15 overs) |

East Zone won by an innings and 210 runs
BCCI COE Ground 2, Bengaluru
Umpires: Anil Dandekar and Puttarangaiah Jayapal
Player of the match: Shahbaz Ahmed (East Zone)

- North East Zone won the toss and elected to field.
- While four days of play were scheduled for this First-class match, the match reached a result in three days.

23—26 August 2026
Quarter Final 2
Scorecard

| North Zone | v | West Zone |
| 251 (66.5 overs); Anshul Kamboj 60 (52); Tushar Deshpande 4/57 (15 overs) | | 187 (65.4 overs); Shams Mulani 52 (94); Abid Mushtaq 5/39 (25.4 overs) |
| 222 (51 overs); Ayush Badoni 50 (62); Tanush Kotian 4/46 (14 overs) | | 234 (57.3 overs); Musheer Khan 96 (126); Abid Mushtaq 4/60 (22 overs) |

North Zone won by 52 runs
BCCI COE Ground 1, Bengaluru
Umpires: Kaushik Gandhi and Keyur Kelkar
Player of the match: Abid Mushtaq (North Zone)

- North Zone won the toss and elected to bat.

=== Semifinals ===
30 August–1 September 2026
Semi Final 1
Scorecard

| Central Zone | v | East Zone |
| 266 (80.1 overs); Rinku Singh 60 (88); Abhijit Sarkar 3/38 (16.1 overs) | | 266 (57 overs); Vaibhav Sooryavanshi 92 (81); Harsh Dubey 4/66 (16 overs) |
| 158 (50.2 overs); Aman Mokhade 41 (89); Mukesh Kumar 4/44 (12 overs) | | 162/6 (39.3 overs); Vaibhav Sooryavanshi 40 (43); Harsh Dubey 4/53 (14 overs) |

East Zone won by 4 wickets
BCCI COE Ground 1, Bengaluru
Umpires: Saidharshan Kumar and Anish Sahasrabudhe
Player of the match: Mukesh Kumar (East Zone)

- East Zone won the toss and elected to field.
- While four days of play were scheduled for this First-class match, the match reached a result in three days.
- Md Kounain Quraishi (East Zone) made his First-class cricket debut.

30 August–2 September 2026
Semi Final 2
Scorecard

| North Zone | v | South Zone |
| 195 (59.1 overs); Qamran Iqbal 76 (182); Vidwath Kaverappa 4/66 (15 overs) | | 312 (100.3 overs); Tilak Varma 116* (250); Gurnoor Brar 4/88 (23 overs) |
| 297 (72.4 overs); Sanat Sangwan 76 (148); M. D. Nidheesh 5/56 (16.3 overs) | | 182/3 (43.1 overs); Tilak Varma 51* (79); Abid Mushtaq 2/55 (16 overs) |

South Zone won by 7 wickets
BCCI COE Ground 2, Bengaluru
Umpires: Parashar Joshi and Amit Rana
Player of the match: Tilak Varma (South Zone)

- North Zone won the toss and elected to bat.

=== Final ===
6–10 September 2026
Final
Scorecard

| East Zone | v | South Zone |
| 708 (163 overs); Ishan Kishan 270 (334); Tripurana Vijay 4/180 (42 overs) | | 336 (107.3 overs); Tilak Varma 99 (211); Mukesh Kumar 3/62 (19 overs) |
| 388/7d (99.2 overs); Md Kounain Quraishi 116* (190); M. D. Nidheesh 2/28 (9 overs) |

Match drawn (East Zone won on first innings lead)
M. A. Chidambaram Stadium, Chennai
Umpires: Rohan Pandit and Virender Sharma
Player of the match: Ishan Kishan (East Zone)

- East Zone won the toss and elected to bat.
- East Zone won their third Duleep Trophy title.
- Md Kounain Quraishi (East Zone) scored his first century in first-class cricket.

== Statistics ==
Highest Run Getters
| Rank | Player | Team | INN | Runs | AVG | HS | 100s | 50s |
|---|---|---|---|---|---|---|---|---|
| 1 | Ishan Kishan | East Zone | 5 | 409 | 102.25 | 270 | 1 | 1 |
| 2 | Tilak Varma | South Zone | 3 | 266 | 266.00 | 116* | 1 | 2 |
| 3 | Kumar Kushagra | East Zone | 5 | 224 | 44.80 | 101 | 1 | 1 |
| 4 | Sudip Gharami | East Zone | 3 | 193 | 38.60 | 146 | 1 | – |
| 5 | Vaibhav Sooryavanshi | East Zone | 5 | 192 | 38.40 | 92 | – | 1 |

Leading Wicket Takers
| Rank | Player | Team | INN | Wickets | BBI | AVG | ECO | 4W | 5W |
|---|---|---|---|---|---|---|---|---|---|
| 1 | Mukesh Kumar | East Zone | 5 | 12 | 4/44 | 14.91 | 3.03 | 1 | – |
| 1 | Abid Mushtaq | North Zone | 4 | 12 | 5/39 | 16.25 | 2.49 | 1 | 1 |
| 3 | Abhijit Sarkar | East Zone | 5 | 10 | 5/20 | 13.20 | 2.69 | – | 1 |
| 4 | M. D. Nidheesh | South Zone | 4 | 9 | 5/56 | 19.77 | 3.44 | – | 1 |
| 5 | Tanush Kotian | West Zone | 2 | 8 | 4/46 | 14.75 | 3.38 | 2 | – |
| 5 | Harsh Dubey | Central Zone | 2 | 8 | 4/53 | 14.87 | 3.96 | 2 | – |
