= 2002–03 Duleep Trophy =

- Dates: 12 March 2003 – 13 April 2003
- Administrator: BCCI
- Cricket format: First-class cricket
- Tournament format: Round-robin
- Champions: Elite Group C (1st title)
- Participants: 5
- Matches: 10
- Most runs: Sridharan Sriram (Elite A) (416)
- Most wickets: Narendra Hirwani (Plate B) (34)

The 2002–03 Duleep Trophy was the 42nd season of the Duleep Trophy. Instead of five zonal teams, five teams (Elite Group A, Elite Group B, Elite Group C, Plate Group A and Plate Group B) were formed based on the 2002–03 Ranji Trophy groups.

Elite Group C won the title by finishing first on the points table.

== Points table ==
Team	Matches	Won	Lost	Drawn (WF)	Drawn (LF)	Points	Quotient
Elite Group C	4	2	0	2	0	26	1.744
Plate Group B	4	1	0	1	2	19	1.248
Elite Group B	4	1	1	2	0	18	1.099
Elite Group A	4	1	0	0	3	17	1.032
Plate Group A	4	0	3	1	0	5	0.665
