= Duleep Trophy =

First-class cricket knockout championship in India

- Countries: India
- Administrator: BCCI
- Format: First-class cricket
- First edition: 1961–62
- Latest edition: 2026–27
- Tournament format: Round-robin or Knockouts
- Number of teams: various
- Current champion: East Zone (3rd title)
- Most successful: West Zone (19 titles)
- Most runs: Wasim Jaffer (2545)
- Most wickets: Narendra Hirwani (126)
- Website: BCCI

The Duleep Trophy is a domestic first-class cricket competition in India. Named after former cricketer Duleepsinhji, the competition has usually been contested by teams representing various geographical zones of India since the first tournament in 1961–62. There have been a few exceptions to the zonal format, such as the 2002–03 tournament, where five teams were formed based on Ranji Trophy groups, and the four editions held between 2016–17 and 2019–20, when the BCCI selected three teams called India Blue, Red and Green. The 2024-25 edition featured four teams named Team A, B, C and D, while the 2025–26 and 2026–27 editions reverted to a six-team zonal format.

== History ==
The competition was established by the BCCI in the 1961–62 season. The tournament was contested between the different geographical zones of India namely, North, South, East, West and Central. The inaugural tournament was won by West Zone who defeated South Zone in the final by ten wickets. In the 1962–63 season, four of the five teams except Central Zone included a West Indies Test cricketer as a part of the teams.

The original format was that the five teams played each other on a knock-out basis. From the 1993–94 season, the competition converted to a league format before moving back to the knock-out format for four seasons. The tournament again reverted to a league format for three seasons from 2000–01. For the 2002–03 season, the zonal teams were replaced by five teams representing respective Ranji Trophy groups but the format lasted only one season. From the 2003–04 season, the five original zonal teams competed along with a sixth guest team which was a touring foreign team. The first guest team was England A in 2003–04. From the 2009–10 season, the guest team was dropped, with the original five-team knockout tournament being used until the 2014–15 season.

The championship was not held in 2015–16 but returned to in 2016–17 with a new format where three teams chosen by the BCCI took part, designated as Blue, Green and Red. The teams played a round-robin tournament, with the top two advancing to the final. All games were staged as day-night games and used pink cricket balls. The trophy was cancelled for three seasons due to COVID-19 and the zonal format returned when it was re-started in 2022–23 with the original five zonal teams joined by a new North East Zone.

The 2024–25 format deviated from recent editions by featuring four teams: India A, India B, India C, and India D, instead of the traditional zonal teams. The tournament followed a round-robin format with no knockout stage. The team with the maximum points at the end of the round-robin stage won the tournament. The teams were composed of a mix of experienced and emerging players selected by national selectors.

Team	Captains
India A	Captained by Shubman Gill (later replaced by Mayank Agarwal due to international duties)
India B	Captained by Abhimanyu Easwaran
India C	Captained by Ruturaj Gaikwad
India D	Captained by Shreyas Iyer.

The 2026–27 edition, the tournament's 63rd, reverted to a six-team, single-elimination format contested between the original five zones and North East Zone, running from 23 August to 10 September 2026. Defending champions Central Zone and 2025–26 runners-up South Zone received byes directly to the semi-finals, while the remaining four zones played off in the quarter-finals. In the quarter-finals, North Zone beat West Zone by 52 runs, while East Zone beat North East Zone by an innings and 210 runs. East Zone then knocked out defending champions Central Zone by four wickets in the first semi-final, while South Zone beat North Zone by seven wickets in the second, setting up a final between East Zone and South Zone at the MA Chidambaram Stadium, Chennai, from 6 September 2026. Set at the MA Chidambaram Stadium in Chennai, the final ended in a draw after East Zone, sent in to bat, posted 708 in their first innings—built around captain Ishan Kishan's 270—and held a 372-run lead over South Zone's 336; East Zone were declared champions on first-innings lead, claiming their third title and their first since 2011–12.

== Composition of teams ==
Under the usual zonal system, each team is a composite of cricketers who play for the Ranji Trophy teams situated in that region of India:

- North Zone
  - Chandigarh
  - Delhi
  - Haryana
  - Himachal Pradesh
  - Jammu & Kashmir
  - Punjab
  - Services
- South Zone
  - Andhra Pradesh
  - Goa
  - Hyderabad
  - Karnataka
  - Kerala
  - Pondicherry
  - Tamil Nadu
- Central Zone
  - Chhattisgarh
  - Madhya Pradesh
  - Railways
  - Rajasthan
  - Uttarakhand
  - Uttar Pradesh
  - Vidarbha
- East Zone
  - Assam
  - Bihar
  - Bengal
  - Jharkhand
  - Odisha
  - Tripura
- North East Zone
  - Arunachal Pradesh
  - Manipur
  - Meghalaya
  - Mizoram
  - Nagaland
  - Sikkim
- West Zone
  - Baroda
  - Gujarat
  - Maharashtra
  - Mumbai
  - Saurashtra

== Winners ==
West Zone, with 19 trophies, is the most successful team in the competition.

Season	Final			
Season	Winner	Runner-up	Result	Final venue
1961–62	West Zone	South Zone	West Zone won by 10 wickets	Brabourne Stadium, Bombay
1962–63	West Zone	South Zone	West Zone won by an Innings and 20 runs	Eden Gardens, Calcutta
1963–64	West Zone & South Zone (shared)		Draw	Feroz Shah Kotla, Delhi
1964–65	West Zone	Central Zone	West Zone won by an innings and 89 runs	Brabourne Stadium, Bombay
1965–66	South Zone	Central Zone	South Zone won by an innings and 20 runs	MA Chidambaram Stadium, Madras
1966–67	South Zone	West Zone	Draw, South Zone won by first innings lead	Brabourne Stadium, Bombay
1967–68	South Zone	West Zone	Draw, South Zone won by first innings lead	Brabourne Stadium, Bombay
1968–69	West Zone	South Zone	Draw, West Zone won by first innings lead	Lal Bahadur Shastri Stadium, Hyderabad
1969–70	West Zone	North Zone	West Zone won by an innings and 81 runs	Sardar Vallabhbhai Patel Stadium, Ahmedabad
1970–71	South Zone	East Zone	South Zone won by 10 wickets	Brabourne Stadium, Bombay
1971–72	Central Zone	West Zone	Central Zone by 2 wickets	Central College Ground, Bangalore
1972–73	West Zone	Central Zone	West Zone won by an innings and 172 runs	Brabourne Stadium, Bombay
1973–74	North Zone	Central Zone	North Zone won by 76 runs	Brabourne Stadium, Bombay
1974–75	South Zone	West Zone	South Zone won by 9 wickets	Lal Bahadur Shastri Stadium, Hyderabad
1975–76	South Zone	North Zone	South Zone won by 37 runs	MA Chidambaram Stadium, Madras
1976–77	West Zone	North Zone	West Zone won by 9 wickets	Moti Bagh Stadium, Baroda
1977–78	West Zone	North Zone	Draw, West Zone won by first innings lead	Wankhede Stadium, Bombay
1978–79	North Zone	West Zone	Draw, North Zone won by first innings lead	Feroz Shah Kotla, Delhi
1979–80	North Zone	West Zone	North Zone won by 104 runs	Wankhede Stadium, Bombay
1980–81	West Zone	East Zone	Draw, West Zone won by first innings lead	Eden Gardens, Calcutta
1981–82	West Zone	East Zone	Draw, West Zone won by first innings lead	Brabourne Stadium, Bombay
1982–83	North Zone	South Zone	North Zone won by 8 wickets	Wankhede Stadium, Bombay
1983–84	North Zone	West Zone	Draw, North Zone won by first innings lead	Barabati Stadium, Cuttack
1984–85	South Zone	North Zone	South Zone won by 73 runs	Feroz Shah Kotla, Delhi
1985–86	West Zone	South Zone	West Zone by 9 wickets	M.Chinnaswamy Stadium, Bangalore
1986–87	South Zone	West Zone	Draw, South Zone won by first innings lead	Wankhede Stadium, Bombay
1987–88	North Zone	West Zone	Draw, North Zone won by first innings lead	Jayanti Stadium, Bhilai
1988–89	North Zone & West Zone (shared)		Draw	Feroz Shah Kotla, Delhi
1989–90	South Zone	Central Zone	South Zone won by 322 runs	Gymkhana Ground, Secunderabad
1990–91	North Zone	West Zone	Draw, North Zone won by first innings lead	Keenan Stadium, Jamshedpur
1991–92	North Zone	West Zone	North Zone won by 236 runs	Sardar Vallabhbhai Patel Stadium, Valsad
1992–93	North Zone	Central Zone	Draw, North Zone won by first innings lead	Lal Bahadur Shastri Stadium, Hyderabad
1993–94	North Zone	West Zone	Round Robin	NA
1994–95	North Zone	South Zone	Round Robin	NA
1995–96	South Zone	Central Zone	Round Robin	NA
1996–97	Central Zone	South Zone	Central Zone won by 161 runs	Punjab Cricket Association Stadium, Mohali
1997–98	Central Zone & West Zone (shared)		Draw	MA Chidambaram Stadium, Chennai
1998–99	Central Zone	West Zone	Central Zone won by 122 runs	N2 Stadium, Aurangabad
1999–2000	North Zone	West Zone	Draw, North Zone won by first innings lead	Eden Gardens, Kolkata
2000–01	North Zone	Central Zone	Round Robin	NA
2001–02	West Zone	North Zone	Round Robin	NA
2002–03	Elite C	Plate Group B	Round Robin	NA
2003–04	North Zone	East Zone	North Zone won by 59 runs	Punjab Cricket Association Stadium, Mohali
2004–05	Central Zone	North Zone	Central Zone won by nine wickets	Vidarbha Cricket Association Stadium, Nagpur
2005–06	West Zone	East Zone	West Zone won by five wickets	Sardar Patel Stadium, Ahmedabad
2006–07	North Zone	Sri Lanka A	North Zone won by eight wickets	Eden Gardens, Kolkata
2007–08	North Zone	West Zone	North Zone won by six wickets	Wankhede Stadium, Mumbai
2008–09	West Zone	South Zone	West Zone won by 274 runs	MA Chidambaram Stadium, Chennai
2009–10	West Zone	South Zone	West Zone won by three wickets	Lal Bahadur Shastri Stadium, Hyderabad
2010–11	South Zone	North Zone	South Zone won by seven wickets	ACA-VDCA Stadium, Visakhapatnam
2011–12	East Zone	Central Zone	East Zone won by an innings and 20 runs	Holkar Cricket Stadium, Indore
2012–13	East Zone	Central Zone	Draw, East Zone won by first innings lead	M. A. Chidambaram Stadium, Chennai
2013–14	North Zone & South Zone (shared)		Draw	Jawaharlal Nehru Stadium, Kochi
2014–15	Central Zone	South Zone	Central Zone won by 9 runs	Feroz Shah Kotla Ground, Delhi
2016–17	India Blue	India Red	India Blue won by 355 runs	Greater Noida Sports Complex Ground, Greater Noida
2017–18	India Red	India Blue	India Red won by 163 runs	Lucknow International Cricket Stadium, Lucknow
2018–19	India Blue	India Red	India Blue won by an innings and 187 runs	NPR College Ground, Dindigul
2019–20	India Red	India Green	India Red won by an innings and 38 runs	M. Chinnaswamy Stadium, Bangalore
2022–23	West Zone	South Zone	West Zone won by 294 runs	SNR College Cricket Ground, Coimbatore
2023	South Zone	West Zone	South Zone won by 75 runs	M. Chinnaswamy Stadium, Bangalore
2024–25	India A	India C	India A won by 132 runs	Rural Development Trust Stadium 'B', Anantapur
2025–26	Central Zone	South Zone	Central Zone won by 6 wickets	BCCI Centre of Excellence Ground, Bengaluru
2026–27	East Zone	South Zone	Draw, East Zone won by first innings lead	MA Chidambaram Stadium, Chennai

== Statistics ==
=== Appearances by team ===
Team	Matches	Win	Loss	Draw	Last appearance
West Zone	115	58	35	22	2026
North Zone	114	53	34	27	2026
South Zone	111	47	40	24	2026
Central Zone	104	28	46	30	2026
East Zone	93	21	46	26	2026
India Red	12	4	2	6	2019
India Blue	11	2	1	8	2019
India Green	9	0	3	6	2019
Elite Group A	4	1	0	3	2003
Elite Group B	4	1	1	2	2003
Elite Group C	4	1	0	3	2003
Plate Group A	4	0	3	1	2003
Plate Group B	4	1	0	3	2003
England A	4	1	3	0	2008
Sri Lanka A	3	2	1	0	2006
India A	3	2	1	0	2024
India B	3	1	1	1	2024
India C	3	1	1	1	2024
India D	3	1	2	0	2024
Bangladesh Board XI	2	0	1	1	2005
Zimbabwe Board XI	2	0	2	0	2005
North East Zone	4	0	2	2	2026
Source: ESPNcricinfo; updated for the 2025–26 season and the completed 2026–27 tournament, including the final

=== Finals appearances by team ===
Team	Wins	Appearances	Win %	Last win
West Zone	19	33	57.57	2022/23
North Zone	18	26	65.38	2013/14
South Zone	13	25	52.00	2023
Central Zone	7	17	41.18	2025/26
East Zone	3	8	37.50	2026/27
India Blue	2	3	66.67	2018/19
India Red	2	4	50.00	2019/20
Elite C	1	1	100.00	2002/03
Plate B	0	1	0.00	–
Sri Lanka A	0	1	0.00	–
India Green	0	1	0.00	–

Note: The Wins include the shared trophies and the win percentage counts shared as half a win.

=== Records and statistics ===
Batting
Most runs	Wasim Jaffer	West Zone, Elite B	2545
Highest score	Raman Lamba	North Zone	320 v West Zone (1987/88)
Most runs in a tournament	Raman Lamba	North Zone	659 (1987/88)
Highest average	Raman Lamba	North Zone	86.25
Most ducks	Ashok Dinda	East Zone, India Green, India Red	8
Most ducks	EAS Prasanna	South Zone	8
Most ducks	Ashok Mankad	West Zone	8
Most ducks	Narendra Hirwani	Central Zone, Plate B	8
Most hundreds	Anshuman Gaekwad	West Zone	9
Most fifties (and over)	Wasim Jaffer	West Zone, Elite B	21
Highest partnership	VVS Laxman & Rahul Dravid (3rd wicket)	South Zone	409 v West Zone
Bowling
Most wickets	Narendra Hirwani	Central Zone, Plate B	126
Best bowling figures in an innings	Debasis Mohanty	East Zone	10/46 v South Zone
Best bowling figures in a match	Debasis Mohanty	East Zone	14/91 v South Zone
Most wickets in a series	Narendra Hirwani	Plate Group B	34 (2002/03)
Most 5 wickets in an innings	Narendra Hirwani	Central Zone, Plate B	8
Most 10 wickets in a match	Narendra Hirwani	Central Zone, Plate B	2
Fielding
Most dismissals (wicket-keeper)	Parthiv Patel	West Zone, Elite C, India Green	88 (68 catches and 20 stumpings)
Most dismissals in a match (wicket-keeper)	Sameer Dighe	West Zone	10 (6 catches and 4 stumpings)
Most catches (fielder)	Wasim Jaffer	West Zone, Elite B	41
Team
Highest score	North Zone	v West Zone	868 (1987/88)
Lowest score	North Zone	v South Zone	48 (1961)
Lowest score	East Zone	v South Zone	48 (1969)
Individual
Most matches	Mohinder Amarnath	North Zone	31 (1969–1988)
Most matches as captain	Hanumant Singh	Central Zone	15 (1966–1975)
Most matches as captain	Srinivasaraghavan Venkataraghavan	South Zone	15 (1970–1979)
Most matches as an umpire	Suresh Shastri		13 (1993–2013)

=== Most runs ===
Player	Team(s)	Span	Mat	Inns	Runs	Ave	HS	100	50
Wasim Jaffer	Elite B, West Zone	1997–2013	30	54	2545	55.32	173*	8	13
Vikram Rathour	North Zone	1993–2002	25	45	2265	51.47	249	6	11
Anshuman Gaekwad	West Zone	1974–1987	26	42	2004	52.73	216	4	2
Ajay Sharma	North Zone	1984–1997	26	37	1961	57.67	202	7	9
Akash Chopra	Central Zone, North Zone, Elite A	1997–2011	24	43	1918	53.27	205*	6	8
Source: ESPNcricinfo

=== Most wickets ===
Player	Team(s)	Span	Mat	Inns	Wkts	Ave	Econ	SR	BBI	BBM	5	10
Narendra Hirwani	Central Zone, Plate B	1987–2004	29	45	126	34.12	2.99	68.4	7/129	12/200	8	2
Sairaj Bahutule	West Zone, Elite B	1993–2006	30	48	112	26.76	2.84	56.4	6/41	9/114	4	0
B. S. Chandrasekhar	South Zone	1963–1979	24	41	99	24.30	2.81	51.7	8/80	10/183	7	1
Source: ESPNcricinfo

== Broadcasters ==
Viacom18 holds the media rights to domestic tournaments, including the Duleep Trophy, from 2023 to 2028; Sports18 is the official television broadcaster, while matches are also streamed for free on the JioCinema platform.
