= Ajit Pai (cricketer) =

Indian cricketer (born 1945)

Personal information
- Full name: Ajit Manohar Pai
- Born: 28 April 1945 (age 81); Bombay, Maharashtra, British India
- Height: 5 ft 11 1/2 in (1.82 m)
- Batting: Left-handed
- Bowling: Right-arm fast-medium

International information
- National side: India
- Only Test (cap 120): 25 September 1969 v New Zealand

Career statistics
Competition	Tests	First-class
Matches	1	35
Runs scored	10	872
Batting average	5.00	24.22
100s/50s	0/0	0/5
Top score	9	91
Balls bowled	114	4924
Wickets	2	85
Bowling average	15.50	25.21
5 wickets in innings	0	4
10 wickets in match	0	1
Best bowling	2/29	7/42
Catches/stumpings	0/–	39/–
- Source: ESPNcricinfo, 30 July 2020

Ajit Manohar Pai (born 28 April 1945) is a former Indian cricketer who played in one Test match in 1969.

== Cricket career ==
A tall opening bowler and useful lower-order batsman, Pai made his debut for Bombay in the Ranji Trophy in the 1968–69 season. After taking 11 wickets in his first three first-class matches he was selected to represent West Zone in the Duleep Trophy. He helped each team to the championship and finished the season with 129 runs at an average of 25.80 and 23 wickets at 23.21.

In September 1969 he took 7 for 42 for West Zone against Central Zone in the Duleep Trophy and was selected to open the bowling for India in the First Test against New Zealand later that month. He took two wickets and India won, but for the Second Test the selectors decided to use the all-rounders Rusi Surti and Syed Abid Ali to open the bowling and strengthened the spin attack with Srinivasaraghavan Venkataraghavan. Again he helped West Zone and Bombay win their respective championships in 1969–70.

Pai did not play any further matches in the Duleep Trophy, but in 1970-71 he had an outstanding match for Bombay against Saurashtra in the Ranji Trophy. Batting at number seven, he made 91 out of a Bombay total of 265, then took 5 for 22 and 6 for 30 to take Bombay to victory by an innings and 82 runs. Once again he played in the Bombay side that won the Ranji Trophy.

Pai's bowling form fell away after 1970–71, but he played in two more Ranji Trophy-winning Bombay sides, in 1974-75 and 1975–76, seasons in which his batting (310 runs at 28.11) and catching (18 catches in 10 matches) were more prominent. The 1975–76 victory in the final over Bihar was his last first-class match.

== Later life ==
Pai worked as an architect for the Bank of Baroda.
