= Aurangabad District Cricket Association Stadium =

Cricket ground in Aurangabad, Maharashtra, India

Coordinates: 19.8703455°N 75.3635515°E

N2 Stadium
- Aurangabad District Cricket Association Ground; City and Industrial Development Corporation Stadium
- Interactive map of N2 Stadium

Ground information
- Location: CIDCO, Aurangabad, Maharashtra
- Country: India
- Establishment: 1998
- Capacity: 20,000
- Owner: Aurangabad District Cricket Association
- Operator: Aurangabad District Cricket Association
- Tenants: Maharashtra cricket team Maharashtra Premier League

International information
- Only WODI: 7 December 2003: India v New Zealand
- As of 8 December 2019; Source: ESPNcricinfo

N2 Stadium or Aurangabad District Cricket Association Ground or City and Industrial Development Corporation Stadium is cricket stadium in city of CIDCO, Aurangabad, Maharashtra. The ground has hosted domestic and couple of women's international cricket matches. As of 3 March 2023 two Duleep trophy and two Ranji trophy matches held here.

In 2003, a New Zealand women versus India women ODI happened here. The match was won by India women's by 9 wickets with Indian opener Jaya Sharma scoring 96.

In 2012, Aurangabad District Cricket Association decided to redevelop the stadium into 20,000 to 25,000 seater stadium with boundaries of 63 metres and floodlights as well. Also redevelopment of VIP Box, Press Box, Parking, Gym, Restaurant, Shopping center etc.

== First-Class Matches Hosted ==
First-Class Records and Statistics
Matches	Team A	Team B	Winner	Result	Season
1	West Zone	Central Zone	Central Zone	By 122 runs	1998
2	Maharashtra	Services		Drawn	2003
3	Maharashtra	Assam	Maharashtra	By an innings and 46 runs	2004
4	West Zone	Central Zone	West Zone	By 7 wickets	1998

== Women's ODI Hosted ==
Match Statistics
Team A	Team B	Winner	Margin	Season	Scorecards
India women's	New Zealand women's	India women's	By 9 wickets	2003	Scorecard
