= Sudhakar Adhikari =

Indian cricketer (1939–2022)

Personal information
- Full name: Sudhakar Gajanan Adhikari
- Born: 11 October 1939; Bombay, British India
- Died: 29 July 2022 (aged 82)
- Batting: Right-handed
- Role: Opening batsman

Domestic team information
- Years: Team
- 1959/60–1966/67: Bombay
- 1960/61–1963/64: West Zone

Career statistics
Competition	First-class
Matches	65
Runs scored	3,779
Batting average	40.63
100s/50s	11/18
Top score	192
Balls bowled	348
Wickets	5
Bowling average	55.00
5 wickets in innings	0
10 wickets in match	0
Best bowling	1/22
Catches/stumpings	21/–
- Source: Cricinfo, 6 October 2024

Sudhakar Gajanan Adhikari (11 October 1939 – 29 July 2022) was an Indian cricketer who played first-class cricket from 1959–60 to 1970–71, mostly for Bombay in the Ranji Trophy and West Zone in the Duleep Trophy.

Adhikari was a technically-sound opening batsman who came close to Test selection for India in the early 1960s. After representing Bombay University in the Rohinton Baria Trophy, he was included in the Indian Universities team to play the touring Australians in 1959–60. He then made his Ranji Trophy debut, scored 134 against Baroda in his second match, and shortly afterwards played in Bombay's victory in the final. He was selected to play for Indian Starlets on their tour of Pakistan later that season, where he scored a century against Lahore in the first match.

Adhikari made the most of his opportunities when Bombay's Test players were absent, scoring 192 against Maharashtra in the Ranji Trophy in 1960–61. In its summary of that season, Wisden predicted a bright future for him. He played in Bombay's victorious Ranji Trophy team and West Zone’s victorious Duleep Trophy team in the 1961–62 season. He scored a century when West Zone won the final by an innings in 1962–63.

Adhikari's form fell away in the mid-1960s. In April 1966, in one of several first-class matches he was selected to play in to raise money for the National Defence Fund, he was the second batsman dismissed when Sadanand Mohol took four wickets in four balls.

Adhikari died in July 2022, at the age of 82.
