= Vijay Mehra (Indian cricketer) =

Indian cricketer (1938–2006)

Personal information
- Full name: Vijay Laxman Mehra
- Born: 12 March 1938; Amritsar, British India
- Died: 25 August 2006 (aged 68); New Delhi, India
- Batting: Right-handed
- Bowling: Right-arm bowler

International information
- National side: India
- Test debut (cap 78): 2 December 1955 v New Zealand
- Last Test: 21 January 1964 v England

Career statistics
Competition	Test	First-class
Matches	8	109
Runs scored	329	5,614
Batting average	25.30	34.44
100s/50s	0/2	13/27
Top score	62	167*
Balls bowled	36	1,563
Wickets	0	26
Bowling average	–	31.00
5 wickets in innings	–	1
10 wickets in match	–	0
Best bowling	–	5/23
Catches/stumpings	1/–	56/–
- Source: , 2 January 2015

Vijay Laxman Mehra (12 March 1938 – 25 August 2006) was an Indian cricketer who played in eight Test matches from 1955 to 1964.
