= Jacob Martin (cricketer) =

Indian cricketer (born 1972)

Personal information
- Full name: Jacob Joseph Martin
- Born: 11 May 1972 (age 54); Vadodara, Gujarat, India
- Batting: Right-handed
- Bowling: Right-arm offbreak
- Role: Batsman

Domestic team information
- Years: Team
- 1991–2009: Baroda
- 2002–2003: Railways
- 2008–2009: Assam

Career statistics
Competition	ODI	FC	LA
Matches	10	138	101
Runs scored	158	9,192	2,948
Batting average	22.57	46.65	39.30
100s/50s	0/0	23/47	3/20
Top score	39	271	133
Balls bowled	–	618	373
Wickets	–	10	9
Bowling average	–	45.90	31.44
5 wickets in innings	–	1	0
10 wickets in match	–	0	0
Best bowling	–	5/51	2/15
Catches/stumpings	6/–	120/4	37/2
- Source: ESPNcricinfo, 20 April 2007

Jacob Joseph Martin (born 11 May 1972) is an Indian cricketer. He is a right-handed middle-order batsman. Martin has appeared 10 times for India at One Day International (ODI) level at the turn of the 21st century. He captained Baroda cricket team in the Indian domestic circuit.

== Domestic career ==
Martin made his first-class debut for Baroda in the 1991–92 season in the Ranji Trophy. In his debut match, he took 5 wickets in an innings against Gujarat and scored a 50. However, Martin came to be regarded as a specialist batsman and an occasional part-time spin bowler — to date, he has a total of 9 first-class wickets including the 5 he took on debut.

He has played for Baroda throughout his career except during the 2002–03 season when he played for Railways. He has also captained Baroda on a regular basis from the 2000–01 season onwards, winning the Ranji Trophy in 2000–01 and finishing as runner-up the following season.

Martin's most prolific season was in 1998–99 when he scored 1037 runs for Baroda in the Ranji Trophy at an average of 103.70 including 5 centuries. The feat made him only the sixth player to have scored over 1000 runs in a Ranji Trophy season, and helped to earn him selection for the India national cricket team.

== International career ==
Martin made his ODI debut against the West Indies cricket team in September 1999, and also played in the subsequent triangular ODI series in Australia against Australia national cricket team and Pakistan national cricket team in January 2000. However, he was unable to reproduce his domestic form and did not play again for India after 2001.

== Post-playing career ==
He was named as head coach of Baroda cricket team for 2016–17 Ranji Trophy season.

He was arrested in 2011 in Delhi in connection with a 2003 human-trafficking case.

In December 2018, Martin was involved in a road accident and was placed on life support.

Martin is now retired and runs outlets of laundry and dry-cleaning brand, UClean, in Gujarat.
