= Sudhir Naik =

Indian cricketer (1945–2023)

Personal information
- Full name: Sudhir Sakharam Naik
- Born: 21 February 1945; Bombay, Bombay Presidency, British India
- Died: 5 April 2023 (aged 78); Mumbai, Maharashtra, India
- Batting: Right-handed
- Role: Batsman

International information
- National side: India
- Test debut (cap 132): 4 July 1974 v England
- Last Test: 27 December 1974 v West Indies
- ODI debut (cap 6): 13 July 1974 v England
- Last ODI: 15 July 1974 v England

Career statistics
Competition	Test	ODI
Matches	3	2
Runs scored	141	38
Batting average	23.50	19.00
100s/50s	0/1	0/0
Top score	77	20
Catches/stumpings	0/–	0/–
- Source: CricInfo, 4 February 2006

Sudhir Sakharam Naik (21 February 1945 – 5 April 2023) was an Indian cricketer who played in three Test matches and two One Day Internationals in 1974 in the Indian cricket team. A courageous right-hand opening batsman, Sudhir Naik went as one of the candidates for the opening batsman's slot on the 1974 tour of England. He did well in the first-class matches, scoring 730 runs (40.55) and forced his way into the team for the final Test at Edgbaston. Out for 4 in the first innings, Naik batted in gritty fashion in a losing cause in the second innings to top-score with 77. Back home he played in two more Tests against West Indies. This turned out to be his last season played for India.

For Bombay, however, Naik in the Ranji Trophy scored 2687 runs (40.10) with a highest score of 200 not out against Baroda in 1973–74. He led Bombay to an unexpected Ranji Trophy triumph in 1970–71. It was a depleted side with the stars being away with the Indian team in the West Indies. But Naik making adroit use of the limited resources proved himself to be an astute captain.

Naik had an extensive career in the domestic Indian cricket in varied capacities of cricketer, coach and ground-curator.

Naik started his career by playing for Bombay University and later went on to captain the Tata Oil Mills team where he was an employee. He was a rare combination of a cricketer and an organic chemist with first class in MSc in Organic Chemistry from Ruparel College in Bombay.

Besides playing for India, he also captained Bombay in the Ranji Trophy for several years. He remained active in the game as the coach at his own National Cricket Club, Mumbai which has produced star cricketers for India like Zaheer Khan and Wasim Jaffer and many like Rajesh Pawar, Raju Sutar and Paras Mhambrey who are past and present players for Mumbai.

From 2005, Naik served as the ground in-charge at Wankhede Stadium, where he was responsible for preparing the pitch and outfield for matches. This included the pitch and outfield used for the 2011 Cricket World Cup final.

Naik was overlooking the preparation of grounds and pitches of the west zone in the capacity of West Zone In-charge of BCCI's Ground and Pitch Committee.

Naik died on 5 April 2023, at the age of 78.
