= Zulfiqar Parkar =

Indian cricketer (born 1957)

Personal information
- Full name: Zulfiqar Parkar
- Born: 22 November 1957; Kaluste, India
- Batting: Right-handed
- Role: Wicket-keeper
- Source: ESPNcricinfo, 24 November 2016

Zulfiqar Parkar (born 22 November 1957) is an Indian first-class cricketer who represented Mumbai (then Bombay). He made his first-class debut for Mumbai in the 1977-78 Ranji Trophy on 10 December 1977.
