= Yarpur, Nalanda =

Yarpur Deeppur
- village
- Location in Bihar, India
- Coordinates: 25°16′52″N 85°15′41″E
- Country: India
- State: Bihar
- District: Nalanda
- Subdistrict: Hilsa

Population (2011)
  - Total: 1,597
  - Rank: 89

Languages
  - Official: Magadhi, Hindi
- Time zone: UTC+5:30 (IST)
- PIN: 06111
- Vehicle registration: BR
- Nearest city: Patna, Biharsharif, Nalanda

Yarpur is a village in Hilsa block, Nalanda district, Bihar, India. It is 6 kilometres (3.7 mi) from Hilsa and 1 kilometre (0.62 mi) from Yogipur. It lies to the west of Gulni village. The population was 1,597 at the 2011 Indian census.
