= Hrishikesh Kanitkar =

Indian cricketer (born 1974)

Personal information
- Full name: Hrishikesh Hemant Kanitkar
- Born: 14 November 1974 (age 51); Pune, Maharashtra, India
- Batting: Left-handed
- Bowling: Right-arm offbreak
- Role: All-rounder
- Relatives: Hemant Kanitkar (father)

International information
- National side: India (1997 - 2000)
- Test debut (cap 224): 26 December 1999 v Australia
- Last Test: 2 January 2000 v Australia
- ODI debut (cap 109): 7 December 1997 v Sri Lanka
- Last ODI: 30 January 2000 v Australia
- ODI shirt no.: 14

Career statistics
Competition	Test	ODI	FC	LA
Matches	2	34	146	128
Runs scored	74	339	10,400	3,526
Batting average	18.50	17.84	52.26	35.26
100s/50s	0/0	0/1	33/46	6/21
Top score	45	57	290	133
Balls bowled	6	1,006	7,753	3,476
Wickets	0	17	74	70
Bowling average	–	47.23	47.91	39.64
5 wickets in innings	–	0	0	0
10 wickets in match	–	0	0	0
Best bowling	–	2/22	3/21	4/35
Catches/stumpings	0/–	14/–	85/–	49/–
- Source: ESPNcricinfo, 20 February 2016

Hrishikesh Hemant Kanitkar (born 14 November 1974) is a former Indian cricketer, who briefly played Tests and ODIs.

He is a left-handed batsman and a right-arm offbreak bowler. When he retired in 2015, he was one of only three batsmen to have scored over 8000 runs in the Ranji Trophy and also the only captain in Ranji Trophy history to lift both the Elite and Plate league titles.

== Domestic career ==
He made his first-class debut against the Sanjay Manjrekar led Mumbai cricket team at Indira Gandhi Stadium, Solapur, which was drawn in the 1994–95 Ranji Trophy.

He scored prolifically for the Maharashtra cricket team in the Ranji Trophy and brought himself into contention for national selection. Although off the international scene for quite some time, Kanitkar joined the Brentwood Cricket Club in Essex for the 2006 season. During this season he enjoyed the English conditions, scoring over 1000 runs in the season with an average of 76. His highest score of 290* was against Bihar in the 2002-03 Ranji season in Tata Digwadih Stadium, where Indian would-be captain MS Dhoni was the wicket-keeper.

Kanitkar played for the Rajasthan Ranji team as a senior player. In the 2010-11 Ranji Trophy season, he captained the Rajasthan team and led them to their maiden Ranji Trophy triumph after defeating Baroda in the finals.

In December 2012, he became the 27th cricketer to play 100 Ranji Trophy matches.

In July 2015 Kanitkar announced his retirement from cricket.

== International career ==
He is best remembered for hitting a four when India required 3 runs to win from 2 balls in the Silver Jubilee Independence Cup final at Dhaka, against Pakistan. He played only a few ODIs and scored only one half-century in the format (which came in his third ODI innings against the Australia in Kochi).

He only had a brief international test career in which he played in two tests in 1999/00 both against Australian cricket team at Melbourne and Sydney. He scored 11 and 45 in a Boxing Day Test at Melbourne Cricket Ground as the India lost by 180 runs. In his second Test, Kanitkar scored 10 and 8 as India was defeated by an innings and 141 runs and Kanitkar was never selected in the Test team again.

== Coaching career ==
In 2011, Kanitkar was appointed as an assistant coach of Kochi Tuskers Kerala but walked out of the contract even before the IPL season began. This was due to disputes with the owners.

Kanitkar was named as head coach of the Goa cricket team for 2015–16 Ranji Trophy season with a one-year contract.

Kanitkar then became the head coach of the Tamil Nadu cricket team from 2016 - 2019. He excelled as a coach for Tamil Nadu and was credited with turning around the fortunes of the team. Along with Lakshmipati Balaji, as the full-time bowling coach, Kanitkar was credited with making a major change in the team.

In the run-up to ICC Women's T20 World Cup 2023, Hrishikesh Kanitkar was named the Stand-In Chief Coach of the India women's national cricket team. He is the current head coach of India national under-19 cricket team.

== Personal life ==
He is the son of former Indian wicket-keeper Hemant Kanitkar who also played in two Tests.
