= Central College Ground, Bengaluru =

Multi-purpose college ground in Bangalore, Karnataka, India

Central College Ground
- Full name: Central College Ground
- Location: Bangalore, Karnataka
- Owner: Central College of Bangalore
- Operator: Central College of Bangalore
- Capacity: n/a

Construction
- Groundbreaking: 1935
- Opened: 1935

Website
- ESPNcricinfo

Central College Ground is a multi purpose ground in Bangalore, Karnataka, India. The ground is mainly used for organizing matches of football, cricket, rugby, American football, athletics, basketball, kabaddi and other sports. The ground has hosted 52 First-class matches from 1941 when Mysore cricket team played against Hyderabad cricket team.

The ground has hosted two List A matches 2002 when Andhra cricket team played against Kerala cricket team and again in 2002 when Tamil Nadu cricket team played against Kerala cricket team but since then the ground has hosted non-first-class matches.
