= Hemant Kanitkar =

Indian cricketer (1942–2015)

Personal information
- Full name: Hemant Shamsunder Kanitkar
- Born: 8 December 1942; Amravati, British India
- Died: 9 June 2015 (aged 72); Pune, Maharashtra, India
- Batting: Right-handed

International information
- National side: India
- Test debut (cap 133): 22 November 1974 v West Indies
- Last Test: 11 December 1974 v West Indies

Career statistics
Competition	Test	First-class
Matches	2	87
Runs scored	111	5,006
Batting average	27.75	42.78
100s/50s	0/1	13/23
Top score	65	250
Balls bowled	–	82
Wickets	–	1
Bowling average	–	54.00
5 wickets in innings	–	0
10 wickets in match	–	0
Best bowling	–	1/29
Catches/stumpings	0/–	70/20
- Source: ESPNcricinfo, 15 April 2022

Hemant Shamsundar Kanitkar (8 December 1942 – 9 June 2015) was an Indian cricketer who played in two Test matches in 1974. His son, Hrishikesh Kanitkar represented India in 1999 – 2000.
