= P. K. Belliappa =

Indian cricketer (1940–2020)

Personal information
- Full name: Patamada Karambiah Belliappa
- Born: 24 March 1940; Mysore, Kingdom of Mysore, British India
- Died: 19 February 2020 (aged 79); Bangalore, Karnataka, India
- Batting: Right-handed
- Role: Wicketkeeper-batsman

Domestic team information
- Years: Team
- 1959/60–1973/74: Tamil Nadu

Career statistics
Competition	First-class
Matches	94
Runs scored	4,060
Batting average	29.42
100s/50s	4/22
Top score	141
Balls bowled	120
Wickets	2
Bowling average	50.00
5 wickets in innings	0
10 wickets in match	0
Best bowling	2/37
Catches/stumpings	93/46
- Source: ESPNcricinfo, 10 May 2025

Patamada Karambiah Belliappa (24 March 1940 – 19 February 2020) was an Indian cricketer. He played in 94 first-class matches for Tamil Nadu from 1959 to 1974, scoring more than 4,000 runs and captaining the side.

In January 1963, Belliappa scored 104 runs for South Zone against the Marylebone Cricket Club (MCC), during England's tour to India. His highest score of 141 came in 1967–68, when as captain, opening batsman and wicket-keeper he led Madras to a 279-run victory over Madhya Pradesh in a Ranji Trophy quarter-final.
