= Yajurvindra Singh =

Indian cricketer (born 1952)

Personal information
- Born: 1 August 1952 (age 74); Rajkot, Gujarat, India
- Batting: Right-handed
- Bowling: Right-arm medium

International information
- National side: India (1977–1979)
- Test debut (cap 140): 28 January 1977 v England
- Last Test: 11 September 1979 v Australia

Career statistics
Competition	Test	First-class
Matches	4	78
Runs scored	109	3,765
Batting average	18.16	42.30
100s/50s	0/0	9/18
Top score	43*	214
Balls bowled	120	1,552
Wickets	0	50
Bowling average	–	31.03
5 wickets in innings	–	2
10 wickets in match	–	1
Best bowling	–	7/20
Catches/stumpings	11/–	83/–
- Source: CricInfo, 10 May 2020

Yajurvindra Singh (born 1 August 1952) is a former Indian cricketer who played in four Test matches from 1977 to 1979. He is from the erstwhile princely family of Bilkha, in Junagadh district in Saurashtra. Yajurvindra Singh, known as 'Sunny' since childhood, studied at the elite Rajkumar College in Rajkot, where he captained his School Team at the same time that Karsan Ghavri, who hailed from Rajkot, and who eventually went on to play for the Indian team, captained the Virani High School team. The two often played against each other at local school fixtures.

Yajurvindra became a co-holder of two Test fielding records when on Test debut he took five catches in an innings (first done by Vic Richardson in 1936), and seven in a match (first achieved by Greg Chappell in 1974). Aiden Markram now holds the record for nine catches in a Test but Yajurvindra remains a co-holder of the innings record.
