= Salim Durani =

Afghan-born Indian cricketer (1934–2023)

- Salim Durani

Personal information
- Full name: Salim Durani
- Born: 11 December 1934 near Khyber Pass, (Note: While cricket reference books and websites list Durani's birth place at Kabul, Durani stated in interviews that his birthplace is near Khyber Pass.) Afghanistan
- Died: 2 April 2023 (aged 88); Jamnagar, Gujarat, India
- Batting: Left-handed
- Bowling: Slow left-arm orthodox
- Role: All-rounder
- Relatives: Abdul Aziz Durrani (father)

International information
- National side: India (1960–1973)
- Test debut (cap 95): 1 January 1960 v Australia
- Last Test: 6 February 1973 v England

Domestic team information
- Years: Team
- 1953: Saurashtra
- 1954–1956: Gujarat
- 1956–1978: Rajasthan

Career statistics
Competition	Test	First-class
Matches	29	170
Runs scored	1,202	8,545
Batting average	25.04	33.37
100s/50s	1/7	14/45
Top score	104	137*
Balls bowled	6,446	28,130
Wickets	74	484
Bowling average	35.42	26.09
5 wickets in innings	3	21
10 wickets in match	1	2
Best bowling	6/73	8/99
Catches/stumpings	14/–	144/4
- Source: Cricinfo, 12 June 2013

Salim Durani (Pashto: سليم عزيز دراني;; 11 December 1934 – 2 April 2023) was an Afghan-born Indian cricketer who played in 29 Test matches from 1960 to 1973. An all-rounder, Durani was a slow left-arm orthodox bowler and a left-handed batsman famous for his six-hitting prowess. He was the only Indian Test cricketer to have been born in Afghanistan. He was the first cricketer to win an Arjuna Award. In 2011, he was awarded the C. K. Nayudu Lifetime Achievement Award, the highest honour bestowed by the Indian cricket board on a former player.

== Early life ==
Salim Durani was born in a Pashtun family in Afghanistan. His father Abdul Aziz Durani was a professional cricketer. Impressed by his wicket-keeping and batting performances for Nawanagar, (present day Jamnagar), in their tour of Karachi in 1935, Abdul Aziz was offered a job as a sub-inspector by the then Jam Sahib Digvijaysinhji Ranjitsinhji, which was when the Durani family settled in Jamnagar. After India's partition in 1947, Aziz moved to Pakistan, while his family stayed in Jamnagar. Future Pakistan national cricketer Hanif Mohammad was Aziz's student there.

Salim Durani left Kabul along with his parents when he was three years old.

== Cricket career ==
Durani was the hero of India's series victory against England in 1961–62. He took 8 and 10 wickets in their wins at Kolkata and Chennai, respectively. Also, a decade later, he would be instrumental in India's maiden victory against the West Indies at Port of Spain, taking the wickets of Clive Lloyd and Gary Sobers.

In his 50 Test innings, he made just one century, 104 against the West Indies in 1962. He played for Gujarat, Rajasthan and Saurashtra in first-class cricket. He made 14 hundreds in first-class cricket and managed 8,545 runs at 33.37. Durani had a special rapport with the spectators, who once agitated when he was dropped from the team for the Kanpur Test in 1973, turned up with placards and slogans such as, "No Durani, no test!"

As the only Afghanistan-born Indian test cricketer, he was present during the historic India vs Afghanistan test match on 14 June 2018.

== Film career ==
Durani appeared in the films Ek Masoom (1969) and Charitra with Parveen Babi in 1973. He was the first cricketer to win an Arjuna Award. He was awarded the C. K. Nayudu Lifetime Achievement Award by the BCCI in 2011.

== Personal life ==
Durani's father Aziz Durani learned to play cricket in Karachi and was employed by Ranjitsinhji of Nawanagar to play for his team.

== Death ==
Salim Durani died from cancer on 2 April 2023, at the age of 88. He was living with his brother, Jahangir Durani, in Gujarat's Jamnagar and had undergone surgery for a thigh bone fracture earlier in the year.

It was observed on numerous occasions, that Salim Durrani would hit a six on the demand of the audience in the cricket field. People also called him a romantic.
