= Baloo Gupte =

Indian cricketer (1934–2005)

Personal information
- Full name: Balkrishna Pandharinath Gupte
- Born: 30 August 1934; Bombay, British India
- Died: 5 July 2005 (aged 70); Mumbai, India
- Batting: Right-handed
- Bowling: Legbreak googly
- Relatives: Subhash Gupte (brother)

International information
- National side: India
- Test debut (cap 100): 13 January 1961 v Pakistan
- Last Test: 5 March 1965 v New Zealand

Career statistics
Competition	Test	First-class
Matches	3	99
Runs scored	28	587
Batting average	28.00	9.17
100s/50s	0/0	0/0
Top score	17*	35
Balls bowled	678	10,379
Wickets	3	417
Bowling average	116.33	24.88
5 wickets in innings	0	26
10 wickets in match	0	5
Best bowling	1/54	9/55
Catches/stumpings	0/–	21/–
- Source: ESPNcricinfo, 3 June 2022

Balkrishna Pandharinath "Baloo" Gupte (30 August 1934 – 5 July 2005) was an Indian cricketer. He was a leg-spinner.

Gupte was born in Bombay in British India. He made his debut under Nari Contractor in 1960–61 against Pakistan led by Fazal Mahmood at the Corporation Stadium in Madras (now Chennai). He played three Tests for India between 1960–61 and 1964–65. His first class career spanned 1953–53 to 1967-68 playing for Bombay, Bengal and Railways. He died in Bombay on 5 July 2005, after a lengthy illness, aged 70.

He was the younger brother of Subhash Gupte, one of the finest spinners to play for India.

Preceded by Geff Noblet	Nelson Cricket Club; Professional; 1957–1958	Succeeded by Johnny Wardle
