= East Zone cricket team =

First-class cricket team

- Association: Board of Control for Cricket in India

History
- Duleep Trophy wins: 3
- Deodhar Trophy wins: 5
- Syed Mushtaq Ali Trophy wins: 1

The East Zone cricket team is a first-class cricket team that represents eastern India in the Duleep Trophy and Deodhar Trophy. It is a composite team of six first-class Indian teams from eastern India competing in the Ranji Trophy: Assam, Bihar, Bengal (West Bengal), Jharkhand, Odisha and Tripura. East Zone has won the Duleep Trophy three times in the 2011/12, 2012/13 and 2026/27 seasons, the Deodhar Trophy five times in the 1992/93, 1993/94, 1996/97, 2003/04 and 2014/15 seasons, as well as the Syed Mushtaq Ali Trophy once in the 2016/17 season.

== Current squad ==
Players with international caps are listed in bold. Updated as on 26 Jul 2023

Name	Domestic team	Birth date	Batting Style	Bowling Style	Format	Notes
Batters
Anustup Majumdar	Bengal	30 April 1984 (age 42)	Right-handed	Right arm leg break	First-class	
Sudip Gharami	Bengal	21 March 1999 (age 27)	Right-handed	Right arm off break	First-class & List A	
Shantanu Mishra	Odisha	30 May 1994 (age 32)	Right-handed	Right arm off break	First-class	
Abhimanyu Easwaran	Bengal	6 September 1995 (age 31)	Right-handed	Right arm leg break	First-class & List A	Vice-captain
**Saurabh Tiwary**	Jharkhand	30 December 1989 (age 36)	Left-handed	Right arm off break	List A	Captain
Virat Singh	Jharkhand	8 December 1997 (age 28)	Left-handed	Right arm off break	List A	
Subhranshu Senapati	Odisha	30 December 1996 (age 29)	Left-handed	Right arm medium-fast	List A	
Rishav Das	Assam	16 December 1989 (age 36)	Right-handed	Right arm off break	List A	
All-rounders
**Shahbaz Ahmed**	Bengal	11 December 1994 (age 31)	Left-handed	Slow left-arm orthodox	First-class & List A	
Riyan Parag	Assam	10 November 2001 (age 24)	Right-handed	Right arm leg break	First-class & List A	
Anukul Roy	Jharkhand	30 November 1998 (age 27)	Left-handed	Slow left-arm orthodox	First-class	
Utkarsh Singh	Jharkhand	7 May 1998 (age 28)	Left-handed	Right arm off break	List A	
Wicket-keepers
Abhishek Porel	Bengal	17 October 2002 (age 23)	Left-handed	-	First-class & List A	
Kumar Kushagra	Jharkhand	23 October 2004 (age 21)	Right-handed	-	First-class & List A	
Bipin Saurabh	Bihar	20 November 1999 (age 26)	Right-handed	-	First-class	
Spin Bowler
**Shahbaz Nadeem**	Jharkhand	12 August 1989 (age 37)	Right-handed	Slow left-arm orthodox	First-class	
Avinov Choudhury	Assam	1 December 1999 (age 26)	Right-handed	Slow left-arm orthodox	List A	
Pace Bowlers
Manisankar Murasingh	Tripura	1 January 1993 (age 33)	Left-handed	Right arm medium-fast	First-class & List A	
Ishan Porel	Bengal	5 September 1998 (age 28)	Right-handed	Right arm medium-fast	First-class	
Akash Deep	Bengal	15 December 1996 (age 29)	Right-handed	Right arm medium-fast	First-class & List A	
Suryakant Pradhan	Odisha	30 September 1993 (age 32)	Right-handed	Right arm medium-fast	First-class	
Mukhtar Hussain	Assam	11 January 1999 (age 27)	Right-handed	Right arm medium-fast	List A	
Abhijeet Saket	Bihar	3 August 1995 (age 31)	Right-handed	Right arm medium-fast	List A	

== Famous players from East Zone ==
- Pankaj Roy
- Sourav Ganguly
- Arun Lal
- Wriddhiman Saha
- Mahendra Singh Dhoni
- Deep Dasgupta
- Rohan Gavaskar
- Devang Gandhi
- Debasis Mohanty
- Shiv Sunder Das
- Saurabh Tiwary
- Manoj Tiwary
- Ashok Dinda
- Mohammed Shami
- Ishan Kishan
- Vaibhav Sooryavanshi
