= Central Zone cricket team =

First-class cricket team

- Association: Board of Control for Cricket in India

History
- Duleep Trophy wins: 7
- Deodhar Trophy wins: 4
- Syed Mushtaq Ali Trophy wins: 0

The Central Zone cricket team is a first-class cricket team that represents central India in the Duleep Trophy and Deodhar Trophy. It is a composite team of players from seven first-class Indian teams from central India competing in the Ranji Trophy: Chhattisgarh, Madhya Pradesh, Railways, Rajasthan, Uttar Pradesh, Uttarakhand and Vidarbha. Central Zone has the fourth strongest track record of all the zones in the Duleep Trophy, as they have won the Trophy 7 times, with the best team, North Zone having won 17 times.

== Current squad ==
Players with international caps are listed in bold. Updated as on 8 Aug 2025

| Name | Domestic team | Birth date | Batting Style | Bowling Style | Format | Notes |
Batters
| **Rajat Patidar** | Madhya Pradesh | 1 June 1993 (age 33) | Right-handed | Right arm off break | First-class | Vice-captain |
| Yash Rathod | Vidarbha | 16 May 2000 (age 26) | Left-handed | Right arm Offbreak | First-class | |
| Danish Malewar | Vidarbha | 8 October 2003 (age 22) | Right-handed | Legbreak | First-class | |
| Ayush Pandey | Chhattisgarh | 19 September 2003 (age 22) | Left-handed | Right-arm offbreak | First-class | |
| Sanjeet Desai | Chhattisgarh | 12 December 1997 (age 28) | Right-handed | Legbreak Googly | First-class | |
All-rounder
| Manav Suthar | Rajasthan | 3 August 2002 (age 24) | Left-handed | Slow left-arm orthodox | First-class | |
| Harsh Dubey | Vidarbha | 23 July 2002 (age 24) | Left-handed | Slow Left arm Orthodox | First-class | |
| Shubham Sharma | Madhya Pradesh | 24 December 1993 (age 32) | Right -handed | Right arm Offbreak | First-class | |
Wicket-keepers
| **Dhruv Jurel** | Uttar Pradesh | 21 January 2001 (age 25) | Right-handed | - | First-class | Captain |
| Aryan Juyal | Uttar Pradesh | 11 November 2001 (age 24) | Right-handed | - | First-class | |
Spin Bowlers
| Saransh Jain | Madhya Pradesh | 31 March 1993 (age 33) | Left-handed | Right-arm off break | First-class | |
| **Kuldeep Yadav** | Uttar Pradesh | 14 December 1994 (age 31) | Left-handed | Left arm Wrist Spin | First-class | |
Pace Bowlers
| **Khaleel Ahmed** | Rajasthan | 5 December 1997 (age 28) | Right-handed | Left arm Fast medium | First-class | |
| **Deepak Chahar** | Rajasthan | 7 August 1992 (age 34) | Right-handed | Right-arm medium | First-class | |
| Aditya Thakare | Vidarbha | 8 November 1998 (age 27) | Right-handed | Right arm medium | First-class | |

== Famous players from Central Zone ==
- Pravin Amre
- Murali Kartik
- Mohammad Kaif
- Amay Khurasiya
- Suresh Raina
- R. P. Singh
- Praveen Kumar
- Piyush Chawla
- Umesh Yadav
- Naman Ojha
- Bhuvneshwar Kumar
- Ishwar Pandey
- Pankaj Singh
