= 2024 Tamil Nadu Premier League =

Cricket tournament

- Dates: 5 July – 4 August 2024
- Administrator: Tamil Nadu Cricket Association
- Cricket format: Twenty20
- Tournament format(s): Round-robin and play-offs
- Champions: Dindigul Dragons (1st title)
- Runners-up: Kovai Kings
- Participants: 8
- Matches: 32
- Player of the series: Shahrukh Khan (Kovai Kings)
- Most runs: Shivam Singh (Dindigul Dragons) (364)
- Most wickets: M. Poiyamozhi (Salem Spartans) (16)

The 2024 Tamil Nadu Premier League (also known as TNPL-8 and branded as Shriram Capital TNPL) was the eighth season of the Tamil Nadu Premier League (TNPL). It took place from 5 July 2024 to 4 August 2024. Kovai Kings were the defending champions, having won the previous season. In the final, the Dindigul Dragons defeated the Lyca Kovai Kings by six wickets to win their first TNPL title.

== Background ==
The Tamil Nadu Premier League is a franchise Twenty20 cricket league held in India, organized by the Tamil Nadu Cricket Association. It is held annually since 2016. Kovai Kings were the defending champions, having won their second title in the previous season after beating Nellai Royal Kings in the final.

=== Format ===
The format remained the same since the 2017 season, wherein the eight teams played against each other in the league phase in round-robin format and the top four qualified for the playoffs. The playoffs consist of three matches – one eliminator and two qualifiers, followed by the final. The top two teams from the league phase play against each other in the first qualifier match with the winner progressing to the final. The loser would play against the winner of an eliminator match between the third and fourth-place teams from the league phase play in the second qualifier. The winner of this match would play the winner of the first qualifier for the title.

=== Schedule ===
The season was held from 5 July to 4 August 2024.

=== Prize money ===
The winners of TNPL are awarded ₹10 (10¢ US) with the runners-up receiving ₹6 million (US$62,000). The two semi-finalists are awarded ₹4 million (US$42,000) each with the remaining four teams receiving ₹2.5 million (US$26,000) each.

=== Sponsorship ===
Shriram Group continued to be the title sponsor of the event, having won the rights in 2020.

== Broadcasting ==
Star India has held the television rights since the inaugural season in 2016. The matches are telecast with commentaries in English and Tamil. FanCode is the streaming partner since the last season.

== Teams ==
Team locations

Eight franchises are competing in the league. The franchises are named after a city it is representing in the state. Each team can have a maximum of 20 players that includes two outstation players.

TNPL teams
Team	City	Captain	Coach	Owner
Chepauk Super Gillies	Chennai	Baba Aparajith	Hemang Badani	Metronation Chennai Television
Dindigul Dragons	Dindigul	Ravichandran Ashwin	Subramaniam Badrinath	Take Solutions
Kovai Kings	Coimbatore	Shahrukh Khan	Sriram Somayajula	Lyca Productions
Nellai Royal Kings	Tirunelveli	Arun Karthik	A. G. Guruswamy	Crown Forts
Salem Spartans	Salem	Shijit Chandran	B. Ramprakash	Selvakumar
Madurai Panthers	Madurai	Hari Nishaanth	Bharath Reddy	Seichem Technologies
Trichy Grand Cholas	Tiruchirapalli	Antony Dhas	Tinu Yohannan	Drumstick Productions
Tiruppur Tamizhans	Tiruppur	Sai Kishore	Ramaswamy Prasanna	iDream Cinemas and Properties

=== Personnel changes ===
For the season, the teams were permitted a maximum of 20 players and were allowed to retain a set of players before the rest went into an auction. About 61 players were sold in the auction with the maximum bid at ₹2.2 million (US$23,000).

Top buys at the auction
Player	Team	Price
Sai Kishore	Tiruppur Tamizhans	₹2.20 million (US$23,000)
Sanjay Yadav	Trichy Grand Cholas	₹2.20 million (US$23,000)
S Harish Kumar	Salem Spartans	₹1.54 million (US$16,000)
Abhishek Tanwar	Chepauk Super Gillies	₹1.22 million (US$13,000)
T Natarajan	Tiruppur Tamizhans	₹1.125 million (US$12,000)

== Venues ==
Match venues

The group stage matches were held in four venues across the state. The last two matches of the league including the final was held at M. A. Chidambaram Stadium in Chennai.

Stadium	City	Capacity
M. A. Chidambaram Stadium	Chennai	38,000
Salem Cricket Foundation Stadium	Salem	5,000 (expandable to 25,000)
SNR College Cricket Ground	Coimbatore	Limited (expandable)
NPR College Ground	Dindigul	5,000
Indian Cement Company Ground	Tirunelveli	4,000

== Points table ==
Pos	Team	Pld	W	L	NR	Pts	NRR
1	Kovai Kings	7	6	1	0	12	0.728
2	Tiruppur Tamizhans	7	4	3	0	8	0.677
3	Chepauk Super Gillies	7	4	3	0	8	0.362
4	Dindigul Dragons (C)	7	4	3	0	8	0.109
5	Nellai Royal Kings	7	3	3	1	7	0.039
6	Trichy Grand Cholas	7	3	4	0	6	0.012
7	Madurai Panthers	7	2	4	1	5	−1.152
8	Salem Spartans	7	1	6	0	2	−0.858

Source: ESPNcricinfo
- Advanced to the qualifiers
- Advanced to the eliminator

== Playoffs ==
Qualifier 1 / Eliminator
30 July 2024 - Dindigul
1	Kovai Kings	201/3 (18.5)
2	Tiruppur Tamizhans	200/3 (20)
31 July 2023 - Dindigul
3	Chepauk Super Gillies	158/6 (20)
4	Dindigul Dragons	161/6 (19.5)

Qualifier 2
2 August 2024 - Chennai
Q1L	Tiruppur Tamizhans	108 (19.4)
EW	Dindigul Dragons	112/1 (10.5)

Final
4 August 2024 - Chennai
Q1W	Kovai Kings	129/7 (20)
Q2W	Dindigul Dragons	131/4 (18.2)

=== Qualifier 1 ===
30 July 2024
19:15 (N)
Scorecard

Tiruppur Tamizhans; 200/3 (20 overs)	v	Kovai Kings; 201/3 (18.5 overs)
Amit Sathvik 67 (42); Jhathavedh Subramanyan 1/38 (4 overs)		Sai Sudharsan 123* (56); P. Bhuvaneswaran 1/36 (3.5 overs)

Lyca Kovai won by 7 wickets
NPR College Ground, Dindigul
Umpires: Subramanian Anand and Rakesh Raghavan
Player of the match: Sai Sudharsan (Lyca Kovai Kings)

- Tiruppur Tamizhans won the toss and elected to bat.

=== Eliminator ===
31 July 2024
19:15 (N)
Scorecard

Chepauk Super Gillies; 158/6 (20 overs)	v	Dindigul Dragons; 161/6 (19.5 overs)
Baba Aparajith 72 (54); Sandeep Warrier 2/35 (4 overs)		Shivam Singh 64 (49); J. Prem Kumar 2/26 (4 overs)

Dindigul Dragons won by 4 wickets
NPR College Ground, Dindigul
Umpires: Sadashiv Iyer and M Madhu
Player of the match: Ravichandran Ashwin (Dindigul Dragons)

- Dindigul Dragons won the toss and elected to field.

=== Qualifier 2 ===
2 August 2024
19:15 (N)
Scorecard

Tiruppur Tamizhans; 108 (19.4 overs)	v	Dindigul Dragons; 112/1 (10.5 overs)
Maan Bafna 26 (19); P. Vignesh 3/8 (4 overs)		Ravichandran Ashwin 69* (30); P. Bhuvaneswaran 1/22 (1.5 overs)

Dindigul Dragons won by 9 wickets
M. A. Chidambaram Stadium, Chennai
Umpires: Rajesh Kannan and Krishnaraj Srinath
Player of the match: P. Vignesh (Dindigul Dragons)

- Dindigul Dragons won the toss and elected to field.

=== Final ===
In the final, the Dindigul Dragons defeated the Kovai Kings by six wickets to win their first TNPL title.

4 August 2024
19:15 (N)
Scorecard

Kovai Kings; 129/7 (20 overs)	v	Dindigul Dragons; 131/4 (18.2 overs)
Ram Arvindh 27 (26); P. Vignesh 2/15 (4 overs)		Ravichandran Ashwin 52 (46); Manimaran Siddharth 1/14 (4 overs)

Dindigul Dragons won by 6 wickets
M. A. Chidambaram Stadium, Chennai
Umpires: Saidharshan Kumar and Jayaraman Madanagopal
Player of the match: Ravichandran Ashwin (Dindigul Dragons)

- Dindigul Dragons won the toss and elected to field.

== Statistics ==
=== Most runs ===
Runs	Player	Team	Inns.	HS	Ave	100s/50s
364	(India) Shivam Singh	Dindigul Dragons	9	106*	45.50	1/3
324	(India) Tushar Raheja	Tiruppur Tamizhans	9	81	36.00	−/3
286	(India) Baba Indrajith	Dindigul Dragons	10	96*	40.85	−/2
260	(India) Arun Karthik	Nellai Royal Kings	7	84	43.33	−/2
252	(India) Ravichandran Ashwin	Dindigul Dragons	9	69*	36.00	−/3
Source: ESPNcricinfo

=== Most wickets ===
Wkts.	Player	Team	Inns	BBI	Ave	4W
16	(India) M Poiyamozhi	Salem Spartans	7	4/28	13.68	1
13	(India) Shahrukh Khan	Kovai Kings	9	3/13	15.30	−
13	(India) Athisayaraj Davidson	Trichy Grand Cholas	7	4/32	15.46	1
12	(India) T Natarajan	Tiruppur Tamizhans	8	4/36	17.50	1
12	(India) Sandeep Warrier	Dindigul Dragons	10	2/17	19.25	−
Source: ESPNcricinfo
