= 2018 Tamil Nadu Premier League =

Tamil Nadu Premier League 2018
- Dates: 11 July 2018 – 12 August 2018
- Administrator: Tamil Nadu Cricket Association
- Cricket format: Twenty20
- Tournament format(s): Round Robin and Playoffs
- Host: tamilnadu
- Champions: Madurai Panthers ( 1st Title )
- Runners-up: Dindigul Dragons
- Participants: 8
- Matches: 32
- Most runs: 472 runs ( Arun Karthik ) Siechem Madurai Panthers
- Most wickets: 15 wickets ( AB Tanwar ) Siechem Madurai Panthers
- Official website: Tamil Nadu Premier League

The 2018 season of the Tamil Nadu Premier League is the third edition of the TNPL, a professional Twenty20 cricket league in Tamil Nadu, India. The league was formed by the Tamil Nadu Cricket Association (TNCA) in 2016.

== Teams ==
Team	City	Captain	Coach
Chepauk Super Gillies	Chennai	Vijay Shankar	Hemang Badani
Kovai Kings	Coimbatore	T Natarajan	Lance Klusener
Dindigul Dragons	Dindigul	Ravichandran Ashwin	M. Venkataramana
Trichy Warriors	Tiruchirapalli	Baba Indrajith	Tinu Yohannan and Brett Lee
Karaikudi Kaalai	Karaikudi	Subramaniam Badrinath	Robin Singh
Madurai Super Giants	Madurai	Abhishek Tanwar	Michael Bevan
Tuti Patriots	Thoothukudi	Washington Sundar	Monty Desai
VB Kanchi Veerans	Tiruvallur	Baba Aparajith	

Source: Cricbuzz

=== Squads ===
Chepauk Super Gillies	Kovai Kings	Dindigul Dragons	Madurai Super Giants	Karaikudi Kaalai	Trichy Warriors	VB Kanchi Veerans	Tuti Patriots
Vijay Shankar; Gopinath; Murugan Ashwin; S Harish Kumar; Ganga Sridhar Raju; Sunny Kumar Singh; Samruddh Bhat; Arun Kumar; R Vishaal; M Siddharth; MK Sivakumar; S Karthik; R Alexander; Uthirasamy Sasidev; Baskaran Rahul; A Aarif; Manav Parakh; Sai Sudharsan; B Arun	T. Natarajan; Abhinav Mukund; Shahrukh Khan; Akkil Srinaath; Ashwin Venkataraman; R Sathyanarayan; Antony Dhas; Krishnamoorthy Vignesh; M Raja; S Ajith Ram; Ravi Kumar Rohith; Suresh Babu; Pradosh Ranjan Paul; S Manigandan; R Mithun; Muhammed Khan; Prasanth Rajesh; Sumant Jain; J Suresh Kumar	Ravichandran Ashwin; NS Chaturved; C Hari Nishaanth; Balchander Anirudh; Adithya Arun; M Silambarasan; Trilok Nag; ME Yazh Arun Mozhi; Jagannathan Kaushik; Nivethan Radhakrishnan; M Mohammed; Ramalingam Rohit; N Jagadeesan; R Vivek; Ra Aravind; N Ramakrishnan; Varun Totadri; M Sujendran; Mohan Abhinav	Abhishek Tanwar; Rahil Shah; Thalaivan Sargunam; Jagatheesan Kousik; Jaganath Sinivas; Nilesh Subramanian; SP Nathan; Kiran Akash; Lokesh Raj; Vikram Jangid; Arun Karthik; R Karthikeyan; Shijit Chandran; PS Sivaramakrishnan; MS Promoth; Tushar Raheja; SS Karnavar; D Rohit; Varun Chakravarthy	S Ganesh; Dinesh Karthik; Srikkanth Anirudha; Yo Mahesh; R Kavin; L Suryaprakash; Velidi Lakshman; S Kishan Kumar; S Radhakrishnan; Maan Bafna; Ashwath Mukumthan; S Swaminathan; T Ajith Kumar; M Shajahan; V Aditya; R Rajkumar; S Mohan Prasath; P Murgesh; Rajhamany Srinivasan	Baba Indrajith; MS Sanjay; Sonu Yadav; Chandrasekar Ganapathy; Sathiamoorty Saravanan; Lakshminarayanan Vignesh; Lakshmi Narayanan; DT Chandrasekar; K Mani Bharathi; Murali Vijay; Bharath Shankar; S Aravind; Kannan Vignesh; Aswin Crist; V Aakash; Govinda Raajan; Selvam Suresh Kumar; Saravan Kumar; RS Thillak; Dakshinamoorthy Kumaran	K Vishal Vaidhya; Aushik Srinivas; V Subramania Siva; U Mukilesh; Sunil Sam; K Deeban Lingesh; S Siddharth; P Francis Rokins; RS Mokit Hariharan; Baba Aparajith; R Silambarasan; S Arun; Sanjay Yadav; Suresh Lokeshwar; S Ashwath; S Chandrashekar; R Divakar; C Shriram; U Vishal	Washington Sundar; Kaushik Gandhi; Ravisrinivasan Sai Kishore; Rajagopal Sathish; V. Athisayaraj Davidson; Akshay Srinivasan; Malolan Rangarajan; Umashankar Sushil; S Dinesh; S Abishiek; Nidish Rajagopal; Rajamani Jesuraj; A Venkatesh; Akash Sumra; Subramanian Anand; M Ganesh Moorthi; S Boopalan; Ashith Sanganakal; Shubham Mehta; Dakshinamoorthy Kumaran

== Fixtures and match summary ==
The schedule of the round robin matches is provided below in details.

== Tournament results ==
=== Points table ===
- advanced to the playoffs

Team	Played	Won	Lost	Tie	NR	Points	NRR
Dindigul Dragons	7	5	2	0	0	10	+0.992
Madurai Panthers	7	5	2	0	0	10	+0.124
Lyca Kovai Kings	7	4	3	0	0	8	+0.577
Karaikudi Kaalai	7	4	3	0	0	8	+0.505
Tuti Patriots	7	4	3	0	0	8	−0.432
Ruby Trichy Warriors	7	4	3	0	0	8	−0.011
VB Kanchi Veerans	7	1	6	0	0	2	−0.870
Chepauk Super Gillies	7	1	6	0	0	2	−1.621
