= Tamil Nadu Premier League =

Indian T20 cricket league

- Countries: India
- Administrator: Tamil Nadu Cricket Association
- Format: Twenty20
- First edition: 2016
- Latest edition: 2026
- Tournament format: Round-robin format (groups and playoffs)
- Number of teams: 8
- Current champion: Kovai Kings (3rd title)
- Most successful: Chepauk Super Gillies (4 titles)
- Most runs: N Jagadeesan (2763)
- Most wickets: R Sai Kishore (96)
- TV: Sony Sports Network; YouTube (online streaming)
- Website: tnpl.cricket
- 2026 Tamil Nadu Premier League

The Tamil Nadu Premier League (TNPL) is an annual men's Twenty20 cricket tournament held in the Indian state of Tamil Nadu. It is organised by the Tamil Nadu Cricket Association and contested by eight city-based franchise teams from the state. The inaugural season was held in 2016.

Kovai Kings are the defending champions, having won their third title in 2026. Chepauk Super Gillies are the most successful team with four titles. (Note: Chepauk Super Gillies shared the 2021 Tamil Nadu Premier League title with Kovai Kings after the final was washed out.)

== History ==
=== Background ===
In July 2015, the R. M. Lodha committee appointed by the Supreme Court, suspended the Chennai-based Indian Premier League franchise Chennai Super Kings for a period of two years due to the association of their owners with illegal betting. As a result of the ban, there was no major competitive T20 cricket played in the state. In April 2016, the Tamil Nadu Cricket Association (TNCA) introduced plans for a Twenty20 cricket league to be played in May 2016. The inaugural edition of the Tamil Nadu Premier League (TNPL) was aimed at filling the void left by the absence of major T20 matches in the state, and at providing a platform for local players.

=== Franchise rights ===
The TNPL was proposed as an eight-team event contested by city-based franchise teams. On 1 May 2016, the TNCA invited bidders for the franchise rights, with the base price set at ₹12.5 million (US$190,000). Seventeen bidders participated in the process, and the eight franchises were later unveiled by the TNCA. The franchise rights for the eight teams were sold for ₹335.1 million (US$4.99 million), with the highest bid at ₹52.1 million (US$780,000).

Franchise rights
Owner	City	Price
Thoothukudi Sports & Entertainments	Thoothukudi	₹52.1 million (US$780,000)
Metronation Chennai Television	Chennai	₹51.3 million (US$760,000)
Lyca Productions	Coimbatore	₹50.1 million (US$750,000)
Kothari (Madras) International	Madurai	₹40.01 million (US$600,000)
Ruby Builders	Kanchipuram	₹36.9 million (US$550,000)
VB Cricket Academy	Thiruvallur	₹34.8 million (US$520,000)
Take Solutions	Dindigul	₹34.2 million (US$510,000)
Chettinad Apparels	Karaikkudi	₹33.0 million (US$490,000)

=== Inauguration ===
In June 2016, the TNCA announced that the first season would consist of 27 matches to be played in August and September across Chennai, Tirunelveli, and Dindigul, with the player draft to be held in July. The player draft was held in Chennai on 30 July. On 16 August, the first edition of the league was inaugurated by MS Dhoni, and was played from 24 August to 18 September. The inaugural edition featured both international and domestic cricketers registered with the TNCA.

== Organisation ==
=== Tournament format ===
During the inaugural season, the eight teams played every other team once and the top four qualified for the semifinals. Since the second season, a new system has been used in which the eight teams play against each other in the league phase in a round-robin format and the top four qualify for the playoffs. The playoffs consist of three matches – one eliminator and two qualifiers, followed by the final. The top two teams from the league phase play against each other in the first qualifier match with the winner progressing to the final. The loser plays against the winner of an eliminator match between the third and fourth-place teams from the league phase in the second qualifier. The winner of this match competes with the winner of the first qualifier for the title.

=== Player acquisition and salaries ===
For the first season, each team was allowed a minimum of 17 players and a maximum of 19. There were 888 players classified into three price bands with the highest price fixed at ₹0.5 million (equivalent to ₹720,000 or US$7,500 in 2023). The team with the highest bid during the franchise auction had the first right, followed in order by the value of the bids, repeated until a franchise exhausted its purse or refused to choose a player. For the subsequent seasons, the franchises retained the players and a short player draft was conducted to fill the vacant positions. For the 2018 season, the teams were allowed to retain three players and a new player draft was held with similar rules as the first draft. For the 2019 season, the teams were allowed to retain players from the previous season and permitted a maximum of 22 players with at least two players from the districts represented by the franchise.

Ahead of the 2020 season, the franchises were allowed to retain three players from the previous season and a new player draft was held. The salary caps for the categories were also raised, with the maximum cap set at ₹0.6 million (equivalent to ₹710,000 or US$7,300 in 2023).

Player categories
Category	Description	Salary (2016)	Salary (2020)
A	Represented the Indian national cricket team	₹0.3 million (equivalent to ₹430,000 or US$4,500 in 2023) – ₹0.5 million (equivalent to ₹720,000 or US$7,500 in 2023)	₹0.6 million (equivalent to ₹710,000 or US$7,300 in 2023)
B1–B2	Played at least 20 TNPL matches or appeared in domestic first class matches (BCCI)	₹0.15 million (equivalent to ₹220,000 or US$2,200 in 2023) – ₹0.25 million (equivalent to ₹360,000 or US$3,700 in 2023)	₹0.2 million (equivalent to ₹240,000 or US$2,400 in 2023) – ₹0.3 million (equivalent to ₹350,000 or US$3,700 in 2023)
C	Others	₹0.5 million (equivalent to ₹720,000 or US$7,500 in 2023) – ₹1 million (equivalent to ₹1.4 million or US$15,000 in 2023)	

Until 2020, the Board of Control for Cricket in India prevented TNCA from including outstation players in the league. For the fifth season, a maximum of two outstation players who were not part of the Indian Premier League were permitted per team, and a separate draft for the outstation players was held after the conclusion of the 2020 IPL season.

Ahead of the 2023 season, the TNCA introduced a new player auction to replace the draft system. Each team was given a purse of ₹7 million (US$80,000). For the 2024 season, teams were permitted a maximum of 20 players and allowed to retain a set of players before the rest went into the auction. Sixty-one players were sold in the auction, with the maximum bid at ₹2.2 million (US$30,000).

Player categories (2024)
Category	Description
A	Represented the Indian national cricket team
B	Played at least 20 TNPL matches or appeared in domestic first class matches (BCCI)
C	Played at least 30 TNPL matches (not in categories A and B)
D	Others

== Finances ==
The franchises were sold to the highest bidders for a period of ten years and the TNCA earned ₹335.1 million (US$0 million) in franchise rights. TNPL followed a similar business model to that of the IPL. For the first five years, eighty percent of the central rights (broadcast fees and sponsorship) after excluding match staging fees, were shared amongst the eight franchises and the rest went to the TNCA. Of this, sixty-five percent was divided equally between the franchises and the rest was given to the franchises as per their standing in the league. However, the gate collections from the matches were not shared by the TNCA with the franchises. To attract sponsors, owners were advised to name their teams after the districts in the state.

In May 2019, five of the franchises wrote to the TNCA regarding the financial difficulties faced by the franchises. The franchises expressed concerns regarding the lack of participation of outstation players, quality of umpiring, unavailability of players who represent India and the hosting of matches in smaller venues, which affected the viewership for the league and the television rating points. The franchises reportedly suffered losses of up to ₹250 million (US$0 million) and suggested several changes including the inclusion of more outstation players and changes to the revenue-sharing model of the league. In response, the TNCA stated that it already shares 80 per cent of the telecast and sponsorship fees with the franchises and gained only a net of ₹50 million (US$710,000) from the TNPL after meeting all expenses. However, some of the franchises were unsatisfied with the response and demanded an audit of the TNPL accounts.

=== Sponsorship ===
From 2016 to 2019, India Cements owned the title rights of the league. A tender for new title rights sponsor was released in March 2020 and was awarded to the Shriram Group.

Sponsor	Period
India Cements	2016–2019
Shriram Group	2021–2023

=== Prize money ===
The winners of TNPL are awarded ₹10 million (US$100,000) with the runners-up receiving ₹6 million (US$62,000). The two semi-finalists are awarded ₹4 million (US$42,000) each with the remaining four teams receiving ₹2.5 million (US$26,000) each.

== Broadcasting ==
In 2016, Star India acquired the media rights for ₹71 million (US$0 million) for a minimum period of five years. The matches are telecast with commentaries in English and Tamil. Star also streamed the matches over its OTT platform, Disney+ Hotstar till 2021. For the 2022 season, the digital rights were sold to Viacom18 and FanCode became the streaming partner since the 2023 season.

Period	Television	Digital
2016–2021	Disney Star	
2022	Disney Star	Viacom18
2023–2025	Disney Star	FanCode
2026	Sony Sports Network	YouTube

== Teams ==
=== Current ===
Eight franchises are competing in the league. The franchises are named after a city they are representing in the state. Each team can have a maximum of 20 players, including two outstation players.

Team locations

Team	City	Captain	Coach	Owner
Chepauk Super Gillies	Chennai	Narayan Jagadeesan	Avinash A.	Metronation Chennai Television
Dindigul Dragons	Dindigul	Baba Indrajith	Ravichandran Ashwin	Take Solutions
Kovai Kings	Coimbatore	Shahrukh Khan	Thiru Kumaran	Anantha Karthikeyan
Nellai Royal Kings	Tirunelveli	Sonu Yadav	Varun	Crown Forts
Salem Spartans	Salem	S Abishiek	Ramaswamy Prasanna	Selvakumar
Madurai Panthers	Madurai	Balachander Anirudh	Arun Karthik	Palani Guruswamy
Trichy Grand Cholas	Tiruchirapalli	J Suresh Kumar	Tinu Yohannan	Drumstick Productions
Tiruppur Tamizhans	Tiruppur	Sai Kishore	Rx Muralidhar	iDream Cinemas and Properties

=== Defunct ===
Ahead of the 2017 season, Kanchi Warriors moved its base to Tiruchirappalli and changed its name to Trichy Warriors. Before the 2018 season, the Madurai franchise was sold to Seichem Technologies and was renamed as Madurai Panthers. Thiruvallur Veerans was renamed as Kanchi Veerans ahead of the same season. In 2019, the BCCI said that action was initiated against the owners of two of the franchises for match fixing. In response, the TNCA asked the franchise Tuti Patriots to remove two of their co-owners. Tuti Patriots became solely owned by Selvakumar, after two of the three owners moved out and the team was renamed as Salem Spartans. Ahead of the 2020 season, Karaikudi Kaalai was also renamed as Tiruppur Tamizhans, after moving to the city of Tiruppur. Kanchi Veerans franchise was also sold to Crown Forts and was known as Nellai Royal Kings after shifting its base to Tirunelveli. Ahead of the 2023 season, the Trichy Warriors franchise was bought by Drumstick productions and renamed to Ba11sy Trichy for a single season, before it was renamed again as Trichy Grand Cholas ahead of the 2024 season.

Team	City	Period
Kanchi Warriors	Kanchipuram	2016
Madurai Super Giants	Madurai	2016-2017
Thiruvallur Veerans	Tiruvallur	2016-2017
Tuti Patriots	Thoothukudi	2016–2019
Karaikudi Kaalai	Karaikudi	2016–2019
Kanchi Veerans	Kanchipuram	2018-2019
Trichy Warriors	Tiruchirappalli	2017-2022
Ba11sy Trichy	Tiruchirappalli	2023

=== Timeline ===
Present teams Former teams

== Venues ==
Match venues

Three venues were used for the first the first four seasons. League matches were hosted at Indian Cement Company Ground in Tirunelveli and NPR College Ground at Dindigul with the playoffs held at the M. A. Chidambaram Stadium at Chennai. From the 2020 season, matches were held at two new venues: Salem Cricket Foundation Stadium at Salem and SNR College Cricket Ground at Coimbatore.

Stadium	City	Capacity
M. A. Chidambaram Stadium	Chennai	38,000
Salem Cricket Foundation Stadium	Salem	5,000 (expandable to 25,000)
SNR College Cricket Ground	Coimbatore	Limited (expandable)
NPR College Ground	Dindigul	5,000
Indian Cement Company Ground	Tirunelveli	4,000

== Seasons and results ==
=== Summary ===
Season	Teams	Winner	Player of the series	Most runs	Most wickets
2016	8	Tuti Patriots	Narayan Jagadeesan (DD)	Narayan Jagadeesan (DD)	Anthony Das (CSG)
2017	8	Chepauk Super Gillies	Washington Sundar (TP)	Washington Sundar (TP)	Sai Kishore (CSG)
2018	8	Madurai Panthers	Arun Karthik (MP)	Arun Karthik (MP)	Abhishek Tanwar (MP)
2019	8	Chepauk Super Gillies	Ganeshan Periyaswamy (CSG)	Narayan Jagadeesan (DD)	Ganeshan Periyaswamy (CSG)
2021	8	Chepauk Super Gillies	Hari Nishaanth (DD)	Hari Nishaanth (DD)	Saravana Kumar (TW)
2022	8	Chepauk Super Gillies and Kovai Kings	Sanjay Yadav (NRK)	Sanjay Yadav (NRK)	Abhishek Tanwar (KK)
2023	8	Kovai Kings	Guruswamy Ajitesh (NRK)	Guruswamy Ajitesh (NRK)	Shahrukh Khan (KK)
2024	8	Dindigul Dragons	Shahrukh Khan (KK)	Shivam Singh (DD)	M. Poiyamozhi (SS)
2025	8	Tiruppur Tamizhans	Tushar Raheja (TT)	Tushar Raheja (TT)	Sonu Yadav (NRK)
2026	8	Kovai Kings	Balasubramaniam Sachin (KK)	Balasubramaniam Sachin (KK)	Deeban Lingesh (KK)

=== Finals ===
Season	Winner	Winning margin	Runner-up	Final venue	Player of the match
2016	Tuti Patriots; 215/2 (20 overs)	Patriots won by 122 runs Scorecard	Chepauk Super Gillies; 93 all out (18.5 overs)	M. A. Chidambaram Stadium, Chennai	Ganesh Moorthi (TP)
2017	Chepauk Super Gillies; 145/4 (19 overs)	Won by 6 wickets Scorecard	Tuti Patriots; 143/8 (20 overs)	M. A. Chidambaram Stadium, Chennai	Vasanth Saravanan (CSG)
2018	Madurai Panthers; 119/3 (17.1 overs)	Won by 7 wickets Scorecard	Dindigul Dragons; 117 all out (19.5 overs)	M. A. Chidambaram Stadium, Chennai	Arun Karthik (MP)
2019	Chepauk Super Gillies; 126/8 (20 overs)	Won by 12 runs Scorecard	Dindigul Dragons; 114/9 (20 overs)	M. A. Chidambaram Stadium, Chennai	Ganeshan Periyaswamy (CSG)
2021	Chepauk Super Gillies; 183/6 (20 overs)	Won by 8 runs Scorecard	Trichy Warriors; 175/7 (20 overs)	M. A. Chidambaram Stadium, Chennai	Narayan Jagadeesan (CSG)
2022	Chepauk Super Gillies and Kovai Kings; Joint winners	No result Scorecard	—N/a	SNR College Cricket Ground, Coimbatore	Sandeep Warrier (CSG)
2023	Kovai Kings; 205/5 (20 overs)	Won by 104 runs Scorecard	Nellai Royal Kings; 101 all out (15 overs)	Indian Cement Company Ground, Tirunelveli	Jhathavedh Subramanyan (KK)
2024	Dindigul Dragons; 131/4 (18.2 overs)	Won by 6 wickets Scorecard	Kovai Kings; 129/7 (20 overs)	M. A. Chidambaram Stadium, Chennai	Ravichandran Ashwin (DD)
2025	Tiruppur Tamizhans; 220/5 (20 overs)	Won by 118 runs Scorecard	Dindigul Dragons; 102 (14.4 overs)	NPR College Ground, Dindigul	Tushar Raheja (TT)
2026	Kovai Kings; 182/7 (20 overs)	Won by 84 runs Scorecard	Madurai Panthers; 98 (14.2 overs)	M. A. Chidambaram Stadium, Chennai	Andre Siddarth (KK)

=== Teams' performance ===
Season	2016	2017	2018	2019	2021	2022^{^}	2023	2024	2025	2026
Chepauk Super Gillies	RU	C	8th	C	C	C	5th	PO	PO	6th
Dindigul Dragons	SF	6th	RU	RU	PO	6th	PO	C	RU	7th
Tiruppur Tamizhans	5th	PO	PO	8th	8th	5th	6th	PO	C	PO
Kovai Kings	SF	PO	PO	5th	PO	C	C	RU	6th	C
Madurai Panthers^{†} / Madurai Super Giants	8th	8th	C	PO	6th	PO	PO	7th	8th	RU
Thiruvallur Veerans^{†} / Kanchi Veerans^{†} / Nellai Royal Kings	6th	5th	7th	PO	5th	PO	RU	5th	7th	5th
Kanchi Warriors^{†} / Trichy Warriors^{†} / Ba11sy Trichy^{†} / Trichy Grand Cholas	7th	7th	6th	7th	RU	7th	8th	6th	PO	PO
Tuti Patriots^{†} / Salem Spartans	C	RU	5th	6th	7th	8th	7th	8th	5th	8th

^{†} Team now defunct
^{^} Final was a no-result and trophy was shared

- C: champions
- RU: runner-up
- SF or PO: team qualified for the semi-final or playoff stage of the competition

== Records ==
=== Highest totals ===
Score	Team	Opponent	Date
240/4	Madurai Panthers	Kovai Kings	8 August 2026
240/2	Chepauk Super Gillies	Madurai Panthers	14 August 2026
239/6	Dindigul Dragons	Salem Spartans	14 August 2026
239/4	Kovai Kings	Madurai Panthers	8 August 2026
236/2	Nellai Royal Kings	Trichy Warriors	15 July 2022

Last updated:29 August 2026

=== Most runs ===
Runs	Batter	Seasons
2763	Narayan Jagadeesan	2016-2026
2447	Baba Aparajith	2016-2025
2315	Arun Karthik	2016-2025
1869	Hari Nishaanth	2016-2026
1836	M Shahrukh Khan	2016-2026

Last updated:29 August 2026

=== Highest individual scores ===
Runs	Batter	For	Against	Date
123*	Sai Sudharsan	Kovai Kings	Tiruppur Tamizhans	30 July 2024
121	Murali Vijay	Trichy Warriors	Nellai Royal Kings	15 July 2022
121	NS Chaturved	Madurai Panthers	Kovai Kings	8 August 2022
118*	Baba Aparajith	Kanchi Veerans	Karaikudi Kaalai	25 August 2016
116	Balasubramaniam Sachin	Kovai Kings	Salem Spartans	28 June 2025

Last updated:29 August 2026

=== Most wickets ===
Wickets	Bowler	Seasons
97	Sai Kishore	2016-2026
95	V. Athisayaraj Davidson	2016-2026
92	Abhishek Tanwar	2016-2026
85	Sonu Yadav	2016-2026
82	Rahil Shah	2016-2026

Last updated:15 August 2026

== See also ==
- List of regional T20 cricket leagues in India
