= 2017 Tamil Nadu Premier League =

Tamil Nadu Premier League 2017
- Dates: 22 July 2017 – 20 August 2017
- Cricket format: Twenty20
- Tournament format(s): Round Robin and Playoffs
- Champions: Chepauk Super Gillies (1st title)
- Runners-up: Tuti Patriots
- Participants: 8
- Matches: 32
- Player of the series: Washington Sundar
- Most runs: Washington Sundar (459)
- Most wickets: R Sai Kishore (17)

The 2017 season of the Tamil Nadu Premier League was the second edition of the TNPL, a professional Twenty20 cricket league in Tamil Nadu, India. The league was formed by the Tamil Nadu Cricket Association (TNCA) in 2016.

== Teams ==
Team	City	Captain	Coach
Chepauk Super Gillies	Chennai	Rajagopal Sathish	Hemang Badani
Kovai Kings	Coimbatore	Murali Vijay	Lance Klusener
Dindigul Dragons	Dindigul	Ravichandran Ashwin	M. Venkataramana
Trichy Warriors	Tiruchirapalli	Baba Indrajith	Tinu Yohannan and Brett Lee
Karaikudi Kaalai	Karaikudi	Subramaniam Badrinath	Robin Singh
Madurai Super Giants	Madurai	Arun Karthik	Michael Bevan
Tuti Patriots	Thoothukudi	Dinesh Karthik	Monty Desai
Thiruvallur Veerans	Tiruvallur	Baba Aparajith	Bharat Arun and Muttiah Muralitharan

== Tournament results ==
=== Points table ===
- advanced to the playoffs

Team	Played	Won	Lost	Tie	NR	Points	NRR
Tuti Patriots	7	7	0	0	0	14	+1.845
Chepauk Super Gillies	7	6	1	0	0	12	+0.501
Karaikudi Kaalai	7	4	3	0	0	8	+0.033
Lyca Kovai Kings	7	3	2	0	2	8	-0.086
Thiruvallur Veerans	7	3	4	0	0	6	+0.546
Dindigul Dragons	7	2	4	0	1	5	+0.347
Ruby Trichy Warriors	7	1	6	0	0	2	-1.181
Madurai Super Giants	7	0	6	0	1	1	-2.576

Source:Cricbuzz

=== Playoffs ===
Match	Venue	Winner	Winning margin	Loser	Player of the match
Qualifier-1	M. A. Chidambaram Stadium, Chennai	Tuti Patriots; 118/2 (12.3 overs)	Won by 8 wickets (Scorecard)	Chepauk Super Gillies; 114 all out (20 overs)	Washington Sundar
Eliminator	NPR College Ground, Dindigul	Kovai Kings; 194/6 (19 overs)	Won by 4 wickets (Scorecard)	Karaikudi Kaalai; 193/3 (20 overs)	Ravi Kumar Rohith
Qualifier-2	Indian Cement Company Ground, Tirunelveli	Chepauk Super Gillies; 90/1 (11 overs)	Won by 9 wickets (VJD method) (Scorecard)	Kovai Kings; 139/6 (20 overs)	S Karthik
Final	M. A. Chidambaram Stadium, Chennai	Chepauk Super Gillies; 145/4 (19 overs)	Won by 3 wickets (Scorecard)	Tuti Patriots; 143/8 (20 overs)	Vasanth Saravanan
