= 2019 Tamil Nadu Premier League =

Cricket sports season

- Dates: 19 July – 15 August 2019
- Administrator(s): Tamil Nadu Cricket Association (TNCA)
- Cricket format: Twenty20
- Tournament format(s): Round-robin and play-offs
- Host(s): Tamil Nadu
- Champions: Chepauk Super Gillies (2nd title)
- Runners-up: Dindigul Dragons
- Participants: 8
- Matches: 32
- Most runs: Narayan Jagadeesan (Dindigul Dragons) (448)
- Most wickets: Ganeshan Periyaswamy (Chepauk Super Gillies) (21)
- Official website: tnpl.tnca.cricket/results/

The 2019 season of the Tamil Nadu Premier League, was the fourth season of the TNPL, a professional Twenty20 cricket league established by the Tamil Nadu Cricket Association (TNCA) in 2016.

== Venues ==
Tamil Nadu
Chennai	Tirunelveli	Dindigul
M. A. Chidambaram Stadium	Indian Cement Company Ground	NPR College Ground
Capacity: 50,000	Capacity: 4,000	Capacity: 5,000

== Teams ==
Team	City	District	Captain	Coach	Owner
Tuti Patriots	Thoothukodi	Thoothukodi			Thoothukodi sports association
Chepauk Super Gillies	Chennai	Chennai	Kaushik Gandhi	Hemang Badani	Metronation Chennai Television Private Limited – Dailythanthi
Lyca Kovai Kings	Coimbatore	Coimbatore	Unnamed	Sriram Somayajula	Lyca Productions
Dindigul Dragons	Dindigul	Dindigul	Ravichandran Ashwin	M. Venkataramana	Take Solutions Ltd
Trichy Warriors	Tiruchirapalli	Tiruchirapalli	Sai Kishore	Tinu Yohannan	Ruby Builders
Karaikudi Kaalai	Karaikudi	Sivagangai			iDream Cinemas and iDream Properties
Siechem Madurai Panthers	Madurai	Madurai	Arun Karthik	Bharath Reddy	Pooja Damodaran
VB Kanchi Veerans	Kancheepuram	Kancheepuram			VB limit

== Points table ==
Team	Played	Won	Lost	Tie	Points	NRR
Dindigul Dragons	7	6	1	0	12	+0.694
Chepauk Super Gillies	7	5	2	0	10	+1.391
Siechem Madurai Panthers	7	5	2	0	10	+0.703
V. B. Kanchi Veerans	7	4	3	0	8	+0.552
Kovai Kings	7	4	3	0	8	+0.225
Tuti Patriots	7	2	5	0	4	-1.151
Ruby Trichy Warriors	7	1	6	0	2	-0.486
IDream Karaikudi Kaalai	7	1	6	0	2	-2.019

Source: TNCA

- Advance to the qualifiers
- Advance to the eliminator
- Eliminate from Tournament

=== Playoffs ===
Semifinals
11 August — Tirunelveli
1	Dindigul Dragons	164/7 (20 overs)
2	Chepauk Super Gillies	169/7 (20 overs)
11 August — Tirunelveli
3	Siechem Madurai Panthers	152/5 (20 overs)
4	V. B. Kanchi Veerans	151/6 (20 overs)

Preliminary final
13 August — Dindigul
1	Dindigul Dragons	175/6 (20 overs)
3	Siechem Madurai Panthers	130/10 (19.5 overs)

Final
15 August — Chennai
2	Chepauk Super Gillies	126/8 (20 overs)
1	Dindigul Dragons	114/9 (20 overs)
