= 2016 Tamil Nadu Premier League =

Tamil Nadu Premier League 2016
- Dates: July 22 – 20 August 2016
- Administrator(s): Tamil Nadu Cricket Association
- Cricket format: Twenty20
- Tournament format(s): Round Robin and Playoffs
- Champions: Tuti Patriots (1st title)
- Runners-up: Chepauk Super Gillies
- Participants: 8
- Matches: 31
- Player of the series: Narayan Jagadeesan
- Most runs: Narayan Jagadeesan (397)
- Most wickets: W Anthony Das (14)

The 2016 season of the Tamil Nadu Premier League was the inaugural edition of the TNPL, a professional Twenty20 cricket league in Tamil Nadu, India. The league was formed by the Tamil Nadu Cricket Association (TNCA) in 2016. Star India was the official broadcaster.

== Teams ==
Team	City	Captain	Coach
Chepauk Super Gillies	Chennai	Rajagopal Sathish	Hemang Badani
Kovai Kings	Coimbatore	Murali Vijay	Lance Klusener
Dindigul Dragons	Dindigul	Ravichandran Ashwin	M. Venkataramana
Trichy Warriors	Tiruchirapalli	Baba Indrajith	Brett Lee
Karaikudi Kaalai	Karaikudi	Subramaniam Badrinath	Robin Singh
Madurai Super Giants	Madurai	Arun Karthik	Michael Bevan
Tuti Patriots	Thoothukudi	Dinesh Karthik	Monty Desai
Thiruvallur Veerans	Tiruvallur	Baba Aparajith	Bharat Arun and Muttiah Muralitharan

== Tournament results ==
=== Points table ===
- advanced to the playoffs

Team	Played	Won	Lost	Tie	NR	Points	NRR
Chepauk Super Gillies	7	5	2	0	0	10	+0.964
Dindigul Dragons	7	5	2	0	0	10	+0.698
Tuti Patriots	7	4	3	0	0	8	+0.414
Kovai Kings	7	4	3	0	0	8	+0.384
Karaikudi Kaalai	7	4	3	0	0	8	+0.020
Thiruvallur Veerans	7	4	3	0	0	8	-0.104
Kanchi Warriors	7	2	5	0	0	4	-0.960
Madurai Super Giants	7	0	7	0	0	0	-1.411

Source:Cricbuzz

=== League progression ===
	Group matches							Knockout	
Team	1	2	3	4	5	6	7	SF	Final
Tuti Patriots	2	2	2	2	4	6	8	W	C
Chepauk Super Gillies	0	2	4	4	6	8	10	W	RU
Dindigul Dragons	2	4	6	8	8	10	10	L	
Kovai Kings	0	2	4	6	6	6	8	L	
Karaikudi Kaalai	0	0	2	4	6	6	8		
Thiruvallur Veerans	2	4	4	6	6	8	8		
Kanchi Warriors	2	2	2	2	4	4	4		
Madurai Super Giants	0	0	0	0	0	0	0		

Win	Loss	Super-Over	No result

- C - Champion
- RU - Runner-up

=== Fixtures ===
Date	Match	Team 1	Margin	Team 2	Ground	Time (IST)
24 Aug, Wed	1	**Tuti Patriots**	45 runs Scorecard	Chepauk Super Gillies	MA Chidambaram Stadium, Chennai	06:30 PM
25 Aug, Thurs	2	Karaikudi Kaalai	5 wickets Scorecard	**Tiruvallur Veerans**	NPR College Ground, Dindigul Dragons	06:30 PM
26 Aug, Fri	3	Kovai Kings	Super Over; Scorecard	**Kanchi Warriors**	MA Chidambaram Stadium, Chennai	06:30 PM
27 Aug, Sat	4	**Dindigul Dragons**	14 runs Scorecard	Madurai Super Giants	NPR College Ground, Dindigul	02:30 PM
28 Aug, Sun	5	**Chepauk Super Gillies**	67 runs Scorecard	Karaikudi Kaalai	NPR College Ground, Dindigul	02:30 PM
29 Aug, Mon	6	**Tiruvallur Veerans**	6 runs Scorecard	Madurai Super Giants	NPR College Ground, Dindigul	06:30 PM
30 Aug, Tues	7	**Dindigul Dragons**	48 runs Scorecard	Kanchi Warriors	MA Chidambaram Stadium, Chennai	06:30 PM
31 Aug, Wed	8	Tuti Patriots	9 wickets Scorecard	**Kovai Kings**	MA Chidambaram Stadium, Chennai	06:30 PM
1 Sep, Thu	9	**Dindigul Dragons**	29 runs Scorecard	Tiruvallur Veerans	India Cement Company Ground, Tirunelveli	06:30 PM
2 Sep, Fri	10	**Kovai Kings**	10 runs Scorecard	Madurai Super Giants	India Cement Company Ground, Tirunelveli	06:30 PM
3 Sep, Sat	11	**Karaikudi Kaalai**	8 runs Scorecard	Tuti Patriots	India Cement Company Ground, Tirunelveli	02:30 PM
3 Sep, Sat	12	Kanchi Warriors	7 wickets Scorecard	**Chepauk Super Gillies**	MA Chidambaram Stadium, Chennai	06:30 PM
4 Sep, Sun	13	Tuti Patriots	Super Over; Scorecard	**Dindigul Dragons**	India Cement Company Ground, Tirunelveli	06:30 PM
5 Sep, Mon	14	**Tiruvallur Veerans**	42 runs Scorecard	Kanchi Warriors	India Cement Company Ground, Tirunelveli	02:30 PM
5 Sep, Mon	15	**Kovai Kings**	11 runs Scorecard	Chepauk Super Gillies	India Cement Company Ground, Tirunelveli	06:30 PM
6 Sep, Tues	16	**Karaikudi Kaalai**	52 runs Scorecard	Madurai Super Giants	MA Chidambaram Stadium, Chennai	06:30 PM
7 Sep, Wed	17	Tiruvallur Veerans	6 wickets Scorecard	**Tuti Patriots**	NPR College Ground, Dindigul	06:30 PM
8 Sep, Thu	18	**Chepauk Super Gillies**	6 runs Scorecard	Dindigul Dragons	NPR College Ground, Dindigul	06:30 PM
9 Sep, Fri	19	Madurai Super Giants	& wickets Scorecard	**Kanchi Warriors**	NPR College Ground, Dindigul	02:30 PM
9 Sep, Fri	20	**Karaikudi Kaalai**	36 runs Scorecard	Kovai Kings	MA Chidambaram Stadium, Chennai	06:30 PM
10 Sep, Sat	21	**Chepauk Super Gillies**	55 runs Scorecard	Madurai Super Giants	NPR College Ground, Dindigul	02:30 PM
10 Sep, Sat	22	**Tiruvallur Veerans**	2 runs Scorecard	Kovai Kings	MA Chidambaram Stadium, Chennai	06:30 PM
11 Sep, Sun	23	Karaikudi Kaalai	7 wickets Scorecard	**Dindigul Dragons**	NPR College Ground, Dindigul	02:30 PM
11 Sep, Sun	24	Kanchi Warriors	9 wickets Scorecard	**Tuti Patriots**	MA Chidambaram Stadium, Chennai	06:30 PM
12 Sep, Mon	25	**Chepauk Super Gillies**	41 runs Scorecard	Tiruvallur Veerans	MA Chidambaram Stadium, Chennai	06:30 PM
13 Sep, Tues	26	**Kovai Kings**	16 runs Scorecard	Dindigul Dragons	India Cement Company Ground, Tirunelveli	02:30 PM
13 Sep, Tues	27	**Tuti Patriots**	33 runs Scorecard	Madurai Super Giants	MA Chidambaram Stadium, Chennai	06:30 PM
14 Sep, Wed	28	Kanchi Warriors	3 wickets Scorecard	**Karaikudi Kaalai**	India Cement Company Ground, Tirunelveli	06:30 PM

- Team 1 - 1st innings.
- **Winner** in bold.

=== Playoffs ===
Semi final
16 September 2016
6:30 P.M. (D/N)
Scorecard

**Tuti Patriots**; 187/8 (20 overs)	**v**	**Dindigul Dragons**; 149/8 (18.5 overs)
Abhinav Mukund 91 (55); Sunny Singh 3/34 (4 overs)		N Jagadeesan 59(41); Washington Sundar 4/23 (4 overs)

**Tuti Patriots won by 38 runs**
Indian Cement Company Ground, Tirunelveli
Umpires: Krishnaraj Srinath and Krishnamachari Srinivasan
Player of the match: Abhinav Mukund (Patriots)

- Patriots won the toss and elected to bat

Semi final
17 September 2016
6:30 P.M. (D/N)
Scorecard

**Chepauk Super Gillies**; 161/7 (20 overs)	**v**	**Kovai Kings**; 144/9 (18.5 overs)
Vasanth Saravanan 52(39); K Vignesh 2/21 (4 overs)		L Suryaprakash 38(28); Anthony Das 3/21 (4 overs)

**Chepauk Super Gillies won by 17 runs**
MA Chidambaram Stadium, Chennai
Umpires: Rajesh Kannan R and R Sundar
Player of the match: Vasanth Saravanan (Super Gillies)

- Super Gillies won the toss and elected to bat

Final
18 September 2016
6:30 P.M. (D/N)
Scorecard

**Tuti Patriots**; 215/2 (20 overs)	**v**	**Chepauk Super Gillies**; 93 (18.5 overs)
Abhinav Mukund 82*(52); Sai Kishore 1/35 (4 overs)		Vasanth Saravanan 30(34); Ganesh Moorthi 4/11 (4 overs)

**Tuti Patriots won by 122 runs**
MA Chidambaram Stadium, Chennai
Umpires: Krishnaraj Srinath and Krishnamachari Srinivasan
Player of the match: Ganesh Moorthi (Patriots)

- Patriots won the toss and elected to bat
