= South Zone cricket team =

Cricket team

- Association: Board of Control for Cricket in India

History
- Duleep Trophy wins: 13
- Deodhar Trophy wins: 9
- Syed Mushtaq Ali Trophy wins: 0

The South Zone cricket team is a first-class cricket team that represents southern India in the Duleep Trophy and Deodhar Trophy. It is a composite team of players from seven first-class Indian teams from southern India competing in the Ranji Trophy: Andhra Pradesh, Goa, Hyderabad, Karnataka, Kerala, Tamil Nadu and Pondicherry. South Zone has the third strongest track record of all the zones in the Duleep Trophy, as they have won the Trophy 12 times and also shared the winner's trophy twice, with the best team, West Zone having won 18 times plus shared the trophy two times more.

== Squad ==
Players with international caps are listed in bold.

Name	Birth date	Batting Style	Bowling Style	State Team	Format	Notes
Batsmen
**Mayank Agarwal**	16 February 1991 (age 35)	Right-handed	Right-arm off break	Karnataka	First-class & List A	Vice-captain
**Hanuma Vihari**	13 October 1993 (age 32)	Right-handed	Right-arm off break	Andhra	First-class	Captain
R Samarth	22 January 1993 (age 33)	Right-handed	Right-arm leg break	Karnataka	First-class	
**Tilak Varma**	8 November 2002 (age 23)	Left-handed	Right-arm off break	Hyderabad	First-class	
**Sai Sudharsan**	15 October 2001 (age 24)	Left-handed	Right-arm leg break	Tamil Nadu	First-class & List A	
Sachin Baby	18 December 1988 (age 37)	Left-handed	Right-arm off break	Kerala	First-class	
Pradosh Ranjan Paul	21 December 2000 (age 25)	Left-handed		Tamil Nadu	First-class	
Suyash Prabhudessai	6 December 1997 (age 28)	Right-handed	Right-arm medium	Goa	First-class	
**Devdutt Padikkal**	7 July 2000 (age 26)	Left-handed	Right-arm off break	Karnataka	List A	
Rohan Kunnummal	6 December 1997 (age 28)	Right-handed	Right-arm medium	Kerala	List A	
Rohit Rayudu	29 July 1994 (age 32)	Left-handed	Right-arm off break	Hyderabad	List A	
All-rounder
**Washington Sundar**	5 October 1999 (age 27)	Left-handed	Right-arm off break	Tamil Nadu	First-class & List A	
Wicket-keepers
Ricky Bhui	29 September 1996 (age 30)	Right-handed		Andhra	First-class & List A	
N Jagadeesan	24 December 1995 (age 30)	Right-handed		Tamil Nadu	First-class & List A	
Arun Karthik	15 February 1986 (age 40)	Right-handed		Pondicherry	List A	
Spin bowlers
**Sai Kishore**	6 November 1996 (age 29)	Left-handed	Slow left-arm orthodox	Tamil Nadu	First-class & List A	
Darshan Misal	11 September 1992 (age 34)	Left-handed	Slow left-arm orthodox	Goa	First-class	
Sijomon Joseph	28 September 1997 (age 29)	Left-handed	Slow left-arm orthodox	Kerala	List A	
Mohit Redkar	27 September 2000 (age 26)	Right-handed	Right-arm off break	Goa	List A	
Pace bowlers
V Vyshak	31 January 1997 (age 29)	Right-handed	Right-arm medium-fast	Karnataka	First-class & List A	
Vidwath Kaverappa	25 February 1999 (age 27)	Right-handed	Right-arm medium-fast	Karnataka	First-class & List A	
KV Sasikanth	17 July 1995 (age 31)	Right-handed	Right-arm medium-fast	Andhra	First-class	
V Koushik	19 September 1992 (age 34)	Right-handed	Right-arm medium-fast	Karnataka	First-class & List A	
Arjun Tendulkar	24 September 1999 (age 27)	Left-handed	Left-arm medium-fast	Goa	List A	

Updated as on 03 Aug 2023

== International players from South Zone ==
- Tinu Yohannan
- Roger Binny
- S. Venkataraghavan
- Syed Abid Ali
- Mansur Ali Khan Pataudi
- Syed Kirmani
- Brijesh Patel
- M. L. Jaisimha
- Abbas Ali Baig
- Mohammad Azharuddin
- Lakshmipathy Balaji
- Rahul Dravid
- Dinesh Karthik
- Anil Kumble
- V. V. S. Laxman
- Sreesanth
- Javagal Srinath
- Venkatesh Prasad
- Pragyan Ojha
- Bhagwat Chandrasekhar
- Erapalli Prasanna
- Kris Srikkanth
- Gundappa Viswanath
- Sunil Joshi
- Murali Vijay
- Vijay Bhardwaj
- Ravichandran Ashwin
- Robin Uthappa
- Karun Nair
- Manish Pandey
- Stuart Binny
- Vinay Kumar
- Abhinav Mukund
- Abhimanyu Mithun
- Sreenath Aravind
- Vijay Shankar (cricketer)
- KL Rahul
- Mayank Agarwal
- Hanuma Vihari
- Mohammad Siraj
- Sanju Samson
- Washington Sundar
- T. Natarajan
- Devdutt Padikkal
- Sai Kishore
- Sai Sudharshan
