= Suganesh Mahendran =

Indian cricketer (born 1990)

Personal information
- Born: 17 February 1990 (age 36); Kancheepuram, Tamil Nadu
- Batting: Right-handed
- Bowling: Right-arm medium-fast
- Role: All-rounder

Domestic team information
- Years: Team
- 2020–present: Salem Spartans

Suganesh Mahendran (born 17 February 1990) is an Indian cricketer. He played as vice-captain 2019 Physical disability world series and won the series. He lost his left hand in a motorbike accident.
