= West Indian cricket team in India in 2021–22 =

International cricket tour

	India	West Indies
- Dates: 6 – 20 February 2022
Captains	Rohit Sharma	Kieron Pollard (Note: Nicholas Pooran captained the West Indies for the second and third ODIs.)

One Day International series
- Results: India won the 3-match series 3–0
Most runs	Suryakumar Yadav (104)	Jason Holder (65)
Most wickets	Prasidh Krishna (9)	Alzarri Joseph (6)
- Player of the series: Prasidh Krishna (Ind)

Twenty20 International series
- Results: India won the 3-match series 3–0
Most runs	Suryakumar Yadav (107)	Nicholas Pooran (184)
Most wickets	Harshal Patel (5)	Roston Chase (6)
- Player of the series: Suryakumar Yadav (Ind)

The West Indian cricket team toured India in February 2022 to play three One Day International (ODI) and three Twenty20 International (T20I) matches. The ODI series formed part of the inaugural 2020–2023 ICC Cricket World Cup Super League. In September 2021, the Board of Control for Cricket in India (BCCI) confirmed the schedule for the tour.

In January 2022, to reduce the impact of the COVID-19 affecting the series, the BCCI limited the number of venues to be used, with Ahmedabad and Kolkata hosting the ODI and T20I matches respectively. The date of the third ODI was also moved forward by one day to avoid clashing with the 2022 IPL auction.

The opening fixture of the tour was India's 1,000th ODI match, becoming the first team to play one thousand matches in that format. India went on to win the match by six wickets. India won the second ODI by 44 runs, giving them an unassailable lead in the series. It was India's eleventh consecutive bilateral ODI series victory against the West Indies, a streak going back to January 2007. India won the third ODI by 96 runs to win the series 3–0.

India won the opening T20I match by six wickets. They went on to win the second T20I by eight runs, winning the series with a match to play. The win was also India's 100th victory in Twenty20 International cricket. India won the final match of the tour by 17 runs, to also win the T20I series 3–0.

== Squads ==
ODIs		T20Is	
India	West Indies	India	West Indies
Rohit Sharma (c); KL Rahul (vc); Mayank Agarwal; Ravi Bishnoi; Yuzvendra Chahal; Deepak Chahar; Shikhar Dhawan; Ruturaj Gaikwad; Deepak Hooda; Shreyas Iyer; Avesh Khan; Shahrukh Khan; Ishan Kishan; Virat Kohli; Prasidh Krishna; Rishabh Pant (wk); Mohammed Siraj; Washington Sundar; Shardul Thakur; Kuldeep Yadav; Suryakumar Yadav	Kieron Pollard (c); Fabian Allen; Nkrumah Bonner; Darren Bravo; Shamarh Brooks; Jason Holder; Shai Hope; Akeal Hosein; Alzarri Joseph; Brandon King; Nicholas Pooran; Kemar Roach; Romario Shepherd; Odean Smith; Hayden Walsh Jr.	Rohit Sharma (c); Rishabh Pant (vc, wk); ~~KL Rahul (vc)~~; Ravi Bishnoi; Yuzvendra Chahal; Deepak Chahar; Ruturaj Gaikwad; Deepak Hooda; Shreyas Iyer; Venkatesh Iyer; Avesh Khan; Ishan Kishan; Virat Kohli; Bhuvneshwar Kumar; ~~Axar Patel~~; Harshal Patel; Mohammed Siraj; ~~Washington Sundar~~; Shardul Thakur; Kuldeep Yadav; Suryakumar Yadav	Kieron Pollard (c); Nicholas Pooran (vc); Fabian Allen; Darren Bravo; Roston Chase; Sheldon Cottrell; Dominic Drakes; Jason Holder; Shai Hope; Akeal Hosein; Brandon King; Rovman Powell; Romario Shepherd; Odean Smith; Kyle Mayers; Hayden Walsh Jr.

Ahead of the tour, Shahrukh Khan and Ravisrinivasan Sai Kishore were both added to India's T20I squad as standby players. Following seven positive cases of COVID-19 in the Indian camp, Mayank Agarwal was added to India's ODI squad. Ishan Kishan, who was originally only part of India's T20I squad, was also added to their ODI squad, along with Shahrukh Khan. Ahead of the T20I series, KL Rahul and Axar Patel were both ruled out of India's team due to injuries. Ruturaj Gaikwad and Deepak Hooda were named as their replacements. Washington Sundar was also ruled out of India's T20I squad, after suffering a hamstring injury, with Kuldeep Yadav named as his replacement. Prior to the third and final T20I of the tour, Virat Kohli and Rishabh Pant were both released from the Indian squad.

== ODI series ==
=== 1st ODI ===
6 February 2022
13:30 (D/N)
Scorecard

West Indies; 176 (43.5 overs)	v	India; 178/4 (28 overs)
Jason Holder 57 (71); Yuzvendra Chahal 4/49 (9.5 overs)		Rohit Sharma 60 (51); Alzarri Joseph 2/45 (7 overs)

India won by 6 wickets
Narendra Modi Stadium, Ahmedabad
Umpires: K. N. Ananthapadmanabhan (Ind) and Nitin Menon (Ind)
Player of the match: Yuzvendra Chahal (Ind)

- India won the toss and elected to field.
- This was India's 1000th ODI, becoming the first team to achieve this.
- Deepak Hooda (Ind) made his ODI debut.
- Yuzvendra Chahal (Ind) took his 100th wicket in ODIs.
- Jason Holder (WI) scored his 2,000th run in ODIs.
- Virat Kohli (Ind) scored his 5,000th run in India in ODIs.
- World Cup Super League points: India 10, West Indies 0.

=== 2nd ODI ===
9 February 2022
13:30 (D/N)
Scorecard

India; 237/9 (50 overs)	v	West Indies; 193 (46 overs)
Suryakumar Yadav 64 (83); Odean Smith 2/29 (7 overs)		Shamarh Brooks 44 (64); Prasidh Krishna 4/12 (9 overs)

India won by 44 runs
Narendra Modi Stadium, Ahmedabad
Umpires: Nitin Menon (Ind) and Virender Sharma (Ind)
Player of the match: Prasidh Krishna (Ind)

- West Indies won the toss and elected to field.
- World Cup Super League points: India 10, West Indies 0.

=== 3rd ODI ===
11 February 2022
13:30 (D/N)
Scorecard

India; 265 (50 overs)	v	West Indies; 169 (37.1 overs)
Shreyas Iyer 80 (111); Jason Holder 4/34 (8 overs)		Odean Smith 36 (18); Prasidh Krishna 3/27 (8.1 overs)

India won by 96 runs
Narendra Modi Stadium, Ahmedabad
Umpires: Anil Chaudhary (Ind) and Nitin Menon (Ind)
Player of the match: Shreyas Iyer (Ind)

- India won the toss and elected to bat.
- World Cup Super League points: India 10, West Indies 0.

== T20I series ==
=== 1st T20I ===
16 February 2022
19:00 (N)
Scorecard

West Indies; 157/7 (20 overs)	v	India; 162/4 (18.5 overs)
Nicholas Pooran 61 (43); Ravi Bishnoi 2/17 (4 overs)		Rohit Sharma 40 (19); Roston Chase 2/14 (4 overs)

India won by 6 wickets
Eden Gardens, Kolkata
Umpires: K. N. Ananthapadmanabhan (Ind) and Jayaraman Madanagopal (Ind)
Player of the match: Ravi Bishnoi (Ind)

- India won the toss and elected to field.
- Ravi Bishnoi (Ind) made his T20I debut.

=== 2nd T20I ===
18 February 2022
19:00 (N)
Scorecard

India; 186/5 (20 overs)	v	West Indies; 178/3 (20 overs)
Rishabh Pant 52* (28); Roston Chase 3/25 (4 overs)		Rovman Powell 68* (36); Bhuvneshwar Kumar 1/29 (4 overs)

India won by 8 runs
Eden Gardens, Kolkata
Umpires: Nitin Menon (Ind) and Virender Sharma (Ind)
Player of the match: Rishabh Pant (Ind)

- West Indies won the toss and elected to field.
- Kieron Pollard became the first cricketer for the West Indies to play in 100 T20Is.
- 100th win in T20i for INDIA.

=== 3rd T20I ===
20 February 2022
19:00 (N)
Scorecard

India; 184/5 (20 overs)	v	West Indies; 167/9 (20 overs)
Suryakumar Yadav 65 (31); Roston Chase 1/23 (4 overs)		Nicholas Pooran 61 (47); Harshal Patel 3/22 (4 overs)

India won by 17 runs
Eden Gardens, Kolkata
Umpires: K. N. Ananthapadmanabhan (Ind) and Jayaraman Madanagopal (Ind)
Player of the match: Suryakumar Yadav (Ind)

- West Indies won the toss and elected to field.
- Avesh Khan (Ind) made his T20I debut.
- Kieron Pollard (WI) and Shardul Thakur (Ind) played their last T20I
