= Kaushik Gandhi =

Indian cricketer (born 1990)

Personal information
- Full name: Kaushik Mohan Gandhi
- Born: 23 February 1990 (age 36); Dindigul, Tamil Nadu, India
- Nickname: Piyush
- Batting: Right-handed
- Bowling: Right-arm off break
- Role: Batter, Umpire

Domestic team information
- Years: Team
- 2011–2022: Tamil Nadu

Umpiring information
- WT20Is umpired: 2 (2024)
- FC umpired: 4 (2025)
- LA umpired: 9 (2024–2025)
- T20 umpired: 18 (2024–2025)

Career statistics
Competition	First-class	List A
Matches	34	22
Runs scored	1,697	718
Batting average	36.10	35.90
100s/50s	4/7	3/0
Top score	202	127
Balls bowled	396	1
Wickets	1	0
Bowling average	191.00	–
5 wickets in innings	0	–
10 wickets in match	0	–
Best bowling	1/33	–
Catches/stumpings	20/–	11/–
- Source: ESPNcricinfo, 29 October 2016

Kaushik Gandhi (born 23 February 1990) is a former Indian first-class cricketer, who is currently an umpire. He made his List A debut for Tamil Nadu in the 2016–17 Vijay Hazare Trophy on 25 February 2017. He scored 124 off 134 balls against India B of a good bowling line up of Dhawal Kulkarni and Axar Patel. He made his first-class debut against Haryana in the 2010–11 Ranji Trophy.

== Career ==
He scored a century of 164 against Punjab in 2016. In that year Tamil Nadu qualified for quarter final by the help of unbeaten century of 150 by Gandhi against Gujarat. He was the top run getter in the 2016 Tamil Nadu Premier League for the Tuti Patriots and second highest run getter for Tamil Nadu in the 2016–17 Ranji Trophy. He also highest run getter in the 2016–17 Vijay Hazare Trophy for the Tamil Nadu. He scored his careers best score (202) in first-class cricket against Gujarat. In 2023, he played TNPL for Salem Spartans.

== Umpiring career ==
After the retirement from professional cricket he worked as umpire. He stood in several matches as an on-field umpire in the 2024–25 Syed Mushtaq Ali Trophy, 2024–25 Vijay Hazare Trophy and 2025–26 Duleep Trophy. He also officiated in WT20I match between India and West Indies on 15 December 2024. He also stood in the 2025 Indian Premier League.
