= Jhathavedh Subramanyan =

Hong Kong cricketer (born 1999)

Personal information
- Born: 16 September 1999 (age 27); Hong Kong
- Batting: Right-handed
- Bowling: Right-arm legbreak
- Source: Cricinfo, 8 April 2018

Jhathavedh Subramanyan (born 16 September 1999) is a Hong Kong cricketer. He made his first-class debut on 7 April 2018 for Durham MCCU against Middlesex as part of the Marylebone Cricket Club University fixtures.

Prior to his first-class debut, Subramanyan captained the Hong Kong U-19s in the Under-19 Cricket World Cup qualifiers and took five wickets against Oman in October 2016. In September 2017, he was named in Hong Kong's squad for fixtures in the 2015–17 ICC World Cricket League Championship and the 2015–17 ICC Intercontinental Cup.

In August 2018, he was named in Hong Kong's squad for the 2018 Asia Cup Qualifier tournament. However, he was ruled of the tournament due to injury. In April 2019, he was named in Hong Kong's squad for the 2019 ICC World Cricket League Division Two tournament in Namibia. He made his List A debut for Hong Kong against Canada in the 2019 ICC World Cricket League Division Two tournament on 20 April 2019.

In 2023, Subramanyan soon was picked up by the cricket team Lyca Kovai Kings in the first ever TNPL (Tamil Nadu Premier League) auction upon recommendation from the team's captain Shahrukh Khan, and took 11 wickets in 9 matches. Due to his stellar performance, he was subsequently picked up by the team Sunrisers Hyderabad in the 2024 IPL (Indian Premier League) auction.
