= Jaganath Sinivas =

Indian cricketer (born 1998)

Personal information
- Full name: RS Jaganath Sinivas
- Born: 27 October 1998 (age 28)
- Source: ESPNcricinfo, 12 February 2020

Jaganath Sinivas (born 27 October 1998) is an Indian cricketer. He made his first-class debut on 12 February 2020, for Tamil Nadu in the 2019–20 Ranji Trophy.
