= Tushar Raheja =

Storyteller, queueing theory researcher, novelist, short film maker

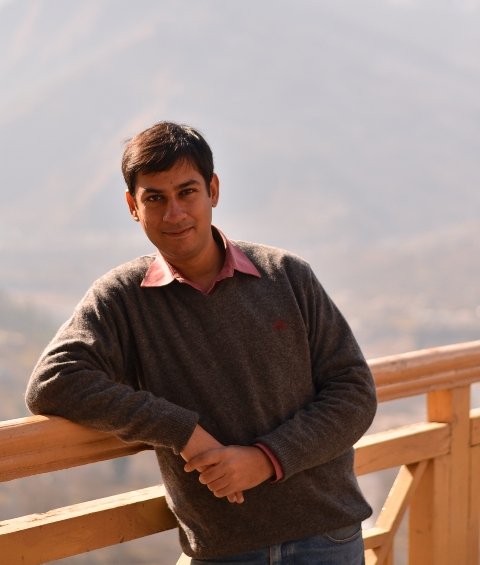
Tushar Raheja, the young Indian novelist.

Tushar Raheja (born 1984) is an Indian storyteller and mathematics researcher based in Cambridge, UK. His first book Anything for you, Ma'am, a comedy, was published in 2006 while he was an undergraduate student in Indian Institute of Technology Delhi. His first feature film The Bizarre Murder of Mr Tusker, a sci-fi, noir, starring BAFTA nominee Victor Banerjee, is due for release. His writing has been compared to that of P. G. Wodehouse by The Hindu and The Times of India and his books have been on the national best-selling charts. Raheja avoided formulaic books and instead devoted himself to mathematical research and the study of narration. Romi and Gang (published July 2013 by Pirates), previously titled Run Romi Run is only his second book in the market. The book about the unalloyed dreams of the young in the Indian hinterland revolves around cricket. It has been praised by The Hindu, Hindustan Times, The Daily Telegraph among other publications. Raheja is one of the few authors in India to combine widespread popularity with critical acclaim. In 2015, he obtained his PhD from IIT Delhi in the field of applied probability.

== Personal life ==
Raheja was born and brought up at Faridabad. His parents are doctors, his father a graduate of Armed Forces Medical College, Pune (AFMC). Raheja did his schooling from Apeejay School and DPS Faridabad. He obtained his B.Tech in industrial engineering from IIT Delhi in 2006. Anything for you, Ma'am, his first novel was also published in the same year. He followed it up with research in applied mathematics and completed Masters of Science in Operations research in 2010. In 2015, Raheja was awarded a PhD by IIT Delhi in the field of applied probability. Kiran Seth of SPIC MACAY and Sandeep Juneja were his thesis advisors.

== Books ==
=== Anything for you, Ma'am ===
Anything for you, Ma'am shot to national fame after its review in The Hindu headlined Outsourcing Wodehouse. The Times of India compared the plot to a classic Jeeves Wooster saga. The main protagonist Tejas has a propensity to land himself into comical troubles like Wooster and has an array of Jeeveses around him in the form of his friends and family. The book was especially praised for 'cleverly localising the Wooster persona. So English aristocracy, the idle rich, the lad sent down from Oxford, the young man with great expectations and little ability, the chappie whose only survival tool is a smart gentleman's gentleman called Jeeves – all this is turned into rich material for humour of a local kind.' There has been criticism of the book's ending which is compared to a Bollywood movie.

=== Romi and Gang ===
Romi and Gang, while it has been likened to Enid Blyton's stories for its innocence and the sense of nostalgia it evokes, and has been considered by Hindustan Times to be 'the equivalent of watching Lagaan', it is closer in spirit to Swami and Friends. It is the story of the boy ubiquitous in maidans all over the Indian hinterland who dreams of being the next Sachin Tendulkar

Romi and Gang is praised as unique for its use of cricket as a subject matter. Readers say Romi and Gang also features a noticeable shift in writing style compared to Raheja's first book, though Raheja does not intend to stick to any particular genre, and is currently working on a science fiction book. Romi and Gang is also unique for the inclusion of 25 full page pen and ink illustrations by Biswajit Das, which were included to lend the book an old-world charm.

== Films ==
Raheja has moved on from writing books to directing films. The international rights of his first feature film, The Bizarre Murder of Mr Tusker, were acquired at Berlinale by an American sales agency.

== See also ==
- List of Indian writers
