= Ravichandran Ashwin =

Indian cricketer (born 1986)

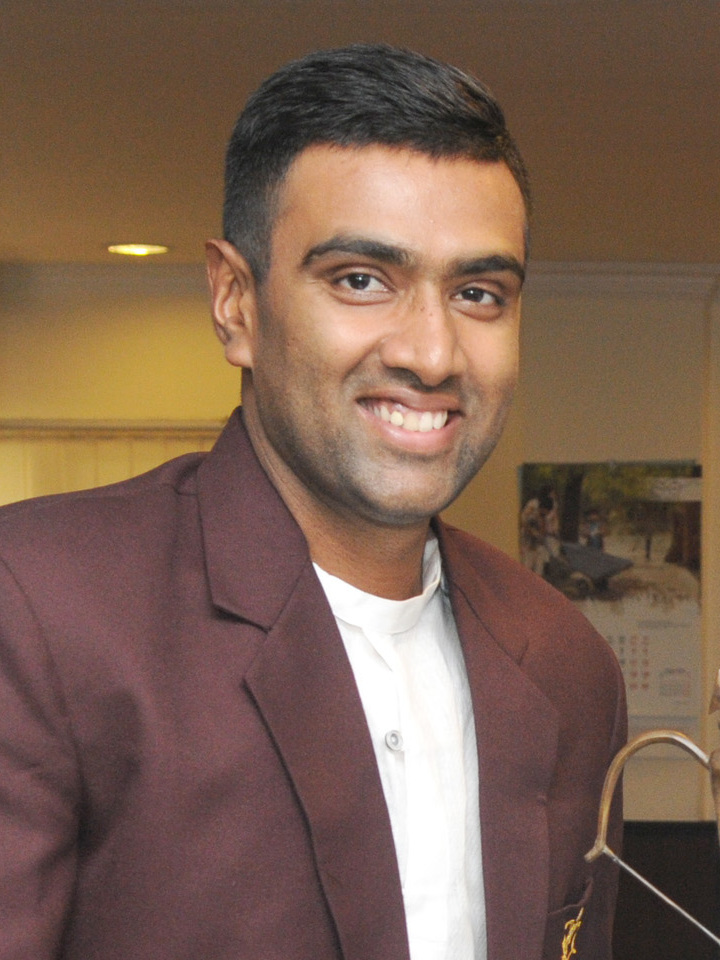
- Ashwin in 2015

Personal information
- Born: 17 September 1986 (age 40); Madras, Tamil Nadu, India
- Nickname: Ash; Lege
- Height: 188 cm (6 ft 2 in)
- Batting: Right-handed
- Bowling: Right-arm off-break
- Role: Bowling all-rounder
- Website: raviashwin.com

International information
- National side: India (2010–2024)
- Test debut (cap 271): 6 November 2011 v West Indies
- Last Test: 6 December 2024 v Australia
- ODI debut (cap 185): 5 June 2010 v Sri Lanka
- Last ODI: 8 October 2023 v Australia
- ODI shirt no.: 99
- T20I debut (cap 30): 12 June 2010 v Zimbabwe
- Last T20I: 10 November 2022 v England
- T20I shirt no.: 99

Domestic team information
- Years: Team
- 2006/07–2019/20: Tamil Nadu
- 2008–2015, 2025: Chennai Super Kings
- 2016: Rising Pune Supergiant
- 2016/17–present: Dindigul Dragons
- 2017: Worcestershire
- 2018–2019: Kings XI Punjab
- 2019: Nottinghamshire
- 2020–2021: Delhi Capitals
- 2021: Surrey
- 2022–2024: Rajasthan Royals
- 2026: San Francisco Unicorns
- 2026: Dublin Guardians

Career statistics
| Competition | Test | ODI | T20I | FC |
|---|---|---|---|---|
| Matches | 106 | 116 | 65 | 162 |
| Runs scored | 3,503 | 707 | 184 | 5,415 |
| Batting average | 25.92 | 16.44 | 26.28 | 27.62 |
| 100s/50s | 6/14 | 0/1 | 0/0 | 8/25 |
| Top score | 124 | 65 | 31* | 124 |
| Balls bowled | 27,138 | 6,141 | 1,452 | 41,782 |
| Wickets | 537 | 156 | 72 | 779 |
| Bowling average | 23.95 | 33.20 | 23.22 | 24.96 |
| 5 wickets in innings | 37 | 0 | 0 | 56 |
| 10 wickets in match | 8 | 0 | 0 | 12 |
| Best bowling | 7/59 | 4/25 | 4/8 | 7/59 |
| Catches/stumpings | 36/– | 30/– | 11/– | 61/– |
Medal record
Men's cricket
Representing India
ICC World Test Championship
| Runner-up | 2019–2021 |
| Runner-up | 2021–2023 |
ICC Cricket World Cup
| Winner | 2011 India, Bangladesh, Sri Lanka |
| Runner-up | 2023 India |
ICC T20 World Cup
| Runner-up | 2014 Bangladesh |
ICC Champions Trophy
| Winner | 2013 England & Wales |
| Runner-up | 2017 England & Wales |
ACC Asia Cup
| Winner | 2010 Sri Lanka |
| Winner | 2016 Bangladesh |
- Source: Cricinfo, 27 August 2026

YouTube information
- Channel: Ashwin
- Genres: Vlog; Podcast
- Subscribers: 1.9 million
- Views: 477.39 million
- Last updated: 27 August 2026

Ravichandran Ashwin (Tamil: [ɾaʋitɕand̪iɾan aɕʋin];) (born 17 September 1986) is an Indian cricketer. He is a right-arm off spin bowler and a lower order batter. Widely regarded as one of the most prolific spinners of all time, he represented the Indian cricket team and was part of the Indian team that won the 2011 Cricket World Cup and the 2013 Champions Trophy. He represented Tamil Nadu and South Zone in domestic cricket.

Ashwin has taken more than 500 wickets in Tests and was the fastest bowler to reach 300 test wickets in terms of number of innings. He has won eleven Man of the Series awards in Tests, which is the most for any cricketer, along with Muttiah Muralitharan. As an all-rounder in Test cricket, he bats down the order, has scored six Test centuries and is one of only three players to have scored 3000 runs and taken 500 wickets in Tests. He had been the highest-ranked bowler in the ICC men's player rankings multiple times, and holds the record for the second highest rating points by an Indian bowler ever in Test cricket.

Ashwin started as an opening batsman but dropped down the order due to limited success and turned into an off-break bowler. He made his first-class debut for Tamil Nadu in December 2006 and captained the team the following season. He played for the Chennai Super Kings (CSK) in the 2010 Indian Premier League, where his economical bowling led to his maiden international call-up in the limited-overs formats in June 2010. He was the leading wicket-taker and player of the tournament of the 2010 Champions League Twenty20, which was won by CSK. He also won the 2014 Champions League Twenty20 and two IPL titles (2010, 2011) with CSK.

In 2011, Ashwin made his Test debut against West Indies and became the seventh Indian bowler to take a five-wicket haul on debut. He had greater success with the turning tracks in the Indian subcontinent, including taking 29 wickets in a series against Australia, the most by any Indian bowler in a four-match Test series. In the 2015–16 season, he took 48 wickets and scored 336 runs in eight Test matches, along with 27 wickets in 19 T20Is, enabling him to win the ICC Cricketer of the Year and ICC Men's Test Cricketer of the Year awards for 2016. He has been named five times to the ICC Men's Test Team of the Year and was named in the ICC Men's Test Team of the Decade 2011–20. In 2015, he was awarded the Arjuna award by the Government of India. On 18 December 2024, Ashwin announced his retirement from all forms of international cricket. He was awarded the Padma Shri, the fourth highest civilian award, by the Government of India in January 2025.

== Early and personal life ==
Ashwin was born on 17 September 1986 in Madras (now Chennai), Tamil Nadu, to Ravichandran and Chitra. His father, Ravichandran, played cricket at club level as a fast bowler. Ashwin did his initial schooling at Padma Seshadri Bala Bhavan. Later, he switched to St. Bede's School for higher secondary. He graduated with a BTech in Information Technology from SSN College of Engineering, Chennai.

Ashwin started playing cricket at the age of nine for YMCA and was coached by Chandrasekar Rao during the early part of his career. Later, when he switched to St. Bede's, which had a cricket academy where he was coached by C K Vijaya Kumar. Initially, he took up medium pace bowling before he switched to off spin on the advice of his coach. He was later coached by former spinner Sunil Subramaniam and mentored by former cricketer W V Raman. He had represented the Indian under-17 team as an opening batter.

Ashwin resides in West Mambalam, Chennai. He married his childhood friend, Prithi Narayanan, on 13 November 2011. They have two daughters.

== International career ==
=== 2010–11: Debut and early years ===
On the back of his performance in the 2010 Indian Premier League, Ashwin was selected for the Indian squad that toured Zimbabwe for a tri-series in May 2010. He made his ODI debut against Sri Lanka on 5 June 2010, scoring a 32–ball 38 and taking 2/50 in that match, which India lost. His T20I debut came a week later, against Zimbabwe at Harare where he took 1/22 in four overs in an Indian win.

Ashwin was part of the squad for the 2010 Asia Cup, which India won. He was also part of the tri-series against New Zealand and Sri Lanka, but did not get a game, with Pragyan Ojha and Ravindra Jadeja being preferred. In October 2010, Ashwin was selected to play in the three-match home ODI series against Australia, in which he took 1/34 in nine overs in an Indian victory in the only match he played. Ashwin played in all five matches of the home series against New Zealand in November–December 2010 in which India completed a 5–0 whitewash with Ashwin ending up as the leading wicket-taker with 11 wickets at an average of 21.90. At the conclusion of the series, then Indian captain Gautam Gambhir called him "the find" of the series and hailed his bowling during the powerplay overs. Despite being in the squad, Ashwin did not make it to the playing eleven in any of the five ODIs on the South African tour in 2010, with Harbhajan Singh preferred.

Ashwin was part of the 15-member 2011 Cricket World Cup squad, with Harbhajan and Piyush Chawla being the other two specialist spinners in the squad. Ashwin played only two matches in World cup, which India won, defeating Sri Lanka in the finals. Ashwin played the fourth and fifth matches of India's tour of West Indies in June–July 2011, picking up just one wicket. Ashwin was retained in the limited-overs squad for the England tour and emerged as India's best bowler of the series, taking six wickets at an average of 25.16. When England toured India in October 2011, Ashwin was the second-highest wicket-taker of the series, with ten wickets in a 5–0 victory.

=== 2011–12: Test debut and rise ===
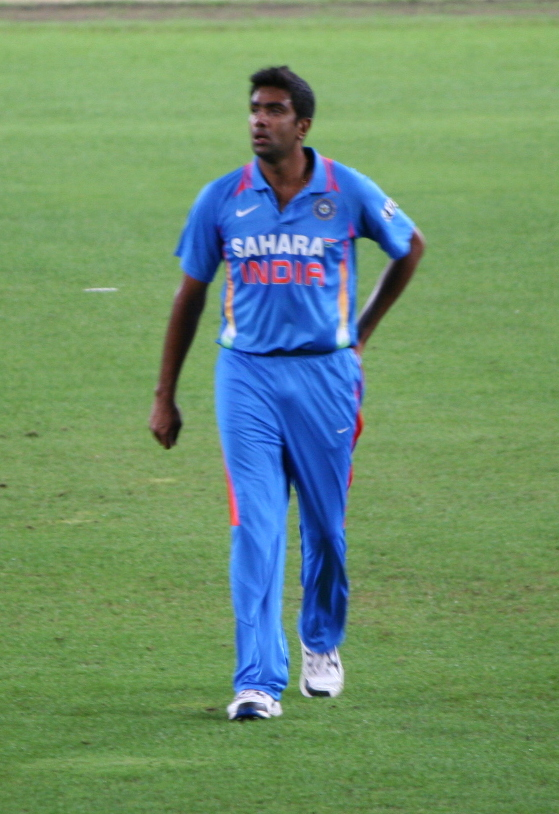
Ashwin in a T20 match against Australia in 2012

In November 2011, West Indies toured India for three Tests and five ODIs, with Ashwin and Ojha being the only two specialist spinners in the squad. Ashwin made his Test debut in the first match at Delhi, earning his cap from Sachin Tendulkar. He took 3/81 in the first innings and picked a fifer with 6/47 in the second, helping India win the match and was awarded the man of the match, becoming the third Indian player to win the award on Test debut. He picked four wickets in the second Test at Kolkata, where India registered an innings victory. In the third Test at Mumbai, he took 5/156 and scored his maiden international century in India's first innings, thus becoming only the third Indian to score a century and take a five-wicket haul in the same Test and the first since 1962. The match ended in a draw with the scores level, and was awarded the man of the match as well as the man of the series for his all-round performance. Ashwin also featured in four matches of the subsequent ODI series and took four wickets at an average of 49.00.

Ashwin was part of the squad that toured Australia in 2011-12. He played in three Tests on the tour, taking just nine wickets at an average of more than 62. He also featured in the subsequent triangular CB Series against Australia and Sri Lanka and took seven wickets in as many matches at 43.42. In March 2012, he took five wickets in three matches of the 2012 Asia Cup in Bangladesh. He had a quiet tour of Sri Lanka in July–August 2012, taking five wickets at 39.40 in the five-match ODI series and 1/22 in the one-off T20I.

=== 2012–15: Middle years and consolidation ===
Ashwin returned to form during the two-match home Test series against New Zealand. In the first Test at Hyderabad, he claimed 6/31 and 6/54, helping India seal an innings victory and was named the man of the match with his match figures of 12/85, bettering S. Venkataraghavan's 12/152 for the best figures by an Indian bowler against New Zealand in Tests. In the second match at Bangalore, his efforts of 5/69 in the second innings helped India win the match and the series 2–0. He was awarded man of the series for his tally of 18 wickets at an average of 13.11. Ashwin played four matches in the 2012 ICC World Twenty20 in Sri Lanka and took five wickets at an economy rate of 6 and an average of 19.

During the first Test of England's tour of India in late 2012, Ashwin became the fastest Indian to record 50 wickets in Test cricket as he overhauled the milestone in his ninth game. India eventually lost the series 2–1 in which Ashwin managed to take only 14 wickets in the four Tests at an average of 52.64. However, he scored 243 runs, averaging 60.75, including two fifties, and finished as India's second best batsman of the series. In the three-match ODI series against Pakistan and the five-match ODI series against England, he took three wickets at 43.33 and seven wickets at 35.71, respectively.

There were a few changes I had to make after the England series [...] I had to work on my delivery stride, it had got a little long during the England series and that was affecting the way I was delivering the ball. We had very little time, but I was lucky to have a coach [Subramaniam] who identified it pretty quickly.

— Ashwin on the changes he made to his bowling before the Australia series

In February 2013, Ashwin worked with Sunil Subramaniam to make changes to his bowling ahead of the four-match Test series against Australia, including shortening of his bowling stride. Ashwin had a successful series in the Australia's four-Test tour of India in February–March 2013. In the first Test at Chennai, his home ground, he took 7/103 and 5/95, leading India to a comfortable eight-wicket victory. He had a haul of 5/63 in the second innings of the second Test at Hyderabad, where India registered an innings win and took four wickets in the third Test at Mohali, where India sealed the series with a six-wicket victory. In the last match at Delhi, he took 5/57 and 2/55 in another Indian win which completed a 4–0 whitewash of Australia. During the match, Ashwin surpassed Anil Kumble's record of 27 wickets for the most wickets by an Indian bowler in a four-Test series. Ashwin finished the series as the leading wicket-taker with a tally of 29 wickets at 20.10 and won the Man of the Series award. It was the first time India won four or more Tests in a series and the first time Australia was whitewashed since 1969–70.

Ashwin was part of the Indian team that won the 2013 ICC Champions Trophy in England. His match figures of 2/15 in four overs in the 20-overs-a-side final helped India restrict England to 124/8 and win the match by five runs. He had a total of eight wickets from five matches at an average of 22.62, conceding 4.41 runs per over, and ended as the joint-fifth highest wicket-taker of the tournament and was named in the 'Team of the Tournament'. With nine wickets in six matches, Ashwin finished as the leading wicket-taker of the home ODI series against Australia in October–November 2013, which India won 3–2.

On India's tour of South Africa, Ashwin had a difficult time with the ball, picking up only one wicket across three ODIs and went wicketless in his 42 overs in the first Test at Johannesburg, following which, he was dropped for the second Test. In early 2014, Ashwin's overseas struggles continued during the New Zealand tour, where he managed to bag a solitary wicket in the five-match ODI series, which India lost 4–0. However, in the third ODI, coming in to bat with India at 146/5 in pursuit of 315, he scored his maiden ODI fifty of 65 runs from 46 balls. He shared a 38-run partnership with Dhoni and an 85-run seventh wicket stands with Jadeja, as the match eventually ended in a tie. In the two-match Test series that followed, Jadeja was preferred over Ashwin as the lone spinner in the playing eleven.

Ashwin was back among the wickets when India went to Bangladesh for the 2014 Asia Cup and the 2014 ICC World Twenty20. He took nine wickets in four matches of the Asia Cup and finished as the joint-third highest wicket-taker of the tournament. He played a vital role in India's unbeaten run to the World Twenty20 final. His tally of 11 wickets in six matches at an average of 11.27 and an economy rate of 5.35 put him joint third on the list of most wickets in the tournament. He was named in the "Team of the Tournament" for the 2014 T20 World Cup by the ICC and ESPNcricinfo.

Ashwin was part of the Indian team that toured England in 2014. He played only two matches in the five Test series, scoring 40 and 46 not out but going wicketless in the fourth Test and taking three wickets in the last match, both of which ended in defeats. India won the ODI series that followed 3–1. with Ashwin taking seven wickets from four matches at an average of 24.85 and an economy rate of less than 4.5. India whitewashed Sri Lanka in a five-match ODI series in November 2014, in which Ashwin took 6 wickets to his name at 33.33. Ashwin was not part of the first Test of India's tour of Australia in December 2014. He returned to the playing eleven in the second test and took a total of 12 wickets at an average of 48.66 in the remaining three matches.

=== 2015–19: Consistency and rise to stardom ===
I see a lot of myself in Ashwin. He is a fantastic cricketer with a lot of work ethic. Obviously, he is a far better batsman than me.

— Former India Test captain Anil Kumble on Ashwin, February 2015

Ashwin was selected to represent India for the second consecutive ODI World cup held in Australia and New Zealand in 2015. He took 13 wickets in 8 matches in India's run to the semi-finals and was named on the bench in the 'Team of the tournament'. In the 2015 three-match series against Sri Lanka, he finished with 21 wickets and, in the process, broke the record for the most wickets by an Indian bowler in a series against Sri Lanka, winning the Man of the Series award. These efforts led him to achieve the top ranking in ICC men's rankings for bowlers in tests for the year 2015.

In November 2015, Ashwin was a star performer throughout the Freedom Trophy Test series against South Africa in India. During the course of the series, he became the fastest Indian to reach 150 wickets in Test cricket. In the third Test in Nagpur, he picked up 12 wickets for 98 runs to hand South Africa their first away series loss in nine years, with his career-best figures of 7/66 in the second innings bowling the visitors out for 185 to give India a 2–0 series win. He was named in the ICC Men's Test Team of the Year in 2015.

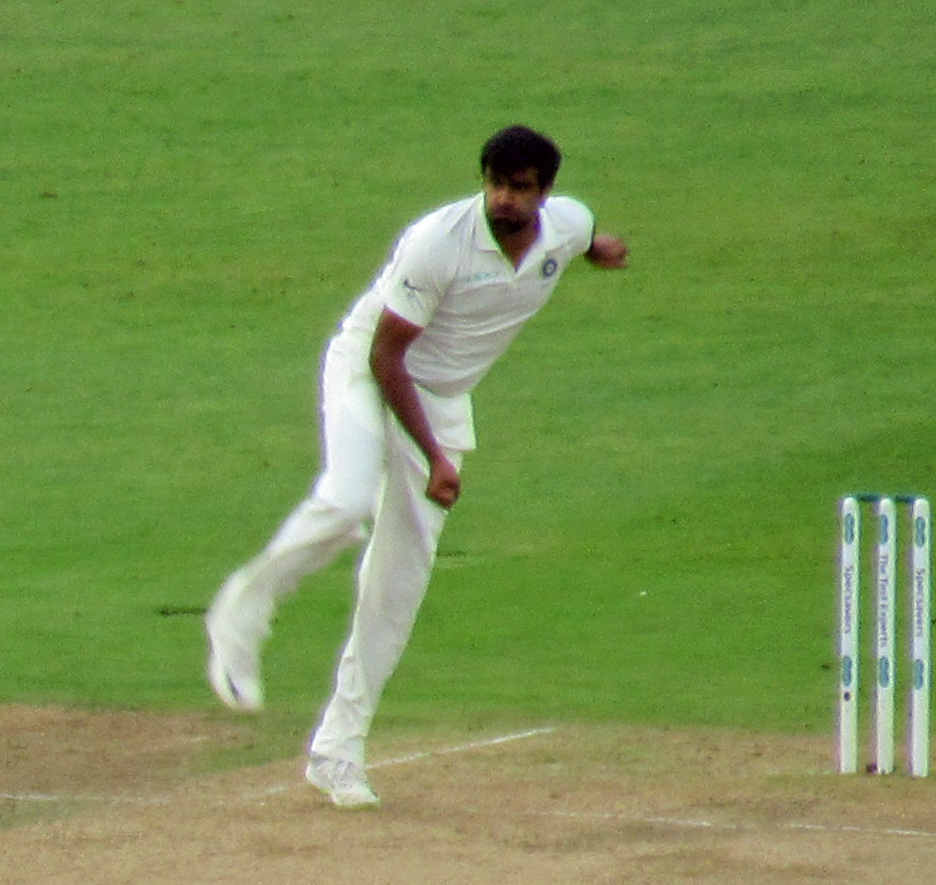
Ashwin bowling in a Test match in Trent Bridge in 2018

Ashwin was part of the Indian squad that won the 2016 Asia Cup, in which he took four wickets in as many matches. He had a brilliant series during the 2016 tour to West Indies where he scored 235 runs with two centuries and took 17 wickets in four tests, with India winning the series 2–0. In New Zealand's tour of India in 2016, Ashwin took 27 wickets in three Tests, including a career-best of 7 for 59 in an innings. Ashwin followed it up with an all round performance, taking 28 wickets and scoring 306 runs in the five match test series against England, which India won 4–0. Overall, Ashwin had a brilliant home season in 2016, taking 82 wickets and thus breaking the record for the most wickets taken in a single domestic season. He also became the second Indian to score 500 runs and take 50 wickets in a single season. For his performances in 2016, he was named in the ICC Men's Test Team of the Year. In December 2016, the International Cricket Council named Ashwin the "ICC Cricketer of the Year" and the "ICC Test Cricketer of the Year" for 2016. In the process, he became the third Indian to win the Sir Garfield Sobers Trophy for the "ICC Cricketer of the Year" after Rahul Dravid and Sachin Tendulkar, and also the second cricketer ever after Dravid to win the two awards in the same year.

In February 2017, Ashwin took 21 wickets in the four-match series against Australia, which India won 2–1. Ashwin was part of the limited overs squad that toured West Indies in June 2017 after which he became a player who played exclusively in tests. In the Indian tour of Sri Lanka in August 2017, Ashwin was the leading wicket-taker with 17 wickets, leading India to a 3–0 victory. Ashwin was again the leading wicket-taker with 12 wickets in Sri Lanka's return tour in December 2017, which India won 1–0. In 2017, he was named in the Test team of the year for the third consecutive year by the ICC. In 2018, India played most of the test matches away from home, with the team touring South Africa and England. Ashwin played six tests, taking 18 wickets, while India lost both the series. In the first test against England on 1 August 2018 at Birmingham, Ashwin took seven wickets in the match including figures of 4/62 in the first innings, which is his best bowling performance in England. Ashwin took nine wickets in the 2–0 victory over West Indies in India in October 2018.

=== 2019–24: Final years ===
In the 2019–20 home season, India played South Africa and Bangladesh, winning all three series. Ashwin was a key performer in the wins, taking 20 wickets across five matches. Ashwin played one match in the Indian tour of New Zealand, which was won by New Zealand. In the following series in the Indian tour of Australia, India won a historic 2–1 victory, with Ashwin taking 12 wickets across three matches. In December 2020, he was named in the ICC Men's Test Team of the Decade for 2011-20 and was announced as one of the nominees for the ICC Male Cricketer of the Decade.

During England's tour of India in 2021, which India won 3–1, Ashwin took 32 wickets and scored 189 runs, including a century, in four tests. During the series, he became the fastest Indian bowler to reach the landmark of 400 Test wickets and the fourth Indian, after Kapil Dev, Anil Kumble and Harbhajan Singh, to achieve the milestone. Ashwin was the lead wicket-taker with four wickets in the 2021 ICC World Test Championship final loss to New Zealand in June 2021.

In September 2021, Ashwin earned a surprise recall to the Indian squad for the 2021 ICC Men's T20 World Cup, more than four years since he played a T20 international. He made the comeback in white-ball cricket in India's third match of the tournament against Afghanistan and bowled a good spell taking two wickets for 14 runs in four overs. Ashwin continued to play T20 international matches across 2021 and 2022. He was also named in the Indian squad, which reached the semi-finals of the 2022 ICC Men's T20 World Cup, playing all six matches and taking six wickets.

In the 2021–22 season, India won the home series against New Zealand and Sri Lanka where Ashwin ended up as the leading wicket taker in both series. His consistent performances in test cricket enabled him to be named in the ICC Test team of the year for 2021. In January 2022, India toured South Africa where Ashwin took only three wickets in as many matches as India lost 1–2. Ashwin was once again the leading wicket taker in the West Indies with 15 wickets in a 1–0 victory. In the Australian tour to India in March 2023, Ashwin took 25 wickets in four matches to lead India to a series victory. On the back of the victory against Australia, India qualified for the second consecutive ICC World Test Championship final. Ashwin was not part of the playing eleven in the final, which India lost to Australia.

Ashwin earned a surprise recall to the ODI team for the series against Australia prior to the 2023 Cricket World Cup, in which he took four wickets from two matches. He was subsequently named as a part of the Indian squad for the World Cup. In the World Cup, where India finished runners-up, he played his lone match against Australia and had the best economy rate of 3.4. On 16 February 2024, during the third test of the England tour of India, Ashwin took his 500th test wicket, becoming the second Indian and ninth overall to achieve the feat. In the fifth and final test match of the same series, Ashwin played his 100th Test match and finished as the leading wicket taker of the series with 26 wickets.

During the Indian home season in 2023–24, Ashwin scored a century and took six wickets in the first test of the series against Bangladesh in Chennai. This was the fourth time he did a double of scoring a century and taking more than five wickets in a test match, and became the first cricketer to achieve the feat twice at the same venue. He took his 37th five wicket haul in the second innings, the second most in test cricket and became the oldest Indian cricketer to take a five wicket haul. He finished the series as the joint highest wicket taker and won a record equaling eleventh Man of the Series award.

Ashwin played his last test match during India's tour of Australia in December 2024. He announced his retirement from international cricket on 18 December 2024.

== Domestic career ==
Ashwin represented Tamil Nadu in domestic cricket. Ashwin made his first class debut for Tamil Nadu in the Ranji trophy match against Haryana in 2006 at the age of 20, taking six wickets. He made his List A debut in 2007 against Andhra, taking two wickets. His T20 debut came in a victory against Andhra in the interstate T20 tournament next month. He has represented the team in multiple seasons in the Ranji Trophy. Ashwin captained the Tamil Nadu team that won the Vijay Hazare Trophy in 2008-09 and reached the semi-finals in 2015. He was part of the team that reached the final of the tournament in 2019.

Ashwin has also played for South zone team. He captained the India A team in the Deodhar Trophy in 2018.

=== County career ===
In August 2017, Ashwin made his English county debut with Worcestershire against Gloucestershire, taking three wickets. He again returned to play for Worcestershire for the 2018 season. In 2019, Nottinghamshire signed Ashwin for the second half of the 2019 County Championship season. Ashwin made his debut against Essex at Trent Bridge and made significant contributions for the county, claiming 34 wickets and 339 runs in five matches.

== Franchise career ==
=== Indian Premier League ===
Representing Chennai Super Kings

Indian Premier League
| Winner | 2010, 2011 | |

Champions League
| Winner | 2011, 2014 | |

Ashwin was signed as a domestic player by Chennai Super Kings (CSK) for the inaugural season of the Indian Premier League (IPL) in 2008. He made his debut for the Chennai Super Kings during the 2009 season and represented the team for eight consecutive seasons till 2015. His break through season came in 2010 when he took 13 wickets to help Chennai win their first IPL title and qualify for Champions League Twenty20. Chennai won the Champions league title in 2010 with Ashwin being named player of the series. Ashwin was the fourth highest wicket taker with 20 wickets in the 2011 Indian Premier League season, helping Chennai win a second consecutive title. Ashwin won his second Champions League Twenty20 title in 2014 with CSK. Ashwin took 90 wickets from 97 matches in the IPL across eight seasons for the Super Kings.

Following the two-year suspension of Chennai Super Kings and Rajasthan Royals, two new franchises Rising Pune Supergiants and Gujarat Lions were established for the 2016 Indian Premier League season. Supergiants picked Ashwin as one of their five draft picks on 15 December 2015 for ₹75 million (US$800,000). He took ten wickets in the 2016 season before being ruled out of 2017 season due to an injury. In the 2018 player auction, Ashwin was picked up by Punjab Kings for ₹75 million (US$800,000). He was appointed as captain of Punjab for the 2018 season. In March 2019, in a match against Rajasthan Royals, Ashwin ran out a batter "backing up" (Jos Buttler), reigniting a debate around the mode of dismissal. This ultimately led to a rule change by MCC that the Law on running out the non-striker would be moved into Law 38 (Run Out) rather than Law 41 (Unfair Play).

Ahead of the 2020 season, Ashwin was traded to Delhi Capitals. He took 13 wickets in the season and was the fourth highest-wicket taker in the team. Delhi retained him for the 2021 season. In the 2022 IPL Auction, Ashwin was bought by the Rajasthan Royals for ₹50 million (US$530,000). During the group stage match against Lucknow Super Giants in the 2022 season, he tactically retired out in the 19th over, becoming the first cricketer in IPL to do so. He took 12 wickets and scored 191 runs to take Rajasthan to the finals of the 2022 season. In April 2022, Ashwin became only the second off-spinner after Harbhajan Singh to take 150 wickets in IPL and is the joint-fifth highest-wicket taker in the league alongside Sunil Narine with 180 wickets. In the 2025 player auction, Ashwin was picked up by the Chennai Super Kings for ₹97.5 million (US$1.0 million). After one season with the Super Kings, he announced his retirement from IPL on 27 August 2025.

=== TNPL and TNCA League ===
Ashwin was drafted in as the captain of the Dindigul Dragons franchise for the inaugural season of the Tamil Nadu Premier League (TNPL) T20 tournament. He has represented the same franchise for eight seasons, leading them to the title in the 2024 season and two finals in 2018 and 2019. He played for Chemplast in the TNCA first division league until 2018 when he moved to Mylapore RC. He signed on to represent India Cements in 2020.

=== Major League ===
In March 2026, Ashwin signed with the San Francisco Unicorns for the 2026 Major League Cricket season.

== Bowling style ==
Ashwin is widely regarded as one of the most prolific off spinners of all time. He produces several variations of the ball and flights the ball, thereby giving it more chance to spin and dip on the batsman. In addition to his normal off-breaks, he produces an arm ball and the carrom ball, the latter of which he uses frequently in the shorter formats. In IPL 2013, he bowled leg-breaks and googly as well. He evolved his carrom ball from the soduku ball, a finger-flicked legbreak used in tennis ball cricket on the streets of Chennai. However, he has stated in an interview that he refrains from bowling the doosra as it requires him to bend and straighten his arm which he finds difficult to do.

Ashwin's childhood coach Sunil Subramaniam recalls Ashwin's early days at the TNCA Academy:

[...] what struck me was his intelligence. His use of angles, length and width of the crease. Also, guessing what a batsman was likely to do. And the kind of field placing that he is comfortable with. Those are the factors that struck me immediately – that this guy not only loves bowling, he also has a fair idea of what spin actually is. For somebody who started out at 18 or 19, I thought that was a big thing [...] Here is a guy who knew what the ball is supposed to do, where this guy is expected to play and what are the plans to keep that guy in check and put pressure on that guy. He was pretty clear at 18 itself.

== Records and achievements ==
- Fastest to reach 250, 300 and 350 wickets in test cricket (in terms of matches)
- Fastest Indian to reach 50, 100, 150, 200, 250, 300, 350, 400, 450 and 500 test wickets (in terms of matches)
- Only Indian cricketer to score a century and take five wickets in the same Test match on four separate instances
- First Indian to take 50 T20I wickets
- Most Man of the Series awards in tests (11)
- Second most five wicket hauls in tests (37) and fastest to 25 five wicket hauls
- Second highest wicket taker in tests for India (537)
- Second Indian to score 500 runs and take 50 wickets in a calendar year (2016)
- Highest wicket-taker in a single season (82)
- Most dismissals of left-handers in tests
- Second Indian bowler to take 300 Test wickets at home
- Second Indian to take 750 international wickets and third Indian to take 700 international wickets
- One of the three all rounders to achieve the double of 3000 runs and 500 wickets in tests
- Most wickets in India (383)
- Second highest ever rating points by an Indian bowler ever in Tests in the ICC rankings (904)

== Honours ==
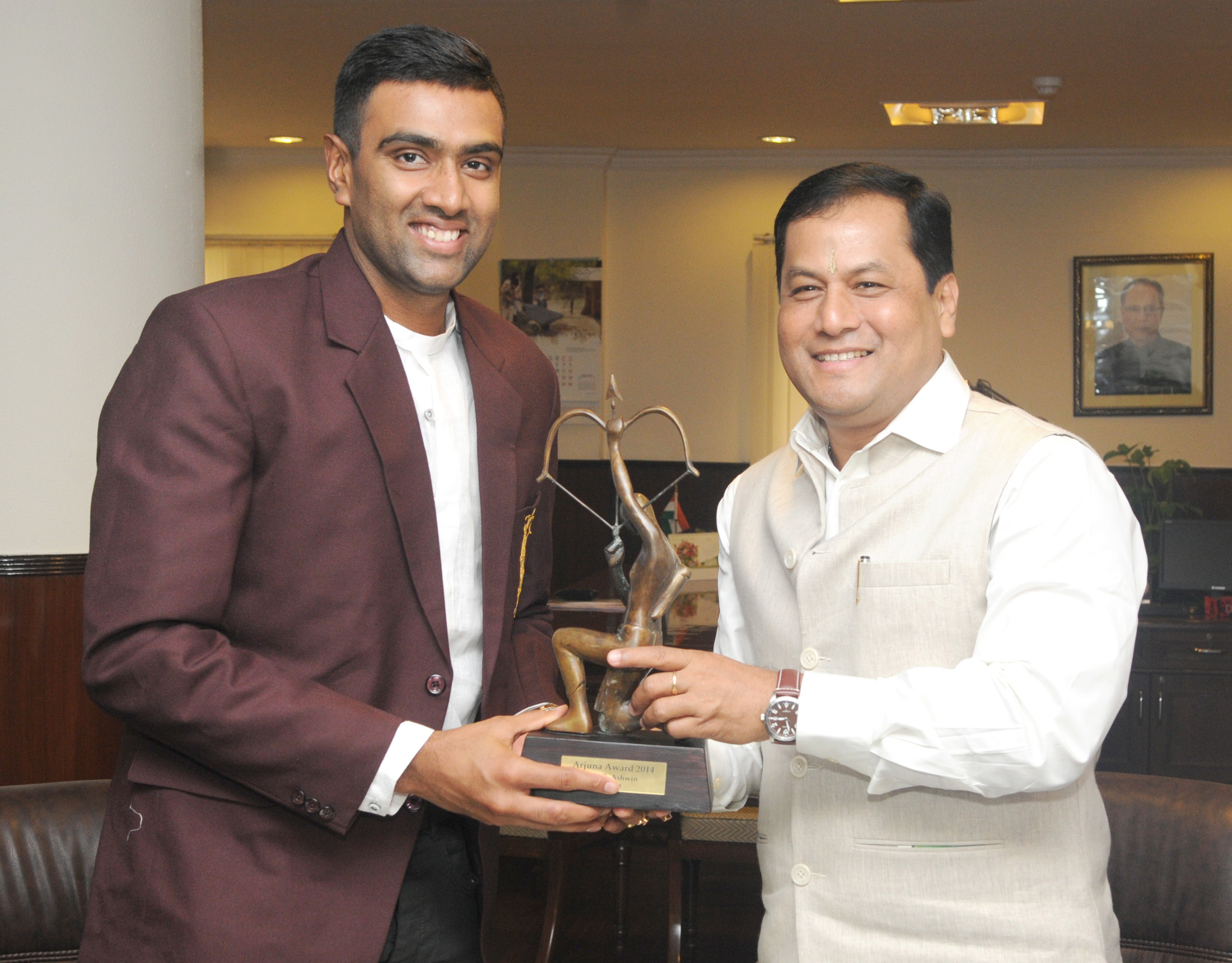
Ashwin receiving the Arjuna Award from Sarbananda Sonowal, then minister of Minister of Sports

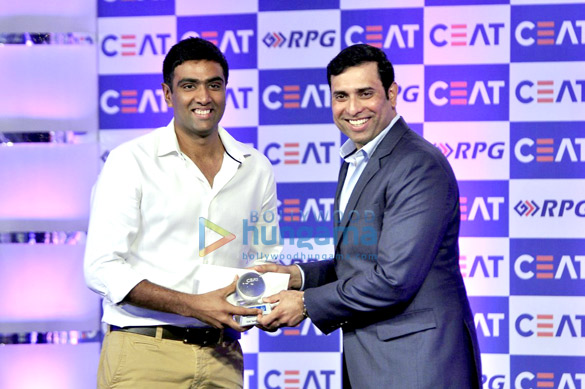
Ashwin receiving the CEAT award from VVS Laxman

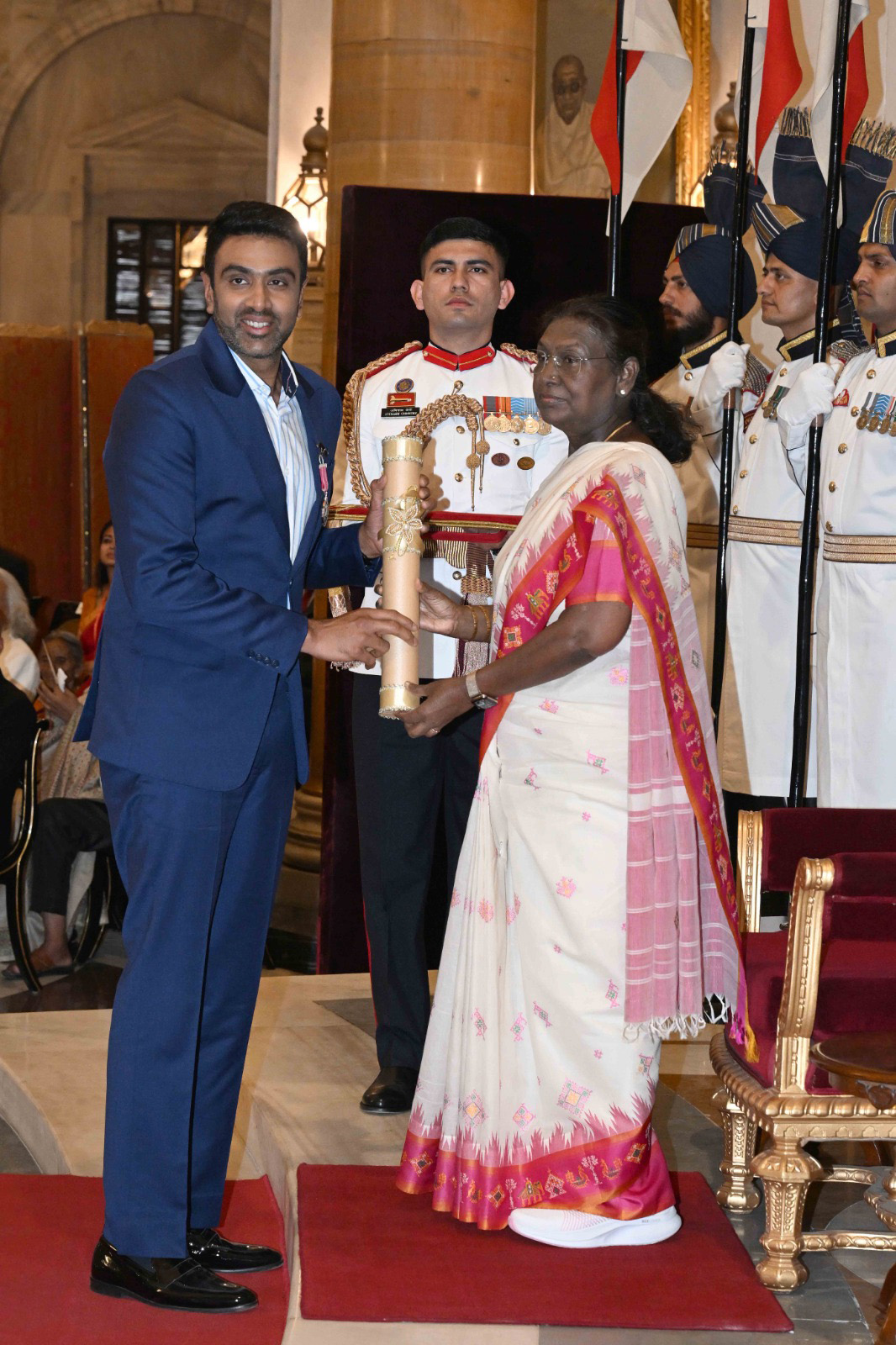
Ashwin receiving the Padma Shri award from president Droupadi Murmu

=== India ===
- Asia Cup: 2010, 2016
- Cricket World Cup: 2011
- ICC Champions Trophy: 2013

=== Chennai Super Kings ===
- Indian Premier League: 2010, 2011
- Champions League: 2010, 2014

=== Individual ===
- Polly Umrigar Award: 2012-13
- Arjuna award: 2015
- ICC Men's Cricketer of the Year: 2016
- ICC Men's Test Cricketer of the Year: 2016
- ICC Men's Test Team of the Year: 2013, 2015, 2016, 2017, 2021
- CEAT International Cricketer of the Year: 2016–17
- ICC Men's Test Team of the Decade: 2011-20
- ICC Men's Player of the Month: February 2021
- Padma Shri: 2025

=== Others ===
In March 2025, the Greater Chennai Corporation approved the renaming of Ramakrishnapuram first street in West Mambalam, where Ashwin resides, as Ravichandran Ashwin street in his honour. In 2026, ESPNcricinfo ranked Ashwin 25th in its list of the greatest men's international cricketers of the 21st century.

== Career statistics ==
Ashwin's Test cricket record
| | Mat | Runs | Best | Bat Avg. | 100s | 50s | Wickets | Bowl Avg. | 5WI | 10WM |
|---|---|---|---|---|---|---|---|---|---|---|
| Home | 65 | 1989 | 124 | 26.17 | 4 | 8 | 383 | 21.57 | 29 | 6 |
| Away | 39 | 1456 | 118 | 26.00 | 2 | 6 | 149 | 30.40 | 8 | 2 |
| Neutral | 1 | 29 | 22 | 14.50 | 0 | 0 | 4 | 11.25 | 0 | 0 |
| Total | 105 | 3474 | 124 | 25.92 | 6 | 14 | 536 | 23.95 | 37 | 8 |

Ashwin has scored more than 4000 runs in international cricket. He has scored six centuries and 14 half-centuries in Tests to go with a single half-century in ODIs.

Ashwin has taken more than 700 wickets in international cricket and more than 500 wickets in Tests, placing him amongst the top ten wicket takers in Tests. Ashwin has been more prolific in home conditions, where he has taken more than 350 wickets at an average of under 22.

Ashwin scored a century and taken five wickets in the same Test match on three separate instances. He scored more than 500 runs and took more than 50 wickets in 2016, becoming the second Indian after Kapil Dev to do so. Ashwin has won eleven Man of the Series awards in Tests, the most for any player along with Muttiah Muralitharan.

=== Centuries ===
Following is the list of the six centuries scored by Ashwin in international cricket.

| No. | Score | Against | Pos. | Inn. | Venue | H/A | Date | Result | Ref |
|---|---|---|---|---|---|---|---|---|---|
| 1 | 103 | West Indies | 8 | 2 | Wankhede Stadium, Mumbai | Home | 22 November 2011 | Won | |
| 2 | 124 | West Indies | 8 | 2 | Eden Gardens, Kolkata | Home | 26 November 2013 | Won | |
| 3 | 113 | West Indies | 6 | 1 | Sir Vivian Richards Stadium, North Sound | Away | 21 July 2016 | Won | |
| 4 | 118 | West Indies | 6 | 1 | Daren Sammy Cricket Ground, Gros Islet | Away | 9 August 2016 | Won | |
| 5 | 106 | England | 8 | 3 | M. A. Chidambaram Stadium, Chennai | Home | 13 February 2021 | Won | |
| 6 | 113 | Bangladesh | 8 | 1 | M. A. Chidambaram Stadium, Chennai | Home | 19 September 2024 | Won | |

=== Man of the Series ===
Following is the list of the man of the series awards won by Ashwin in international cricket.

| No. | Season | Against | H/A | Type | Matches | Runs | Wickets | Result |
|---|---|---|---|---|---|---|---|---|
| 1 | 2011-12 | West Indies | Home | Test | 3 | 121 | 22 | Won (2–0) |
| 2 | 2012 | New Zealand | Home | Test | 2 | 69 | 18 | Won (2–0) |
| 3 | 2012-13 | Australia | Home | Test | 4 | 20 | 29 | Won (4–0) |
| 4 | 2015 | Sri Lanka | Away | Test | 3 | 94 | 21 | Won (2–1) |
| 5 | 2015-16 | Sri Lanka | Home | T20I | 3 | 31 | 9 | Won (2–1) |
| 6 | 2015-16 | South Africa | Home | Test | 4 | 101 | 31 | Won (3–0) |
| 7 | 2016 | West Indies | Away | Test | 4 | 235 | 17 | Won (2–0) |
| 8 | 2016-17 | New Zealand | Home | Test | 3 | 71 | 27 | Won (3–0) |
| 9 | 2020-21 | England | Home | Test | 4 | 189 | 32 | Won (3–1) |
| 10 | 2021-22 | New Zealand | Home | Test | 2 | 70 | 14 | Won (1–0) |
| 11 | 2022-23 | Australia | Home | Test | 4 | 86 | 25 | Won (2–1) |
| 12 | 2024-25 | Bangladesh | Home | Test | 2 | 114 | 11 | Won (2–0) |

== Other ventures ==
Ashwin runs his own YouTube channel where he does analysis of cricket matches, interviews and movie reviews. Ashwin runs a cricket academy called "Gen-Next Cricket Institute" in Chennai where he mentors young kids. In 2016, Ashwin appeared in videos circulated by the Tamil Nadu State Election Commission to help create electoral awareness by encouraging voters to check whether their names were on the electoral roll.

In June 2024, Ashwin released his memoir titled I have the streets: A kutti cricket story, which he had co-authored with sports writer Sidharth Monga.

== See also ==
- List of India cricketers who have taken five-wicket hauls on Test debut
- List of bowlers who have taken 300 or more wickets in Test cricket
- Prasanna Agoram

Awards
| Preceded by Steve Smith | Sir Garfield Sobers Trophy; 2016 | Succeeded by Virat Kohli |
| Preceded by Steve Smith | ICC Men's Test Cricketer of the Year; 2016 | Succeeded by Steve Smith |
