= V. Athisayaraj Davidson =

Indian cricketer (born 1992)

Personal information
- Born: 6 June 1992 (age 34); Thoothukudi, Tamil Nadu, India
- Source: Cricinfo, 3 October 2018

V. Athisayaraj Davidson (born 6 June 1992) is an Indian cricketer. He made his List A debut for Tamil Nadu in the 2018–19 Vijay Hazare Trophy on 3 October 2018.
