= Shahrukh Khan (cricketer) =

Indian cricketer (born 1995)

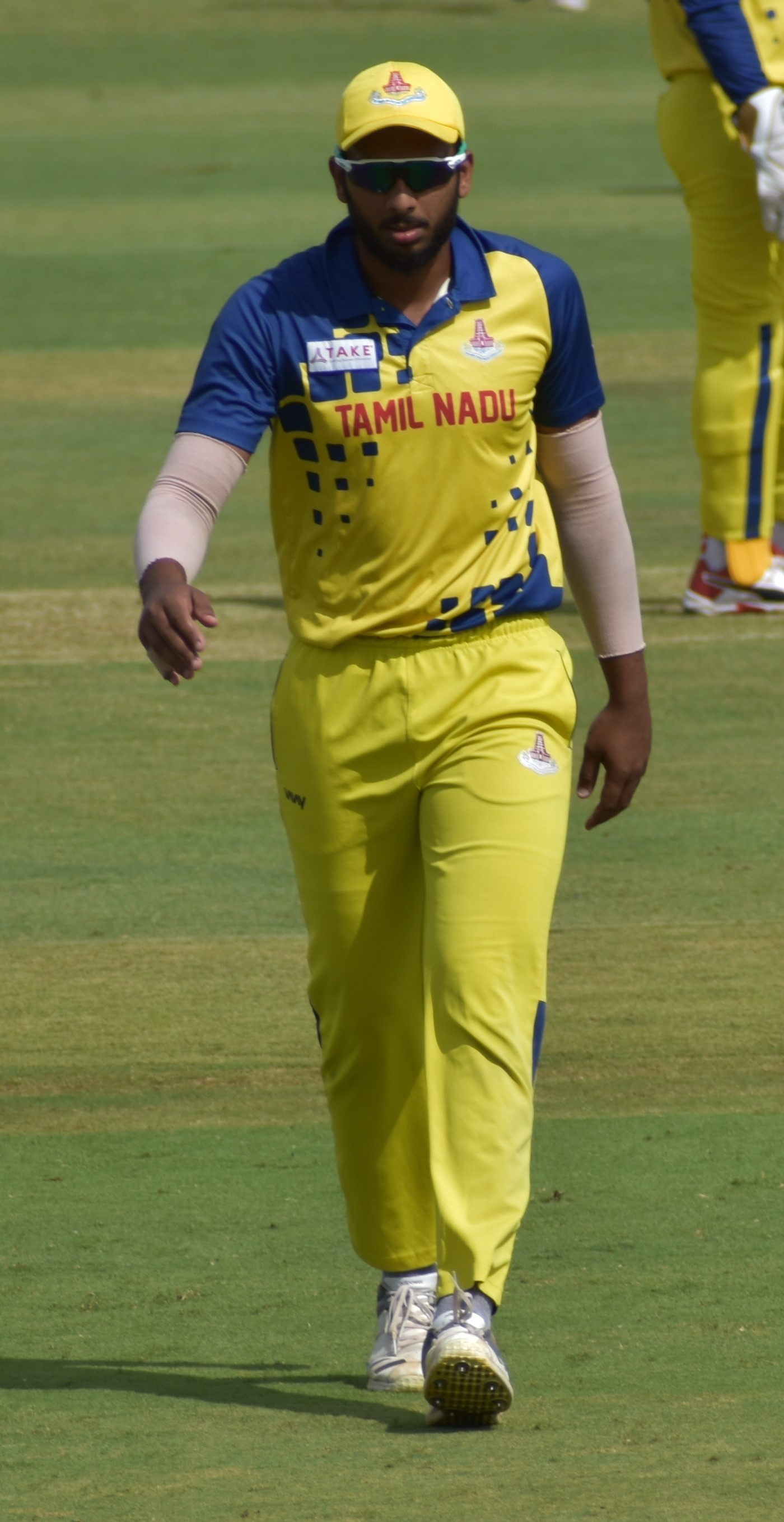
- Khan during the 2019–20 Vijay Hazare Trophy

Personal information
- Full name: Masood Shahrukh Khan
- Born: 27 May 1995 (age 31); Chennai, Tamil Nadu, India
- Height: 1.93 m (6 ft 4 in)
- Batting: Right-handed
- Bowling: Right-arm off break
- Role: Batter

Domestic team information
- Years: Team
- 2014–: Tamil Nadu
- 2021–2023: Punjab Kings
- 2024–present: Gujarat Titans

Career statistics
| Competition | FC | LA | T20 |
|---|---|---|---|
| Matches | 19 | 48 | 116 |
| Runs scored | 886 | 1,034 | 1,389 |
| Batting average | 36.91 | 43.08 | 19.29 |
| 100s/50s | 1/6 | 1/7 | 0/2 |
| Top score | 194 | 132* | 58 |
| Balls bowled | 389 | 122 | 194 |
| Wickets | 4 | 3 | 8 |
| Bowling average | 51.50 | 40.66 | 34.62 |
| 5 wickets in innings | 0 | 0 | 0 |
| 10 wickets in match | 0 | – | – |
| Best bowling | 3/36 | 1/1 | 2/19 |
| Catches/stumpings | 21/– | 17/– | 46/– |
- Source: ESPNcricinfo, 29 December 2025

Masood Shahrukh Khan (born 27 May 1995) is an Indian cricketer who plays as a Batter for the Tamil Nadu in domestic cricket. He is a right-handed batter and an off spin bowler. In the 2024 IPL auction, he was signed by Gujarat Titans who bid 7.4 crore for his services. Khan has played for Punjab Kings in the Indian Premier League (IPL) from 2021 to 2023.

== Career ==
Khan made his List A debut on 27 February 2014, for the Tamil Nadu in the 2013–14 Vijay Hazare Trophy. He made his first-class debut for Tamil Nadu in the 2018–19 Ranji Trophy on 6 December 2018.

Khan was part of the Tamil Nadu side that went unbeaten all season on their way to winning the Syed Mushtaq Ali Trophy in 2021. Khan contributed an unbeaten 40 from 19 balls in the Quarter Final vs Himachal Pradesh.

In February 2021, Khan was bought by the Punjab Kings in the IPL auction ahead of the 2021 Indian Premier League. He made his IPL debut on 12 April 2021 against Rajasthan Royals and scored an unbeaten 6 off 4 balls. He was handed his maiden IPL cap by Chris Gayle. He was bought by Gujarat Titans in the auction ahead of the 2024 IPL. Khan was the ninth most valuable player in the auction.

In January 2022, Khan was named as one of two standby players in India's Twenty20 International (T20I) squad for their home series against the West Indies. In February 2022, he was bought by the Punjab Kings in the auction for the 2022 Indian Premier League tournament. Later the same month, in the opening round of matches in the 2021–22 Ranji Trophy, Khan scored 194 runs for Tamil Nadu against Delhi.
