= Baba Aparajith =

Indian cricketer

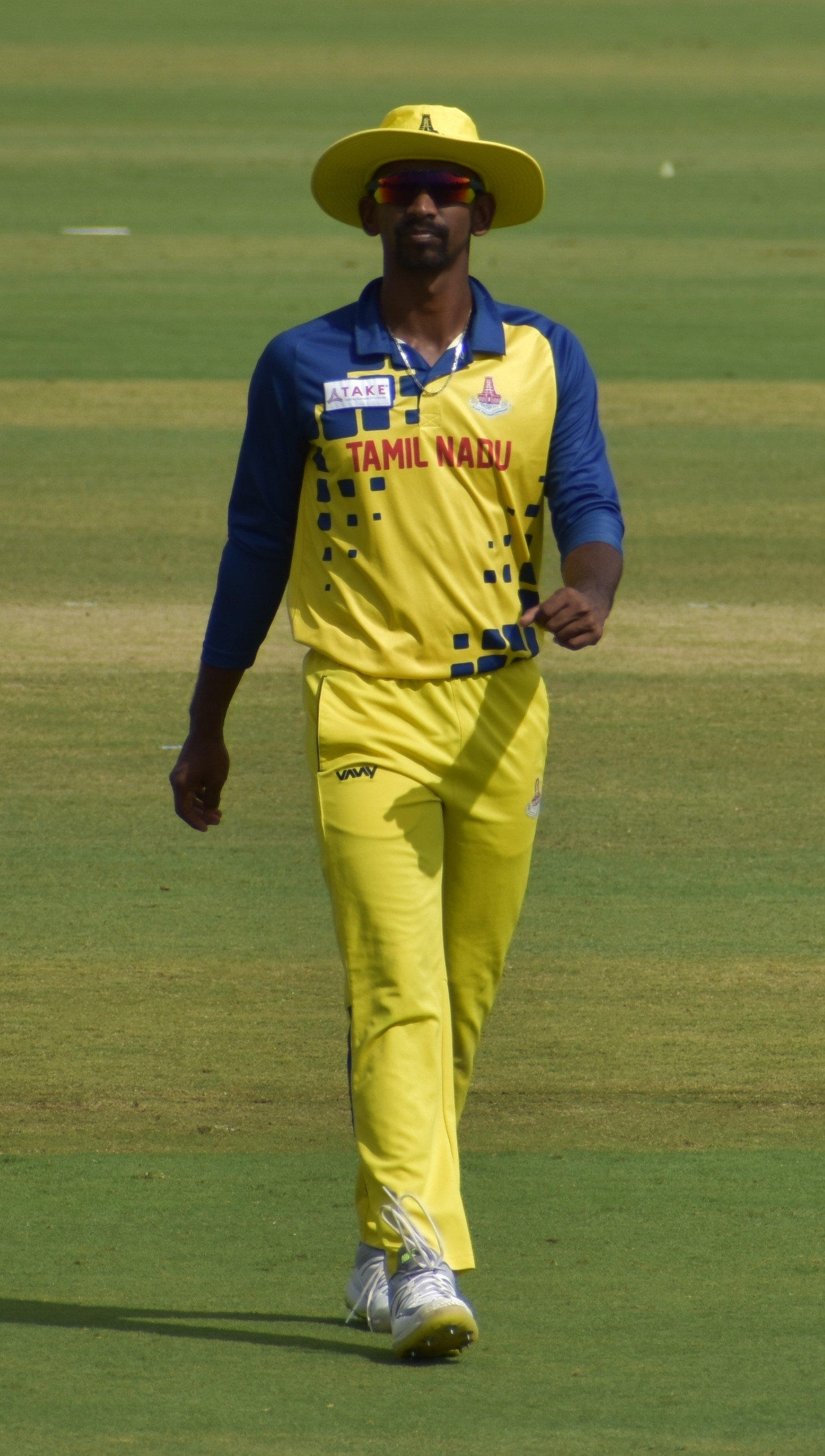
- Aparajith during the 2019–20 Vijay Hazare Trophy

Personal information
- Born: 8 July 1994 (age 32); Madras, Tamil Nadu, India
- Batting: Right-handed
- Bowling: Right arm off break
- Role: Batting All-rounder
- Relatives: Baba Indrajith (twin-brother)

Domestic team information
- Years: Team
- 2011/12–2023/24: Tamil Nadu
- 2021/22: Rugpanj Tigers
- 2024/25: Kerala

Career statistics
Competition	FC	LA	T20
Matches	96	107	63
Runs scored	4,697	3,869	1,147
Batting average	38.18	42.98	27.30
100s/50s	11/23	7/27	0/4
Top score	212	137	67
Balls bowled	5,327	2,465	362
Wickets	66	71	17
Bowling average	40.87	28.80	21.41
5 wickets in innings	1	0	0
10 wickets in match	0	0	0
Best bowling	5/86	4/30	2/9
Catches/stumpings	90/–	50/–	31/–
- Source: ESPNcricinfo, 14 October 2024

Baba Aparajith (born 8 July 1994) is an Indian cricketer who plays as an all-rounder. He is a right-handed batsman and off break bowler, who plays first-class cricket for Kerala having previously represented Tamil Nadu. He played for the India Under-19 cricket team in the 2012 Under-19 World Cup. He was a member of the Chennai Super Kings squad in the Indian Premier League for five seasons without making an appearance.

On 4 October 2013 he scored his first double century playing for South Zone against West Zone in the Duleep Trophy.

He was the leading run-scorer for Tamil Nadu in the 2017–18 Ranji Trophy, with 417 runs in four matches. In July 2018, he was named in the squad for India Red for the 2018–19 Duleep Trophy. in October 2019, he was named in India B's squad for the 2019–20 Deodhar Trophy.
