= Washington Sundar =

Indian cricketer (born 1999)

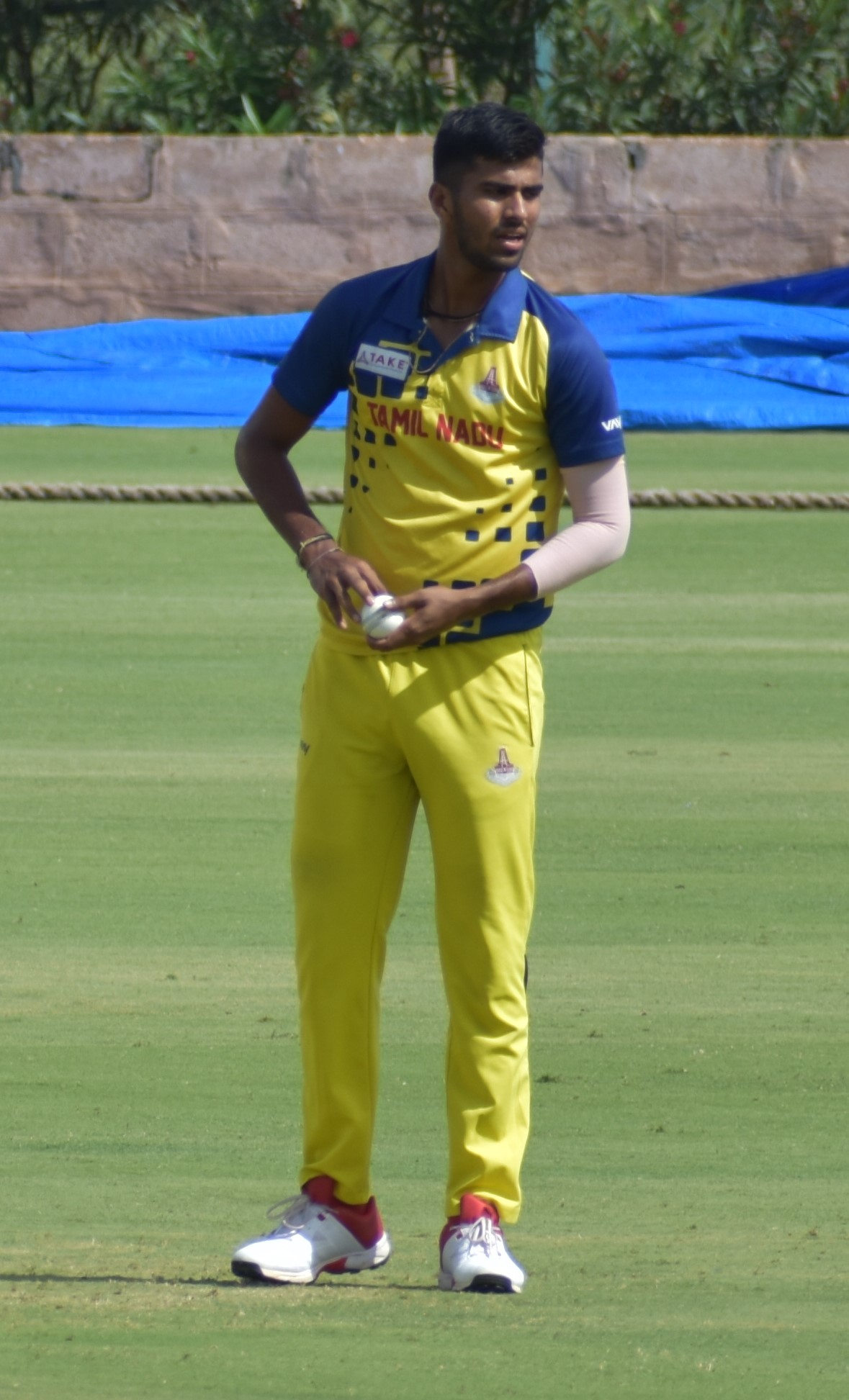
- Sundar during 2019–20 Vijay Hazare Trophy

Personal information
- Born: 5 October 1999 (age 27); Chennai, Tamil Nadu, India
- Nickname: Washi
- Height: 1.85 m (6 ft 1 in)
- Batting: Left-handed
- Bowling: Right-arm off break
- Role: All-rounder

International information
- National side: India (2017–present)
- Test debut (cap 301): 15 January 2021 v Australia
- Last Test: 22 November 2025 v South Africa
- ODI debut (cap 220): 13 December 2017 v Sri Lanka
- Last ODI: 14 July 2026 v England
- ODI shirt no.: 5
- T20I debut (cap 72): 24 December 2017 v Sri Lanka
- Last T20I: 22 February 2026 v South Africa
- T20I shirt no.: 5

Domestic team information
- Years: Team
- 2016–present: Tamil Nadu
- 2017: Rising Pune Supergiant
- 2018–2021: Royal Challengers Bangalore
- 2022–2024: Sunrisers Hyderabad
- 2022: Lancashire
- 2025: Hampshire
- 2025–present: Gujarat Titans

Career statistics
Competition	Test	ODI	T20I	FC
Matches	18	34	65	51
Runs scored	937	445	286	2342
Batting average	44.61	22.25	15.88	35.48
100s/50s	1/6	0/2	0/1	3/14
Top score	101*	52*	50	159
Balls bowled	2,294	1,134	1,109	6,604
Wickets	41	30	56	110
Bowling average	30.34	30.53	23.42	29.83
5 wickets in innings	1	0	0	4
10 wickets in match	1	0	0	2
Best bowling	7/59	3/30	3/3	7/59
Catches/stumpings	6/–	7/–	21/–	25/–
Medal record
Men's cricket
Representing India
ICC Champions Trophy
Winner	2025 Pakistan
ICC T20 World Cup
Winner	2026 India & Sri Lanka
ACC Asia Cup
Winner	2023 Pakistan
Asian Games
Gold medal – first place	2022 Hangzhou
Gold medal – first place	2026 Aichi-Nagoya
ICC U19 World Cup
Runner-up	2016 Bangladesh
- Source: ESPNcricinfo, 24 January 2026

Washington Sundar (Tamil: [sun̪d̪aɾ]; born 5 October 1999) is an Indian international cricketer. He plays for the India national team as an all-rounder, who bats left-handed and bowls right-arm off-spin. He represents Tamil Nadu in domestic cricket and Gujarat Titans in the Indian Premier League. Sundar was a part of the Indian squad that won the 2023 Asia Cup, 2025 Champions Trophy, and the 2026 T20 World Cup.

== Early life ==
Washington Sundar was born in a Tamil Hindu family on 5 October 1999 in Chennai, Tamil Nadu. His sister Shailaja Sundar (also known as M. S. Shailaja) is also a professional cricketer. His father, Mani Sundar, was a keen cricketer who was in consideration for Tamil Nadu's state team. Sundar was named after P. D. Washington, a retired army officer who supported Mani Sundar financially during his playing days.

Sundar started playing cricket from the age of four or five. He received his early education from St. Bede's Anglo Indian Higher Secondary School, and completed an undergraduate degree from the Hindustan Institute of Technology and Science, Chennai.

== Domestic career ==
Sundar made his first-class debut for Tamil Nadu in the 2016–17 Ranji Trophy on 6 October 2016. Like Ravichandran Ashwin before him, Sundar went from being a batsman as a youngster to making his name as an off-spinner. In October 2017, he scored his maiden first-class century for Tamil Nadu against Tripura in the 2017–18 Ranji Trophy. He was also selected for the national U-19 team for the 2016 U-19 World Cup.

== IPL career ==
In 2017, he was selected by Rising Pune Supergiants as a replacement for Ravichandran Ashwin. He made his Twenty20 debut in the 2017 Indian Premier League on 22 April 2017. He had received the Player of the Match award in the first qualifier played between Mumbai Indians and Pune Supergiants, in which he took 3 wickets for 16 runs.

In January 2018, he was bought by the Royal Challengers Bangalore in the 2018 IPL auction. In October the same year, he was named in India C's squad for the 2018–19 Deodhar Trophy.

In the 2022 IPL Auction, Sundar was bought by the Sunrisers Hyderabad for ₹8.75 crores.

In August 2022, Sundar played for Lancashire County Cricket Club in the Royal London One-Day Cup and the County Championship. He claimed a five-wicket haul in his debut match against Northamptonshire County Cricket Club.

In the IPL 2025 auction, Washington Sundar was acquired by Gujarat Titans for ₹3.2 crore.

== International career ==
Sundar playing a Test match for India against New Zealand in November 2026

In November 2017, Sundar was named in India's Twenty20 International squad for their series against Sri Lanka. Earlier, he was also added to India's One Day International (ODI) squad for the same series, after Kedar Jadhav suffered a hamstring injury. He made his ODI debut for India against Sri Lanka on 13 December 2017, his first international wicket being that of Lahiru Thirimanne. He then made his T20I debut for India against Sri Lanka on 24 December 2017. At the age of 18 years and 80 days, he became the youngest player to debut for India in T20Is.

In March 2018, Sundar was selected in India's squad for the 2018 Nidahas Trophy against Sri Lanka and Bangladesh. He was praised by many for his economical bowling inside the powerplay at an economy of less than 6 runs an over. During the series, he bagged a maiden 3-wicket haul, making him the youngest T20I player to do so. He was named the Player of the Series for his performance. He then became a regular member of the Indian T20I team.

Sundar was initially picked for India's 2020–21 Australia tour only as a net bowler. However, injuries to fellow bowlers and the inability for India to fly in replacements at short notice due to quarantine restrictions in effect during the COVID-19 pandemic, saw him win an unexpected first Test cap on 15 January, in the final Test match of the series at The Gabba. His first Test wicket was Steve Smith, and he scored 62 in his first Test innings in a crucial seventh wicket partnership of 123 with Shardul Thakur which kept India from facing a huge first innings deficit and contributed greatly to India's eventual victory in the Test. With his maiden Test fifty, Sundar became the third Indian to score a half-century on Test debut in Australia.

In October 2024, Sundar picked up his maiden ten-wicket haul in test cricket against New Zealand. In the 4th match of the Anderson–Tendulkar Trophy he scored his maiden test century against England. In the 2nd innings of the fifth match of the Indian cricket team in England in 2025 he scored 53 runs taking India to a huge score of 396 on bowling friendly pitch.
