= Baba Indrajith =

Indian cricketer

Personal information
- Born: 8 July 1994 (age 32); Chennai, Tamil Nadu, India
- Batting: Right-handed
- Bowling: Right-arm leg break
- Relatives: Baba Aparajith (twin-brother)

Domestic team information
- Years: Team
- 2013–present: Tamil Nadu
- 2022: Kolkata Knight Riders
- FC debut: 28 November 2013 Tamil Nadu v Saurashtra
- T20 debut: 1 April 2014 Tamil Nadu v Goa

Career statistics
Competition	FC	LA	T20
Matches	83	66	30
Runs scored	5,599	1,841	546
Batting average	51.84	47.20	21.00
100s/50s	16/29	2/13	0/1
Top score	200	103*	78
Catches/stumpings	120/1	36/0	9/0
- Source: ESPNcricinfo, 25 March 2025

Baba Indrajith (born 8 July 1994) is an Indian cricketer who plays for the Tamil Nadu cricket team. Indrajith is a right hand batsman and legbreak bowler and an occasional wicket-keeper. He plays first-class cricket for Tamil Nadu. In September 2017, he scored his first double-century in first-class cricket, playing for India Red in the 2017–18 Duleep Trophy.

In July 2018, he was named in the squad for India Green for the 2018–19 Duleep Trophy. In the opening fixture of the tournament, he made a century, scoring 109 runs. He was the leading run-scorer for India Green in the tournament, with 149 runs in two matches.

He was the leading run-scorer for Tamil Nadu in the 2018–19 Ranji Trophy, with 641 runs in eight matches. In February 2022, he was bought by the Kolkata Knight Riders in the auction for the 2022 Indian Premier League tournament as a wicket-keeper batsman. Indrajith finished the 2021-22 Ranji Trophy season as the leading run-scorer for Tamil Nadu, with 396 runs in three matches, at an average of 99, with three centuries.
