= Sai Kishore =

Indian cricketer (born 1996)

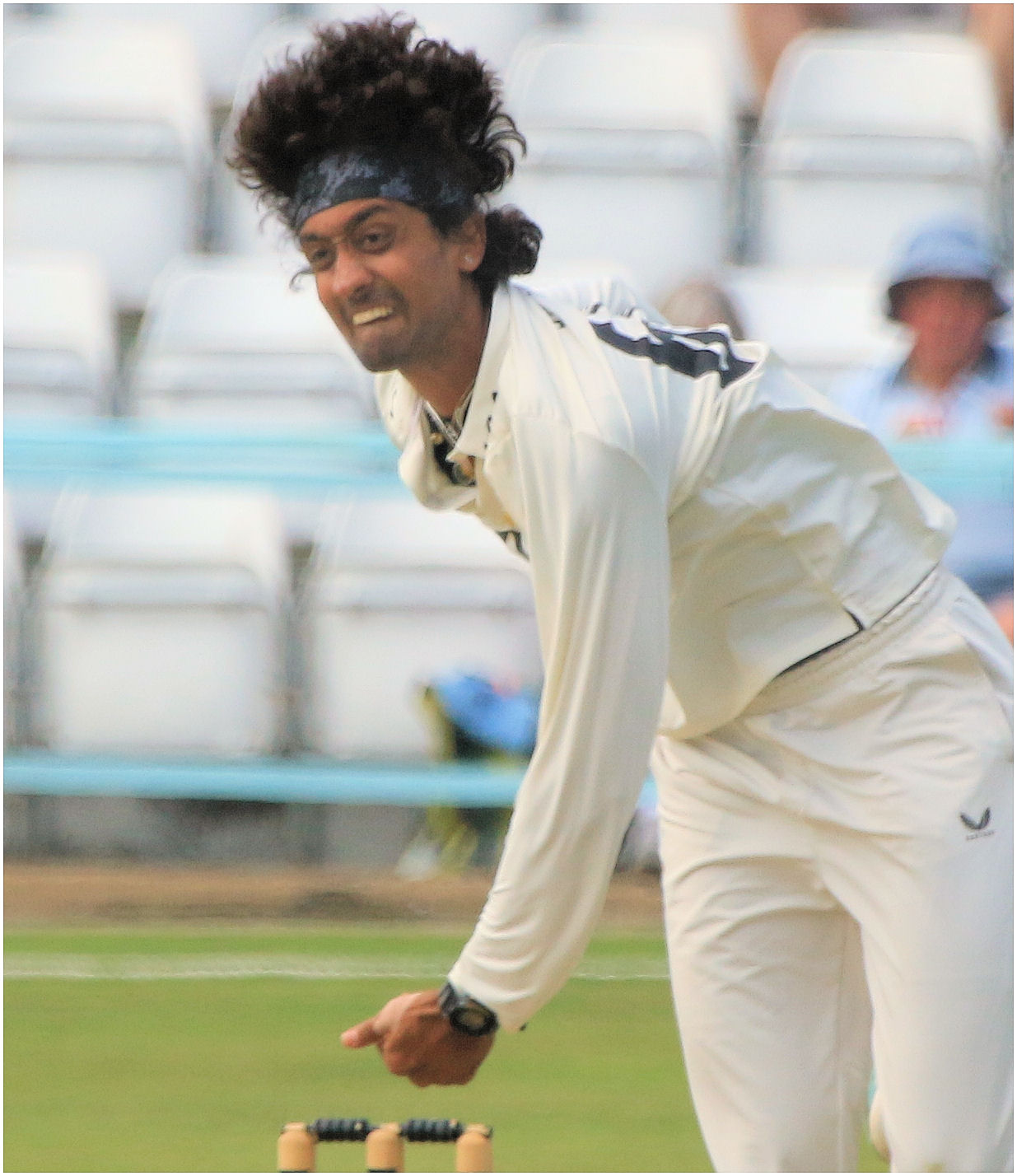
- Kishore playing for Surrey in 2025

Personal information
- Full name: Ravisrinivasan Sai Kishore
- Born: 6 November 1996 (age 30); Chennai, Tamil Nadu, India
- Height: 1.96 m (6 ft 5 in)
- Batting: Left-handed
- Bowling: Slow left-arm orthodox
- Role: All-rounder

International information
- National side: India (2023)
- T20I debut (cap 108): 3 October 2023 v Nepal
- Last T20I: 7 October 2023 v Afghanistan
- T20I shirt no.: 60

Domestic team information
- Years: Team
- 2017–present: Tamil Nadu
- 2022–present: Gujarat Titans
- 2025: Surrey
- 2026: Gloucestershire

Career statistics
Competition	T20I	FC	LA	T20
Matches	3	60	67	94
Runs scored	0	1,108	539	201
Batting average	–	15.38	18.58	10.57
100s/50s	0/0	0/4	0/2	0/1
Top score	–	81	74	87*
Balls bowled	72	13,125	3,328	1,884
Wickets	4	245	105	101
Bowling average	15.75	24.28	23.42	21.03
5 wickets in innings	0	15	2	0
10 wickets in match	0	1	0	0
Best bowling	3/12	7/70	5/26	4/6
Catches/stumpings	3/–	17/–	33/–	28/–
Medal record
Men's cricket
Representing India
Asian Games
Gold medal – first place	2022 Hangzhou	Team
- Source: ESPNcricinfo, 27 September 2026

Ravisrinivasan Sai Kishore (born 6 November 1996) is an Indian cricketer who plays for Tamil Nadu in domestic cricket and Gujarat Titans in the IPL. He is primarily a left-arm orthodox bowler, and also bats left-handed. He made his T20I debut for India on 3 October 2023 in the Asian Games.

== Domestic career ==
He made his List A debut for Tamil Nadu in the 2016–17 Vijay Hazare Trophy on 12 March 2017. He made his first-class debut for Tamil Nadu in the 2017–18 Ranji Trophy on 14 October 2017. He made his Twenty20 debut for Tamil Nadu in the 2017–18 Zonal T20 League on 8 January 2018.

He was the leading wicket-taker for Tamil Nadu in the 2018–19 Ranji Trophy, with 22 dismissals in six matches. He topped the wicket-takers list in the 2019–20 Syed Mushtaq Ali Trophy with 20 wickets in 12 matches at an economy rate of 4.63.

== Indian Premier League ==
In the 2020 IPL auction, he was bought by the Chennai Super Kings at a base price of ₹20 lakh for the 2020 Indian Premier League. He was bought by the Gujarat Titans at a price of ₹3 crore in the 2022 Indian Premier League (IPL) auction.

== International career ==
In June 2021, he was named as one of five net bowlers for India's tour of Sri Lanka. Following a positive case for COVID-19 in the Indian team, Kishore was added to India's main squad for their final two Twenty20 International (T20I) matches of the tour.

In January 2022, he was named as one of two standby players in India's T20I squad for their home series against the West Indies.

He was part of the Indian squad at the 2022 Asian Games in Hangzhou, China, which won the gold medal. He took 1/25 runs in 4 overs in his debut match against Nepal. In the semifinal against Bangladesh, he picked 3/12 in his 4 overs.
