= Arun Karthik =

Indian cricketer (born 1986)

Personal information
- Full name: Konda Bhaskar Arun Karthik
- Born: 15 February 1986 (age 40); Walajapet, Tamil Nadu, India
- Batting: Right-handed
- Bowling: Leg break googly
- Role: Wicket-keeper-batsman

Domestic team information
- Years: Team
- 2007-2008: Badureliya Sports Club
- 2007–2014: Tamil Nadu
- 2010: Chennai Super Kings
- 2011–2013: Royal Challengers Bangalore
- 2014–2017: Assam
- 2017: Victoria SC
- 2017-2019: Kerala
- 2019-2020: Puducherry
- 2020–2021: Tamil Nadu
- 2022-present: Puducherry
- Source: ESPNcricinfo

Konda Bhaskar Arun Karthik (born 15 February 1986 in Walajapet, Tamil Nadu) is an Indian cricketer, who currently plays for Puducherry and was a member of the Royal Challengers Bangalore squad. Karthik is a right-hand batsman and leg-spin bowler. He was a wicket-keeper batsman for Royal Challengers Bangalore.

Karthik made his List A debut for Sri Lankan side Badureliya Sports Club in November 2007, scoring 38. He was an ever-present in the Badureliya one-day team during the 2007–08 season and finished as their highest runscorer.

In November 2008 Karthik made his first-class debut for Tamil Nadu against Karnataka, opening the innings he scored 149, sharing in a 246-run stand with Vidyut Sivaramakrishnan.

For the 2019–20 Ranji Trophy tournament, he moved from Kerala to Puducherry cricket team.
