= List of South Zone cricketers =

This is a list of all cricketers who have played first-class or List A cricket for South Zone cricket team.

Last updated at the end of the 2015/16 season.

== A–F ==
- Mohammad Abdul Hai
- Jayasoorya Abhiram
- Syed Abid Ali
- Alfred Absolem
- Linganatha Adisesh
- Mayank Agarwal
- Fayaz Ahmed
- Ghulam Ahmed
- Habib Ahmed
- Shoaib Ahmed
- Edulji Aibara
- Neravanda Aiyappa
- Shahid Akbar
- Balachandra Akhil
- Asghar Ali
- Bellipadi Chandrahasa Alva
- A. Ananthanarayanan
- K. N. Ananthapadmanabhan
- Anirudh Singh
- K. P. Appanna
- Baba Aparajith
- Sreenath Aravind
- Bharat Arun
- Jagadeesh Arunkumar
- P. R. Ashokanand
- Ravichandran Ashwin
- Swapnil Asnodkar
- Arshad Ayub
- Abdul Azeem
- Mohammad Azharuddin
- Sachin Baby
- Hemang Badani
- Devdutt Padikkal
- Subramaniam Badrinath
- Abbas Ali Baig
- Lakshmipathy Balaji
- Saurabh Bandekar
- P. K. Belliappa
- Vijay Bharadwaj
- C. K. Bhaskaran
- Raghuram Bhat
- Roger Binny
- Stuart Binny
- D. L. Chakravarti
- V. Chamundeswaranath
- B. S. Chandrasekhar
- V. B. Chandrasekhar
- Raghunath Chinnadorai
- Bharat Chipli
- Michael Dalvi
- Noel David
- D. B. Deodhar
- Sanjay Desai
- Dinshaw Doctor
- Rahul Dravid
- Benjamin Frank

== G–L ==
- C. Ganapathy
- Dodda Ganesh
- C. M. Gautam
- Narayanan Gautam
- Mohammed Ghazali
- Jugal Kishore Ghiya
- Roy Gilchrist
- D. J. Gokulakrishnan
- Shreyas Gopal
- M. J. Gopalan
- C. D. Gopinath
- Devraj Govindraj
- Rajaram Gurav
- Ali Hussain
- Zakir Hussain
- Asif Iqbal
- Abdul Jabbar
- Arati Jagannath
- M. L. Jaisimha
- Vivek Jaisimha
- Shadab Jakati
- Govindamenon Jayakumar
- Kenia Jayantilal
- Arani Jayaprakash
- Kartik Jeshwant
- Rajamani Jesuraj
- David Johnson
- Conrad Johnstone
- Sunil Joshi
- Saad Bin Jung
- P. Jyothiprasad
- Doddapaneni Kalyankrishna
- Kommireddi Kamaraju
- Dayanand Kamath
- Narayan Kambli
- K. S. Kannan
- N. Kannayiram
- Kanwaljit Singh
- Aashish Kapoor
- Arun Karthik
- Dinesh Karthik
- Gopalaswamy Kasturirangan
- Jagannathan Kaushik
- Kamraj Kesari
- Ibrahim Khaleel
- Habib Khan
- Mansur Ali Khan
- Nizam Yar Khan
- Waheed Yar Khan
- Bharat Khanna
- Ranjit Khanwilkar
- Syed Kirmani
- Nand Kishore
- A. G. Kripal Singh
- Trichy Krishna
- Pochiah Krishnamurthy
- Ajjampur Krishnaswamy
- V. Krishnaswamy
- Ajay Kudua
- Arvind Kumar
- Bharath Kumar
- Mahendra Kumar
- Sarvesh Kumar
- Mani Suresh Kumar
- Vaman Kumar
- Vinay Kumar
- Thiru Kumaran
- Anil Kumble
- Budhi Kunderan
- V. V. S. Laxman

== M–R ==
- Jayaraman Madanagopal
- Rangachari Madhavan
- Nekkanti Madhukar
- Sadagoppan Mahesh
- Yo Mahesh
- S. V. S. Mani
- Daniel Manohar
- Dinesh Medh
- Daitala Meherbaba
- Naushir Mehta
- A. G. Milkha Singh
- Darshan Misal
- Abhimanyu Mithun
- Vijay Mohanraj
- Ronit More
- Abhinav Mukund
- P. Mukund
- M. K. Murugesh
- Gopi Naidu
- Thilak Naidu
- Korra Naik
- Karun Nair
- Sreekumar Nair
- Narender Pal Singh
- Salus Nazareth
- Sunil Oasis
- Pragyan Ojha
- Phiroze Palia
- Manish Pandey
- Balan Pandit
- Prasanth Parameswaran
- Mansur Ali Khan Pataudi
- Brijesh Patel
- Yogendra Patel
- Amit Pathak
- Reuben Paul
- Vijay Paul
- K. B. Pawan
- Namdev Phadte
- Kiran Powar
- P. C. Prakash
- M. S. K. Prasad
- Venkatesh Prasad
- Chandramouli Prasad
- E. A. S. Prasanna
- Ramaswamy Prasanna
- Vanka Pratap
- Rohan Prem
- Khalid Qayyum
- Chandrashekhar Raghu
- K. L. Rahul
- Mohan Rai
- K. R. Rajagopal
- Venkatapathy Raju
- Woorkeri Raman
- C. J. Ramdev
- P. Ramesh
- Sadagoppan Ramesh
- Hanumara Ramkishen
- Ramakrishnan Ramkumar
- Venkatraman Ramnarayan
- B. Ramprakash
- Hanumara Ramprasad
- A. G. Ram Singh
- C. R. Rangachari
- Srinivas Rangaraj
- Malolan Rangarajan
- Balaji Rao
- Hejmadi Bhaskar Rao
- M. V. Narasimha Rao
- U. Prabhakar Rao
- Rama Rao
- Sanjiva Rao
- Sharad Rao
- Sudhakar Rao
- Venkatesh Rao
- Yalaka Venugopal Rao
- Yaleeka Gnaneswara Rao
- Mirza Ravikumar
- Dwaraka Ravi Teja
- Ambati Rayudu
- Vivek Razdan
- Akshath Reddy
- Ashish Reddy
- Bharath Reddy
- Inder Shekar Reddy
- Kaushik Reddy
- Prasad Reddy
- Madhusudan Rege
- Robin Singh
- Barrington Rowland

== S–Z ==
- Syed Sahabuddin
- Manoj Sai
- K. Sainath
- Carlton Saldanha
- Sanju Samson
- Wasuderao Sane
- A. K. Sarangapani
- Ganesh Satish
- A. G. Satwender Singh
- T. A. Sekhar
- M. Senthilnathan
- HS Sharath
- Sridharan Sharath
- Sadu Shinde
- Mumbai Shrinivas
- Poll Shyamsunder
- Laxman Sivaramakrishnan
- Venkataraman Sivaramakrishnan
- Vidyut Sivaramakrishnan
- Ranga Sohoni
- Shiraguppi Somasekhar
- Sujith Somasunder
- S. Sreesanth
- M. V. Sridhar
- Ramakrishnan Sridhar
- Anirudha Srikkanth
- Kris Srikkanth
- Javagal Srinath
- Krishnaraj Srinath
- Aushik Srinivas
- Krishnaswami Srinivasan
- M. O. Srinivasan
- Muthuswami Srinivasan
- T. E. Srinivasan
- M. R. Srinivasaprasad
- Sridharan Sriram
- CV Stephen
- Linganath Subbu
- Sunil Subramaniam
- Venkataraman Subramanya
- Bodavarapu Sudhakar
- Bodapati Sumanth
- Maripuri Suresh
- Somasetty Suresh
- C. S. Sureshkumar
- M. Suryanarayan
- Narain Swamy
- R. A. Swaroop
- T. Thimmiah
- Gordon Upjohn
- Robin Uthappa
- Avinash Vaidya
- Sunil Valson
- Ajay Varma
- Diwakar Vasu
- S. Vasudevan
- S. Venkataraghavan
- M. Venkataramana
- Amit Verma
- Hanuma Vihari
- Murali Vijay
- B. Vijayakrishna
- Paidikalva Vijaykumar
- V. S. Vijay Kumar
- Devishetty Vinay Kumar
- Sankinani Vishnuvardhan
- Gundappa Viswanath
- Kadur Viswanath
- Puttanna Viswanath
- Sadanand Viswanath
- Sandeep Warrier
- Hemal Watekar
- Arjun Yadav
- Rajesh Yadav
- Shivlal Yadav
- Tinu Yohannan
- Youraj Singh
