= List of Hyderabad cricketers =

This is a list of all cricketers who have played first-class, List A or Twenty20 cricket for Hyderabad cricket team. Seasons given are first and last seasons; the player did not necessarily play in all the intervening seasons. Players in bold have played international cricket.

Last updated at the end of the 2019/20 season.

== A ==
- Ali Abbas, 1939/40-1950/51
- Mohammad Abdul Hai, 1968/69-1975/76
- Abdullah, 1956/57
- **Syed Abid Ali**, 1959/60-1978/79
- Akhil P Mohan, 1998/99
- Alfred Absolem, 2005/06-2013/14
- VH Achar, 1998/99
- Himalay Agarwal, 2014/15-2019/20
- Tanmay Agarwal, 2014/15-2019/20
- Abrar Ahmed, 1990/91-1991/92
- Anwar Ahmed, 2011/12-2015/16
- Faiz Ahmed, 1999/00-2003/04
- **Ghulam Ahmed**, 1939/40-1958/59
- Habeeb Ahmed, 2007/08-2016/17
- Habib Ahmed, 1955/56-1967/68
- Jamil Ahmed, 1930/31
- Mushtaq Ahmed, 1963/64-1964/65
- Shaik Ahmed, 1991/92
- Shoaib Ahmed, 2007/08-2010/11
- Ushaq Ahmed, 1934/35-1946/47
- Edulji Aibara, 1934/35-1958/59
- Faridoon Aibara, 1954/55-1957/58
- Annabathula Akash, 2015/16-2016/17
- Shahid Akbar, 1976/77-1983/84
- Afzal Ali, 1954/55-1956/57
- Amir Ali, 1957/58-1960/61
- Asghar Ali, 1942/43-1948/49
- Azmath Ali, 1979/80-1981/82
- Hamid Ali, 1954/55
- Hyder Ali, 1931/32-1941/42
- Jaweed Ali, 2015/16-2019/20
- Miraj Ali, 1931/32-1936/37
- Gangam Anikethreddy, 2019/20
- Balchander Anirudh, 2014/15-2016/17
- Jaggulal Anshul, 2014/15
- Dayanand Archaye, 1936/37
- Mungala Arjun, 2005/06-2012/13
- Dharmapuri Arvind, 1995/96
- Gangashetty Arvind Kumar, 1994/95-2003/04
- P. R. Ashokanand, 1957/58
- Rashid Ashraf, 1990/91-1995/96
- **Arshad Ayub**, 1979/80-1993/94
- Abdul Azeem, 1979/80-1994/95
- **Mohammad Azharuddin**, 1981/82-1999/00
- [Mohammed Abdul Rehman],1994/95/96

== B ==
- **Subramaniam Badrinath**, 2016/17
- **Abbas Ali Baig**, 1954/55-1975/76
- Faiz Baig, 1980/81-1983/84
- Mazhar Ali Baig, 1963/64-1966/67
- Murtuza Ali Baig, 1958/59-1970/71
- Rehmat Baig, 1969/70
- Abdul Baseer, 2009/10-2010/11
- Bashiruddin, 1930/31-1931/32
- Akash Bhandari, 2009/10-2019/20
- AR Bhupathi, 1940/41-1954/55
- Neeraj Bist, 2009/10-2011/12
- M. V. Bobjee, 1950/51-1953/54
- Rahul Buddhi, 2019/20
- Ernest Burdett, 1932/33

== C ==
- Katikaneni Chakravarthy, 1994/95
- KSK Chaitanya, 2018/19
- CR Chandran, 1975/76-1977/78
- A. Chatterjee, 1984/85
- Vivian Chiodetti, 1931/32

== D ==
- **Noel David**, 1992/93-2001/02
- Deshmukh, 1930/31
- Dhansukh, 1935/36
- G Dinesh Kumar, 1993/94
- Feredune Dittia, 1940/41-1949/50
- Minoo Dittia, 1946/47-1953/54
- SF Driver, 1932/33

== E ==
- Lyn Edwards, 1969/70

== F ==
- Fazluddin, 1952/53-1954/55

== G ==
- Mohammad Ghouse Baba, 2000/01-2004/05
- **Roy Gilchrist**, 1962/63 (played international cricket for West Indies)
- Govindaswami, 1930/31-1932/33
- Ajay Dev Goud, 2018/19-2019/20
- Vijay Goud, 2008/09
- Devraj Govindraj, 1964/65-1974/75

== H ==
- Syed Mohammad Hadi, 1930/31-1940/41
- Nagesh Hammond, 1969/70-1976/77
- Riazul Haq, 1930/31-1938/39
- A I Harrsha, 2014/15
- P Hari Mohan, 1985/86-1986/87
- Hari Prasad Kovelamudi, 1981/82-1983/84
- Mehdi Hasan, 2011/12-2019/20
- S Himayatullah, 1930/31-1934/35
- Hisamuddin, 1945/46-1946/47
- Ahmed Hussain, 1931/32
- Ali Hussain, 1943/44-1953/54
- Mohammad Hussain, 1930/31-1942/43
- Mumtaz Hussain, 1967/68-1977/78
- Sabir Hussain, 1962/63
- Tafazzul Hussain, 1932/33
- Zakir Hussain, 1988/89-1991/92

== I ==
- Iftikharuddin, 1961/62-1964/65
- **Asif Iqbal**, 1959/60-1960/61 (played international cricket for Pakistan)

== J ==
- Chelluri Jaikumar, 1989/90-1991/92
- M. Jairam, 1954/55-1965/66
- **M. L. Jaisimha**, 1954/55-1976/77
- Vivek Jaisimha, 1982/83-1993/94
- **Kenia Jayantilal**, 1968/69-1978/79
- Parth Jhala, 2012/13
- Ronald Joy, 1931/32
- Saad Bin Jung, 1978/79-1980/81
- P Jyothiprasad, 1974/75-1984/85

== K ==
- Karthikeya Kak, 2018/19
- Kaleem-ul-Haq, 1962/63-1968/69
- Kanakasabhapathi, 1941/42
- Mohammed Khader, 2007/08-2013/14
- **Ibrahim Khaleel**, 2002/03-2014/15 (played international cricket for United States of America)
- Khalil-ur-Rehman, 1959/60
- Abbas Ali Khan, 1992/93
- Ehteshamuddin Ali Khan, 1984/85-1991/92
- Fateh Khan, 1930/31
- Fazal Ahmed Khan, 1931/32
- Habib Khan, 1956/57-1968/69
- Ibrahim Khan, 1935/36-1954/55
- Isa Khan, 1934/35-1940/41
- Mohammad Ali Khan, 1949/50
- Nasir Ali Khan, 1949/50-1951/52
- Nizam Yar Khan, 1947/48-1950/51
- Salamat Ali Khan, 1988/89
- Sardar Khan, 1970/71-1981/82
- Waheed Yar Khan, 1960/61-1968/69
- Zahid Ali Khan, 1970/71
- Bharat Khanna, 1932/33-1952/53
- Ravi Kiran, 2011/12-2019/20
- Sangani Kiran Kumar, 1995/96-1996/97
- Nand Kishore, 1994/95-2004/05
- Vivek Krishna, 2009/10-2010/11
- S. Krishnamurthi, 1951/52
- BN Krishnamurthy, 1955/56-1961/62
- Pochiah Krishnamurthy, 1967/68-1978/79
- Abhinav Kumar, 2004/05-2012/13
- Mahendra Kumar, 1960/61-1966/67
- Pawan Kumar, 1984/85
- Pawan Kumar, 1997/98-2001/02
- Pawan Kumar, 1995/96
- Praneeth Kumar, 2012/13-2014/15
- Sarvesh Kumar, 2007/08-2009/10

== L ==
- Jagdish Lal, 1944/45
- G Laxman, 1966/67
- **V. V. S. Laxman**, 1992/93-2012/13
- Zahid Lodhi, 1938/39
- Sinderraj Lokenderraj, 1961/62

== M ==
- VG Mache, 1936/37-1938/39
- A. Majid Khan, 1960/92
- Jamalpur Mallikarjun, 2018/19-2019/20
- Daniel Manohar, 1997/98-2007/08
- V Manohar, 1984/85-1987/88
- SM Mazhar, 1948/49
- Syed Meeraj, 1993/94-1997/98
- Danthala Venkata Meher Baba, 1978/79
- Marzban Mehta, 1952/53
- Naushir Mehta, 1967/68-1976/77
- Sorabji Mehta, 1936/37-1946/47
- Chama Milind, 2012/13-2019/20
- F Mistry, 1943/44
- **Gul Mohammad**, 1951/52-1954/55 (played international cricket for India and Pakistan)
- Bhupait Mohan, 1970/71
- Lalit Mohan, 1959/60-1963/64
- Lalith Mohan, 2007/08-2015/16
- Vijay Mohanraj, 1979/80-1994/95
- Mohammad Mohiuddin, 1994/95-1998/99
- Mohammad Muddassir, 2016/17-2018/19
- **V. M. Muddiah**, 1953/54
- Sharadh Mudiraj, 2016/17
- Venkat Murthy, 1984/85
- Muralidharan, 1953/54
- B Muthukrishna, 1977/78

== N ==
- Mohammad Nadeemuddin, 2002/03-2004/05
- Khaja Naeemuddin, 1969/70
- Shashank Nag, 2003/04-2010/11
- Pagadala Naidu, 2009/10-2015/16
- K Naik, 1938/39
- **M. V. Narasimha Rao**, 1971/72-1988/89
- Nasiruddin, 1951/52-1955/56
- Mehboob Nausheer, 1956/57-1958/59
- V Navinatham, 1951/52-1953/54
- **C. K. Nayudu**, 1931/32
- Shatish Nellury, 1994/95
- Pagadala Niranjan, 2004/05-2009/10
- Moses Nityanand, 1980/81

== O ==
- **Pragyan Ojha**, 2004/05-2017/18

== P ==
- Komadur Padmanabhan, 1957/58-1960/61
- Anoop Pai, 2005/06-2010/11
- **Mansoor Ali Khan Pataudi**, 1965/66-1975/76
- Babubhai Patel, 1939/40-1940/41
- Krishnakant Patel, 1951/52-1954/55
- Arun Paul, 1983/84-1988/89
- Vijay Paul, 1974/75-1982/83
- Sunil Phillips, 1984/85
- N Prahalad, 1970/71-1974/75
- Durga Prasad, 1944/45-1950/51
- Vanka Pratap, 1991/92-2001/02
- N Premkumar, 1962/63-1971/72
- Danny Dereck Prince, 2007/08-2016/17

== Q ==
- Khlid Qayyum, 1976/77-1989/90
- Syed Quadri, 2002/03-2015/16
- Abdul Ela Qureshi, 2018/19
- Asadullah Qureshi, 1935/36-1948/49
- Ghulam Qureshi, 1936/37-1954/55
- Qutubuddin, 1942/43

== R ==
- Arif Rabbani, 1949/50-1957/58
- Ahmed Rafiuddin, 1957/58-1958/59
- S Rahim, 1947/48
- Doddapaneni Rushi Raj, 2006/07-2009/10
- Sundeep Rajan, 2011/12-2013/14
- Alladi Raju, 1977/78-1979/80
- Prabhakar Raju, 1965/66-1966/67
- **Venkatapathy Raju**, 1985/86-2004/05
- K Ramakrishna, 1949/50-1960/61
- M. V. Ramanamurthy, 1986/87-1993/94
- Kartik Ramaswamy, 1998/99
- Pottimuthyala Ramesh Kumar, 1989/90-1992/93
- Venkatraman Ramnarayan, 1975/76-1979/80
- Pondicharry Rangaraj, 1989/90
- Bhagya Rao, 1950/51
- Ganesh Rao, 1932/33
- Padma Rao, 1952/53
- RK Rao, 1930/31-1942/43
- Sanjiva Rao, 1942/43-1957/58
- Tata Rao, 1934/35
- Venkatesh Rao, 1955/56-1966/67
- A Raoof, 1946/47-1947/48
- Timothy Ravi Kumar, 1997/98
- Dwaraka Ravi Teja, 2005/06-2014/15
- **Ambati Rayudu**, 2001/02-2019/20
- Rohit Rayudu, 2016/17-2019/20
- Akshath Reddy, 2009/10-2019/20
- Ashish Reddy, 2008/09-2018/19
- Chaitanya Reddy, 2017/18-2019/20
- Dillip Reddy, 1979/80
- Fathima Reddy, 1999/00
- Gajanan Reddy, 1992/93
- Gautham Reddy, 2008/09
- Inder Shekar Reddy, 2001/02-2010/11
- Kaushik Reddy, 2004/05-2006/07
- Naveen Reddy, 2006/07
- Papi Reddy, 1993/94-1995/96
- Prateek Reddy, 2019/20
- Santosh Reddy, 1966/67-1970/71
- Shashidhar Reddy, 2019/20
- Yathin Reddy, 2015/16-2016/17
- Shaikh Riazuddin, 1993/94-1999/00
- Maurice Robinson, 1943/44
- Ronald Rodrigues, 2007/08-2008/09

== S ==
- Rohit Sabharwal, 2001/02-2006/07
- RH Sabir, 1964/65
- K Sainath, 1978/79-1982/83
- Palakodeti Sairam, 2013/14-2019/20
- Sultan Saleem, 1964/65-1975/76
- Khan Samiullah, 2008/09
- Bavanaka Sandeep, 2010/11-2019/20
- Parth Satwalkar, 1999/00-2000/01
- RV Seshadri, 1954/55
- Shahabuddin, 1931/32
- Fahad Shahnawaz, 2004/05
- Mohammed Shakeer, 2006/07-2008/09
- Shiv Shanker, 2008/09
- Vishal Sharma, 2007/08-2016/17
- Jyothi Shetty, 1987/88-1988/89
- Amol Shinde, 2005/06-2017/18
- K Shivaraj, 1958/59-1959/60
- Poll Shyamsunder, 1957/58
- **Iqbal Siddiqui**, 1995/96
- Anirudh Singh, 2000/01-2010/11
- Kanwaljit Singh, 1980/81-2000/01
- **A. G. Kripal Singh**, 1965/66
- Maheshwar Singh, 1972/73-1977/78
- PR Man Singh, 1965/66
- Narender Pal Singh, 1993/94-2006/07
- Paramveer Singh, 2007/08-2012/13
- Rahul Singh, 2012/13-2013/14
- Rajkumar Singh, 1948/49
- Yudhvir Singh, 2019/20
- Youraj Singh, 1992/93-1999/00
- **Mohammed Siraj**, 2015/16-2019/20
- C Sridhar, 1982/83-1984/85
- M. V. Sridhar, 1988/89-1999/00
- Ramakrishnan Sridhar, 1989/90-2000/01
- G. Srinivas, 1997/98
- Mangalapally Srinivas, 1996/97-2001/02
- G Srinivasan, 1992/93
- M. S. Sriram, 1954/55-1961/62
- Tirumalasetti Suman, 2002/03-2015/16
- Kolla Sumanth, 2012/13-2019/20
- D Suresh, 1986/87-1988/89
- Gevin Surma, 1987/88
- R. A. Swaroop, 1987/88-1994/95

== T ==
- Ravi Teja, 2016/17-2019/20
- Tanay Thyagarajan, 2016/17-2019/20
- Benjamin Thomas, 2009/10-2016/17
- F Toorkey, 1934/35-1938/39
- **Sudeep Tyagi**, 2015/16-2017/18

== V ==
- Vajubha, 1936/37-1941/42
- Harsha Vardhan, 2014/15
- Tilak Varma, 2018/19-2019/20
- L Vasan, 1977/78-1980/81
- Venkataswami, 1934/35-1943/44
- P Venugopal, 1996/97
- **Hanuma Vihari**, 2009/10-2015/16
- Vijay Kumar, 2000/01
- Devishetty Vinay Kumar, 1996/97-2006/07
- Sankinani Vishnuvardhan, 1994/95-2004/05

== W ==
- Abdul Wahab, 1976/77-1982/83
- Wahiduddin, 1947/48
- John Wilson, 1930/31

== Y ==
- Ashwin Yadav, 2007/08-2010/11
- Arjun Yadav, 1999/00-2012/13
- Rajesh Yadav, 1984/85-1993/94
- Santosh Yadav, 1995/96-2007/08
- Shivaji Yadav, 1994/95-2004/05
- **Shivlal Yadav**, 1977/78-1989/90
- Mohammad Yusuf, 1950/51

== Z ==
- Bobby Zahiruddin, 1938/39-1944/45
