= List of Andhra Pradesh cricketers =

This is a list of cricketers who have played cricket for the Andhra cricket team.

== A ==
- Bandaru Ayyappa (born 1992)
- Shaik Basha (born 1993)
- K. S. Bharat (born 1993)
- Ricky Bhui (born 1996)

== C ==
- Dasari Chaitanya (born 1997)
- V. Chamundeswaranath (born 1959)
- Gonnabattula Chiranjeevi (born 1992)

== H ==
- Kakani Harish (born 1991)
- Ashwin Hebbar (born 1995)

== J ==
- M. Jairam (born 1937)

== K ==
- Mohammad Kaif (born 1980)
- Doddapaneni Kalyankrishna
- S. K. Kamaruddin (born 1992)
- Shoaib Md Khan (born 1991)
- Dasi Prabhu Kiran (born 1989)
- Sneha Kishore (born 1993)
- Jyothi Krishna (born 1990)
- Ajay Kumar (born 1989)
- Dasari Swaroop Kumar (born 1986)
- Mahendra Kumar (born 1939)
- Pawan Kumar (born 1970)
- Prasanth Kumar (born 1991)
- Siva Kumar (born 1990)
- Timmeri Kumar (born 1992)

== M ==
- Vijay Manjrekar (1931–1983)
- Amol Muzumdar (born 1974)
- Danthala Venkata Meher Baba (1950–2008)

== N ==
- C. K. Nayudu (died 1967)
- C. S. Nayudu
- Nitish Kumar Reddy (born 2003)

== P ==
- Komadur Padmanabhan (born 1937)
- Amit Pathak (born 1972)
- Rajesh Pawar (born 1979)
- A. G. Pradeep (born 1987)
- L. N. Prasad Reddy (born 1977)
- Mudi Prajith (born 1989)
- M. S. K. Prasad (born 1975)
- G. A. Parvatisha naidu (born 1956)

== R ==
- Prithvi Raj (born 1998)
- Karthik Raman (born 1997)
- Bajina Ramprasad (1940–2016)
- Balaji Rao (born 1938)
- Bhavaraju Venkata Krishna Rao (born 1930)
- Gnaneswara Rao (born 1984)
- Mandapati Subba Rao
- Narayana Rao (born 1940)
- Yalaka Venugopal Rao (born 1982)
- Ambati Rayudu (born 1985)
- Girinath Reddy (born 1998)

== S ==
- Manoj Sai (born 1982)
- K. V. Sasikanth (born 1995)
- Syed Shahabuddin (born 1979)
- Karan Shinde (born 1997)
- Hanumappa Shivraj (born 1990)
- Bukkapatnam Siddharth (born 1990)
- Maheshwar Singh (born 1946)
- Siva Charan Singh (born 1993)
- Koripalli Sreekanth (born 1992)
- Sirla Srinivas (born 1992)
- Murumulla Sriram (born 1992)
- CV Stephen (born 1993)
- Bodavarapu Sudhakar (born 1991)
- Tirumalasetti Suman (born 1983)
- Bodapati Sumanth (born 1988)
- Marripuri Suresh (born 1983)
- Gorrela Shankara Rao (born 1984)

== V ==
- Paidikalva Vijaykumar (born 1986)
- T Vamsikrishna
- Venkatapathy Raju
- Aatla Vinay Kumar Reddy
- Tilak Verma
