= 1990–91 Ranji Trophy =

1990-91 Ranji Trophy
- The Ranji Trophy, which the winners get.
- Administrator: BCCI
- Cricket format: First-class cricket
- Tournament format(s): League and knockout
- Champions: Haryana (1st title)
- Participants: 27
- Most runs: Amarjit Kaypee (Haryana) (940)
- Most wickets: Chetan Sharma (Haryana) (39)

The 1990–91 Ranji Trophy was the 57th season of the Ranji Trophy cricket tournament. Haryana defeated Bombay by 2 runs in the closest Ranji final in history.

== Group stage ==
=== North Zone ===
Team	Pld	W	L	D	T	NR	Pts	RR
Delhi	5	3	0	2	0	0	92	3.460
Haryana	5	3	0	2	0	0	87	2.951
Punjab	5	3	1	1	0	0	81	3.160
Himachal Pradesh	5	1	3	1	0	0	40	2.842
Services	5	1	4	0	0	0	36	2.930
Jammu and Kashmir	5	0	3	2	0	0	29	2.785

=== Central Zone ===
Team	Pld	W	L	D	T	NR	Pts	RR
Madhya Pradesh	4	2	0	2	0	0	60	2.882
Uttar Pradesh	4	1	0	3	0	0	50	2.979
Railways	4	1	1	2	0	0	46	3.037
Rajasthan	4	1	1	2	0	0	39	2.490
Vidarbha	4	0	3	1	0	0	28	2.999

=== East Zone ===
Team	Pld	W	L	D	T	NR	Pts	RR
Bengal	4	2	0	2	0	0	79	3.945
Bihar	4	1	0	3	0	0	56	2.644
Assam	4	1	0	3	0	0	55	3.265
Orissa	4	1	1	2	0	0	42	3.013
Tripura	4	0	4	0	0	0	16	2.562

=== South Zone ===
Team	Pld	W	L	D	T	NR	Pts	RR
Hyderabad	5	3	1	1	0	0	85	3.483
Karnataka	5	3	0	2	0	0	77	3.160
Tamil Nadu	5	2	0	3	0	0	58	3.329
Kerala	5	2	3	0	0	0	46	3.068
Goa	5	0	2	3	0	0	29	2.501
Andhra	5	0	4	1	0	0	25	3.053

=== West Zone ===
Team	Pld	W	L	D	T	NR	Pts	RR
Maharashtra	4	0	0	4	0	0	64	3.850
Bombay	4	1	0	3	0	0	58	3.824
Baroda	4	1	0	3	0	0	56	3.402
Saurashtra	4	0	1	3	0	0	37	3.274
Gujarat	4	0	1	3	0	0	33	3.297

== Knockout stage ==
Pre-Quarter-finals
2 Feb 1991 — Indore
Madhya Pradesh	377 & 165
Bombay	493 & 50/0
2 Feb 1991 — Pune
Maharashtra	311 & 268/2
Karnataka (F)	638 & 307/2d

Quarter-finals
16 Apr 1991 — Delhi
Delhi	389 & 371/4
Bombay (F)	390 & 719/8d
16 Apr 1991 — Ranchi
Bihar	203
Hyderabad (F)	298/6
16 Apr 1991 — Calcutta
Bengal (R)	652/9
Karnataka	791/6d
16 Apr 1991 — Faridabad
Haryana (F)	339 & 429/9d
Uttar Pradesh	295 & 221/7

Semi-finals
24 Apr 1991 — Bombay
Bombay (F)	855/6d & 446/4d
Hyderabad	498 & 36/0
24 Apr 1991 — Calcutta
Bengal	440
Haryana (F)	605 & 274/5

Finals
3 May 1991 — Bombay
Bombay	410 & 352
Haryana	522 & 242

(F) - Advanced to next round on First Innings Lead.
(R) - Advanced to next round on better Run Rate.

=== Semi-finals ===
Bombay got off to a poor start after electing to bat on the opening day of the first semi-final. They lost both openers to Rajesh Yadav and were reduced to 30/2. Captain Sanjay Manjrekar, joined by Dilip Vengsarkar, added 283 runs for the third wicket. Despite not being in good touch, the latter made 121. With his relentless batting for a total of five sessions (666 minutes) filled with fine strokeplay, Manjrekar made 377, the second highest individual score in the history of the Ranji trophy. He put on 118 and 268 runs with hard-hitting Sachin Tendulkar (70) and Vinod Kambli (126) for the fourth and fifth wickets, taking the team to 807/6 at the end of day two. However, 48 penalty runs against Hyderabad meant Bombay's score stood at 855/6, then the second highest innings total in Ranji Trophy history. Hyderabad's reply with the bat began with the loss of opener Chelluri Jaikumar in the first over. R. A. Swaroop (123) and M. V. Sridhar then put together 285 runs, breaking Hyderabad's record for the best second-wicket partnership. The new ball before end of day's play brought Bombay the wickets of Swaroop and M. V. Ramanamurthy. Swaroop playing attacking cricket early in the day hitting eleven boundaries to reach his half-century. From being 255/3 overnight, Hyderabad were dismissed after tea, handing their opponents a 357-run lead. The only notable partnerships were those of Sridhar (184) with Vivek Jaisimha and Venkatapathy Raju that yielded respectively 111 and 94 runs. Virtually through to the final on account of first innings lead and only a day of play left, the Bombay batsmen once again displayed "ruthless... arrogance" in their second innings. Both openers made half-centuries, and Kambli made a century (127 off 114 balls), becoming the fourth Bombay batsman to score a century in both innings of a Ranji Trophy match. Tendulkar batted in similar fashion, making 88 off 66 deliveries, an innings that included five sixes and eight fours. Chandrakant Pandit also made an unbeaten century. Bombay declared at 446/4 after tea, with their opponents making 36 runs without losing a wicket, before proceedings were halted with ten of the stipulated overs in the last hour uncompleted.

In the second semi-final, Bengal's decision to field after winning the toss on a batting wicket at the Eden Gardens, Kolkata, backfired after Haryana put on 305 on day one. Captain Kapil Dev arrived when his team were at 186/4, and took his team to end of play without further loss of wickets. Day two saw three of Haryana's batsmen making centuries — Dev (141), Ajay Banerjee (111) and Vijay Yadav (106) — helping their team go past their highest ever innings total of 583. In reply to Haryana's total of 605, Bengal began strongly reaching 124 without losing a wicket before Dev picked two wickets in an over, reducing them to 128/2. Arun Lal reached his 17th Ranji century, before Dev dismissed him for 136 with a rising delivery that took his edge. Sourav Ganguly's controversial dismissal led to stoppage of play for 20 minutes due to crowd trouble. Dev claimed Haryana's final two wickets helping his team gain a 165-run first innings lead on the final day. Haryana's second innings saw Amarjit Kaypee making his fifth century of the season while Ajay Jadeja made 85. The match ended in a draw with Haryana progressing to their second Ranji final, on first innings lead.

24–28 April 1991
Scorecard

Bombay	v	Hyderabad
855/6d (176 overs); Sanjay Manjrekar 377 (473); Rajesh Yadav 3/111 (25 overs)		498 (160.5 overs); M. V. Sridhar 184; Sanjay Patil 4/71 (42.5 overs)
446/4d (86.2 overs); Vinod Kambli 127 (114); Arshad Ayub 2/127 (30 overs)		36/0 (7 overs); Chelluri Jaikumar 15*

Match drawn
Wankhede Stadium, Mumbai
Umpires: Jiban Ghosh and S. K. Bansal

- Bombay won the toss and elected to bat.
- Yogendra Bhandari (Haryana) made his first-class debut.

24–28 April 1991
Scorecard

Haryana	v	Bengal
605 (184.1 overs); Kapil Dev 141; Joydeep Mukherjee 4/100 (32.1 overs)		440 (191.1 overs); Arun Lal 136; Kapil Dev 5/85 (40.1 overs)
274/5 (47 overs); Amarjit Kaypee 102; Sagarmoy Sensharma 4/74 (18 overs)

Match drawn
Eden Gardens, Kolkata
Umpires: B. Jamula and T. A. Sreedhar

- Bengal won the toss and elected to field.

=== Final ===
3–7 May 1991
Scorecard

Haryana	v	Bombay (H)
522 (162.3 overs); Deepak Sharma 199; Abey Kuruvilla 4/128 (31 overs)		410 (137.3 overs); Sanjay Patil 85; Yogendra Bhandari 5/118 (31.3 overs)
242 (87.4 overs); Ajay Banerjee 60; Salil Ankola 3/39 (13.4 overs)		352 (65.4 overs); Dilip Vengsarkar 139* (137); Chetan Sharma 2/59 (16.4 overs)

Haryana won by 2 runs
Wankhede Stadium, Bombay
Umpires: A. L. Narasimhan and R. V. Ramani

- Haryana won the toss and decided to bat

== Scorecards and averages ==
- CricketArchive
