= 2016–17 Vijay Hazare Trophy Group C =

- Dates: 25 February 2017 – 6 March 2017
- Administrator(s): BCCI
- Cricket format: List A cricket
- Tournament format(s): Round-robin and Playoff format
- Host(s): Chennai
- Participants: 7
- Matches: 21
- Official website: Official website

2016–17 Vijay Hazare Trophy is the 15th season of the Vijay Hazare Trophy, a List A cricket tournament in India. It will be contested by 28 domestic cricket teams of India.

== Points table ==
Pos	Team	Pld	W	L	T	NR	Pts	NRR	Qualification
1	Bengal	6	5	1	0	0	20	0.293	Knockout Stage
2	Gujarat	6	4	2	0	0	16	0.969	Knockout Stage
3	Mumbai	6	4	2	0	0	16	0.732	
4	Madhya Pradesh	6	3	3	0	0	12	0.283	
5	Andhra	6	3	3	0	0	12	−0.445	
6	Rajasthan	6	2	4	0	0	8	−0.325	
7	Goa	6	0	6	0	0	0	−1.917	

== Fixtures ==
=== Round 1 ===
25 Feb 2017
09:00 IST
Scorecard

Andhra	v	Bengal

Bengal won by 4 wickets

- Dasari Chaitanya (Andhra) and Ishan Porel (Bengal) both made their List A debuts.

25 Feb 2017
09:00 IST
Scorecard

Gujarat	v	Mumbai

Mumbai won by 98 runs

- Chirag Parmar, Het Patel (Gujarat); Aditya Dhumal, Shivam Malhotra, Prithvi Shaw and Pravin Tambe (Mumbai) all made their List A debuts.

25 Feb 2017
09:00 IST
Scorecard

Madhya Pradesh	v	Rajasthan

Madhya Pradesh won by 3 wickets

- Saransh Jain, Mukul Raghav (Madhya Pradesh); Ashok Bhudania, Rahul Chahar and Mahipal Lomror (Rajasthan) all made their List A debuts.

=== Round 2 ===
26 February 2017
Scorecard

Andhra	v	Madhya Pradesh

Andhra won by 2 wickets

26 February 2017
Scorecard

Goa	v	Gujarat

Gujarat won by 78 runs

- Sumiran Amonkar, Snehal Kauthankar and Malik Shirur (Goa) all made their List A debuts.

26 February 2017
Scorecard

Mumbai	v	Rajasthan

Mumbai won by 5 wickets

- Shivam Dube (Mumbai), Kamlesh Nagarkoti and Tajinder Singh (Rajasthan) all made their List A debuts.

=== Round 3 ===
28 February 2017
Scorecard

Bengal	v	Goa

- Kanishk Seth (Bengal), Felix Alemao, Amulaya Pandrekar and Suyash Prabhudessai (Goa) all made their List A debuts.

28 February 2017
Scorecard

Gujarat	v	Rajasthan

- Samit Gohel (Gujarat) made his List A debut.

28 February 2017
Scorecard

Madhya Pradesh	v	Mumbai

- Ankit Dane (Madhya Pradesh) made his List A debut.

=== Round 4 ===
1 March 2017
Scorecard

Andhra	v	Goa

1 March 2017
Scorecard

Bengal	v	Rajasthan

- Pramod Chandila (Bengal) made his List A debut.

1 March 2017
Scorecard

Gujarat	v	Madhya Pradesh

- Chintan Gaja (Gujarat) made his List A debut.

=== Round 5 ===
3 March 2017
Scorecard

Andhra	v	Gujarat

- Siva Charan Singh (Andhra) made his List A debut.

3 March 2017
Scorecard

Bengal	v	Mumbai

- Vinayak Bhoir (Mumbai) made his List A debut.

3 March 2017
Scorecard

Goa	v	Madhya Pradesh

- Ankit Kushwah (Madhya Pradesh) made his List A debut.

=== Round 6 ===
4 March 2017
Scorecard

Andhra	v	Mumbai

- Girinath Reddy (Andhra) made his List A debut.

4 March 2017
Scorecard

Bengal	v	Madhya Pradesh

4 March 2017
Scorecard

Goa	v	Rajasthan

- Prathamesh Gawas (Goa) made his List A debut.

=== Round 7 ===
6 March 2017
Scorecard

Andhra	v	Rajasthan

- S. K. Kamaruddin (Andhra) made his List A debut.

6 March 2017
Scorecard

Bengal	v	Gujarat

- Abhishek Raman and Saurabh Singh (Bengal) both made their List A debuts.

6 March 2017
Scorecard

Goa	v	Mumbai
