= Pawan Kumar =

Pawan Kumar may refer to:

- Pawan Kumar (cricketer, born 1959), Indian cricketer, played 2 first-class matches for Hyderabad in 1984/85
- Pawan Kumar (cricketer, born 1969), Indian cricketer, played 21 first-class matches for Tripura between 1991 and 1999
- Pawan Kumar (cricketer, born 1970), Indian cricketer, played first-class cricket for Andhra and Hyderabad in 1993/94
- Pawan Kumar (cricketer, born 1972), Indian cricketer, played 2 first-class matches for Hyderabad in 1995/96
- Pawan Kumar (cricketer, born 1989), Indian cricketer, played first-class first for Puducherry in 2018–19 Ranji Trophy on 12 November 2018
- Pawan Kumar (director) (born 1982), Indian film director, actor and screenwriter
- Pawan Kumar (footballer, born 1990), Indian football goalkeeper
- Pawan Kumar (footballer, born 1995), Indian football defender
- Pawan Kumar (wrestler) (born 1993), Indian wrestler
- Pawan Kumar, Indian Army officer who died in the 2016 Pampore stand-off
- Pawan Kumar (researcher), materials science researcher
