= Indian cricket team in the West Indies in 1996–97 =

International cricket tour

Indian cricket team in West Indies in 1996-97
	India	West Indies
- Dates: 28 February – 3 May 1997
Captains	Sachin Tendulkar	Courtney Walsh

Test series
- Result: West Indies won the 5-match series 1–0
Most runs	Rahul Dravid (360)	Shivnarine Chanderpaul (443)
Most wickets	Anil Kumble (19)	Franklyn Rose (18)
- Player of the series: Shivnarine Chanderpaul (WI)

One Day International series
- Results: West Indies won the 4-match series 3–1
Most runs	Sourav Ganguly (122)	Shivnarine Chanderpaul (209)
Most wickets	Venkatesh Prasad (5)	Curtly Ambrose (6)
- Player of the series: Shivnarine Chanderpaul (WI)

The India national cricket team toured the West Indies from 28 February to 3 May 1997. They played five Test matches and four One Day Internationals (ODI) against the West Indies.

West Indies won the Test series 1–0. Shivnarine Chanderpaul of West Indies was named the player of the series after he scored 443 runs at an average of 73.83. West Indies also won the ODI series 3–1, and Chanderpaul was again named the player of the series, having scored 209 runs.

== Background ==
Before the tour began, India's leading pacer Javagal Srinath, then one of the five top-ranked bowlers in the ICC Rankings, was ruled out due to injury. India's tight schedule preceding the tour was blamed for it. Srinath picked up a shoulder injury in the 1996 Sahara Cup that worsened during his first spell in the third Test against South Africa at Johannesburg. He was subsequently made to bowl full ten overs in the seven-match ODI series that followed when the injury aggravated. His ruling out proved to a blow for India as West Indian batsman Brian Lara had then called Srinath the most "dangerous" pace bowler he had faced in his career. Leading into the series from India's May 1996 tour of England, Srinath had bowled an average of 47 overs per Test, the most by any bowler during that period. Spinner Noel David was flown immediately to the Caribbean, but his inclusion in the squad was denied to be as a replacement for Srinath by the BCCI, but "keeping with the requirements of the touring team management".

India had historically a poor record in the West Indies, having won only two of the 28 Tests played there leading into the series. They were also coming on the back of a 2–0 Test series defeat against an away series to South Africa.

== Test series ==
=== 1st Test ===
6–10 March 1997
Scorecard

West Indies	v	India
427 (137.4 overs); Carl Hooper 129 (212); Anil Kumble 5/120 (42.4 overs)		346 (146.5 overs); Nayan Mongia 78 (204); Franklyn Rose 6/100 (33 overs)
241/4d (66 overs); Brian Lara 78 (83); Anil Kumble 3/76 (23 overs)		99/2 (48 overs); Rahul Dravid 51 (141); Courtney Walsh 1/7 (8 overs)

Match drawn
Sabina Park, Kingston
Umpires: Steve Bucknor (WI) and Mervyn Kitchen (Eng)
Player of the match: Franklyn Rose (WI)

- West Indies won the toss and decided to bat
- Abey Kuruvilla (Ind), and Roland Holder and Franklyn Rose (WI) made their Test debuts.

=== 2nd Test ===
14–18 March 1997
Scorecard

West Indies	v	India
296 (114.3 overs); Roland Holder 91 (238); Anil Kumble 5/104 (39 overs)		436 (183.4 overs); Navjot Sidhu 201 (491); Curtly Ambrose 5/87 (41.4 overs)
299/6 (131 overs); Stuart Williams 128 (299); Sunil Joshi 3/57 (36 overs)

Match drawn
Queen's Park Oval, Port of Spain
Umpires: Lloyd Barker (WI) and Steve Randell (Aus)
Player of the match: Navjot Sidhu (Ind)

- West Indies won the toss and decided to bat
- Mervyn Dillon (WI) made his Test debut.

=== 3rd Test ===
27–31 March 1997
Scorecard

West Indies	v	India
298 (98.4 overs); Shivnarine Chanderpaul 137 (284); Venkatesh Prasad 5/82 (31.4 overs)		319 (106 overs); Sachin Tendulkar 92 (147); Franklyn Rose 4/77 (22 overs)
140 (45 overs); Brian Lara 45 (67); Abey Kuruvilla 5/68 (21 overs)		81 (35.5 overs); VVS Laxman 19 (61); Ian Bishop 4/22 (11.5 overs)

West Indies won by 38 runs
Kensington Oval, Bridgetown
Umpires: Lloyd Barker (WI) and Steve Randell (Aus)
Player of the match: Shivnarine Chanderpaul (WI)

- India won the toss and decided to field

=== 4th Test ===
4–8 April 1997
Scorecard

West Indies	v	India
333 (110.4 overs); Brian Lara 103 (178); Sunil Joshi 3/76 (23.4 overs)		212/2 (69 overs); Ajay Jadeja 96 (212); Courtney Walsh 1/37 (15 overs)

Match drawn
Antigua Recreation Ground, St John's
Umpires: Steve Bucknor (WI) and B. C. Cooray (SL)
Player of the match: Brian Lara (WI)

- West Indies won the toss and decided to bat

=== 5th Test ===
17–21 April 1997
Scorecard

India	v	West Indies
355 (168.3 overs); Rahul Dravid 92 (295); Carl Hooper 3/34 (18 overs)		145/3 (30 overs); Shivnarine Chanderpaul 58* (100); Sunil Joshi 1/11 (5 overs)

Match drawn
Bourda, Georgetown
Umpires: Eddie Nicholls (WI) and George Sharp (Eng)
Player of the match: Shivnarine Chanderpaul (WI) and Rahul Dravid (Ind)

- India won the toss and decided to bat

== ODI series ==
=== 1st ODI ===
26 April 1997
Scorecard

India; 179 (48.3 overs)	v	West Indies; 149/2 (27.5 overs)
Sachin Tendulkar 44 (43); Curtly Ambrose 4/36 (9.3 overs)		Shivnarine Chanderpaul 83 (88); Anil Kumble 1/23 (4 overs)

West Indies won by 8 wickets (Clark's Curve method)
Queen's Park Oval, Port of Spain
Umpires: Clyde Cumberbatch (WI) and Eddie Nicholls (WI)
Player of the match: Shivnarine Chanderpaul (WI)

- India won the toss and elected to bat.
- Rain breaks resulted in the West Indies target being set at 146 in 34 overs.
- Abey Kuruvilla (Ind) and Franklyn Rose (WI) made their ODI debuts.

India won the toss and elected to bat first on a bouncy wicket. Despite having scored a hundred in a warm-up game at the same venue on 24 April, Sourav Ganguly was not included in the side and Navjot Singh Sidhu replaced him. Sachin Tendulkar started strongly for India hitting four fours off Ian Bishop's second over. India lost Sidhu after Curtly Ambrose caught him lbw for 5. Tendulkar also fell to Ambrose after making 44 off 43 balls with the score at 65/2. Rahul Dravid and Mohammad Azharuddin fell in quick succession with the score at 86/4. Nayan Mongia (29) and Ajay Jadeja (19) put on 33 runs for the fifth wicket before the lower order followed them after the final wicket fell in the 19th over and the score at 179. Ambrose finished with four wickets. The innings was however interrupted by rain four times and a target of 146 in 34 overs was set for West Indies based on Clark's Curve. Shivnarine Chanderpaul continued his good form from the Test series into the match and scored 83 off 88 balls including 12 fours. His team reached the revised target in the 28th over with eight wickets to spare. Brian Lara and Carl Hooper took the team over the line with an unbeaten partnership of 17 runs.

=== 2nd ODI ===
27 April 1997
Scorecard

West Indies; 121 (43.5 overs)	v	India; 116/0 (23.1 overs)
Jimmy Adams 35* (85); Noel David 3/21 (8 overs)		Sachin Tendulkar 65* (70); Carl Hooper 0/4 (0.1 overs)

India won by 10 wickets (Clark's Curve method)
Queen's Park Oval, Port of Spain
Umpires: Clyde Cumberbatch (WI) and Eddie Nicholls (WI)
Player of the match: Abey Kuruvilla (Ind)

- India won the toss and elected to field.
- Rain resulted in India's target being set at 113 in 40 overs.
- Noel David (Ind) made his ODI debut.
- This was India's first international win in the West Indies since 1983.

The second game of the series was played on the same venue the next day with India winning the toss again and sending the West Indies to bat first on what was now a drier pitch and overcast conditions. India made three changes: Sourav Ganguly was included in the side in place of an off-form Robin Singh, spinner Sunil Joshi was dropped for debutante Noel David and Saba Karim replaced an injured Nayan Mongia as wicket-keeper. West Indies got off to a poor start losing two wickets for 5 runs, including Brian Lara for a golden duck. India's pacers Venkatesh Prasad and Abey Kuruvilla picked the said two wickets and picked up three more reducing West Indies for 32/5. Jimmy Adams and Ian Bishop put on 56 runs for the seventh wicket before the latter got out caught for 31. Wickets fell in quick succession and the team ended at 121 after playing 43.5 overs. Rain interruptions reduced India's target to 119 from 46 overs and later 113 from 42 overs. Ganguly and Sachin Tendulkar started off well for India taking the team's score off the mark in the 24th over, both remaining unbeaten at 39 and 65 respectively. Kuruvilla was named player of the match.

=== 3rd ODI ===
30 April 1997
Scorecard

West Indies; 249/9 (50 overs)	v	India; 231 (48.2 overs)
Stuart Williams 76 (110); Venkatesh Prasad 2/53 (10 overs)		Sourav Ganguly 79 (108); Ottis Gibson 4/61 (10 overs)

West Indies won by 18 runs
Arnos Vale Stadium, Kingstown
Umpires: Lloyd Barker (WI) and Steve Bucknor (WI)
Player of the match: Stuart Williams (WI)

- India won the toss and elected to field.

India won the toss and put West Indies, who replaced Ian Bishop by Ottis Gibson, to bat first on a rough wicket with "slight" grass. Abey Kuruvilla trapped Shivnarine Chanderpaul lbw early on before opener Stuart Williams and Brian Lara put on 60 runs for the second wicket. Jimmy Adams was promoted up the order but was dismissed by Noel David for 9. Williams, still at the crease, added another 84 runs for the fourth wicket with Carl Hooper before losing his wicket for Tendulkar after making 76. The lower order batted through the entire 50 overs taking the total to 249. For India, Tendulkar started off with a four before being bowled by a Courtney Walsh delivery in the fifth over that kept low. Rahul Dravid joined opener Sourav Ganguly and the two put on 130 runs, then the highest partnership for the second wicket for India, scoring at a steady pace, both going past 70s. With Dravid dismissed by Gibson, India need 94 off 96 balls with eight wickets in hand. Ganguly fell a few overs later, leaving his team 56 to get off 60. The middle and lower order batsmen fell quickly, losing eight wickets in nine overs for 46 runs, owing to poor shots and running, winding up after making 231, falling 18 runs short of the target. Gibson who gave away the most runs (61) of all the West Indies' bowlers, also picked three of the said wickets.

=== 4th ODI ===
3 May 1997
Scorecard

India; 199/7 (50 overs)	v	West Indies; 200/0 (44.4 overs)
Ajay Jadeja 68 (78); Courtney Walsh 2/26 (9 overs)		Shivnarine Chanderpaul 109* (134); Ajay Jadeja 0/6 (2.4 overs)

West Indies won by 10 wickets
Kensington Oval, Bridgetown
Umpires: Lloyd Barker (WI) and Steve Bucknor (WI)
Player of the match: Shivnarine Chanderpaul (WI)

- West Indies won the toss and elected to field.
- The 200-run partnership between Shivnarine Chanderpaul and Stuart Williams was a record for West Indies for the first wicket.

Having been put to bat, India lost its openers inside five overs for 6 runs. The poor start reduced India to 17/2 at the end of ten overs before recovering to reach 62/2 after 20 overs, with Rahul Dravid and Mohammad Azharuddin in the middle. After they fell, Robin Singh (29) and Ajay Jadeja (68) put on 75 runs. A slower scoring rate throughout the innings took the total to a low 199 at the end of 50 overs. In response, West Indies opener, Chanderpaul started off strongly scoring boundaries in regular intervals, and despite looking vulnerable to the seaming ball at the start, his opening partner Stuart Williams stuck on and remained unbeaten at 78 taking the team past the line. Chanderpaul meanwhile scored his first ODI hundred before finishing unbeaten at 109 off 134 balls and was named player of the match and the series.
