= Maheshwar Singh =

Maheshwar Singh is an Indian name and may refer to:

- Maheshwar Singh (cricketer)
- Maheshwar Singh (Kullu politician)
- Maheshwar Singh (Bihar politician)
