= Anshul =

Anshul is an Indian name. It may be either a surname or a given name.

== People ==
- Anshul Chauhan (born 1986), Indian film director
- Anshul Gupta (born 1989), Indian cricketer
- Anshul Jubli (born 1995), Indian mixed martial arts fighter
- Anshul Kothari (born 1989), Indian swimmer
- Anshul Pandey (born 1994), Indian television actor
- Anshul Trivedi (born 1992), Indian actor
- Anshul Verma (born 1974), Indian politician

== See also ==
- Jaggulal Anshul (born 1988), Indian cricketer
