= Bharath Reddy =

Bharath Reddy may refer to:

- Bharath Reddy (actor), Indian actor
- Bharath Reddy (cricketer), Indian cricketer
