= Sinderraj Lokenderraj =

Indian cricketer (born 1938)

Personal information
- Born: 9 February 1938 (age 88); Hyderabad, India
- Source: ESPNcricinfo, 19 April 2016

Sinderraj Lokenderraj (born 9 February 1938) is an Indian former cricketer. He played three first-class matches for Hyderabad between 1960 and 1962.

== See also ==
- List of Hyderabad cricketers
