= Sangani Kiran Kumar =

Indian cricketer (born 1975)

Personal information
- Born: 10 September 1975 (age 51); Hyderabad, India
- Source: Cricinfo, 17 April 2016

Sangani Kiran Kumar (born 10 September 1975) is an Indian former cricketer. He played seven first-class matches for Hyderabad between 1995 and 1997.

== See also ==
- List of Hyderabad cricketers
