= Shaikh Riazuddin =

Indian cricketer (born 1971)

Personal information
- Born: 11 May 1971 (age 55); Anantapur, India
- Source: ESPNcricinfo, 24 April 2016

Shaikh Riazuddin (born 11 May 1971) is an Indian former cricketer. He played six first-class matches for Hyderabad between 1994 and 2000.

== See also ==
- List of Hyderabad cricketers
