= Krishnakant Patel =

Indian cricketer (1927–1988)

Personal information
- Born: 16 October 1927; Bangalore, India
- Died: 12 April 1988 (aged 60); Bangalore, India
- Source: ESPNcricinfo, 23 April 2016

Krishnakant Patel (16 October 1927 – 12 April 1988) was an Indian cricketer. He played first-class cricket for Hyderabad and Mysore between 1949 and 1959.

== See also ==
- List of Hyderabad cricketers
