= Bhavan's Sri RamaKrishna Vidyalaya =

Coordinates: 17.490968°N 78.535234°E

- Sainikpuri; Secunderabad, Telangana, 500 094; India

Information
- Type: Private
- Motto: Let noble thoughts come to us from every side
- Established: 6 March 1974
- Founders: Late Brig. M. K. Rao and Late Lt. Col. Tiwari
- School board: Central Board of Secondary Education
- Oversight: Bharatiya Vidya Bhavan
- School code: 3630003
- Director: Sri.D.Prabhakar Rao
- Principal: Smt. Vinitha Suresh
- Faculty: 167
- Gender: Co-educational
- Enrollment: approx. 4,300
- Classes: LKG to XII
- Student to teacher ratio: 40:1
- Language: English
- Campus size: 22 acres (8.9 ha)
- Campus type: Urban
- Houses: Aurobindo; Lord Buddha; Mahavir; Rama Krishna; Saradamata; Swami Vivekananda
- Team name: Bhavanites
- Alumni: Ambati Rayudu Pragyan Ojha Darpan Vasudev
- Website: www.bsrkv.edu.in

Bhavan's Sri RamaKrishna Vidyalaya (BSRKV) is a co-educational private school in Sainikpuri, Secunderabad, Telangana, India with provision to teach classes from LKG to Class 12. It is run by the Bharatiya Vidya Bhavan educational trust and affiliated with the Central Board of Secondary Education (CBSE). It is listed with the Hyderabad Sahodaya Schools Complex and is a leading choice for parents to choose from in Sainikpuri. There are provisions for after-school coaching in sports such as cricket, football and a host of indoor activities. The school also offers NCC training for students. The school was inaugurated in the year 1974. The institution has a huge green campus, excellent sports coaching and ventilated school buildings. The school also has a state of the art cricket training academy, and has produced couple of national level cricketers such as Pragyan Ojha and Ambati Rayudu, who were both trained by T. Vijay Paul.

The school has 6 houses, each named after great Indian philosophers, religious leaders and spiritual teachers. Each house is specified with a color.

== History ==
The Bhavan's Sri Ramakrishna Vidyalaya, initially just Ramakrishna Vidyalaya, a residential school being managed by the Ramakrishna Math along with the Sarada Devi Hospital on the A. S. Rao Nagar Main Road, was later handed over to Bharatiya Vidya Bhavan. Some of its founder members were Late Brig. M. K. Rao and Late Lt. Col. Tiwari. Distinguished retired members of the armed forces continue to serve on the board and council of the Bhavan's Sri Ramakrishna Vidyalaya in various capacities.
