= Fathima Reddy =

Indian cricketer (born 1979)

Personal information
- Born: 31 August 1979 (age 47); Hyderabad, India
- Source: ESPNcricinfo, 24 April 2016

Fathima Reddy (born 31 August 1979) is an Indian former cricketer. He played one List A match for Hyderabad in 1999/00.

== See also ==
- List of Hyderabad cricketers
