= Mohammad Mohiuddin =

Indian cricketer (born 1977)

Personal information
- Born: 5 February 1977 (age 49); Hyderabad, India
- Source: ESPNcricinfo, 20 April 2016

Mohammad Mohiuddin (born 5 February 1977) is an Indian former cricketer. He played five first-class matches for Hyderabad between 1994 and 1999.

== See also ==
- List of Hyderabad cricketers
