= Timothy Ravi Kumar =

Indian cricketer (born 1975)

Personal information
- Born: 8 November 1975 (age 51); Hyderabad, India
- Source: ESPNcricinfo, 24 April 2016

Timothy Ravi Kumar (born 8 November 1975) is an Indian cricketer. He played two first-class matches for Hyderabad in 1997/98. He made his List A debut on 14 December 2021, for Hyderabad in the 2021–22 Vijay Hazare Trophy.

== See also ==
- List of Hyderabad cricketers
