= Syed Meeraj =

Indian cricketer (born 1973)

Personal information
- Born: 29 December 1973 (age 52); Hyderabad, India
- Source: ESPNcricinfo, 20 April 2016

Syed Meeraj (born 29 December 1973) is an Indian former cricketer. He played seven first-class matches for Hyderabad between 1993 and 1998.

== See also ==
- List of Hyderabad cricketers
