= Katikaneni Chakravarthy =

Indian cricketer (born 1970)

Personal information
- Born: 26 November 1970 (age 55); Hyderabad, India
- Source: ESPNcricinfo, 17 April 2016

Katikaneni Chakravarthy (born 26 November 1970) is an Indian former cricketer. He was a right-handed batsman and bowled right-arm offbreak. He played one first-class match for Hyderabad in 1994/95, taking 1 wicket.

== See also ==
- List of Hyderabad cricketers
