= Pottimuthyala Ramesh Kumar =

Indian cricketer (born 1964)

Personal information
- Born: 13 July 1964 (age 62); Hyderabad, India
- Source: ESPNcricinfo, 24 April 2016

Pottimuthyala Ramesh Kumar (born 13 July 1964) is an Indian former cricketer. He played five first-class matches for Hyderabad between 1989 and 1993.

== See also ==
- List of Hyderabad cricketers
