= Pondicharry Rangaraj =

Indian cricketer (born 1968)

Personal information
- Born: 17 May 1968 (age 58); Bangalore, India
- Source: ESPNcricinfo, 24 April 2016

Pondicharry Rangaraj (born 17 May 1968) is an Indian former cricketer. He played two first-class matches for Hyderabad in 1989/90.

== See also ==
- List of Hyderabad cricketers
