= M. S. Sriram =

Indian cricketer (born 1934)

Personal information
- Born: 30 September 1934 (age 92); Secunderabad, India
- Source: ESPNcricinfo, 24 April 2016

M. S. Sriram (born 30 September 1934) is an Indian former cricketer. He played 24 first-class matches for Hyderabad between 1954 and 1962.

== See also ==
- List of Hyderabad cricketers
