= L. N. Prasad Reddy =

Indian cricketer (born 1977)

Personal information
- Full name: Lindala Narasimha Prasad Reddy
- Born: 29 December 1977 (age 48); Anantapur, India
- Source: ESPNcricinfo, 18 July 2020

L. N. Prasad Reddy (born 29 December 1977) is an Indian former cricketer. He played first-class cricket for Andhra between 1998 and 2010. He played 53 first class matches and 29 List A matches. He is a right handed batsman and a wicket keeper.

== See also ==
- List of Hyderabad cricketers
