= Mehboob Nausheer =

Indian cricketer (born 1934)

Personal information
- Born: 24 December 1934 (age 91); Hyderabad, India
- Source: ESPNcricinfo, 23 April 2016

Mehboob Nausheer (born 24 December 1934) is an Indian former cricketer. He played nine first-class matches for Hyderabad between 1956 and 1959.

== See also ==
- List of Hyderabad cricketers
