= Zakir Hussain (Hyderabad cricketer) =

Indian cricketer (born 1964)

Personal information
- Born: 24 December 1964 (age 61); Hyderabad, India
- Source: Cricinfo, 17 April 2016

Zakir Hussain (born 24 December 1964) is an Indian former cricketer. He played first-class cricket for Hyderabad and the United Arab Emirates between 1988 and 2005.

== See also ==
- List of Hyderabad cricketers
