= Ibrahim Khan (Indian cricketer) =

Indian cricketer (1911–1977)

Personal information
- Full name: Mohammad Ibrahim Khan
- Born: 20 December 1911; Alwar, British India
- Died: 19 February 1977 (aged 65); Hyderabad, Pakistan

Domestic team information
- Years: Team
- 1935/36–1954/55: Hyderabad

Career statistics
| Competition | FC |
|---|---|
| Matches | 25 |
| Runs scored | 585 |
| Batting average | 17.20 |
| 100s/50s | 0/1 |
| Top score | 59 |
| Balls bowled | 4,008 |
| Wickets | 81 |
| Bowling average | 23.13 |
| 5 wickets in innings | 3 |
| 10 wickets in match | 1 |
| Best bowling | 8/107 |
| Catches/stumpings | 15/– |
- Source: ESPNcricinfo

Mohammad Ibrahim Khan (20 December 1911 – 19 February 1977) was an Indian cricketer. He played 25 first-class matches for Hyderabad between 1935 and 1955.

== See also ==
- List of Hyderabad cricketers
