= A. Chatterjee =

Indian cricketer (born 1966)

Personal information
- Born: 22 June 1966 (age 60); Calcutta, India
- Source: ESPNcricinfo, 17 April 2016

A. Chatterjee (born 22 June 1966) is an Indian former cricketer. He played one first-class match for Hyderabad in 1984/85.

== See also ==
- List of Hyderabad cricketers
