= Feredune Dittia =

Indian cricketer (1919–1985)

Personal information
- Full name: Feredune Dhanjishaw Dittia
- Born: 1919
- Died: 16 February 1985 (aged 65–66); Secunderabad, India
- Source: ESPNcricinfo, 17 April 2016

Feredune Dhanjishaw Dittia (1919 – 16 February 1985) was an Indian cricketer. He played first-class cricket for Hyderabad and Services between 1940 and 1951.

== See also ==
- List of Hyderabad cricketers
