= Ehtesham Ali Khan =

Indian cricketer (born 1965)

Personal information
- Full name: Mohammed Ehtesham Ali Khan
- Born: 15 July 1965 (age 61); Hyderabad, India
- Source: ESPNcricinfo, 16 October 2016

Ehtesham Ali Khan (born 15 July 1965) is an Indian former cricketer. He played 44 first-class matches for Hyderabad between 1984 and 1992.

== See also ==
- List of Hyderabad cricketers
