= Papi Reddy =

Indian cricketer (born 1976)

Personal information
- Born: 1 April 1976 (age 50); Bolarum, India
- Source: ESPNcricinfo, 24 April 2016

Papi Reddy (born 1 April 1976) is an Indian former cricketer. He played two first-class matches for Hyderabad in 1995/96.

== See also ==
- List of Hyderabad cricketers
