= M. V. Bobjee =

Indian cricketer (1917–1981)

Personal information
- Born: 11 November 1917; Madras, India
- Died: 10 October 1981 (aged 63); Madras, India
- Source: ESPNcricinfo, 17 April 2016

M. V. Bobjee (11 November 1917 – 10 October 1981) was an Indian tennis and cricket player. He played first-class cricket for several domestic teams in India between 1941 and 1958.

== See also ==
- List of Hyderabad cricketers
