= Edulji Aibara =

Indian cricketer

Eddie Aibara
Personal information
- Full name: Edulji Bujorji Aibara
- Born: 25 April 1914; India
- Died: 7 November 2000 (aged 86); Secunderabad, Andhra Pradesh, India
- Batting: Right-handed
- Role: Batsman
- Relatives: Sorabji Mehta (uncle); Naushir Mehta (cousin)

Domestic team information
- Years: Team
- 1934–1959: Hyderabad

Career statistics
Competition	First-class
Matches	71
Runs scored	3,819
Batting average	36.72
100s/50s	9/18
Top score	144*
Balls bowled	116
Wickets	2
Bowling average	39.50
5 wickets in innings	0
10 wickets in match	0
Best bowling	1/5
Catches/stumpings	15/–
- Source: ESPNcricinfo, 16 April 2023

Edulji Bujorji "Eddie" Aibara (25 April 1914 – 7 November 2000) was an Indian first-class cricketer who played for Hyderabad in the Ranji Trophy.

Although most of his first-class games were for Hyderabad (51), Aibara represented several additional sides, the other twenty being divided mostly between the Parsees cricket team and South Zone.

Aibara was a right-handed middle order batsman and often captained Hyderabad. He played a part in both of Hyderabad's two Ranji Trophy wins despite them being 50 years apart, as a player in 1937–38 where he scored the match winning hundred and as coach in 1986–87. His effort in the 1937–38 Final against Nawanagar is what he is best remembered for, his innings of 137 not out came in a game where the next highest score by a player from either team was 67 and it was his maiden first-class hundred. Hyderabad had been dismissed for just 113 in their first innings and were set the task of chasing 310 to win in the fourth innings. Aibara came into bat with his side at 3 for 67 and guided Hyderabad home with just one wicket to spare.

He retired in 1959 after making 2849 runs at 38.50 for Hyderabad with nine hundreds. The highest of those was an unbeaten 144 which he made as captain in a win against Central Provinces and Berar in 1949/50.

Aibara died at the age of 86 in 2000. Several months prior he had suffered a fall while travelling to a coaching clinic, after which his health had slowly deteriorated.
