= G. Srinivas =

Indian cricketer (born 1971)

Personal information
- Born: 18 December 1971 (age 54)
- Source: ESPNcricinfo, 24 April 2016

G. Srinivas (born 18 December 1971) is an Indian former cricketer. He played two List A matches for Hyderabad in 1997/98.

== See also ==
- List of Hyderabad cricketers
