= Ghulam Qureshi =

Indian cricketer (1918–1994)

Personal information
- Full name: Ghulam Dastagir Qureshi
- Born: 1918; British India
- Died: 12 January 1994 (aged 75–76); Hyderabad, Andhra Pradesh, India

Domestic team information
- Years: Team
- 1936–1955: Hyderabad

Career statistics
Competition	FC
Matches	17
Runs scored	530
Batting average	20.38
100s/50s	0/3
Top score	66
Balls bowled	198
Wickets	2
Bowling average	106.50
5 wickets in innings	0
10 wickets in match	0
Best bowling	1/4
Catches/stumpings	5/–
- Source: ESPNcricinfo

Ghulam Dastagir Qureshi (1918 – 12 January 1994) was an Indian cricketer. He played 17 first-class matches for Hyderabad between 1936 and 1955.

== See also ==
- List of Hyderabad cricketers
