= Faiz Baig =

Indian cricketer (born 1956)

Personal information
- Born: 20 June 1956 (age 70)
- Source: ESPNcricinfo, 17 April 2016

Faiz Baig (born 20 June 1956) is an Indian former cricketer. He played eighteen first-class matches for Hyderabad between 1980 and 1984.

== See also ==
- List of Hyderabad cricketers
