= Santosh Reddy =

Indian cricketer

Personal information
- Full name: Nayini Santosh Kumar Reddy
- Born: 22 October 1938 (age 88); Madras, India
- Batting: Left-handed
- Role: Batsman

Domestic team information
- Years: Team
- 1966–1970: Hyderabad
- 1959–1961: Cambridge University

Career statistics
Competition	First-class
Matches	61
Runs scored	2,284
Batting average	24.29
100s/50s	2/12
Top score	113*
Balls bowled	468
Wickets	5
Bowling average	61.20
5 wickets in innings	0
10 wickets in match	0
Best bowling	3/26
Catches/stumpings	37/0
- Source: ESPNcricinfo, 26 October 2020

Nayini Santosh Kumar Reddy (born 22 October 1938) is an Indian former cricketer. He played first-class cricket for Cambridge University and Hyderabad between 1959 and 1971.

Santosh Reddy studied in The Doon School and later in St John's College, Cambridge. He played cricket for Cambridge from 1959 to 1961 with future England cricketers Mike Brearley, Tony Lewis and Roger Prideaux. He won a Blue at cricket in all three years.

Reddy scored two first class hundreds, both for Cambridge - 103 v Combined Services in 1960 and 113 not out v Somerset in 1961. An occasional left arm bowler, Reddy took 3 wickets in 3 overs to nearly bowl Cambridge to a win against Somerset in the match they lost by one wicket. In his autobiography, Tony Lewis described Reddy as "a little man with a small frame and thick spectacles" who "spoke with an inconsistent lisp that was a delightful affectation not an impediment."

Reddy played 42 times for Cambridge between 1959 and 1961 and scored 1802 runs. After returning to India, he played 18 more first class matches between 1967 and 1970, including 12 Ranji Trophy matches for Hyderabad, with less success.
