= Hari Prasad Kovelamudi =

Indian doctor and author

- Born: India
- Title: Chairman of Care Hospitals
- Spouse: Dr. K. Suma Prasad

Hari Prasad Kovelamudi is an Indian doctor, an author and the chairman of Quality Care India Limited, a platform that runs Care Hospitals, Kerala Institute of Medical Sciences and Evercare Hospital Dhaka. He was earlier the President of Apollo Hospitals, where he played a pivotal role in shaping the journey of Apollo Hospitals having overseen the growth from 1,200 beds to 10,000 beds today.

Prasad is a pioneer of emergency medicine in the country and established emergency medicine as a specialty in the country. He is first individual outside Europe to be honoured with the Fellowship of College of Emergency Medicine, UK and the first individual in India to be honored with a fellowship by the International Federation for Emergency Medicine. He has also been honoured with the Life Time Achievement Award by the Society for Emergency Medicine, India

== Education & Cricket ==
Prasad did his primary schooling in The Hyderabad Public School, Begumpet where Satya Nadella & CV Anand were his juniors. He started playing cricket in school and went on to represent the Hyderabad cricket team in the Ranji Trophy between 1981 and 1984.

== Books ==
- I'mPossible (Autobiography)
- Qualitinomics: Healthcare Quality Simplified

== Awards and achievements ==
- The Economic Times Healthcare CEO of the Year
- Emergency Medicine Legend of India
