= Vinayak Bhoir =

Indian cricketer (born 1988)

Personal information
- Born: 2 September 1988 (age 38)
- Source: Cricinfo, 3 March 2017

Vinayak Bhoir (born 2 September 1988) is an Indian cricketer. He made his List A debut for Mumbai in the 2016–17 Vijay Hazare Trophy on 3 March 2017. He made his first-class debut on 11 January 2020, for Mumbai in the 2019–20 Ranji Trophy.
