= Abdul Azeem =

Indian cricketer (1960–2023)

Personal information
- Full name: Abdul Azeem
- Born: 10 June 1960; Hyderabad, Andhra Pradesh, India
- Died: 18 April 2023 (aged 62)
- Batting: Right-handed
- Role: Batsman

Domestic team information
- Years: Team
- 1979/80-1994/95: Hyderabad
- Source: ESPNcricinfo, 26 February, 2016

Abdul Azeem (10 June 1960 – 18 April 2023) was an Indian cricketer. He was the first player from the south zone and the seventh Indian to score a triple century in the Ranji Trophy (1986 versus Tamil Nadu). In a 15-year career for the Hyderabad cricket team, he scored more than 4000 runs in first class cricket.

In September 2014, Azeem was named coach of the Hyderabad cricket team along with Noel David as Azeem's assistant while NS Ganesh was the fielding coach of the Hyderabad cricket team.

In November 2018, Azeem left the Jr. Selection panel of the Hyderabad Cricket Players Association saying procedures were not being followed selecting the squad.

Azeem died from kidney failure on 18 April 2023, at the age of 62.
