= Waheed Yar Khan =

Indian-Pakistani cricketer

Personal information
- Born: 9 November 1942 (age 84); Hyderabad, Hyderabad State, British India
- Batting: Right-handed

Domestic team information
- Years: Team
- 1960-61 to 1968-69: Hyderabad
- 1965-66 to 1968-69: State Bank of India
- 1969-70: Karachi Whites
- 1969-70 to 1975-76: Pakistan International Airlines

Career statistics
Competition	First-class
Matches	59
Runs scored	2453
Batting average	38.93
100s/50s	4/18
Top score	174*
Balls bowled	94
Wickets	4
Bowling average	12.50
5 wickets in innings	0
10 wickets in match	0
Best bowling	1/3
Catches/stumpings	41/–
- Source: Cricinfo, 26 March 2015

Waheed Yar Khan (born 9 November 1942) is a former Pakistani cricketer who played first-class cricket in India from 1960 to 1968, and in Pakistan from 1969 to 1975.

== Career in India ==
Khan was born in Hyderabad when it was part of Hyderabad State in British India. A batsman, he represented South Zone Schools in the Cooch Behar Trophy from 1957-58 to 1959-60, captaining the team to victory in 1959-60. He then represented Osmania University in the Rohinton Baria Trophy from 1960-61 to 1964-65.

He made his first-class debut for Hyderabad in the Ranji Trophy in 1960-61, and played occasionally over the next three seasons. When Hyderabad reached the finals in 1964-65 he made 67 not out in the quarter-final, 109 (his first century) in the semi-final, and was Hyderabad's top-scorer in the final with 78 and 23 when they lost to Bombay. He played one match for South Zone, when they were skittled for 62 by a West Indian attack led by Charlie Griffith in 1966-67. He did not score another century until he made 174 not out for Hyderabad against Andhra in 1968-69, when he added 258 for the fourth wicket with Kenia Jayantilal.

== Career in Pakistan ==
In 1969, Khan followed his parents, who had moved to Pakistan. He was immediately selected to play for Karachi Whites and Pakistan International Airlines.

He had his best season in Pakistan in 1970-71 when he scored 342 runs in five matches at an average of 68.40, including 116 not out for Pakistan International Airlines B against National Bank in the BCCP Trophy. His last century came in 1972-73 when he made 119 for PIA against Lahore B.

Khan lives in retirement in Margate, Florida, with his wife, Rehana.
