= Vijay Paul =

Indian cricketer

Personal information
- Full name: T. Vijay Paul
- Died: 16 December 2016 (aged 64); Hyderabad, Telangana, India
- Role: Batsman

Domestic team information
- Years: Team
- 1974/75–1982/83: Hyderabad

Career statistics
Competition	FC	List A
Matches	34	1
Runs scored	1,583	7
Batting average	35.97	7.00
100s/50s	2/10	0/0
Top score	156*	7
Balls bowled	–	–
Wickets	–	–
Bowling average	–	–
5 wickets in innings	–	–
10 wickets in match	–	n/a
Best bowling	–	–
Catches/stumpings	14/–	0/–
- Source: ESPNcricinfo, 18 August 2019

T. Vijay Paul (died 16 December 2016), also spelled T. Vijaya Paul, was an Indian first-class cricketer who played for Hyderabad. He worked as a cricket coach and selector after retirement.

== Life and career ==
Paul appeared in 34 first-class matches, representing Hyderabad in the Ranji Trophy between 1974/75 and 1982/83 seasons after making his first-class debut with Vazir Sultan Tobacco XI during the 1971/72 season. A "solid and compact" middle-order batsman, Paul scored 1583 runs in his first-class career, including two centuries, at an average of 35.97. He played for Andhra Bank in local cricket leagues and captained the team to Grand Slam tournament titles.

Paul continued to be associated with the game after his retirement in 1984. He became a cricket coach, training cricketers across various parts of Secunderabad such as Gymkhana Ground, Bhavan's Sri RamaKrishna Vidyalaya and CAL Public School, Kapra. According to Telangana Today, he was one of the "most sought-after coaches" in the city, known for his "methodical coaching". Among the notable cricketers who trained under him during their early days were Pragyan Ojha and Ambati Rayudu. Paul also worked as a selector.

Paul died on 16 December 2016 at the age of 64. He was married, with two sons.
