= Venkatesh Rao =

Indian cricketer (born 1939)

Personal information
- Born: 16 June 1939 (age 87); Madras, India
- Source: ESPNcricinfo, 24 April 2016

Venkatesh Rao (born 16 June 1939) is an Indian former cricketer. He played 56 first-class matches for Hyderabad between 1955 and 1968.

== See also ==
- List of Hyderabad cricketers
