= Habib Khan =

Indian cricketer

Personal information
- Full name: Mohammad Habib Khan
- Born: 14 December 1937 (age 88); Hyderabad, India
- Source: ESPNcricinfo, 17 April 2016

Habib Khan (born 14 December 1937) is an Indian former cricketer. He played in 40 first-class cricket matches for Hyderabad, Railways and Services between 1956 and 1971.

== See also ==
- List of Hyderabad cricketers
