= M. V. Ramanamurthy =

Indian cricketer (born 1965)

Personal information
- Born: 28 May 1965 (age 61); Rajahmundry, Andhra Pradesh
- Source: ESPNcricinfo, 24 April 2016

M. V. Ramanamurthy (born 28 May 1965) is an Indian former cricketer. He played 36 first-class matches for Hyderabad between 1986 and 1994.

== See also ==
- List of Hyderabad cricketers
