= Franklyn Rose =

West Indian cricketer (born 1972)

Personal information
- Full name: Franklyn Albert Rose
- Born: 1 February 1972 (age 54); Chalky Hill, Saint Ann, Jamaica
- Nickname: Frankie, Rosey
- Height: 6 ft 5 in (1.96 m)
- Batting: Right-handed
- Bowling: Right-arm fast

International information
- National side: West Indies (1997–2000)
- Test debut (cap 215): 6 March 1997 v India
- Last Test: 3 August 2000 v England
- ODI debut (cap 82): 26 April 1997 v India
- Last ODI: 20 July 2000 v England

Domestic team information
- Years: Team
- 1992–2003: Jamaica
- 1998: Northamptonshire
- 2001–2002: Gauteng
- 2003: Surrey

Career statistics
Competition	Test	ODI	FC	LA
Matches	19	27	94	81
Runs scored	344	217	1,426	419
Batting average	13.23	12.05	13.08	9.52
100s/50s	0/1	0/0	0/2	0/0
Top score	69	30	96	37
Balls bowled	3,124	1,326	14,273	3,777
Wickets	53	29	296	99
Bowling average	30.88	36.06	26.51	27.37
5 wickets in innings	2	1	14	3
10 wickets in match	0	0	2	0
Best bowling	7/84	5/23	7/39	5/14
Catches/stumpings	4/–	6/–	24/–	18/–
- Source: Cricket Archive, 24 October 2016

Franklyn Albert Rose (born 1 February 1972) is a former West Indian cricketer. He is a right-handed batsman and a fast right-arm bowler who possesses a lot of power with his full-length outswing.

== International career ==
In the first innings in which he participated, he achieved figures of 6 for 100, but for Test after Test beyond this, his bowling disappointed in comparison, only picking up during a Test match in Durban, where he achieved figures of 7 for 84.

Rose hit a match-turning 69 during the second Test against Zimbabwe in 2000. Coming in at 170 for 7, in reply to the visitors' 308, he and Jimmy Adams (101 n.o.) added a record 148 for the eighth wicket in the Windies 10-wicket victory. He was subsequently named Man-of-the-Series.

Later that year, his aggression cost West Indies the second Test at Lord's when his attempts to shake England's Dominic Cork with short-pitched bowling leaked valuable runs in a low-scoring game.

Although he was dropped for good at age 28, his final Test bowling average of 30.88 stood as the lowest of any West Indian pacer of his generation until Kemar Roach emerged nearly a decade later.

== Domestic career ==
Rose has played for various more community-based outfits since departing from the international scene. One more prominent appointment was his recruitment for the 2004 season in England for Lashings Cricket Club. Rose, always a controversial figure in any cricketing scene, be it local, national or international, in turn fell out with equally controversial chairman of Lashings David Folb. Rose has also played in Sydney, Australia, and for the Chicago Tornadoes of the USA's Pro Cricket league.

== Personal life ==
Up to 2016, he resided in Auckland, where he played and coached at Birkenhead City Cricket Club on Auckland's North Shore during the 2011–12 season.

His work visa in New Zealand expired in March 2012 however remained there until his deportation back to Jamaica in April 2016. He was served with a deportation order in 2014. 5 Weeks prior to his deportation he was detained in Mount Eden Jail

When he attempted to stay in New Zealand his visa was already expired and he was under investigation in New Zealand for rape. He was deported to Jamaica.

== See also ==
- List of West Indies cricketers who have taken five-wicket hauls on Test debut
