= Khlid Qayyum =

Indian cricketer (born 1958)

Personal information
- Full name: Khlid Abdul Qayyum
- Born: 21 November 1958 (age 67); Hyderabad, India
- Source: ESPNcricinfo, 23 April 2016

Khlid Qayyum (born 21 November 1958) is an Indian former cricketer. He played 67 first-class matches for Hyderabad between 1976 and 1990.

After retirement from cricket, he moved to Atlanta where he worked as an IT professional. In 2023, he returned to Hyderabad to set up a cricket academy.

== Education ==
Khalid studied at the All Saints High School. He also obtained a Bachelor's in Commerce from Nizam College between 1977 and 1980.

== See also ==
- List of Hyderabad cricketers
