= Jaggulal Anshul =

Indian cricketer (born 1988)

Personal information
- Born: 22 April 1988 (age 38); Hyderabad, India

Jaggulal Anshul (born 22 April 1988) is an Indian cricketer. He plays first-class cricket for Hyderabad.

== See also ==
- List of Hyderabad cricketers
