= A. L. Narasimhan =

Indian cricket umpire (born 1940)

Personal information
- Born: 27 April 1940 (age 86)

Umpiring information
- Tests umpired: 1 (1994)
- ODIs umpired: 4 (1983–1993)
- Source: ESPNcricinfo, 14 July 2013

A. L. Narasimhan (born 27 April 1940) is a former Indian cricket umpire. He stood in one Test match, between India and Sri Lanka in 1994, and four ODI games between 1983 and 1993.

== See also ==
- List of Test cricket umpires
- List of One Day International cricket umpires
