= Pawan Kumar (cricketer, born 1969) =

Indian cricketer (born 1969)

Personal information
- Born: 2 March 1969 (age 57); Patna, India
- Source: Cricinfo, 18 April 2016

Pawan Kumar (born 2 March 1969) is an Indian former cricketer. He played twenty-one first-class matches for Tripura between 1991 and 1999.
