= Shahid Akbar =

Indian cricketer (1958–2012)

Personal information
- Born: 6 September 1958; Hyderabad, India
- Died: 28 November 2012 (aged 54)
- Source: Cricinfo, 16 April 2016

Shahid Akbar (6 September 1958 – 28 November 2012) was an Indian cricketer. He played 31 first-class matches for Hyderabad between 1976 and 1984.

== See also ==
- List of Hyderabad cricketers
