= Dasi Prabhu Kiran =

Indian cricketer (born 1989)

Dasi Prabhu Kiran (born 24 February 1989 in Vijayawada, Andhra Pradesh) is an Indian cricketer who plays first-class cricket for Andhra Pradesh. He is a right hand opening batsman who bowls right arm medium. Having played youth cricket for Andhra Pradesh he made his first-team debut in a one-day match against Tamil Nadu in February 2007, batting in the lower order he scored 16 not out. He made his first-class debut against the same opposition in November 2008.
