= Sorabji Mehta =

Indian cricketer (1904–1988)

Personal information
- Full name: Sorabji Rustomji Mehta
- Born: 1904
- Died: 2 May 1988 (aged 83–84); Hyderabad, India
- Source: ESPNcricinfo, 20 April 2016

Sorabji Mehta (1904 – 2 May 1988) was an Indian cricketer. He played 22 first-class matches for Hyderabad between 1937 and 1953. He also played first-class cricket for the Parsees in the 1930s and 1940s, and served as the chairman of the Hyderabad Cricket Association. His son Naushir Mehta also played first-class cricket.

== See also ==
- List of Hyderabad cricketers
