= P. R. Ashokanand =

Indian cricketer (born 1940)

Personal information
- Born: 27 November 1940 (age 85); Tumkur, India
- Source: ESPNcricinfo, 17 April 2016

Poll Ramchandrarao Ashokanand (born 27 November 1940) is an Indian former cricketer. He played first-class cricket for Hyderabad, Madras and Mysore between 1957 and 1972.

== See also ==
- List of Hyderabad cricketers
