= C. S. Sureshkumar =

Indian former first-class cricketer (born 1959)

Personal information
- Born: 6 October 1959 (age 67); Madras, Tamil Nadu, India
- Batting: Right-handed
- Role: Batsman

Domestic team information
- Years: Team
- 1982/83–1987/88: Tamil Nadu

Career statistics
Competition	First-class	List A
Matches	24	1
Runs scored	1,265	26
Batting average	33.33	26.00
100s/50s	6/1	1/0
Top score	162	26
Catches/stumpings	8/–	0/–
- Source: ESPNcricinfo, 7 February 2016

C. S. Sureshkumar (born 6 October 1959) is an Indian former first-class cricketer who played for Tamil Nadu. He became a cricket coach after retirement.

== Career ==
After representing India national under-19 cricket team in 1978–79, Sureshkumar made his first-class debut for Tamil Nadu three seasons later. He played as a right-handed top-order batsman and also represented South Zone and the Board President's XI. In his 24 first-class appearances, he made more than 1000 runs including six centuries and a solitary fifty. Five of those centuries came in his first nine Ranji Trophy matches from 1982–83 to 1983–84. His final first-class appearance came in the 1987–88 Ranji Trophy.

After his playing career, Sureshkumar took up cricket coaching. A Level C NCA qualified coach, he worked as the batting coach of the National Cricket Academy and a batting consultant to the Indian under-19 team. In June 2009, the Kerala Cricket Association appointed him as the head coach of Kerala cricket team ahead of the 2009–10 Ranji Trophy season. He runs a cricket academy in Chennai called "C. S. Suresh Kumar Cricket Academy" where first-class cricketers have trained. Dinesh Karthik, who was a leg spin bowler, became a wicket-keeper at the academy.
