= Komadur Padmanabhan =

Indian cricketer (born 1937)

Personal information
- Born: 13 November 1937 (age 88); Hyderabad, India
- Source: ESPNcricinfo, 23 April 2016

Komadur Padmanabhan (born 13 November 1937) is an Indian former cricketer. He played first-class cricket for Andhra and Hyderabad between 1957 and 1965.

== See also ==
- List of Hyderabad cricketers
