= Bharath Reddy (cricketer) =

Indian cricketer (born 1954)

Personal information
- Born: 12 November 1954 (age 72); Chennai, India
- Batting: Right-handed
- Role: Wicket-keeper

International information
- National side: India (1978–1981)
- Test debut (cap 144): 12 July 1979 v England
- Last Test: 30 August 1979 v England
- ODI debut (cap 27): 3 January 1978 v Pakistan
- Last ODI: 18 January 1981 v New Zealand

Career statistics
Competition	Test	ODI	FC	LA
Matches	4	3	95	18
Runs scored	38	11	1,743	120
Batting average	9.50	–	17.78	17.14
100s/50s	0/0	0/0	0/9	0/0
Top score	21	8*	88	36
Catches/stumpings	9/2	2/0	171/50	10/2
- Source: ESPNcricinfo, 10 May 2020

Bharath Reddy (born 12 November 1954) is a former Indian international cricketer.

== Born ==
Bharat Reddy was born at 12 November 1954 in Chennai, Tamil Nadu, India. He was a wicket-keeper of team India for 4 test and 3 ODI.

== Cricket career ==
=== Tour of England ===
Reddy toured England with an Indian Schools XI in July and August 1973, scoring a century against a Midland Counties schools team. He made his first-class debut a few weeks later for Vazir Sultan Tobacco Colts XI at the age of 18, captaining a team of nine other first-class debutants. In quick succession he then kept wicket for Rest of India in the Irani Cup and for South Zone in the Duleep Trophy before making his Ranji Trophy debut for Tamil Nadu, all before the end of 1973. Before the 1973–74 season was out he had also played two first-class matches for an Indian XI against Rest of India, and made a short tour of Sri Lanka with an Indian team as the reserve wicket-keeper to Pochiah Krishnamurthy, playing in the match against Sri Lanka Board President's XI.

Neither Reddy nor Krishnamurthy succeeded Farokh Engineer when he retired from Test cricket shortly afterwards, however, the selectors preferring Syed Kirmani. Reddy kept wicket in one of the three matches India played against Sri Lanka in 1975–76, and as Kirmani's deputy he toured Australia in 1977–78 and Pakistan in 1978–79. He got his chance in Test cricket when Kirmani was dropped and Reddy toured England as the first-choice wicket-keeper in 1979. He played in all four Tests in a series that India lost one-nil, but was not impressive. Reddy toured Australia and New Zealand as Kirmani's deputy in 1980–81 without playing a Test.

=== International career ===
He played three One Day Internationals between 1978 and 1981, against Pakistan, Australia and New Zealand.

His best season with the bat was 1981–82, when he made 326 runs at 32.60 with three fifties, including his highest career score of 88 against Kerala.

He captained Tamil Nadu from 1982–83 to 1985–86. Against Kerala in 1982–83 he took six catches in the second innings and eight in the match.

== After cricket ==
After retiring from cricket, Reddy worked for Chemplast. He also helped to run cricket training camps in Chennai, where he discovered Indian Test players Dinesh Karthik and Lakshmipathy Balaji.

== Personal life ==
He is married to Gitanjali Reddy, with whom he has two daughters—Deepti and Sriya. The younger daughter, Sriya Reddy, is an actress.
