= Sports Coaching Foundation =

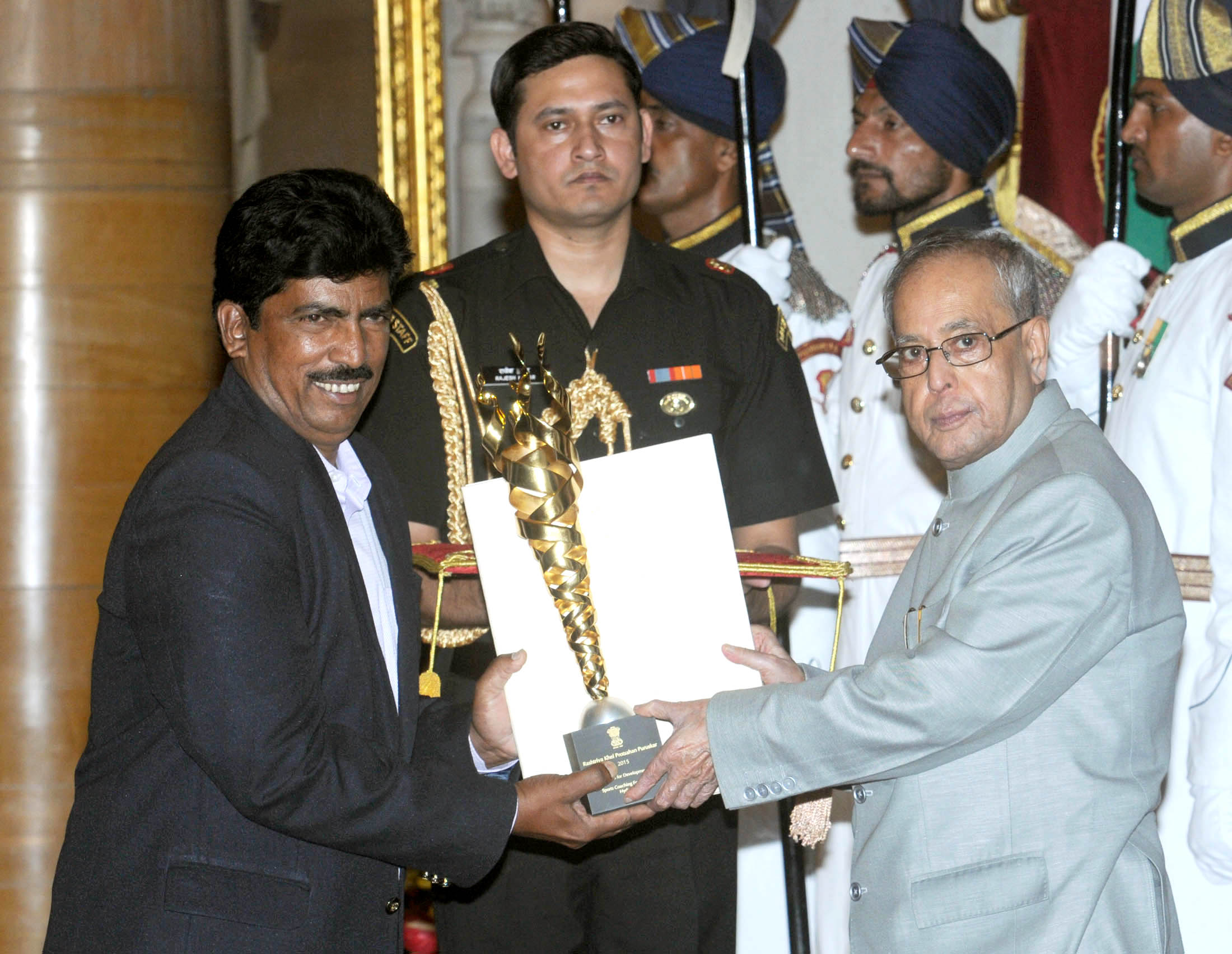
Pranab Mukherjee presenting the Rashtriya Khel Protsahan Puruskar for the year 2015 to the Sports Coaching Foundation, Hyderabad for contribution in the field of ‘Sports for Development’, in New Delhi.

Sports Coaching Foundation is an NGO in Hyderabad, Telangana state, India, founded in 1991 by ex-Andhra Ranji cricketer Kammela Saibaba.

In 2015 the group received the India NGO Award from the New York-based Rockefeller Foundation and the UK-based Resource Alliance, for its contribution to "social reconstruction through promoting sports amongst the under-privileged".
