= Prathamesh Gawas =

Indian cricketer (born 1994)

Personal information
- Full name: Prathamesh Chandrakant Gawas
- Born: 10 May 1994 (age 32); Mapusa, Goa, India
- Source: Cricinfo, 4 March 2017

Prathamesh Gawas (born 10 May 1994) is an Indian cricketer. He made his List A debut for Goa in the 2016–17 Vijay Hazare Trophy on 4 March 2017. He made his Twenty20 debut on 14 November 2019, for Goa in the 2019–20 Syed Mushtaq Ali Trophy.
