= Timmeri Kumar =

Indian cricketer (born 1992)

Personal information
- Full name: Timmeri Kuppu Ganesh Kumar
- Born: 22 October 1992 (age 33); Vijayawada, India
- Source: ESPNcricinfo, 2 February 2017

Timmeri Kumar (born 22 October 1992) is an Indian cricketer. He made his Twenty20 debut for Andhra Pradesh in the 2016–17 Inter State Twenty-20 Tournament on 2 February 2017.
