= Danthala Venkata Meher Baba =

Indian cricketer

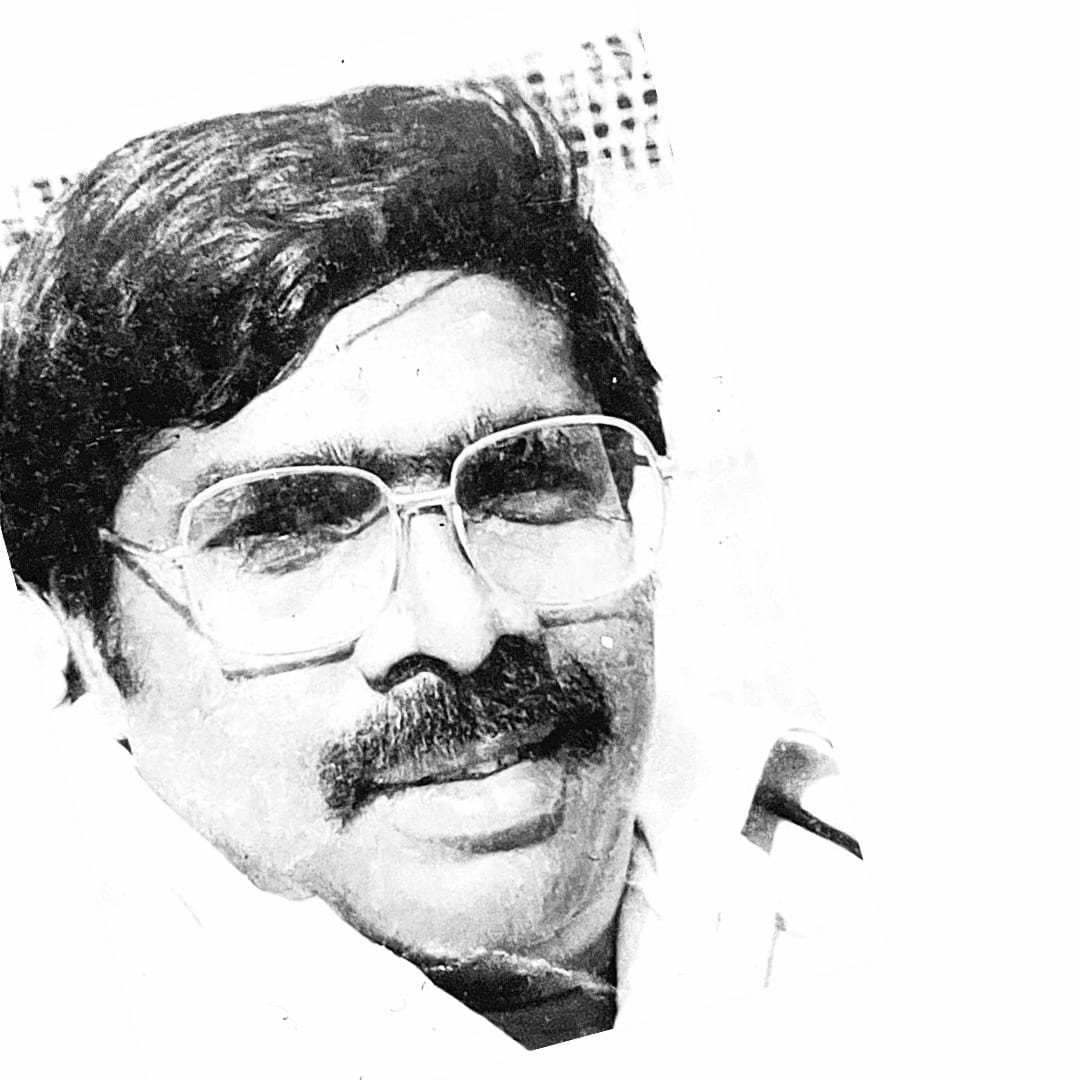

Personal information
- Born: 2 January 1950; Kakinada, Andhra Pradesh
- Died: 16 January 2008 (aged 58)
- Nickname: Meher
- Batting: Left-handed
- Bowling: Slow left-arm orthodox

Domestic team information
- Years: Team
- 1970–1987: Andhra
- 1970–1993: Andhra Bank Cricket Team
- 1975–1984: South Zone
- 1979: Hyderabad

Career statistics
Competition	FC
Matches	68
Runs scored	2,649
Batting average	24.08
100s/50s	1/20
Top score	134*
Balls bowled	9,633
Wickets	173
Bowling average	30.94
5 wickets in innings	5
10 wickets in match	0
Best bowling	5/32
Catches/stumpings	54/–
- Source: Cricinfo, 22 May 2022

Danthala Venkata Meher Baba (2 January 1950 – 16 January 2008) was an Indian cricketer who played for the Andhra cricket team in the Ranji Trophy, from 1971 to 1987, and also represented the Hyderabad Ranji Trophy Team in 1978. As a left-hand batsman and left-arm spinner, he had a first-class career spanning 17 years from 1970 to 1987. He scored 2649 runs, with his highest being 134 not out against Goa. Additionally, he scored 20 half-centuries and took 173 wickets with his slow left-arm orthodox bowling, with five for 32 being his best bowling figures. He achieved a total of five five-wicket hauls.

== Early years ==
Meher Baba was born on 2 January 1950 in Kakinada, East Godavari District, Andhra Pradesh in India, he was the only son of late Shri. Danthala Ramayya Naidu and late Smt. Danthala Padmamma. He was named after Avatar Meher Baba.

Venkata Meher started to play cricket at an age of 17, where he was selected to represent East Godavari District in the Junior State selection Championship in 1967 in Kakinada. He showed exceptional skill in his left arm orthodox spin bowling and left hand batting, his consistent performance in the Junior State Cricket Championship got him selected to represent the Andhra Ranji Trophy Team in 1971.

== Cricket career ==
Meher Baba made his debut against Mysore in January 1972 at Vijayawada. Meher Baba took his first wicket on 27 October 1972, against Kerala at Kurnool, this was his 4th first class match. Because of inconsistent debutant performances in the first 5 matches, Andhra's Captain B. Mahendra Kumar dropped Meher Baba from the playing 11, against Tamil Nadu in Madras on 3 December 1972. Andhra however lost this match by 105 runs.

Under a new captaincy of B. Ram Prasad, Meher Baba was brought back into the playing 11 the next season, on 3 November 1973 against Hyderabad on Kottagurem. Batting first Andhra were all out for a low score 51, in which Meher Baba stayed not out scoring 14 runs. He bowled an excellent spell of 15 overs taking 5 wickets for 32 runs, in which he tore apart the Hyderabad batting line up of K. Jayantilal, N. Mehta, Mumtaz Hussain, M. L. Jaisimha and Abdul Hai. He complete the season with 11 wickets in 4 matches. Meher Baba scored his debut 50 (59 run out) against Karnatake on 11 November 1974. Meher Baba played a match winning role in the second innings against Kerala at Guntur on 16 December 1974, where Meher took 3 wickets for 22 runs in 11.2 overs. This victory by 22 runs against Kerala on 16 December was the first ever for Andhra since his participation in the Ranji Trophy Championship. Andhra went on to win another nail biting match by just 1 run against Tamil Nadu at Salem on 6 January 1975.

Meher Baba went on to captain Andhra in two Ranji Trophy matches in the 1982–83 season and represented South Zone in the Duleep Trophy and Deodhar Trophy on eleven occasions. He was also part of the South Zone team which took on the visiting England team in 1981–82 and also played against the West Indies team in a three-day match held in Hyderabad during the team's tour during 1978–79.

The gutsy all-rounder of yesteryears, who rubbed shoulders with some of the big names of Indian cricket including G.R. Visvanath, E.A.S. Prasanna and Salim Durrani, was one of the probables of the Indian team for the 1980 New Zealand tour. Meher Baba was widely rated as one of the hardest hitters in domestic cricket.

== Family ==
Meher Baba's wife, Smt. Danthala Uma Maheshwari, is a close relative of Shri. C. K. Nayudu (the first captain of the Indian national cricket team). She is a retired Senior Section Officer of AP Secretariat and currently resides at their Sainikpuri residence. His son, Srikkanth, has represented both the Andhra Under-19 and South India Under-19 teams. His daughters, Archana and Padmaja Danthala, both represented Andhra Women's Cricket and played for Inter-State Women's Cricket Championships facilitated by Andhra Cricket Association and Women's Cricket Association of India.

== Education and job history ==
Meher Baba, dropped out of BDS from Government Medical College, Aurangabad, because of personal health issues and later pursued his BSc Agriculture from the Acharya N G Ranga Agricultural University, in Rajendranagar, Hyderabad. Meher Baba was offered a clerical job in Andhra Bank, with an agreement to be part of the first Andhra Bank cricket team, to participate in the prestigious Hyderabad Cricket Association's A division institutional cricket league. He formed a champion side along with famous cricketers like Abid Ali, Narsimha Rao (Babji), Vijay Paul, Bhasker Ram Murthy and Jyoti Prasad.

== Retirement ==
Meher baba played for Andhra Bank for 25 years and retired from the institutional cricket after 4 years of his first class cricket retirement in 1987. As a Zonal Manager, he took voluntary retirement from Andhra Bank in 2001. Meher Baba later worked for Jagruti Bank in Sainikpuri as a Chief Manager for 2 years and later resigned his post.

== BCCI selection committee ==
After his retirement from cricket, Meher Baba was appointed to be part of the Under-19 National Selection committee in 1989. He was notable for his selection of cricket greats like Rahul Dravid & VVS Laxman to represent the under-19 Indian cricket team. He was part of the committee from 1990 to 1996 and also served on the Andhra Cricket Association Selection Committee. He coached the Andhra Ranji team from 1999 to 2005 and also the coach for the Under-19 Andhra State team in 1998.

== Cricket coaching ==
Meher Baba played an active role as a cricket coach, he was appointed as the cricket coach from the Andhra Ranji Team from 1999-2005. He was also the coach for the Under-19 Andhra State team in 1998. Meher also was an active coach at the Aibara Cricket Camp in Secunderabad, Sports Coaching Foundation in Masab Tank, Cricket Academy in Sainikpuri as well as Women's coaching foundation in Maredpally.

== Felicitation ==
In 1992, BCCI honored Meher Baba with a benefit match, as a gesture of his contributions to India cricket. The benefit match was conducted between Gavaskar XI and Mohammad Azharuddin XI at Srikakulam. Andhra Cricket Association honored Meher Baba in 2007, at his home town in Rajamundry.

== Death ==
Meher Baba battled against Lung Cancer for 2 years, and died on 16 January 2008 at his residence in Sainikpuri, Secunderabad, AP. Statements of condolences for his death were made by the media, the Hyderabad Cricket Association as well the Andhra Cricket Association.

== Memorial cricket events ==
Since 2008, Telugu Association of Canada and Robin Singh Foundation conduct the annual "Danthala Meher Baba Cricket Trophy". In 2012, BCCI has named the Under-16 South Zone inter-state women's tournament as "Danthala Meher Baba Memorial Cricket Tournament".
