= Pawan Kumar (cricketer, born 1959) =

Indian cricketer (born 1959)

Personal information
- Born: 20 September 1959 (age 67); Hyderabad, India
- Source: Cricinfo, 18 April 2016

Pawan Kumar (born 20 September 1959) is an Indian former cricketer. He played two first-class matches for Hyderabad in 1984/85.

== See also ==
- List of Hyderabad cricketers
