= M. Jairam =

Indian cricketer (born 1937)

Personal information
- Born: 18 September 1937 (age 89); Madras, India
- Source: ESPNcricinfo, 17 April 2016

M. Jairam (born 18 September 1937) is an Indian former cricketer. He played first-class cricket for Andhra and Hyderabad between 1954 and 1971. Playing for Hyderabad, he took the most wickets in the 1964–65 Ranji Trophy, with 34 dismissals in the tournament.

== See also ==
- List of Hyderabad cricketers
