= Rangachari Madhavan =

Indian cricketer

Personal information
- Born: 29 October 1960 (age 66); Chennai, Tamil Nadu, India
- Batting: Left-handed
- Bowling: Slow left-arm orthodox
- Role: All-rounder

Domestic team information
- Years: Team
- 1982/83–1989/90: Tamil Nadu

Career statistics
Competition	FC	List A
Matches	39	5
Runs scored	1,781	58
Batting average	34.92	14.50
100s/50s	5/9	0/0
Top score	153*	21*
Balls bowled	1,351	72
Wickets	26	1
Bowling average	25.50	48.00
5 wickets in innings	1	0
10 wickets in match	0	n/a
Best bowling	5/32	1/37
Catches/stumpings	24/–	2/–
- Source: ESPNcricinfo, 17 May 2016

Rangachari Madhavan (born 29 October 1960) is an Indian former first-class cricketer who represented Tamil Nadu.

== Life and career ==
Born in Chennai, Madhavan played as an all-rounder who batted left-handed and bowled slow left-arm orthodox. He appeared in 39 first-class and 5 List A matches, before which he represented India Under-19s in Youth Tests. He also played for India Under-25s and South Zone during his career. He played his last first-class match in the 1989/90 season, aged 29.

Madhavan was a chartered accountant by profession. He lived in the Middle East for ten years and returned to Chennai in the mid-2000s. He was appointed member of the Under-19 selection committee of Tamil Nadu. He then became a member of the senior team selection committee, after which he became its chairman.
