= Naushir Mehta =

Indian cricketer

Personal information
- Born: 1947 or 1948 (age 77–78)
- Bowling: Right-arm off break
- Role: Bowler
- Relatives: Sorabji Mehta (father)

Domestic team information
- Years: Team
- 1967–1977: Hyderabad

Career statistics
Competition	First-class
Matches	57
Runs scored	786
Batting average	15.41
100s/50s	0/1
Top score	73
Balls bowled	10,444
Wickets	178
Bowling average	21.07
5 wickets in innings	11
10 wickets in match	1
Best bowling	6/16
Catches/stumpings	25/–
- Source: ESPNcricinfo, 15 February 2016

Naushir Mehta, also spelled as Noshir Mehta, is a former Indian first-class cricketer who played for Hyderabad as an off break bowler between 1967/68 and 1976/77. In 2014, he completed 50 years in his playing career.

== Career ==
Mehta started as a fast bowler before he switched to bowling right-arm off break. Having started playing cricket at the age of 16 in 1964 for Secunderabad Union Cricket Club, Mehta represented Hyderabad at the first-class level for ten seasons starting from 1967/68. His father Sorabji Mehta, who played first-class cricket for Hyderabad and Parsees in the 1930s and 1940s, was also the chairman of the Hyderabad Cricket Association (HCA).

Mehta and Mumtaz Hussain formed a successful spin pair for Hyderabad in the early 1970s. Mehta took 29 wickets at an average of 13.55 in the 1970–71 Ranji Trophy and 34 wickets at 16.55 in the 1971–72 Ranji Trophy including four five-wicket hauls and one ten-wicket haul. In the same season, he played for Rest of India against an Indian XI and took the wickets of Indian Test captain Ajit Wadekar, opener Ashok Mankad and Syed Abid Ali. He also played first-class cricket for Hyderabad Cricket Association XI and Andhra Chief Minister's XI, apart from South Zone, during his career.

Although Mehta played his last first-class match in the 1976/77 season, he continued to play the game in the local leagues. In November 2014, he completed 50 years in his playing career. At the time he was working as a spin bowling coach for the HCA Academy of Excellence. He also appeared in a brief role in the 2005 cricket-themed Bollywood film Iqbal.
