= Sanjiva Rao =

Indian cricketer (1917–1966)

Personal information
- Born: 1917
- Died: 6 August 1966 (aged 48–49); Hyderabad, India
- Source: ESPNcricinfo, 24 April 2016

Sanjiva Rao (1917 – 6 August 1966) was an Indian cricketer. He played sixteen first-class matches for Hyderabad between 1941 and 1958.

== See also ==
- List of Hyderabad cricketers
