= Vazir Sultan Tobacco cricket teams =

Indian cricket team

Vazir Sultan Tobacco Colts XI and Vazir Sultan Tobacco XI were two first-class cricket teams, sponsored by the Indian company Vazir Sultan Tobacco, that competed in the Moin-ud-Dowlah Gold Cup Tournament in the 1960s and 1970s.

== Vazir Sultan Tobacco Colts XI ==
Sunil Gavaskar, who made his first-class debut for the Vazir Sultan Tobacco Colts XI in 1966-67 at the age of 17, recalls that the team consisted of young cricketers "who were doing well at school and inter-university level. We used to have the odd first-class player, but generally it was a team of young players trying to make their mark in first-class cricket in India."

The team played their first match in 1964-65, under the captaincy of the Test captain at the time, the Nawab of Pataudi. He also captained the team in 1965-66 and 1966-67, when the team played one match each time. Pataudi scored three centuries: one in each match. In 1964-65 Ramnath Parkar made his first-class debut, in 1965-66 Eknath Solkar, and in 1966-67 Mohinder Amarnath, at 16, made his first-class debut alongside Gavaskar. All three matches were drawn, with Vazir Sultan Tobacco Colts XI conceding the first-innings lead.

In 1967-68, now captained by Ambar Roy, Vazir Sultan Tobacco Colts XI beat Hyderabad Cricket Association XI and Hyderabad Blues to proceed to the semi-final against State Bank of India, which ended with the scores level and State Bank of India 57 for 7. In 1968-69 they again reached the semi-final, this time losing a match outright for the first time, to State Bank of India; Dilip Doshi was among those making their first-class debuts.

Srinivasaraghavan Venkataraghavan captained a side of nine first-class debutants in 1969-70, and Bharath Reddy, aged 18 and making his own first-class debut, captained a side of ten first-class debutants in 1973-74. However, apart from Reddy himself, none of these debutants went on to play Test cricket.

In all, Vazir Sultan Tobacco Colts XI played 10 first-class matches, winning two, losing two, and drawing six.

== Vazir Sultan Tobacco XI ==
In contrast to the emphasis on youth of the Colts XI, when the Vazir Sultan Tobacco XI played their first matches in 1970-71 their team included seven Test players, of whom Salim Durani, Vijay Manjrekar and Chandu Borde were in their late thirties. The selection policy changed slightly in 1971-72, when three players made their first-class debuts under the captaincy of Venkataraghavan.

They won their first match, against Mafatlal Sports Club, and drew their other four matches between 1970-71 and 1972-73.

== Other teams ==
Vazir Sultan Tobacco has sometimes sponsored teams in the Moin-ud-Dowlah Gold Cup Tournament since the tournament lost its first-class status after the 1973-74 season, as well as in other non-first-class competitions.
