= P. R. Shyamsunder =

Indian cricketer (1924–1988)

Personal information
- Full name: Poll Ramchandrarao Shyamsunder
- Born: 3 March 1924; Tumkur, India
- Died: 15 May 1988 (aged 64); Bangalore, India
- Source: ESPNcricinfo, 24 April 2016

Poll Ramchandrarao "P.R." Shyamsunder (3 March 1924 – 15 May 1988) was an Indian cricketer. He played first-class cricket for Hyderabad, Madras and Mysore between 1944 and 1958.

== See also ==
- List of Hyderabad cricketers
