= Pawan Kumar (cricketer, born 1972) =

Indian cricketer (born 1972)

Personal information
- Full name: Vallarapu Pawan Kumar
- Born: 28 October 1972 (age 54); Hyderabad, India
- Source: Cricinfo, 18 April 2016

Pawan Kumar (born 28 October 1972) is an Indian former cricketer. He played two first-class matches for Hyderabad in 1995/96.

== See also ==
- List of Hyderabad cricketers
