= All Saints High School (Hyderabad) =

All Saint's High School
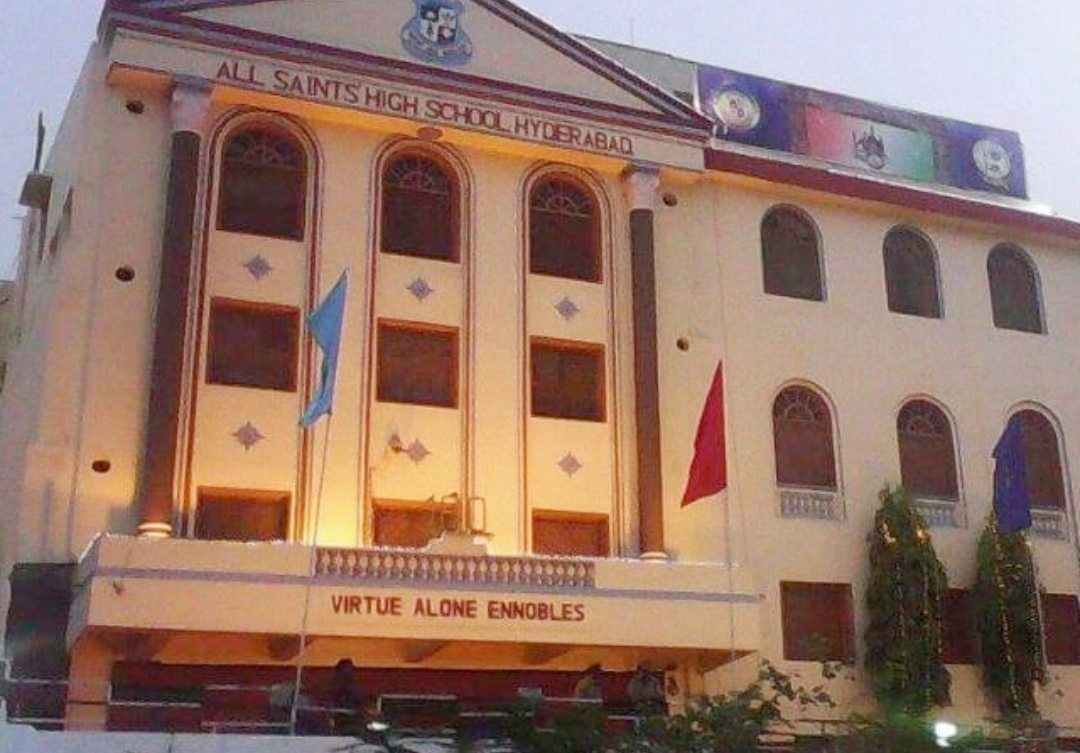
- All Saints High School, Hyderabad
- Hyderabad, Telangana; India

Information
- Type: Minority Institution
- Motto: Latin: Virtus Sola Nobilitat; English: 'Virtue Alone Ennobles'
- Established: 1855; 171 years ago
- Headmaster: Rev. Bro. Vincent Mendonza
- Website: <https://allsaintshyd.edu.in/><1>

All Saints High School is a Roman Catholic school established in 1855 in Hyderabad, India. It teaches students from lower kindergarten to 10th grade.

== History ==
The history of All Saints High School dates back to 1855 when Rt. Rev. Daniel Murphy, the Vicar Apostolic of Hyderabad founded it at the request of the then-Nizam of Hyderabad, Fourth Asaf Nasirud Dowla Bahadur. Rt. Rev. Mgr. Caproti was appointed as its first rector in 1858.In 1932, the school was handed over to the Montfort Brothers of St. Gabriel.

At the invitation of Bishop Vismara of Hyderabad and on the insistence of Pope Pius IX, the Montfort Brothers of St. Gabriel took charge of the management of the school in 1932 with Rev. Bro. Rosius as its first Brother Rector. In 1933, Rev. Bro. M. Paul, an administrator, took over as the first Indian rector and developed All Saints as one of the best secondary schools in academics and infrastructure in the Nizam's dominion. With Independence in 1947, there came one of the school's most revered and well-known rectors, Rev. Bro. John of God.

Due to inadequate accommodation, growing demands for admission, and to mark the Centenary Year of the Institution, four schools were branched out between 1953 and 1955, viz., St. Peter’s High School (housing the present primary sections),St. Mark’s Boys Town High School, Hyderabad, Little Flower High School, Hyderabad, St. Paul’s High School. All Saints’ was an exclusively boys school until 1996 when it became co-educational. In 2011-2012, the kindergarten was renamed the All Saints’ Preparatory School.

In 2018, a minor fire broke out at the school campus. Seven children were admitted to the hospital due to breathing problems, but discharged the same day. There were no injuries or deaths.

== Notable alumni ==
Name	Notability	References
Arshad Ayub	cricketer	
M. V. Sridhar	cricketer	
B. Sumeeth Reddy	badminton player	
Khlid Qayyum	cricketer	
M. V. Sridhar	cricketer	
Mohammed Azharuddin	cricketer and politician	
Mohammed Irfan	singer	
Noel David	cricketer	
Sandeep Goud	cricketer	
Sitaram Yechury	politician	
Sultan Saleem	cricketer	
Venkatapathy Raju	cricketer	
Utsav Sonkar	Head Artist	
