= Chirag Parmar =

Indian cricketer (born 1990)

Personal information
- Born: 25 December 1990 (age 35); Rajkot, India
- Source: ESPNcricinfo, 4 February 2017

Chirag Parmar (born 25 December 1990) is an Indian cricketer. He made his Twenty20 debut for Gujarat in the 2016–17 Inter State Twenty-20 Tournament on 4 February 2017. He made his List A debut for Gujarat in the 2016–17 Vijay Hazare Trophy on 25 February 2017.
