= Mumtaz Hussain (cricketer) =

Indian cricketer (1947–2000)

Personal information
- Born: 1947
- Died: 5 May 2000 (aged 52–53)
- Source: ESPNcricinfo, 17 April 2016

Mumtaz Hussain (1947 – 5 May 2000) was an Indian cricketer. He played 69 first-class matches for Hyderabad between 1966 and 1978.

He played for Osmania University and was part of the university team when it won the Rohinton Baria Trophy in 1966–67.

== See also ==
- List of Hyderabad cricketers
