= Manoj Sai =

Indian cricketer (born 1982)

Personal information
- Full name: Vemula Manoj Sai
- Born: 25 September 1982 (age 43); Guntur, Andhra Pradesh
- Batting: Right-handed
- Role: Wicket-keeper

Domestic team information
- Years: Team
- 2004-2013: Andhra Pradesh.
- Source: ESPNcricinfo, 24 April 2016

Vemula Manoj Sai (born 10 October 1982) is an Indian cricketer who played for Andhra Pradesh. He is right-hand wicket-keeper batsman. He was born at Guntur.
