= Pawan Kumar (cricketer, born 1970) =

Indian cricketer (born 1970)

Personal information
- Full name: Tangirala Pawan Kumar
- Born: 19 September 1970 (age 56); Eluru, India

Domestic team information
- Years: Team
- 1993-2002: Hyderabad

Career statistics
Competition	FC	LA
Matches	2	19
Runs scored	30	112
Batting average	10.00	10.18
100s/50s	0/0	0/0
Top score	24	23
Balls bowled	228	864
Wickets	1	28
Bowling average	129.00	25.75
5 wickets in innings	0	1
10 wickets in match	0	0
Best bowling	1/38	5/43
Catches/stumpings	1/0	8/0
- Source: Cricinfo, 22 August 2018

Pawan Kumar (born 19 September 1970) is an Indian former cricketer. He played first-class cricket for Andhra and Hyderabad in 1993/94.

== See also ==
- List of Hyderabad cricketers
