= S. K. Kamaruddin =

Indian cricketer (born 1992)

Personal information
- Born: 25 July 1992 (age 34)
- Source: Cricinfo, 6 March 2017

S. K. Kamaruddin (born 25 July 1992) is an Indian cricketer. He made his List A debut for Andhra in the 2016–17 Vijay Hazare Trophy on 6 March 2017.
