= M. V. Sridhar =

Indian cricketer (1966–2017)

Personal information
- Full name: Maturi Venkat Sridhar
- Born: 2 August 1966; Vijayawada, Andhra Pradesh
- Died: 30 October 2017 (aged 51)
- Batting: Right-handed
- Bowling: Right-arm off break

Domestic team information
- Years: Team
- 1988/89–1999/00: Hyderabad

Career statistics
Competition	First-class	List A
Matches	97	35
Runs scored	6,701	930
Batting average	48.91	29.06
100s/50s	21/27	0/5
Top score	366	78*
Balls bowled	27	16
Wickets	0	1
Bowling average	–	14.00
5 wickets in innings	–	0
10 wickets in match	–	0
Best bowling	–	1/8
Catches/stumpings	87/–	10/–
- Source: ESPNcricinfo, 1 September 2019

Maturi Venkat Sridhar (2 August 1966 – 30 October 2017) was an Indian first-class cricketer. He represented Hyderabad between 1988/89 and 1999/00, making 6701 runs at 48.91 with 21 hundreds. His highest score of 366 was the cornerstone for Hyderabad when they posted the record breaking total of 944/6 (declared) against Andhra in the 1993–94 Ranji Trophy; Noel David and Vivek Jaisimha scored double centuries. While Sridhar was batting, 850 runs were scored - the most runs added during a batsman's innings in first-class history. He was the secretary of MVSR Engineering College in Hyderabad.

== Early life and education ==
He studied at the All Saints High School and Osmania Medical College.

== Death ==
On 30 October 2017, Sridhar suffered a heart attack at his home. He was declared dead upon arrival at the hospital. He is survived by his wife, a son and a daughter.
