= Siva Charan Singh =

Indian cricketer (born 1993)

Personal information
- Full name: Siva Charan Singh
- Born: 29 November 1993 (age 32)
- Batting: Right-handed
- Role: Wicketkeeper

Domestic team information
- Years: Team
- 2016–17: Andhra
- Source: Cricinfo, 3 March 2017

Siva Charan Singh (born 29 November 1993) is an Indian cricketer. He made his List A debut for Andhra in the 2016–17 Vijay Hazare Trophy on 3 March 2017. He made his first-class debut for Andhra in the 2018–19 Ranji Trophy on 12 November 2018.
