= Mahendra Kumar (cricketer) =

Indian cricketer (born 1939)

Personal information
- Full name: Bezwada Mahendra Kumar
- Born: 16 August 1939 (age 87); Vijayawada, India
- Source: ESPNcricinfo, 17 April 2016

Mahendra Kumar (born 16 August 1939) is an Indian former cricketer. He played first-class cricket for Andhra and Hyderabad between 1960 and 1973.

== See also ==
- List of Hyderabad cricketers
