= Youraj Singh =

Indian cricketer (born 1968)

Personal information
- Full name: Youraj Singh
- Born: 9 April 1968 (age 58); Hyderabad, Andhra Pradesh
- Batting: Right-handed
- Role: Wicket-keeper

Domestic team information
- Years: Team
- 1992/93-1999/00: Hyderabad
- Source: Cricinfo, 2 November 2015

Youraj Singh (born 9 April 1968) is former Indian cricketer who played for Hyderabad cricket team from 1992/93 to 1999/00 in 64 first-class and 25 List A matches. He was born at Hyderabad.

He was a wicket-keeper who was able to bat in lower order with batting average of 15.94 in first-class and 24.18 in List A matches.
