= Abey Kuruvilla =

Indian cricketer (born 1968)

Personal information
- Born: 4 August 1968 (age 58); Mannar, Alappuzha, Kerala, India
- Height: 6 ft 5 in (196 cm)
- Batting: Right-handed
- Bowling: Right-arm fast-medium

Career statistics
Competition	Test	ODI
Matches	10	25
Runs scored	66	26
Batting average	6.60	3.71
100s/50s	0/0	0/0
Top score	35*	7
Balls bowled	1,765	1,131
Wickets	25	25
Bowling average	35.68	35.60
5 wickets in innings	1	0
10 wickets in match	0	0
Best bowling	5/68	4/43
Catches/stumpings	0/–	4/–
Medal record
Men's Cricket
Representing India
ACC Asia Cup
Runner-up	1997 Sri Lanka
- Source: ESPNcricinfo, 4 February 2006

Abey Kuruvilla (born 4 August 1968) is an Indian former cricketer and general manager of Board of Control for Cricket in India (BCCI). He played as a bowler in mid-1990s for Indian cricket team. He was a selector of BCCI.

During his career, Kuruvilla was notable for his 6 ft 5 in (1.96 m) height and broad frame. He grew up in Chembur, Mumbai. He retired from all forms of cricket in 2000, and has taken up coaching.

In his brief international career, Kuruvilla played in thirty-five international matches, ten Tests and twenty-five One Day Internationals, all in the same calendar year.

== Career ==
Kuruvilla lead the pace attack on the tour of the West Indies in 1997, when Javagal Srinath was sidelined with a rotator cuff injury. While he returned adequate figures from that tour, and bowled decently in subsequent Test matches on flatter pitches, he was dropped from the team. He announced his retirement from first-class cricket in April 2000 during the quarter-final of the Ranji Trophy, at 31, reasoning that he "had decided [to retire] at the beginning of the season itself that this would be [his] last season. He added, "A lot of young boys are coming up and I have to make room for them, there is no specific reason."

== After cricket ==
On 27 September 2012, Kuruvilla was appointed as the national selector from the BCCI. He was appointed as talent scout for Mumbai Indians.

He was the main reason behind selection of Pravin Tambe in Rajasthan Royals IPL team. On 24 December 2020, Kuruvilla was appointed as the national selector of the Indian Cricket Team. He has been associated with DY Patil group Navi Mumbai since 2009. On 10 February 2022, Kuruvilla quit his selection committee post as he completed his five years tenure with the board.

Currently he is the General Manager of Indian Cricket Team the, Board Of Control For Cricket In India (BCCI).
