= V. Chamundeswaranath =

Indian former first-class cricketer

Personal information
- Full name: Vankina Chamundeswaranath
- Born: 25 June 1959 (age 67); Rajahmundry, Andhra Pradesh, India
- Nickname: Chamundi
- Batting: Right-handed
- Bowling: Right-arm off break, Right-arm medium
- Role: Batsman

Domestic team information
- Years: Team
- 1978/79–1991/92: Andhra

Career statistics
Competition	FC	List A
Matches	44	4
Runs scored	1,818	39
Batting average	26.34	39.00
100s/50s	4/8	0/0
Top score	154	25*
Balls bowled	480	–
Wickets	5	–
Bowling average	66.00	–
5 wickets in innings	0	–
10 wickets in match	0	n/a
Best bowling	1/5	–
Catches/stumpings	14/–	1/–
- Source: ESPNcricinfo, 22 February 2016

Vankina Chamundeswaranath (born 25 June 1959) is an Indian former first-class cricketer who played for Andhra between 1978/79 and 1991/92. Also a businessman, he is a co-owner of the Indian Badminton League franchise Mumbai Masters.

== Life and career ==
A right-handed middle-order batsman from Rajahmundry, Chamundeswaranath represented Andhra for 14 seasons after making his first-class debut at the age of 19. He played 44 first-class matches and scored 1818 runs at an average of 26.34. He was the captain of Andhra for 13 matches between 1988/89 and 1990/91. He played for Wills XI in 1988/89 and South Zone in 1989/90.

Chamundeswaranath was elected as the chairman of the Andhra Cricket Association (ACA) selection committee in 2007. He was also the secretary of ACA, and selector of Andhra under-19 and women's teams. He worked as the Indian team manager for the 2009 ICC World Twenty20 but was suspended at the conclusion of the tournament in June 2009 for allegedly harassing Andhra women cricketers for sexual favors. In August 2009, ACA sacked him after allegations of corruption in team selection. Andhra woman cricketer Durga Bhavani, who committed suicide in 2015, had filed a complaint against Chamundeswaranath alleging sexual harassment in 2009 before withdrawing the complaint and retiring from cricket.

In July 2013, Chamundeswaranath became a co-owner of the Indian Badminton League franchise Mumbai Masters, in partnership with former India cricketer Sunil Gavaskar and actor Nagarjuna.
