= Vijay Mohanraj =

Indian former first-class cricketer (born 1955)

Personal information
- Born: 9 September 1955 (age 71); Bombay, Maharashtra, India
- Batting: Left-handed
- Role: Batsman; occasional wicket-keeper

Domestic team information
- Years: Team
- 1975/76–1977/78: Bombay
- 1979/80–1987/88: Hyderabad

Career statistics
Competition	FC	List A
Matches	54	1
Runs scored	3,302	5
Batting average	45.86	5.00
100s/50s	6/19	0/0
Top score	211*	5
Balls bowled	101	–
Wickets	4	–
Bowling average	12.25	–
5 wickets in innings	0	–
10 wickets in match	0	n/a
Best bowling	1/0	–
Catches/stumpings	21/1	0/–
- Source: ESPNcricinfo, 14 January 2016

Vijay Mohanraj (born 9 September 1955) is an Indian former first-class cricketer who played for Bombay and Hyderabad. After his playing career, he became a coach and selector for Hyderabad.

== Life and career ==
Born on 9 September 1955 in Bombay, Mohanraj was a prolific left-handed top-order batsman for Bombay, Hyderabad and South Zone. He appeared in 54 first-class matches and one List A game in a career that spanned between 1975/76 and 1987/88. He was a member of the Bombay team that won the 1976–77 Ranji Trophy and the Hyderabad team that won the 1986–87 Ranji Trophy. He scored his personal best 211 not out in the 1986–87 Ranji final against Delhi and was the fourth-highest run-scorer of the tournament with 751 runs averaging 75.10.

After retirement, Mohanraj became a coach and a selector for Hyderabad Cricket Association (HCA). A qualified cricket coach for the National Cricket Academy, he worked as a manager for the Deccan Chargers during the 2008 Indian Premier League. He is also the secretary of the Veterans Cricket Association of HCA.

Mohanraj is the managing director of Uniglobe Sameera Travels, an associate of Uniglobe Travels.
