= Syed Shahabuddin (cricketer) =

Indian cricketer (born 1979)

Personal information
- Born: 1 July 1979 (age 47); Kadiri, India
- Source: ESPNcricinfo, 21 October 2015

Syed Shahabuddin (born 1 July 1979) is an Indian first class cricketer who played for Andhra Pradesh.
