= Maheshwar Singh (cricketer) =

Indian cricketer (born 1946)

Personal information
- Born: 1 January 1946 (age 80); Hyderabad, India
- Source: ESPNcricinfo, 20 April 2016

Maheshwar Singh (born 1 January 1946) is an Indian former cricketer. He played first-class cricket for Andhra and Hyderabad between 1969 and 1978.

== See also ==
- List of Hyderabad cricketers
