= Syed Abid Ali =

Indian cricketer (1941–2025)

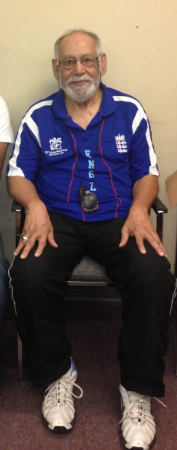
- Abid Ali, 2013

Personal information
- Born: 9 September 1941; Hyderabad, Hyderabad State, British Raj
- Died: 12 March 2025 (aged 83); United States
- Batting: Right-handed
- Bowling: Right-arm medium-fast
- Role: All-rounder

International information
- National side: India
- Test debut (cap 116): 23 December 1967 v Australia
- Last Test: 15 December 1974 v West Indies
- ODI debut (cap 1): 13 July 1974 v England
- Last ODI: 14 June 1975 v New Zealand

Domestic team information
- Years: Team
- 1959/60–1978/79: Hyderabad

Career statistics
Competition	Test	ODI	FC	LA
Matches	29	5	212	12
Runs scored	1,018	93	8,732	169
Batting average	20.36	31.00	29.30	28.16
100s/50s	0/6	0/1	13/41	0/1
Top score	81	70	173*	70
Balls bowled	4,164	336	25,749	783
Wickets	47	7	397	19
Bowling average	42.12	26.71	28.55	19.31
5 wickets in innings	1	0	14	0
10 wickets in match	0	0	0	0
Best bowling	6/55	2/22	6/23	3/20
Catches/stumpings	32/–	0/–	190/5	5/–
- Source: CricketArchive, 30 September 2008

Syed Abid Ali (9 September 1941 – 12 March 2025) was an all-rounder Indian cricketer who was a lower-order batsman and a medium-pace bowler. He played an important role in Indian cricket in the 1960s and '70s.

== Early life ==
Abid Ali attended St. George's Grammar School and All Saints High School in Hyderabad. In 1956, he was picked to play for Hyderabad Schools by the selectors, who were impressed by his fielding. He scored 82 against Kerala and won the best fielder's prize. A few years later, when the State Bank of Hyderabad formed a cricket team, he was given a job there. He started off as a wicket keeper before becoming a bowler.

== Playing career ==
Abid made it to the Hyderabad junior side in 1958–59 and the state Ranji Trophy team in the next year. He hardly bowled in the first few years and did not score his first Ranji hundred till 1967. He was unexpectedly picked for the Indian team that toured Australia and New Zealand that year.

He made it to the team for the first Test against Australia possibly in the place of the captain, M. A. K. Pataudi, who dropped out injured. Abid scored 33 runs in both innings and took 6 wickets for 55, the best by an Indian on debut at that point. Sent in to open the batting in the third Test, he hit 47. This was followed by innings of 81 and 78 in the final Test.

Abid was the non-striker when Sunil Gavaskar scored the winning runs against the West Indies in the Port of Spain Test of 1971. When West Indies tried to chase a difficult target in the final Test of the series, Abid bowled Rohan Kanhai and Garry Sobers off consecutive balls. A few months later, he hit the winning boundary when India defeated England by four wickets at the Oval.

In the Manchester Test of the same series, he took the first four wickets for 19 runs before lunch on the first day to reduce England to 4 for 41.

He played nine more Test matches, and scored 70 runs against New Zealand in the 1975 World Cup. Abid continued to play first class cricket for four more years. He scored more than 2,000 runs and took over a hundred wickets for Hyderabad in the Ranji Trophy. His highest individual score was 173 not out against Kerala in 1968-69 and his best bowling was 6 for 23 against Surrey at the Oval in 1974.

== Coaching career ==
Abid coached the junior team of Hyderabad for a few years, before moving to California in 1980. He coached the Maldives in late 1990s and the UAE between 2002 and 2005. Before coaching the UAE, he trained the Andhra team that won the South Zone league in Ranji Trophy in 2001–02. Abid resided in California in his later years. He coached promising youngsters at the Stanford Cricket Academy before retiring.

== Personal life and death ==
Obituaries for Abid Ali appeared in the media in the early 1990s when he had in fact survived a heart bypass surgery. His death was mistakenly announced on the air by Indian former cricketer Farokh Engineer.

Abid Ali had two children, a daughter and a son. Later in life, he resided in the United States, where he died on 12 March 2025, at the age of 83.

== See also ==
- List of India cricketers who have taken five-wicket hauls on Test debut

== Bibliography ==
- Sujit Mukherjee, Matched winners, Orient Longman (1996), p 76–90
- Christopher Martin-Jenkins, Who's Who of Test Cricketers
