= Kenia Jayantilal =

Indian cricketer (born 1948)

Personal information
- Full name: Hirji Kenia Jayantilal
- Born: 13 January 1948; Hyderabad, India (now in Telangana)
- Batting: Right-handed
- Bowling: Right-arm off-break

International information
- National side: India
- Only Test (cap 126): 18 February 1971 v West Indies

Domestic team information
- Years: Team
- 1967–1979: Hyderabad

Career statistics
Competition	Test	First-class
Matches	1	91
Runs scored	5	4,687
Batting average	5.00	36.33
100s/50s	0/0	8/22
Top score	5	197
Balls bowled	–	606
Wickets	–	6
Bowling average	–	51.83
5 wickets in innings	–	0
10 wickets in match	–	0
Best bowling	–	3/47
Catches/stumpings	0/–	66/–
- Source: ESPNcricinfo, 1 October 2019

Hirji Kenia Jayantilal (born 13 January 1948) is a former Indian cricketer who played in one Test match in 1971.

He played for Osmania University and was part of the university team when it won the Rohinton Baria Trophy in 1966–67.

On his Ranji Trophy debut, he scored 153 runs against Andhra.

He only played one Test match in 1971 against West Indies, where he scored five runs. He was a substitute for Sunil Gavaskar as the latter was injured.
