= Noel David =

Indian cricketer (born 1971)

Noel Arthur David
Cricket information
- Batting: Right-handed
- Bowling: Right-arm off break

International information
- National side: India
- ODI debut (cap 104): 27 April 1997 v West Indies
- Last ODI: 18 July 1997 v Sri Lanka

Domestic team information
- Years: Team
- 1992/93–2001/02: Hyderabad

Career statistics
Competition	ODI	FC	LA
Matches	4	35	48
Runs scored	9	1,379	664
Batting average	–	29.97	20.75
100s/50s	0/0	2/8	1/2
Top score	8*	207*	120
Balls bowled	32	3,483	2,193
Wickets	4	51	36
Bowling average	33.35	27.66	43.50
5 wickets in innings	0	0	0
10 wickets in match	0	0	0
Best bowling	3/21	4/26	3/21
Catches/stumpings	0/–	12/–	18/–
Medal record
Men's Cricket
Representing India
ACC Asia Cup
Runner-up	1997 Sri Lanka
- Source: ESPNcricinfo, 6 March 2006

Noel Arthur David (born 26 February 1971) is a former Indian cricketer. He played domestic cricket for Hyderabad and played four One Day Internationals for India in 1997.

== Early life ==
When he was five years old, his family moved to Hyderabad from Puducherry. Still, one of his siblings (elder brother) is living in Puducherry. He attended All Saints High School which has produced test players like Abid Ali, Syed Kirmani, Mohammad Azharuddin and Venkatapathy Raju. Already a 100-metre and 200 metre athlete, his fielding developed under coach Sampath Kumar.

== Career ==
David was a bowling all-rounder - a decent off-break bowler and a lower-order batsman. He was an excellent fielder. David scored a double-century in just his second game as part of Hyderabad's record 944.

Sachin Tendulkar is believed to have asked "Noel who?" when he learned that David was the replacement for the injured Javagal Srinath during India's 1997 tour of West Indies. David in a later interview clarified Sachin never said that statement, and it was Ajit Wadekar who did.

On the other hand, former BCCI secretary Jaywant Lele confirmed there was something fishy about the selection of the unheard-of David.

Sunil Gavaskar once said that he was the greatest ever fielder for Indian cricket team; along with Caribbean commentator Tony Cozier, Gavaskar compared David with Jonty Rhodes.

== Post-retirement ==
As of 2019, David is chief selector for Hyderabad as well as chairman of the Junior Selection Committee. David has an ambition to become the coach of the Hyderabad team.
