= R. A. Swaroop =

Indian cricketer

Personal information
- Full name: Rayapeth Arjun Swaroop
- Born: 20 August 1965 (age 61); Secunderabad, Andhra Pradesh, India
- Height: 5 ft 11 in (1.80 m)
- Batting: Right-handed
- Bowling: Right-arm off break
- Role: All-rounder

Domestic team information
- Years: Team
- 1987/88–1994/95: Hyderabad
- 1995/96–2000/01: Baroda

Career statistics
Competition	FC	List A
Matches	69	32
Runs scored	3,475	710
Batting average	35.45	27.30
100s/50s	7/18	0/4
Top score	165	79
Balls bowled	10,061	1,409
Wickets	132	33
Bowling average	29.65	26.66
5 wickets in innings	6	0
10 wickets in match	1	n/a
Best bowling	6/121	4/37
Catches/stumpings	56/–	9/–
- Source: ESPNcricinfo, 20 March 2016

Rayapeth Arjun Swaroop (born 20 August 1965), commonly known as R. A. Swaroop, is an Indian former first-class cricketer who represented Hyderabad and Baroda. He later worked as a selector for Hyderabad.

== Career ==
As an all-rounder who batted right-handed and bowled off spin, Swaroop made his debut for Hyderabad in the 1987/88 season and played for the team till the 1994/95 season. He then switched to Baroda the following season and represented it for six years. Swaroop also appeared for South Zone, West Zone and Board President's XI during his career. In his 69 first-class appearances, he scored 3475 runs at an average of 35.45 and took 132 wickets at 29.65. He also made 700-plus runs, while taking more than 30 wickets, in his List A career.

After his playing career, Swaroop worked as a member of the senior team selection team selection panel of the Hyderabad Cricket Association.

== Personal life ==
Born in Secunderabad, Swaroop studied at the Hyderabad Public School in Begumpet in the 1970s. He captained the school cricket team that also featured Satya Nadella, who played as an off spinner. Swaroop has also worked as an ILFS general manager.
