= Pochiah Krishnamurthy =

Indian cricketer (1947–1999)

Personal information
- Full name: Pallemoni Krishnamurthy
- Born: 12 July 1947; Hyderabad, British India
- Died: 28 January 1999 (aged 51); Hyderabad, Andhra Pradesh, India
- Batting: Right-handed
- Bowling: Legbreak
- Role: Wicket-keeper

International information
- National side: India
- Test debut (cap 127): 18 February 1971 v West Indies
- Last Test: 13 April 1971 v West Indies
- Only ODI (cap 21): 22 February 1976 v New Zealand

Career statistics
Competition	Test	ODI	FC	LA
Matches	5	1	108	4
Runs scored	33	6	1,558	44
Batting average	5.50	6.00	14.98	14.66
100s/50s	0/0	0/0	0/8	0/0
Top score	20	6	82	22
Catches/stumpings	7/1	1/1	150/68	2/2
- Source: , 13 March 2014

Pallemoni Krishnamurthy, also known as Pochiah Krishnamurthy, (12 July 1947 – 28 January 1999) was an Indian cricketer who played in five Test matches in 1971 against West Indies and one One Day International in 1976 against New Zealand.

He toured England in 1971 as Farokh Engineer's backup, and New Zealand and West Indies in 1976 as Kirmani's deputy. He played first class cricket for Hyderabad for most of the 1970s, after making his debut in 1967. He batted at all 11 slots in Ranji Trophy. He is also the only batsman to be associated in a century partnership batting as number 1 and as number 11. He worked for State Bank of India and was part of their star studded side in local cricket.
