= Rajesh Yadav (cricketer) =

Personal information
- Full name: Nandlal Rajesh Yadav
- Born: 20 February 1965 (age 61); Hyderabad, Andhra Pradesh, India
- Batting: Right-handed
- Bowling: Right-arm medium-fast
- Role: Bowler
- Relatives: Shivlal Yadav (brother), Arjun Yadav (nephew)

Domestic team information
- Years: Team
- 1984/85–1993/94: Hyderabad

Career statistics
Competition	FC	List A
Matches	60	6
Runs scored	997	45
Batting average	18.12	9.00
100s/50s	0/7	0/0
Top score	75*	24
Balls bowled	7,634	204
Wickets	159	4
Bowling average	30.20	41.25
5 wickets in innings	7	0
10 wickets in match	2	n/a
Best bowling	7/58	2/36
Catches/stumpings	15/–	1/–
- Source: ESPNcricinfo, 27 February 2016

Nandlal Rajesh Yadav (born 20 February 1965) is an Indian former first-class cricketer who represented Hyderabad cricket team. He became a cricket coach after his playing career.

== Career ==
As a right-arm medium-fast bowler, Yadav appeared in 60 first-class and 6 List A matches. His career lasted 10 seasons, starting from 1984/85, during which he represented Hyderabad, South Zone and Wills XI. He made his first-class debut at the age of 19 in December 1984 against Andhra and picked 4/65 and 7/64 in that match. He was part of the Hyderabad team that won the 1986–87 Ranji Trophy, their second Ranji title. He took a five-wicket haul against Delhi in the final which Hyderabad won on first innings lead. He played for Wills XI in the Wills Trophy later that season and was named in the probables for the 1987 Cricket World Cup. Yadav finished his first-class career in December 1993 with 159 wickets at an average of 30.20, including seven five-wicket hauls and two ten-wicket hauls.

Yadav became a cricket coach after retirement. He worked as the head coach of Hyderabad in the 2000s. He later worked as a coach at the Hyderabad Cricket Association (HCA) Satellite Academy and trained young fast bowlers at the Gymkhana Ground in Hyderabad. Yadav also officiated in several matches as the match referee and worked as a selector for HCA.

== Personal life ==
Yadav's brother Shivlal Yadav played Test and ODI cricket for India, and later worked as the secretary of HCA and interim president of the Board of Control for Cricket in India. Shivlal's son Arjun Yadav also played first-class cricket for Hyderabad and South Zone. Rajesh's son Yuvraj Yadav is also a cricketer who represented Hyderabad in age-group cricket.
