= 2000–01 Hyderabad C.A. season =

Hyderabad C.A.
2000–01 season
- Coach: Arshad Ayub
- Captain: V. V. S. Laxman
- Ground(s): Gymkhana Ground, Hyderabad
- Ranji Trophy: Pre–quarterfinals
- Ranji One–Day Trophy: South Zone (3rd)

The 2000–01 season is Hyderabad cricket team's 67th competitive season. The Hyderabad cricket team is senior men's domestic cricket team based in the city of Hyderabad, India, run by the Hyderabad Cricket Association. They represent the region of Telangana in the state of Andhra Pradesh in domestic competitions.

== Squad ==
The following players made at least one appearance for Hyderabad in first-class, List A or Twenty20 cricket in 2019–20 season. Age given is at the start of Hyderabad's first match of the season (1 November 2000).
Players with international caps are listed in bold.

Name	Birth date	Batting style	Bowling style	Notes
Batsmen
**Mohammad Azharuddin**	8 February 1963 (aged 37)	Right-handed	Right-arm medium fast	Banned for life by the BCCI on 5 December in the aftermath of match fixing scandal.
Nand Kishore	10 July 1970 (aged 30)	Right-handed	Right-arm medium fast	Played for **South Zone** in the **2000-01 Duleep Trophy**.
Devisetty Vinay Kumar	21 April 1977 (aged 23)	Right-handed	Right-arm off break	
**VVS Laxman**	1 September 1974 (aged 26)	Right-handed	Right-arm off spin	**First Class and List A Captain.** Played for **Rest of India** in the **2000 Irani Cup**. Played for **South Zone** in the **2000–01 Deodhar Trophy**. Played for **South Zone** in the **2000-01 Duleep Trophy**. Played for **India Seniors** in the **2000-01 NKP Salve Challenger Trophy**.
Vanka Pratap	21 September 1973 (aged 26)	Right-handed	Right-arm medium fast	Played for **South Zone** in the **2000–01 Deodhar Trophy**.
Fathima Reddy	31 August 1979 (aged 21)	Left-handed	Slow left arm orthodox	
Anirudh Singh	2 August 1980 (aged 20)	Left-handed	Right-arm medium fast	**First Class** debut.
Arjun Yadav	23 December 1981 (aged 18)	Right-handed	Right-arm off break	
All-rounders
Daniel Manohar	13 March 1974 (aged 26)	Left-handed	Right-arm medium fast	
Parth Satwalkar	28 June 1974 (aged 26)	Right-handed	Right-arm medium fast	
Wicket-keepers
Vijay Kumar	16 March 1975 (aged 25)	Right-handed		**First Class** debut.
Mangalapally Srinivas	26 December 1974 (aged 25)	Right-handed		**First Class** debut.
Bowlers
Faiz Ahmed	21 June 1978 (aged 22)	Left-handed	Left-arm medium fast	**List A** debut.
Mohammad Ghouse Baba	6 September 1978 (aged 21)	Left-handed	Left-arm medium fast	**First Class** and **List A** debut.
Pawan Kumar	19 September 1970 (aged 29)	Right-handed	Right-arm medium fast	
**Venkatapathy Raju**	9 July 1969 (aged 31)	Right-handed	Slow left arm orthodox	Played for **South Zone** in the **2000–01 Deodhar Trophy**. Played for **South Zone** in the **2000-01 Duleep Trophy**.
Narender Pal Singh	10 September 1973 (aged 26)	Right-handed	Right-arm medium fast	Played for **South Zone** in the **2000-01 Duleep Trophy**.
Kanwaljit Singh	15 April 1958 (aged 42)	Right-handed	Right-arm off break	Announced **retirement** at the end of the season.
Ramakrishnan Sridhar	16 July 1970 (aged 30)	Left-handed	Slow left arm orthodox	Announced **retirement** at the end of the season.
Santosh Yadav	17 October 1979 (aged 20)	Left-handed	Right-arm off break	
Shivaji Yadav	6 September 1976 (aged 23)	Right-handed	Right-arm off break	

== Competitions ==
=== Overview ===
Category	Competition	Format	First match	Last match	Final position	Pld	W	L	D / T / NR	Win %
Senior men's	Ranji Trophy	First-class cricket	1 November 2000	10 March 2001	Prequarter-finals	6	2	0	4	33.33%
Senior men's	Ranji One–Day Trophy	List A cricket	5 December 2000	11 December 2000	Zonal Stage	5	3	2	0	60%

=== Ranji Trophy ===
The Hyderabad team, led by V. V. S. Laxman, began their campaign in the Ranji Trophy, the premier first-class cricket tournament in India, with a draw against the Karnataka at Bangalore on 1 November 2000. Though Mohammad Azharuddin got selected for the tournament, he did not play a single match owing to the match fixing allegations which he confessed on 2 November 2000. Azharuddin was later banned for life by the Board of Control for Cricket in India on 5 December 2000. Despite losing Azharuddin, the Hyderabad still managed to finish inside top-3 in the South Zone and advance to the knockout stage with two wins and three draws. With the absence of their main players due to various reasons for the knockout stage, the Hyderabad were eliminated in the pre-quarterfinal where the Madhya Pradesh defeated Hyderabad through first innings lead.

==== Points Table ====
South Zone

Team	Pld	W	L	D	A	Pts
Tamil Nadu	5	1	0	3	1	26
Hyderabad	5	2	0	3	0	25
Karnataka	5	2	1	2	0	24
Kerala	5	1	1	3	0	21
Andhra	5	1	1	2	1	19
Goa	5	0	4	1	0	3

- Top three teams advanced to the knockout stage.
- Points system : Win = 8, Draw with first innings lead = 5, No Result = 3, Draw with first innings deficit = 3, Loss = 0.

==== Knockout stage ====
Pre-Quarterfinals
WZ3	Baroda	467 & 355
EZ3	Bengal	247 & 353
SZ1	Tamil Nadu	592 & 518/8d
NZ2	Delhi	365 & 149/1
CZ3	Madhya Pradesh	490 & 291
SZ2	Hyderabad	382 & 50/2
EZ1	Orissa	501 & 299/4d
NZ3	Jammu & Kashmir	151 & 229
CZ1	Rajasthan	111 & 306
NZ1	Punjab	429
WZ1	Mumbai (Note: Mumbai got bye in Round of 16 on the virtue of winning 1999–2000 Ranji Trophy.)
bye
CZ2	Railways	431 & 657/5
WZ2	Maharashtra	308
EZ2	Assam	321 & 134
SZ3	Karnataka	312 & 144/3

Quarterfinals
WZ3	Baroda	324 & 184
SZ1	Tamil Nadu	186 & 162
CZ3	Madhya Pradesh	437 & 233/9d
EZ1	Orissa	479 & 192/3
NZ1	Punjab	383 & 322
WZ1	Mumbai	285 & 213
CZ2	Railways	451 & 418/9d
SZ3	Karnataka	237 & 279/4

Semifinals
WZ3	Baroda	568 & 409
EZ1	Orissa	280 & 361/5
NZ1	Punjab	249 & 356
CZ2	Railways	407 & 199/5

Final
WZ3	Baroda	243 & 373
CZ2	Railways	394 & 201

==== Matches ====
Zonal Stage

1–4 November 2000	Karnataka	v	Hyderabad	Match Drawn Karnataka took first innings lead
Scorecard	545/9 (160.3 overs); Thilak Naidu 122 (209); Venkatapathy Raju 4/118 (51.3 overs)		291 (97.2 overs); Daniel Manohar 73 (161); Javagal Srinath 4/86 (19 overs)	M. Chinnaswamy Stadium, Bangalore; Umpires: M. S. Sekhon and Umesh Kumar
Scorecard			233/2 (88 overs) (f/o); V. V. S. Laxman 100* (159); Anand Yalvigi 1/72 (26 overs)	M. Chinnaswamy Stadium, Bangalore; Umpires: M. S. Sekhon and Umesh Kumar
Karnataka won the toss and elected to bat

8–11 November 2000	Hyderabad	v	Kerala	Hyderabad won by an innings and 46 runs
Scorecard	489/9d (157 overs); Vanka Pratap 128 (272); Tinu Yohannan 6/117 (42 overs)		165 (46.2 overs); Renjith Menon 50 (79); Venkatapathy Raju 4/49 (15 overs)	Nuclear Fuel Complex Ground, Hyderabad; Umpires: A K Bharadwaj and D D Sharma
Scorecard			278 (85.5 overs) (f/o); Ajay Kudva 61 (115); Narender Pal Singh 5/39 (15 overs)	Nuclear Fuel Complex Ground, Hyderabad; Umpires: A K Bharadwaj and D D Sharma
Hyderabad won the toss and elected to bat

15–18 November 2000	Tamil Nadu	v	Hyderabad	Match Drawn Tamil Nadu took first innings lead
Scorecard	556 (173.4 overs); Rajat Bhatia 134 (270); Daniel Manohar 4/72 (22 overs)		380 (129.5 overs); Nand Kishore 128 (227); Vidyut Sivaramakrishnan 4/79 (26.5 overs)	Nuclear Fuel Complex Ground, Hyderabad; Umpires: K. S. Giridharan and Kamlesh Sharma
Scorecard	205/5 (46 overs); Vidyut Sivaramakrishnan 82 (68); Narender Pal Singh 3/26 (9 overs)			Nuclear Fuel Complex Ground, Hyderabad; Umpires: K. S. Giridharan and Kamlesh Sharma
Tamil Nadu won the toss and elected to bat

22–25 November 2000	Hyderabad	v	Goa	Hyderabad won by 153 runs
Scorecard	315 (107.1 overs); Anirudh Singh 86 (239); Avinash Aware 5/92 (33.1 overs)		175 (72.5 overs); S Medappa 36 (101); Venkatapathy Raju 5/16 (17.5 overs)	Nuclear Fuel Complex Ground, Hyderabad; Umpires: M G Mandale and M S Pawar
Scorecard	239/8d (62 overs); Daniel Manohar 82 (131); Saiyed Khalid 4/51 (14 overs)		226 (101.2 overs); Dinesh Rao 54 (163); Narender Pal Singh 4/81 (29.2 overs)	Nuclear Fuel Complex Ground, Hyderabad; Umpires: M G Mandale and M S Pawar
Hyderabad won the toss and elected to bat

29 November – 2 December 2000	Andhra	v	Hyderabad	Match Drawn Andhra took first innings lead
Scorecard	386 (125 overs); GN Srinivas 106 (242); Narender Pal Singh 4/108 (30 overs)		349 (119.3 overs); Devishetty Vinay Kumar 97 (221); Syed Shahabuddin 5/106 (37.3 overs)	Kurnool Stadium, Kurnool; Umpires: Aloke Bhattacharjee and Anirudh Singh
Scorecard	193/7 (67 overs); GN Srinivas 88 (130); Shivaji Yadav 7/70 (28 overs)			Kurnool Stadium, Kurnool; Umpires: Aloke Bhattacharjee and Anirudh Singh
Andhra won the toss and elected to bat

Pre–quarterfinal

10–13 March 2001	Madhya Pradesh	v	Hyderabad	Match Drawn Madhya Pradesh advanced on first innings lead
Scorecard	490 (168.3 overs); Devendra Bundela 144 (278); Kanwaljit Singh 4/95 (44 overs)		382 (152.5 overs); Mangalapally Srinivas 107 (187); Rajesh Chauhan 3/84 (51 overs)	Daly College Ground, Indore; Umpires: M. S. Mahal and H. S. Sekhon
Scorecard	291 (70.3 overs); Abbas Ali 69 (64); Kanwaljit Singh 5/97 (23.3 overs)		50/2 (8 overs); Daniel Manohar 25 (14); Y Golwalkar 2/15 (3 overs)	Daly College Ground, Indore; Umpires: M. S. Mahal and H. S. Sekhon
Madhya Pradesh won the toss and elected to bat

=== Ranji One–Day Trophy ===
The Hyderabad team, led by V. V. S. Laxman, began their campaign in the Subbaiah Pillai Trophy as part of the South Zone Ranji One–Day Trophy, a List-A cricket tournament in India, with a win against the Andhra at Chennai on 5 December 2000. In a rain-hit reduced over match, the half-century from Amit Pathak helped the Andhra post 150 in 25 overs but the half-century from Daniel Manohar along with the support from Laxman with his 43 off 47 balls ensured the seven-wicket win for the Hyderabad. In the second match, the four-wicket haul from Venkatapathy Raju and an unbeaten half-century from Nand Kishore helped the Hyderabad defeat the Karnataka by eight wickets. The Hyderabad got their third win of the tournament in as many matches as Mohammad Ghouse Baba's all-round effort consisting of 20 off eight balls and bowling figures of 1/29 in ten overs helped the Hyderabad defeat the Kerala by 64 runs. The Hyderabad also got the support through the half-centuries from Manohar, Vanka Pratap and Devishetty Vinay Kumar in the batting and the three-wicket haul from Raju in the bowling. The Hyderabad suffered their first loss in this tournament when the Tamil Nadu chased their target in the last ball with three-wickets to spare. Earlier, the Hyderabad posted 256 in 50 overs with the century from Pratap while the Tamil Nadu suffered for their slow-over rate as their chase was reduced to 47 overs. The Tamil Nadu started the chase with the half-centuries from Sadagoppan Ramesh and Jayaraman Madanagopal while the brisk scoring from Robin Singh helped them in the end after their middle-order collapse. The defeat against the Tamil Nadu hurt the Hyderabad in their final zonal match as their batting collapsed while trying to quickly chase the target of 235 set by the Goa to improve their chances of qualifying for the Wills Trophy. Earlier, the three-wicket haul from Narender Pal Singh helped the Hyderabad restrict the Goa to 235 despite the half-century from Tanveer Jabbar. On realizing that Tamil Nadu was about to have a big win in their final zonal match, the Hyderabad started chasing the target in quick pace with Laxman and Manohar adding 125 runs in just 12 overs but their batting order collapsed in the middle when the both set batsmen were dismissed as the Goa emerged as the victorious in the end by two runs. This loss resulted in the Hyderabad finishing third in the South Zone with three wins and two losses as they failed to qualify for the Wills Trophy.

==== Points Table ====
South Zone

Team	Pld	W	L	T	NR	Pts	NRR
Tamil Nadu	5	4	1	0	0	8	+0.873
Karnataka (Note: Karnataka qualified with the head to head rule.)	5	4	1	0	0	8	+0.569
Hyderabad	5	3	2	0	0	6	+0.453
Kerala	5	2	3	0	0	4	-0.852
Andhra	5	1	4	0	0	2	-0.079
Goa	5	1	4	0	0	2	-0.820

- Top team qualified for the 2001–02 Wills Trophy.
- Points system : Win = 2, Tie/No Result = 1, Loss = 0.

==== Matches ====
Zonal Stage

5 December 2000	Andhra; 150/5 (25 overs)	v	Hyderabad; 151/3 (24 overs)	Hyderabad won by 7 wickets
Report	Andhra; 150/5 (25 overs)	v	Hyderabad; 151/3 (24 overs)	Guru Nanak College Ground, Chennai
Report	Amit Pathak 68 (62)		Daniel Manohar 58	Guru Nanak College Ground, Chennai
Hyderabad won the toss and elected to field.				Guru Nanak College Ground, Chennai

6 December 2000	Karnataka; 142	v	Hyderabad; 143/2 (30.5 overs)	Hyderabad won by 8 wickets
Report	Karnataka; 142	v	Hyderabad; 143/2 (30.5 overs)	M. A. Chidambaram Stadium, Chennai
Report	Thilak Naidu 30; Venkatapathy Raju 4/36		Nand Kishore 62*	M. A. Chidambaram Stadium, Chennai
Karnataka won the toss and elected to bat.				M. A. Chidambaram Stadium, Chennai

8 December 2000	Hyderabad; 272/7 (50 overs)	v	Kerala; 208 (48 overs)	Hyderabad won by 64 runs
Report	Hyderabad; 272/7 (50 overs)	v	Kerala; 208 (48 overs)	Guru Nanak College Ground, Chennai
Report	Daniel Manohar 60; K. N. Ananthapadmanabhan 3/45		K Chandrashekhar 55 (62); Venkatapathy Raju 3/32	Guru Nanak College Ground, Chennai
Hyderabad won the toss and elected to bat.				Guru Nanak College Ground, Chennai

9 December 2000	Hyderabad; 256 (50 overs)	v	Tamil Nadu; 257/7 (47 overs)	Tamil Nadu won by 3 wickets
Report	Hyderabad; 256 (50 overs)	v	Tamil Nadu; 257/7 (47 overs)	M. A. Chidambaram Stadium, Chennai
Report	Vanka Pratap 107 (132)		Sadagoppan Ramesh 82	M. A. Chidambaram Stadium, Chennai
Tamil Nadu won the toss and elected to field.; Tamil Nadu's innings was reduced to 47 overs for a slow over rate.				M. A. Chidambaram Stadium, Chennai

11 December 2000	Goa; 235/8 (50 overs)	v	Hyderabad; 233 (33.3 overs)	Goa won by 2 runs
Report	Goa; 235/8 (50 overs)	v	Hyderabad; 233 (33.3 overs)	Central Polytechnic India Pistons Ground, Chennai
Report	Tanveer Jabbar 77 (105); Narender Pal Singh 3/24 (8 overs)		Daniel Manohar 95 (77); Satyajit Medaapa 3/	Central Polytechnic India Pistons Ground, Chennai
Goa won the toss and elected to bat.				Central Polytechnic India Pistons Ground, Chennai

== Player statistics ==
=== Batting and Fielding ===
Player	First class									List A								
Player	Matches	Innings	Runs	Highest score	Average	100s	50s	Catches	Stumpings	Matches	Innings	Runs	Highest score	Average	100s	50s	Catches	Stumpings
Batsmen
Nand Kishore	6	8	353	128	49.85	1	1	4	–	5	4	102	62*	34.00	0	1	1	–
Devisetty Vinay Kumar	6	8	280	97	40.00	0	3	8	–	5	3	73	53*	36.50	0	1	2	–
VVS Laxman	1	2	160	100*	160.00	1	1	0	–	5	5	158	74	31.60	0	1	4	–
Vanka Pratap	6	9	349	128	49.85	1	1	8	–	5	4	206	107	68.66	1	1	0	–
Anirudh Singh	5	7	283	90	47.16	0	2	3	1									
Arjun Yadav	1	1	3	3	3.00	0	0	0	–									
All-rounders
Daniel Manohar	6	9	438	82	48.66	0	5	6	–	5	5	268	94	53.60	0	3	3	–
Parth Satwalkar	4	5	96	55	19.20	0	1	0	–	5	4	77	39	25.66	0	0	0	–
Wicket-keepers
Vijay Kumar	1	1	29	29	29.00	0	0	0	0									
Mangalapally Srinivas	5	6	178	107	29.66	1	0	8	2	5	4	52	21	17.33	0	0	1	2
Bowlers
Faiz Ahmed	3	3	72	49*	36.00	0	0	1	–	1	1	10	10	10.00	0	0	0	–
Mohammad Ghouse Baba	3	4	64	25	16.00	0	0	1	–	4	2	20	20	10.00	0	0	3	–
Venkatapathy Raju	5	5	52	24*	26.00	0	0	3	–	5	2	0	0*	–	0	0	1	–
Narender Pal Singh	6	7	34	23	5.66	0	0	4	–	5	2	11	7	11.00	0	0	5	–
Kanwaljit Singh	4	4	27	12	13.50	0	0	3	–									
Ramakrishnan Sridhar	1	1	14	14	14.00	0	0	1	–									
Shivaji Yadav	3	4	109	39	36.33	0	0	2	–	5	4	5	4	1.66	0	0	1	–
Source: ESPNcricinfo

=== Bowling ===
Player	First class							List A						
Player	Matches	Overs	Wickets	Average	BBI	5wi	10wm	Matches	Overs	Wickets	Average	Economy	BBI	5wi
Faiz Ahmed	3	79.0	2	146.00	1/55	0	0	1	7.0	0	–	4.85	–	–
Mohammad Ghouse Baba	3	119.3	13	26.00	5/97	1	0	4	33.0	4	38.50	4.66	1/29	0
VVS Laxman	1	8.0	0	–	–	–	–	5	24.0	3	40.00	5.00	2/42	0
Daniel Manohar	6	101.0	7	46.42	4/72	0	0	5	10.0	3	23.33	7.00	1/15	0
Vanka Pratap	6	11.0	0	–	–	–	–							
Venkatapathy Raju	5	209.2	17	27.00	5/16	1	0	5	43.4	12	14.16	3.89	4/36	0
Parth Satwalkar	4	64.5	6	43.66	3/64	0	0	5	26.0	2	62.50	4.80	1/27	0
Narender Pal Singh	6	183.2	23	26.17	5/39	1	0	5	37.0	8	18.75	4.05	3/24	0
Kanwaljit Singh	4	177.0	15	34.20	5/100	1	0							
Ramakrishnan Sridhar	1	42.0	1	138.00	1/101	0	0							
Arjun Yadav	1	4.0	0	–	–	–	–							
Shivaji Yadav	3	118.3	15	24.26	7/70	1	0	5	30.3	4	34.25	4.49	2/30	0
Source: ESPNcricinfo

== See also ==
- Hyderabad cricket team
- Hyderabad Cricket Association
