= 2004–05 Hyderabad C.A. season =

Hyderabad C.A.
2004–05 season
- Captain: Venkatapathy Raju (FC); Arjun Yadav (LA)
- Ground(s): Gymkhana Ground, Hyderabad
- Ranji Trophy: Semi-finals
- Ranji One–Day Trophy: South Zone (4th)

The 2004–05 season is Hyderabad cricket team's 71st competitive season. The Hyderabad cricket team is senior men's domestic cricket team based in the city of Hyderabad, India, run by the Hyderabad Cricket Association. They represent the region of Telangana in the state of Andhra Pradesh in domestic competitions.

== Competition overview ==
Category	Competition	Format	First match	Last match	Final position	Pld	W	L	D / T / NR	Win %
Senior men's	Ranji Trophy	First-class cricket	7 November 2004	18 March 2005	Semi-finals	7	4	3	0	57.14%
Senior men's	Ranji One–Day Trophy	List A cricket	9 January 2005	15 January 2005	Zonal Stage	5	1	4	0	20%

== Squads ==
Ranji Trophy	Ranji One–Day Trophy
Venkatapathy Raju (c); Anirudh Singh; Fahad Shahnawaz; Kaushik Reddy; Ibrahim Khaleel (wk); V. V. S. Laxman; Daniel Manohar; Mohammad Ghouse Baba; Nand Kishore; Narender Pal Singh; Pagadala Niranjan; Pragyan Ojha; Ambati Rayudu; Shashank Nag; Inder Shekar Reddy; Tirumalasetti Suman; Devishetty Vinay Kumar; Sankinani Vishnuvardhan; Arjun Yadav; Shivaji Yadav	Arjun Yadav (c); Abhinav Kumar; Anirudh Singh; Kaushik Reddy; Ibrahim Khaleel (wk); Daniel Manohar; Mohammad Nadeemuddin; Pagadala Niranjan; Ambati Rayudu; Inder Shekar Reddy; Tirumalasetti Suman; Devishetty Vinay Kumar; Sankinani Vishnuvardhan; Shivaji Yadav

Irani Cup

Rayudu got selected to the Rest of India squad for the 2004 Irani Cup, a first-class cricket competition in India.

Deodhar Trophy

Laxman, Arjun and Vishnuvardhan got selected to the South Zone squad for the 2004-05 Deodhar Trophy, a List-A cricket competition in India.

NKP Salve Challenger Trophy

Laxman and Rayudu got picked to the India B squad for the 2004-05 NKP Salve Challenger Trophy, a List-A cricket tournament in India.

Duleep Trophy

Laxman got selected to the South Zone squad for the 2004-05 Duleep Trophy, a first-class cricket tournament in India.

== Ranji Trophy ==
The Hyderabad team, led by Venkatapathy Raju, began their campaign in the Ranji Trophy, the premier first-class cricket tournament in India, with a loss against Tamil Nadu at Chennai on 7 November 2004. The Hyderabad captain, Raju announced his retirement from the first-class cricket during the third day of the match against the Uttar Pradesh. V. V. S. Laxman replaced Raju as the captain of the Hyderabad for the remaining two matches. They finished inside top-2 in Group B of the Elite League to advance to the Elite semi-final with four wins and two losses. They were eliminated in the semi-final where the Railways defeated the Hyderabad by 7 wickets.

=== Points Table ===
Elite Group B

Team	Pld	W	L	D	A	Pts
Hyderabad	6	4	2	0	0	17
Punjab	6	3	1	2	0	16
Baroda	6	3	1	2	0	16
Tamil Nadu	6	2	1	3	0	15
Uttar Pradesh	6	2	2	2	0	8
Maharashtra	6	1	4	1	0	5
Assam	6	0	4	2	0	0

- Top two teams advanced to the knockout stage.
- Bottom team relegated to the Plate Group for the 2005–06 Ranji Trophy.
- Points system : Win by an innings or 10 wickets = 5, Win = 4, Draw with first innings lead = 2, No Result = 2, Draw with first innings deficit = 0, Loss = 0.

=== Knockout stage ===
Semifinals
B1	Hyderabad	166 & 170
A2	Railways	180 & 160/3
A1	Mumbai	251 & 168
B2	Punjab	126 & 294/7

Final
A2	Railways	355 & 471
B2	Punjab	309 & 137/4

=== Matches ===
Group Stage

7–10 November 2004	Hyderabad	v	Tamil Nadu	Tamil Nadu won by an innings and 108 runs
Scorecard	163 (74.2 overs); Venkatapathy Raju 25* (65); Ramakrishnan Ramkumar 6/57 (31 overs)		461/6d (131 overs); Vidyut Sivaramakrishnan 130 (239); Inder Shekar Reddy 3/130 (37 overs)	M. A. Chidambaram Stadium, Chennai; Umpires: Sudhir Asnani and K. S. Giridharan
Scorecard	190 (81.1 overs); Daniel Manohar 75 (157); Ramakrishnan Ramkumar 6/71 (28 overs)			M. A. Chidambaram Stadium, Chennai; Umpires: Sudhir Asnani and K. S. Giridharan
Hyderabad won the toss and elected to bat.

25–28 November 2004	Hyderabad	v	Maharashtra	Hyderabad won by 85 runs
Scorecard	231 (85.3 overs); Anirudh Singh 103 (183); Anupam Sanklecha 4/47 (20 overs)		83 (32 overs); Satyajit Satbhai 31 (33); Narender Pal Singh 4/29 (12 overs)	Gymkhana Ground, Hyderabad; Umpires: Balwant Sharma and M. S. Mahal
Scorecard	170 (56 overs); Ibrahim Khaleel 41 (93); Anupam Sanklecha 5/46 (18 overs)		233 (69.3 overs); Dheeraj Jadhav 124* (215); Narender Pal Singh 6/87 (25 overs)	Gymkhana Ground, Hyderabad; Umpires: Balwant Sharma and M. S. Mahal
Maharashtra won the toss and elected to field.; Shashank Nag and Fahad Shahnawaz (Hyderabad) made their first-class debuts.

4–7 December 2004	Hyderabad	v	Baroda	Baroda won by 5 wickets
Scorecard	170 (77.2 overs); Daniel Manohar 54 (102); Rakesh Patel 5/40 (25 overs)		93 (27.2 overs); Shekhar Joshi 23 (60); Narender Pal Singh 7/58 (14 overs)	Gymkhana Ground, Hyderabad; Umpires: Sudhir Asnani and Rajiv Risodkar
Scorecard	198 (81.3 overs); Ibrahim Khaleel 65 (199); Rajesh Pawar 3/30 (16.3 overs)		279/5 (107.1 overs); Rajesh Pawar 95* (169); Venkatapathy Raju 2/42 (25 overs)	Gymkhana Ground, Hyderabad; Umpires: Sudhir Asnani and Rajiv Risodkar
Hyderabad won the toss and elected to bat.

13–16 December 2004	Hyderabad	v	Uttar Pradesh	Hyderabad won by 22 runs
Scorecard	246 (91.5 overs); Devishetty Vinay Kumar 66 (167); Praveen Gupta 3/40 (18 overs)		325 (93.2 overs); Rizwan Shamshad 103 (215); Narender Pal Singh 4/85 (25 overs)	Gymkhana Ground, Hyderabad; Umpires: S. K. Sharma and Francis Gomes
Scorecard	221 (78.3 overs); Devishetty Vinay Kumar 75 (165); Shalabh Srivastava 5/55 (16.3 overs)		120 (36.3 overs); Suresh Raina 36 (46); Narender Pal Singh 5/51 (15.3 overs)	Gymkhana Ground, Hyderabad; Umpires: S. K. Sharma and Francis Gomes
Uttar Pradesh won the toss and elected to field.

22–25 December 2004	Hyderabad	v	Punjab	Hyderabad won by 60 runs
Scorecard	233 (62.4 overs); V. V. S. Laxman 79 (102); V. R. V. Singh 7/75 (16.4 overs)		105 (51 overs); Ankur Kakkar 48 (130); Sankinani Vishnuvardhan 3/29 (18 overs)	Gymkhana Ground, Hyderabad; Umpires: Sameer Bandekar and Aloke Bhattacharjee
Scorecard	149 (50.5 overs); V. V. S. Laxman 60 (81); V. R. V. Singh 6/40 (13.5 overs)		217 (73 overs); Gaurav Gupta 87* (152); Narender Pal Singh 4/62 (20 overs)	Gymkhana Ground, Hyderabad; Umpires: Sameer Bandekar and Aloke Bhattacharjee
Punjab won the toss and elected to field.; Kaushik Reddy (Hyderabad); Love Ablish (Punjab) all made their first-class debuts.

31 December 2004 – 3 January 2005	Hyderabad	v	Assam	Hyderabad won by an innings and 56 runs
Scorecard	340 (91.4 overs); V. V. S. Laxman 135 (185); Rajagopal Sathish 3/18 (6.4 overs)		158 (78.1 overs); Gokul Sharma 44 (144); Inder Shekar Reddy 4/37 (19 overs)	Gymkhana Ground, Hyderabad; Umpires: Ravi Deshmukh and B. Jamula
Scorecard			126 (46.3 overs) (f/o); Rajagopal Satish 56 (63); Sankinani Vishnuvardhan 3/21 (12.3 overs)	Gymkhana Ground, Hyderabad; Umpires: Ravi Deshmukh and B. Jamula
Assam won the toss and elected to field.; Jason Lamare (Assam) made his first-class debut.

Semi-final

18–21 March 2005	Hyderabad	v	Railways	Railways won by 7 wickets
Scorecard	166 (57.5 overs); Anirudh Singh 92 (171); Harvinder Singh 4/28 (15 overs)		180 (59.5 overs); Amit Pagnis 42 (65); Pragyan Ojha 5/55 (22 overs)	Karnail Singh Stadium, New Delhi; Umpires: Suresh Shastri and Sameer Bandekar
Scorecard	170 (84.5 overs); Daniel Manohar 75 (250); Harvinder Singh 3/32 (11.5 overs)		160/3 (47 overs); Amit Pagnis 98* (141); Pragyan Ojha 2/58 (18 overs)	Karnail Singh Stadium, New Delhi; Umpires: Suresh Shastri and Sameer Bandekar
Hyderabad won the toss and elected to bat.; Pagadala Niranjan and Pragyan Ojha (Hyderabad) made their first-class debuts.

=== Statistics ===
Most runs

Player	Mat	Inns	Runs	Ave	SR	HS	100	50
Anirudh Singh	7	13	413	31.76	47.36	103	1	1
Daniel Manohar	7	13	387	29.76	44.27	75	0	4
V. V. S. Laxman	2	3	274	91.33	74.45	135	1	2

- Source: ESPNcricinfo

Most wickets

Player	Mat	Inns	Wkts	Ave	Econ	BBI	SR	5WI	10WM
Narender Pal Singh	7	13	34	18.85	3.03	7/58	37.3	3	1
Sankinani Vishnuvardhan	3	6	16	15.31	2.37	3/21	38.6	0	0
Inder Shekar Reddy	4	6	15	20.60	2.66	4/37	46.4	0	0

- Source: ESPNcricinfo

== Ranji One–Day Trophy ==
The Hyderabad team, led by Arjun Yadav, began their campaign in the Subbaiah Pillai Trophy as part of the South Zone Ranji One–Day Trophy, a List-A cricket tournament in India, with a loss against the Karnataka at Margao on 9 January 2005. The Hyderabad troubled the Karnataka top-order with three quick wickets but the middle-order helped the Karnataka to recover to 244 while the tight-bowling by the Karnataka bowlers ensured them a 15-run win despite the half-centuries from Daniel Manohar, Arjun and Ambati Rayudu. In a 42-over reduced rain-hit match, the top-order and lower-order collapse despite the half-centuries from Rayudu and Anirudh Singh restricted the Hyderabad to 166 while an unbeaten half-century from Sreekumar Nair helped the Kerala chase the target with five-wickets to spare. In the third match, the century from Abhinav Kumar along with an unbeaten half-century from Anirudh helped the Hyderabad post 288 but an unbeaten half-century from Sridharan Sharath and the half-century from Subramaniam Badrinath helped the Tamil Nadu chase the target with six-wickets to spare. In the fourth match, the Hyderabad top-order failed once again but the half-century from Rayudu and collective effort from the others helped them recover to 254 while the three-wicket haul from Inder Shekar Reddy along with the two-wicket hauls from Sankinani Vishnuvardhan and Pagadala Niranjan helped the Hyderabad win their first match of the tournament against the Goa by 78 runs despite the half-century from Mandar Phadke. In the final zonal match, Yalaka Venugopal Rao's five wicket haul helped the Andhra bowl the Hyderabad out for 144 while an unbeaten half-century from M. S. K. Prasad helped the Andhra chase the target with four-wickets to spare despite two-wicket hauls and tight bowling from Inder Shekar and Shivaji. This loss resulted the Hyderabad finish at fourth in the South Zone and failed to advance to the knockout stage with a win and four losses.

=== Points Table ===
South Zone

Team	Pld	W	L	T	NR	Pts
Tamil Nadu	5	5	0	0	0	23
Karnataka	5	4	1	0	0	18
Kerala	5	3	2	0	0	11
Hyderabad	5	1	4	0	0	5
Andhra	5	1	4	0	0	2
Goa	5	1	4	0	0	1

- Top two teams advanced to the knockout stage.

=== Matches ===
Zonal Stage

9 January 2005	Karnataka; 244/9 (50 overs)	v	Hyderabad; 229/7 (50 overs)	Karnataka won by 15 runs
Scorecard	Karnataka; 244/9 (50 overs)	v	Hyderabad; 229/7 (50 overs)	Arlem Breweries Ground, Margao; Umpires: Subrat Das and Sukanta Pathak
Scorecard	Sujith Somasunder 40 (65); Kaushik Reddy 2/35 (9 overs)		Amol Shinde 80 (104); Dodda Ganesh 2/32 (6 overs)	Arlem Breweries Ground, Margao; Umpires: Subrat Das and Sukanta Pathak
Hyderabad won the toss and elected to field.; Kaushik Reddy (Hyderabad) made his List-A debut.; Points : Karnataka 4; Hyderabad 0				Arlem Breweries Ground, Margao; Umpires: Subrat Das and Sukanta Pathak

10 January 2005	Hyderabad; 166/9 (42 overs)	v	Kerala; 170/5 (39.3 overs)	Kerala won by 5 wickets
Scorecard	Hyderabad; 166/9 (42 overs)	v	Kerala; 170/5 (39.3 overs)	Arlem Breweries Ground, Margao; Umpires: Subrat Das and Sukanta Pathak
Scorecard	Anirudh Singh 61* (94); Prasanth Chandran 3/49 (9 overs)		Sreekumar Nair 60* (85); Sankinani Vishnuvardhan 2/22 (7.3 overs)	Arlem Breweries Ground, Margao; Umpires: Subrat Das and Sukanta Pathak
Hyderabad won the toss and elected to bat.; Points : Kerala 4; Hyderabad 0				Arlem Breweries Ground, Margao; Umpires: Subrat Das and Sukanta Pathak

12 January 2005	Hyderabad; 288/5 (50 overs)	v	Tamil Nadu; 290/4 (46.5 overs)	Tamil Nadu won by 6 wickets
Scorecard	Hyderabad; 288/5 (50 overs)	v	Tamil Nadu; 290/4 (46.5 overs)	Dr. Rajendra Prasad Stadium, Margao; Umpires: Sanjeev Dua and Sukanta Pathak
Scorecard	Abhinav Kumar 110 (138); Ramakrishnan Ramkumar 2/53 (10 overs)		Sridharan Sharath 103* (110); Daniel Manohar 1/25 (5 overs)	Dr. Rajendra Prasad Stadium, Margao; Umpires: Sanjeev Dua and Sukanta Pathak
Tamil Nadu won the toss and elected to field.; Abhinav Kumar and Pagadala Niranjan (Hyderabad) made their List-A debuts.; Points : Tamil Nadu 4; Hyderabad 0				Dr. Rajendra Prasad Stadium, Margao; Umpires: Sanjeev Dua and Sukanta Pathak

13 January 2005	Hyderabad; 254 (50 overs)	v	Goa; 176 (35.4 overs)	Hyderabad won by 78 runs
Scorecard	Hyderabad; 254 (50 overs)	v	Goa; 176 (35.4 overs)	Bhausaheb Bandodkar Ground, Panaji; Umpires: Sakti Biswas and Abdul Azeem
Scorecard	Ambati Rayudu 73 (97); AP Naik 2/34 (9 overs)		Mandar Phadke 66 (53); Inder Shekar Reddy 3/50 (10 overs)	Bhausaheb Bandodkar Ground, Panaji; Umpires: Sakti Biswas and Abdul Azeem
Hyderabad won the toss and elected to bat.; S Dabholkar and AP Naik (Goa) made their List-A debuts.; Points : Hyderabad 5; Goa -1				Bhausaheb Bandodkar Ground, Panaji; Umpires: Sakti Biswas and Abdul Azeem

15 January 2005	Hyderabad; 146 (41.3 overs)	v	Andhra; 148/6 (40.5 overs)	Andhra won by 4 wickets
Scorecard	Hyderabad; 146 (41.3 overs)	v	Andhra; 148/6 (40.5 overs)	Bhausaheb Bandodkar Ground, Panaji; Umpires: AY Gokhale and Subroto Porel
Scorecard	Ibrahim Khaleel 33 (51); Yalaka Venugopal Rao 5/20 (8.3 overs)		M. S. K. Prasad 68* (103); Inder Shekar Reddy 2/30 (10 overs)	Bhausaheb Bandodkar Ground, Panaji; Umpires: AY Gokhale and Subroto Porel
Hyderabad won the toss and elected to bat.; Points : Andhra 4; Hyderabad 0				Bhausaheb Bandodkar Ground, Panaji; Umpires: AY Gokhale and Subroto Porel

=== Statistics ===
Most runs

Player	Mat	Inns	Runs	Ave	SR	HS	100	50
Ambati Rayudu	4	4	205	51.25	82.32	73	0	3
Anirudh Singh	5	5	174	58.00	84.05	68*	0	2
Abhinav Kumar	3	3	123	41.00	75.00	110	1	0

- Source: ESPNcricinfo

Most wickets

Player	Mat	Inns	Wkts	Ave	Econ	BBI	SR	4WI	5WI
Sankinani Vishnuvardhan	5	5	6	31.00	4.39	2/22	42.3	0	0
Shivaji Yadav	3	3	5	23.20	4.14	2/34	33.6	0	0
Inder Shekar Reddy	5	5	5	37.60	4.08	3/50	55.2	0	0

- Source: ESPNcricinfo

== See also ==
- Hyderabad cricket team
- Hyderabad Cricket Association
