= 2001–02 Hyderabad C.A. season =

Hyderabad C.A.
2001–02 season
- Coach: Arshad Ayub
- Captain: Venkatapathy Raju
- Ground(s): Gymkhana Ground, Hyderabad
- Ranji Trophy: Quarter-finals
- Ranji One–Day Trophy: South Zone (3rd)

The 2001–02 season is Hyderabad cricket team's 68th competitive season. The Hyderabad cricket team is senior men's domestic cricket team based in the city of Hyderabad, India, run by the Hyderabad Cricket Association. They represent the region of Telangana in the state of Andhra Pradesh in domestic competitions.

== Competition overview ==
Category	Competition	Format	First match	Last match	Final position	Pld	W	L	D / T / NR	Win %
Senior men's	Ranji Trophy	First-class cricket	21 November 2001	5 February 2002	Quarter-finals	7	2	1	4	28.57%
Senior men's	Ranji One–Day Trophy	List A cricket	3 January 2002	8 January 2002	Zonal Stage	5	3	2	0	60%

== Squads ==
- Head Coach: Arshad Ayub

Ranji Trophy	Ranji One–Day Trophy
Venkatapathy Raju (c); Anirudh Singh; Gangashetty Arvind Kumar; Mohammad Ghouse Baba; V. V. S. Laxman; Daniel Manohar; Nand Kishore; Vanka Pratap; Ambati Rayudu; Inder Shekar Reddy; Rohit Sabharwal; Narender Pal Singh; Mangalapally Srinivas; Devishetty Vinay Kumar; Sankinani Vishnuvardhan; Arjun Yadav; Shivaji Yadav	Venkatapathy Raju (c); Anirudh Singh; Gangashetty Arvind Kumar; Noel David; Nand Kishore; Pawan Kumar; Ambati Rayudu; Inder Shekar Reddy; Rohit Sabharwal; Narender Pal Singh; Devishetty Vinay Kumar; Sankinani Vishnuvardhan; Arjun Yadav; Shivaji Yadav

Irani Cup

Laxman got selected to the Rest of India squad for the 2001 Irani Cup, a first-class cricket competition in India.

NKP Salve Challenger Trophy

Laxman and Manohar got picked to the India A squad while Arjun got picked to the India B squad for the 2001-02 NKP Salve Challenger Trophy, a List-A cricket tournament in India.

Deodhar Trophy

Manohar, Vinay Kumar and Arjun got selected to the South Zone squad for the 2001-02 Deodhar Trophy, a List-A cricket competition in India.

Duleep Trophy

Nand Kishore, Vinay Kumar and Arjun got selected to the South Zone squad for the 2001-02 Duleep Trophy, a first-class cricket tournament in India.

== Ranji Trophy ==
The Hyderabad team, led by Venkatapathy Raju, began their campaign in the Ranji Trophy, the premier first-class cricket tournament in India, with a draw against the Karnataka at Hyderabad on 21 November 2001. They finished inside top-3 in the South Zone to advance to the knockout stage with a win and four draws. They were eliminated in the quarter-finals where the Baroda defeated the Hyderabad by an innings and 256 runs.

=== Points Table ===
South Zone

Team	Pld	W	L	D	A	Pts
Andhra	5	1	0	4	0	28
Tamil Nadu	5	1	0	4	0	26
Hyderabad	5	1	0	4	0	24
Karnataka	5	2	1	2	0	22
Goa	5	1	2	2	0	14
Kerala	5	0	3	2	0	6

- Top three teams advanced to the knockout stage.
- Points system : Win = 8, Draw with first innings lead = 5, No Result = 3, Draw with first innings deficit = 3, Loss = 0.

=== Knockout stage ===
Pre-Quarterfinals
SZ2	Tamil Nadu	182 & 272
WZ1	Mumbai	186 & 129
CZ1	Railways	497 & 314/4
NZ1	Delhi	395
CZ3	Rajasthan	321 & 146
EZ1	Bengal	518
WZ3	Gujarat	499 & 175/8
SZ1	Andhra	456
NZ3	Himachal Pradesh	192 & 238
SZ3	Hyderabad	403 & 31/0
WZ2	Baroda (Note: Baroda got bye in Round of 16 on the virtue of winning 2000–01 Ranji Trophy.)
bye
EZ3	Assam	170 & 200
NZ2	Punjab	357 & 15/0
CZ2	Uttar Pradesh	231 & 369/9d
EZ2	Orissa	320 & 284/7

Quarterfinals
SZ2	Tamil Nadu	276 & 326/6d
CZ1	Railways	423 & 180/2
EZ1	Bengal	353 & 483/6d
WZ3	Gujarat	321 & 69/5
SZ3	Hyderabad	290 & 127
WZ2	Baroda	673
NZ2	Punjab	207 & 460
EZ2	Orissa	205 & 219

Semifinals
CZ1	Railways	557 & 380/3d
EZ1	Bengal	325
WZ2	Baroda	222 & 233
NZ2	Punjab	237 & 82

Final
CZ1	Railways	253 & 306
WZ2	Baroda	169 & 113

=== Matches ===
Zonal Stage

21–24 November 2001	Hyderabad	v	Karnataka	Match Drawn Hyderabad took first innings lead
Scorecard	577 (172.5 overs); Nand Kishore 214 (407); Anand Katti 4/133 (38 overs)		416 (160.2 overs); Thilak Naidu 101 (225); Shivaji Yadav 4/106 (41 overs)	Gymkhana Ground, Hyderabad; Umpires: Surya Prakash Rao and Des Raj
Scorecard	64/2 (13 overs); Arjun Yadav 21* (30); Dodda Ganesh 2/30 (6 overs)			Gymkhana Ground, Hyderabad; Umpires: Surya Prakash Rao and Des Raj
Hyderabad won the toss and elected to bat

2–5 December 2001	Hyderabad	v	Kerala	Hyderabad won by 144 runs
Scorecard	117 (58.3 overs); Daniel Manohar 35 (100); M. Suresh Kumar 4/36 (15.3 overs)		125 (56.1 overs); Sunil Oasis 47 (115); Venkatapathy Raju 6/42 (23 overs)	Jawaharlal Nehru Stadium, Kochi; Umpires: Ganesh Ayyar and K D Doodhwala
Scorecard	334/9d (131.5 overs); Anirudh Singh 124 (232); M. Suresh Kumar 4/115 (53 overs)		182 (99.1 overs); Manimandiran Sorab 56 (205); Venkatapathy Raju 5/66 (33.1 overs)	Jawaharlal Nehru Stadium, Kochi; Umpires: Ganesh Ayyar and K D Doodhwala
Hyderabad won the toss and elected to bat

10–13 December 2001	Hyderabad	v	Tamil Nadu	Match Drawn Tamil Nadu took first innings lead
Scorecard	336 (140.3 overs); Devishetty Vinay Kumar 103* (317); MR Shrinivas 4/67 (32.3 overs)		351 (166.5 overs); Thirugnanasambandam Arasu 78 (268); Narender Pal Singh 4/95 (39 overs)	Chemplast Cricket Ground, Chennai; Umpires: Subrata Banerjee and Subrata Guha
Scorecard	150/2 (46 overs); Daniel Manohar 65* (127); Ramakrishnan Ramkumar 2/72 (20 overs)			Chemplast Cricket Ground, Chennai; Umpires: Subrata Banerjee and Subrata Guha
Hyderabad won the toss and elected to bat

18–21 December 2001	Goa	v	Hyderabad	Match Drawn Hyderabad took first innings lead
Scorecard	306 (117.5 overs); AA Velaskar 87 (179); Venkatapathy Raju 3/35 (26.5 overs)		400 (135 overs); Arjun Yadav 155 (306); Saiyed Khalid 4/95 (42 overs)	Panjim Gymkhana Ground, Panaji; Umpires: DD Sharma and Kamal Juneja
Scorecard	263/6 (97.2 overs); Kiran Powar 101* (142); Shivaji Yadav 3/75 (26.2 overs)			Panjim Gymkhana Ground, Panaji; Umpires: DD Sharma and Kamal Juneja
Hyderabad won the toss and elected to field

25–28 December 2001	Andhra	v	Hyderabad	Match Drawn Andhra took first innings lead
Scorecard	365 (151.4 overs); Yalaka Venugopal Rao 146 (395); Sankinani Vishnuvardhan 4/92 (33 overs)		180 (83.3 overs); Nand Kishore 54 (208); Hemal Watekar 3/31 (20.3 overs)	Gymkhana Ground, Hyderabad; Umpires: AY Gokhale and Suresh Shastri
Scorecard			237/6 (124 overs) (f/o); Nand Kishore 70 (234); R Prasad 2/48 (26 overs)	Gymkhana Ground, Hyderabad; Umpires: AY Gokhale and Suresh Shastri
Andhra won the toss and elected to bat

Prequarter-final

23–26 January 2002	Himachal Pradesh	v	Hyderabad	Hyderabad won by 10 wickets
Scorecard	192 (67.1 overs); Nischal Gaur 99 (208); Narender Pal Singh 5/27 (20.1 overs)		403 (149.3 overs); Daniel Manohar 111 (305); Shakti Singh 4/78 (43.3 overs)	Gymkhana Ground, Hyderabad; Umpires: V. M. Gupte and SK Sathe
Scorecard	238 (83.2 overs); Nischal Gaur 73 (129); Shivaji Yadav 5/91 (31 overs)		31/0 (5.3 overs); Daniel Manohar 16* (15)	Gymkhana Ground, Hyderabad; Umpires: V. M. Gupte and SK Sathe
Himachal Pradesh won the toss and elected to bat

Quarter-final

5–8 February 2002	Hyderabad	v	Baroda	Baroda won by an innings and 256 runs
Scorecard	290 (79.1 overs); V. V. S. Laxman 101 (151); Zaheer Khan 5/115 (22.1 overs)		673 (169.1 overs); Jacob Martin 271 (404); Sankinani Vishnuvardhan 6/148 (37.1 overs)	GSFC Cricket Ground, Vadodara; Umpires: Vijay Chopra and Sudhir Asnani
Scorecard	127 (32.1 overs); V. V. S. Laxman 53* (101); Zaheer Khan 5/30 (10 overs)			GSFC Cricket Ground, Vadodara; Umpires: Vijay Chopra and Sudhir Asnani
Baroda won the toss and elected to field

=== Statistics ===
Most runs

Player	Mat	Inns	Runs	Ave	SR	HS	100	50
Nand Kishore	7	12	534	48.54	39.49	214	1	3
Arjun Yadav	7	12	470	47.00	47.76	155	1	2
Daniel Manohar	7	12	401	40.10	36.68	111	2	1

- Source: ESPNcricinfo

Most wickets

Player	Mat	Ovrs	Wkts	Ave	Econ	BBI	SR	5WI	10WM
Shivaji Yadav	7	305.3	23	31.69	2.38	5/91	79.6	1	0
Narender Pal Singh	7	262.1	22	29.90	2.50	5/27	71.5	1	0
Venkatapathy Raju	7	309	21	29.04	1.97	6/42	88.2	2	1

- Source: ESPNcricinfo

== Ranji One–Day Trophy ==
The Hyderabad team, led by Venkatapathy Raju, began their campaign in the Subbaiah Pillai Trophy as part of the South Zone Ranji One–Day Trophy, a List-A cricket tournament in India, with a win against the Andhra at Visakhapatnam on 3 January 2002. The Andhra posted 265 with the help of the half-centuries from Yalaka Venugopal Rao and Prasad Reddy but the good second wicket partnership between Nand Kishore and Devishetty Vinay Kumar along with the swift lower order batting ensured the Hyderabad chase the target with two-wickets to spare. In the second match, the century from J. Arunkumar and the half-century from Vijay Bharadwaj helped the Karnataka post 336. Though the Hyderabad started the chase strongly scoring 140 in 20 overs, middle-order collapse led to the Hyderabad bowl out to 252 despite Vinay Kumar's run-a-ball century. The partnership of 124 runs between Ajay Kudva and Suresh Kumar helped the Kerala post 273 but the half-centuries from Anirudh Singh and Gangashetty Arvind Kumar helped the Hyderabad chase the target with two-wickets to spare in their third match of the tournament. In the fourth match, the Hyderabad batsmen collapsed as none of them could get big score apart from the half-century from Nand Kishore which helped them to recover to 212 but the half-centuries from Jayaraman Madanagopal and Somasetty Suresh helped the Tamil Nadu chase the target with four-wickets to spare. In the final zonal match, 196-run partnership from Ambati Rayudu and Vinay Kumar with both scoring the centuries along with the half-century from Anirudh helped the Hyderabad post 338. In reply, the Goa batsmen were troubled barring the half-century from the opener, Sagun Kamat as the four-wicket haul from Inder Shekar Reddy led to a middle-order collapse for the Goa and ensured a 159-run win for the Hyderabad. Despite the win in the last zonal match, the Hyderabad finished third in the South Zone with three wins and two losses.

=== Points Table ===
South Zone

Team	Pld	W	L	T	NR	Pts
Karnataka	5	4	1	0	0	18
Tamil Nadu	5	3	2	0	0	13
Hyderabad	5	3	2	0	0	13
Andhra	5	3	2	0	0	12
Kerala	5	1	4	0	0	5
Goa	5	1	4	0	0	4

- Top team qualified for the 2002–03 Wills Trophy.

=== Matches ===
Zonal Stage

3 January 2002	Andhra; 265 (50 overs)	v	Hyderabad; 266/8 (49.3 overs)	Hyderabad won by 2 wickets
Report	Andhra; 265 (50 overs)	v	Hyderabad; 266/8 (49.3 overs)	South Eastern Railway Stadium, Visakhapatnam
Report	Yalaka Venugopal Rao 86 (107); Shivaji Yadav 3/58 (10 overs)		Devishetty Vinay Kumar 83 (103)	South Eastern Railway Stadium, Visakhapatnam
Andhra won the toss and elected to bat.; Points : Hyderabad 4; Andhra 0				South Eastern Railway Stadium, Visakhapatnam

4 January 2002	Karnataka; 336/7 (50 overs)	v	Hyderabad; 252 (45.4 overs)	Karnataka won by 84 runs
Report	Karnataka; 336/7 (50 overs)	v	Hyderabad; 252 (45.4 overs)	Indira Priyadarshini Stadium, Vishakapatnam
Report	J. Arunkumar 151 (138)		Devishetty Vinay Kumar 104 (104)	Indira Priyadarshini Stadium, Vishakapatnam
Karnataka won the toss and elected to bat.; Points : Karnataka 5; Hyderabad 0				Indira Priyadarshini Stadium, Vishakapatnam

5 January 2002	Kerala; 273/8 (50 overs)	v	Hyderabad; 274/8 (49.3 overs)	Hyderabad won by 2 wickets
Report	Kerala; 273/8 (50 overs)	v	Hyderabad; 274/8 (49.3 overs)	Ukku Stadium, Vishakapatnam
Report	Ajay Kudva 70; Shivaji Yadav 4/34		Anirudh Singh 86* (80)	Ukku Stadium, Vishakapatnam
Kerala won the toss and elected to bat.; Points : Hyderabad 4; Kerala 0				Ukku Stadium, Vishakapatnam

7 January 2002	Hyderabad; 212/9 (32 overs)	v	Tamil Nadu; 213/6 (31.1 overs)	Tamil Nadu won by 4 wickets
Report	Hyderabad; 212/9 (32 overs)	v	Tamil Nadu; 213/6 (31.1 overs)	Indira Priyadarshini Stadium, Vishakapatnam
Report	Nand Kishore 76 (83)		Jayaraman Madanagopal 63* (73)	Indira Priyadarshini Stadium, Vishakapatnam
Tamil Nadu won the toss and elected to field.; Points : Tamil Nadu 4; Hyderabad 0				Indira Priyadarshini Stadium, Vishakapatnam

8 January 2002	Hyderabad; 338/4 (50 overs)	v	Goa; 179 (48.2 overs)	Hyderabad won by 159 runs
Report	Hyderabad; 338/4 (50 overs)	v	Goa; 179 (48.2 overs)	South Eastern Railway Stadium, Visakhapatnam
Report	Ambati Rayudu 117 (107)		SV Kamat 61 (83); Inder Shekar Reddy 4/24	South Eastern Railway Stadium, Visakhapatnam
Hyderabad won the toss and elected to bat.; Points : Hyderabad 5; Goa 0				South Eastern Railway Stadium, Visakhapatnam

=== Statistics ===
Most runs

Player	Mat	Inns	Runs	Ave	SR	HS	100	50
Devishetty Vinay Kumar	5	5	297	59.40	84.61	104	2	1
Anirudh Singh	5	5	202	67.33	105.75	86*	0	2
Nand Kishore	5	5	187	37.40	89.47	76	0	1

- Source: ESPNcricinfo

Most wickets

Player	Mat	Ovrs	Wkts	Ave	Econ	BBI	SR	4WI	5WI
Shivaji Yadav	5	43	9	23.00	4.81	4/34	28.6	1	0
Sankinani Vishnuvardhan	5	39.1	7	30.71	5.48	3/59	33.5	0	0
Inder Shekar Reddy	3	20	6	16.33	4.90	4/24	20.0	1	0

- Source: ESPNcricinfo

== See also ==
- Hyderabad cricket team
- Hyderabad Cricket Association
