= 2002–03 Hyderabad C.A. season =

Hyderabad C.A.
2002–03 season
- Captain: Venkatapathy Raju
- Ground(s): Gymkhana Ground, Hyderabad
- Ranji Trophy: Elite Group A (4th)
- Ranji One–Day Trophy: South Zone (3rd)

The 2002–03 season is Hyderabad cricket team's 69th competitive season. The Hyderabad cricket team is senior men's domestic cricket team based in the city of Hyderabad, India, run by the Hyderabad Cricket Association. They represent the region of Telangana in the state of Andhra Pradesh in domestic competitions.

== Competition overview ==
Category	Competition	Format	First match	Last match	Final position	Pld	W	L	D / T / NR	Win %
Senior men's	Ranji Trophy	First-class cricket	9 November 2002	1 February 2003	Elite Group Stage	7	1	2	4	14.28%
Senior men's	Ranji One–Day Trophy	List A cricket	6 December 2002	11 December 2002	Zonal Stage	5	3	2	0	60%

== Squads ==
Ranji Trophy	Ranji One–Day Trophy
Venkatapathy Raju (c); Anirudh Singh; Gangashetty Arvind Kumar; Ibrahim Khaleel (wk); V. V. S. Laxman; Daniel Manohar; Nand Kishore; Ambati Rayudu; Inder Shekar Reddy; Narender Pal Singh; Devishetty Vinay Kumar; Sankinani Vishnuvardhan; Arjun Yadav; Shivaji Yadav	Venkatapathy Raju (c); Arjun Yadav; Ambati Rayudu; Anirudh Singh; Devishetty Vinay Kumar; Ibrahim Khaleel (wk); Faiz Ahmed; Tirumalasetti Suman; Inder Shekar Reddy; Mohammad Ghouse Baba; Abhinav Kumar; Mohammad Nadeemuddin; Anoop Pai; Shashank Nag; Syed Quadri; Imran

Irani Cup

Rayudu got selected to the Rest of India squad for the 2002 Irani Cup, a first-class cricket competition in India.

Deodhar Trophy

Rayudu, Vinay Kumar and Arjun got selected to the South Zone squad for the 2002-03 Deodhar Trophy, a List-A cricket competition in India.

Duleep Trophy

Manohar got selected to the Elite–A squad while Arjun got selected to the Elite–B squad for the 2002–03 Duleep Trophy, a first-class cricket tournament in India.

== Ranji Trophy ==
The Hyderabad team, led by Venkatapathy Raju, began their campaign in the Ranji Trophy, the premier first-class cricket tournament in India, with a loss against the Mumbai at Hyderabad on 9 November 2002. They finished fourth in Group A of the Elite Group and failed to qualify for the knockout stage with a win, two losses and four draws. The teenage sensation, Ambati Rayudu emerged as the second highest run-getter by the end of the elite group-stage.

=== Points Table ===
Elite Group A

Team	Pld	W	L	D	A	Pts
Mumbai	7	5	0	2	0	13
Delhi	7	2	1	4	0	8
Andhra	7	2	2	3	0	5
Hyderabad	7	1	2	4	0	5
Rajasthan	7	2	2	2	1	4
Bengal	7	1	2	3	1	3
Railways	7	0	2	4	1	3
Himachal Pradesh	7	0	2	4	1	1

- Top two teams advanced to the knockout stage.
- Bottom team relegated to the Plate Group for the 2003–04 Ranji Trophy.
- Points system : Win by an innings or 10 wickets = 3, Win = 2, Draw with first innings lead = 1, No Result = 0, Draw with first innings deficit = 0, Loss = 0.

=== Matches ===
Group Stage

9–12 November 2002	Mumbai	v	Hyderabad	Mumbai won by 69 runs
Scorecard	98 (36.4 overs); Vinayak Mane 18 (44); Narender Pal Singh 6/37 (14.4 overs)		130 (53.5 overs); Nand Kishore 34 (69); Aavishkar Salvi 5/40 (24 overs)	Gymkhana Ground, Hyderabad; Umpires: Jasbir Singh and Vijay Chopra
Scorecard	337 (124 overs); Vinayak Mane 83 (192); Daniel Manohar 3/59 (21 overs)		236 (98.5 overs); Shivaji Yadav 78* (199); Ramesh Powar 3/25 (11 overs)	Gymkhana Ground, Hyderabad; Umpires: Jasbir Singh and Vijay Chopra
Mumbai won the toss and elected to bat.; Nilesh Patwardhan and Milind Tamhane (Mumbai); Ibrahim Khaleel (Hyderabad) all made their first-class debuts.

17–20 November 2002	Hyderabad	v	Andhra	Match Drawn Hyderabad took first innings lead
Scorecard	353 (88.1 overs); Ambati Rayudu 210 (232); Syed Shahabuddin 3/116 (26.1 overs)		352 (116.5 overs); M. S. K. Prasad 130 (202); Shivaji Yadav 5/87 (29.3 overs)	Gymkhana Ground, Hyderabad; Umpires: Devendra Sharma and Surya Prakash Rao
Scorecard	374/6d (84 overs); Ambati Rayudu 159* (161); Venkata Appa Rao 2/65 (14 overs)		211/5 (65 overs); M. S. K. Prasad 69* (135); Shivaji Yadav 3/69 (22 overs)	Gymkhana Ground, Hyderabad; Umpires: Devendra Sharma and Surya Prakash Rao
Andhra won the toss and elected to field.; M Shyamsunder and Venkata Appa Rao (Andhra) made their first-class debuts.

27–30 November 2002	Hyderabad	v	Rajasthan	Rajasthan won by 4 wickets
Scorecard	212 (66 overs); Gangashetty Arvind Kumar 94 (151); Sumit Mathur 5/56 (15 overs)		371 (122.3 overs); Nikhil Doru 122 (288); Sankinani Vishnuvardhan 4/65 (21.3 overs)	KL Saini Ground, Jaipur; Umpires: C. R. Mohite and Sameer Bandekar
Scorecard	350 (100.2 overs); Daniel Manohar 101 (250); Rahul Kanwat 5/37 (17 overs)		195/6 (61.5 overs); Gagan Khoda 51 (92); Venkatapathy Raju 4/47 (20 overs)	KL Saini Ground, Jaipur; Umpires: C. R. Mohite and Sameer Bandekar
Hyderabad won the toss and elected to bat.

19–22 December 2002	Hyderabad	v	Bengal	Match Drawn Hyderabad took first innings lead
Scorecard	395 (128.1 overs); Ambati Rayudu 134 (165); Saurasish Lahiri 5/66 (25.1 overs)		313 (102.5 overs); Laxmi Ratan Shukla 84* (125); Sankinani Vishnuvardhan 3/54 (25 overs)	Gymkhana Ground, Hyderabad; Umpires: Vijay Chopra and Krishna Hariharan
Scorecard	238/5d (56 overs); Daniel Manohar 119 (179); Utpal Chatterjee 3/50 (15 overs)		248/8 (67.5 overs); Devang Gandhi 72 (83); Shivaji Yadav 4/69 (23 overs)	Gymkhana Ground, Hyderabad; Umpires: Vijay Chopra and Krishna Hariharan
Bengal won the toss and elected to field.

28–31 December 2002	Himachal Pradesh	v	Hyderabad	Match Drawn Hyderabad took first innings lead
Scorecard	262 (104.5 overs); Arjun Yadav 72* (253); Shakti Singh 6/75 (34.5 overs)		168 (99.2 overs); Rajeev Nayyar 54 (205); Shivaji Yadav 6/51 (32.2 overs)	Luhnu Cricket Ground, Bilaspur; Umpires: Abhijit Deshmukh and Amiesh Saheba
Scorecard	91/0 (28.1 overs); Daniel Manohar 43* (85)			Luhnu Cricket Ground, Bilaspur; Umpires: Abhijit Deshmukh and Amiesh Saheba
Hyderabad won the toss and elected to bat.

25–28 January 2003	Hyderabad	v	Railways	Hyderabad won by 9 wickets
Scorecard	355 (107 overs); Daniel Manohar 107 (183); Harvinder Singh 5/90 (33 overs)		131 (45.4 overs); Yere Goud 48 (98); Shivaji Yadav 4/34 (12 overs)	Gymkhana Ground, Hyderabad; Umpires: Subroto Porel and Aloke Bhattacharjee
Scorecard	70/1 (20.1 overs); Daniel Manohar 46* (54); Murali Karthik 1/10 (6 overs)		290 (84.2 overs) (f/o); Murali Karthik 64 (103); Sankinani Vishnuvardhan 6/55 (20.2 overs)	Gymkhana Ground, Hyderabad; Umpires: Subroto Porel and Aloke Bhattacharjee
Railways won the toss and elected to field.

1–4 February 2003	Hyderabad	v	Delhi	Match Drawn Delhi took first innings lead
Scorecard	297/9d (103 overs); Devishetty Vinay Kumar 96 (263); Amit Bhandari 4/80 (23 overs)		492/8d (117.5 overs); Gautam Gambhir 174 (256); Narender Pal Singh 2/71 (15 overs)	Feroz Shah Kotla, Delhi; Umpires: Subroto Porel and SN Bandokar
Scorecard	106/2 (30.1 overs); Ambati Rayudu 31* (48); Kuldeep Rawat 1/24 (6 overs)			Feroz Shah Kotla, Delhi; Umpires: Subroto Porel and SN Bandokar
Hyderabad won the toss and elected to bat.

=== Statistics ===
Most runs

Player	Mat	Inns	Runs	Ave	SR	HS	100	50
Ambati Rayudu	7	12	698	69.80	82.11	210	3	2
Daniel Manohar	7	14	633	52.75	51.00	119	3	2
Nand Kishore	7	14	395	32.91	50.12	100	1	1

- Source: ESPNcricinfo

Most wickets

Player	Mat	Ovrs	Wkts	Ave	Econ	BBI	SR	5WI	10WM
Shivaji Yadav	7	234.2	28	26.14	3.12	6/51	50.2	2	0
Narender Pal Singh	7	213.2	27	26.18	3.31	6/37	47.4	1	0
Sankinani Vishnuvardhan	6	198.1	21	28.04	2.97	6/55	56.6	1	0

- Source: ESPNcricinfo

== Ranji One–Day Trophy ==
The Hyderabad team, led by Venkatapathy Raju, began their campaign in the Subbaiah Pillai Trophy as part of the South Zone Ranji One–Day Trophy, a List-A cricket tournament in India, with a loss against the Tamil Nadu at Bangalore on 6 December 2002. The partnership from Arjun Yadav and Devishetty Vinay Kumar helped the Hyderabad to a slow recovery from the initial collapse but wickets at the end restricted them to 205 while the century from Sridharan Sriram completed the chase for the Tamil Nadu with six-wickets to spare. In the second match, the five-wicket haul from Inder Shekar Reddy helped the Hyderabad bowl out the Karnataka to 120. The Hyderabad suffered an initial collapse at the chase but an unbeaten 45-run knock from Vinay Kumar guided the Hyderabad win by four wickets. In the third match, the three-wicket by Mohammad Nadeemuddin triggered the initial collapse and helped the Hyderabad restrict the Andhra to 210 while the century from Tirumalasetti Suman along with the half-century from Ambati Rayudu helped the Hyderabad complete the chase with seven-wickets to spare. The Hyderabad defeated the Goa by three wickets in their fourth match of the tournament after the half-centuries from Suman and Vinay Kumar helped the Hyderabad chase the target of 268 set by the Goa with the help of 89-run knock from Swapnil Asnodkar. In the final zonal match, the century from Sujith Somasunder along with the half-century from Hemanth Kumar helped the Kerala set the target of 298 while the three-wicket haul from K. N. Ananthapadmanabhan bowled the Hyderabad out for 247 despite 98-run knock from Vinay Kumar and another half-century from Ibrahim Khaleel. This loss resulted in the Hyderabad finish third in South Zone and fail to qualify for the Ranji ODI Championship with three wins and two losses.

=== Points Table ===
South Zone

Team	Pld	W	L	T	NR	Pts
Tamil Nadu	5	4	1	0	0	19
Karnataka	5	4	1	0	0	18
Hyderabad	5	3	2	0	0	13
Goa	5	2	3	0	0	10
Kerala	5	2	3	0	0	8
Andhra	5	0	5	0	0	0

- Top team advanced to the Ranji ODI Championship

=== Matches ===
Zonal Stage

6 December 2002	Hyderabad; 205 (49 overs)	v	Tamil Nadu; 209/4 (40 overs)	Tamil Nadu won by 6 wickets
Scorecard	Hyderabad; 205 (49 overs)	v	Tamil Nadu; 209/4 (40 overs)	Maharaja Jayachamaraja Wodayar Sports Centre, Bangalore; Umpires: Aloke Bhattacharjee and Subrata Guha
Scorecard	Devishetty Vinay Kumar 54 (96); Ganapathi Vignesh 3/39 (9 overs)		Sridharan Sriram 103 (110); Faiz Ahmed 2/39 (9 overs)	Maharaja Jayachamaraja Wodayar Sports Centre, Bangalore; Umpires: Aloke Bhattacharjee and Subrata Guha
Tamil Nadu won the toss and elected to field.; Points : Tamil Nadu 5; Hyderabad 0				Maharaja Jayachamaraja Wodayar Sports Centre, Bangalore; Umpires: Aloke Bhattacharjee and Subrata Guha

7 December 2002	Karnataka; 120 (35 overs)	v	Hyderabad; 123/6 (37 overs)	Hyderabad won by 4 wickets
Scorecard	Karnataka; 120 (35 overs)	v	Hyderabad; 123/6 (37 overs)	M. Chinnaswamy Stadium, Bangalore; Umpires: VD Nerurkar and VM Bandiwadekar
Scorecard	Balachandra Akhil 33 (48); Inder Shekar Reddy 5/28 (9 overs)		Devishetty Vinay Kumar 45* (92); Anil Kumble 3/28 (10 overs)	M. Chinnaswamy Stadium, Bangalore; Umpires: VD Nerurkar and VM Bandiwadekar
Karnataka won the toss and elected to bat.; Points : Hyderabad 5; Karnataka 0				M. Chinnaswamy Stadium, Bangalore; Umpires: VD Nerurkar and VM Bandiwadekar

8 December 2002	Andhra; 210/8 (50 overs)	v	Hyderabad; 211/3 (47.2 overs)	Hyderabad won by 7 wickets
Scorecard	Andhra; 210/8 (50 overs)	v	Hyderabad; 211/3 (47.2 overs)	Wheel and Axle Plant, Bangalore; Umpires: Sudhir Asnani and Surya Prakash Rao
Scorecard	Syed Shahabuddin 43 (29); Mohammad Nadeemuddin 3/26 (8 overs)		Tirumalasetti Suman 104 (137); Hemal Watekar 1/25 (7 overs)	Wheel and Axle Plant, Bangalore; Umpires: Sudhir Asnani and Surya Prakash Rao
Andhra won the toss and elected to bat.; Points : Hyderabad 4; Andhra 0				Wheel and Axle Plant, Bangalore; Umpires: Sudhir Asnani and Surya Prakash Rao

10 December 2002	Goa; 267/7 (47 overs)	v	Hyderabad; 271/7 (46.4 overs)	Hyderabad won by 3 wickets
Scorecard	Goa; 267/7 (47 overs)	v	Hyderabad; 271/7 (46.4 overs)	Maharaja Jayachamaraja Wodayar Sports Centre, Bangalore; Umpires: B. Jamula and V. M. Gupte
Scorecard	Swapnil Asnodkar 89 (133); Inder Shekar Reddy 2/40 (10 overs)		Tirumalasetti Suman 89 (101); Shadab Jakati 2/22 (4 overs)	Maharaja Jayachamaraja Wodayar Sports Centre, Bangalore; Umpires: B. Jamula and V. M. Gupte
Hyderabad won the toss and elected to field.; Points : Hyderabad 4; Goa 0				Maharaja Jayachamaraja Wodayar Sports Centre, Bangalore; Umpires: B. Jamula and V. M. Gupte

11 December 2002	Kerala; 292 (50 overs)	v	Hyderabad; 247 (46.2 overs)	Kerala won by 45 runs
Scorecard	Kerala; 292 (50 overs)	v	Hyderabad; 247 (46.2 overs)	Wheel and Axle Plant, Bangalore; Umpires: B. Jamula and M. R. Singh
Scorecard	Sujith Somasunder 124 (147); Mohammad Ghouse Baba 3/41 (9 overs)		Devishetty Vinay Kumar 98 (111); K. N. Ananthapadmanabhan 3/37 (8.2 overs)	Wheel and Axle Plant, Bangalore; Umpires: B. Jamula and M. R. Singh
Kerala won the toss and elected to bat.; Points : Kerala 4; Hyderabad 0				Wheel and Axle Plant, Bangalore; Umpires: B. Jamula and M. R. Singh

=== Statistics ===
Most runs

Player	Mat	Inns	Runs	Ave	SR	HS	100	50
Devishetty Vinay Kumar	5	5	275	91.66	77.03	98	0	3
Tirumalasetti Suman	5	5	209	41.80	76.55	104	1	1
Arjun Yadav	5	5	112	22.40	52.09	47	0	0

- Source: ESPNcricinfo

Most wickets

Player	Mat	Ovrs	Wkts	Ave	Econ	BBI	SR	4WI	5WI
Inder Shekar Reddy	5	45	9	17.88	3.57	5/28	30.0	0	1
Faiz Ahmed	5	46	9	22.33	4.36	2/31	30.6	0	0
Mohammad Ghouse Baba	5	42	8	26.87	5.11	3/41	31.5	0	0

- Source: ESPNcricinfo

== See also ==
- Hyderabad cricket team
- Hyderabad Cricket Association
