= 2003–04 Hyderabad C.A. season =

Hyderabad C.A.
2003–04 season
- Captain: Venkatapathy Raju
- Ground(s): Gymkhana Ground, Hyderabad
- Ranji Trophy: Semi-finals
- Ranji One–Day Trophy: South Zone (5th)

The 2003–04 season is Hyderabad cricket team's 70th competitive season. The Hyderabad cricket team is senior men's domestic cricket team based in the city of Hyderabad, India, run by the Hyderabad Cricket Association. They represent the region of Telangana in the state of Andhra Pradesh in domestic competitions.

== Competition overview ==
Category	Competition	Format	First match	Last match	Final position	Pld	W	L	D / T / NR	Win %
Senior men's	Ranji Trophy	First-class cricket	7 November 2003	14 March 2004	Semi-finals	7	3	2	2	42.85%
Senior men's	Ranji One–Day Trophy	List A cricket	7 January 2004	12 January 2004	Zonal Stage	5	1	4	0	20%

== Squads ==
Ranji Trophy	Ranji One–Day Trophy
Venkatapathy Raju (c); Anirudh Singh; Gangashetty Arvind Kumar; Faiz Ahmed; Ibrahim Khaleel (wk); Daniel Manohar; Nand Kishore; Narender Pal Singh; Ambati Rayudu; Inder Shekar Reddy; Tirumalasetti Suman; Devishetty Vinay Kumar; Sankinani Vishnuvardhan; Arjun Yadav; Shivaji Yadav	Venkatapathy Raju (c); Anirudh Singh; Faiz Ahmed; Ibrahim Khaleel (wk); Daniel Manohar; Mohammad Ghouse Baba; Narender Pal Singh; Shashank Nag; Inder Shekar Reddy; Tirumalasetti Suman; Devishetty Vinay Kumar; Sankinani Vishnuvardhan; Arjun Yadav; Shivaji Yadav

NKP Salve Challenger Trophy

Laxman and Rayudu got picked to the India Seniors squad for the 2003-04 NKP Salve Challenger Trophy, a List-A cricket tournament in India.

Irani Cup

Laxman got selected to the Rest of India squad for the 2003 Irani Cup, a first-class cricket competition in India.

Deodhar Trophy

Arjun, Vishnuvardhan and Khaleel got selected to the South Zone squad for the 2003-04 Deodhar Trophy, a List-A cricket competition in India.

Duleep Trophy

Khaleel got selected to the South Zone squad for the 2003-04 Duleep Trophy, a first-class cricket tournament in India.

== Ranji Trophy ==
The Hyderabad team, led by Venkatapathy Raju, began their campaign in the Ranji Trophy, the premier first-class cricket tournament in India, with a win against the Gujarat at Ahmedabad on 7 November 2003. They finished inside top-2 in Group B of the Elite League to advance to the Elite semi-final with three wins, a loss and two draws. They were eliminated in the semi-final where the Mumbai defeated the Hyderabad by an innings and 152 runs.

=== Points Table ===
Elite Group B

Team	Pld	W	L	D	A	Pts
Hyderabad	6	3	1	2	0	15
Tamil Nadu	6	3	0	3	0	15
Karnataka	6	3	2	1	0	15
Bengal	6	1	1	4	0	9
Gujarat	6	2	2	2	0	8
Assam	6	1	3	2	0	6
Rajasthan	6	1	5	0	0	4

- Top two teams advanced to the knockout stage.
- Bottom team relegated to the Plate Group for the 2004–05 Ranji Trophy.
- Points system : Win by an innings or 10 wickets = 5, Win = 4, Draw with first innings lead = 2, No Result = 2, Draw with first innings deficit = 0, Loss = 0.

=== Knockout stage ===
Semifinals
B2	Tamil Nadu	481 & 306
A2	Railways	342 & 117/5
B1	Hyderabad	166 & 158
A1	Mumbai	476

Final
B2	Tamil Nadu	294 & 353/4
A1	Mumbai	613

=== Matches ===
Group Stage

7–10 November 2003	Hyderabad	v	Gujarat	Hyderabad won by 150 runs
Scorecard	245 (95.2 overs); Devishetty Vinay Kumar 76 (220); Lalit Patel 5/58 (23.2 overs)		129 (69.1 overs); L Pawar 40 (167); Narender Pal Singh 6/33 (20 overs)	Sardar Patel Stadium, Ahmedabad; Umpires: M. S. Mahal and Jasbir Singh
Scorecard	185 (67 overs); Daniel Manohar 45 (109); Siddharth Trivedi 4/45 (20 overs)		151 (66.5 overs); Niraj Patel 25 (85); Venkatapathy Raju 4/15 (14 overs)	Sardar Patel Stadium, Ahmedabad; Umpires: M. S. Mahal and Jasbir Singh
Hyderabad won the toss and elected to bat.; Tirumalasetti Suman (Hyderabad) made his first-class debut.

23–26 November 2003	Assam	v	Hyderabad	Match Drawn
Scorecard	537/9d (180.3 overs); Rajagopal Satish 133* (242); Shivaji Yadav 5/140 (48 overs)		410/9 (193 overs); Arjun Yadav 91 (228); Arlen Konwar 6/141 (65 overs)	Nehru Stadium, Guwahati; Umpires: M. R. Singh and Surya Prakash Rao
Assam won the toss and elected to bat.

1–4 December 2003	Hyderabad	v	Karnataka	Hyderabad won by 297 runs
Scorecard	177 (63.3 overs); Devishetty Vinay Kumar 65 (154); Neravanda Aiyappa 3/51 (15 overs)		100 (47.4 overs); Barrington Rowland 28 (92); Narender Pal Singh 6/31 (19.4 overs)	Gymkhana Ground, Hyderabad; Umpires: Narendra Menon and Sameer Bandekar
Scorecard	309 (97.3 overs); Ibrahim Khaleel 72 (140); Dodda Ganesh 3/74 (29 overs)		89 (32.3 overs); Dodda Ganesh 20 (28); Faiz Ahmed 6/29 (10 overs)	Gymkhana Ground, Hyderabad; Umpires: Narendra Menon and Sameer Bandekar
Hyderabad won the toss and elected to bat.

9–12 December 2003	Hyderabad	v	Bengal	Bengal won by an innings and 1 run
Scorecard	252 (108.5 overs); Ibrahim Khaleel 66 (251); Utpal Chatterjee 8/54 (42.5 overs)		388 (145.3 overs); Arindam Das 91 (286); Shivaji Yadav 5/124 (50 overs)	Eden Gardens, Kolkata; Umpires: Surya Prakash Rao and Tej Handu
Scorecard	135 (54.3 overs); Devishetty Vinay Kumar 25 (60); Saurasish Lahiri 4/26 (10 overs)			Eden Gardens, Kolkata; Umpires: Surya Prakash Rao and Tej Handu
Hyderabad won the toss and elected to bat.; Sandip Sanyal (Bengal) made his first-class debut.

17–20 December 2003	Hyderabad	v	Tamil Nadu	Match Drawn Hyderabad took first innings lead
Scorecard	447 (140 overs); Devishetty Vinay Kumar 93 (296); D. J. Gokulakrishnan 3/77 (21 overs)		240 (101.1 overs); Sridharan Sriram 58 (116); Sankinani Vishnuvardhan 5/79 (27 overs)	Gymkhana Ground, Hyderabad; Umpires: S. K. Sharma and Devendra Sharma
Scorecard			239/4 (109 overs) (f/o); Sunil Viswanathan 70* (202); Sankinani Vishnuvardhan 2/58 (23 overs)	Gymkhana Ground, Hyderabad; Umpires: S. K. Sharma and Devendra Sharma
Tamil Nadu won the toss and elected to field.

25–28 December 2003	Hyderabad	v	Rajasthan	Hyderabad won by an innings and 9 runs
Scorecard	389 (108.5 overs); Ambati Rayudu 124 (178); Sumit Mathur 5/124 (32.5 overs)		235 (81.5 overs); Vineet Saxena 62 (208); Narender Pal Singh 6/70 (26.5 overs)	Gymkhana Ground, Hyderabad; Umpires: Vijay Chopra and Francis Gomes
Scorecard			145 (45 overs) (f/o); Gagan Khoda 45 (100); Sankinani Vishnuvardhan 4/51 (21 overs)	Gymkhana Ground, Hyderabad; Umpires: Vijay Chopra and Francis Gomes
Rajasthan won the toss and elected to field.

Semi-final

14–17 March 2004	Hyderabad	v	Mumbai	Mumbai won by an innings and 152 runs
Scorecard	166 (59 overs); Ambati Rayudu 95 (166); Sairaj Bahutule 4/42 (16 overs)		476 (153.2 overs); Vinayak Mane 154 (326); Venkatapathy Raju 6/139 (58.2 overs)	Wankhede Stadium, Mumbai; Umpires: Krishna Hariharan and Jasbir Singh
Scorecard	158 (49.2 overs); Ambati Rayudu 53 (103); Sairaj Bahutule 6/53 (19 overs)			Wankhede Stadium, Mumbai; Umpires: Krishna Hariharan and Jasbir Singh
Hyderabad won the toss and elected to bat.

=== Statistics ===
Most runs

Player	Mat	Inns	Runs	Ave	SR	HS	100	50
Devishetty Vinay Kumar	7	11	397	36.09	36.99	93	0	4
Ibrahim Khaleel	7	11	349	34.90	34.52	89	0	4
Ambati Rayudu	4	6	328	54.66	59.09	124	1	2

- Source: ESPNcricinfo

Most wickets

Player	Mat	Inns	Wkts	Ave	Econ	BBI	SR	5WI	10WM
Narender Pal Singh	7	11	22	23.27	2.54	6/31	54.9	3	0
Sankinani Vishnuvardhan	7	11	18	27.50	2.70	5/79	61.1	1	0
Shivaji Yadav	6	6	18	30.22	2.61	5/124	69.3	2	0

- Source: ESPNcricinfo

== Ranji One–Day Trophy ==
The Hyderabad team, led by Venkatapathy Raju, began their campaign in the Subbaiah Pillai Trophy as part of the South Zone Ranji One–Day Trophy, a List-A cricket tournament in India, with a loss against the Karnataka at Chennai on 7 January 2004. The five-wickets shared between Dodda Ganesh and Sunil Joshi helped the Karnataka restrict the Hyderabad to 155 while the half-centuries from J. Arunkumar and Joshi completed the chase for the Karnataka with seven wickets to spare. In the second match, the half-centuries from Daniel Manohar and Anirudh Singh gave a strong start to the Hyderabad but the middle-order collapse by Renjith Kumar and the run-outs in the end restricted the Hyderabad total to 237 while the Kerala with the help of the half-centuries from Anish Antony and Hemanth Kumar completed the chase in the penultimate ball with three wickets to spare. The half-centuries from Devishetty Vinay Kumar and Sankinani Vishnuvardhan helped the Hyderabad post 268 while the three-wicket hauls from Inder Shekar Reddy and Tirumalasetti Suman helped them win against the Goa by 101 runs in their third match. In the fourth match, the half-century from Subramaniam Badrinath along with the support from Sadagoppan Ramesh and Jayaraman Madanagopal helped the Tamil Nadu post 249. The Hyderabad started the chase strongly with the half-centuries from Shashank Nag and Ibrahim Khaleel along with the support from Manohar but five run-outs at the end resulted in the Hyderabad fall short by 2 runs as they were bowled out for 247. In the final zonal match, the five-wicket haul from Mohammad Ghouse Baba helped the Hyderabad restrict the Andhra to 230 despite the century from Yalaka Venugopal Rao. In reply, the Hyderabad had a big opening partnership from Manohar and Suman but the middle order collapse and tight bowling by the Andhra left the Hyderabad fall short by 8 runs. This loss resulted the Hyderabad finish fourth in South Zone and fail to qualify for the Ranji ODI Championship with a win and four losses.

=== Points Table ===
Team	Pld	W	L	T	NR	Pts
Tamil Nadu	5	4	1	0	0	17
Kerala	5	4	1	0	0	17
Karnataka	5	3	2	0	0	13
Andhra	5	2	3	0	0	7
Hyderabad	5	1	4	0	0	4
Goa	5	1	4	0	0	2

- Top team advanced to the Ranji ODI Championship.

=== Matches ===
Zonal Stage

7 January 2004	Hyderabad; 155 (45.5 overs)	v	Karnataka; 158/3 (36.2 overs)	Karnataka won by 7 wickets
Scorecard	Hyderabad; 155 (45.5 overs)	v	Karnataka; 158/3 (36.2 overs)	M. A. Chidambaram Stadium, Chennai; Umpires: Sarabjit Singh and Vishwas Nerurkar
Scorecard	Ibrahim Khaleel 33 (55); Dodda Ganesh 3/13 (8 overs)		Sunil Joshi 57* (46); Venkatapathy Raju 2/26 (6.2 overs)	M. A. Chidambaram Stadium, Chennai; Umpires: Sarabjit Singh and Vishwas Nerurkar
Hyderabad won the toss and elected to bat.; BM Vinayak Uthappa (Karnataka) made his List-A debut.; Points : Karnataka 5; Hyderabad -1				M. A. Chidambaram Stadium, Chennai; Umpires: Sarabjit Singh and Vishwas Nerurkar

8 January 2004	Hyderabad; 237/9 (50 overs)	v	Kerala; 238/7 (49.5 overs)	Kerala won by 3 wickets
Scorecard	Hyderabad; 237/9 (50 overs)	v	Kerala; 238/7 (49.5 overs)	Ramakrishna Mission Vivekananda College Ground, Chennai; Umpires: Anil Chaudhary and R. P. Singh
Scorecard	Daniel Manohar 87 (105); K Rejith Kumar 4/54 (9 overs)		Anish Antony 61 (117); Inder Shekar Reddy 3/51 (9.5 overs)	Ramakrishna Mission Vivekananda College Ground, Chennai; Umpires: Anil Chaudhary and R. P. Singh
Hyderabad won the toss and elected to bat.; Points : Kerala 4; Hyderabad 0				Ramakrishna Mission Vivekananda College Ground, Chennai; Umpires: Anil Chaudhary and R. P. Singh

10 January 2004	Hyderabad; 268/6 (50 overs)	v	Goa; 167 (47 overs)	Hyderabad won by 101 runs
Scorecard	Hyderabad; 268/6 (50 overs)	v	Goa; 167 (47 overs)	Guru Nanak College Ground, Chennai; Umpires: Darabshah Doodhwala and Anil Chaudhary
Scorecard	Devishetty Vinay Kumar 68* (75); Amit Dani 3/55 (10 overs)		Swapnil Asnodkar 47 (86); Inder Shekar Reddy 3/30 (10 overs)	Guru Nanak College Ground, Chennai; Umpires: Darabshah Doodhwala and Anil Chaudhary
Goa won the toss and elected to field.; A Patnekar and Saurabh Bandekar (Goa) made their List-A debuts.; Points : Hyderabad 5; Goa -1				Guru Nanak College Ground, Chennai; Umpires: Darabshah Doodhwala and Anil Chaudhary

11 January 2004	Tamil Nadu; 249/8 (50 overs)	v	Hyderabad; 247 (49.2 overs)	Tamil Nadu won by 2 runs
Scorecard	Tamil Nadu; 249/8 (50 overs)	v	Hyderabad; 247 (49.2 overs)	M. A. Chidambaram Stadium, Chennai; Umpires: Suhas Phadkar and Marcus Couto
Scorecard	Subramaniam Badrinath 57 (66); Sankinani Vishnuvardhan 3/45 (9 overs)		Ibrahim Khaleel 78 (80); Vidyut Sivaramakrishnan 2/36 (8 overs)	M. A. Chidambaram Stadium, Chennai; Umpires: Suhas Phadkar and Marcus Couto
Hyderabad won the toss and elected to field.; Shashank Nag (Hyderabad) made his List-A debut.; Points : Tamil Nadu 4; Hyderabad 0				M. A. Chidambaram Stadium, Chennai; Umpires: Suhas Phadkar and Marcus Couto

12 January 2004	Andhra; 230/6 (50 overs)	v	Hyderabad; 222 (48.2 overs)	Andhra won by 8 runs
Scorecard	Andhra; 230/6 (50 overs)	v	Hyderabad; 222 (48.2 overs)	Central Polytechnic India Pistons Ground, Chennai; Umpires: Suhas Phadkar and Marcus Couto
Scorecard	Yalaka Venugopal Rao 110* (130); Mohammad Ghouse Baba 5/48 (10 overs)		Daniel Manohar 58 (67); Hemal Watekar 2/28 (10 overs)	Central Polytechnic India Pistons Ground, Chennai; Umpires: Suhas Phadkar and Marcus Couto
Andhra won the toss and elected to bat.; T Nagendra Kumar (Andhra) made his List-A debut.; Points : Andhra 4; Hyderabad 0				Central Polytechnic India Pistons Ground, Chennai; Umpires: Suhas Phadkar and Marcus Couto

=== Statistics ===
Most runs

Player	Mat	Inns	Runs	Ave	SR	HS	100	50
Daniel Manohar	5	5	256	51.20	75.96	87	0	3
Ibrahim Khaleel	5	5	131	43.66	83.43	78	0	1
Devishetty Vinay Kumar	5	5	120	30.00	67.03	68*	0	1

- Source: ESPNcricinfo

Most wickets

Player	Mat	Inns	Wkts	Ave	Econ	BBI	SR	4WI	5WI
Inder Shekar Reddy	5	5	8	26.12	4.27	3/30	36.6	0	0
Mohammad Ghouse Baba	4	4	6	23.83	4.93	5/48	29.0	0	1
Tirumalasetti Suman	5	5	5	22.00	3.92	3/31	33.6	0	0

- Source: ESPNcricinfo

== See also ==
- Hyderabad cricket team
- Hyderabad Cricket Association
