= 1998–99 Ranji Trophy =

- The Ranji Trophy, which the winners get.
- Administrator: BCCI
- Cricket format: First-class cricket
- Tournament format(s): League and knockout
- Champions: Karnataka (6th title)
- Participants: 27
- Most runs: Vijay Bharadwaj (Karnataka) (1280)
- Most wickets: Dodda Ganesh (Karnataka) (62)

The 1998–99 Ranji Trophy was the 65th season of the Ranji Trophy. Karnataka won their third title in four years defeating Madhya Pradesh by 96 runs in the final.

In the final held at M. Chinnaswamy Stadium, Madhya Pradesh gained a first innings lead of 75 runs. The match was interrupted by rain on the fourth day, at the end of which Karnataka declared their second innings at 321 for 7. Madhya Pradesh needed 247 or alternately bat through the last day to win on first innings lead. They chose the latter option and were 130 for 4 wickets at tea. Vijay Bharadwaj dismissed the captain Chandrakant Pandit in the first over after tea and Raja Ali with the first ball of his next over. Harvinder Sodhi scored a 30-minute duck while Bharadwaj had 7-0-13-3 in this spell. In the second over with the new ball, taken after 80 overs, Sunil Joshi dismissed Abbas Ali and Bharadwaj took the last two wickets in a single over.

Bharadwaj's 1280 runs in the season was a new record and as of 2015, is the second highest aggregate.

== Super League ==
=== Final Round - Points table ===
Group A

Team	Played	W	L	FL	FD	NR	Points
Hyderabad	4	1	0	2	1	0	21
Punjab	4	1	1	1	0	1	16
Bengal	4	0	0	2	1	1	16
Rajasthan	4	0	0	1	2	1	14
Baroda	4	0	1	0	2	1	9

- Hyderabad and Punjab qualified for the quarterfinals.
- Punjab qualified over Bengal due to their one outright win over Bengal's none.

Group B

Team	Played	W	L	FL	FD	NR	Points
Tamil Nadu	4	1	0	2	1	0	21
Delhi	4	1	0	1	2	0	19
Maharashtra	4	0	0	3	1	0	18
Orissa	4	0	1	2	1	0	13
Railways	4	0	1	0	3	0	9

- Tamil Nadu and Delhi qualified for the quarterfinals.

Group C

Team	Played	W	L	FL	FD	NR	Points
Karnataka	4	3	0	1	0	0	29
Madhya Pradesh	4	2	0	0	1	1	22
Saurashtra	4	0	2	2	0	0	10
Bihar	4	0	1	0	2	1	9
Haryana	4	0	2	1	1	0	8

- Karnataka and Madhya Pradesh qualified for the semifinals as the two highest scoring teams.

== Knockouts ==
=== Quarterfinal 1 ===
30 March-3 April 1999
Scorecard

Punjab	v	Tamil Nadu
344 (113.5 overs); Navjot Singh Sidhu 124 (238); Sadagoppan Mahesh 5/74 (22.5 overs)		261 (116.1 overs); Anand George 45 (110); Sarandeep Singh 3/41 (21)
422/9d (130.5 overs); Dinesh Mongia 160 (278); Thirunavukkarasu Kumaran 4/42 (17.5 overs)		189/6 (76 overs); Sridharan Sharath 71 (183); Sandeep Sharma 2/25 (13 overs)

Match drawn
Gandhi Sports Complex Ground, Amritsar
Umpires: SB Nandy and RT Ramachandran

- Punjab won the toss and elected to bat.

=== Quarterfinal 2 ===
30 March-3 April 1999
Scorecard

Hyderabad	v	Delhi
440 (145.3 overs); VVS Laxman 110 (257); Amit Bhandari 4/79 (26 overs)		160 (62.4 overs); Pankaj Joshi 44 (127); Kanwaljit Singh 8/86 (25.4)
404/9d (112.3 overs); VVS Laxman 193 (243); Rahul Sanghvi 3/79 (30.3 overs)		246 (62.3 overs); Davendra Sharma 68 (86); Kanwaljit Singh 5/68 (22 overs)

Hyderabad won by 438 runs
Gymkhana Ground, Secunderabad, Secunderabad
Umpires: Sekher Choudhary and CK Sathe

- Hyderabad won the toss and elected to bat.

=== Semifinal 1 ===
9–13 April 1999
Scorecard

Punjab	v	Karnataka
90 (31 overs); Navjot Singh Sidhu 26 (86); Dodda Ganesh 6/37 (14 overs)		322 (91.5 overs); Thilak Naidu 125 (164); Sandeep Sharma 4/75 (24.5 overs)
322 (95.1 overs); Amit Sharma 80 (190); Anand Yalvigi 4/60 (18 overs)		94/3 (18.2 overs); Sujith Somasunder 33 (37); Harbhajan Singh 2/30 (4 overs)

Karnataka won by 7 wickets
Gandhi Sports Complex Ground, Amritsar
Umpires: AM Saheba and VM Gupte

- Punjab won the toss and elected to bat.

=== Semifinal 2 ===
9–13 April 1999
Scorecard

Hyderabad	v	Madhya Pradesh
280 (112.1 overs); VVS Laxman 84 (150); Manish Majithia 4/56 (35 overs)		337 (136.3 overs); Devendra Bundela 112 (315); Kanwaljit Singh 5/117 (46 overs)
292 (112.4 overs); Vanka Pratap 108 (308); Manish Majithia 4/96 (43 overs)		203/3 (84 overs); Jai Prakash Yadav 83 (123); Daniel Manohar 1/16 (5 overs)

Match drawn
Gymkhana Ground, Secunderabad, Secunderabad
Umpires: SK Bansal and Desh Raj

- Hyderabad won the toss and elected to bat.
- Madhya Pradesh progressed to the final through their first innings lead.

=== Final ===
19–23 April 1999
Scorecard

Karnataka	v	Madhya Pradesh
304 (95.2 overs); Vijay Bharadwaj 86 (145); Harvinder Sodhi 5/78 (27.2 overs)		379 (100 overs); Santosh Sahu 130 (165); Dodda Ganesh 5/103 (30 overs)
321/7d (105 overs); J. Arunkumar 147 (250); Jai Prakash Yadav 3/45 (22 overs)		150 (84.5 overs); Abbas Ali 47 (204); Vijay Bharadwaj 6/24 (14.5 overs)

Karnataka won by 96 runs
M. Chinnaswamy Stadium, Bangalore
Umpires: Francis Gomes and S. K. Sharma
Player of the match: Vijay Bharadwaj (Karnataka)

- Karnataka won the toss and decided to bat
- J. Arunkumar (Karnataka) and Devendra Bundela (Madhya Pradesh) passed 3,000 and 1,000 runs respectively in first-class matches.
- Rajesh Chauhan (Madhya Pradesh) reached 300 wickets in first-class matches.

== Scorecards and averages ==
- CricketArchive
