= 1999–2000 Ranji Trophy =

Regional cricket season

- The Ranji Trophy, which the winners get.
- Dates: 23 October 1999 – 23 April 2000
- Administrator: BCCI
- Cricket format: First-class cricket
- Tournament format(s): League and knockout
- Champions: Mumbai (34th title)
- Participants: 27
- Most runs: V. V. S. Laxman (Hyderabad) (1415)
- Most wickets: Kanwaljit Singh (Hyderabad) (62)

The 1999–2000 Ranji Trophy was the 66th season of the Ranji Trophy, the premier first-class cricket tournament of India. it took place between October 1999 and April 2000. Mumbai defeated Hyderabad by 297 runs in the final. Hyderabad's V. V. S. Laxman set a new record scoring 1,415 runs and eight hundreds in the season. Kanwaljit Singh's 62 wickets is the second best for a season, after Bishan Bedi's 64 wickets in 1974-75. During the tournament, Rajeev Nayyar made the longest innings in first-class cricket, batting for 1,015 minutes for Himachal Pradesh against Jammu & Kashmir.

== Points table ==
=== Central Zone ===
Team	Pld	WO	LO	FL	FD	NR	Pts
Rajasthan	4	1	0	3	0	0	23
Railways	4	1	0	1	2	0	19
Uttar Pradesh	4	1	0	1	2	0	19
Madhya Pradesh	4	0	0	1	3	0	14
Vidarbha	4	0	3	1	0	0	5

=== East Zone ===
Team	Pld	WO	LO	FL	FD	NR	Pts
Orissa	4	1	0	3	0	0	23
Bihar	4	2	0	0	2	0	22
Bengal	4	1	0	2	1	0	21
Assam	4	1	1	0	2	0	14
Tripura	4	0	4	0	0	0	0

=== North Zone ===
Team	Pld	WO	LO	FL	FD	NR	Pts
Punjab	5	3	0	2	0	0	34
Delhi	5	3	0	1	1	0	32
Haryana	5	2	0	1	2	0	27
Jammu and Kashmir	5	1	2	0	2	0	14
Himachal Pradesh	5	0	3	1	1	0	8
Services	5	0	4	1	0	0	5

=== South Zone ===
Team	Pld	WO	LO	FL	FD	NR	Pts
Tamil Nadu	5	2	0	3	0	0	31
Hyderabad	5	2	0	2	1	0	29
Karnataka	5	3	1	0	1	0	27
Kerala	5	2	2	0	1	0	19
Andhra	5	1	2	0	2	0	14
Goa	5	0	5	0	0	0	0

=== West Zone ===
Team	Pld	WO	LO	FL	FD	NR	Pts
Mumbai	4	2	0	1	1	0	24
Baroda	4	0	0	4	0	0	20
Saurashtra	4	0	0	1	3	0	14
Maharashtra	4	0	1	2	1	0	13
Gujarat	4	0	1	0	3	0	9

=== Super League ===
==== Group A ====
Team	Pld	WO	LO	FL	FD	NR	Pts
Mumbai	4	4	0	0	0	0	32
Karnataka	4	2	1	0	1	0	19
Bengal	4	0	1	2	1	0	13
Delhi	4	0	2	1	1	0	8
Rajasthan	4	0	2	1	1	0	8

==== Group B ====
Team	Pld	WO	LO	FL	FD	NR	Pts
Punjab	4	2	0	1	1	0	24
Hyderabad	4	1	0	2	1	0	21
Baroda	4	1	1	2	0	0	18
Railways	4	1	1	0	2	0	14
Bihar	4	0	3	0	1	0	3

==== Group C ====
Team	Pld	WO	LO	FL	FD	NR	Pts
Tamil Nadu	4	2	0	2	0	0	26
Uttar Pradesh	4	2	0	0	1	1	22
Orissa	4	1	1	0	2	0	14
Saurashtra	4	1	3	0	0	0	8
Haryana	4	0	2	1	0	1	8

== Knockout stage ==
=== Quarter-finals ===
==== 1st Quarter-final ====
30 March–3 April 2000
Scorecard

Hyderabad	v	Uttar Pradesh
291 (102.5 overs); VVS Laxman 128 (263); Rajneesh Mishra 4/30 (16 overs)		362 (135.2 overs); Mohammad Kaif 66 (181); Kanwaljit Singh 6/97 (48.2 overs)
381/5d (98 overs); VVS Laxman 177* (241); Gyanendra Pandey 2/62 (15 overs)		218 (105 overs); Mohammad Kaif 86 (229); Venkatapathy Raju 6/57 (37 overs)

Hyderabad won by 92 runs
Green Park, Kanpur
Umpires: Aloke Bhattacharjee and Umesh Kumar

- Hyderabad won the toss and elected to bat.
- Ashish Zaidi (Uttar Pradesh) claimed his 200th wicket in first-class matches.

Hyderabad and Uttar Pradesh last met during the 1998 season with the former emerging as victors. Going into the quarter-final, Hyderabad had a win in their last match in the Super League, against Baroda, while Uttar Pradesh had lost to Tamil Nadu. Also, emerging India player Mohammad Kaif was making a return to his home side after having been on the sideline during the triangular series in Sharjah, while it was expected that Hyderabad had former India captain Mohammad Azharuddin returning after India's exit in the series. Azharuddin had scored more than 600 runs at 86 for his team before heading for international duty. However, in his absence, upon winning the toss and choosing to bat first, Hyderabad had VVS Laxman making a century. It was his fourth century of the season, and came in 187 deliveries. He was dropped thrice, and made the most of it, making 128 runs.

Uttar Pradesh's reply to their 291 came strong. Kaif and Jyoti Yadav both scored half-centuries, taking their team to 206/3 at the end of day 2. Off-spinner Kanwaljit Singh's impressive bowling, and hosts' captain Gyanendra Pandey 's addition of 47, meant the latter's team secure a 71-run lead. However, the visitors batted their way into the game with the help of another Laxman century, an unbeaten 177, setting the home side a target of 311. Laxman and opener Nand Kishore put on 180 runs for the second wicket, before the latter was trapped lbw for 93 by Pandey. Requiring 283 to win with ten wickets in hand, the hosts' batting saw a collapse on the final day. Spinners Venkatapathy Raju (6/57) and Singh (3/78) took their team home by a 92-run margin. The only notable partnership came for the second wicket, between brother Kaif and Mohammad Saif.

30 March–3 April 2000
Scorecard

Punjab	v	Tamil Nadu
258 (79.3 overs); Vikram Rathour 57 (91); Sadagoppan Mahesh 3/55 (17.3 overs)		461 (128.1 overs); Sridharan Sriram 165 (278); Harbhajan Singh 5/106 (37.4 overs)
366 (117 overs); Vikram Rathour 127 (262); Rajat Bhatia 3/18 (8 overs)		167/3 (55.2 overs); Sadagoppan Ramesh 77* (144); Rajinder Singh 1/21 (9 overs)

Tamil Nadu won by 7 wickets
M. A. Chidambaram Stadium, Chennai
Umpires: M. S. S. Ranawat and Shashank Ranade

- Tamil Nadu won the toss and elected to field.

=== Semi-finals ===
==== 1st Semi-final ====
11–15 April 2000
Scorecard

Hyderabad	v	Karnataka
711/8d (193 overs); VVS Laxman 353 (560); Venkatesh Prasad 5/121 (46 overs)		557 (162.4 overs); Dodda Ganesh 76 (123); Venkatapathy Raju 4/144 (58.4 overs)
236/6d (72.2 overs); Vanka Pratap 100* (202); Vijay Bharadwaj 2/24 (11 overs)

Match drawn
M. Chinnaswamy Stadium, Bengaluru
Umpires: Sekhar Chaudhuri and B. Jamula

- Karnataka won the toss and elected to field.

==== 2nd Semi-final ====
11–15 April 2000
Scorecard

Tamil Nadu	v	Mumbai
485 (121.4 overs); Robin Singh 183* (237); Ajit Agarkar 4/83 (29 overs)		490 (152 overs); Sachin Tendulkar 233* (334); Aashish Kapoor 3/93 (29 overs)
171 (54.1 overs); Hemang Badani 63 (124); Abey Kuruvilla 2/16 (7 overs)		169/2 (44.4 overs); Sameer Dighe 73 (107); Sadagoppan Ramesh 1/28 (5.4 overs)

Mumbai won by 8 wickets
Wankhede Stadium, Mumbai
Umpires: Krishna Hariharan and K. S. Giridharan

- Mumbai won the toss and elected to field.

=== Final ===
19–23 April 2000
Scorecard

Mumbai	v	Hyderabad
376 (113.2 overs); Vinod Kambli 108 (158); Venkatapathy Raju 4/110 (37.2 overs)		195 (64.4 overs); Mohammad Azharuddin 76 (139); Ajit Agarkar 3/26 (14.4 overs)
409 (89.3 overs); Sachin Tendulkar 128 (124); Venkatapathy Raju 5/123 (28.3 overs)		293 (98.2 overs); V. V. S. Laxman 111 (192); Rajesh Pawar 7/103 (34.2 overs)

Mumbai won by 297 runs
Wankhede Stadium, Mumbai
Umpires: Jasbir Singh, Narendra Menon

- Hyderabad won the toss and decided to field.

== Scorecards and averages ==
- Ranji Trophy 1999-00 at BCCI
- Statistical highlights of Ranji Trophy 1999-2000 at ESPNcricinfo
