= Amit Pathak =

Indian cricketer (born 1972)

Personal information
- Full name: Amit Surinder Pathak
- Born: 30 November 1972 (age 53); Visakhapatnam, Andhra Pradesh, India
- Batting: Right-handed
- Bowling: Right-arm medium
- Role: Opening batsman

Domestic team information
- Years: Team
- 1990/91–2004/05: Andhra

Career statistics
Competition	FC	List A
Matches	76	56
Runs scored	4,711	1,423
Batting average	36.23	25.41
100s/50s	11/23	1/10
Top score	264	114
Balls bowled	654	294
Wickets	4	2
Bowling average	79.00	138.00
5 wickets in innings	0	0
10 wickets in match	0	n/a
Best bowling	1/11	1/23
Catches/stumpings	51/–	15/–
- Source: ESPNcricinfo, 27 February 2016

Amit Surinder Pathak (born 30 November 1972) is an Indian former first-class cricketer who represented Andhra cricket team. He became a cricket coach after his playing career.

== Life and career ==
Pathak played as a right-handed batsman who normally opened the innings, making his first-class debut in the 1990/91 season. He represented India national under-19 cricket team in the following season, becoming the first Andhra player to appear for the national under-19 side. Pathak went on to play 76 first-class and 56 List A matches, also making appearances for South Zone during his 15-season career. His career-best score of 264 against Goa in the 2000–01 Ranji Trophy was the highest score by an Andhra batsman in first-class cricket until the record was broken by Srikar Bharat in 2015. Having captained the Andhra team in a few matches during his career, Pathak played his last first-class match in December 2004.

After his playing career, Pathak turned to cricket coaching. He worked as the assistant coach of Andhra and remains in that role as of the 2015/16 season.
