= 2000–01 Ranji Trophy =

- The Ranji Trophy, which the winners get.
- Administrator: BCCI
- Cricket format: First-class cricket
- Tournament format(s): League and knockout
- Champions: Baroda (5th title)
- Participants: 27
- Most runs: Yere Goud (Railways) (901)
- Most wickets: Dodda Ganesh (Karnataka) (37)

The 2000–01 Ranji Trophy was the 67th season of the Ranji Trophy. Baroda won their first title in 44 years beating Railways by 21 runs in the final. Baroda conceded a first innings lead of 151 runs, but Railways were bowled out in the second innings by Zaheer Khan who took five wickets for 43 runs.

== Zonal stage ==
Central Zone

Team	Pld	W	L	D	A	Pts
Rajasthan	4	1	0	3	0	23
Railways	4	1	0	3	0	21
Madhya Pradesh	4	1	0	3	0	19
Uttar Pradesh	4	1	2	1	0	14
Vidarbha	4	0	1	3	0	3

- Top three teams advanced to the knockout stage.

East Zone

Team	Pld	W	L	D	A	Pts
Orissa	4	3	0	1	0	29
Assam	4	2	1	1	0	19
Bengal	4	1	1	2	0	18
Bihar	4	0	1	3	0	11
Tripura	4	0	3	1	0	3

- Top three teams advanced to the knockout stage.

North Zone

Team	Pld	W	L	D	A	Pts
Punjab	5	5	0	0	0	40
Delhi	5	3	1	1	0	29
Jammu & Kashmir	5	3	2	0	0	24
Haryana	5	0	2	3	0	13
Himachal Pradesh	5	0	3	2	0	8
Services	5	0	3	2	0	6

- Top three teams advanced to the knockout stage.

West Zone

Team	Pld	W	L	D	A	Pts
Mumbai	4	1	0	3	0	21
Maharashtra	4	0	0	4	0	20
Baroda	4	1	0	3	0	19
Gujarat	4	1	1	2	0	14
Saurashtra	4	0	2	2	0	6

- Top three teams advanced to the knockout stage.

South Zone

Team	Pld	W	L	D	A	Pts
Tamil Nadu	5	1	0	3	1	26
Hyderabad	5	2	0	3	0	25
Karnataka	5	2	1	2	0	24
Kerala	5	1	1	3	0	21
Andhra	5	1	1	2	1	19
Goa	5	0	4	1	0	3

- Top three teams advanced to the knockout stage.

== Knockout stage ==
The draw for the quarter-finals were made after the final zonal-stage match, with the following fixtures announced. The fixtures in the knockout stage of the tournament are played across five days, instead of four days in the zonal stage.

Round of 16
WZ3	Baroda	467 & 355
EZ3	Bengal	247 & 353
SZ1	Tamil Nadu	592 & 518/8d
NZ2	Delhi	365 & 149/1
CZ3	Madhya Pradesh	490 & 291
SZ2	Hyderabad	382 & 50/2
EZ1	Orissa	501 & 299/4d
NZ3	Jammu & Kashmir	151 & 229
CZ1	Rajasthan	111 & 306
NZ1	Punjab	429
WZ1	Mumbai (Note: Mumbai got bye in Round of 16 on the virtue of winning 1999–2000 Ranji Trophy.)
bye
CZ2	Railways	431 & 657/5
WZ2	Maharashtra	308
EZ2	Assam	321 & 134
SZ3	Karnataka	312 & 144/3

Quarterfinals
WZ3	Baroda	324 & 184
SZ1	Tamil Nadu	186 & 162
CZ3	Madhya Pradesh	437 & 233/9d
EZ1	Orissa	479 & 192/3
NZ1	Punjab	383 & 322
WZ1	Mumbai	285 & 213
CZ2	Railways	451 & 418/9d
SZ3	Karnataka	237 & 279/4

Semifinals
WZ3	Baroda	568 & 409
EZ1	Orissa	280 & 361/5
NZ1	Punjab	249 & 356
CZ2	Railways	407 & 199/5

Final
WZ3	Baroda	243 & 373
CZ2	Railways	394 & 201

=== Final ===
19–23 April 2001
Scorecard

Railways	v	Baroda
243 (64.1 overs); Connor Williams 65; Harvinder Singh 4/59		394 (135 overs); Murali Kartik 79; Valmik Buch 3/86
373 (124 overs); Satyajit Parab 141; T. P. Singh 4/82		201 (64.2 overs); Sudhir Wankhede 58; Zaheer Khan 5/43

Baroda won by 21 runs
Gujarat State Fertilizer Corporation Ground, Vadodara
Umpires: Jasbir Singh, Shavir Tarapore
Player of the match: Zaheer Khan (Baroda)

- Baroda won the toss and decided to field

== Scorecards and averages ==
- CricketArchive
