= Kanwaljit Singh (cricketer) =

Personal information
- Born: 15 April 1958 (age 68); Secunderabad, Andhra Pradesh, India
- Batting: Right-handed
- Bowling: Right-arm off break
- Role: Bowler

Domestic team information
- Years: Team
- 1980/81–2000/01: Hyderabad
- 1986/87: Tamil Nadu

Career statistics
Competition	FC	List A
Matches	111	20
Runs scored	668	32
Batting average	10.12	6.40
100s/50s	0/1	0/0
Top score	50	14
Balls bowled	25,110	1,026
Wickets	369	24
Bowling average	28.24	27.95
5 wickets in innings	21	0
10 wickets in match	4	n/a
Best bowling	8/86	4/29
Catches/stumpings	49/–	2/–
- Source: ESPNcricinfo, 31 December 2015

Kanwaljit Singh (born 15 April 1958) is a former Indian first-class cricketer who played for Hyderabad and Tamil Nadu. He is one of the two players to have appeared in 100 matches for Hyderabad. After retirement he took up cricket coaching.

== Career ==
Although Kanwaljit made his first-class debut for Hyderabad in December 1980 during the 1980–81 Ranji Trophy, he could not cement his place for many years due to the presence of senior spinners Shivlal Yadav and Arshad Ayub in the team. It was not until the 1994–95 season that he came to the limelight when he appeared for South Zone, India A and Board President's XI, and took 47 first-class wickets at an average of 21.31. In the 1998–99 season, he had to his name 51 wickets at an average of 23.58. He was one of the five cricketers to be named as Indian Cricketer of the Year in 1998. In the 1999–00 Ranji Trophy season, Kanwaljit, at the age of 42, took 62 wickets, the joint-second most wickets in a Ranji season, after Bishan Bedi's 64 wickets in 1974–75. He made his final first-class appearance in 2001 in which he took nine wickets. He announced his retirement after he was dropped from the team.

After retirement, Kanwaljit became a cricket coach. He worked as the bowling coach of Hyderabad and was signed up as the assistant coach of the Deccan Chargers in 2008. He worked as the Hyderabad Under-19 coach, before resigning from the position in 2010. He was the director of Hyderabad Cricket Academy but was suspended by the Hyderabad Cricket Association in 2014 for allegedly assaulting the brother of the then BCCI vice-president Shivlal Yadav.

In August 2018, he was appointed as the coach of Nagaland cricket team.
