= Parth Satwalkar =

Indian cricketer (born 1974)

Personal information
- Born: 28 June 1974 (age 52); Hyderabad, India

Domestic team information
- Years: Team
- 1999-2001: Hyderabad

Career statistics
Competition	FC	LA
Matches	12	8
Runs scored	551	145
Batting average	27.55	24.16
100s/50s	0/5	0/0
Top score	80	39
Balls bowled	1,247	252
Wickets	19	7
Bowling average	35.68	28.42
5 wickets in innings	0	0
10 wickets in match	0	0
Best bowling	4/41	2/18
Catches/stumpings	1/0	0/0
- Source: ESPNcricinfo, 22 August 2018

Parth Satwalkar (born 28 June 1974) is an Indian former cricketer. He played twelve first-class matches for Hyderabad between 1999 and 2001.

== See also ==
- List of Hyderabad cricketers
