= Fahad Shahnawaz =

Indian cricketer

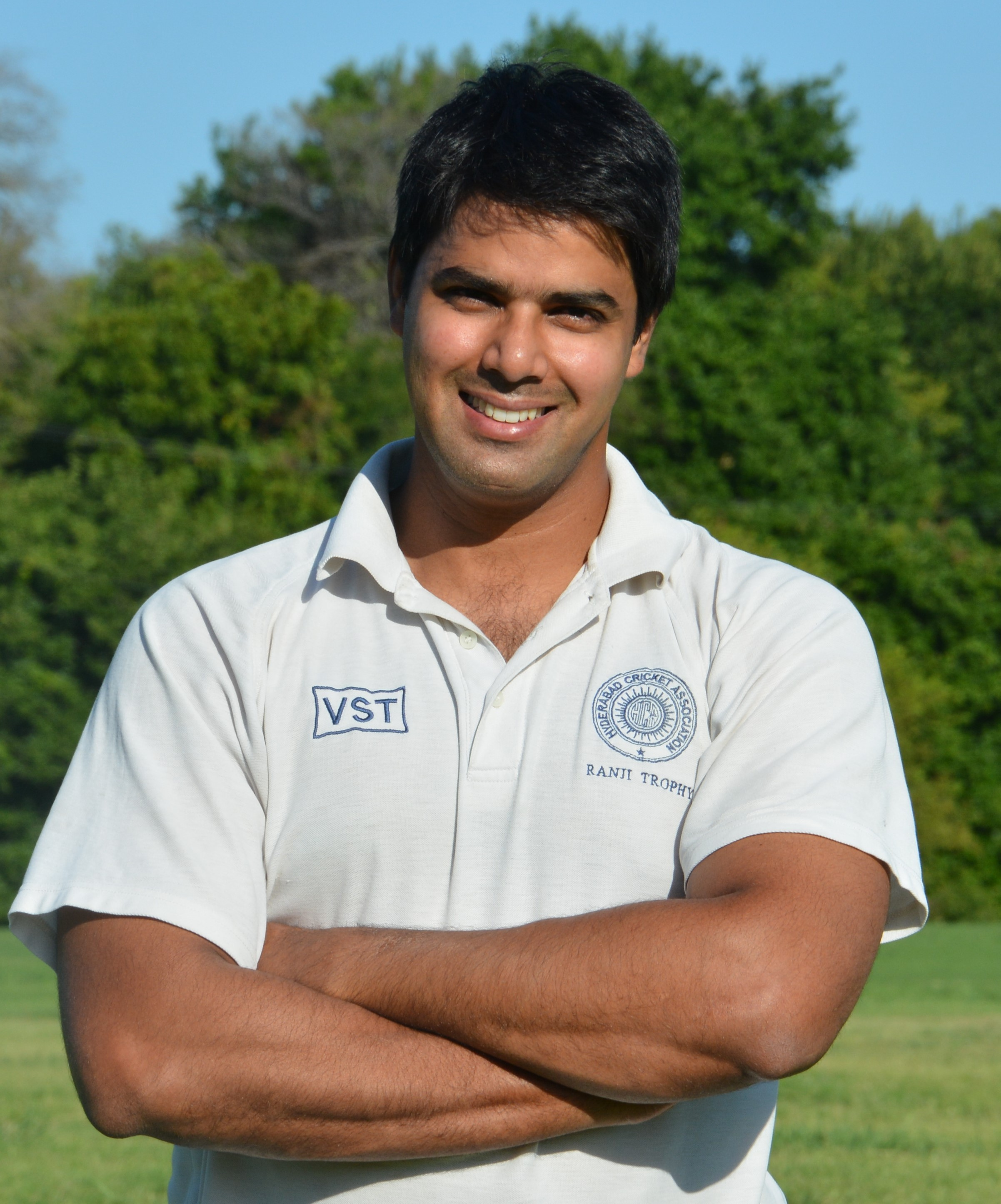

Personal information
- Born: 5 January 1982 (age 44); Hyderabad, India
- Batting: Right-handed
- Bowling: Right-arm medium

Domestic team information
- Years: Team
- 2001-2002: National Under-22
- 2001-2005: Moin-ud-Dowlah
- 2004-2005: Buchi Babu
- 2004: Hyderabad
- 2006-2008: Dayton Cricket Club, Ohio
- 2011-2012: EACA, New York
- 2012-2014: Cricket League of New Jersey
- 2014-2016: North Texas Cricket Association
- September 2016: Central USA Premium cricket League

Career statistics
| Competition | First-class |
|---|---|
| Matches | 3 |
| Runs scored | 14 |
| Batting average | 7.00 |
| 100s/50s | 0/0 |
| Top score | 9* |
| Balls bowled | 297 |
| Wickets | 6 |
| Bowling average | 26.00 |
| 5 wickets in innings | 0 |
| 10 wickets in match | 0 |
| Best bowling | 2/15 |
| Catches/stumpings | 0/– |

Fahad Shahnawaz (born 5 January 1982) is an Indian former cricketer. He played three first-class matches for Hyderabad in 2004. He has also played the Vizzy Trophy which is the highest Inter-Universities platform for up-coming cricketers. Along with other distinguished tournaments like national under-22, Bucchi Babu, Moin-Ud-Dowla gold cup. After coming to United States of America he played in many cricket leagues around US like Greater Dayton Cricket club, Eastern American Cricket League New York, Cricket League of New Jersey, and the North Texas Cricket Association. He was invited in 2013 for training in preparation for National Tournament in the New York Region. In September 2016 he played the Central USA premier cricket League for Dallas team Known as DCL Jaguars.
