= Ramakrishnan Sridhar =

Cricketer

Personal information
- Full name: Ramakrishnan Sridhar
- Born: 16 July 1970 (age 56); Mysore, Mysore State, India
- Batting: Left-handed
- Bowling: Slow left-arm orthodox
- Role: Bowler

Domestic team information
- Years: Team
- 1989–2001: Hyderabad

Career statistics
Competition	First-class	List A
Matches	35	15
Runs scored	574	69
Batting average	16.40	17.25
100s/50s	0/1	0/0
Top score	58	30*
Balls bowled	6529	787
Wickets	91	14
Bowling average	29.09	28.92
5 wickets in innings	2	0
10 wickets in match	0	0
Best bowling	6/91	3/15
Catches/stumpings	25/–	2/–
- Source: ESPNcricinfo, 31 December 2014

Ramakrishnan Sridhar (born 16 July 1970), commonly known as R Sridhar, is a former Indian first-class cricketer and the former fielding coach of the Indian national cricket team. He played for Hyderabad cricket team from 1989/90 to 2000/01, before taking up cricket coaching in 2001.

== Playing career ==
Born in Mysore, Sridhar played as a frontline spinner for Hyderabad. From 1989/90 to 2000/01, he played 35 first-class matches and 15 List A matches for Hyderabad. Played overseas for Townville C.C in the mid Yorkshire league (England) in two separate spells. Twice mid Yorkshire league winner.

== Coaching career ==
After the end of his playing career, Sridhar began his coaching career in 2001. He completed a three-level course for accreditation as a certified coach in 2007. From 2007 to 2011, he coached Hyderabad Under-19 team for three years and Hyderabad Under-16 team for one year. In 2011, he became a part of the National Cricket Academy in Bangalore. He was then appointed the fielding coach of the India Under-19 cricket team in 2011.

In February 2014, Sridhar served as the assistant coach of the India Under-19 team at the 2014 ICC Under-19 Cricket World Cup in UAE. In April 2014, the IPL team Kings XI Punjab appointed Sridhar as the fielding coach of the team. In July 2014, he was selected as the head coach of the Andhra cricket team for two years. In August, he was named the fielding coach of the India national cricket team for the ODI series against England. After the conclusion of the ODI series, BCCI decided to give him a longer run as the fielding coach of the team. He was also the head coach of TRIPURA CRICKET ASSOCIATION. He was handed a contract extension with the India national cricket team and has ever since continued to be their fielding coach, guiding them to multiple successful tours since 2014. In 2021, after Rahul Dravid took over as head coach of the team, he was replaced by T. Dilip.

In 2023, he coached the California Knights to a 3rd place finish in the US Masters T10 tournament

In August 2024, he was appointed as the assistant coach of the Afghanistan national cricket team for upcoming series against New Zealand and South Africa.
