= H. S. Sekhon =

Indian cricket umpire (born 1950)

Personal information
- Born: 11 November 1950 (age 76)

Umpiring information
- ODIs umpired: 2 (1994–1996)
- Source: ESPNcricinfo, 29 May 2014

H. S. Sekhon (born 11 November 1950) is a former Indian cricket umpire. Besides umpiring in domestic cricket matches in India, he stood in two ODI games between 1994 and 1996.

== See also ==
- List of One Day International cricket umpires
