= Vijay Kumar (cricketer) =

Indian cricketer (born 1975)

Personal information
- Born: 16 March 1975 (age 51); Akividu, India
- Batting: Right-handed
- Role: Wicketkeeper

Domestic team information
- Years: Team
- 2000/01: Hyderabad
- 2008: Deccan Chargers

Career statistics
Competition	FC
Matches	1
Runs scored	29
Batting average	29.00
100s/50s	0/0
Top score	29
Catches/stumpings	0/0
- Source: ESPNcricinfo, 22 August 2018

Vijay Kumar (born 16 March 1975) is an Indian former cricketer. He played one first-class match for Hyderabad in 2000/01.

== See also ==
- List of Hyderabad cricketers
