= Arlem Breweries Ground =

Cricket ground in Margao, Goa, India

Coordinates: 15°17′45.16″N 73°58′29.85″E

- Interactive map of Arlem Breweries Ground

Ground information
- Location: Margao, India
- Country: India
- Establishment: 1976
- Last used: 2005
- End names
- Brewary End; R.T.O End

Team information
Goa	(1986–2005)
- As of 29 October 2011; Source: Ground profile

Arlem Breweries Ground is a cricket ground in Margao, Goa, India. Established in 1976, the ground held its first first-class to be played there came in the 1985/86 Ranji Trophy when Goa played Hyderabad. Between the 1985/86 season and the 2003/04 season, the ground held twelve first-class matches. The first List A match played there came when Goa played Andhra Pradesh in the 1994/95 Ranji Trophy one-day competition. Seven further List A matches have been played on the ground, the last of which saw Goa play Karnataka in the 2004/05 Ranji Trophy one-day competition.
