= Balwant Sharma =

Indian cricket umpire (born 1953)

Personal information
- Full name: Balwant Sharma
- Born: 12 February 1953 (age 73)

Umpiring information
- Source: ESPNcricinfo, 21 October 2016

Balwant Sharma (born 12 February 1953) is an Indian cricket umpire. He has stood in matches in the Ranji Trophy tournament.
