= Narender Pal Singh =

Personal information
- Born: 10 September 1973 (age 53); Laksar, Uttarakhand, India
- Batting: Right-handed
- Bowling: Right-arm medium-fast
- Role: Bowler

Domestic team information
- Years: Team
- 1993/94–2006/07: Hyderabad

Career statistics
Competition	FC	List A
Matches	101	48
Runs scored	1,535	188
Batting average	14.48	14.46
100s/50s	0/3	0/0
Top score	74	29*
Balls bowled	18,237	2,393
Wickets	319	70
Bowling average	26.95	24.68
5 wickets in innings	16	0
10 wickets in match	2	n/a
Best bowling	7/24	4/31
Catches/stumpings	39/–	17/–
- Source: ESPNcricinfo, 28 March 2016

Narender Pal Singh (born 10 September 1973), also known as N. P. Singh, is an Indian former first-class cricketer who represented Hyderabad for 14 seasons. He later worked as a selector for Hyderabad Cricket Association.

== Life and career ==
Born in Laksar, Singh played as a right-arm medium-fast bowler for Hyderabad. He made his first-class debut for the team at the age of 20 in the 1993–94 Ranji Trophy. He appeared in 101 first-class matches and took 319 wickets at an average less than 27. He also claimed 70 wickets in 48 List A matches at 24.68. He was the four highest wicket-takers of the 1998–99 Ranji Trophy and part of the Hyderabad team that finished runners-up in the 1999–00 Ranji Trophy. He played his last first-class match in December 2006, finishing as one of the players with most appearances for Hyderabad (97 first-class appearances).

Singh became a selector for the Hyderabad Cricket Association (HCA) soon after his retirement. He also worked as the chairman of the senior team selection panel of HCA. He was replaced in the selection panel in 2011, after which he worked as a consultant for HCA's district and satellite academies. He was once again named chairman of HCA's Ranji and under-25 selection panel ahead of the 2013–14 season.
