= Mohammad Nadeemuddin =

Indian cricketer (born 1982)

Personal information
- Born: 13 November 1982 (age 43); Hyderabad, India

Domestic team information
- Years: Team
- 2002-2005: Hyderabad

Career statistics
Competition	LA
Matches	6
Runs scored	10
Batting average	5.00
100s/50s	0/0
Top score	5
Balls bowled	246
Wickets	8
Bowling average	22.25
5 wickets in innings	0
10 wickets in match	0
Best bowling	3/26
Catches/stumpings	1/0
- Source: ESPNcricinfo, 22 August 2018

Mohammad Nadeemuddin (born 13 November 1982) is an Indian former cricketer. He played six List A matches for Hyderabad between 2002 and 2005.

== See also ==
- List of Hyderabad cricketers
