= Yere Goud =

Indian cricketer (born 1971)

Yere Gowda
Personal information
- Full name: Yere Karekal Thippana Goud
- Born: 27 November 1971 (age 54); Raichur, Mysuru State, (present-day Karnataka) India
- Batting: Right-handed
- Bowling: Right-arm leg-break
- Role: Batsman

Domestic team information
- Years: Team
- 1994–2007: Karnataka
- 1995–2011: Railways

Career statistics
Competition	FC	LA	T20
Matches	134	49	7
Runs scored	7,650	1051	17
Batting average	45.53	37.53	8.5
100s/50s	16/39	0/5	0/0
Top score	221*	85*	15
Balls bowled	985	66	–
Wickets	10	0	–
Bowling average	58.70	–	–
5 wickets in innings	0	–	–
10 wickets in match	0	–	–
Best bowling	2/29	–	–
Catches/stumpings	61/–	16/–	2/–
- Source: ESPN Cricinfo, 16 December 2013

Yere Karekal Thippana Gowda (born 27 November 1971) is an Indian cricketer who played for Karnataka and Railways. He is primarily a right-handed batsman.

He debuted for Karnataka in 1994. A year later he moved to Railways and won 2 Ranji, 3 Irani with them. He also won the Duleep Trophy playing for Central Zone. In 2006–07 he returned to Karnataka to captain them. He was barred by BCCI for the 1st match for failing to inform about coming to his home team. He again returned to Railways to play until 2011 for them. He was one of the few Indian cricketers to play 100 Ranji matches. Javagal Srinath called him the Rahul Dravid of Railways. However, despite his success at domestic level, he was never selected for the Indian national team.
