= Anand Yalvigi =

Indian cricketer (born 1975)

Personal information
- Full name: Anand Ramrao Yalvigi
- Born: 9 February 1975 (age 51); Pune, Maharashtra, India
- Batting: Right-handed
- Bowling: Right-arm off break

Domestic team information
- Years: Team
- 1996/97: Mumbai
- 1998/99–2000/01: Karnataka
- 2001/02: Maharashtra
- FC debut: 14 November 1996 Mumbai v Saurashtra
- Last FC: 6 December 2001 Maharashtra v Gujarat
- LA debut: 14 November 1998 Karnataka v Hyderabad
- Last LA: 11 December 2000 Karnataka v Andhra

Career statistics
Competition	First-class	LA
Matches	29	14
Runs scored	626	126
Batting average	20.19	21
100s/50s	0/2	0/0
Top score	95	32
Balls bowled	4528	640
Wickets	61	16
Bowling average	38.7	24.5
5 wickets in innings	2	1
10 wickets in match	0	0
Best bowling	5/41	5/28
Catches/stumpings	15/–	4/–
- Source: cricketarchive, 3 December 2015

Anand Yalvigi (born 9 February 1975) is a former Indian cricketer. He played as a right-handed batsman and right-arm off break bowler. He made his debut in First-class cricket on 4 November 1996 in a Ranji Trophy match for Mumbai against Saurashtra. Overall he has played 29 First-class cricket matches and 14 List A matches.
