= Mangalapally Srinivas =

Indian cricketer (born 1974)

Personal information
- Born: 26 December 1974 (age 51); Hyderabad, India

Domestic team information
- Years: Team
- 1996-2001: Hyderabad

Career statistics
Competition	FC	LA
Matches	9	8
Runs scored	300	78
Batting average	27.27	13.00
100s/50s	1/0	0/0
Top score	107	21
Catches/stumpings	19/4	2/2
- Source: ESPNcricinfo, 22 August 2018

Mangalapally Srinivas (born 26 December 1974) is an Indian former cricketer. He played nine first-class matches for Hyderabad between 2000 and 2002.

== See also ==
- List of Hyderabad cricketers
