= Thilak Naidu =

Indian cricketer (born 1978)

Personal information
- Full name: Venkatswamy Suryaprakash Thilak Naidu
- Born: 27 January 1978 (age 48); Bangalore, Karnataka
- Batting: Right-handed
- Role: Wicket-keeper

Domestic team information
- Years: Team
- 1998–2009: Karnataka
- 2009–2011: Provident Bangalore
- Source: ESPNcricinfo, 5 May 2016

Venkatswamy Suryaprakash Thilak Naidu (born 27 January 1978) is an Indian first-class cricketer who played for Karnataka cricket team. He was a right-handed wicket-keeper batsman. He was born in Bangalore.

He played 93 first-class matches between 1998–99 and 2009–10 as wicket-keeper in which he took 220 catches and did 27 stumpings along with 4386 runs at an average of 34.80.
