= Vanka Pratap =

Indian cricketer (born 1973)

Personal information
- Born: 21 November 1973 (age 52); Hyderabad, Andhra Pradesh, India
- Batting: Right-handed
- Bowling: Right-arm medium
- Role: Batting all-rounder

Domestic team information
- Years: Team
- 1991/92–2001/02: Hyderabad

Career statistics
Competition	FC	List A
Matches	83	49
Runs scored	3,957	1,190
Batting average	36.30	37.18
100s/50s	6/27	3/4
Top score	136	107
Balls bowled	3,268	1,002
Wickets	44	22
Bowling average	37.88	36.40
5 wickets in innings	1	0
10 wickets in match	0	n/a
Best bowling	5/100	3/24
Catches/stumpings	49/–	13/–
- Source: ESPNcricinfo, 28 March 2016

Vanka Pratap (born 21 November 1973) is an Indian former first-class cricketer who represented Hyderabad and India A. He later worked as a selector for the Hyderabad Cricket Association.

== Life and career ==
An all-rounder, Pratap batted right-handed and bowled right-arm medium pace. He made his first-class debut for Hyderabad at the age of 18 in December 1991. He went on to make 83 first-class and 49 List A appearances for Hyderabad, South Zone, Board President's XI, Wills XI and India A. He scored just under 4000 first-class and over 1000 List A runs, and took 66 wickets in the two formats combined. His final first-class appearance came in December 2001 at the age of 28.

In 2003, Pratap made allegations that he was asked to bribe a selector to play for India by a person on behalf of the selector.

Pratap later worked as a member of the Ranji team selection committee of the Hyderabad Cricket Association (HCA). He also served as the chairman of the junior team selection committee of the HCA.
