= Faiz Ahmed (Hyderabad cricketer) =

Indian cricketer (born 1978)

Personal information
- Born: 21 June 1978 (age 48); Hyderabad, India

Domestic team information
- Years: Team
- 1999-2004: Hyderabad

Career statistics
Competition	FC	LA
Matches	13	10
Runs scored	339	101
Batting average	21.18	14.42
100s/50s	0/2	0/0
Top score	65*	24
Balls bowled	1,651	462
Wickets	24	11
Bowling average	36.95	31.09
5 wickets in innings	1	0
10 wickets in match	0	0
Best bowling	6/29	2/24
Catches/stumpings	3/0	1/0
- Source: ESPNcricinfo, 22 August 2018

Faiz Ahmed (born 21 June 1978) is an Indian former cricketer. He played thirteen first-class matches for Hyderabad between 1999 and 2004.

== See also ==
- List of Hyderabad cricketers
