= Francis Gomes =

Indian cricket umpire (born 1948)

Personal information
- Born: 29 November 1948 (age 77)

Umpiring information
- ODIs umpired: 2 (2000–2001)
- Source: ESPNcricinfo, 18 May 2014

Francis Gomes (born 29 November 1948) is an Indian former cricket umpire. He officiated in two international fixtures, both of them ODI games in 2000–01.

== See also ==
- List of One Day International cricket umpires
