= Gangashetty Arvind Kumar =

Indian cricketer (born 1973)

Personal information
- Born: 4 October 1973 (age 53); Hyderabad, India

Domestic team information
- Years: Team
- 1994-2002: Hyderabad

Career statistics
Competition	FC	LA
Matches	43	27
Runs scored	2,141	555
Batting average	31.02	31.02
100s/50s	3/12	0/3
Top score	141	66
Balls bowled	216	18
Wickets	0	0
Bowling average	-	-
5 wickets in innings	0	0
10 wickets in match	0	0
Best bowling	-	-
Catches/stumpings	21/0	13/0
- Source: ESPNcricinfo, 22 August 2018

Gangashetty Arvind Kumar (born 4 October 1973) is an Indian former cricketer. He played 43 first-class matches for Hyderabad between 1994 and 2004.

== See also ==
- List of Hyderabad cricketers
