= Shivaji Yadav =

Indian cricketer (born 1976)

Personal information
- Born: 6 September 1976 (age 50); Hyderabad, India

Domestic team information
- Years: Team
- 1995-2005: Hyderabad

Career statistics
Competition	FC	LA
Matches	33	32
Runs scored	708	250
Batting average	17.70	13.88
100s/50s	0/2	0/1
Top score	78*	59
Balls bowled	6,452	1,499
Wickets	90	34
Bowling average	33.62	31.38
5 wickets in innings	6	1
10 wickets in match	0	0
Best bowling	7/70	5/22
Catches/stumpings	30/0	10/0
- Source: ESPNcricinfo, 22 August 2018

Shivaji Yadav (born 6 September 1976) is an Indian former cricketer. He played 33 first-class matches for Hyderabad between 1995 and 2004. Yadav later became a junior selector for the Hyderabad Cricket Association, before leading the selection committee.

== See also ==
- List of Hyderabad cricketers
