= Sankinani Vishnuvardhan =

Indian cricketer (born 1976)

Personal information
- Born: 30 October 1976 (age 50); Warangal, India

Domestic team information
- Years: Team
- 1995-2005: Hyderabad

Career statistics
Competition	FC	LA
Matches	32	28
Runs scored	658	295
Batting average	15.30	17.35
100s/50s	0/3	0/1
Top score	65*	52
Balls bowled	5,541	1,389
Wickets	99	32
Bowling average	26.25	32.53
5 wickets in innings	3	0
10 wickets in match	0	0
Best bowling	6/55	4/49
Catches/stumpings	10/0	5/0
- Source: ESPNcricinfo, 22 August 2018

Sankinani Vishnuvardhan (born 30 October 1976) is an Indian former cricketer. He played 32 first-class matches for Hyderabad between 1995 and 2005.

== See also ==
- List of Hyderabad cricketers
