= Devisetty Vinay Kumar =

Indian cricketer (born 1977)

Personal information
- Born: 21 April 1977 (age 49); Delhi, India

Domestic team information
- Years: Team
- 1996–2007: Hyderabad

Career statistics
Competition	FC	LA
Matches	74	37
Runs scored	3,544	1,169
Batting average	34.07	43.29
100s/50s	5/22	2/9
Top score	126	104
Catches/stumpings	48/0	12/0
- Source: ESPNcricinfo, 22 August 2018

Devisetty Vinay Kumar (born 21 April 1977) is an Indian former cricketer. He played 74 first-class matches for Hyderabad between 1996 and 2007.

== See also ==
- List of Hyderabad cricketers
