= Mohammad Ghouse Baba =

Indian cricketer (born 1978)

Personal information
- Born: 6 September 1978 (age 48); Mahbubnagar, India

Domestic team information
- Years: Team
- 2000-2004: Hyderabad

Career statistics
Competition	FC	LA
Matches	9	13
Runs scored	186	58
Batting average	14.30	7.25
100s/50s	0/0	0/0
Top score	32	20
Balls bowled	1,515	624
Wickets	21	18
Bowling average	37.09	28.44
5 wickets in innings	1	1
10 wickets in match	0	0
Best bowling	5/97	5/48
Catches/stumpings	2/0	5/0
- Source: ESPNcricinfo, 22 August 2018

Mohammad Ghouse Baba (born 6 September 1978) is an Indian former cricketer. He played nine first-class matches for Hyderabad between 2000 and 2004.

== See also ==
- List of Hyderabad cricketers
