= Nand Kishore (cricketer, born 1970) =

Indian cricketer (born 1970)

A. Nand Kishore
Personal information
- Full name: Ammanabrole Nand Kishore
- Born: 10 July 1970 (age 56); Warangal, India
- Batting: Right-handed
- Bowling: Right-arm medium
- Role: Umpire

Domestic team information
- Years: Team
- 1994-2002: Hyderabad

Umpiring information
- WODIs umpired: 2 (2018)
- WT20Is umpired: 1 (2022)

Career statistics
Competition	FC	LA
Matches	76	35
Runs scored	4,352	896
Batting average	35.38	28.90
100s/50s	9/18	0/5
Top score	214	90*
Balls bowled	30	67
Wickets	0	0
Bowling average	-	-
5 wickets in innings	0	0
10 wickets in match	0	0
Best bowling	-	-
Catches/stumpings	95/0	7/0
- Source: ESPNcricinfo, 7 February 2023

A. Nand Kishore (born 10 July 1970) is an Indian former first-class cricketer. Kishore was a right-handed batsman and a right-arm medium-pace bowler. He is now an umpire and stood in matches in the 2015–16 Ranji Trophy.
