= Daniel Manohar =

Indian cricketer (born 1974)

Personal information
- Born: 13 March 1974 (age 52); Hyderabad, India

Domestic team information
- Years: Team
- 1997-2007: Hyderabad

Career statistics
Competition	FC	LA
Matches	73	36
Runs scored	4,009	1,287
Batting average	33.68	37.85
100s/50s	8/20	2/8
Top score	144	131
Balls bowled	4,083	390
Wickets	65	13
Bowling average	32.30	26.92
5 wickets in innings	0	0
10 wickets in match	0	0
Best bowling	4/48	3/26
Catches/stumpings	58/0	10/0
- Source: ESPNcricinfo, 22 August 2018

Daniel Manohar (born 13 March 1974) is an Indian former cricketer. He played 73 first-class matches for Hyderabad between 1997 and 2007.

== See also ==
- List of Hyderabad cricketers
