= Gymkhana Ground, Secunderabad =

Cricket ground in the Secunderabad, Telangana

Gymkhana Ground
Ground information
- Location: Secunderabad, Telangana
- Establishment: 1928
- Capacity: n/a
- End names
- n/a n/a

International information
- Only WODI: 14 December 1997: England v Denmark

Team information
Hyderabad cricket team	(1928–present)
- As of 25 August 2015

Gymkhana Ground is a cricket ground in the Secunderabad, Telangana. No major stadiums are located in Secunderabad apart from Gymkhana Ground and is the most important ground in the city.

== History ==
The ground was established in 1928 when Hyderabad Cricket Club and Raja Dhanrajgir's XI played on the ground in Behram-ud-Dowlah Tournament. In 1931, the ground hosted its first first-class match between Hyderabad and Maharaj Kumar of Vizianagram's XI. In 1997, the ground hosted a Women's World Cup match between England Women's and Denmark Women's played against each other.

== See also ==
- 1997 Women's Cricket World Cup
