= Hyderabad Cricket Association =

Governing body of cricket in Telangana state, India

Team information
- Founded: 1934
- Home ground: Rajiv Gandhi International Cricket Stadium
- Official website: hycricket.org

Hyderabad Cricket Association
- Sport: Cricket
- Membership: Board of Control for Cricket in India
- Abbreviation: HCA
- Founded: 1934
- Regional affiliation: Board of Control for Cricket in India
- President: Jagan Mohan Rao
- Chairman: Jagan Mohan Rao

Hyderabad Cricket Association is the governing body of cricket activities in Hyderabad and other districts in the state of Telangana in India and the Hyderabad cricket team. It is an affiliated member of the Board of Control for Cricket in India. The association was founded in 1934 and has been affiliated to the BCCI ever since.

The HCA operates the Rajiv Gandhi International Cricket Stadium in Hyderabad, which hosts International level Test, ODI and T20 cricket matches.

== History ==
The people of Hyderabad were introduced to cricket by the British Army. Around 1880 cricket started to take roots in the city. Mr.N. Ganesan, erstwhile Joint Secretary of Hyderabad Cricket Association (HCA) traced origins of serious cricket in the city by interacting with S.M. Hadi, S.R. Mehta, Nooh Abbasi, cricketers and organizers of yesteryears whose peers were the originators of the game in the city.

Before the Moin-ud-Dowlah Gold Cup Tournament began in 1930/31 there is no record of any first-class cricket at Hyderabad. Raja Lochan Chand was reported to be the first chief patron of the game in late 19th century and early 20th century and Masood Ahmed, Ahmed Ali, Nazeer Baig and Khurshid Baig were few cricketers to distinguish themselves.

Oxford University Authentics that toured India in 1902/03 season was the first foreign team to visit and play at Hyderabad. As the matches they played at Hyderabad were not deemed first class cricket, there is no official record for reference.

The game was gradual to gain popularity. In the 1920s and 1930s, quadrangular tournaments between the Hindus, Muslims, Europeans and Parsees were instrumental in popularizing the game amongst the masses throughout the country and Hyderabad was no exception. Despite appeal of Mahatma Gandhi to end communal polarization in sport the Quadrangular/ Pentangular tournaments continued to thrill masses until 1947 and popularized the game of cricket encouraging youngsters to take-up the sport seriously.

At Hyderabad Educational institutions like Nizam's College, Medical College, Madarsa-I-Aliya also pioneered the cause of cricket by encouraging it amongst the students. Nawab Moin-ud-Dowla, Maharaja Kishan Pershad, Nawab Salar Jung Bahadur patronized the game and initiated tournaments for schools, educational institutions and clubs. Private Clubs like HUCC and SUCC, formed by cricket enthusiasts became prominent and cricket leagues were established.

Thanks to the patronage and efforts of Nawab Moin-ud-Dowla Bahadur, first class cricket came to Hyderabad in 1930/31 with Moin-ud-dowla Gold Cup. Three teams participated in the tournament. They were Hyderabad, Maharaj Kumar of Vizianagaram XI and Nawab of Moin-ud-Dowla XI. The people of Hyderabad witnessed world class players for the first time in Jack Hobbs and Bert Sutcliffe (English Test Stars) alongside a number of famous players from Indian First Class Circuit in CK Nayudu, Wazir Ali, JG Nalve, Amar Singh and Naoomal Jaoomal who went on to represent India in its first ever test match at Lords against England in the summer of 1932.

In 1933/34 MCC under the captaincy of Douglas Jardine toured India to play 3 test matches. On 25 January 1934 MCC played at Hyderabad against Nawab of Moin-ud-Dowla XI on Gymkhana Grounds. MCC was the first official overseas touring team to play at Hyderabad and present world class cricket to its people. Hyderabad witnessed the performance of Hedley Verity, the slow left arm orthodox spin bowler of MCC, a veteran of 40 test matches, claiming 5/63 in the first innings and 3/78 in the second innings of the drawn match at Hyderabad against star studded Nawab of Moin-ud-Dowla XI, which included Mushtaq Ali, Lala Amarnath and CS Nayudu the debutants of 1933/34 test series against England.

Owing to the tournament, the general standard of the game improved tremendously producing many promising cricketers.

In 1934, Ranji Trophy National First Class Cricket Championships were being initiated in India. There was a need for local officiating body to imbibe organization into Hyderabad Cricket. In April 1934, Hyderabad Cricket Association was formed by Nadir Shah Chenoy, DN Dittia, Ganesh Rao, Hussain Ali Khan, S.Ali Raza, Mahmood Hussain Khan, P F Durrand, Dattatriya and Rangannah. They elected Nawab Turab Yar Jung as its first President and S.M.Hadi as Secretary.

Thus from 1934 until date Hyderabad Cricket Association has been the custodians of the game of cricket and keepers of sacred code in Hyderabad.

Under several cricketing personalities like, Mansoor Ali Khan Pataudi, Abbas Ali Baig, M.L. Jaisimha, Syed Abid Ali, Mohammad Azharuddin, Shivlal Yadav, Venkatapathy Raju, VVS Laxman, Pragyan Ojha, Ambati Rayudu, and Hanuma Vihari, the Hyderabad Cricket Association grew into a governing body and nurtured the sport of cricket within its domain by creating vistas for cricketers and their dreams of national & international glory.

In September 2019, Mohammad Azharuddin elected as the President of Hyderabad Cricket Association.

In July 2025, HCA President A. Jagan Mohan Rao and four officials were arrested by Telangana’s CID over an IPL 2025 ticketing scandal. They faced charges including forgery, misappropriation, criminal breach of trust, and cheating. Sunrisers Hyderabad accused them of coercion and blackmail for extra complimentary tickets, violating agreements. The case remains under investigation.

== Home stadium ==
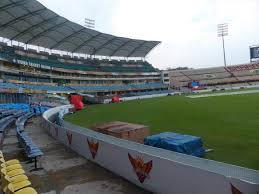
Rajiv Gandhi International Cricket Stadium in Uppal

HCA's previous home ground was the Lal Bahadur Shastri Stadium in the Fateh Maidan sports complex at Basheerbagh in central Hyderabad. The ground belonged to the Sports Authority of Telangana State, and HCA had limited operating autonomy there. Moreover, due to its small size, it was known as a high-scoring ground and so Hyderabad was not considered for many high-profile cricket matches in India.

In 2003, the proposal for a new stadium was submitted by HCA to the government of Andhra Pradesh. The government identified a large piece of land suitable for the project at Uppal. By 2005, when most of the stadium was built, it was ready to host its first ODI Match between India and South Africa. The stadium was named in the memory of former Prime Minister Rajiv Gandhi.

In November 2019, Indian cricketer Ambati Rayudu accused HCA of "rampant corruption and politics in selection of teams" and declined to play for the team in that season's Ranji Trophy, following his recent deselection from the Indian national team.

== Telangana T20 Premier League ==
HCA started Telangana T20 League in December 2017 with launching of Kaka T20 tournament across the state.

== Current office bearers ==
Ombudsman: Justice L Nageswara Rao

Administrator: K Durga Prasad

CEO: Sunil Kante
