= 2006–07 Hyderabad C.A. season =

Hyderabad C.A.
2006–07 season
- Coach: Vivek Jaisimha
- Captain: V. V. S. Laxman (FC, LA); Anirudh Singh (T20)
- Ground(s): Rajiv Gandhi International Cricket Stadium, Hyderabad (Capacity: 55,000)
- Ranji Trophy: Super Group B (3rd)
- Ranji One–Day Trophy: South Zone (4th)
- Inter State Twenty–20 Tournament: South Zone (4th)

The 2006–07 season is Hyderabad cricket team's 73rd competitive season. The Hyderabad cricket team is senior men's domestic cricket team based in the city of Hyderabad, India, run by the Hyderabad Cricket Association. They represent the region of Telangana in the state of Andhra Pradesh in domestic competitions.

== Competition overview ==
Category	Competition	Format	First match	Last match	Final position	Pld	W	L	D / T / NR	Win %
Senior men's	Ranji Trophy	First-class cricket	23 November 2006	10 January 2007	Super League Group Stage	6	2	1	3	33.33%
Senior men's	Ranji One–Day Trophy	List A cricket	10 February 2007	16 February 2007	Zonal Stage	5	1	3	1	20%
Senior men's	Inter State Twenty–20 Tournament	Twenty20 cricket	3 April 2007	7 April 2007	Zonal Stage	5	2	3	0	40%

== Squads ==
- Head Coach : Vivek Jaisimha
- Bowling Coach : Kanwaljit Singh

Ranji Trophy	Ranji One–Day Trophy	Inter State Twenty–20 Tournament
V. V. S. Laxman (c); Alfred Absolem; Anirudh Singh; Mungala Arjun; Inder Shekar Reddy; Kaushik Reddy; Ibrahim Khaleel (wk); Narender Pal Singh; Pragyan Ojha; Dwaraka Ravi Teja; Ambati Rayudu; Shashank Nag; Tirumalasetti Suman; Devishetty Vinay Kumar; Arjun Yadav	V. V. S. Laxman (c); Abhinav Kumar; Alfred Absolem; Anirudh Singh; Mungala Arjun; Ibrahim Khaleel (wk); Daniel Manohar; Naveen Reddy; Pragyan Ojha; Ambati Rayudu; Inder Shekar Reddy; Kaushik Reddy; Doddapaneni Rushi Raj; Mohammed Shakeer; Shashank Nag; Tirumalasetti Suman; Amol Shinde; Arjun Yadav	Anirudh Singh (c); Alfred Absolem; Ibrahim Khaleel (wk); Dwaraka Ravi Teja; Ambati Rayudu; Mungala Arjun; Pragyan Ojha; Doddapaneni Rushi Raj; Rohit Sabharwal; Santosh Yadav; Shashank Nag; Inder Shekar Reddy; Amol Shinde; Tirumalasetti Suman; Arjun Yadav

Rayudu and Suman returned to the Hyderabad from the Andhra while Jaisimha replaced Rajesh Yadav as the head coach of the Hyderabad ahead of the 2006–07 season.

NKP Salve Challenger Trophy

Laxman got picked to the India Green squad for the 2006-07 NKP Salve Challenger Trophy, a List-A cricket tournament in India. But, Laxman had to pull out of the tournament owing to the hamstring injury and was replaced on the eve of the first game.

Irani Cup

Ojha got selected to the Rest of India squad for the 2006 Irani Cup, a first-class cricket competition in India.

Duleep Trophy

Laxman, Rayudu, Ojha, Khaleel and Arjun Yadav got selected to the South Zone squad for the 2006-07 Duleep Trophy, a first-class cricket tournament in India.

Deodhar Trophy

Laxman, Ojha and Arjun got selected to the South Zone squad for the 2006-07 Deodhar Trophy, a List-A cricket competition in India.

== Ranji Trophy ==
The Hyderabad team, led by V. V. S. Laxman, began their campaign in the Ranji Trophy, the premier first-class cricket tournament in India, with a draw against the Maharashtra at Karad on 23 November 2006. After failure in the first two matches medium-pacer, Narender Pal Singh announced his retirement from the first-class cricket following his 13-year stint with the Hyderabad. Laxman missed after two games as he got selected to the India team for the tour to the South Africa. Anirudh Singh replaced Laxman as the captain for the rest of the tournament. They finished third in Group B of the Super League and failed to advance to the knockout stage with two wins, a loss and three draws.

=== Points Table ===
Super League Group B

Team	Pld	W	L	D	A	Pts
Bengal	6	3	0	3	0	17
Mumbai	6	3	1	2	0	15
Hyderabad	6	2	1	3	0	12
Punjab	6	0	2	4	0	8
Maharashtra	6	1	1	4	0	7
Gujarat	6	0	2	4	0	4
Rajasthan	6	1	3	2	0	4

- Top two teams advanced to the knockout stage.
- Bottom team relegated to the Plate League for the 2007–08 Ranji Trophy.
- Points system : Win by an innings or 10 wickets = 5, Win = 4, Draw with first innings lead = 2, No Result = 2, Draw with first innings deficit = 0, Loss = 0.

=== Matches ===
Group Stage

23–26 November 2006	Hyderabad	v	Maharashtra	Match Drawn Hyderabad took first innings lead
Scorecard	385 (128.1 overs); Anirudh Singh 114 (249); Anupam Sanklecha 6/60 (30.1 overs)		221 (94.3 overs); Dheeraj Jadhav 66 (172); Pragyan Ojha 6/84 (34.3 overs)	Chatrapati Shivaji Stadium, Karad; Umpires: Sudhir Asnani and Suhas Phadkar
Hyderabad won the toss and elected to bat.; Harshad Khadiwale and Nikhil Paradkar (Maharashtra); Dwaraka Ravi Teja (Hyderabad) all made their first-class debuts.

1–4 December 2006	Hyderabad	v	Rajasthan	Match Drawn Hyderabad took first innings lead
Scorecard	385 (142.4 overs); Anirudh Singh 87 (225); Mohammad Aslam 5/90 (36 overs)		353 (142.1 overs); Gagan Khoda 107 (225); Pragyan Ojha 7/114 (57.1 overs)	Sawai Mansingh Stadium, Jaipur; Umpires: Tej Handu
Scorecard	279/4 (68 overs); Ambati Rayudu 110* (152); Pankaj Singh 1/47 (14 overs)			Sawai Mansingh Stadium, Jaipur; Umpires: Tej Handu
Hyderabad won the toss and elected to bat.

9–12 December 2006	Hyderabad	v	Gujarat	Match Drawn Gujarat took first innings lead
Scorecard	205 (86.1 overs); Tirumalasetti Suman 55 (118); Amit Singh 3/30 (18 overs)		406/9d (146 overs); Niraj Patel 173 (317); Inder Shekar Reddy 4/95 (37 overs)	Rajiv Gandhi International Stadium, Hyderabad; Umpires: K. S. Giridharan and MSS Ranawat
Scorecard	225 (118.2 overs); Dwaraka Ravi Teja 72 (241); Timil Patel 3/43 (23.2 overs)		22/1 (4 overs); Bhavik Thaker 12* (9); Inder Shekar Reddy 1/12 (2 overs)	Rajiv Gandhi International Stadium, Hyderabad; Umpires: K. S. Giridharan and MSS Ranawat
Hyderabad won the toss and elected to bat.

17–20 December 2006	Mumbai	v	Hyderabad	Hyderabad won by 9 wickets
Scorecard	115 (60 overs); Amol Muzumdar 26 (72); Mungala Arjun 4/21 (16 overs)		354 (161.2 overs); Devishetty Vinay Kumar 103 (228); Ramesh Powar 7/89 (41.2 overs)	Rajiv Gandhi International Stadium, Hyderabad; Umpires: M. S. Mahal and Sanjiva Rao
Scorecard	268 (112.1 overs); Rohit Sharma 95 (195); Alfred Absolem 4/67 (25 overs)		33/1 (8.2 overs); Tirumalasetti Suman 18* (31)	Rajiv Gandhi International Stadium, Hyderabad; Umpires: M. S. Mahal and Sanjiva Rao
Hyderabad won the toss and elected to field.; Mungala Arjun (Hyderabad); Kshemal Waingankar (Mumbai) all made their first-class debuts.

2–5 January 2007	Hyderabad	v	Bengal	Bengal won by 4 wickets
Scorecard	309 (109.5 overs); Arjun Yadav 85 (190); Ashoke Dinda 4/78 (35 overs)		200 (86.2 overs); Rohan Gavaskar 66 (108); Alfred Absolem 5/52 (20.2 overs)	Rajiv Gandhi International Stadium, Hyderabad; Umpires: Ravi Deshmukh and Shashank Ranade
Scorecard	76 (42.4 overs); Tirumalasetti Suman 23 (89); Ranadeb Bose 7/25 (20 overs)		188/6 (76.4 overs); Deep Dasgupta 50* (151); Alfred Absolem 2/26 (17 overs)	Rajiv Gandhi International Stadium, Hyderabad; Umpires: Ravi Deshmukh and Shashank Ranade
Bengal won the toss and elected to field.

10–13 January 2007	Punjab	v	Hyderabad	Hyderabad won by 1 wicket
Scorecard	142 (31.3 overs); Ravneet Ricky 41 (79); Alfred Absolem 7/35 (12 overs)		251 (82 overs); V. V. S. Laxman 76 (171); V. R. V. Singh 4/79 (22 overs)	Rajiv Gandhi International Stadium, Hyderabad; Umpires: S. K. Sharma and Sankara Dendapani
Scorecard	245 (69.4 overs); Pankaj Dharmani 78 (156); Mungala Arjun 3/53 (19 overs)		137/9 (38.4 overs); Anirudh Singh 40 (70); Gagandeep Singh 4/27 (11 overs)	Rajiv Gandhi International Stadium, Hyderabad; Umpires: S. K. Sharma and Sankara Dendapani
Hyderabad won the toss and elected to field.

=== Statistics ===
Most runs

Player	Mat	Inns	Runs	Ave	SR	HS	100	50
Dwaraka Ravi Teja	5	9	393	43.66	54.05	99	0	4
Anirudh Singh	6	10	367	36.70	39.84	114	1	1
Arjun Yadav	5	9	325	36.11	47.23	85	0	2

- Source: ESPNcricinfo

Most wickets

Player	Mat	Inns	Wkts	Ave	Econ	BBI	SR	5WI	10WM
Pragyan Ojha	6	9	29	19.89	2.19	7/114	54.3	2	0
Alfred Absolem	3	6	24	12.75	2.82	7/35	27.0	2	1
Mungala Arjun	3	6	11	19.54	2.16	4/21	54.2	0	0

- Source: ESPNcricinfo

== Ranji One–Day Trophy ==
The Hyderabad, led by V. V. S. Laxman, began their campaign in the Subbaiah Pillai Trophy as part of the South Zone Ranji One–Day Trophy, a List-A cricket tournament in India, with a win against the Goa at Hyderabad on 10 February 2007. The Hyderabad suffered an early set-back but the half-centuries from Laxman and Arjun Yadav helped the Hyderabad recover to 236 which proved to be more than enough as three-wicket haul from Kaushik Reddy and two-wicket hauls from Alfred Absolem and Pragyan Ojha ensured a 49-run win against the Goa. In the second match, the tight-bowling from the Tamil Nadu bowlers helped them to restrict the Hyderabad to 188 despite the half-century from Laxman while the half-centuries from Anirudha Srikkanth and Hemang Badani ensured the Tamil Nadu an eight-wicket win. Laxman pulled himself out of the tournament after two matches citing personal reasons. Anirudh Singh replaced him as the captain for the rest of the tournament. The pull-out of Laxman from the squad immediately affected the Hyderabad as they failed to chase the target of 232 set by the Andhra in their third match as Ambati Rayudu's 40 was the only score to cross 20 while Doddapaneni Kalyankrishna was the most effective bowler for the Andhra with three-wickets to his name. Earlier, the half-century from Manoj Sai provided a strong start for the Andhra though they were pulled back by the three-wicket hauls by Ojha and Absolem in the middle. The Kerala pulled off a tie against the Hyderabad in the fourth match despite their middle-order collapse as VA Jagadeesh carried the bat with an unbeaten 95 to reach 225 with the support from Padmaja Manikantan and Vinan Nair. Earlier, the Hyderabad reached to 225 with the half-century from Shashank Nag and the cameos from Rayudu, Arjun Yadav and Anirudh. The Hyderabad lost to the Karnataka in their final group game as the three-wicket haul from Sunil Joshi and an all-round performance from Chandrashekar Raghu ensured a six-wicket win for the Karnataka. This loss eliminated the Hyderabad from the tournament as they finished fourth in the South Zone with a win, a tie and three losses.

=== Points Table ===
South Zone

Team	Pld	W	L	T	NR	Pts
Karnataka	5	5	0	0	0	23
Tamil Nadu	5	4	1	0	0	18
Kerala	5	2	2	1	0	9
Hyderabad	5	1	3	1	0	5
Goa	5	1	4	0	0	3
Andhra	5	1	4	0	0	2

- Top two teams advanced to the knockout stage.

=== Matches ===
Zonal Stage

10 February 2007	Hyderabad; 236 (49.1 overs)	v	Goa; 187/9 (50 overs)	Hyderabad won by 49 runs
Scorecard	Hyderabad; 236 (49.1 overs)	v	Goa; 187/9 (50 overs)	Rajiv Gandhi International Stadium, Hyderabad; Umpires: Kamlesh Sharma and Bhoopinder Bhatti
Scorecard	Arjun Yadav 63 (92); Saurabh Bandekar 3/42 (8.1 overs)		Swapnil Asnodkar 57 (96); Kaushik Reddy 3/56 (10 overs)	Rajiv Gandhi International Stadium, Hyderabad; Umpires: Kamlesh Sharma and Bhoopinder Bhatti
Goa won the toss and elected to field.; Naveen Reddy (Hyderabad); Badal Singh and Ryan D'Souza (Goa) all made their List-A debuts.; Points : Hyderabad 5; Goa -1				Rajiv Gandhi International Stadium, Hyderabad; Umpires: Kamlesh Sharma and Bhoopinder Bhatti

11 February 2007	Hyderabad; 188/8 (50 overs)	v	Tamil Nadu; 189/2 (36.4 overs)	Tamil Nadu won by 8 wickets
Scorecard	Hyderabad; 188/8 (50 overs)	v	Tamil Nadu; 189/2 (36.4 overs)	Rajiv Gandhi International Stadium, Hyderabad; Umpires: Milind Pathak and Bhoopinder Bhatti
Scorecard	V. V. S. Laxman 65 (109); Rajagopal Satish 2/29 (10 overs)		Srikkanth Anirudha 74 (67); V. V. S. Laxman 1/15 (4 overs)	Rajiv Gandhi International Stadium, Hyderabad; Umpires: Milind Pathak and Bhoopinder Bhatti
Tamil Nadu won the toss and elected to field.; Points : Tamil Nadu 5; Hyderabad -1				Rajiv Gandhi International Stadium, Hyderabad; Umpires: Milind Pathak and Bhoopinder Bhatti

13 February 2007	Andhra; 232 (49.5 overs)	v	Hyderabad; 141 (45.2 overs)	Andhra won by 91 runs
Scorecard	Andhra; 232 (49.5 overs)	v	Hyderabad; 141 (45.2 overs)	Rajiv Gandhi International Stadium, Hyderabad; Umpires: Ravi Subramanian and Rajesh Deshpande
Scorecard	Manoj Sai 62 (66); Pragyan Ojha 3/37 (10 overs)		Ambati Rayudu 40 (42); Doddapaneni Kalyankrishna 3/17 (6.2 overs)	Rajiv Gandhi International Stadium, Hyderabad; Umpires: Ravi Subramanian and Rajesh Deshpande
Hyderabad won the toss and elected to field.; V Sandeep and TK Ayyappa Swamy (Andhra) made their List-A debuts.; Points : Andhra 5; Hyderabad -1				Rajiv Gandhi International Stadium, Hyderabad; Umpires: Ravi Subramanian and Rajesh Deshpande

14 February 2007	Hyderabad; 225/6 (50 overs)	v	Kerala; 225/9 (50 overs)	Match Tied
Scorecard	Hyderabad; 225/6 (50 overs)	v	Kerala; 225/9 (50 overs)	Rajiv Gandhi International Stadium, Hyderabad; Umpires: Sanjay Hazare and Anil Dandekar
Scorecard	Shashank Nag 50 (106); Anil Kumar 1/29 (7 overs)		VA Jagadeesh 95* (137); Alfred Absolem 3/30 (8 overs)	Rajiv Gandhi International Stadium, Hyderabad; Umpires: Sanjay Hazare and Anil Dandekar
Kerala won the toss and elected to field.; Mohammed Shakeer (Hyderabad) made his List-A debut.; Points : Hyderabad 2; Kerala 2				Rajiv Gandhi International Stadium, Hyderabad; Umpires: Sanjay Hazare and Anil Dandekar

16 February 2007	Hyderabad; 189 (50 overs)	v	Karnataka; 190/4 (44.5 overs)	Karnataka won by 6 wickets
Scorecard	Hyderabad; 189 (50 overs)	v	Karnataka; 190/4 (44.5 overs)	Rajiv Gandhi International Stadium, Hyderabad; Umpires: Mukund Mandale and MS Pawar
Scorecard	Arjun Yadav 56 (106); Sunil Joshi 2/18 (10 overs)		Bharat Chipli 45 (65); Inder Shekar Reddy 2/34 (10 overs)	Rajiv Gandhi International Stadium, Hyderabad; Umpires: Mukund Mandale and MS Pawar
Karnataka won the toss and elected to field.; K. B. Pawan (Karnataka) made his List-A debut.; Points : Karnataka 4; Hyderabad 0				Rajiv Gandhi International Stadium, Hyderabad; Umpires: Mukund Mandale and MS Pawar

=== Statistics ===
Most runs

Player	Mat	Inns	Runs	Ave	SR	HS	100	50
Arjun Yadav	5	5	173	34.60	55.62	63	0	2
V. V. S. Laxman	2	2	126	63.00	60.57	65	0	2
Ambati Rayudu	5	5	107	21.40	81.67	40	0	0

- Source: ESPNcricinfo

Most wickets

Player	Mat	Inns	Wkts	Ave	Econ	BBI	SR	4WI	5WI
Alfred Absolem	5	5	8	23.87	4.47	3/30	32.0	0	0
Inder Shekar Reddy	5	5	7	24.28	3.61	2/34	40.2	0	0
Pragyan Ojha	5	5	6	34.00	4.34	3/37	47.0	0	0

- Source: ESPNcricinfo

== Inter State Twenty–20 Tournament ==
The Hyderabad team, led by Anirudh Singh, began their campaign in the Inter State Twenty–20 Tournament, a maiden domestic Twenty20 cricket tournament in India, with a win against the Goa at Visakhapatnam on 3 April 2007. Playing their first-ever T-20 match, brisk scoring of Tirumalasetti Suman at the start and Ibrahim Khaleel at the end helped the Hyderabad post 158 in 20 overs despite the middle-order collapse while the three-wicket hauls from Inder Shekar Reddy and Amol Shinde ensured the Hyderabad a 21-run win against the Goa. In the second match, the half-century from Khaleel helped the Hyderabad recover from their top-order collapse to 132 but the collective effort from the Kerala batsmen ensured the Kerala chase the target with five-wicket to spare. The collective bowling effort from the Tamil Nadu and an unbeaten 40-run knock from Subramaniam Badrinath helped them to defeat the Hyderabad in the third match by six wickets. In the fourth match, an unbeaten half-century from Ambati Rayudu along with a 40-run knock from Doddapaneni Rushi Raj helped the Hyderabad post 184 while the run-outs at the start and five-wickets shared between Pragyan Ojha and Shivaji Yadav helped them bowl out the Andhra for 88. The Hyderabad lost to the Karnataka in their last zonal match as they finished fourth in the South Zone and failed to advance to the Group stage with two wins and three losses. The Hyderabad batting collapsed once again in this tournament posting only 131 in 20 overs as Dwaraka Ravi Teja and Shashank Nag were the only people to score above 20 while the batting contributions from Robin Uthappa, Chandrashekar Raghu and Deepak Chougule helped the Karnataka chase the target with six wickets to spare.

=== Points Table ===
South Zone

Team	Pld	W	L	T	NR	Pts
Tamil Nadu	5	5	0	0	0	20
Karnataka	5	4	1	0	0	16
Goa	5	2	3	0	0	8
Hyderabad	5	2	3	0	0	8
Andhra	5	1	4	0	0	4
Kerala	5	1	4	0	0	4

- Top two teams advanced to the Group stage.
- Points Classification : 4 for Win; 2 for Tie/No-Result; 0 for Loss

=== Matches ===
Zonal Stage

3 April 2007	Hyderabad; 158/8 (20 overs)	v	Goa; 137 (20 overs)	Hyderabad won by 21 runs
Scorecard	Hyderabad; 158/8 (20 overs)	v	Goa; 137 (20 overs)	Hindustan Zinc Limited Ground, Visakhapatnam; Umpires: SM Raju and Seetharam Prabhu
Scorecard	Tirumalasetti Suman 42 (27); Shadab Jakati 3/20 (4 overs)		Sagun Kamat 36 (34); Amol Shinde 3/17 (4 overs)	Hindustan Zinc Limited Ground, Visakhapatnam; Umpires: SM Raju and Seetharam Prabhu
Hyderabad won the toss and elected to bat.; Sagun Kamat, Swapnil Asnodkar, Damodar Redker, Shadab Jakati, Saurabh Bandekar, Aniket Desai, Saahil Dhuri, Advait Katkar, Aditya Angle, Amit Yadav and Ryan D'Souza (Goa); Tirumalasetti Suman, Doddapaneni Rushi Raj, Ambati Rayudu, Arjun Yadav, Anirudh Singh, Ibrahim Khaleel, Amol Shinde, Santosh Yadav, Mungala Arjun, Alfred Absolem and Inder Shekar Reddy (Hyderabad) all made their T20 debuts.				Hindustan Zinc Limited Ground, Visakhapatnam; Umpires: SM Raju and Seetharam Prabhu

4 April 2007	Hyderabad; 132/7 (20 overs)	v	Kerala; 135/5 (19 overs)	Kerala won by 5 wickets
Scorecard	Hyderabad; 132/7 (20 overs)	v	Kerala; 135/5 (19 overs)	Dr. Y.S. Rajasekhara Reddy ACA-VDCA Cricket Stadium, Visakhapatnam; Umpires: Sundaram Ravi
Scorecard	Ibrahim Khaleel 68 (42); KJ Rakesh 2/19 (4 overs)		VA Jagadeesh 33* (31); Pragyan Ojha 3/33 (4 overs)	Dr. Y.S. Rajasekhara Reddy ACA-VDCA Cricket Stadium, Visakhapatnam; Umpires: Sundaram Ravi
Hyderabad won the toss and elected to bat.; Dwaraka Ravi Teja, Rohit Sabharwal and Pragyan Ojha (Hyderabad) made their T20 debuts.				Dr. Y.S. Rajasekhara Reddy ACA-VDCA Cricket Stadium, Visakhapatnam; Umpires: Sundaram Ravi

5 April 2007	Hyderabad; 116/9 (20 overs)	v	Tamil Nadu; 117/4 (17.4 overs)	Tamil Nadu won by 6 wickets
Scorecard	Hyderabad; 116/9 (20 overs)	v	Tamil Nadu; 117/4 (17.4 overs)	Dr. Y.S. Rajasekhara Reddy ACA-VDCA Cricket Stadium, Visakhapatnam; Umpires: Seetharam Prabhu and Nitin Pai
Scorecard	Doddapaneni Rushi Raj 46 (34); Ravichandran Ashwin 3/15 (4 overs)		Subramaniam Badrinath 40* (33); Pragyan Ojha 3/15 (4 overs)	Dr. Y.S. Rajasekhara Reddy ACA-VDCA Cricket Stadium, Visakhapatnam; Umpires: Seetharam Prabhu and Nitin Pai
Tamil Nadu won the toss and elected to field.				Dr. Y.S. Rajasekhara Reddy ACA-VDCA Cricket Stadium, Visakhapatnam; Umpires: Seetharam Prabhu and Nitin Pai

6 April 2007	Hyderabad; 184/4 (20 overs)	v	Andhra; 88 (15.4 overs)	Hyderabad won by 96 runs
Scorecard	Hyderabad; 184/4 (20 overs)	v	Andhra; 88 (15.4 overs)	Dr. Y.S. Rajasekhara Reddy ACA-VDCA Cricket Stadium, Visakhapatnam; Umpires: T. R. Kashyappan
Scorecard	Ambati Rayudu 75* (42); Yalaka Venugopal Rao 2/23 (4 overs)		Gnaneswara Rao 35 (32); Santosh Yadav 3/10 (1.4 overs)	Dr. Y.S. Rajasekhara Reddy ACA-VDCA Cricket Stadium, Visakhapatnam; Umpires: T. R. Kashyappan
Hyderabad won the toss and elected to bat.; Shashank Nag (Hyderabad) made his T20 debut.				Dr. Y.S. Rajasekhara Reddy ACA-VDCA Cricket Stadium, Visakhapatnam; Umpires: T. R. Kashyappan

7 April 2007	Hyderabad; 131/9 (20 overs)	v	Karnataka; 135/4 (19.3 overs)	Karnataka won by 6 wickets
Scorecard	Hyderabad; 131/9 (20 overs)	v	Karnataka; 135/4 (19.3 overs)	Dr. Y.S. Rajasekhara Reddy ACA-VDCA Cricket Stadium, Visakhapatnam; Umpires: T. R. Kashyappan
Scorecard	Dwaraka Ravi Teja 36 (30); Rajoo Bhatkal 2/9 (2 overs)		Robin Uthappa 46 (28); Santosh Yadav 2/15 (4 overs)	Dr. Y.S. Rajasekhara Reddy ACA-VDCA Cricket Stadium, Visakhapatnam; Umpires: T. R. Kashyappan
Hyderabad won the toss and elected to bat.; Amit Verma (Karnataka) made his T20 debut.				Dr. Y.S. Rajasekhara Reddy ACA-VDCA Cricket Stadium, Visakhapatnam; Umpires: T. R. Kashyappan

=== Statistics ===
Most runs

Player	Mat	Inns	Runs	Ave	SR	HS	100	50
Ibrahim Khaleel	5	5	141	35.25	153.26	68*	0	1
Ambati Rayudu	5	5	114	28.50	121.27	75*	0	1
Doddapaneni Rushi Raj	4	4	111	27.75	133.73	46	0	0

- Source: ESPNcricinfo

Most wickets

Player	Mat	Inns	Wkts	Ave	Econ	BBI	SR	4WI	5WI
Pragyan Ojha	4	4	9	11.77	6.62	3/15	10.6	0	0
Santosh Yadav	3	3	5	9.00	5.86	3/10	9.2	0	0
Inder Shekar Reddy	4	4	5	14.00	5.00	3/20	16.8	0	0

- Source: ESPNcricinfo

== See also ==
- Hyderabad cricket team
- Hyderabad Cricket Association
