= 2005–06 Hyderabad C.A. season =

Hyderabad C.A.
2005–06 season
- Coach: Rajesh Yadav
- Captain: Arjun Yadav
- Ground(s): Rajiv Gandhi International Cricket Stadium, Hyderabad; Gymkhana Ground, Hyderabad
- Ranji Trophy: Elite Group B (4th)
- Ranji One–Day Trophy: South Zone (6th)

The 2005–06 season is Hyderabad cricket team's 72nd competitive season. The Hyderabad cricket team is senior men's domestic cricket team based in the city of Hyderabad, India, run by the Hyderabad Cricket Association. They represent the region of Telangana in the state of Andhra Pradesh in domestic competitions.

== Competition overview ==
| Category | Competition | Format | First match | Last match | Final position | Pld | W | L | D / T / NR | Win % |
|---|---|---|---|---|---|---|---|---|---|---|
| Senior men's | Ranji Trophy | First-class cricket | 1 December 2005 | 10 January 2006 | Elite Group Stage | 6 | 1 | 3 | 2 | 16.66% |
| Senior men's | Ranji One–Day Trophy | List A cricket | 10 February 2006 | 16 February 2006 | Zonal Stage | 5 | 0 | 5 | 0 | 0% |

== Squads ==
- Head coach: Rajesh Yadav

| Ranji Trophy | Ranji One–Day Trophy |
|---|---|
| Arjun Yadav (c); Daniel Manohar; Shashank Nag; Anirudh Singh; Devishetty Vinay Kumar; Abhinav Kumar; Ibrahim Khaleel (wk); Pragyan Ojha; Inder Shekar Reddy; Kaushik Reddy; Pagadala Niranjan; Amol Shinde; Anoop Pai; Alfred Absolem; V. V. S. Laxman; Narender Pal Singh | Arjun Yadav (c); Alfred Absolem; Anirudh Singh; Anoop Pai; Mungala Arjun; Kaushik Reddy; Ibrahim Khaleel (wk); Narender Pal Singh; Pagadala Niranjan; Pragyan Ojha; Inder Shekar Reddy; Shashank Nag; Amol Shinde; Syed Quadri; Devishetty Vinay Kumar |

Rayudu and Suman moved from the Hyderabad to the Andhra ahead of the 2005–06 season.

NKP Salve Challenger Trophy

Laxman got picked to the India A squad for the 2005-06 NKP Salve Challenger Trophy, a List-A cricket tournament in India.

Duleep Trophy

Laxman, Anirudh, Ojha, Arjun Yadav and Khaleel got selected to the South Zone squad for the 2005-06 Duleep Trophy, a first-class cricket tournament in India. But, Laxman later withdrew himself from the squad.

Deodhar Trophy

Inder Shekar, Vinay Kumar and Khaleel got selected to the South Zone squad for the 2005-06 Deodhar Trophy, a List-A cricket competition in India.

== Ranji Trophy ==
The Hyderabad team, led by Arjun Yadav, began their campaign in the Ranji Trophy, the premier first-class cricket tournament in India, with a draw against the Andhra at Anantapur on 1 December 2005. The Hyderabad captain, Arjun Yadav attacked his opponent and former teammate Ambati Rayudu with stumps following his dismissal and altercation between Rayudu and Hyderabad players during the Hyderabad's second innings on the final day of the match against Andhra. They finished fourth in Group B of the Elite League and failed to advance to the knockout stage with a win, three losses and two draws.

=== Points Table ===
Elite Group B

| Team | Pld | W | L | D | A | Pts |
|---|---|---|---|---|---|---|
| Baroda | 6 | 3 | 0 | 3 | 0 | 19 |
| Uttar Pradesh | 6 | 2 | 2 | 2 | 0 | 13 |
| Punjab | 6 | 2 | 1 | 3 | 0 | 11 |
| Hyderabad | 6 | 1 | 3 | 2 | 0 | 9 |
| Haryana | 6 | 1 | 1 | 4 | 0 | 8 |
| Andhra | 6 | 1 | 1 | 4 | 0 | 7 |
| Services | 6 | 0 | 2 | 4 | 0 | 0 |

- Top two teams advanced to the knockout stage.
- Bottom team relegated to the Plate Group for the 2006–07 Ranji Trophy.
- Points system : Win by an innings or 10 wickets = 5, Win = 4, Draw with first innings lead = 2, No Result = 2, Draw with first innings deficit = 0, Loss = 0.

=== Matches ===
Group Stage

| 1–4 December 2005 | Hyderabad | v | Andhra | Match Drawn Hyderabad took first innings lead |
| Scorecard | 370 (157.5 overs); Ibrahim Khaleel 128* (258); Syed Shahabuddin 3/95 (35 overs) | | 231 (84.2 overs); Gnaneshwara Rao 63 (114); Kaushik Reddy 4/43 (23.2 overs) | Rural Development Trust Stadium, Anantapur; Umpires: Sudhir Asnani and K. S. Giridharan |
| Scorecard | 80 (31 overs); Abhinav Kumar 24 (43); Syed Shahabuddin 7/44 (16 overs) | | 133/6 (26.4 overs); Ambati Rayudu 50 (46); Inder Shekar Reddy 3/51 (11.4 overs) | Rural Development Trust Stadium, Anantapur; Umpires: Sudhir Asnani and K. S. Giridharan |
Hyderabad won the toss and elected to bat.; Lakshman Kishore (Andhra); Abhinav Kumar and Amol Shinde (Hyderabad) all made their first-class debuts.

| 9–12 December 2005 | Hyderabad | v | Punjab | Punjab won by an innings and 151 runs |
| Scorecard | 200 (59 overs); Anirudh Singh 49 (88); Gagandeep Singh 4/46 (19 overs) | | 550/7d (159 overs); Ravneet Ricky 180 (398); Narender Pal Singh 4/108 (34 overs) | Punjab Cricket Association IS Bindra Stadium, Mohali; Umpires: Francis Gomes and Balwant Sharma |
| Scorecard | 199 (48.4 overs); Ibrahim Khaleel 102 (119); Gagandeep Singh 5/54 (15.4 overs) | | | Punjab Cricket Association IS Bindra Stadium, Mohali; Umpires: Francis Gomes and Balwant Sharma |
Punjab won the toss and elected to field.; Sunny Sohal, Uday Kaul and Harvinder Sandhu (Punjab); Anoop Pai and Alfred Absolem (Hyderabad) all made their first-class debuts.

| 17–20 December 2005 | Hyderabad | v | Haryana | Match Drawn Hyderabad took first innings lead |
| Scorecard | 328 (120.1 overs); Anirudh Singh 86 (131); Joginder Sharma 5/96 (40 overs) | | 168 (83.3 overs); Sunny Singh 22 (91); Inder Shekar Reddy 4/40 (28.3 overs) | Rajiv Gandhi International Stadium, Hyderabad; Umpires: Sudhir Asnani and Subroto Porel |
| Scorecard | 190/9d (69.3 overs); Ibrahim Khaleel 53 (134); Joginder Sharma 5/56 (18 overs) | | 284/6 (78 overs); Deepak Joon 102* (214); Pragyan Ojha 4/121 (27 overs) | Rajiv Gandhi International Stadium, Hyderabad; Umpires: Sudhir Asnani and Subroto Porel |
Hyderabad won the toss and elected to bat.

| 25–28 December 2005 | Services | v | Hyderabad | Hyderabad won by an innings and 138 runs |
| Scorecard | 196 (71.1 overs); Arun Sharma 40 (79); Kaushik Reddy 5/57 (20 overs) | | 415 (152 overs); Anirudh Singh 95 (250); Fazil Mohammed 4/104 (47 overs) | Gymkhana Ground, Hyderabad; Umpires: Suresh Shastri and Sameer Bandekar |
| Scorecard | 81 (31.1 overs); Krushnasinh Chawda 22 (67); Kaushik Reddy 6/31 (13 overs) | | | Gymkhana Ground, Hyderabad; Umpires: Suresh Shastri and Sameer Bandekar |
Hyderabad won the toss and elected to field.

| 3–6 January 2006 | Hyderabad | v | Uttar Pradesh | Uttar Pradesh won by 10 wickets |
| Scorecard | 142 (55.4 overs); Shashank Nag 42 (80); Piyush Chawla 3/20 (8.4 overs) | | 340 (112.5 overs); Shivakant Shukla 116 (195); Pragyan Ojha 6/128 (38.5 overs) | K. D. Singh Babu Stadium, Lucknow; Umpires: Amiesh Saheba and H. S. Sekhon |
| Scorecard | 227 (77.4 overs); Arjun Yadav 49 (92); Piyush Chawla 5/37 (23.4 overs) | | 32/0 (9.4 overs); Shivakant Shukla 20* (29) | K. D. Singh Babu Stadium, Lucknow; Umpires: Amiesh Saheba and H. S. Sekhon |
Hyderabad won the toss and elected to bat.

| 10–13 January 2006 | Baroda | v | Hyderabad | Baroda won by 220 runs |
| Scorecard | 229 (76.1 overs); Connor Williams 63 (131); Alfred Absolem 4/51 (20 overs) | | 131 (54.4 overs); Anirudh Singh 22 (66); Shekhar Joshi 4/15 (15.3 overs) | Moti Bagh Stadium, Vadodara; Umpires: Krishna Hariharan and M. S. Mahal |
| Scorecard | 272 (81 overs); Kiran Powar 94 (183); Pragyan Ojha 7/126 (28 overs) | | 150 (44.2 overs); Arjun Yadav 30 (32); Yusuf Pathan 5/30 (13.2 overs) | Moti Bagh Stadium, Vadodara; Umpires: Krishna Hariharan and M. S. Mahal |
Hyderabad won the toss and elected to field.; Swapnil Singh (Baroda) made his first-class debut.

=== Statistics ===
Most runs

| Player | Mat | Inns | Runs | Ave | SR | HS | 100 | 50 |
|---|---|---|---|---|---|---|---|---|
| Ibrahim Khaleel | 6 | 11 | 402 | 40.20 | 47.74 | 128* | 2 | 1 |
| Anirudh Singh | 6 | 11 | 379 | 34.45 | 45.71 | 95 | 0 | 3 |
| Devishetty Vinay Kumar | 5 | 9 | 231 | 25.66 | 38.50 | 90 | 0 | 1 |

- Source: ESPNcricinfo

Most wickets

| Player | Mat | Inns | Wkts | Ave | Econ | BBI | SR | 5WI | 10WM |
|---|---|---|---|---|---|---|---|---|---|
| Pragyan Ojha | 5 | 9 | 24 | 28.41 | 3.61 | 7/126 | 47.2 | 2 | 0 |
| Kaushik Reddy | 6 | 11 | 23 | 23.91 | 2.98 | 6/31 | 48.1 | 2 | 1 |
| Inder Shekar Reddy | 5 | 10 | 22 | 19.09 | 2.13 | 4/28 | 53.7 | 0 | 0 |

- Source: ESPNcricinfo

== Ranji One–Day Trophy ==
The Hyderabad team, led by Arjun Yadav, began their campaign in the Subbaiah Pillai Trophy as part of the South Zone Ranji One–Day Trophy, a List-A cricket tournament in India, with a loss against the Goa at Hyderabad on 10 February 2006. The century from Chandrashekar Raghu and five-wickets shared between Sunil Joshi and Balachandra Akhil ensured the Karnataka win by 72 runs. The Hyderabad lost in a low-scoring thriller to the Andhra by one run in the second match as the half-centuries from Ambati Rayudu and Gnaneswara Rao completed the chase for the Andhra despite 123-run partnership between Devishetty Vinay Kumar and Ibrahim Khaleel for the Hyderabad. The century from Hemang Badani and tight bowling by the Tamil Nadu bowlers with Ganapathi Vignesh and Sridharan Sriram taking the key wickets gave the Hyderabad their third loss of the tournament as the Tamil Nadu defeated the Hyderabad by 66 runs. Sony Cheruvathur's four-wicket haul and the century from Somasetty Suresh ensured the Kerala defeat the Hyderabad by seven wickets in their fourth match of the tournament. The Hyderabad top-order collapsed but the 100-run stand between Amol Shinde and Syed Quadri helped them recover to 189 before Suresh completed the chase for the Kerala. The Hyderabad suffered their fifth straight loss in the tournament as the collective effort from the Goa and the half-century from Sagun Kamat and brisk scoring at the end by Kapil Angle helped the Goa win over the Hyderabad by one wicket. The Hyderabad finished last in the South Zone and failed to qualify to the knockout stage with no wins and five losses.

=== Points Table ===
South Zone

| Team | Pld | W | L | T | NR | Pts |
|---|---|---|---|---|---|---|
| Karnataka | 5 | 5 | 0 | 0 | 0 | 24 |
| Tamil Nadu | 5 | 4 | 1 | 0 | 0 | 17 |
| Kerala | 5 | 3 | 2 | 0 | 0 | 14 |
| Andhra | 5 | 2 | 3 | 0 | 0 | 8 |
| Goa | 5 | 1 | 4 | 0 | 0 | 0 |
| Hyderabad | 5 | 0 | 5 | 0 | 0 | -3 |

- Top two teams advanced to the knockout stage.

=== Matches ===
Zonal Stage

| 10 February 2006 | Karnataka; 260/8 (50 overs) | v | Hyderabad; 188/9 (50 overs) | Karnataka won by 72 runs |
| Scorecard | Karnataka; 260/8 (50 overs) | v | Hyderabad; 188/9 (50 overs) | Rajiv Gandhi International Stadium, Hyderabad; Umpires: Ravi Subramanian and Ajit Datar |
| Scorecard | Chandrashekar Raghu 117 (113); Kaushik Reddy 2/32 (10 overs) | | Amol Shinde 44* (53); Sunil Joshi 3/28 (10 overs) | Rajiv Gandhi International Stadium, Hyderabad; Umpires: Ravi Subramanian and Ajit Datar |
| Hyderabad won the toss and elected to field.; Anoop Pai, Amol Shinde, Alfred Absolem and Mungala Arjun (Hyderabad); Bharat Chipli and Rajoo Bhatkal (Karnataka) all made their List-A debuts.; Hyderabad replacement : Anoop Pai for Mungala Arjun; Points : Karnataka 5; Hyderabad -1 | | | | Rajiv Gandhi International Stadium, Hyderabad; Umpires: Ravi Subramanian and Ajit Datar |

| 11 February 2006 | Andhra; 205 (49.4 overs) | v | Hyderabad; 204/8 (50 overs) | Andhra won by 1 run |
| Scorecard | Andhra; 205 (49.4 overs) | v | Hyderabad; 204/8 (50 overs) | Gymkhana Ground, Hyderabad; Umpires: Ravi Subramanian and Ajit Datar |
| Scorecard | Ambati Rayudu 50 (56); Kaushik Reddy 3/36 (9.4 overs) | | Devishetty Vinay Kumar 74 (99); Doddapaneni Kalyankrishna 4/29 (10 overs) | Gymkhana Ground, Hyderabad; Umpires: Ravi Subramanian and Ajit Datar |
| Hyderabad won the toss and elected to field.; Andhra replacement : Arjun Kumar for VVB Reddy; Hyderabad replacement : Syed Quadri for Narender Pal Singh; Points : Andhra 4; Hyderabad 0 | | | | Gymkhana Ground, Hyderabad; Umpires: Ravi Subramanian and Ajit Datar |

| 13 February 2006 | Tamil Nadu; 264 (46.5 overs) | v | Hyderabad; 198 (45.3 overs) | Tamil Nadu won by 66 runs |
| Scorecard | Tamil Nadu; 264 (46.5 overs) | v | Hyderabad; 198 (45.3 overs) | Gymkhana Ground, Hyderabad; Umpires: Chandrakanth Mhase and Abhik Mitra |
| Scorecard | Hemang Badani 109 (77); Alfred Absolem 3/51 (8 overs) | | Devishetty Vinay Kumar 58 (49); Sridharan Sriram 2/24 (6 overs) | Gymkhana Ground, Hyderabad; Umpires: Chandrakanth Mhase and Abhik Mitra |
| Tamil Nadu won the toss and elected to bat.; Dwaraka Ravi Teja and Pragyan Ojha (Hyderabad) made their List-A debuts.; Tamil Nadu replacement : Huzefa Patel for C. Ganapathy; Hyderabad replacement : Syed Quadri for Pragyan Ojha; Points : Tamil Nadu 5; Hyderabad -1 | | | | Gymkhana Ground, Hyderabad; Umpires: Chandrakanth Mhase and Abhik Mitra |

| 14 February 2006 | Hyderabad; 189/8 (50 overs) | v | Kerala; 193/3 (36 overs) | Kerala won by 7 wickets |
| Scorecard | Hyderabad; 189/8 (50 overs) | v | Kerala; 193/3 (36 overs) | Gymkhana Ground, Hyderabad; Umpires: Vijay Chopra and Abhik Mitra |
| Scorecard | Amol Shinde 61 (69); Sony Cheruvathur 4/38 (10 overs) | | Somasetty Suresh 107* (119); Alfred Absolem 2/47 (10 overs) | Gymkhana Ground, Hyderabad; Umpires: Vijay Chopra and Abhik Mitra |
| Kerala won the toss and elected to field.; Kerala replacement : Abhishek Hegde for Prasanth Chandran; Hyderabad replacement : Syed Quadri for Pragyan Ojha; Points : Kerala 5; Hyderabad -1 | | | | Gymkhana Ground, Hyderabad; Umpires: Vijay Chopra and Abhik Mitra |

| 16 February 2006 | Hyderabad; 226 (49.2 overs) | v | Goa; 227/9 (50 overs) | Goa won by 1 wicket |
| Scorecard | Hyderabad; 226 (49.2 overs) | v | Goa; 227/9 (50 overs) | Rajiv Gandhi International Stadium, Hyderabad; Umpires: Amardeep Pathania and Rajiv Risodkar |
| Scorecard | Devishetty Vinay Kumar 37 (57); Sher Yadav 3/44 (10 overs) | | Sagun Kamat 81 (116); Alfred Absolem 2/36 (9 overs) | Rajiv Gandhi International Stadium, Hyderabad; Umpires: Amardeep Pathania and Rajiv Risodkar |
| Goa won the toss and elected to field.; Goa replacement : Shadab Jakati for Narayan Kambli; Hyderabad replacement : Mungala Arjun for Devishetty Vinay Kumar; Points : Goa 4; Hyderabad 0 | | | | Rajiv Gandhi International Stadium, Hyderabad; Umpires: Amardeep Pathania and Rajiv Risodkar |

=== Statistics ===
Most runs

| Player | Mat | Inns | Runs | Ave | SR | HS | 100 | 50 |
|---|---|---|---|---|---|---|---|---|
| Devishetty Vinay Kumar | 5 | 5 | 184 | 36.80 | 77.31 | 74 | 0 | 2 |
| Amol Shinde | 5 | 5 | 183 | 61.00 | 96.82 | 61 | 0 | 1 |
| Ibrahim Khaleel | 5 | 5 | 117 | 23.40 | 46.06 | 54 | 0 | 1 |

- Source: ESPNcricinfo

Most wickets

| Player | Mat | Inns | Wkts | Ave | Econ | BBI | SR | 4WI | 5WI |
|---|---|---|---|---|---|---|---|---|---|
| Kaushik Reddy | 5 | 5 | 10 | 20.20 | 4.86 | 3/36 | 24.9 | 0 | 0 |
| Alfred Absolem | 5 | 5 | 9 | 24.00 | 4.69 | 3/51 | 30.6 | 0 | 0 |
| Inder Shekar Reddy | 5 | 5 | 4 | 49.50 | 4.40 | 2/50 | 67.5 | 0 | 0 |

- Source: ESPNcricinfo

== See also ==
- Hyderabad cricket team
- Hyderabad Cricket Association
