= 2007–08 Hyderabad C.A. season =

Hyderabad C.A.
2007–08 season
- Coach: Vivek Jaisimha
- Captain: V. V. S. Laxman (FC); Arjun Yadav (LA)
- Ground(s): Rajiv Gandhi International Cricket Stadium, Hyderabad (Capacity: 55,000)
- Ranji Trophy: Super Group B (6th)
- Vijay Hazare Trophy: South Zone (3rd)

The 2007–08 season is Hyderabad cricket team's 74th competitive season. The Hyderabad cricket team is senior men's domestic cricket team based in the city of Hyderabad, India, run by the Hyderabad Cricket Association. They represent the region of Telangana in the state of Andhra Pradesh in domestic competitions.

== Background ==
In the beginning of the season, seven Ranji players signed up to play in Indian Cricket League (ICL), a private cricket league funded by Zee Entertainment Enterprises but not approved by Board of Control for Cricket in India (BCCI). Earlier, BCCI said that the players signed with ICL will be banned for life from playing in India and also barred the ICL players from taking part in all domestic tournaments which led to the exclusion of ICL players from Hyderabad squad. The list include former India U-19 captain, Ambati Rayudu. The others were Devishetty Vinay Kumar, Ibrahim Khaleel, Anirudh Singh, Shashank Nag, Inder Shekar Reddy and Kaushik Reddy. The luring of domestic players by ICL also led BCCI to counter the rebel T20 league by starting their own franchise-based T20 competition called Indian Premier League whose first season was slated to start in April 2008.

== Competition overview ==
Category	Competition	Format	First match	Last match	Final position	Pld	W	L	D / T / NR	Win %
Senior men's	Ranji Trophy	First-class cricket	4 November 2007	25 December 2007	Super League Group Stage	6	1	2	3	16.67%
Senior men's	Vijay Hazare Trophy	List A cricket	26 February 2008	3 March 2008	Zonal Stage	5	2	3	0	40%

== Squads ==
- Head Coach : Vivek Jaisimha
- Bowling Coach : Kanwaljit Singh

Ranji Trophy	Vijay Hazare Trophy
V. V. S. Laxman (c); Mohammed Khader; Lalith Mohan; Vishal Sharma; Habeeb Ahmed (wk); Mungala Arjun; Daniel Manohar; Pragyan Ojha; Anoop Pai; Danny Dereck Prince; Dwaraka Ravi Teja; Mohammed Shakeer; Amol Shinde; Shoaib Ahmed; Ashwin Yadav; Arjun Yadav	Arjun Yadav (c); Abhinav Kumar (wk); Mungala Arjun; Pragyan Ojha; Anoop Pai; Dwaraka Ravi Teja; Ronald Rodrigues; Doddapaneni Rushi Raj; Sarvesh Kumar; Mohammed Shakeer; Amol Shinde; Ashwin Yadav; Paramveer Singh; Vishal Sharma

Irani Cup

Arjun Yadav and Ojha got selected to the Rest of India squad for the 2007 Irani Cup, a first-class cricket competition in India.

NKP Salve Challenger Trophy

Ojha got picked to the India Red squad while Arjun Yadav got picked to the India Blue squad for the 2007-08 NKP Salve Challenger Trophy, a List-A cricket tournament in India.

Duleep Trophy

Ojha, Ravi Teja and Arjun Yadav got selected to the South Zone squad for the 2007-08 Duleep Trophy, a first-class cricket tournament in India.

Deodhar Trophy

Laxman, Ojha, Sarvesh and Arjun Yadav got selected to the South Zone squad for the 2007-08 Deodhar Trophy, a List-A cricket competition in India.

Indian Premier League

The local franchise, Deccan Chargers signed Laxman from the auction and picked Ojha, Ravi Teja, Sarvesh and Arjun Yadav for their uncapped Indians players for the newly formed Indian Premier League, a professional Twenty20 cricket league in India, in its inaugural season.

== Ranji Trophy ==
The Hyderabad team, led by V. V. S. Laxman, began their campaign in the Ranji Trophy, the premier first-class cricket tournament in India, with a draw against the Bengal at Kolkata on 4 November 2007. Pragyan Ojha led the team after two matches in the absence of Laxman as he was selected for the Pakistan tour of India and the India tour of Australia. They finished sixth in Group B of the Super League and failed to advance to the knockout stage with one win, two losses and three draws.

=== Points Table ===
Super League Group B

Team	Pld	W	L	D	A	Pts	Q
Uttar Pradesh	6	3	1	2	0	19	1.410
Baroda	6	2	0	4	0	19	1.261
Andhra	6	2	1	3	0	17	1.237
Orissa	6	2	3	1	0	13	0.873
Punjab	6	1	1	4	0	13	0.810
Hyderabad	6	1	2	3	0	10	0.778
Bengal	6	1	4	1	0	8	0.793

- Top two teams advanced to the knockout stage.
- Bottom team relegated to the Plate League for the 2008–09 Ranji Trophy.
- Points system : Win by an innings or 10 wickets = 6, Win = 5, Draw with first innings lead = 3, Draw with first innings deficit = 1, No Result = 1, Loss = 0.

=== Matches ===
Group Stage

4–7 November 2007	Bengal	v	Hyderabad	Match Drawn Bengal took first innings lead
Scorecard	461 (145.1 overs); Manoj Tiwary 203 (283); Pragyan Ojha 4/151 (51.1 overs)		227 (79.1 overs); Amol Shinde 90 (181); Saurasish Lahiri 4/65 (20.1 overs)	Eden Gardens, Kolkata; Umpires: Shavir Tarapore and Vishwas Nerurkar
Scorecard			302/6 (115 overs) (f/o); Anoop Pai 119* (262); Murtaza Lodhgar 5/68 (40 overs)	Eden Gardens, Kolkata; Umpires: Shavir Tarapore and Vishwas Nerurkar
Bengal won the toss and elected to bat.; Wriddhiman Saha (Bengal); Habeeb Ahmed, Shoaib Ahmed and Lalith Mohan (Hyderabad) all made their first-class debuts.

15–18 November 2007	Hyderabad	v	Punjab	Match Drawn Hyderabad took first innings lead
Scorecard	379 (105.3 overs); Daniel Manohar 119 (215); Ankur Kakkar 4/55 (22.3 overs)		356 (124 overs); Karan Goel 75 (150); Pragyan Ojha 3/127 (47 overs)	Punjab Cricket Association IS Bindra Stadium, Mohali; Umpires: Milind Pathak and Yashwanth Gokhale
Scorecard	276 (85.5 overs); Dwaraka Ravi Teja 111 (169); Sarabjit Ladda 4/30 (12.5 overs)		75/4 (28 overs); Karan Goel 29 (46); Ashwin Yadav 3/32 (6 overs)	Punjab Cricket Association IS Bindra Stadium, Mohali; Umpires: Milind Pathak and Yashwanth Gokhale
Punjab won the toss and elected to field.; Birinder Singh (Punjab); Mohammed Khader and Ashwin Yadav (Hyderabad) all made their first-class debuts.

23–26 November 2007	Hyderabad	v	Baroda	Match Drawn Baroda took first innings lead
Scorecard	261 (103.2 overs); Dwaraka Ravi Teja 72 (118); Irfan Pathan 4/71 (25 overs)		476/9d (145.1 overs); Connor Williams 153 (329); Lalith Mohan 4/132 (39.1 overs)	Rajiv Gandhi International Stadium, Hyderabad; Umpires: Sudhir Asnani and MSS Ranawat
Scorecard	272/4 (94.4 overs); Arjun Yadav 101* (207); Irfan Pathan 2/67 (26 overs)			Rajiv Gandhi International Stadium, Hyderabad; Umpires: Sudhir Asnani and MSS Ranawat
Hyderabad won the toss and elected to bat.; Mohammed Shakeer (Hyderabad) made his first-class debut.

1–4 December 2007	Hyderabad	v	Orissa	Orissa won by 9 wickets
Scorecard	240 (96 overs); Dwaraka Ravi Teja 81 (79); Debashish Mohanty 5/63 (32 overs)		298 (103.3 overs); Niranjan Behera 103 (252); Pragyan Ojha 6/58 (33.3 overs)	Rajiv Gandhi International Stadium, Hyderabad; Umpires: Anil Dandekar
Scorecard	160 (61.4 overs); Anoop Pai 48 (118); Debashish Mohanty 5/25 (16 overs)		103/1 (27.4 overs); Bikas Pati 52 (95)	Rajiv Gandhi International Stadium, Hyderabad; Umpires: Anil Dandekar
Hyderabad won the toss and elected to bat.

9–12 December 2007	Andhra	v	Hyderabad	Hyderabad won by 3 wickets
Scorecard	159 (54.4 overs); Gnaneswara Rao 42 (66); Pragyan Ojha 3/43 (13.4 overs)		132 (78.3 overs); Arjun Yadav 49 (188); Doddapaneni Kalyankrishna 4/42 (25 overs)	Rajiv Gandhi International Stadium, Hyderabad; Umpires: Shashank Ranade and Rajiv Risodkar
Scorecard	127 (47.5 overs); Gnaneswara Rao 61 (118); Mungala Arjun 7/56 (17 overs)		155/7 (67.1 overs); Anoop Pai 53 (111); Doddapaneni Kalyankrishna 3/41 (18.1 overs)	Rajiv Gandhi International Stadium, Hyderabad; Umpires: Shashank Ranade and Rajiv Risodkar
Andhra won the toss and elected to bat.; Danny Dereck Prince (Hyderabad) made his first-class debut.

25–28 December 2007	Uttar Pradesh	v	Hyderabad	Uttar Pradesh won by 132 runs
Scorecard	336 (106.3 overs); Tanmay Srivastava 81 (161); Vishal Sharma 4/73 (24.3 overs)		193 (62.2 overs); Mohammed Shakeer 49 (41); Piyush Chawla 4/50 (19.2 overs)	Rajiv Gandhi International Stadium, Hyderabad; Umpires: Ravi Deshmukh and Mukund Mandale
Scorecard	294/3d (83.4 overs); Mohammad Kaif 100* (150); Pragyan Ojha 2/109 (35.4 overs)		305 (82.2 overs); Dwaraka Ravi Teja 133* (118); Praveen Kumar 6/65 (23 overs)	Rajiv Gandhi International Stadium, Hyderabad; Umpires: Ravi Deshmukh and Mukund Mandale
Uttar Pradesh won the toss and elected to bat.; Vishal Sharma (Hyderabad) made his first-class debut.

=== Statistics ===
Most runs

Player	Mat	Inns	Runs	Ave	SR	HS	100	50
Dwaraka Ravi Teja	6	12	653	59.36	70.44	133*	2	4
Arjun Yadav	6	12	370	33.63	43.73	101*	1	1
Anoop Pai	6	12	366	33.27	40.48	119*	1	2

- Source: ESPNcricinfo

Most wickets

Player	Mat	Inns	Wkts	Ave	Econ	BBI	SR	5WI	10WM
Pragyan Ojha	6	10	24	31.87	2.76	6/58	69.2	1	0
Ashwin Yadav	4	7	13	26.61	3.47	4/75	45.9	0	0
Mungala Arjun	4	7	11	31.18	3.39	7/56	55.0	1	0

- Source: ESPNcricinfo

== Vijay Hazare Trophy ==
The Hyderabad team, led by Arjun Yadav, began their campaign in the Vijay Hazare Trophy, previously known as the Ranji One-Day Trophy, a List-A cricket tournament in India, with a loss against the Kerala at Chennai on 26 February 2008. Sarvesh Kumar's five wicket haul helped the Hyderabad to bowl out Kerala for 237 but the disciplined bowling effort from the Kerala ensured their win by 7 runs despite the half-century from Abhinav Kumar for the Hyderabad. The Hyderabad lost their second match to the Karnataka as Bharat Chipli's century and Vinay Kumar's all-round contribution with both bat and ball ensured a 111 run for the Karnataka. The Hyderabad suffered their third loss in as many games as three-wicket haul from Ravichandran Ashwin and C. Ganapathy helped the Tamil Nadu restrict the Hyderabad for 236 despite Abhinav Kumar's 93 while century from Murali Vijay ensured the Tamil Nadu a two-wicket win. The Hyderabad finally earned their first win in the tournament with a 62-run win over the Goa as Anoop Pai's maiden List-A century along with the half-century from Arjun Yadav helped the Hyderabad post 284 while Dwaraka Ravi Teja and Mohammed Shakeer shared seven wickets between them to bowl out Goa for 222 despite the half-century from Ajay Ratra. A century from Abhinav Kumar and three-wicket haul from Ravi Teja ensured the Hyderabad win over the Andhra by 95 runs though they finished third in the South Zone and failed to qualify for the knockout stage with two wins and three losses.

=== Points Table ===
South Zone

Team	Pld	W	L	T	NR	Pts	NRR
Karnataka	5	5	0	0	0	22	+1.184
Tamil Nadu	5	4	1	0	0	18	+1.009
Hyderabad	5	2	3	0	0	9	+0.133
Goa	5	2	3	0	0	7	-0.167
Andhra	5	1	4	0	0	3	-0.645
Kerala	5	1	4	0	0	1	-1.500

- Top two teams advanced to the knockout stage.

=== Matches ===
Zonal Stage

26 February 2008	Kerala; 237 (49.5 overs)	v	Hyderabad; 230/8 (50 overs)	Kerala won by 7 runs
Scorecard	Kerala; 237 (49.5 overs)	v	Hyderabad; 230/8 (50 overs)	Sri Ramachandra Medical College Ground, Chennai; Umpires: V Mouli and Sadashiv Iyer
Scorecard	Karimuttathu Rakesh 43 (76); Sarvesh Kumar 5/47 (9.5 overs)		Abhinav Kumar 85 (108); Tinu Yohannan 3/29 (10 overs)	Sri Ramachandra Medical College Ground, Chennai; Umpires: V Mouli and Sadashiv Iyer
Kerala won the toss and elected to bat.; Ronald Rodrigues, Ashwin Yadav and Sarvesh Kumar (Hyderabad); Antony Sebastian and Karimuttathu Rakesh (Kerala) all made their List-A debuts.; Points : Kerala 4; Hyderabad 0				Sri Ramachandra Medical College Ground, Chennai; Umpires: V Mouli and Sadashiv Iyer

27 February 2008	Karnataka; 312/8 (50 overs)	v	Hyderabad; 201/6 (50 overs)	Karnataka won by 111 runs
Scorecard	Karnataka; 312/8 (50 overs)	v	Hyderabad; 201/6 (50 overs)	M. A. Chidambaram Stadium, Chennai; Umpires: Sadashiv Iyer and K. N. Ananthapadmanabhan
Scorecard	Bharat Chipli 100 (99); Sarvesh Kumar 3/71 (9 overs)		Abhinav Kumar 50* (107); Vinay Kumar 3/25 (6 overs)	M. A. Chidambaram Stadium, Chennai; Umpires: Sadashiv Iyer and K. N. Ananthapadmanabhan
Karnataka won the toss and elected to bat.; Doddapaneni Rushi Raj (Hyderabad); K. P. Appanna (Karnataka) all made their List-A debuts.; Points : Karnataka 5; Hyderabad -1				M. A. Chidambaram Stadium, Chennai; Umpires: Sadashiv Iyer and K. N. Ananthapadmanabhan

29 February 2008	Hyderabad; 236/6 (50 overs)	v	Tamil Nadu; 237/8 (49 overs)	Tamil Nadu won by 2 wickets
Scorecard	Hyderabad; 236/6 (50 overs)	v	Tamil Nadu; 237/8 (49 overs)	Sri Ramachandra Medical College Ground, Chennai; Umpires: V Mouli and Belur Ravi
Scorecard	Abhinav Kumar 93 (119); Ravichandran Ashwin 3/32 (8 overs)		Murali Vijay 108 (120); Pragyan Ojha 2/41 (10 overs)	Sri Ramachandra Medical College Ground, Chennai; Umpires: V Mouli and Belur Ravi
Hyderabad won the toss and elected to bat.; Points : Tamil Nadu 4; Hyderabad 0				Sri Ramachandra Medical College Ground, Chennai; Umpires: V Mouli and Belur Ravi

1 March 2008	Hyderabad; 284/8 (50 overs)	v	Goa; 222 (47.2 overs)	Hyderabad won by 62 runs
Scorecard	Hyderabad; 284/8 (50 overs)	v	Goa; 222 (47.2 overs)	Central Polytechnic India Pistons Ground, Chennai; Umpires: Ajith Kumar and Puttarangaiah Jayapal
Scorecard	Anoop Pai 102; Saahil Dhuri 2/34 (10 overs)		Swapnil Asnodkar 64; Mohammed Shakeer 4/52 (10 overs)	Central Polytechnic India Pistons Ground, Chennai; Umpires: Ajith Kumar and Puttarangaiah Jayapal
Hyderabad won the toss and elected to bat.; Vishal Sharma (Hyderabad) made his List-A debut.; Points : Hyderabad 5; Goa -1				Central Polytechnic India Pistons Ground, Chennai; Umpires: Ajith Kumar and Puttarangaiah Jayapal

3 March 2008	Hyderabad; 259/8 (50 overs)	v	Andhra; 164 (39.5 overs)	Hyderabad won by 95 runs
Scorecard	Hyderabad; 259/8 (50 overs)	v	Andhra; 164 (39.5 overs)	Central Polytechnic India Pistons Ground, Chennai; Umpires: Nitin Pai and Ajith Kumar
Scorecard	Abhinav Kumar 105 (123); Gnaneswara Rao 3/42 (10 overs)		Shankara Rao 41 (43); Dwaraka Ravi Teja 3/17 (5.5 overs)	Central Polytechnic India Pistons Ground, Chennai; Umpires: Nitin Pai and Ajith Kumar
Hyderabad won the toss and elected to bat.; G V Sarath Babu (Andhra); Paramveer Singh (Hyderabad) all made their List-A debuts.; Points : Hyderabad 5; Andhra -1				Central Polytechnic India Pistons Ground, Chennai; Umpires: Nitin Pai and Ajith Kumar

=== Statistics ===
Most runs

Player	Mat	Inns	Runs	Ave	HS	100	50
Abhinav Kumar	5	5	379	94.75	105	1	3
Anoop Pai	4	4	173	43.25	102	1	0
Amol Shinde	5	5	152	30.40	47	0	0

- Source: ESPNcricinfo

Most wickets

Player	Mat	Inns	Wkts	Ave	Econ	BBI	SR	4WI	5WI
Sarvesh Kumar	5	5	8	22.75	5.90	5/47	23.1	0	1
Dwaraka Ravi Teja	5	5	7	14.57	3.89	3/17	22.4	0	0
Pragyan Ojha	5	5	6	32.66	4.66	2/41	42.0	0	0

- Source: ESPNcricinfo

== See also ==
- Hyderabad cricket team
- Hyderabad Cricket Association
