= List of Deccan Chargers cricketers =

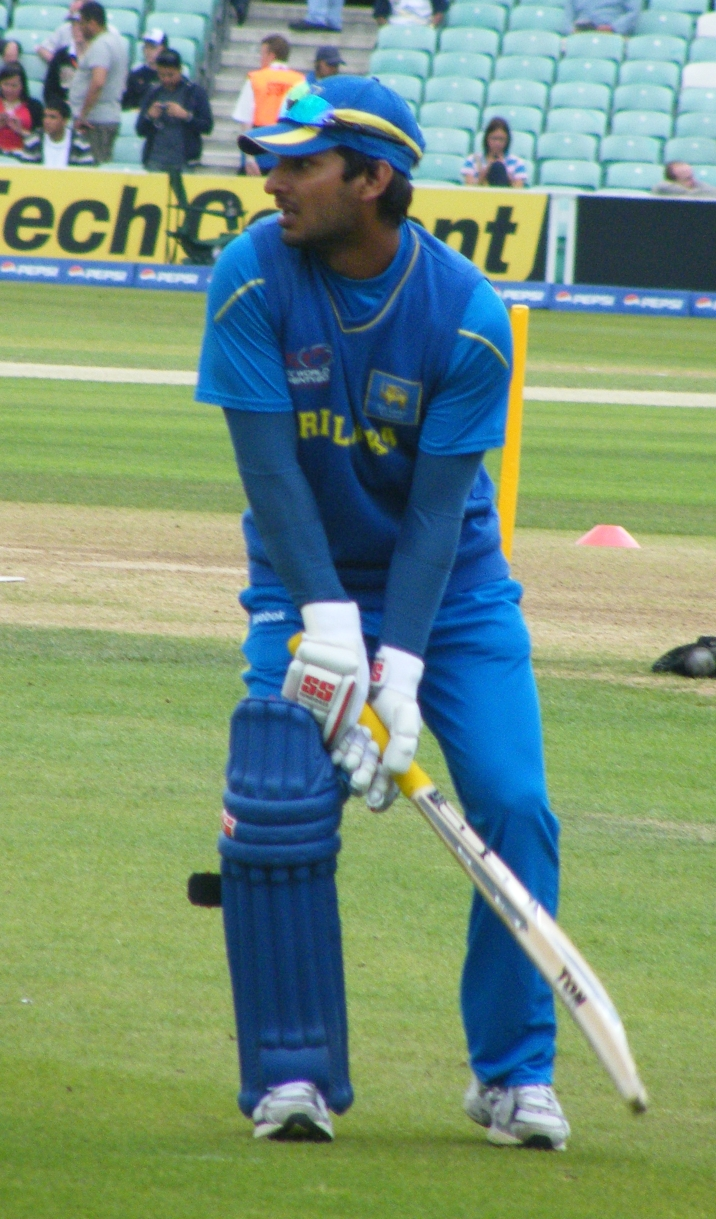
Kumar Sangakkara was the captain of the Deccan Chargers during their last season.

The Hyderabad Deccan Chargers (often abbreviated as DC) was a franchise cricket team based in Hyderabad, Telangana, that competed in the Indian Premier League (IPL) from 2008 to 2012. The team was owned by Deccan Chronicle Holdings Limited who won the bid for the Hyderabad franchise at US$107 million. VVS Laxman and Robin Singh were appointed as the captain and the coach for their first season in 2008. After finishing last in that season, the DC sacked their coach and removed their captain and replaced them with Darren Lehmann and Adam Gilchrist under whom they won their only IPL title in 2009, when they defeated the Royal Challengers Bangalore by six runs in the final. They reached the semi-finals again in 2010 but failed to reach past the group stages before the team was folded in 2012. They qualified for the Champions League Twenty20 only once, for the 2009 season, but failed to advance past the group stage. Lehmann remained as the coach for the DC but they were forced to replace Gilchrist with Kumar Sangakkara in 2011 after they lost former to the Kings XI Punjab in the 2011 auction. Sangakkara remained as the captain until the middle of the 2012 season before he was replaced by Cameron White following the poor performances. Sangakkara later returned as captain as the move did not yield the desired results for the Deccan Chargers.

On 15 September 2012, the Deccan Chargers' IPL contract was terminated by the Board of Control for Cricket in India (BCCI), which was concerned about overdue payments to the players. The Hyderabad franchise was later acquired by the Sun TV Network for ₹85.05 crore (US$8.8 million) per year in a bid which also retained 20 players.

Pragyan Ojha made the most appearances for the DC with 56 matches and was also the team's leading wicket-taker with 62 wickets. Gilchrist was the team's leading run scorer with 1,289 runs while Gilchrist and Rohit Sharma were the only batsmen to have scored more than 1,000 runs for the team. White's batting average of 38.86 was the highest for the DC while Shahid Afridi had the best strike rate at 176.08 among players who have batted in over five innings for the team. Andrew Symonds registered the first century for the DC when he scored 117 runs off 53 balls which was also the highest individual score for any DC batsman. Gilchrist became the only other centurion for the DC when he reached the three-figure mark three days later. In bowling, Dale Steyn had the best bowling average (18.25) among the players who have bowled more than 20 overs. Ishant Sharma was the only bowler to take a five-wicket haul for the DC. Ashish Reddy had the lowest bowling strike rate for the team while Steyn had the best economy rate among the players who bowled over 20 overs at 14.8 and 6.33 respectively. Amit Mishra was the only bowler to claim a hat-trick for the DC. In fielding, Herschelle Gibbs and Rohit Sharma took the most catches for the team (22) while Gilchrist had effected 41 dismissals, the most for a wicket-keeper, consisting of 27 catches and 14 stumpings.

The first list includes all players who played in at least one match for DC and is initially listed alphabetically by their last name. (Note: Sorting as such may actually be considered incorrect, where their last name is used in a different manner to that of western names, but are listed as such for continuity with other lists and ease of understanding the page.) The second list comprises all those players who captained the team in at least one match, initially arranged in the order of the first match as captain. (Note: Many players have also represented other teams of the IPL, but only the records of their games for DC are given.) (Note: To sort these tables by any statistic, click on the icon in the column title.) (Note: These statistics are correct as of 21 October 2012, since then no matches have been played by the DC.) (Note: These statistics do not cover practice matches or matches abandoned without a toss.)

== Players ==
Key

- † – Captain
- ‡ – Wicket-keeper
- First – Year of DC debut
- Last – Year of last match for DC
- * – Batsman remained not out

Deccan Chargers capped cricketers
| General | | | | | | Batting | | | | | | Bowling | | | | Fielding | |
| Name | Nationality (Note: The information in the nationality column is according to Cricinfo. This information may not necessarily reflect the player's birthplace or citizenship.) | First | Last | Mat | Inn | NO | Runs | HS | 100 | 50 | Avg | Overs | Wkt | BBI | Ave | Ca | St |
|---|---|---|---|---|---|---|---|---|---|---|---|---|---|---|---|---|---|
| Shahid Afridi | Pakistan | 2008 | 2008 | 10 | 9 | 1 | 81 | 33 | 0 | 0 | 10.12 | 30.0 | 9 | 3/28 | 25.00 | 4 | – |
| Shoaib Ahmed | India | 2009 | 2009 | 8 | 3 | 1 | 1 | 1* | 0 | 0 | 0.50 | 17.0 | 5 | 2/20 | 30.40 | 4 | – |
| Sanjay Bangar | India | 2008 | 2008 | 11 | 7 | 1 | 47 | 17* | 0 | 0 | 7.83 | 25.0 | 4 | 2/34 | 54.75 | 2 | – |
| Azhar Bilakhia | India | 2009 | 2010 | 7 | 7 | 2 | 69 | 22 | 0 | 0 | 13.80 | – | – | – | – | 1 | – |
| Sumanth Bodapati | India | 2010 | 2010 | 5 | 4 | 3 | 35 | 16 | 0 | 0 | 35.00 | – | – | – | – | 4 | – |
| Bharat Chipli | India | 2011 | 2012 | 19 | 17 | 6 | 244 | 61* | 0 | 1 | 22.18 | 1.0 | 0 | – | – | 2 | – |
| Dan Christian | Australia | 2011 | 2012 | 21 | 20 | 4 | 335 | 39 | 0 | 0 | 20.93 | 72.4 | 19 | 2/13 | 30.68 | 13 | – |
| Halhadar Das | India | 2008 | 2008 | 1 | 1 | 0 | 2 | 2 | 0 | 0 | 2.00 | – | – | – | – | 0 | – |
| Kedar Devdhar ‡ | India | 2011 | 2011 | 1 | – | – | – | – | – | – | – | – | – | – | – | 0 | 1 |
| Shikhar Dhawan | India | 2011 | 2012 | 29 | 29 | 3 | 969 | 95* | 0 | 7 | 37.26 | 8.0 | 4 | 1/7 | 16.50 | 11 | – |
| Kalyankrishna Doddapaneni | India | 2008 | 2008 | 3 | 1 | 0 | 3 | 3 | 0 | 0 | 3.00 | 8.0 | 2 | 1/30 | 43.50 | 1 | – |
| JP Duminy | South Africa | 2011 | 2012 | 19 | 19 | 6 | 449 | 74 | 0 | 3 | 34.53 | 30.0 | 5 | 1/3 | 49.40 | 8 | – |
| Ravi Teja Dwaraka | India | 2008 | 2012 | 30 | 23 | 5 | 361 | 60 | 0 | 1 | 20.05 | 3.0 | 1 | 1/19 | 28.00 | 11 | – |
| Fidel Edwards | West Indies | 2009 | 2009 | 8 | 4 | 2 | 12 | 8* | 0 | 0 | 6.00 | 29.2 | 8 | 3/32 | 26.12 | 0 | – |
| Herschelle Gibbs | South Africa | 2008 | 2010 | 33 | 33 | 3 | 805 | 69* | 0 | 0 | 26.83 | – | – | – | – | 22 | – |
| Adam Gilchrist †‡ | Australia | 2008 | 2010 | 48 | 48 | 1 | 1289 | 109* | 1 | 8 | 27.42 | – | – | – | – | 27 | 14 |
| Manpreet Gony | India | 2011 | 2012 | 9 | 3 | 1 | 4 | 4 | 0 | 0 | 2.00 | 33.0 | 7 | 3/31 | 41.47 | 1 | – |
| Daniel Harris | Australia | 2012 | 2012 | 4 | 4 | 0 | 111 | 47 | 0 | 0 | 27.75 | 3.0 | 0 | – | – | 2 | – |
| Ryan Harris | Australia | 2009 | 2010 | 16 | 10 | 5 | 66 | 15 | 0 | 0 | 13.20 | 61.4 | 20 | 3/18 | 23.15 | 10 | – |
| Ishank Jaggi | India | 2011 | 2012 | 5 | 5 | 1 | 43 | 25 | 0 | 0 | 10.75 | – | – | – | – | 2 | – |
| Abhishek Jhunjhunwala | India | 2012 | 2012 | 5 | 3 | 1 | 24 | 19 | 0 | 0 | 12.00 | 6.0 | 1 | 1/13 | 38.00 | 2 | – |
| Abhinav Kumar | India | 2009 | 2010 | 1 | 1 | 0 | 1 | 1 | 0 | 0 | 1.00 | – | – | – | – | 0 | – |
| Vijay Kumar | India | 2008 | 2008 | 9 | – | – | – | – | – | – | – | 25.2 | 4 | 1/17 | 49.75 | 0 | – |
| Chris Lynn | Australia | 2012 | 2012 | 1 | 1 | 0 | 6 | 6 | 0 | 0 | 6.00 | – | – | – | – | 1 | – |
| Mitchell Marsh | Australia | 2010 | 2010 | 3 | 2 | 0 | 28 | 15 | 0 | 0 | 14.00 | 10.0 | 2 | 1/19 | 44.00 | 0 | – |
| Amit Mishra | India | 2011 | 2012 | 28 | 14 | 7 | 84 | 25* | 0 | 0 | 12.00 | 100.2 | 32 | 4/9 | 22.96 | 3 | – |
| Mohnish Mishra | India | 2010 | 2010 | 11 | 11 | 0 | 166 | 41 | 0 | 0 | 15.09 | – | – | – | – | 1 | – |
| Pragyan Ojha | India | 2008 | 2011 | 56 | 16 | 7 | 7 | 2 | 0 | 0 | 0.77 | 194.1 | 62 | 3/21 | 22.19 | 11 | – |
| Parthiv Patel ‡ | India | 2012 | 2012 | 14 | 13 | 2 | 194 | 45 | 0 | 0 | 17.63 | – | – | – | – | 5 | 1 |
| Anand Rajan | India | 2011 | 2012 | 6 | – | – | – | – | – | – | – | 16.5 | 6 | 3/27 | 26.50 | 0 | – |
| Akshath Reddy | India | 2012 | 2012 | 5 | 4 | 1 | 73 | 42 | 0 | 0 | 24.33 | – | – | – | – | 0 | – |
| Ashish Reddy | India | 2012 | 2012 | 9 | 5 | 1 | 35 | 10* | 0 | 0 | 8.75 | 27.1 | 11 | 3/25 | 7.77 | 0 | – |
| Kemar Roach | West Indies | 2010 | 2010 | 2 | 1 | 0 | 10 | 10 | 0 | 0 | 10.00 | 8.0 | 0 | – | – | 1 | – |
| Kumar Sangakkara †‡ | Sri Lanka | 2011 | 2012 | 25 | 25 | 1 | 558 | 82 | 0 | 2 | 23.25 | – | – | – | – | 17 | 2 |
| Ankit Sharma | India | 2012 | 2012 | 9 | 4 | 1 | 18 | 15 | 0 | 0 | 6.00 | 24.1 | 4 | 1/9 | 41.25 | 0 | – |
| Ishant Sharma | India | 2011 | 2011 | 12 | – | – | – | – | – | – | – | 44.0 | 11 | 5/12 | 28.54 | 3 | – |
| Rahul Sharma | India | 2010 | 2010 | 6 | 4 | 1 | 29 | 14* | 0 | 0 | 9.66 | 20.4 | 5 | 2/42 | 33.40 | 1 | – |
| Rohit Sharma | India | 2008 | 2010 | 47 | 46 | 6 | 1219 | 76* | 0 | 8 | 30.47 | 48.0 | 14 | 4/6 | 25.14 | 22 | – |
| Chamara Silva | Sri Lanka | 2008 | 2008 | 3 | 3 | 1 | 43 | 23* | 0 | 0 | 20.00 | 1.0 | 0 | – | – | 3 | – |
| Anirudh Singh | India | 2009 | 2010 | 5 | 4 | 0 | 63 | 40 | 0 | 0 | 15.75 | – | – | – | – | 3 | – |
| Harmeet Singh | India | 2009 | 2011 | 18 | – | – | – | – | – | – | – | 54.5 | 14 | 2/23 | 30.85 | 4 | – |
| Jaskaran Singh | India | 2009 | 2010 | 8 | 5 | 4 | 8 | 4* | 0 | 0 | 8.00 | 17.0 | 6 | 2/18 | 28.50 | 0 | – |
| R. P. Singh | India | 2008 | 2010 | 44 | 22 | 10 | 51 | 10 | 0 | 0 | 4.25 | 161.0 | 54 | 4/22 | 23.59 | 17 | – |
| Dwayne Smith | West Indies | 2009 | 2010 | 11 | 11 | 1 | 237 | 49 | 0 | 0 | 23.70 | 17.5 | 2 | 1/22 | 80.00 | 6 | – |
| Sunny Sohal | India | 2011 | 2011 | 11 | 10 | 0 | 249 | 62 | 0 | 2 | 24.90 | – | – | – | – | 0 | – |
| Dale Steyn | South Africa | 2011 | 2012 | 24 | 11 | 2 | 55 | 13 | 0 | 0 | 6.11 | 92.1 | 32 | 3/8 | 18.50 | 5 | – |
| Scott Styris | New Zealand | 2008 | 2009 | 12 | 11 | 2 | 153 | 36* | 0 | 0 | 17.00 | – | – | – | – | 3 | – |
| Andrew Symonds | Australia | 2008 | 2010 | 30 | 29 | 4 | 849 | 117* | 1 | 5 | 33.96 | – | – | – | – | 17 | – |
| Suman Tirumalasetti | India | 2009 | 2010 | 28 | 28 | 8 | 559 | 78* | 0 | 2 | 27.95 | 22.0 | 8 | 2/14 | 21.37 | 6 | – |
| Chaminda Vaas | Sri Lanka | 2008 | 2010 | 13 | 11 | 3 | 81 | 20 | 0 | 0 | 10.12 | 47.0 | 18 | 3/21 | 19.72 | 0 | – |
| VVS Laxman † | India | 2008 | 2010 | 19 | 19 | 2 | 228 | 52 | 0 | 1 | 16.94 | – | – | – | – | 4 | – |
| Cameron White † | Australia | 2011 | 2012 | 19 | 19 | 4 | 583 | 78 | 0 | 5 | 38.86 | – | – | – | – | 5 | – |
| Arjun Yadav | India | 2008 | 2008 | 8 | 6 | 1 | 49 | 16 | 0 | 0 | 9.80 | – | – | – | – | 1 | – |
| Venugopal Rao | India | 2008 | 2010 | 35 | 30 | 5 | 498 | 71* | 0 | 2 | 19.92 | – | – | – | – | 8 | – |
| Nuwan Zoysa | Sri Lanka | 2008 | 2008 | 3 | 2 | 1 | 11 | 10* | 0 | 0 | 11.00 | – | – | – | – | 1 | – |

== Captains ==
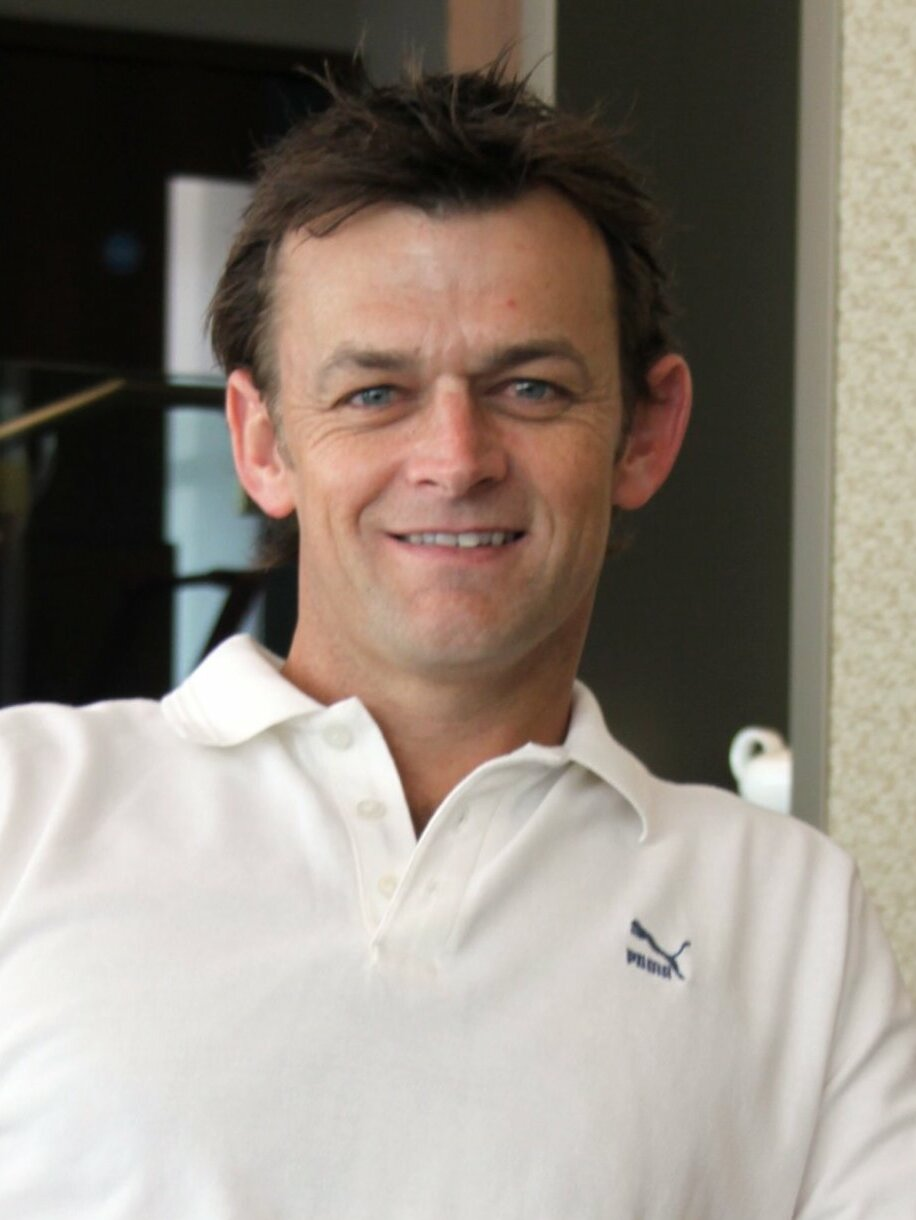
Adam Gilchrist won the 2009 Indian Premier League as the captain for the Deccan Chargers.

Deccan Chargers captains
| No. | Name | First | Last | Mat | Won | Lost | NR | Win% |
|---|---|---|---|---|---|---|---|---|
| 1 | VVS Laxman † | 2008 | 2008 | 6 | 1 | 5 | 0 | 16.6 |
| 2 | Adam Gilchrist †‡ | 2008 | 2010 | 42 | 18 | 24 | 0 | 42.85 |
| 3 | Kumar Sangakkara †‡ | 2011 | 2012 | 25 | 8 | 17 | 0 | 32.00 |
| 4 | Cameron White † | 2011 | 2012 | 4 | 2 | 2 | 0 | 50.00 |
| Total | | | | 77 | 29 | 47 | 1 | 37.66 |

== See also ==
- List of Indian Premier League centuries
- List of Indian Premier League records and statistics
