= Doddapaneni =

Doddapaneni (Telugu: దొడ్డపనేని) is a Telugu surname. Notable people with the surname include:

- Doddapaneni Kalyankrishna (born 1983), Indian cricketer
- Doddapaneni Rushi Raj (born 1986), Indian cricketer
