= Central Polytechnic Chennai =

College in Tamil Nadu, India

Central Polytechnic College
- Former names: Kamarajar
- Type: Government (Autonomous)
- Established: 1916
- Academic affiliations: AICTE, BOTE
- Principal: Thiru.O.G.Dharanipathi
- Location: Tharamani, Chennai, Tamil Nadu, India; 13.000°N 80.247°E
- Campus: CIT CAMPUS
- Website: cptchennai.ac.in

Central Polytechnic Chennai is a polytechnic in Tamil Nadu.

== History ==
The institution was started in 1916 under the name and style of the “Madras Trades School” for imparting training to apprentices in mechanical engineering and plumbing, with an intake of 20 trainees in each course. Gradually, the numbers of courses conducted were increased and also correspondingly admission capacity rose. In 1931, the name of the school was changed to “The Government School of Technology” and courses in mechanical and electrical engineering were recognized and made full time courses leading to the award of a diploma. In the year 1946, the name of the Institution was changed to “The Central Polytechnic College”. In the beginning, the Madras Trade school was functioning in a rented building and in the course of time, a separate building was constructed and the institution moved to its own building at Broadway, where it stayed through the academic year 1957-1958. During 1958-1959 the institution moved to Guindy near the industrial estate. Since the land available in Guindy was not sufficient to construct additional buildings, and to create additional infrastructure for further development, lands to the extent of 40 hectares initially and further 3221 hectares were acquired in the present premises where the Polytechnic is functioning presently. Central Polytechnic College was selected on the basis of merit for the implementation of TEQIP and this Institution is functioning under a block grant system with effect since 1 October 2008.

== Departments ==
- Civil engineering - 3 years
- Computer Engineering - 3 years
- Mechanical engineering - 3 years
- Marine Engineering - 3 years
- Electrical and electronics engineering - 3 years
- Electronics and communications engineering - 3 years
- Mechanical engineering (Sandwich) - 3 1/2 years
- Fisherish technology - 3 1/2 years
- Marine engineering - 3 years

== Canada India Institutional Cooperation Project ==
The Canada India Institutional Cooperation Project is a major Human Resource Development Project launched during the year 1991 through a Memorandum of Understanding signed between the Govt. of Canada and the Govt. of India. The main objective of the Project is to train the staff of the Polytechnic Colleges to improve the quality and enhance the quantum of the human resource potential and to achieve development in Polytechnic Education System.

The project was initially funded by the Canadian International Development Agency and initiatives formulated and executed jointly by the Association of Canadian Community Colleges and the Ministry of Human Resource Development, Govt. of India. When the project came to an end on 31 March 1999, the State Project Coordination Unit was formed to take steps to achieve holistic development in Polytechnic Education System.

At present, 105 polytechnic colleges are participating in this program. Various job-oriented, need-based training programs are offered by the Canada India Institutional Cooperation Project Polytechnic Colleges under Continuing Education Programs. It now offers short-term courses in:

- Auto CAD-2D
- CNC Machines
- Programmable logic controllers
- Supervisory control and data acquisition
- MS Office 2010
- Statistical Quality Control / Statistical Process Control
- Total Quality Management and ISO 9000
- Basic Principle of Town Planning
- Four-wheeler Driving Practice
- Embedded System – 1
- Embedded System – 2
- Refrigeration and Air Condition
- TAHDCO (HUDCO)
- Hardware and networking
- Cell phone and service

The revenue generated through the various programmes of CIICP is to be utilized for Institution development.
