= West Indian cricket team in India in 2011–12 =

International cricket tour

	India	West Indies
- Dates: 6 November – 11 December 2011
Captains	MS Dhoni (Test); Virender Sehwag (Note: Gautam Gambhir captained India in the fifth ODIs.) (ODI)	Darren Sammy

Test series
- Result: India won the 3-match series 2–0
Most runs	Rahul Dravid (319)	Darren Bravo (404)
Most wickets	Ravichandran Ashwin (22)	Darren Sammy (9)
- Player of the series: Ravichandran Ashwin (Ind)

One Day International series
- Results: India won the 5-match series 4–1
Most runs	Rohit Sharma (305)	Kieron Pollard (199)
Most wickets	Ravindra Jadeja (9)	Kemar Roach (9)
- Player of the series: Rohit Sharma (Ind)

The West Indies cricket team toured India from 6 November to 11 December 2011. The tour consisted of three Test matches and five One Day Internationals (ODIs). On day three of the First Test, Indian batsman Sachin Tendulkar became the first cricketer to pass 15,000 runs in Test cricket.

== Squads ==
Tests		ODI Squads	
India	West Indies	India	West Indies
Mahendra Singh Dhoni (c & wk); Varun Aaron; Ravichandran Ashwin; Rahul Dravid; Gautam Gambhir; Virat Kohli; VVS Laxman; Pragyan Ojha; Ajinkya Rahane; Virender Sehwag; Ishant Sharma; Rahul Sharma; Sachin Tendulkar; Umesh Yadav; Yuvraj Singh; Rohit Sharma	Darren Sammy (c); Adrian Barath; Carlton Baugh (wk); Devendra Bishoo; Kraigg Brathwaite; Darren Bravo; Shivnarine Chanderpaul; Fidel Edwards; Kirk Edwards; Kieran Powell; Denesh Ramdin (wk); Ravi Rampaul; Kemar Roach; Marlon Samuels; Shane Shillingford	Virender Sehwag (c); Varun Aaron; Ravichandran Ashwin; Manoj Tiwary; Gautam Gambhir; Virat Kohli; Suresh Raina; Ravindra Jadeja; Ajinkya Rahane; Vinay Kumar; Parthiv Patel (wk); Rahul Sharma; Rohit Sharma; Umesh Yadav; Praveen Kumar; Abhimanyu Mithun; Irfan Pathan	Darren Sammy (c); Adrian Barath; Sunil Narine; Anthony Martin; Lendl Simmons; Darren Bravo; Danza Hyatt; Andre Russell; Kieron Pollard; Kieran Powell; Denesh Ramdin (wk); Ravi Rampaul; Kemar Roach; Marlon Samuels; Jason Mohammed

== Test series ==
=== 1st Test ===
6–10 November 2011
Scorecard

West Indies	v	India
304 (108.2 overs); Shivnarine Chanderpaul 118 (196); Pragyan Ojha 6/72 (34.2 overs)		209 (52.5 overs); Virender Sehwag 55 (46); Darren Sammy 3/55 (8 overs)
180 (57.3 overs); Shivnarine Chanderpaul 47 (58); Ravichandran Ashwin 6/47 (21.3 overs)		276/5 (80.4 overs); Sachin Tendulkar 76 (148); Darren Sammy 2/56 (16 overs)

India won by 5 wickets
Feroz Shah Kotla, Delhi
Umpires: Kumar Dharmasena (SL) and Rod Tucker (Aus)
Player of the match: Ravichandran Ashwin (Ind)

- West Indies won the toss and elected to bat.
- Sachin Tendulkar became the first cricketer to score 15,000 Test runs.
- Ravichandran Ashwin and Umesh Yadav (both Ind) made their Test debuts.

=== 2nd Test ===
14–18 November 2011
Scorecard

India	v	West Indies
631/7d (151.2 overs); VVS Laxman 176* (280); Kemar Roach 2/106 (26 overs)		153 (48 overs); Darren Bravo 30 (56); Pragyan Ojha 4/64 (22 overs)
		463 (f/o) (126.3 overs); Darren Bravo 136 (230); Umesh Yadav 4/80 (17.3 overs)

India won by an innings and 15 runs
Eden Gardens, Kolkata
Umpires: Bruce Oxenford (Aus) and Rod Tucker (Aus)
Player of the match: VVS Laxman (Ind)

- India won the toss and elected to bat.
- India got their second largest lead of 478 in Test cricket.

=== 3rd Test ===
22–26 November 2011
Scorecard

West Indies	v	India
590 (184.1 overs); Darren Bravo 166 (284); Ravichandran Ashwin 5/156 (52.1 overs)		482 (135.4 overs); Ravichandran Ashwin 103 (118); Marlon Samuels 3/74 (17 overs)
134 (57.2 overs); Darren Bravo 48 (105); Pragyan Ojha 6/47 (27 overs)		242/9 (64 overs); Virat Kohli 63 (114); Ravi Rampaul 3/56 (16 overs)

Match drawn
Wankhede Stadium, Mumbai
Umpires: Tony Hill (NZ) and Bruce Oxenford (Aus)
Player of the match: Ravichandran Ashwin (Ind)

- West Indies won the toss and elected to bat.
- Varun Aaron (Ind) made his Test debut.
- Rahul Dravid became the second cricketer to score 13,000 Test runs.
- Ravichandran Ashwin became the third Indian to score a century and take a five-wicket haul in the same Test.
- This was the second Test match ever to be drawn with scores level.

== ODI series ==
=== 1st ODI ===
29 November 2011
14:30 (D/N)
Scorecard

West Indies; 211/9 (50 overs)	v	India; 213/9 (48.5 overs)
Darren Bravo 60 (74); Umesh Yadav 2/33 (8 overs)		Rohit Sharma 72 (99); Kemar Roach 3/46 (10 overs)

India won by 1 wicket
Barabati Stadium, Cuttack
Umpires: Tony Hill (NZ) and Shavir Tarapore (Ind)
Player of the match: Rohit Sharma (Ind)

- India won the toss and elected to field.

=== 2nd ODI ===
2 December 2011
14:30 (D/N)
Scorecard

West Indies; 269 (50 overs)	v	India; 270/5 (48.1 overs)
Ravi Rampaul 86* (66); Umesh Yadav 3/38 (10 overs)		Virat Kohli 117 (123); Kemar Roach 2/40 (10 overs)

India won by 5 wickets
Dr. Y. S. Rajasekhara Reddy ACA–VDCA Cricket Stadium, Visakhapatnam
Umpires: Tony Hill (NZ) and Sundaram Ravi (Ind)
Player of the match: Virat Kohli (Ind)

- India won the toss and elected to field.

=== 3rd ODI ===
5 December 2011
14:30 (D/N)
Scorecard

West Indies; 260/5 (50 overs)	v	India; 244 (46.5 overs)
Marlon Samuels 58 (93); Vinay Kumar 2/39 (10 overs)		Rohit Sharma 95 (100); Ravi Rampaul 4/57 (8.5 overs)

West Indies won by 16 runs
Sardar Patel Stadium, Ahmedabad
Umpires: Sudhir Asnani (Ind) and Tony Hill (NZ)
Player of the match: Ravi Rampaul (WI)

- India won the toss and elected to field.
- Sunil Narine (WI) made his ODI debut.

=== 4th ODI ===
8 December 2011
14:30 (D/N)
Scorecard

India; 418/5 (50 overs)	v	West Indies; 265 (49.2 overs)
Virender Sehwag 219 (149); Andre Russell 1/63 (7 overs)		Denesh Ramdin 96 (96); Ravindra Jadeja 3/34 (10 overs)

India won by 153 runs
Holkar Cricket Stadium, Indore
Umpires: Tony Hill (NZ) and Sundaram Ravi (Ind)
Player of the match: Virender Sehwag (Ind)

- India won the toss and elected to bat.
- Rahul Sharma (Ind) made his ODI debut.
- Virender Sehwag's score of 219 broke the previous record for the highest individual ODI score by Sachin Tendulkar. It was the second double-century by a batsman in ODI cricket. The innings consisted of 25 fours and 7 sixes, hitting 65% of his runs with boundaries.
- India registered their highest ever total in ODIs.

=== 5th ODI ===
11 December 2011
14:30 (D/N)
Scorecard

India; 267/6 (50 overs)	v	West Indies; 233 (44.1 overs)
Manoj Tiwary 104 (r/h) (126); Kemar Roach 2/46 (8 overs)		Kieron Pollard 119 (110); Ravindra Jadeja 3/62 (10 overs)

India won by 34 runs
MA Chidambaram Stadium, Chennai
Umpires: Sudhir Asnani (Ind) and Tony Hill (NZ)
Player of the match: Manoj Tiwary (Ind)

- India won the toss and elected to bat.
- Gautam Gambhir was the stand in captain for this match in absence of Virender Sehwag.
- Jason Mohammed (WI) made his ODI debut.
