= Bureau of Technical Education =

Indian government organization

The Bureau of Technical Education is one of several bureaus under the Department of Higher Education of the Ministry of Human Resource Development, Union Government. It is a department of each state government in India. It is responsible for technical education in each respective state. The bureau imparts and regulates technical education. Generally, the bureau runs technical institutes like polytechnic and engineering colleges. The bureau's duties include curriculum revision, selection of teachers, admission of students, and infrastructure upgrades.

== See also ==
- Department of Higher Education (India)
- Department of Technical Education
- University Grants Commission (India)
