= Sher Yadav =

Indian cricketer (born 1984)

Personal information
- Full name: Sher Bahadur Yadav
- Born: 4 December 1984 (age 41); Vasco da Gama, Goa, India
- Source: ESPNcricinfo, 30 January 2017

Sher Yadav (born 4 December 1984) is an Indian cricketer. He made his first-class debut for Goa in the 2004–05 Ranji Trophy on 4 December 2004.
