= Naveen Reddy =

Indian cricketer (born 1984)

Personal information
- Born: 9 May 1984 (age 42); Hyderabad, India

Domestic team information
- Years: Team
- 2007: Hyderabad

Career statistics
| Competition | FC |
|---|---|
| Matches | 2 |
| Runs scored | 15 |
| Batting average | 7.50 |
| 100s/50s | 0/0 |
| Top score | 14 |
| Catches/stumpings | 0/0 |
- Source: ESPNcricinfo, 22 August 2018

Naveen Reddy (born 9 May 1984) is an Indian former cricketer. He played two List A matches for Hyderabad in 2007.

== See also ==
- List of Hyderabad cricketers
