= Ronald Rodrigues =

Indian cricketer (born 1986)

Personal information
- Full name: Ronald Roy Rodrigues
- Born: 28 August 1986 (age 40); Hyderabad, India

Domestic team information
- Years: Team
- 2008-2009: Hyderabad

Career statistics
Competition	LA
Matches	6
Runs scored	93
Batting average	15.50
100s/50s	0/0
Top score	40
Catches/stumpings	4/0
- Source: ESPNcricinfo, 22 August 2018

Ronald Rodrigues (born 28 August 1986) is an Indian former cricketer. He played six List A matches for Hyderabad between 2008 and 2009.

== See also ==
- List of Hyderabad cricketers
