= Sarvesh Kumar =

Indian cricketer (born 1989)

Personal information
- Full name: PM Sarvesh Kumar
- Born: 26 April 1989 (age 37); Hyderabad, India
- Batting: Right handed
- Bowling: Right arm medium

Domestic team information
- Years: Team
- 2007/08-2009/10: Hyderabad
- 2008: Deccan Chargers

Career statistics
Competition	FC	LA	T20
Matches	2	7	2
Runs scored	19	9	1
Batting average	19.00	-	-
100s/50s	0/0	0/0	0/0
Top score	14*	7*	1*
Balls bowled	433	287	30
Wickets	2	10	1
Bowling average	132.50	25.30	42.00
5 wickets in innings	0	1	0
10 wickets in match	0	0	0
Best bowling	1/62	5/47	1/18
Catches/stumpings	2/0	1/0	0/0
- Source: ESPNcricinfo, 22 August 2018

Sarvesh Kumar (born 26 April 1989) is an Indian former cricketer. He played two first-class matches for Hyderabad in 2009.

== See also ==
- List of Hyderabad cricketers
