= Hindustan Zinc Limited Ground =

Cricket ground in Visakhapatnam, India

- Interactive map of Hindustan Zinc Limited Ground
- Full name: Hindustan Zinc Limited Ground
- Location: Visakhapatnam, Andhra Pradesh
- Coordinates: 17.69130°N 83.21989°E
- Owner: Hindustan Zinc Limited
- Operator: Hindustan Zinc Limited
- Capacity: n/a

Construction
- Groundbreaking: 2002
- Opened: 2002

Website
- ESPNcricinfo

Hindustan Zinc Limited Ground is a cricket ground in Visakhapatnam, Andhra Pradesh. It is owned by Hindustan Zinc Limited and was established in 2002. In 2007, the hosted five Inter-State T20 Championship matches since then it has been specialist ground for Twenty20 cricket. In 2009, the hosted four Syed Mushtaq Ali Trophy matches since the ground was not being used for top level cricket. The ground is a regular host for under-age cricket in the state.
