= Seetharam Prabhu =

Indian cricket umpire (born 1964)

Personal information
- Born: 25 August 1964 (age 62)

Umpiring information

NR Seetharam Prabhu (born 25 August 1964) is an Indian cricket umpire. He has officiated 28 First-class matches and 18 List A matches. He made his debut as an umpire in major domestic cricket on 12 November 1999 in a one-day match between Haryana and Himachal Pradesh.
