= Santosh Yadav (Indian cricketer) =

Indian cricketer (born 1979)

Personal information
- Full name: Balram Santosh Kumar Yadav
- Born: 17 October 1979 (age 47); Hyderabad, India

Domestic team information
- Years: Team
- 1995-2007: Hyderabad

Career statistics
Competition	FC	LA	T20
Matches	10	2	3
Runs scored	353	16	30
Batting average	25.21	8.00	15.00
100s/50s	0/4	0/0	0/0
Top score	70	16	16
Balls bowled	299	42	46
Wickets	6	2	5
Bowling average	32.50	17.50	9.00
5 wickets in innings	0	0	0
10 wickets in match	0	0	0
Best bowling	2/13	2/35	3/10
Catches/stumpings	2/0	0/0	2/0
- Source: ESPNcricinfo, 22 August 2018

Santosh Yadav (born 17 October 1979) is an Indian former cricketer. He played ten first-class matches for Hyderabad between 1995 and 2007.

== See also ==
- List of Hyderabad cricketers
