= Rohit Sabharwal =

Indian cricketer (born 1978)

Personal information
- Full name: Rohit Kumar Sabharwal
- Born: 8 January 1978 (age 48); Kanpur, Uttar Pradesh, India
- Batting: Right-handed
- Role: Wicket-keeper-batter

Domestic team information
- Years: Team
- 2001/02–2006/07: Hyderabad

Career statistics
Competition	FC	LA	T20
Matches	3	5	1
Runs scored	16	50	1
Batting average	4.00	12.50	1.00
100s/50s	0/0	0/0	0/0
Top score	15	28	1
Catches/stumpings	8/0	2/3	0/0
- Source: ESPNcricinfo, 22 August 2018

Rohit Sabharwal (born 8 January 1978) is a former Indian cricketer who represented Hyderabad in domestic cricket. He made his debut for Hyderabad in the 2001–02 season.

== See also ==
- List of Hyderabad cricketers
