= Arun Sharma (Services cricketer) =

Indian cricketer (born 1973)

Personal information
- Full name: Arun Sharma
- Born: 17 September 1973 (age 52); Jammu, India
- Batting: Left-handed
- Bowling: Slow left-arm orthodox
- Role: Bowler

Domestic team information
- Years: Team
- 1993/94–1994/95: Jammu & Kashmir
- 1995/96–2008/09: Services
- Source: ESPNcricinfo, 17 April, 2016

Arun Sharma (born 17 September 1973) is an Indian first-class cricketer who played for Services and Jammu & Kashmir. He coached at Sehwag Cricket Academy in Jammu.
