= Pagadala Niranjan =

Indian cricketer (born 1984)

Personal information
- Born: 16 December 1984 (age 41); Hyderabad, India

Domestic team information
- Years: Team
- 2005-2010: Hyderabad

Career statistics
Competition	FC	LA	T20
Matches	3	7	3
Runs scored	79	68	11
Batting average	13.16	11.33	11.00
100s/50s	0/0	0/0	0/0
Top score	41	31	11
Balls bowled	107	147	18
Wickets	4	4	2
Bowling average	17.75	33.25	10.50
5 wickets in innings	0	0	0
10 wickets in match	0	0	0
Best bowling	2/4	2/8	1/10
Catches/stumpings	0/0	2/0	0/0
- Source: ESPNcricinfo, 22 August 2018

Pagadala Niranjan (born 16 December 1984) is an Indian former cricketer. He played three first-class matches for Hyderabad between 2005 and 2006.

== See also ==
- List of Hyderabad cricketers
