= Ashwin Yadav =

Indian cricketer (1987–2021)

Personal information
- Born: 10 September 1987; Hyderabad, India
- Died: 24 April 2021 (aged 33)

Domestic team information
- Years: Team
- 2007-2010: Hyderabad

Career statistics
Competition	FC	LA	T20
Matches	14	10	2
Runs scored	120	17	-
Batting average	9.23	8.50	-
100s/50s	0/0	0/0	-/-
Top score	28*	7*	-
Balls bowled	2,013	360	30
Wickets	34	4	3
Bowling average	32.70	91.50	11.33
5 wickets in innings	1	0	0
10 wickets in match	0	0	0
Best bowling	6/52	2/50	2/20
Catches/stumpings	2/0	3/0	0/0
- Source: ESPNcricinfo, 20 July 2018

Ashwin Yadav (10 September 1987 – 24 April 2021) was an Indian cricketer. He played fourteen first-class matches for Hyderabad between 2007 and 2009.

Yadav died of heart attack on 24 April 2021, at the age of 33.

== See also ==
- List of Hyderabad cricketers
