= T. R. Kashyappan =

Indian cricket umpire (born 1955)

Personal information
- Born: 3 August 1955 (age 71)

Umpiring information
- ODIs umpired: 1 (2000)
- WODIs umpired: 1 (1997)
- Source: Cricinfo, 20 May 2014

T. R. Kashyappan (born 3 August 1955) is a former Indian cricket umpire. At the international level, he only stood in one fixture, a One Day International, in 2000.

== See also ==
- List of One Day International cricket umpires
