= Alfred Absolem =

Indian cricketer (born 1986)

Personal information
- Born: 23 January 1986 (age 40); Hyderabad, India

Domestic team information
- Years: Team
- 2005-2014: Hyderabad

Career statistics
Competition	FC	LA	T20
Matches	22	17	9
Runs scored	274	137	12
Batting average	10.53	15.22	6.00
100s/50s	0/0	0/0	0/0
Top score	29	27*	6
Balls bowled	4,293	892	171
Wickets	83	26	7
Bowling average	26.95	28.11	27.28
5 wickets in innings	5	0	0
10 wickets in match	1	0	0
Best bowling	7/35	3/30	3/8
Catches/stumpings	6/0	4/0	5/0
- Source: ESPNcricinfo, 21 June 2018

Alfred Absolem (born 23 January 1986) is an Indian first-class cricketer who plays for Hyderabad.
