= Ravi Subramanian (umpire) =

Indian cricket umpire (1965–2017)

Personal information
- Full name: Ravi Subramanian
- Born: 6 August 1965; Bangalore, India
- Died: 4 June 2017 (aged 51)
- Nickname: Subbu

Umpiring information
- WT20Is umpired: 5 (2012–2016)
- FC umpired: 81 (1997–2016)
- LA umpired: 40 (1998–2014)
- T20 umpired: 33 (2007–2016)
- Source: Cricketarchive, 30 December 2016

Ravi Subramanian (6 August 1965 – 4 June 2017) was an Indian cricket umpire. He stood in matches in Women's Twenty20 Internationals, the Ranji Trophy tournament, and other domestic List A and Twenty20 cricket matches.
