= Mohammed Shakeer =

Indian cricketer (born 1986)

Personal information
- Born: 15 November 1986 (age 39); Hyderabad, India

Domestic team information
- Years: Team
- 2007-2008: Hyderabad

Career statistics
Competition	FC	LA
Matches	3	8
Runs scored	96	90
Batting average	19.20	12.85
100s/50s	0/0	0/0
Top score	49	29*
Balls bowled	84	144
Wickets	2	5
Bowling average	17.00	17.20
5 wickets in innings	0	0
10 wickets in match	0	0
Best bowling	1/7	4/52
Catches/stumpings	2/0	3/0
- Source: ESPNcricinfo, 22 August 2018

Mohammed Shakeer (born 15 November 1986) is an Indian former cricketer. He played three first-class matches for Hyderabad between 2007 and 2008.

== See also ==
- List of Hyderabad cricketers
