= Chandrasekar Ganapathy =

Indian cricketer (born 1981)

Personal information
- Full name: Chandrasekar Ganapathy
- Born: 10 June 1981 (age 45); Chennai, Tamil Nadu, India
- Batting: Right-handed
- Bowling: Right-arm medium
- Role: All-rounder

Domestic team information
- Years: Team
- 2010: Chennai Super Kings
- Source: ESPNcricinfo, 8 May 2025

Chandrasekar Ganapathy (born 10 June 1981 in Chennai, Tamil Nadu) is an Indian cricketer. He is a right-arm medium pace bowler and right-handed batsman. He plays for Tamil Nadu in the Ranji Trophy and for South Zone in the Duleep Trophy. Ganapathy was also called up for the India 'A' team in 2010.

He also had an Indian Premier League (IPL) contract with Chennai Super Kings in 2010. He played in one match for Chennai after Arun Karthik was dropped and before Doug Bollinger's arrival, bowling and entering the game as a batsman but not facing a single ball.
