= Anoop Pai =

Indian cricketer (born 1984)

Personal information
- Full name: Srinivas Anoop Pai
- Born: 20 December 1984 (age 41); Addis Ababa, Ethiopia

Domestic team information
- Years: Team
- 2005–2010: Hyderabad

Career statistics
Competition	FC	LA	T20
Matches	20	12	4
Runs scored	1,052	356	92
Batting average	28.43	29.66	23.00
100s/50s	2/8	1/2	0/0
Top score	130	102	31
Balls bowled	36	66	–
Wickets	0	2	–
Bowling average	–	29.50	–
5 wickets in innings	–	0	–
10 wickets in match	–	0	–
Best bowling	–	1/14	–
Catches/stumpings	15/0	4/0	0/0
- Source: ESPNcricinfo, 20 July 2018

Anoop Pai (born 20 December 1984) is an Indian first-class cricketer who played for Hyderabad.
