= Connor Williams (cricketer) =

Indian cricketer (born 1973)

Personal information
- Full name: Connor Cecil Williams
- Born: 7 August 1973 (age 53); Baroda, Gujarat, India
- Batting: Left-handed
- Bowling: Slow left arm orthodox

Career statistics
Competition	First-class	List A
Matches	124	57
Runs scored	7,942	2,087
Batting average	39.90	39.37
100s/50s	19/42	3/14
Top score	237*	114*
Balls bowled	–	30
Wickets	–	1
Bowling average	–	6.00
5 wickets in innings	–	0
10 wickets in match	–	0
Best bowling	–	1/14
Catches/stumpings	97/–	25/–
- Source: ESPNcricinfo

Connor Cecil Williams (born 7 August 1973 in Gujarat) is an Indian first class cricketer, who played for Baroda. He is a left-handed opening batsman.

== Career ==
A left-handed opening batsman, Williams came to the selectors attention after the 2001 Irani Trophy where he scored 143 in the first innings and 83 in the second. He was rewarded with a place in the India squad for the 2001 tour of South Africa. Williams played in the test match at Centurion Park, but the match was made unofficial due to Indian protests over the suspension of Virender Sehwag.
