= Vivek Jaisimha =

Indian former first-class cricketer (born 1964)

Personal information
- Born: 18 March 1964 (age 62); Hyderabad, Andhra Pradesh, India
- Batting: Right-handed
- Bowling: Right-arm off break
- Role: Batsman
- Relatives: M. L. Jaisimha (father)

Domestic team information
- Years: Team
- 1982/83–1993/94: Hyderabad
- 1994/95–1997/98: Goa

Career statistics
Competition	First-class	List A
Matches	78	19
Runs scored	3,917	531
Batting average	38.40	35.40
100s/50s	8/21	1/1
Top score	211	101
Balls bowled	942	41
Wickets	12	1
Bowling average	46.91	51.00
5 wickets in innings	0	0
10 wickets in match	0	0
Best bowling	2/27	1/35
Catches/stumpings	64/–	7/–
- Source: ESPNcricinfo, 18 February 2016

Vivek Jaisimha (born 18 March 1964) is an Indian former first-class cricketer who represented Hyderabad and Goa. He is the son of former India international cricketer M. L. Jaisimha.

== Life and career ==
Jaisimha was born on 18 March 1964 in Hyderabad. His father M. L. Jaisimha was also a batsman who played 39 Test matches for India.

Jaisimha was a right-handed batsman and occasional right-arm off break bowler. He played for Hyderabad for 12 seasons from 1982/83 to 1993/94 and Goa for four seasons from 1994/95 to 1997/98. He was part of the Hyderabad team that won the 1986–87 Ranji Trophy and 1987–88 Irani Cup. Jaisimha was one of the top five run-getters of the 1989–90 Ranji Trophy with 534 runs at an average of over 59. He finished his career with close to 4000 runs in 78 first-class matches and more than 500 runs in 19 List A matches.

Jaisimha became a coach after retirement. He worked as the assistant coach of Hyderabad in the early- and mid-2000s. Between 2008 and 2010, he worked as a match referee. He was the batting coach of Hyderabad until November 2010, when he resigned from the position in the aftermath of Hyderabad getting bowled out for 21, the lowest ever Ranji total, in a match against Rajasthan. He then worked as one of the coaches at the Hyderabad Cricket Association's Cricket Academy of Excellence.
