= Venugopal Rao (cricketer) =

Indian former cricketer (born 1982)

Personal information
- Full name: Yalaka Venugopal Rao
- Born: 26 February 1982 (age 44); Visakhapatnam, India
- Batting: Right-handed
- Bowling: Right arm off spin
- Role: Batsman
- Relatives: Gnaneswara Rao (brother)

International information
- National side: India
- ODI debut (cap 160): 30 July 2005 v Sri Lanka
- Last ODI: 23 May 2006 v West Indies

Domestic team information
- Years: Team
- 1998–2007, 2009-2012, 2017: Andhra
- 2007–2008: Maharashtra
- 2008–2009: Rajasthan
- 2012–2015: Gujarat
- 2008–2010: Deccan Chargers
- 2011–2013: Delhi Daredevils
- 2014: Sunrisers Hyderabad

Career statistics
Competition	ODI	FC	LA	T20
Matches	16	121	137	83
Runs scored	218	7,081	4,110	1,390
Batting average	24.22	40.93	38.77	23.55
100s/50s	0/1	17/30	11/25	0/7
Top score	61*	228*	115*	71*
Balls bowled	0	5,232	3,043	306
Wickets	–	66	53	8
Bowling average	–	37.15	46.73	56.00
5 wickets in innings	–	0	1	0
10 wickets in match	–	0	0	0
Best bowling	–	4/34	5/20	2/23
Catches/stumpings	6/–	89/–	45/–	17/–
- Source: ESPNcricinfo, 15 April 2018

Yalaka Venugopal Rao (born 26 February 1982) is an Indian former cricketer. He played as a right-handed middle-order batsman and right arm off-break bowler. He was the first Indian "super sub" in One Day International (ODI) cricket. He majorly played for his home state Andhra in first-class cricket and then went on to play for India between 2005 and 2006. He also opened the batting for India in a one-day series in Zimbabwe. His younger brother, Gnaneswara Rao played for Kochi Tuskers Kerala in IPL. He also played for Maharashtra, Rajasthan and Gujarat between 2007 and 2015 and in between came back to play for Andhra between 2009 and 2012 and came back again for a single match in 2017 season.

== International career ==
Venugopal Rao started his career playing for Andhra in domestic matches and impressed Indian selectors with a First-class average of over 50 and List-A average of around 40. This included one innings in the Ranji Trophy for South Zone where he scored 223 against a touring England A team which included Test bowlers such as Simon Jones and Andrew Flintoff.

He consequently earned a call up to the national side for the 2005 Indian Oil Cup in July 2005, after captain Sourav Ganguly was dropped from the team. He made sporadic appearances throughout the Indian 2005/06 season, mostly when other players were being rested under a rotation policy. He was unable to establish a position in the team, and did not play any further ODIs after May 2006. His poor domestic form further led him to out of contention for national team.

== Indian Premier League ==
Rao was selected into the Deccan Chargers in the Indian Premier League in 2008. He was part of their successful 2009 campaign. He was bought by Delhi for 70 lakh INR for IPL 2011. For IPL 2014, he was purchased by Sunrisers Hyderabad for 55 lakh INR but was released after the season.

== Coaching career ==
He was appointed as Director of cricket for GMR Group based owned Delhi Capitals
