= Raju Bhatkal =

Indian cricketer (born 1985)

Personal information
- Full name: Raju Ravi Bhatkal
- Born: 1 September 1985 (age 40); Belgaum, Karnataka
- Batting: Right-handed
- Bowling: Right-arm medium
- Role: All-rounder

Domestic team information
- Years: Team
- 2011–2013: Royal Challengers Bangalore
- Source: ESPNcricinfo

Raju Bhatkal (born 1 September 1985) is an Indian former first-class cricketer. He played as a right-handed batsman and right-arm medium pace bowler for Karnataka in the Ranji Trophy, one day games and Inter-State T20 tournament. Other teams he played for included Malnad Gladiators and IPL Franchise Royal Challengers Bangalore.

He made his Ranji debut in 2006–07 against Saurashtra at Rajkot, scoring 42 runs batting at number nine and taking three wickets for 53 runs. He made his debut with Royal Challengers Bangalore on 29 September 2011, scoring 25 runs in 18 balls.
