= Ravneet Ricky =

Indian cricketer (born 1980)

Personal information
- Born: 17 October 1980 (age 46); Amritsar, India
- Source: ESPNcricinfo, 12 December 2016

Ravneet Ricky (born 17 October 1980) is an Indian cricketer. He played 73 first-class and 40 List A matches between 1997 and 2008. He was also part of India's squad for the U-15 World Cup in 1996, and 2000 Under-19 Cricket World Cup.
