= Gnaneswara Rao (cricketer) =

Indian cricketer (born 1984)

Personal information
- Full name: Yalaka Gnaneswara Rao
- Born: 25 August 1984 (age 42); Visakhapatnam, Andhra Pradesh, India
- Batting: Right-handed
- Bowling: Right arm medium
- Role: All-rounder
- Relatives: Venugopal Rao (brother)

Domestic team information
- Years: Team
- 2000/01–present: Andhra
- 2011: Kochi Tuskers Kerala
- FC debut: 1 November 2000 Andhra v Kerala
- Last FC: 25 December 2007 Andhra v Bengal
- LA debut: 7 January 2004 Andhra v Goa
- Last LA: 26 March 2008 South Zone v West Zone

Career statistics
Competition	FC	LA	T20
Matches	44	40	23
Runs scored	1592	994	429
Batting average	23.76	28.40	22.57
100s/50s	1/12	1/7	0/3
Top score	111	159*	71*
Balls bowled	1108	616	114
Wickets	22	18	1
Bowling average	23.18	28.33	162.00
5 wickets in innings	1	0	0
10 wickets in match	0	0	0
Best bowling	5/16	3/42	1/18
Catches/stumpings	27/–	25/–	9/–
- Source: ESPNcricinfo, 22 May 2013

Yalaka Gnaneswara Rao (born 25 August 1984) is an Indian cricketer. He is a right-handed batsman and right-arm medium pace bowler. He made his first-class debut in the 2000/01 season and was also a member of Kochi Tuskers Kerala in 2011 IPL season. He also captained India Under-19 cricket team in its tour of England which included future international cricketers like Ambati Rayudu, Suresh Raina, Irfan Pathan, and Timil Patel. His older brother, Venugopal Rao played international cricket for India.
