= Kaushik Reddy =

Indian cricketer (born 1984)

Padi Kaushik Reddy
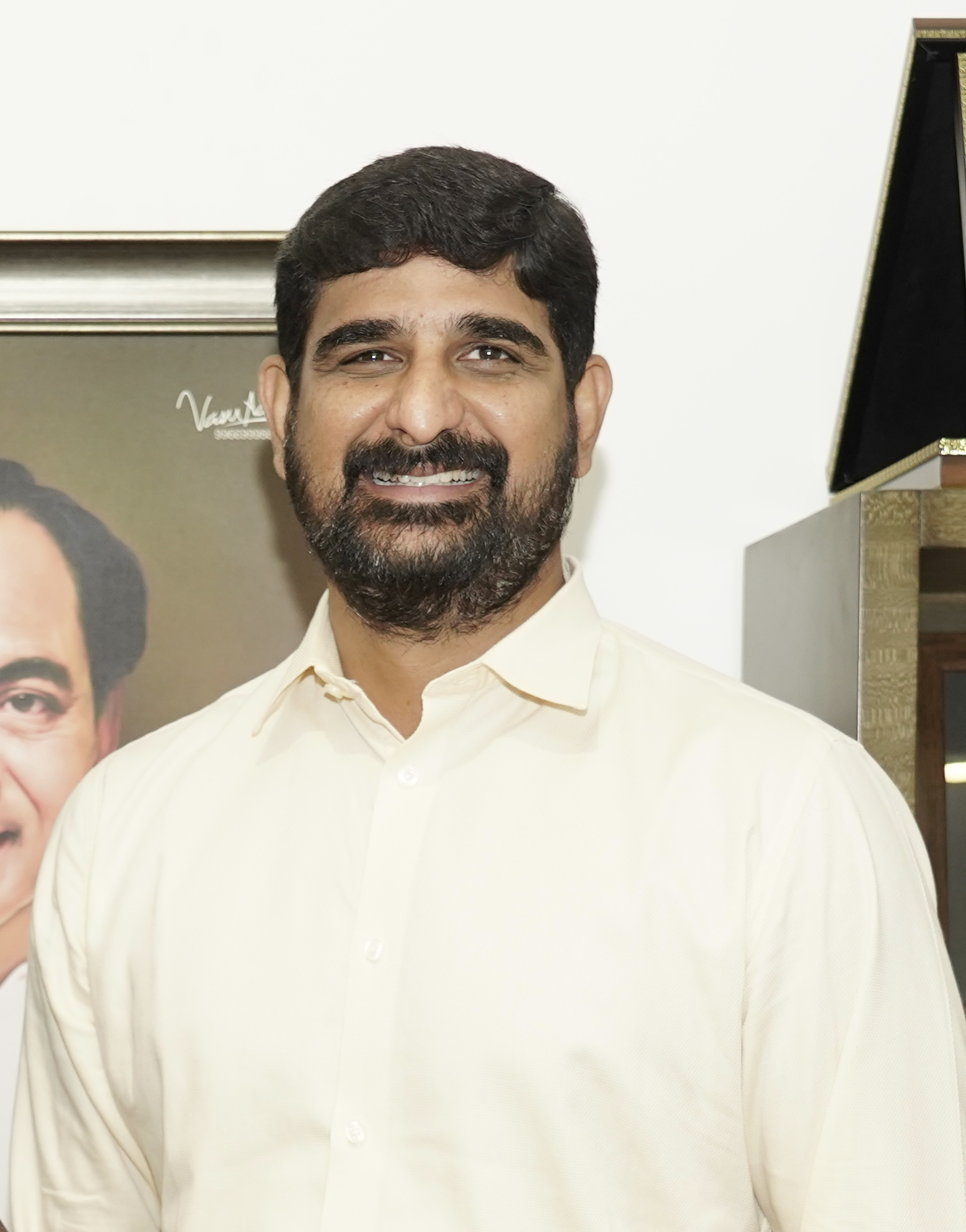

Personal information
- Born: 21 December 1984 (age 41); Karimnagar, India

Domestic team information
- Years: Team
- 2004-2007: Hyderabad

Career statistics
Competition	FC	LA
Matches	15	12
Runs scored	299	38
Batting average	14.95	5.42
100s/50s	0/1	0/0
Top score	51*	13
Balls bowled	2,665	613
Wickets	47	17
Bowling average	27.10	30.41
5 wickets in innings	2	0
10 wickets in match	1	0
Best bowling	6/31	3/36
Catches/stumpings	3/0	1/0
- Source: ESPNcricinfo, 22 August 2018

Padi Kaushik Reddy (born 21 December 1984) is an Indian politician and member of legislative Assembly (MLA) from Huzurabad Assembly constituency in Telangana & Indian former cricketer. He played fifteen first-class matches for Hyderabad between 2004 and 2007.

Currently as Member of Legislative Assembly (MLA) of Huzurabad Assembly constituency in Telangana state by BRS party.

== Political career ==
In 2018 Assembly polls Kaushik Reddy unsuccessfully contested on Congress ticket against the then TRS candidate Etela Rajender from Huzurabad. After Etela Rajender Resigned to Assembly after land grabbing charges were filed against him by Telangana Government, Kaushik Reddy joined the TRS Party in the presence of party president and Chief Minister K Chandrasekhar Rao on 21 July 2021.

Padi Kaushik Reddy is Nominated as MLC in Governor Quota under social service category on 21 July 2021 and sent to Governor Tamilisai Soundararajan for approval. on 16 November 2021 governor did not approve his candidature through governor quota. Kaushik Reddy was elected unanimously as MLC under MLA's Quota on 22 November 2021.

== See also ==
- List of Hyderabad cricketers
