= Doddapaneni Rushi Raj =

Indian cricketer (born 1986)

Personal information
- Born: 3 April 1986 (age 40); Hyderabad, India

Domestic team information
- Years: Team
- 2007-2009: Hyderabad

Career statistics
Competition	FC	LA	T20
Matches	5	4	4
Runs scored	200	29	111
Batting average	20.00	7.25	27.75
100s/50s	0/1	0/0	0/0
Top score	56	16	46
Catches/stumpings	0/0	1/0	1/0
- Source: ESPNcricinfo, 22 August 2018

Doddapaneni Rushi Raj (born 3 April 1986) is an Indian former cricketer. He played five first-class matches for Hyderabad between 2008 and 2009.

== See also ==
- List of Hyderabad cricketers
