= Shashank Nag =

Indian cricketer (born 1982)

Personal information
- Born: 20 August 1982 (age 44); Gollapudi, India

Domestic team information
- Years: Team
- 2004-2012: Hyderabad

Career statistics
| Competition | FC | List A | T20 |
|---|---|---|---|
| Matches | 17 | 6 | 2 |
| Runs scored | 518 | 184 | 55 |
| Batting average | 19.18 | 30.66 | 27.50 |
| 100s/50s | 0/4 | 0/2 | 0/0 |
| Top score | 68 | 66 | 32 |
| Catches/stumpings | 13/0 | 2/0 | 1/0 |
- Source: ESPNcricinfo, 3 July 2018

Shashank Nag (born 20 August 1982) is an Indian former cricketer. He played seventeen first-class matches for Hyderabad between 2004 and 2010.

== See also ==
- List of Hyderabad cricketers
