= Mungala Arjun =

Indian cricketer (born 1986)

Personal information
- Full name: Munagala Praneet Arjun
- Born: 11 January 1986 (age 40); Hyderabad, India

Domestic team information
- Years: Team
- 2006-2013: Hyderabad

Career statistics
Competition	FC	List A	T20
Matches	23	21	8
Runs scored	477	138	18
Batting average	14.02	13.80	4.50
100s/50s	0/1	0/0	0/0
Top score	71	23*	7
Balls bowled	3,878	938	121
Wickets	57	15	2
Bowling average	32.47	47.66	78.50
5 wickets in innings	2	0	0
10 wickets in match	0	0	0
Best bowling	7/56	3/19	2/25
Catches/stumpings	4/0	3/0	2/0
- Source: ESPNcricinfo, 3 Jul 2018

Mungala Arjun (born 11 January 1986) is an Indian former cricketer. He played 23 first-class matches for Hyderabad between 2006 and 2013.

== See also ==
- List of Hyderabad cricketers
