= Ibrahim Khaleel =

Indian cricketer

M Ibrahim Khaleel
Personal information
- Full name: M Ibrahim Khaleel
- Born: 9 October 1982 (age 44); Hyderabad, Telangana, India
- Batting: Right-handed
- Role: Wicket-keeper

International information
- National side: United States

Domestic team information
- Years: Team
- 2002–present: Hyderabad
- 2007–2008: Hyderabad Heroes

Career statistics
Competition	FC	List A	T20
Matches	57	47	18
Runs scored	2,158	818	224
Batting average	29.16	22.72	17.23
100s/50s	3/9	0/5	0/1
Top score	141	78	68*
Catches/stumpings	186/25	59/17	14/7
- Source: ESPNcricinfo, 23 June 2018

Ibrahim Khaleel is an Indian cricketer who played as a wicket-keeper for Hyderabad and former captain of the United States national cricket team. A right-handed batsman, Khaleel made his first-class debut in 2002. In 2007, he opted to participate in the now defunct Indian Cricket League, competing for the Hyderabad Heroes. He returned to authorised cricket in 2009, returning to play for Hyderabad. In a 2011 Ranji Trophy match against Assam, he set a record for the most dismissals in a first-class match by a wicket-keeper; taking 14 in total.

== Career ==
Having played for Hyderabad's youth teams at Under-16 and Under-19 level, he made his first-class cricket debut for the team in November 2002, facing Mumbai in a Ranji Trophy match. He took five catches in the first innings of the contest, and two further catches and a stumping in the second. In late 2005, Khaleel reached his first century in first-class cricket, remaining 128 not out against Andhra. He followed this up with another century in his next match, reaching 102 in the second innings against Punjab. Later that month, he bettered his debut performance with the gloves, taking nine catches in a match against Services.

He chose to participate in the Indian Cricket League (ICL) for the duration of its existence, ruling him out of international selection, or participation in any cricket authorised by the Board of Control for Cricket in India (BCCI). He was part of the Hyderabad Heroes side which won the ICL 20s Grand Championship 2007–08, and the ICL India XI which won the ICL 20s World Series 2007–08.

When the BCCI offered an amnesty for ICL players to return to first-class cricket, Khaleel joined the majority of his colleagues in accepting the offer, and made his return for Hyderabad in November 2009. He bettered his previous best with the bat in late 2010, scoring 141 runs in the first innings against Jharkhand, sharing a partnership of 175 runs with Bavanaka Sandeep in the process. A year later, in a match against Assam, he took four catches and three stumpings in the first innings and another seven catches in the second innings to set a new record for the total number of wicket-keeper dismissals in a first-class match. The previous record had been set by Wayne James, who took eleven catches and two stumpings in the 1995–96 Logan Cup final.

In March 2017, he was called up to a selection camp with the potential of representing the United States at the 2017 ICC World Cricket League Division Three tournament. Khaleel has played league cricket in Chicago and has US permanent residency status. In September 2017, he was appointed the captain of the United States side, ahead of the Auty Cup. In January 2018, he was named as the captain of the United States squad for the 2017–18 Regional Super50 tournament in the West Indies.

On 3 June 2018, he was selected to play for the Montreal Tigers in the players' draft for the inaugural edition of the Global T20 Canada tournament. In August 2018, he was named as the captain of the United States' squad for the 2018–19 ICC World Twenty20 Americas Qualifier tournament in Morrisville, North Carolina.

In October 2018, he was sacked as captain of the United States team and replaced by Saurabh Netravalkar.
