= Amol Shinde =

Indian cricketer (born 1985)

Personal information
- Born: 6 November 1985 (age 41); Hyderabad, India

Domestic team information
- Years: Team
- 2005-2014: Hyderabad

Career statistics
Competition	FC	LA	T20
Matches	23	38	20
Runs scored	965	722	85
Batting average	26.08	27.76	10.62
100s/50s	0/6	0/1	0/0
Top score	97	61	28
Balls bowled	3,722	1,638	360
Wickets	40	36	18
Bowling average	44.45	38.50	24.05
5 wickets in innings	1	0	0
10 wickets in match	0	0	0
Best bowling	5/78	4/41	3/17
Catches/stumpings	9/0	17/0	13/0
- Source: ESPNcricinfo, 21 June 2018

Amol Shinde (born 6 November 1985) is an Indian first-class cricketer who plays for Hyderabad, which is part of the Ranji Trophy Plate Group.
