= Inder Shekar Reddy =

Indian cricketer (born 1980)

Personal information
- Born: 20 December 1980 (age 45); Hyderabad, India

Domestic team information
- Years: Team
- 2006-2010: Hyderabad

Career statistics
Competition	FC	LA	T20
Matches	17	32	6
Runs scored	271	131	23
Batting average	13.55	11.90	-
100s/50s	0/1	0/0	0/0
Top score	53*	20*	19*
Balls bowled	3,088	1,715	126
Wickets	49	40	6
Bowling average	24.26	30.17	19.33
5 wickets in innings	0	1	0
10 wickets in match	0	0	0
Best bowling	4/28	5/28	3/20
Catches/stumpings	5/0	11/0	4/0
- Source: ESPNcricinfo, 20 July 2018

Inder Shekar Reddy (born 20 December 1980) is an Indian former cricketer. He played seventeen first-class matches for Hyderabad between 2001 and 2006.

== See also ==
- List of Hyderabad cricketers
