= Arjun Yadav =

Indian cricketer (born 1981)

N.Arjun Yadav
Personal information
- Full name: Arjun Shivalal Yadav
- Born: 23 December 1981 (age 44); Palghat, Kerala, India
- Batting: Right-handed
- Bowling: Off break
- Role: Batsman

Domestic team information
- Years: Team
- 2008: Deccan Chargers
- 1999-2012: Hyderabad
- 1999: India Blue

Career statistics
Competition	FC	LA	T20
Matches	83	69	19
Runs scored	3,703	1,393	198
Batting average	28.05	21.76	14.14
100s/50s	5/18	0/9	0/0
Top score	155	96*	44
Balls bowled	585	318	–
Wickets	12	8	–
Bowling average	25.66	41.37	–
5 wickets in innings	0	0	–
10 wickets in match	0	0	–
Best bowling	3/25	2/5	–
Catches/stumpings	30/0	22/0	2/0
- Source: ESPNcricinfo, 3 July 2018

Arjun Yadav is an Indian first-class cricketer. He was a member of the Indian Premier League team Deccan Chargers and was also part of the 2000 Under-19 Cricket World Cup-winning India national under-19 cricket team.

He was selected as the coach of the Hyderabad cricket team, but was later sacked as the selection caused controversy.
