= Dwaraka Ravi Teja =

Indian cricketer (born 1987)

Personal information
- Full name: Dwaraka Bhamidipati Ravi Teja
- Born: 5 September 1987 (age 39); Kakinada, Andhra Pradesh, India
- Batting: Right-handed
- Bowling: Right-arm leg spin
- Role: Batsman

Domestic team information
- Years: Team
- 2006–2016: Hyderabad
- 2008–2012: Deccan Chargers
- 2013: Sunrisers Hyderabad
- 2017–2019: Andhra
- 2019–2022: Meghalaya
- FC debut: 23 November 2006 Hyderabad v Maharashtra
- Last FC: 9 November 2017 Andhra v Tripura
- LA debut: 13 February 2006 Hyderabad v Tamil Nadu
- Last LA: 25 February 2018 Andhra v Saurashtra

Career statistics
Competition	FC	LA	T20
Matches	78	85	89
Runs scored	4722	2942	1618
Batting average	41.06	44.57	26.09
100s/50s	12/22	6/13	1/7
Top score	204*	131	101*
Balls bowled	2232	993	126
Wickets	35	24	6
Bowling average	30.74	34.62	27.50
5 wickets in innings	1	1	0
10 wickets in match	0	0	0
Best bowling	5/20	5/45	1/0
Catches/stumpings	61/0	41/0	30/0
- Source: ESPNcricinfo, 22 June 2022

Dwaraka Ravi Teja is an Indian first-class cricketer plays for Meghalaya and previously for Andhra and Hyderabad. He was also a member of IPL team Deccan Chargers (2008–2012) and Sunrisers Hyderabad(2013). He was part of under-19 India team and also India A squad. He announced his retirement in 2022 completing his career after 16 years.

Ravi Teja coached Hyderabad for 2023–24 season and helped them return to Elite group in Ranji Trophy.
