= Pragyan Ojha =

Former Indian cricketer

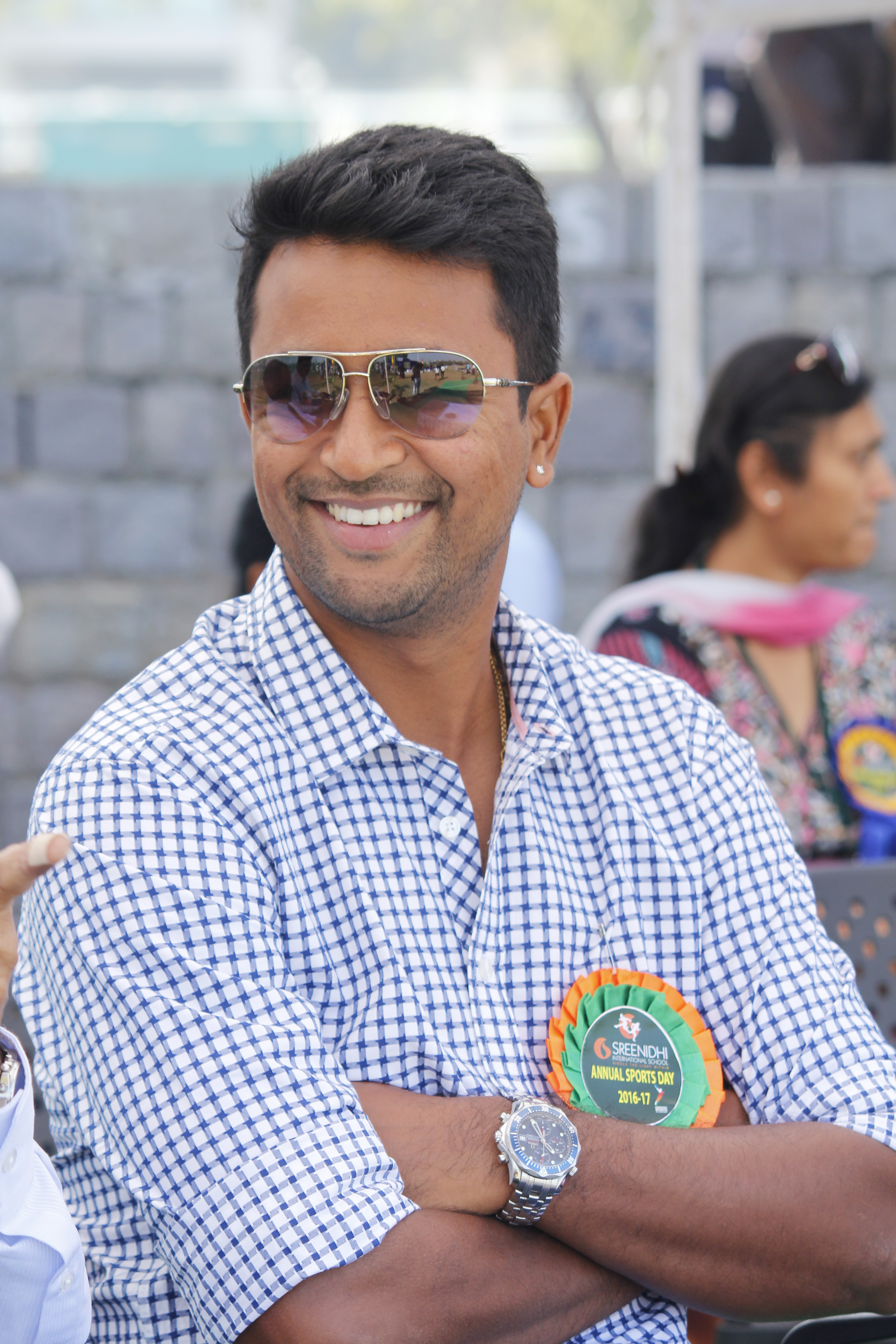

Personal information
- Full name: Pragyan Prayash Ojha
- Born: 5 September 1986 (age 40); Bhubaneshwar, Odisha, India
- Height: 1.83 m (6 ft 0 in)
- Batting: Left-handed
- Bowling: Slow left arm orthodox
- Role: Bowler

International information
- National side: India (2008–2013)
- Test debut (cap 261): 24 November 2009 v Sri Lanka
- Last Test: 14 November 2013 v West Indies
- ODI debut (cap 174): 28 June 2008 v Bangladesh
- Last ODI: 24 July 2012 v Sri Lanka
- T20I debut (cap 29): 6 June 2009 v Bangladesh
- Last T20I: 13 June 2010 v Zimbabwe

Domestic team information
- Years: Team
- 2004/05–2015/16: Hyderabad
- 2008–2011: Deccan Chargers
- 2012–2015: Mumbai Indians
- 2011: Surrey
- 2015/16–2016/17: Bengal
- 2018/19: Bihar

Career statistics
Competition	Test	ODI	T20I	FC
Matches	24	18	6	108
Runs scored	89	46	10	848
Batting average	8.90	23.00	–	9.02
100s/50s	0/0	0/0	0/0	0/1
Top score	18*	16*	10*	51
Balls bowled	7,633	876	126	25,330
Wickets	113	21	10	424
Bowling average	30.27	31.05	13.20	28.60
5 wickets in innings	7	1	1	23
10 wickets in match	1	0	0	3
Best bowling	6/47	5/3	4/21	7/8
Catches/stumpings	10/–	7/–	1/–	35/–
Medal record
Men's Cricket
Representing India
ACC Asia Cup
Winner	2010 Sri Lanka
Runner-up	2008 Pakistan
- Source: ESPNcricinfo, 21 February 2020

Pragyan Ojha (born 5 September 1986) is an Indian former cricketer and the current Chief selector of senior men's national cricket team selection committee. He has represented India in all forms of cricket. He played as an attacking left-arm orthodox bowler and left-handed tail-ender batsman for Hyderabad. In his 24 Tests, he only managed to score 89 runs. In fact, he is among the few cricketers who have taken more wickets than the runs they have scored in Test cricket. He was a part of the Indian squad which won the 2010 Asia Cup. He became the historic 800th Test wicket of Muttiah Muralitharan.

== Career ==
Ojha's earliest pursuit in cricket was at the age of 10, when he went to the Saheed Sporting Club for a summer camp in Bhubaneswar under Sasang S Das, while studying at D.A.V. Public School, Chandrasekharpur. He started playing for the Saheed Sporting Club in the junior tournaments for the club and city. Four years later, he moved to Hyderabad to pursue studies and chose cricket as his profession under the guidance of his coach T. Vijay Paul.

Ojha made his debut in first class cricket in 2004/05 and represented India at the under-19 level as well. He finished the 2006–07 Ranji Trophy season with 29 wickets with an impressive average of 19.89 in just 6 games. The left arm spinner is known for his ability to flight the ball.

Ojha represented Hyderabad Cricket Association in domestic cricket from 2004 till 2015, then played for Cricket Association of Bengal as a guest player for couple of seasons (2015/16-2016/17). He has previously played for Deccan Chargers and Mumbai Indians in the Indian Premier League. His high success in the first couple of seasons in domestic cricket and the IPL ensured his selection in the 15-man Indian squad for the Bangladesh tour and Asia Cup in 2008.

He played his first One Day International match against Bangladesh on 28 June 2008 in Karachi and ended up with figures of 2/43.

On 24 November 2009, Ojha made his Test debut in the Second Test against Sri Lanka in Kanpur, replacing Amit Mishra and gaining figures of 2/37 off 23 overs and 2/36 off of 15.3 overs in India's 100th Test win. He then took five wickets in the Third Test in another innings win for India, taking nine wickets at 28.66 in two Tests. Ojha became the 800th and final Test victim of Muttiah Muralitharan, the highest wicket-taker in Test history.

In his T20 debut against Bangladesh on 6 June 2009, he took 4/21 in four overs. He was awarded Man of the Match for his match-winning performance.

He has performed exceedingly well in the six editions of IPL, earning him the praise of his captain Adam Gilchrist and Sachin Tendulkar. He was all the more successful in the second season, which ensured his selection in the 2009 ICC World Twenty20 in England. IPL 3 he was awarded the Purple Cap for picking up the most wickets in the tournament. He has been part of 3 IPL winning teams (1 for Deccan Chargers & 2 for Mumbai Indians) & 1 champions League for Mumbai Indians.

In August, 2011 he signed to play for Surrey for the final few weeks of the 2011 season.[2] His 24 wickets in 4 games helped Surrey to promotion to Division One of the LV County Championship.

In November, during the First Test of the West Indies Tour of India he staged a marvelous comeback taking 6 wickets for 72 runs in the first innings.

In December, 2014 Ojha was barred from bowling in competitive cricket after his action was found to be illegal. Later on 30 January 2015 Ojha cleared the test and was allowed to resume his bowling.

In a 2008 interview, Ojha said that Venkatapathy Raju, who was also a left-arm spinner, inspired him to play for India.

Ahead of the 2018–19 Ranji Trophy, he transferred from Hyderabad to Bihar.

On 21 February 2020, he has announced his retirement from all forms of cricket. He played 48 international matches - 24 Tests, 18 ODIs and 6 T20Is - from 2008 to 2013. In his last game for India, a Test against West Indies in 2013, which was Sachin Tendulkar's farewell match, he finished with match figures of 10 for 89 and was named the Man of the Match.

== Personal life ==
Ojha was born in Bhubaneswar, Odisha. He moved to Hyderabad at the age of 14 and since then he has been residing there with his family. His parents are Maheswar Ojha (retired State Govt. Officer) and Bidulata Ojha (M.A in literature). On 16 May 2010 he married Karabee Baral, daughter of Kailash Chandra Baral and Chanchala Naik, both professors at English and Foreign Languages University.
