= Bharat Chipli =

Indian cricketer

Personal information
- Born: 27 January 1983 (age 43); Sagara, Karnataka, India
- Batting: Right-handed
- Bowling: Right-arm medium
- Role: Batsman

Domestic team information
- Years: Team
- 2006–2012: Karnataka
- 2008: Royal Challengers Bangalore
- 2011–2012: Deccan Chargers
- 2013: Delhi Daredevils (squad no. 25)

Career statistics
Competition	FC	LA	T20
Matches	20	21	30
Runs scored	1,128	605	453
Batting average	37.60	31.84	21.57
100s/50s	3/4	3/1	0/2
Top score	159*	109*	61*
Balls bowled	222	108	24
Wickets	0	5	1
Bowling average	–	13.20	44.00
5 wickets in innings	–	0	0
10 wickets in match	–	0	0
Best bowling	–	2/11	1/24
Catches/stumpings	17/–	6/–	4/–
- Source: ESPNcricinfo, 22 May 2023

Bharat Chipli (born 27 January 1983) is an Indian Kannada language cricket commentator and former cricketer and who played for Karnataka in first-class cricket. He played IPL for Royal Challengers Bangalore, Deccan Chargers and Delhi Daredevils (now Delhi Capitals), making his final appearance in top-flight cricket in 2013 before retirement. He now works as a commentator for Star Sports Kannada.

== Career ==
He studied at BHS College, Jayanagar, Bangalore. He plays for Swastic Union Cricket Club (I) in the KSCA Group, I Division. Chipli, an aggressive opening bat and also a dynamic fielder in the Karnataka Ranji squad. The right-hander was initially a part of the Royal Challengers Bangalore and was quite recently picked up by the Deccan Chargers in the Indian Premier League.

=== IPL 2008 ===
Bharat Chipli entered the IPL season in 2008 as a member of the Royal Challengers Bangalore squad after being a consistent performer in Karnataka domestic cricket. Chipli played only three matches for RCB, scoring 20 runs, making it difficult for him to secure a regular spot in the playing XI.

=== IPL 2011 ===
Chipli was picked by the Deccan Chargers for their 2011 campaign. Chipli made his debut in IPL 4 against the formidable side Rajasthan Royals. His second match for IPL 2011 was against the Kolkata Knight Riders where he scored 48 runs off 40 balls which was the highest individual score for his team. But Deccan Chargers went on to lose that match by 9 runs. His match winning innings came against his old franchisee Royal Challengers Bangalore when he scored a blistering 65 runs off 35 balls with five 4s and three 6s.

=== IPL 2012 ===
Despite a decent 2011 IPL season, Chipli's performance in 2012 season was hindered by limited opportunities provided by his franchise.
