= Anirudh Singh (cricketer) =

Indian cricketer (born 1980)

Personal information
- Born: 2 August 1980 (age 46); Hyderabad, India
- Batting: Left-handed

Domestic team information
- Years: Team
- 2000/01–2010/11: Hyderabad
- 2010: Deccan Chargers

Career statistics
Competition	FC	LA	T20
Matches	47	33	11
Runs scored	2,490	769	97
Batting average	32.76	27.46	10.77
100s/50s	3/13	0/6	0/0
Top score	124	86*	40
Catches/stumpings	33/1	11/0	6/0
- Source: ESPNcricinfo, 20 July 2018

Anirudh Singh (born 2 August 1980) is an Indian former cricketer. He played 47 first-class matches for Hyderabad between 2000 and 2010. In January 2021, he was appointed as the coach of Hyderabad.
