= Abhinav Kumar =

Indian cricketer (born 1984)

Personal information
- Full name: Abhinav Kumar
- Born: 7 November 1984 (age 42); Hyderabad, India
- Batting: Right-handed
- Bowling: Right-arm off break

Domestic team information
- Years: Team
- 2004/05–2012/13: Hyderabad

Career statistics
Competition	FC	LA	T20
Matches	20	20	2
Runs scored	748	681	56
Batting average	24.12	37.83	56.00
100s/50s	1/4	2/4	0/1
Top score	103*	110	55*
Catches/stumpings	34/3	15/5	0/0
- Source: ESPNcricinfo, 22 August 2018

Abhinav Kumar (born 7 November 1984) is an Indian former cricketer. He played twenty first-class matches for Hyderabad between 2005 and 2012. In November 2008, he became the first player for Hyderabad to score 99 not out in a Ranji Trophy match.

== See also ==
- List of Hyderabad cricketers
