= Doddapaneni Kalyankrishna =

Indian cricketer (born 1983)

Personal information
- Full name: Doddapaneni Kalyankrishna
- Born: 16 December 1983 (age 42); Vijayawada, Andhra Pradesh, India
- Nickname: prediction kalyan; kallu; Mr. K. K
- Batting: Right-handed
- Bowling: Right arm medium fast
- Role: Batsman

Domestic team information
- Years: Team
- 2003–2014: Andhra Pradesh
- 2005–2008: South Zone (India)
- 2008: Deccan Chargers

Career statistics
Competition	FC	List A	T20
Matches	51	42	12
Runs scored	58	89	24
Batting average	8.80	11.11	2.0
100s/50s	0/0	0/0	0/0
Top score	21	34	11
Balls bowled	4683	3992	258
Wickets	59	47	14
Bowling average	32.04	29.63	35.09
5 wickets in innings	1	0	0
10 wickets in match	0	0	0
Best bowling	5/82	4/68	2/58
Catches/stumpings	16/–	12/–	3/–
- Source: ESPNcricinfo, 19 August 2012

Doddapaneni Kalyankrishna is an Indian first-class cricketer from Vijayawada, Andhra Pradesh. He plays for Andhra cricket team. He played 51 Ranji matches since 2002. Kalyankrishna was part of the Deccan Chargers roster for the IPL season of 2007–2008.

== Life ==
Kalyankrishna was born on 16 December 1983, in Vijayawada, Andhra Pradesh. He was also accounts assistant in South Central Railway, Vijayawada division.

== Career ==
Kalyan was a medium pace bowler who claimed more than 200 wickets in first class cricket. This includes 153 wickets in Ranji format. He also played in vital tournaments such a Duleep and Deodhar Trophies. He spent over 12 years in Hyderabad associating with Cricket before moving to his native place Vijayawada after the bifurcation of Andhra Pradesh in 2014. He was appointed as a head coach of Krishna District Cricket Association. He was also a commentator Indian Premier League. He delivered the commentary in Telugu for the first time in 2016.
