= 2010–11 Hyderabad C.A. season =

Hyderabad C.A.
2010–11 season
- Coach: Venkatapathy Raju (until 8 November 2010); M. V. Sridhar (from 8 November 2010)
- Captain: Dwaraka Ravi Teja
- Ground(s): Rajiv Gandhi International Cricket Stadium, Hyderabad (Capacity: 55,000)
- Syed Mushtaq Ali Trophy: South Zone (4th)
- Ranji Trophy: Plate Group A (4th)
- Vijay Hazare Trophy: South Zone (6th)

The 2010–11 season is Hyderabad cricket team's 77th competitive season. The Hyderabad cricket team is senior men's domestic cricket team based in the city of Hyderabad, India, run by the Hyderabad Cricket Association. They represent the region of Telangana in the state of Andhra Pradesh in domestic competitions.

== Competition overview ==
Category	Competition	Format	First match	Last match	Final position	Pld	W	L	D / T / NR	Win %
Senior men's	Syed Mushtaq Ali Trophy	Twenty20 cricket	14 October 2010	19 October 2010	Zonal Stage	5	2	3	0	40%
Senior men's	Ranji Trophy	First-class cricket	1 November 2010	8 December 2010	Plate League Group Stage	5	1	1	3	20%
Senior men's	Vijay Hazare Trophy	List A cricket	11 February 2011	18 February 2011	Zonal Stage	5	1	4	0	20%

== Squads ==
- Head Coach : Venkatapathy Raju (until 8 November 2010), M. V. Sridhar (after 8 November 2010)
- Batting Coach : Vivek Jaisimha (until 8 November 2010)
- Fielding Coach : Noel David

Syed Mushtaq Ali Trophy	Ranji Trophy	Vijay Hazare Trophy
Dwaraka Ravi Teja (c); Alfred Absolem; Anirudh Singh; Ashish Reddy; Neeraj Bist; Ibrahim Khaleel (wk); Pagadala Naidu; Paramveer Singh; Syed Quadri; Akshath Reddy; Inder Shekar Reddy; Amol Shinde; Tirumalasetti Suman; Benjamin Thomas; Ashwin Yadav	Dwaraka Ravi Teja (c); Ibrahim Khaleel (wk); Lalith Mohan; Vishal Sharma; Habeeb Ahmed; Mohammed Khader; Alfred Absolem; Anirudh Singh; Mungala Arjun; Pagadala Naidu; Anoop Pai; Syed Quadri; Akshath Reddy; Shashank Nag; Arjun Yadav; Hanuma Vihari; Bavanaka Sandeep; Paramveer Singh; Parth Jhala; Abdul Basheer	Pragyan Ojha (c); Dwaraka Ravi Teja; Akshath Reddy; Hanuma Vihari; Bavanaka Sandeep; Ibrahim Khaleel (wk); Habeeb Ahmed (wk); Tirumalasetti Suman; Shoaib Ahmed; Amol Shinde; Pagadala Naidu; Benjamin Thomas; Paramveer Singh; Syed Quadri; Vivek Krishna

Rayudu moved to the Baroda from the Hyderabad ahead of the 2010–11 season. Sridhar replaced Raju as the Hyderabad coach on 8 November 2010 for the rest of the season.

NKP Salve Challenger Trophy

Suman got selected to the India Green squad for the 2010-11 NKP Salve Challenger Trophy, a List-A cricket tournament in India.

Duleep Trophy

Ojha and Sandeep got selected to the South Zone squad for the 2010-11 Duleep Trophy, a first-class cricket tournament in India.

Deodhar Trophy

Ojha and Ravi Teja got selected to the South Zone squad for the 2010-11 Deodhar Trophy, a List-A cricket competition in India.

Indian Premier League

The local franchise, Deccan Chargers got Ojha while the newly formed franchise, Kochi Tuskers got Laxman in the IPL Auction. Among uncapped players, Suman got picked by the Mumbai Indians while the Deccan Chargers picked Ashish, Bhandari, Ravi Teja and Arjun Yadav for the 2011 Indian Premier League, a professional Twenty20 cricket league in India.

== Syed Mushtaq Ali Trophy ==
The Hyderabad team, led by Dwaraka Ravi Teja, began their campaign in the Syed Mushtaq Ali Trophy, a Twenty20 tournament in India, with a win against the Andhra at Hyderabad on 14 October 2010. The half-century from Paramveer Singh led the Hyderabad to 148 before their bowlers, Pagadala Naidu, Ashish Reddy and Alfred Absolem bowled out the Andhra for 58. In the second match, the half-century from Raiphi Gomez who added an unbeaten 94-run partnership with Robert Fernandez helped the Kerala register an eight wicket win before Prasanth Parameswaran's two-wicket haul held the Hyderabad to 148. The Hyderabad registered their second loss in three matches as the unbeaten half-century from Subramaniam Badrinath helped the Tamil Nadu chase the revised target of 102 in 15 overs. Earlier, the Tamil Nadu were able to put pressure on the Hyderabad by taking regular wickets and restrict them to 104. In a rain-reduced five-overs-a-side encounter, Tirumalasetti Suman's knock of 38 in 16 balls, Naidu's three-wicket haul in a single over and Amol Shinde's tight last over helped the Hyderabad defeat the Goa by 14 runs in their fourth match. The collective effort from the Karnataka's batsmen, Mayank Agarwal, Robin Uthappa and Manish Pandey helped their team register a four-wicket victory over before Aditya Sagar's four wicket haul restricted the Hyderabad to 148 in their final zonal match. This loss knocked the Hyderabad out from the tournament as they finished fourth in the South Zone with two wins and three losses.

=== Points Table ===
South Zone

Team	Pld	W	L	T	NR	Pts	NRR
Tamil Nadu	5	5	0	0	0	20	+1.355
Kerala	5	3	1	0	1	14	+0.397
Karnataka	5	3	2	0	0	12	-0.174
Hyderabad	5	2	3	0	0	8	+0.850
Goa	5	1	4	0	0	4	-0.975
Andhra	5	0	4	0	1	2	-1.716

- Top two teams advanced to knockout stage.
- Points system : W = 4, T/NR = 2, L = 0.

=== Matches ===
Zonal Stage

14 October 2010	Hyderabad; 148/6 (20 overs)	v	Andhra; 58 (12.5 overs)	Hyderabad won by 90 runs
Scorecard	Hyderabad; 148/6 (20 overs)	v	Andhra; 58 (12.5 overs)	Gymkhana Ground, Hyderabad; Umpires: Jayaraman Madanagopal and Sadashiv Iyer; Player of the match: Paramveer Singh (Hyderabad)
Scorecard	Paramveer Singh 65* (41); AG Praveen 3/21 (4 overs)		Syed Shahabuddin 23 (27); Alfred Absolem 3/8 (2.5 overs)	Gymkhana Ground, Hyderabad; Umpires: Jayaraman Madanagopal and Sadashiv Iyer; Player of the match: Paramveer Singh (Hyderabad)
Hyderabad won the toss and elected to bat.; Pramod Anil, Hemal Watekar, AG Praveen, NJSR Prasad (Andhra); Paramveer Singh (Hyderabad) all made their T20 debuts.				Gymkhana Ground, Hyderabad; Umpires: Jayaraman Madanagopal and Sadashiv Iyer; Player of the match: Paramveer Singh (Hyderabad)

15 October 2010	Hyderabad; 148/5 (20 overs)	v	Kerala; 150/2 (18.4 overs)	Kerala won by 8 wickets
Scorecard	Hyderabad; 148/5 (20 overs)	v	Kerala; 150/2 (18.4 overs)	Rajiv Gandhi International Cricket Stadium, Hyderabad; Umpires: G. A. Pratapkumar and Jayaraman Madanagopal; Player of the match: Raiphi Gomez (Kerala)
Scorecard	Dwaraka Ravi Teja 38 (41); Prasanth Parameswaran 2/17 (4 overs)		Raiphi Gomez 62* (46); Ashish Reddy 1/14 (2 overs)	Rajiv Gandhi International Cricket Stadium, Hyderabad; Umpires: G. A. Pratapkumar and Jayaraman Madanagopal; Player of the match: Raiphi Gomez (Kerala)
Hyderabad won the toss and elected to bat.; Abhishek Hegde (Kerala) made his T20 debut.				Rajiv Gandhi International Cricket Stadium, Hyderabad; Umpires: G. A. Pratapkumar and Jayaraman Madanagopal; Player of the match: Raiphi Gomez (Kerala)

16 October 2010	Hyderabad; 104/7 (17.4 overs)	v	Tamil Nadu; 102/4 (15 overs)	Tamil Nadu won by 6 wickets
Scorecard	Hyderabad; 104/7 (17.4 overs)	v	Tamil Nadu; 102/4 (15 overs)	Gymkhana Ground, Hyderabad; Umpires: G. A. Pratapkumar and Nitin Pai; Player of the match: Subramaniam Badrinath (Tamil Nadu)
Scorecard	Akshath Reddy 34 (31); C. Ganapathy 2/20 (4 overs)		Subramaniam Badrinath 51* (40); Pagadala Naidu 2/11 (3 overs)	Gymkhana Ground, Hyderabad; Umpires: G. A. Pratapkumar and Nitin Pai; Player of the match: Subramaniam Badrinath (Tamil Nadu)
Tamil Nadu won the toss and elected to field.; Syed Quadri (Hyderabad) made his T20 debut.				Gymkhana Ground, Hyderabad; Umpires: G. A. Pratapkumar and Nitin Pai; Player of the match: Subramaniam Badrinath (Tamil Nadu)

18 October 2010	Hyderabad; 62/6 (5 overs)	v	Goa; 48/6 (5 overs)	Hyderabad won by 14 runs
Scorecard	Hyderabad; 62/6 (5 overs)	v	Goa; 48/6 (5 overs)	Rajiv Gandhi International Cricket Stadium, Hyderabad; Umpires: G. A. Pratapkumar and Sadashiv Iyer; Player of the match: Pagadala Naidu (Hyderabad)
Scorecard	Tirumalasetti Suman 38 (16); Sher Yadav 3/5 (1 over)		Robin D'Souza 14 (9); Pagadala Naidu 3/5 (1 over)	Rajiv Gandhi International Cricket Stadium, Hyderabad; Umpires: G. A. Pratapkumar and Sadashiv Iyer; Player of the match: Pagadala Naidu (Hyderabad)
Goa won the toss and elected to field.; Sagun Kamat (Goa); Ashwin Yadav (Hyderabad) all made their T20 debuts.				Rajiv Gandhi International Cricket Stadium, Hyderabad; Umpires: G. A. Pratapkumar and Sadashiv Iyer; Player of the match: Pagadala Naidu (Hyderabad)

19 October 2010	Hyderabad; 148/7 (20 overs)	v	Karnataka; 152/6 (19.1 overs)	Karnataka won by 4 wickets
Scorecard	Hyderabad; 148/7 (20 overs)	v	Karnataka; 152/6 (19.1 overs)	Rajiv Gandhi International Cricket Stadium, Hyderabad; Umpires: G. A. Pratapkumar and Sadashiv Iyer
Scorecard	Dwaraka Ravi Teja 56 (51); Aditya Sagar 4/29 (4 overs)		Bharat Chipli 34 (18); Ashwin Yadav 2/20 (4 overs)	Rajiv Gandhi International Cricket Stadium, Hyderabad; Umpires: G. A. Pratapkumar and Sadashiv Iyer
Karnataka won the toss and elected to field.; Benjamin Thomas (Hyderabad); Adithya Sagar and Sunil Raju (Karnataka) all made their T20 debuts.				Rajiv Gandhi International Cricket Stadium, Hyderabad; Umpires: G. A. Pratapkumar and Sadashiv Iyer

=== Statistics ===
Most runs

Player	Mat	Inns	Runs	Ave	SR	HS	100	50
Tirumalasetti Suman	5	5	122	24.40	140.22	38	0	0
Dwaraka Ravi Teja	5	5	105	21.00	95.45	56	0	1
Paramveer Singh	5	5	93	46.50	132.85	65*	0	1

- Source: ESPNcricinfo

Most wickets

Player	Mat	Inns	Wkts	Ave	Econ	BBI	SR	4WI	5WI
Pagadala Naidu	5	5	10	10.10	6.88	3/5	8.8	0	0
Ashish Reddy	5	5	8	10.75	6.61	2/11	9.7	0	0
Ashwin Yadav	2	2	3	11.33	6.80	2/20	10.0	0	0

- Source: ESPNcricinfo

== Ranji Trophy ==
The Hyderabad team, led by Dwaraka Ravi Teja, began their campaign in the Ranji Trophy, the premier first-class cricket tournament in India, against Rajasthan at Jaipur on 1 November 2010. They were bowled out for 21, the lowest-ever total in the Ranji Trophy, in their first innings of the match against Rajasthan. In the aftermath of the batting collapse and humiliating defeat against Rajasthan, Hyderabad's head coach, Venkatapathy Raju and their batting coach, Vivek Jaisimha were sacked from their roles while the batsmen for the Hyderabad, Arjun Yadav, Anirudh Singh, Anoop Pai and Mungala Arjun were dropped from the team. The Hyderabad appointed M. V. Sridhar as the head coach for the rest of the season and promoted their U-22 batsmen, Parth Jhala, Hanuma Vihari, Bavanaka Sandeep and Abdul Basheer into the senior team. They finished fourth in Group B of the Plate League and failed to advance to the knockout stage with a win, a loss and three draws.

=== Points Table ===
Plate League Group A

Team	Pld	W	L	D	A	Pts	Q
Rajasthan	5	2	0	3	0	18	1.820
Madhya Pradesh	5	2	0	3	0	16	2.016
Goa	5	1	1	3	0	11	1.211
Hyderabad	5	1	1	3	0	11	0.760
Jharkhand	5	1	2	2	0	8	0.645
Tripura	5	1	4	0	0	5	0.500

- Top two teams advanced to knockout stage.
- Points system : Win by an innings or 10 wickets = 6, Win = 5, Draw with first innings lead = 3, Draw with first innings deficit = 1, No Result = 1, Loss = 0.

=== Matches ===
Group Stage

1–4 November 2010	Hyderabad	v	Rajasthan	Rajasthan won by an innings and 256 runs
Scorecard	21 (15.3 overs); Akshath Reddy 6 (16); Deepak Chahar 8/10 (7.3 overs)		403 (131.3 overs); Hrishikesh Kanitkar 193 (377); Alfred Absolem 5/78 (26.3 overs)	Sawai Mansingh Stadium, Jaipur; Umpires: P Chatterjee and Rajesh Deshpande; Player of the match: Deepak Chahar (Rajasthan)
Scorecard	126 (39 overs); Mungala Arjun 33 (62); Pankaj Singh 4/45 (16 overs)			Sawai Mansingh Stadium, Jaipur; Umpires: P Chatterjee and Rajesh Deshpande; Player of the match: Deepak Chahar (Rajasthan)
Rajasthan won the toss and elected to field.; Puneet Yadav, Deepak Chahar (Rajasthan); Akshath Reddy and Pagadala Naidu (Hyderabad) made their first-class debuts.; Hyderabad recorded the lowest ever total in Ranji Trophy history during their first innings.

10–13 November 2010	Jharkhand	v	Hyderabad	Match Drawn Hyderabad took first innings lead
Scorecard	200 (57.5 overs); Shiv Gautam 48 (87); Alfred Absolem 3/42 (16.5 overs)		492 (163.3 overs); Bavanaka Sandeep 144 (232); Kuldeep Sharma 3/65 (26 overs)	JSCA International Stadium Complex, Ranchi; Umpires: K. N. Ananthapadmanabhan and Ulhas Gandhe
Scorecard	387/4 (129 overs); Ishank Jaggi 200* (333); Pagadala Naidu 2/49 (22 overs)			JSCA International Stadium Complex, Ranchi; Umpires: K. N. Ananthapadmanabhan and Ulhas Gandhe
Jharkhand won the toss and elected to bat.; Hanuma Vihari and Bavanaka Sandeep (Hyderabad) made their first-class debut.

17–20 November 2010	Tripura	v	Hyderabad	Hyderabad won by an innings and 35 runs
Scorecard	140 (63.4 overs); Rajib Saha 71 (166); Pagadala Naidu 4/36 (15 overs)		312 (97.4 overs); Bavanaka Sandeep 76 (130); Rana Dutta 5/78 (23.4 overs)	Gymkhana Ground, Hyderabad; Umpires: Virender Sharma and Navdeep Singh
Scorecard	137 (53.5 overs); Biswajit Dey 31 (83); Dwaraka Ravi Teja 5/20 (10.5 overs)			Gymkhana Ground, Hyderabad; Umpires: Virender Sharma and Navdeep Singh
Hyderabad won the toss and elected to field.

1–4 December 2010	Goa	v	Hyderabad	Match Drawn Goa took first innings lead
Scorecard	482 (127.1 overs); Reagan Pinto 154 (273); Mohammed Khader 3/87 (17 overs)		394 (179.4 overs); Dwaraka Ravi Teja 126 (256); Amit Yadav 4/68 (37 overs)	Rajiv Gandhi International Stadium, Hyderabad; Umpires: Subramaniam Viswanath and C. K. Nandan
Scorecard	127/2 (34 overs); Vaibhav Naik 58* (94); Alfred Absolem 1/18 (5 overs)			Rajiv Gandhi International Stadium, Hyderabad; Umpires: Subramaniam Viswanath and C. K. Nandan
Hyderabad won the toss and elected to field.

8–11 December 2010	Madhya Pradesh	v	Hyderabad	Match Drawn
Scorecard	422/4d (112 overs); Mohnish Mishra 214 (279); Pagadala Naidu 1/37 (20 overs)		286/6 (95 overs); Hanuma Vihari 81 (150); Abbas Ali 1/13 (4 overs)	Gymkhana Ground, Hyderabad; Umpires: Shashank Ranade and Bharati Vij
Hyderabad won the toss and elected to field.; Paramveer Singh and Abdul Basheer (Hyderabad) made their first-class debuts.

=== Statistics ===
Most runs

Player	Mat	Inns	Runs	Ave	SR	HS	100	50
Bavanaka Sandeep	4	4	287	71.75	47.99	144	1	1
Syed Quadri	5	6	283	47.16	60.34	76	0	4
Ibrahim Khaleel	5	6	222	44.40	38.67	141	1	0

- Source: ESPNcricinfo

Most wickets

Player	Mat	Inns	Wkts	Ave	Econ	BBI	SR	5WI	10WM
Pagadala Naidu	5	8	16	23.50	2.74	4/36	51.3	0	0
Alfred Absolem	5	8	15	32.66	3.30	5/78	59.3	1	0
Lalith Mohan	4	7	10	40.20	2.64	3/124	91.3	0	0

- Source: ESPNcricinfo

== Vijay Hazare Trophy ==
The Hyderabad team, led by Dwaraka Ravi Teja, began their campaign in the Vijay Hazare Trophy, a List-A cricket tournament in India, with a loss against the Andhra at Palakkad on 11 February 2011. An all-round performance from the Andhra bowlers led by Shankara Rao and Tekkami Atchuta Rao restricted the Hyderabad to 115 while their batsmen completed the chase with six wickets to spare. In the second match, the half-centuries from Ravi Teja and Akshath Reddy eased the Hyderabad chase as they register their first win of this tournament by seven wickets against the Kerala. Earlier, the Kerala batsmen were troubled by the Hyderabad spinners, Amol Shinde and Pragyan Ojha to restrict them to 222. In the third match, Goa spinners shared eight wickets between them as they bowled out the Hyderabad to 158 while an unbeaten half-century from Rohit Asnodkar completed the chase with a seven-wicket win for the Goa. The Karnataka opener, Ganesh Satish completed the chase with more than 16 overs to spare while their seamers, Abhimanyu Mithun and Vinay Kumar, earlier troubled the Hyderabad top-order to restrict them for 120 and hand their third loss in four matches. Dinesh Karthik's unbeaten knock of 154 in just 83 balls supported by the century from Abhinav Mukund helped the Tamil Nadu score 376 against the Hyderabad in the last zonal match. The Hyderabad started the chase strongly with a century from Ravi Teja but no support from the other end led the Hyderabad lose the match by 88 runs as they finished sixth in the South Zone and failed to qualify for the knockout stage with a win and four losses.

=== Points Table ===
South Zone

Team	Pld	W	L	T	NR	Pts	NRR
Tamil Nadu	5	5	0	0	0	22	+0.999
Karnataka	5	4	1	0	0	18	+0.947
Goa	5	3	2	0	0	11	-0.479
Kerala	5	1	4	0	0	5	-0.089
Andhra	5	1	4	0	0	4	+0.045
Hyderabad	5	1	4	0	0	0	-1.407

- Top two teams advanced to knockout stage.

=== Matches ===
Zonal Stage

11 February 2011	Hyderabad; 115 (36.4 overs)	v	Andhra; 116/4 (23.3 overs)	Andhra won by 6 wickets
Scorecard	Hyderabad; 115 (36.4 overs)	v	Andhra; 116/4 (23.3 overs)	Fort Maidan, Palakkad; Umpires: Krishnaraj Srinath and Seetharam Prabhu
Scorecard	Dwaraka Ravi Teja 47 (53); Shankara Rao 3/34 (10 overs)		Yalaka Venugopal Rao 24* (14); Pagadala Naidu 2/31 (7 overs)	Fort Maidan, Palakkad; Umpires: Krishnaraj Srinath and Seetharam Prabhu
Hyderabad won the toss and elected to bat.; Prasanth Kumar (Andhra); Bavanaka Sandeep and Hanuma Vihari (Hyderabad) all made their List-A debuts.; Points : Andhra 5; Hyderabad -1				Fort Maidan, Palakkad; Umpires: Krishnaraj Srinath and Seetharam Prabhu

12 February 2011	Kerala; 222 (50 overs)	v	Hyderabad; 223/3 (46.5 overs)	Hyderabad won by 7 wickets
Scorecard	Kerala; 222 (50 overs)	v	Hyderabad; 223/3 (46.5 overs)	Fort Maidan, Palakkad; Umpires: Krishnaraj Srinath and Seetharam Prabhu
Scorecard	VA Jagadeesh 82 (120); Amol Shinde 4/41 (10 overs)		Akshath Reddy 86 (104); Prasanth Parameswaran 1/31 (9 overs)	Fort Maidan, Palakkad; Umpires: Krishnaraj Srinath and Seetharam Prabhu
Kerala won the toss and elected to bat.; Points : Hyderabad 4; Kerala 0				Fort Maidan, Palakkad; Umpires: Krishnaraj Srinath and Seetharam Prabhu

15 February 2011	Hyderabad; 158 (45.4 overs)	v	Goa; 162/3 (39.5 overs)	Goa won by 7 wickets
Scorecard	Hyderabad; 158 (45.4 overs)	v	Goa; 162/3 (39.5 overs)	Fort Maidan, Palakkad; Umpires: Sadanand Viswanath and G. A. Pratapkumar
Scorecard	Benjamin Thomas 45 (64); Amit Yadav 3/22 (8 overs)		Rohit Asnodkar 74* (85); Amol Shinde 2/28 (10 overs)	Fort Maidan, Palakkad; Umpires: Sadanand Viswanath and G. A. Pratapkumar
Goa won the toss and elected to field.; Points : Goa 5; Hyderabad -1				Fort Maidan, Palakkad; Umpires: Sadanand Viswanath and G. A. Pratapkumar

16 February 2011	Hyderabad; 120 (34.4 overs)	v	Karnataka; 121/2 (33.2 overs)	Karnataka won by 8 wickets
Scorecard	Hyderabad; 120 (34.4 overs)	v	Karnataka; 121/2 (33.2 overs)	Fort Maidan, Palakkad; Umpires: Sadanand Viswanath and Sadashiv Iyer
Scorecard	Habeeb Ahmed 31 (47); Vinay Kumar 3/18 (7.4 overs)		Ganesh Satish 61* (99); Pagadala Naidu 2/48 (10 overs)	Fort Maidan, Palakkad; Umpires: Sadanand Viswanath and Sadashiv Iyer
Karnataka won the toss and elected to field.; Habeeb Ahmed (Hyderabad) made his List-A debut.; Points : Karnataka 5; Hyderabad -1				Fort Maidan, Palakkad; Umpires: Sadanand Viswanath and Sadashiv Iyer

18 February 2011	Tamil Nadu; 376/4 (50 overs)	v	Hyderabad; 288/7 (50 overs)	Tamil Nadu won by 88 runs
Scorecard	Tamil Nadu; 376/4 (50 overs)	v	Hyderabad; 288/7 (50 overs)	Perinthalmanna Cricket Stadium, Perinthalmanna, Malappuram; Umpires: Sadanand Viswanath and Salemohammad Yusuf
Scorecard	Dinesh Karthik 154* (83); Vivek Krishna 2/66 (10 overs)		Dwaraka Ravi Teja 119 (131); Yo Mahesh 3/35 (8 overs)	Perinthalmanna Cricket Stadium, Perinthalmanna, Malappuram; Umpires: Sadanand Viswanath and Salemohammad Yusuf
Hyderabad won the toss and elected to field.; Vivek Krishna (Hyderabad) made his List A debut.; Points : Tamil Nadu 5; Hyderabad -1				Perinthalmanna Cricket Stadium, Perinthalmanna, Malappuram; Umpires: Sadanand Viswanath and Salemohammad Yusuf

=== Statistics ===
Most runs

Player	Mat	Inns	Runs	Ave	SR	HS	100	50
Dwaraka Ravi Teja	5	5	249	49.80	69.35	119	1	1
Akshath Reddy	5	5	140	28.00	73.29	86	0	1
Bavanaka Sandeep	5	5	81	20.25	71.68	32*	0	0

- Source: ESPNcricinfo

Most wickets

Player	Mat	Inns	Wkts	Ave	Econ	BBI	SR	4WI	5WI
Amol Shinde	5	5	8	25.12	4.78	4/41	31.5	1	0
Pragyan Ojha	5	5	5	39.40	4.26	3/34	55.4	0	0
Pagadala Naidu	5	5	4	40.25	4.47	2/31	54.0	0	0

- Source: ESPNcricinfo

== See also ==
Hyderabad cricket team
Hyderabad Cricket Association
