= 2009–10 Hyderabad C.A. season =

Indian cricket team season

Hyderabad C.A.
2009–10 season
- Coach: Venkatapathy Raju
- Captain: Arjun Yadav
- Ground(s): Rajiv Gandhi International Cricket Stadium, Hyderabad (Capacity: 55,000)
- Syed Mushtaq Ali Trophy: Runners-up
- Ranji Trophy: Super Group A (8th) (Relegated)
- Vijay Hazare Trophy: South Zone (5th)

The 2009–10 season is Hyderabad cricket team's 76th competitive season. The Hyderabad cricket team is senior men's domestic cricket team based in the city of Hyderabad, India, run by the Hyderabad Cricket Association. They represent the region of Telangana in the state of Andhra Pradesh in domestic competitions.

== Competition overview ==
Category	Competition	Format	First match	Last match	Final position	Pld	W	L	D / T / NR	Win %
Senior men's	Syed Mushtaq Ali Trophy	Twenty20 cricket	25 September 2009	16 March 2010	Runners-up	8	3	1	4	37.5%
Senior men's	Ranji Trophy	First-class cricket	3 November 2009	15 December 2009	Relegated to Plate League	7	0	0	7	0%
Senior men's	Vijay Hazare Trophy	List A cricket	10 February 2010	16 February 2010	Zonal Stage	5	1	4	0	20%

== Squads ==
- Head Coach : Venkatapathy Raju
- Fielding Coach : Noel David

Syed Mushtaq Ali Trophy	Ranji Trophy	Vijay Hazare Trophy
Arjun Yadav (c); Abhinav Kumar (wk); Alfred Absolem; Mungala Arjun; Ashish Reddy; Ibrahim Khaleel (wk); Pragyan Ojha; Anoop Pai; Paramveer Singh; Dwaraka Ravi Teja; Ambati Rayudu; Doddapaneni Rushi Raj; Amol Shinde; Tirumalasetti Suman; Benjamin Thomas; Ashwin Yadav	Arjun Yadav (c); Lalith Mohan; Mohammed Khader; Abhinav Kumar; Alfred Absolem; Anirudh Singh; Mungala Arjun; Ibrahim Khaleel (wk); Anoop Pai; Syed Quadri; Dwaraka Ravi Teja; Ambati Rayudu; Doddapaneni Rushi Raj; Tirumalasetti Suman; Ashwin Yadav; Sarvesh Kumar	Arjun Yadav (c); Abhinav Kumar (wk); Alfred Absolem; Anirudh Singh; Mungala Arjun; Ashish Reddy; Akash Bhandari; Neeraj Bist; Syed Quadri; Dwaraka Ravi Teja; Ambati Rayudu; Akshath Reddy; Amol Shinde; Benjamin Thomas; Ashwin Yadav

Rayudu, Anirudh and Absolem returned from the Indian Cricket League to play for the Hyderabad while Raju replaced Kanwaljit Singh as the Hyderabad coach ahead of the 2009–10 season.

Irani Cup

Ojha got selected to the Rest of India squad for the 2009 Irani Cup, a first-class cricket competition in India.

Duleep Trophy

Absolem and Abhinav got selected to the South Zone squad for the 2009-10 Duleep Trophy, a first-class cricket tournament in India.

Deodhar Trophy

Ojha and Rayudu got selected to the South Zone squad for the 2009-10 Deodhar Trophy, a List-A cricket competition in India.

Indian Premier League

The local franchise, Deccan Chargers included Ashish and Anirudh to their squad and retained Arjun Yadav, Ravi Teja, Laxman, Ojha and Suman while the Mumbai Indians added Rayudu and the Rajasthan Royals added Quadri for the 2010 Indian Premier League, a professional Twenty20 cricket league in India.

== Syed Mushtaq Ali Trophy ==
The Hyderabad team, led by Arjun Yadav, began their campaign in the maiden edition of the Syed Mushtaq Ali Trophy, a Twenty20 tournament in India, with a win against Andhra at Visakhapatnam on 25 September 2009. The half-centuries from Ambati Rayudu and Abhinav Kumar helped the Hyderabad reach a total of 176 while the couple of wickets from Mungala Arjun and Pragyan Ojha helped them to overcome the unbeaten half-century from Gnaneswara Rao to win the match over the Andhra by 10 runs. The rest of the Hyderabad's South Zone matches were washed out due to the incessant rains at Visakhapatnam which led them to finish inside top-2 in the South Zone to advance to the knockout stage with a win and four no-results. In the quarterfinal, the Mumbai had posted a strong total of 181 with the help of an unbeaten half-century from Siddharth Chitnis and a 24-ball 46 from Paul Valthaty but an unbeaten century from Akshath Reddy along with some useful contributions from Anoop Pai and Danny Dereck Prince eased the chase for the Hyderabad as they defeated the Mumbai with seven wickets to spare. The Hyderabad reached the final of the tournament with the help from Vivek Krishna's four-wicket haul and the collective contribution from their batsmen as they easily chased the Delhi's target of 158 with five wickets to spare. The Hyderabad batsmen faltered while chasing in the low-scoring final as they were troubled by the Maharashtra opening bowlers, Samad Fallah and Kishor Bhikane and were bowled out for 100 to end the tournament as the Runners-up. Earlier, the Hyderabad troubled the Maharashtra batsmen with three-wicket hauls from Hanuma Vihari and Akash Bhandari but the useful contributions from Rohit Motwani and Digambar Waghmare helped the Maharashtra reach the total of 119 which proved to be enough in the end as they won the match by 19 runs.

=== Points Table ===
South Zone

Team	Pld	W	L	T	NR	Pts	NRR
Tamil Nadu	5	2	0	0	3	14	+1.622
Hyderabad	5	1	0	0	4	12	+0.500
Karnataka	5	1	1	0	3	10	+0.452
Goa	5	1	2	0	2	8	-0.315
Andhra	5	1	2	0	2	8	-0.344
Kerala	5	0	1	0	4	8	-2.450

- Top two teams advanced to knockout stage.
- Points Classification : 4 for Win; 2 for Tie/No-Result; 0 for Loss

=== Knockout stage ===
Pre-Quarterfinals
NZ2	Himachal Pradesh	159/7 (20 overs)
EZ1	Jharkhand	148/4 (20 overs)
CZ2	Railways	155/7 (20 overs)
EZ2	Assam	156/3 (19.1 overs)

Quarterfinals
NZ2	Himachal Pradesh	152/6 (20 overs)
SZ1	Tamil Nadu	158/7 (19.4 overs)
CZ1	Madhya Pradesh	120 (20 overs)
WZ2	Maharashtra	123/4 (16 overs)
WZ1	Mumbai	181/7 (20 overs)
SZ2	Hyderabad	183/3 (19 overs)
NZ1	Delhi	170/5 (20 overs)
EZ2	Assam	135 (17.4 overs)

Semifinals
SZ1	Tamil Nadu	153/5 (20 overs)
WZ2	Maharashtra	154/7 (19.4 overs)
SZ2	Hyderabad	158/5 (19 overs)
NZ1	Delhi	157/8 (20 overs)

Final
WZ2	Maharashtra	119 (18.4 overs)
SZ2	Hyderabad	100 (20 overs)

=== Matches ===
Zonal Stage

25 September 2009	Hyderabad; 176/5 (20 overs)	v	Andhra; 166/7 (20 overs)	Hyderabad won by 10 runs
Scorecard	Hyderabad; 176/5 (20 overs)	v	Andhra; 166/7 (20 overs)	Dr. Y.S. Rajasekhara Reddy ACA-VDCA Cricket Stadium, Visakhapatnam; Umpires: K. N. Ananthapadmanabhan and G. A. Pratapkumar
Scorecard	Abhinav Kumar 55* (27); Shankara Rao 2/33 (4 overs)		Gnaneshwara Rao 71* (41); Pragyan Ojha 2/24 (4 overs)	Dr. Y.S. Rajasekhara Reddy ACA-VDCA Cricket Stadium, Visakhapatnam; Umpires: K. N. Ananthapadmanabhan and G. A. Pratapkumar
Andhra won the toss and elected to field.; A Rakesh, Deepak Kumar, Siva Kumar (Andhra); Anoop Pai, Abhinav Kumar and Ashish Reddy (Hyderabad) all made their T20 debuts.				Dr. Y.S. Rajasekhara Reddy ACA-VDCA Cricket Stadium, Visakhapatnam; Umpires: K. N. Ananthapadmanabhan and G. A. Pratapkumar

26 September 2009	Hyderabad	v	Kerala	Match Abandoned
Scorecard	Hyderabad	v	Kerala	Dr. Y.S. Rajasekhara Reddy ACA-VDCA Cricket Stadium, Visakhapatnam; Umpires: Ravi Subramanian and Sundaram Ravi
No toss.				Dr. Y.S. Rajasekhara Reddy ACA-VDCA Cricket Stadium, Visakhapatnam; Umpires: Ravi Subramanian and Sundaram Ravi

27 September 2009	Hyderabad	v	Tamil Nadu	Match Abandoned
Scorecard	Hyderabad	v	Tamil Nadu	Hindustan Zinc Limited Ground, Visakhapatnam; Umpires: Ravi Subramanian and K. N. Ananthapadmanabhan
No toss.				Hindustan Zinc Limited Ground, Visakhapatnam; Umpires: Ravi Subramanian and K. N. Ananthapadmanabhan

29 September 2009	Goa	v	Hyderabad	Match Abandoned
Scorecard	Goa	v	Hyderabad	Dr. Y.S. Rajasekhara Reddy ACA-VDCA Cricket Stadium, Visakhapatnam; Umpires: Sadashiv Iyer and Jayaraman Madanagopal
No toss.				Dr. Y.S. Rajasekhara Reddy ACA-VDCA Cricket Stadium, Visakhapatnam; Umpires: Sadashiv Iyer and Jayaraman Madanagopal

30 September 2009	Hyderabad	v	Karnataka	Match Abandoned
Scorecard	Hyderabad	v	Karnataka	Dr. Y.S. Rajasekhara Reddy ACA-VDCA Cricket Stadium, Visakhapatnam; Umpires: Jayaraman Madanagopal and Krishnaraj Srinath
No toss.				Dr. Y.S. Rajasekhara Reddy ACA-VDCA Cricket Stadium, Visakhapatnam; Umpires: Jayaraman Madanagopal and Krishnaraj Srinath

Quarter-final

13 March 2010	Mumbai; 181/7 (20 overs)	v	Hyderabad; 183/3 (19 overs)	Hyderabad won by 7 wickets
Scorecard	Mumbai; 181/7 (20 overs)	v	Hyderabad; 183/3 (19 overs)	Holkar Cricket Stadium, Indore; Umpires: Bhanu Prakash and Yeshwant Barde
Scorecard	Siddharth Chitnis 89* (36); Akash Bhandari 2/16 (4 overs)		Akshath Reddy 105* (54); Siddharth Chitnis 1/24 (2 overs)	Holkar Cricket Stadium, Indore; Umpires: Bhanu Prakash and Yeshwant Barde
Mumbai won the toss and elected to bat.; Danny Dereck Prince, Akshath Reddy, Neeraj Bist, Pagadala Niranjan, Akash Bhandari, Pagadala Naidu, Vivek Krishna, Abdul Basheer (Hyderabad); Sushant Marathe, Suryakumar Yadav, Omkar Gurav, Gaurav Jathar and Usman Malvi (Mumbai) all made their T20 debuts.				Holkar Cricket Stadium, Indore; Umpires: Bhanu Prakash and Yeshwant Barde

Semi-final

15 March 2010	Delhi; 157/8 (20 overs)	v	Hyderabad; 158/5 (19 overs)	Hyderabad won by 5 wickets
Scorecard	Delhi; 157/8 (20 overs)	v	Hyderabad; 158/5 (19 overs)	Holkar Cricket Stadium, Indore; Umpires: Suhas Phadkar and Belur Ravi
Scorecard	Farman Ahmed 54 (38); Vivek Krishna 4/25 (4 overs)		Akshath Reddy 33 (30); Chetanya Nanda 1/22 (3 overs)	Holkar Cricket Stadium, Indore; Umpires: Suhas Phadkar and Belur Ravi
Delhi won the toss and elected to bat.; Pravesh Chikara (Delhi); Hanuma Vihari (Hyderabad) all made their T20 debuts.				Holkar Cricket Stadium, Indore; Umpires: Suhas Phadkar and Belur Ravi

Final

16 March 2010	Maharashtra; 119 (18.4 overs)	v	Hyderabad; 100 (20 overs)	Maharashtra won by 19 runs
Scorecard	Maharashtra; 119 (18.4 overs)	v	Hyderabad; 100 (20 overs)	Holkar Cricket Stadium, Indore; Umpires: Suhas Phadkar and Belur Ravi
Scorecard	Digambar Waghmare 29 (25); Akash Bhandari 3/25 (3.4 overs)		Anoop Pai 23 (35); Samad Fallah 4/12 (4 overs)	Holkar Cricket Stadium, Indore; Umpires: Suhas Phadkar and Belur Ravi
Hyderabad won the toss and elected to field.				Holkar Cricket Stadium, Indore; Umpires: Suhas Phadkar and Belur Ravi

=== Statistics ===
Most runs

Player	Mat	Inns	Runs	Ave	SR	HS	100	50
Akshath Reddy	3	3	139	69.50	159.77	105*	1	0
Anoop Pai	4	4	92	23.00	106.97	31	0	0
Abhinav Kumar	1	1	55	–	203.70	55*	0	1

- Source: ESPNcricinfo

Most wickets

Player	Mat	Inns	Wkts	Ave	Econ	BBI	SR	4WI	5WI
Vivek Krishna	3	2	5	10.20	6.37	4/25	9.6	1	0
Akash Bhandari	3	3	5	12.20	5.22	3/25	14.0	0	0
Amol Shinde	4	4	4	26.50	7.57	2/12	21.0	0	0

- Source: ESPNcricinfo

== Ranji Trophy ==
The Hyderabad team, led by V. V. S. Laxman, began their campaign in the Ranji Trophy, the premier first-class cricket tournament in India, with a draw against the Himachal Pradesh at Hyderabad on 3 November 2009. After the second match, Laxman was fined 20% of his match fee while rest of his team-mates were fined 10% of their match fee for the slow over-rate during the Punjab's second innings. Arjun Yadav led the team after two matches as Laxman was selected for the Sri Lanka tour of India. They finished last in Group A of the Super League with no wins, no losses and seven draws and got relegated for the first-time ever to the Plate League for the 2010–11 Ranji Trophy.

=== Points Table ===
Super League Group A

Team	Pld	W	L	D	A	Pts	Q
Tamil Nadu	7	2	0	5	0	26	1.484
Punjab	7	2	1	4	0	19	1.018
Mumbai	7	1	0	6	0	19	1.646
Railways	7	1	0	6	0	14	1.223
Orissa	7	0	1	6	0	12	0.857
Himachal Pradesh	7	1	3	3	0	10	0.875
Gujarat	7	1	3	3	0	10	0.770
Hyderabad	7	0	0	7	0	7	0.624

- Top three teams advanced to knockout stage.
- Bottom team relegated to Plate League for 2010–11 Ranji Trophy.
- Points system : Win by an innings or 10 wickets = 6, Win = 5, Draw with first innings lead = 3, Draw with first innings deficit = 1, No Result = 1, Loss = 0.

=== Matches ===
Group Stage

3–6 November 2009	Hyderabad	v	Himachal Pradesh	Match Drawn Himachal Pradesh took first innings lead
Scorecard	328 (118.3 overs); Abhinav Kumar 73 (199); Vikramjeet Malik 4/67 (31.3 overs)		350 (115.1 overs); Paras Dogra 123 (223); Alfred Absolem 4/95 (29 overs)	Gymkhana Ground, Hyderabad; Umpires: K. N. Ananthapadmanabhan and Ulhas Gandhe
Scorecard	189 (77 overs); Tirumalasetti Suman 46 (76); Ashok Thakur 5/22 (14 overs)		136/8 (41 overs); Bhavin Thakkar 55 (82); Pragyan Ojha 5/52 (18 overs)	Gymkhana Ground, Hyderabad; Umpires: K. N. Ananthapadmanabhan and Ulhas Gandhe
Hyderabad won the toss and elected to bat.

10–13 November 2009	Punjab	v	Hyderabad	Match Drawn Punjab took first innings lead
Scorecard	221 (76.5 overs); Ravi Inder Singh 63 (112); Mungala Arjun 6/47 (19 overs)		193 (62.5 overs); Syed Quadri 73* (125); Love Ablish 4/70 (18.5 overs)	Punjab Cricket Association IS Bindra Stadium, Mohali; Umpires: Bhoopinder Bhatti and Sadashiv Iyer
Scorecard	307/9d (108 overs); Vishwas Bhalla 116* (240); Mohammed Khader 5/101 (35 overs)		254/7 (95 overs); Arjun Yadav 57* (141); Harmeet Singh Bansal 2/43 (19 overs)	Punjab Cricket Association IS Bindra Stadium, Mohali; Umpires: Bhoopinder Bhatti and Sadashiv Iyer
Hyderabad won the toss and elected to field.; Vishwas Bhalla (Punjab) made his first-class debut.

17–20 November 2009	Hyderabad	v	Gujarat	Match Drawn Gujarat took first innings lead
Scorecard	236 (115.3 overs); Anirudh Singh 61* (248); Siddharth Trivedi 5/39 (25.2 overs)		536 (166.3 overs); Rujul Bhatt 186 (250); Alfred Absolem 3/118 (33 overs)	Rajiv Gandhi International Stadium, Hyderabad; Umpires: Shavir Tarapore and Sundaram Ravi
Scorecard	2/0 (2 overs)			Rajiv Gandhi International Stadium, Hyderabad; Umpires: Shavir Tarapore and Sundaram Ravi
Hyderabad won the toss and elected to bat.; Rikin Chauhan (Gujarat) made his first-class debut.

24–27 November 2009	Orissa	v	Hyderabad	Match Drawn Orissa took first innings lead
Scorecard	276 (114.1 overs); Pravanjan Mullick 77 (190); Mungala Arjun 4/52 (25 overs)		199 (83.3 overs); Anirudh Singh 45 (141); Debashish Mohanty 4/48 (22.3 overs)	Rajiv Gandhi International Stadium, Hyderabad; Umpires: SM Raju and AY Gokhale
Scorecard	243/5d (85.4 overs); Rakesh Mohanty 70* (182); Mohammed Khader 2/70 (20 overs)		205/9 (64 overs); Anirudh Singh 74* (135); Dhiraj Singh 4/46 (16 overs)	Rajiv Gandhi International Stadium, Hyderabad; Umpires: SM Raju and AY Gokhale
Hyderabad won the toss and elected to field.

1–4 December 2009	Hyderabad	v	Mumbai	Match Drawn Mumbai took first innings lead
Scorecard	266 (110.2 overs); Syed Quadri 76* (188); Ajit Agarkar 3/44 (25 overs)		521/2d (128 overs); Ajinkya Rahane 265* (382); Mungala Arjun 2/91 (26 overs)	Rajiv Gandhi International Stadium, Hyderabad; Umpires: Vineet Kulkarni
Scorecard	276/6 (119 overs); Ambati Rayudu 79 (153); Iqbal Abdulla 3/72 (33 overs)			Rajiv Gandhi International Stadium, Hyderabad; Umpires: Vineet Kulkarni
Hyderabad won the toss and elected to bat.

8–11 December 2009	Railways	v	Hyderabad	Match Drawn Railways took first innings lead
Scorecard	305 (131 overs); Yere Goud 79 (232); Alfred Absolem 5/89 (28 overs)		303 (122.5 overs); Ambati Rayudu 73 (150); Sanjay Bangar 4/91 (48.5 overs)	Rajiv Gandhi International Stadium, Hyderabad; Umpires: Ganesh Iyer and Seetharam Prabhu
Scorecard	363/5d (81.3 overs); Tejinder Pal Singh 100* (105); Mohammed Khader 3/65 (17 overs)		0/0 (0 overs)	Rajiv Gandhi International Stadium, Hyderabad; Umpires: Ganesh Iyer and Seetharam Prabhu
Hyderabad won the toss and elected to field.; Sarvesh Kumar (Hyderabad) made his first-class debut.

15–18 December 2009	Hyderabad	v	Tamil Nadu	Match Drawn Tamil Nadu took first innings lead
Scorecard	347 (118.5 overs); Ambati Rayudu 106 (152); Abhinav Mukund 2/42 (11.5 overs)		785 (192.3 overs); Abhinav Mukund 257 (422); Alfred Absolem 5/114 (34 overs)	Rajiv Gandhi International Stadium, Hyderabad; Umpires: Pashchim Pathak and Belur Ravi
Scorecard	148/2 (27 overs); Abhinav Kumar 103* (92); Srikkanth Anirudha 1/40 (9 overs)			Rajiv Gandhi International Stadium, Hyderabad; Umpires: Pashchim Pathak and Belur Ravi
Tamil Nadu won the toss and elected to field.; Rangaraj Sutesh (Tamil Nadu) made his first-class debut.

=== Statistics ===
Most runs

Player	Mat	Inns	Runs	Ave	SR	HS	100	50
Ambati Rayudu	7	11	473	43.00	51.41	106	1	3
Syed Quadri	7	11	376	47.00	45.24	76*	0	3
Abhinav Kumar	7	12	355	32.27	51.44	103*	1	1

- Source: ESPNcricinfo

Most wickets

Player	Mat	Inns	Wkts	Ave	Econ	BBI	SR	5WI	10WM
Alfred Absolem	6	10	26	28.34	3.03	5/89	56.0	2	0
Mungala Arjun	7	11	21	30.57	2.92	6/47	62.8	1	0
Mohammed Khader	5	8	18	33.33	2.96	5/101	67.5	1	0

- Source: ESPNcricinfo

== Vijay Hazare Trophy ==
The Hyderabad team, led by Arjun Yadav, began their campaign in the Vijay Hazare Trophy, a List-A cricket tournament in India, with a win against the Andhra at Chennai on 10 February 2010. The Hyderabad bowlers started brightly removing the Andhra top-order cheaply but Siva Kumar's unbeaten knock of 67 in 41 balls in the end helped the Andhra post 201 in 50 overs. After surviving early scare of losing two quick wickets, Dwaraka Ravi Teja and Anirudh Singh struck half-centuries before Doddapaneni Kalyankrishna caused the middle-order collapse for Hyderabad. However, Amol Shinde and Alfred Absolem helped the Hyderabad complete the chase in the penultimate over. In the second match, the centuries from both openers, Abhishek Hegde and VA Jagadeesh and a quick knock of 88 in 29 balls from Raiphi Gomez that includes 34 runs in the last over off Ravi Teja helped the Kerala post a mammoth total 358 in 50 overs. Ravi Teja scored a century in reply for the Hyderabad but no support on the other end apart from Ambati Rayudu's 48 forced the Hyderabad lose by 55 runs. The Hyderabad's collapse at the end after the half-centuries from Rayudu and Akshath Reddy and Anirudha Srikkanth's maiden List-A century for the Tamil Nadu ensured that the Tamil Nadu defeat the Hyderabad by eight wickets in the third match. In the fourth match, the century from Akshath and the half-centuries from Rayudu and Neeraj Bist helped the Hyderabad post 310 in 50 overs but Amit Yadav's maiden century and collective effort from the rest ensured the Goa chase the target in the penultimate over. The Hyderabad got the good start in the chase of 318 in their final zonal match with 54 from Rayudu and 40 from Ravi Teja but the Karnataka spinners derailed their chase in the middle bowling the Hyderabad out for 236 though there was Bist's unbeaten knock of 70 at the end. Earlier, Karnataka posted a 300-plus score, thanks to Robin Uthappa's 51 at the start and C. M. Gautam's unbeaten knock of 68. This loss eliminated the Hyderabad from the tournament as they finished fifth in the South Zone and failed to qualify for the knockout stage with a win and four losses.

=== Points Table ===
South Zone

Team	Pld	W	L	T	NR	Pts	NRR
Tamil Nadu	5	5	0	0	0	23	+1.249
Karnataka	5	4	1	0	0	20	+1.247
Goa	5	3	2	0	0	12	+0.020
Kerala	5	2	3	0	0	5	-0.838
Hyderabad	5	1	4	0	0	2	-0.840
Andhra	5	0	5	0	0	-2	-0.669

- Top two teams advanced to knockout stage.

=== Matches ===
Zonal Stage

10 February 2010	Andhra; 201/8 (50 overs)	v	Hyderabad; 203/8 (48.4 overs)	Hyderabad won by 2 wickets
Scorecard	Andhra; 201/8 (50 overs)	v	Hyderabad; 203/8 (48.4 overs)	MRF Pachyappas Ground, Chennai; Umpires: Ravi Subramanian and Yeshwant Barde
Scorecard	Siva Kumar 67* (42); Alfred Absolem 3/53 (10 overs)		Dwaraka Ravi Teja 67 (88); Siva Kumar 3/53 (10 overs)	MRF Pachyappas Ground, Chennai; Umpires: Ravi Subramanian and Yeshwant Barde
Hyderabad won the toss and elected to field.; Vemu Lenin (Andhra); Pagadala Naidu (Hyderabad) all made their List-A debuts.; Points : Hyderabad 4; Andhra 0				MRF Pachyappas Ground, Chennai; Umpires: Ravi Subramanian and Yeshwant Barde

11 February 2010	Kerala; 358/3 (50 overs)	v	Hyderabad; 303 (47.3 overs)	Kerala won by 55 runs
Scorecard	Kerala; 358/3 (50 overs)	v	Hyderabad; 303 (47.3 overs)	Chemplast Cricket Ground, Chennai; Umpires: Ravi Subramanian and Yeshwant Barde
Scorecard	Abhishek Hegde 121 (127); Amol Shinde 2/46 (10 overs)		Dwaraka Ravi Teja 131 (128); Prasanth Parameswaran 3/56 (10 overs)	Chemplast Cricket Ground, Chennai; Umpires: Ravi Subramanian and Yeshwant Barde
Hyderabad won the toss and elected to field.; Akash Bhandari (Hyderabad); Kanakkatharaparambu Sreejith (Kerala) all made their List-A debuts.; Points : Kerala 4; Hyderabad 0				Chemplast Cricket Ground, Chennai; Umpires: Ravi Subramanian and Yeshwant Barde

13 February 2010	Hyderabad; 250 (48.1 overs)	v	Tamil Nadu; 251/2 (37.5 overs)	Tamil Nadu won by 8 wickets
Scorecard	Hyderabad; 250 (48.1 overs)	v	Tamil Nadu; 251/2 (37.5 overs)	Guru Nanak College Ground, Chennai; Umpires: Bhanu Prakash and Subramaniam Visawanth
Scorecard	Akshath Reddy 77 (109); C. Ganapathy 3/41 (9 overs)		Srikkanth Anirudha 134 (128); Akash Bhandari 1/45 (6 overs)	Guru Nanak College Ground, Chennai; Umpires: Bhanu Prakash and Subramaniam Visawanth
Tamil Nadu won the toss and elected to field.; Akshath Reddy (Hyderabad) made his List A debut.; Points : Tamil Nadu 5; Hyderabad -1				Guru Nanak College Ground, Chennai; Umpires: Bhanu Prakash and Subramaniam Visawanth

14 February 2010	Hyderabad; 310/7 (50 overs)	v	Goa; 311/8 (48.5 overs)	Goa won by 2 wickets
Scorecard	Hyderabad; 310/7 (50 overs)	v	Goa; 311/8 (48.5 overs)	Guru Nanak College Ground, Chennai; Umpires: Pradeep Kumar and Chirra Ravikanthreddy
Scorecard	Akshath Reddy 121 (117); Saurabh Bandekar 3/45 (9 overs)		Amit Yadav 119 (95); Amol Shinde 3/55 (10 overs)	Guru Nanak College Ground, Chennai; Umpires: Pradeep Kumar and Chirra Ravikanthreddy
Hyderabad won the toss and elected to bat.; Benjamin Thomas and Neeraj Bist (Hyderabad) made their List-A debuts.; Points : Goa 4; Hyderabad 0				Guru Nanak College Ground, Chennai; Umpires: Pradeep Kumar and Chirra Ravikanthreddy

16 February 2010	Karnataka; 317/7 (50 overs)	v	Hyderabad; 236 (48 overs)	Karnataka won by 81 runs
Scorecard	Karnataka; 317/7 (50 overs)	v	Hyderabad; 236 (48 overs)	Central Polytechnic India Pistons Ground, Chennai; Umpires: Chirra Ravikanthreddy and Ramesh Kumar
Scorecard	C. M. Gautam 68* (71); Ashish Reddy 2/36 (5 overs)		Neeraj Bist 70* (88); Rajoo Bhatkal 2/31 (6 overs)	Central Polytechnic India Pistons Ground, Chennai; Umpires: Chirra Ravikanthreddy and Ramesh Kumar
Hyderabad won the toss and elected to field.; K. L. Rahul, Ryan Ninan and S. L. Akshay (Karnataka) made their List-A debuts.; Points : Karnataka 5; Hyderabad -1				Central Polytechnic India Pistons Ground, Chennai; Umpires: Chirra Ravikanthreddy and Ramesh Kumar

=== Statistics ===
Most runs

Player	Mat	Inns	Runs	Ave	SR	HS	100	50
Dwaraka Ravi Teja	5	5	288	57.60	85.97	131	1	1
Ambati Rayudu	5	5	250	50.00	102.88	76	0	3
Akshath Reddy	3	3	200	66.66	87.33	121	1	1

- Source: ESPNcricinfo

Most wickets

Player	Mat	Inns	Wkts	Ave	Econ	BBI	SR	4WI	5WI
Amol Shinde	5	5	8	26.12	4.54	3/55	34.5	0	0
Pagadala Naidu	3	3	5	27.60	5.55	2/26	29.8	0	0
Alfred Absolem	4	4	4	56.25	6.61	3/53	51.0	0	0

- Source: ESPNcricinfo

== See also ==
Hyderabad cricket team
Hyderabad Cricket Association
