= 2013–14 Hyderabad C.A. season =

Hyderabad C.A.
2013–14 season
- Coach: Sunil Joshi
- Captain: Akshath Reddy
- Ground(s): Rajiv Gandhi International Cricket Stadium, Hyderabad (Capacity: 55,000)
- Ranji Trophy: Group C (6th)
- Vijay Hazare Trophy: South Zone (4th)
- Syed Mushtaq Ali Trophy: South Zone (4th)

The 2013–14 season is Hyderabad cricket team's 80th competitive season. The Hyderabad cricket team is senior men's domestic cricket team based in the city of Hyderabad, India, run by the Hyderabad Cricket Association. They represent the region of Telangana in the state of Andhra Pradesh in domestic competitions.

== Competition overview ==
Category	Competition	Format	First match	Last match	Final position	Pld	W	L	D / T / NR	Win %
Senior men's	Ranji Trophy	First-class cricket	27 October 2013	30 December 2013	Group Stage	8	1	0	7	12.50%
Senior men's	Vijay Hazare Trophy	List A cricket	27 February 2014	5 March 2014	Zonal Stage	5	2	2	1	40%
Senior men's	Syed Mushtaq Ali Trophy	Twenty20 cricket	1 April 2014	5 April 2014	Zonal Stage	5	2	3	0	40%

== Squads ==
- Head Coach: Sunil Joshi
- Fielding Coach : T Dilip

Ranji Trophy	Vijay Hazare Trophy	Syed Mushtaq Ali Trophy
Akshath Reddy (c); Habeeb Ahmed (wk); Mohammed Khader; Ashish Reddy; Akash Bhandari; Chama Milind; Pragyan Ojha; Syed Quadri; Sundeep Rajan; Ravi Kiran; Dwaraka Ravi Teja; Bavanaka Sandeep; Amol Shinde; Tirumalasetti Suman; Hanuma Vihari; Alfred Absolem	Akshath Reddy (c); Habeeb Ahmed (wk); Alfred Absolem; Balchander Anirudh; Ashish Reddy; Akash Bhandari; Pagadala Naidu; Pragyan Ojha; Rahul Singh; Sundeep Rajan; Ravi Kiran; Dwaraka Ravi Teja; Amol Shinde; Tirumalasetti Suman; Hanuma Vihari	Akshath Reddy (c); Habeeb Ahmed (wk); Balchander Anirudh; Ashish Reddy; Akash Bhandari; Pagadala Naidu; Pragyan Ojha; Rahul Singh; Sundeep Rajan; Ravi Kiran; Dwaraka Ravi Teja; Palakodeti Sairam; Amol Shinde; Vamshi Vardhan Reddy; Hanuma Vihari; Chama Milind

NKP Salve Challenger Trophy

Akshath Reddy got selected for India Blue squad for 2013-14 NKP Salve Challenger Trophy, a List-A cricket tournament in India.

Duleep Trophy

Akshath Reddy and Pragyan Ojha got selected for South Zone squad for 2013-14 Duleep Trophy, a first-class cricket tournament in India.

Deodhar Trophy

Pragyan Ojha got selected for South Zone squad for 2013-14 Deodhar Trophy, a List A cricket competition in India.

Indian Premier League

Mumbai Indians picked Pragyan Ojha while local franchise, Sunrisers Hyderabad picked Ashish Reddy and Chama Milind in the IPL Auction for 2014 Indian Premier League season.

== Ranji Trophy ==
The Hyderabad began their campaign in the Ranji Trophy, the premier first-class cricket tournament in India, with a draw against the Andhra at Hyderabad on 27 October 2013. They finished sixth in Group C with a win, seven draws and no losses.

=== Points Table ===
Group C

Team	Pld	W	L	D	A	Pts	Q
Maharashtra	8	4	0	4	0	35	1.684
Jammu & Kashmir	8	4	2	2	0	28	1.006
Goa	8	4	1	3	0	28	1.005
Himachal Pradesh	8	3	3	2	0	24	1.164
Kerala	8	2	2	4	0	22	0.949
Hyderabad	8	1	0	7	0	19	1.089
Andhra	8	1	2	5	0	14	1.029
Assam	8	1	4	3	0	14	0.805
Tripura	8	0	6	2	0	2	0.573

Top two teams advanced to knockout stage and promoted to Group A / B for 2014–15 Ranji Trophy.

=== Matches ===
Group Stage

27–30 October 2013	Hyderabad	v	Andhra	Match Drawn Hyderabad took first innings lead
Scorecard	221 (76 overs); Hanuma Vihari 75 (165); Syed Shahabuddin 4/45 (20 overs)		185 (84.3 overs); Prasanth Kumar 47 (154); Ashish Reddy 3/49 (18 overs)	Rajiv Gandhi International Stadium, Hyderabad; Umpires: Nitin Menon and Pashchim Pathak
Scorecard	251/6d (98 overs); Hanuma Vihari 68* (222); Marripuri Suresh 3/32 (10 overs)		51/0 (19 overs); K. S. Bharat 30* (61)	Rajiv Gandhi International Stadium, Hyderabad; Umpires: Nitin Menon and Pashchim Pathak
Andhra won the toss and elected to field.; Chama Milind (Hyderabad) and CV Stephen (Andhra) made their first-class debuts.

7–10 November 2013	Assam	v	Hyderabad	Match Drawn Assam took first innings lead
Scorecard	501/9d (197 overs); Gokul Sharma 161* (332); Amol Shinde 3/143 (75 overs)		370 (132.2 overs); Tirumalasetti Suman 126 (170); Tarjinder Singh 2/35 (11 overs)	Dr. Bhupen Hazarika Cricket Stadium, Guwahati; Umpires: Anil Dandekar and Tapan Sharma
Scorecard	20/1 (13 overs); Sibsankar Roy 9* (42)			Dr. Bhupen Hazarika Cricket Stadium, Guwahati; Umpires: Anil Dandekar and Tapan Sharma
Hyderabad won the toss and elected to field.

14–17 November 2013	Maharashtra	v	Hyderabad	Match Drawn
Scorecard	616/9d (163.4 overs); Kedar Jadhav 204 (267); Ravi Kiran 4/116 (34.4 overs)		528/7 (188 overs); Syed Quadri 113* (297); Akshay Darekar 3/149 (59 overs)	Rajiv Gandhi International Cricket Stadium, Hyderabad; Umpires: Nitin Pandit and Virender Sharma
Maharashtra won the toss and elected to bat.

21–24 November 2013	Hyderabad	v	Himachal Pradesh	Hyderabad won by 185 runs
Scorecard	237 (82.3 overs); Tirumalasetti Suman 65 (92); Rishi Dhawan 5/75 (28 overs)		296 (73.1 overs); Bipul Sharma 91 (110); Alfred Absolem 4/88 (21 overs)	Himachal Pradesh Cricket Association Stadium, Dharmasala; Umpires: Amardeep Pathania and Suresh Shastri
Scorecard	355/8d (113.5 overs); Syed Quadri 101* (154); Akshay Chauhan 5/98 (26 overs)		111 (35.5 overs); Paras Dogra 37 (84); Ravi Kiran 4/42 (8.5 overs)	Himachal Pradesh Cricket Association Stadium, Dharmasala; Umpires: Amardeep Pathania and Suresh Shastri
Himachal Pradesh won the toss and elected to field.; Maneik Mohil (Himachal Pradesh) made his first-class debut.

6–9 December 2013	Tripura	v	Hyderabad	Match Drawn
Scorecard	650/8d (190.3 overs); Yogesh Takawale 212 (400); Ravi Kiran 2/110 (32.3 overs)		566/8 (171 overs); Dwaraka Ravi Teja 175 (325); Tushar Saha 5/150 (57 overs)	Rajiv Gandhi International Stadium, Uppal, Hyderabad; Umpires: Anil Dandekar and Ulhas Gandhe
Tripura won the toss and elected to bat.

14–17 December 2013	Hyderabad	v	Goa	Match Drawn Hyderabad took first innings lead
Scorecard	514/6d (171 overs); Hanuma Vihari 201* (378); Buddhadev Mangaldas 2/77 (32 overs)		465 (164.4 overs); Rohit Asnodkar 103 (227); Amol Shinde 3/92 (38.4 overs)	Goa Cricket Association Academy Ground, Porvorim; Umpires: Subrat Das and Virender Sharma
Scorecard	11/0 (5 overs); Akshath Reddy 10* (12)			Goa Cricket Association Academy Ground, Porvorim; Umpires: Subrat Das and Virender Sharma
Hyderabad won the toss and elected to bat.

22–25 December 2013	Hyderabad	v	Jammu & Kashmir	Match Drawn Hyderabad took first innings lead
Scorecard	514/8d (118 overs); Dwaraka Ravi Teja 179 (258); Parvez Rasool 4/99 (25 overs)		299 (93.1 overs); Hardeep Singh 78 (175); Ravi Kiran 5/53 (18.1 overs)	Gandhi Memorial Science College Ground, Jammu; Umpires: Sudhir Asnani and Rohan Pandit
Scorecard			127/1 (42 overs) (f/o); Obaid Haroon 52* (128); Amol Shinde 1/7 (3 overs)	Gandhi Memorial Science College Ground, Jammu; Umpires: Sudhir Asnani and Rohan Pandit
Jammu & Kashmir won the toss and elected to field.

30 December 2013 – 2 January 2014	Hyderabad	v	Kerala	Match Drawn Kerala took first innings lead
Scorecard	201 (74.4 overs); Ashish Reddy 55 (65); Sandeep Warrier 5/38 (19 overs)		264 (83.4 overs); Padmanabhan Prasanth 106 (197); Ravi Kiran 4/81 (19 overs)	Rajiv Gandhi International Stadium, Uppal, Hyderabad; Umpires: Amiesh Saheba and Suresh Shastri
Scorecard	429 (131.2 overs); Hanuma Vihari 145 (296); Nizar Niyas 3/97 (22 overs)		146/2 (47 overs); Nikhilesh Surendran 57 (70); Ravi Kiran 2/29 (9 overs)	Rajiv Gandhi International Stadium, Uppal, Hyderabad; Umpires: Amiesh Saheba and Suresh Shastri
Kerala won the toss and elected to field.

=== Statistics ===
Most runs

Player	Mat	Inns	Runs	Ave	SR	HS	100	50
Hanuma Vihari	8	11	841	93.44	46.85	201*	3	4
Dwaraka Ravi Teja	8	11	694	63.09	55.92	179	2	3
Akshath Reddy	8	12	536	48.72	45.46	149	1	2

- Source: ESPNcricinfo

Most wickets

Player	Mat	Inns	Wkts	Ave	Econ	BBI	SR	5WI	10WM
Ravi Kiran	8	12	30	25.26	3.11	5/53	48.6	1	0
Amol Shinde	7	11	12	54.16	2.58	3/92	125.8	0	0
Alfred Absolem	4	6	9	32.66	3.09	4/88	63.3	0	0

- Source: ESPNcricinfo

== Vijay Hazare Trophy ==
The Hyderabad began their campaign in the Vijay Hazare Trophy, a List A cricket tournament in India, with a win against the Kerala at Alur on 27 February 2014. They finished in fourth in South Zone with two wins, two losses and a tie.

=== Points Table ===
South Zone

Team	Pld	W	L	T	NR	Pts	NRR
Tamil Nadu	5	4	0	0	1	18	+1.870
Karnataka	5	3	1	1	0	14	+1.095
Andhra	5	3	2	0	0	12	-0.405
Hyderabad	5	2	2	1	0	10	-0.335
Kerala	5	1	3	0	1	6	-1.311
Goa	5	0	5	0	0	0	-0.765

- Top two teams advanced to knockout stage.

=== Matches ===
Zonal Stage

27 February 2014	Kerala; 107 (33.5 overs)	v	Hyderabad; 108/1 (30 overs)	Hyderabad won by 9 wickets
Scorecard	Kerala; 107 (33.5 overs)	v	Hyderabad; 108/1 (30 overs)	KSCA Cricket Ground, Alur; Umpires: Vinod Seshan and Amit Bansal
Scorecard	Rohan Prem 47 (74); Pragyan Ojha 4/15 (8 overs)		Tirumalasetti Suman 61* (103); Vinoop Manoharan 1/24 (6 overs)	KSCA Cricket Ground, Alur; Umpires: Vinod Seshan and Amit Bansal
Hyderabad won the toss and elected to field.; Nikhilesh Surendran (Kerala) made his List A debuts.				KSCA Cricket Ground, Alur; Umpires: Vinod Seshan and Amit Bansal

28 February 2014	Karnataka; 248/8 (50 overs)	v	Hyderabad; 248/7 (50 overs)	Match Tied
Scorecard	Karnataka; 248/8 (50 overs)	v	Hyderabad; 248/7 (50 overs)	M. Chinnaswamy Stadium, Bengaluru; Umpires: Vinod Seshan and Sudhir Asnani
Scorecard	Vinay Kumar 47* (50); Alfred Absolem 2/34 (10 overs)		Akshath Reddy 57 (76); Vinay Kumar 5/42 (10 overs)	M. Chinnaswamy Stadium, Bengaluru; Umpires: Vinod Seshan and Sudhir Asnani
Hyderabad won the toss and elected to field.				M. Chinnaswamy Stadium, Bengaluru; Umpires: Vinod Seshan and Sudhir Asnani

2 March 2014	Tamil Nadu; 280/4 (45 overs)	v	Hyderabad; 155 (35.5 overs)	Tamil Nadu won by 125 runs
Scorecard	Tamil Nadu; 280/4 (45 overs)	v	Hyderabad; 155 (35.5 overs)	Aditya Academy Ground, Bengaluru; Umpires: Chandrakanth Mhase and Piyush Khakhar
Scorecard	Baba Aparajith 91 (100); Tirumalasetti Suman 1/21 (4 overs)		Akshath Reddy 42 (62); Lakshmipathy Balaji 3/27 (5.5 overs)	Aditya Academy Ground, Bengaluru; Umpires: Chandrakanth Mhase and Piyush Khakhar
Hyderabad won the toss and elected to field.; Krishnamoorthy Vignesh (Tamil Nadu) made his List-A debut.				Aditya Academy Ground, Bengaluru; Umpires: Chandrakanth Mhase and Piyush Khakhar

3 March 2014	Hyderabad; 166 (47.5 overs)	v	Andhra; 167/4 (40.1 overs)	Andhra won by 6 wickets
Scorecard	Hyderabad; 166 (47.5 overs)	v	Andhra; 167/4 (40.1 overs)	M. Chinnaswamy Stadium, Bengaluru; Umpires: Mukund Mandale and Akshay Marathe
Scorecard	Habeeb Ahmed 44* (49); Dasari Swaroop Kumar 4/21 (4.5 overs)		K. S. Bharat 60 (87); Pragyan Ojha 2/46 (11 overs)	M. Chinnaswamy Stadium, Bengaluru; Umpires: Mukund Mandale and Akshay Marathe
Hyderabad won the toss and elected to bat.				M. Chinnaswamy Stadium, Bengaluru; Umpires: Mukund Mandale and Akshay Marathe

5 March 2014	Goa; 289/7 (50 overs)	v	Hyderabad; 290/9 (49.4 overs)	Hyderabad won by 1 wicket
Scorecard	Goa; 289/7 (50 overs)	v	Hyderabad; 290/9 (49.4 overs)	Aditya Academy Ground, Bengaluru; Umpires: Piyush Khakhar and Nitin Pandit
Scorecard	Sagun Kamat 112 (109); Ravi Kiran 5/53 (12 overs)		Dwaraka Ravi Teja 87 (119); Harshad Hanumant Gadekar 4/73 (11 overs)	Aditya Academy Ground, Bengaluru; Umpires: Piyush Khakhar and Nitin Pandit
Goa won the toss and elected to bat.; Rohan Belekar (Goa) made his List A debut.				Aditya Academy Ground, Bengaluru; Umpires: Piyush Khakhar and Nitin Pandit

=== Statistics ===
Most runs

Player	Mat	Inns	Runs	Ave	SR	HS	100	50
Dwaraka Ravi Teja	5	5	170	42.50	72.34	87	0	1
Ashish Reddy	5	4	162	162.00	129.60	62*	0	2
Hanuma Vihari	5	4	135	33.75	63.98	45	0	0

- Source: ESPNcricinfo

Most wickets

Player	Mat	Inns	Wkts	Ave	Econ	BBI	SR	4WI	5WI
Pragyan Ojha	5	5	8	28.12	4.59	4/15	36.7	1	0
Ravi Kiran	5	5	7	30.71	4.40	5/53	41.8	0	1
Alfred Absolem	3	3	5	19.80	3.80	2/18	31.2	0	0

- Source: ESPNcricinfo

== Syed Mushtaq Ali Trophy ==
The Hyderabad began their campaign in the Syed Mushtaq Ali Trophy, a Twenty20 tournament in India, against the Kerala at Visakhapatnam on 1 April 2014. They finished fourth in South Zone with two wins and three losses.

=== Points Table ===
South Zone

Team	Pld	W	L	T	NR	Pts	NRR
Goa	5	5	0	0	0	20	+2.100
Kerala	5	3	2	0	0	12	+0.725
Tamil Nadu	5	2	3	0	0	8	-0.001
Hyderabad	5	2	3	0	0	8	-0.418
Karnataka	5	2	3	0	0	8	+1.003
Andhra	5	1	4	0	0	4	-1.560

- Top two teams advanced to the Super League.

=== Matches ===
Zonal Stage

1 April 2014	Hyderabad; 179/2 (20 overs)	v	Kerala; 145/9 (20 overs)	Hyderabad won by 34 runs
Scorecard	Hyderabad; 179/2 (20 overs)	v	Kerala; 145/9 (20 overs)	Dr. Y.S. Rajasekhara Reddy ACA-VDCA Cricket Stadium, Visakhapatnam; Umpires: Shaktipada Bhattacharya and Marcus Couto
Scorecard	Dwaraka Ravi Teja 101* (68); Basil Thampi 1/27 (4 overs)		KJ Rakesh 48 (41); Pragyan Ojha 3/21 (4 overs)	Dr. Y.S. Rajasekhara Reddy ACA-VDCA Cricket Stadium, Visakhapatnam; Umpires: Shaktipada Bhattacharya and Marcus Couto
Kerala won the toss and elected to field.; Ravi Kiran (Hyderabad); Basil Thampi and Vinoop Manoharan (Kerala) all made their T20 debuts.				Dr. Y.S. Rajasekhara Reddy ACA-VDCA Cricket Stadium, Visakhapatnam; Umpires: Shaktipada Bhattacharya and Marcus Couto

2 April 2014	Karnataka; 140 (20 overs)	v	Hyderabad; 141/1 (17.3 overs)	Hyderabad won by 9 wickets
Scorecard	Karnataka; 140 (20 overs)	v	Hyderabad; 141/1 (17.3 overs)	Dr. Y.S. Rajasekhara Reddy ACA-VDCA Cricket Stadium, Visakhapatnam; Umpires: Nikhil Patwardhan and Shaktipada Bhattacharya
Scorecard	Robin Uthappa 64 (45); Hanuma Vihari 2/13 (3 overs)		Akshath Reddy 69* (48); Vinay Kumar 1/15 (3 overs)	Dr. Y.S. Rajasekhara Reddy ACA-VDCA Cricket Stadium, Visakhapatnam; Umpires: Nikhil Patwardhan and Shaktipada Bhattacharya
Karnataka won the toss and elected to bat.; Sundeep Rajan (Hyderabad) made his T20 debut.				Dr. Y.S. Rajasekhara Reddy ACA-VDCA Cricket Stadium, Visakhapatnam; Umpires: Nikhil Patwardhan and Shaktipada Bhattacharya

3 April 2014	Tamil Nadu; 139/9 (20 overs)	v	Hyderabad; 109 (18.3 overs)	Tamil Nadu won by 30 runs
Scorecard	Tamil Nadu; 139/9 (20 overs)	v	Hyderabad; 109 (18.3 overs)	Dr. Y.S. Rajasekhara Reddy ACA-VDCA Cricket Stadium, Visakhapatnam; Umpires: Adil Palia and Marcus Couto
Scorecard	Baba Indrajith 37 (31); Ashish Reddy 2/13 (3 overs)		Sundeep Rajan 34 (27); Murthy Prabhu 3/24 (4 overs)	Dr. Y.S. Rajasekhara Reddy ACA-VDCA Cricket Stadium, Visakhapatnam; Umpires: Adil Palia and Marcus Couto
Hyderabad won the toss and elected to field.; Napoleon Einstein (Tamil Nadu) made his T20 debut.				Dr. Y.S. Rajasekhara Reddy ACA-VDCA Cricket Stadium, Visakhapatnam; Umpires: Adil Palia and Marcus Couto

4 April 2014	Hyderabad; 76 (20 overs)	v	Andhra; 77/2 (11.3 overs)	Andhra won by 8 wickets
Scorecard	Hyderabad; 76 (20 overs)	v	Andhra; 77/2 (11.3 overs)	Dr. Y.S. Rajasekhara Reddy ACA-VDCA Cricket Stadium, Visakhapatnam; Umpires: Marcus Couto and Abhijit Bhattacharya
Scorecard	Sundeep Rajan 21 (35); Siva Kumar 4/6 (4 overs)		NJ Sai Krishna 33 (24); Pagadala Naidu 1/17 (3 overs)	Dr. Y.S. Rajasekhara Reddy ACA-VDCA Cricket Stadium, Visakhapatnam; Umpires: Marcus Couto and Abhijit Bhattacharya
Andhra won the toss and elected to field.				Dr. Y.S. Rajasekhara Reddy ACA-VDCA Cricket Stadium, Visakhapatnam; Umpires: Marcus Couto and Abhijit Bhattacharya

5 April 2014	Hyderabad; 149/7 (20 overs)	v	Goa; 151/8 (20 overs)	Goa won by 2 wickets
Scorecard	Hyderabad; 149/7 (20 overs)	v	Goa; 151/8 (20 overs)	Dr. Y.S. Rajasekhara Reddy ACA-VDCA Cricket Stadium, Visakhapatnam; Umpires: Shaktipada Bhattacharya and Adil Palia
Scorecard	Dwaraka Ravi Teja 48 (45); Lakshay Garg 2/24 (4 overs)		Sagun Kamat 56 (44); Ashish Reddy 2/22 (4 overs)	Dr. Y.S. Rajasekhara Reddy ACA-VDCA Cricket Stadium, Visakhapatnam; Umpires: Shaktipada Bhattacharya and Adil Palia
Hyderabad won the toss and elected to bat.; Lakshay Garg (Goa) made his T20 debut.				Dr. Y.S. Rajasekhara Reddy ACA-VDCA Cricket Stadium, Visakhapatnam; Umpires: Shaktipada Bhattacharya and Adil Palia

=== Statistics ===
Most runs

Player	Mat	Inns	Runs	Ave	SR	HS	100	50
Dwaraka Ravi Teja	5	5	157	39.25	121.70	101*	1	0
Hanuma Vihari	5	5	146	36.50	108.14	64*	0	1
Akshath Reddy	5	5	126	31.50	131.25	69*	0	1

- Source: ESPNcricinfo

Most wickets

Player	Mat	Inns	Wkts	Ave	Econ	BBI	SR	4WI	5WI
Ashish Reddy	5	5	9	12.00	6.00	2/13	12.0	0	0
Pragyan Ojha	5	5	6	20.83	6.94	3/21	18.0	0	0
Amol Shinde	2	2	4	14.00	7.00	2/28	12.0	0	0

- Source: ESPNcricinfo

== See also ==
Hyderabad cricket team
Hyderabad Cricket Association
