= 2008–09 Hyderabad C.A. season =

Hyderabad C.A.
2008–09 season
- Coach: Kanwaljit Singh
- Captain: V. V. S. Laxman (FC); Arjun Yadav (LA)
- Ground(s): Rajiv Gandhi International Cricket Stadium, Hyderabad (Capacity: 55,000)
- Ranji Trophy: Super Group A (6th)
- Vijay Hazare Trophy: Quarter-finals

The 2008–09 season is Hyderabad cricket team's 75th competitive season. The Hyderabad cricket team is senior men's domestic cricket team based in the city of Hyderabad, India, run by the Hyderabad Cricket Association. They represent the region of Telangana in the state of Andhra Pradesh in domestic competitions.

== Competition overview ==
Category	Competition	Format	First match	Last match	Final position	Pld	W	L	D/T/NR	Win %
Senior men's	Ranji Trophy	First-class cricket	3 November 2008	18 December 2008	Super League Group Stage	7	0	3	4	0%
Senior men's	Vijay Hazare Trophy	List A cricket	15 February 2009	2 March 2009	Quarter-finals	6	3	3	0	50%

== Squads ==
- Head coach : Kanwaljit Singh

Ranji Trophy	Vijay Hazare Trophy
V. V. S. Laxman (c); Lalith Mohan; Vishal Sharma; Abhinav Kumar (wk); Mungala Arjun; Anoop Pai; Paramveer Singh; Syed Quadri; Dwaraka Ravi Teja; Ronald Rodrigues; Mohammed Shakeer; Shoaib Ahmed; Tirumalasetti Suman; Ashwin Yadav; Arjun Yadav; Doddapaneni Rushi Raj; Shiv Shanker	Arjun Yadav (c); Abhinav Kumar (wk); Mungala Arjun; Ashish Reddy; Anoop Pai; Paramveer Singh; Danny Dereck Prince; Syed Quadri; Dwaraka Ravi Teja; Gautam Reddy; Amol Shinde; Shoaib Ahmed; Tirumalasetti Suman; Vijay Goud; Ashwin Yadav

Kanwaljit Singh replaced Vivek Jaisimha as the Hyderabad coach ahead of the 2008–09 season.

Irani Cup

Laxman and Ojha got selected to the Rest of India squad for the 2008 Irani Cup, a first-class cricket competition in India.

NKP Salve Challenger Trophy

Arjun Yadav got picked to the India Blue squad while Ojha and Abhinav got picked to the India Green squad for the 2008-09 NKP Salve Challenger Trophy, a List-A cricket tournament in India.

Duleep Trophy

Laxman, Ojha, Arjun Yadav and Pai got selected to the South Zone squad for the 2008-09 Duleep Trophy, a first-class cricket tournament in India. Ojha later withdrew from the tournament.

Deodhar Trophy

Pai, Ravi Teja, Shoaib Ahmed and Arjun Yadav got selected to the South Zone squad for the 2008-09 Deodhar Trophy, a List-A cricket competition in India.

Indian Premier League

The local franchise, Deccan Chargers signed Suman, Abhinav and Shoaib Ahmed while retained Laxman, Ojha, Ravi Teja, Sarvesh and Arjun Yadav for the 2009 Indian Premier League, a professional Twenty20 cricket league in India.

== Ranji Trophy ==
The Hyderabad team, led by V. V. S. Laxman, began their campaign in the Ranji Trophy, the premier first-class cricket tournament in India, with a draw against the Orissa at Cuttack on 3 November 2008. Pragyan Ojha was ruled out due to shoulder injury ahead of the match against the Delhi. Laxman was ruled out due to heal injury ahead of their match against the Mumbai and Arjun Yadav led the team in the absence of Laxman. They finished sixth in Group A of the Super League and failed to qualify for the knockout stage with no wins, three losses and four draws.

=== Points Table ===
Super League Group A

Team	Pld	W	L	D	A	Pts	Q
Mumbai	7	5	0	2	0	31	1.741
Gujarat	7	4	1	2	0	28	1.593
Saurashtra	7	3	2	2	0	23	1.401
Delhi	7	2	0	5	0	20	1.094
Punjab	7	2	3	2	0	12	0.800
Hyderabad	7	0	3	4	0	10	0.809
Orissa	7	1	4	2	0	9	0.640
Rajasthan	7	0	4	3	0	3	0.538

- Top three teams advanced to knockout stage.
- Bottom team relegated to Plate League for 2009–10 Ranji Trophy.
- Points system : Win by an innings or 10 wickets = 6, Win = 5, Draw with first innings lead = 3, Draw with first innings deficit = 1, No Result = 1, Loss = 0.

=== Matches ===
Group Stage

3–6 November 2008	Hyderabad	v	Orissa	Match Drawn Hyderabad took first innings lead
Scorecard	296 (118.1 overs); Abhinav Kumar 99* (193); Preetamjit Das 3/59 (21.1 overs)		269 (114.2 overs); Shiv Sunder Das 80 (172); Amol Shinde 3/24 (12 overs)	Barabati Stadium, Cuttack; Umpires: Sanjiva Rao and Suhas Phadkar
Scorecard	263/5 (105 overs); Doddapaneni Rushi Raj 56 (137); Debashish Mohanty 2/24 (10 overs)			Barabati Stadium, Cuttack; Umpires: Sanjiva Rao and Suhas Phadkar
Orissa won the toss and elected to field.; Doddapaneni Rushi Raj (Hyderabad) made his first-class debut.

10–13 November 2008	Hyderabad	v	Delhi	Match Drawn Hyderabad took first innings lead
Scorecard	334 (135.4 overs); Anoop Pai 130 (337); Pradeep Sangwan 4/86 (30 overs)		284 (112.2 overs); Puneet Bisht 78 (173); Ashwin Yadav 6/52 (28.2 overs)	Rajiv Gandhi International Stadium, Hyderabad; Umpires: Sundaram Ravi and Umesh Dubey
Scorecard	230/3 (90 overs); Dwaraka Ravi Teja 113* (260); Mithun Manhas 3/52 (22 overs)			Rajiv Gandhi International Stadium, Hyderabad; Umpires: Sundaram Ravi and Umesh Dubey
Hyderabad won the toss and elected to bat.; Syed Quadri (Hyderabad) made his first-class debut.

16–19 November 2008	Gujarat	v	Hyderabad	Match Drawn Gujarat took first innings lead
Scorecard	520/9d (163.1 overs); Nilesh Modi 250* (440); Tirumalasetti Suman 3/63 (16.1 overs)		225 (81.2 overs); Syed Quadri 57 (87); Siddharth Trivedi 4/44 (22 overs)	Sardar Patel Stadium, Motera, Ahmedabad; Umpires: Vishwas Nerurkar and Milind Pathak
Scorecard			287/7 (106 overs) (f/o); Arjun Yadav 117* (302); Siddharth Trivedi 3/64 (21 overs)	Sardar Patel Stadium, Motera, Ahmedabad; Umpires: Vishwas Nerurkar and Milind Pathak
Gujarat won the toss and elected to bat.

23–26 November 2008	Hyderabad	v	Rajasthan	Match Drawn Hyderabad took first innings lead
Scorecard	553/6d (169.3 overs); V. V. S. Laxman 224 (360); Pankaj Singh 2/111 (33 overs)		405 (161 overs); Robin Bist 136 (374); Ashwin Yadav 4/67 (28 overs)	Rajiv Gandhi International Stadium, Hyderabad; Umpires: Ajith Kumar and K. N. Ananthapadmanabhan
Scorecard	33/0 (10 overs); Dwaraka Ravi Teja 17* (30)			Rajiv Gandhi International Stadium, Hyderabad; Umpires: Ajith Kumar and K. N. Ananthapadmanabhan
Hyderabad won the toss and elected to bat.; Vaibhav Deshpande (Rajasthan) made his first-class debut.

2–5 December 2008	Mumbai	v	Hyderabad	Mumbai won by an innings and 108 runs
Scorecard	602/6d (151.4 overs); Wasim Jaffer 256 (340); Mungala Arjun 4/99 (27 overs)		251 (84 overs); Tirumalasetti Suman 67 (145); Ramesh Powar 5/67 (28 overs)	Bandra Kurla Complex Ground, Mumbai; Umpires: Sundaram Ravi and Krishna Hariharan
Scorecard			243 (57.1 overs) (f/o); Dwaraka Ravi Teja 107 (107); Dhawal Kulkarni 7/50 (16 overs)	Bandra Kurla Complex Ground, Mumbai; Umpires: Sundaram Ravi and Krishna Hariharan
Mumbai won the toss and elected to bat.

12–15 December 2008	Hyderabad	v	Punjab	Punjab won by 9 wickets
Scorecard	355 (112.3 overs); Tirumalasetti Suman 131 (224); Sarabjit Ladda 4/72 (33 overs)		291 (121 overs); Uday Kaul 106 (279); Mungala Arjun 3/54 (26 overs)	Rajiv Gandhi International Stadium, Hyderabad; Umpires: K. N. Ananthapadmanabhan and G. A. Pratapkumar
Scorecard	164 (78.2 overs); Anoop Pai 50 (143); Sarabjit Ladda 5/39 (23 overs)		211/1 (36.2 overs); Ravi Inder Singh 112* (109); Shoaib Ahmed 1/36 (7 overs)	Rajiv Gandhi International Stadium, Hyderabad; Umpires: K. N. Ananthapadmanabhan and G. A. Pratapkumar
Hyderabad won the toss and elected to bat.; Shiv Shanker (Hyderabad); Mayank Sidhana (Punjab) made their first-class debuts.

18–21 December 2008	Saurashtra	v	Hyderabad	Saurashtra won by 105 runs
Scorecard	133 (52.3 overs); Sagar Jogiyani 38 (67); Ashwin Yadav 3/19 (11 overs)		140 (49.1 overs); Dwaraka Ravi Teja 35 (32); Balkrishna Jadeja 6/29 (14 overs)	Madhavrao Scindia Cricket Ground, Rajkot; Umpires: Krishna Hariharan and C. K. Nandan
Scorecard	183 (65 overs); Chirag Pathak 33 (48); Amol Shinde 4/13 (10 overs)		71 (26.5 overs); Mungala Arjun 23 (20); Ravindra Jadeja 7/31 (12.5 overs)	Madhavrao Scindia Cricket Ground, Rajkot; Umpires: Krishna Hariharan and C. K. Nandan
Saurashtra won the toss and elected to bat.

=== Statistics ===
Most runs

Player	Mat	Inns	Runs	Ave	SR	HS	100	50
Anoop Pai	7	13	550	42.30	40.65	130	1	5
Dwaraka Ravi Teja	7	14	456	38.00	57.21	113*	2	1
Tirumalasetti Suman	7	14	426	32.76	47.75	131	1	3

- Source: ESPNcricinfo

Most wickets

Player	Mat	Inns	Wkts	Ave	Econ	BBI	SR	5WI	10WM
Ashwin Yadav	7	9	19	25.52	2.95	6/52	51.7	1	0
Mungala Arjun	7	9	12	37.66	2.72	4/99	83.0	0	0
Shoaib Ahmed	7	9	11	38.09	2.41	3/50	94.5	0	0

- Source: ESPNcricinfo

== Vijay Hazare Trophy ==
The Hyderabad team, led by Arjun Yadav, began their campaign in the Vijay Hazare Trophy, a List-A cricket tournament in India, with a win against the Kerala at Visakhapatnam on 15 February 2009. Robert Fernandez's 83 supported by half-century from Sreekumar Nair helped the Kerala post a competitive total of 247 though they lost five wickets in last ten overs but injury to S. Sreesanth and the half-centuries from Dwaraka Ravi Teja, Anoop Pai and Syed Quadri helped the Hyderabad chase the target with four wickets to spare. In the second match, steady opening partnership between Robin Uthappa and C. M. Gautam and the half-centuries from Manish Pandey and Deepak Chougule helped the Karnataka survive the late collapse off Shoaib Ahmed and post 269 in 50 overs. The Hyderabad started the chase strongly with Tirumalasetti Suman scoring 93 off 86 balls but the seven-wickets between Sunil Joshi and K. P. Appanna in the middle helped the Karnataka defeat the Hyderabad by 50 runs. The Hyderabad suffered second loss in three matches as the centuries from Subramaniam Badrinath and Vidyut Sivaramakrishnan helped the Tamil Nadu post 342 in 50 overs and the early collapse from the Hyderabad top-order led to a 92-run defeat as Shoaib Ahmed's second five-wicket haul in last two matches went in vain. The Hyderabad won their second match in this tournament as the collective batting effort from the batsmen with the half-century form Ravi Teja helped the Hyderabad post 261 in 50 overs while the three-wicket hauls from Shoaib Ahmed and Mungala Arjun restricted Goa to 155 and ensure a 105-run win for the Hyderabad. In the final zonal match, the Andhra were troubled by Shoaib Ahmed as his seven-wicket haul helped the Hyderabad bowl out the Andhra for 130 while an unbeaten half-century from Ravi Teja ensured a six-wicket win for the Hyderabad. This win helped the Hyderabad finish inside top-2 in the South Zone to advance to the knockout stage with three wins and two losses. They were eliminated in the quarter-final where lost to the Baroda by seven wickets. The Hyderabad were bowled out for 167 with the help of four-wicket haul from Ikram Zampawala and the three-wicket haul from Swapnil Singh while the half-centuries from Shailesh Solanki, Azhar Bilakhia and Rakesh Solanki helped the Baroda chase the target in 31 overs.

=== Points Table ===
South Zone

Team	Pld	W	L	T	NR	Pts	NRR
Tamil Nadu	5	5	0	0	0	24	+2.106
Hyderabad	5	3	2	0	0	13	+0.244
Karnataka	5	3	2	0	0	12	+0.279
Andhra	5	2	3	0	0	6	-0.492
Kerala	5	1	4	0	0	3	-0.808
Goa	5	1	4	0	0	2	-1.191

- Top two teams advanced to knockout stage.

=== Knockout stage ===
Pre-Quarterfinals
EZ2	Orissa
SZ1	Tamil Nadu
CZ2	Railways	305/6 (50 overs)
NZ1	Delhi	309/8 (48.3 overs)

Quarterfinals
SZ1	Tamil Nadu	252/9 (50 overs)
WZ1	Mumbai	196 (45.5 overs)
CZ1	Uttar Pradesh	210/8 (50 overs)
NZ2	Himachal Pradesh	176 (42.5 overs)
SZ2	Hyderabad	167 (49.3 overs)
WZ2	Baroda	173/3 (30.2 overs)
EZ1	Bengal	210/8 (46.1 overs)
NZ1	Delhi	209/8 (47 overs)

Semifinals
SZ1	Tamil Nadu	197 (49.5 overs)
CZ1	Uttar Pradesh	162 (44.5 overs)
WZ2	Baroda	146 (40.2 overs)
EZ1	Bengal	227 (49.5 overs)

Final
SZ1	Tamil Nadu	284/6 (50 overs)
EZ1	Bengal	218 (45.2 overs)

=== Matches ===
Zonal Stage

15 February 2009	Kerala; 247 (50 overs)	v	Hyderabad; 248/6 (48.2 overs)	Hyderabad won by 4 wickets
Scorecard	Kerala; 247 (50 overs)	v	Hyderabad; 248/6 (48.2 overs)	Ukku Stadium, Visakhapatnam; Umpires: Nitin Pai and Subramaniam Viswanath
Scorecard	Robert Fernandez 83 (95); Syed Quadri 4/40 (10 overs)		Anoop Pai 60 (66); Prasanth Parameswaran 2/40 (9 overs)	Ukku Stadium, Visakhapatnam; Umpires: Nitin Pai and Subramaniam Viswanath
Kerala won the toss and elected to bat.; Shoaib Ahmed (Hyderabad) made his List-A debut.; Points : Hyderabad 4; Kerala 0				Ukku Stadium, Visakhapatnam; Umpires: Nitin Pai and Subramaniam Viswanath

16 February 2009	Karnataka; 269 (49.4 overs)	v	Hyderabad; 219 (44.3 overs)	Karnataka won by 50 runs
Scorecard	Karnataka; 269 (49.4 overs)	v	Hyderabad; 219 (44.3 overs)	Ukku Stadium, Visakhapatnam; Umpires: Nitin Pai and Subramaniam Viswanath
Scorecard	Manish Pandey 69 (80); Shoaib Ahmed 5/42 (9.4 overs)		Tirumalasetti Suman 93 (86); Sunil Joshi 4/52 (10 overs)	Ukku Stadium, Visakhapatnam; Umpires: Nitin Pai and Subramaniam Viswanath
Karnataka won the toss and elected to bat.; Points : Karnataka 4; Hyderabad 0				Ukku Stadium, Visakhapatnam; Umpires: Nitin Pai and Subramaniam Viswanath

18 February 2009	Tamil Nadu; 342/6 (50 overs)	v	Hyderabad; 250/7 (50 overs)	Tamil Nadu won by 92 runs
Scorecard	Tamil Nadu; 342/6 (50 overs)	v	Hyderabad; 250/7 (50 overs)	Ukku Stadium, Visakhapatnam; Umpires: Puttarangaiah Jayapal and Subramaniam Visawanth
Scorecard	Subramaniam Badrinath 134 (118); Shoaib Ahmed 5/67 (10 overs)		Anoop Pai 64 (97); Rangaraj Suthesh 2/54 (7 overs)	Ukku Stadium, Visakhapatnam; Umpires: Puttarangaiah Jayapal and Subramaniam Visawanth
Tamil Nadu won the toss and elected to bat.; Points : Tamil Nadu 5; Hyderabad -1				Ukku Stadium, Visakhapatnam; Umpires: Puttarangaiah Jayapal and Subramaniam Visawanth

19 February 2009	Hyderabad; 260/8 (50 overs)	v	Goa; 155 (40.3 overs)	Hyderabad won by 105 runs
Scorecard	Hyderabad; 260/8 (50 overs)	v	Goa; 155 (40.3 overs)	Dr. Y.S. Rajasekhara Reddy ACA-VDCA Cricket Stadium, Visakhapatnam; Umpires: Ramesh Kumar and Chirra Ravikanthreddy
Scorecard	Dwaraka Ravi Teja 69 (95); Shadab Jakati 3/52 (10 overs)		Ryan D'Souza 32* (46); Mungala Arjun 3/19 (8 overs)	Dr. Y.S. Rajasekhara Reddy ACA-VDCA Cricket Stadium, Visakhapatnam; Umpires: Ramesh Kumar and Chirra Ravikanthreddy
Goa won the toss and elected to field.; Ashish Reddy (Hyderabad) made his List-A debut.; Points : Hyderabad 5; Goa -1				Dr. Y.S. Rajasekhara Reddy ACA-VDCA Cricket Stadium, Visakhapatnam; Umpires: Ramesh Kumar and Chirra Ravikanthreddy

21 February 2009	Andhra; 130 (41.1 overs)	v	Hyderabad; 133/4 (32.1 overs)	Hyderabad won by 6 wickets
Scorecard	Andhra; 130 (41.1 overs)	v	Hyderabad; 133/4 (32.1 overs)	Dr. Y.S. Rajasekhara Reddy ACA-VDCA Cricket Stadium, Visakhapatnam; Umpires: Pradeep Kumar and R. Sundar
Scorecard	Hemal Watekar 49 (90); Shoaib Ahmed 7/15 (8.1 overs)		Dwaraka Ravi Teja 67* (83); Gnaneshwara Rao 1/10 (2 overs)	Dr. Y.S. Rajasekhara Reddy ACA-VDCA Cricket Stadium, Visakhapatnam; Umpires: Pradeep Kumar and R. Sundar
Hyderabad won the toss and elected to field.; MUB Sriram and Dasari Swaroop Kumar (Andhra) made their List-A debuts.; Points : Hyderabad 5; Andhra -1				Dr. Y.S. Rajasekhara Reddy ACA-VDCA Cricket Stadium, Visakhapatnam; Umpires: Pradeep Kumar and R. Sundar

Quarter-final

2 March 2009	Hyderabad; 167 (49.3 overs)	v	Baroda; 173/3 (30.2 overs)	Baroda won by 7 wickets
Scorecard	Hyderabad; 167 (49.3 overs)	v	Baroda; 173/3 (30.2 overs)	Tripura Institute of Technology Ground, Agartala; Umpires: Sudhir Asnani and Sanjiva Rao
Scorecard	Dwaraka Ravi Teja 77 (137); Ikram Zampawala 4/29 (9.3 overs)		Shailesh Solanki 59 (49); Mungala Arjun 1/21 (4 overs)	Tripura Institute of Technology Ground, Agartala; Umpires: Sudhir Asnani and Sanjiva Rao
Hyderabad won the toss and elected to bat.				Tripura Institute of Technology Ground, Agartala; Umpires: Sudhir Asnani and Sanjiva Rao

=== Statistics ===
Most runs

Player	Mat	Inns	Runs	Ave	SR	HS	100	50
Dwaraka Ravi Teja	6	6	317	63.40	74.23	77	0	4
Anoop Pai	6	6	171	28.50	68.95	64	0	2
Abhinav Kumar	6	5	166	33.20	70.63	58	0	1

- Source: ESPNcricinfo

Most wickets

Player	Mat	Inns	Wkts	Ave	Econ	BBI	SR	4WI	5WI
Shoaib Ahmed	6	6	21	10.52	4.71	7/15	13.3	0	3
Amol Shinde	6	6	7	32.71	4.97	2/52	39.4	0	0
Syed Quadri	6	6	6	40.83	5.78	4/40	42.3	1	0

- Source: ESPNcricinfo

== See also ==
- Hyderabad cricket team
- Hyderabad Cricket Association
