= Vaibhav =

- Pronunciation: [ˈʋɛːbʱʋ]
- Gender: Unknown (sometimes feminine depending upon the second part of the name)
- Language: Sanskrit, Marathi

Other names
- Alternative spelling: Vybav

Vaibhav (वैभव, [ˈʋɛːbʱəʋ]) is a male given name in the Sanskrit language.

== People ==
- Vaibhav Deshpande (born 1987), Indian cricketer
- Vaibhav Kaul (born 1991), Indian photographer
- Vaibhav Madhukar Pichad (born 1974), Indian politician
- Vaibhav Mangle (born 1975), Indian actor
- Vaibhav Naik (born 1982), Indian politician
- Vaibhav Rawal (born 1991), Indian cricketer
- Vaibhav Reddy (born 1980), Indian actor
- Vaibhav Sooryavanshi (born 2011), Indian cricketer
- Vaibhav Suri, (born 1997) Indian chess grandmaster
- Vaibhav Talwar (born 1974), Indian actor
- Vaibhav Taneja, American business executive
- Vaibbhav Tatwawdi (born 1988), Indian actor
- Vaibhav Wategaonkar (born 1982), Indian cricketer
