= 2015 ICC Africa Under-19 Championship Division One =

2015 ICC Africa Under-19 Championship
- Dates: 14 – 20 February 2015
- Administrator: African Cricket Association
- Cricket format: 50-over
- Tournament format: Round-robin
- Host: Tanzania
- Champions: Namibia (5th title)
- Participants: 6
- Matches: 15
- Player of the series: (Kenya) Paramveer Singh
- Most runs: (Namibia) Zane Green (271)
- Most wickets: (Kenya) Snehil Gajparia (13)

The 2015 ICC Africa Under-19 Championship was a cricket tournament held in Dar es Salaam, Tanzania, from 14–20 February 2015.

Namibia won the tournament (its fifth overall, and third consecutive) on points from Uganda, thus qualifying directly for the 2016 ICC Under-19 World Cup in Bangladesh. As runner-up, Uganda qualified for the 2015 Under-19 World Cup Qualifier, along with runners-up at other regional tournaments, with the winner of the World Cup Qualifier securing the final place at the World Cup. Two African under-19 sides, South Africa and Zimbabwe, are ICC full members, and thus qualify directly for the World Cup.

The tournament was the sixth edition of the ICC Africa Under-19 Championships, and the first to be held in Tanzania. It was originally scheduled to be played in Namibia in December 2014, but was postponed and then relocated by the African Cricket Association, only a month before the tournament's scheduled start. Matches at the tournament were televised live on Azam TV, an East African satellite provider.

== Teams and qualification ==
The top five teams at the eight-team 2013 Division One tournament qualified directly for the 2015 Division One tournament. The three bottom teams (Sierra Leone, Tanzania, and Zambia) were relegated to the 2014 ICC Africa Under-19 Championship Division Two tournament. Tanzania were undefeated at the tournament, and consequently returned to Division One.

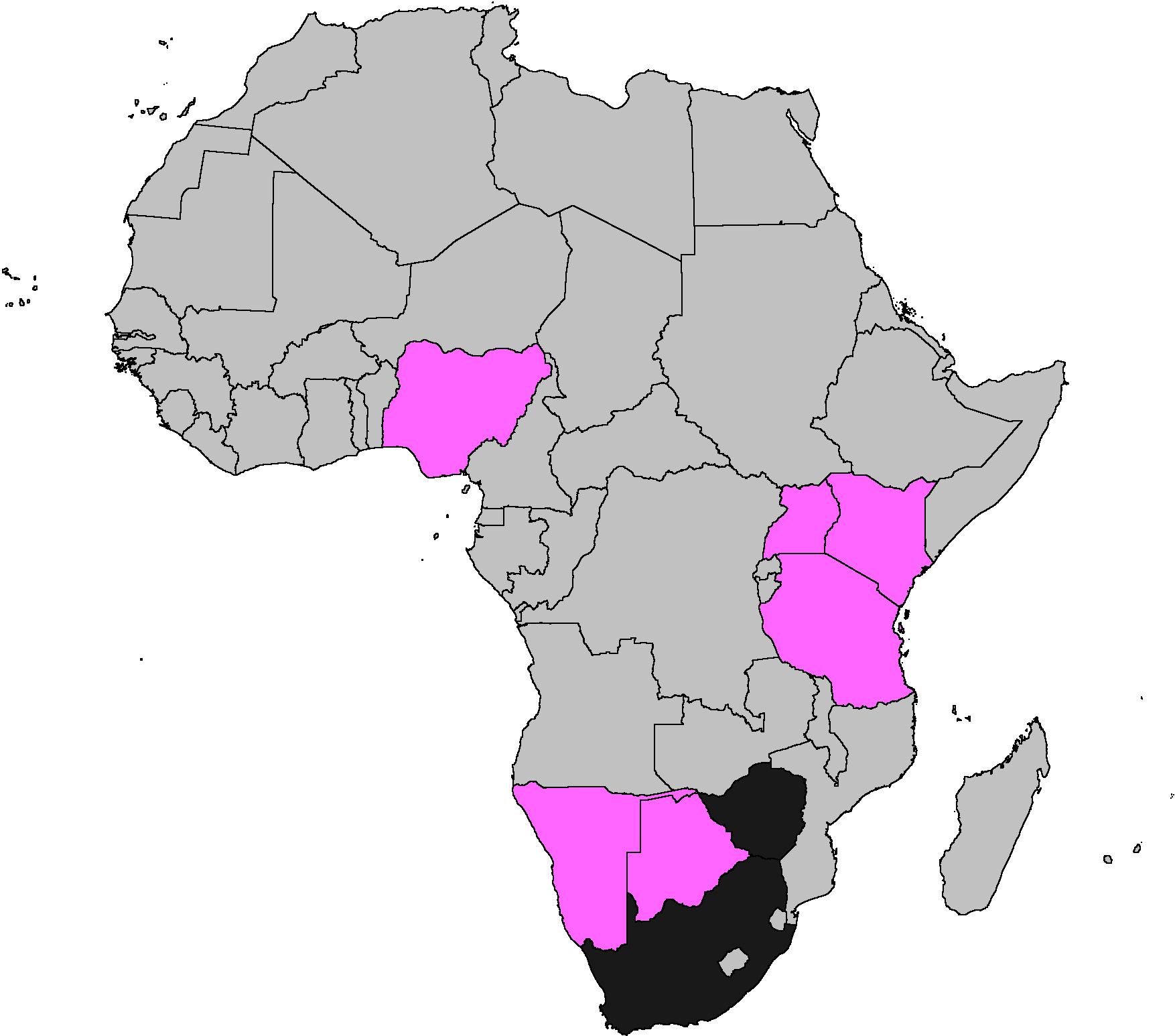
Teams at the 2015 ICC Africa Under-19 Championship (Division One) Teams automatically qualified for the 2016 World Cup (ICC full members)

Team	Mode of qualification
Namibia	Champion of 2013 Division One
Kenya	Runner-up in 2013 Division One
Uganda	3rd place in 2013 Division One
Botswana	4th place in 2013 Division One
Nigeria	5th place in 2013 Division One
Tanzania	Champion of 2014 Division Two

== Preparation ==
Botswana, coached by Obert Musiyamhanje, held two separate training camps, one in the north of the country, in Francistown, and another in the south, in the capital Gaborone. At least three of the players named in the 24-man squad for the championship have already represented the Botswanan senior side.

Four teams – Kenya A, Kenya B, Tanzania, and Uganda – played a series of friendly matches in December 2014, in Nairobi, Kenya. Tanzania, coached by a former captain of the senior national side, Hamisi Abdallah, subsequently participated in a two-month training camp at the Muhimbili Cricket Academy in Dar es Salaam. The Kenyan side, coached by former ODI player Thomas Odoyo, held a training camp at the Sir Ali Muslim Club Ground, Nairobi, in early February 2015.

Namibia, the winner of the 2013 tournament, prepared for the 2015 edition by playing a three-match one-day series against Zimbabwe. The matches were played in Harare in early February 2015, all at the Old Hararians ground. Coached by Zimbabwean Norbert Manyande, Namibia had early undertaken a brief two-day training camp at the Wanderers Cricket Ground in Windhoek. Their squad included at least two players from the previous 2014 World Cup.

== Fixtures ==
Matches were played at the Annadil Burhani, University of Dar es Salaam and Dar es Salaam Gymkhana Club grounds.

== Points table ==
Team	Pld	W	L	T	NR	Pts	NRR
Namibia	5	4	1	0	0	8	+2.201
Uganda	5	3	2	0	0	6	+0.684
Kenya	5	3	2	0	0	6	+0.133
Tanzania	5	2	3	0	0	4	–0.595
Nigeria	5	2	3	0	0	4	–0.938
Botswana	5	1	4	0	0	2	–1.669

Source: CricketArchive

== Statistics ==
=== Most runs ===
The top five runscorers are included in this table, ranked by runs scored and then by batting average.

Player	Team	Runs	Inns	Avg	Highest	100s	50s
Zane Green	Namibia	271	5	67.75	155*	1	1
Sybrand Loftie-Eaton	Namibia	204	5	51.00	80	0	2
Jurgen Linde	Namibia	120	4	30.00	73	0	1
Gurdeep Singh	Kenya	108	5	21.60	49	0	0
Mias Strauss	Namibia	103	5	25.75	55*	0	1

Source: CricketArchive

=== Most wickets ===
The top five wicket takers are listed in this table, ranked by wickets taken and then by bowling average.

Player	Team	Overs	Wkts	Ave	SR	Econ	BBI
Snehil Gajparia	Kenya	45.0	13	6.92	20.76	2.00	5/15
Paramveer Singh	Kenya	44.3	12	8.25	22.25	2.22	4/16
Raahil Krishna	Tanzania	48.0	11	9.09	26.18	2.08	4/17
David Wabwire	Uganda	25.0	10	7.20	15.00	2.88	7/11
Juma Mohamedi	Tanzania	34.0	10	10.70	20.40	3.14	4/20

Source: CricketArchive
