= 2013 ICC Africa Under-19 Championship Division One =

2013 ICC Africa Under-19 Championship
- Administrator: African Cricket Association
- Cricket format: 50-over
- Tournament format(s): Round-robin, then finals series
- Host: Uganda
- Champions: Namibia (4th title)
- Participants: 8
- Matches: 16
- Player of the series: (Uganda) Lawrence Sempijja
- Most runs: (Namibia) Xander Pitchers (228)
- Most wickets: (Kenya) Paramveer Singh (13)

The 2013 ICC Africa Under-19 Championship Division One was a cricket tournament held in Uganda from 25 to 31 May 2013. Matches were played at grounds in Entebbe and Kampala, with Kampala's Lugogo Stadium hosting the final.

Namibia won the tournament by defeating Kenya in the final, qualifying for the 2014 Under-19 World Cup in the United Arab Emirates. Two African under-19 sides, South Africa and Zimbabwe, are ICC full members, and thus qualified directly for the World Cup. Ugandan all-rounder Lawrence Sempijja was Player of the Tournament, while Namibian Xander Pitchers and Kenyan Paramveer Singh led the competition in runs and wickets, respectively. Namibia's JJ Smit was named Player of the Final, having taken 4/17 (including a hat-trick).

The tournament was the fifth edition of the ICC Africa Under-19 Championships, and the second to be held in Uganda (after the inaugural championship in 2001). Eight teams participated, divided into two pools for the group stages. The five best teams after the tournament's playoffs qualified directly for the 2015 Division One tournament, while the three lowest-placed teams were relegated to the 2014 Division Two tournament, with the winner of that tournament gaining promotion to Division One in 2015.

== Teams and qualification ==
The top seven teams at the eight-team 2010 Division One tournament qualified directly for the 2013 Division One Tournament. The last-placed team, Tanzania, was relegated to the 2013 Division Two tournament, played in Benoni, South Africa, in March 2013. The Division Two tournament was won by Ghana, but that side was unable to attend the Division One tournament, with runner-up Tanzania taking their place.

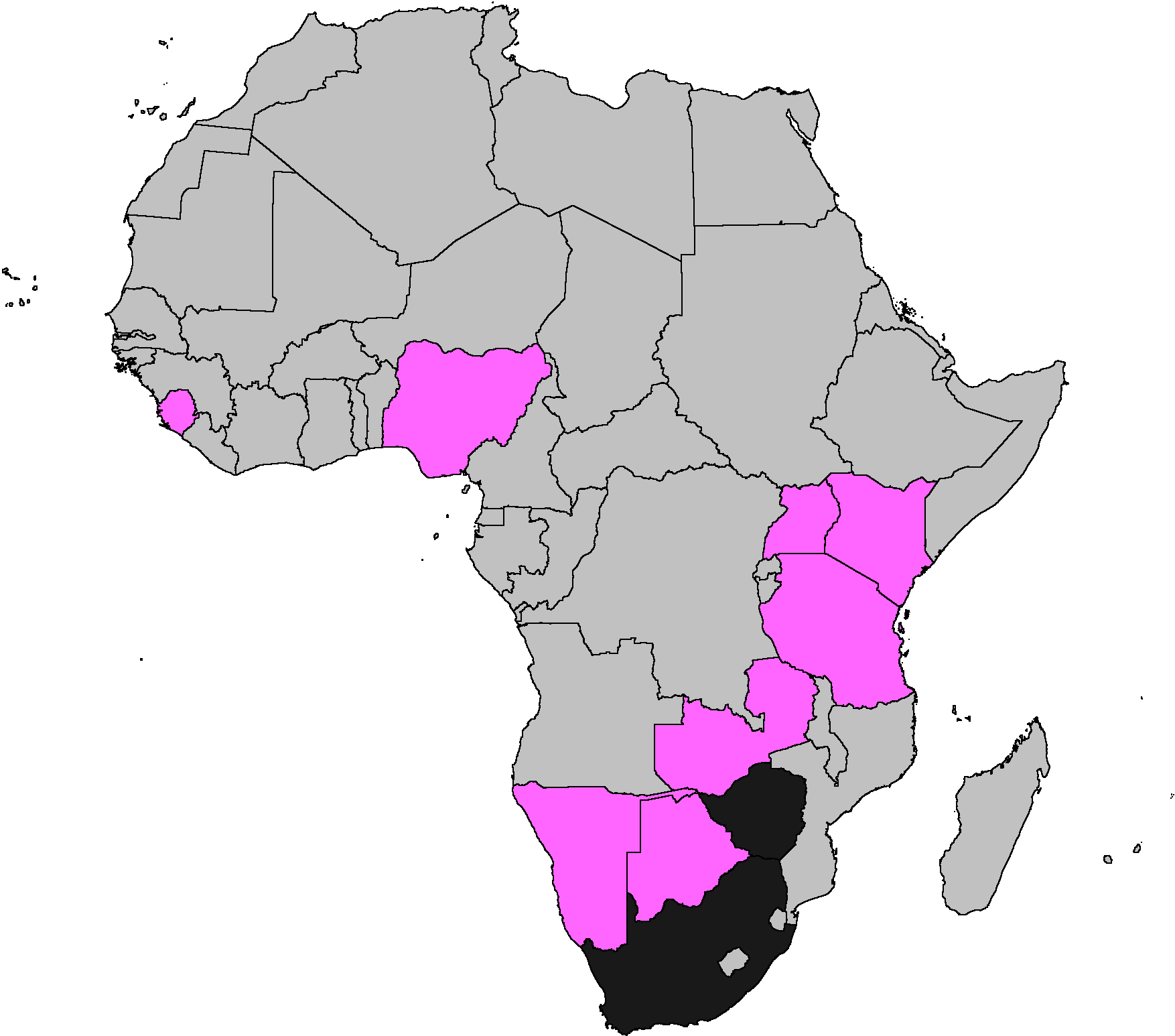
Teams at the 2013 ICC Africa Under-19 Championship (Division One) Teams automatically qualified for the 2014 World Cup (ICC full members)

Team	Mode of qualification
Namibia	Champion of 2010 Division One
Kenya	Runner-up in 2010 Division One
Botswana	3rd place in 2010 Division One
Zambia	4th place in 2010 Division One
Uganda	5th place in 2010 Division One
Sierra Leone	6th place in 2010 Division One
Nigeria	7th place in 2010 Division One
Tanzania	Runner-up in 2013 Division Two

== Group stage ==
=== Pool A ===
Qualified for the final.

Team	Pld	W	L	T	NR	Pts	NRR
Namibia	3	3	0	0	0	6	+3.009
Uganda	3	2	1	0	0	4	+2.105
Zambia	3	1	2	0	0	2	–2.519
Tanzania	3	0	3	0	0	0	–2.530

=== Pool B ===
Qualified for the final.

Team	Pld	W	L	T	NR	Pts	NRR
Kenya	3	3	0	0	0	6	+2.903
Botswana	3	2	1	0	0	4	+0.549
Nigeria	3	1	2	0	0	2	–1.401
Sierra Leone	3	0	3	0	0	0	–2.505

== Finals ==
=== 7th-place playoff ===
30 May
Scorecard

Tanzania; 131 (42.1 overs)	v	Sierra Leone; 106 (42 overs)
S. J. Ally 33 (56); Balowa Mansaray 3/8 (2 overs)		Abass Gbla 23 (38); Zamoyoni Jabeneke 3/28 (9)

Tanzania under-19s won by 25 runs.
Kyambogo Cricket Oval, Kampala
Umpires: Emmanuel Byiringiro (Rwa) and Andrew Louw (Nam)
Player of the match: Balowa Mansaray (SL)

- Tanzania won the toss and elected to bat.

=== 5th-place playoff ===
30 May
Scorecard

Nigeria; 221/9 (50 overs)	v	Zambia; 93/8 (50 overs)
Bimbo Adu 57 (87); Azhar Haveliwala 4/37 (10 overs)		Javid Patel 43* (42); Joseph Adedeji 2/14 (10 overs)

Nigeria under-19s won by 128 runs.
Entebbe Cricket Oval, Entebbe
Umpires: Munir Khan (Ken) and Patric Makumbi (Uga)
Player of the match: Bimbo Adu (Nga)

- Nigeria won the toss and elected to bat.
- Nigeria qualified directly for the 2015 Division One tournament. Zambia was relegated to 2014 Division Two.

=== 3rd-place playoff ===
31 May
Scorecard

Uganda; 245/7 (50 overs)	v	Botswana; 125 (41.4 overs)
Lawrence Sempijja 79 (140); Dhruv Maisuria 2/31 (10 overs)		Ameer Saiyed 34 (56); Lawrence Sempijja 3/11 (6 overs)

Uganda under-19s won by 120 runs
Kyambogo Cricket Oval, Kampala
Umpires: Munir Khan (Ken) and Patric Makumbi (Uga)
Player of the match: Lawrence Sempijja (Uga)

- Uganda won the toss and elected to bat.

=== Final ===
31 May
Scorecard

Namibia; 173 (47.2 overs)	v	Kenya; 121 (40 overs)
Xander Pitchers 52 (86); Paramveer Singh 3/28 (9.2 overs)		Hamza Malik 47 (90); JJ Smit 4/17 (8 overs)

Namibia under-19s won by 52 runs.
Lugogo Stadium, Kampala
Umpires: Ravi Angara (Bot) and Rockie D'Mello (Ken)
Player of the match: JJ Smit (Nam)

- Namibia won the toss and elected to bat.
- Namibia won the Championship, and qualified for the 2014 Under-19 World Cup.

== Statistics ==
=== Most runs ===
The top five runscorers are included in this table, ranked by runs scored and then by batting average.

Player	Team	Runs	Inns	Avg	Highest	100s	50s
Xander Pitchers	Namibia	228	3	76.00	161	1	1
Hamza Malik	Kenya	165	4	41.25	75	0	1
Lawrence Sempijja	Uganda	153	4	51.00	79	0	2
Emmanuel Bundi	Kenya	137	4	45.66	63*	0	1
Ameer Saiyed	Botswana	126	4	31.50	43	0	0

Source: CricketArchive

=== Most wickets ===
The top five wicket takers are listed in this table, ranked by wickets taken and then by bowling average.

Player	Team	Overs	Wkts	Ave	SR	Econ	BBI
Paramveer Singh	Kenya	30.2	13	5.46	14.00	2.34	5/16
JJ Smit	Namibia	29.5	12	6.91	14.91	2.78	4/17
Dhruv Maisuria	Botswana	37.4	11	10.72	20.54	3.13	5/32
Raj Savala	Kenya	31.2	9	8.55	20.88	2.45	5/6
Aarnav Ram	Botswana	36.0	9	13.66	24.00	3.41	3/11

Source: CricketArchive
