= Asnodkar =

Asnodkar is a Konkani toponymic surname. Notable people with the surname include:

- Rohit Asnodkar (born 1986), Indian cricketer
- Swapnil Asnodkar (born 1984), Indian cricketer
- Ulhas Asnodkar (born 1955), Indian politician
