= Siddharth Chitnis =

Indian cricketer (born 1987)

Personal information
- Full name: Siddharth Chitnis
- Born: May 6, 1987 (age 39); Bombay, Maharashtra, India
- Batting: Right-handed
- Bowling: Right-arm off break
- Role: All-rounder

Domestic team information
- Years: Team
- 2008: Mumbai Indians
- 2009: Rajasthan Royals
- 2011–2012: Kings XI Punjab
- Mumbai
- Source: Cricinfo, 3 May 2025

Siddharth Chitnis (born 6 May 1987 in Bombay) is an Indian cricketer. He has played for Kings XI Punjab since 2011.
