= Fort Maidan =

Multi-use stadium in Palakkad, India

Coordinates: 10°46′00.63″N 76°39′24.86″E

Ground information
- Location: Palakkad, Kerala, India
- Establishment: 2003
- Capacity: 10,000
- End names
- Park End; Municipal Office End

Team information
Kerala Cricket Team	(2003-present)
- As of 26 August 2015; Source: ESPNcricinfo

Fort Maidan, also known as Kota Maidanam, is a multi-use stadium in Palakkad, India. It is currently used mostly for cricket matches. The Fort Maidan holds a maximum capacity of 10,000 peoples at a time.

Up till 2002 the ground was considered for local cricket only. In 2003, Ranji Trophy was introduced in Fort Maidan. Now Fort Maidan is a regular venue for first class cricket. Many famous state level cricket matches were held in this stadium.
