= Shiv Shanker =

Indian cricketer (born 1982)

Personal information
- Born: 2 May 1982 (age 44); Hyderabad, India

Domestic team information
- Years: Team
- 2008: Hyderabad

Career statistics
Competition	FC
Matches	2
Runs scored	8
Batting average	4.00
100s/50s	0/0
Top score	7*
Balls bowled	407
Wickets	6
Bowling average	32.00
5 wickets in innings	0
10 wickets in match	0
Best bowling	3/28
Catches/stumpings	1/0
- Source: ESPNcricinfo, 22 August 2018

Shiv Shanker (born 2 May 1982) is an Indian former cricketer. He played two first-class matches for Hyderabad in 2008.

== See also ==
- List of Hyderabad cricketers
