= Omkar Gurav =

Indian cricketer (born 1988)

Personal information
- Full name: Onkar Dattaram Gurav
- Born: 29 June 1988 (age 38); Mumbai
- Batting: Right-handed
- Role: Wicketkeeper

Domestic team information
- Years: Team
- 2007-2011: Mumbai
- Source: ESPNcricinfo, 24 April 2016

Onkar Dattaram Gurav (born 29 June 1988) is an Indian cricketer who plays for Mumbai. He is right-hand wicket-keeper batsman
