= Vaibhav Kaul =

Himalayan photographer and geographer

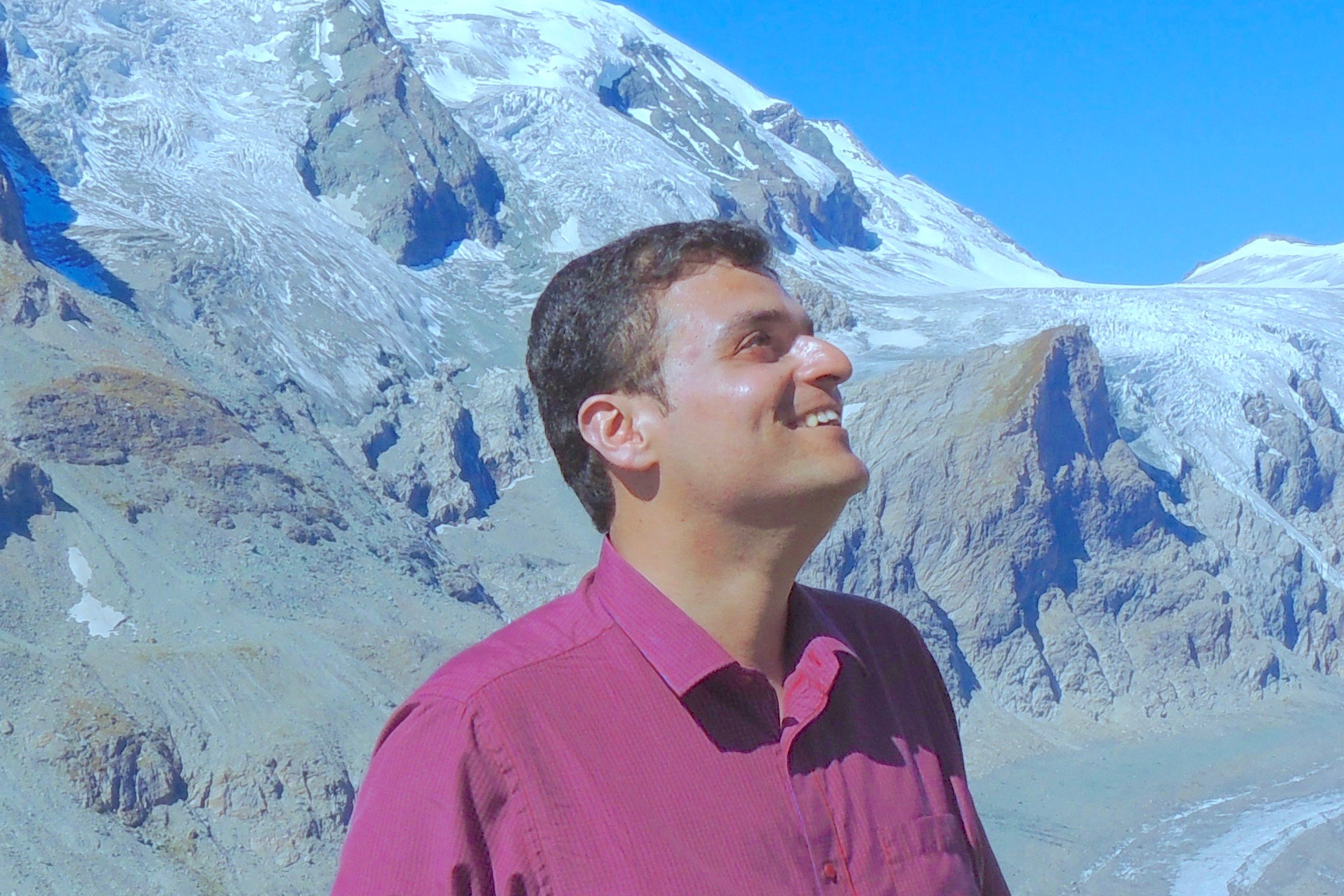
- Born: 1991 (age 34–35)
- Education: University of Oxford, University of Sheffield, University of Delhi
- Occupation: Geographer
- Known for: Mountain research, visual art

Vaibhav Kaul FRAS FRGS (born 1991) is a Himalayan geographer, environmental scholar, photographer, painter, traditional vocalist, and cultural archivist.

== Career ==
Kaul is an alumnus of the Environmental Change Institute at the University of Oxford, the University of Sheffield, and the University of Delhi, and a Fellow of the Royal Geographical Society and the Royal Asiatic Society. He has investigated socio-environmental change and disaster risk in the glaciated high-mountain regions of Sikkim, Nepal, Kumaon, Garhwal, Lahaul, and Kishtwar-Purig on the Indian subcontinent. His landscape art, visual geology and visual ethnography works have been exhibited and published in Asia, Africa, Europe and the Americas.

Kaul collaborated with the film director Ross Harrison to make Facing the Mountain, a 2016 documentary based on his research on change, risk, faith and resilience in the Himalayas. He appeared in An Awakening (2017) and Playing with Snowballs in the Prison of Time (2018), both poetic Anglo-Himalayan art films that he created with the cinematographer John Seddon as part of a video autoethnography experiment. Kaul and Seddon also made Mountain, Priest, Son, an award-winning 2018 film based on Kaul's geographical research into the metaphysics of environmental, economic and cultural risk amid rapid change in the Himalayas.
