= Sundeep Rajan =

Indian cricketer (born 1989)

Personal information
- Born: 26 September 1989 (age 37); Secunderabad, India

Domestic team information
- Years: Team
- 2012-2014: Hyderabad

Career statistics
Competition	FC	LA	T20
Matches	3	6	4
Runs scored	38	78	61
Batting average	12.66	13.00	30.50
100s/50s	0/0	0/1	0/0
Top score	38	52	34
Catches/stumpings	4/0	4/0	2/0
- Source: ESPNcricinfo, 25 June 2018

Sundeep Rajan (born 26 September 1989) is an Indian former cricketer. He played three first-class matches for Hyderabad between 2012 and 2013.

== See also ==
- List of Hyderabad cricketers
