= Rohan Belekar =

Indian cricketer (born 1987)

Personal information
- Full name: Rohan Santosh Belekar
- Born: 27 October 1987 (age 39); Mapusa, Goa, India
- Source: ESPNcricinfo, 22 November 2016

Rohan Belekar (born 27 October 1987) is an Indian first-class cricketer who plays for Goa. He made his first-class debut for Goa in the 2012–13 Ranji Trophy on 29 December 2012.
