= Sunil Raju =

Indian cricketer (born 1988)

Suneel Raju
Personal information
- Born: 4 September 1988 (age 38); Bangalore, Karnataka
- Batting: Right-handed
- Bowling: Right-arm offbreak
- Source: Cricinfo, 6 June 2018

Suneel Raju (born 4 September 1988) is an Indian cricketer. He played the different formats of First-class cricket, List A cricket and T20 for the India national under-19 cricket team from 2008 to 2018. He also played for multiple franchises at the KPL level and has won it multiple times as well.
