= Ukku Stadium =

Cricket ground in Andhra Pradesh

Coordinates: 17°39′34″N 83°8′36″E

- Steel Plant Stadium; Trishna Stadium
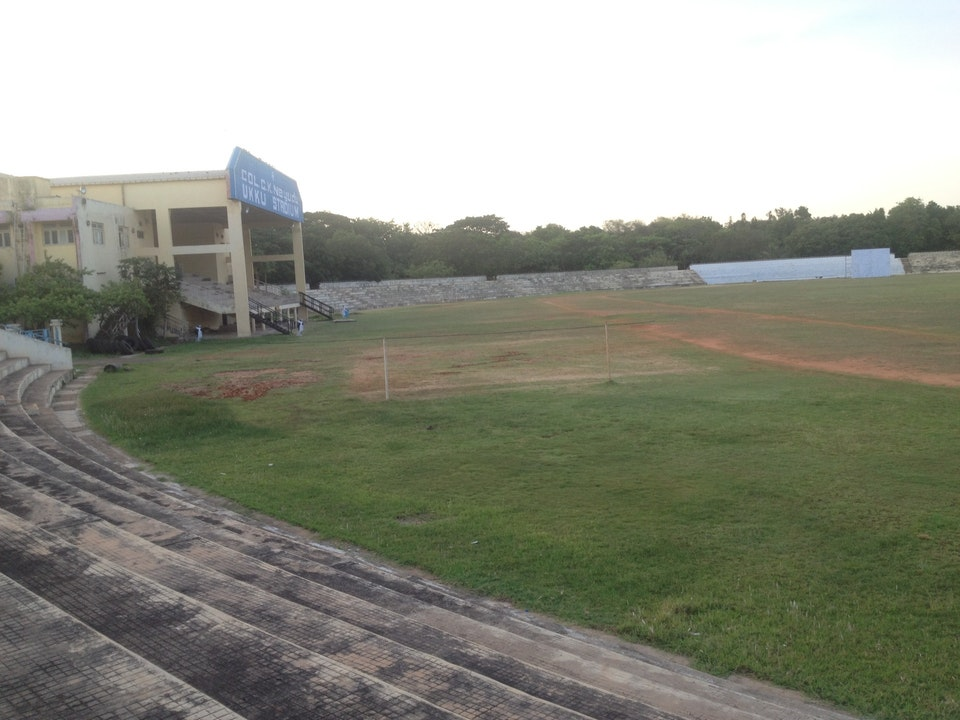
- Ukku Stadium

Ground information
- Location: Ukkunagaram, Vizag, Andhra Pradesh
- Establishment: 1991
- Capacity: 10,000

Team information
Andhra	(1991-1995)
- As of 31 August 2015; Source: Ground profile

Ukku Stadium or Trishna Stadium or Steel Plant Stadium is a cricket ground located in Vizag, Andhra Pradesh, India. The first first-class to be played there came in the 1991 Ranji Trophy when Andhra cricket team played Karnataka cricket team . Between the 1991 season to the 2004/06 season, the ground held 8 first-class matches.

The ground held a List A match in October 1997 when Andhra cricket team played the Tamil Nadu cricket team in the 1997/98 Ranji Trophy one-day competition. The ground held 8 first-class matches.

The ground has hosted few matches of Youth One Day International when South Africa Under-19s and Zimbabwe Under-19s played in an Afro-Asia Under-19 Cup 2005/06. The ground has hosted 4 more matches of the tournament.
