= Parth Jhala =

Indian cricketer (born 1989)

Personal information
- Born: 28 October 1989 (age 37); Baroda, India
- Source: Cricinfo, 17 April 2016

Parth Jhala (born 28 October 1989) is an Indian former cricketer. He played two first-class matches for Hyderabad between 2012 and 2013.

== See also ==
- List of Hyderabad cricketers
