= Farman Ahmed =

Indian cricketer (born 1983)

Personal information
- Born: 8 October 1983 (age 43); Delhi, India
- Batting: Right-handed
- Bowling: Right-arm

Domestic team information
- Years: Team
- Delhi
- Source: ESPNcricinfo, 13 October 2018

Farman Ahmed (born 8 October 1983) is an Indian former cricketer. He played eleven Twenty20 cricket matches for Delhi between 2009 and 2012.
