= Abdul Baseer (cricketer) =

Indian cricketer (1989-)

Mohammed Abdul Baseer
Personal information
- Full name: Mohammed Abdul Baseer
- Born: 9 February 1989 (age 37); Hyderabad, India
- Batting: Right-handed
- Bowling: Right-arm medium
- Role: Bowler

Domestic team information
- Years: Team
- 2009/10: Hyderabad

Career statistics
Competition	First-class	T20
Matches	1	3
Runs scored	–	8
Batting average	–	8.00
100s/50s	–	0/0
Top score	–	8
Balls bowled	144	42
Wickets	1	1
Bowling average	94	76
5 wickets in innings	0	0
10 wickets in match	0	0
Best bowling	1/94	1/30
Catches/stumpings	1/–	1/–
- Source: CricketArchive, 11 June 2017

Abdul Baseer (also spelled Basheer) (born 2 September 1989) is an Indian first-class cricketer, active since 2009–10, who has played for Hyderabad. He is a right-handed batsman and a right-arm medium pace bowler.

Baseer made his top-class debut for Hyderabad on 13 March 2010 in the Syed Mushtaq Ali Trophy, a Twenty20 competition involving teams participating in the Ranji Trophy. Playing in a quarter-final match against Mumbai at the Holkar Stadium, Baseer opened the bowling and took none for 30 as Mumbai totalled 181 for seven. He was due to bat at number ten for Hyderabad but was not needed as his team won the match by seven wickets. Hyderabad progressed to the semi-final and played Delhi at the Holkar Stadium. Delhi batted first and scored 157 for eight with Baseer taking none for 25. Hyderabad won by five wickets and, as in the first match, Baseer was not needed to bat. This win took Hyderabad into the final, again at the Holkar Stadium, but they lost by 19 runs to Maharashtra. Baseer opened the bowling and took none for 21 as Maharashtra scored 119 all out. Hyderabad were themselves bowled out for 100 and Baseer batted number eleven. He scored 8 from five deliveries before he was lbw to Kishor Bhikane and was last man out.

In the 2010–11 season, Baseer made a single appearance in the Ranji Trophy, this being his first-class debut. The match was against Madhya Pradesh at the Gymkhana Ground, Secunderabad in December 2010. Because of bad weather, resulting in no play at all on the first day, it ended in a draw. Hyderabad won the toss and decided to field but the decision backfired as Madhya Pradesh accumulated 422 for four declared. Their top scorer was Mohnish Mishra with 214 and he became Baseer's first victim when he was finally caught behind. Hyderabad scored 286 for six before time ran out. Baseer did not bat.

Outside top-class cricket, Baseer has played in ten under-22 and under-25 matches for Hyderabad but he has not reappeared for the team in any form of cricket since 2011.
