= Neeraj Bist =

Indian cricketer (born 1990)

Personal information
- Born: 3 April 1990 (age 36); Hyderabad, India

Domestic team information
- Years: Team
- 2010-2012: Hyderabad

Career statistics
| Competition | List A | T20 |
|---|---|---|
| Matches | 2 | 10 |
| Runs scored | 133 | 81 |
| Batting average | 133.00 | 11.57 |
| 100s/50s | 0/2 | 0/0 |
| Top score | 70* | 29 |
| Balls bowled | 24 | 60 |
| Wickets | 0 | 4 |
| Bowling average | - | 18.00 |
| 5 wickets in innings | - | 0 |
| 10 wickets in match | - | 0 |
| Best bowling | - | 2/28 |
| Catches/stumpings | 0/0 | 5/0 |
- Source: ESPNcricinfo, 3 July 2018

Neeraj Bist (born 3 April 1990) is an Indian former cricketer. He played two List A matches for Hyderabad in 2010.

== See also ==
- List of Hyderabad cricketers
