= Habeeb Ahmed =

Indian cricketer (born 1987)

Personal information
- Full name: Habeeb Ahmed
- Born: 7 November 1987 (age 39); Hyderabad, India
- Batting: Right-handed
- Role: Wicket-keepar

Domestic team information
- Years: Team
- 2007–2016: Hyderabad

Career statistics
Competition	FC	LA	T20
Matches	16	12	12
Runs scored	376	170	53
Batting average	18.80	21.25	10.60
100s/50s	0/1	0/0	0/0
Top score	78*	44*	18
Catches/stumpings	29/5	15/6	8/4
- Source: ESPNcricinfo, 23 June 2018

Habeeb Ahmed (born 7 November 1987) is an Indian first-class cricketer who plays for Hyderabad.
