= Shoaib Ahmed (Indian cricketer) =

Indian cricketer (born 1987)

Personal information
- Full name: Syed Mohammad Shoaib Ahmed
- Born: 19 November 1987 (age 38); Hyderabad, India
- Batting: Right-handed
- Bowling: Right-arm fast-medium

Domestic team information
- Years: Team
- 2007–2011: Hyderabad
- 2009: Deccan Chargers

Career statistics
Competition	FC	LA	T20
Matches	13	12	8
Runs scored	151	47	1
Batting average	9.43	11.75	0.50
100s/50s	0/0	0/0	0/0
Top score	32	30	1*
Balls bowled	1,820	455	102
Wickets	18	24	5
Bowling average	42.72	14.08	30.40
5 wickets in innings	0	3	0
10 wickets in match	0	0	0
Best bowling	3/50	7/15	2/20
Catches/stumpings	2/–	1/–	4/–
- Source: ESPNcricinfo, 20 July 2018

Shoaib Ahmed (born 19 November 1987) is an Indian former cricketer. He played thirteen first-class matches for Hyderabad between 2007 and 2009.
