= 2010–11 Ranji Trophy =

Ranji trophy season

- The Ranji trophy awarded to the winners.
- Administrator(s): BCCI
- Cricket format: First-class cricket
- Tournament format(s): Round-robin then knockout
- Champions: Rajasthan (1st title)
- Participants: 27
- Most runs: Subramaniam Badrinath (922) (Tamil Nadu)
- Most wickets: Bhargav Bhatt (47) (Baroda)

The 2010–11 Ranji Trophy season was the 77th Ranji trophy season. It was contested through two leagues: Super and Plate. Each division was divided into 2 groups – A and B, each team played all the other teams from its group only once, either home or away.

The Super League is divided into two groups of eight and seven teams, while the Plate League is divided into two groups of six teams each. In both divisions, the top two teams from each group advance to the knock-out phase. The finalists from the Plate League are promoted to the Super League the next year while the two teams at the bottom of the Super League are relegated.

According to the new Ranji format which was implemented from 2008 to 2009 season, the top two Plate teams join three teams each from the two groups in the Super League to play a knock-out from the quarter-final stage. The new format, thus, gives a relegated side realistic chance of winning the title.

== Points summary ==
Points in the league stages of both divisions are awarded as follows:

| Scenario | Points |
|---|---|
| Win Outright | 5 |
| Bonus Point (for innings and 10 wicket wins) | 1 |
| 1st Innings Lead | 3 ^{*} |
| No Result | 1 |
| 1st Innings Deficit | 1 ^{*} |
| Lost Outright | 0 |

note^{*} – If match ends in a draw.

== Teams ==
For a complete list of teams which have played in the competition at some point during its history, see Ranji Trophy – Historical Note.

=== Super League ===
Group A

- Mumbai
- Delhi
- Tamil Nadu
- Bengal
- Saurashtra
- Gujarat
- Assam
- Railways

Group B

- Karnataka
- Punjab
- Uttar Pradesh
- Baroda
- Himachal
- Haryana
- Orissa

=== Plate League ===
Group A

- Hyderabad
- Rajasthan
- Madhya Pradesh
- Orissa
- Tripura
- Jharkhand (formerly known as Bihar)

Group B

- Maharashtra
- Andhra Pradesh
- Kerala
- Jammu & Kashmir
- Vidarbha
- Services

== Points table ==
=== Super League ===
Super league – Group A

| Teams | Matches | Won | Lost | Tied | Draw | No results | Points | Quotient |
|---|---|---|---|---|---|---|---|---|
| Mumbai | 7 | 2 | 0 | 0 | 5 | 0 | 24 | 1.812 |
| Tamil Nadu | 7 | 1 | 0 | 0 | 6 | 0 | 17 | 1.594 |
| Railways | 7 | 2 | 1 | 0 | 4 | 0 | 17 | 1.046 |
| Delhi | 7 | 1 | 1 | 0 | 5 | 0 | 14 | 1.201 |
| Gujarat | 7 | 1 | 1 | 0 | 5 | 0 | 14 | 0.624 |
| Bengal | 7 | 0 | 1 | 0 | 6 | 0 | 12 | 0.798 |
| Saurashtra | 7 | 1 | 1 | 0 | 5 | 0 | 10 | 0.752 |
| Assam | 7 | 0 | 3 | 0 | 4 | 0 | 8 | 0.739 |

Super League – Group B

| Teams | Matches | Won | Lost | Tied | Draw | No results | Points | Quotient |
|---|---|---|---|---|---|---|---|---|
| Karnataka | 6 | 3 | 0 | 0 | 3 | 0 | 23 | 1.588 |
| Baroda | 6 | 3 | 1 | 0 | 2 | 0 | 20 | 1.344 |
| Haryana | 6 | 2 | 1 | 0 | 3 | 0 | 17 | 0.973 |
| Uttar Pradesh | 6 | 1 | 1 | 0 | 4 | 0 | 14 | 0.803 |
| Punjab | 6 | 0 | 2 | 0 | 4 | 0 | 8 | 0.937 |
| Orissa | 6 | 0 | 2 | 0 | 4 | 0 | 8 | 0.646 |
| Himachal | 6 | 0 | 2 | 0 | 4 | 0 | 6 | 0.785 |

=== Plate League ===
Plate League – Group A

| Teams | Matches | Won | Lost | Tied | Draw | No results | Points | Quotient |
|---|---|---|---|---|---|---|---|---|
| Rajasthan | 5 | 2 | 0 | 0 | 3 | 0 | 18 | 1.82 |
| Madhya Pradesh | 5 | 2 | 0 | 0 | 3 | 0 | 16 | 2.016 |
| Goa | 5 | 1 | 1 | 0 | 3 | 0 | 11 | 1.211 |
| Hyderabad | 5 | 1 | 1 | 0 | 3 | 0 | 11 | 0.76 |
| Jharkhand | 5 | 1 | 2 | 0 | 2 | 0 | 8 | 0.645 |
| Tripura | 5 | 1 | 4 | 0 | 0 | 0 | 5 | 0.5 |

Plate League – Group B

| Teams | Matches | Won | Lost | Tied | Draw | No results | Points | Quotient |
|---|---|---|---|---|---|---|---|---|
| Andhra Pradesh | 5 | 2 | 0 | 0 | 3 | 0 | 18 | 1.528 |
| Maharashtra | 5 | 2 | 0 | 0 | 3 | 0 | 17 | 1.352 |
| Services | 5 | 2 | 0 | 0 | 3 | 0 | 16 | 1.275 |
| Kerala | 5 | 0 | 1 | 0 | 4 | 0 | 10 | 1.04 |
| Vidarbha | 5 | 1 | 2 | 0 | 2 | 0 | 9 | 0.846 |
| Jammu & Kashmir | 5 | 0 | 4 | 0 | 1 | 0 | 1 | 0.497 |

== Knock-out Stage ==
=== Plate League ===
The two top teams from each group of the Plate league met in semi-finals, the winners of which qualified for quarter-finals of the Super league.

| Match | Teams | Ground | Scores | Result |
|---|---|---|---|---|
| Semi-Final | Maharashtra v Rajasthan | Nasik | Rajasthan 641/7d and 203/2; Maharashtra 349 | Match drawn (Rajasthan goes through on First innings lead) |
| Semi-Final | Madhya Pradesh v Andhra | Indore | Andhra 230 and 313; Madhya Pradesh 341 and 204/1 | Madhya Pradesh won by 9 wickets |

=== Super League ===
The top three teams of each group of the Super league along with the two winners of the semi-finals from plate league qualified for the quarter-finals.

| Match | Teams | Ground | Scores | Result |
|---|---|---|---|---|
| Quarter-Final | Rajasthan v Mumbai | Jaipur | Mumbai 252 and 290/1; Rajasthan 589 | Match drawn (Rajasthan goes through on First innings lead) |
| Quarter-Final | Haryana v Tamil Nadu | Rohtak | Haryana 379/6d; Tamil Nadu 285/6 | Match drawn (Tamil Nadu goes through on run-rate) |
| Quarter-Final | Baroda v Railways | Vadodara | Railways 248 and 366/8d; Baroda 416 and 136/3 | Match drawn (Baroda goes through on First innings lead) |
| Quarter-Final | Madhya Pradesh v Karnataka | Indore | Madhya Pradesh 200 and 337; Karnataka 361 and 180/5 | Karnataka won by 5 wickets |
| Semi-Final | Rajasthan v Tamil Nadu | Jaipur | Rajasthan 552/7d; Tamil Nadu 385 and 2/0 (f/o) | Match drawn (Rajasthan goes through on First Innings Lead) |
| Semi-Final | Baroda v Karnataka | Vadodara | Karnataka 107 and 88; Baroda 153 and 44/3 | Baroda won by 7 wickets |
| Final | Baroda v Rajasthan | Vadodara | Rajasthan 394 and 341; Baroda 361 and 28/4 | Match drawn (Rajasthan wins on First Innings Lead) |
