= Robert Fernandez (cricketer) =

Indian cricketer (born 1986)

Personal information
- Full name: Robert Martin Fernandez
- Born: 29 September 1986 (age 40); Ernakulam, Kerala, India
- Source: Cricinfo, 11 October 2015

Robert Fernandez (born 29 September 1986) is an Indian first-class cricketer who plays for Kerala.
