= Vivek Krishna =

Indian cricketer (born 1990)

Personal information
- Born: 12 September 1990 (age 36); Hanamakonda, India

Domestic team information
- Years: Team
- 2010-2011: Hyderabad

Career statistics
| Competition | List A | T20 |
|---|---|---|
| Matches | 1 | 3 |
| Runs scored | - | 9 |
| Batting average | - | - |
| 100s/50s | - | - |
| Top score | - | 9* |
| Balls bowled | 60 | 48 |
| Wickets | 2 | 5 |
| Bowling average | 33.00 | 10.20 |
| 5 wickets in innings | 0 | 0 |
| 10 wickets in match | 0 | 0 |
| Best bowling | 2/66 | 4/25 |
| Catches/stumpings | 0/0 | 1/0 |
- Source: Cricinfo, 3 July 2018

Vivek Krishna (born 12 September 1990) is an Indian former cricketer. He played one List A match for Hyderabad in 2011.

== See also ==
- List of Hyderabad cricketers
