= Benjamin Thomas (cricketer) =

Indian cricketer (born 1989)

Personal information
- Born: 20 June 1989 (age 37); Hyderabad, India

Domestic team information
- Years: Team
- 2010–2016: Hyderabad

Career statistics
Competition	FC	List A	T20
Matches	3	7	4
Runs scored	61	120	44
Batting average	12.20	17.14	22.00
100s/50s	0/0	0/0	0/0
Top score	20	45	17
Catches/stumpings	7/0	4/0	3/0
- Source: ESPNcricinfo, 25 June 2018

Benjamin Thomas (born 20 June 1989) is an Indian cricketer. He played seven List A matches for Hyderabad between 2010 and 2013. He made his first-class debut for Hyderabad in the 2016–17 Ranji Trophy on 27 October 2016.

== See also ==
- List of Hyderabad cricketers
