= Vaibhav Deshpande =

Indian cricketer (born 1987)

Personal information
- Born: 11 January 1987 (age 39); Jaipur, India
- Source: Cricinfo, 22 October 2015

Vaibhav Deshpande (born 11 January 1987) is an Indian first-class cricketer who plays for Rajasthan.
