= Pagadala Naidu =

Indian cricketer (born 1990)

Personal information
- Born: 9 October 1990 (age 36); Hyderabad, India

Domestic team information
- Years: Team
- 2010–2015: Hyderabad

Career statistics
Competition	FC	LA	T20
Matches	15	19	19
Runs scored	130	161	54
Batting average	10.00	20.12	13.50
100s/50s	0/1	0/0	0/0
Top score	50	45*	18*
Balls bowled	2,365	857	364
Wickets	38	15	19
Bowling average	28.23	49.86	26.00
5 wickets in innings	0	0	0
10 wickets in match	0	0	0
Best bowling	4/16	3/62	3/5
Catches/stumpings	3/0	2/0	5/0
- Source: ESPNcricinfo, 21 June 2018

Pagadala Naidu (born 9 October 1990) is an Indian former cricketer. He played fifteen first-class matches for Hyderabad between 2010 and 2013.

== See also ==
- List of Hyderabad cricketers
