= Mohammed Khader =

Indian cricketer (born 1987)

Personal information
- Born: 6 November 1987 (age 39); Hyderabad, India
- Batting: Left Handed
- Bowling: Left Arm Medium
- Role: Bowler

Career statistics
Competition	FC
Matches	16
Runs scored	251
Batting average	19.30
100s/50s	0/0
Top score	35*
Balls bowled	2553
Wickets	32
Bowling average	43.59
5 wickets in innings	1
10 wickets in match	0
Best bowling	5/101
Catches/stumpings	6/0
- Source: ESPNcricinfo, 25 June 2018

Mohammed Khader (born 6 November 1987) is an Indian cricketer. He made his first-class debut for Hyderabad in the 2007–08 Ranji Trophy on 15 November 2007.
