= Rohit Asnodkar =

Indian cricketer (born 1986)

Personal information
- Full name: Rohit Devidas Asnodkar
- Born: 5 December 1986 (age 39); Porvorim, Goa, India
- Source: Cricinfo, 23 October 2015

Rohit Asnodkar (born 5 December 1986) is an Indian first-class cricketer who plays for Goa.
