= Paramveer Singh =

Indian cricketer (born 1987)

Personal information
- Born: 22 November 1987 (age 38); Hyderabad, India

Domestic team information
- Years: Team
- 2010-2012: Hyderabad

Career statistics
Competition	FC	List A	T20
Matches	2	9	7
Runs scored	37	54	105
Batting average	18.50	10.80	35.00
100s/50s	0/0	0/0	0/1
Top score	16*	21	65*
Balls bowled	126	357	36
Wickets	1	6	1
Bowling average	91.00	49.16	55.00
5 wickets in innings	0	0	0
10 wickets in match	0	0	0
Best bowling	1/91	2/33	1/35
Catches/stumpings	3/0	6/0	5/0
- Source: ESPNcricinfo, 3 July 2018

Paramveer Singh (born 22 November 1987) is an Indian former cricketer. He played two first-class matches for Hyderabad between 2010 and 2012.

== See also ==
- List of Hyderabad cricketers
