= 2012–13 Hyderabad C.A. season =

Hyderabad C.A.
2012–13 season
- Coach: Sunil Joshi
- Captain: V. V. S. Laxman (FC); Pragyan Ojha (LA); Akshath Reddy (T20)
- Ground(s): Rajiv Gandhi International Cricket Stadium, Hyderabad (Capacity: 55,000)
- Ranji Trophy: Group A (9th) (Relegated)
- Vijay Hazare Trophy: South Zone (5th)
- Syed Mushtaq Ali Trophy: South Zone (5th)

The 2012–13 season is Hyderabad cricket team's 79th competitive season. The Hyderabad cricket team is senior men's domestic cricket team based in the city of Hyderabad, India, run by the Hyderabad Cricket Association. They represent the region of Telangana in the state of Andhra Pradesh in domestic competitions.

== Competition overview ==
Category	Competition	Format	First match	Last match	Final position	Pld	W	L	D / T / NR	Win %
Senior men's	Ranji Trophy	First-class cricket	2 November 2012	29 December 2012	Relegated to Group C	8	0	2	6	0%
Senior men's	Vijay Hazare Trophy	List A cricket	14 February 2013	20 February 2013	Zonal Stage	5	1	4	0	20%
Senior men's	Syed Mushtaq Ali Trophy	Twenty20 cricket	17 March 2013	22 March 2013	Zonal Stage	5	1	4	0	20%

== Squads ==
- Head Coach : Sunil Joshi
- Fielding Coach : Noel David

Ranji Trophy	Vijay Hazare Trophy	Syed Mushtaq Ali Trophy
V. V. S. Laxman (c); Dwaraka Ravi Teja; Vishal Sharma; Mohammed Khader; Abhinav Kumar; Anwar Ahmed; Ashish Reddy; Ibrahim Khaleel (wk); Pagadala Naidu; Pragyan Ojha; Syed Quadri; Akshath Reddy; Bavanaka Sandeep; Hanuma Vihari; Arjun Yadav; Amol Shinde	Pragyan Ojha (c); Habeeb Ahmed (wk); Anwar Ahmed; Mungala Arjun; Ashish Reddy; Chama Milind; Praneeth Kumar; Rahul Singh; Sundeep Rajan; Dwaraka Ravi Teja; Bavanaka Sandeep; Amol Shinde; Kolla Sumanth (wk); Benjamin Thomas; Hanuma Vihari	Akshath Reddy (c); Habeeb Ahmed (wk); Ashish Reddy; Akash Bhandari; Mehdi Hasan; Chama Milind; Pagadala Naidu; Naveen Kumar; Praneeth Kumar; Rahul Singh; Dwaraka Ravi Teja; Bavanaka Sandeep; Amol Shinde; Tirumalasetti Suman; Hanuma Vihari

Irani Cup

Ojha got selected to the Rest of India squad for the 2012 Irani Cup, a first-class cricket competition in India.

NKP Salve Challenger Trophy

Ojha got selected to the India A squad for the 2012-13 NKP Salve Challenger Trophy, a List-A cricket tournament in India.

Duleep Trophy

Akshath got selected to the South Zone squad for the 2012-13 Duleep Trophy, a first-class cricket tournament in India.

Irani Cup

Ojha got selected to the Rest of India squad for the 2013 Irani Cup, a first-class cricket competition in India.

Deodhar Trophy

Ashish and Vihari got selected to the South Zone squad for the 2012-13 Deodhar Trophy, a List-A cricket competition in India.

Indian Premier League

The newly formed local franchise, Sunrisers Hyderabad, which replaced the previous franchise, Deccan Chargers, retained 20 of its players including the Hyderabad's Bhandari, Akshath, Ravi Teja and Ashish and later signed Vihari in the player's draft while Ojha got retained by the Mumbai Indians and Suman got signed by the Pune Warriors for the 2013 Indian Premier League, a professional Twenty20 cricket league in India.

== Ranji Trophy ==
The squad for the Ranji Trophy, the premier first-class cricket tournament in India, was announced on 21 October 2012 with V. V. S. Laxman, who recently announced his retirement from the international cricket, leading the Hyderabad. The Hyderabad began their campaign in the Ranji Trophy with a loss against the Punjab at Mohali on 2 November 2012. They finished at the bottom of the Group A with no wins, six draws and two losses and got relegated to the Group C for the 2013–14 Ranji Trophy.

=== Points Table ===
Group A

Team	Pld	W	L	D	A	Pts	Q
Punjab	8	4	2	2	0	32	1.276
Saurashtra	8	2	1	5	0	23	1.198
Mumbai	8	1	0	7	0	23	1.423
Gujarat	8	2	0	6	0	22	0.922
Railways	8	2	0	6	0	21	0.962
Madhya Pradesh	8	2	2	4	0	20	1.035
Bengal	8	1	4	3	0	13	0.805
Rajasthan	8	0	3	5	0	11	0.741
Hyderabad	8	0	2	6	0	10	0.800

- Top three teams advanced to knockout stage.
- Bottom team relegated to Group C for 2013–14 Ranji Trophy.
- Points system : Win by an innings or 10 wickets = 7, Win = 6, Draw with first innings lead = 3, Draw with first innings deficit = 1, No Result = 1, Loss = 0.

=== Matches ===
Group Stage

2–5 November 2012	Hyderabad	v	Punjab	Punjab won by an innings and 68 runs
Scorecard	258 (96.3 overs); Akshath Reddy 63 (154); Manpreet Gony 4/60 (21 overs)		565/6d (150 overs); Jiwanjot Singh 213 (368); Pagadala Naidu 2/85 (26 overs)	Punjab Cricket Association IS Bindra Stadium, Mohali; Umpires: Sanjeev Dua and Krishnamachari Bharatan
Scorecard	239 (80 overs); V. V. S. Laxman 67 (110); Siddarth Kaul 5/53 (18 overs)			Punjab Cricket Association IS Bindra Stadium, Mohali; Umpires: Sanjeev Dua and Krishnamachari Bharatan
Punjab won the toss and elected to field.; Jiwanjot Singh and Gurkeerat Singh (Punjab) made their first-class debuts.

9–12 November 2012	Hyderabad	v	Madhya Pradesh	Match Drawn Madhya Pradesh took first innings lead
Scorecard	341 (114.3 overs); V. V. S. Laxman 120 (193); Anand Rajan 4/64 (26 overs)		431/8d (191 overs); Jalaj Saxena 142 (332); Mohammed Khader 2/65 (27 overs)	Rajiv Gandhi International Cricket Stadium, Hyderabad; Umpires: Virender Sharma and Shashank Ranade
Scorecard	8/0 (8 overs); Akshath Reddy 8* (25)			Rajiv Gandhi International Cricket Stadium, Hyderabad; Umpires: Virender Sharma and Shashank Ranade
Hyderabad won the toss and elected to bat.

17–20 November 2012	Saurashtra	v	Hyderabad	Match Drawn Saurashtra took first innings lead
Scorecard	260 (98.1 overs); Sheldon Jackson 67 (100); Ashish Reddy 6/56 (23.1 overs)		186 (87.3 overs); Akshath Reddy 51 (113); Ravindra Jadeja 6/71 (35.3 overs)	Rajiv Gandhi International Cricket Stadium, Hyderabad; Umpires: Sanjeev Dua and Krishnamachari Bharatan
Scorecard	270/6d (90 overs); Sagar Jogiyani 69 (195); Akash Bhandari 4/92 (25 overs)		232/6 (91 overs); Ashish Reddy 56 (60); Ravindra Jadeja 3/84 (39 overs)	Rajiv Gandhi International Cricket Stadium, Hyderabad; Umpires: Sanjeev Dua and Krishnamachari Bharatan
Saurashtra won the toss and elected to bat.; Ashish Reddy and Akash Bhandari (Hyderabad) made their first-class debuts.

24–27 November 2012	Mumbai	v	Hyderabad	Match Drawn Hyderabad took first innings lead
Scorecard	443 (126.3 overs); Hiken Shah 156 (267); Ashish Reddy 4/77 (20.3 overs)		699 (207.3 overs); Akshath Reddy 196 (426); Ankeet Chavan 3/184 (46 overs)	Rajiv Gandhi International Cricket Stadium, Hyderabad; Umpires: Amardeep Pathania and Krishna Hariharan
Mumbai won the toss and elected to bat.; Kolla Sumanth and Ravi Kiran (Hyderabad) made their first-class debuts.

1–4 December 2012	Gujarat	v	Hyderabad	Match Drawn Gujarat took first innings lead
Scorecard	566 (165.2 overs); Smit Patel 114 (240); Lalith Mohan 3/116 (35.2 overs)		375 (145.1 overs); Bavanaka Sandeep 90 (250); Rakesh Dhruv 3/127 (47.1 overs)	Sardar Vallabhai Patel Stadium, Valsad; Umpires: Abhijit Deshmukh and Virender Sharma
Scorecard			124/2 (31 overs) (f/o); Bavanaka Sandeep 56* (86); Rush Kalaria 2/13 (6 overs)	Sardar Vallabhai Patel Stadium, Valsad; Umpires: Abhijit Deshmukh and Virender Sharma
Hyderabad won the toss and elected to field.; Krunal Patel, Bhavesh Baria (Gujarat); Sundeep Rajan (Hyderabad) all made their first-class debuts.

15–18 December 2012	Hyderabad	v	Bengal	Bengal won by 4 wickets
Scorecard	115 (37.1 overs); Kolla Sumanth 25 (52); Mohammad Shami 4/36 (12.1 overs)		116 (55.5 overs); Arindam Das 73 (178); Anwar Ahmed 5/44 (22.5 overs)	Eden Gardens, Kolkata; Umpires: Sanjay Hazare and Pashchim Pathak
Scorecard	181 (62.4 overs); Akshath Reddy 49 (99); Mohammad Shami 6/71 (24.4 overs)		183/6 (63 overs); Rohan Banerjee 56 (178); Anwar Ahmed 3/68 (20 overs)	Eden Gardens, Kolkata; Umpires: Sanjay Hazare and Pashchim Pathak
Bengal won the toss and elected to field.

22–25 December 2012	Hyderabad	v	Railways	Match Drawn Hyderabad took first innings lead
Scorecard	337 (122 overs); Ashish Reddy 82 (119); Murali Karthik 4/88 (36 overs)		213 (92.4 overs); Sanjay Bangar 43 (122); Amol Shinde 5/78 (36.4 overs)	Rajiv Gandhi International Cricket Stadium, Hyderabad; Umpires: Piyush Khakhar and Umesh Dubey
Scorecard	196/8d (76.5 overs); Akash Bhandari 57* (86); Anureet Singh 3/24 (13.5 overs)		280/7 (70 overs); Nitin Bhille 65* (114); Pragyan Ojha 4/95 (28 overs)	Rajiv Gandhi International Cricket Stadium, Hyderabad; Umpires: Piyush Khakhar and Umesh Dubey
Hyderabad won the toss and elected to bat.

29 December 2012 – 1 January 2013	Rajasthan	v	Hyderabad	Match Drawn Rajasthan took first innings lead
Scorecard	384 (120.3 overs); Vineet Saxena 84 (209); Ashish Reddy 5/67 (22.3 overs)		349 (96.5 overs); Parth Jhala 75* (166); Rituraj Singh 4/86 (24.5 overs)	KL Saini Ground, Jaipur; Umpires: Rohan Pandit and Milind Pathak
Scorecard	329/9d (105 overs); Vineet Saxena 146 (310); Amol Shinde 4/84 (29 overs)		38/0 (12 overs); Akshath Reddy 23* (34)	KL Saini Ground, Jaipur; Umpires: Rohan Pandit and Milind Pathak
Kerala won the toss and elected to field.

=== Statistics ===
Most runs

Player	Mat	Inns	Runs	Ave	SR	HS	100	50
Akshath Reddy	8	15	690	57.50	46.52	196	1	5
Hanuma Vihari	8	14	511	39.30	49.18	191	1	2
Bavanaka Sandeep	6	10	459	57.37	42.34	117	1	4

- Source: ESPNcricinfo

Most wickets

Player	Mat	Inns	Wkts	Ave	Econ	BBI	SR	5WI	10WM
Ashish Reddy	6	10	29	19.24	2.98	6/56	38.7	3	0
Amol Shinde	2	4	14	24.42	3.00	5/78	48.7	1	0
Anwar Ahmed	5	8	11	40.09	2.82	5/44	85.0	1	0

- Source: ESPNcricinfo

== Vijay Hazare Trophy ==
The Hyderabad team, led by Pragyan Ojha, began their campaign in the Vijay Hazare Trophy, a List-A cricket tournament in India, with a loss against the Kerala at Vasco da Gama on 14 February 2013. The Kerala pacers, Sandeep Warrier and Prasanth Parameswaran troubled the Hyderabad and restricted them to 192 while 93-run knock from Rohan Prem helped the Kerala complete a six-wicket victory. In the second match, Ojha and Ashish Reddy restricted the Andhra to 202 but the Hyderabad top-order stumbled to Syed Shahabuddin before Hanuma Vihari and Habeeb Ahmed tried to recover the innings. But, their dismissals set up the win for the Andhra as Paidikalva Vijaykumar wrapped things up to defeat the Hyderabad by two runs. In a rain-hit 25-over match, Dwaraka Ravi Teja's 111 and Akash Bhandari's 78 helped the Hyderabad register an eight-wicket win by chasing the Goa's target of 226 that was set with the help of half-centuries from Swapnil Asnodkar and Sagun Kamat. The centuries from Robin Uthappa and K. L. Rahul helped the Karnataka post 305 while the four-wicket haul from S. L. Akshay helped them to recover from the 140-run partnership between Vihari and Bavanaka Sandeep and defeat the Hyderabad by 47 runs in their fourth match. In the final zonal match, century from Dinesh Karthik set a strong start for Tamil Nadu but Chama Milind struck twice to restrict Tamil Nadu to 262. The Hyderabad started the chase strongly but three run-outs in the middle and Palani Amarnath's three-wicket haul at the end hampered the Hyderabad's chase and helped the Tamil Nadu win by 26 runs as the Hyderabad finished fifth in the South Zone and failed to qualify for the knockout stage with a win and four losses.

=== Points Table ===
South Zone

Team	Pld	W	L	T	NR	Pts	NRR
Karnataka	5	5	0	0	0	20	+0.613
Kerala	5	4	1	0	0	17	+0.244
Andhra	5	3	2	0	0	13	+0.631
Tamil Nadu	5	2	3	0	0	9	+0.337
Hyderabad	5	1	4	0	0	3	-0.543
Goa	5	0	5	0	0	-2	-1.470

- Top two teams advanced to knockout stage.

=== Matches ===
Zonal Stage

14 February 2013	Hyderabad; 192/8 (50 overs)	v	Kerala; 193/4 (39.2 overs)	Kerala won by 6 wickets
Scorecard	Hyderabad; 192/8 (50 overs)	v	Kerala; 193/4 (39.2 overs)	Birla Institute of Technology and Science, Pilani Ground, Vasco da Gama; Umpires: Marcus Couto and Shashank Ranade
Scorecard	Hanuma Vihari 81 (121); Prasanth Parameswaran 4/24 (12 overs)		Rohan Prem 93 (114); Anwar Ahmed 2/33 (8 overs)	Birla Institute of Technology and Science, Pilani Ground, Vasco da Gama; Umpires: Marcus Couto and Shashank Ranade
Kerala won the toss and elected to field.; Kolla Sumanth, Rahul Singh (Hyderabad); Sandeep Warrier and Chovvakkaran Shahid (Kerala) all made their List A debuts.; Points : Kerala 5; Hyderabad -1				Birla Institute of Technology and Science, Pilani Ground, Vasco da Gama; Umpires: Marcus Couto and Shashank Ranade

15 February 2013	Andhra; 202 (48.5 overs)	v	Hyderabad; 200 (49.4 overs)	Andhra won by 2 runs
Scorecard	Andhra; 202 (48.5 overs)	v	Hyderabad; 200 (49.4 overs)	Dr. Rajendra Prasad Stadium, Margao; Umpires: Vilas Bandiwadekar and Umesh Dubey
Scorecard	Bodapati Sumanth 63 (74); Pragyan Ojha 4/24 (10 overs)		Hanuma Vihari 61 (89); Syed Shahabuddin 4/46 (9 overs)	Dr. Rajendra Prasad Stadium, Margao; Umpires: Vilas Bandiwadekar and Umesh Dubey
Andhra won the toss and elected to bat.; Jyothi Krishna (Andhra) made his List-A debut.; Points : Andhra 4; Hyderabad 0				Dr. Rajendra Prasad Stadium, Margao; Umpires: Vilas Bandiwadekar and Umesh Dubey

17 February 2013	Goa; 225/7 (25 overs)	v	Hyderabad; 228/2 (22.5 overs)	Hyderabad won by 8 wickets
Scorecard	Goa; 225/7 (25 overs)	v	Hyderabad; 228/2 (22.5 overs)	Dr. Rajendra Prasad Stadium, Margao; Umpires: Arun Kumar Basa and Adil Palia
Scorecard	Swapnil Asnodkar 70 (50); Akash Bhandari 2/36 (6 overs)		Dwaraka Ravi Teja 111* (67); Robin D'Souza 1/29 (3 overs)	Dr. Rajendra Prasad Stadium, Margao; Umpires: Arun Kumar Basa and Adil Palia
Hyderabad won the toss and elected to field.; Chama Milind (Hyderabad) made his List-A debut.; Points : Hyderabad 4; Goa 0				Dr. Rajendra Prasad Stadium, Margao; Umpires: Arun Kumar Basa and Adil Palia

18 February 2013	Karnataka; 305/9 (50 overs)	v	Hyderabad; 258 (46.4 overs)	Karnataka won by 47 runs
Scorecard	Karnataka; 305/9 (50 overs)	v	Hyderabad; 258 (46.4 overs)	Goa Cricket Association Academy Ground, Porvorim; Umpires: Nandan Phadnis and Anil Dandekar
Scorecard	K. L. Rahul 110 (107); Ashish Reddy 3/88 (12 overs)		Hanuma Vihari 84 (76); S. L. Akshay 4/50 (10 overs)	Goa Cricket Association Academy Ground, Porvorim; Umpires: Nandan Phadnis and Anil Dandekar
Hyderabad won the toss and elected to field.; Points : Karnataka 4; Hyderabad 0				Goa Cricket Association Academy Ground, Porvorim; Umpires: Nandan Phadnis and Anil Dandekar

20 February 2013	Tamil Nadu; 262/9 (50 overs)	v	Hyderabad; 236 (48.2 overs)	Tamil Nadu won by 26 runs
Scorecard	Tamil Nadu; 262/9 (50 overs)	v	Hyderabad; 236 (48.2 overs)	Birla Institute of Technology and Science, Pilani Ground, Vasco da Gama; Umpires: Ajit Datar and Milind Pathak
Scorecard	Dinesh Karthik 119 (119); Ashish Reddy 4/56 (10 overs)		Sundeep Rajan 52 (62); Palani Amarnath 3/49 (9.2 overs)	Birla Institute of Technology and Science, Pilani Ground, Vasco da Gama; Umpires: Ajit Datar and Milind Pathak
Hyderabad won the toss and elected to field.; Praneeth Kumar (Hyderabad); Malolan Rangarajan and Alagh Prathiban (Tamil Nadu) all made their List A debuts.; Points : Tamil Nadu 4; Hyderabad 0				Birla Institute of Technology and Science, Pilani Ground, Vasco da Gama; Umpires: Ajit Datar and Milind Pathak

=== Statistics ===
Most runs

Player	Mat	Inns	Runs	Ave	SR	HS	100	50
Hanuma Vihari	5	5	250	62.50	80.12	84	0	3
Dwaraka Ravi Teja	5	5	179	44.75	87.74	111*	1	0
Bavanaka Sandeep	5	4	117	29.25	83.57	72	0	1

- Source: ESPNcricinfo

Most wickets

Player	Mat	Inns	Wkts	Ave	Econ	BBI	SR	4WI	5WI
Ashish Reddy	5	5	12	24.33	6.66	4/56	21.9	1	0
Chama Milind	3	3	5	28.60	5.72	3/48	30.0	0	0
Mungala Arjun	5	5	5	41.80	4.71	1/37	53.2	0	0

- Source: ESPNcricinfo

== Syed Mushtaq Ali Trophy ==
The Hyderabad team, led by Akshath Reddy, began their campaign in the Syed Mushtaq Ali Trophy, a Twenty20 tournament in India, with a loss against the Kerala at Shimoga on 17 March 2013. Two run-outs and disciplined bowling by the Kerala restricted the Hyderabad to 133 while Nikhilesh Surendran's half-century anchored the chase as the Kerala won by six-wickets. In the second match, the 108-run partnership between Akshath and Tirumalasetti Suman set the platform for the Hyderabad for a big total only to be hampered by the four-wicket haul from Tekkami Atchuta Rao and restricted them to 161 while the collective batting effort from the Andhra batsmen helped the Andhra complete the chase with five-wickets to spare. In the third match, the Hyderabad bowlers started strongly dismissing the Goa openers cheaply but the knocks from Swapnil Asnodkar and Ravikant Shukla helped them to recover to 141 while Darshan Misal and his bowling unit restricted the Hyderabad to 134 and win the match for the Goa by 7 runs. Mayank Agarwal's maiden ton and four-wicket hauls from Krishnappa Gowtham and Manish Pandey set up the Karnataka's 12-run win and hand over the fourth loss for the Hyderabad in as many matches. The collective effort from Suman, Bavanaka Sandeep and Hanuma Vihari helped the Hyderabad set the target of 168 while the three-wicket haul from Akash Bhandari in the middle and Chama Milind's hat-trick at the end helped the Hyderabad secure their first win in the tournament against the Tamil Nadu by eight runs as they finished fifth in the South Zone and failed to qualify for the Super League stage with a win and four losses.

=== Points Table ===
South Zone

Team	Pld	W	L	T	NR	Pts	NRR
Karnataka	5	4	0	1	0	18	+1.353
Kerala	5	4	1	0	0	16	-0.212
Tamil Nadu	5	2	2	1	0	10	+0.279
Andhra	5	2	3	0	0	8	-0.325
Hyderabad	5	1	4	0	0	4	-0.246
Goa	5	1	4	0	0	4	-0.810

- Top two teams advanced to the Super League.
- Points system : W = 4, T/NR = 2, L = 0.

=== Matches ===
Zonal Stage

17 March 2013	Hyderabad; 133/6 (20 overs)	v	Kerala; 134/4 (19.4 overs)	Kerala won by 6 wickets
Scorecard	Hyderabad; 133/6 (20 overs)	v	Kerala; 134/4 (19.4 overs)	Jawaharlal Nehru National College of Engineering Ground, Shimoga; Umpires: Ulhas Gandhe and Pashchim Pathak
Scorecard	Hanuma Vihari 34 (24); Prasanth Parameswaran 2/20 (4 overs)		Nikhilesh Surendran 53 (51); Akash Bhandari 1/21 (4 overs)	Jawaharlal Nehru National College of Engineering Ground, Shimoga; Umpires: Ulhas Gandhe and Pashchim Pathak
Kerala won the toss and elected to field.; Bavanaka Sandeep, Habeeb Ahmed, Chama Milind (Hyderabad); Nikhilesh Surendran and Sandeep Warrier (Kerala) all made their T20 debuts.				Jawaharlal Nehru National College of Engineering Ground, Shimoga; Umpires: Ulhas Gandhe and Pashchim Pathak

18 March 2013	Hyderabad; 161/5 (20 overs)	v	Andhra; 163/5 (19 overs)	Andhra won by 5 wickets
Scorecard	Hyderabad; 161/5 (20 overs)	v	Andhra; 163/5 (19 overs)	P.E.S. Institute of Technology and Management, Shimoga; Umpires: Subrat Das and Pashchim Pathak
Scorecard	Tirumalasetti Suman 85 (56); Tekkami Atchuta Rao 4/32 (4 overs)		K. S. Bharat 36 (17); Praneeth Kumar 1/14 (4 overs)	P.E.S. Institute of Technology and Management, Shimoga; Umpires: Subrat Das and Pashchim Pathak
Andhra won the toss and elected to field.; Koripalli Sreekanth, Tekkami Atchuta Rao (Andhra); Praneeth Kumar (Hyderabad) all made their T20 debuts.				P.E.S. Institute of Technology and Management, Shimoga; Umpires: Subrat Das and Pashchim Pathak

19 March 2013	Goa; 141/9 (20 overs)	v	Hyderabad; 134/9 (20 overs)	Goa won by 7 runs
Scorecard	Goa; 141/9 (20 overs)	v	Hyderabad; 134/9 (20 overs)	Visvesvaraya Iron and Steel Plant Ground, Bhadravati; Umpires: Pashchim Pathak and Milind Pathak
Scorecard	Swapnil Asnodkar 36 (35); Chama Milind 3/21 (4 overs)		Dwaraka Ravi Teja 33 (37); Darshan Misal 3/29 (4 overs)	Visvesvaraya Iron and Steel Plant Ground, Bhadravati; Umpires: Pashchim Pathak and Milind Pathak
Hyderabad won the toss and elected to field.; Suraj Dongre and Darshan Misal (Goa) made their T20 debuts.				Visvesvaraya Iron and Steel Plant Ground, Bhadravati; Umpires: Pashchim Pathak and Milind Pathak

21 March 2013	Karnataka; 185/7 (20 overs)	v	Hyderabad; 173/9 (20 overs)	Karnataka won by 12 runs
Scorecard	Karnataka; 185/7 (20 overs)	v	Hyderabad; 173/9 (20 overs)	Visvesvaraya Iron and Steel Plant Ground, Bhadravati; Umpires: Shashank Ranade and Milind Pathak
Scorecard	Mayank Agarwal 111 (64); Chama Milind 3/13 (4 overs)		Tirumalasetti Suman 36 (28); Krishnappa Gowtham 4/19 (4 overs)	Visvesvaraya Iron and Steel Plant Ground, Bhadravati; Umpires: Shashank Ranade and Milind Pathak
Hyderabad won the toss and elected to field.				Visvesvaraya Iron and Steel Plant Ground, Bhadravati; Umpires: Shashank Ranade and Milind Pathak

22 March 2013	Hyderabad; 167/7 (20 overs)	v	Tamil Nadu; 159/9 (20 overs)	Hyderabad won by 8 runs
Scorecard	Hyderabad; 167/7 (20 overs)	v	Tamil Nadu; 159/9 (20 overs)	P.E.S. Institute of Technology and Management, Shimoga; Umpires: Ulhas Gandhe and Pashchim Pathak
Scorecard	Tirumalasetti Suman 48 (36); Lakshmipathy Balaji 2/24 (4 overs)		Arun Karthik 40 (24); Chama Milind 3/22 (4 overs)	P.E.S. Institute of Technology and Management, Shimoga; Umpires: Ulhas Gandhe and Pashchim Pathak
Tamil Nadu won the toss and elected to field.; Rahul Singh (Hyderabad) made his T20 debut.; Chama Milind (Hyderabad) took a hat-trick.				P.E.S. Institute of Technology and Management, Shimoga; Umpires: Ulhas Gandhe and Pashchim Pathak

=== Statistics ===
Most runs

Player	Mat	Inns	Runs	Ave	SR	HS	100	50
Tirumalasetti Suman	5	5	202	40.40	135.57	85	0	1
Akshath Reddy	5	5	102	20.40	103.03	44	0	0
Bavanaka Sandeep	5	5	94	31.33	151.61	44	0	0

- Source: ESPNcricinfo

Most wickets

Player	Mat	Inns	Wkts	Ave	Econ	BBI	SR	4WI	5WI
Chama Milind	5	5	11	9.81	5.68	3/13	10.3	0	0
Akash Bhandari	5	5	6	22.83	7.21	3/24	19.0	0	0
Praneeth Kumar	3	3	3	22.00	7.33	2/26	18.0	0	0

- Source: ESPNcricinfo

== See also ==
Hyderabad cricket team
Hyderabad Cricket Association
