= 2011–12 Hyderabad C.A. season =

Hyderabad C.A.
2011–12 season
- Coach: Sunil Joshi
- Captain: Dwaraka Ravi Teja
- Ground(s): Rajiv Gandhi International Cricket Stadium, Hyderabad (Capacity: 55,000)
- Syed Mushtaq Ali Trophy: South Zone (4th)
- Ranji Trophy: Quarter-finals (Promoted)
- Vijay Hazare Trophy: Quarter-finals

The 2011–12 season is Hyderabad cricket team's 78th competitive season. The Hyderabad cricket team is senior men's domestic cricket team based in the city of Hyderabad, India, run by the Hyderabad Cricket Association. They represent the region of Telangana in the state of Andhra Pradesh in domestic competitions.

== Competition overview ==
Category	Competition	Format	First match	Last match	Final position	Pld	W	L	D / T / NR	Win %
Senior men's	Syed Mushtaq Ali Trophy	Twenty20 cricket	16 October 2011	21 October 2011	Zonal Stage	5	2	3	0	40%
Senior men's	Ranji Trophy	First-class cricket	3 November 2011	2 January 2012	Quarter-finals, Promoted to Elite Group	7	2	1	4	28.57%
Senior men's	Vijay Hazare Trophy	List A cricket	20 February 2012	7 March 2012	Quarter-finals	6	4	2	0	66.67%

== Squads ==
- Head Coach : Sunil Joshi
- Fielding Coach : Noel David

England Tour Match	Syed Mushtaq Ali Trophy	Ranji Trophy	Vijay Hazare Trophy
Dwaraka Ravi Teja (c); Anwar Ahmed; Ashish Reddy; Neeraj Bist; Ibrahim Khaleel (wk); Pagadala Naidu; Pragyan Ojha; Paramveer Singh; Syed Quadri; Akshath Reddy; Bavanaka Sandeep; Amol Shinde; Tirumalasetti Suman; Hanuma Vihari; Arjun Yadav; Mehdi Hasan	Dwaraka Ravi Teja (c); Anwar Ahmed; Ashish Reddy; Neeraj Bist; Ibrahim Khaleel (wk); Pagadala Naidu; Pragyan Ojha; Paramveer Singh; Syed Quadri; Akshath Reddy; Bavanaka Sandeep; Amol Shinde; Tirumalasetti Suman; Hanuma Vihari; Arjun Yadav	Dwaraka Ravi Teja (c); Lalith Mohan; Anwar Ahmed; Ashish Reddy; Mehdi Hasan; Ibrahim Khaleel (wk); Pagadala Naidu; Paramveer Singh; Syed Quadri; Akshath Reddy; Bavanaka Sandeep; Shashank Nag; Amol Shinde; Hanuma Vihari; Arjun Yadav; Tirumalasetti Suman	Dwaraka Ravi Teja (c); Anwar Ahmed; Ashish Reddy; Mehdi Hasan; Ibrahim Khaleel (wk); Pagadala Naidu; Pragyan Ojha; Paramveer Singh; Syed Quadri; Akshath Reddy; Bavanaka Sandeep; Tirumalasetti Suman; Hanuma Vihari; Vivek Krishna; Arjun Yadav

Joshi replaced M. V. Sridhar as the Hyderabad coach ahead of the 2011–12 season.

Irani Cup

Ojha got selected to the Rest of India squad for the 2011 Irani Cup, a first-class cricket competition in India.

NKP Salve Challenger Trophy

Ojha got selected to the India Blue squad and Suman to the India Green squad for the 2011-12 NKP Salve Challenger Trophy, a List-A cricket tournament in India.

Duleep Trophy

Ojha, Quadri and Akshath got selected to the South Zone squad for the 2011-12 Duleep Trophy, a first-class cricket tournament in India.

Deodhar Trophy

Ashish, Ojha, Ravi Teja and Akshath got selected to the South Zone squad for the 2011-12 Deodhar Trophy, a List-A cricket competition in India.

Indian Premier League

The local franchise, Deccan Chargers retained Yadav, Ashish, Bhandari and Ravi Teja and signed Quadri and Akshath in the player's draft while the Mumbai Indians retained Suman and got Ojha during the trading window from the Deccan Chargers for the 2012 Indian Premier League, a professional Twenty20 cricket league in India.

== England Tour Match ==
The England cricket team began their tour to India with two List A warm-up games against the Hyderabad Cricket Association XI (HCA XI), led by Dwaraka Ravi Teja, at Hyderabad. The HCA XI played their first match on 8 October 2011 as Ravi Bopara's fluent 73 off 82 balls and four-wicket haul by Steven Finn set up a 56-run win for the England. It was much comprehensive win for England in the second warm-up match as Jonny Bairstow's unbeaten century set the target of 368 for the HCA XI while Scott Borthwick's fifer bowled out the Hyderabad XI to 114 that registered the HCA XI's second consecutive loss to the England in as many matches.

=== Matches ===
8 October 2011	England XI; 219 (47.2 overs)	v	(India) Hyderabad Cricket Association XI; 163 (36.5 overs)	England XI won by 56 runs
Scorecard	England XI; 219 (47.2 overs)	v	(India) Hyderabad Cricket Association XI; 163 (36.5 overs)	Rajiv Gandhi International Cricket Stadium, Hyderabad; Umpires: Ammanabrole Nand Kishore and Chettithody Shamshuddin
Scorecard	Ravi Bopara 73 (82); Syed Quadri 3/25 (6 overs)		Arjun Yadav 47 (74); Steven Finn 4/28 (7.5 overs)	Rajiv Gandhi International Cricket Stadium, Hyderabad; Umpires: Ammanabrole Nand Kishore and Chettithody Shamshuddin
England XI won the toss and elected to bat				Rajiv Gandhi International Cricket Stadium, Hyderabad; Umpires: Ammanabrole Nand Kishore and Chettithody Shamshuddin

11 October 2011	England XI; 367/4 (50 overs)	v	(India) Hyderabad Cricket Association XI; 114 (35.3 overs)	England XI won by 253 runs
Scorecard	England XI; 367/4 (50 overs)	v	(India) Hyderabad Cricket Association XI; 114 (35.3 overs)	Rajiv Gandhi International Cricket Stadium, Hyderabad; Umpires: Kusha Prakash and Ammanabrole Nand Kishore
Scorecard	Jonny Bairstow 104* (53); Mehdi Hasan 3/63 (10 overs)		Akshath Reddy 37 (53); Scott Borthwick 5/31 (10 overs)	Rajiv Gandhi International Cricket Stadium, Hyderabad; Umpires: Kusha Prakash and Ammanabrole Nand Kishore
England XI won the toss and elected to bat				Rajiv Gandhi International Cricket Stadium, Hyderabad; Umpires: Kusha Prakash and Ammanabrole Nand Kishore

== Syed Mushtaq Ali Trophy ==
The Hyderabad team, led by Dwaraka Ravi Teja, began their campaign in the Syed Mushtaq Ali Trophy, a Twenty20 tournament in India, with a loss against the Kerala at Chennai on 16 October 2011. The Hyderabad batsmen were troubled by the Kerala bowlers at the start though the steady half century from Syed Quadri pushed them to 119 while the Kerala's chase was perfectly anchored by VA Jagadeesh's 49 that helped them to survive the scare of losing four quick wickets at the end to complete the chase with three wickets to spare. Ravi Teja's 81 off 55 balls led the Hyderabad to 160 while Pragyan Ojha and Quadri hampered the Andhra's chase as the Hyderabad registered a 35-run win in their second match. Second consecutive half century from Ravi Teja and a combined effort from the Hyderabad bowlers helped the Hyderabad register a nine-wicket win over the Goa in their third match. In the fourth match, Robin Uthappa's knock of 92 in 36 balls destroyed the Hyderabad bowling attack as he led Karnataka to 202. In reply, the Hyderabad lost wickets in the middle to the Karnataka spinners as they were bowled out for 112 and register their second loss in the tournament. A solid partnership from the openers and a combined performance from the bowlers helped the Tamil Nadu register a 63-run win against the Hyderabad in their final zonal match as the Hyderabad finished fourth in the South Zone and failed to qualify for the knockout stage with two wins and three losses.

=== Points Table ===
South Zone

Team	Pld	W	L	T	NR	Pts	NRR
Tamil Nadu	5	4	1	0	0	16	+1.432
Karnataka	5	4	1	0	0	16	+1.155
Kerala	5	2	2	0	1	10	+0.169
Hyderabad	5	2	3	0	0	8	-0.907
Andhra	5	1	3	0	1	6	-1.088
Goa	5	1	4	0	0	4	-0.931

- Top two teams advanced to knockout stage.
- Points system : W = 4, T/NR = 2, L = 0.

=== Matches ===
Zonal Stage

16 October 2011	Hyderabad; 119/7 (20 overs)	v	Kerala; 120/7 (20 overs)	Kerala won by 3 wickets
Scorecard	Hyderabad; 119/7 (20 overs)	v	Kerala; 120/7 (20 overs)	M. A. Chidambaram Stadium, Chennai; Umpires: Amardeep Pathania and Anil Dandekar
Scorecard	Syed Quadri 50 (52); Prasanth Parameswaran 2/13 (4 overs)		VA Jagadeesh 49 (42); Anwar Ahmed 2/12 (4 overs)	M. A. Chidambaram Stadium, Chennai; Umpires: Amardeep Pathania and Anil Dandekar
Hyderabad won the toss and elected to bat.; Anwar Ahmed (Hyderabad); Sachin Baby, Sanju Samson and Unnikrishnan Manukrishnan (Kerala) all made their T20 debuts.				M. A. Chidambaram Stadium, Chennai; Umpires: Amardeep Pathania and Anil Dandekar

17 October 2011	Hyderabad; 160/4 (20 overs)	v	Andhra; 125/8 (20 overs)	Hyderabad won by 35 runs
Scorecard	Hyderabad; 160/4 (20 overs)	v	Andhra; 125/8 (20 overs)	M. A. Chidambaram Stadium, Chennai; Umpires: Bharati Vij and Nikhil Patwardhan
Scorecard	Dwaraka Ravi Teja 81* (55); Sirla Srinivas 1/8 (2 overs)		Manoj Sai 35 (30); Pragyan Ojha 2/12 (4 overs)	M. A. Chidambaram Stadium, Chennai; Umpires: Bharati Vij and Nikhil Patwardhan
Hyderabad won the toss and elected to bat.; Bandi Arun Kumar (Andhra) made his T20 debut.				M. A. Chidambaram Stadium, Chennai; Umpires: Bharati Vij and Nikhil Patwardhan

18 October 2011	Goa; 130 (19.2 overs)	v	Hyderabad; 131/1 (17.2 overs)	Hyderabad won by 9 wickets
Scorecard	Goa; 130 (19.2 overs)	v	Hyderabad; 131/1 (17.2 overs)	TI Cycles Ground, Murugappa, Chennai; Umpires: Anil Dandekar and Amardeep Pathania
Scorecard	Abhishek Raut 31 (25); Syed Quadri 3/25 (3 overs)		Dwaraka Ravi Teja 68* (49); Amit Yadav 1/28 (4 overs)	TI Cycles Ground, Murugappa, Chennai; Umpires: Anil Dandekar and Amardeep Pathania
Goa won the toss and elected to bat.; Gajanan Azgaonkar (Goa) made his T20 debut.				TI Cycles Ground, Murugappa, Chennai; Umpires: Anil Dandekar and Amardeep Pathania

20 October 2011	Karnataka; 202/8 (20 overs)	v	Hyderabad; 122 (16.2 overs)	Karnataka won by 80 runs
Scorecard	Karnataka; 202/8 (20 overs)	v	Hyderabad; 122 (16.2 overs)	Sri Ramachandra Medical College Ground, Chennai; Umpires: Mukund Mandale and Rohan Pandit
Scorecard	Robin Uthappa 92 (36); Pragyan Ojha 4/29 (4 overs)		Ashish Reddy 29* (15); K. P. Appanna 3/31 (4 overs)	Sri Ramachandra Medical College Ground, Chennai; Umpires: Mukund Mandale and Rohan Pandit
Karnataka won the toss and elected to bat.				Sri Ramachandra Medical College Ground, Chennai; Umpires: Mukund Mandale and Rohan Pandit

21 October 2011	Tamil Nadu; 161/5 (20 overs)	v	Hyderabad; 98/8 (20 overs)	Tamil Nadu won by 63 runs
Scorecard	Tamil Nadu; 161/5 (20 overs)	v	Hyderabad; 98/8 (20 overs)	Sri Ramachandra Medical College Ground, Chennai; Umpires: Abhijit Bengeri and Rajesh Deshpande
Scorecard	Srikkanth Anirudha 35 (29); Tirumalasetti Suman 2/27 (4 overs)		Dwaraka Ravi Teja 18 (24); Yo Mahesh 3/6 (4 overs)	Sri Ramachandra Medical College Ground, Chennai; Umpires: Abhijit Bengeri and Rajesh Deshpande
Tamil Nadu won the toss and elected to bat.				Sri Ramachandra Medical College Ground, Chennai; Umpires: Abhijit Bengeri and Rajesh Deshpande

=== Statistics ===
Most runs

Player	Mat	Inns	Runs	Ave	SR	HS	100	50
Dwaraka Ravi Teja	5	5	179	59.66	119.33	81*	0	2
Tirumalasetti Suman	5	5	91	18.20	124.65	45	0	0
Arjun Yadav	5	5	83	20.75	100.00	40	0	0

- Source: ESPNcricinfo

Most wickets

Player	Mat	Inns	Wkts	Ave	Econ	BBI	SR	4WI	5WI
Pragyan Ojha	5	5	8	12.75	5.36	4/29	14.2	1	0
Syed Quadri	5	5	6	16.16	8.08	3/25	12.0	0	0
Tirumalasetti Suman	5	4	4	21.50	6.61	2/27	19.5	0	0

- Source: ESPNcricinfo

== Ranji Trophy ==
The Hyderabad team, led by Dwaraka Ravi Teja, began their campaign in the Ranji Trophy, the premier first-class cricket tournament in India, with a draw against the Jharkhand at Hyderabad on 3 November 2011. They finished inside top-2 of Group B in the Plate League to advance to the knockout stage with two wins, two draws and a loss. They got promoted to the Elite-League for the 2012–13 Ranji Trophy after defeating the Vidarbha through the first-innings lead and also advanced to the Elite knockout stage. They were eliminated in the quarter-final where the Rajasthan was advanced through the first innings lead in the drawn match.

=== Points Table ===
Plate League Group B

Team	Pld	W	L	D	A	Pts	Q
Maharashtra	5	3	0	2	0	22	1.519
Hyderabad	5	2	1	2	0	16	1.677
Goa	5	1	2	2	0	9	0.963
Jharkhand	5	1	1	3	0	9	0.691
Jammu & Kashmir	5	0	1	4	0	8	0.708
Assam	5	0	2	3	0	6	0.719

- Top two teams advanced to knockout stage.
- Points system : Win by an innings or 10 wickets = 6, Win = 5, Draw with first innings lead = 3, Draw with first innings deficit = 1, No Result = 1, Loss = 0.

=== Knockout stage ===
Plate Semifinals
PA1	Vidarbha	531
PB2	Hyderabad	486/8
PB1	Maharashtra	415 & 283/5
PA2	Himachal Pradesh	236

Quarterfinals
PB2	Hyderabad	144 & 431/2d
A3	Rajasthan	421 & 25/0
A2	Karnataka	151 & 262
B3	Haryana	272 & 144/4
B2	Madhya Pradesh	192 & 473/3d
A1	Mumbai	434 & 113/1
PB1	Maharashtra	232 & 322/4d
B1	Tamil Nadu	415 & 45/1

Semifinals
A3	Rajasthan	89 & 192
B3	Haryana	97 & 120
A1	Mumbai	157 & 88/3
B1	Tamil Nadu	359 & 331/8d

Final
A3	Rajasthan	621 & 204/5d
B1	Tamil Nadu	295 & 8/2

=== Matches ===
Group Stage

3–6 November 2011	Hyderabad	v	Jharkhand	Match Drawn Hyderabad took first innings lead
Scorecard	416 (156.5 overs); Syed Quadri 105 (204); Shankar Rao 4/69 (28.5 overs)		280 (115.3 overs); Ishank Jaggi 81 (162); Lalith Mohan 5/55 (29.3 overs)	Rajiv Gandhi International Cricket Stadium, Hyderabad; Umpires: Sanjeev Dua and Nikhil Patwardhan; Player of the match: Syed Quadri (Hyderabad)
Scorecard	113/2d (26 overs); Dwaraka Ravi Teja 64* (73); Shankar Rao 2/33 (11 overs)		74/1 (20 overs); Rameez Nemat 37* (56); Anwar Ahmed 1/17 (6 overs)	Rajiv Gandhi International Cricket Stadium, Hyderabad; Umpires: Sanjeev Dua and Nikhil Patwardhan; Player of the match: Syed Quadri (Hyderabad)
Hyderabad won the toss and elected to bat.; Mehdi Hasan, Anwar Ahmed (Hyderabad); Kumar Deobrat and Rahul Mishra (Jharkhand) made their first-class debuts.

10–13 November 2011	Hyderabad	v	Maharashtra	Maharashtra won by an innings and 6 runs
Scorecard	124 (53 overs); Hanuma Vihari 38 (54); Akshay Darekar 5/48 (23 overs)		184 (63.1 overs); Kedar Jadhav 62 (43); Syed Quadri 5/28 (10.1 overs)	Rajiv Gandhi International Cricket Stadium, Hyderabad; Umpires: Amardeep Pathania and Suresh Shastri; Player of the match: Akshay Darekar (Maharashtra)
Scorecard	54 (34 overs); Akshath Reddy 27 (73); Akshay Darekar 8/20 (15 overs)			Rajiv Gandhi International Cricket Stadium, Hyderabad; Umpires: Amardeep Pathania and Suresh Shastri; Player of the match: Akshay Darekar (Maharashtra)
Hyderabad won the toss and elected to bat.; Domnic Joseph (Maharashtra) made his first-class debut.

17–20 November 2011	Assam	v	Hyderabad	Hyderabad won by an innings and 78 runs
Scorecard	227 (105.4 overs); Sib Sankar Roy 80 (252); Anwar Ahmed 4/38 (22 overs)		474/6d (143 overs); Akshath Reddy 112 (255); Tarjinder Singh 2/64 (23 overs)	Nehru Stadium, Guwahati; Umpires: Mukund Mandale and Umesh Dubey; Player of the match: Ibrahim Khaleel (Hyderabad)
Scorecard	169 (73.4 overs); Gokul Sharma 38 (95); Lalith Mohan 5/42 (24.4 overs)			Nehru Stadium, Guwahati; Umpires: Mukund Mandale and Umesh Dubey; Player of the match: Ibrahim Khaleel (Hyderabad)
Hyderabad won the toss and elected to field.; Roshan Alam (Assam) made his first-class debut.

29 November – 2 December 2011	Goa	v	Hyderabad	Hyderabad won by an innings and 157 runs
Scorecard	147 (60.2 overs); Abhishek Raut 41 (78); Mohammed Khader 3/19 (12.2 overs)		408 (165 overs); Akshath Reddy 118 (241); Saurabh Bandekar 4/98 (40 overs)	Goa Cricket Association Academy Ground, Porvorim; Umpires: Piyush Khakhar and Bharati Vij; Player of the match: Akshath Reddy (Hyderabad)
Scorecard	104 (34.1 overs); Swapnil Asnodkar 24 (46); Pagadala Naidu 4/16 (6.1 overs)			Goa Cricket Association Academy Ground, Porvorim; Umpires: Piyush Khakhar and Bharati Vij; Player of the match: Akshath Reddy (Hyderabad)
Hyderabad won the toss and elected to field.

6–9 December 2011	Hyderabad	v	Jammu & Kashmir	Match Drawn Jammu & Kashmir took first innings lead
Scorecard	311 (118.1 overs); Syed Quadri 112 (234); Parvez Rasool 2/89 (38 overs)		365 (143.3 overs); Ian Dev Singh 168* (339); Lalith Mohan 6/109 (48.3 overs)	Rajiv Gandhi International Cricket Stadium, Hyderabad; Umpires: Navdeep Singh and Piyush Khakhar; Player of the match: Ian Dev Singh (Jammu & Kashmir)
Scorecard	296/2 (82 overs); Tirumalasetti Suman 160* (263); Ram Dayal 1/41 (16 overs)			Rajiv Gandhi International Cricket Stadium, Hyderabad; Umpires: Navdeep Singh and Piyush Khakhar; Player of the match: Ian Dev Singh (Jammu & Kashmir)
Hyderabad won the toss and elected to bat.

Plate League Semi-final

21–24 December 2011	Vidarbha	v	Hyderabad	Match Drawn Hyderabad advanced on faster scoring rate
Scorecard	531 (191.1 overs); Amol Jungade 115 (241); Syed Quadri 3/97 (37 overs)		486/8 (166 overs); Arjun Yadav 128 (275); Amol Jungade 2/91 (30 overs)	Vidarbha Cricket Association Ground, Nagpur; Umpires: Suresh Shastri and Amiesh Saheba; Player of the match: Syed Quadri (Hyderabad)
Vidarbha won the toss and elected to bat.

Quarter-final

2–5 January 2012	Rajasthan	v	Hyderabad	Match Drawn Rajasthan advanced on first innings lead
Scorecard	421 (167.1 overs); Aakash Chopra 142 (450); Mehdi Hasan 5/62 (33.1 overs)		144 (55 overs); Dwaraka Ravi Teja 67 (101); Gajendra Singh 4/28 (16 overs)	Rajiv Gandhi International Cricket Stadium, Hyderabad; Umpires: Krishna Hariharan and Vineet Kulkarni
Scorecard	25/0 (20 overs); Vineet Saxena 16* (57)		431/2d (98 overs) (f/o); Dwaraka Ravi Teja 185* (293); Pankaj Singh 1/113 (28 overs)	Rajiv Gandhi International Cricket Stadium, Hyderabad; Umpires: Krishna Hariharan and Vineet Kulkarni
Rajasthan won the toss and elected to bat.

=== Statistics ===
Most runs

Player	Mat	Inns	Runs	Ave	SR	HS	100	50
Akshath Reddy	7	11	687	68.70	51.26	151	4	2
Dwaraka Ravi Teja	7	11	522	58.00	58.58	185*	2	3
Bavanaka Sandeep	7	10	429	53.62	42.68	112	1	3

- Source: ESPNcricinfo

Most wickets

Player	Mat	Inns	Wkts	Ave	Econ	BBI	SR	5WI	10WM
Lalith Mohan	6	9	25	23.24	2.38	6/109	58.4	3	0
Anwar Ahmed	7	10	20	20.90	2.38	4/38	52.5	0	0
Pagadala Naidu	7	11	14	30.92	2.52	4/16	73.4	0	0

- Source: ESPNcricinfo

== Vijay Hazare Trophy ==
The Hyderabad team, led by Dwaraka Ravi Teja, began their campaign in the Vijay Hazare Trophy, a List-A cricket tournament in India, with a win against the Kerala at Bengaluru on 20 February 2012. The Kerala put up a strong total with the century from Rohan Prem but the partnership between Akshath Reddy and Ibrahim Khaleel helped the Hyderabad chase down the target with two wickets to spare. The incisive fifer from Pragyan Ojha helped bowl out the Andhra for 107 as the Hyderabad eased to a six wicket win in their second match. Swapnil Asnodkar's knock of 127 helped the Goa set the target of 311 but the unbeaten ton from Ravi Teja and a quick fifty from Ashish Reddy helped the Hyderabad see off their target with five overs to spare and secure their third win in as many matches. The Hyderabad lost their first match in this tournament as Robin Uthappa's 120 and Ganesh Satish's 90 helped the Karnataka set a tall target of 343. In reply, Ravi Teja's century went in vain as the six-wicket haul from Ronit More troubled the Hyderabad who managed only 240. They finished inside top-2 in the South Zone with four wins and a loss to advance to the knockout stage as they upset the Tamil Nadu by 36 runs in their final zonal match. The opening stand of 151 between Ravi Teja and Tirumalasetti Suman helped the Hyderabad set the target of 334. It was Ravi Teja again whose fifer did the damage as the Tamil Nadu were bowled out for 297. The Hyderabad were eliminated in the quarter-final as Bipul Sharma and Rahul Sharma restricted the Hyderabad to 175 and set up the Punjab's five-wicket win.

=== Points Table ===
South Zone

Team	Pld	W	L	T	NR	Pts	NRR
Karnataka	5	4	1	0	0	18	+1.388
Hyderabad	5	4	1	0	0	16	+0.546
Tamil Nadu	5	3	2	0	0	14	+0.315
Goa	5	2	3	0	0	9	-0.295
Kerala	5	1	4	0	0	2	-0.803
Andhra	5	1	4	0	0	1	-1.166

- Top two teams advanced to knockout stage.

=== Knockout stage ===
Pre-Quarterfinals
WZ2	Maharashtra	186/9 (50 overs)
NZ2	Punjab	192/8 (48.2 overs)
EZ2	Assam	94 (32.5 overs)
NZ1	Delhi	96/2 (20.2 overs)

Quarterfinals
NZ2	Punjab	179/5 (41.1 overs)
SZ2	Hyderabad	175 (49.2 overs)
EZ1	Bengal	230/8 (45 overs)
CZ2	Madhya Pradesh	215 (44.3 overs)
SZ1	Karnataka	178/9 (50 overs)
WZ1	Mumbai	179/1 (29.1 overs)
CZ1	Railways	175 (49.1 overs)
NZ1	Delhi	178/3 (38.4 overs)

Semifinals
NZ2	Punjab	205/8 (50 overs)
EZ1	Bengal	208/7 (47.5 overs)
WZ1	Mumbai	295/5 (50 overs)
NZ1	Delhi	155 (45 overs)

Final
EZ1	Bengal	252/4 (46.1 overs)
WZ1	Mumbai	248 (49.2 overs)

=== Matches ===
Zonal Stage

20 February 2012	Kerala; 266/6 (50 overs)	v	Hyderabad; 267/8 (48.3 overs)	Hyderabad won by 2 wickets
Scorecard	Kerala; 266/6 (50 overs)	v	Hyderabad; 267/8 (48.3 overs)	Jain International Residential School Ground, Bengaluru; Umpires: Navdeep Singh and Anil Chaudhary
Scorecard	Rohan Prem 113* (124); Ashish Reddy 2/51 (9 overs)		Akshath Reddy 110* (104); Nizar Niyas 3/47 (8.3 overs)	Jain International Residential School Ground, Bengaluru; Umpires: Navdeep Singh and Anil Chaudhary
Kerala won the toss and elected to bat.; Anwar Ahmed (Hyderabad); Abhishek Mohan and Sachin Mohan (Kerala) all made their List A debuts.; Points : Hyderabad 4; Kerala 0				Jain International Residential School Ground, Bengaluru; Umpires: Navdeep Singh and Anil Chaudhary

21 February 2012	Andhra; 107 (26.3 overs)	v	Hyderabad; 111/4 (22.4 overs)	Hyderabad won by 6 wickets
Scorecard	Andhra; 107 (26.3 overs)	v	Hyderabad; 111/4 (22.4 overs)	M. Chinnaswamy Stadium, Bengaluru; Umpires: Amardeep Pathania and Kamlesh Sharma
Scorecard	A. G. Pradeep 34 (37); Pragyan Ojha 5/19 (7.3 overs)		Dwaraka Ravi Teja 42 (55); Bodavarapu Sudhakar 2/24 (5.4 overs)	M. Chinnaswamy Stadium, Bengaluru; Umpires: Amardeep Pathania and Kamlesh Sharma
Andhra won the toss and elected to bat.; Points : Hyderabad 5; Andhra -1				M. Chinnaswamy Stadium, Bengaluru; Umpires: Amardeep Pathania and Kamlesh Sharma

23 February 2012	Goa; 310/9 (50 overs)	v	Hyderabad; 311/5 (45 overs)	Hyderabad won by 5 wickets
Scorecard	Goa; 310/9 (50 overs)	v	Hyderabad; 311/5 (45 overs)	Rajinder Singh Institute Ground, Bengaluru; Umpires: Krishnamachari Bharatan and Amardeep Pathania
Scorecard	Swapnil Asnodkar 127 (124); Ashish Reddy 5/68 (10 overs)		Dwaraka Ravi Teja 119* (117); Robin D'Souza 2/68 (9 overs)	Rajinder Singh Institute Ground, Bengaluru; Umpires: Krishnamachari Bharatan and Amardeep Pathania
Goa won the toss and elected to bat.; Points : Hyderabad 4; Goa 0				Rajinder Singh Institute Ground, Bengaluru; Umpires: Krishnamachari Bharatan and Amardeep Pathania

24 February 2012	Karnataka; 343/7 (50 overs)	v	Hyderabad; 240 (44 overs)	Karnataka won by 103 runs
Scorecard	Karnataka; 343/7 (50 overs)	v	Hyderabad; 240 (44 overs)	Jain International Residential School Ground, Bengaluru; Umpires: Kamlesh Sharma and Piyush Khakhar
Scorecard	Robin Uthappa 120 (99); Dwaraka Ravi Teja 2/42 (6 overs)		Dwaraka Ravi Teja 110 (116); Ronit More 5/31 (7 overs)	Jain International Residential School Ground, Bengaluru; Umpires: Kamlesh Sharma and Piyush Khakhar
Hyderabad won the toss and elected to field.; Points : Karnataka 5; Hyderabad -1				Jain International Residential School Ground, Bengaluru; Umpires: Kamlesh Sharma and Piyush Khakhar

26 February 2012	Hyderabad; 333/9 (50 overs)	v	Tamil Nadu; 297 (47.2 overs)	Hyderabad won by 36 runs
Scorecard	Hyderabad; 333/9 (50 overs)	v	Tamil Nadu; 297 (47.2 overs)	Rajinder Singh Institute Ground, Bengaluru; Umpires: Anil Chaudhary and Navdeep Singh
Scorecard	Tirumalasetti Suman 122 (117); Arun Karthik 2/9 (2 overs)		Abhinav Mukund 104 (109); Dwaraka Ravi Teja 5/45 (8.2 overs)	Rajinder Singh Institute Ground, Bengaluru; Umpires: Anil Chaudhary and Navdeep Singh
Hyderabad won the toss and elected to bat.; Sundeep Rajan (Hyderabad) made his List A debut.; Points : Hyderabad 4; Tamil Nadu 0				Rajinder Singh Institute Ground, Bengaluru; Umpires: Anil Chaudhary and Navdeep Singh

Quarter-final

7 March 2012	Hyderabad; 175 (49.2 overs)	v	Punjab; 179/5 (41.1 overs)	Punjab won by 5 wickets
Scorecard	Hyderabad; 175 (49.2 overs)	v	Punjab; 179/5 (41.1 overs)	Palam A Stadium, New Delhi; Umpires: Amardeep Pathania and Sudhir Asnani; Player of the match: Bipul Sharma (Punjab)
Scorecard	Ibrahim Khaleel 46 (51); Bipul Sharma 4/31 (10 overs)		Chandan Madan 78* (120); Anwar Ahmed 2/19 (4 overs)	Palam A Stadium, New Delhi; Umpires: Amardeep Pathania and Sudhir Asnani; Player of the match: Bipul Sharma (Punjab)
Hyderabad won the toss and elected to bat.; Ravi Kiran (Hyderabad) and Manish Bhatia (Punjab) made their List A debuts.				Palam A Stadium, New Delhi; Umpires: Amardeep Pathania and Sudhir Asnani; Player of the match: Bipul Sharma (Punjab)

=== Statistics ===
Most runs

Player	Mat	Inns	Runs	Ave	SR	HS	100	50
Dwaraka Ravi Teja	6	6	361	72.20	86.15	119*	2	1
Akshath Reddy	6	6	259	51.80	90.55	110*	1	1
Tirumalasetti Suman	6	6	205	34.16	86.86	122	1	0

- Source: ESPNcricinfo

Most wickets

Player	Mat	Inns	Wkts	Ave	Econ	BBI	SR	4WI	5WI
Ashish Reddy	6	5	11	21.63	6.26	5/68	20.7	0	1
Pragyan Ojha	6	6	9	32.44	5.15	5/19	37.7	0	1
Dwaraka Ravi Teja	6	4	8	18.75	5.11	5/45	22.0	0	1

- Source: ESPNcricinfo

== See also ==
Hyderabad cricket team
Hyderabad Cricket Association
