= English cricket team in India in 2011–12 =

International cricket tour

	India	England
- Dates: 14 October 2011 – 29 October 2011
Captains	Mahendra Singh Dhoni	Alastair Cook

One Day International series
- Results: India won the 5-match series 5–0
Most runs	Virat Kohli (270)	Jonathan Trott (202)
Most wickets	Ravindra Jadeja (11)	Steven Finn (8)
- Player of the series: Mahendra Singh Dhoni (Ind)

Twenty20 International series
- Results: England won the 1-match series 1–0
Most runs	Suresh Raina (39)	Kevin Pietersen (53)
Most wickets	Ravindra Jadeja (1)	Steven Finn (3)

The England cricket team toured India from 14 October to 29 October 2011. The tour consisted of one Twenty20 International (T20I) and five One Day Internationals (ODIs).

== Squads ==
ODIs		T20I	
India	England	India	England
Mahendra Singh Dhoni (c & wk); Gautam Gambhir; Ajinkya Rahane; Virat Kohli; Suresh Raina; Manoj Tiwary; Ravindra Jadeja; Parthiv Patel; Ravichandran Ashwin; Praveen Kumar; Vinay Kumar; Umesh Yadav; Abhimanyu Mithun; Varun Aaron; Sreenath Aravind; Rahul Sharma	Alastair Cook (c); Jonny Bairstow; Ian Bell; Ravi Bopara; Kevin Pietersen; Jonathan Trott; Craig Kieswetter (wk); Tim Bresnan; Graeme Swann; Steven Finn; Jade Dernbach; Chris Woakes; Samit Patel; Scott Borthwick; Stuart Meaker; Jos Buttler	Mahendra Singh Dhoni (c & wk); Ajinkya Rahane; Virat Kohli; Suresh Raina; Manoj Tiwary; Ravindra Jadeja; Yusuf Pathan; Ravichandran Ashwin; Praveen Kumar; Vinay Kumar; Umesh Yadav; Robin Uthappa; Varun Aaron; Sreenath Aravind; Rahul Sharma	Graeme Swann (c); Jonny Bairstow; Ian Bell; Ravi Bopara; Kevin Pietersen; Jonathan Trott; Craig Kieswetter (wk); Tim Bresnan; Alastair Cook; Steven Finn; Jade Dernbach; Chris Woakes; Samit Patel; Scott Borthwick; Stuart Meaker; Jos Buttler

== Tour matches ==
=== Hyderabad Cricket Association XI v England XI ===
8 October
Scorecard

England XI; 219 (47.2 overs)	v	Hyderabad Cricket Association XI; 163 (36.5 overs)
Ravi Bopara 73 (82); Syed Quadri 3/25 (6 overs)		Arjun Yadav 47 (74); Steven Finn 4/28 (7.5 overs)

England XI won by 56 runs
Gymkhana Ground, Hyderabad
Umpires: Ammanabrole Nand Kishore and SS Shamsuddin

- England XI won the toss and elected to bat

=== Hyderabad Cricket Association XI v England XI ===
11 October
Scorecard

England XI; 367/4 (50 overs)	v	Hyderabad Cricket Association XI; 114 (35.3 overs)
Jonny Bairstow 104* (53); Medhi Hasan 3/63 (10 overs)		Akshath Reddy 37 (53); Scott Borthwick 5/31 (10 overs)

England XI won by 253 runs
Gymkhana Ground, Hyderabad
Umpires: Kusha Prakash and Ammanabrole Nand Kishore

- England XI won the toss and elected to bat

== ODI series ==
=== 1st ODI ===
14 October (D/N)
Scorecard

India; 300/7 (50 overs)	v	England; 174 (36.1 overs)
MS Dhoni 87* (70); Graeme Swann 1/35 (10 overs)		Alastair Cook 60 (63); Ravindra Jadeja 3/34 (7 overs)

India won by 126 runs
Rajiv Gandhi International Stadium, Uppal Hyderabad
Umpires: Billy Bowden (NZ) and Shavir Tarapore (IND)
Player of the match: MS Dhoni (Ind)

- India won the toss and elected to bat first

=== 2nd ODI ===
17 October (D/N)
Scorecard

England; 237 (48.2 overs)	v	India; 238/2 (36.4 overs)
Kevin Pietersen 46 (55); Vinay Kumar 4/30 (9 overs)		Virat Kohli 112* (98); Tim Bresnan 2/41 (7 overs)

India won by 8 wickets
Feroz Shah Kotla, Delhi
Umpires: Billy Bowden (NZ) and Shavir Tarapore (IND)
Player of the match: Virat Kohli (Ind)

- England won the toss and elected to bat

=== 3rd ODI ===
20 October (D/N)
Scorecard

England; 298/4 (50 overs)	v	India; 300/5 (49.2 overs)
Jonathan Trott 98* (116); Virat Kohli 1/20 (3 overs)		Ajinkya Rahane 91 (104); Steven Finn 2/44 (10 overs)

India won by 5 wickets
Punjab Cricket Association Stadium, Mohali Chandigarh
Umpires: Sudhir Asnani (Ind) and Billy Bowden (NZ)
Player of the match: Ajinkya Rahane (Ind)

- England won the toss and elected to bat

=== 4th ODI ===
23 October (D/N)
Scorecard

England; 220 (46.1 overs)	v	India; 223/4 (40.1 overs)
Tim Bresnan 45 (45); Varun Aaron 3/24 (6.1 overs)		Virat Kohli 86* (99); Steven Finn 3/45 (10 overs)

India won by 6 wickets
Wankhede Stadium, Mumbai
Umpires: Sudhir Asnani (Ind) & Billy Bowden (NZ)
Player of the match: Suresh Raina (Ind)

- England won the toss and elected to bat.

=== 5th ODI ===
25 October (D/N)
Scorecard

India; 271/8 (50 overs)	v	England; 176 (37 overs)
Mahendra Singh Dhoni 75* (69); Samit Patel 3/57 (9 overs)		Craig Kieswetter 63 (64); Ravindra Jadeja 4/33 (8 overs)

India won by 95 runs
Eden Gardens, Kolkata
Umpires: Sudhir Asnani (Ind) and Billy Bowden (NZ)
Player of the match: Ravindra Jadeja (Ind)

- England won the toss and elected to field

== T20I series ==
=== Only T20I ===
29 October (D/N)
Scorecard

India; 120/9 (20 overs)	v	England; 121/4 (18.4 overs)
Suresh Raina 39 (29); Steven Finn 3/22 (4 overs)		Kevin Pietersen 53 (39); Ravindra Jadeja 1/9 (4 overs)

England won by 6 wickets
Eden Gardens, Kolkata
Umpires: Sudhir Asnani (Ind) & S Ravi (Ind)
Player of the match: Kevin Pietersen (Eng)

- India won the toss and elected to bat
- Manoj Tiwary (Ind) made his T20I debut.
