= Shankar Rao =

Shankar Rao may refer to

- B. Shankar Rao (born 1922), Indian flautist.
- P. Shankar Rao, Minister and M.L.A from Cantonment constituency.
- Shankar Rao Kharat, Marathi language writer.
- Shankar Rao (cricketer) (born 1982), Indian cricketer.
- Shankar Rao (1984–2024), Indian Maoist militant.
- Shankar Rao (actor) (died 2021), Indian actor
