= Sirla Srinivas =

Indian cricketer (born 1992)

Personal information
- Born: 25 August 1992 (age 34); Srikakulam, India
- Batting: Right handed
- Bowling: Right arm offbreak

Domestic team information
- Years: Team
- 2011–12: Andhra
- Source: ESPNcricinfo, 30 January 2017

Sirla Srinivas (born 25 August 1992) is an Indian cricketer. He made his List A debut for Andhra in the 2011–12 Vijay Hazare Trophy on 20 February 2012.
