= P.E.S. Institute of Technology and Management =

Engineering and management college in Karnataka, India

- Motto: Education for the real world
- Established: 2007
- Affiliations: VTU
- Principal: Dr.Swamy D R
- Undergraduates: BE
- Postgraduates: MBA and MCA
- Location: Shivamogga, Karnataka, India
- Website: www.pestrust.edu.in/pesitm

P.E.S. Institute of Technology and Management is an engineering and management college located in Shivamogga, Karnataka, India. It is affiliated to the Visvesvaraya Technological University, Belgaum.

== About ==
The institute provides support to research and development activities, and is presently offering:

- Ten UG courses
- Two PG Programs: MBA and MCA programme
- Ph.D. research centres

== Certification ==
PESITM is an ISO 9001:2015 certified institute.

Quality Management System of PES Institute of Technology & Management, Shivamogga complies with the requirements of ISO 9001:2015.

This certificate is valid concerning all activities related to educational services offering four-year B.E programmes in Civil Engg, CSE, EEE, ECE, ISE and ME and 2 year MBA programme in specializations such as marketing, finance and human resources.

== Courses offered ==
UG Programs

- Civil Engineering
- Computer Science and Engineering
- Electrical and Electronics Engineering
- Electronics and Communications Engineering
- Information Science and Engineering
- Mechanical Engineering
- Artificial Intelligence and Machine Learning
- Computer Engineering
- Computer Science and Engineering(Data Science)
- Computer Science and Design

PG programs

- Master of Computer Application
- Master of Business Administration

== Recent activities ==
- 'Prerana' 2015. The bi-annual cultural fest was held on May 8 & 9. With ten pre-fest events, and 15 fest events.
- 'Android Hackathon' workshop conducted from 13 to 15 February 2015.
- Department of Computer Science & Engineering, PESITM conducted International Conference on Information and Communication Technologies (ICICT-2014) on 5 and 6 May 2014.
- PESITM conducted Annual Cultural Fest Prerana - 2014 in the month of April, 2014
- Google Android app development workshop was conducted by Dept. of Computer Science in association with Google Development Group (GDG) of Mangalore 14 and 15 March 2014.
- A two-day WorkShop on "Getting started with Unity3D for Windows 8″ was conducted at PESITM College on 16 and 17 March by "Student Nokia Developers Group of PESITM".
- PESITM in association with Microsoft conducted 24-hour App Fest Hackaton on 29 and 30 September 2013.
- Department of CSE conducted three- day Mobile Innovation Workshop in association with Nokia.
