= Tekkami Atchuta Rao =

Indian cricketer (born 1986)

Personal information
- Born: 21 August 1986 (age 40); Visakhapatnam, India
- Batting: Left-handed
- Bowling: Left-arm medium-fast

Domestic team information
- Years: Team
- 2008-2014: Andhra
- 2012: Deccan Chargers

Career statistics
Competition	FC	LA	T20
Matches	16	23	6
Runs scored	334	166	6
Batting average	17.57	12.76	3.00
100s/50s	0/0	0/0	0/0
Top score	49	37*	6
Balls bowled	2,822	982	124
Wickets	51	19	7
Bowling average	25.64	42.57	22.00
5 wickets in innings	3	0	0
10 wickets in match	0	0	0
Best bowling	6/43	3/38	4/32
Catches/stumpings	8/0	6/0	0/0
- Source: Cricinfo, 14 September 2018

Tekkami Atchuta Rao (born 21 August 1986) was an Indian first-class cricketer who played for Andhra from 2008 to 2014. He made his first-class debut for Andhra in Ranji Trophy against Baroda during 2008–09 season in which he took a fifer.

He was picked as an uncapped player by Deccan Chargers for 2012 Indian Premier League.
