= Jawaharlal Nehru National College of Engineering =

Engineering college in Shimoga, Karnataka, India

Jawaharlal Nehru New College of Engineering
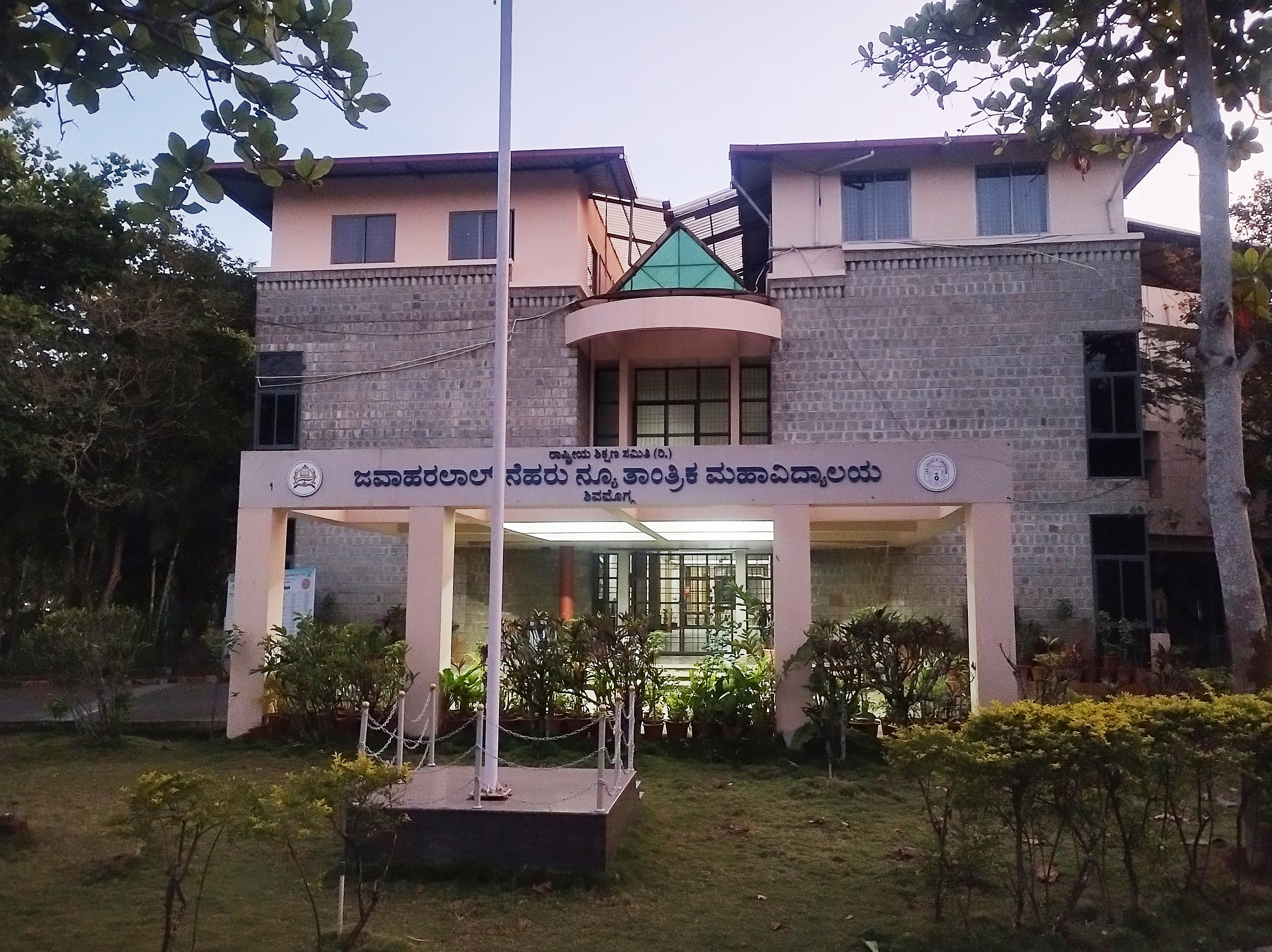
- Administrative section of the college, in 2026
- Motto: sanskrit: Satyameva Jayate
- Motto in English: Truth alone triumphs
- Type: Engineering College
- Established: 1980
- Accreditation: National Board of Accreditation and All India Council for Technical Education
- Affiliations: Visvesvaraya Technological University
- Principal: Dr. K Nagendra Prasad
- Administrative staff: ~400
- Students: ~4000
- Location: Shimoga, Karnataka, India; 13°57′57″N 75°36′46.5″E
- Website: http://www.jnnce.ac.in

Jawaharlal Nehru New College of Engineering or JNNCE is an engineering college established in 1980 by the National Education Society (NES) in Shimoga, Karnataka, India. It is affiliated to the Visvesvaraya Technological University, Belgaum and is accredited by the National Board of Accreditation (NBA), All India Council for Technical Education (AICTE). The college campus is spread over an area of more than 55 acres (220,000 m^{2}). The college offers seven undergraduate engineering degrees (B.E) and four postgraduate degrees. The Research and Development (R & D) centers in engineering and business departments offer Ph.D. and M.Sc. (Engineering) degrees by research.

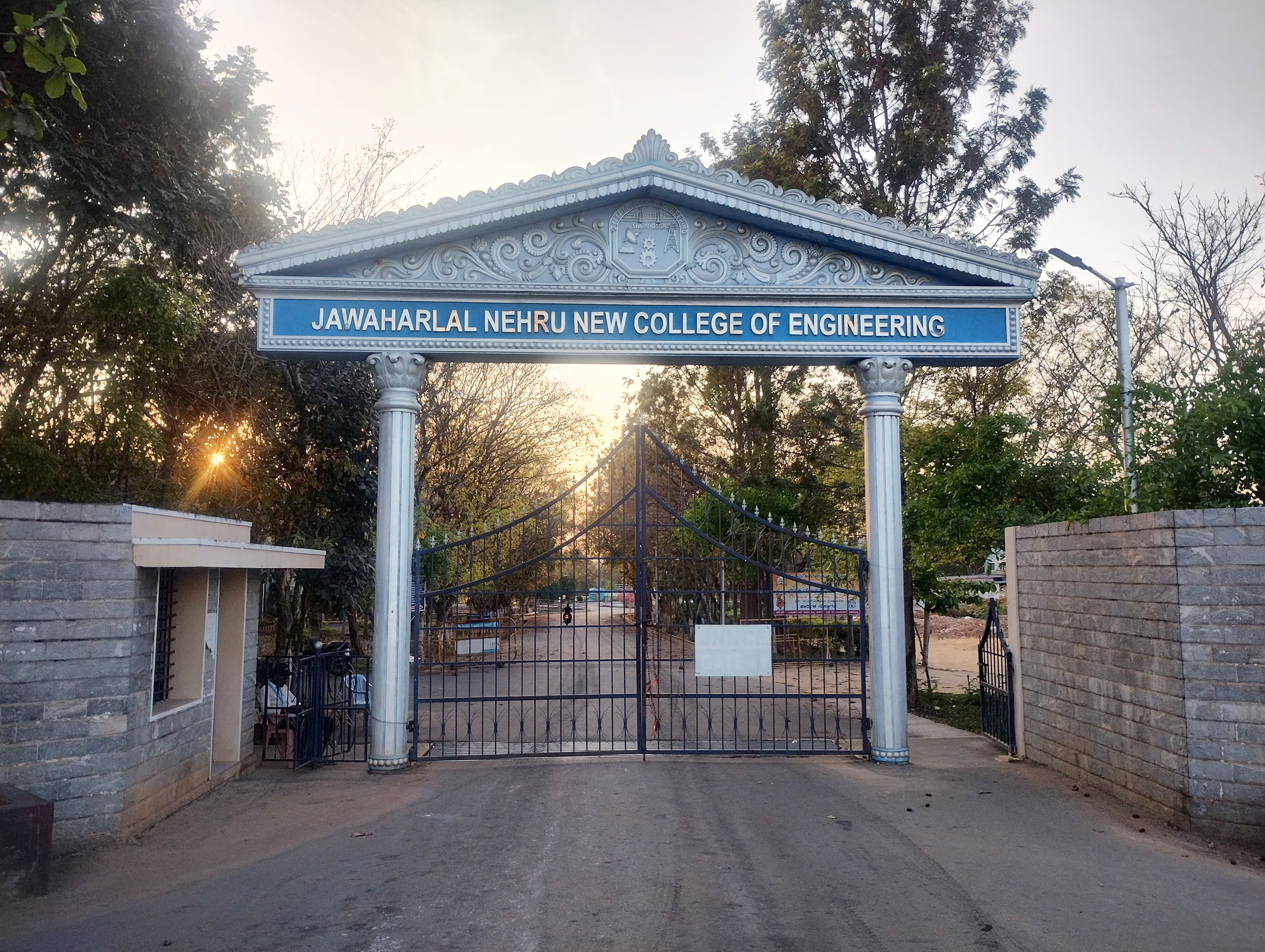
Arch at the entrance of the college, in 2026

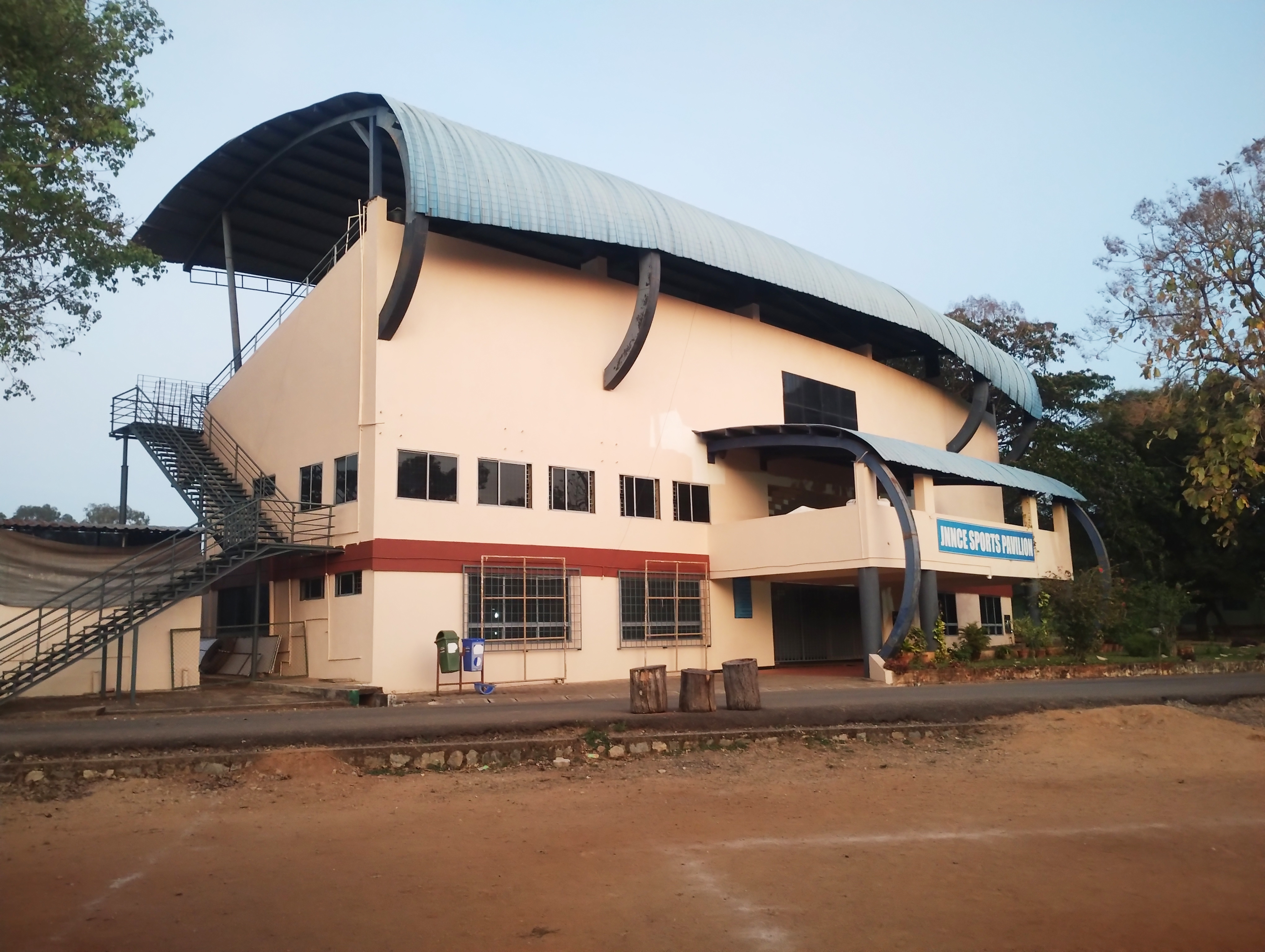
College sports pavilion in 2026

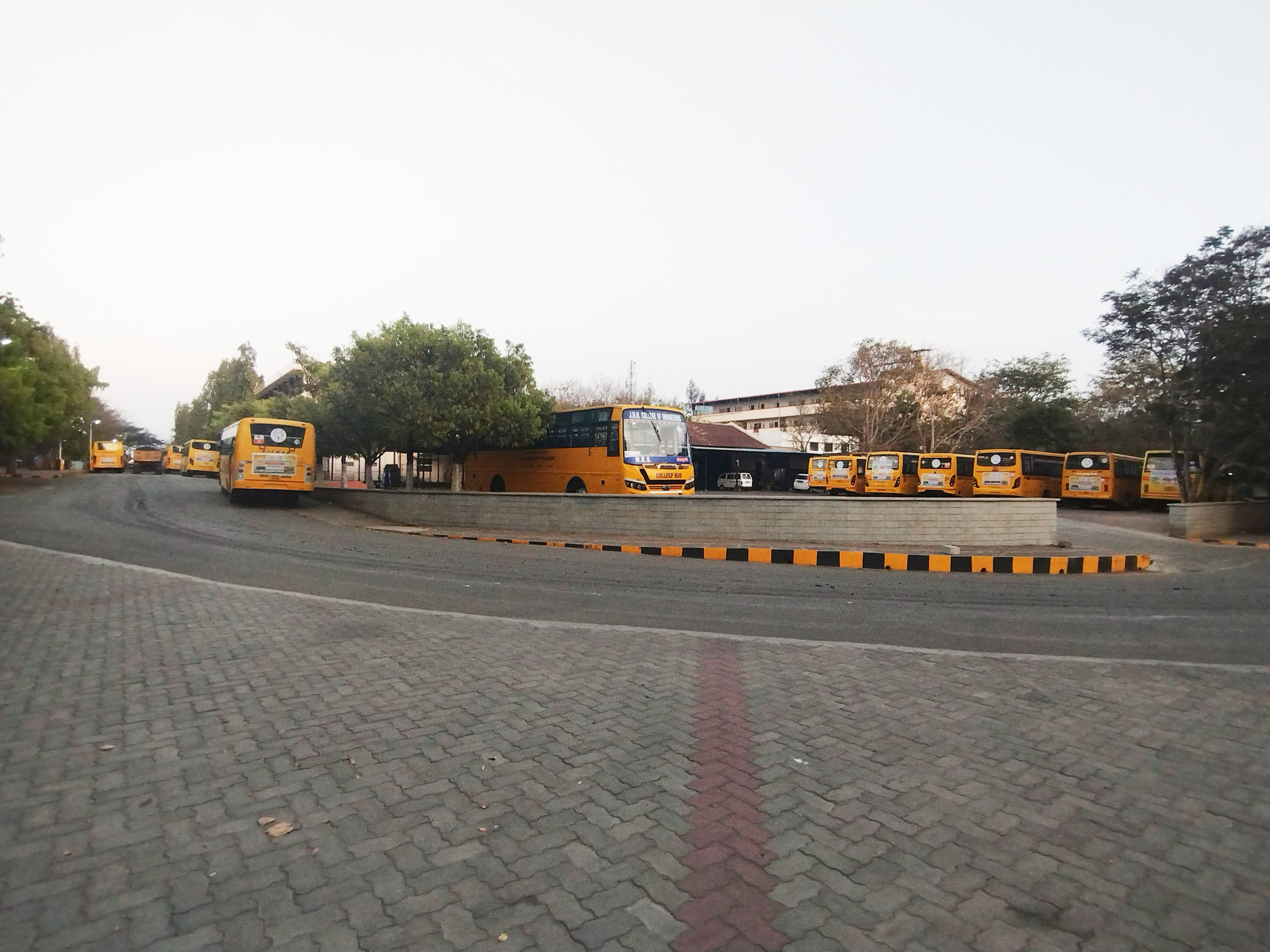
College bus shelter, in 2026

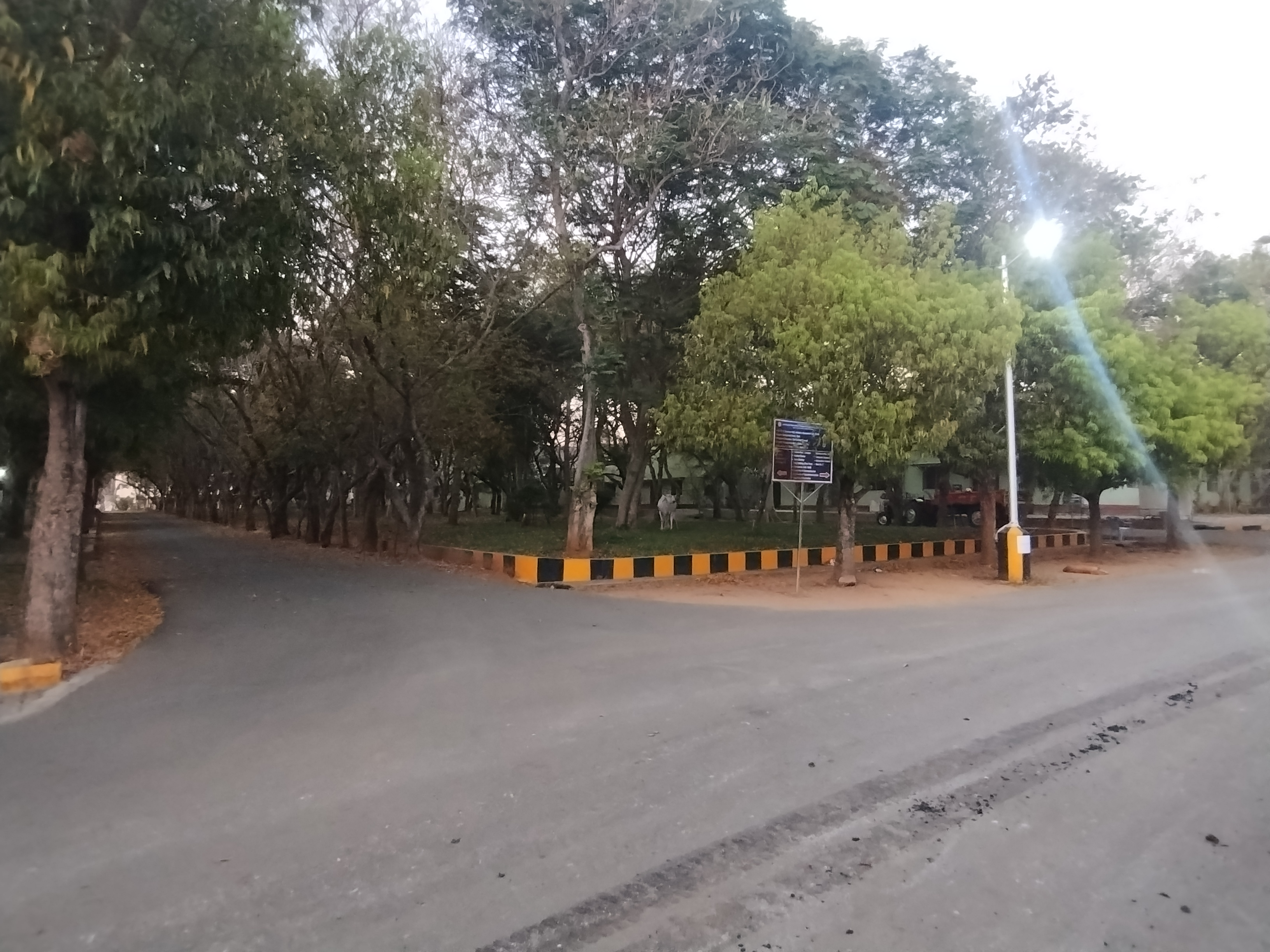
College campus, in 2026

== Facilities ==
The campus is spread over an area of more than 55 acres. The railway station is about 3 km from college and the KSRTC bus stand is nearly 6 km. There is also a Post Office inside the college campus.

=== Hostels ===
The college has separate hostel facilities both for boys and girls. Four hostels for boys, namely, Tunga, Bhadra, Krishna and Sharavathi, are located in the campus. The girls' hostel is a building located near to the college outside the campus. P.G. and Final B.E. students are provided with single rooms.

=== Transportation ===
The city is connected by number of college bus. The college has provided bus facility for students coming from Bhadravathi. College buses run between the college and every other part of city throughout the day. Bus timings to college are 7:10 am, 8:05 am, 10:15 am. Bus timing from college are 12:40 pm, 1:30 pm, 5:25 pm. Busses also operate until 8:30 pm for the convenience of hostel students.

=== Bank facility ===
The Canara bank is situated in the campus and it offers banking service to the staff and students of the college.

== Academic profile ==
=== Admission ===
Students are admitted to undergraduate courses on basis of their merit in the Karnataka CET test, or in the COMED-K undergraduate test. Students are also admitted through a management quota also that does not require merit(donation). There is a lateral entry scheme in place, by which students holding diploma degrees can enter directly to the second year of study in engineering.

=== Departments ===
Basic Science

- Mathematics
- Physics
- Chemistry

Undergraduate

- Artificial Intelligence and Machine Learning
- Electrical and Electronics Engineering
- Telecommunication Engineering
- Mechanical Engineering
- Civil Engineering
- Computer Science Engineering
- Information Science Engineering
- Industrial & Production Engineering
- Electronics and Communication Engineering

Postgraduate

- Master of Business Administration
- Master of Computer Applications
- M. Tech in Computer Science Engineering
- M.Tech. in Networking and Internet Engineering
- M.Tech. in Design Engineering
