= S. L. Akshay =

Indian cricketer (1987–2026)

Personal information
- Born: 30 April 1987; Shimoga, Karnataka, India
- Died: 24 May 2026 (aged 39); Bengaluru, Karnataka, India
- Source: Cricinfo, 23 October 2015

S. L. Akshay (30 April 1987 – 24 May 2026) was an Indian first-class cricketer who played for Karnataka. He made his first-class debut in the 2011–12 Ranji Trophy.

Akshay died of a heart attack on 24 May 2026, at the age of 39.
