= Rajinder Singh Institute Ground =

Multi purpose stadium in Bangalore, India

- Full name: Rajinder Singh Institute Ground
- Location: Bangalore, Karnataka
- Owner: Rajinder Singh Institute
- Operator: Rajinder Singh Institute
- Capacity: 5,000

Construction
- Groundbreaking: 1994
- Opened: 1984

Website
- Cricinfo

Rajinder Singh Institute Ground is a multi purpose stadium in Bangalore, Karnataka. The ground is mainly used for organizing matches of football, cricket and other sports. The stadium has hosted nine Ranji Trophy matches from 1964 when Karnataka cricket team played against Kerala cricket team until 2008.

The stadium has hosted six List A matches in 1996 when Karnataka cricket team played against Kerala cricket team until 2012 but since then the stadium has hosted non-first-class matches.
