= Suraj Dongre =

Indian cricketer (born 1989)

Personal information
- Full name: Suraj Rukmana Dongre
- Born: 27 December 1989 (age 36); Belgaum, Karnataka, India
- Source: ESPNcricinfo, 22 November 2016

Suraj Dongre (born 27 December 1989) is an Indian first-class cricketer who plays for Goa. He made his first-class debut for Goa in the 2014–15 Ranji Trophy on 29 January 2012.
