= Gajendra Singh (cricketer) =

Indian cricketer (born 1988)

Personal information
- Born: 10 September 1988 (age 38); Bikaner, Rajasthan, India
- Batting: Right-handed
- Bowling: Slow left-arm orthodox

Domestic team information
- Years: Team
- 2007-2012: Rajasthan
- Source: ESPNcricinfo

Gajendra Singh (born 10 September 1988) is an Indian first-class cricketer who plays for Rajasthan. He made his first-class debut for Rajasthan in the 2007–08 Ranji Trophy on 17 December 2007.
