= Praneeth Kumar =

Indian cricketer (born 1989)

Personal information
- Born: 13 October 1989 (age 37); Hyderabad, India

Domestic team information
- Years: Team
- 2013-present: Hyderabad

Career statistics
Competition	LA	T20
Matches	6	6
Runs scored	85	35
Batting average	17.00	7.00
100s/50s	0/1	0/0
Top score	68	13
Balls bowled	42	78
Wickets	0	4
Bowling average	–	23.50
5 wickets in innings	–	0
10 wickets in match	–	0
Best bowling	–	2/26
Catches/stumpings	3/0	1/0
- Source: ESPNcricinfo, 25 June 2018

Praneeth Kumar (born 13 October 1989) is an Indian former cricketer. He played six List A matches for Hyderabad between 2013 and 2014.

== See also ==
- List of Hyderabad cricketers
