= Steven Finn =

English cricketer

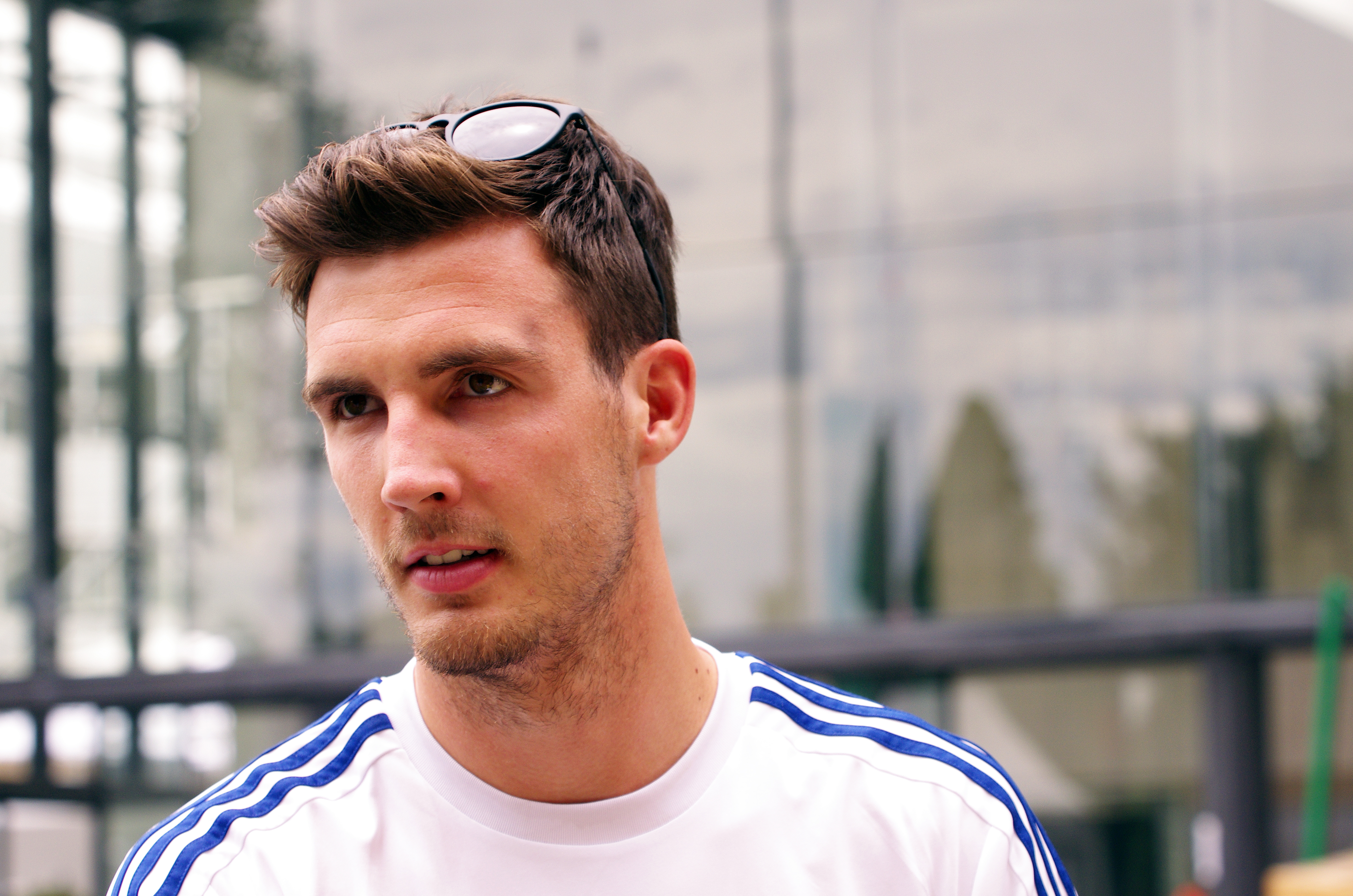
- Steven Finn (2014)

Personal information
- Full name: Steven Thomas Finn
- Born: 4 April 1989 (age 37); Watford, Hertfordshire, England
- Nickname: Finny, The Watford Wall
- Height: 6 ft 8 in (2.03 m)
- Batting: Right-handed
- Bowling: Right-arm fast-medium
- Role: Bowler

International information
- National side: England (2010–2017)
- Test debut (cap 647): 2 March 2010 v Bangladesh
- Last Test: 28 October 2016 v Bangladesh
- ODI debut (cap 218): 30 January 2011 v Australia
- Last ODI: 29 May 2017 v South Africa
- ODI shirt no.: 11
- T20I debut (cap 57): 23 September 2011 v West Indies
- Last T20I: 31 August 2015 v Australia
- T20I shirt no.: 11

Domestic team information
- Years: Team
- 2005–2021: Middlesex (squad no. 9)
- 2011/12: Otago Volts
- 2018: Islamabad United (squad no. 25)
- 2021: Manchester Originals (squad no. 9)
- 2022–2023: Sussex (squad no. 44)

Career statistics
Competition	Test	ODI	FC	LA
Matches	36	69	164	145
Runs scored	279	136	1,317	411
Batting average	11.16	8.00	9.61	12.08
100s/50s	0/1	0/0	0/2	0/0
Top score	56	35	56	42*
Balls bowled	6,412	3,550	28,932	6,845
Wickets	125	102	570	201
Bowling average	30.40	29.37	29.31	29.25
5 wickets in innings	5	2	15	3
10 wickets in match	0	0	1	0
Best bowling	6/79	5/33	9/37	5/33
Catches/stumpings	8/–	15/–	51/–	33/–
- Source: CricInfo, 10 August 2023

Steven Thomas Finn (born 4 April 1989) is a former English cricketer. He was a right-arm fast bowler, who also bats right-handed. At the age of 16, he became Middlesex County Cricket Club's youngest-ever debutant in first-class cricket. He made his England Test debut in 2010 against Bangladesh. In 2019 he became a commentator for Test Match Special.

== Early life ==
Finn was educated at Parmiter's School in Garston near Watford. He is a supporter of Watford F.C. and a former county basketball player.

Finn played locally for Langleybury CC and West Herts CC, and later in his career for Hampstead Cricket Club.

== Domestic cricket ==
He made his first-class debut for Middlesex on 1 June 2005, playing against Cambridge UCCE at Fenner's. He took 1 wicket for 16 runs (1/16) and 1/37 and did not bat. He became Middlesex's youngest first-class debutant, beating the record set by 16-year-old Fred Titmus in 1949. He also played Middlesex age group cricket.

He was not re-engaged by Middlesex following the 2021 season and signed a contract with Sussex for the 2022 season, where he took 21 wickets in 19 appearances.

Finn played for Manchester Originals in the inaugural season of The Hundred, where he set a record for the most runs conceded in the competition - fifty-one from his fifteen deliveries.

Following a knee injury in 2022, which left him sidelined for most of 2023, Finn announced his retirement from all forms of cricket on 14 August 2023.

== England ==
=== Introduction to international cricket ===
Finn toured South Africa with the England Under-16 squad in 2005. He played in two Under-19 Test matches and three Under-19 ODIs against the Indian team that toured England in 2006, and in seven Under-19 ODIs in Malaysia in early 2007.

In February and March 2010, he was part of the England Lions team to tour the United Arab Emirates, earning selection with a solid 2009 season of 53 wickets at 30.64. He impressed the selectors, and was short-listed for the 2009 World Twenty20 though was not picked for the final team.

=== 2010: Bangladesh ===
When the senior squad's bowling attack was restricted by injury at the beginning of the 2010 Bangladesh tour, he was flown in as bowling cover. He played a tour match the day after arriving, and took three wickets in some economical spells of bowling across the two innings, and subsequently leapfrogged Liam Plunkett and Ajmal Shahzad to be picked for the first Test match on 12 March 2010. He was aged just 20, and became the 647th man to play Test cricket for England.

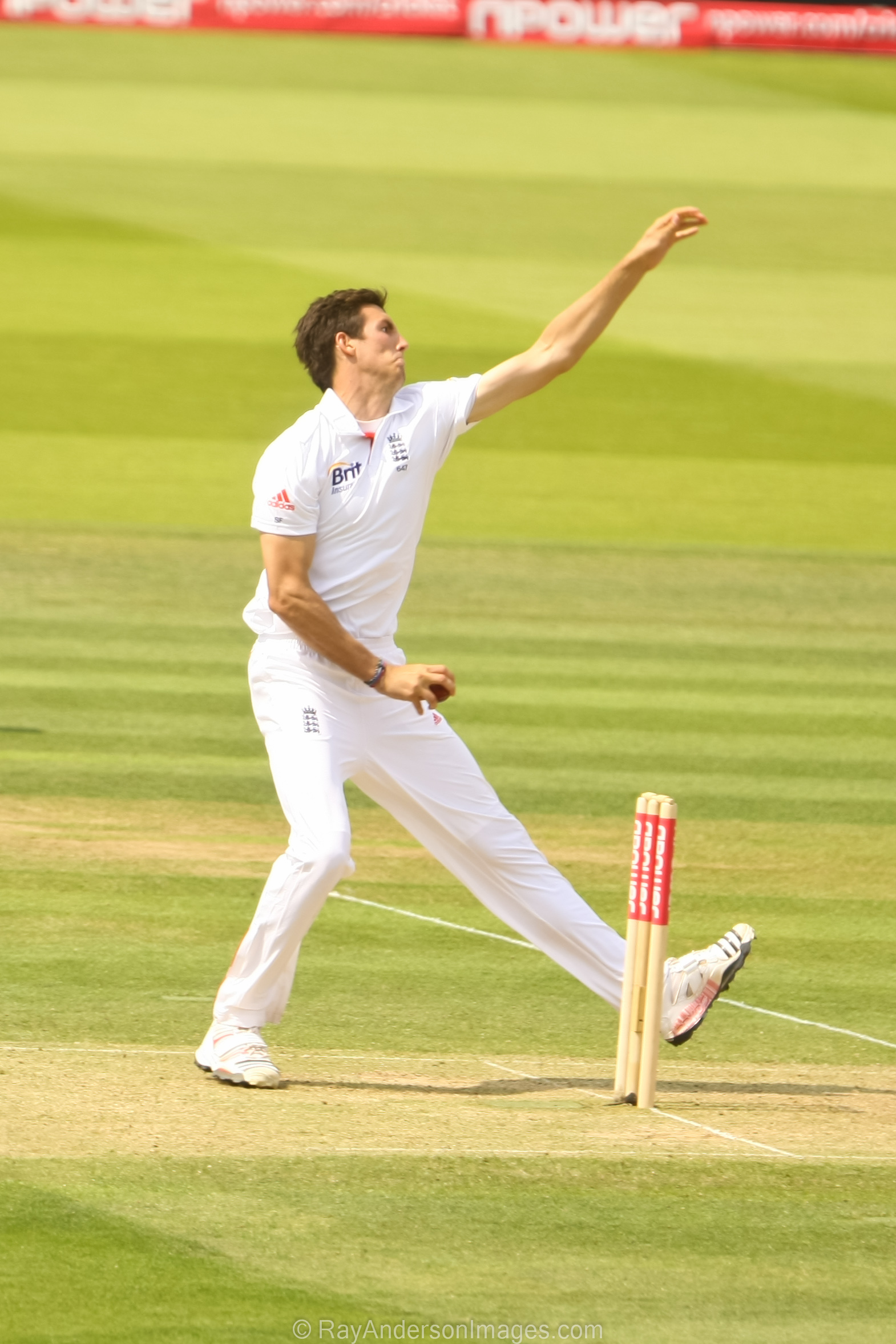
Finn bowling against Sri Lanka in June 2011

He played in both Test matches, which England won by 181 runs and 10 wickets respectively. His first wicket was Bangladeshi batsman Shahadat Hossain, who was caught by Paul Collingwood, and proceeded to take one wicket in each of the four Bangladeshi innings. A double declaration by England in the first Test meant that he wasn't required to bat until the second Test where he finished unbeaten on 0 from 10 balls.

After an impressive start to the County season, including a 14-wicket match haul, he was chosen again to face Bangladesh, this time in England. In the first match at Lord's, his home debut, he took a 5-wicket-haul in the second innings as England won by eight wickets, finishing with nine wickets in the match. In doing so he was compared to Angus Fraser and Glenn McGrath by many media pundits, although he also worried them by frequently falling over in his follow-through. Nevertheless, he went on to Old Trafford to take a second five-for, being named Player of the Series in his debutante international home season.

=== 2010: Pakistan ===
Finn was not selected for the ODI series against Australia and Bangladesh, but returned for the Test series against Pakistan. Finn was quietly effective; though he did not bowl as much as fellow pace-bowlers James Anderson and Stuart Broad, he picked up 13 wickets at an average of 22.92. Finn was also part of a useful 49-run unbeaten last-wicket partnership with Matt Prior in the first Test, which enabled Prior to reach a century despite only having 63 runs when Finn came to the crease. Finn picked up five wickets in the match, including 3–50 in the first innings as England won by 354 runs. He bowled less in the second Test, taking match figures of 3–67. Finn was less impressive in the third Test at the Oval, but took 3–38 in the final Test of the series as England won by 225 runs. England won the series 3–1, though the series ended amid newspaper allegations of spot-fixing involving several members of the Pakistan team.

=== 2010/2011: Australia ===
Finn's performances during the summer saw him selected for England's squad for the 2010-11 Ashes series and he won the ICC Emerging Player of the year award at the 2010 ICC Awards. Chosen for the first Test at the Gabba in Brisbane, Finn took his first Ashes wicket catching Simon Katich off his own bowling. He later took the wickets of several of the Australian tail to finish with Test-best figures of 6–125, his third five wicket haul in only his ninth Test. He took a further 8 wickets in the next two Tests, as England won in Adelaide before Australia squared the series at Perth. Despite being the leading wicket taker in the series for either team after 3 Tests, Finn was rested for the fourth Test, which England won. His replacement, Tim Bresnan, impressed in the fourth Test and kept his place for the fifth Test as England won both games by an innings to record a 3–1 victory – their first in Australia for 24 years. Finn finished with 14 wickets at an average of 33.14. Although he wasn't initially included in the limited overs squads, he was added as cover for the rested James Anderson for the two Twenty20 internationals and the first three ODI matches. On 30 January 2011 he made his ODI debut taking 1/61 off his 10 overs and scoring 35 runs as number 11 with a late flurry at the end of England's innings in a partnership of 53 with James Anderson. He kept his place for next game where he took 2–51. In the final game of the series, he was wicketless as he finished with figures of 0–57.

=== 2011: Sri Lanka and India ===
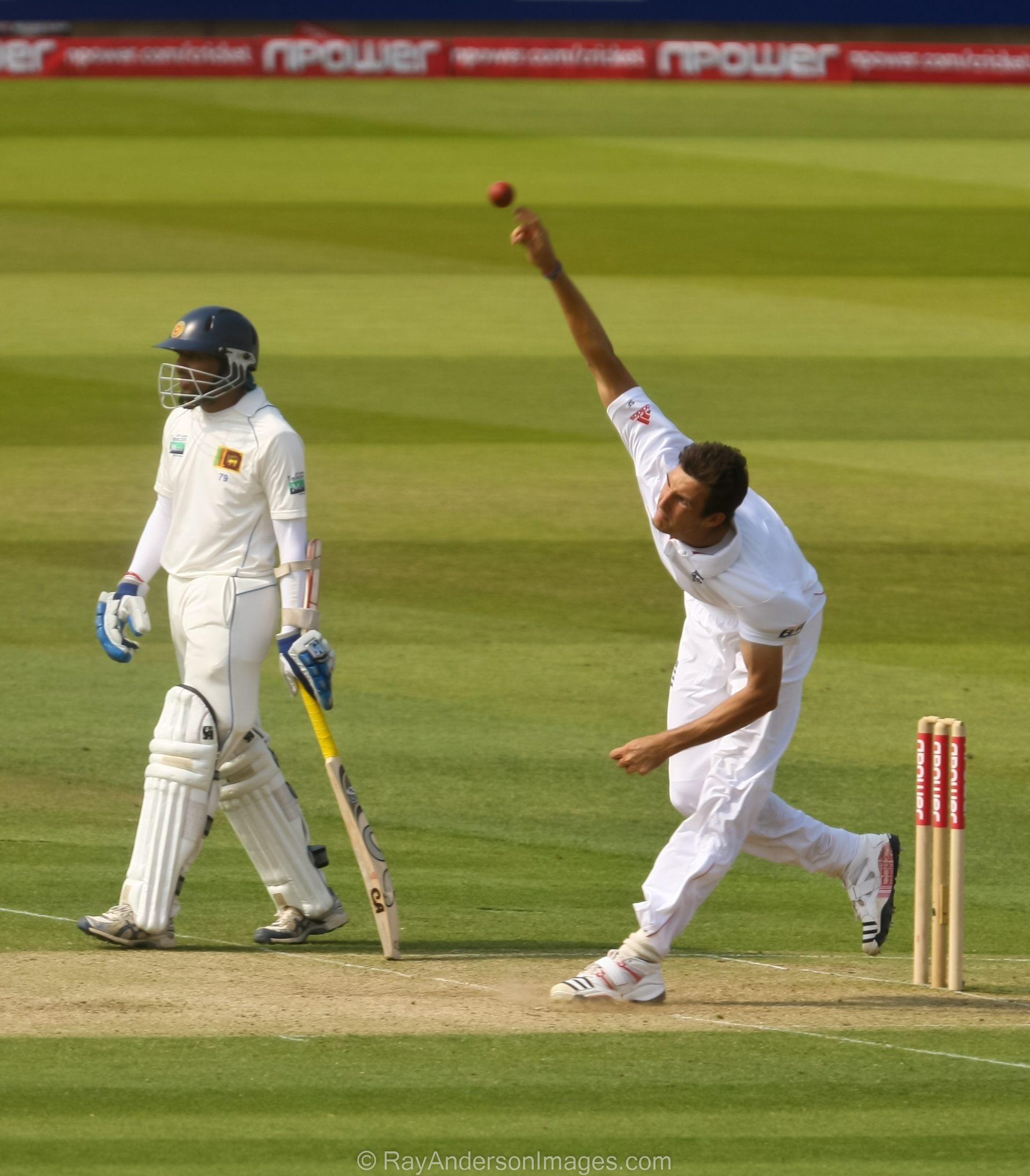
Finn bowling at Lord's in June 2011 against Sri Lanka

Having been dropped from the Test team during the Ashes, Finn faced competition from fast bowlers such as Bresnan and Shahzad to break into the team. When Sri Lanka toured in May Finn was included in the Test squad, though missed out on selection for the first match. An injury to James Anderson opened up a gap in England's bowling attack and Finn was chosen as his replacement. England's fast bowlers struggled to dismiss Sri Lanka, but Finn took 4/108 and in the process became the youngest player to reach 50 Test wickets for England. Anderson returned to fitness in time for the next Test and Finn was dropped to make room for him. Finn was subsequently dropped from the Test squad to face India in July in favour of Tim Bresnan but recalled as cover for the injured Chris Tremlett ahead of the third Test, though he did not play. Towards the end of the season, Finn's bowling was frequently reaching 90 miles per hour (145 km/h). He played three ODIs during England's 2011 home season, taking four wickets. These included two ODIs against India, where he took figures of 1–54 and 1–44.

When England toured India in October for five ODIs, senior fast bowlers James Anderson and Stuart Broad were absent, rested and injured respectively. Finn was included in the squad. In the first ODI he took 1–67 as England suffered a heavy defeat by 126 runs. He had no wicket in the second, finishing 0-50. He performed better in the next two matches, taking 2–44 and 3–45. Finn bowled all of his ten overs in the final match of the series, finishing with 2–47 as England lost by 95 runs. Finn finished as England's leading wicket-taker in the series with 8 dismissals at an average of 31.62. Commenting on Finn's performance in the series, which England lost 5–0, coach Andy Flower said "Coming into the series he wasn't a first-choice limited-overs cricketer for us. But he has been the outstanding bowler in our side." Finn took 3–22 in a T20 match against India following the ODI series. After the tour Finn exploited a gap in England's international schedule to join Otago to gain experience.

=== 2012: Pakistan, Sri Lanka and West Indies ===
Although Finn played no part in the Test series against Pakistan, he played a big part in the limited overs series. He took 4–34 in the first ODI and followed this up with the same figures in the next match as England went 2–0 up in the series. Finn a gained his good form in the next game as he took 3–24, before finishing off with 2–42 to help England win the match by 4 wickets and wrap up the series. He played the first T20 match, taking 1–39 as England suffered an eight run defeat. He took three wickets in the next game to help England level the series, before taking 0–31 in the final game to help England win the series 2–1.

Finn played in the second test against Sri Lanka, a game England needed to win to keep hold of their number one Test ranking. Finn took 1–51 in the first innings before taking 2–30 in the second to help England win the match by 8 wickets and draw the series 1–1.

Finn played in the third Test against the West Indies in June. The match was affected by rain and ended in a draw, with Finn taking figures of 3–109 in the only innings he bowled in. He played in the first ODI where he took 1–29 as England won by 114 runs. He took 1–48 in the second match as England again won, this time by 8 wickets. He took figures of 2–22 in the T20 match between the two teams.

=== 2012: South Africa and ICC T20 World Cup ===
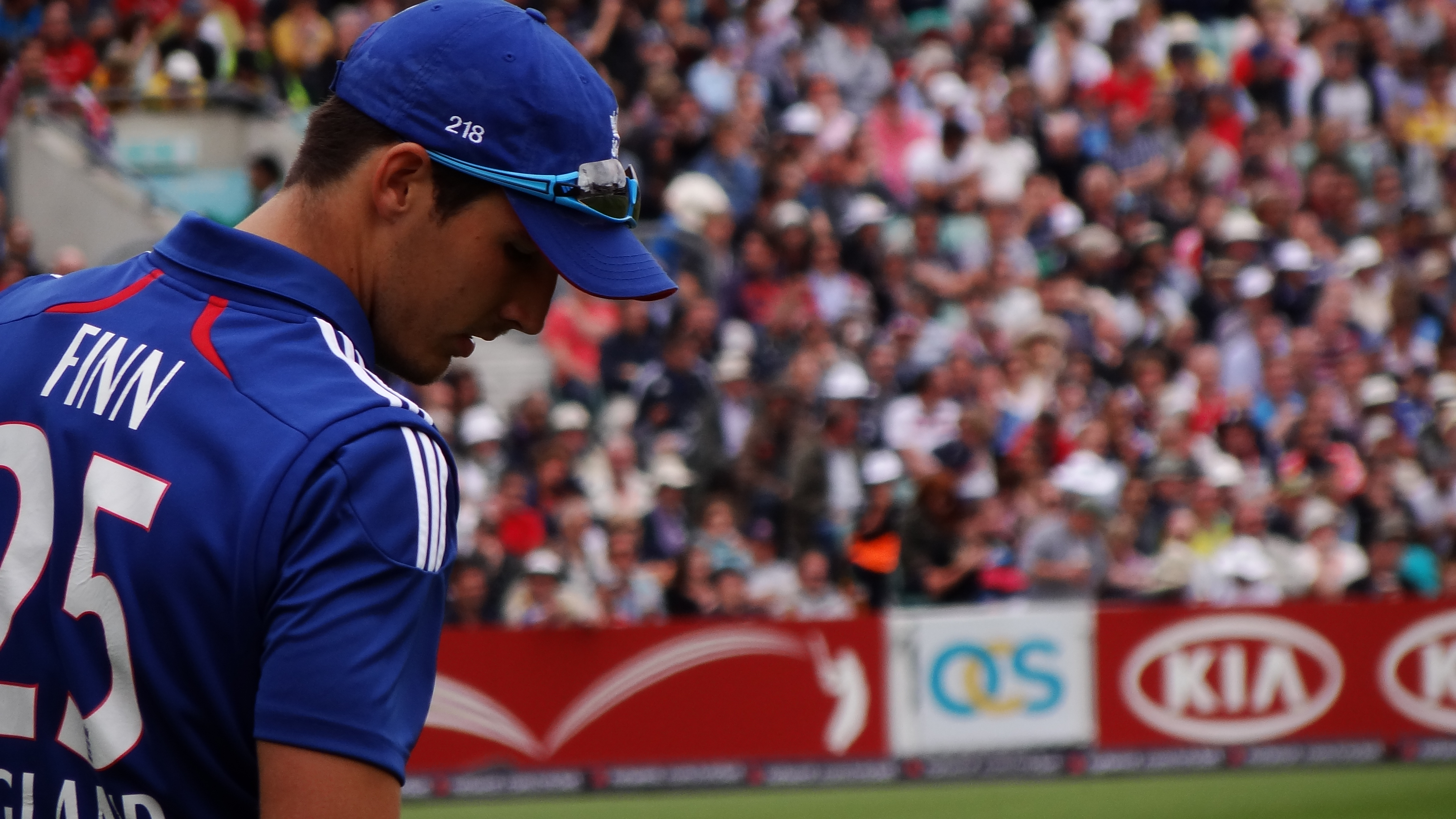
Finn in the field during an ODI against Australia in 2012

Finn was selected in the team for the second Test against South Africa, having missed out on selection for the first match. He finished with figures of 2–118 in South Africa's first innings and then 0–55 in their second. Finn kept his place for next match and bowled well in e first innings, taking 4–75, including the wickets of Hashim Amla and Jacques Kallis. He took figures of 4–74 in the third innings of the match, again dismissing Amla and Kallis and also getting the wicket of AB De Villiers. South Africa went on to win the match to win the series 2–0 and claim the number one Test ranking spot of England. Finn played in the first ODI between the two teams, but the match was abandoned due to rain. He took 1–59 in the second match and 0–42 in the third. He took 1–33 in the final match of the series to help England win by 6 wickets. He took 1–22 in his four overs in the first T20 match, but England only made 118 and lost by 7 wickets. He took 2–17 in the final match from two overs, but no result was reached due to rain.

Finn was selected in the England squad for the T20 World Cup in Sri Lanka. He took 1–23 against Afghanistan as England got off to a winning start. However, they lost their next game against India, although Finn took two wickets. In the 2012 ICC World T20, he along with Jade Dernbach set the record for the highest 10th wicket partnership in T20 World Cups (20). This pair has also equalled Nikita Miller-Sulieman Benn record partnership for the last wicket in T20 World Cups.

He took the wicket of Keiron Pollard in the next group game, but England again lost, this time by 15 runs. In the must win game against New Zealand, he took 3–16 to help England win by six wickets and qualify for the quarter-finals. However, they lost their match against the hosts Sri Lanka by 19 runs, with Finn taking figures of 1–24 in the match, and finishing he tournament with 8 wickets.

For his performances in 2012, he was named in the ODI Team of the Year by the ICC and Cricinfo. He was also named in the T20I XI of the year by Cricinfo.

=== 2012/13: India ===
Finn was selected as part of the Test squad that toured India in 2012. However, he only played one match in the series, which was the third test. Finn took the wicket of India captain MS Dhoni in the first innings and finished with 1–73. He performed better in the second innings, taking 3–45, which included the wicket of Indian batsman Virat Kohli. England won the game by seven wickets, but Finn did not keep his place for the final match of the series. He played in all five internationals, taking 1–63 in the first match as England won by 9 runs to go 1–0 up in the series. However, they lost their next three matches, with Finn taking figures of 2–51, 1–50 and 1–39 in the three games. England won the final match of the series by seven wickets, with Finn taking 2–27 to help England end on a high.

=== 2013: New Zealand and ICC Champions Trophy ===
Finn was selected in the squad for the tour of New Zealand, which began with three T20 Internationals. He took 3–39 in the first match as England won by 40 runs, before ended wicket less in the second match which England lost. He finished with figures of 0–18 in the third and final match as England won by ten wickets to take the series 2–1. He played in the ODI series, taking 1–54 in the first match, followed by 1–33 in the next. He finished the series by taking 3–27 as England won by 5 wickets. Finn played in all three test matches in the series in New Zealand. His bowling was disappointing in the first match, taking 1–102 before making 56 with the bat, his first International half century, as the match ended in a draw dominated by batsmen. He took 2–72 and 0–36 in the next Test, which again ended in a draw. In the final match of the series he took figures of 6–125 and 1–57 as the match again ended in a draw and the series finished 0–0.

In the return series, Finn played in the first test match, taking 4–63 as England won 170 runs. Finn was not required to bowl in the second innings as James Anderson and Stuart Broad ripped through the New Zealand batting line up. He was in the wickets in the next test, taking 3–36 and 1–62 as England won by 247 runs to clinch the series 2–0. He only played in one ODI, taking 2–57 in the third match of the series as England won by 34 runs.

Finn was selected in the England squad for the 2013 ICC Champions Trophy but only played a small part. His only appearance came in the semi-final win against South Africa. He took 1–45 to help England reach the final. They lost the final to India, but Finn was not selected in the team.

=== 2013: Australia ===
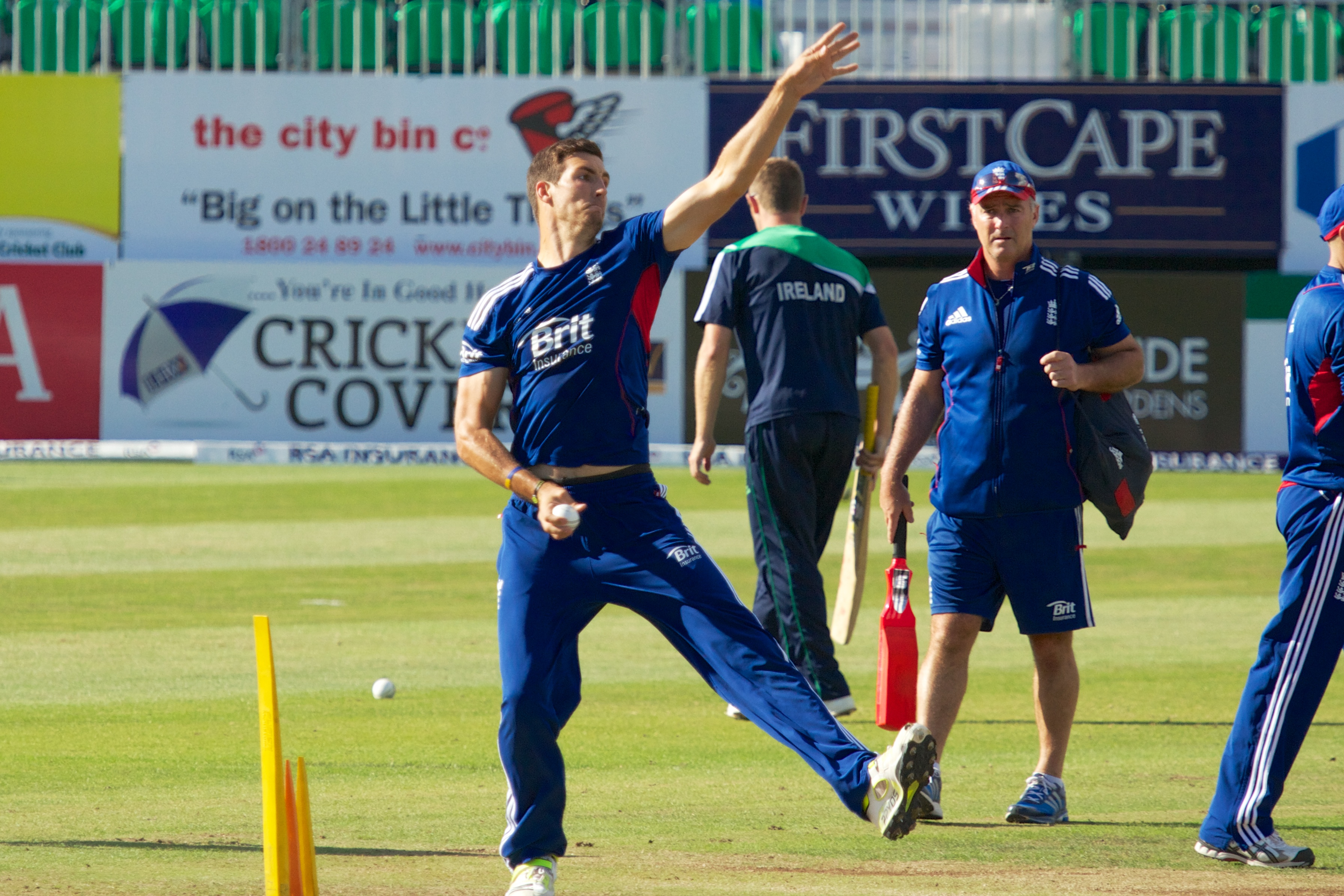
Finn practising ahead of England's ODI against Ireland in 2013

Finn was selected in the team for the first Ashes Test against Australia. He took 2–80 in the first innings, but proved expensive, going at over 5 runs per over. He took 0–37 in the second innings as England won the match to go 1–0 up in the series. However, he did not play again in the series, with Tim Bresnan being preferred to him as the third seamer. Finn was expensive in the first T20, taking 1–45 as England lost by 39 runs. He took 1–30 in the next game which England won to level the series at 1–1. He played in the second ODI, taking 2–68. The third match was abandoned due to rain. In the fourth match, Finn took 2–43 as England narrowly won by 3 wickets.

After being selected for the 2013/14 Ashes tour, Finn was the only member of the touring party not to feature in any of the 5 tests, all of which were won by Australia. He was sent home after the first one-day game, with one-day coach Ashley Giles stating that "[i]n the short term, he needs a couple of weeks away. Steven is not selectable at the moment.".

=== 2014: India ===
Following work on his bowling action and a return to form with Middlesex, Finn was recalled to the England team for the Test series against India. Although Finn could not break into the team, he retained his place for the One Day series. He was recalled to the team for the third ODI at Trent Bridge. He made 6 with the bat before being run out, and then went on to take figures of 1–50 as England lost by six wickets. He retained his place for the next match, but England suffered another heavy defeat, this time by nine wickets. Finn was the most economical of the bowlers, taking figures of 0–38 in seven overs. England won the final match of hone series, with Finn taking 2–37 including the wicket that won the match after he dismissed Ravi Jadeja. Finn was selected in the T20 team and again bowled well, taking figures of 1–28 to help England secure a narrow win.

=== 2014: Sri Lanka ===
After being ruled out of the first ODI through injury, Finn played in the second match, taking figures of 1–35 in six overs. He took 1–41 in the next match, as England won their first game on the tour. He was less impressive in the next match, finishing with figures of 0–61 in 9.4 overs, as Sri Lanka hit the winning runs off his bowling. He took 1–28 in the next game before finishing with 2–53 in the sixth match of the series. With the series already lost, Finn played no part in the final match.

=== 2015: Tri-Series ===
Finn was selected in the England squad for the Tri-Series against India and Australia. In the first match he failed to take a wicket as England lost to Australia. He performed well in the next match, taking figures of 5–33 as England thrashed India. He took figures of 2–65 in the next match against Australia, although England lost the game, meaning they had to beat India to qualify for the final. Finn again performed well, taking figures of 3–36 to help guide England to victory. However, when England met Australia in the final England were unable to produce their best for, with Finn taking figures of 1–53. England lost the match and finished as runners up, with Finn taking eleven wickets in the series.

=== 2015: ICC Cricket World Cup ===
Finn was selected in the 15 man squad for the 2015 Cricket World Cup which was to be held in Australia and New Zealand, making it Finn's first 50 over World Cup. In his world cup debut against Australia, Finn took a hat-trick thus becoming the first England player to take a hat-trick in a World Cup match. He ended the match taking 5 wickets although eventually Australia won the match by 111 runs. In the second match against New Zealand, Finn conceded 49 runs in just his first 2 overs against New Zealand in a loss. He kept his place for the next game against Scotland, finishing with figures of 3–26 as England won their first game of the tournament. He was again expensive against Sri Lanka, finishing with figures of 0–54. Finn played no further part in the tournament as England were eliminated at the Group stage.

=== 2015: New Zealand ===
Finn was selected to play in the limited-overs part of New Zealand tour to England. In the first match he was the pick of England's bowlers, taking 4–35 as England secured an emphatic victory. He was less effective in the next game as England lost, taking figures of 1–69. He was wicketless in the next game, but bowled better in the fourth game of the series, taking 1–51 to help England level the series at 2–2. In the final match of the series he took 2–71, which helped England to win the match and the series 3–2. He also played in the one off T20 match, taking 0–29 as England secured a 56 run victory.

=== 2015: Ashes series ===
Finn was named as back-up in the first two tests in the series, and replaced Mark Wood in the third test at Edgbaston, making his first appearance in the England test team after two years. In his first over, Finn took the wicket of Steve Smith, rated the number one batsman in the world in the ICC Player Rankings. Later in the innings, he bowled Australia captain Michael Clarke, ending with figures of 2/38. During Australia's second innings, Finn again claimed the prized wickets of both Smith and Clarke, as well as his best figures of 6/79 that ripped through the Australian middle order en route to his player of the match honour. In the fourth Test of the series, Finn took 1–21 in Australia's first innings but remained wicketless in their second as England won the match in convincing style to clinch the series 3–1. In the final game of the series, Finn took 3–90 in Australia's first innings but England went on to lose the match by an innings, although they won the series 3–2.

Finn played in the only T20 between the two teams, and took figures of 1–39 as England secured a narrow victory. Finn played in the first three ODIs against Australia. He took 0–41 in the first game which England lost by 59 runs. He then took his first wickets of the series in the second match, finishing with 2–55 although Australia again proved too strong, winning by 64 runs. In the third ODI he took 2–43 as Australia were dismissed for 207 and England secured a 93 run victory. He didn't play in the final two games of the series, and Australia won it 3–2.

=== 2015–16: South Africa ===
After being ruled out of the tour of Pakistan through injury, Finn returned to the Test team for the series against South Africa. In the First Test he recorded figures of 2–49 in South Africa's first innings, and followed this up with 4–42 in their second innings as the hosts were dismissed for 174 and England secured a 241 run victory. In a high scoring second test, Finn could only manage figures of 2–132 as South Africa scored 627–7 declared, and the match finished in a draw. The third Test saw Finn take 2–30 in South Africa's first innings, and 1–14 in the second innings as South Africa were dismissed for 83 and England went on to secure a 7 wicket victory and took an unassailable 2–0 lead in the series. Finn was ruled out of the final Test through injury, which England lost.

=== 2016: Sri Lanka and Pakistan ===
For the first test at Headingley, Finn kept his place in the team. He took two catches in the first innings, and then he took three wickets in the second innings, finishing with figures of 3–26. When he batted in the first innings he scored 17 runs in a 50 run partnership with Jonny Bairstow. In the second Test he could only manage one wicket, but England still won the game in convincing fashion to go 2–0 up in the series. In the third Test he took figures of 3–59 in Sri Lanka's first innings in the third Test, to help reduce them to 288, although the match ended in a draw due to rain delays.

Finn played in the first Test against Pakistan, but did not take a wicket in the match as England lost by 75 runs. After being dropped for the second Test he returned for the third match and took his first two wickets of the series, finishing with figures of 2–38 in England's second innings as they recorded a 141 run victory. In the final match he took 3–110 in Pakistan's first innings as they scored 542. Finn picked up an injury in Pakistan's second innings after bowling just two balls, and England went on to lose the match by ten wickets.

=== 2016: Bangladesh ===
Finn took 0–30 in the first innings of the second Test against Bangladesh as the hosts scored 220. In the second innings he finished with figures of 0–18, and England went onto lose the game by 108 runs to draw the series 1–1.

=== 2017: West Indies ===
In the first ODI against the West Indies Finn took 0–49 as England won by 45 runs. In the second match he took 2–38 as England won by 4 wickets. In the final match of the series he took 2–35 as England bowled the West Indies out for 142 to win by 186 runs.

On 4 June 2017, Finn was called for the England squad for 2017 ICC Champions Trophy as the replacement for injured Chris Woakes.

== Bowling style ==
Writing in 2012 during England's tour of the UAE where they faced Pakistan, ESPNcricinfo journalist, George Dobell wrote of Finn

He has pace and height. He has an easy, repeatable action. He has stamina and strength and, now, he seems to have developed the skills to trouble good batsmen on good surfaces. It is not that he has just learned how to swing and reverse swing the ball, or that he now seems to gain more seam movement, it is that he has put the whole package together and added the vital ingredient – consistency – to his game. ... He has maintained a horrid, nagging length that has left batsmen unsure whether to play forward or back, he has nipped the ball both ways off the seam and gained some swing. And he has done it all at pace. He has regularly exceeded 90mph [145km/h] and left a batsman as experienced as Younis Khan saying how surprised – and impressed – he was with Finn's aggression and hostility.

Prior to 2013, Finn had a frequent habit of knocking the non-striker's stumps with his knee during his delivery, sometimes dislodging a bail. This ultimately caused controversy during the 2012 South Africa tour of England: after the South African batsmen complained of being distracted, the umpire decided to use a provision within the Laws to call a dead ball whenever Finn broke the stumps – with the first such call negating a wicket-taking delivery. In 2013, Finn changed his run-up to correct the problem; and, the ICC introduced a new law to declare a delivery a no-ball, rather than a dead ball, if the non-striker's wicket is broken in the act of delivery – a regulation now commonly known as "Finn's Law".

While being classified as a fast-medium bowler by Cricinfo because he averaged in the mid-to high 130/km/h (80.8 m.p.h.) his fastest delivery was clocked at 151.9 km/h (94.4 m.p.h.) with stamina and height which allowed him to consistently bowl at over 145 km/h (90.1 m.p.h.).

Preceded by Peter Siddle	Emerging Player of the Year; 2010	Succeeded by Devendra Bishoo
