= Palani Amarnath =

Indian cricketer (born 1982)

Personal information
- Born: 1 June 1982 (age 44)
- Batting: Right-handed
- Bowling: Right-arm medium
- Role: Bowler

Domestic team information
- Years: Team
- 2007–2013: Tamil Nadu
- 2008: Chennai Super Kings
- 2016–2017: Siechem Madurai Panthers

Career statistics
Competition	FC	LA	T20
Matches	15	7	14
Runs scored	21	3	1
Batting average	4.20	–	1.00
100s/50s	0/0	0/0	0/0
Top score	8	2*	1
Balls bowled	2,261	370	318
Wickets	29	12	19
Bowling average	38.37	23.58	25.68
5 wickets in innings	2	0	0
10 wickets in match	0	0	0
Best bowling	5/60	4/16	2/25
Catches/stumpings	6/–	1/–	4/–
- Source: ESPNcricinfo, 20 April 2025

Palani Amarnath (born 1 June 1982) is an Indian cricketer who played for the Chennai Super Kings in the Indian Premier League and for Tamil Nadu in the Ranji Trophy. He was born in Vellore.

== Career ==
Amarnath is a fast bowler. He made his debut in first-class cricket against Sri Lanka invitational XI and List A and Twenty20 debuts against Goa.
