= Anwar Ahmed =

Indian cricketer (born 1986)

Personal information
- Born: 10 October 1986 (age 40); Hyderabad, India

Domestic team information
- Years: Team
- 2011-present: Hyderabad

Career statistics
Competition	FC	List A	T20
Matches	19	8	5
Runs scored	17	4	-
Batting average	1.41	1.33	-
100s/50s	0/0	0/0	-
Top score	5*	4	-
Balls bowled	3,266	390	114
Wickets	50	11	4
Bowling average	28.18	30.54	32.00
5 wickets in innings	3	0	0
10 wickets in match	0	0	0
Best bowling	5/44	2/19	2/12
Catches/stumpings	4/0	2/0	1/0
- Source: ESPNcricinfo, 25 June 2018

Anwar Ahmed (born 10 October 1986) is an Indian first-class cricketer who plays for Hyderabad.
