= Shankar Rao (cricketer) =

Indian cricketer (born 1982)

Personal information
- Born: 6 December 1982 (age 43); Dhanbad, India
- Source: Cricinfo, 17 October 2015

Shankar Rao (born 6 December 1982) is an Indian first-class cricketer who plays for Jharkhand.
