= Lalith Mohan =

Indian cricketer (born 1990)

Personal information
- Full name: Akkaraju Lalith Mohan
- Born: 19 March 1990 (age 36); Hyderabad, India

Domestic team information
- Years: Team
- 2007–2015: Hyderabad
- 2020–present: Andhra

Career statistics
Competition	FC
Matches	25
Runs scored	146
Batting average	8.58
100s/50s	0/0
Top score	17*
Balls bowled	5,368
Wickets	53
Bowling average	46.98
5 wickets in innings	3
10 wickets in match	0
Best bowling	6/109
Catches/stumpings	2/0
- Source: ESPNcricinfo, 3 July 2018

Lalith Mohan (born 19 March 1990) is an Indian cricketer who plays for Andhra. He made his Twenty20 debut on 11 January 2021, for Andhra in the 2020–21 Syed Mushtaq Ali Trophy. He made his List A debut on 8 March 2021, for Andhra in the 2020–21 Vijay Hazare Trophy.

== See also ==
- List of Hyderabad cricketers
