= Syed Quadri =

Indian cricketer (born 1981)

Personal information
- Full name: Syed Ahmed Quadri
- Born: 2 December 1981 (age 44); Hyderabad, Andhra Pradesh, India
- Batting: Right-handed
- Bowling: Right-arm offbreak
- Role: All-rounder

Domestic team information
- Years: Team
- 2008: Hyderabad
- FC debut: 10 November 2008 Hyderabad v Delhi
- Last FC: 5 January 2012 Hyderabad v Rajasthan
- Last LA: 7 March 2012 Hyderabad v Punjab

Career statistics
Competition	FC	LA	T20
Matches	46	24	6
Runs scored	2,338	293	65
Batting average	43.29	16.27	21.66
100s/50s	6/14	0/1	0/1
Top score	115*	52*	50
Balls bowled	4,167	500	72
Wickets	34	8	6
Bowling average	62.64	65.00	16.16
5 wickets in innings	1	0	0
10 wickets in match	0	0	0
Best bowling	5/28	4/40	3/25
Catches/stumpings	15/0	4/0	3/0
- Source: ESPN Cricinfo, 23 June 2018

Syed Ahmed Quadri is an Indian former first-class cricketer who played for Hyderabad cricket team in domestic cricket. He was also a member of defunct IPL team Deccan Chargers. He was appointed by the BCCI as a Match Referee in 2025.
