= Akshath Reddy =

Indian cricketer

Personal information
- Born: 11 February 1991 (age 35); Hyderabad, India
- Batting: Right-handed
- Bowling: Right-arm leg break
- Role: Batsman

Domestic team information
- Years: Team
- 2011–present: Hyderabad
- 2012: Deccan Chargers
- 2013: Sunrisers Hyderabad

Career statistics
Competition	FC	LA	T20
Matches	78	59	69
Runs scored	5,233	1,959	1,468
Batting average	44.34	33.77	24.06
100s/50s	15/22	4/11	1/5
Top score	250	154	105*
Balls bowled	36	124	12
Wickets	0	0	0
Bowling average	–	–	–
5 wickets in innings	–	–	–
10 wickets in match	–	–	–
Best bowling	–	–	–
Catches/stumpings	44/–	13/–	16/–
- Source: ESPNcricinfo, 6 May 2020

Produturi Akshath Reddy (born 11 February 1991, Hyderabad) is an Indian cricket player who plays for Hyderabad in the domestic cricket. He is a right-handed batsman.

Reddy made his debut against Rajasthan and was signed up by Deccan Chargers for 2012 Indian Premier League. He was part of the IPL 2013 season with the new owners of the Hyderabad franchise, the Sunrisers Hyderabad.

Reddy scored 359 runs at 51 from five matches in the Cooch Behar Trophy, and 316 runs from the same number of games in the Under-22 CK Nayudu Trophy in the 2008–09 season. He was named in the U-19 squad for the 2010 World Cup in New Zealand. Reddy was encouraged by his father, a former volleyball player, to take up sport seriously. Reddy's idol is India's great Rahul Dravid and compares his style of play to Australia's Michael Hussey.

In November 2018, in Hyderabad's match against Tamil Nadu in the 2018–19 Ranji Trophy, he scored his maiden double-century in first-class cricket. He was the leading run-scorer for Hyderabad in the tournament, with 797 runs in eight matches.

In August 2019, he was named in the India Green team's squad for the 2019–20 Duleep Trophy.
