= English cricket team in India in 2001–02 =

English cricket team in India in 2001-02
	India	England
- Dates: 18 November 2001 – 3 February 2002
Captains	Sourav Ganguly (Note: Anil Kumble captained India for the third ODI.)	Nasser Hussain

Test series
- Result: India won the 3-match series 1–0
Most runs	Marcus Trescothick (318)	Sachin Tendulkar (266)
Most wickets	Harbhajan Singh (10); Ajit Agarkar (10)	Darren Gough (8)
- Player of the series: Sachin Tendulkar (Ind)

One Day International series
- Results: 6-match series drawn 3–3
Most runs	Sachin Tendulkar (307)	Marcus Trescothick (240)
Most wickets	Anil Kumble (19)	Matthew Hoggard (9)
- Player of the series: Sachin Tendulkar (Ind)

The England national cricket team toured India in 2001–02, playing a three-match Test series and six-match ODI series versus India.

== Background ==
The tour schedule was announced on 12 September 2001. England were to play three three-day tour games ahead of the Test series and three one-day games before the ODI series. The five-match ODI series was converted into a six-match affair after a demand by the Board of Control for Cricket in India (BCCI) to play the final ODI at the Eden Gardens in Kolkata. After an initial disagreement, the England and Wales Cricket Board agreed to the demand after the BCCI was reported as saying that India would not honour their commitment to play four Tests in England next summer.

== Squads ==
Tests		ODIs	
India	England	India	England
Sourav Ganguly (c); Rahul Dravid (vc); Shiv Sunder Das; Sachin Tendulkar; VVS Laxman; Virender Sehwag; Deep Dasgupta (wk); Sanjay Bangar; Anil Kumble; Harbhajan Singh; Javagal Srinath; Sanjay Bangar; Iqbal Siddiqui; Tinu Yohannan; Connor Williams; Sarandeep Singh	Nasser Hussain (c); Usman Afzaal; Martyn Ball; Mark Butcher; ~~Andy Caddick~~; ~~Robert Croft~~; Richard Dawson; James Foster (wk); Ashley Giles; Warren Hegg (wk); Matthew Hoggard; Richard Johnson; James Ormond; Mark Ramprakash; Graham Thorpe; Marcus Trescothick; Michael Vaughan; Craig White	Sourav Ganguly (c); Anil Kumble (vc); Sachin Tendulkar; VVS Laxman; Mohammad Kaif; Virender Sehwag; Hemang Badani; Dinesh Mongia; Ajay Ratra (wk); Harbhajan Singh; Sarandeep Singh; Ajit Agarkar; Zaheer Khan; Javagal Srinath; Sanjay Bangar	Nasser Hussain (c); Andy Caddick; Paul Collingwood; Andrew Flintoff; James Foster (wk); Ashley Giles; Darren Gough; Matthew Hoggard; Ben Hollioake; Nick Knight; Owais Shah; Jeremy Snape; Graham Thorpe; Marcus Trescothick; Michael Vaughan

A 16-man England squad for the India and New Zealand Test series was announced in late August 2001. Two uncapped players, Essex wicket-keeper James Foster and Yorkshire off-spinner Richard Dawson were included for the first time, while Lancashire wicket-keeper Warren Hegg was recalled to the squad. On 17 October, England's 16-man squad for the ODI series was announced. It included the same side that toured Zimbabwe earlier that month, with additions of Andy Caddick, Darren Gough, Ashley Giles, Michael Vaughan and Craig White. Paul Grayson, James Kirtley, Mark Ramprakash, Ryan Sidebottom and Chris Silverwood were omitted. Amidst questions regarding security of the players, Caddick and Robert Croft decided not to tour India and declared themselves unavailable on 30 October. They were replaced by Somerset pace-bowler Richard Johnson and Gloucestershire off-spinner Martyn Ball. Giles, White and James Ormond who were nursing injuries were declared fit on 7 November. Graham Thorpe left for England just before the Second Test due to "personal" reasons and was replaced by Michael Vaughan. On 3 January 2002, The England squad was announced again for the ODI series. The core of the team that played the Test series was retained. Additionally, Caddick and Thorpe, who made themselves available, were added to the squad, while White who sustained an injury was excluded.

The Indian selectors named a 14-man squad for the First Test on 27 November. From the squad that toured South Africa earlier that season, four pace-bowlers were dropped and Javagal Srinath was recovering from an injury. Maharashtra and Kerala pace-bowlers Iqbal Siddiqui and Tinu Yohannan respectively were included in the squad alongside Railways all-rounder Sanjay Bangar. Virender Sehwag, who was included for the First test despite a one-match ban on him, was dropped from the squad. He returned for the Second Test with Srinath, the latter replacing an injured Bangar. An India 14-man ODI squad announced on 14 January for the first three ODIs. Rahul Dravid pulled out of the series due to shoulder injury. Wicket-keeper Ajay Ratra and Tamil Nadu batsman Hemang Badani were new inclusions to the squad.

== Test series ==
=== 1st Test ===
3–6 December 2001
Scorecard

England	v	India
238 (76.3 overs); Nasser Hussain 85 (147); Harbhajan Singh 5/51 (19.3 overs)		469 (169 overs); Deep Dasgupta 100 (254); Richard Dawson 4/134 (43 overs)
235 (77.4 overs); Graham Thorpe 62 (120); Anil Kumble 6/81 (28.4 overs)		5/0 (0.2 overs); Iqbal Siddiqui 5* (2); Matthew Hoggard 0/5 (0.2 overs)

India won by 10 wickets
Punjab Cricket Association Stadium, Mohali
Umpires: Steve Bucknor (Win) and S Venkataraghavan (Ind)
Player of the match: Anil Kumble (Ind)

- India won the toss and decided to field.
- Iqbal Siddiqui, Sanjay Bangar and Tinu Yohannan (all Ind), and James Foster and Richard Dawson (both) made their debut in Tests.
- Deep Dasgupta (Ind) scored his first century in Tests.

=== 2nd Test ===
11–15 December 2001
Scorecard

England	v	India
407 (144.3 overs); Craig White 121 (265); Anil Kumble 7/115 (51 overs)		291 (120.3 overs); Sachin Tendulkar 103 (197); Ashley Giles 5/67 (43.3 overs)
257 (83.2 overs); Mark Butcher 92 (202); Harbhajan Singh 5/71 (30.2 overs)		198/3 (97 overs); Deep Dasgupta 60 (190); Richard Dawson 2/72 (32 overs)

Match drawn
Sardar Patel Stadium, Ahmedabad
Umpires: Arani Jayaprakash (Ind) and Ian Robinson (Zim)
Player of the match: Craig White (Eng)

- England won the toss and decided to bat.
- Craig White (Eng) made his debut century in Tests.
- Shiv Sunder Das (Ind) passed 1,000 runs in Tests.

=== 3rd Test ===
19–23 December 2001
Scorecard

England	v	India
336 (123.3 overs); Michael Vaughan 64 (138); Javagal Srinath 4/73 (29 overs)		238 (94.3 overs); Sachin Tendulkar 90 (198); Andrew Flintoff 4/50 (28 overs)
33/0 (7.1 overs); Mark Butcher 23* (25); Harbhajan Singh 0/1 (0.1 overs)

Match drawn
M Chinnaswamy Stadium, Bangalore
Umpires: Asoka de Silva (SL) and Arani Jayaprakash (Ind)
Player of the match: Andrew Flintoff (Eng)

- England won the toss and decided to bat.
- Play was not possible starting the final session of day 3.
- Javagal Srinath (Ind) claimed his 100th wicket in Tests played at home.
- Anil Kumble (Ind) claimed his 300th wicket in Tests.

== ODI series ==
=== 1st ODI ===
19 January (D/N)
Scorecard

India; 281/8 (50 overs)	v	England; 259 (44 overs)
Dinesh Mongia 71 (75); Andrew Flintoff 2/51 (10 overs)		Marcus Trescothick 121 (109); Ajit Agarkar 3/50 (9 overs)

India won by 22 runs
Eden Gardens, Kolkata
Umpires: Krishna Hariharan (Ind) and S. K. Sharma (Ind)
Player of the match: Marcus Trescothick (Eng)

- India won the toss and elected to bat first.
- Ajay Ratra (Ind) made his debut in ODIs.
- Marcus Trescothick set the record for fastest ODI century by an England player, in terms of balls faced (80), before Kevin Pieterson broke the record in 2005 (69 balls).

India got off to a good start after electing to bat upon winning the toss. Openers Sourav Ganguly and Sachin Tendulkar took their team score to 50 in the tenth over before Andrew Flintoff dismissed them both in his first spell. Dinesh Mongia top-scored for India with 71 after reaching 50 in as many balls. His partners VVS Laxman and Virender Sehwag added 55 and 43 runs with him before being dismissed, who were followed by Ajit Agarkar and Ajay Ratra in quick succession. A partnership of 38 between Hemang Badani and Harbhajan Singh towards the end took India's total to 281.

England's reply began with Nick Knight being declared lbw in the second ball of their innings. A second wicket partnership of 63 runs between opener Marcus Trescothick and captain Nasser Hussain steadied their chase. Hussain and later Michael Vaughan partnered Trescothick to add 80 runs between overs 10 and 20, before Paul Collingwood made 21 in a stand of 61 with the former. Trescothick reached his century in 80 balls, before being dismissed in controversial manner. He was adjudged out lbw, although replays showed the ball pitching well outside leg stump before hitting the pads. England's last six wickets fell for 35 runs, and were all out for 259, handing India a 22-run win.

=== 2nd ODI ===
22 January
Scorecard

England; 250/7 (50 overs)	v	India; 234 (48.4 overs)
Paul Collingwood 71 (78); Sourav Ganguly 1/29 (5 overs)		Dinesh Mongia 49 (82); Darren Gough 3/46 (9.4 overs)

England won by 16 runs
Barabati Stadium, Cuttack
Umpires: V. K. Ramaswamy (IND)
Player of the match: Paul Collingwood (Eng)

- India won the toss and elected to field

=== 3rd ODI ===
25 January (D/N)
Scorecard

England; 217 (50 overs)	v	India; 221/6 (46.4 overs)
Michael Vaughan 43 (59); Ajit Agarkar 4/34 (9 overs)		Sachin Tendulkar 68 (79); Matthew Hoggard 3/52 (10 overs)

India won by 4 wickets
M. A. Chidambaram Stadium, Chennai
Umpires: Devendra Sharma (Ind) and Vijay Chopra (Ind)
Player of the match: Sachin Tendulkar (Ind)

- England won the toss and elected to bat
- Sanjay Bangar made his ODI debut

=== 4th ODI ===
28 January
Scorecard

England; 218/7 (50overs)	v	India; 219/2 (29.4 overs)
Nick Knight 74 (82); Sourav Ganguly 2/17 (5.1 overs)		Sachin Tendulkar 87* (67); Paul Collingwood 1/31 (6 overs)

India won by 8 wickets
Green Park Stadium, Kanpur
Umpires: Ivaturi Shivram (Ind)
Player of the match: Virendra Sehwag (Ind)

- England won the toss and elected to bat
- Mohammed Kaif made his ODI debut

=== 5th ODI ===
31 January
Scorecard

England; 271/5 (50 overs)	v	India; 269/8 (50 overs)
Nick Knight 105 (131); Ajit Agarkar 2/61 (10 overs)		Saurav Ganguly 74 (95); Ashley Giles 5/57 (10 overs)

England won by 2 runs
Feroz Shah Kotla Ground, New Delhi
Umpires: Subroto Porel (Ind) and Aloke Bhattacharjee (NZ)
Player of the match: Ashley Giles (Eng)

- India won the toss and elected to field
- Sarandeep Singh made his ODI debut

=== 6th ODI ===
3 February (D/N)
Scorecard

England; 255 (50 overs)	v	India; 250 (49.5 overs)
Marcus Trescothick 95 (80); Harbhajan Singh 5/43 (10 overs)		Saurav Ganguly 80 (99); Andrew Flintoff 3/38 (9.5 overs)

England won by 5 runs
Wankhede Stadium, Mumbai
Umpires: M. S. Mahal (Ind) and Satish Gupta (NZ)
Player of the match: Marcus Trescothick (Eng)

- England won the toss and elected to bat

== Tour matches ==
=== Three-day: Mumbai Board President's XI v England XI ===
18–19 November 2001
Scorecard

Mumbai Board President's XI	v	England XI
373/5 (90 overs); Vinod Kambli 109 (109); Richard Dawson 2/81 (24 overs)		370/5 (90 overs); Craig White 79 (72); Ramesh Powar 1/76 (28 overs)

Match drawn
Wankhede Stadium, Mumbai
Umpires: Vinayak Kulkarni (Ind) and Shavir Tarapore (Ind)

- England XI won the toss and elected to field.

=== Three-day: Indian Board President's XI v England XI ===
27–29 November 2001
Scorecard

England XI	v	Indian Board President's XI
320 (96.4 overs); Mark Ramprakash 105 (182); Sarandeep Singh 5/98 (24 overs)		339/7 (112 overs); Sridharan Sriram 149 (289); Martyn Ball 3/89 (27 overs)
163/9 (52 overs); Nasser Hussain 38 (64); Sanjay Bangar 5/32 (14 overs)

Match drawn
Lal Bahadur Shastri Stadium, Hyderabad
Umpires: G. A. Pratapkumar (Ind) and K. Parthasarathy (Ind)

- England XI won the toss and elected to bat.

=== Three-day: India A v England XI ===
22–24 November 2001
Scorecard

India A	v	England XI
233/9d (76.5 overs); Abhijit Kale 122 (220); Andrew Flintoff 3/47 (17 overs)		170 (62.3 overs); Nasser Hussain 40 (88); Iqbal Siddiqui 4/53 (21 overs)
109 (50.1 overs); Gautam Gambhir 30 (81); Craig White 5/31 (13 overs)		173/7 (55.1 overs); Nasser Hussain 59 (123); Gautam Gambhir 3/12 (6 overs)

England XI won by 3 wickets
Sawai Mansingh Stadium, Jaipur
Umpires: V. K. Ramaswamy (Ind) and Amiesh Saheba (Ind)

- England XI won the toss and elected to field.

=== One-day: Cricket Association of Bengal XI v England XI ===
17 January 2002
Scorecard

Cricket Association of Bengal XI; 150 (42.3 overs)	v	England XI; 219/5 (34 overs)
Rohan Gavaskar 27; Paul Collingwood 3/18 (5 overs)		Nick Knight 49 (r/o); Abhishek Ghosh 1/13 (2 overs)

England XI won by 8 wickets
Calcutta Cricket and Football Ground, Kolkata
Umpires: Subroto Banerjee (Ind) and Susanta Pathak (Ind)

- Cricket Association of Bengal XI won the toss and elected to bat.
- Cricket Association of Bengal XI played with 14 players (11 batting, 14 fielding) and England XI with 15 (11 batting, 15 fielding).
