= 2001–02 NKP Salve Challenger Trophy =

NKP Salve Challenger Trophy 2001/02
- Date: 10-13 January 2002
- Location: Bangalore, Karnataka, India
- Result: Won by India A
- Player of the series: Sarandeep Singh (India A)
Teams
India Seniors	India A	India B
Captains
(India) Sourav Ganguly	(India) VVS Laxman	(India) Anil Kumble
Most runs
Hemang Badani (170)	Sangram Singh (114)	Dinesh Mongia (133)
Most wickets
Sourav Ganguly (5)	Sarandeep Singh (9)	Anil Kumble (3)

The 8th NKP Salve Challenger Trophy was an Indian domestic cricket tournament that was held in Bangalore from 10 January to 13 January 2002. The series involved the domestic and national players from India who were allocated in India Seniors, India A, and India B. India A defeated India Seniors by 8 wickets in the final to become the champions of the tournament.

== Squads ==
India Seniors	India A	India B
Sourav Ganguly (c); SS Das; Virender Sehwag; Hemang Badani; Sanjay Bangar; Deep Dasgupta (wk); Harbhajan Singh; Sunil Joshi; Tinu Yohannan; Iqbal Siddiqui; Debasis Mohanty; Jacob Martin	VVS Laxman (c); Connor Williams; Daniel Manohar; Rohan Gavaskar; Sangram Singh; Yuvraj Singh; Ajay Ratra (wk); Reetinder Singh Sodhi; Murali Kartik; Zaheer Khan; Ajit Agarkar; Sarandeep Singh; Sitanshu Kotak	Anil Kumble (c); Mohammad Kaif; S Sriram; Dinesh Mongia; Hrishikesh Kanitkar; Arjun Yadav; Syed Zakaria Zuffri (wk); Vijay Bharadwaj; Pankaj Dharmani (wk); Ashish Nehra; Sanjay Pandey; Amit Bhandari; Devendra Bundela

== Points Table ==
Pos	Team	Pld	W	L	NR	Pts	NRR
1	India A	2	2	0	0	8	0.748
2	India Seniors	2	1	1	0	4	0.439
3	India B	2	0	2	0	0	−1.254

Source: 'Points Table'

== Matches ==
=== Group stage ===
10 January 2002

India Seniors; 229/9 (50 overs)	v	India A 235/8 (47.5 overs)
Hemang Badani 41 (36); Sarandeep Singh 3/36 (9 overs)		Yuvraj Singh 55 (77); Sourav Ganguly 4/40 (10 overs)

India A won by 2 wickets.
M. Chinnaswamy Stadium, Bangalore
Umpires: MS Mahal (IND) and Satish Gupta (IND)

- India Seniors won the toss and elected to bat.
- Points: India A 4, India Seniors 0

11 January 2002

India B 288/7 (50 overs)	v	India Seniors; 289/5 (39.5 overs)
Dinesh Mongia 131 (140); Harbhajan Singh 2/53 (10 overs)		Virender Sehwag 125 (93); Ashish Nehra 2/66 (10 overs)

India Seniors won by 5 wickets.
M. Chinnaswamy Stadium, Bangalore
Umpires: Krishna Hariharan (IND) and SK Sharma (IND)

- India B won the toss and elected to bat.
- Points: India Seniors 4, India B 0
- India Seniors were fined 3 overs for maintaining slow over rate. Hence, their target was 289 runs in 47 overs.

12 January 2002

India A 289/7 (50 overs)	v	India B 230 (38.4 overs)
Connor Williams 73 (91); Anil Kumble 2/47 (10 overs)		Mohammad Kaif 69 (68); Sarandeep Singh 5/57 (10 overs)

India A won by 59 runs.
M. Chinnaswamy Stadium, Bangalore
Umpires: Satish Gupta (IND) and MS Mahal (IND)

- India B won the toss and elected to bat.
- Points: India A 4, India B 0

== Final ==
13 January 2002

India Seniors; 154 (36 overs)	v	India A 157/2 (32 overs)
Hemang Badani 52 (55); Murali Kartik 3/28 (5 overs)		Sangram Singh 75 (78); Harbhajan Singh 2/30 (9 overs)

India A won by 8 wickets.
M. Chinnaswamy Stadium, Bangalore
Umpires: Krishna Hariharan (IND) and SK Sharma (IND)

- India Seniors won the toss and elected to bat.
- India A became the winners of the NKP Salve Challenger Trophy 2001/02.
