= Australian cricket team in India in 2000–01 =

International cricket tour

Australian cricket team in India in 2001
	Australia	India
- Dates: 17 February 2001 – 6 April 2001
Captains	Steve Waugh	Sourav Ganguly

Test series
- Result: India won the 3-match series 2–1
Most runs	Matthew Hayden (549)	VVS Laxman (503)
Most wickets	Glenn McGrath (17)	Harbhajan Singh (32)
- Player of the series: Harbhajan Singh (Ind)

One Day International series
- Results: Australia won the 5-match series 3–2
Most runs	Matthew Hayden (303)	VVS Laxman (291)
Most wickets	Glenn McGrath (10)	Javagal Srinath (9)
- Player of the series: Matthew Hayden (Aus)

The Australian cricket team toured India from February to April 2001 for a three-Test series and a five-match ODI series. The series is considered one of India's finest, as they secured victory against Australia in the Test series, in the process breaking Australia's 16-match win streak in Tests, and being the third side to win a Test match after being asked to follow-on during the match in Kolkata. The Kolkata match has been widely regarded as one of the greatest matches in the sport's history.

== Background ==
The Indian cricket team at the time was depleted, without leading leg spinner Anil Kumble. On the spinning tracks of India, this left them at a disadvantage, with the other spinners who had filled the void during the earlier part of the season being Sunil Joshi, Sarandeep Singh and Murali Kartik, all having played fewer than 10 Tests each.

Harbhajan Singh, whose previous best Test figures were only 3/30, was entrusted with a heavy burden, having been recalled at the behest of captain Sourav Ganguly after previous instances of indiscipline. He was to lead the spin attack against an Australian team which had set a world record with 16 consecutive Test victories, and was searching for its first series victory on Indian soil since 1969. In the first Test, his spinning partner was Rahul Sanghvi, a debutant.

== Squads ==
India		Australia	
Tests	ODIs	Tests	ODIs
Sourav Ganguly (c); Rahul Dravid (vc); Sadagoppan Ramesh; Shiv Sunder Das; Sachin Tendulkar; VVS Laxman; Hemang Badani; Nayan Mongia (wk); Sameer Dighe (wk); Javagal Srinath; Zaheer Khan; Ajit Agarkar; Rahul Sanghvi; Harbhajan Singh; Narendra Hirwani; Venkatesh Prasad; Ashish Nehra; Sarandeep Singh; Venkatapathy Raju; Sairaj Bahutule; Nilesh Kulkarni	Sourav Ganguly (c); Rahul Dravid (vc); Sachin Tendulkar; VVS Laxman; Virender Sehwag; Hemang Badani; Dinesh Mongia; Vijay Dahiya (wk); Robin Singh; Sunil Joshi; Harbhajan Singh; Javagal Srinath; Zaheer Khan; Ajit Agarkar; Sarandeep Singh	Steve Waugh (c); Adam Gilchrist (vc); Damien Fleming; Jason Gillespie; Matthew Hayden; Michael Kasprowicz; Justin Langer; Damien Martyn; Glenn McGrath; Colin Miller; Ricky Ponting; Michael Slater; Shane Warne; Mark Waugh	Steve Waugh (c); Adam Gilchrist (vc); Michael Bevan; Nathan Bracken; Damien Fleming; Jason Gillespie; Ian Harvey; Darren Lehmann; Matthew Hayden; Damien Martyn; Glenn McGrath; Ricky Ponting; Shane Warne; Mark Waugh

== Tour matches ==
=== Three-day: India A v Australians ===
17–19 February 2001
Scorecard

Australians	v	India A
291 (69.1 overs); Michael Kasprowicz 92 (114); Rahul Sanghvi 5/40 (18.1 overs)		368 (95 overs); Sadagoppan Ramesh 101 (158); Colin Miller 6/90 (32 overs)
365/9 (95.1 overs); Justin Langer 115 (157); Harbhajan Singh 3/81 (20 overs)

Match drawn
Vidarbha Cricket Association Ground, Nagpur
Umpires: B. K. Sadashiva (Ind) and SV Ramani (Ind)

- Australians won the toss and elected to bat.

=== Three-day: Mumbai v Australians ===
22–24 February 2001
Scorecard

Mumbai	v	Australians
328/9d (94 overs); Sameer Dighe 84 (178); Glenn McGrath 3/46 (19 overs)		203 (64.3 overs); Steve Waugh 106 (162); Nilesh Kulkarni 4/39 (25 overs)
191/8d (67.3 overs); Vinayak Mane 57 (108); Shane Warne 7/56 (21.3 overs)		141/6 (55 overs); Steve Waugh 34* (101); Sairaj Bahutule 4/38 (15 overs)

Match drawn
Brabourne Stadium, Mumbai
Umpires: Amiesh Saheba (Ind) and MS Mahal (Ind)

- Mumbai won the toss and elected to bat.

=== Three-day: Indian Board President's XI v Australians ===
6–8 March 2001
Scorecard

Australians	v	Indian Board President's XI
451 (100 overs); Steve Waugh 109 (165); Sarandeep Singh 5/114 (26 overs)		221 (66.4 overs); Dinesh Mongia 66 (107); Michael Kasprowicz 3/68 (18 overs)
461/7 (93 overs); Mark Waugh 164 (181); Narendra Hirwani 5/168 (38 overs)

Match drawn
Feroz Shah Kotla, Delhi
Umpires: Sanjeeva Rao (Ind) and Subrata Banerjee (Ind)

- Australians won the toss and elected to bat.

=== 40-over match: India XI v Australians ===
23 March 2001
Scorecard

India XI; 338/8 (40 overs)	v	Australians; 184 (27.1 overs)
Sachin Tendulkar 93 (49); Jock Campbell 2/3 (1 over)		Michael Bevan 58 (35); Virender Sehwag 3/19 (3 overs)

India XI won by 154 runs
M. A. Chidambaram Stadium, Chepauk, Chennai
Umpires: KG Lakshminarayan (Ind) and KR Shankar (Ind)

- India XI won the toss and elected to field.

The match was played for the benefit of the 'Gujarat Earthquake Victims' and sponsored by Siyaram's. All the proceeds from this benefit match went to the Gujarat Relief Fund. In another noble gesture, all district associations affiliated with the Tamil Nadu Cricket Association donated ₹110,000 (US$118,721.90) to the relief fund.

== Test series ==
=== First Test ===
27 February–3 March 2001
Scorecard

India	v	Australia
176 (71.3 overs); Sachin Tendulkar 76 (114); Shane Warne 4/47 (22 overs)		349 (73.2 overs); Adam Gilchrist 122 (112); Harbhajan Singh 4/121 (28 overs)
219 (94.1 overs); Sachin Tendulkar 65 (107); Mark Waugh 3/40 (15 overs)		47/0 (7 overs); Matthew Hayden 28* (21)

Australia won by 10 wickets
Wankhede Stadium, Mumbai
Umpires: David Shepherd and Srinivas Venkataraghavan
Player of the match: Adam Gilchrist (Aus)

- Australia won the toss and elected to field.

The start of the First Test in Mumbai was overshadowed by the death of Sir Donald Bradman, universally regarded as the greatest batsman in cricket history. After a minute's silence, Australian captain Steve Waugh won the toss and elected to field on a pitch offering assistance to the bowling team. Ganguly stated that he would have done likewise. The Australian fast bowlers quickly removed India's top order, with both openers and Rahul Dravid removed in the first hour's play with only 31 runs scored. After Ganguly was removed with the score on 55, the Indians progressed to be 4/62 at lunch. Sachin Tendulkar lead a counterattack in the hour after lunch, scoring 53 runs in 53 balls to take the score to 4/130 before V. V. S. Laxman was removed. The innings lost momentum when Tendulkar was dismissed for 76, leaving the score at 6/139. India were eventually bowled out in the final session for 176. Shane Warne took 4/47 while Glenn McGrath managed 3/19. In reply, Australia reached 1/49 at stumps, losing Michael Slater.

Australia made steady progress on the second day to reach 1/71, when Harbhajan dismissed Justin Langer. Mark Waugh, the new batsman, was dismissed for a golden duck after Ganguly took a one-handed close-range diving catch from the next delivery. Sanghvi dismissed Steve Waugh, and Harbhajan removed Ricky Ponting for a duck in the following over to reduce Australia to 5/99 after the first-hour play, with Harbhajan taking a spell of 3/8. Australian wicketkeeper Adam Gilchrist joined opener Matthew Hayden at the crease, who had just reached 50. After the break, Gilchrist led a counterattack, scoring 36 from 39 balls, and Australia reached lunch at 5/170, scoring 71 runs in the second hour. The batting pace increased after lunch, with Gilchrist moving from 50 to 100 in just 29 balls. 96 runs were added in the hour after lunch and after the 197-run partnership ended in 32 overs, Gilchrist and Hayden had scored 122 and 119 respectively. Australia reached 8/329 at tea, compiling 158 runs in the session. A run a ball cameo of 39 from Warne allowed Australia to reach 349, a lead of 173. Harbhajan ended with 4/121. India's top order fared better in the second innings, managing to compile 58 before both openers were lost. they suffered a last scare when wicket-keeper Nayan Mongia, sent in as a nightwatchman was forced to retire hurt after suffering a finger injury, forcing Tendulkar to face the final over of the second day.

India resumed on the third day 115 runs behind, with Tendulkar yet to score and Rahul Dravid having made only six runs from 41 deliveries. They made slow progress, with Dravid taking 41 deliveries to move from six to seven runs. Only 19 runs were scored in the first hour. A further 39 were scored in the second hour before lunch as India concentrated on preserving wickets. Tendulkar counterattacked again after lunch as he did on the first day, with India accumulating 34 runs in seven overs. This ended when a pull shot by Tendulkar from a Mark Waugh long hop hit Langer in the back, who had taken evasive action from his close catching position, and rebounded in the air to be caught by Ponting for 65. After Ganguly was run out for 1, Laxman and Dravid departed in consecutive overs, leaving India at 6/174. Dravid had occupied the crease for 196 balls in compiling 39 runs. The tail was eventually dismissed for 219, with only Mongia's 29 the only other resistance. Tendulkar was the only Indian to pass 50 in the match, and the batting display was epitomised by injured fast bowler Javagal Srinath, who attempted to bat with only one hand and was dismissed without scoring. The other notable event in the Indian innings was a mistimed pull shot from Dravid, which saw an attempted diving catch by Slater. Slater claimed the catch, but Dravid and umpire Srinivas Venkataraghavan disagreed. Slater angrily confronted both men with lengthy verbal outbursts. Australia recorded the 47 runs required for victory without losing a wicket in just seven overs, winning their 16th consecutive Test victory. Ganguly was booed off the ground, and Steve Waugh hailed an "outstanding team performance" by Australia. Gilchrist was named man of the match with 122 and six catches.

=== Second Test ===
11—15 March 2001
Scorecard

Australia	v	India
445 (131.5 overs); Steve Waugh 110 (203); Harbhajan Singh 7/123 (37.5 overs)		171 (58.1 overs); VVS Laxman 59 (83); Glenn McGrath 4/18 (14 overs)
212 (68.3 overs); Matthew Hayden 67 (118); Harbhajan Singh 6/73 (30.3 overs)		657/7d (178 overs) (f/o); VVS Laxman 281 (452); Glenn McGrath 3/103 (39 overs)

India won by 171 runs
Eden Gardens, Kolkata
Umpires: Shyam Bansal and Peter Willey
Player of the match: VVS Laxman (Ind)

- Australia won the toss and elected to bat.
- This was the third time in Test history (the first time for India) that a side won after following on. Australia was the losing team on all three occasions.
- Harbhajan's first innings hat-trick was the first ever by an Indian in Test cricket.
- Laxman's innings of 281 was the highest, at the time, by an Indian in Tests, surpassing Sunil Gavaskar's record of 236 not out.
- Dravid's innings of 180 was his ninth Test century and first against Australia.
- Gilchrist became the first Australian to be dismissed for a king pair in Test cricket.
- The Indian victory ended a 16 Test winning streak for Steve Waugh's team, which was a world record.
- This was the only time in test history that a team was able to declare the follow-on innings and still win the test match.

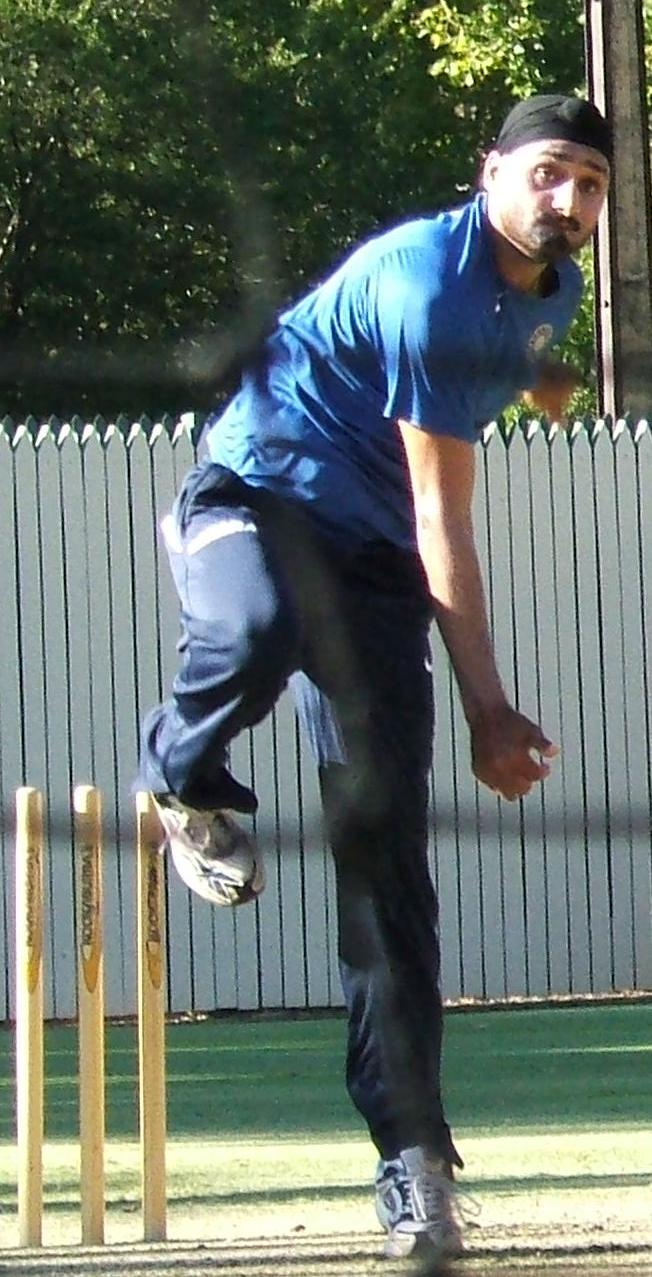
Harbhajan, pictured here bowling in the nets, became the first Indian to take a Test hat-trick.

With leading paceman Javagal Srinath ruled out of the series with a finger injury during the First Test, the teams met for the Second Test in Kolkata, with an even bigger burden on Harbhajan. Public opinion was sceptical about India's chances of stopping Australia's winning streak, with former captain Bishan Bedi lamenting the demise of Indian cricket. Australia were again in control on the first day, scoring 193/1, with Hayden having struck Harbhajan out of the attack. Harbhajan fought back to reduce Australia to 252/7, taking five wickets in the final session, including Ricky Ponting, Adam Gilchrist and Shane Warne in successive balls to become the first Indian to claim a Test hat-trick. After a prolonged wait for the third umpire to adjudicate whether Sadagoppan Ramesh had managed to catch Warne before the ball hit the ground, the near-capacity crowd at Eden Gardens erupted when he was given out. Harbhajan eventually finished with 7/123 as Australia were bowled out for 445. India batted poorly, although Laxman scored 59, and were all out for 171, trailing by 274 runs.

Australia enforced the follow-on, and India seemed to be all but out of the match, and the series, after McGrath got Ganguly out on 48, with India at 232/4. But then came an epic 376-run partnership between V. V. S. Laxman and Rahul Dravid. The duo batted together for an entire day, Laxman scoring 281 and Dravid scoring 180. This allowed India to declare early on the final day at 657/7, with a 383 run lead, setting Australia an imposing target of 384 to win.

Australia appeared to be safely batting out the match for a draw, until losing 7/56 in the final session, collapsing from 166/3 to be bowled out for 212. Tendulkar took three LBW wickets and Harbhajan claimed four of the wickets, to finish with 6/73 for the innings and a match tally of 13/196. India ended Australia's 16-match world record winning streak, and became only the third team to win a Test after being forced to follow on, with Australia having been the losing team on all three occasions.

=== Third Test ===
18–22 March 2001
Scorecard

Australia	v	India
391 (115.2 overs); Matthew Hayden 203 (320); Harbhajan Singh 7/133 (38.2 overs)		501 (165 overs); Sachin Tendulkar 126 (230); Glenn McGrath 3/75 (36 overs)
264 (97.5 overs); Mark Waugh 57 (139); Harbhajan Singh 8/84 (41.5 overs)		155/8 (41.1 overs); VVS Laxman 66 (82); Colin Miller 3/41 (9 overs)

India won by 2 wickets
M. A. Chidambaram Stadium, Chepauk, Chennai
Umpires: Arani Jayaprakash and Rudi Koertzen
Player of the match: Harbhajan Singh (Ind) and Matthew Hayden (Aus)

- Australia won the toss and elected to bat.

The teams arrived in Chennai for the deciding Third Test, and Australia's batsmen again seized control after winning the toss, reaching 340/3 on the second morning. Then, Australian captain Steve Waugh padded away a delivery from Harbhajan. The ball spun back into Waugh's stumps, who pushed the ball away with his glove, becoming only the sixth batsman in Tests to be given out "handled the ball". Waugh's dismissal instigated another Australian batting collapse, losing 6 wickets for 51 runs to be bowled out for 391, with Harbhajan taking all six in a spell of 6/26, to finish with 7/133. After India's batsmen gained a first-innings lead of 110 on the back of a third consecutive Chennai Test hundred by Sachin Tendulkar, the Australian batsmen were again unable to cope with Harbhajan in the second innings, who took 8/84 to end with match figures of 15/217. India appeared to be heading for an easy victory at 101/2 chasing 155, before losing 6/50 to be 151/8. Perhaps fittingly, Harbhajan walked to the crease, and struck the winning runs.

He was named man of the match and man of the series, having taken 32 wickets in the series, when none of his team-mates managed more than 3. The Wisden 100 study conducted by Wisden in 2002 rated all four of Harbhajan's efforts in the Second and Third Tests in the top 100 bowling performances of all time, the most for any bowler. He paid tribute to his father, who had died just six months earlier. His performance led to him usurping Anil Kumble's position as India's first-choice spinner.

== ODI series ==
=== First ODI ===
25 March 2001 (D/N)
Scorecard

India; 315 (50 overs)	v	Australia; 255 (43 overs)
Rahul Dravid 80 (84); Glenn McGrath 2/60 (9.5 overs)		Matthew Hayden 99 (90); Javagal Srinath 3/49 (7.3 overs)

India won by 60 runs
M. Chinnaswamy Stadium, Bangalore
Umpires: Devinder Sharma (Ind) and SK Sharma (Ind)
Player of the match: Virender Sehwag (Ind)

- India won the toss and elected to bat.
- Vijay Dahiya (51) became the first India wicketkeeper-batsman to score a half-century against Australia in ODIs.
- Sourav Ganguly claimed his 50th catch in ODIs.
- India's 60-run victory was their best against Australia in ODIs, in terms of runs.

=== Second ODI ===
28 March 2001
Scorecard

India; 248/9 (50 overs)	v	Australia; 249/2 (45.1 overs)
Hemang Badani 100 (98); Damien Fleming 2/39 (10 overs)		Mark Waugh 133* (138); Zaheer Khan 1/26 (6 overs)

Australia won by 8 wickets
Nehru Stadium, Pune
Umpires: Satish Gupta (Ind) and Ivaturi Shivram (Ind)
Player of the match: Mark Waugh (Aus)

- India won the toss and elected to bat.
- Dinesh Mongia (Ind) made his debut in ODIs.
- Hemang Badani (Ind) scored his first century in ODIs.
- Mark Waugh (Aus) bettered his own record (126) for the highest individual score against India in ODIs (133) for an Australia player.
- Mark Waugh surpassed Steve Waugh for the most Man of the Match award wins in ODIs (22).

=== Third ODI ===
31 March 2001
Scorecard

India; 299/8 (50 overs)	v	Australia; 181 (35.5 overs)
Sachin Tendulkar 139 (125); Glenn McGrath 3/52 (10 overs)		Adam Gilchrist 63 (70); Harbhajan Singh 3/37 (9 overs)

India won by 118 runs
Nehru Stadium, Indore
Umpires: Vijay Chopra (Ind) and Krishna Hariharan (Ind)
Player of the match: Sachin Tendulkar (Ind)

- Australia won the toss and elected to field.
- Sachin Tendulkar (Ind) became the first player to reach 10,000 runs in ODIs.

=== Fourth ODI ===
3 April 2001
Scorecard

Australia; 338/4 (50 overs)	v	India; 245 (45 overs)
Matthew Hayden 111 (113); Harbhajan Singh 1/58 (10 overs)		Sachin Tendulkar 62 (38); Steve Waugh 3/29 (6 overs)

Australia won by 93 runs
Indira Priyadarshini Stadium, Visakhapatnam
Umpires: GA Pratapkumar and Shavir Tarapore
Player of the match: Matthew Hayden (Aus)

- Australia won the toss and elected to bat.
- Matthew Hayden (Aus) scored his first century in ODIs.
- Shane Warne (Aus) claimed his 250th wicket in ODIs.

=== Fifth ODI ===
6 April 2001
Scorecard

India; 265/6 (50 overs)	v	Australia; 269/6 (48 overs)
VVS Laxman 101 (107); Ian Harvey 2/49 (10 overs)		Michael Bevan 87* (113); Sachin Tendulkar 3/35 (10 overs)

Australia won by 4 wickets
Nehru Stadium, Fatorda, Margao
Umpires: Francis Gomes and Subroto Porel
Player of the match: Michael Bevan (Aus)

- India won the toss and elected to bat.
- VVS Laxman (Ind) scored his first century in ODIs.
- Sachin Tendulkar (Ind) claimed his 100th wicket in ODIs.
