= Second Test, 2000–01 Border–Gavaskar Trophy =

International cricket match

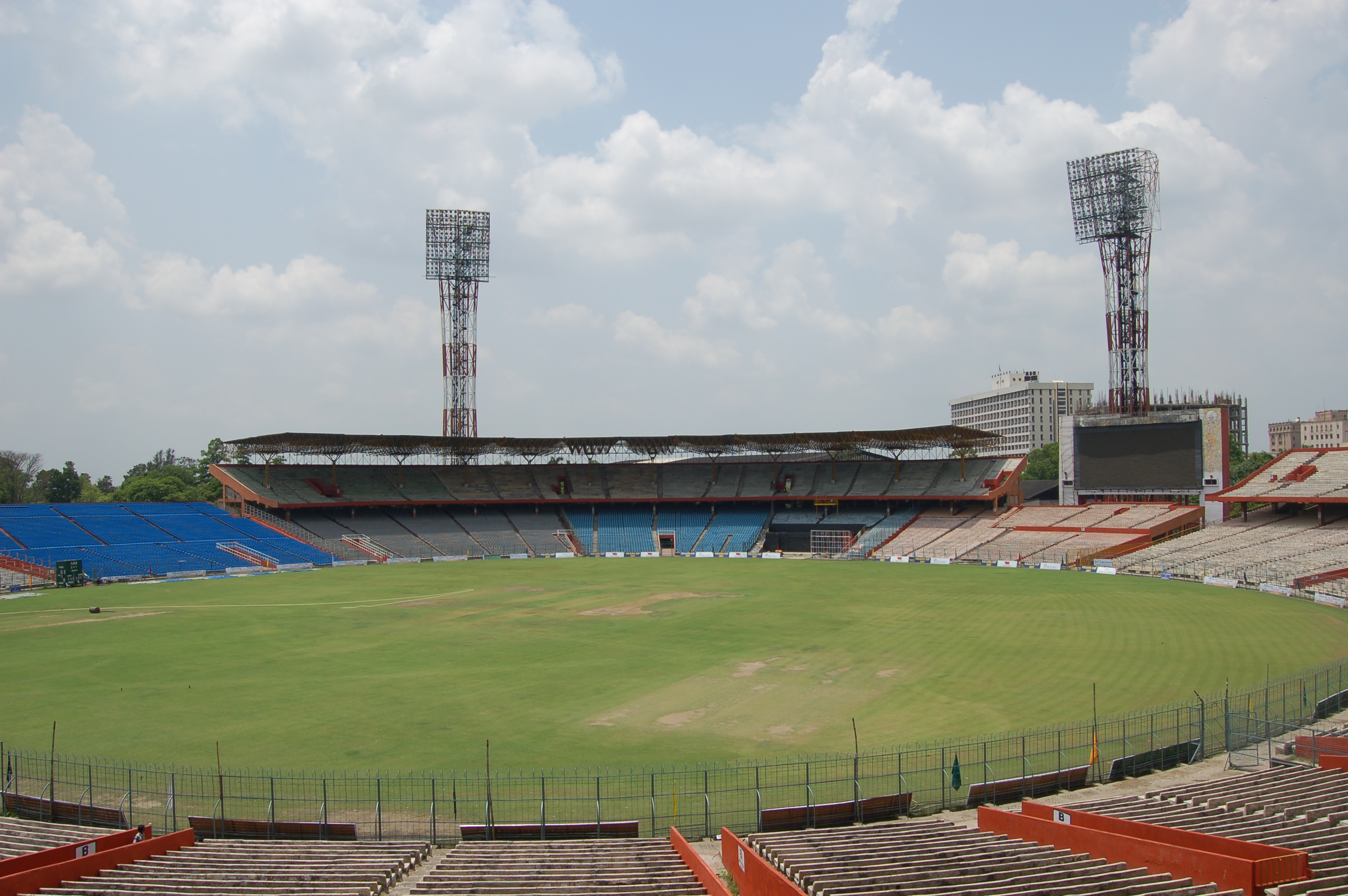
- Eden Gardens, the venue for the Second Test
Australia	India
(Australia)	(India)
445	171
131.2 overs	58.1 overs
&	&
212	657/7d (f/o)
68.3 overs	178 overs
- India won by 171 runs
- Date: 11–15 March 2001
- Venue: Eden Gardens, Kolkata
- Player of the match: (India) V V S Laxman
- Umpires: (India) S. K. Bansal; (England) Peter Willey; (India) Sameer Bandekar (third umpire)

The Second Test in the Australian cricket team's tour of India in early 2001 was a Test match played over five days at Eden Gardens in Kolkata from 11–15 March 2001. India won the match by 171 runs after being forced to follow-on, only the third time this has happened since Test cricket began in 1877.

The Australian team, rated as the best in the world, had won 16 Tests in a row, a Test cricket record, including the previous Test at Wankhede Stadium in Mumbai by 10 wickets.

The match is remembered for VVS Laxman and Rahul Dravid's batting performance, Harbhajan Singh's hattrick and last day wicket-taking, Sachin Tendulkar's wicket-taking spell on the final day and Sourav Ganguly's aggressive brand of captaincy in deciding to go for the improbable victory and not just a draw. Also of note were Australia's first innings performances, particularly that of captain Steve Waugh and Matthew Hayden. The Test is most noted for its fourth day. After India trailed by more than 250 runs in the first innings, Dravid and Laxman batted the entirety of day four to build up a lead of 384. In the process, Laxman also posted what was, at that time, the highest individual score by an Indian (later to be surpassed by Virender Sehwag's two triple centuries and Karun Nair's triple century). It is widely considered to be one of the greatest test matches in cricket history and was voted in 2025 as the greatest Test match of the 21st century so far in an ESPNCricinfo poll.

== Summary ==
=== Day 1 ===
Steve Waugh won the toss and decided to bat first. Michael Slater and Matthew Hayden gave the visitors a strong foundation putting on 103 for the opening wicket. Slater was dismissed by Zaheer Khan but Hayden, given a life on 67 when he sliced a drive to Rahul Dravid off Zaheer continued to score freely. He added another 90 runs with Justin Langer to take Australia to 193/1 by tea, and another Australian romp seemed imminent. Harbhajan Singh then dismissed Hayden for 93 immediately after tea, sparking a dramatic collapse from 193/1 to 252/7 and subsequently 269/8. Khan had Langer caught behind, and Harbhajan dismissed the dangerous Mark Waugh to make it 236/4; he then proceeded to take the first ever international test hat-trick by an Indian bowler as he dismissed Ponting, Gilchrist and Warne off successive deliveries.

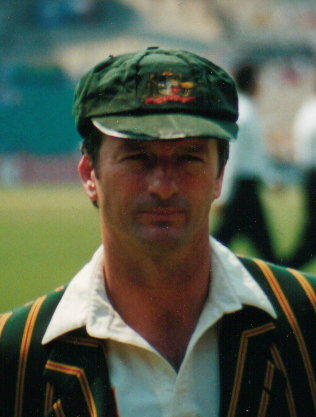
Steve Waugh (pictured in 2002) scored 110 in the first innings.

Ricky Ponting was the first to go, beaten by one pushed quicker through the air. Gilchrist was adjudged lbw off a similar delivery but had cause to be aggrieved; replays showed the ball pitched well outside legstump and that he had some bat on the ball. With Harbhajan on a hattrick, Shane Warne was surrounded by men around the bat, with Sadagopan Ramesh at short leg the man who eventually claimed the catch from a tentative prod. The on field umpires referred it to the third umpire, who took a long time making the tough decision before finally declaring Warne out. An emotional Harbhajan later remembered his father in the post match interview; his captain Sourav Ganguly called it a performance that brought India back into the match.

Forced to bring himself on to bowl when Zaheer Khan walked off with cramp, Ganguly dismissed Kasprowicz lbw to leave Australia at 269/8 by the end of Day 1 with Steve Waugh batting on 29 with Jason Gillespie for company. Australia, having dominated the first two sessions, had lost 7 wickets in one session to squander the advantage.

=== Day 2 ===
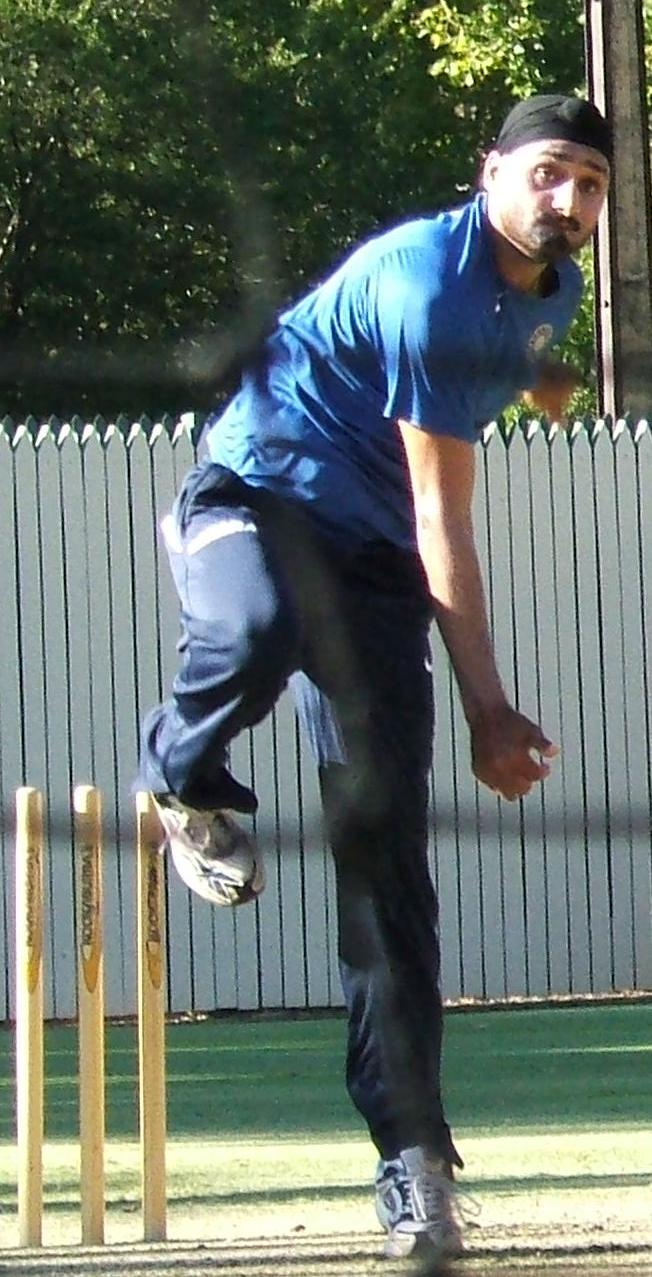
Harbhajan, pictured here bowling in the nets, became the first Indian to take a Test hat-trick.

Led from the front by Steve Waugh, Australia began the day at a precarious 291/8 but that was the high of the day for India. The 35 year old Waugh batted well with Gillespie and then Glenn McGrath, crossing numerous landmarks on the way, as he took Australia to a total of 445. In the process the Australian captain notched up his 25th Test century, crossing Sachin Tendulkar's tally of 24 hundreds at the time. Having never made a Test hundred in India, Waugh was more emotional than normal as he tugged at the red handkerchief in his pocket, took off his helmet and raised his bat to a full house Eden crowd. He also passed Javed Miandad to become the (then) 4th highest run getter in test cricket.

Waugh was given able support by Gillespie, who batted for over 3 hours, facing nearly 150 deliveries to score 46, his then-highest test score. He helped add 133 with Steve Waugh – Australia's highest 9th wicket partnership in tests against India. After Gillespie was dismissed with the scoreboard reading 402/9, Waugh rubbed more salt into the wound to add 43 more with McGrath and take Australia to a formidable total of 445. The last 2 wickets had added 176 and day 1 seemed a distant memory. Worse, however, was to come.

India began their innings poorly. Steve Waugh, with runs to work with, attacked from the beginning with as many as 7 men catching. Opener Sadagoppan Ramesh duly obliged to Jason Gillespie, edging one to Ponting in the slips without a single run on the board. Shiv Sunder Das and Rahul Dravid played out the remainder of the session to take India to 32/1 at tea. The final session was again the most dramatic, as India then collapsed from a cautious 34/1 to 113/8. Wickets fell regularly as Das was soon followed by the celebrated Indian middle order. Tendulkar played across one from McGrath and was adjudged lbw, Dravid lost his stumps to Warne and Ganguly was snapped up brilliantly by Steve Waugh at gully. India ended Day 2 on 128/8 with the two Hyderabadis VVS Laxman and Venkatapathy Raju at the crease, still needing 118 more to avoid the follow-on. India had lost 7 wickets in a session, just like the Australians the previous day, and Australia looked odds-on favourites to extend their winning streak to 17.

=== Day 3 ===
India showed more determination than they had done in 5 days of test cricket before this one. First the tail wagged (if not in Australian proportions); the last two wickets added 58 runs in the company of VVS Laxman who batting at No.6 stroked 59. Laxman was the last man out, a tad unfairly perhaps – replays showed the ball popped up off his arm – as India were bowled out for 171, 274 in arrears. As expected, Steve Waugh asked India to follow-on.

This time though, the openers began solidly; putting on 50 for the first time in the series. When Ramesh was dismissed, Ganguly sent in VVS Laxman. Rahul Dravid had been struggling for runs for a while and Laxman had been stroking the ball well before his unfortunate dismissal. Laxman had been asked to open the innings in this match but had refused. He seemed to pick up from where he had left off, batting serenely, and at times aggressively – a reminder that there were no demons in the pitch. Das departed, unfortunate to hit the stumps with his heels whilst executing an immaculate pull shot to end a promising partnership with Laxman. Tendulkar soon followed, for a second failure in the match, but Laxman found a willing ally in Sourav Ganguly. The pair set about repairing the damage done by raising a hundred for the 4th wicket, but just when it seemed India was going to end the day with some semblance of balance, McGrath induced an edge that was lapped up gleefully by Gilchrist to dismiss Ganguly 2 runs short of a deserved half century. Out came Rahul Dravid, with the scorecard reading 232/4. Laxman duly completed a hundred in Dravid's company.

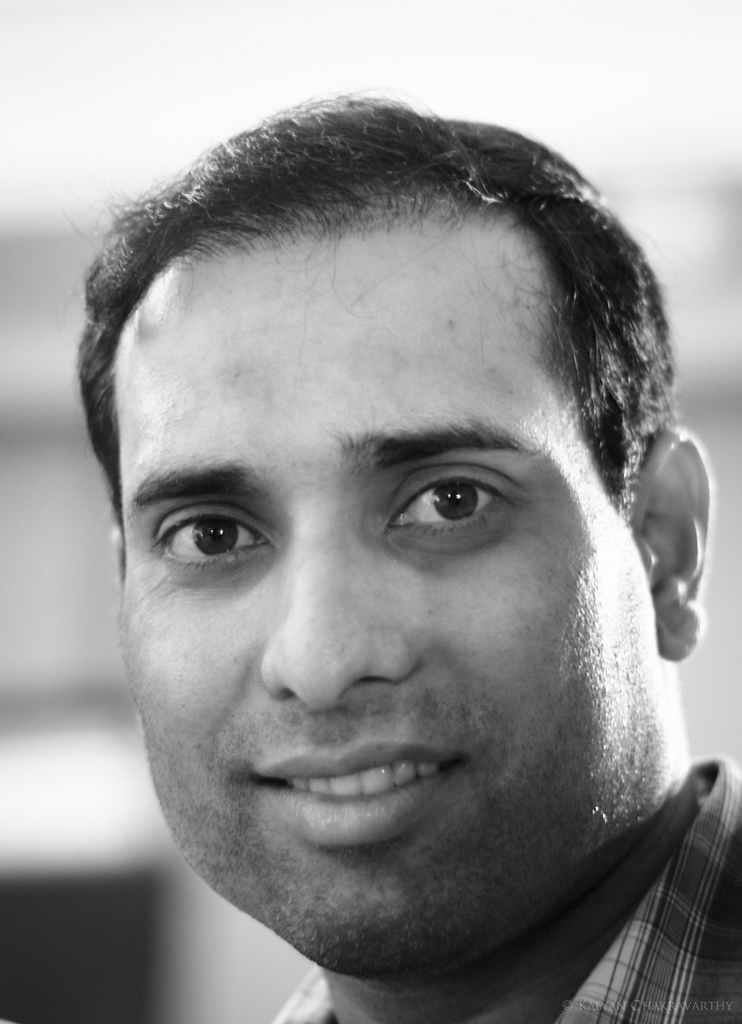
VVS Laxman scored 281 runs and was the highest run scorer for India in both innings.

India ended the day with 252 on the board for the loss of 4 wickets. Laxman had scored a masterful unbeaten 109 and keeping him company was the woefully out of form Dravid on 7. India were still trailing by 20 and while Laxman may have given India some joy, it seemed only a matter of time before the inevitable happened.

=== Day 4 ===
The fourth day was one in which numerous records tumbled and the game changed dramatically with an incredible partnership between Laxman and Dravid. Laxman struck 44 fours on his way to a record-breaking double hundred. With a single off Matthew Hayden, he crossed the mark of 236 set by Sunil Gavaskar against West Indies at Chennai in 1983 for the highest score by an Indian batsman in tests. Dravid, meanwhile, also reached his century and celebrated in uncharacteristic fashion gesturing to the press box, having been criticised in the media for his recent poor form.

Astonishingly, the two batted out the whole day without being dismissed and took India to 589/4, leading by 315.

=== Day 5 ===
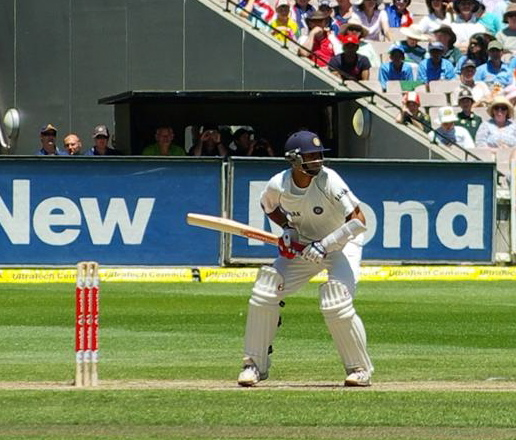
Rahul Dravid (pictured in 2007) scored 180 runs in India's second innings.

Laxman (281) and Dravid (180) both departed to standing ovations from the capacity Eden Gardens crowd. The two eventually added 376 in that game-changing stand. Zaheer Khan then scored some quick runs as India declared on 657/7 13 overs into the final day, setting Australia a target of 384 in a minimum of 75 overs. With a required rate of over 5 runs, an Australian win was almost certainly out of the question. The openers Hayden and Slater again began well as Australia reached 166/3 in 45 overs. With only 30 overs remaining in the day and Steve Waugh looking solid, a draw seemed to be on the cards. But Harbhajan Singh dismissed Waugh and Ponting in quick succession to trigger a dramatic Australian capitulation. Tendulkar then removed Gilchrist for a first ball duck, completing Gilchrist's first and only king pair. It was only his 16th game, and he had won all 15 previous games. In his next two overs, Tendulkar dismissed Hayden and trapped Warne lbw with a perfectly pitched googly. Harbhajan then took the final two wickets to take his match tally to 13 wickets and complete a sensational 171 run Indian victory. It was only the third instance of a team winning the match after following on in the history of international cricket, with Australia on the losing side on all 3 occasions.

== Scorecard ==
=== Summary ===
11—15 March 2001
Scorecard

Australia	v	India
445 (131.5 overs); Steve Waugh 110 (203); Harbhajan Singh 7/123 (37.5 overs)		171 (58.1 overs); VVS Laxman 59 (83); Glenn McGrath 4/18 (14 overs)
212 (68.3 overs); Matthew Hayden 67 (118); Harbhajan Singh 6/73 (30.3 overs)		657/7d (178 overs) (f/o); VVS Laxman 281 (452); Glenn McGrath 3/103 (39 overs)

India won by 171 runs
Eden Gardens, Kolkata
Umpires: Shyam Bansal and Peter Willey
Player of the match: VVS Laxman (Ind)

- Australia won the toss and elected to bat.
- This was the third time in Test history (the first time for India) that a side won after following on. Australia was the losing team on all three occasions.
- Harbhajan's first innings hat-trick was the first ever by an Indian in Test cricket.
- Laxman's innings of 281 was the highest, at the time, by an Indian in Tests, surpassing Sunil Gavaskar's record of 236 not out.
- Dravid's innings of 180 was his ninth Test century and first against Australia.
- Gilchrist became the first Australian to be dismissed for a king pair in Test cricket.
- The Indian victory ended a 16 Test winning streak for Steve Waugh's team, which was a world record.

=== Australian innings ===
Australia	First Innings		Second Innings (target 384)	
Batsman	Method of dismissal	Runs	Method of dismissal	Runs
M. J. Slater	c Mongia b Khan	42 (99)	c Ganguly b Harbhajan Singh	43 (79)
M. L. Hayden	c sub H. K. Badani b Khan	97 (157)	lbw b Tendulkar	67 (118)
J. L. Langer	c Mongia b Harbhajan Singh	58 (91)	c Ramesh b Harbhajan Singh	28 (21)
M. E. Waugh	c Mongia b Harbhajan Singh	22 (31)	lbw b Raju	0 (10)
* S. R. Waugh	lbw b Harbhajan Singh	110 (203)	c sub H. K. Badani b Harbhajan Singh	24 (58)
R. T. Ponting	lbw b Harbhajan Singh	6 (12)	c Das b Harbhajan Singh	0 (4)
+ A. C. Gilchrist	lbw b Harbhajan Singh	0 (1)	lbw b Tendulkar	0 (1)
S. K. Warne	c Ramesh b Harbhajan Singh	0 (1)	lbw b Tendulkar	0 (7)
M. S. Kasprowicz	lbw b Ganguly	7 (28)	not out	13* (56)
J. N. Gillespie	c Ramesh b Harbhajan Singh	46 (147)	c Das b Harbhajan Singh	6 (38)
G. D. McGrath	not out	21* (28)	lbw b Harbhajan Singh	12 (27)
Extras		36		19
Total	(131.5 overs)	445	(68.3 overs)	212

India	First Innings				Second Innings			
Bowler	Overs	Maidens	Runs	Wickets	Overs	Maidens	Runs	Wickets
Z. Khan	28.4	6	89	2	8	4	30	0
B. K. V. Prasad	30	5	95	0	3	1	7	0
S. C. Ganguly	13.2	3	44	1	1	0	2	0
S. L. V. Raju	20	2	58	0	15	3	58	1
Harbhajan Singh	37.5	7	123	7	30.3	8	73	6
S. R. Tendulkar	2	0	7	0	11	3	31	3

=== Indian innings ===
India	First Innings		Second Innings (following on)	
Batsman	Method of dismissal	Runs	Method of dismissal	Runs
S. S. Das	c Gilchrist b McGrath	20 (48)	hit wicket b Gillespie	39 (99)
S. Ramesh	c Ponting b Gillespie	0 (3)	c M.Waugh b Warne	30 (43)
R. Dravid	b Warne	25 (82)	run out	180 (353)
S. R. Tendulkar	lbw b McGrath	10 (18)	c Gilchrist b Gillespie	10 (23)
* S. C. Ganguly	c S. Waugh b Kasprowicz	23 (51)	c Gilchrist b McGrath	48 (81)
V. V. S. Laxman	c Hayden b Warne	59 (83)	c Ponting b McGrath	281 (452)
+ N. R. Mongia	c Gilchrist b Kasprowicz	2 (4)	b McGrath	4 (10)
Harbhajan Singh	c Ponting b Gillespie	4 (15)	not out	8 (6)
Z. Khan	b McGrath	3 (19)	not out	23* (15)
S. L. V. Raju	lbw b McGrath	4 (15)	–	–
B. K. V. Prasad	not out	7* (23)	–	–
Extras		14		34
Total	(58.1 overs)	171	(7 wickets declared; 178 overs)	657

Australia	First Innings				Second Innings			
Bowler	Overs	Maidens	Runs	Wickets	Overs	Maidens	Runs	Wickets
G. D. McGrath	14	8	18	4	39	12	103	3
J. N. Gillespie	11	0	47	2	31	6	115	2
M. S. Kasprowicz	13	2	39	2	35	6	139	0
S. K. Warne	20.1	3	65	2	34	3	152	1
M. E. Waugh	–	–	–	–	18	1	58	0
R. T. Ponting	–	–	–	–	12	1	41	0
M. L. Hayden	–	–	–	–	6	0	24	0
M. J. Slater	–	–	–	–	2	1	4	0
J. L. Langer	–	–	–	–	1	0	3	0

== See also ==
- Second Test, 2007–08 Border–Gavaskar Trophy
- Fourth Test, 2022–23 Border–Gavaskar Trophy
- 2023 World Test Championship final
- 2003 Cricket World Cup final
- 2023 Cricket World Cup final
