= 1998–99 Pepsi Cup =

1998–99 Pepsi Triangular Series
- Date: 19 March – 4 April 1999
- Location: India
- Result: Pakistan won the final by 123 runs
- Player of the series: Sourav Ganguly (Ind)
Teams
| India | Pakistan | Sri Lanka |
Captains
| Mohammad Azharuddin (Note: Mohammad Azharuddin was appointed captain of the Indian team side prior to the start of the series. However, he missed the last three matches with Ajay Jadeja captaining the side.) | Wasim Akram | Arjuna Ranatunga |
Most runs
| Sourav Ganguly 278 | Inzamam-ul-Haq 214 | Mahela Jayawardene 191 |
Most wickets
| Ajit Agarkar 8 | Azhar Mahmood 12 | Pramodya Wickramasinghe 10 |

The 1998–99 Pepsi Cup was a One Day International cricket tournament held in India in March – April 1999. It was a tri-nation series between the India, Pakistan and Sri Lanka. Pakistan defeated India in the final to win the tournament.

== Matches ==
=== 1st ODI ===
19 March 1999
Scorecard

| Pakistan; 246/9 (50 overs) | v | Sri Lanka; 237 (49.3 overs) |
| Saeed Anwar 72 (55); Pramodya Wickramasinghe 4/48 (10 overs) | | Aravinda de Silva 81 (113); Wasim Akram 3/34 (8.3 overs) |

Pakistan won by 9 runs
Keenan Stadium, Jamshedpur
Umpires: Satish Gupta (Ind) and Borni Jamula (Ind)
Player of the match: Wasim Akram (Pak)

- Pakistan won the toss and elected to bat.

=== 2nd ODI ===
22 March 1999
Scorecard

| India; 287/4 (50 overs) | v | Sri Lanka; 207 (38 overs) |
| Sourav Ganguly 130* (160); Chaminda Vaas 3/56 (10 overs) | | Arjuna Ranatunga 46 (43); Sourav Ganguly 4/21 (4 overs) |

India won by 80 runs
Vidarbha Cricket Association Ground, Nagpur
Umpires: KS Giridharan (Ind)
Player of the match: Sourav Ganguly (Ind)

- Sri Lanka won the toss and elected to field.
- Laxmi Ratan Shukla (Ind) and Hemantha Boteju (SL) made their ODI debuts.

=== 3rd ODI ===
24 March 1999
Scorecard

| Pakistan; 278/9 (50 overs) | v | India; 135 (36.1 overs) |
| Saeed Anwar 95 (117); Anil Kumble 4/53 (10 overs) | | Ajay Jadeja 61 (95); Arshad Khan 3/22 (7 overs) |

Pakistan won by 143 runs
Sawai Mansingh Stadium, Jaipur
Umpires: Sudhir Asnani (Ind) and Jasbir Singh (Ind)
Player of the match: Saeed Anwar (Pak)

- Pakistan won the toss and elected to bat.
- Gyanendra Pandey (Ind) made his ODI debut.

=== 4th ODI ===
27 March 1999
Scorecard

| Sri Lanka; 253/8 (50 overs) | v | Pakistan; 241 (46.3 overs) |
| Mahela Jayawardene 101 (138); Azhar Mahmood 4/40 (10 overs) | | Wasim Akram 79 (60); Pramodya Wickramasinghe 3/34 (9 overs) |

Sri Lanka won by 12 runs
Indira Priyadarshini Stadium, Visakhapatnam
Umpires: SK Sharma (Ind) and Ivaturi Shivram (Ind)
Player of the match: Mahela Jayawardene (SL)

- Sri Lanka won the toss and elected to bat.
- Imran Nazir (Pak) made his ODI debut.

=== 5th ODI ===
30 March 1999 (D/N)
Scorecard

| India; 286/6 (50 overs) | v | Sri Lanka; 235 (45.5 overs) |
| Ajay Jadeja 103* (102); Pramodya Wickramasinghe 2/38 (10 overs) | | Aravinda de Silva 55 (78); Ajit Agarkar 3/35 (8 overs) |

India won by 51 runs
Nehru Stadium, Pune
Umpires: Vinayak Kulkarni (Ind)
Player of the match: Ajay Jadeja (Ind)

- Sri Lanka won the toss and elected to field.
- Sadagoppan Ramesh and Amay Khurasiya (both Ind) made their ODI debuts

=== 6th ODI ===
1 April 1999 (D/N)
Scorecard

| India; 196 (49.5 overs) | v | Pakistan; 197/3 (42 overs) |
| Sourav Ganguly 57 (90); Saqlain Mushtaq 3/49 (9.5 overs) | | Ijaz Ahmed 89* (129); Venkatesh Prasad 3/27 (10 overs) |

Pakistan won by 7 wickets
Punjab Cricket Association IS Bindra Stadium, Mohali
Umpires: Shyam Bansal (Ind) and Krishna Hariharan (Ind)
Player of the match: Ijaz Ahmed (Pak)

- India won the toss and elected to bat.
- Virender Sehwag (Ind) made his ODI debut

=== Final ===
4 April 1999
Scorecard

| Pakistan; 291/8 (50 overs) | v | India; 168 (42.1 overs) |
| Inzamam-ul-Haq 91 (112); Sourav Ganguly 2/35 (7 overs) | | Ajay Jadeja 41 (62); Azhar Mahmood 5/38 (10 overs) |

Pakistan won by 123 runs
M. Chinnaswamy Stadium, Bangalore
Umpires: Srinivas Venkataraghavan (Ind)
Player of the match: Azhar Mahmood (Pak)

- Pakistan won the toss and elected to bat.
