= Pakistani cricket team in India in 1998–99 =

| | India | Pakistan |
- Dates: 23 January – 13 February 1999
| Captains | Mohammad Azharuddin | Wasim Akram |

Test series
- Result: 2-match series drawn 1–1
| Most runs | Sadagoppan Ramesh (204) | Shahid Afridi (225) |
| Most wickets | Anil Kumble (21) | Saqlain Mushtaq (20) |
- Player of the series: Saqlain Mushtaq (Pak)

The Pakistan national cricket team toured India in the 1998–99 season. The two teams played two Tests. The series was drawn 1–1. The teams were originally scheduled to play three Tests but the series was reduced to two tests, and another test was played as part of the 1998–99 Asian Test Championship.

== Background ==
The Pakistan team were to tour India after 12 years. It was reported in October 1998 that the tour would include three Tests and five One Day International (ODI) matches. The squad was scheduled to leave for India on 21 January 1999 with the opening Test starting on 3 February and the tour would wind up after the final ODI to be played on 15 March. It was later reported that the three Tests would be played in Calcutta (now Kolkata), Madras (now Chennai) and Bangalore, and the ODIs (now reduced to three) in Mohali, Cuttack and Kanpur.

However, threat of disruption by certain militant groups in response to the alleged Pakistani involvement in insurgency in Jammu and Kashmir meant the tour lay in jeopardy. Security for the touring party was assured by India's Prime Minister. In January 1999, headquarters of the Board of Control for Cricket in India was vandalized and activists of the Shiv Sena party dug up the wicket at the first Test venue in New Delhi, causing the match to be moved to the southern city of Madras (now Chennai). Some activists also protested at the Pakistani High Commission in New Delhi against the tour. However, the Pakistan squad arrived in New Delhi on 21 January after threats were withdrawn and India's Home Minister holding an emergency meeting. The number of Tests were reduced to two in the series, and another test to be played as part of the 1998–99 Asian Test Championship, and the ODI series cancelled. Pakistan came to India on the back of a better Test record against India — seven wins against four losses in 44 matches.

== Squads ==
| India | Pakistan |
|---|---|
| Mohammad Azharuddin (c); Rahul Dravid; Sourav Ganguly; Sunil Joshi; Hrishikesh Kanitkar; Anil Kumble; VVS Laxman; Nayan Mongia (wk); Venkatesh Prasad; Sadagoppan Ramesh; Laxmi Ratan Shukla; Harbhajan Singh; Javagal Srinath; Sachin Tendulkar | Wasim Akram (c); Moin Khan (vc); Shahid Afridi; Ijaz Ahmed; Mushtaq Ahmed; Shoaib Akhtar; Saeed Anwar; Naved Ashraf; Nadeem Khan; Azhar Mahmood; Saleem Malik; Saqlain Mushtaq; Inzamam-ul-Haq; Wajahatullah Wasti; Waqar Younis; Mohammad Yousuf |

The Pakistan squad for the tour was named on 14 January 1999. The 16-member squad excluded Aamer Sohail with the uncapped Wajahatullah Wasti added as his replacement. Two weeks prior, Wasim Akram had been appointed captain and Moin Khan his deputy. A 14-member India squad was named on 21 January. Two players from the squad that toured New Zealand, batsmen Navjot Singh Sidhu and Ajay Jadeja were dropped. All-rounder Laxmi Ratan Shukla and opening bat Sadagoppan Ramesh were included. Fast bowler Ajit Agarkar, nursing an injury, was left out for the first Test.

== Tour matches ==
=== Three-day: India A v Pakistan ===
23–25 January 1999
Scorecard

| Pakistan | v | India A |
| 334/6d (70.5 overs); Mohammad Yousuf 124 (156); Dodda Ganesh 2/67 (17.5 overs) | | 276 (60.3 overs); Jacob Martin 72 (108); Wasim Akram 5/55 (12.3 overs) |
| 272 (84 overs); Saleem Malik 122 (225); Laxmi Ratan Shukla 4/38 (19 overs) | | 111/5 (30 overs); Sadagoppan Ramesh 56 (78); Saqlain Mushtaq 1/8 (4 overs) |

Match drawn
Captain Roop Singh Stadium, Gwalior
Umpires: K. S. Giridharan and Manjit Singh Mahal

- Pakistan won the toss and elected to bat.

=== Three-day: Board President's XI v Pakistan ===
11–13 February 1999
Scorecard

| Pakistan | v | Board President's XI |
| 247/9d (78.4 overs); Moin Khan 67 (76); Laxmi Ratan Shukla 3/55 (12 overs) | | 282 (83.5 overs); Virender Sehwag 66 (83); Nadeem Khan 4/87 (28 overs) |
| 295/7d (91 overs); Saeed Anwar 99 (155); K. N. Ananthapadmanabhan 5/80 (23 overs) | | 22/2 (10 overs); Mohammad Kaif 8* (12); Shoaib Akhtar 2/17 (5 overs) |

Match drawn
Jawaharlal Nehru Stadium, Kochi
Umpires: G. A. Pratapkumar and Shavir Tarapore

- Pakistan won the toss and elected to bat.

== Test series ==
=== 1st Test ===
28–31 January 1999
Scorecard

| Pakistan | v | India |
| 238 (79.5 overs); Moin Khan 60 (117); Anil Kumble 6/70 (24.5 overs) | | 254 (81.1 overs); Sourav Ganguly 54 (138); Saqlain Mushtaq 5/94 (35 overs) |
| 286 (71.2 overs); Shahid Afridi 141 (191); Venkatesh Prasad 6/33 (10.2 overs) | | 258 (95.2 overs); Sachin Tendulkar 136 (273); Saqlain Mushtaq 5/93 (32.2 overs) |

Pakistan won by 12 runs
MA Chidambaram Stadium, Chepauk, Chennai
Umpires: Steve Dunne (NZ) and V. K. Ramaswamy (Ind)
Player of the match: Sachin Tendulkar (Ind)

- Pakistan won the toss and elected to bat.
- Sadagoppan Ramesh (Ind) made his Test debut.

=== 2nd Test ===
4–7 February 1999
Scorecard

| India | v | Pakistan |
| 252 (91.5 overs); Mohammad Azharuddin 67 (134); Saqlain Mushtaq 5/94 (35.5 overs) | | 172 (64.3 overs); Shahid Afridi 32 (53); Anil Kumble 4/75 (24.3 overs) |
| 339 (113.4 overs); Sadagoppan Ramesh 96 (227); Saqlain Mushtaq 5/122 (46.4 overs) | | 207 (60.3 overs); Saeed Anwar 69 (128); Anil Kumble 10/74 (26.3 overs) |

India won by 212 runs
Feroz Shah Kotla, Delhi
Umpires: Steve Bucknor (WI) and Arani Jayaprakash (Ind)
Player of the match: Anil Kumble (Ind)

- India won the toss and elected to bat.
- Anil Kumble (Ind) became the second bowler to take all 10 wickets in a Test match innings, after Jim Laker (Eng).
