= India national cricket team selectors =

India national cricket teams selectors

Indian national cricket selectors are a committee of cricket administrators, usually composed of former cricket players and is appointed by the Board of Control for Cricket in India. Their responsibility is to select members of cricket teams to represent India at various levels. The term for selectors was increased from one year to two years in 2006, with a provision for an additional year based on performance. The selectors are appointed by the BCCI's three-member Cricket Advisory Committee, which currently includes Ashok Malhotra, Jatin Paranjpe, and Sulakshana Naik.

== History ==
Until 18 November 2022, Chetan Sharma served as a chief selector, and some members were: Debashish Mohanty, Harvinder Singh and Sunil Joshi. This panel was shut down after an unsuccessful tour of the Indian men's team in the 2022 T20 world cup. On 4 July 2023, Ajit Agarkar was appointed as the Chairman of the Senior Men's Selection Committee. The current five-man selection committee, headed by Agarkar, consists of Shiv Sundar Das, Ajay Ratra, R. P. Singh and Pragyan Ojha.

== Selection committees ==
There are two selection committees :

=== Senior selection committee ===
This panel selects players for the senior Indian team. It comprises five members from five zones of India: Central, North, West, South, and East.

- International matches: Test Matches, ODI Matches and T20I Matches
- India 'A' teams: both for home and away series
- President's XI/BCCI XI to play visiting international teams

==== Present men's selection committee ====
- Shiv Sunder Das
- Ajay Ratra
- R. P. Singh
- Pragyan Ojha (chairman)
- Ramesh Powar

==== All India women's selection committee ====
This committee selects players for the Indian women's cricket team. This committee comprises only women who have represented India at an international level. Similar to the men's selection committee, its members are appointed from five zones of the nation. The following are the present members of this committee:

- Amita Sharma (chief selector)
- Shyama Dey
- Jaya Sharma
- Sulakshana Naik
- Sravanthi Naidu

=== Junior selection committee ===
The 5 members committee for Junior players is as follows:

1. Thilak Naidu (South Zone) - Chairman

2. Pathik Patel (West Zone)

3. Ranadeb Bose (East Zone)

4. Kishan Mohan (North Zone)

5. Harvinder Singh Sodhi (Central Zone)

== Chief selectors of the Indian men's national cricket team ==
This section lists individuals who have served as Chairmen (Chief Selectors) of the BCCI's Senior Men's National Selection Committee.

Name	Term
Syed Kirmani	2002–2004
Kiran More	2004–2006
Dilip Vengsarkar	2006–2008
Kris Srikkanth	2008–2012
Sandeep Patil	2012–2016
M. S. K. Prasad	2016–2020
Chetan Sharma	2020–2023
Ajit Agarkar	2023-2026
Pragyan Ojha	2026-present

== Composition ==
The selection committee consists of five members and a convenor. The five members of the selection committee, captain and coach have voting rights on team selection. The convenor of the senior selection team is the incumbent Sr. Secretary, the BCCI, and that of the junior selection team is the Jr. Secretary.

The five members of the selection committee were traditionally selected from the five cricket zones: North Zone, Central Zone, West Zone, East Zone and South Zone. One of the five members is chosen by the BCCI as the chairman of the committee. The BCCI scrapped the zonal system in 2016 under pressure from the Lodha committee recommendation.

The Captain and Coach are invited to the selection committee meetings to present their opinions on team players. Moreover, they have voting rights in team selection.

== Controversies ==
Issues with the composition of the Selection Committee based on the Zonal system

- The biggest criticism of the traditional zonal system based on the five-member selection committee is the interest served by the committee members. The popular opinion is that the selectors constantly promote the interests of players from their zone or vote on players based on cross-promotion from other zones instead of selecting the best available team. The BCCI tried addressing the issue in 2006 as part of its Shashank Manohar-led constitution review committee. However, the zonal heads' lack of consensus and concerns scuttled all the efforts to reduce the five-member committee to a three- or four-member national committee.
  - In August 1998, the Rules Revision Committee composed of Satwinder Vishu (Special Invitee), Raj Singh Dungarpur, Lele, Satwinder Singh (Vishu), S K Nair, N Subba Rao, Ratnakar Shetty, Bibhuti Das and Ranbir Singh recommended a comprehensive reconstitution of the national selection committee. The Selection Committee consists of three members who have played at least 20 tests or 50 Ranji Trophy each. In addition, the selectors would be paid instead of being asked to take an honorary position, and would be aided by a five-member talent spotter team (one from each zone). Unfortunately, the recommendations of this committee report were never implemented, and the reasons remain unknown.
  - After the 2007 Cricket World Cup debacle, where India was eliminated in the first round, the BCCI scrapped the zonal selection system and is looking to replace the five-man selection committee. The details of the new structure are still awaited. Several players including the former chairman of the selection committee Kiran More have welcomed the BCCI's decision. The proposed changes have fallen through since then.
- In his book John Wright's Indian Summers, John Wright, Indian National Coach (2000–2005), championed the need to have professionally paid selectors rather than have individuals play the role on an honorary basis. John Wright felt that professionally paid selectors could be held accountable for their actions. In the book, John Wright disclosed that he felt frustrated at certain decisions made by the selectors at various points during his coaching career.
  - After the 2007 Cricket World Cup debacle, where India was eliminated in the first round, the BCCI decided to scrap the honorary system for selectors and have paid selectors.
- Cricket coaches and ex-cricketers have debated the merits and demerits of the coach having a vote in the selection committee. Kapil Dev wanted voting rights when he took over as national coach. However, the BCCI never gave any coach voting rights in the selection process during his tenure. At present, the captain and coach have voting rights in team selection.

=== Lodha Committee recommendations and subsequent changes ===
- The Lodha Committee provided recommendations that the Supreme Court of India ordered the BCCI to implement. One recommendation was to scrap the zonal system and appoint three national selectors who would all be test players retired for a minimum of five years. Thus, the BCCI was compelled to finally scrap the zonal system in September 2016. They advertised for applications and used personal interviews to pick the selectors. However, the BCCI differed from the recommendation in picking five selectors and in the eligibility criteria (allowing for ODI and first-class experience).
- The former commentator, coach, cricketer and captain Ravi Shastri criticized some of Lodha Committee's recommendations, arguing for five selectors.

==== Questions raised on selectors ====
The national selectors often get slammed by many due to its irregular and unintelligible selection criteria and its process. Selectors expected to selects players by considering their performance in domestic cricket's top tournaments such Ranji, Vijay Hazare Trophy to choose players for Test and ODI teams respectively. But often its alleged that they select players by considering their performance in IPL and ignore consistent performance in domestic cricket's. Many including Sunil Gavaskar, Abhinav Mukund has slammed them (selectors- BCCI) for doing this. National selectors often select players for Test, ODI teams by considering players performance in T20 format (IPL specifically) instead considering Ranji trophy (First class) and Vijay Hazare trophy (One day format) national tournaments.

== Finance ==
In August 2018, the Committee of Administrators increased the salary of the national selectors in a meeting. In the meeting, it was decided that the remuneration of the members of the selection committee would be increased to INR 90 lakhs (US$110,000) (from INR 60 lakhs) per annum, while the chairman of the panel would now receive INR 1 crore (US$130,000) (from INR 80 lakhs) per annum.

Meanwhile, the remuneration of the members of the junior selection committee has been increased to INR 60 lakhs (US$75,000) per annum, with the chairman of the panel now receiving INR 65 lakhs (US$81,000) per annum.

The salaries of the women's selection committee have also been increased, with the members now receiving INR 25 lakhs (US$31,000) per annum and the chief selector set to accept INR 30 lakhs (US$38,000) per annum.

== See also ==
- Sport in India
- Cricket in India
