= Deep Dasgupta =

Indian cricketer (born 1977)

Personal information
- Full name: Deep Biplab Dasgupta
- Born: 7 June 1977 (age 49); Calcutta, West Bengal, India
- Batting: Right-handed
- Role: Wicket-keeper-batsman

International information
- National side: India (2001–2002)
- Test debut (cap 238): 3 November 2001 v South Africa
- Last Test: 11 April 2002 v West Indies
- ODI debut (cap 139): 5 October 2001 v South Africa
- Last ODI: 19 October 2001 v South Africa

Domestic team information
- Years: Team
- 1998/99–2009/10: Bengal

Career statistics
Competition	Test	ODI	FC	LA
Matches	8	5	83	53
Runs scored	344	51	3,806	776
Batting average	28.67	17.00	30.20	22.82
100s/50s	1/2	0/0	6/21	0/3
Top score	100	24*	171	65
Catches/stumpings	13/0	2/1	190/22	46/10
- Source: ESPNcricinfo, 19 May 2022

Deep Dasgupta (born 7 June 1977) is a former Indian cricketer who played in eight Test matches and five One Day Internationals between 2001 and 2006 as the national wicketkeeper and was later replaced by Ajay Ratra. He is now a Hindi and English commentator.

He later joined the Indian Cricket League, where he played for the Royal Bengal Tigers. Nowadays he is a commentator.

== Early life ==
Although born in Kolkata and Bengali by birth, Dasgupta grew up in Delhi.

== Education ==
Dasgupta studied at the Sardar Patel Vidyalaya, New Delhi.

== Cricket career ==
Dasgupta started his career as an opening batsman-wicketkeeper. His ability behind the stumps and on the crease placed him to become a reliable member of the Bengal Ranji Squad.

Dasgupta was included in India's squad to South Africa in 2001. His debut series was an eventful one, in which the famous incident involving match referee Mike Denness took place. Dasgupta was one of the six cricketers along with Sachin Tendulkar, Virender Sehwag, Saurav Ganguly, Harbhajan Singh, and Shiv Sunder Das to be banned by Denness for one Test. While Tendulkar was banned for ball-tampering, Ganguly, the captain, was banned for his 'inability to control the behavior of his team'. The rest, including Dasgupta, were suspended for excessive appealing.

Dasgupta scored a century against England at Mohali in the first Test of the 2001-02 series.

Later he continued with Bengal in the Ranji trophy. Deep Dasgupta has been one of the most successful captains the Bengal Ranji team has ever had. He is only the second captain after Sambaran Banerjee to lead the team to two Ranji Trophy finals in consecutive seasons (06–07). Both times they lost to Uttar Pradesh and Mumbai respectively.

== Cricket commentary ==
Dasgupta is currently a commentator in India and can be seen doing that very often during the Indian Premier League and was also the part of commentary team during the ICC World T20 2016 in India.

== Personal life ==
After a courtship of three years, Dasgupta married Amrita.
