= Sadagoppan Ramesh =

Indian cricket player

Personal information
- Born: 13 October 1975 (age 51); Madras (now Chennai), Tamil Nadu, India
- Batting: Left-handed
- Bowling: Right-arm off-break
- Role: Batsman

International information
- National side: India (1999–2001)
- Test debut (cap 219): 28 January 1999 v Pakistan
- Last Test: 2 September 2001 v Sri Lanka
- ODI debut (cap 122): 30 March 1999 v Sri Lanka
- Last ODI: 3 October 1999 v South Africa
- ODI shirt no.: 4

Domestic team information
- Years: Team
- 1996–2005: Tamil Nadu
- 2005-2007: Kerala
- 2007-2008: Assam

Career statistics
Competition	Test	ODI	FC	LA
Matches	19	24	116	82
Runs scored	1367	645	7,696	2,475
Batting average	37.97	28.08	43.23	32.56
100s/50s	2/8	0/6	20/38	2/18
Top score	143	82	187	105
Balls bowled	5	36	467	127
Wickets	0	1	3	10
Bowling average	–	38.00	94.66	10.10
5 wickets in innings	–	0	0	0
10 wickets in match	–	0	0	0
Best bowling	–	1/23	1/22	5/31
Catches/stumpings	18/–	3/–	85/–	24/–
- Source: CricInfo, 1 November 2023

Sadagoppan Ramesh (born 13 October 1975) is a former Indian international cricketer. He is a left-handed opening batter and an occasional right-arm off break bowler. He had represented the Indian cricket team while also representing Tamil Nadu and South zone in domestic cricket. In September 1999, he became the first Indian cricketer to take a wicket off his first ball in ODI cricket. He later became an actor post his cricketing career appearing in Tamil films.

== Early life and family ==
Ramesh was born on 13 October 1975 in Madras, Tamil Nadu to P.C. Sadagoppan. He finished his college at Guru Nanak College in Chennai. Ramesh is married to Aparna and they have a daughter.

== Career ==
=== International ===
Ramesh made his test debut for India against Pakistan in the first test at his home ground at Chennai during the Pakistan tour of India in 1999. Ramesh was the highest scorer with 323 runs in three matches in his debut series. Ramesh subsequently scored his first century against Sri Lanka in the second test of the 1998–99 Asian Test Championship at Colombo in February 1999. Ramesh made his ODI debut in March 1999 in the Pepsi Cup match against Sri Lanka scoring 24 in an Indian victory. Subsequently, Ramesh was named in the Indian squad for the 1999 Cricket World Cup. Ramesh scored 144 runs in five matches at the world cup.

On 5 September 1999, Ramesh took a wicket of the first ball he bowled in ODI cricket in a match against West Indies in the Coca-Cola challenge at Singapore becoming the first Indian to take a wicket off his first ball. Ramesh played in the subsequent series against West Indies in Toronto, Canada where he scored 57 runs across three matches. Ramesh played his final series in the LG Cup against South Africa and Kenya at Nairobi with his final match coming in the final of the series on 3 October 1999. Overall, he scored 646 runs in 24 matches at an average of 28.08.

Ramesh played in the home series against New Zealand in October 1999. He scored 287 runs with his second and last century also coming in the third test of the series at Ahmedabad. Ramesh played two tests against Australia in the Border-Gavaskar trophy in Australia December 1999, scoring 60 runs. He also played the return leg of the Border-Gavaskar trophy in February–March 2001. He played all three matches in the series, scoring 162 runs with the highest score of 61 in the final test in Chennai leading to a memorable series victory for India. Ramesh's final series came in the Indian tour of Sri Lanka in 2001. He played his final test in September 2001 at Colombo finishing off with a score of 55 runs in the final innings. He played 19 tests overall scoring 1467 runs at an average of 37.97 with two centuries.

=== Domestic ===
He made his debut for Tamil Nadu in the 1995–96 season and played domestic cricket for them for ten seasons. He opened the innings for the team and scored more than seven thousand runs in first class cricket at an average of over 43. Ramesh was part of the team that reached the finals of Ranji Trophy two consecutive seasons in 2002-03 and 2003-04. He also represented Kerala during 2005–06, 2006–07 seasons and Assam in the 2007–08 season.

== Post-retirement ==
Ramesh has acted in the Tamil movies Santosh Subramaniam (2008), Potta Potti (2012), and Madha Gaja Raja (2025).

In 2019, Ramesh invested in 'Swaraas', a multipurpose karaoke studio. He is also an active commentator in Star Sports Tamil.
