= Wisden 100 =

The Wisden 100 is a set of lists created by Wisden which attempted to objectively rate the 100 best individual innings performances in Test and One Day International cricket in each of the disciplines of batting and bowling. The Test list was released in 2001 and the ODI list was released in 2002.

The ratings were calculated by scoring each individual batting and bowling performance in various criteria. Apart from the player's actual score or figures, criteria which were taken into account included the strength of the opposition players, the quality of the pitch, the result of the match, and the player's contribution to this result. The maximum possible rating was 300.

Overall in both formats, 13 innings of Vivian Richards were selected by Wisden more than anyone in the list.

== Test cricket ==
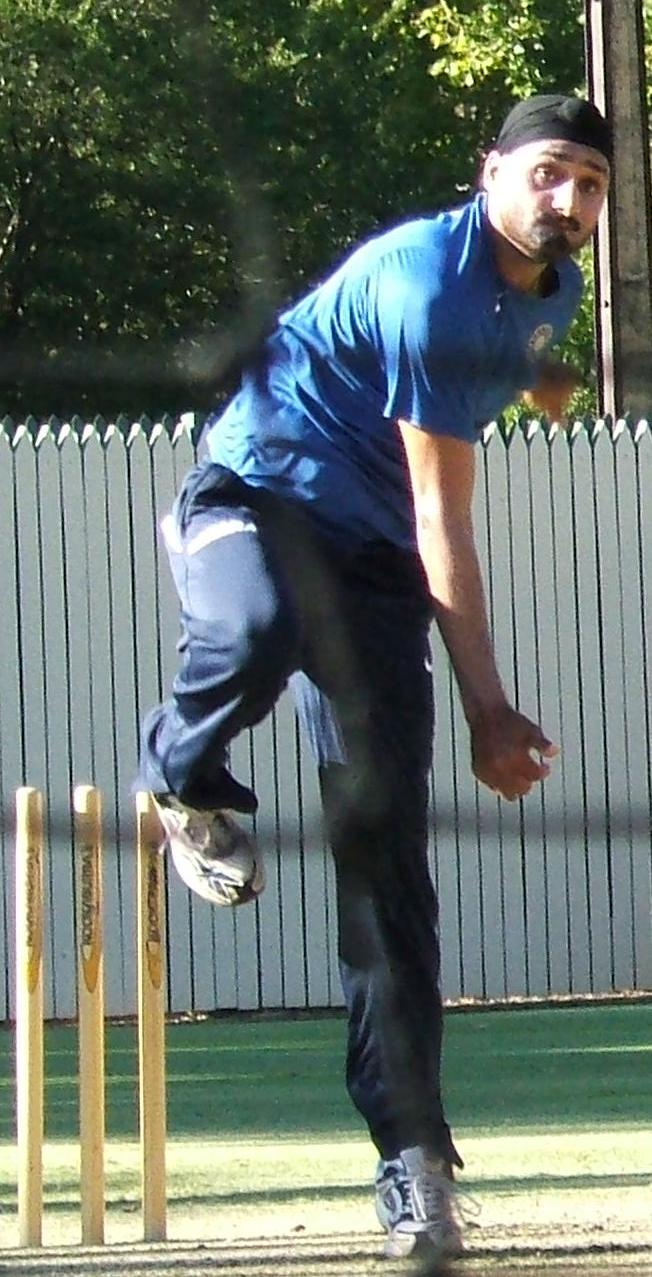
Harbhajan, pictured here bowling in the nets, was one of only two players to have four bowling performances in the top 100.

The Wisden 100 list for Test cricket was released on 26 July 2001.

The top-rated batting performance was Donald Bradman's 270 for Australia against England at Melbourne in the 1936–37 Ashes series. 5 of Bradman's innings appeared in the top 100, more than any other batsman.

The top-rated bowling performance was Hugh Tayfield's 9/113 for South Africa against England at Johannesburg in the 1956–57 series. Curtly Ambrose and Harbhajan Singh each had 4 performances in the top 100, more than any other bowler.

=== Top 10 Batting performances ===
Rank	Batsman	Score	For	Against	Venue	Season	Rating
1	Donald Bradman	270	Australia	England	Melbourne	1936–37	262.4
2	Brian Lara	153*	West Indies	Australia	Bridgetown	1998–99	255.2
3	Graham Gooch	154*	England	West Indies	Leeds	1991	252.0
4	Ian Botham	149*	England	Australia	Leeds	1981	240.8
5	Donald Bradman	299*	Australia	South Africa	Adelaide	1931–32	236.8
6	V. V. S. Laxman	281	India	Australia	Kolkata	2000–01	234.8
7	Clem Hill	188	Australia	England	Melbourne	1897–98	234.2
8	Azhar Mahmood	132	Pakistan	South Africa	Durban	1997–98	232.6
9	Kim Hughes	100*	Australia	West Indies	Melbourne	1981–82	229.7
10	Brian Lara	375	West Indies	England	St. John's	1993–94	228.1

For the full list, see Top 100 Batsmen (Test) at Rediff.com.

=== Top 10 Bowling performances ===
Rank	Bowler	Figures	For	Against	Venue	Season	Rating
1	Hugh Tayfield	9/113	South Africa	England	Johannesburg	1956–57	253.9
2	Anil Kumble	10/74	India	Pakistan	Delhi	1998–99	248.6
3	Jim Laker	10/53	England	Australia	Manchester	1956	241.7
4	Jack White	8/126	England	Australia	Adelaide	1928–29	238.8
5	Richard Hadlee	9/52	New Zealand	Australia	Brisbane	1985–86	237.1
6	Devon Malcolm	9/57	England	South Africa	The Oval, London	1994	234.4
7	Bob Willis	8/43	England	Australia	Leeds	1981	226.1
8	Hedley Verity	8/43	England	Australia	Lord's, London	1934	225.1
9	Bill O'Reilly	7/54	Australia	England	Trent Bridge	1934	224.3
10	Graham McKenzie	8/71	Australia	West Indies	Melbourne	1968–69	224.1

For the full list, see Top 100 Bowlers (Test) at Rediff.com.

=== Controversy ===
Despite his highly impressive career record, not one of Sachin Tendulkar's innings appeared in the top 100 batting performances. His omission was strongly criticised by fans and many sections of the media in India. Wisden defended the list stating that performances which made a major contribution to victory received a much larger weighting than those in which the match was drawn or lost. Tendulkar's most important innings had usually come in draws and defeats, and therefore received a lower weighting.

The list also received general criticism from a few leading sports editors.

=== Updating the list ===
The list has had no official updated release since its inception. However, shortly after the list's release, Wisden stated that Mark Butcher's match-winning innings of 173* in the 4th Test of the 2001 Ashes series placed him in 48th place on the batting list with a rating of 200.8.

== ODI cricket ==
Following the success of the list for Test cricket, the Wisden 100 list for ODI cricket was released on 1 February 2002.

The top-rated batting performance was Viv Richards' 189* for West Indies against England at Manchester in 1984. 7 of Richards' innings appeared in the top 100, more than any other batsman.

The top-rated bowling performance was Gary Gilmour's 6/14 for Australia against England at Leeds in 1975. Waqar Younis appears 9 times in the top 100, more than any other player.

=== Top 10 Batting performances ===
Rank	Batsman	Score	For	Against	Venue	Year	Rating
1	Viv Richards	189*	West Indies	England	Old Trafford	1984	257.59
2	Viv Richards	138*	West Indies	England	Lord's, London	1979	245.76
3	Sanath Jayasuriya	189	Sri Lanka	India	Sharjah	2000	245.33
4	Kapil Dev	175*	India	Zimbabwe	Tunbridge Wells	1983	241.87
5	Saeed Anwar	194	Pakistan	India	Chennai	1997	225.62
6	David Gower	158	England	New Zealand	Brisbane	1983	219.84
7	Brian Lara	169	West Indies	Sri Lanka	Sharjah	1995	215.21
8	Aravinda de Silva	107*	Sri Lanka	Australia	Lahore	1996	212.91
9	Clive Lloyd	102	West Indies	Australia	Lord's, London	1975	209.84
10	Brian Lara	153	West Indies	Pakistan	Sharjah	1993	204.46

For the full list, see Top 100 Batsmen (ODI) at Rediff.com.

=== Top 10 Bowling performances ===
Rank	Bowler	Figures	For	Against	Venue	Year	Rating
1	Gary Gilmour	6/14	Australia	England	Leeds	1975	205.56
2	Aaqib Javed	7/37	Pakistan	India	Sharjah	1991	202.25
3	Waqar Younis	7/36	Pakistan	England	Leeds	2001	181.34
4	Chaminda Vaas	8/19	Sri Lanka	Zimbabwe	Colombo	2001	174.94
5	Chaminda Vaas	5/14	Sri Lanka	India	Sharjah	2000	173.93
6	Joel Garner	5/38	West Indies	England	Lord's, London	1979	172.78
7	Sunil Joshi	5/6	India	South Africa	Nairobi	1999	170.66
8	Shaun Pollock	5/36	South Africa	Australia	Birmingham	1999	161.99
9	Muttiah Muralitharan	7/30	Sri Lanka	India	Sharjah	2000	160.02
10	Madan Lal	3/31	India	West Indies	Lord's, London	1983	158.50

For the full list, see Top 100 Bowlers (ODI) at Rediff.com.

=== Updating the list ===
As with the Test cricket list, this list has had no official updated release since its inception. However, Wisden stated that Ricky Ponting's 140* against India in the 2003 World Cup final placed him 2nd on the batting list.

== All-time lists ==
Following the launch of the top Test and ODI performances lists, Wisden received many requests asking whether it was possible to create a ranking list of all-time great players by using the same formula and examining the average rating each player received per innings. Including a weighting for players with longer careers, Wisden arrived at the lists below. In Tests, Donald Bradman was the clear leader in the batting category and Muttiah Muralitharan was ranked as the top bowler. In the ODI section, Viv Richards and Wasim Akram are the top-ranked players.

=== Top 5 Test batsmen ===
Rank	Batsman	Rating
1	(Australia) Donald Bradman	1349.0
2	(India) Sachin Tendulkar	1000.5
3	(Cricket West Indies) Viv Richards	913.9
4	(Cricket West Indies) Garfield Sobers	912.0
5	(Australia) Allan Border	911.2

=== Top 5 Test bowlers ===
Rank	Bowler	Rating
1	(Sri Lanka) Muttiah Muralitharan	1320.4
2	(New Zealand) Richard Hadlee	1232.9
3	(England) Sydney Barnes	1209.3
4	(Australia) Shane Warne	1195.8
5	(Australia) Clarrie Grimmett	1184.8

For the full Top 10 list for Test cricket, see All-time W100 Test Top 10s at Cricinfo.com.

=== Top 5 ODI batsmen ===
Rank	Batsman	Rating
1	(Cricket West Indies) Viv Richards	1132.5
2	(India) Sachin Tendulkar	1119.3
3	(Australia) Michael Bevan	1036.8
4	(Australia) Ricky Ponting	1022.1
5	(Cricket West Indies) Brian Lara	1016.7

=== Top 5 ODI bowlers ===
Rank	Bowler	Rating
1	(Pakistan) Wasim Akram	1223.5
2	(South Africa) Allan Donald	1180.1
3	(Pakistan) Waqar Younis	1167.1
4	(Australia) Glenn McGrath	1165.9
5	(Cricket West Indies) Joel Garner	1160.7

For the full Top 10 list for ODI cricket, see All-time W100 ODI Top 10s at Cricinfo.com.

== Other lists ==
The same methodology was used to rank each player's overall performance in the 2003 Cricket World Cup. In this list, the top batsman was Sachin Tendulkar and the top bowler was Glenn McGrath.
