= Vinayak Kulkarni =

Indian cricket umpire (born 1954)

Personal information
- Born: 11 September 1954 (age 72); Bagalkot, India

Umpiring information
- ODIs umpired: 2 (1999–2000)
- Source: Cricinfo, 25 May 2014

Vinayak N. Kulkarni (born 11 September 1954) is a former Indian cricket umpire. At the international level, he only stood in two ODI games in 1999 and 2000. Later, he became an umpire's coach for the Board of Control for Cricket in India (BCCI).

== See also ==
- List of One Day International cricket umpires
