= Iqbal Siddiqui =

Indian cricketer (born 1974)

Cricket information
- Batting: Right-handed
- Bowling: Right-arm medium-fast

International information
- National side: India (2001)
- Only Test: 3 December 2001 v England

Career statistics
Competition	Test	FC	LA
Matches	1	90	59
Runs scored	29	1,343	385
Batting average	29.00	14.13	12.41
100s/50s	0/0	1/3	0/0
Top score	24	116	44*
Balls bowled	114	18,957	2,835
Wickets	1	315	80
Bowling average	48.00	30.08	29.33
5 wickets in innings	0	19	2
10 wickets in match	0	3	0
Best bowling	1/32	8/72	5/41
Catches/stumpings	1/–	34/–	5/–
- Source: ESPNcricinfo, 30 August 2022

Iqbal Siddiqui (born 26 December 1974) is a former Indian cricketer. He is a right-handed batsman and a right-arm medium-fast bowler. He made his debut for Maharashtra in the 1992-93 Ranji Trophy. Siddiqui's frame generates a considerable amount of pace. In spite of his low first-class batting average, he has once scored a first class century.

He played one Test in 2001, against England in the first Test in Mohali. England had gained a meager 5-run lead at the start of India's second innings. Captain Saurav Ganguly sent Siddiqui in to bat, even though his regular position was in the tail. He hit the winning runs in his only Test match to date, a record he shares with Australia's Jeff Moss.

Despite having played only one Test, Iqbal Siddiqui is the only Indian other than Manoj Prabhakar till date to open both the bowling and batting on debut, in Test matches.

In the 2006 cricket season he played for Sevenoaks Vine in the Kent cricket league.

== See also ==
- One Test Wonder
