= Sarandeep Singh =

Indian cricketer (born 1979)

Personal information
- Born: 21 October 1979 (age 47); Amritsar, Punjab, India
- Batting: Right-handed
- Bowling: Right-arm offbreak
- Role: Bowler

Career statistics
Competition	Test	ODI
Matches	3	5
Runs scored	43	47
Batting average	43.00	15.66
100s/50s	0/0	0/0
Top score	39*	19
Balls bowled	678	258
Wickets	10	3
Bowling average	34.00	60.00
5 wickets in innings	0	0
10 wickets in match	0	0
Best bowling	4/136	2/34
Catches/stumpings	1/–	2/–
- Source: ESPNcricinfo, 4 February 2006

Sarandeep Singh (born 21 October 1979) is an Indian former cricketer. He is a right-handed batsman and a right-arm offbreak bowler. In his debut Test match he took six wickets in Nagpur. Singh started his career in Rani Ka Bagh Amritsar in 1998–1999, playing for Punjab and before the end of the year, he was playing for the Under-19 squad.

He was bought by Delhi Daredevils.

Singh took 37 wickets at the 1999-2000 Ranji Trophy and was selected in 2000 for the first intake of the National Cricket Academy in Bangalore.

In 2016 he was made a national selector for the Indian cricket team.
