= Ajay Ratra =

Indian cricketer (born 1981)

Personal information
- Full name: Ajay Ratra
- Born: 13 December 1981 (age 44); Faridabad, Haryana, India
- Nickname: Bunty
- Batting: Right-handed
- Bowling: Right-arm medium
- Role: Wicket-keeper

International information
- National side: India (2002)
- Test debut (cap 243): 19 April 2002 v West Indies
- Last Test: 9 September 2002 v England
- ODI debut (cap 140): 19 January 2002 v England
- Last ODI: 9 July 2002 v England

Domestic team information
- Years: Team
- 1999–2005: Haryana
- 2007–2011: Goa
- 2011–2013: Tripura

Career statistics
Competition	Test	ODI	FC	LA
Matches	6	12	99	89
Runs scored	163	90	4,029	1381
Batting average	18.11	12.85	30.29	22.63
100s/50s	1/0	0/0	8/17	1/6
Top score	115*	30	204*	103
Catches/stumpings	11/2	11/5	233/27	78/30
- Source: ESPNcricinfo, 23 July 2015

Ajay Ratra (born 13 December 1981) is a former Indian cricketer. He is a right-handed batsman and wicketkeeper. He made his ODI debut on 19 Jan 2002 against England. He is appointed by the BCCI as the National Selector of the Indian Men's Cricket team in September 2024.

Ratra was selected in 2000 for the first intake of the National Cricket Academy in Bangalore. When Ratra made an innings of 115 not out in 2002 against the West Indies, he was the youngest wicketkeeper to make a century in Tests, and first Indian wicketkeeper to make an overseas century. After he was injured in 2002, he was replaced by Parthiv Patel, the youngest ever Test wicketkeeper. Ratra then fell behind Mahendra Singh Dhoni, Dinesh Karthik and Patel in the pecking order.

Ratra was part of the Indian Under-19 squad which won the Youth World Cup in 2000, and following training sessions with the National Cricket Academy he became one of six wicketkeepers that India would attempt to integrate into the squad in the space of 12 months. He played in the Syed Mushtaq Ali Trophy for Goa.

In July 2015 Ratra announced his retirement from cricket. He played 99 first-class matches in which he scored 4029 runs at an average of 30.29 including eight hundreds and a double-century. He also played in 89 List A games in which scored 1381 runs at 22.63.

== Career best performances ==
Updated 15 October 2010

	Batting			
	Score	Fixture	Venue	Season
Tests	115*	India v West Indies	St. John's	2002
ODI	30	India v England	Cuttack	2002
FC	170*	Goa v Jharkhand	Dhanbad	2009
LA	103	Goa v Karnataka	Chennai (GNC)	2007
T20	13	Goa v Karnataka	Hyderabad	2010
