= M. S. Mahal =

Indian cricket umpire (born 1951)

Personal information
- Born: 15 February 1951 (age 75)

Umpiring information
- ODIs umpired: 1 (2002)
- WODIs umpired: 1 (1997)
- Source: ESPNcricinfo, 25 May 2014

M. S. Mahal (born 15 February 1951) is a former Indian cricket umpire. Mahal mainly officiated in first-class cricket matches in India. He stood in one ODI game in 2002.

== See also ==
- List of One Day International cricket umpires
