= S. K. Sharma =

Indian cricket umpire (1952–2015)

Personal information
- Full name: Surinder Kumar Sharma
- Born: 10 June 1952; Delhi, India
- Died: 17 April 2015 (aged 62); Mumbai, India

Umpiring information
- ODIs umpired: 10 (1993–2002)
- WODIs umpired: 1 (1997)
- Source: Cricinfo, 30 May 2014

S. K. Sharma (10 June 1952 – 17 April 2015) was an Indian cricket umpire. He stood in ten ODI games from 1993 to 2002.

== See also ==
- List of One Day International cricket umpires
