= Shiv Sunder Das =

Indian cricketer and coach (born 1977)

Personal information
- Born: 5 November 1977 (age 49); Bhubaneswar, Odisha, India
- Batting: Right-handed
- Bowling: Right-arm medium
- Role: Batsman

International information
- National side: India (2000–2002)
- Test debut (cap 229): 10 November 2000 v Bangladesh
- Last Test: 18 May 2002 v West Indies
- ODI debut (cap 138): 5 October 2001 v South Africa
- Last ODI: 26 December 2002 v New Zealand

Domestic team information
- Years: Team
- 1993/94–2010/11: Odisha
- 2011/12–2012/13: Vidarbha

Career statistics
Competition	Test	ODI	FC	LA
Matches	23	4	180	81
Runs scored	1,326	39	10,908	2,421
Batting average	34.89	13.00	38.68	32.71
100s/50s	2/9	0/0	24/52	4/13
Top score	110	30	300*	133*
Balls bowled	66	–	382	190
Wickets	0	–	4	0
Bowling average	–	–	48.50	–
5 wickets in innings	–	–	0	–
10 wickets in match	–	–	0	–
Best bowling	–	–	1/0	–
Catches/stumpings	34/–	0/–	159/–	22/–
- Source: Cricinfo, 23 January 2019

Shiv Sunder Das (born 5 November 1977) is an Indian cricket coach and former cricketer. He is currently part of the senior men's national cricket team Selection Committee. He is the third player from Odisha to represent India. He is a right-handed opening batsman. In first-class cricket he played for Odisha. Das was selected in 2000 for the first intake of the National Cricket Academy in Bangalore. He proceeded to make his Test debut later that year.

== International career ==
Considered the answer to India's search for a genuine Test opener, Das was selected for the 2002 tour of West Indies but after failing to score a fifty during the tour, he was dropped from the Test XI in the subsequent tour of England, and has not played for India since. Das represented India in 23 Test matches and scored 1,326 runs at an average of 34.89, hitting two centuries – both of them against Zimbabwe. He was awarded the Man of the Series award during this tour to Zimbabwe, in 2001. Das then hit 250 in a first-class match against Essex during India's tour to England in 2002. In first class cricket, Das now retired in domestic competitions and currently batting coach of India national women cricket team

== Coaching career ==
Back in 2016, he was training the boys in the U-16 & U-19 camp in Dimapur and Shillong Before taking coach role for a senior side. Das was appointed as the coach of the Odisha cricket team by the Odisha Cricket Association in 2017.He replaced the former India cricketer Debasish Mohanty as the coach. In August 2018, he was appointed as the coach of Manipur cricket team. He was ruled out as National Selector due to the 'Retirement date' criteria because his retirement from all formats was not completed 5 years. In 2021, he was named as the batting coach of the Indian women's team till 2023 when he was replaced by Amol Muzumdar.
