= List of international cricket centuries by Rahul Dravid =

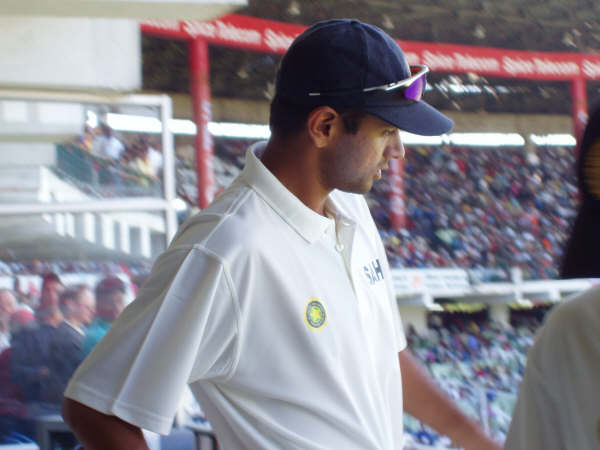
Rahul Dravid during the Australian tour of India in 2004

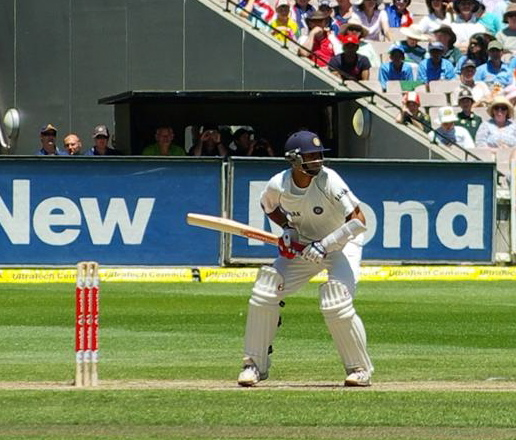
Dravid at the crease in 2007

Rahul Dravid is a retired Indian international cricketer. in both Test and One Day International (ODI) cricket in matches organised by the International Cricket Council (ICC). Nicknamed "The Wall" for his ability of "... fending off the fiercest, the fastest and the wiliest of bowlers around the world", he scored 36 centuries (scores of 100 runs or more) in Test cricket and 12 in One Day Internationals (ODI) between his debut in 1996 and retirement in 2011. He was named as one of the five Wisden Cricketers of the Year in 2000, as well as the ICC Test Player of the Year and ICC Player of the Year in 2004. After retiring from international cricket, Dravid took on key developmental roles in Indian cricket, including serving as the head of the National Cricket Academy and coaching India's Under-19 and A teams.

Dravid scored his first Test century in January 1997 against South Africa. In a man-of-the-match performance, he made 148 runs spanning nine hours and took India to their only draw of the series. He made centuries in both innings of a match when he scored 190 and 103 not out in the final Test of the 1998–99 series against New Zealand. He repeated the feat in March 2005 when he scored 110 and 135 against Pakistan in another man-of-the-match performance, leading India to victory in the second of the three-match series. Scoring 180 in a fifth-wicket partnership of 376 with VVS Laxman, in the Second Test of the Border-Gavaskar Trophy in 2001, Dravid helped lead India to victory by 171 runs despite being asked to follow-on by the Australians. His partnership with Laxman was the third-highest for the fifth wicket in Test cricket history. Dravid's highest Test score of 270, achieved in April 2004 in Rawalpindi, helped India to an innings victory against Pakistan. The performance was the fourth-highest score by an Indian batsman in Test cricket. He scored centuries against all Test playing nations and was the first cricketer to score centuries in all 10 Test playing nations.

Dravid's first ODI century was made against Pakistan in May 1997. He followed that with six centuries in 1999, including two in the 1999 World Cup (against Kenya and Sri Lanka); in the latter he was involved in a then-record 318-run partnership with Sourav Ganguly. His highest score of 153 was made the same year against New Zealand. His total came as part of a record second-wicket partnership of 331 with Sachin Tendulkar and led India to the second-highest ODI total at that time.

== Key ==
* * – Remained not out
* † – Man of the match
* ‡ – Captain of India in that match
* (D/L) – The result of the match was based upon the Duckworth–Lewis method

== Test centuries ==
Test centuries scored by Dravid
| No. | Score | Against | Pos. | Inn. | Test | Venue | H/A | Date | Result | Ref |
|---|---|---|---|---|---|---|---|---|---|---|
| 1 | 148 † | South Africa | 3 | 1 | 3/3 | Wanderers Stadium, Johannesburg | Away | 16 January 1997 | Drawn | |
| 2 | 118 | Zimbabwe | 4 | 2 | 1/1 | Harare Sports Club, Harare | Away | 7 October 1998 | Lost | |
| 3 | 190 | New Zealand | 3 | 2 | 3/3 | WestpacTrust Park, Hamilton | Away | 2 January 1999 | Drawn | |
| 4 | 103* | New Zealand | 3 | 4 | 3/3 | WestpacTrust Park, Hamilton | Away | 2 January 1999 | Drawn | |
| 5 | 107 | Sri Lanka | 3 | 1 | 2/3 | Sinhalese Sports Club Ground, Colombo | Away | 24 February 1999 | Drawn | |
| 6 | 144 | New Zealand | 3 | 3 | 1/2 | Punjab Cricket Association Stadium, Mohali | Home | 10 October 1999 | Drawn | |
| 7 | 200* | Zimbabwe | 3 | 2 | 1/2 | Feroz Shah Kotla Ground, Delhi | Home | 18 November 2000 | Won | |
| 8 | 162 | Zimbabwe | 3 | 1 | 2/2 | Vidarbha Cricket Association Ground, Nagpur | Home | 25 November 2000 | Drawn | |
| 9 | 180 | Australia | 6 | 3 | 2/3 | Eden Gardens, Kolkata | Home | 13 March 2001 | Won | |
| 10 | 144* | West Indies | 5 | 2 | 1/5 | Bourda, Georgetown | Away | 11 April 2002 | Drawn | |
| 11 | 115 | England | 3 | 3 | 2/4 | Trent Bridge, Nottingham | Away | 8 August 2002 | Drawn | |
| 12 | 148 † | England | 3 | 1 | 3/4 | Headingley, Leeds | Away | 22 August 2002 | Won | |
| 13 | 217 † | England | 3 | 2 | 4/4 | The Oval, London | Away | 5 September 2002 | Drawn | |
| 14 | 100* | West Indies | 3 | 1 | 1/3 | Wankhede Stadium, Mumbai | Home | 9 October 2002 | Won | |
| 15 | 222 † | New Zealand | 3 | 1 | 1/2 | Sardar Patel Stadium, Ahmedabad | Home | 8 October 2003 | Drawn | |
| 16 | 233 † | Australia | 3 | 2 | 2/4 | Adelaide Oval, Adelaide | Away | 8 December 2003 | Won | |
| 17 | 270 † | Pakistan | 3 | 2 | 3/3 | Rawalpindi Cricket Stadium, Rawalpindi | Away | 13 April 2004 | Won | |
| 18 | 160 | Bangladesh | 3 | 1 | 2/2 | M. A. Aziz Stadium, Chittagong | Away | 17 December 2004 | Won | |
| 19 | 110 † | Pakistan | 3 | 1 | 2/3 | Eden Gardens, Kolkata | Home | 16 March 2005 | Won | |
| 20 | 135 † | Pakistan | 3 | 3 | 2/3 | Eden Gardens, Kolkata | Home | 16 March 2005 | Won | |
| 21 | 128* ‡ | Pakistan | 2 | 2 | 1/3 | Gaddafi Stadium, Lahore | Away | 13 January 2006 | Drawn | |
| 22 | 103 ‡ | Pakistan | 2 | 2 | 2/3 | Iqbal Stadium, Faisalabad | Away | 21 January 2006 | Drawn | |
| 23 | 146 ‡ | West Indies | 4 | 1 | 2/4 | Beausejour Stadium, Gros Islet | Away | 10 June 2006 | Drawn | |
| 24 | 129 ‡ | Bangladesh | 3 | 1 | 2/2 | Sher-e-Bangla National Stadium, Mirpur | Away | 25 May 2007 | Won | |
| 25 | 111 | South Africa | 3 | 2 | 1/3 | M. A. Chidambaram Stadium, Chennai | Home | 26 March 2008 | Drawn | |
| 26 | 136 | England | 3 | 1 | 2/2 | Punjab Cricket Association Stadium, Mohali | Home | 19 December 2008 | Drawn | |
| 27 | 177 | Sri Lanka | 3 | 1 | 1/3 | Sardar Patel Stadium, Ahmedabad | Home | 16 November 2009 | Drawn | |
| 28 | 144 | Sri Lanka | 3 | 1 | 2/3 | Green Park Stadium, Kanpur | Home | 24 November 2009 | Won | |
| 29 | 111* | Bangladesh | 3 | 2 | 2/2 | Sher-e-Bangla Cricket Stadium, Mirpur | Away | 24 January 2010 | Won | |
| 30 | 104 | New Zealand | 3 | 1 | 1/3 | Sardar Patel Stadium, Ahmedabad | Home | 4 November 2010 | Drawn | |
| 31 | 191 † | New Zealand | 3 | 2 | 3/3 | Vidarbha Cricket Association Stadium, Nagpur | Home | 22 November 2010 | Won | |
| 32 | 112 † | West Indies | 3 | 3 | 1/3 | Sabina Park, Kingston | Away | 22 June 2011 | Won | |
| 33 | 103* | England | 3 | 2 | 1/4 | Lord's, London | Away | 23 July 2011 | Lost | |
| 34 | 117 | England | 2 | 2 | 2/4 | Trent Bridge, Nottingham | Away | 30 July 2011 | Lost | |
| 35 | 146* | England | 2 | 2 | 4/4 | The Oval, London | Away | 21 August 2011 | Lost | |
| 36 | 119 | West Indies | 3 | 1 | 2/3 | Eden Gardens, Kolkata | Home | 14 November 2011 | Won | |

== One Day International centuries ==
ODI centuries scored by Dravid
| No. | Score | Against | Pos. | Inn. | S/R | Venue | H/A/N | Date | Result | Ref |
|---|---|---|---|---|---|---|---|---|---|---|
| 1 | 107 | Pakistan | 3 | 2 | 92.24 | M. A. Chidambaram Stadium, Chennai | Home | 21 May 1997 | Lost | |
| 2 | 123* ‡ | New Zealand | 3 | 1 | 100.00 | Owen Delany Park, Taupō | Away | 9 January 1999 | Lost (D/L) | |
| 3 | 116 | Sri Lanka | 3 | 1 | 98.30 | Vidarbha Cricket Association Ground, Nagpur | Home | 22 March 1999 | Won | |
| 4 | 104* | Kenya | 3 | 1 | 95.41 | Bristol County Ground, Bristol | Neutral | 23 May 1999 | Won | |
| 5 | 145 | Sri Lanka | 3 | 1 | 112.40 | County Ground, Taunton | Neutral | 26 May 1999 | Won | |
| 6 | 103* | West Indies | 3 | 1 | 83.06 | Kallang Ground, Singapore | Neutral | 8 September 1999 | Lost | |
| 7 | 153 | New Zealand | 3 | 1 | 100.00 | Lal Bahadur Shastri Stadium, Hyderabad | Home | 8 November 1999 | Won | |
| 8 | 109* | West Indies | 4 | 2 | 87.90 | Sardar Patel Stadium, Ahmedabad | Home | 15 November 2002 | Won | |
| 9 | 104 ‡ | United Arab Emirates | 5 | 1 | 111.82 | Rangiri Dambulla International Stadium, Dambulla | Neutral | 16 July 2004 | Won | |
| 10 | 104 | Pakistan | 4 | 1 | 74.82 | Jawaharlal Nehru Stadium, Kochi | Home | 2 April 2005 | Won | |
| 11 | 103* † | Sri Lanka | 5 | 1 | 85.83 | Sardar Patel Stadium, Ahmedabad | Home | 6 November 2005 | Lost | |
| 12 | 105 † ‡ | West Indies | 2 | 2 | 102.94 | Sabina Park, Kingston | Away | 18 May 2006 | Won | |

== Sources ==
- Prabhudesai, Devendra (2005): The Nice Guy Who Finished First: A Biography of Rahul Dravid, Rupa Publications India. ISBN 8-12911-650-2.
- Bal, Sambit & Banjar, Sanjay (2012): Rahul Dravid: Timeless Steel, The Walt Disney Company India Pvt. Ltd. ISBN 9-38181-078-8.
