= Indian cricket team in South Africa in 2001–02 =

International cricket tour

India in South Africa 2001–02
	South Africa	India
- Dates: 1 November – 20 November 2001
Captains	Shaun Pollock	Sourav Ganguly

Test series
- Result: South Africa won the 2-match series 1–0
Most runs	Herschelle Gibbs (316)	Sachin Tendulkar (193)
Most wickets	Shaun Pollock (16)	Javagal Srinath (13)
- Player of the series: Herschelle Gibbs (SA)

The Indian cricket team toured South Africa for two Tests from 1 November to 20 November 2001. South Africa won the Test series 1–0.

== Test matches ==
=== 1st Test ===
3–6 November 2001
Scorecard

India	v	South Africa
379 (95.1 overs); Sachin Tendulkar 155 (184); Shaun Pollock 4/91 (27 overs)		563 (143 overs); Lance Klusener 108 (124); Javagal Srinath 5/140 (33 overs)
237 (69.4 overs); Shiv Sunder Das 62 (96); Shaun Pollock 6/56 (21.4 overs)		54/1 (14.4 overs); Gary Kirsten 30* (48); Anil Kumble 1/23 (4 overs)

South Africa won by 9 wickets
Goodyear Park, Bloemfontein
Umpires: Asoka de Silva (SL) and Dave Orchard (SA)
Player of the match: Shaun Pollock (SA)

- South Africa won the toss and decided to field.
- Virender Sehwag (Ind) scored his first century in Tests.

=== 2nd Test ===
16–20 November 2001
Scorecard

South Africa	v	India
362 (121 overs); Herschelle Gibbs 196 (354); Javagal Srinath 6/76 (30 overs)		201 (62 overs); VVS Laxman 89 (121); Shaun Pollock 5/40 (16 overs)
233/5d (78 overs); Jacques Kallis 89* (229); Javagal Srinath 2/28 (17 overs)		206/3 (96.2 overs); Rahul Dravid 87 (241); Nantie Hayward 2/58 (25 overs)

Match drawn
St. George's Park, Port Elizabeth
Umpires: Ian Howell (SA) and Russell Tiffin (Zim)
Player of the match: Herschelle Gibbs (SA)

- India won the toss and decided to field.

=== Unofficial 3rd Test ===
23-27 November 2001
Scorecard

India	v	South Africa
232 (97.4 overs); Shiv Sunder Das 46 (132); Nantie Hayward 4/74 (28.4 overs)		566/8d (157.1 overs); Shaun Pollock 113 (109); Javagal Srinath 2/94 (27 overs)
261 (84.1 overs); Shiv Sunder Das 48 (145); Makhaya Ntini 2/27 (18 overs)

South Africa won by an innings and 73 runs.
Centurion Park, Centurion
Umpires: Dave Orchard (SA) and Rudi Koertzen (SA)
Player of the match: Shaun Pollock (SA)

- South Africa won the toss and decided to field.

== See also ==
- Mike Denness and Indian cricket team incident
