= Rahul Dravid: Timeless Steel =

Anthological biography

- Author: Rahul Dravid, Sambit Bal, Sanjay Bangar and others
- Cover artist: Harish Mohan
- Language: English
- Genre: Biography, Anthology
- Publisher: The Walt Disney Company India Pvt. Ltd.
- Publication date: July 2012
- Publication place: India
- Media type: Print Hardback
- Pages: 256 pp (including an 18-page photo gallery)
- ISBN: 978-93-81810-78-1

Rahul Dravid: Timeless Steel is an anthological biography about the Indian cricketer Rahul Dravid published in 2012 by The Walt Disney Company India Pvt. Ltd. and ESPN Cricinfo. It compiles 24 articles written about Dravid, before and during 2012, the year when he announced his retirement from international cricket. The book also features four Dravid interviews (by Cricinfo), the Bradman Oration he delivered in Australia in 2011, a summary of his statistics, and an 18-page photo gallery of his career. Many of the articles are sourced from other media articles/interviews, including many by ESPNcricinfo itself.

== Reviews ==
The book received generally favourable reviews in the media. IBNlive.com called it an "apt, well compiled ode to the legend." Times of India called it a "must-read for those who want get a peek into the life" of Dravid, but deemed Greg Chappell's article controversial. TheSportsCampus.com singled out two articles as outstanding - The Bradman Oration and the piece by Ed Smith, Dravid's Kent team-mate. Myquickreviews.com listed the quality of the pieces and the writing along with the rare pictures as pros but listed the fact that it is a collection of already published articles as a con. Sportskeeda.com gave a mixed review, saying that the book understated the role of Dravid in ODIs - in general and as a wicketkeeper. Also, his role as a mentor is not reflected. It concludes by saying "the book is not definitive; it is not supposed to be."
