= Centurion Park =

Cricket ground

- Centurion

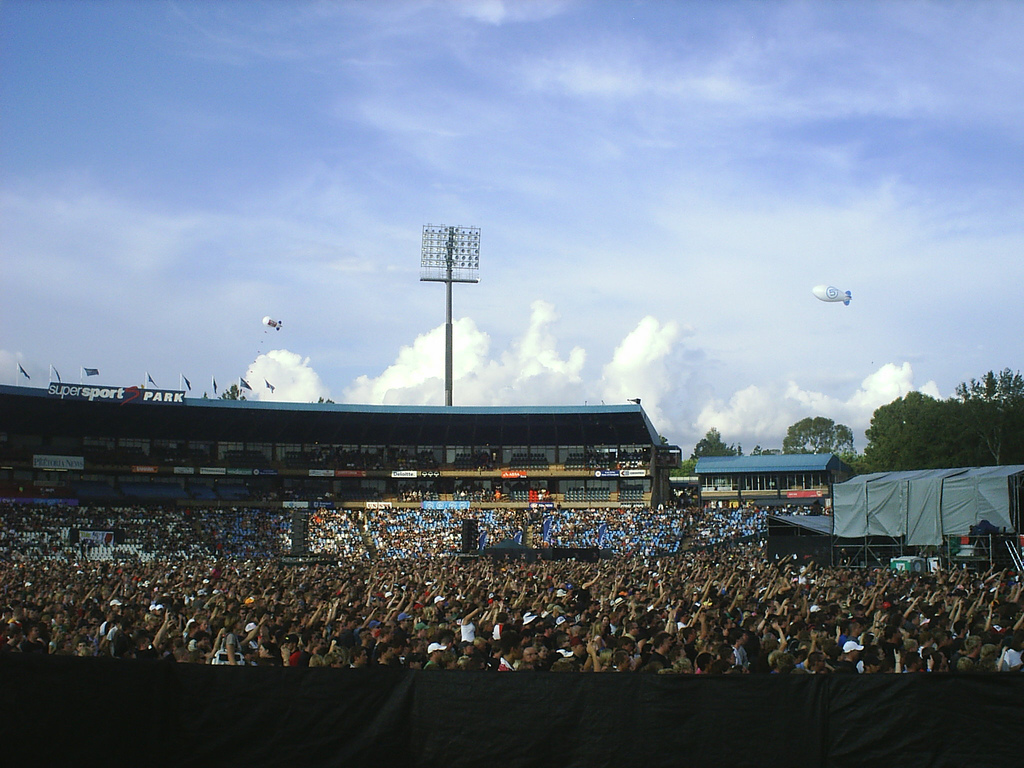
- Crowd during a function in 2006 at the park
- Interactive map of Centurion Park

Ground information
- Location: Centurion, South Africa
- Country: South Africa
- Coordinates: 25°51′35″S 28°11′43″E
- Capacity: 22,000
- Owner: SuperSport
- Tenants: South Africa national cricket team
- End names
- West Lane End; Hennops River End

International information
- First men's Test: 16–20 November 1995: South Africa v England
- Last men's Test: 26–29 December 2024: South Africa v Pakistan
- First men's ODI: 11 December 1992: South Africa v India
- Last men's ODI: 15 September 2023: South Africa v Australia
- First men's T20I: 29 March 2009: South Africa v Australia
- Last men's T20I: 26 March 2023: South Africa v West Indies
- First women's ODI: 13 March 2002: South Africa v India
- Last women's ODI: 12 February 2016: South Africa v England
- First women's T20I: 21 February 2018: South Africa v India
- Last women's T20I: 6 February 2019: South Africa v Sri Lanka

Team information
Northerns	(1995–present)
Titans	(2004–present)
Tshwane Spartans	(2018-2019)
Pretoria Capitals	(2023-present)
- As of 28 December 2023; Source: Cricinfo

Centurion Park is a cricket ground in Centurion in South Africa. It is also known as SuperSport Park since television company SuperSport bought shares in the stadium. The capacity of the ground is 22,000.

The Titans cricket team have played most of their home games here since 2004. The ground was home to the Titans' predecessor team Northerns (previously Northern Transvaal) since 1986. It is also the home ground of the Pretoria Capitals.

== Name ==
The town of Verwoerdburg was renamed Centurion at the end of apartheid, with the politically neutral new name of the town coming from that of the cricket ground.

== Notable fixtures ==
=== Test matches ===
The first Test match at Centurion was held in November 1995, as the opening match of the first post-apartheid tour of South Africa by the England cricket team; however, the match was drawn after being severely affected by rain.

Centurion was the venue for the notorious fifth Test match of the next England tour in 2000, when (after three days' play were lost to rain) South African captain Hansie Cronje forfeited his team's second innings to allow for a result on the final day of the match, which England won. It was later revealed that Cronje had done so after being approached by a bookmaker and offered money to stop the match ending in a draw.

Further controversy occurred in 2001, when the scheduled third Test between South Africa and India at Centurion was declared to be an "unofficial" Test after the Board of Control for Cricket in India refused to accept the International Cricket Council's match referee, Mike Denness, who had disciplined several Indian players in the previous match at Port Elizabeth.

In December 2010, India batsman Sachin Tendulkar scored his 50th Test century at Centurion in the first Test of the 2010–11 Indian tour of South Africa.

From the summer of 2018/19, the ground usually hosts a Boxing Day Test.

=== One-Day Internationals ===
Centurion was a venue for the 2003 Cricket World Cup which took place in South Africa. It was also selected as a venue for the 2009 ICC Champions Trophy and hosted the final on 5 October 2009.

=== SA20 ===
Centurion is the home ground of the Pretoria Capitals, who play in the SA20.

=== Other cricket competitions ===
The 2009 Indian Premier League was held in South Africa, and Centurion was one of eight grounds used. It hosted twelve matches, including one of the semi-finals.

Supersport Park also hosted a domestic and continental Sixes tournament, where home side, the Titans, came out on top in the domestic competition, and South Africa winning the continental competition against Kenya in the final.

=== Other sports ===
Centurion hosted an Australian rules football practice match in 2008 between Carlton and Fremantle.

== Music ==
On 17 September 2011, Irish vocal pop band Westlife held a concert for Gravity Tour supporting their album Gravity.

== Records ==
=== Cricket records ===
==== Test records ====
- Highest Test Total: 621 – South Africa vs. Sri Lanka, 26 December 2020
- Highest Individual Test Score: 208 – Hashim Amla, South Africa vs. West Indies, 17 December 2014
- Best Test Innings Bowling Figures: 7/29 – Kyle Abbott, South Africa vs. Pakistan, 22 February 2013
- Best Test Match Bowling Figures: 13/144 – Kagiso Rabada, South Africa vs. England, 22 January 2016

== See also ==
- List of Test cricket grounds
