= Mike Denness and the Indian cricket team incident =

Scandal in cricket

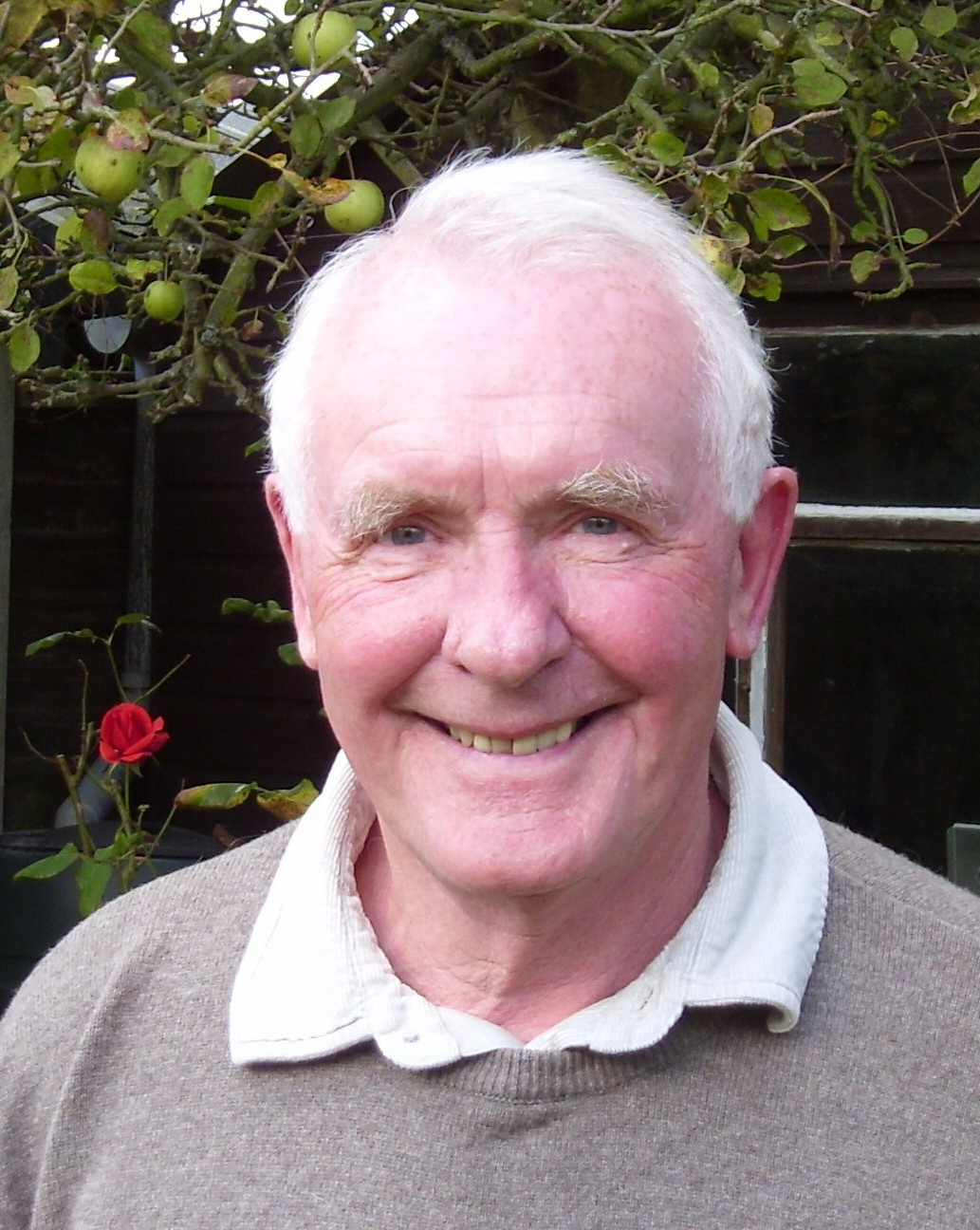
Mike Denness

Match referee Mike Denness, a former England captain, found six India players guilty of various offences during the second Test match of India's 2001 tour of South Africa, played between 16 and 20 November 2001 at St George's Park, Port Elizabeth. The severity of Denness's punishment to an unprecedented six players was viewed by the India media as motivated by racism, outraged the general public and remains controversial to this day.

== Second Test ==
In the laws of cricket, changing the condition of the ball is a serious offence, and considered to be illegal. Sachin Tendulkar was caught on camera running his nail around the seam of the ball, which was deemed by Denness as falling under rules against cleaning the ball without the umpires permission, but was widely reported as ball tampering. Four other players were charged with "excessive appealing", while Virender Sehwag faced an additional charge of running toward the umpire during his appeal. Team captain Sourav Ganguly was also cited for failing to control his team's behaviour.

In addition to forfeiture of a certain percentage of their match fees, the following suspensions were handed to the Indian players:

- Sachin Tendulkar: suspended ban for one Test Match due to not informing the umpire before cleaning the ball.
- Virender Sehwag: banned for one Test match due to excessive appealing.
- Sourav Ganguly: suspended ban for one Test match and two One Day Internationals due to inability to control the behaviour of his team.
- Harbhajan Singh: suspended ban for one Test match due to excessive appealing.
- Shiv Sunder Das: suspended ban for one Test match due to excessive appealing.
- Deep Dasgupta: suspended ban for one Test match due to excessive appealing.

Denness was heavily criticised for failing to explain his actions at the press conference announcing the punishments. Denness himself had not wished to hold the press conference and had been ordered to by the ICC.

Indian journalists hounded Denness regarding an alleged failure to penalise Shaun Pollock and Nantie Hayward for what Indian reporters described as similar incidents of "excessive appealing". The incident infuriated the Indian cricket establishment, precipitating an international cricketing, political and administrative crisis. In response to Denness's inability to explain his actions at the press conference, former Indian cricketer Ravi Shastri, who was then working as a commentator, stated "If Mike Denness cannot answer questions, why is he here? We know what he looks like."

== Public outrage, "Unofficial" Test and Sehwag's ban ==
There was a huge outrage in India where protestors took to the streets and burnt effigies of Denness. The matter was raised in the Indian parliament, the popular press termed Denness a racist, and the ICC was accused of discriminating against the emerging Third World.

The Board of Control for Cricket in India (BCCI) threatened to call off its tour of South Africa unless Denness was replaced as match referee for the third Test, scheduled for 23–27 November at SuperSport Park, Centurion. The International Cricket Council (ICC) supported Denness but the South African board sided with the BCCI's position and the two teams played an "unofficial" Test instead. Denness, who was not even allowed to enter the stadium, was replaced as match referee by the South African Denis Lindsay. Consequently, the ICC declared the match to be "unofficial" and instead classified it as a "friendly five-day match"; the Test series was thus limited to the two matches already completed, with South Africa winning 1–0.

The ICC overturned the bans on Tendulkar and Ganguly, but upheld the ban on Sehwag for the subsequent Test. ICC declared that Tendulkar was not guilty of ball tampering and noted that cleaning the ball without the umpire's permission is "still an offence but it's not as serious as ball tampering."

The subsequent England tour to India was placed in jeopardy when India picked Sehwag in the Test squad. Subsequent to this development, the ICC issued a warning that any Test match with Sehwag in the Indian team would not be considered an official Test until Sehwag served his ban. After negotiations with the England and Wales Cricket Board (ECB) and the ICC, and in the general interest of cricket, Sehwag was dropped from the team for the first Test against England.

== After the incident ==
Mike Denness served as match referee in only two more Tests and three more One Day Internationals. These were all in the series between Pakistan and the West Indies in Sharjah, United Arab Emirates, during January and February 2002. He retired as a match referee for health reasons, and died in 2013 from cancer.

An ICC Disputes Resolution Committee hearing headed by Michael Beloff QC, the then Chairman of the ICC Code of Conduct Commission, was scheduled to hear the case on 6–7 June 2002. But the hearing was postponed a week before its scheduled date due to the ill-health and surgery plans of Denness.

The Resolution Committee never met to decide on the merits of the cases of Denness and the Indian team as the BCCI decided to forgo the case in view of Denness' heart surgery.

== See also ==
- Indian cricket team in South Africa in 2001–02
