= 2004–05 BCCI Platinum Jubilee Match =

Cricket match

BCCI Platinum Jubilee Match
India	Pakistan
(India)	(Pakistan)
292/6	293/4
50 overs	49 overs
- Date: 13 November 2004
- Venue: Eden Gardens, Kolkata
- Player of the match: (Pakistan) Salman Butt
- Umpires: (India) Krishna Hariharan (On-field) (Australia) Simon Taufel (On-field) (India) Ivaturi Shivram (TV Umpire) (Cricket West Indies) Clive Lloyd (Match Referee)

The BCCI Platinum Jubilee match was played between India and Pakistan on 13 November 2004 at Eden Gardens in Kolkata, as a part of BCCI's week-long platinum jubilee celebrations to commemorate 75 years of the board's existence.

== Squads ==
India	Pakistan
Sourav Ganguly (c); Rahul Dravid (vc); Virender Sehwag; Sachin Tendulkar; VVS Laxman; Yuvraj Singh; Dinesh Karthik (wk); Irfan Pathan; Harbhajan Singh; Anil Kumble; Zaheer Khan; Ajit Agarkar; Mohammad Kaif; Ashish Nehra; Sridharan Sriram	Inzamam-ul-Haq (c); Younis Khan (vc); Imran Farhat; Taufeeq Umar; Shoaib Malik; Yousuf Youhana; Abdul Razzaq; Shahid Afridi; Kamran Akmal (wk); Mohammad Sami; Naved-ul-Hasan; Shoaib Akhtar; Salman Butt; Riaz Afridi; Aamer Bashir

== Match ==
=== Details ===
India won the toss and elected to bat first. Openers Sachin Tendulkar and Virender Sehwag gave India a good start before Tendulkar was run-out for 16 runs. However, India continued to score at a good pace with VVS Laxman joining Sehwag for a partnership of 92 runs. Once Laxman and Sehwag were dismissed by Shahid Afridi for 43 runs and 53 runs respectively, captain Sourav Ganguly played a cautious innings of 48 runs after Rahul Dravid was dismissed cheaply. Yuvraj Singh was the top-scorer for the Indian team with 78 runs off 62 deliveries, including 10 fours and 2 sixes. India finished their innings at 292/6.

Pakistan, in reply, lost Younis Khan for 0 with Zaheer Khan taking his wicket. After his dismissal, Salman Butt and Shoaib Malik stitched a partnership of 113 runs before Butt retired hurt on 68* when Pakistan were 155/2. Captain Inzamam-ul-Haq was joined by Malik before Sehwag dismissed him for 61 runs. Butt, who had retired to the pavilion, returned to play and scored a match-winning century along with Inzamam, who contributed 75 runs in their 98-run partnership to take the match away from India. Pakistan reached their target of 293 runs for the loss of 4 wickets with an over to spare, with Butt remaining unbeaten on 108 runs off 130 deliveries.

13 November 2004
Scorecard

India; 292/6 (50 overs)	v	Pakistan; 293/4 (49 overs)
Yuvraj Singh 78 (62); Shahid Afridi 2/29 (10 overs)		Salman Butt 108* (130); Ashish Nehra 2/65 (10 overs)

Pakistan won by 6 wickets
Eden Gardens, Kolkata
Umpires: Krishna Hariharan (Ind) and Simon Taufel (Aus)
Player of the match: Salman Butt (Pak)

- India won the toss and elected to bat.

=== Scorecard ===
1st innings

India Batting
Player	Status	Runs	Balls	4s	6s	Strike rate
Virender Sehwag	b Shahid Afridi	53	65	6	2	81.53
Sachin Tendulkar	run out (Younis Khan)	16	17	2	0	94.11
VVS Laxman	c Kamran Akmal b Shahid Afridi	43	44	5	0	97.72
Sourav Ganguly (c)	c Kamran Akmal b Shoaib Akhtar	48	70	1	2	68.57
Rahul Dravid †	c Shahid Afridi b Abdul Razzaq	16	34	1	0	47.05
Yuvraj Singh	c Younis Khan b Naved-ul-Hasan	78	62	10	2	125.80
Mohammad Kaif	not out	14	11	0	0	127.27
Irfan Pathan	not out	0	0	0	0	0
Harbhajan Singh	did not bat					
Zaheer Khan	did not bat					
Ashish Nehra	did not bat					
Extras	(b 4, lb 6, nb 3, w 11)	24				
Total	(6 wickets; 50 overs)	292				

Fall of wickets: 1–29 (Tendulkar, 5.3 ov), 2–111 (Laxman, 4.2 ov), 3–124 (Sehwag, 21.5 ov), 4–163 (Dravid, 32.4 ov), 5-237 (Ganguly, 44.2 ov), 6-290 (Yuvraj Singh, 49.5 ov)

Pakistan Bowling
Bowler	Overs	Maidens	Runs	Wickets	Econ	Wides	NBs
Shoaib Akhtar	9	1	55	1	6.11	3	1
Naved-ul-Hasan	9	1	67	1	7.44	4	1
Mohammad Sami	6	0	51	0	8.50	1	0
Shahid Afridi	10	0	29	2	2.90	2	0
Shoaib Malik	6	0	31	0	5.16	0	0
Abdul Razzaq	10	0	49	1	4.90	1	1

2nd innings

Fall of wickets: 1-15 (Younis Khan, 3.2 ov), 2-128 (Shoaib Malik, 23.5 ov), 2-155 (28.2 ov), 3-186 (Mohammad Yousuf, 35.5 ov), 4-284 (Inzamam-ul-Haq, 48.2 ov)

Pakistan Batting
Player	Status	Runs	Balls	4s	6s	Strike rate
Salman Butt	not out	108	130	13	0	83.07
Younis Khan	c Sehwag b Zaheer	0	8	0	0	0
Shoaib Malik	c Kaif b Sehwag	61	55	5	2	110.90
Inzamam-ul-Haq (c)	c Sehwag b Nehra	75	75	8	1	100
Mohammad Yousuf	c †Dravid b Nehra	18	25	1	0	72
Abdul Razzaq	not out	1	3	0	0	33.33
Shahid Afridi	did not bat					
Kamran Akmal †	did not bat					
Naved-ul-Hasan	did not bat					
Mohammad Sami	did not bat					
Shoaib Akhtar	did not bat					
Extras	(lb 5, nb 2, w 23)	30				
Total	(4 wickets; 49 overs)	293				

India Bowling
Bowler	Overs	Maidens	Runs	Wickets	Econ	Wides	NBs
Irfan Pathan	10	1	48	0	4.80	2	0
Zaheer Khan	10	1	47	1	4.70	2	1
Ashish Nehra	10	0	65	2	6.50	1	1
Harbhajan Singh	10	0	51	0	5.10	3	0
Virender Sehwag	6	0	43	1	7.16	1	0
Sachin Tendulkar	1	0	15	0	15	0	0
Sourav Ganguly	1	0	9	0	9	0	0
Yuvraj Singh	1	0	10	0	10	0	0
