= Sanjay Bangar =

Indian cricket commentator, coach, and player

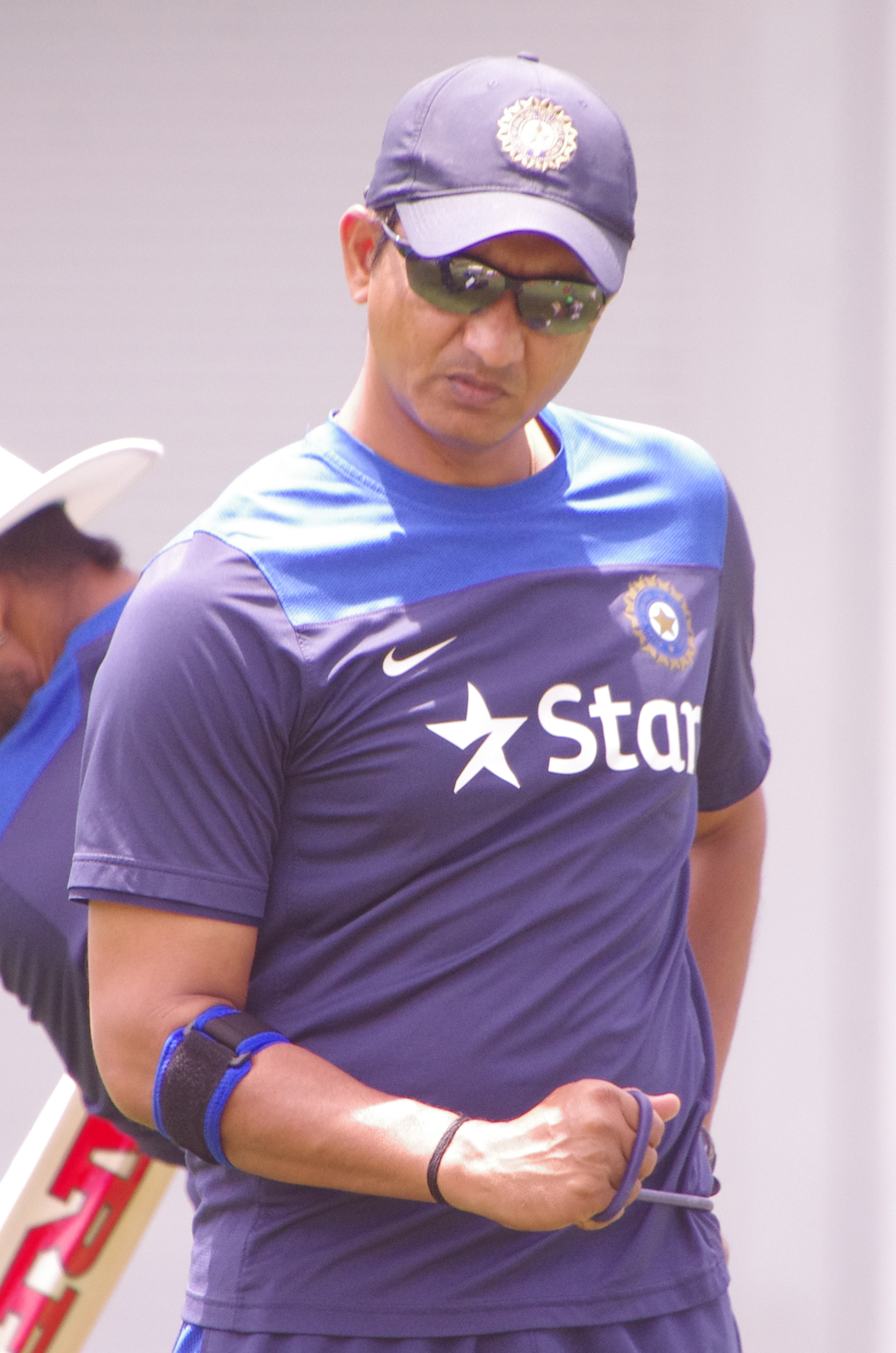

Personal information
- Full name: Sanjay Bapusaheb Bangar
- Born: 11 October 1972 (age 54); Beed, Maharashtra, India
- Batting: Right-handed
- Bowling: Right-arm medium
- Role: All-rounder

International information
- National side: India (2001–2004)
- Test debut (cap 240): 3 December 2001 v England
- Last Test: 19 December 2002 v New Zealand
- ODI debut (cap 141): 25 January 2002 v England
- Last ODI: 24 January 2004 v Zimbabwe

Domestic team information
- Years: Team
- 1993–2014: Railways
- 2008: Deccan Chargers
- 2009: Kolkata Knight Riders

Career statistics
Competition	Test	ODI	FC	LA
Matches	12	15	165	112
Runs scored	470	180	8,349	2,560
Batting average	29.37	13.84	33.13	26.66
100s/50s	1/3	0/1	13/49	3/15
Top score	100*	57*	212	139
Balls bowled	762	442	21,837	4,264
Wickets	7	7	300	92
Bowling average	49.00	54.85	31.13	38.40
5 wickets in innings	0	0	9	0
10 wickets in match	0	0	1	0
Best bowling	2/23	2/39	6/41	4/35
Catches/stumpings	4/–	4/–	143/–	31/–
- Source: ESPNcricinfo, 7 September 2014

Sanjay Bapusaheb Bangar (born 11 October 1972) is an Indian cricket commentator and the head of cricket development of the IPL franchise Punjab Kings. He is a former Indian international cricketer. He played as an all-rounder and represented the India national cricket team in Tests and ODIs.

== Early life ==
Bangar was born in Beed, Maharashtra, India. He has completed his schooling from Saint Francis De Sales High School, Chhatrapati Sambhajinagar. He completed his Bachelor of Commerce from Ramniranjan Jhunjhunwala College, Ghatkopar. He has also completed Company Secretaries Intermediate Course.

== Playing career ==
Bangar began his career playing in the youth teams of Maharashtra and Mumbai, but at the state level, he made his name representing Railways with his medium-pace bowling and sound defensive batting technique.

In the 2000–01 season, Railways reached the final of the Ranji Trophy where they lost to Baroda. The following season, they went one better and defeated Baroda to win the competition. Bangar's performances had caught the eyes of the selectors and he was called up to the Indian squad for their matches against England in the 2001–02 season.

In only his second Test, he scored 100 not out against Zimbabwe at Nagpur batting at number 7. On the 2002 tour of England, he was promoted to open the innings at Headingley after some poor performances by Wasim Jaffer. He responded with his most important innings for India, making a patient 68 on the first day in an invaluable partnership with Rahul Dravid in difficult swinging and seaming conditions. Later on in the same match he also chipped in with two important wickets to set up a rare innings victory for India away from home.

Bangar was part of India's squad for the World Cup 2003 where India finished as Runners up, but his performances for India began to tail off, and he made his final appearance for his country in 2004, appearing in 12 Test matches and 15 One Day Internationals in all. He made important contributions to 7 test match wins for India.

He later became the captain of Railways and led them to two major championship titles, the Ranji Trophy and the Irani Trophy victory in 2004–05. He also led the Railways team to a Ranji Trophy One Day National Championship in 2005–06. Along with Vijay Hazare, he is only one of two players to score 6,000 runs and take 200 wickets in the Ranji Trophy. He represented Deccan Chargers in the first IPL season. He played for the Kolkata Knight Riders in the 2009 IPL.

In January 2013, Bangar announced his retirement after 20 of years playing. An article by Sanjay Bangar was featured in the 2012 book Rahul Dravid: Timeless Steel.

== Coaching career ==
Having previously coached India A, Bangar began working with the Kochi Tuskers as batting coach in 2010. In January 2014, Bangar was named assistant coach of Kings XI Punjab ahead of IPL 2014. He was promoted to the role of head coach during the season and coached them to final, the Franchise's best IPL performance to date, where they lost to Kolkata Knight Riders. He went on to Coach Kings XI Punjab for three years until he had to give up his role to comply with the BCCI's conflict of interest rules.

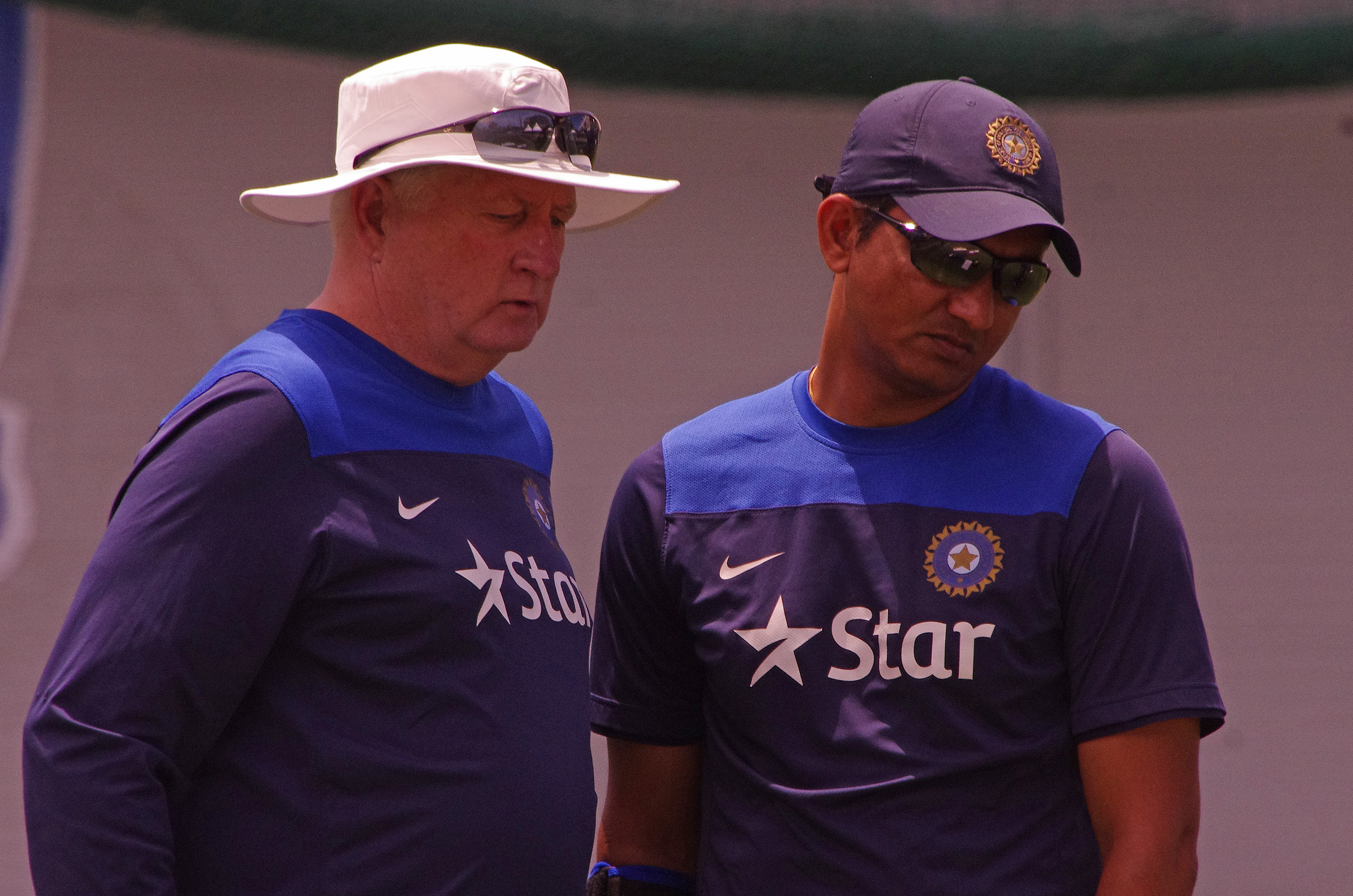
Sanjay Bangar (right) with Duncan Fletcher (left)

In August 2014, he was named batting coach of India after an embarrassing Test series defeat to England. He was named head coach of India national cricket team for Zimbabwe tour in June 2016.

After Anil Kumble was appointed as India's head coach for a one-year tenure starting with the tour of West Indies in July 2016, Bangar was reappointed as the team's batting coach.

Many Indian batsmen, including Indian captain Virat Kohli, Rohit Sharma, KL Rahul and Ajinkya Rahane, have credited Bangar for contributing to their growth.

After Anil Kumble's tenure as head coach ended in June 2017, where Indian Team lost in the Finals of the ICC Champions Trophy, Bangar carried out the role of Interim Coach to India's tour of West Indies in June–July 2017. After Ravi Shastri's reappointment as head coach, Bangar was promoted to the role of Assistant Coach till 2019. Bangar's coaching has been credited for improving India's lower order.

Bangar's tenure as batting coach saw India create several records, with Indian batsmen scoring over 150 centuries and India winning 30 tests out of 52 tests played, 82 ODIs out of 120 ODIs and the Test team staying at top of ICC Test Rankings for over three and half years during his tenure of over 5 years as coach.

In 2018, India toured South Africa in what was considered a mixed bag, with India losing the test series 1-2 but later winning the ODI series by a record 5–1 margin, a feat not accomplished by any other Indian team. India then lost a closely contested Test Series in England by a margin of 1–4, with India's batting and Bangar's role came under criticism for unable to chase a 4th innings target of 193 set by England in the first test. However, later India won a historic Test Series in Australia 2–1, thus ending the 2018 season with 4 rare overseas Test victories in South Africa, England, and Australia.

Bangar's contract with BCCI ended in 2019 after the 2019 World Cup where India lost in the semi finals, although it was widely debated that why only one member of the coaching staff's contract was not renewed. As compared to previous foreign coaches, Bangar's performance was notable. Indian batsmen under him scored a total of 150 centuries including 89 overseas centuries, across formats. In February 2021, Bangar was appointed as a Consultant for Royal Challengers Bangalore for the 2021 Indian Premier League where they finished third in the table and qualified for the play offs.

On 9 November 2021, he was named the New Head Coach of Royal Challengers Bangalore for the 2022 Indian Premier League, a season in which RCB gave their best performance since 2016 before losing the Qualifier 2 match to the eventual finalist Rajasthan Royals.

Ahead of IPL 2023, Bangar was appointed Head of Cricket Development at Punjab Kings, with whom he had worked already (when they were Kings XI Punjab).

== Personal life ==
Sanjay Bangar is married to Kashmira Bangar and has two children: a son, Atharva, and a daughter, Anaya Bangar.
