= Zimbabwean cricket team in India in 2000–01 =

International cricket tour

Zimbabwe's tour of India in 2000-01
	India	Zimbabwe
- Dates: 8 November 2000 – 14 December 2000
Captains	Sourav Ganguly	Heath Streak

Test series
- Result: India won the 2-match series 1–0
Most runs	Rahul Dravid (432)	Andy Flower (540)
Most wickets	Javagal Srinath (12)	Heath Streak (3)
- Player of the series: Andy Flower

One Day International series
- Results: India won the 5-match series 4–1
Most runs	Sachin Tendulkar (287)	Alistair Campbell (179)
Most wickets	Ajit Agarkar (10)	Brian Murphy (6)
- Player of the series: Sourav Ganguly

Zimbabwean national cricket team toured India in 2000-01 season. The tour lasted from 8 November to 14 December and included series of 2 Tests and 5 One Day Internationals. India won the Test series by 1-0 and ODIs series by 4-1.

== Tour matches ==
=== Three-day: National Cricket Academy XI v Zimbabwe XI ===
8–10 Nov 2000
Scorecard

Zimbabwe	v	National Cricket Academy XI
322/6 (79 overs); Alistair Campbell 114* (193); Rakesh Patel 3/69 (17 overs)		323/6 (73 overs); Sridharan Sriram 97 (148); Paul Strang 3/82 (15 overs)
320/5 (102 overs); Andy Flower 119 (180); Rakesh Patel 2/43 (10 overs)		42/1 (11 overs); Gautam Gambhir 22 (27); Henry Olonga 1/28 (6 overs)

Match drawn
Nehru Stadium, Indore
Umpires: A. Y. Gokhale (Ind) and R. Radhakrishnan (Ind)

- Zimbabwe XI won the toss and elected to field.

=== Three-day: Indian Board President's XI v Zimbabwe XI ===
13–15 Nov 2000
Scorecard

Indian Board President's XI	v	Zimbabwe
314/5 (90 overs); Hrishikesh Kanitkar 118 (190); Paul Strang 3/59 (20 overs)		236/5 (73 overs); Gavin Rennie 79 (183); Aashish Kapoor 2/49 (19 overs)
183/2 (54 overs); Virender Sehwag 58 (47); Mluleki Nkala 2/27 (15 overs)		262/6 (54 overs); Andy Flower 94 (103); Rahul Sanghvi 3/93 (17 overs)

Zimbabwe XI won by 4 wickets
Nahar Singh Stadium, Faridabad
Umpires: Sanjeeva Rao (Ind) and M. S. Mahal (Ind)

- Indian Board President's XI won the toss and elected to bat.

== Test series ==
=== 1st Test ===
18 November 2000
Scorecard

Zimbabwe	v	India
422/9 (168 overs); Andy Flower 183* (351); Javagal Srinath 4/81 (35 overs)		458/4 (142.4 overs); Rahul Dravid 200 (350); Henry Olonga 2/75 (20 overs)
225 (80.1 overs); Andy Flower 70 (134); Javagal Srinath 5/60 (24.1 overs)		190/3 (37.3 overs); Rahul Dravid 70* (91); Heath Streak 1/18 (5 overs)

India won by 7 wickets
Feroz Shah Kotla, Delhi
Umpires: JH Hampshire and S Venkataraghavan
Player of the match: Javagal Srinath

- Zimbabwe won the toss and decided to bat
- Vijay Dahiya made his debut in Test matches

=== 2nd Test ===
25 November 2000
Scorecard

India	v	Zimbabwe
609/6 (155.5 overs); Sachin Tendulkar 201* (281); Grant Flower 2/101 (24 overs)		382 (120.1 overs); Grant Flower 106* (196); Javagal Srinath 3/81 (28.1 overs)
		503/6 (161 overs) (f/o); Andy Flower 232* (444); Sarandeep Singh 4/136 (49 overs)

Match drawn
Vidarbha Cricket Association Ground, Nagpur
Umpires: AV Jayaprakash and RS Dunne
Player of the match: Andy Flower

- India won the toss and decided to bat
- Sarandeep Singh made his debut in Test matches

== ODI series ==
=== 1st ODI ===
2 December 2000
Scorecard

Zimbabwe; 253/6 (50 overs)	v	India; 255/7 (47.2 overs)
Stuart Carlisle 91* (125); Ajit Agarkar 2/74 (10 overs)		Hemang Badani 58*(69); Brian Murphy 2/45 (6 overs)

India won by 3 wickets
Barabati Stadium, Cuttack
Umpires: Jasbir Singh (Ind) and Arani Jayaprakash (Ind)
Player of the match: Hemang Badani (Ind)

- Zimbabwe won the toss and elected to bat.
- Reetinder Sodhi (Ind) made his ODI debut.

=== 2nd ODI ===
6 December 2000
Scorecard

India; 306/5 (50 overs)	v	Zimbabwe; 245/8 (50 overs)
Sourav Ganguly 144 (152); Travis Friend 1/37 (10 overs)		Heath Streak 51 (57); Sridharan Sriram 3/47 (8 overs)

India won by 61 runs
Sardar Patel Stadium, Motera, Ahmedabad
Umpires: Krishna Hariharan (Ind) and Srinivas Venkataraghavan (Ind)
Player of the match: Sourav Ganguly (Ind)

- India won the toss and elected to bat.

=== 3rd ODI ===
8 December 2000
Scorecard

India; 283/8 (50 overs)	v	Zimbabwe; 284/9 (49.5 Overs)
Sachin Tendulkar 146 (153); Grant Flower 3/43 (10 overs)		Andy Flower 70 (94); Venkatesh Prasad 3/61 (10 overs)

Zimbabwe won by 1 wicket
Barkatullah Khan Stadium, Jodhpur
Player of the match: Grant Flower (Zim)

- India won the toss and elected to bat.
- It was the first ODI played at this venue.
- Sachin Tendulkar (Ind) broke Desmond Haynes' (Win) record for most centuries scored on home soil. He also became the first to score 1,000 runs against Zimbabwe in ODIs.
- Zaheer Khan scored 25 runs in the 50th over of India's innings, the most by an India player in an over of an ODI.
- Andy Flower and Grant Flower's partnership of 158 runs was Zimbabwe's highest for the fourth wicket in an ODI.
- Ajit Agarkar (Ind) picked his 100th wicket in ODIs.
- Zimbabwe's total of 284 was their highest against India in ODIs.
- Zimbabwe's win margin of one wicket was their narrowest in ODIs.

=== 4th ODI ===
11 December 2000
Scorecard

Zimbabwe; 165 (45.4 overs)	v	India; 166/1 (25 overs)
Alistair Campbell 32 (44); Sourav Ganguly 5/34 (10 overs)		Sourav Ganguly 71* (68); Travis Friend 1/40 (5 overs)

India won by 9 wickets
Green Park, Kanpur
Umpires: Chandra Sathe (Ind) and Devendra Sharma (Ind)
Player of the match: Sourav Ganguly (Ind)

- Zimbabwe won the toss and elected to bat.

=== 5th ODI ===
14 December 2000 ,
Scorecard

India; 301/6 (50 overs)	v	Zimbabwe; 262 (47.4 overs)
Hemang Badani 77 (99); Brian Murphy 3/63 (10 overs)		Trevor Madondo 71 (70); Ajit Agarkar 3/26 (8.4 overs)

India won by 39 runs
Madhavrao Scindia Cricket Ground, Rajkot
Umpires: Vinayak Kulkarni (Ind) and Amiesh Saheba (Ind)
Player of the match: Ajit Agarkar (Ind)

- Zimbabwe won the toss and elected to field.
- Amiesh Saheba (Ind) officiated for the first time in ODIs as an umpire.
- This was Rahul Dravid's first match as India captain.
- Ajit Agarkar beat the record held by Kapil Dev for the fastest fifty by an India player in ODIs (21 balls).
- This was the last time a Men's ODI match was played during the daytime, with white clothing and a red ball.
