= Rahul Dravid =

Indian coach and former cricketer (born 11 January 1973)

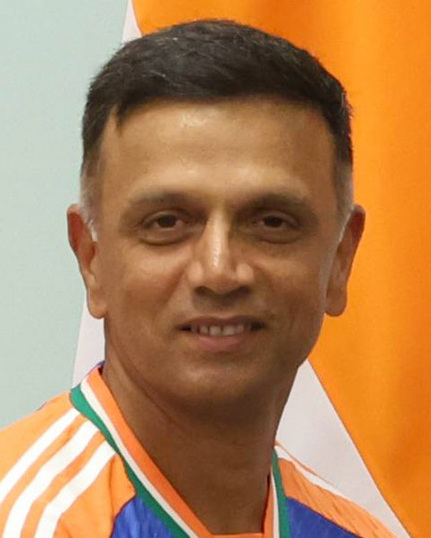
- Dravid in 2024

Personal information
- Full name: Rahul Sharad Dravid
- Born: 11 January 1973 (age 53); Indore, Madhya Pradesh, India
- Nickname: The Wall, Mr Dependable
- Height: 1.80 m (5 ft 11 in)
- Batting: Right-handed
- Bowling: Right arm off break
- Role: Top-order batter
- Website: www.rahuldravid.com

International information
- National side: India (1996–2012)
- Test debut (cap 207): 20 June 1996 v England
- Last Test: 24 January 2012 v Australia
- ODI debut (cap 95): 3 April 1996 v Sri Lanka
- Last ODI: 16 September 2011 v England
- ODI shirt no.: 19
- Only T20I (cap 38): 31 August 2011 v England
- T20I shirt no.: 19

Domestic team information
- Years: Team
- 1990–2012: Karnataka
- 2000: Kent
- 2003: Scottish Saltires
- 2008–2010: Royal Challengers Bangalore
- 2011–2013: Rajasthan Royals

Head coaching information
- Years: Team
- 2015–2021: India U19
- 2015–2021: India A
- 2021–2024: India

Career statistics
Competition	Test	ODI	FC	LA
Matches	164	344	298	449
Runs scored	13,288	10,889	23,794	15,271
Batting average	52.31	39.16	55.33	42.30
100s/50s	36/63	12/83	68/117	21/112
Top score	270	153	270	153
Balls bowled	120	186	617	477
Wickets	1	4	5	4
Bowling average	39.00	42.50	54.60	105.25
5 wickets in innings	0	0	0	0
10 wickets in match	0	0	0	0
Best bowling	1/18	2/43	2/16	2/43
Catches/stumpings	210/0	196/14	353/1	233/17
Medal record
Men's cricket
Representing India as Player
ICC Cricket World Cup
Runner-up	2003 South Africa
ICC Champions Trophy
Winner	2002 Sri Lanka
Runner-up	2000 Kenya
ACC Asia Cup
Runner-up	1997 Sri Lanka
Runner-up	2004 Sri Lanka
Representing India as Coach
World Test Championship
Runner-up	2021–23
ICC Cricket World Cup
Runner-up	2023 India
ICC T20 World Cup
Winner	2024 West Indies-United States
ACC Asia Cup
Winner	2023 Pakistan
ICC U19 Cricket World Cup
Winner	2018 New Zealand
Runner-up	2016 Bangladesh
- Source: ESPNcricinfo, 30 January 2012

Rahul Sharad Dravid (born 11 January 1973) is an Indian former cricket player who captained and head-coached the Indian national cricket team. Known for his outstanding batting technique, Dravid scored 24,177 runs in international cricket and is widely regarded as one of the greatest batsmen in the history of cricket. He is colloquially known as Mr. Dependable and often referred to as The Wall. He won the 2002 ICC Champions Trophy as a member of the Indian team and guided the Indian team to victory in the 2024 ICC Men's T20 World Cup as the head coach.

Prior to his appointment to the senior men's national team, Dravid was the Head of Cricket at the National Cricket Academy (NCA), and the head coach of the India Under-19 and India A teams. Under his tutelage, the Under-19 team finished as runners-up at the 2016 Under-19 Cricket World Cup and won the 2018 Under-19 Cricket World Cup. Under his coaching, Indian cricket team finished as runners-up at the 2023 Cricket World Cup and 2023 ICC World Test Championship final and were semifinalist at the 2022 ICC Men's T20 World Cup.

Dravid was named one of the Wisden Cricketers of the Year by Wisden Cricketers' Almanack in 2000 and received the Player of the Year and the Test Player of the Year awards at the inaugural ICC awards ceremony in 2004. In December 2011, he was the first non-Australian cricketer to deliver the Bradman Oration in Canberra. As of May 2026, he is the fifth-highest run scorer in Test cricket, and was the first player to score a century in all ten Test-playing countries (now 12). He holds the records for the most balls faced in Test cricket and the longest time spent batting in Tests.

David retired from One Day International and Twenty20 International cricket in August 2011, and from Test and first-class cricket the following year. In July 2018, he became the fifth Indian cricketer to be inducted into the ICC Hall of Fame.

== Early life and education ==
Dravid was born to a Marathi-speaking Brahmin family in Indore, Madhya Pradesh. His family later moved to Bangalore, Karnataka, where he was raised. His mother tongue is Marathi. Dravid's father, Sharad Dravid, worked for a company that produces jams and preserves, giving rise to the later nickname Jammy. His mother, Pushpa, was a professor of architecture at the University Visvesvaraya College of Engineering in Bangalore. Dravid has a younger brother named Vijay.

Rahul Dravid attended St. Joseph's Boys High School and earned a degree in commerce from St Joseph's College of Commerce. He was selected to India's national cricket team while working towards an MBA at the St Joseph's College of Business Administration. He is fluent in Marathi, Kannada, English and Hindi.

== Formative years and domestic career ==
Dravid started playing cricket at the age of 12 and represented Karnataka at the under-15, the under-17, and the under-19 levels. Former cricketer Keki Tarapore first noticed Dravid's talent while coaching at a summer camp in the Chinnaswamy Stadium. Dravid scored a century for his school team. He also played as wicket-keeper.

Dravid made his Ranji Trophy debut in February 1991, while still attending college. Playing alongside future India teammates Anil Kumble and Javagal Srinath against Maharashtra in Pune, he scored 82 runs in the match, which ended in a draw. He followed it up with a century against Bengal and three successive centuries after. Dravid's first full season took place in 1991–92, when he scored two centuries and finished up with 380 runs at an average of 63.30, resulting in his selection to the South Zone cricket team in the Duleep Trophy. Dravid caught the national team selectors' attention with his positive performances for India A in the home series against England A in 1994–95.

== International career ==
=== Debut ===
Dravid received his first call to the Indian national cricket team in October 1994 for the last two matches of the Wills World Series. However, he could not break into the playing eleven and had to return to the domestic circuit. Despite a stellar show in domestic cricket, Dravid was not selected for the Indian team for the 1996 World Cup, prompting an Indian daily to run an article with the headline – "Rahul Dravid gets a raw deal".

He eventually made his international debut on 3 April 1996 in an ODI against Sri Lanka in the Singer Cup held in Singapore immediately after the 1996 World Cup, replacing Vinod Kambli. He wasn't particularly successful with the bat, scoring only three runs before being dismissed by Muttiah Muralitharan, but took two catches in the match. He followed it up with another failure in the next game, scoring only four runs before being run out against Pakistan.

In contrast to his ODI debut, his Test debut was rather successful. He was selected for the Indian squad touring England on the backdrop of a consistent performance in domestic cricket for five years. Fine performances in the tour games including fifties against Gloucestershire and Leicestershire failed to earn him a place in the team for the First Test. He finally made his Test debut at Lord's on 20 June 1996 against England in the Second Test of the series at the expense of injured senior batsman Sanjay Manjrekar. Manjrekar, who was suffering from an ankle injury, was to undergo a fitness test on the morning of the Second Test. Dravid had already been informed that he would play if Manjrekar failed the test. Manjrekar subsequently failed the test. Ten minutes before the toss, team coach Sandeep Patil informed Dravid that he was indeed going to make his debut that day. Patil recalled years later:

I told him he will be playing. His face lit up. I cannot forget that moment.

Coming in to bat at no. 7, he forged important partnerships, first with another debutant Sourav Ganguly and then with Indian lower order, securing a vital first innings lead for his team. Dravid scored 95 runs missing out on a debut hundred as he walked off after getting caught behind to a Chris Lewis delivery. During this match, he also took his first catch in Test cricket to dismiss Nasser Hussain off the bowling of Srinath. In the next tour game against British Universities, Dravid scored a hundred. He scored another fifty in the first innings of the Third Test. Dravid concluded a successful debut series with an average of 62.33 from two Test matches.

I had played five years of first-class cricket to break into the Indian team ... scored a lot of runs in domestic cricket ... was lucky to get the opportunity ... knew that probably it would be the only one. Otherwise I would have to go back to domestic cricket and start the cycle all over again ... I remember when I was 50 not out at the end of the day ... walking back to the hotel with Srinath and I knew somehow that this was probably a very significant innings. I knew I had some more breathing space ... a few more Test matches at least ... gave me a lot of confidence scoring 95 here and 80 at Trent Bridge ... as a player and as a person.

— Rahul Dravid, reflecting back on his Test debut 15 years later, during India tour of England, 2011.

=== 1996–98: Early years ===
Dravid's early years in international cricket mirrored his international debut. He had contrasting fortunes in the long and the shorter format of the game. While he was successful in Test cricket, he struggled with ODIs.

After his Test debut in England, Dravid played in the one-off Test against Australia in Delhi – his first Test in India. Batting at no. 6, he scored 40 runs in the first innings. Dravid batted at no. 3 position for the first time in the First Test of the three-match home series against South Africa in Ahmedabad in November 1996. He failed to perform well in the series, scoring only 175 runs at an average of 29.16.

Two weeks later, India toured South Africa for a three–match Test series. Chasing a target of 395 runs in the First Test, the Indian team got bowled out for 66 runs on the Durban pitch that provided excessive bounce and seam movement. Dravid, batting at no. 6, was the only Indian batsman to reach double figures in the innings, scoring 27 not out. He was promoted to the no. 3 slot again in the second innings of the Second Test. He almost won the Third Test for India with his maiden test hundred in the first innings, scoring 148 runs and another 81 runs in the second innings at Wanderers before the thunderstorms, dim light and Cullinan's hundred helped South Africa salvage a draw. Dravid's performance in this Test earned him his first Man of the Match award in Test cricket. He top scored for India in the series with 277 runs at an average of 55.40.

Dravid continued in the same vein in the West Indies, where he once again top scored for India in the five–match Test series, aggregating 360 runs at an average of 72.00, including four fifties. 92 runs scored in the first innings of the fifth match in Georgetown earned him a joint Man of the Match award along with Shivnarine Chanderpaul. With this series, Dravid concluded the 1996–97 Test season, topping the international runs chart with 852 runs from 12 matches at an average of 50.11, with six fifties and a hundred.

Dravid continued his successful run, scoring seven fifties in the next eight Tests that included fifties in six consecutive innings (three each against Sri Lanka and Australia), becoming only the second Indian to do so after Gundappa Vishwanath. By the end of 1997–98 Test season, he had scored 15 fifties in 22 Tests including four scores of nineties but just one hundred.

That changed in the ensuing 1998–99 Test season, when Dravid scored 752 runs in seven Tests at an average of 62.66, that included four hundreds and one fifty. In the process, he topped the runs chart for India for the season. He scored the first of the four hundreds during the Zimbabwe tour. Dravid top scored in both innings against Zimbabwe, scoring 118 and 44 runs respectively; however, could not prevent India's defeat in the one-off Test. This was to remain India's only defeat in tests when Dravid scored a hundred until 2011.

The Zimbabwe tour was followed by a tour to New Zealand. The First Test having been abandoned without a ball being bowled, the series started for Dravid with the first duck of his Test career in the first innings of the Second Test and ended with hundreds in both innings of the Third Test in Hamilton. He scored 190 and 103 not out in the first and the second innings respectively, becoming only the third Indian batsman, after Vijay Hazare and Sunil Gavaskar, to score a century in both innings of a Test match. Dravid topped the runs table for the series with 321 runs at an average of 107.00, although India lost the series 0–1.

Later that month, India played a two Test home series against Pakistan. Dravid didn't contribute much with the bat. India lost the First Test but won the Second Test in Delhi with Kumble's historic 10-wicket haul. Dravid played his part in the 10-wicket haul by taking a catch to dismiss Mushtaq Ahmed, who was Kumble's eighth victim in the innings. The India-Pakistan Test series was followed by the 1998–99 Asian Test Championship. India went on to lose the riot-affected First Test of the championship against Pakistan at the Eden Gardens. India went to Sri Lanka to play the Second Test of the championship. Dravid scored his fourth hundred of the season at Colombo in the first innings of the match. He also effected a successful run out of Russel Arnold during Sri Lankan innings fielding at short leg. On the fourth morning, Dravid was injured while fielding at the same position when the ball from Jayawardene's pull shot struck his face through the helmet grill. He didn't come out to bat in the second innings due to the injury. The match ended in a draw as India failed to qualify for the Finals of the championship.

In a stark contrast to his Test career, Dravid struggled to make a mark in the ODIs. Between his ODI debut in April 1996 and the end of 1998, Dravid regularly found himself in and out of the ODI team.

Dravid's first success in his ODI career came in the 1996 'Friendship' Cup against Pakistan in the tough conditions of Toronto. He emerged as the highest scorer of the series with 220 runs in five matches at an average of 44.00 and a strike rate of 68.53. He won his first ODI Man of the Match award for the 46 runs scored in the low scoring third game of the series. He top scored for India in the Standard Bank International One-Day Series 1996/97 in South Africa with 280 runs from eight games at an average of 35.00 and a strike rate of 60.73, the highlight being a Man of the Match award-winning performance (84 runs, one catch) in the Final of the series, although his team lost the match. He was the second highest run scorer for India in the four-match bilateral ODI series in the West Indies in the 1996–97 season with 121 runs at an average of 40.33 and a strike rate of 57.61. Dravid scored his first ODI hundred in the 1997 Pepsi Independence Cup against Pakistan in Chennai that came in a losing cause. Dravid top scored for India in the quadrangular event with 189 runs from three games at an average of 94.50 and a strike rate of 75.60. However, India failed to qualify for the Final of the series.

Dravid's achievements in the ODIs were dwarfed by his failures in the shorter format of the game. 14 runs from two games in the 1996 Pepsi Sharjah Cup; 20 runs from two innings in the Singer World Series; 65 runs from four innings in the 1997 'Friendship' Cup; 88 runs from four games in the 1998 Coca-Cola Triangular Series including a 22-ball five runs and a 21-ball one run innings, both against Bangladesh; 32 runs from four games in the 1998 'Friendship' Cup; a slew of such poor performances often forced him to the sidelines of the India ODI squad. By the end of 1998, Dravid had scored 1,709 runs in 65 ODIs at an underwhelming average of 31.64 with a poor strike rate of 63.48.

By now, Dravid had been branded as a Test specialist. While he continued a successful run in Test cricket, he struggled in the ODIs. He drew criticism for not being able to adjust his style of play to the needs of ODI cricket and his lack of attacking capability. Dravid subsequently increased his range of strokes and adapted his batting style to suit the requirements of ODI cricket. He learned to pace his innings cleverly without going for the slogs.

Dravid's ODI success began during the 1998–99 New Zealand tour. He scored a run-a-ball hundred in the first match of the bilateral ODI series that earned him his third Man of the Match award in ODIs. His team lost the match. However, his effort of 51 runs from 71 balls in the Fourth ODI resulted in India's victory and earned him his second Man of the Match award of the series. He became the top scorer of the series with 309 runs from five games at an average of 77.25 and a strike rate of 84.65. Dravid scored a hundred against Sri Lanka in the 1998/99 Pepsi Cup at Nagpur, scoring 116 of 118 deliveries. In the next match against Pakistan, he bowled four overs and took the wicket of Saeed Anwar. This was his first wicket in international cricket.

Dravid scored two fifties in the 1998–99 Coca-Cola Cup in Sharjah, one each against England and Pakistan. Standing-in as the substitute wicket-keeper in the third match of the series for Nayan Mongia, who was injured during keeping, Dravid effected two dismissals. He first stumped Graeme Hick off Sunil Joshi's bowling, who became Dravid's first victim as a wicket-keeper, and then caught Neil Fairbrother off Ajay Jadeja's bowling. He top scored for India in the tournament, though his last innings of the series was a golden duck against Pakistan in the Final.

=== World Cup debut ===
Dravid hit consecutive fifties in England against Leicestershire and Nottinghamshire in the warm-up games.

He made his World Cup debut against South Africa at Hove, scoring a half century. He scored only 13 runs in the next game against Zimbabwe. India lost both the games. Having lost the first two games, India needed to win the remaining three games of the first round to have any chance of advancing into the Super Six stage. Dravid set up a partnership with Sachin Tendulkar, during which they scored 237 runs against Kenya at Bristol – a World Cup record – and in the process hit his maiden World Cup hundred, leading India to a 94-run victory. India's designated keeper Nayan Mongia was injured and left the field at the end of the 9th over during Kenyan innings, forcing Dravid to keep the wickets for the rest of the innings. In the absence of Mongia, Dravid played his first ODI as a designated keeper against Sri Lanka at Taunton. Dravid once again set up a record breaking partnership of 318 runs, the first ever three hundred run partnership in ODI history, with Sourav Ganguly leading India to a 157-run win. Dravid scored 145 runs from 129 balls with 17 fours and a six, becoming the second batsman in World Cup history to hit back-to-back hundreds. Dravid scored a fifty in the last group match as India defeated England to advance to the Super Six stage. Dravid scored 2, 61, and 29 in the three Super Six matches against Australia, Pakistan & New Zealand respectively. India failed to qualify for the semi-finals, having lost to Australia and New Zealand. They achieved a consolation victory against Pakistan in a tense game that took place during the Kargil War in Kashmir. Dravid emerged as the top scorer of the tournament with 461 runs from 8 games at an average of 65.85 and a strike rate of 85.52.

Dravid's post-World Cup campaign started poorly with only 40 runs scored in 4 games during the Aiwa Cup in August 1999. He soon top-scored for India in two consecutive limited-overs series – the Singapore Challenge, the highlight being a hundred in the Final though he couldn't prevent his team's defeat, and the DMC Cup, the highlight being a match winning effort (77 runs, 4 catches) in the series decider for which he received a man-of-the-match award. Dravid topped the international runs chart for the 1999 cricket season across all formats, scoring 782 runs during 19 matches. By now, Dravid had started to keep wickets on an infrequent basis, with India fielding him as designated wicket-keeper in five out of 10 ODIs played in the three events.

Dravid began his post-World Cup Test season with a decent outing against New Zealand in the 3-match home series. His best effort during the series came in the second innings of the First test at Mohali, where he scored 144 runs, helping India salvage a draw after being bowled out for 83 runs in the First innings. This was Dravid's sixth test hundred and his first test hundred in India. Dravid was successful in the 3–2 series win against New Zealand during the bilateral ODI series, scoring 240 runs in 5 games at an average of 60 and a strike rate of 83.62, ending as the second highest scorer in the series. His career best effort in ODIs came in this series in the second game at Hyderabad where he scored run-a-ball 153 runs, which included fifteen fours and two sixes. He set up a 331-run partnership with Tendulkar, highest partnership in ODI cricket history at the time, a record they held for 15 years until it was broken in 2015. In 1999, Dravid scored 1,761 runs in 43 ODIs at an average of 46.34 and a strike rate of 75.16, including 6 hundreds and 8 fifties. He also featured in two 300+ run partnerships.

India toured Australia in December 1999 for a 3-match test series and a triangular ODI tournament. Although Dravid scored a hundred against Tasmania in the practice match, he underperformed with the bat in the Test series as India lost 0–3. He did reasonably well in the 1999–2000 Carlton & United Series, scoring 3 fifties in the triangular event. However, India failed to qualify for the Final of the tournament.

Dravid's poor form in Tests continued as India suffered a 0–2 whitewash against South Africa in a home series. He had moderate success in the bilateral ODI series against South Africa. He contributed to India's 3–2 series win with 208 runs at an average of 41.60, which included 2 fifties and three wickets at an average of 22.66, topping the bowling average chart for the series. His career best bowling figure of 2/43 from nine overs in the First ODI at Kochi was also the best bowling figure for any bowler in that match.

=== Rise through the ranks ===
In February 2000, Tendulkar's resignation from captaincy led to the promotion of Ganguly, the then-vice-captain, as the new captain of the Indian team. In May 2000, while Dravid was playing county cricket in England, he was appointed as the vice-captain of the Indian team for Asia cup.

India did well in the 2000 ICC KnockOut Trophy. The Indian team, marred by a match fixing controversy, defeated Kenya, Australia, and South Africa in consecutive matches to reach the Finals but India lost to New Zealand in the Finals. Dravid scored 157 runs in 4 matches of the tournament, at an average of 52.33, including 2 fifties. He also scored 85 runs in a match against Zimbabwe in the 2000–01 Coca-Cola Champions Trophy while opening the innings but was forced to miss the rest of the tournament because of an injury.

India kick started the new Test season with a 9-wicket win against Bangladesh. Dravid played a brisk knock of 41 runs from 49 balls, including five fours and a six, while chasing a target of 63 runs. The ensuing test series against Zimbabwe was John Wright's first assignment as Indian coach. Dravid, who had recently concluded a county stint with Kent, had interacted with and recognized Wright's potential, who was coaching Kent cricket team at the time and played a key role in recommendation and appointment of Wright as India's first foreign head coach. Dravid scored 200 not out in the first and 70 not out in the second innings of the First Test, guiding India to a 9-wicket victory against Zimbabwe. He scored 162 in the drawn Second test to end the series with an average of 432.00, the highest batting average by an Indian in a series across all formats (international and non-international).

Dravid captained the Indian team for the first time in the fifth match of the bilateral ODI series against Zimbabwe in the absence of Ganguly, who was serving suspension. With the help of Agarkar's all-round performance, Dravid led India to a 39-run victory in his maiden ODI as captain.

=== History at Eden ===
In February 2001, the Australian team toured India, touted by Steve Waugh as the 'Final Frontier' for his team that was on a 15-match winning streak. Dravid performed poorly in the first innings of the First Test but displayed strong resilience in the second innings. His 196-ball-long resistance finally ended when he got out bowled to Warne for 39 runs. Australians extended their winning streak to 16 Tests as they defeated India by 10 wickets inside three days.

During the Second Test at Eden Gardens, the Australians bowled India out for 171 runs in the first innings and enforced a follow-on after securing a lead of 274 runs. In the second innings, Laxman, who had scored a fifty in the first innings, was promoted to the no. 3 position which had been Dravid's usual spot, while Dravid, who had gotten bowled out to Warne for a second time in a row in the first innings for just 25 runs, was relegated to no. 6 position. When Dravid joined Laxman in the middle on the third day of the Test the scoreboard read 232/4, with India still needing 42 runs to avoid an innings defeat.

Dravid and Laxman played out the remaining time on the third day and the whole of the fourth day denying Australia any breakthrough. Eventually, Laxman got out on the fifth morning, bringing the 376-runs partnership to an end. Ganguly declared the innings at 657/7, setting Australia a target of 384 runs with 75 overs left in the match. India bowled Australia out for 212 runs in 68.3 overs winning the match by 171 runs. This was only the third instance of a team winning a Test after following-on, and India became the second team to do so.

Dravid scored 81 runs in the first innings of the Third Test and took 4 catches in the match as India defeated Australia at Chennai, winning the series 2–1. Dravid scored 80 runs in the first of the 5-match ODI series at his home ground as India won the match by 60 runs. He underperformed in the remaining 4 ODIs as Australia won the series 3–2. Dravid topped the averages for the 2000–01 Test season with 839 runs in six matches at an average of 104.87.

Dravid had a decent outing in Zimbabwe, scoring 137 runs from 134 balls in the First Tour game and aggregating 138 runs at an average of 69.00 from the drawn Test series. In the ensuing triangular ODI series, he aggregated 121 runs from 5 matches at an average of 40.33 and a strike rate of 101.68, the highlight being an unbeaten 72 off 64 balls, while chasing a target of 235 against Zimbabwe in the 3rd match of the series, leading India to a 4-wicket win with four balls to spare. He was adjudged man of the match.

On the next tour to Sri Lanka, India lost the first three matches of the triangular event. In the absence of the suspended Ganguly, Dravid captained the team in the 4th match leading them to their first victory of the series. India won the next two matches to qualify for the Final. Dravid played crucial innings in all three victories. Eventually, India lost the Final to Sri Lanka. He top scored for India in the series with 259 runs from seven matches at an average of 51.80 and a strike rate of 59.81. Reinstated to his usual no. 3 position in the absence of the injured Laxman, Dravid top scored for India in the ensuing 3-Test series as well with 235 runs at an average of 47.00. Dravid scored 75 runs in the fourth innings chase of the Second Test – a crucial contribution to India's first Test win in Sri Lanka since 1993, despite the absence of key players like Tendulkar, Laxman, Srinath and Kumble.

Dravid had decent success in Standard Bank tri-series on the South Africa tour, scoring 214 runs (including 3 fifties) at an average of 53.50 and a strike rate of 71.81. He also kept wickets in the final two ODIs of the series, effecting 3 stumpings. The highlight for Dravid in the ensuing Test series came in the second innings of the Second Test. India, having failed to last a hundred overs in any of the previous three innings in the series, needed to bat out four sessions in the Second Test to save the match. They started poorly, losing their first wicket in the first over itself. However, Dravid forged a partnership of 171 runs with Dasgupta that lasted for 83.2 overs, taking India to the brink of safety. Poor weather helped India salvage a draw as only 96.2 overs could be bowled in the innings. Dravid captained the team in the 'unofficial' Third test in the absence of injured Ganguly, which India lost by an innings margin.

By the end of the South African tour, Dravid had started experiencing problems with his right shoulder. Although he played the ensuing home test series against England, he pulled out of the six-match bilateral ODI series to undergo a shoulder rehabilitation program in South Africa. He returned for Zimbabwe's tour of India but performed below par, scoring a fifty each in the Test series and the bilateral ODI series.

=== 2002–2006: Peak years ===
Dravid hit the peak form of his career in 2002. Between the 2002 and the 2006 season, Dravid was the second-highest scorer overall and top scorer for India across formats, scoring 8,914 runs from 174 matches at an average of 54.02, including 19 hundreds.

Dravid had a successful outing in the West Indies in 2002. The highlights for him included hitting a hundred with a swollen jaw helping India avoid the follow-on at Georgetown in the drawn First Test, contributing with a fifty and four catches to India's victory in the Second Test at the Port of Spain – India's first Test victory in the West Indies since 1975–76 – and another fifty in the drawn Fourth Test with a wicket to boot, that of Ridley Jacobs who was batting on 118. This was Dravid's only wicket in Test cricket. He played as India's designated keeper in the ODI series but didn't contribute much with the bat in the 2–1 series win.

=== A quartet of hundreds ===
India's tour of England in 2002 started with a triangular ODI event involving India, England and Sri Lanka. India emerged as the winner of the series, defeating England in the Final – their first victory after nine consecutive defeats in one-day finals. Dravid played as designated keeper in six out of seven matches, effecting nine dismissals (6 catches, 3 stumpings) – the most by a keeper in the series. He also performed well with the bat, aggregating 245 runs at an average of 49.00, including three fifties. His performance against Sri Lanka in the fourth ODI (64 runs, 1 catch) earned him a man of the match award.

India lost the first of the four match Test series. Having conceded a 260 runs lead in the first innings of the Second Test at Nottingham, the Indian team was in a spot of bother. However, Dravid led the fightback in the second innings with a hundred as the Indian team managed to earn a draw.

Ganguly won the toss in the Third Test and decided to bat first on an overcast morning at Headingley, on a pitch known to be traditionally conducive for fast and swing bowling. Having lost an early wicket, Dravid weathered the storm in the company of Sanjay Bangar. They played cautiously, taking body blows on a pitch with uneven bounce. Dravid completed his second hundred of the series in the process. The Indian team declared the innings on 628/8 and then bowled England out twice to register their first test victory in England since 1986. Despite being outscored by Tendulkar, Dravid was named man of the match for his heroic efforts on the first day in adverse conditions. Dravid scored a double hundred in the drawn Fourth Test and earned his second consecutive man of the match award of the series. Christopher Martin-Jenkins noted during the Fourth Test:

If a Martian were to land on Earth now and be told that the best batsman in the world was playing in this match, he would think it was Rahul Dravid and not Sachin Tendulkar.

Dravid aggregated 602 runs in the series from four matches at an average of 100.33, including three hundreds and a fifty, and was adjudged joint man of the series along with Michael Vaughan.

India jointly shared the 2002 ICC Champions Trophy with Sri Lanka. Dravid contributed to India's successful campaign with 120 runs at an average of 60.00 and five dismissals behind the wicket. Dravid scored a hundred in the First Test of the three match home series against the West Indies, becoming the first Indian batsman to score hundreds in four consecutive Test innings, but had to retire soon after owing to severe cramps. Dravid performed well in the subsequent bilateral 7-match ODI series aggregating 300 runs at an average of 75.00 and a strike rate of 89.82, including a hundred and two fifties. He also effected 7 dismissals (6 catches, 1 stumping) in the series. India was trailing 1–2 and needed 325 runs to win the Fourth ODI and level the series. Dravid scored a hundred, leading India to a successful chase. He once again scored a crucial fifty in the Sixth ODI as India once again leveled the series after trailing 2–3. India, however, lost the last match to lose the series 3–4.

Dravid top scored for India in the two-match Test series in New Zealand as India slumped to a whitewash. He played as designated keeper in six of the 7-match bilateral ODI series and effected seven dismissals but fared poorly with the bat as India was handed a 2–5 drubbing by New Zealand.

=== 2003 Cricket World Cup ===
Dravid arrived in South Africa with the Indian squad to participate in the 2003 Cricket World Cup in the capacity of first-choice keeper-batsman as part of their seven batsmen-four bowlers strategy – an experiment that had brought success to the team during the prior year. The idea was that making Dravid keep wickets allowed India to accommodate an extra specialist batsman. The strategy worked well for India in the World Cup. India recovered from a less than convincing victory against the Netherlands and a loss to Australia in the league stage, winning eight consecutive matches to qualify for the World Cup Finals for the first time since 1983. India eventually lost the Final to Australia, finishing as runner-up in the tournament. Dravid contributed to India's campaign with 318 runs at an average of 63.60 and 16 dismissals (15 catches, 1 stumping). Highlights for Dravid in the tournament included a fifty against England, 44 not out against Pakistan in a successful chase, and an undefeated fifty in another successful chase against New Zealand.

Dravid topped the international runs chart for the 2003–04 cricket season across formats, aggregating 1,993 runs from 31 matches at an average of 64.29, including three double hundreds. The first match involved India and New Zealand, in the first of the two-test home series at Ahmedabad. Dravid scored 222 runs in the first innings and 73 runs in the second innings, receiving a man of the match award for his efforts. Dravid captained the Indian Test Team for the first time in the second game of the series at Mohali in the absence of Ganguly. Both matches ended in draws. Dravid top scored in the series with 313 runs at an average of 78.25. India next participated in the TVS cup alongside New Zealand and Australia. India lost to Australia in the Final. Dravid scored two fifties in the series but the highlight was his fifty against New Zealand in the ninth match that came in just 22 balls – the second fastest fifty by an Indian.

=== Adelaide: An Eden encore ===
"Rahul batted like God".

— Sourav Ganguly, after Indian victory in the Adelaide Test.

After earning a draw in the first of the four-match Test series in Australia, the Indian team found itself reeling at 85/4 in the Second Test at Adelaide, after Australia had piled 556 runs in the first innings when Laxman joined Dravid in the middle. They batted for 93.5 overs, bringing about their second 300-run partnership, adding 303 runs together before Laxman perished for 148 runs. However, Dravid continued to complete his second double hundred of the season. He was the last man out for 233 runs as India conceded a marginal first innings lead of 33 runs to Australia. India bowled Australia out for a score of only 196, with the help of Agarkar's six-wicket haul, and were set a target of 230 runs to win the match. Dravid scored an unbeaten 72 in the chase as India registered their first test victory in Australia in 23 years since the 1980–81 season. This was the first time that Australians went behind in a home series since 1994. Dravid won the man of the match award for his efforts. His effort in the match was adjudged as the best individual Border-Gavaskar Trophy performance by an Indian in Australia since 2000 through popular voting He scored two nineties in the next two tests, as Australia leveled the series to 1–1. Dravid top scored for India in the series with 619 runs at an average of 123.80 and was awarded player of the series for his efforts.

Dravid performed moderately well in the ensuing VB series with three fifties in the league stage, all of which came in winning cause. However, India lost the best-of-three finals to Australia 2–0. A controversy erupted during the series when Dravid was found guilty of ball tampering during an ODI with Zimbabwe at Gabba and fined half of his match fee. Match referee Clive Lloyd adjudged the application of an energy sweet to the ball as a deliberate offence, although Dravid himself claimed it to be accidental when questioned by the media but denied further comments as he was bound to ICC regulations. Captain Ganguly stated that everybody knew it was an accident and the fine would have been bigger had it been deliberate. However, Lloyd maintained that Dravid was spared of heftier fine because of his unblemished record in the past and that India could say it was accidental but television footage showed Dravid applying something on the ball and players are not allowed to do that. According to the ICC's Code of Conduct, players could only apply sweat and saliva to the ball. It was reported that the team and Dravid in particular were deeply upset that his integrity was brought under question. Coach Wright defended Dravid, stating it as 'an innocent mistake'. Wright explained that Dravid had been shining the ball with saliva when part of a sweet he had been chewing stuck to the ball and he tried to wipe it off when he saw it. He further defended Dravid stating that he is a man of great integrity and a "credit to cricket".

India visited Pakistan in March 2004 to participate in a bilateral Test series for the first time since the 1989–90 season. Prior to the Test series, India played and won the 5-match ODI series 3–2. Dravid top scored for India in the series with 248 runs at an average of 62.00 and a strike rate of 73.59, and effected four dismissals (3 catches, 1 stumping). His contributions included 99 runs in the First ODI and a fifty during a successful chase in the Fourth ODI.

Dravid captained India in the first two of the ensuing three-match test series in the absence of Ganguly, who was injured, and led India to their first-ever Test victory in Pakistan. In only his second test as the team's captain, Dravid took a controversial decision during the First Test at Multan, declaring Indian innings at the fall of the fifth wicket, with the scoreboard reading 675/5 and Tendulkar unbeaten at 194, just six runs shy of a double hundred. He wanted to bowl a certain number of overs and take a shot at the exhausted Pakistani batsmen, who had been on the field for 150+ overs, in the final hour of the second day's play. While some praised the "team-before-personal-milestones" approach of the Indian captain, others criticized Dravid's timing of declaration as there were no pressing concerns and there was ample time left in the match to try to bowl Pakistan out twice. While Tendulkar was admittedly disappointed, both he and Dravid and the team's management denied any rumours of a rift between them, and claimed that the matter had been discussed and sorted amicably behind closed doors. India eventually went on to win the match by an innings margin. Pakistan leveled the series, defeating India in the Second Test. Dravid scored a double hundred in the Third Test at Rawalpindi – his third double hundred of the season. He scored 270 runs – his career best performance – before perishing to a reverse sweep, trying to force the pace. India went on to win the match and the series – their first series victory outside India since 1993 and first ever in Pakistan. Dravid was adjudged man of the match for his effort. He topped the international averages for 2003–04 Test season with 1,241 runs from nine tests at an average of 95.46.

India ended as runners-up in the 2004 Asia Cup. Dravid contributed to the campaign with a hundred against the U.A.E., which earned him a man of the match award, a fifty against Sri Lanka and five dismissals behind the wicket. He did not make any significant contribution with the bat in the ensuing Videocon Cup, but scored a fifty in the 3-match bilateral ODI series in England and top scored for India in the failed campaign at the 2004 ICC Champions Trophy.

Dravid did not perform well in the ensuing Border-Gavaskar Trophy at home, scoring only one fifty in four matches. He led India in the Third and the Fourth Test of the series in the absence of regular captain Ganguly amid some speculations. While India lost the Third Test and with it the series, he led the team to a consolation win in the Fourth Test with his spirited leadership and some critical decision making including promotion of Laxman up the batting order and bowling Kartik before Kumble. He contributed 181 runs including two fifties to India's 1–0 victory in the 2-match home test series against South Africa. He topped the series average charts with an average of 90.5. Sandwiched between the two test series, India played a solitary ODI against Pakistan at home to mark the 75th anniversary of the Board of Control for Cricket in India. The match turned out to be Dravid's last ODI as a designated wicket keeper. In all, Dravid effected 84 dismissals (71 catches, 13 stumpings) in 73 matches as India's designated keeper and 2 dismissals (1 catch, 1 stumping) as substitute keeper, totaling to 86 dismissals behind the wicket in ODIs which is the fourth best among Indian keepers. Dravid had a good outing on Bangladesh tour, where he scored a hundred in the Test series and two fifties in the ODI series, with India winning both the series.

In 2005, Dravid represented Asia XI against the ICC World XI at the World Cricket Tsunami Appeal. He top scored for Asia XI with a fifty but could not take his team to victory. Pakistan visited India in March 2005 for bilateral a Test and ODI series. Dravid scored a fifty in the First drawn test. He scored a hundred in each innings of the second test (110 in First innings and 135 in Second innings) at Eden Gardens, becoming only the second Indian to have scored a hundred in each innings of a test on two or more occasions. India won the test and Dravid earned man of the match award for his performance. He didn't fare well in the Third Test as India lost to draw the series 1–1. At the end of the series, Dravid's test average stood at 57.86 which was highest among the contemporary batsmen. Dravid topped the runs chart in the 6-match ODI series with 308 runs at an average of 51.33 and a strike rate of 80.00, including a hundred and two fifties. He also captained the team in the final two ODIs in the absence of Ganguly. India lost both the games to go down in the series 2–4.

Dravid led India in the Indian Oil Cup 2005 in the absence of suspended Ganguly. This was the first time he was appointed as captain for a full tournament. Dravid scored three fifties in the tri-series including a man of the match award-winning effort in Second match against the West Indies and a fifty against Sri Lanka in the Final. He top scored for India in the Final but could not guide the team to victory as India ended as runner up in the series.

Dravid fared poorly in the ODI tri-series on Zimbabwe tour but top scored in the two match test series with 175 runs at an average of 87.5 including two fifties as India whitewashed Zimbabwe 2–0. This was India's first test series victory outside Indian subcontinent since 1986.

Dravid went to Australia in October 2005 as part of the ICC World XI but fared poorly as Australia made short work of the touring party beating them convincingly in all the matches including three ODIs and one Test.

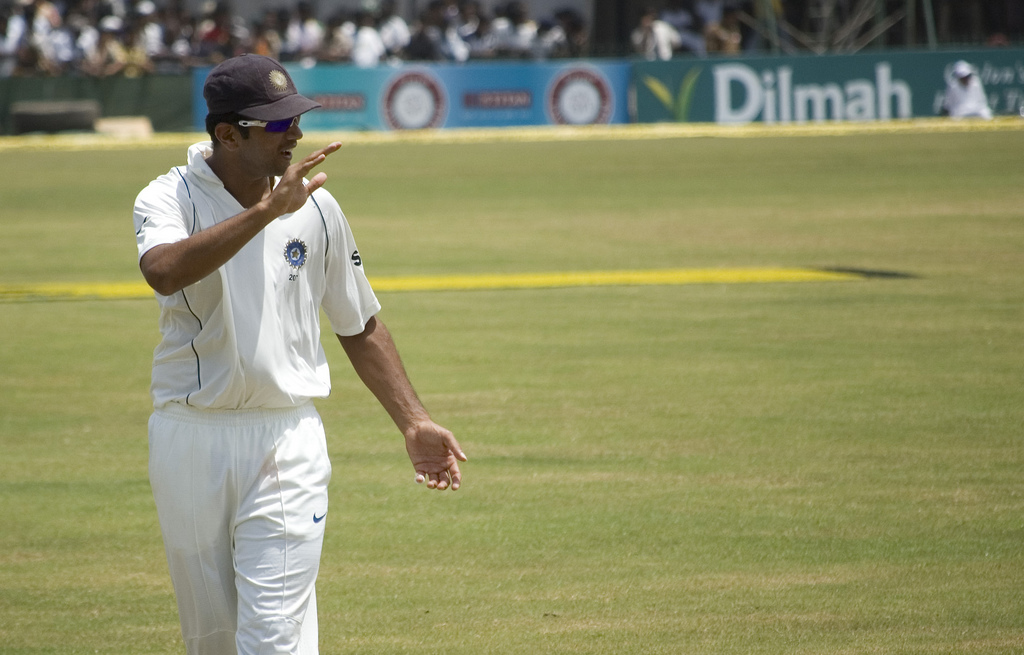
Dravid fielding during a Test match against Sri Lanka in Galle in 2008.

=== Captaincy ===
On 13 October 2005, Dravid was appointed as captain for the two forthcoming ODI series at home against Sri Lanka and South Africa, a total of 12 ODIs, amid speculations regarding selectors' future plans for an injured Ganguly. Dravid scored 312 runs at an average of 156 and a strike rate of 91.22 including two fifties and a hundred and led India to a 6–1 victory against Sri Lanka. His fifty in the first match of the series earned him a man of the match award. The series against South Africa ended in a 2–2 draw. Dravid scored a man of the match award-winning unbeaten fifty in the last match of the series guiding India to a series levelling victory.

On 22 November 2005, Dravid was appointed captain for the forthcoming home test series against Sri Lanka. In his first full series as Test captain, Dravid had modest returns from the bat. India won the series 2–0. Dravid had to sit out of the Third test due to gastroenteritis. This was the first time Dravid missed a test since making his debut in June 1996, having appeared in 94 consecutive tests since debut (93 for India, one for ICC World XI) – a record for any player in Test cricket history at the time.

In his first away tour as India's full time captain, Dravid did well with the bat scoring 241 runs (including two hundreds) at an average of 80.33 in the 3-match test series and 205 runs (including three fifties) at an average of 41 and a strike rate of 75.64 in the 5-match ODI series. Dravid had promoted himself to the opening position for the test series for the sake of team's balance, and even forged a record 410 run partnership with Sehwag in the First test but could not prevent India from losing the test series 0–1 to Pakistan however, he did manage to lead his team to a 4–1 victory in ODI series.

India drew the ensuing home test series against England 1–1. India went into the third test, which was incidentally Dravid's 100th, with a 1–0 lead but England spoilt the party bowling India out for a paltry 100 in the fourth innings. Dravid top scored in the test series with 309 runs (including three fifties) at an average of 61.80. India won the ODI series 5–1 under Dravid's leadership who had a decent outing with the bat scoring 219 runs (including two fifties) at an average of 43.80 and a strike rate of 77.11. India drew the ensuing 2 match ODI series against Pakistan in UAE. Dravid top scored for India in the series with 112 runs at an average of 56.00 and a strike rate of 77.24. His innings of 92 in the second match helped India level the series after trailing 0–1 and earned him a man of the match award.

India next toured to West Indies in May 2006. They won the first of the 5-match ODI series by 5-wickets with the captain leading from the front with a man of the match award-winning hundred. This was India's 17th consecutive victory while chasing in ODIs – a world record. 14 of those wins had come with Dravid at the helm. The streak finally broke in the Second ODI of the series when India lost to West Indies by 1 run. India went on to lose the series 1–4. The two teams drew the first three tests of the series but India won the final test to win the series 1–0. Dravid led from the front scoring twin fifties (81 and 68) on a difficult pitch in the low scoring final test leading India to a series victory in the Caribbean, thus becoming the first captain from an Asian country in 35 years to win a series in West Indies. He was adjudged man of the match for his effort as well as man of the series for top scoring with 496 runs at an average of 82.66 including one hundred and four fifties.

=== 2007-2010: Decline ===
The next four years saw a relative decline in Dravid's batting form as he scored 4242 runs from 92 matches at an average of 37.87 (including 8 hundreds and 24 fifties) between 2007 and 2010 - a period that also witnessed his eviction from India's ODI setup.

India's next outing was supposed to be a triangular ODI series in Sri Lanka which was reduced to a three match bilateral series between India and Sri Lanka after South African team returned citing security concerns. However, only 11 runs could be scored in the series with nine of them coming out of Dravid's bat as rain washed out all the games. Dravid fared poorly with the bat in the ensuing DLF Cup but top scored for India in the ICC Champions Trophy as India failed to qualify for the Finals in both the tournaments.

On the ensuing tour to South Africa, Dravid missed two ODIs because of finger injury as South Africa won the five match series 4–0. He also had to miss the Only T20I. Dravid returned to lead India in the test series becoming the first Indian captain to win a test in South Africa as India won the First Test. India eventually went on to lose the series 1–2. Dravid had a poor outing with the bat as he could score just one fifty across five games (two ODIs and three Tests) on the tour, though he did contribute with a doughty 32 in India's winning cause in the First Test.

Dravid led from the front scoring three fifties in 4-match ODI series at home against West Indies guiding his team to 3–1 victory. He top scored for India with 211 runs at an average of 70.33 and a strike rate of 86.12. He subsequently led his team to a 2–1 victory in another 4-match ODI home series against Sri Lanka. He did not do much with the bat in the series scoring one fifty in the third match of the series. Dravid completed 10,000 runs in ODIs during the course of that inning becoming only the sixth batsman to do so.

India entered the 2007 World Cup in West Indies under Dravid's leadership with confidence but suffered a shock defeat to Bangladesh in the opening game, derailing their campaign and leading to unrest back home. Fans burnt effigies of captain Dravid and coach Chappell and pelted stones at Dhoni's under-construction house. India handed a crushing defeat to Bermuda in the next game but suffered defeat against Sri Lanka to crash out of the World Cup from the group stage - their worst World Cup performance since 1979. From his own batting perspective, Dravid didn't contribute much scoring just one fifty in the tournament. India's first round exit resulted in a lot of criticism from various sections including fans, politicians, media and former players. Sunil Gavaskar put a question mark on Greg Chappell's future as the coach however backed Dravid's position as the captain. On whether he will continue as captain, Dravid stated that it's not his decision to make, while taking full responsibility for his team's exit. "I was appointed captain till the World Cup. So I am not even the captain at this point of time", stated Dravid.

After the World cup debacle, Dravid's first assignment was to lead the team on Bangladesh tour. India won the 3-match ODI series 2-0 and won the 2-match test series 1–0. Dravid refused to be too excited about the victories stating that, "You can't look at something else to salvage something else (the World Cup debacle)." Dravid contributed to the successful campaign with 64 runs in the ODI series at an average of 64.00 and a strike rate of 74.41 and 192 runs in the test series at an average of 64.00 (including one hundred and one fifty).

Dravid's next assignment as Indian captain was the 2007 tour of Ireland, England & Scotland. India had travelled on the two and a half month long tour without a coach. On the Ireland leg of the tour, Dravid led India to victory in the Only ODI against Ireland and a 2–1 victory in a 3-match ODI series against South Africa. Dravid contributed one fifty to the team's cause in the series against South Africa. On England leg of the tour, India played a 3-match test series against England. Dravid led India to a historic series victory in England after a gap of 21 years. India won the second test and drew the first and third to win the series 1–0. While there was some criticism directed towards Dravid for safety first approach in the third test and not pressing for a victory from a dominant position, first by not enforcing a follow-on and later by his own slow batting in the third innings (12 runs of 96 balls), Dravid himself defended the decision citing work load management for his bowlers and was supported by his English counterpart Vaughn who accepted that he'd have done the same thing had he been in Dravid's place. Dravid's own contribution to the series victory with his bat was minimal as he scored just one fifty in three tests. India beat Scotland in the only ODI on the Scotland leg of the tour before returning to England for a closely fought 7-match ODI series that India lost 3–4. Dravid scored two fifties in the series, the highlight being 92 not out from 63 balls in the Second ODI earning him a man of the match award. Another fifty in the third ODI helped him climb to his career best ranking of fifth spot in ICC ODI Batting Ranking in August 2007.

India was slated to participate in the inaugural T20 World Cup in September 2007. Dravid opted out of the world cup and convinced other seniors like Tendulkar and Ganguly to skip the tournamanet too. Dravid called Dilip Vengsarkar, the chairman of selectors, to that effect, suggesting that youngsters should be sent to participate in the T20 World cup. The decision to skip the tournament was also driven by the fact that the seniors were fatigued after a long English tour and didn't want to extend their schedule for a new and unproven format. While India was in initial stage of its world cup campaign, back home, Dravid met BCCI President Sharad Pawar on September 13 to inform him about his decision to resign from India's captaincy. "There is a shelf life to captaincy in India in which you can give it your best", said Dravid, while stating that he was not enjoying the responsibility anymore. Dhoni, who was leading the team in the T20 World Cup at the time, was named Dravid's successor as India's white ball captain while Anil Kumble succeeded Dravid as India captain in test cricket.

Dravid's first international assignment after relinquishing captaincy was a 7-match ODI series against Australia at home. Dravid struggled in the series with just 51 runs in 5 innings and was left out of the playing XI for the last match of the series. This was the first time that Dravid had been left out of the ODI team since 1998, though the newly appointed captain of team India claimed with a smile that he had only been 'rested'. He was subsequently dropped from the squad for the ensuing ODI series against Pakistan with chief selector Vengsarkar again reiterating that he has been rested and he will be back soon provided he shows fitness and fielding playing for his domestic team. Many ex-cricketers voiced support for Dravid stating that it seemed unfair to drop a player of Dravid's calibre after failure in few innings.

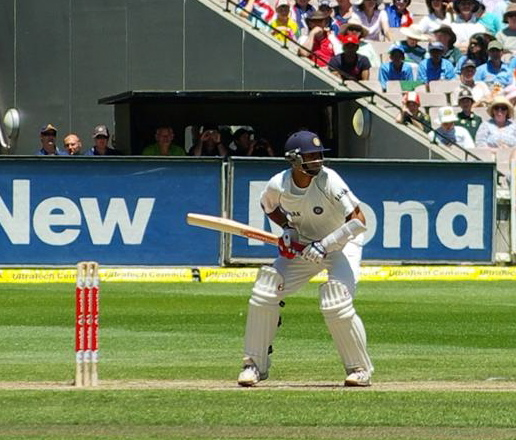
Dravid batting against Australia at the MCG

=== 2011 Tour of England ===
Having regained his form on the tour to the West Indies, where he scored a match-winning hundred in Sabina park, Jamaica, Dravid then toured England in what was billed as the series that would decide the World No. 1 ranking in tests. In the first test at Lord's, in reply to England's 474, Dravid scored an undefeated 103, his first hundred at the ground where he debuted in 1996. He received scant support from his teammates as India's team was bowled out for 286 and lost the test. The second test at Trentbridge in Nottingham again saw Dravid in successful form. Sent out to open the batting in place of an injured Gautam Gambhir, he scored his second successive hundred. His score of 117 again did not secure the team's victory, as a collapse of 6 wickets for 21 runs in the first innings led to a defeat by 319 runs. Dravid failed in both innings in the third test at Birmingham, as India lost by an innings and 242 runs, one of the heaviest defeats in their history. However, during the fourth and final match at The Oval, he opened the batting in place of Gambhir, and scored an undefeated 146 out of India's total of 300, carrying his bat through the innings. Once again, though, his efforts were in vain as India lost the match in a 0–4 whitewash. In total, he scored 461 runs in the four matches at an average of 76.83 with three hundreds. He accounted for over 26% of India's runs in the series and was named India's man of the series by English coach Andy Flower. Dravid's performance in the series was met with admiration.

== Retirement ==
Rahul Dravid was dropped from the ODI team in 2009, but was selected again for an ODI series in England in 2011, surprising even Dravid himself since, although he had not officially retired from ODI cricket, he had not expected to be recalled. After being selected, he announced that he would retire from ODI cricket after the series. He played his last ODI innings against England at Sophia Gardens, Cardiff, on 16 September 2011, scoring 69 runs from 79 balls before being bowled by Graeme Swann. His last limited-overs international match was his debut T20I match; he announced his retirement before playing his first T20I match.

My approach to cricket has been reasonably simple: it was about giving everything to the team, it was about playing with dignity, and it was about upholding the spirit of the game. I hope I have done some of that. I have failed at times, but I have never stopped trying. It is why I leave with sadness but also with pride.

— Dravid, at his retirement speech, March 2012

Dravid announced his retirement from Test and domestic cricket on 9 March 2012, after the 2011–12 tour of Australia, but he said that he would captain the Rajasthan Royals in the 2012 Indian Premier League. He was the second-highest run scorer and had taken the highest number of catches in Test cricket at the time of his retirement.

In July 2014, he played for the MCC team in the Bicentenary Celebration match at Lord's.

== Coaching ==
Towards the end of his playing career, Dravid took on a role as mentor to the Rajasthan Royals' IPL team in 2014. During this time, he also became involved with the Indian national team, serving as mentor during the team's tour of England in 2014. After leading the Royals to a third-place finish in the 2015 IPL season, he was appointed as the head coach of the India U-19 and India A teams. Dravid achieved success as coach, with the U-19s reaching the finals of the 2016 U-19 Cricket World Cup. Two years later, the team went on to win the 2018 U-19 Cricket World Cup, defeating Australia by 8 wickets to win their fourth Under-19 World Cup, the most by any national team. Dravid was credited with training future national team players including Rishabh Pant, Ishan Kishan and Washington Sundar. Alongside his coaching roles, Dravid took on several mentor roles, including at the Delhi Daredevils IPL team.

In July 2019, following his four-year stint as coach of the junior teams, Dravid was appointed Head of Cricket at the National Cricket Academy (NCA). He was in charge of "overseeing all cricket related activities at NCA was involved in mentoring, coaching, training and motivating players, coaches and support staff at the NCA". As head of NCA, he was praised for maintaining the senior team and revamping player fitness and rehabilitation regiments.

In November 2021, he was appointed as head coach of the Indian national cricket team.

== County stint ==
Dravid had always been keen on further honing his batting skills in testing English conditions by playing in county cricket. He had discussed the prospects regarding the same with former New Zealand cricketer and incumbent Kent coach John Wright during India's 1998–99 tour of New Zealand. Wright was particularly impressed with Dravid's performance on that tour, especially with his twin hundreds at Hamilton. The talks finally materialized and Dravid made his county debut for Kent in April 2000. His co-debutant Ganguly made his county debuted in the same match, albeit for the opposite team.

Kent's offer had come as a welcome change for Dravid. There was too much negativity surrounding Indian cricket marred by the match fixing controversy. Dravid himself had been struggling to score runs in Tests for a while. The county stint gave him a chance to "get away to a new environment" and "relax". The wide variety of pitches and weather conditions in England and a full season of intense county cricket against professional cricketers gave him a chance to further his cricketing training.

In his 2nd game for Kent, Dravid scored a 182 runs, propelling them to an innings and a 163-runs victory over the touring Zimbabwe team. Out of 7 first class tour games that Zimbabwe played on that tour, Kent was the only team that defeated them. Dravid hit another fifty runs in a draw against Surrey. The newly appointed vice-captain had to leave the county championship temporarily, missing two championship games and two one-day games, to fulfill his national commitment. The Indian team, Dravid included, fared poorly in the Asia Cup and failed to qualify for the Final. Subsequently, Dravid returned to England to resume his county sojourn with Kent.

In July 2000, Kent's away match against Hampshire at Portsmouth was billed as a showdown between two great cricketers – Warne and Dravid. Dravid came out on top. On a dustbowl, tailor-made to suit home team spinners, Warne took 4 wickets but could not take Dravid's. Coming in to bat at 15/2, Dravid faced 295 balls, scoring 137 runs – his maiden hundred in county championships. Dravid scored 73 not out in the second innings, leading Kent to a six wicket victory as Warne went wicketless.

In their last county game of the season, Kent needed one bonus point to prevent themselves from being relegated to the Second Division. Dravid made sure they stayed put in the First Division by winning the necessary bonus point with an inning of 77 runs.

Dravid concluded a successful stint with Kent, aggregating 1,221 runs from 16 first-class matches (15 county games and 1 tour game against Zimbabwe) at an average of 55.50, including 2 hundreds and 8 fifties. He shouldered Kent's batting single-handedly as the second best Kent batsman. Dravid contributed to Kent's county campaign not only with the bat but also with his fielding and bowling, taking 14 catches and 4 wickets at an average of 32.00.

== Indian Premier League and Champions League ==
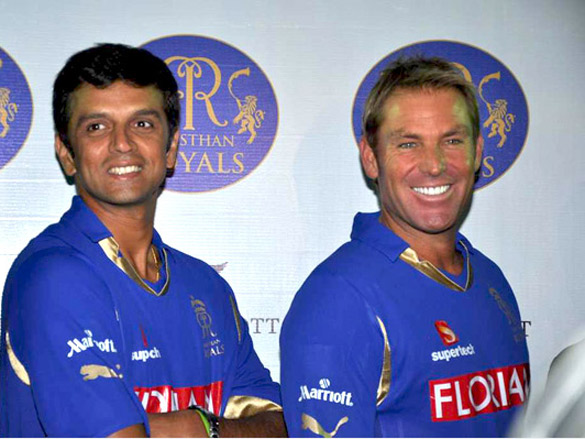
Dravid with RR teammate Shane Warne

RS Dravid's record in Twenty20 matches
League	Matches	Runs	HS	100s	50s	Avg.
T20I	1	31	31	0	0	31.00
IPL	89	2174	75*	0	11	28.23
CLT20	15	282	71	0	1	23.50

Rahul Dravid played for Royal Challengers Bangalore in IPL 2008, 2009 and 2010. Later he played for the Rajasthan Royals and led them to the finals of Champions League T20 in 2013, and play-offs of the Indian Premier League in 2013. Dravid announced retirement from Twenty20 after playing the 2013 Champions League Twenty20 in September–October 2013.

== Playing style, stats and records ==
Dravid is known for his technique, and has been one of the most successful batsmen of the Indian cricket team. Early in his career, he was known as a defensive batsman who was best at playing Test cricket, and was dropped from the ODI squad due to a low strike rate. However, he later improved his ability to score well in ODIs, earning him the ICC Player of the Year award. His nickname of 'The Wall' in Reebok advertisements is now used as his nickname. Dravid scored 36 centuries in Test cricket, with an average of 52.31 and this included five double centuries. In one-dayers, he averaged 39.16, with a strike rate of 71.23. He was one of the few Indians whose Test average was better while playing away than at home. Dravid's Test average abroad was 53.05, while his Test average at home was 51.35. His ODI average abroad was 37.93 and his ODI average at home was 43.11. Dravid averaged 65.78 in Indian Test victories and 50.69 in ODIs.

You cannot give him any bad balls or anything to get off strike... just pressure him early in the right spot. He is not like the other guys who love scoring off every ball, and there is no real weakness in his game either. He is mentally strong. You have just got to bowl well to him early on because he gets himself really set for a big innings once he is in.

— Glenn McGrath on how to approach Dravid, while speaking to The Daily Telegraph, December 2003

Dravid's sole Test wicket was of Ridley Jacobs in the fourth Test match against the West Indies during the 2001–2002 series. Dravid often kept wickets for India in ODIs.

Dravid was involved in two of the largest partnerships in ODIs: a 318-run partnership with Sourav Ganguly, the first pair to combine for a 300-run partnership, and a 331-run partnership with Sachin Tendulkar, which is a world record. He also holds the record for the greatest number of innings played since debut before being dismissed for a duck. His highest scores in ODIs and Tests are 153 and 270, respectively.

An innings-by-innings breakdown of Dravid's Test match batting career, showing runs scored (red bars with purple bars for not out) and the average of the last ten innings (blue line).

He was named one of the Wisden Cricketers of the Year in 2000. Though primarily a defensive batsman, Dravid scored 50 runs not out in 22 balls (a strike rate of 227.27) against New Zealand in Hyderabad on 15 November 2003, the second fastest 50 among Indian batsmen.

In 2004, Dravid was awarded the Padma Shri by the Government of India. On 7 September 2004, he was awarded the inaugural Player of the year award and the Test player of the year award by the International Cricket Council (ICC).

Indian people love to give their cricket heroes a nickname. As these things go, Rahul Dravid being known as 'The Wall' is pretty much spot on. 'The fortress' could also describe Rahul. Because once, Dravid was set, you needed the bowling equivalent of a dozen cannon firing all at once to blast him down.

— Legendary Australian spinner Shane Warne, December 2008

After reaching the 10,000 Test runs milestone, he said, "It's a proud moment for sure. For me, growing up, I dreamt of playing for India. When I look back, I probably exceeded my expectations with what I have done over the last 10 to 12 years. I never had an ambition to do it because I never believed – it is just a reflection of my longevity in the game."

Dravid is also one of only two batsmen to score 10,000 runs at a single batting position and is the fourth highest run scorer in Test cricket, behind Tendulkar, Ponting and Kallis.

== Achievements and awards ==
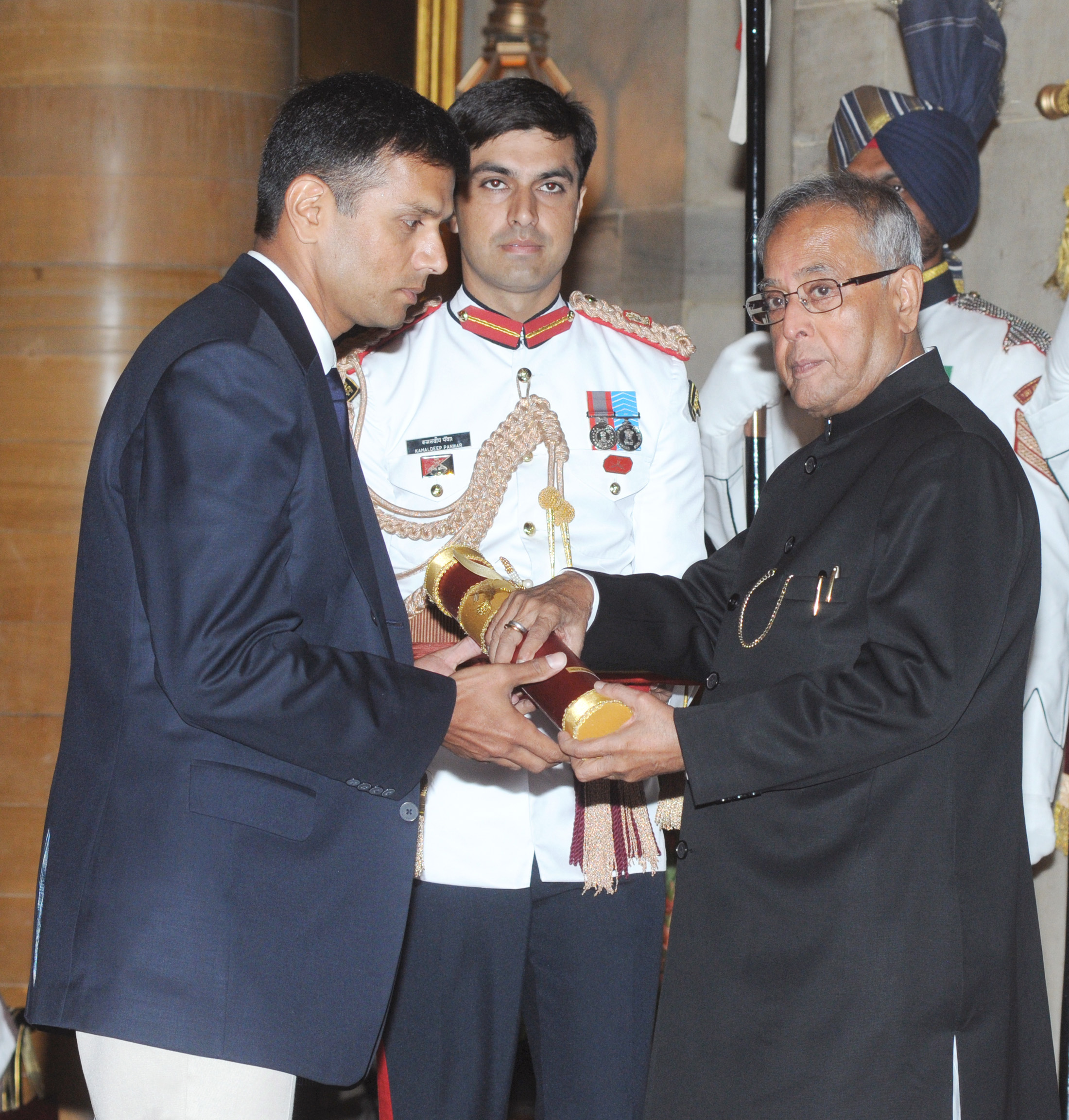
President Pranab Mukherjee presenting the Padma Bhushan to Dravid, c. 2013.

=== National honours ===
- 1998 – Arjuna Award recipient for achievements in cricket
- 2004 – Padma Shri – India's fourth highest civilian award
- 2013 – Padma Bhushan – India's third highest civilian award

=== Other honours ===
- 1999 – CEAT International Cricketer of the World Cup
- 2000 – Dravid was one of the five cricketers selected as Wisden Cricketer of the Year.
- 2004 – ICC Cricketer of the year – Highest award in the ICC listings
- 2004 – ICC Test Player of The Year, ICC Cricketer of The Year
- 2004 – MTV Youth Icon of the Year
- 2006 – Captain of the ICC's Test Team
- 2011 – NDTV Indian of the Year's Lifetime Achievement Award with Dev Anand
- 2012 – Don Bradman Award with Glenn McGrath
- 2015 – Wisden India's Highest Impact Test Batsman
- 2018 – ICC Hall of Fame
- 2026 - BCCI Lifetime Achievement Honour

== Personal life ==
=== Family ===
On 4 May 2003, Dravid married Vijeta Pendharkar, a surgeon from Nagpur. They have two children: Samit, born in 2005, and Anvay, born in 2009.

=== Social commitments ===
- Children's Movement for Civic Awareness (CMCA)
- UNICEF Supporter and AIDS Awareness Campaign

== Biographies ==
=== Books ===
Four biographies have been written on Rahul Dravid and his career:

- Rahul Dravid – A Biography written by Vedam Jaishankar (ISBN 978-81-7476-481-2). Publisher: UBSPD Publications. Date: January 2004
- The Nice Guy Who Finished First written by Devendra Prabhudesai. Publisher: Rupa Publications. Date: November 2005
- A collection of articles, testimonials and interviews related to Dravid was released by ESPNcricinfo following his retirement. The book was titled Rahul Dravid: Timeless Steel.

Preceded by Sourav Ganguly	Indian Test captains 2005–2007	Succeeded by Anil Kumble
Preceded by Sourav Ganguly	Indian One-Day captains 2005–2007	Succeeded by Mahendra Singh Dhoni
Preceded by First	Sir Garfield Sobers Trophy; 2004	Succeeded by Andrew Flintoff & Jacques Kallis
Preceded by Position started	Royal Challengers Bangalore captain 2008	Succeeded by Kevin Pietersen
Preceded by Shane Warne	Rajasthan Royals captain 2011–2013	Succeeded by Shane Watson
