= Indian cricket team in New Zealand in 1998–99 =

	India	New Zealand
- Dates: 7 December 1998 – 19 January 1999
Captains	Mohammad Azharuddin	Stephen Fleming

Test series
- Result: New Zealand won the 3-match series 1–0
Most runs	Rahul Dravid (321)	Craig McMillan (274)
Most wickets	Javagal Srinath (10)	Simon Doull (12)

One Day International series
- Results: 5-match series drawn 2–2
Most runs	Rahul Dravid (309)	Chris Cairns (226)
Most wickets	Javagal Srinath (9)	Chris Cairns (6)

The India national cricket team toured New Zealand from 7 December 1998 to 19 January 1999 and played a three-match Test series against New Zealand. New Zealand won the series 1–0. The two teams also played a 5-match ODI series that ended in a 2–2 draw.

== Background ==
India came into New Zealand with a poor away record. They had won just one Test away from home since 1986, and not won a series in New Zealand since 1968. Most recently, they had lost away to Zimbabwe in a one-off Test.

From 35 meetings between the two sides, New Zealand had won six, lost 13, and drawn 16 Tests. Going into the Test series, India had five batsmen ranked inside the top 20 of the ICC Men's Player Rankings, three of who averaged over 50. On the other hand, New Zealand had only one batsman averaging above 40, Craig McMillan, and that from only eight Tests. The Christchurch Press wrote, "Where the Black Caps achieve parity and should have an advantage at home is in the bowling ranks. Leg-spinner Anil Kumble and seam bowler Javagal Srinath are the cornerstones of India's bowling attack, while Venkatesh Prasad should develop further in New Zealand conditions. But India's back-up spin bowling resources are barely tried.... [t]hrough Chris Cairns, Dion Nash and Shayne O'Connor, there is wicket-taking prowess."

== Squads ==
Tests
New Zealand	India
Stephen Fleming (c); Geoff Allott; Nathan Astle; Matthew Bell; Chris Cairns; ~~Simon Doull~~; Matt Horne; Craig McMillan; Dion Nash; Shayne O'Connor; Adam Parore (wk); Roger Twose; Daniel Vettori; Paul Wiseman	Mohammad Azharuddin (c); Ajay Jadeja (vc); Ajit Agarkar; Rahul Dravid; Sourav Ganguly; Sunil Joshi; Anil Kumble; V. V. S. Laxman; Debashish Mohanty; Nayan Mongia (wk); Venkatesh Prasad; Navjot Singh Sidhu; Harbhajan Singh; Javagal Srinath; Sachin Tendulkar

India's 15-man Test squad for the tour was announced in November 1998. Harbhajan Singh, Navjot Singh Sidhu and Debashish Mohanty who were excluded from the side for the ICC KnockOut Trophy and tri-series earlier that year, were recalled. The New Zealand Test squad was named on 8 December. Paceman Geoff Allott made a comeback into the squad for the third time and was included ahead of Shayne O'Connor as he offered "more pace and bounce". 21-year-old batsman Matthew Bell was added for the first time. O'Connor was later added to the squad after Simon Doull was ruled out with a strained calf. Roger Twose was included to their side for the Third Test replacing an injured Nathan Astle.

== Tour matches ==
=== Four-day: Central Districts v Indians ===
7–10 December 1998
Scorecard

Indians	v	Central Districts
103 (45.5 overs); Sourav Ganguly 37; Andrew Penn 4/43 (16 overs)		336 (116.2 overs); Craig Spearman 85; Debashish Mohanty 4/69 (22.2 overs)
390 (80 overs); Sachin Tendulkar 154; Campbell Furlong 4/177 (24 overs)		158/3 (41.1 overs); Craig Spearman 86; Venkatesh Prasad 2/37 (10 overs)

Central Districts won by 7 wickets
McLean Park, Napier
Umpires: Steve Dunne and Dave Quested

- Central Districts won the toss and elected to field.

=== Four-day: Wellington v Indians ===
12–15 December 1998
Scorecard

Wellington	v	Indians
317 (102.5 overs); Roger Twose 99; Anil Kumble 5/56 (28.5 overs)		268 (91.1 overs); Sourav Ganguly 93; Mark Jefferson 3/82 (20 overs)
124 (50.1 overs); Tim Boyer 46; Anil Kumble 3/26 (10.1 overs)		175/2 (41 overs); Sourav Ganguly 79*; Carl Bulfin 2/36 (11 overs)

Indians won by 8 wickets
Basin Reserve, Wellington
Umpires: Christopher King and Dave Quested

- Indians won the toss and elected to field.

=== Friendly: New Zealand v India ===
21 December 1998 (D/N)
Scorecard

New Zealand; 304/6 (50 overs)	v	India; 238/8 (50 overs)
Stephen Fleming 73 (64); Anil Kumble 2/50 (10 overs)		VVS Laxman 82 (103); Dion Nash 2/36 (8 overs)

New Zealand won by 66 runs
Carisbrook, Dunedin
Umpires: Steve Dunne and Eddie Nicholls

- India won the toss and elected to field.

== Test series ==
=== 1st Test ===
18–22 December 1998
Scorecard

New Zealand	v	India

Match abandoned
Carisbrook, Dunedin
Umpires: Steve Dunne (NZ) and Eddie Nicholls (WI)

- No toss made.
- Prolonged heavy rain forced match to abandoned on day 3.

=== 2nd Test ===
26–30 December 1998
Scorecard

India	v	New Zealand
208 (65.4 overs); Mohammad Azharuddin 103* (156); Simon Doull 7/65 (24 overs)		352 (148.4 overs); Dion Nash 89* (230); Anil Kumble 4/83 (45.4 overs)
356 (115 overs); Sachin Tendulkar 113 (151); Dion Nash 3/20 (15 overs)		215/6 (60.3 overs); Craig McMillan 74* (122); Javagal Srinath 3/82 (19.3 overs)

New Zealand won by 4 wickets
Basin Reserve, Wellington
Umpires: Eddie Nicholls (WI) and Evan Watkin (NZ)
Player of the match: Simon Doull (NZ)

- India won the toss and elected to bat.
- Matthew Bell (NZ) made his Test debut.

=== 3rd Test ===
2–6 January 1999
Scorecard

New Zealand	v	India
366 (121.2 overs); Craig McMillan 92 (102); Javagal Srinath 5/95 (32.2 overs)		416 (128.3 overs); Rahul Dravid 190 (353); Chris Cairns 4/107 (22.3 overs)
464/8d (137.5 overs); Chris Cairns 126 (202); Sachin Tendulkar 2/30 (7 overs)		249/2 (52.1 overs); Rahul Dravid 103* (136); Chris Cairns 2/30 (9 overs)

Match drawn
WestpacTrust Park, Hamilton
Umpires: Doug Cowie (NZ) and Rudi Koertzen (SA)
Player of the match: Chris Cairns (NZ)

- India won the toss and elected to field.
- Robin Singh Jr. (Ind) made his Test debut.
- Javagal Srinath made 76 in India's first innings, his highest individual score in Tests.
- Rahul Dravid became the third India player to score two centuries in a Test.

== ODIs ==
=== 1st ODI ===
9 January 1999 (D/N)
Scorecard

India; 257/5 (50 overs)	v	New Zealand; 200/5 (38 overs)
Rahul Dravid 123 (123); Daniel Vettori 1/26 (5 overs)		Craig McMillan 73 (76); Javagal Srinath 2/35 (8 overs)

New Zealand won by 5 wickets (D/L method)
Owen Delany Park, Taupō
Umpires: Billy Bowden (NZ) and Doug Cowie (NZ)
Player of the match: Rahul Dravid (Ind)

- India won the toss and elected to bat.
- Play was stopped for 50 minutes due to technical fault in a floodlight tower. On resumption, New Zealand's target was revised to 200 runs off 39 overs.
- It was the first ODI played at this venue.

=== 2nd ODI ===
12 January 1999 (D/N)
Scorecard

New Zealand; 213 (49.3 overs)	v	India; 214/8 (49.5 overs)
Matt Horne 61 (95); Sachin Tendulkar 3/34 (8.3 overs)		Sourav Ganguly 38 (60); Daniel Vettori 2/32 (7 overs)

India won by 2 wickets
McLean Park, Napier
Umpires: Steve Dunne (NZ) and Christopher King (NZ)
Player of the match: Matt Horne (NZ)

- India won the toss and elected to field.
- Eight batsmen were dismissed run out in either side, the most in an ODI.

=== 3rd ODI ===
14 January 1999
Scorecard

India; 208/4 (32 overs)	v	New Zealand; 89/2 (12.1 overs)
Rahul Dravid 68 (71); Gavin Larsen 2/56 (6 overs)		Bryan Young 52* (40); Javagal Srinath 1/22 (4 overs)

No result
Basin Reserve, Wellington
Umpires: Dave Quested (NZ) and Evan Watkin (NZ)

- New Zealand won the toss and elected to field.
- Initially reduced to 32 overs each, the match had to be eventually abandoned due to rain.
- Chris Drum (NZ) made his debut in ODIs.

=== 4th ODI ===
16 January 1999
Scorecard

New Zealand; 207/7 (50 overs)	v	India; 208/5 (43.5 overs)
Chris Cairns 44 (67); Javagal Srinath 3/41 (9 overs)		Rahul Dravid 51 (71); Chris Cairns 3/28 (8 overs)

India won by 5 wickets
Eden Park, Auckland
Umpires: Steve Dunne (NZ) and Tony Hill (NZ)
Player of the match: Rahul Dravid (Ind)

- India won the toss and elected to field.

=== 5th ODI ===
19 January 1999 (D/N)
Scorecard

New Zealand; 300/8 (50 overs)	v	India; 230 (48 overs)
Chris Cairns 115 (80); Javagal Srinath 3/44 (10 overs)		Mohammad Azharuddin 63 (83); Chris Harris 4/40 (10 overs)

New Zealand won by 70 runs
Lancaster Park, Christchurch
Umpires: Dave Quested (NZ) and Christopher King (NZ)
Player of the match: Chris Cairns (NZ)

- India won the toss and elected to field.
- Chris Cairns (NZ) played his 100th ODI. His century off 75 balls was the fastest by a New Zealand batsman.
