= Sir Donald Bradman Oration =

Sir Donald Bradman Oration is an Australian Cricket calendar event which honours the career, contribution and memory of one of the proclaimed greatest-ever cricketers, Sir Don Bradman.

The function provides a platform for a prominent national or international figure to reflect on Sir Donald's career, and on cricket's place in their own lives and the life of the nation. The Honourable John Howard delivered the inaugural oration in August 2000 in his capacity as Australia's prime minister. The 11th Bradman Oration was delivered by former England captain Mike Brearley.

== Background ==
Although his playing career ended more than half a century ago, Sir Donald Bradman remains Australian cricket's most rewarded and influential figure. His contribution as a player, a leader, and an administrator transcended cultures and generational divides, and extended right across the international cricket community.

The Sir Donald Bradman Oration was established by Cricket Australia in 2000 as a means of marking that contribution, and recognising the role that cricket has played in shaping Australian culture and the Australian way of life.

The Oration permits a significant national or sporting identity the opportunity to recognise Sir Donald's unique and profound impact upon the sport on and off the field over a period of more than seven decades. It also provides the keynote speaker with the chance to honour and celebrate his place in Australian history more generally.

== Events ==
Chronological listing of all Bradman Oration speeches
Date	Venue	Honorary Speaker	Country	Ref
17 August 2000	Melbourne	John Howard, Prime Minister of Australia	Australia	
18 December 2003	Brisbane	Sir Michael Parkinson, British Media Personality	England	
15 January 2005	Hobart	Richie Benaud, former Australian Captain	Australia	
29 October 2006	Brisbane	Alan Jones, Radio Personality and former Australian Rugby coach	Australia	
15 January 2008	Perth	General Peter Cosgrove, retired army officer	Australia	
27 August 2008	Sydney	Ricky Ponting, former Australian Captain	Australia	
19 November 2009	Melbourne	Greg Chappell, former Australian Captain	Australia	
2 December 2010	Adelaide	Sir Tim Rice	England	
14 December 2011	Canberra	Rahul Dravid, former Indian Captain	India	
24 October 2012	Melbourne	Gideon Haigh, Sports Journalist	Australia	
23 October 2013	Melbourne	Mike Brearley, former England Captain	England	

== See also ==
- MCC Spirit of Cricket Cowdrey Lecture
- Sir Donald Bradman
- Cricket in Australia
