= 1998-99 Coca-Cola Champions Trophy =

- Date: 6–13 November 1998
- Location: Sharjah, United Arab Emirates
- Result: Won by India
- Player of the series: Sachin Tendulkar (IND)
Teams
India	Sri Lanka	Zimbabwe
Captains
Mohammad Azharuddin	Arjuna Ranatunga	Alistair Campbell
Most runs
Sachin Tendulkar (274) Mohammad Azharuddin (148)	Aravinda de Silva (110); Marvan Atapattu (98)	Andy Flower (161); Grant Flower (140)
Most wickets
Javagal Srinath (8) Sunil Joshi (8)	Pramodya Wickramasinghe (5); Chaminda Vaas (5)	Paul Strang (7); Henry Olonga (4)

The 1998–99 Coca-Cola Champions Trophy was a triangular ODI cricket competition held in Sharjah, United Arab Emirates from 6 to 13 November 1998. It featured the national cricket teams of India, Sri Lanka and Zimbabwe. Its official sponsor was Coca-Cola. The tournament was won by India, who defeated Zimbabwe in the final.

== Points table ==
Team	Pld	W	L	T	NR	NRR	Pts
India	4	3	1	0	0	+0.579	6
Zimbabwe	4	3	1	0	0	+0.068	6
Sri Lanka	4	0	4	0	0	−0.65	0

== Group stage ==
=== 1st ODI ===
6 November (D/N)
Scorecard

Sri Lanka; 245/7 (50 overs)	v	India; 248/7 (49.1 overs)
Marvan Atapattu 64 (93); Anil Kumble 2/39 (10 overs)		Mohammad Azharuddin 94 (131); Chaminda Vaas 2/19 (8 overs)

India won by 3 wickets
Sharjah Cricket Association Stadium, Sharjah
Umpires: Steve Dunne (NZ) and Dave Orchard (AUS)
Player of the match: Mohammad Azharuddin (IND)

- India won the toss and elected to field.

=== 2nd ODI ===
7 November (D/N)
Scorecard

Sri Lanka; 196 (49.4 overs)	v	Zimbabwe; 197/3 (46.1 overs)
Aravinda de Silva 55 (68); Craig Evans 3/11 (3 overs)		Grant Flower 87* (127); Nuwan Zoysa 1/33 (10 overs)

Zimbabwe won by 7 wickets
Sharjah Cricket Association Stadium, Sharjah
Umpires: Javed Akhtar (PAK) and Dave Orchard (AUS)
Player of the match: Eddo Brandes (ZIM)

- Zimbabwe won the toss and elected to field.

=== 3rd ODI ===
8 November (D/N)
Scorecard

Zimbabwe; 196 (49.5 overs)	v	India; 197/3 (40.4 overs)
Heath Streak 59 (71); Nikhil Chopra 2/21 (10 overs)		Sachin Tendulkar 118* (112); Paul Strang 3/32 (10 overs)

India won by 7 wickets
Sharjah Cricket Association Stadium, Sharjah
Umpires: Javed Akhtar (PAK) and Dave Orchard (AUS)
Player of the match: Sachin Tendulkar (IND)

- India won the toss and elected to field.

=== 4th ODI ===
9 November (D/N)
Scorecard

India; 179 (49.5 overs)	v	Sri Lanka; 98 (39 overs)
Ajay Jadeja 64 (117); Kumar Dharmasena 3/31 (9 overs)		Aravinda de Silva 29 (67); Sunil Joshi 3/17 (10 overs)

India won by 81 runs
Sharjah Cricket Association Stadium, Sharjah
Umpires: Steve Dunne (NZ) and Dave Orchard (AUS)
Player of the match: Ajit Agarkar (IND)

- Sri Lanka won the toss and elected to field.

=== 5th ODI ===
10 November (D/N)
Scorecard

Zimbabwe; 259/7 (50 overs)	v	Sri Lanka; 235 (48.5 overs)
Andy Flower 95 (109); Pramodya Wickramasinghe 3/28 (10 overs)		Hashan Tillakaratne 72* (83); Paul Strang 4/32 (10 overs)

Zimbabwe won by 24 runs
Sharjah Cricket Association Stadium, Sharjah
Umpires: Javed Akhtar (PAK) and Dave Orchard (AUS)
Player of the match: Paul Strang (ZIM)

- Sri Lanka won the toss and elected to field.

=== 6th ODI ===
11 November (D/N)
Scorecard

Zimbabwe; 205/7 (50 overs)	v	India; 192 (47.4 overs)
Alistair Campbell 83* (110); Sunil Joshi 2/43 (9 overs)		Robin Singh 49* (75); Henry Olonga 4/46 (8 overs)

Zimbabwe won by 13 runs
Sharjah Cricket Association Stadium, Sharjah
Umpires: Steve Dunne (NZ) and Javed Akhtar (PAK)
Player of the match: Henry Olonga (Zim)

- India won the toss and elected to field.

== Final ==
13 November (D/N)
Scorecard

Zimbabwe; 196/9 (50 overs)	v	India; 197/0 (30 overs)
Paul Strang 46 (91); Javagal Srinath 3/40 (10 overs)		Sachin Tendulkar 124* (92)

India won by 10 wickets
Sharjah Cricket Association Stadium, Sharjah
Umpires: Steve Dunne (NZ) and Dave Orchard (AUS)
Player of the match: Sachin Tendulkar (IND)

- India won the toss and elected to bowl.
- India won the 1998–99 Coca-Cola Champions Trophy
