= Nantie Hayward =

South African cricketer

Personal information
- Full name: Mornantau Hayward
- Born: 6 March 1977 (age 49); Uitenhage, Eastern Cape, South Africa
- Batting: Right-handed
- Bowling: Right-arm fast
- Role: Bowler

International information
- National side: South Africa (1998–2004)
- Test debut (cap 274): 9 December 1999 v England
- Last Test: 11 August 2004 v Sri Lanka
- ODI debut (cap 50): 18 August 1998 v England
- Last ODI: 9 April 2002 v Australia

Domestic team information
- Years: Team
- 1995/96–2003/04: Eastern Province
- 2003: Worcestershire
- 2004–2005: Middlesex
- 2004/05–2007/08: Warriors
- 2005/06: Dolphins
- 2008: Hampshire (squad no. 39)
- 2009: Derbyshire
- 2011/12: North West

Career statistics
Competition	Test	ODI	FC	LA
Matches	16	21	135	151
Runs scored	66	12	1,096	207
Batting average	7.33	3.00	11.29	9.40
100s/50s	0/0	0/0	0/1	0/0
Top score	14	4	55*	19*
Balls bowled	2,821	993	12,859	5,515
Wickets	54	21	445	203
Bowling average	29.79	40.85	28.89	27.16
5 wickets in innings	1	0	9	3
10 wickets in match	0	0	2	0
Best bowling	5/56	4/31	6/31	5/37
Catches/stumpings	4/–	4/–	36/–	30/–
- Source: ESPNcricinfo, 11 April 2025

Mornantau "Nantie" Hayward (born 6 March 1977) is a South African former cricketer, who played in 16 Test matches and 21 One Day Internationals for the national team between 1998 and 2004.

He played as a right-arm fast bowler, who, according to Peter Robinson, had "genuine pace, the ability to get bounce and abundant energy". The fastest recorded delivery by a South African pacer is ascribed to him, 154 km/h (around 95 mph), that he delivered twice, both in 2001, against India and Australia.

He played for Derbyshire until his retirement from all cricket in 2012.

== International career ==
At the time of Robinson's article, "Hayward [was] clearly seen as the successor to Allan Donald as the spearhead of the South African attack." However Hayward did not play a Test match after August 2004 or a One Day International after April 2002. Steve Waugh appears to have reached this conclusion in his autobiography, saying that: "I'm amazed he didn't...become world-class...a collective cheer went up in the Australian camp whenever his unpredictable raw pace was overlooked [by the South African selectors]."

== Ireland career ==
He played for Ireland in the 2007 Friends Provident Trophy.
