= Australian cricket team in India in 2004–05 =

2004–05 Border–Gavaskar Trophy
- Date: October – November 2004
- Location: India
- Result: Australia won the 4-match series 2–1
- Player of the series: (Australia) Damien Martyn
Teams
- Australia: India
Captains
- Adam Gilchrist (1st, 2nd & 3rd Tests) Ricky Ponting (4th test): Sourav Ganguly (1st & 2nd Tests); Rahul Dravid (3rd & 4th Tests)
Most runs
- Damien Martyn (444): Virender Sehwag (299)
Most wickets
- Jason Gillespie (20): Anil Kumble (27)

The Australia national cricket team toured India in the 2004–05 season and played a four-match Test series, during October and November 2004, against India, Australia winning the series 2–1 with one match drawn, their first series win on Indian soil since their 1969–70 tour. The future Australian Test captain, Michael Clarke, made his Test debut in the first match, scoring 151 in the first innings. In the fourth match of the series, Clarke took 6 wickets for 9 runs in the second innings.

== Background ==
This was Australia's tenth tour of India. They had successes in the initial tours starting 1956–57, while India's successes came only in the later series. Australia had last won there in 1969–70, in their fourth visit. The tour preceding 2004–05, was in 2000–01, which ended 2–1 in India's favor, dubbed as one of India's greatest Test series wins of all time.

The schedule for the series was finalised by the Board of Control for Cricket in India (BCCI) in July 2004. Australia were scheduled to play a warm-up match against Board President's XI, a three-day fixture starting 30 September. It was announced that the First Test would begin on 6 October and the final on 7 November. The venues were announced a few days later for this series and the one after, against South Africa later that season. Australia were to play the four Tests respectively at the M. Chinnaswamy Stadium in Bangalore, the M. A. Chidambaram Stadium in Chennai, the Vidarbha Cricket Association Ground in Nagpur, and the Wankhede Stadium in Mumbai. Hyderabad was announced as the venue for Australia's warm-up match. In early September, Ranji Trophy champions Mumbai were announced as their opponent and that the match would be played at the Brabourne Stadium in Mumbai.

India were coming on the back of a poor performance at the Champions Trophy. However, captain Sourav Ganguly dismissed its effects on the series and stated that "One-dayers are one-off games. Our showing in these matches will have no bearing on the Test series". Going into the series, his side were ranked fourth, and Australia first, in the ICC Test Team Rankings.

== Squads ==
India	Australia
Sourav Ganguly (c); Ajit Agarkar; Aakash Chopra; Rahul Dravid; Gautam Gambhir; Dheeraj Jadhav; Mohammad Kaif; Dinesh Karthik (wk); Murali Kartik; Zaheer Khan; Anil Kumble; VVS Laxman; Parthiv Patel (wk); Irfan Pathan; Shib Paul; Virender Sehwag; Harbhajan Singh; Yuvraj Singh; Sachin Tendulkar	Ricky Ponting (c); Michael Clarke; Adam Gilchrist (wk, vc); Jason Gillespie; Nathan Hauritz; Matthew Hayden; Michael Kasprowicz; Simon Katich; Justin Langer; Brett Lee; Darren Lehmann; Damien Martyn; Glenn McGrath; Shane Warne; Shane Watson; Cameron White

A 16-man Australia squad was announced for the tour on 9 September 2004. It included three frontline spinners, Shane Warne, Nathan Hauritz and Cameron White, and two part-timers Simon Katich and Michael Clarke. The spin-heavy squad picked was in contract to their previous tour. Spinner Stuart MacGill, who had a poor home series against India, and paceman Shaun Tait were dropped from the squad; paceman Brett Lee was added alongside Test regulars Glenn McGrath, Jason Gillespie and Michael Kasprowicz. White's ability with the bat was cited by the selectors as the reason for his inclusion over MacGill, in addition to his spin bowling. His bowling had drawn comparisons to India's Anil Kumble in that "he generates significant bounce off the pitch and is very quick through the air, and it's a style of bowling which has proved extremely effective on Indian wickets." Uncapped all-rounder Shane Watson was included as a specialist batsman on the back of good performances in the Australian domestic season. Eight other specialist batsman were included in the squad, all of them being Test regulars.

Australia captain Ricky Ponting, who sustained a thumb injury during the Champions Trophy, was replaced by Brad Hodge for the First Test. He was later ruled out for the first two tests, and later, even the Third. Vice-captain Adam Gilchrist was elevated to captaincy and Darren Lehmann was named the vice-captain.

There were speculations that India's Sachin Tendulkar would not make the squad owing to his tennis elbow injury that had ruled him out of there ODI tournaments that India played preceding the Test series — the Holland triangular series, the NatWest Challenge and the Champions Trophy. However, he stated he "really want[ed] to play" and that he was "hoping and praying that I am fit for the series, but it is important to be in good shape for that challenge." However, in the 15-man squad named by the BCCI on 1 October for the first two Tests, he was included. An injured Ashish Nehra was left out of the squad that saw three other pacemen in Zaheer Khan, Irfan Pathan and Ajit Agarkar, the latter of who was included owing to a good record against Australia. Mohammad Kaif, Murali Kartik, Aakash Chopra and Yuvraj Singh were other inclusions. Captain Ganguly stated that either of Singh or Chopra would open the innings for his team alongside Virender Sehwag.

Having not recovered in time, Tendulkar was ruled out of the First Test, a day prior of the match. This was the first time in his career that he missed a home Test match. He also missed the second Test. He returned for the Third, before conceding that he was not fully fit; "... the elbow is obviously not a 100 percent." In India's squad announced for the Fourth Test, Patel, Chopra, Singh and Agarkar were excluded and four uncapped players were brought in — batsmen Gautam Gambhir, Dheeraj Jadhav and Dinesh Karthik, and paceman Shib Paul.

== Tour match ==
=== First class: Mumbai v Australians ===
30 September–2 October
Scorecard

Australians	v	Mumbai
302/7d (101 overs); Damien Martyn 71 (150); Ramesh Powar 2/104 (29 overs)		255 (92.2 overs); Amol Muzumdar 52 (96); Glenn McGrath 4/25 (21.2 overs)
207/2 (54 overs); Justin Langer 108 (151); Ramesh Powar 1/85 (16 overs)

Match drawn
Brabourne Stadium, Mumbai
Umpires: Tej Handu (Ind) and Krishna Hariharan (Ind)

- Australians won the toss and elected to bat.
- Rain on day 4 prevented play until 13:40.
- Vinit Indulkar (Indians) made his debut in first-class cricket.

== Test series ==
=== 1st Test ===
6–10 October 2004
Scorecard

Australia	v	India
474 (130 overs); Michael Clarke 151 (248); Harbhajan Singh 5/146 (49 overs		246 (89.2 overs); Parthiv Patel 46 (125); Glenn McGrath 4/55 (25 overs)
228 (78.1 overs); Damien Martyn 45 (139); Harbhajan Singh 6/78 (30.1 overs)		239 (87.4 overs); Rahul Dravid 60 (188); Jason Gillespie 3/33 (14.4 overs)

Australia won by 217 runs
M. Chinnaswamy Stadium, Bangalore
Umpires: Billy Bowden (NZ) and Steve Bucknor (WI)
Player of the match: Michael Clarke (Aus)

- Australia won the toss and elected to bat.
- Michael Clarke (Aus) made his Test debut.
- Anil Kumble became the second India player to claim 400 wickets in Tests.
- Michael Clarke (Aus) scored a century on his Test debut, the first to do so against India.
- Irfan Pathan (Ind) scored his first half-century in Tests.

=== 2nd Test ===
14–18 October 2004
Scorecard

Australia	v	India
235 (71.3 overs); Justin Langer 71 (113); Anil Kumble 7/48 (17.3 overs)		376 (134.3 overs); Virender Sehwag 155 (221); Shane Warne 6/125 (42.3 overs)
369 (133.5 overs); Damien Martyn 104 (210); Anil Kumble 6/133 (47 overs)		19/0 (3 overs); Virender Sehwag 12* (10)

Match drawn
MA Chidambaram Stadium, Chepauk, Chennai
Umpires: Rudi Koertzen (SA) and David Shepherd (Eng)
Player of the match: Anil Kumble (Ind)

- Australia won the toss and elected to bat.
- No play was possible on day 5.
- Anil Kumble claimed his 25th five-wicket haul in Tests.

=== 3rd Test ===
26–29 October 2004
Scorecard

Australia	v	India
398 (100.2 overs); Damien Martyn 114 (165); Zaheer Khan 4/95 (26.2 overs)		185 (91.5 overs); Mohammad Kaif 55 (151); Jason Gillespie 5/56 (22.5 overs)
329/5d (98.1 overs); Simon Katich 99 (157); Zaheer Khan 2/64 (21.1 overs)		200 (53.3 overs); Virender Sehwag 58 (94); Jason Gillespie 4/24 (16 overs)

Australia won by 342 runs
Vidarbha Cricket Association Ground, Nagpur
Umpires: Aleem Dar (Pak) and David Shepherd (Eng)
Player of the match: Damien Martyn (Aus)

- Australia won the toss and elected to bat.
- Glenn McGrath (Aus) played his 100th Test. He claimed his 450th wicket in Tests, the second by an Australia player, and fourth overall.

=== 4th Test ===
3–5 November 2004
Scorecard

India	v	Australia
104 (41.3 overs); Rahul Dravid 31* (104); Jason Gillespie 4/29 (12 overs)		203 (61.3 overs); Damien Martyn 55 (114); Anil Kumble 5/90 (19 overs)
205 (68.2 overs); VVS Laxman 69 (127); Michael Clarke 6/9 (6.2 overs)		93 (30.5 overs); Matthew Hayden 24 (30); Harbhajan Singh 5/29 (10.5 overs)

India won by 13 runs
Wankhede Stadium, Mumbai
Umpires: Aleem Dar (Pak) and Rudi Koertzen (SA)
Player of the match: Murali Kartik (Ind)

- India won the toss and elected to bat.
- Nathan Hauritz (Aus), Dinesh Karthik and Gautam Gambhir (Ind) made their Test debuts.

Preceded by 2000–01	Australian cricket team in India	Succeeded by 2007
