= West Indian cricket team in India in 2002–03 =

West Indies cricket team in India in 2002–03
	India	West Indies
- Dates: 04 October 2002 – 24 November 2002
Captains	SC Ganguly	CL Hooper

Test series
- Result: India won the 3-match series 2–0
Most runs	SR Tendulkar (306)	S Chanderpaul (260)
Most wickets	Harbhajan Singh (20)	Mervyn Dillon (11)
- Player of the series: Harbhajan Singh (Ind)

One Day International series
- Results: West Indies won the 7-match series 4–3
Most runs	VVS Laxman (312)	CH Gayle (435)
Most wickets	Virender Sehwag (8)	Vasbert Drakes (10)
- Player of the series: Chris Gayle (WI)

The West Indies national cricket team visited India in 2002 for a 3-match test series and followed by 7 one day international matches. India won the test series 2–0 and West Indies won the ODI series 4–3.

== Squads ==
India		West Indies	
Tests	ODIs	Tests	ODIs
Sourav Ganguly (c); Rahul Dravid; Sachin Tendulkar; Shiv Sunder Das; Virender Sehwag; VVS Laxman; Sanjay Bangar; Parthiv Patel (wk); Anil Kumble; Harbhajan Singh; Javagal Srinath; Ashish Nehra; Ajit Agarkar; Zaheer Khan; Amit Mishra	Sourav Ganguly (c); Rahul Dravid (wk); Virender Sehwag; VVS Laxman; Sanjay Bangar; Anil Kumble; Harbhajan Singh; Javagal Srinath; Ashish Nehra; Ajit Agarkar; Yuvraj Singh; Mohammed Kaif; Jai P Yadav; Dinesh Mongia; Parthiv Patel (wk); Lakshmipathy Balaji; Murali Karthik; Sarandeep Singh; Reetinder Sodhi	Carl Hooper (c); Gareth Breese; Shivnarine Chanderpaul; Pedro Collins; Cameron Cuffy; Mervyn Dillon; Chris Gayle; Ryan Hinds; Wavell Hinds; Ridley Jacobs (wk); Daren Ganga; Jermaine Lawson; Mahendra Nagamootoo; Darren Powell; Marlon Samuels; Ramnaresh Sarwan	Carl Hooper (c); Shivnarine Chanderpaul; Pedro Collins; Cameron Cuffy; Mervyn Dillon; Daren Ganga; Chris Gayle; Ryan Hinds; Wavell Hinds; Ridley Jacobs (wk); Mahendra Nagamootoo; Marlon Samuels; Ramnaresh Sarwan; Corey Collymore; Vasbert Drakes; Ricardo Powell

== Test Series ==
=== 1st Test ===
09–12 October
Scorecard

India	v	West Indies
457 (163.5 overs); V Sehwag 147 (206); M Dillon 3/54 (31.2 Overs)		157 (74.5 overs); S Chanderpaul 54 (159); Z Khan 4/41 (16 Overs)
		188 (68.3 overs); CH Gayle 42 (93); Harbhajan Singh 7/48 (28.3 Overs)

India won by an innings and 112 runs
Wankhede Stadium, Mumbai
Umpires: EAR de Silva (SL) and DR Shepherd (Eng)
Player of the match: Virender Sehwag (Ind)

- India won the toss and elected to bat

=== 2nd Test ===
17–20 October
Scorecard

West Indies	v	India
167 (79.3 overs); CL Hooper 35 (38); A Kumble 5/30 (23.3 Overs)		316 (106.1 overs); V Sehwag 61 (65); M Dillon 3/44 (26 Overs)
229 (79.4 overs); RR Sarwan 78 (214); Harbhajan Singh 4/79 (30 Overs)		81/2 (21.1 overs); V Sehwag 33 (30); CL Hooper 2/32 (7 Overs)

India won by 8 wickets
MA Chidambaram Stadium, Chepauk, Chennai
Umpires: EAR de Silva (SL) and DR Shepherd (Eng)
Player of the match: Harbhajan Singh (Ind)

- West Indies won the toss and elected to bat
- GR Breese and JJC Lawson made their Test debuts for West Indies.

=== 3rd Test ===
30 October - 3 November
Scorecard

India	v	West Indies
358 (101.2 overs); SB Bangar 77 (201); M Dillon 3/82 (22 Overs)		497 (171.3 overs); Shivnarine Chanderpaul 140 (258); Harbhajan Singh 5/115 (57.3 Overs)
471/8 (159 overs); SR Tendulkar 176 (298); CE Cuffy 2/52 (17 Overs)

Match Drawn
Eden Gardens, Kolkata
Umpires: EAR de Silva (SL) and DR Shepherd (Eng)
Player of the match: SR Tendulkar (Ind)

- India won the toss and elected to bat
- Carl Hooper, Cameron Cuffy, Javagal Srinath played their final test match.

== ODI Series ==
=== 1st ODI ===
06 November
Scorecard

India; 283/6 (50 overs)	v	West Indies; 285/6 (50 overs)
AB Agarkar 95 (102); PT Collins 2/40 (10 overs)		WW Hinds 93 (107); A Nehra 2/50 (9 overs)

West Indies won by 4 wickets
Keenan Stadium, Jamshedpur
Umpires: EAR de Silva (SL) and AV Jayaprakash (Ind)
Player of the match: Ramnaresh Sarwan (West Indies)

- India won the toss and elected to bat
- Jai P Yadav made his ODI debut for India.

=== 2nd ODI ===
09 November
Scorecard

India; 279/9 (47 overs)	v	West Indies; 280/3 (46.2 overs)
VVS Laxman 99 (110); VC Drakes 3/55 (9 overs)		CH Gayle 103 (116); J Srinath 2/35 (9.2 overs)

West Indies won by 7 wkts (D/L)
Vidarbha Cricket Association Ground, Nagpur
Umpires: EAR de Silva (SL) and K Hariharan (Ind)
Player of the match: Chris Gayle (WI)

- West Indies won the toss and elected to field
- Crowd interruption at 16.1 overs with the score at 90/2 in India innings, match was further reduced to 47 overs a side according to Duckworth-Lewis method

=== 3rd ODI ===
12 November
Scorecard

West Indies; 300/5 (50 overs)	v	India; 200/1 (27.1 overs)
RR Sarwan 84 (88); Harbhajan Singh 2/59 (10 overs)		V Sehwag 114* (82); V Drakes 1/36 (6 overs)

India won by 81 runs (D/L)
Madhavrao Scindia Cricket Ground, Rajkot
Umpires: EAR de Silva (SL) and AV Jayaprakash (Ind)
Player of the match: V Sehwag (Ind)

- India won the toss and elected to field
- RD Jacobs lead the West Indian side in the absence of CL Hooper
- Crowd interruption at 27.1 overs with the score at 200/1 in India innings, India were named winners by 81 runs, by the Duckworth-Lewis method

=== 4th ODI ===
15 November (D/N)
Scorecard

West Indies; 324/4 (50 overs)	v	India; 325/5 (47.4 overs)
CH Gayle 140 (127); Harbhajan Singh 1/30 (10 overs)		R Dravid 109* (124); M Dillon 2/65 (10 overs)

India won by 5 wickets (with 14 balls remaining)
Sardar Patel Stadium, Motera, Ahmedabad
Umpires: EAR de Silva (SL) and K Hariharan (Ind)
Player of the match: Rahul Dravid (IND)

- India won the toss and elected to field

=== 5th ODI ===
18 November
Scorecard

India; 290/8 (48 overs)	v	West Indies; 291/5 (46.5 overs)
VVS Laxman 71 (101); PT Collins 3/60 (9 overs)		CH Gayle 101 (107); Harbhajan Singh 2/53 (10 overs)

West Indies won by 5 wickets
Indian Petrochemicals Corporation Limited Sports Complex Ground, Vadodara
Umpires: EAR de Silva (SL) and AV Jayaprakash (Ind)
Player of the match: Chris Gayle (WI)

- West Indies won the toss and elected to field
- L Balaji made his ODI debut for India.
- Match delayed by Wet outfield. Each innings, consequently, has been reduced to 48 overs

=== 6th ODI ===
21 November
Scorecard

West Indies; 201 (46.3 overs)	v	India; 202/7 (46.2 overs)
S Chanderpaul 58 (64); AB Agarkar 3/24 (9 overs)		R Dravid 58 (82); VC Drakes 3/38 (10 overs)

India won by 3 wickets (with 22 balls remaining)
Barkatullah Khan Stadium, Jodhpur
Umpires: EAR de Silva (SL) and K Hariharan (Ind)
Player of the match: AB Agarkar (Ind)

- India won the toss and elected to field
- R Dravid lead the India side in the absence of SC Ganguly

=== 7th ODI ===
24 November
Scorecard

West Indies; 315/6 (50 overs)	v	India; 180 (36.5 overs)
MN Samuels 108* (75); V Sehwag 3/59 (7 overs)		Yuvraj Singh 68 (69); JJC Lawson 4/57 (10 overs)

West Indies won by 135 runs
Indira Gandhi Stadium, Vijayawada
Umpires: EAR de Silva (SL) and AV Jayaprakash (Ind)
Player of the match: MN Samuels (WI)

- India won the toss and elected to field
- R Dravid lead the India side in the absence of SC Ganguly

== Statistics ==
=== Tests ===
==== Batting ====
Most runs

	Player	Matches	Innings	Runs	HS	Avg	Balls Faced
(India)	Sachin Tendulkar	3	5	306	176	76.50	584
(India)	Virender Sehwag	3	5	286	147	57.20	343
(India)	VVS Laxman	3	4	271	154*	90.33	709
(Cricket West Indies)	Shivnarine Chanderpaul	3	5	260	140	65.00	630
(Cricket West Indies)	Wavell Hinds	3	5	220	100	44.00	443

==== Bowling ====
Most wickets

	Player	Matches	Wickets	Runs	BBI	BBM	Econ
(India)	Harbhajan Singh	3	20	335	7/48	8/85	2.01
(India)	Anil Kumble	3	16	387	5/30	7/101	2.52
(Cricket West Indies)	Mervyn Dillon	3	11	275	3/44	5/167	2.51
(India)	Zaheer Khan	2	8	111	4/41	4/44	2.60
(Cricket West Indies)	Cameron Cuffy	2	6	224	2/52	4/136	3.16

=== ODIs ===
==== Batting ====
Most runs

	Player	Matches	Innings	Runs	HS	Avg	Balls Faced
(Cricket West Indies)	Chris Gayle	7	7	455	140	65.00	479
(Cricket West Indies)	Ramnaresh Sarwan	7	7	436	99*	109.00	515
(India)	VVS Laxman	7	7	312	99	52.00	395
(India)	Rahul Dravid	7	6	300	109*	75.00	334
(Cricket West Indies)	Wavell Hinds	7	7	295	93	42.14	345

==== Bowling ====
Most wickets

	Player	Matches	Wickets	Runs	BBI	Avg	Econ
(Cricket West Indies)	Vasbert Drakes	7	10	312	3/38	31.20	5.70
(Cricket West Indies)	Pedro Collins	4	8	198	3/60	24.75	5.21
(India)	Virender Sehwag	7	8	321	3/59	40.12	5.85
(Cricket West Indies)	Corey Collymore	4	6	163	2/30	27.16	5.37
(India)	Ajit Agarkar	5	6	232	3/24	38.66	5.65
