= New Zealand cricket team in India in 2003–04 =

New Zealand cricket team in India in 2003/04
	India	New Zealand
- Dates: 26 September – 15 November 2003
Captains	Sourav Ganguly	Stephen Fleming

Test series
- Result: 2-match series drawn 0–0
Most runs	Rahul Dravid (313)	Craig McMillan (237)
Most wickets	Anil Kumble (9)	Daryl Tuffey (8)
- Player of the series: VVS Laxman (Ind)

The New Zealand cricket team toured India from 26 September 2003 to 15 November 2003. The tour included two Tests and six ODIs as part of the TVS Cup Tri series which also involved Australia.

== Squads ==
Tests		ODIs	
India	New Zealand	India	New Zealand
Sourav Ganguly (c); Aakash Chopra; Virender Sehwag; Rahul Dravid; Sachin Tendulkar; VVS Laxman; Parthiv Patel (wk); Harbhajan Singh; Anil Kumble; Zaheer Khan; Lakshmipathy Balaji; Yuvraj Singh; Ajit Agarkar; Sairaj Bahutule	Stephen Fleming (c); Mark Richardson; Lou Vincent; Scott Styris; Nathan Astle; Craig McMillan; Jacob Oram; Robbie Hart (wk); Daniel Vettori; Paul Wiseman; Daryl Tuffey; Ian Butler; Richard Jones; Michael Mason	Rahul Dravid (c & wk); Sourav Ganguly (c)*; Sachin Tendulkar; Virender Sehwag; VVS Laxman; Yuvraj Singh; Parthiv Patel (wk); Harbhajan Singh; Anil Kumble; Zaheer Khan; Mohammed Kaif; Ajit Agarkar; Hemang Badani; Sairaj Bahutule; Murali Karthik; Ashish Nehra; Aavishkar Salvi	Stephen Fleming (c); Brendon McCullum (wk); Lou Vincent; Scott Styris; Craig McMillan; Chris Cairns **; Chris Harris; Jacob Oram; Ian Butler; Daniel Vettori; Daryl Tuffey; Paul Hitchcock; Chris Nevin; Kyle Mills

- * Sourav Ganguly played only two matches in ODI series.
- ** Chris Cairns captained the New Zealand side for one match.

== Tests ==
=== 1st Test ===
08–12 October
(scorecard)

India	v	New Zealand
500/5 dec (159 overs); Rahul Dravid 222 (387); Daniel Vettori 2/128 (44 overs)		340 (131.1 overs); Nathan Astle 103 (207); Zaheer Khan 4/68 (23 overs)
209/6 dec (44.5 overs); Rahul Dravid 73 (86); Paul Wiseman 4/64 (11.5 overs)		272/6 (107 overs); Craig McMillan 83 (190); Anil Kumble 4/95 (39 overs)

Match Drawn
Sardar Patel Stadium, Motera, Ahmedabad
Umpires: Rudi Koertzen (SA), David Shepherd (Eng) & Krishna Hariharan(Ind)
Player of the match: Rahul Dravid (Ind)

- India won the toss and elected to bat
- Test Debuts: Lakshmipathy Balaji & Aakash Chopra (Ind)

=== 2nd Test ===
16–20 October
(scorecard)

New Zealand	v	India
630/6 dec (198.3 overs); Mark Richardson 145 (410); Anil Kumble 3/181 (66 overs)		424 (172 overs); Virender Sehwag 130 (225); Daryl Tuffey 4/80 (29 overs)
		136/4 (69 overs); VVS Laxman 67 (183); Daryl Tuffey 3/30 (14 overs)

Match Drawn
Punjab Cricket Association Stadium, Mohali, Chandigarh
Umpires: Rudi Koertzen (SA), David Shepherd (Eng) & Ivaturi Shivram (Ind)
Player of the match: Daryl Tuffey (NZ)

- New Zealand won the toss and elected to bat
- This was Rahul Dravid's first test match as a captain
- Test Debuts: Yuvraj Singh (Ind)

== TVS cup Tri Series ==
The 2003–04 TVS cup was a triangular One Day International cricket tournament, played by India, New Zealand and Australia. The tournament was held in India from 23 October 2003 to 18 November 2003, and consisted of a round robin stage, in which each nation played each of the others three times. The top two teams at the end of the round robin stage then played the final match of the series.

In a close round robin, India with 16 points and Australia with 28 points from the group stage qualified for the final; New Zealand finished last with 10 points, and did not qualify for the final. Australia beat India by 37 runs in the final.

Group Stage
Pos	Team	P	W	L	T	NR	BP	Points	NRR	For	Against
1	Australia	6	5	1	0	0	3	28	+1.113	1464/266.3	1314/300
2	India	6	2	3	0	1	3	16	+0.110	1377/250	1336/247.3
3	New Zealand	6	1	4	0	1	2	10	-1.457	993/247.3	1184/216.3
