= 2004 Videocon Cup =

- Part of Indian cricket team in England in 2004
- Date: 21–28 August 2004
- Location: Netherlands
- Result: Won by Australia
- Player of the series: No award
Teams
Australia	India	Pakistan
Captains
RT Ponting	SC Ganguly	Inzamam-ul-Haq
Most runs
ML Hayden (88)	VVS Laxman (37)	Shoaib Malik (104)
Most wickets
DS Lehmann (2) A Symonds (2)	L Balaji (6)	Shahid Afridi (4)

The Videocon Cup was the name of the One Day International cricket tournament in the Netherlands during August 2004. It was a tri-nation series between Australia, India and Pakistan. All matches took place at the VRA Cricket Ground, Amstelveen. The tournament preceded, and acted as a warm-up for, the 2004 ICC Champions Trophy.

The tournament was disrupted by rain, with only one of the three group stage matches reaching a conclusion. Australia refused to reschedule their two washed-out group matches, and qualified for the final without completing a game.

By beating India in the opening match, Pakistan also qualified for the Final. Australia beat Pakistan in the Final to win the series.

Shoaib Malik of Pakistan emerged as the top run-scorer with 104 runs, with an average of 52.00; Matthew Hayden of Australia followed close behind with 88 runs. Lakshmipathy Balaji of India finished the series as top wicket-taker capturing 6 wickets, with Shahid Afridi of Pakistan taking 4.

== Squads ==
Australia	India	Pakistan
Ricky Ponting (c); Michael Clarke; Jason Gillespie; Ian Harvey; Matthew Hayden; Brad Hogg; Michael Kasprowicz; Brett Lee; Darren Lehmann; Damien Martyn; Glenn McGrath; Andrew Symonds; Shane Watson; Brad Haddin (wk)	Virender Sehwag; Sachin Tendulkar; Sourav Ganguly (c); Rahul Dravid; VVS Laxman; Yuvraj Singh; Mohammad Kaif; Ajit Agarkar; Dinesh Karthik (wk); Anil Kumble; Harbhajan Singh; Lakshmipathy Balaji; Ashish Nehra; Irfan Pathan; Rohan Gavaskar	Inzamam-ul-Haq (c); Yasir Hameed; Imran Farhat; Salman Butt; Mohammad Yousuf; Younis Khan; Moin Khan (wk); Shoaib Malik; Abdur Razzaq; Shahid Afridi; Shoaib Akhtar; Mohammad Sami; Shabbir Ahmed; Naved-ul-Hasan

== Points table ==
Team	Pld	W	L	T	NR	BP	Pts	NRR
Pakistan	2	1	0	0	1	1	9	+2.000
Australia	2	0	0	0	2	0	6	+0.000
India	2	0	1	0	1	0	3	−2.000

== Group stage matches ==
=== 1st match ===
21 August 2004
Scorecard

Pakistan; 192/6 (33 overs)	v	India; 127 (27 overs)
Shoaib Malik 68 (67); L Balaji 3/27 (7 overs)		VVS Laxman 37 (51); Shahid Afridi 4/20 (6 overs)

Pakistan won by 66 runs (D/L method)
VRA Cricket Ground, Amstelveen
Umpires: SA Bucknor (WI) and DR Shepherd (ENG)
Player of the match: Shoaib Malik (PAK)

- India won the toss and elected to field.
- The match was reduced before play started to 36 overs per side.
- The match was reduced to 33 overs per side, India's target was 194 runs.
- Points: India 0; Pakistan 6.

=== 2nd match ===
23 August 2004
Scorecard

Australia; 175/7 (31.4 overs)	v	India
MJ Clarke 42 (28); L Balaji 3/20 (6 overs)

No result
VRA Cricket Ground, Amstelveen
Umpires: SA Bucknor (WI) and JW Lloyds (ENG)

- Australia won the toss and elected to bat.
- The match was reduced before play started to 32 overs per side.
- Points: Australia 3; India 3.

=== 3rd match ===
25 August 2004
Scorecard

Australia	v	Pakistan

Match abandoned
VRA Cricket Ground, Amstelveen
Umpires: SA Bucknor (WI) and JW Lloyds (ENG)

- Points: Australia 3; Pakistan 3.

== Final ==
28 August 2004
Scorecard

Australia; 192/7 (50 overs)	v	Pakistan; 175 (47.1 overs)
ML Hayden 59 (114); Shoaib Akhtar 3/40 (10 overs)		Mohammad Yousuf 43 (57); A Symonds 2/25 (7 overs)

Australia won by 17 runs
VRA Cricket Ground, Amstelveen
Umpires: SA Bucknor (WI) and DR Shepherd (ENG)
Player of the match: A Symonds (AUS)

- Australia won the toss and elected to bat.
