= Lakshmipathy Balaji =

Indian cricketer

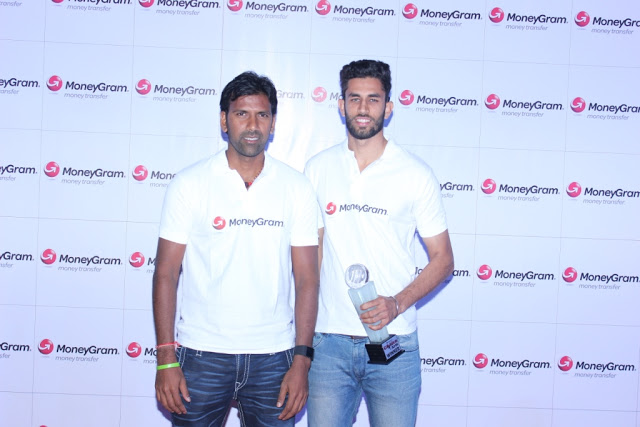
- Balaji (left) in 2016

Personal information
- Born: 27 September 1981 (age 45); Madras, Tamil Nadu, India
- Height: 6 ft 2 in (188 cm)
- Batting: Right-handed
- Bowling: Right-arm fast medium
- Role: Bowler

International information
- National side: India (2002–2012)
- Test debut (cap 245): 8 October 2003 v New Zealand
- Last Test: 24 March 2005 v Pakistan
- ODI debut (cap 147): 18 November 2002 v West Indies
- Last ODI: 8 February 2009 v Sri Lanka
- ODI shirt no.: 55 (formerly 7)
- T20I debut (cap 43): 11 September 2012 v New Zealand
- Last T20I: 2 October 2012 v South Africa
- T20I shirt no.: 55

Domestic team information
- Years: Team
- 2001/02–2015/16: Tamil Nadu
- 2008–2010: Chennai Super Kings (squad no. 55)
- 2008/09: Wellington
- 2011–2013: Kolkata Knight Riders (squad no. 55)
- 2014: Kings XI Punjab (squad no. 55)

Career statistics
Competition	Test	ODI	T20I	FC
Matches	8	30	5	106
Runs scored	51	120	–	1,202
Batting average	5.66	12.00	–	12.14
100s/50s	0/0	0/0	–	0/0
Top score	35	21*	–	49*
Balls bowled	1,756	1,447	96	18,299
Wickets	27	34	10	330
Bowling average	37.18	39.52	12.10	26.10
5 wickets in innings	1	0	0	16
10 wickets in match	0	0	0	4
Best bowling	5/76	4/48	3/19	7/42
Catches/stumpings	1/–	11/–	0/–	38/–
Medal record
Men's Cricket
Representing India
ACC Asia Cup
Runner-up	2004 Sri Lanka
- Source: ESPNcricinfo, 5 May 2024

Lakshmipathy Balaji (born 27 September 1981) is an Indian cricket coach and former international cricketer. He was a right-arm fast medium bowler. He represented the Indian cricket team and was part of the Indian team that finished as runners-up in the 2004 Asia Cup. He played for Tamil Nadu and South Zone in domestic cricket.

In November 2002, he made his One Day International debut against West Indies. He made his Test debut against New Zealand in October 2003. He played the last of his eight Test matches against Pakistan in March 2005, finishing with 27 wickets. He played 30 ODIs for India until 2009, taking 34 wickets. Later he played eight Twenty 20 Internationals.

He played for the Chennai Super Kings in the Indian Premier League from 2008 to 2010, winning the 2010 Indian Premier League and Champions League Twenty20. He also played for Kolkata Knight Riders from 2011 to 2013, winning the 2012 Indian Premier League and, in 2014, for Kings XI Punjab. After his retirement from all forms of cricket in 2016, he served as the bowling coach of the Knight Riders in 2017 and the Super Kings from 2018 to 2022.

== Early and personal life ==
Lakshmipathy Balaji was born on 27 September 1981 in Madras, Tamil Nadu. He married Priya Thalur in 2013.

== International career ==
After making his debut for Tamil Nadu during the 2001–02 Ranji Trophy, Balaji was selected for the Indian national cricket team in 2002. In November 2002, he made his ODI debut against West Indies in the fifth match of the series at Vadodara. He went wicket less in four overs as India lost the match by five wickets. He did not play another international match before his test debut against New Zealand in October 2003 at Ahmedabad. He took his first and only wicket in the match, which ended in a draw. In the next match of the series, he went wicket-less. In January 2004, he was part of the Indian team that played a tri-series with Australia and Zimbabwe in Australia. He played all the 10 matches and finished as the fourth highest wicket taker in the series with 13 wickets.

Following his performance in Australia, he was selected for the Indian team that toured Pakistan in March–April 2004. He played in all the three test matches and finished as the second highest wicket taker with 12 wickets, leading India to a series victory. In the subsequent ODI series, which was also won by India, Balaji took six wickets in five matches. He was part of the Indian team that finished as runners-up in the 2004 Asia Cup but took just three wickets from four matches. Balaji played two ODIs in the 2004 Videocon Cup tri-series with Australia and Pakistan, taking six wickets to finish as the leading wicket taker. He played two matches during the Indian team, taking two wickets. During the subsequent visit of Pakistan in March 2005, Balaji played all the three test matches, the final match of which was the last of his career. He took nine wickets in the first match of the series including his career best of 5/76 in the first innings. He finished as the third highest wicket taker of the series which ended in a draw. In the subsequent ODI series, he took just three wickets in four matches, which resulted in an Indian defeat.

In 2005, Balaji suffered a stress fracture, which got exaggerated as he continued to play with injury. Subsequent injuries ruled him out of playing cricket for more than a year. Balaji made his return to cricket in 2007 and after a strong 2008-09 domestic season where helped Tamil Nadu reach the Ranji Trophy semifinals, he was called up to the Indian ODI squad in January 2009. Balaji played the final match of the series against Sri Lanka, which turned out to be final ODI match of his international career. In February, BCCI announced that Balaji had been dropped from the ODI squad for the New Zealand tour but had been selected for the test squad. But he did not play any matches in the series.

Balaji made his T20I debut against New Zealand at his home ground in Chennai on 11 September 2012. Subsequently, he was selected in the Indian squad for the 2012 ICC World Twenty20. He played four matches in the tournament including his last international match against South Africa. He took nine wickets to finish as the fourth highest wicket taker despite playing only four matches as India crashed out of the tournament in the group stage.

== Indian Premier League ==
On 29 March 2008, Balaji was signed by Chennai Super Kings (CSK) to play in the inaugural edition of the Indian Premier League. On 10 May 2008, he picked up the tournament's first hat-trick in the match against Kings XI Punjab in Chennai, finishing with a match-winning five-wicket haul and earning his first Man of the Match award. He played 29 matches across three seasons for CSK, taking 31 wickets. He was part of the squad that won the 2010 Indian Premier League and Champions League Twenty20. Ahead of the 2011 season, he was purchased by Kolkata Knight Riders in the IPL auction. He took 33 wickets in 35 matches across three seasons. He won the 2012 Indian Premier League title with Knight Riders, defeating his former team Super Kings in the finals. In his final season of the IPL, he played for Kings XI Punjab, taking 12 wickets in nine matches.

== Coaching career ==
After his retirement from all forms of cricket in 2016, he was appointed as bowling coach and mentor by Kolkata Knight Riders for the 2017 Indian Premier League season. For the 2018 season, he was appointed as the bowling coach of Chennai Super Kings. He resigned from the post in 2022, citing personal reasons, but continued to work for the Super Kings Academy.
