= Shib Paul =

Indian cricketer (born 1981)

Shib Sankar Paul (born 4 November 1981, Tufanganj) is an Indian first-class cricketer. A member of the Bengal cricket team, Paul is a right arm fast bowler of a tall and bulky frame and debuted in the 2000/01 season. A regular in the Indian A side, he was part of India's Test squad for the 4th Test against Australia in 2004/05.Paul was an integral part of the Bengal line up during his long and illustrious career. He was also a regular feature in the India A line up and occasionally in the Board President's XI sides who played against touring overseas teams.

In June 2016 he announced his retirement from all forms of cricket. He also has his Own cricket academy named "Shib Shankar Paul Cricket Academy" in Baghajatin, Kolkata.

Since then he has actively taken up the coaching role and coached Mizoram U-23 side for the 2018–19 season and now has been appointed as the head coach of Bengal Women's cricket team for the 2019–20 season.
