= South African cricket team in India in 2004–05 =

South Africa cricket team in India in 2004/05
	India	South Africa
- Dates: 14 November – 2 December 2004
Captains	Sourav Ganguly	Graeme Smith

Test series
- Result: India won the 2-match series 1–0
Most runs	Virender Sehwag (262)	Jacques Kallis (241)
Most wickets	Harbhajan Singh (13)	Makhaya Ntini (8)
- Player of the series: Virender Sehwag (Ind)

The South Africa national cricket team visited India in 2004 for a 2-match test series. India won the test series with 1–0. Indian cricketer Virender Sehwag scored 262 run in two test and becomes player of the series. Harbhajan Singh took highest number of wicket 13.

== Squads ==
Tests
India	South Africa
Sourav Ganguly (c); Gautam Gambhir; Virender Sehwag; Rahul Dravid; Sachin Tendulkar; VVS Laxman; Mohammad Kaif; Dinesh Karthik (wk); Anil Kumble; Harbhajan Singh; Murali Kartik; Zaheer Khan; Irfan Pathan; Ashish Nehra	Graeme Smith (c); Hashim Amla; Zander de Bruyn; Boeta Dippenaar; Andrew Hall; Jacques Kallis; Makhaya Ntini; Justin Ontong; Robin Peterson; Shaun Pollock; Jacques Rudolph; Thami Tsolekile (wk); Alfonso Thomas; Martin van Jaarsveld

== Tests ==
=== 1st Test ===
20–24 November
(scorecard)

South Africa	v	India
510/9 dec (190.4 overs); Andrew Hall 163 (454); Anil Kumble 6/131 (54 overs)		466 (134.4 overs); Virender Sehwag 164 (228); Makhaya Ntini 3/135 (39 overs)
169/4 (64 overs); Andrew Hall 47 (100); Murali Kartik 2/17 (14 overs)

Match Drawn
Green Park, Kanpur
Umpires: Daryl Harper (Aus), Simon Taufel (Aus) & Arani Jayaprakash(Ind)
Player of the match: Andrew Hall (SA)

- South Africa won the toss and elected to bat
- Test Debuts: Zander de Bruyn & Thami Tsolekile (SA)

=== 2nd Test ===
28 November – 2 December
(scorecard)

South Africa	v	India
305 (121.3 overs); Jacques Kallis 121 (259); Irfan Pathan 3/72 (31 overs)		411 (150.1 overs); Virender Sehwag 88 (118); Makhaya Ntini 4/112 (44 overs)
222 (74.4 overs); Graeme Smith 71 (124); Harbhajan Singh 7/87 (30 overs)		120/2 (39.4 overs); Rahul Dravid 47 (104); Makhaya Ntini 1/11 (4 overs)

India won by 8 wickets
Eden Gardens, Kolkata
Umpires: Daryl Harper (Aus), Simon Taufel (Aus) & Ivaturi Shivram (Ind)
Player of the match: Harbhajan Singh (Ind)

- South Africa won the toss and elected to bat
- Test Debuts: Hashim Amla (SA)

== Statistics ==
=== Batting ===
Most runs

No	Team	Player	Matches	Innings	Runs	HS	Avg	SR	Balls Faced
1	(India)	Virender Sehwag	2	3	262	164	87.33	71.98	364
2	(South Africa)	Jacques Kallis	2	4	241	121	80.33	41.76	577
3	(South Africa)	Andrew Hall	2	4	217	163	54.25	37.22	583
4	(India)	Rahul Dravid	2	3	181	80	90.50	34.15	530
5	(South Africa)	Graeme Smith	2	4	155	71	38.75	53.08	292

=== Bowling ===
Most wickets

No	Team	Player	Matches	Wickets	Runs	BBI	BBM	Econ
1	(India)	Harbhajan Singh	2	13	307	7/87	9/141	2.73
2	(India)	Anil Kumble	2	10	341	6/131	6/183	2.44
3	(South Africa)	Makhaya Ntini	2	8	258	4/112	5/123	2.96
4	(South Africa)	Andrew Hall	2	4	163	3/93	3/93	2.92
5	(South Africa)	Shaun Pollock	2	4	223	2/100	2/100	2.47
