= Harbhajan Singh =

Indian cricketer and politician (born 1980)

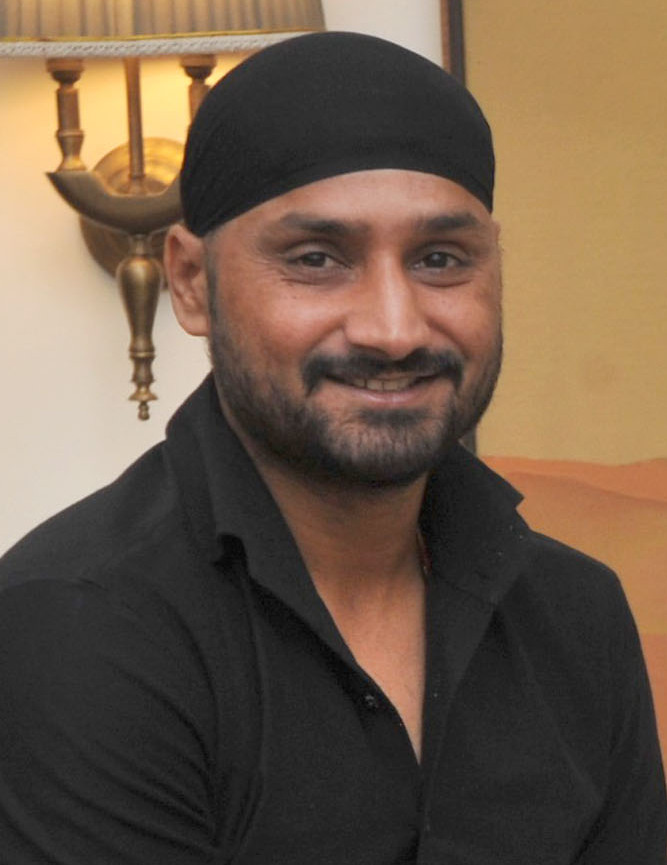
- Singh in 2015

Member of Parliament, Rajya Sabha
- Incumbent
- Assumed office 9 April 2022
- Preceded by: Sukhdev Singh Dhindsa
- Constituency: Punjab

Personal details
- Born: 3 July 1980 (age 46) Jalandhar, Punjab, India
- Party: Bharatiya Janata Party (since 2026)
- Other political affiliations: Aam Aadmi Party (2022–2026)
- Spouse: Geeta Basra (m. 2015)
- Children: 2
- Occupation: Cricketer; commentator; actor; politician
- Cricket career

Cricket information
- Batting: Right-handed
- Bowling: Right-arm off-spin
- Role: Bowler

International information
- National side: India (1998–2016)
- Test debut (cap 220): 25 March 1998 v Australia
- Last Test: 12 August 2015 v Sri Lanka
- ODI debut (cap 113): 17 April 1998 v New Zealand
- Last ODI: 25 October 2015 v South Africa
- ODI shirt no.: 3
- T20I debut (cap 3): 1 December 2006 v South Africa
- Last T20I: 4 March 2016 v UAE
- T20I shirt no.: 3

Domestic team information
- Years: Team
- 1997/98–2018/19: Punjab
- 2005–2007: Surrey
- 2008–2017: Mumbai Indians (squad no. 3)
- 2012: Essex
- 2018–2020: Chennai Super Kings (squad no. 27)
- 2021: Kolkata Knight Riders (squad no. 27)

Career statistics
Competition	Test	ODI	T20I	FC
Matches	103	236	28	198
Runs scored	2,224	1,237	108	4,255
Batting average	18.23	13.30	13.50	19.16
100s/50s	2/9	0/0	0/0	2/15
Top score	115	49	21	115
Balls bowled	28,580	12,479	612	48,055
Wickets	417	269	25	780
Bowling average	32.46	33.35	25.32	29.04
5 wickets in innings	25	3	0	41
10 wickets in match	5	0	0	8
Best bowling	8/84	5/31	4/12	8/84
Catches/stumpings	42/–	71/–	7/–	100/–
Medal record
Men's cricket
Representing India
ICC Cricket World Cup
Runner-up	2003 South Africa-Zimbabwe-Kenya
Winner	2011 India-Bangladesh-Sri Lanka
ICC Champions Trophy
Winner	2002 Sri Lanka
T20 World Cup
Winner	2007 South Africa
Asia Cup
Runner-up	2004 Sri Lanka
Winner	2010 Sri Lanka
Winner	2016 Bangladesh
- Source: ESPNcricinfo, 17 April 2019

Harbhajan Singh (born 3 July 1980) is an Indian politician and former cricketer. He currently serves as a Member of Parliament in Rajya Sabha. Harbhajan played on the teams that won the 2007 T20 World Cup, 2011 Cricket World Cup, and 2002 ICC Champions Trophy, along with Sri Lanka.

Harbhajan played for the Indian national cricket team from 1998 to 2016 as an off spin bowler. Domestically, he played for the Punjab cricket team; and in the Indian Premier League for the Mumbai Indians, Chennai Super Kings, and Kolkata Knight Riders. He is also a film actor, a television celebrity, and a cricket commentator.

== Early life and training ==
Born to a Sikh Ramgarhia family, Harbhajan is the only son of Sardar Sardev Singh Plaha, a freedom fighter who owned a ball bearing and valve factory. He grew up with five sisters.

Harbhajan was trained as a batsman by his first coach, Charanjit Singh Bhullar, but converted to spin bowling after his coach's untimely death saw him under the tutelage of Davinder Arora.

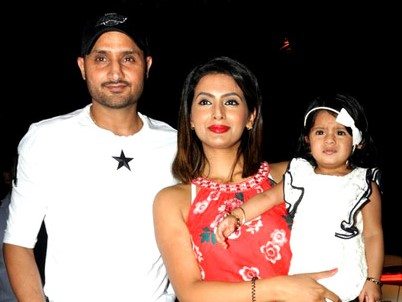
Singh with wife Geeta Basra at Rakesh Roshan's birthday bash in 2017

== Career ==
=== Domestic ===
Harbhajan played for Punjab Under-16s at the age of 15 years and 4 months in November of the 1995–96 season, and took 7/46 and 5/138 in his debut, against Haryana, setting up a nine-wicket win. He scored 56 in his next match against Delhi and then took 11/79 in his third match against Himachal Pradesh, orchestrating an innings win. He ended with 32 wickets at 15.15 and 96 runs at 48.00 in four matches. He was rewarded with being selected for North Zone Under-16s, a team that represents all of northern India for a one-day series, in which he took two wickets at 43.50 in four matches and scored 18 runs. At the end of the season, he was called into the national Under-19 team at the age of 15 years and 9 months for a youth One Day International against South Africa. He took 1/19 from seven overs, with the Indian team winning.

In 1996–97, Harbhajan was promoted to the Punjab Under-19s and he took 15 wickets at 20.20 in three matches, although he managed only two runs with the bat. This included match figures of 8/54 in an innings win over Jammu and Kashmir.

Harbhajan made his first-class cricket debut in late 1997 against Services, during the 1997–98 Ranji Trophy season. He took a total of 3/35 in an innings win but was dropped back to the Under-19s the following week. He then took 5/75 and 7/44 in two matches to earn a recall to the senior team. He then took a total of 7/123 in the next two matches for Punjab to earn selection to the North Zone in the Duleep Trophy competition.

Harbhajan's season was interrupted when he represented India at the Under-19 World Cup in January 1998. He played in six matches, taking eight wickets at 24.75 with a best of 3/5 against Kenya.

After returning to India, he played in three more Ranji Trophy matches, and from a total of six matches, he took 18 wickets at an average of 22.50, ranking outside the top 20 in wicket taking. He took a total of 5/131 as North lost to East Zone by five wickets.

Harbhajan played the full 2009 Indian Premier League season in South Africa, taking 12 wickets at 21.33 with an economy rate of 5.81 in 13 matches. He was one of the most economical bowlers in the competition, and took 1/9 in four overs against Punjab to win the man-of-the-match award. He ended the season with 4/17 against Delhi, but it was not enough to prevent a four-wicket defeat.

During the 2010 IPL season, he finished as the Mumbai Indian's leading wicket taker with 17 wickets with an average of 22.17, helping his team to reach the final. Harbhajan opened the bowling during the final vs the Chennai Super Kings but went wicketless. He was promoted as a pinch hitter to number 4 in the batting order but could only contribute 1 run in the defeat.

Harbhajan had a largely successful 2011 IPL as part of an effective Mumbai Indians bowling attack. He took 5 for 18, against the Chennai Super Kings during the round-robin part of the tournament, which are the best bowling figures of any player at the Wankhede Stadium in the IPL. However, the team faltered during the playoffs as they lost back-to-back matches to the Kolkata Knight Riders and Chennai Super Kings, to miss out on the final.

After injuries, he returned to competitive cricket to lead the Mumbai Indians to the 2011 Champions League Twenty20 title, but fell out of favor with the national selectors. He was not chosen for the home series squad against England, in October, and West Indies, in November and December. The Mumbai Indians won their first ever championship under his captaincy, winning the Champions League by 31 runs. Harbhajan was man-of-the-match for his contribution.

He went on to play the 2012 IPL, which was not successful for him, but took his team to the semi-final while being captain. Harbhajan went to play for Essex in England but was not selected for the Sri Lankan tour before the 2012 ICC World Twenty20. In his debut match for Essex against Gloucestershire, Harbhajan did not take any wicket on 12 July 2012, conceding 33 runs in his 12 overs. He was acquired by the Chennai Super Kings in 2018 after 10 years with Mumbai Indians. On 20 January 2021, Harbajan announced the end of his contract with the Chennai Super Kings. He was signed by the Kolkata Knight Riders during the 2021 IPL auction for a sum of 2 crore rupees.

Harbhajan Singh is the captain of the Manipal Tigers in Legends League Cricket, who won the 2023 title.

After taking eight wickets in his next two Ranji matches, Harbhajan was selected to tour Australia in 1999–2000, as the second spinner. He did not play in the Tests, with India opting to field only Anil Kumble. Australia whitewashed India 3–0, and Harbhajan struggled in his only first-class outing against Tasmania, taking 0/141, a portent of future unsuccessful tours to Australia.

Harbhajan was not part of the ODI squad for the Australian tour and upon returning to India in early 2000 needed strong first-class results to maintain his Test position. He went wicketless against Hyderabad, and was selected for the Board President's XI match against the touring South Africans. He took 2/88 and 2/59 and scored 38 and 39 to prevent the hosts being bowled out and defeated, but was dropped as the second slow bowler, as Murali Kartik became Kumble's spinning partner. Harbhajan returned to domestic action, taking 24 wickets in Punjab's remaining four first-class matches. He ended the Indian season with 46 first-class wickets at 26.23.

In mid-2000 an opportunity arose when Harbhajan was selected to be in the first group of trainees sent to the National Cricket Academy to study under Erapalli Prasanna and Srinivas Venkataraghavan, two off-spin bowlers from the Indian spin quartet of the 1970s. However, his behaviour did not conform to requirements, and he was expelled on disciplinary grounds. His sponsorship job with Indian Airlines was also reviewed as a result of his indiscipline. Harbhajan later admitted that he had been at fault at this point in his career.

At the start of 2000–01, following his run-ins with Indian cricket administrators, there was nothing to indicate that Harbhajan's chances of national selection had improved. Despite Kumble being injured, Harbhajan was again overlooked, as Kartik, Sunil Joshi, and debutant Sarandeep Singh were entrusted with the spin bowling duties in Test matches against Bangladesh and Zimbabwe.

During the first half of the season, still exiled from international play, Harbhajan continued to pick up wickets on the domestic circuit. In five Ranji Trophy matches, he claimed 28 wickets at 13.96. He scored 3/29 and 3/39 against Himachal Pradesh, 2/53 and 5/88 against Jammu and Kashmir, 4/77 and 2/33 against Haryana, and 5/40 against Services in the first four matches, all of which ended in innings wins for Punjab. He then took a total of 4/32 in a 199-run win over Delhi. Harbhajan's batting, which had rarely been productive up to this point in his career, also improved. He scored a career-best 84 against Haryana and added 52 against Services, aggregating 207 runs at 51.75. After taking eight wickets at 21.12 in six one-dayers, Harbhajan was selected for North in the Duleep Trophy, but his early-season form deserted him. He took five wickets at 39.00 in two matches, although he did continue his productive run with the bat, scoring 130 runs at 32.50 with three scores above 35. In October 2019, Harbhajan allowed his name to be drafted into The Hundred at a base price of $100,000, risking his international standing.

=== International ===
==== Debut ====
Despite the superior statistics of other bowlers in domestic cricket, Harbhajan was selected for the Indian Board President's XI to play the touring Australian cricket team ahead of the Tests. He managed only 1/127, and was ignored for the first two Tests before being selected to make his Test debut in the Third Test against Australia in Bangalore, where he scored 4 not-out and a duck, and recorded the modest match figures of 2/136 as Australia won the match by eight wickets. He was subsequently overlooked for the triangular ODI tournament in India that followed the Tests, involving Zimbabwe in addition to Australia, but was selected for all group matches in the triangular tournament that followed soon after in Sharjah, where he made his ODI debut against New Zealand. He took 1/32 from ten overs on debut as India narrowly won by 15 runs. He then took 3/41 in the next match, a defeat against Australia, but then struggled in the second qualifying match against the same team, taking 1/63 in eight overs. He was subsequently dropped for the final against Australia, which India won, and ended the series with five wickets at 33.20 at an economy rate of 4.36.

Having made little success in this phase of his international career, averaging 37.75 per Test wicket to date, and overlooked by selectors, Harbhajan faced a difficult decision. His father had recently died; as the family's only son, Harbhajan was now obliged to support his mother and unmarried sisters. He contemplated quitting cricket and moving to the United States to drive trucks for a living. After being out of the team for more than 12 months, there was little overt indication of the sudden rise that would occur in his cricketing career only a few months later.

Harbhajan was omitted from the team during a home triangular ODI tournament against Bangladesh and Kenya, after taking 0/18 from four overs in his only match of the tournament against the former opponent, but was recalled for the Singer Trophy in Sri Lanka, which also involved New Zealand. Playing in all five matches, Harbhajan claimed eight wickets with an average of 24.12 and economy of 4.38, taking at least one scalp in each match. Harbhajan was retained for the final and took 1/57, his worst return for the series, in an Indian win. After being omitted for the Sahara Cup series against Pakistan in Toronto, Harbhajan played on a weakened Indian team at the 1998 Commonwealth Games in Kuala Lumpur, Malaysia. The matches were not given ODI status by the ICC, and India chose to send their better players to the Sahara Cup instead. India won their second match against Canada and had a no-result against Antigua. Harbhajan managed only a total of 1/48 from 11 overs. The Indians then needed to beat a full-strength Australian outfit to win their group and progress to the semi-finals. Harbhajan was punished and went wicketless, conceding 50 runs in eight overs as Australia won by 146 runs, knocking India out of contention.

Harbhajan was then recalled to the first-choice team and took five wickets at an average of 22.60 at 3.89 runs an over from three matches on a tour to Zimbabwe, in what would prove to be his last ODI appearances for India for more than two years. In all, he took 18 ODI wickets at an average of 27.2 during the 1998.

After taking 2/38 and 3/60 in an innings win in a tour match, Harbhajan was retained in the Test team, taking 2/42 and 3/63 in the only Test on the Zimbabwe tour. He was unbeaten on 15 in the second innings as the final wicket fell and India succumbed to a 51-run defeat.

Returning to India, Harbhajan started the 1998–99 domestic season well, taking 3/54 and 5/39 in an innings win over Services, before following up with 6/69 and 1/93 in the next match against Delhi, claiming his first five-wicket innings haul. He then took 6/63 and scored 31 in the first innings of a match for the Board PResident's XI against a touring West Indies A, and was taken on the tour of New Zealand in December. In a tour match against Central Districts, Harbhajan struggled, aggregating 2/112. He only played in one Test during the tour, and went wicketless, conceding 72 runs. Upon returning to India, he took a total of 3/158 for India A in a match against the touring Pakistanis ahead of the Tests. After being omitted from the First Test loss in Chennai, he was recalled for the latter two matches against Pakistan, and took five wickets at 34.60 as the matches were split. He then took 3/127 in a high-scoring draw against Sri Lanka. In all, he claimed 13 wickets with an average of 36.8 in five Tests for the season. When he was free of international fixtures for the season, he played in the Ranji Trophy matches, claiming 27 wickets at an average of 24.59 in five matches, including his first five-wicket haul at the first-class level. He also registered his maiden first-class fifty, scoring an unbeaten 67 against Tamil Nadu cricket team.

Harbhajan took four wickets at 33.00 during the one-dayers during the season and was overlooked for the ODI team for the whole season and missed selection for the 1999 Cricket World Cup. In September 2003, he played for India A in a one-day series against their Australian counterparts in Los Angeles. Harbhajan took eight wickets at 17.00 at 3.77 runs an over in the five matches, with a best of 3/38.

After taking 4/91 against the touring team for the Board President's XI at the start of the season, Harbhajan managed to retain his Test position for the late 1999 home series against New Zealand, as India fielded a three-pronged spin attack on dusty tracks, taking six wickets at an average of 32.66 as the hosts prevailed 1–0 in the two Tests.

==== 2001 Border-Gavaskar Trophy ====
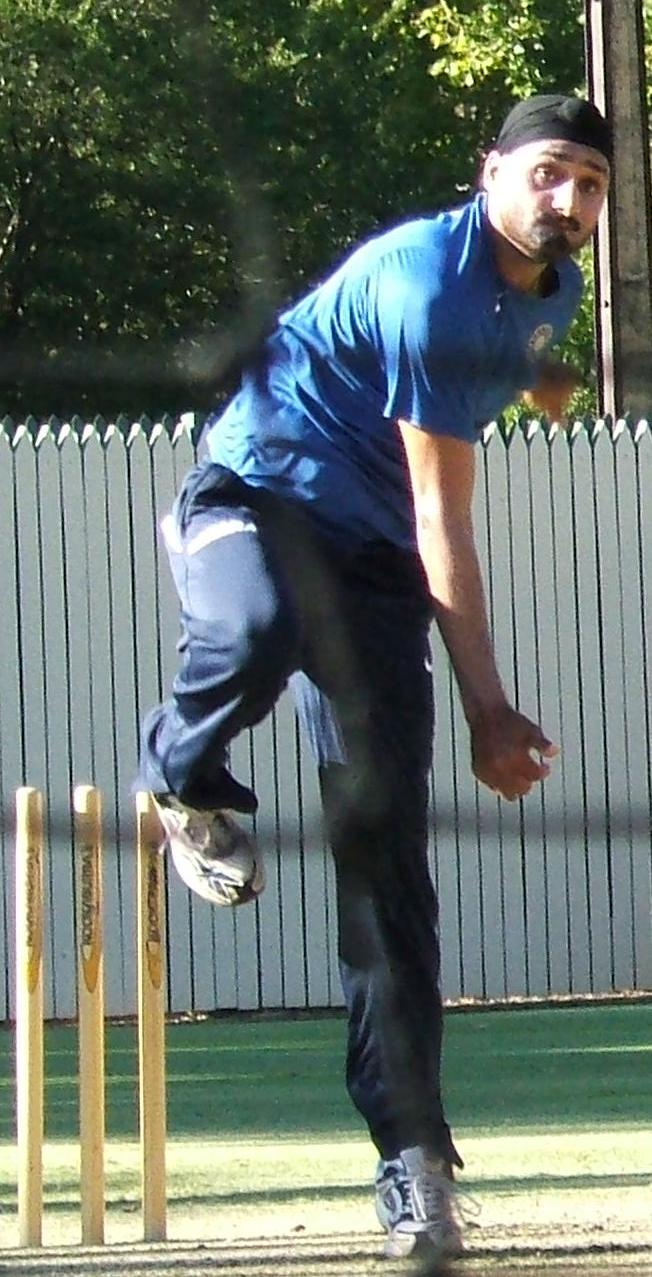
Harbhajan practice-bowling in the nets

In March 2001, with Kumble injured before the home series against the visiting Australians, Harbhajan, whose previous best Test figures were only 3/30, was the only capped spinner on the Indian team for the First Test. He had been recalled after captain Sourav Ganguly publicly called for his inclusion on the team. He was to lead the spin attack against an Australian team which had set a world record with 16 consecutive Test victories, and was searching for its first series victory on Indian soil since 1969. In a warm-up match for India A, Harbhajan had taken 2/63 and 3/81 against the Australians. Harbhajan started well in the First Test in Mumbai, taking three quick wickets in a spell of 3/8, to reduce Australia to 99/5 in response to India's first innings of 176. However, a counter-attacking 197-run partnership between Matthew Hayden and Adam Gilchrist in just 32 overs, saw Harbhajan concede 103 runs from his last 17 overs, to end with 4/121. Despite being struck for many sixes, it was still Harbhajan's best statistical analysis at Test level. Australia eventually proceeded to a crushing 10-wicket victory, their sixteenth consecutive Test victory in succession. This test match has been called by many the greatest that has ever been played, in light of the nature of India's win under difficult circumstances.

With leading paceman Javagal Srinath ruled out of the series with a finger injury during the First Test, the teams met for the Second Test in Kolkata, with an even greater burden on Harbhajan. Public opinion was skeptical about India's chances of stopping Australia's winning streak, with former captain Bishan Bedi lamenting the demise of Indian cricket. Australia were again in control on the first day, having scored 193/1, with Hayden having struck Harbhajan out of the attack. Harbhajan fought back to reduce Australia to 252/7, taking five wickets in the final session, including Ricky Ponting, Gilchrist, and Shane Warne in successive balls to become the first Indian to claim a Test hat-trick. After a prolonged wait for the third umpire to adjudicate whether Sadagoppan Ramesh had managed to catch Warne before the ball hit the ground, the near-capacity crowd at Eden Gardens erupted when he was ruled out. Harbhajan eventually finished with 7/123 as Australia were bowled out for 445. India batted poorly and were forced to follow-on, but a 376-run partnership between V. V. S. Laxman and Rahul Dravid, who batted together for an entire day, allowed India to set Australia an imposing target of 384 to win on the final day. Australia appeared to be safely batting out the match for a draw, until losing 7/56 in the final session, collapsing from 166/3 to be bowled out for 212. Harbhajan claimed four of the wickets, to finish with 6/73 for the innings and a match tally of 13/196. India ended Australia's 16-match world record winning streak, and became only the third team to win a Test after being forced to follow on (Australia having lost all three of those matches).

The teams arrived in Chennai for the deciding Third Test, and Australia's batsmen again seized control after winning the toss, reaching 340/3 on the second morning. Then, Australian captain Steve Waugh padded away a delivery from Harbhajan. The ball spun back into Waugh's stumps, who pushed the ball away with his glove, becoming only the sixth batsman in Tests to be ruled out because he "handled the ball". Waugh's dismissal instigated another Australian batting collapse, losing 6 wickets for 51 runs to be bowled out for 391, with Harbhajan taking all six in a spell of 6/26, to finish with 7/133. After India's batsmen gained a first-innings lead of 110, the Australian batsmen were again unable to cope with Harbhajan in the second innings, who took 8/84 to end with match figures of 15/217. India appeared to be heading for an easy victory at 101/2 chasing 155, before losing 6/50 to be at 151/8. Then, Harbhajan walked to the crease, and struck the winning runs.

He was named man of the match and man of the series, having taken 32 wickets at 17.03 for the series, when none of his teammates managed more than three. The Wisden 100 study conducted by Wisden in 2002 rated all four of Harbhajan's efforts in the Second and Third Tests as being in the top 100 bowling performances of all time, the most for any bowler. He paid tribute to his father, who had died just six months earlier. His performance led to him usurping Anil Kumble's position as India's first-choice spinner.

==== Recalled ====
Harbhajan's Test success saw him recalled to the ODI team after more than two years. He was unable to reproduce his Test form against Australia, managing only four wickets at an average of 59.25 and economy rate of 5.04. His best performance was a 3/37 in a 118-run win in the third match, and a cameo batting performance of 46 runs from 34 balls, including three sixes, in a losing run chase in the fourth fixture. He was dropped from the ODI team during a subsequent triangular tournament in Zimbabwe in 2001 after only managing two wickets at 69.00 in four matches although he had been economical at 3.63 runs an over. Harbhajan was also unable to maintain his form in the Test series against Zimbabwe. Harbhajan began the tour well, with 13 wickets in two warm-up matches, including a match haul of 10/80 against the CFX Academy, but could not repeat such performances in the Tests. He took eight wickets at 29.12 in the two-Test series, which was drawn 1–1, but did manage to post his first Test half-century, reaching 66 in the First Test in Bulawayo, before scoring 31 in the first innings of the Second Test as the Indian batsmen struggled and ceded their series lead. The Indians subsequently toured Sri Lanka in mid-2001, enjoying spinning wickets similar to those in India. Harbhajan managed to establish himself in the ODI team with eleven wickets at 21.18 at the low economy rate of 3.42 in seven matches in the ODI tournament with the hosts and New Zealand. Ironically, his best performances, in which he conceded less than 30 runs in his ten overs three times, all ended in Indian defeats. In contrast to his ODI improvement, Harbhajan's Test form deteriorated further, yielding only four wickets at 73.00 in three Tests, while Sri Lankan spinner Muttiah Muralitharan was named man of the series with 23 wickets, in what was billed as a contest between the world's two leading off-spinners. With the Tests locked at 1–1 Harbhajan managed only 2/185 in the Third Test as the hosts accumulated 6/610 declared and won by an innings. He scored 79 runs at 15.80 for the series.

Harbhajan was omitted from the Indian team in favour of Kumble as the first-choice spinner on the following tour of South Africa, only playing in the later matches when India fielded two spinners. Nevertheless, Harbhajan continued to do well in the ODIs, taking nine wickets at 20.44 in six matches at an economy rate of 3.53, winning his first man-of-the-match award in the ODI form, against South Africa in Bloemfontein, after taking 3/27 from his ten overs. He scored 62 runs at 15.50, including a rearguard 37 that was not enough to prevent an embarrassing 70-run loss to Kenya. After being omitted from the First Test, which India lost, his disciplinary problems continued when he was one of four Indian players fined and given a suspended one-match suspension for dissent and attempting to intimidate the umpire by over-appealing in the Second Test. India managed to draw the match, but Harbhajan struggled and took 1/89 and 2/79. The off spinner continued his poor overseas Test form in what would have been the Third Test. However, India defied the ICC by playing banned batsman Virender Sehwag, while Mike Denness, the match referee who handed down the penalties, was locked out of the stadium; so, the match was stripped of Test status. Harbhajan continued to be ineffective, taking only 1/104, although he showed resistance with the bat, scoring 29 and 30 when many specialist batsmen failed, as India slumped to an innings defeat.

Harbhajan's Test fortunes improved immediately upon the start of the 2001–02 international season in India. Playing in his first international match at his home ground in Mohali, Punjab, Harbhajan scored match figures of 7/110, including 5/51 in the first innings, to help India win the First Test by ten wickets against the touring English team. He continued his steady form throughout the series with another five-wicket haul in the Second Test in Ahmedabad, to end with thirteen wickets at 24.53 for the series, although he went wicketless in 27.1 overs in the Third and final Test. Harbhajan's good home form persisted in the Test matches against Zimbabwe, taking twelve wickets at 19.66 in two games. In the First Test, he took 4/46 in the second innings to seal an innings victory after going wicketless in the second innings. His 2/70 and 6/62 in the Second Test in Delhi saw him named man-of-the-match in a Test for the second time in his career. As in the first instance, he hit the winning runs, a straight-driven six, after India had lost six wickets and threatened to collapse in pursuit of a modest 122 for victory. He also performed strongly in the ODIs during the Indian season, taking twenty wickets at 19.75 in ten matches and taking his first five-wicket haul in ODIs. In the five matches against England, he took ten wickets at 20.10 at an economy rate of 4.27. His best result was a 5/43 in the last of these matches, but a late collapse handed the visitors a five-run win. He did better against the Zimbabweans, taking 10 wickets in five matches at an average of 19.40 and an economy rate of 4.06. This included a 4/33 in the final match. He also scored 39 runs without defeat for the series, including a 24 not-out as India were skittled for 191 in one match. As Harbhajan was ensconced in the Indian team for the first team, he only played in two Ranji Trophy matches for Punjab, taking 13 wickets at 20.01 and scoring 71 runs at 17.75.

Harbhajan's overseas difficulties returned during the tour of the West Indies in mid-2002. He injured his shoulder while fielding during a tour match, in which he started well with a total of 5/70, and was forced to miss the First Test in Guyana. After taking only six wickets at 38 upon his return to the team for the Second and Third Tests, he was dropped for the Fourth Test, but was recalled again for the Fifth Test at Sabina Park, after Kumble was injured. Despite taking improved match figures of 8/180, including 5/138 in the first innings, Harbhajan was unable to prevent an Indian defeat after the batting collapsed in the first innings. He claimed three wickets in the three match ODI series at 33.00, conceding 4.71 runs per over.

Despite his performance at Sabina Park, Harbhajan was dropped again when Kumble returned for the First Test on the tour to England at Lord's, where the hosts prevailed. India's coach John Wright later admitted that Harbhajan's omission had been a mistake. Harbhajan returned for the final three Tests with moderate success, taking 12 wickets at 34.16, improving as the English summer wore on. After claiming 3/175 in the drawn Second Test, he struck form in the tour match against Essex, taking 7/83 and 1/23. He then took 3/40 and 1/56 as India levelled the series in the Third Test at Headingley, before taking 5/115 in the first innings of the Fourth Test at The Oval, as well as managing his second Test half-century of 54 at Trent Bridge in the Second Test. He ended the series with 90 runs at 22.50. For the entire tour, Harbhajan aggregated 28 wickets at 27.60. Harbhajan had modest results in the Natwest Trophy. After being dropped after one wicketless match, he then took 4/46 against Sri Lanka in the last match before the final to ensure his retention, but went wicketless in the decider, which India won. He played in three ODIs and took four wickets at 37.25 at 4.96.

==== 2002 Champions Trophy ====
The 2002 ICC Champions Trophy in Sri Lanka at the end of the tour brought moderate results with six wickets at 30.66 at an economy rate of only 3.68, and a best of 3/27 from ten overs in the first-day, washed-out final against the host nation. Harbhajan helped restrict Sri Lanka to 5/244, but rain ended proceedings with India at 0/14. He then took 1/34 the next day during a replay of the final. This time the hosts made 7/222 and a downpour again thwarted the players, with India at 1/38 when play was called off and the trophy shared.

As was the case in the previous season, Harbhajan's return to Indian soil coincided with an improvement in results. He took 1/37 and 7/48 in an innings victory at Mumbai in the First Test against the West Indies, and then contributed match figures of 3/56, 4/79 and 37 in an eight-wicket victory in Chennai which saw him named man-of-the-match. A haul of 5/115 in the Third Test at Calcutta was the best in a high scoring match, and with 20 wickets at 16.75 and 69 runs at 17.25, Harbhajan was named as the man-of-the-series. He was unable to transfer his performances to the ODI format, taking only five wickets at 49.00 against the same team at an economy rate of 5.44. Harbhajan took only five wickets at 18.80 in the subsequent Test tour to New Zealand, in a series where five pace bowlers averaged less than 20 on green, seaming tracks. India lost the series 2–0 and Harbhajan's 20 and 18 in the Second Test amounted for more than 15% of India's match total. Harbhajan then took 1/56 in one ODI before heading for his World Cup debut in South Africa.

==== 2003 World Cup ====
Harbhajan had a mixed tournament at the 2003 Cricket World Cup, taking 11 wickets at 30.45 with an economy rate of 3.92 in ten matches. He was the first-choice spinner and played in all matches but one, being dropped for the victory against arch-rivals Pakistan in the group phase. His counterpart, Kumble, played in only three matches. Harbhajan was steady throughout the tournament, never taking more than two wickets in a match, and never conceding more than 42 runs from his quota of ten overs, except in the two matches against Australia, who went through the tournament without defeat. In the group match, Harbhajan had the second highest score, with a counter-attacking 28, as India collapsed for 125; but when it was his turn to bowl, the Australians attacked him and scored 49 runs from his 44 balls without losing a wicket in a decisive nine-wicket win. In the final, Ganguly elected to field; and Harbhajan was the only Indian bowler to take a wicket, taking 2/49 from eight overs. In contrast, the Australians scored at 7.38 runs per over from the other bowlers to reach 2/359, the highest total in a World Cup final, and win by 125 runs. He was the fourth leading wicket taker for India overall and his tournament bowling average was worse than those of Zaheer Khan, Ashish Nehra, and Javagal Srinath. He finished the season with six wickets at 14.00 at 3.65 runs per over in three matches in an ODI tournament in Bangladesh, where he was fined for abusing an umpire.

==== Finger injury ====
After experiencing pains in his spinning finger during the World Cup, Harbhajan was scheduled to undergo surgery in mid-2003 in Australia, but the surgery was delayed as he sought to play through the pain. He underwent physiotherapy in lieu of surgery and was declared fit for a two-match Test series at home against New Zealand in late 2003. His performance was substantially worse than his previous displays on Indian soil, taking only six wickets at an average of 50.00 as both matches ended in high-scoring draws. Aside from his debut series, it was his worst series bowling average on Indian soil. Despite a triangular ODI series against New Zealand and Australia in which he managed only four wickets at 40.50 in four matches and spent time in the sidelines, the Indian team attempted to manage his injury rather than have his finger operated on, and took him on the 2003–04 tour of Australia. As with his previous visit four years earlier, Harbhajan had an unhappy time, taking 2/159 in a tour match against Victoria. After an ineffective 1/169 in the First Test at Brisbane, his injury worsened, and he underwent major finger surgery, which was predicted to sideline him for five months. Kumble replaced him and took 24 wickets in the remaining three Tests in stark contrast to Harbhajan's struggles in Australia. Kumble bowled India to victory in the following Test against Pakistan in Multan, taking 6/71 to reclaim his position as the No. 1 spinner.

After a seven-month layoff, Harbhajan returned to represent India in ODIs in the Asia Cup in July 2004, where he took four wickets at 39.75 in four matches at 3.97 runs per over. His performance improved on the tour to England for an ODI series against England and the 2004 ICC Champions Trophy, taking eight wickets at 14.00, conceding only 2.80 runs an over, including 3/28 against England and 3/33 against Kenya and hitting an unbeaten 41 against England at The Oval as India's batting collapsed to a substantial defeat.

Harbhajan made his Test return against Australia, who were again seeking their first series win on Indian soil since 1969 in the late-2004 home series. Harbhajan took 5/146 in the first innings and 6/78 in the second innings in addition to making a run out to reduce Australia from 103/3 to 228 all out. Despite this, India required 457 in their second innings to win, slumping to 125/8 before Harbhajan (with 42) and Irfan Pathan helped India to reach 239 after a rearguard counter-attack, still a 217-run loss. Harbhajan was less effective in the drawn Second Test in Chennai, with match figures of 5/198, which was washed out with India still needing 210 more runs on the last day with all ten wickets in hand. Harbhajan then withdrew from the Third Test in Nagpur, due to illness. Australia won the match easily, clinching the series. Harbhajan returned for the final Test in Mumbai. After failing to take a wicket in the first innings, he claimed 5/29 in the second to help India bowl Australia out for 93 and claim a dramatic 14-run victory. Harbhajan ended the series with 21 wickets at 24.00 and 69 runs at 13.80.

A Test series in India against South Africa followed, with Harbhajan taking match figures of 4/166 in the drawn First Test in Kanpur, before producing a man-of-the-match performance in the Second Test in Calcutta to lead India to a 1–0 series win. After taking 2/54 in the first innings, he took 6/78 in the second, including South Africa's first five batsman to help dismiss the visitors for 222. This set up a run-chase of 117, which India reached with eight wickets in hand. Harbhajan was the leading wicket-taker for the series, with 13 victims at an average of 23.61. He ended 2004 with a quiet tour of Bangladesh, scoring a 47 in the Second Test and taking four wickets at 41.75 in two Tests and one wicket at 94 at an economy rate of 5.22 in two ODIs. He had a relatively light workload, bowling only 47.4 overs in the Tests, as Irfan Pathan frequently scythed through the Bangladeshi batsmen with the new ball, taking three five-wicket hauls. Harbhajan then returned to India and took a total of 6/172 in North Zone's seven-wicket win over South.

His performance in Bangladesh saw him dropped for the First Test in the early 2005 series against Pakistan on his home ground in Mohali, with Kumble being the only spinner selected on the pace-friendly surface. India were in control of the match for four days, and needed only four wickets on day five, but were unable to break the Pakistani lower-order until play was almost over and the visitors had taken a lead, and the match ended in a draw. Harbhajan was recalled for the Second Test in Calcutta and took match figures of 4/145 in an Indian victory. Despite taking 6/152 in a marathon 51-over spell in the first innings of the Third Test in Bangalore, Pakistan won the match to level the series after India collapsed on the final day. Harbhajan finished the series with 10 wickets at 33.20. His performance in the subsequent ODI series was even worse, managing only three wickets at 73.66 in five matches at an economy rate of 4.80. In spite of the poor end to the season, his performance in the year since finger surgery, in the long form of the game, saw him nominated for the 2005 ICC Test Player of the Year. Harbhajan spent the international off-season playing for Surrey in English county cricket, citing the improvement that other international players had gained from such an experience. It was his first stint in county cricket, after a planned season at Lancashire in 2003 was cancelled due to injury. After taking six wickets in his opening two first-class fixtures, he struck form against Hampshire, taking 6/36 and 2/47 in an innings triumph. In his fourth and final first-class match, against Gloucestershire, Harbhajan took a total of 6/193 and equalled his previous first-class best of 84. He ended with 20 wickets at 25.85 and 124 runs at 31.00. In the Twenty20 competition, he had less success in the new format, taking four wickets at 38.00 at an economy rate of 6.60 in eight matches. In all he spent six weeks with the county.

==== Chappell era ====
Harbhajan's first outings under newly appointed coach Greg Chappell came at the Indian Oil Cup in Sri Lanka in August 2005. He took five wickets at 31.40, conceding 4.02 runs per over in four matches, but was wicketless in the final, which was won by the host nation. This was followed by a tour of Zimbabwe, which was marred by tension between the new coach and Indian captain Ganguly. This became public when Ganguly claimed that he was asked to resign as captain. Harbhajan played in all five matches in the Videocon Tri-Series, involving Zimbabwe and New Zealand, with little success, managing only two wickets at 99.00 at an economy rate of 4.77, both of them against an inexperienced Zimbabwe team crippled by a mass exodus of white players from the Mugabe regime. Harbhajan had a quiet Test series against Zimbabwe, taking six wickets at 31.00. He was only required to bowl 58 overs, as the majority of the Zimbabwean batsmen were removed after being unable to cope with Pathan's swing bowling, which was likened to "Frisbees at high speed", leaving little work for the spinners. He managed to claim his 200th Test wicket in the First Test, and in doing so became the second youngest player to reach the mark, after Kapil Dev. Harbhajan's batting was notable for an exceptionally aggressive 18-ball innings in the First Test in Bulawayo, where he hit four fours and three sixes in a cameo innings of 37.

Harbhajan's difficulties were compounded when he earned the ire of cricket authorities by publicly attacking Chappell and defending Ganguly after the team returned to India. He claimed that Chappell had used "double standards" and instilled "fear and insecurity" in the team. The Punjab Cricket Association called him to explain his actions, but he was not punished after offering an apology. In early 2006, Harbhajan changed his stance publicly, praising Chappell for the team's improved form, stating "He has great knowledge about the game and it has been a very successful year for us under him. He has lifted our team to great heights".

Harbhajan was under pressure to perform when Sri Lanka toured India in late 2005, following the replacement of Ganguly, who had frequently supported him during previous career difficulties, with new captain Rahul Dravid. In addition, Harbhajan's home ODI form had been poor in the previous three years, managing only 12 wickets at 56 in 16 matches, with an economy rate of 4.8. In the three Challenger Trophy matches at the start of the season, he took five wickets at 24.20 at an economy rate of 4.25. He responded by claiming 3/35 in the first ODI in Nagpur after Sri Lanka had raced to 50 in just 6.3 overs. The Sri Lankan batsmen hit the Indian fast bowlers out of the attack, scoring 74 runs in the first 10 overs and forcing Dravid to delay the Power Play and introduce Harbhajan. This sparked a Sri Lankan collapse, with 4 wickets taken for 14 runs, resulting in a 152-run Indian victory. Harbhajan took 2/19 in the next match, and aggregated six wickets at 26 in the first four matches, at a low economy rate of 3.43, with a series of performances noted for skilful variations in pace and flight, helping India gain an unassailable 4–0 series lead. He was subsequently rested for the fifth ODI, and ended the series as the most economical bowler, conceding only 3.62 runs per over.

He put on another strong personal performance in the first ODI of the following series against South Africa in Hyderabad, where he struck an aggressive, unbeaten 37 from 17 balls, including two sixes, to help India recover to 249/9, before taking 1/35 from his 10 overs. He was unable to prevent an Indian loss, and was fined after pointing Ashwell Prince to the pavilion after dismissing him. Harbhajan ended the series with five wickets at 27.40, and was again India's most economical bowler, conceding 3.92 runs per over.

The year ended with a three Test series against Sri Lanka. After the first match in Chennai was washed out by monsoonal rains, Harbhajan took match figures of 4/137 as India took a 1–0 series lead in Delhi. He finished the calendar year with a man-of-the-match performance in Ahmedabad, which saw India seal a 2–0 series victory with a 259 run victory. He took 7/62 in the first innings, including six of Sri Lanka's top eight batsmen. He precipitated a middle-order batting collapse, with 6 wickets falling for 82 runs, which allowed India to take a 193-run first innings lead. Harbhajan later contributed an aggressive innings of 40 not-out from 51 balls, in an unbroken 49-run final-wicket partnership with Kumble in the second innings, their display of unorthodox hitting stretching India's lead to 508 runs. His prospects of a half century were cut short by a declaration from acting captain Virender Sehwag, but he was compensated with opening the bowling, as Sehwag employed a novel tactic of assigning the new ball to a spinner. He took 3/79 to finish with match figures of 10/141, ending the year on a high note after he had been embroiled in the leadership struggle only three months earlier.

==== Test decline ====
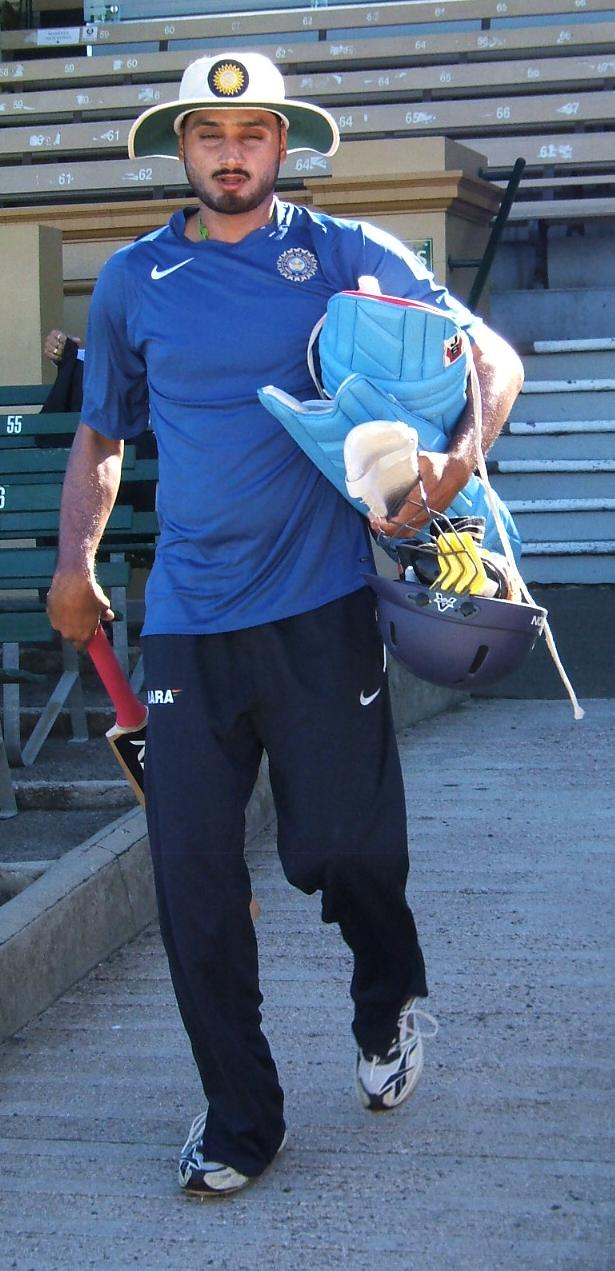
Harbhajan Singh arrives at training.

2006 began with Harbhajan's first tour to arch-rivals Pakistan. The First Test was a high-scoring draw held in Lahore, where Harbhajan recorded his worst ever Test figures of 0/176, conceding more than five runs an over in a match where 1,089 runs were scored for the loss of just eight wickets. In a match in which many batting records fell, Harbhajan was hit for 27 runs in one over by Shahid Afridi, just one short of the world record. The second Test in Faisalabad was another high-scoring draw, with the aggregate runs being the fourth highest in Test history. Harbhajan took 0/101 and 0/78. His 81 overs in the series were the fourth highest number of overs in any Test series without taking a wicket. When he was given the opportunity to make use of the batting surface in India's only innings in Faisalabad, he managed a brisk 38, including two sixes. Harbhajan was dropped for the Third Test in Karachi, where a green pitch promised to favour seam bowling, and Kumble was the only spinner used. After sustaining an injury, Harbhajan was sent home during the subsequent ODI series without playing a match, ending his tour without taking a wicket.

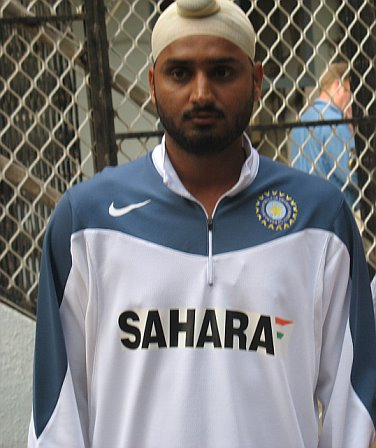
Harbhajan with India in 2006

A return to India for the Test series against England failed to ease Harbhajan's wicket-taking difficulties. He managed match figures of 2/172 in the drawn First Test in Nagpur, and 1/83 in the Second Test in Mohali, where his main contribution was to hit 36 runs, helping India to a first innings lead. Despite taking 3/89 and 2/40 in the Third Test in Mumbai, Harbhajan ended the series with eight wickets with an average of 48.00, nearly twice his career average on Indian soil. Despite his difficulties in Test cricket, Harbhajan's ODI form remained strong, as he top-scored with a rearguard 37 out of 203 and then took 5/31 in a man-of-the-match performance in the first ODI against England in Delhi, sparking a collapse of 7/47 which secured a 39-run victory. He ended the series with 12 wickets at 15.58 with an economy rate of 3.74 from five matches, and topped the wicket-taking list despite being rested for the last match, as well as having the best bowling average and economy rate. India took the series 5–1, Harbhajan taking 3/30 in their only loss.

Harbhajan was unable to maintain his ODI form during the tour to the West Indies, where he managed three wickets at 64 in five matches, although he continued to be economical, conceding 3.91 runs per over. He was omitted from the Test team for the opening two Tests as India opted to use three pace bowlers and Anil Kumble, scrapping the five bowler strategy used since early 2006. The reasons for the return to the four-man attack were unclear, with performance, fatigue, and injury variously offered as explanations. Harbhajan was recalled for the Third Test in St Kitts after the pace attack was unable to dismiss the West Indian batsmen, with local captain Brian Lara stating that his team, who had three wickets in hand at the end of play, would have been lucky to draw the Second Test had Harbhajan been playing. In a drawn match, Harbhajan claimed the leading match figures of 6/186, as well as contributing an unbeaten 38 in the first innings. Harbhajan's 5/13 in 27 balls in the first innings in the Fourth Test saw the hosts lose their last six wickets for 23, to give India a 97-run first innings lead. India went on to secure a victory in a low-scoring match and win the series 1–0, although Harbhajan was punished in the second innings, conceding 65 runs in 16 overs without taking a wicket. It was India's first series victory in the Caribbean in 35 years, with Harbhajan contributing 11 wickets at 24.00.

The 2006–07 season began with the DLF Cup in Malaysia, where Harbhajan made a good start, taking six wickets at 19.16 at an economy rate of 3.59 in four matches. He was man-of-the-match against the West Indies, scoring 37 in a 78-run partnership to push India to 162, before taking 3/35 to secure a 16-run victory. India failed to reach the final, which was contested by Australia and the West Indies. Harbhajan was unable to maintain his form for the 2006 ICC Champions Trophy held in India, managing only two wickets at 51.50 and saving his worst performance of 0/49 in the final group match against Australia on his home ground in Punjab. India won only one of their three matches and were eliminated, although Harbhajan continued to be tidy, conceding 3.67 runs per over. The tour of South Africa in late 2006 saw even less success, with Harbhajan taking only one wicket in three ODI matches while conceding 161 runs at the expensive economy rate of 5.75. He finished the year watching from the sidelines as India fielded Kumble as the only spinner in the three-Test series, which India lost 2–1. Apart from the injury-prone 2003, it was Harbhajan's least productive year in Test cricket since he became a regular team member in 2001, with his managing only 19 wickets at 52.78.

Harbhajan returned for the early 2007 ODI series against the West Indies and Sri Lanka in India, taking seven wickets at 36.00 in seven matches at an economy rate of 4.27. Despite criticism that he was afraid to toss the ball up, and was concentrating on bowling flat in a defensive run-saving style, Harbhajan was selected as the off-spin bowler in the Indian squad for the 2007 Cricket World Cup, while Ramesh Powar, who had been more expensive but had taken more wickets in recent times, was omitted. A statistical study showed that since the start of 2006, Harbhajan has been the second most economical bowler in the final 10 overs of ODIs.

During the 2007 Cricket World Cup, Harbhajan started as India's first-choice spinner and played in their first match against Bangladesh. He took 0/30 from his ten overs, but India lost the match as their batsmen collapsed and Bangladesh had no need to take risks against the bowling. Harbhajan was dropped in favour of Kumble for the second match against Bermuda, which India won easily. Harbhajan was recalled for the final group match against Sri Lanka, and had little effect, taking 0/53 from his ten overs as India were set 255 for victory. Harbhajan made an unbeaten 17 although India collapsed to 185 to lose the match and be eliminated in the group phase. Following the failed campaign, the Indian selectors made multiple changes to the national team, and Harbhajan was dropped for the tours of Bangladesh and England. Rajesh Pawar, Piyush Chawla, and Powar were the spinners selected to partner with Kumble. Harbhajan's waning wicket-taking and his lack of flight were again perceived to be the cause of his problems.

In the meantime, Harbhajan played in two ODIs for the Asian Cricket Council against a combined African team, taking 1/53 and 3/48 as the Asians won both matches. He then returned to Surrey for a second season of county cricket in an attempt to rediscover his form, while his compatriots were touring England, staying throughout July and August. After easing into the season with six wickets in the first two first-class matches, Harbhajan found a rich vein of form, taking 4/64 and 5/64 against Worcestershire, before following up with 5/34 and 6/57 against Kent, and finishing off by scoring 29 to help guide Surrey home by four wickets after they had stumbled in pursuit of 107. He ended the first-class campaign with five and six wickets against Durham and Hampshire, respectively, and totalled 37 wickets at 18.54 in only six outings. He was not so successful in the one-dayers, taking six wickets at 29.50 and an economy rate of 4.65 in five matches.

==== 2007 recall to the team ====
Harbhajan returned to international cricket as part of India's squad for the ICC World Twenty20 tournament in South Africa in September 2007, which India won, having been rank outsiders at the start of the tournament with many senior players opting out of the competition. He played in all six of India's matches and totalled seven wickets at 26.00 and an economy rate of 7.91. In the opening pool match against Pakistan, Harbhajan hit the stumps in a bowl-out after scores were tied; India won 3–0 after three rounds. In the semi-final against Australia, Harbhajan bowled Michael Clarke and conceded only three runs in his final over, the 18th of the match, to turn the match towards India. The final against Pakistan was the only match in which Harbhajan did not bowl his full quota of four overs, after being struck for three sixes in his third over by Misbah-ul-Haq, who led a late charge towards the target. India prevailed by five runs in the final over, Misbah being the last man to fall.

Harbhajan was recalled to the ODI squad during India's home season in 2006–07, which comprised series against Australia and Pakistan. In ten ODIs, he took seven wickets at 61.71, 125, and an economy rate of 4.59, much higher than his career average. He scored 101 runs at 33.66 in these matches, including an unbeaten 38 in one match against Pakistan. He was then recalled to the Test squad, and with India fielding two spinners in its home series against Pakistan, Harbhajan accompanied Kumble in all three Tests. Playing in Tests for the first time in 16 months, he took 10 wickets at 44.10, much higher than his career average in India. His best result was 5/122 in the first innings of the Second Test at Eden Gardens.

He toured Australia and played in three of the four Tests—India persisted with two spinners in all venues except for the Third Test at the pace-friendly WACA Ground. He was at the centre of the controversy in the Second Test, 2007–08 Border–Gavaskar Trophy, being accused of calling Andrew Symonds a monkey. As he was during his previous visits to Australia, Harbhajan was ineffective with the ball. In the First Test in Melbourne, he took match figures of 3/162, before taking 4/200 in the Second Test in Sydney. Upon his recall in Adelaide, he took 1/128 in Australia's only innings on a placid surface, ending the series with eight wickets at 61.25. However, he did manage to take Ponting's wicket for three consecutive innings in the first two Tests, leading to much speculation about the Australian captain's difficulties against the off spinner. After the third dismissal in the Sydney Test, Harbhajan celebrated by running a distance before twice rolling over on the ground. Harbhajan's most noted contribution with the bat came in the Second Test when he came to the crease with India at 345/7, still 118 runs behind Australia, after a middle-order collapse of 4/52. He made 63 runs in a 129-run partnership with Tendulkar, which enabled India to gain a first-innings lead. In the Fourth Test, he came to the crease at 7/359 and scored 63 in a 107-run rearguard partnership with captain Kumble, allowing India to reach 529. He failed to reach double figures in his four other innings and ended with 142 runs at 23.66.

==== Revival ====
Harbhajan returned to international cricket for the tour of Sri Lanka in July and August. In the First Test at Colombo, he took 2/149 as Sri Lanka amassed 600/6 and won by an innings. In the Second Test in Galle, he took 6/102 to help India take a first innings lead of 37 and then took 4/51 in the second innings to help India level the series with a 170-run win. It was his fifth ten-wicket match haul and his first outside India. He was again India's leading wicket-taker in the Third Test defeat, with 3/104 and 1/44. He was India's leading wicket-taker with 16 at 28.12, twice as many the second-most-prolific Indian. In the subsequent ODI series, he played in the first four matches, taking six wickets at 18.83 at an economy rate of 3.80, including 3/40 in the win in the fourth match, which sealed the series. He was rested from the final dead rubber.

At the start of the Indian season, Harbhajan took 2/32 and 4/31 as the Rest of India defeated Delhi in the Irani Trophy. This was followed by the First Test against Australia in Bangalore. Harbhajan took Ponting's wicket in taking 1/103 in the first innings, but not before the Australian captain had scored 123. In reply to Australia's 430, India were in trouble at 195/6 when Harbhajan came in to bat. He scored a rearguard 54, putting on 80 with fellow bowler Zaheer Khan, to reduce India's deficit to 70. He then took 2/76 in the second innings as the match ended in a draw. Ponting later cited Harbhajan's and Zaheer's partnership as the passage of play that prevented an Australian win. In the Second Test, at his home ground in Mohali, Harbhajan took 2/60 in the first innings as India took a 201-run first innings lead. In the second innings Australia were chasing 516 for victory and had started aggressively, reaching 49/0 after seven overs. Harbhajan was introduced into the attack and removed Hayden and Simon Katich in his first over and then Mike Hussey in his next. This triggered Australia's collapse to 58/5 and their eventual defeat by 320 runs. Harbhajan was unable to find a fourth wicket, which would have seen him reach 300 Test wickets on his home ground, and ended with 3/36. He was then ruled out of the drawn Third Test because of a toe injury. Harbhajan returned for the Fourth Test in Nagpur and dismissed Ponting in the first innings for the tenth time in Tests to register his 300th wicket. He ended with 3/94 as India took an 86-run lead. However, a batting collapse meant that India were 6/166 at tea time on day four, only 252 runs ahead and facing possible defeat if Australia could clean up the tail quickly. Harbhajan then scored 52, combining in a 107-run partnership with captain Mahendra Singh Dhoni to guide India out of trouble. India then successfully defended the target of 380 to win by 172 runs, with Harbhajan taking 4/64 including top-scorer Hayden and the final wicket.

Harbhajan was the equal-leading wicket-taker for the series, along with Ishant Sharma, taking 15 wickets at 28.86. He also scored 125 runs at 41.66, helping to prevent two defeats. The series also saw the end of Harbhajan's partnership with Kumble, who missed the Second Test due to injury and then retired after suffering another injury in the next match. As a result, Harbhajan started a new pairing with leg spinner Amit Mishra.

In the five-match home ODI series against England, Harbhajan took seven wickets at 30.29 and an economy rate of 5.04 as India won 5–0. He took one wicket in each of the matches, except the third match in Kanpur. In that match, he took 3/31, registered his 200th ODI wicket and was named man-of-the-match. During the two Tests, Harbhajan was the equal-leading wicket-taker with eight wickets at 35.00, and he also scored 69 runs at 34.50. This included a 40 in the first innings of the First Test to help India reach 241 after a top-order collapse, keeping India's deficit to 75, with India winning the match. Harbhajan ended the year as the third-highest wicket-taker in the world, and the highest among Indian players. He was named by Wisden in their selection of the Test team of the year.

Harbhajan then missed the ODI tour of Sri Lanka at the beginning of the year with a hamstring injury. He recovered in time to be recalled for the tour of New Zealand. Harbhajan was the leading wicket-taker from both teams in both ODIs and Tests. Harbhajan was India's most economical bowler in the two T20 internationals at the start of the tour, taking a total of 2/34 from eight overs and scoring 21 in the first match; the hosts prevailed in both games. In series that saw four of the five ODIs truncated by rain, Harbhajan took five wickets at 29.60 at an economy rate of 5.69. He took 3/27 in the opening match, and then took 2/56 from ten overs in the third game, in which both teams passed 330, helping India to wins in both matches. In the First Test, Harbhajan took 1/57 and 6/63 to help set up a ten-wicket win. It was only the second time that he had taken five wickets in an innings outside the subcontinent. However, he was disappointing in a high-scoring draw in the Second Test, taking 2/120 as the hosts amassed 9/619. In the Third Test, India suffered a middle-order collapse on the first afternoon, and a counter-attacking 60 by Harbhajan helped them to 379. He then took 3/43 and 4/59; New Zealand had only two wickets in hand when rain caused the match to end in a draw with more than a day's playing time lost. Harbhajan ended with 16 wickets at 21.37 and 94 runs at 23.50. India won both series, their first series win in New Zealand since 1981 and 1968 for ODIs and Tests, respectively.

==== 2009 ICC tournaments ====
Harbhajan was part of the Indian team that attempted to defend their crown at the 2009 World Twenty20. However, they lost all three of their matches in the Super 8s round and were eliminated. Harbhajan took 3/30 in one of those matches against England, and ended the tournament with five wickets at 26.20 and an economy rate of 6.55. During the tour of the West Indies that followed, Harbhajan took three wickets at 45.33, conceding almost a run a ball in three ODIs as India prevailed 2–1.

In September, Harbhajan took 5/56 in the final of the Compaq Cup to help secure a 46-run Indian win over the hosts, Sri Lanka. It was his first five-wicket haul in three years and capped off a tournament in which he took six wickets at 22.00 in three matches. He then struggled at the 2009 ICC Champions Trophy in South Africa, taking 1/71 from ten overs against Pakistan and 0/54 from nine overs against Australia. India lost to Pakistan, and the latter match was washed out. He then took 2/14 from eight overs against the West Indies, but it was not enough to prevent India from being eliminated in the first round, despite winning the match.

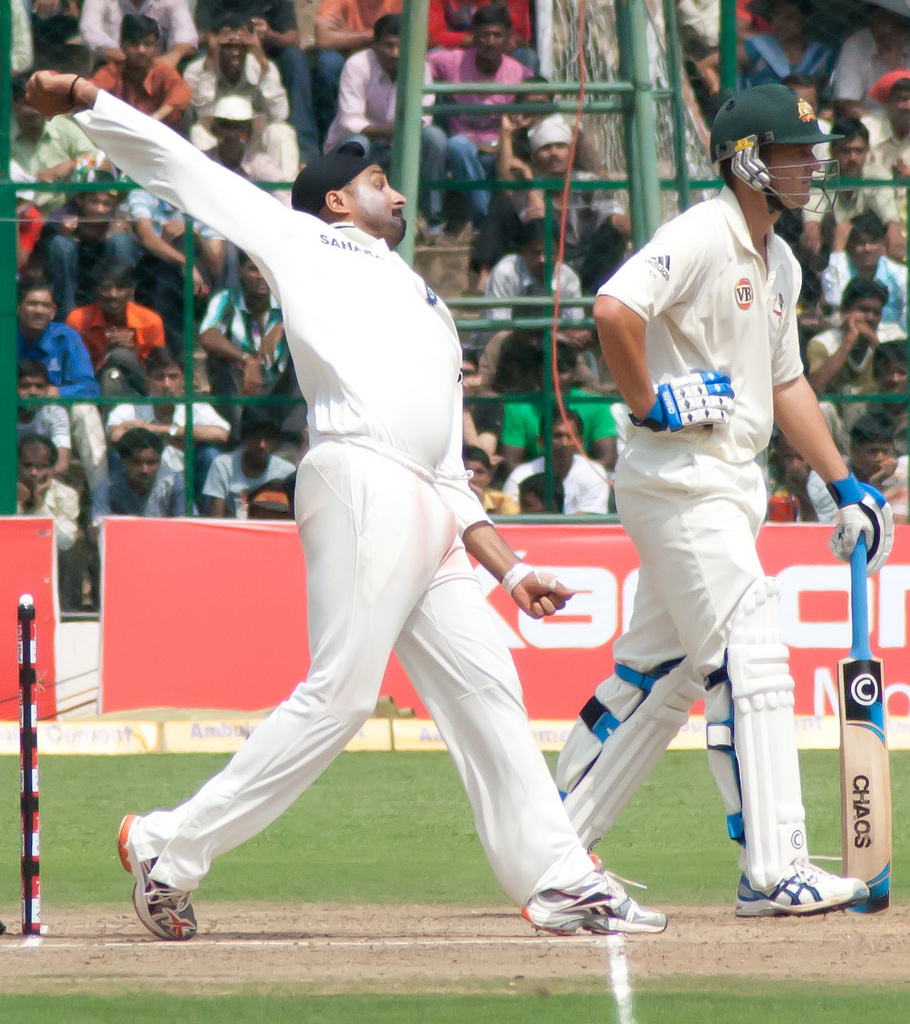
Harbhajan bowling during India's two-match Test series against Australia in October 2010

==== 2010 season ====
After his travails in South Africa, Harbhajan started the Indian season with eight wickets at 12.87 in three Challenger Trophy one-dayers for India Blue. He then played in a home ODI series against Australia, taking eight wickets at 33.87 at an economy rate of 4.51 in six games. This included a best of 2/23 in the sixth match. He made a more influential contribution in the first match with the bat, striking out 49 as India came within striking distance of their target before he fell in the last over and the hosts ended up five runs adrift of the target. He scored a similarly rapid 31 in the fourth match, but India fell 24 runs short. Harbhajan ended the series with 81 runs at 20.25.

In the three home Tests against Sri Lanka, Harbhajan was the highest wicket-taker with 13, but these came at an average cost of 41.00. After taking 2/189 in the drawn First Test, he aggregated 5/152 and 6/192 as India took the next two fixtures by an innings. In the subsequent ODI series, he took six wickets at 35.00 at an economy rate of 4.88 as India won 3–1. He took 2/58 from his ten overs in the first match, which proved to be tidy in the context of a match in which both teams passed 410 and India prevailed by three runs.

During the tri-series in Bangladesh in January 2010, Harbhajan took six wickets at 24.00 in three matches. He missed the First Test due to neck pain but returned to take a total of 2/123 as India completed a clean sweep with a ten-wicket win in the Second Test.

During New Zealand's tour of India in November 2010, Harbhajan scored his maiden Test century during the First Test in Ahmedabad. This was the 100th century by an Indian in the second innings and he reached triple figures with a six. His 115, along with Laxman's 91 saved the game for India after they had collapsed to 5/15. Harbhajan was named man-of-the-match. He followed in the next test with 111* in India's first innings, becoming the first number-8 batsman to score back-to-back test centuries.

After an ordinary performance with the ball in the 5-match ODI series in West Indies in June 2011 (where he was the vice captain to skipper Suresh Raina), taking 4 wickets from 3 matches, best of 3/32, Harbhajan helped his team revive from dire straits in the 1st Test in Sabina Park at Kingston, Jamaica. With India struggling at 85/6, he, along with Suresh Raina, initiated a counter-attack to string an aggressive 146-run partnership with Suresh Raina(82 from 115 balls, 15 fours) to help India reach 246. Harbhajan scored 70 from 74 balls (10 fours, 1 six).

==== 2011 removal from squad ====
Following a few poor performances, Harbhajan was injured in India's tour of England in the summer of 2011 and was ruled out of the rest of the series. Harbhajan was also not selected for the home ODI series against England in October 2011, the Australian tour and the 2012 Asia Cup in Bangladesh. He was, however, included in 30 probables for the World T20 tournament held in Sri Lanka in September 2012. He was recalled to the Test squad, after a gap of more than a year, against New Zealand at the end of August 2012, but didn't play. He was named in the Test squad for the home series against England in November 2012 and played in the second Test, taking two wickets which England won by 10 wickets. He was replaced in the squad by Piyush Chawla ahead of the final Test. Harbhajan regained his Test squad spot from Chawla for the homes series against Australia in February 2013. He played his 100th Test in the first match at M. A. Chidambaram Stadium. He was replaced by Pragyan Ojha after the second Test due to his five wickets taken in the series had cost over 40 runs each.

==== 2015–2016 ====
Following performances in IPL for the Mumbai Indians in 2014 and 2015, he was included in the test team captained by Virat Kohli against Bangladesh for the one-off Test match in Fatullah. He took 3 wickets in that test to overtake Wasim Akram, in the list of most test match wickets, to become the ninth highest wicket-taker in Tests. He was then called up for the ODI and T20I teams when a second-string Indian team toured Zimbabwe to play three One-day and two Twenty-20 matches. Though he did not take many wickets in that tour, he was impressive in maintaining a tight line and stopping the flow of runs.

Harbhajan returned with figures of 2/29 in his first T20 international in over two-and-a-half years. He was on the squad for the 3 test away series against Sri Lanka led by Virat Kohli. He replaced injured Ashwin in a series against South Africa. He was also part of the team that played 3 T20I matches against Australia, home series against Sri Lanka, and the Asia Cup in Bangladesh. He played only one match in the Asia Cup, against UAE. He was also part of the T20 World Cup that took place in India but did not play in any of the matches.

==== 2017 Champions Trophy exclusion ====
Harbhajan was again excluded from the Indian squad for the 2017 Champions Trophy in England. After hearing of his exclusion, Harbhajan claimed he did not receive the same "privileges" that other veteran cricketers, namely MS Dhoni, were afforded by the national selectors. After the media pounced on this comment, Harbhajan claimed the media frenzy was out of proportion to what he had actually said.

==== Post-2017 ====
In 2025, Singh became the official face of crash game Aviator through a brand partnership with Spribe.

== Playing style ==
Harbhajan was an attacking bowler who was well regarded for his ball control and ability to vary the ball's length of travel and pace, although he was often criticised for his flat trajectory. His main wicket-taking ball climbs wickedly on the unsuspecting batsman from a good length away, forcing him to alter his stroke at the last second. With a whippy bowling action, he was reported for throwing in November 1998. Although forced to travel to England for tests, he was cleared by former English player Fred Titmus.

He has developed an ability to bowl a doosra, which was the subject of an official report by match referee Chris Broad, on-field umpires Aleem Dar and Mark Benson, and TV umpire Mahbubur Rahman after the Second Test between India and Bangladesh at Chittagong, Bangladesh in December 2004. The ICC cleared him in May 2005, saying that the straightening of his elbow fell within the permitted limits.

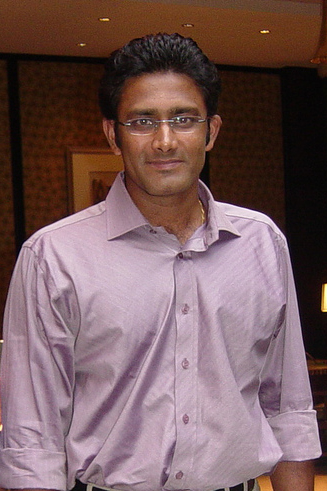
Anil Kumble (pictured), Harbhajan's former Test captain and long-time bowling partner

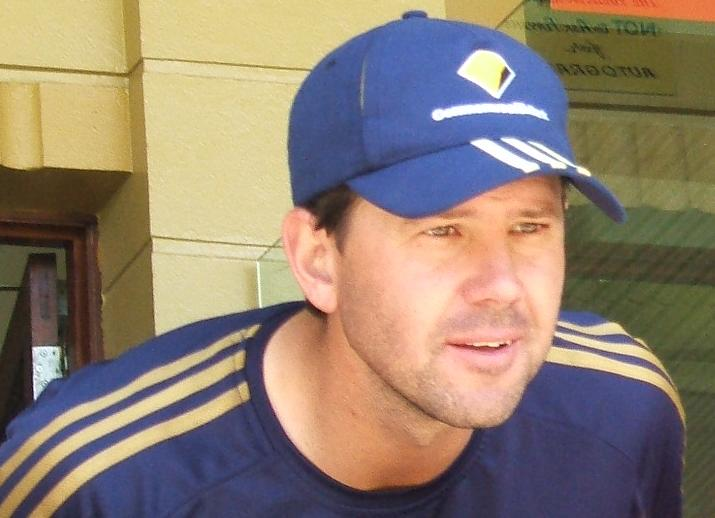
Ricky Ponting (pictured) has been dismissed by Harbhajan ten times in Tests.

Among off spinners, Harbhajan is the third highest wicket-taker in Test history, behind only Muttiah Muralitharan and Ravichandran Ashwin. He is the third-highest Test wicket-taker among all Indians. Harbhajan's average with the ball in home Test matches hovers in the mid-20s. All five of his man-of-the-match awards and both of his man of the series awards, have been obtained in India. Outside India, his bowling average climbs to around 40. Statistically, his bowling in Test matches is most effective against the West Indies and Australia. As of May 2008, his most productive hunting grounds have been Eden Gardens in Calcutta, where he has taken 38 wickets at 23.10 in six Tests, while the Chepauk in Chennai, where he has claimed two man-of-the-match awards, has yield 34 wickets at 24.25 in five Tests. Harbhajan has claimed his wickets most cheaply at Wankhede Stadium in Mumbai, where he has taken 22 wickets at 19.45. Compared to Muralitharan, Harbhajan is less reliant on targeting the stumps for his dismissals; he captures more than 60% of his wickets via catches and less than 25% by bowling or trapping batsmen with leg before wicket, whereas the corresponding figures for Muralitharan are in the 40s. Harbhajan's off-spin complements Kumble's leg spin. While Harbhajan is known for his emotional and extroverted celebrations, which are part of a deliberate strategy of aggression, Kumble is known for his undemonstrative and composed approach. Both spinners have opined that they bowl more effectively in tandem via persistent application of pressure on batsmen, but statistics have shown that while Kumble has performed better when paired with Harbhajan, Harbhajan has been more effective in Kumble's absence.

Harbhajan has been particularly successful against Australian batsman Ricky Ponting, taking his wicket on ten occasions in Test cricket.

In an interview in 2001, Harbhajan stated his ambition to become an all-rounder. Although he had recorded a few half-centuries at Test level, his batting average hovered around 15 in both Tests and ODIs. However, in the span of four years, starting from 2003, he has shown improved performance, averaging around 20 with the bat. His style is frequently described as unorthodox, with pundits agreeing with his self-assessment of attributing his batting achievements to his hand-eye coordination, rather than his footwork or technique. The aggression in Harbhajan's bowling also extends to his batting, with a Test strike rate in the 60s, placing his among the ten highest strike rates among players who have scored more than 1000 runs in Test cricket.

== Political career ==
In March 2022, Singh was nominated to the Rajya Sabha by the Aam Aadmi Party as one of their five candidates from the state of Punjab. He won unopposed and was officially elected as Member of Parliament, Rajya Sabha. On 18 July 2022, Harbhajan took oath as a member of the Rajya Sabha from Punjab on the first day of the Monsoon session of Parliament.

On 24 April 2026, he joined the Bharatiya Janata Party along with 6 other Rajya Sabha MPs including Raghav Chadha and Swati Maliwal.

Immediately thereafter, Punjab Police withdrew the Z Plus security given to Singh. Simultaneously AAP workers held protests outside his residence, writing 'Gaddar' (traitor) on the boundary walls of his house in Punjab. Singh went to Punjab and Haryana High Court challenging the withdrawal of his security cover, to which it issued notice to the Punjab government directing it to ensure no physical harm comes to Singh. Thereafter, Singh alleged selling of Punjab Rajya Sabha seats by AAP. While the Opposition Congress demanded Probe into these allegations, AAP called them baseless, saying that he was parroting BJP script.

== Filmography ==
=== Films ===
Year	Film	Role	Language	Notes
2004	Mujhse Shaadi Karogi	Himself	Hindi	Special appearance
2009	Victory	Himself	Hindi	Special appearance
2013	Bhaji in Problem	Harbhajan	Punjabi	Special appearance
2015	Second Hand Husband	Police Officer	Hindi	Special appearance
2021	Dikkiloona	Sardesh Singh	Tamil	Special appearance
2021	Friendship	Bhagat Singh	Tamil	Lead role

=== Television ===
Year	Title	Role	Language	Notes	Ref(s)
2008	Ek Khiladi Ek Haseena	Contestant	Hindi	Winner	
2012	Ring Ka King	Himself	Hindi		
2016	Mazaak Mazaak Mein	Judge	Hindi		
2016	Yaaron Ki Baraat	Himself	Hindi		
2017	MTV Roadies Rising	Himself	Hindi		
2021–2022	Punjabiyan Di Dadagiri With Bhajji	Host/presenter	Punjabi		

== Personal life ==
One of his common nicknames, outside India, is The Turbanator, deriving from his skill as a bowler in terminating the innings of the opposing team, and the fact that, as a Sikh, he always wore a patka whenever he played. He later replaced the traditional patka with a head covering resembling a bandana when playing. Among Indians, Harbhajan is more commonly known as Bhajji. It was estimated in 2005 that Harbhajan was the most recognised and commercially viable Indian cricketer after Sachin Tendulkar, due to his colourful personality and iconic turban, and as well as his reputation for enjoying the celebrity social scene. His signing for English county team Surrey in 2005, based at The Oval in London, was partly attributed to his marketability. Harbhajan had generated a large personal following in the western London suburb of Southall, which boasts a majority Punjabi Sikh population, when he lived there in 1998 while training under Fred Titmus.

Following his performance against Australia in 2001, the Government of Punjab awarded him ₹5 lakh (US$5,300), a plot of land, and an offer to become a Deputy Superintendent of Police in Punjab, which he did not accept until later.

Despite having a job offer with the constabulary, Harbhajan sustained minor injuries in March 2002 in an altercation with police outside the team hotel in Guwahati. The scuffle broke out when Harbhajan remonstrated with officers after they refused to allow a photographer into the hotel. Harbhajan's bowling arm was cut and his elbow injured when he was struck by the police. Extensive negotiations involving local officials and organisers were required to dissuade Harbhajan and captain Sourav Ganguly from leaving the area after Ganguly said that the Indian team would abandon the scheduled match against Zimbabwe.

Harbhajan was detained at Auckland airport for failing to declare that he had filthy boots in his luggage. His only excuse was that he "couldn't be bothered" complying with New Zealand quarantine laws. He was fined $200.

Following the death of his father, Harbhajan became the family head and arranged marriages for three of his sisters. In 2005, he fended off marriage rumours linking him to a Bangalore-based bride, stating that he would only make a decision "after a couple of years", and that he would be seeking a Punjabi bride selected by his family.

Harbhajan married his longtime girlfriend, actress Geeta Basra, on 29 October 2015 in Jalandhar. They have a daughter, born on 27 July 2016, and a son, born on 10 July 2021.

=== 1998 suspension ===
Harbhajan was fined and suspended for one ODI by the match referee in his first international series, when his on-field behaviour was adjudged to violate the ICC Code of Conduct. The incident in question was his altercation with Ricky Ponting after dismissing him.

=== Royal Stag whisky ===
In 2006, Harbhajan's endorsements generated controversy when he appeared without his turban in an advertisement for Royal Stag whisky. This angered many orthodox Sikhs, leading to anti-Harbhajan protests in the Sikh holy city of Amritsar, with effigies of Harbhajan being burnt. The Sikh clergy and Shiromani Gurdwara Prabandhak Committee demanded an apology from him and asked Seagram's to withdraw the advert, on the basis that it had "hurt the feelings of Sikhs". Harbhajan quickly issued an apology, but he was also unhappy at the clergy's interference, stating "If they were unhappy, they should have called me and talked to me like a son". Harbhajan was also a brand ambassador for eBikeGo.

=== Altercations with Andrew Symonds and Sreesanth ===
While Harbhajan was batting during his 63 on the third day of the Second Test at the Sydney Cricket Ground, he became involved in an altercation with Australia's Andrew Symonds. As a result of this, he was charged with the Level-3 offence of racially abusing Symonds by calling the Australian—of Afro-Caribbean descent—a "monkey". Harbhajan and Tendulkar, his batting partner at the time of the incident, denied this. At a hearing after the conclusion of the Test, match referee Mike Procter found Harbhajan guilty and banned him for three Tests. This decision generated controversy because no audio or video evidence was available, and the conviction relied on the testimony of the Australian players. The Indian team initially threatened to withdraw from the series pending an appeal against Harbhajan's suspension, however BCCI president Sharad Pawar later claimed that the tour would proceed even if the second hearing was unsuccessful.

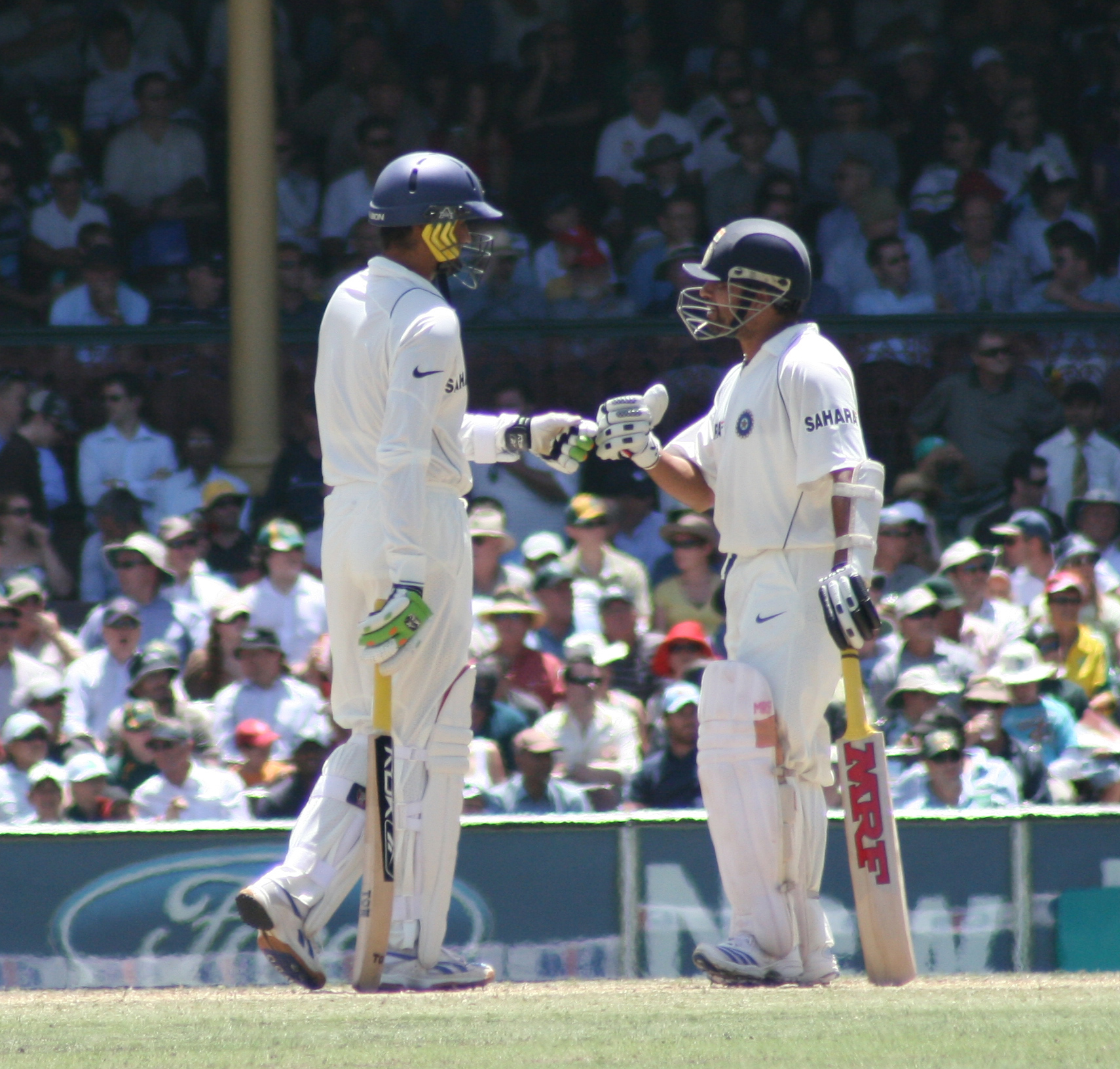
Harbhajan (left), batting with Tendulkar during the Second Test at the SCG. The altercation with Symonds occurred during their partnership.

On 29 January, following the Fourth Test, the appeal hearing was conducted in Adelaide by ICC Appeals Commissioner Justice John Hansen. The result was that the racism charge was not proved, resulting in the revocation of the three-Test ban imposed by Procter. However, Harbhajan was found guilty of using abusive language and fined 50% of his match fee. Hansen later admitted he "could have imposed a more serious penalty if he was made aware by the ICC of the bowler's previous transgressions"—including a suspended one-Test ban. It was reported that senior players from both teams had written a letter to Hansen requesting that the charge be downgraded. According to this report, the letter was signed by Tendulkar and Ponting and counter-signed by Michael Clarke, Hayden, and Symonds himself.

In the aftermath of the hearing, Hayden called Harbhajan an "obnoxious weed" during a radio interview, which earned him a code-of-conduct violation charge from Cricket Australia.

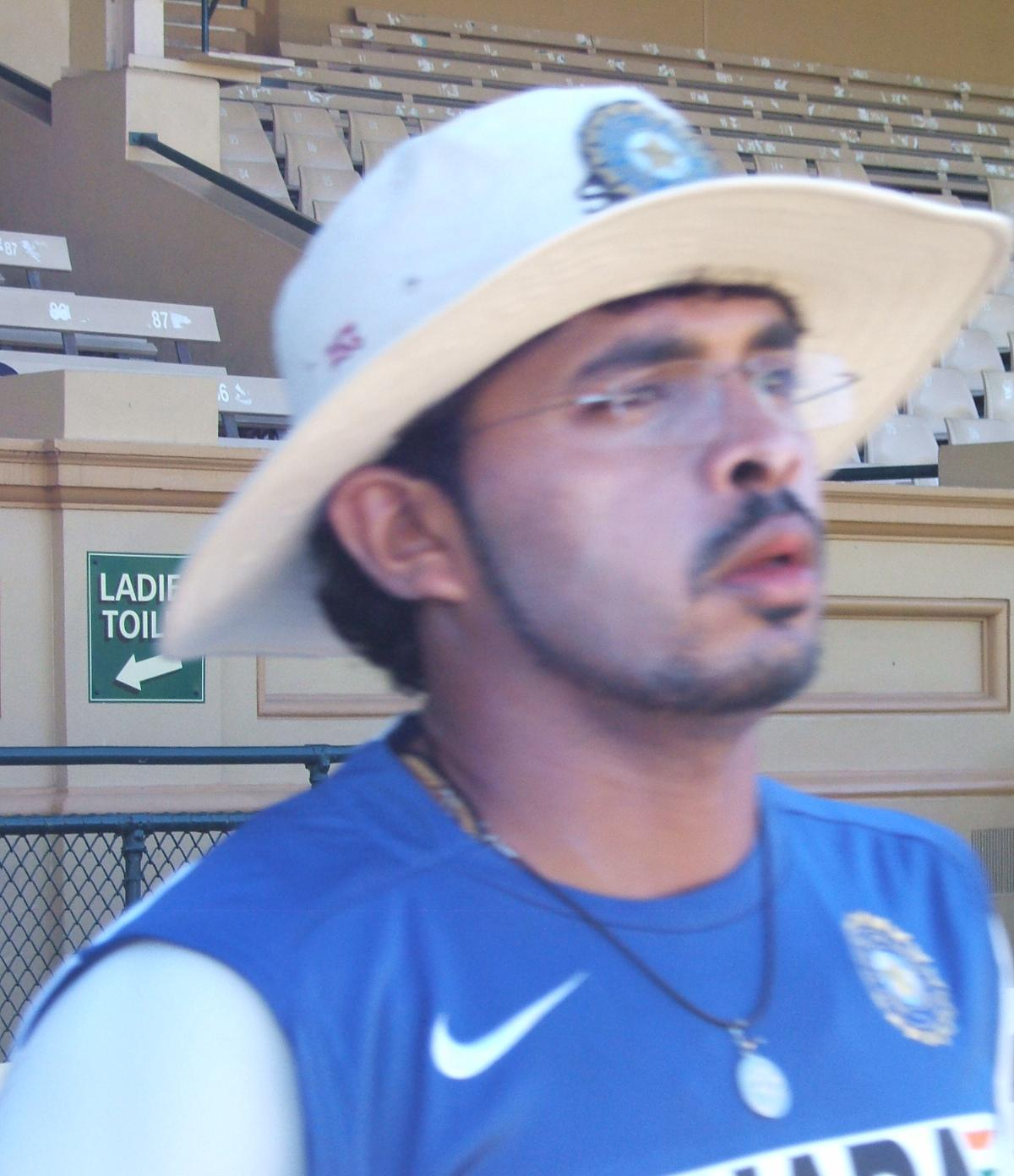
Sreesanth (pictured), who was slapped by Harbhajan

Harbhajan was involved in further controversy after a 2008 Indian Premier League (IPL) match between the Mumbai Indians and Kings XI Punjab at Mohali in April 2008. While the teams were shaking hands, he slapped Kerala paceman and Indian teammate Sreesanth in the face. Harbhajan, who had stood in as the Mumbai captain for the first three matches of the tournament to that point, all of which were lost, had apparently been angered by Sreesanth's aggressive sending-off of his batsmen as Punjab coasted to a decisive victory. Kings XI Punjab lodged an official complaint with the IPL. The match referee Farokh Engineer found Harbhajan guilty of a level 4.2 offence, banning him from the remainder of the IPL and preventing him from claiming his entire season's salary. Harbhajan made up with Sreesanth, and said that "I have been punished for the wrong I did". Harbhajan had taken five wickets at 16.40 at an economy rate of 8.20 and scored 30 runs at 15.00 in the three matches before his ban. On 14 May, the BCCI disciplinary committee found Harbhajan guilty under Rule 3.2.1 of their regulations and handed down the maximum punishment of a five-match ban from ODIs. Harbhajan faces the prospect of a life ban if he commits significant disciplinary breaches in the future. As a result, Harbhajan missed the tri-series in Bangladesh and the 2008 Asia Cup in Pakistan, and India went down in the final of both tournaments after qualifying first on both occasions. He would have been eligible for selection after the first two matches of the Asia Cup, but the selectors omitted him entirely.

In 2021, he tendered an unconditional apology for sharing a social media post that had a picture of Khalistani militant Jarnail Singh Bhindranwale to pay homage to those who died in Operation Blue Star of 1984. Facing backlash from all quarters, Harbhajan said he posted a WhatsApp forward on the 37th anniversary of the operation without realizing that the man in the picture was Bhindranwale.

=== Twitter altercation with Mohammad Amir ===
On 27 October 2021, Harbhajan was involved in altercation with Pakistani cricketer Mohammad Amir on Twitter following India's loss to Pakistan in the 2021 ICC Men's T20 World Cup.

Rajya Sabha
Preceded by List	Member of Parliament in Rajya Sabha for Punjab; 2022 –	Incumbent
