= Tendulkar (surname) =

Tendulkar (Marathi: तेंडुलकर) is a surname found among RSB of Maharashtra, India.

== Notable people ==
People with tendulkar as surname:

- Sachin Tendulkar, former Indian cricketer
- Dinanath Gopal Tendulkar, an Indian writer
- Priya Vijay Tendulkar, an Indian actress
- Suresh Tendulkar, an Indian economist
- Vijay Tendulkar, an Indian playwright
- Arjun Tendulkar, Mumbai cricketer
- Ramesh Tendulkar, Author
