= Boria Majumdar =

Indian sports journalist and author (born 1976)

- Born: March 8, 1976 (age 50); West Bengal, India
- Occupations: Journalist and sports Historian
- Known for: cricket analysis, writing sports related books, YouTube channel
- Notable work: • Twenty Two Yards to Freedom • Playing it my way - Co Author Sachin Tendulkar 's autobiography
- Website: www.boriamajumdar.com

Boria Majumdar is an Indian sports journalist, sports historian and writer. He was the co-writer of Sachin Tendulkar's autobiography Playing it My Way. He was banned for 2 years by the Board of Control for Cricket in India for threatening Indian cricketer Wriddhiman Saha. He has now come out with his version of the events in his new book after the ban was lifted in 2024. The book subsequently became a bestseller and is much used in understanding how social media operates in this day and age. He has since covered multiple cricket events and has built Revsportz to now include 50 journalists working for the organisation.

== Early life ==
Majumdar was born on 8 March 1976 at Kolkata. He completed his schooling from The Frank Anthony Public School, Kolkata. He completed his B.A. in history from Presidency College, University of Calcutta in the year 1997. In 1999, he did his M.A. in Modern History from the same university. He was awarded the Rhodes scholar in 1999–2000 and went to St John's College, University of Oxford to do a DPhil on the Social History of Indian Cricket in October 2000. He completed his doctorate in March 2004 and the thesis was subsequently nominated for publication in the Oxford monographs series. It was published in India by Penguin-Viking as the much acclaimed Twenty-Two Yards to Freedom: A Social History of Indian Cricket in December 2004.

== Personal life ==
Majumdar is married to Sharmistha Gooptu.

Majumdar launched RevSportz with backing from multiple corporates.

== Sports journalism ==
He co-wrote Playing It My Way, the autobiography of former Indian cricketer Sachin Tendulkar. He have connections with high-profile former cricketers such as Sachin Tendulkar and others. He writes columns-articles for various newspapers and websites. He worked as an editor of Times of India and covered 2020 summer Olympics for them.

In 2018 his second book, Eleven Gods and a Billion Indians: The On and Off the Field Story of Cricket in India and Beyond, was published by Simon & Schuster.

In 2019 he was a senior research fellow in the School of Sport and Wellbeing at the University of Central Lancashire. Previously he has worked as distinguished visiting fellow at La Trobe University, Melbourne and, since 2003, as visiting lecturer at the University of Chicago.

== Controversies ==
The BCCI imposed a two-year ban on Majumdar after a three-member committee found him guilty of intimidating India wicket-keeper Wriddhiman Saha over an interview request in 2022. BCCI committee after investigation found out that Boria Majumder threatened Saha by WhatsApp messages, when the latter was not willing to give him an interview. After receiving the messages, Saha posted the screenshots of these messages on his twitter handle without revealing Majumdar's name. From March 2022 BCCI banned him for 2 years, amid this ban he is not allowed to take interview of any registered cricketer of the board, the board blocked him from entering in stadium-grounds amid domestic or international cricket matches, he is not allowed to use any BCCI or state cricket board's facilities. Majumdar will not receive any journalist accreditation during any cricket matches. Majumdar accused Saha, that he doctored his WhatsApp messages, and said that he will file defamation case against him. According to BCCI, this decision was given after hearing both parties by a committee at New Delhi. BCCI in their press release said that this decision will set a precedent for the future, so no journalist will dare to threaten a cricketer to do something or force to give an interview.

== Bibliography ==
- Once Upon a Furore: Lost Pages of Indian Cricket (2004).
- Playing It My Way (2014) Ghostwritten for S. Tendulkar.
- Eleven Gods and a Billion Indians: The On and Off the Field Story of Cricket in India and Beyond (2018).
- A History of Indian Sport Through 100 Artefacts (2017).
- Banned: A Social Media Trial (2024).
