= Playing It My Way =

2014 autobiography by Sachin Tendulkar and Boria Majumdar

- Author: Sachin Tendulkar; Boria Majumdar
- Language: English
- Subject: Autobiography
- Genre: Autobiography
- Publisher: Hodder & Stoughton (worldwide); Hachette India (In the subcontinent)
- Publication date: 5 November 2014
- Publication place: India
- Media type: Print (Hardcover)
- Pages: 486
- ISBN: 978-1-4736-0520-6

Playing It My Way is the autobiography of former Indian cricketer Sachin Tendulkar. It was launched on 5 November 2014 in Mumbai. The book summarises Tendulkar's early days, his 24 years of international career and aspects of his life that have not been shared publicly. It entered the Limca Book of Records for being the best selling adult hardback across both fiction and non-fiction categories. In India, it broke the record set by Walter Isaacson's biography of Steve Jobs for being the most pre-ordered biographical book, amassing the record by 20,000 orders.

== Accuracy ==
In the book, Tendulkar mentioned that just months before the 2007 Cricket World Cup, Greg Chappell, who was at this time the coach of the Indian cricket team, visited Tendulkar at his home and suggested that he should take over the captaincy from Rahul Dravid, then the team captain. Chappell however denied this, stating that he never contemplated Tendulkar replacing Dravid as captain. The book has also been criticised for many factual errors, particularly with the scorecards.

== Release ==
Playing It My Way was released on 6 November 2014. It was entered in the Limca Book of Records for 2016. It was co-written by Sachin Tendulkar himself, and Boria Majumdar.
