= The Big Appeal =

2020 Australian cricket fundraiser

The Big Appeal (Cricket's Day of Giving) was a set of three cricketing events on 8 and 9 February 2020 aimed at raising relief for those affected by the 2019–20 Australian bushfire season. The three events included the ‘Bushfire Cricket Bash’, the Commonwealth Bank Women's Tri-Series T20I match between India and Australia and the final of the Big Bash League (BBL). All profits and funds went to the Australian Red Cross Disaster Relief and Recovery Fund. The Bushfire Cricket Bash raised $7.7 million.

== Bushfire relief match ==
The Bushfire Cricket Bash was a T10 format match which took place on 9 February 2020. It featured former leading cricketers from around the world. Some former male cricketing stars that took part were Adam Gilchrist, Andrew Symonds, Brad Haddin, Matthew Hayden, Wasim Akram and Yuvraj Singh; female stars included Elyse Villani, Alex Blackwell and Phoebe Litchfield. Sportsmen from other codes who participated included Cameron Smith, Luke Hodge and Nick Riewoldt. Sachin Tendulkar and Tim Paine appeared as coaches. Adam Gilchrist and Ricky Ponting were the captains.

During the innings break, Ellyse Perry and recent debutant, Annabel Sutherland, bowled to Sachin Tendulkar, in his first time batting in almost 6 years.

Ponting XI won the one-off match by 1 run. The match raised $7.7 million for relief efforts.

=== Team Lists ===
S/N	Name	Nat.	Date of birth (age)	S/N	Name	Nat.	Date of birth (age)
Ponting XI				Gilchrist XI			
	Ricky Ponting (c)	(Australia)	19 December 1974 (age 45)		Adam Gilchrist (c & wk)	(Australia)	14 November 1971 (age 48)
	Justin Langer	(Australia)	21 November 1970 (age 49)		Shane Watson	(Australia)	17 June 1981 (age 38)
	Matthew Hayden	(Australia)	29 October 1971 (age 48)		Brad Hodge	(Australia)	29 December 1974 (age 45)
	Alex Blackwell	(Australia)	31 August 1983 (age 36)		Yuvraj Singh	(India)	12 December 1981 (age 38)
	Brian Lara	(Cricket West Indies)	2 May 1969 (age 50)		Elyse Villani	(Australia)	6 October 1989 (age 30)
	Phoebe Litchfield	(Australia)	18 April 2003 (age 16)		Andrew Symonds	(Australia)	9 June 1975 (age 44)
	Brad Haddin (wk)	(Australia)	23 October 1977 (age 42)		Courtney Walsh	(Cricket West Indies)	30 October 1962 (age 57)
	Brett Lee	(Australia)	8 November 1976 (age 43)		Nick Riewoldt	(Australia)	17 October 1982 (age 37)
	Wasim Akram	(Pakistan)	3 June 1966 (age 53)		Peter Siddle	(Australia)	25 November 1984 (age 35)
	Dan Christian	(Australia)	4 May 1983 (age 36)		Fawad Ahmed	(Australia)	5 February 1982 (age 37)
	Luke Hodge	(Australia)	15 June 1984 (age 35)		Cameron Smith	(Australia)	18 June 1983 (age 36)
	Sachin Tendulkar (coach)	(India)	24 April 1973 (age 46)		Tim Paine (Coach)	(Australia)	8 December 1984 (age 35)

=== Game Results ===
9 February 2020
15:15
Scorecard

Ponting XI; 5/104 (10 overs)	v	Gilchrist XI; 5/103 (10 overs)
Brian Lara 30 (11); Yuvraj Singh 1/10 (1 over)		Shane Watson 30 (9); Brett Lee 2/11 (2 overs)

Ponting XI won by 1 run
Junction Oval, Melbourne
Umpires: Mel Jones (Aus), Nathan Lyon (Aus)

- Gilchrist XI won the toss and elected to field.
- 12 players per side (11 batting and 11 fielding).
- For highlights, see here.
