= 1997–98 Coca-Cola Cup =

International cricket tournament

1998 Coca-Cola Cup
- Part of Australian cricket team in India in 1997–98
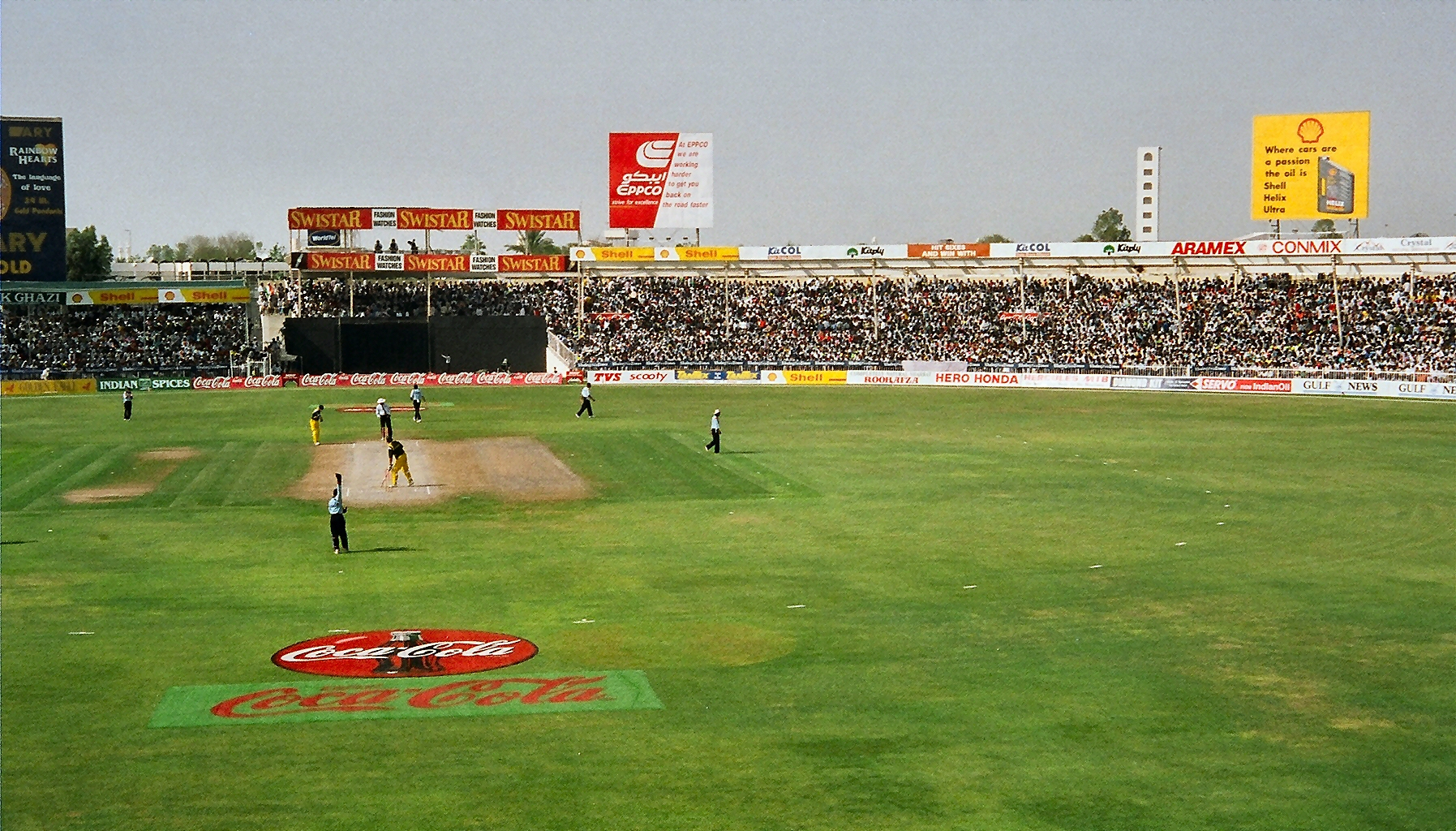
- India v/s Australia match in progress during the Coca-Cola Cup
- Date: 17 – 24 April 1998
- Location: Sharjah
- Result: Won by India
- Player of the series: Sachin Tendulkar (Ind)
Teams
India	Australia	New Zealand
Captains
Mohammad Azharuddin	Steve Waugh	Stephen Fleming
Most runs
Sachin Tendulkar (434) Sourav Ganguly (184)	Michael Bevan (276); Adam Gilchrist (149)	Stephen Fleming (187); Craig McMillan (152)
Most wickets
Prasad (9) Anil Kumble (8)	Damien Fleming (10); Steve Waugh (5)	Dion Nash (6); Chris Cairns (4)

The Coca-Cola Cup was a tri-nation cricket tournament played in Sharjah in 1998. This was the first cricket tournament in Sharjah to be sponsored by Coca-Cola and was played under the aegis of the Cricketers Benefit Fund Series. The Round Robin format was followed with each team playing the other two teams twice each. All matches were day and night games and the tournament featured India, Australia and New Zealand cricket teams. This tournament was the first one in ten years which was held in Sharjah that Pakistan was not a part of. 24,000 spectators witnessed the final, a record turnout for a match at Sharjah Cricket Association Stadium, where all the matches were played.

India won the tournament after losing all their league games against Australia in a reversal of what happened during the Pepsi Cup (sponsored by Coke's competitor Pepsi) in India just preceding this tournament, where Australia lost all their league ties to India but beat India in the finals to claim the title.

Australia won all their league matches and qualified for the final, while both India and New Zealand had won a game each, which meant that the second finalist was chosen based on a better net run rate.

Winners India took home US$40,000 in prize money, while Australia got US$30,000 for being runners up and third place New Zealand got US$15,000. Sachin Tendulkar won the man of the tournament award and an Opel Astra that went with the award, apart from winning other awards for most sixes and fastest fifty. Damien Fleming and Ricky Ponting of Australia won the best bowler and best fielder awards respectively.

== Group stage ==
Team	P	W	L	T	NR	Pts	NRR
Australia	4	4	0	0	0	8	+0.788
India	4	1	3	0	0	2	−0.331
New Zealand	4	1	3	0	0	2	−0.401

=== Matches ===
17 April (D/N)
Scorecard

India; 9/220 (50 overs)	v	New Zealand; 205 (47.5 overs)
Sourav Ganguly 105 (140); Dion Nash 4/38 (10 overs)		Stephen Fleming 75 (97); Ajit Agarkar 4/35 (10 overs)

India won by 15 runs
Sharjah Cricket Association Stadium, Sharjah
Umpires: Steve Bucknor (WI) and Javed Akhtar (Pak)
Player of the match: Ajit Agarkar (Ind)

- India won the toss and elected to bat.
- Harbhajan Singh (Ind) made his ODI debut.

18 April (D/N)
Scorecard

New Zealand; 159 (48.4 overs)	v	Australia; 4/160 (36.5 overs)
Stephen Fleming 59 (94); Damien Fleming 4/28 (9.4 overs)		Adam Gilchrist 57 (89); Chris Harris 2/31 (10 overs)

Australia won by 6 wickets
Sharjah Cricket Association Stadium, Sharjah
Umpires: Javed Akhtar (Pak) and Ian Robinson (Zim)
Player of the match: Damien Fleming (Aus)

- New Zealand won the toss and elected to bat.

19 April (D/N)
Scorecard

Australia; 9/264 (50 overs)	v	India; 206 (44 overs)
Michael Bevan 58 (83); Harbhajan Singh 3/41 (10 overs)		Sachin Tendulkar 80(72); Steve Waugh 4/40 (9 overs)

Australia won by 58 runs
Sharjah Cricket Association Stadium, Sharjah
Umpires: Steve Bucknor (WI) and Ian Robinson (Zim)
Player of the match: Sachin Tendulkar (Ind)

- Australia won the toss and elected to bat.

20 April (D/N)
Scorecard

India; 181 (49.3 overs)	v	New Zealand; 6/183 (49 overs)
Sachin Tendulkar 38 (58); Chris Cairns 3/26 (10 overs)		Craig McMillan 59 (122); Anil Kumble 2/26 (10 overs)

New Zealand won by 4 wickets
Sharjah Cricket Association Stadium, Sharjah
Umpires: Steve Bucknor (WI) and Javed Akhtar (Pak)
Player of the match: Craig McMillan (NZ)

- India won the toss and elected to bat.
- Paul Wiseman (NZ) made his ODI debut.

21 April (D/N)
Scorecard

New Zealand; 5/259 (50 overs)	v	Australia; 5/261 (47.5 overs)
Nathan Astle 78 (125); Ian Harvey 2/59 (10 overs)		Tom Moody 63 (74); Dion Nash 2/39 (9 overs)

Australia won by 5 wickets
Sharjah Cricket Association Stadium, Sharjah
Umpires: Javed Akhtar (Pak) and Ian Robinson (Zim)
Player of the match: Tom Moody (Aus)

- New Zealand won the toss and elected to bat.

22 April (D/N)
Scorecard

Australia; 7/284 (50 overs)	v	India; 5/250 (46 overs)
Michael Bevan 101* (103); Venkatesh Prasad 2/41 (8 overs)		Sachin Tendulkar 143 (131); Damien Fleming 2/46 (10 overs)

Australia won by 26 runs (D/L)
Sharjah Cricket Association Stadium, Sharjah
Umpires: Steve Bucknor (WI) and Ian Robinson (Zim)
Player of the match: Sachin Tendulkar (Ind)

- Australia won the toss and elected to bat.
- Sandstorm disrupted the play by about 25 minutes. Indian target was revised to 276 in 46 overs after the break.
- India required 254 to pass New Zealand on net run rate, and qualify for the final. After the break it was 237 in 46 overs.

== Final ==
24 April (D/N)
Scorecard

Australia; 9/272 (50 overs)	v	India; 4/275 (48.3 overs)
Darren Lehmann 70 (59); Venkatesh Prasad 2/32 (10 overs)		Sachin Tendulkar 134 (131); Damien Fleming 2/47 (10 overs)

India won by 6 wickets
Sharjah Cricket Association Stadium, Sharjah
Umpires: Steve Bucknor (WI) and Javed Akhtar (Pak)
Player of the match: Sachin Tendulkar (Ind)

- India won the toss and elected to field
- India won the 1997/98 Coca-Cola Cup

== Statistics ==
=== Most runs ===
Player	Team	Runs	Inns	Avg	S/R	HS	100s	50s
Sachin Tendulkar	India	435	5	87.00	100.46	143	2	1
Michael Bevan	Australia	276	5	55.20	82.63	101*	1	2
Stephen Fleming	New Zealand	187	4	46.75	71.92	75	0	2
Sourav Ganguly	India	184	5	36.80	70.22	103	1	0
Craig McMillan	New Zealand	152	4	38.00	59.84	59	0	1

=== Most wickets ===
Player	Team	Wkts	Mts	Ave	S/R	Econ	BBI
Damien Fleming	Australia	10	4	15.60	22.6	4.14	4/28
Venkatesh Prasad	India	9	5	21.77	29.3	4.45	2/32
Anil Kumble	India	8	5	26.12	37.3	4.19	3/39
Dion Nash	New Zealand	6	3	15.33	23.0	4.0	4/38
Ajit Agarkar	India	6	2	16.0	18.0	5.33	4/35

== Desert Storm ==
The tournament is best known for Sachin Tendulkar's back to back centuries against Australia (popularly known as 'Desert Storm') - the first helped India qualify for the final based on a better net run rate, and the second, in the finals which was played on Tendulkar's 25th birthday, helped India beat Australia to win the tournament. In lighter vein, Australian bowler Shane Warne claimed that he had "nightmares" at the thought of bowling to Tendulkar after being dominated by him in the tournament. Tendulkar is credited for single-handedly winning the tournament for India. The last league match, where India played Australia needing to finish with a win or a better net run rate than New Zealand to qualify for the finals, was interrupted by a sandstorm. Tendulkar's hundred following the storm in that match, which ensured that India qualified for the finals, came to be known as the "sandstorm innings" or "Desert Storm".

The other Indian player who made a notable contribution in the tournament victory was Sourav Ganguly, whose century against New Zealand resulted in the only Indian victory in the league stage. For Australia, Michael Bevan made a century in the last league game versus India, which resulted in an Australian victory but couldn't stop India from qualifying for the finals.

== Notes ==
- Records for most wickets in the tournament
- Records for most runs in the tournament
