= Arjun Tendulkar =

Indian cricketer (born 1999)

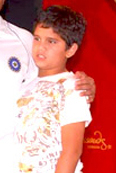

Personal information
- Born: 24 September 1999 (age 27); Mumbai, Maharashtra, India
- Height: 6 ft 1 in (185 cm)
- Batting: Left-handed
- Bowling: Left-arm medium-fast
- Role: Bowler
- Relatives: Sachin Tendulkar (father); Ramesh Tendulkar (grandfather)

Domestic team information
- Years: Team
- 2020/21: Mumbai
- 2021–2025: Mumbai Indians
- 2022/23–: Goa
- 2026–: Lucknow Super Giants

Career statistics
| Competition | FC | LA | T20 |
|---|---|---|---|
| Matches | 24 | 24 | 29 |
| Runs scored | 685 | 160 | 189 |
| Batting average | 20.75 | 14.54 | 13.50 |
| 100s/50s | 1/2 | 0/0 | 0/0 |
| Top score | 120 | 26 | 47 |
| Balls bowled | 3,365 | 1,146 | 562 |
| Wickets | 52 | 26 | 35 |
| Bowling average | 38.03 | 42.65 | 22.97 |
| 5 wickets in innings | 1 | 0 | 0 |
| 10 wickets in match | 0 | 0 | 0 |
| Best bowling | 5/25 | 4/30 | 4/10 |
| Catches/stumpings | 3/– | 5/– | 2/– |
- Source: ESPNcricinfo, 7 April 2026

Arjun Sachin Tendulkar (born 24 September 1999) is an Indian cricketer who plays for Goa in domestic cricket and Lucknow Super Giants in the Indian Premier League. He is the son of former cricketer Sachin Tendulkar.

== Early life and family ==
Tendulkar was born on 24 September 1999 in Mumbai. He is the son of former Indian cricketer Sachin Tendulkar and pediatrician Anjali Tendulkar. He has an elder sister, Sara Tendulkar.

His maternal grandparents are Anand Mehta, an industrialist, and Annabel Mehta (née Lancaster), an English philanthropist who was awarded the Order of the British Empire for her service to underprivileged communities in Mumbai.

On 13 August 2025, Tendulkar got engaged to Saaniya Chandok, the granddaughter of prominent Mumbai businessman Ravi Ghai, in a private ceremony and married her on 5 March 2026 in a traditional Marathi wedding ceremony.

== Career ==
His under-19 debut for India was against Sri Lanka in 2018. He made his T20 debut on 15 January 2021, for Mumbai in the 2020–21 Syed Mushtaq Ali Trophy against Haryana. On debut, he took 1/34 in his three overs.

Mumbai Indians brought him in auction ahead of the 2021 Indian Premier League (IPL). In September 2021, he was selected in Mumbai's senior squad for the first time. He was included in Mumbai's 22-man Syed Mushtaq Ali Trophy squad. However, he was later ruled out of the 2021 IPL due to injury. In February 2022, he was once again bought by the MI. In August 2022, he quit Mumbai to join Goa ahead of the domestic season. He played for them in 2022–23 Syed Mushtaq Ali Trophy.

On 13 December 2022, Tendulkar made his first-class debut against Rajasthan in the Ranji Trophy. He scored his maiden century hitting 120 off 207 balls in the first innings. He made his IPL debut for the Mumbai Indians on 16 April 2023 against the Kolkata Knight Riders. He claimed his first IPL wicket in a match against Sunrisers Hyderabad by dismissing Bhuvneshwar Kumar. Ahead of the 2026 IPL Season, he was traded over to Lucknow Super Giants as a part of a swap deal involving Shardul Thakur.
