= Ramesh Tendulkar =

Indian writer (1930–1999)

- Born: 18 December 1930; Alibag, Bombay Presidency, British India (present-day Maharashtra, India)
- Died: 19 May 1999 (aged 68); Mumbai, Maharashtra, India
- Spouse: Rajni Tendulkar
- Children: 4 (incl. Sachin Tendulkar)
- Relatives: Arjun Tendulkar (grandson)

Ramesh Tendulkar (18 December 1930 – 19 May 1999) was an Indian Marathi poet and novelist. He was the father of cricketer Sachin Tendulkar.

== Early life and education ==
Tendulkar was born in Alibag, Maharashtra. He used to live at Thikrul Naka, Alibag. He completed his primary and secondary education from Konkan Education Society, Alibag. He went to Mumbai for pursuing his higher education. After completing his education, Tendulkar was a professor at Kirti M. Doongursee College, Mumbai in the 1960

== Literary career ==
Tendulkar published many collections. The following is a partial list of them.

- बालकवींची कविता : तीन संदर्भ : Bālakavīncī Kavitā : Tīn Sandarbha
- मानस लहरी : Mānas Laharī
- प्राजक्त : Prājakta
- मराठी रोमँटिक काव्यप्रतिभा : Marāṭhī Romaṇṭik Kāvyapratibhā

== Death ==
Ramesh Tendulkar died, on 19 May 1999, after a heart attack at the age of 68.
