= 1997–98 NKP Salve Challenger Trophy =

NKP Salve Challenger Trophy 1997/98
- Date: 9th – 12th October 1997
- Location: Mumbai, Maharashtra, India
- Result: Won by India Seniors
Teams
India Seniors	India A	India B
Captains
(India) Ajay Jadeja	(India) Mohammad Azharuddin	(India) Anil Kumble
Most runs
Vinod Kambli (156)	Mohammad Azharuddin (124)	MSK Prasad (84)
Most wickets
Rajesh Chauhan (7)	Ajit Agarkar (6)	KN Ananthapadmanabhan (5)

The 4th NKP Salve Challenger Trophy was an Indian domestic cricket tournament that was held in Mumbai from 9 October to 12 October 1997. The series involved the domestic and national players from India allocated in India Seniors, India A, and India B. India Seniors won the Challenger trophy after defeating India A by 31 runs in the final.

== Squads ==
India Seniors	India A	India B
Ajay Jadeja (c); Ashu Dani; Gagan Khoda; Vinod Kambli; Amol Muzumdar; Saba Karim (wk); Rajesh Chauhan; Nilesh Kulkarni; Robin Singh; Debashish Mohanty; Arvinder Singh; Nikhil Chopra	Mohammad Azharuddin (c); Hrishikesh Kanitkar; VVS Laxman; Sridharan Sharath; Noel David; Rahul Sanghvi; Nayan Mongia (wk); Wasim Jaffer; Nikhil Haldipur; Sairaj Bahutule; Ajit Agarkar; Dodda Ganesh	Anil Kumble (c); Jatinder Singh; Jatin Paranjpe; Pankaj Dharmani; Sunil Joshi; Amay Khurasiya; Rohan Gavaskar; Sanjay Raul; Robin Singh Jr; KN Ananthapadmanabhan; Sukhbir Singh; MSK Prasad (wk)

- Sachin Tendulkar was excused from playing the Challenger trophy for personal reasons.

== Points Table ==
Pos	Team	Pld	W	L	NR	Pts	NRR
1	India Seniors	2	1	1	0	2	0.227
2	India A	2	1	1	0	2	−0.135
3	India B	2	1	1	0	2	−0.588

== Matches ==
=== Group stage ===
9 October 1997

India A 244/9 (50 overs)	v	India Seniors; 249/4 (45.1 overs)
Wasim Jaffer 58 (94); Rajesh Chauhan 3/38 (10 overs)		Vinod Kambli 89 (110); Ajit Agarkar 1/27 (6 overs)

India Seniors won by 6 wickets.
Wankhede Stadium, Mumbai
Umpires: K Parthasarathy (IND) and SK Bansal (IND)

- India A won the toss and elected to bat.
- Points: India Seniors 2, India A 0

10 October 1997

India B 223/8 (50 overs)	v	India Seniors; 204 (47.4 overs)
MSK Prasad 59 (78); Nikhil Chopra 3/39 (10 overs)		Ajay Jadeja 62 (88); KN Ananthapadmanabhan 5/51 (10 overs)

India B won by 19 runs.
Wankhede Stadium, Mumbai
Umpires: Arani Jayaprakash (IND) and V.K Ramaswamy (IND)

- India B won the toss and elected to bat.
- Points: India B 2, India Seniors 0

11 October 1997

India B 172 (50 overs)	v	India A 174/4 (35.5 overs)
Amay Khurasiya 39 (35); Noel David 3/27 (10 overs)		Mohammad Azharuddin 67* (87); Sukhbir Singh 2/10 (4 overs)

India A won by 6 wickets.
Wankhede Stadium, Mumbai
Umpires: K Parthasarathy (IND) and SK Bansal (IND)

- India B won the toss and elected to bat.
- Points: India A 2, India B 0

== Final ==
12 October 1997

India Seniors; 225/9 (50 overs)	v	India A 194 (50 overs)
Amol Muzumdar 73 (102); Rahul Sanghvi 3/28 (9 overs)		Wasim Jaffer 49 (91); Rajesh Chauhan 4/23 (6.1 overs)

India Seniors won by 31 runs.
Wankhede Stadium, Mumbai
Umpires: Arani Jayaprakash (IND) and V.K Ramaswamy (IND)

- India A won the toss and elected to field.
- India Seniors became the winners of NKP Salve Challenger Trophy 1997/98.
