= 1998–99 NKP Salve Challenger Trophy =

NKP Salve Challenger Trophy 1998/99
- Date: 15–18 October 1998
- Location: Ahmedabad, Gujarat, India
- Result: India A and India B as joint winners
Teams
India Seniors	India A	India B
Captains
(India) Nayan Mongia	(India) Ajay Jadeja	(India) Sourav Ganguly
Most runs
Amay Khurasiya (55)	Ajay Jadeja (50)	
Most wickets
Sairaj Bahutule (3)	Venkatesh Prasad (2); Gyanendra Pandey (2)	

The 5th NKP Salve Challenger Trophy was an Indian domestic cricket tournament that was held in Ahmedabad from 15 October to 18 October 1998. The series involved the domestic and national players from India allocated in India Seniors, India A, and India B.

Due to cyclone all the matches were washed out due to rain except for the first match played between India Seniors and India A.

No play was possible on the final day, and India A shared the trophy with India B, both getting declared as joint winners.

== Squads ==
India Seniors	India A	India B
Nayan Mongia (c & wk); JP Yadav; VVS Laxman; Sujith Somasunder; Rahul Dravid; Hrishikesh Kanitkar; Robin Singh; Ajit Agarkar; Rahul Sanghvi; Harbhajan Singh; Debashish Mohanty; Sairaj Bahutule; ~~Mohammad Azharuddin~~	Ajay Jadeja (c); Saba Karim (wk); Gagan Khoda; Nikhil Haldipur; Amol Muzumdar; Jatin Paranjpe; Venkatesh Prasad; Dodda Ganesh; Nikhil Chopra; Sunil Joshi; Gyanendra Pandey; Jacob Martin	Sourav Ganguly (c); Sachin Tendulkar; Rohan Gavaskar; Devang Gandhi; Sanjay Raul; Amay Khurasiya; Vanka Pratap; Nekkanti Madhukar; Robin Singh Jr; KN Ananthapadmanabhan; Nilesh Kulkarni; MSK Prasad (wk)

- Initially, Mohammad Azharuddin was selected to captain India Seniors, but he opted out of the tournament for personal reasons. Nayan Mongia was named as captain of the side, and JP Yadav was included in the squad as his replacement.

== Points Table ==
Pos	Team	Pld	W	L	NR	Pts	NRR
1	India A	2	1	0	1	3	0.025
2	India B	2	0	0	2	2	0.000
3	India Seniors	2	0	1	1	1	−0.025

== Matches ==
=== Group stage ===
15 October 1998

India A 181/7 (40 overs)	v	India Seniors; 180/8 (40 overs)
Ajay Jadeja 50* (56); Sairaj Bahutule 3/26 (7 overs)		Amay Khurasiya 55 (76); Venkatesh Prasad 2/19 (8 overs)

India A won by 1 run.
Sardar Patel Stadium, Ahmedabad
Umpires: KS Giridharan (IND) and S Choudhary (IND)

- India Seniors won the toss and elected to field.
- Match reduced to 40 overs per side due to overnight rain and wet outfield.
- Points: India A 2, India Seniors 0

16 October 1998

India Seniors	v	India B

Match abandoned without a ball being bowled.
Sardar Patel Stadium, Ahmedabad
Umpires: K Parthasarathy (IND) and Krishna Hariharan (IND)

- Match called off due to rain.
- Points: India Seniors 1, India B 1

17 October 1998

India A	v	India B

Match abandoned without a ball being bowled.
Sardar Patel Stadium, Ahmedabad
Umpires: KS Giridharan (IND) and S Choudhary (IND)

- Match called off due to heavy rains and expected cyclone.
- Points: India A 1, India B 1

== Final ==
18 October 1998

India A	v	India B

Match abandoned without a ball being bowled.
Sardar Patel Stadium, Ahmedabad
Umpires: K Parthasarathy (IND) and Krishna Hariharan (IND)

- Match called off due to wet and soggy outfield.
- India A and India B declared as joint winners of NKP Salve Challenger Trophy 1998/99.
