= 2000–01 NKP Salve Challenger Trophy =

NKP Salve Challenger Trophy 2000/01
- Date: 12 - 15 February 2001
- Location: Chennai, Tamil Nadu, India
- Result: Won by India Seniors
- Player of the series: Hemang Badani (India Seniors)
Teams
| India Seniors | India A | India B |
Captains
| (India) Sourav Ganguly | (India) Rahul Dravid | (India) Robin Singh |
Most runs
| Hemang Badani (238) | Rahul Dravid (194) | Dinesh Mongia (185) |
Most wickets
| Ashish Nehra (5) | Ajit Agarkar (8) | Surinder Singh (3) |

The 7th NKP Salve Challenger Trophy was an Indian domestic cricket tournament that was held in Chennai from 12 February to 15 February 2001. The series involved the domestic and national players from India who were allocated in India Seniors, India A, and India B. India Seniors defeated India A by 4 wickets in the final to become the champions of the tournament.

== Squads ==
| India Seniors | India A | India B |
|---|---|---|
| Sourav Ganguly (c); SS Das; Yuvraj Singh; Hemang Badani; VVS Laxman; Virender Sehwag; Vijay Dahiya (wk); Aashish Kapoor; Debashish Mohanty; Javagal Srinath; Zaheer Khan; Sunil Joshi | Rahul Dravid (c); Sadagoppan Ramesh; Sridharan Sriram; Jacob Martin; Reetinder Singh Sodhi; Hrishikesh Kanitkar; Nayan Mongia (wk); Venkatesh Prasad; Ajit Agarkar; Iqbal Siddiqui; Rahul Sanghvi; WD Balaji Rao | Robin Singh (c); Sachin Tendulkar; JP Yadav; Mohammad Kaif; Dinesh Mongia; Amay Khurasiya; Sukwinder Singh; Nikhil Chopra; Rakesh Patel; Surinder Singh; Dodda Ganesh; Vikram Rathour (wk) |

- Robin Singh was asked to lead India B instead of Sachin Tendulkar, after he chose not to captain the side and contribute as a player instead.

== Points Table ==
| Pos | Team | Pld | W | L | NR | Pts | NRR |
|---|---|---|---|---|---|---|---|
| 1 | India A | 2 | 2 | 0 | 0 | 4 | 0.232 |
| 2 | India Seniors | 2 | 1 | 1 | 0 | 2 | 0.136 |
| 3 | India B | 2 | 0 | 2 | 0 | 0 | −0.401 |

Source: 'Points Table'

== Matches ==
=== Group stage ===
12 February 2001

| India Seniors; 240/9(50 overs) | v | India A 243/6 (47.5 overs) |
| VVS Laxman 78 (72); Ajit Agarkar 3/47 (10 overs) | | Hrishikesh Kanitkar 55 (75); Rajesh Pawar 2/55 (10 overs) |

India A won by 4 wickets.
M. A. Chidambaram Stadium, Chennai
Umpires: Krishna Hariharan (IND) and Satish Gupta (IND)

- India Seniors won the toss and elected to bat.
- Points: India A 2, India Seniors 0

13 February 2001

| India Seniors; 392/6 (50 overs) | v | India B 362 (46.4 overs) |
| Sourav Ganguly 142 (106); Surinder Singh 2/56 (7 overs) | | Dinesh Mongia 102 (87); Ashish Nehra 2/75 (10 overs) |

India Seniors won by 30 runs.
M. A. Chidambaram Stadium, Chennai
Umpires: S Lakshmanan (IND) and Shavir Tarapore (IND)

- India Seniors won the toss and elected to bat.
- Points: India Seniors 2, India B 0

14 February 2001

| India B 284 (49.3 overs) | v | India A 285/4 (48.4 overs) |
| Amay Khurasiya 90 (84); Venkatesh Prasad 4/48 (9.3 overs) | | Rahul Dravid 92 (88); Rakesh Patel 2/63 (10 overs) |

India A won by 6 wickets.
M. A. Chidambaram Stadium, Chennai
Umpires: Satish Gupta (IND) and Krishna Hariharan (IND)

- India B won the toss and elected to bat.
- Points: India A 2, India B 0

== Final ==
15 February 2001

| India A 311/6 (50 overs) | v | India Seniors; 312/6 (48.1 overs) |
| Rahul Dravid 88 (105); Javagal Srinath 2/50 (10 overs) | | Hemang Badani 104* (87); Ajit Agarkar 2/54 (10 overs) |

India Seniors won by 4 wickets.
M. A. Chidambaram Stadium, Chennai
Umpires: S Lakshmanan (IND) and Shavir Tarapore (IND)

- India B won the toss and elected to bat.
- India Seniors became the winners of the NKP Salve Challenger Trophy 2000/01.
