= South African cricket team in India in 1999–2000 =

South Africa cricket team in India in 1999–2000
	India	South Africa
- Dates: 19 February – 19 March 2000
Captains	Sachin Tendulkar (Tests); Sourav Ganguly (ODIs)	Hansie Cronje

Test series
- Result: South Africa won the 2-match series 2–0
Most runs	Sachin Tendulkar (146)	Gary Kirsten (149)
Most wickets	Anil Kumble (12)	Shaun Pollock (9)
- Player of the series: Jacques Kallis (SA)

One Day International series
- Results: India won the 5-match series 3–2
Most runs	Sourav Ganguly (285)	Gary Kirsten (281)
Most wickets	Sunil Joshi (8)	Shaun Pollock (6)
- Player of the series: Sachin Tendulkar (Ind)

The South Africa national cricket team visited India in 2000 for a two-match Test series and a five-match ODI series. The Test teams were led by Hansie Cronje and Sachin Tendulkar respectively for South Africa and India, while the latter's ODI side was led by Sourav Ganguly. South Africa won the Test series 2–0, while India took the ODI series by a 3–2 margin. The ODI series was later marred by a dramatic match fixing scandal. It was the first time that a visiting Test team had won in India for thirteen years, and the last Test matches to be played by Cronje.

== Squads ==
Test squads		ODI squads
India	South Africa	India	South Africa
Sachin Tendulkar (c)	Hansie Cronje (c)	Sachin Tendulkar	Hansie Cronje (c)
Rahul Dravid	Gary Kirsten	Sourav Ganguly (c)	Gary Kirsten
Mohammad Azharuddin	Jacques Kallis	Rahul Dravid	Jacques Kallis
Sourav Ganguly	Lance Klusener	Ajay Jadeja	Lance Klusener
Wasim Jaffer	Mark Boucher (w/k)	Robin Singh	Herschelle Gibbs
Javagal Srinath	Nicky Boje	Sunil Joshi	Nicky Boje
Nayan Mongia (w/k)	Herschelle Gibbs	Mohammad Azharuddin	Mark Boucher (w/k)
Anil Kumble	Daryll Cullinan	Sridharan Sriram	Dale Benkenstein
Ajay Jadeja	Allan Donald	Nikhil Chopra	Derek Crookes
Mohammad Kaif	Shaun Pollock	Javagal Srinath	Shaun Pollock
VVS Laxman	Pieter Strydom	Saba Karim (w/k)	Neil McKenzie
Murali Kartik	Clive Eksteen	Anil Kumble	Pieter Strydom
Nikhil Chopra	Nantie Hayward	Venkatesh Prasad	Steve Elworthy
Ajit Agarkar		Ajit Agarkar	Nantie Hayward
		Sameer Dighe (w/k)	Henry Williams
		T Kumaran

== Tour match ==
19–21 February 2000
Scorecard

South Africans	v	Indian Board President's XI
293/6d (91 overs); Gary Kirsten 56 (79); Harbhajan Singh 2/88 (24 overs)		172 (53.2 overs); Harbhajan Singh 38 (44); Nantie Hayward 4/68 (17 overs)
207/5d (63 overs); Pieter Strydom 63* (114); Debashish Mohanty 2/30 (12 overs)		181/8 (65 overs); Wasim Jaffer 47 (106); Clive Eksteen 5/79 (28 overs)

Match drawn
Brabourne Stadium, Mumbai
Umpires: K. Murali and Sundaram Ravi

- South Africans won the toss and elected to bat.

== Test series ==
=== 1st Test ===
24–28 February 2000
Scorecard

India	v	South Africa
225 (79.2 overs); Sachin Tendulkar 97 (163); Jacques Kallis 3/30 (16 overs)		176 (64 overs); Gary Kirsten 50 (139); Sachin Tendulkar 3/10 (5 overs)
113 (50.2 overs); Rahul Dravid 37 (127); Shaun Pollock 4/24 (12.2 overs)		164/6 (63 overs); Herschelle Gibbs 46 (75); Anil Kumble 4/56 (28 overs)

South Africa won by 4 wickets
Wankhede Stadium, Mumbai
Umpires: David Shepherd (Eng) and S. Venkataraghavan (Ind)
Player of the match: Sachin Tendulkar (Ind)

- India won the toss and elected to bat.
- Wasim Jaffer and Murali Kartik (both Ind), and Nicky Boje (SA) made their Test debut.
- David Shepherd (Eng) officiated his 50th Test.
- Nayan Mongia became the third India wicket-keeper to complete 100 dismissals in Tests.
- Ajit Agarkar and Murali Kartik's 52-run partnership in the first innings was India's against South Africa for that wicket in Tests.
- Hansie Cronje was dismissed for a duck for the eighth time in Tests, the most for any captain.
- Javagal Srinath became the first Indian bowler to claim 50 wickets against South Africa in Tests.
- Anil Kumble surpassed Kapil Dev to become the bowler with most wickets in India in Tests (104).
- Jacques Kallis (SA) passed 2,000 runs in Tests.
- This was India's narrowest defeat in Tests at home, in terms of wickets (4).

=== 2nd Test ===
2–6 March 2000
Scorecard

India	v	South Africa
158 (82.3 overs); Anil Kumble 36 (93); Nicky Boje 2/10 (15 overs)		479 (191.4 overs); Lance Klusener 97 (169); Anil Kumble 6/143 (68.4 overs)
250 (101 overs); Mohammad Azharuddin 102 (170); Nicky Boje 5/83 (38 overs)

South Africa won by an innings and 71 runs
M Chinnaswamy Stadium, Bangalore
Umpires: Russell Tiffin (Zim) and Arani Jayaprakash (Ind)
Player of the match: Nicky Boje (SA)

- India won the toss and elected to bat.
- Nikhil Chopra and Mohammad Kaif (both Ind) made their Test debut.
- Sachin Tendulkar (Ind) surpassed Javed Miandad (Pak) to become the youngest player to reach 6,000 runs in Tests (26 years, 313 days).
- Gary Kirsten became the first South Africa player to reach 4,000 runs in Tests.
- Mohammad Azharuddin (Ind) played his last Test. His century meant, as of 2020, he is among only five players to have scored hundreds in their first and final Tests.

== ODI series ==
=== 1st ODI ===
9 March
Scorecard

South Africa; 301/3 (50 overs)	v	India; 302/7 (49.2 overs)
Gary Kirsten 115 (123); Rahul Dravid 2/43 (9 overs)		Ajay Jadeja 92 (109); Hansie Cronje 2/48 (8 overs)

India won by 3 wickets
Jawaharlal Nehru Stadium, Kochi
Umpires: M. R. Singh (Ind) and Rangachari Vijayaraghavan (Ind)
Player of the match: Ajay Jadeja (Ind)

- South Africa won the toss and elected to bat.
- Sourav Ganguly captained the Indian team for the first time.

=== 2nd ODI ===
12 March
Scorecard

South Africa; 199 (47.2 overs)	v	India; 203/4 (47.1 overs)
Hansie Cronje 71 (86); Sunil Joshi 4/38 (10 overs)		Sourav Ganguly 105* (139); Shaun Pollock 1/25 (8 overs)

India won by 6 wickets
Keenan Stadium, Jamshedpur
Umpires: Jasbir Singh (Ind) and C. R. Mohite (Ind)
Player of the match: Sourav Ganguly (Ind)

- South Africa won the toss and elected to bat.
- This was India's first win in six ODIs played at this venue.

=== 3rd ODI ===
15 March
Scorecard

India; 248/8 (50 overs)	v	South Africa; 251/8 (48 overs)
Rahul Dravid 73 (109); Jacques Kallis 2/37 (10 overs)		Gary Kirsten 93 (111); Sachin Tendulkar 4/56 (10 overs)

South Africa won by 2 wickets
Nahar Singh Stadium, Faridabad
Umpires: Vijay Chopra (Ind) and T. R. Kashyappan (Ind)
Player of the match: Hansie Cronje (SA)

- South Africa won the toss and elected to field.
- This was T. R. Kashyappan's first ODI as an umpire.
- South Africa were set a target of 249 in 49 overs; they were fined one over due to slow over rate.

=== 4th ODI ===
17 March
Scorecard

South Africa; 282/5 (50 overs)	v	India; 283/6 (49.5 overs)
Jacques Kallis 81 (106); Sunil Joshi 2/69 (10 overs)		Sachin Tendulkar 122 (138); Shaun Pollock 2/54 (9 overs)

India won by 4 wickets
IPCL Sports Complex Ground, Vadodara
Umpires: Krishna Hariharan (Ind) and Ivaturi Shivram (Ind)
Player of the match: Sachin Tendulkar (Ind)

- South Africa won the toss and elected to bat.
- Gary Kirsten (SA) completed 1,000 ODI runs against India.
- Sourav Ganguly and Sachin Tendulkar's partnership of 153 runs was India's highest against South Africa for the first wicket, before the same pair surpassed it in 2001 (193).
- Sachin Tendulkar scored his 25th ODI century.

=== 5th ODI ===
19 March
Scorecard

South Africa; 320/7 (50 overs)	v	India; 310 (48.5 overs)
Lance Klusener 75 (58); Anil Kumble 2/61 (10 overs)		Sachin Tendulkar 93 (89); Lance Klusener 3/59 (9 overs)

South Africa won by 10 runs
Vidarbha Cricket Association Ground, Nagpur
Umpires: S. K. Bansal (Ind) and Francis Gomes (Ind)
Player of the match: Lance Klusener (SA)

- India won the toss and chose to field.
- Sridharan Sriram (Ind) made his ODI debut.
- Herschelle Gibbs scored the fastest half-century by a South Africa batsman in ODIs (30 balls).
- Mark Boucher's 68 was the highest individual score by a South Africa wicket-keeper in ODIs, surpassing Dave Richardson's 53.
- Lance Klusener's 75 was the highest by any South Africa player batting at number eight, surpassing Shaun Pollock's 66, and highest against India.
- Lance Klusener passed 2,000 runs in ODIs. He also became the second South Africa player to complete the double of 2,000 runs and 100 wickets in ODIs.
- Mark Boucher and Lance Klusener's partnership of 114 runs was the highest for the 7th wicket for South Africa and by any team against India for that wicket in ODIs.
- Sachin Tendulkar (Ind) became the second batsman to complete 9,000 runs, and third to complete 1,000 runs against South Africa in ODIs.
- Sachin Tendulkar and Rahul Dravid's partnership of 180 runs was the highest for second wicket against South Africa by any side.
- This was India's highest total against South Africa in ODIs (310).

== See also ==
- South Africa cricket match fixing
