= 2004–05 NKP Salve Challenger Trophy =

NKP Salve Challenger Trophy 2004/05
- Date: 7–10 February 2005
- Location: Mumbai, Maharashtra, India
- Result: Won by India A
Teams
India Seniors	India A	India B
Captains
(India) Sourav Ganguly	(India) Rahul Dravid	(India) Virender Sehwag
Most runs
Shikhar Dhawan (161)	Rahul Dravid (232)	VVS Laxman (94)
Most wickets
Lakshmipathy Balaji (6)	Dinesh Mongia (9)	Ashish Nehra (4); Amit Bhandari (4)

The 10th NKP Salve Challenger Trophy was an Indian domestic cricket tournament that was held in Mumbai from 7 February to 10 February 2005. The series involved the domestic and national players from India who were allocated in India Seniors, India A, and India B. India A defeated India Seniors by 6 wickets in the final to become the champions of the tournament.

== Squads ==
India Seniors	India A	India B
Sourav Ganguly (c); MS Dhoni (wk); Yuvraj Singh; Suresh Raina; Venugopal Rao; Niraj Patel; Irfan Pathan; Anil Kumble; Lakshmipathy Balaji; Gagandeep Singh; Rajesh Pawar; Shikhar Dhawan; Ranadeb Bose	Rahul Dravid (c); Dinesh Karthik (wk); Satyajit Parab; Dheeraj Jadhav; Mohammad Kaif; Dinesh Mongia; Murali Kartik; Ajit Agarkar; Zaheer Khan; Rudra Pratap Singh; Yusuf Pathan; Shib Shankar Paul	Virender Sehwag (c); Gautam Gambhir; Parthiv Patel (wk); VVS Laxman; Sridharan Sriram; Rohan Gavaskar; Ramesh Powar; Joginder Sharma; Ashish Nehra; Amit Bhandari; Robin Uthappa; Ambati Rayudu

== Points Table ==
Pos	Team	Pld	W	L	NR	Pts	NRR
1	India A	2	2	0	0	8	0.240
2	India Seniors	2	1	1	0	4	0.146
3	India B	2	0	2	0	0	−0.396

== Matches ==
=== Group stage ===
7 February 2005

India Seniors; 280/9(50 overs)	v	India A 286/4 (49.4 overs)
Yuvraj Singh 100 (91); Dinesh Mongia 4/48 (10 overs)		Dheeraj Jadhav 79 (109); Rajesh Pawar 2/55 (10 overs)

India A won by 6 wickets.
Wankhede Stadium, Mumbai
Umpires: Krishna Hariharan (IND) and Ivaturi Shivram (IND)

- India Seniors won the toss and elected to bat.
- Points: India A 4, India Seniors 0

8 February 2005

India B 275 (50 overs)	v	India Seniors; 278/2 (46.4 overs)
VVS Laxman 67 (69); Lakshmipathy Balaji 4/66 (10 overs)		Shikhar Dhawan 126 (124); Amit Bhandari 2/45 (10 overs)

India Seniors won by 8 wickets.
Wankhede Stadium, Mumbai
Umpires: Tej Handu (IND) and Arani Jayaprakash (IND)

- India B won the toss and elected to bat.
- Points: India Seniors 4, India B 0

9 February 2005

India A 294/9 (50 overs)	v	India B 204 (36.5 overs)
Rahul Dravid 115 (96); Ashish Nehra 3/43 (10 overs)		Robin Uthappa 66 (48); Murali Kartik 3/26 (5.5 overs); Dinesh Mongia 3/47 (10 overs)

India A won by 90 runs.
Wankhede Stadium, Mumbai
Umpires: Ivaturi Shivram (IND) and Tej Handu (IND)

- India B won the toss and elected to bat.
- Points: India A 4, India B 0

== Final ==
10 February 2005

India Seniors; 211 (47.2 overs)	v	India A 212/4 (48.4 overs)
Niraj Patel 65 (66); RP Singh 3/42 (9 overs)		Rahul Dravid 72* (102); Lakshmipathy Balaji 2/49 (9 overs)

India A won by 6 wickets.
Wankhede Stadium, Mumbai
Umpires: Arani Jayaprakash (IND) and Krishna Hariharan (IND)

- India Seniors won the toss and elected to bat.
- India A became the winners of the NKP Salve Challenger Trophy 2004/05.
