= 2003–04 NKP Salve Challenger Trophy =

Former Indian domestic cricket contest

NKP Salve Challenger Trophy 2003/04
- Date: 10th – 13th September 2003
- Location: Bangalore, Karnataka, India
- Result: Won by India A
- Player of the series: Yuvraj Singh (India B)
Teams
India Seniors	India A	India B
Captains
(India) Sourav Ganguly	(India) Anil Kumble	(India) Rahul Dravid
Most runs
Hemang Badani (134)	Sachin Tendulkar (176)	Yuvraj Singh (188)
Most wickets
Lakshmipathy Balaji (7)	Anil Kumble (6)	Dinesh Mongia (7)

The 9th NKP Salve Challenger Trophy was an Indian domestic cricket tournament that was held in Bangalore from 10 September to 13 September 2003. The series involved the domestic and national players from India, who were allocated in India Seniors, India A, and India B. India A defeated India B by 99 runs in the final to become the champions of the tournament.

== Squads ==
India Seniors	India A	India B
Sourav Ganguly (c); VVS Laxman; Hemang Badani; Ambati Rayudu; Sanjay Bangar; Parthiv Patel (wk); Amit Mishra; Murali Kartik; Harbhajan Singh; Zaheer Khan; Lakshmipathy Balaji; Reetinder Singh Sodhi; Akash Chopra	Anil Kumble (c); Sachin Tendulkar; Gautam Gambhir; Rohan Gavaskar; Mohammad Kaif; Wasim Jaffer; Sridharan Sriram; Ajay Ratra (wk); Irfan Pathan; Ajit Agarkar; Mithun Manhas; Ramesh Powar	Rahul Dravid (c); SS Das; Satyajit Parab; Vijay Bharadwaj; Yuvraj Singh; Dinesh Mongia; Thilak Naidu (wk); Jai P Yadav; Aavishkar Salvi; Siddharth Trivedi; Sairaj Bahutule; Amit Bhandari; Sarandeep Singh

== Points Table ==
Pos	Team	Pld	W	L	NR	Pts	NRR
1	India B	2	2	0	0	8	1.611
2	India A	2	1	1	0	4	−0.611
3	India Seniors	2	0	2	0	0	−0.900

Source: 'Points Table'

== Matches ==
=== Group stage ===
10 September 2003

India A 276/8(50 overs)	v	India Seniors; 249/8 (50 overs)
Rohan Gavaskar 79* (94); Lakshmipathy Balaji 5/50 (10 overs)		Hemang Badani 73 (80); Anil Kumble 3/56 (10 overs)

India A won by 27 runs.
M. Chinnaswamy Stadium, Bangalore
Umpires: SK Sharma (IND) and Subroto Porel (IND)
Player of the match: Rohan Gavaskar (India A)

- India A won the toss and elected to bat.
- Points: India A 4, India Seniors 0

11 September 2003

India B 338/5 (50 overs)	v	India Seniors; 275/7 (50 overs)
Rahul Dravid 107 (97); Lakshmipathy Balaji 2/76 (10 overs)		Sanjay Bangar 63 (66); Dinesh Mongia 2/33 (6 overs)

India B won by 63 runs.
M. Chinnaswamy Stadium, Bangalore
Umpires: Narendra Menon (IND) and Satish Gupta (IND)
Player of the match: Rahul Dravid (India B)

- India B won the toss and elected to bat.
- Points: India B 4, India Seniors 0

12 September 2003

India B 340/2 (50 overs)	v	India A 225 (35.2 overs)
Dinesh Mongia 121 (117); Anil Kumble 2/73 (10 overs)		Gautam Gambhir 58 (37); Dinesh Mongia 4/31 (8 overs)

India B won by 82 runs (D/L method).
M. Chinnaswamy Stadium, Bangalore
Umpires: SK Sharma (IND) and Subroto Porel (IND)
Player of the match: Yuvraj Singh & Dinesh Mongia (India B)

- India B won the toss and elected to bat.
- Due to rain, India A's target was reduced to 308 runs from 40 overs.
- Points: India B 4, India A 0

== Final ==
13 September 2003

India A 314/6 (50 overs)	v	India B 215 (41.1 overs)
Sachin Tendulkar 88 (95); Amit Bhandari 2/48 (5 overs)		Sairaj Bahutule 55* (44); Ramesh Powar 3/29 (7.1 overs)

India A won by 99 runs.
M. Chinnaswamy Stadium, Bangalore
Umpires: Krishna Hariharan (IND) and SK Sharma (IND)
Player of the match: Sachin Tendulkar & S Sriram (India A)

- India A won the toss and elected to bat.
- India A became the winners of the NKP Salve Challenger Trophy 2003/04.
