= 1994–95 NKP Salve Challenger Trophy =

NKP Salve Challenger Trophy 1994/95
- Date: 18th — 21st March 1995
- Location: Kolkata, West Bengal, India
- Result: Won by India Seniors
Teams
India Seniors	India A	India B
Captains
(India) Mohammad Azharuddin	(India) Sanjay Manjrekar	(India) Ajay Sharma
Most runs
Sachin Tendulkar (206)	Sanjay Manjrekar (156)	Sourav Ganguly (104)
Most wickets
Javagal Srinath (6)	Sairaj Bahutule (5)	Atul Wassan (2)

The 1st NKP Salve Challenger Trophy or Kedia Cup was an Indian domestic cricket tournament that was held in Kolkata from 18 March to 21 March 1995. The series was invented to involve the domestic and national players from India to showcase their talent, and were allocated in India Seniors, India A, and India B accordingly. The inaugural edition was won by India Seniors after they defeated India A by 73 runs in the final.

== Squads ==
India Seniors	India A	India B
Mohammad Azharuddin (c); Sachin Tendulkar; Navjot Singh Sidhu; Vinod Kambli; Ajay Jadeja; Manoj Prabhakar; Nayan Mongia (wk); Javagal Srinath; Prashant Vaidya; Anil Kumble; Venkatapathy Raju; Aashish Kapoor	Sanjay Manjrekar (c); Rahul Dravid; Vikram Rathour (wk); Gagan Khoda; Amol Muzumdar; Robin Singh; Avinash Vaidya; Venkatesh Prasad; Paras Mhambrey; Utpal Chatterjee; Rajesh Chauhan; Sairaj Bahutule	Ajay Sharma (c); Sourav Ganguly; Manoj Joglekar; Bhupinder Singh; Rizwan Shamshad; Sameer Dighe (wk); Atul Wassan; Salil Ankola; Pudiyangum Krishnakumar; Pankaj Dharmani; Kanwaljit Singh; Nilesh Kulkarni

== Points Table ==
Pos	Team	Pld	W	L	NR	Pts	NRR
1	India Seniors	2	2	0	0	4	0.757
2	India A	2	1	1	0	2	−0.097
3	India B	2	0	2	0	0	−0.650

== Matches ==
=== Group stage ===
18 March 1995

India A 214/7 (50 overs)	v	India Seniors; 218/4 (47.1 overs)
Rahul Dravid 50 (80); Manoj Prabhakar 2/28 (10 overs)		Sachin Tendulkar 68 (56); Utpal Chatterjee 2/35 (10 overs)

India Seniors won by 6 wickets.
Eden Gardens, Kolkata
Umpires: SK Porel (IND) and Jasbir Singh (IND)

- India Seniors won the toss and elected to field.
- Points: India Seniors 2, India A 0

19 March 1995

India B 219/8 (50 overs)	v	India Seniors; 220/3 (39 overs)
Sourav Ganguly 69 (91); Javagal Srinath 2/27 (7 overs)		Sachin Tendulkar 84 (55); Atul Wassan 1/49 (10 overs)

India Seniors won by 7 wickets.
Eden Gardens, Kolkata
Umpires: SK Porel (IND) and Jasbir Singh (IND)

- India Seniors won the toss and elected to bat.
- Points: India Seniors 2, India B 0

20 March 1995

India B 224/6 (50 overs)	v	India A 227/6 (49 overs)
Ajay Sharma 64 (79); Venkatesh Prasad 2/43 (10 overs)		Sanjay Manjrekar 117* (138); Sourav Ganguly 2/37 (10 overs)

India A won by 4 wickets.
Eden Gardens, Kolkata
Umpires: S Choudhary (IND) and SK Bansal (IND)

- India B won the toss and elected to bat.
- Points: India A 2, India B 0

== Final ==
21 March 1995

India Seniors; 225 (47.3 overs)	v	India A 152/7 (50 overs)
Sachin Tendulkar 54 (46); Sairaj Bahutule 4/26 (10 overs)		Utpal Chatterjee 37*; Javagal Srinath 2/18 (6 overs)

India Seniors won by 73 runs.
Eden Gardens, Kolkata
Umpires: S Choudhary (IND) and SK Bansal (IND)

- India Seniors won the toss and elected to bat.
- India Seniors became the winners of NKP Salve Challenger Trophy (Kedia Cup) 1994/95.
