= 2005–06 NKP Salve Challenger Trophy =

Indian cricket series edition

NKP Salve Challenger Trophy 2005/06
- Date: 10 – 13 October 2005
- Location: Mohali, Punjab, India
- Result: Won by India Seniors
Teams
India Seniors	India A	India B
Captains
(India) Mohammad Kaif	(India) VVS Laxman	(India) Dinesh Mongia
Most runs
Venugopal Rao (217)	VVS Laxman (158)	Robin Uthappa (135)
Most wickets
Murali Kartik (7)	Ramesh Powar (2)	Sreesanth (7)

The 11th NKP Salve Challenger Trophy was an Indian domestic cricket tournament, played under List A rules, that was held in Mohali from 10 October to 13 October 2005. The series involved the domestic teams from India, which were India Seniors, India A, and India B. India Seniors defeated India B by 3 wickets in the final to become the champions of the tournament.

Also, this tournament marked the last time with team names India Seniors, India A and India B, being used.

== Squads ==
India Seniors	India A	India B
Mohammad Kaif (c); Sachin Tendulkar; Satyajit Parab; Yuvraj Singh; Y Venugopal Rao; MS Dhoni (wk); Harbhajan Singh; Murali Kartik; Irfan Pathan; Ajit Agarkar; Zaheer Khan; JP Yadav; Vidyut Sivaramakrishnan	VVS Laxman (c); Gautam Gambhir; Dheeraj Jadhav; Suresh Raina; Hemang Badani; Niraj Patel; Dinesh Karthik (wk); Ramesh Powar; RP Singh; Lakshmipathy Balaji; VRV Singh; Shahbaz Nadeem; Manoj Tiwary	Dinesh Mongia (c); Shikhar Dhawan; Robin Uthappa; Sridharan Sriram; Sunny Singh; Parthiv Patel (wk); Sreesanth; Ranadeb Bose; Amit Bhandari; Ravikant Shukla; Piyush Chawla; Sreekumar Nair

== Points Table ==
Pos	Team	Pld	W	L	NR	Pts	NRR
1	India B	2	1	1	0	6	1.200
2	India Seniors	2	1	1	0	6	0.400
3	India A	2	1	1	0	6	−1.600

Source: 'Points Table'

== Matches ==
=== Group stage ===
10 October 2005

India Seniors; 289/8 (50 overs)	v	India A 291/9 (49.4 overs)
Y Venugopal Rao 98 (99); RP Singh 2/34 (10 overs)		VVS Laxman 48 (62); Irfan Pathan 3/69 (10 overs)

India A won by 1 wicket.
PCA Stadium, Mohali
Umpires: Ivaturi Shivram (IND) and MR Singh (IND)
Player of the match: Y Venugopal Rao (India Seniors)

- India Seniors won the toss and elected to bat.
- Points: India A 5, India Seniors 1

11 October 2005

India B 240 (49.4 overs)	v	India Seniors; 242/3 (45.5 overs)
Parthiv Patel 53 (44); Irfan Pathan 3/39 (9 overs)		Y Venugopal Rao 101* (125); Sreesanth 2/63 (10 overs)

India Seniors won by 7 wickets.
PCA Stadium, Mohali
Umpires: Ivaturi Shivram (IND) and Tej Handu (IND)
Player of the match: Yuvraj Singh (India Seniors)

- India Seniors won the toss and elected to field.
- Points: India Seniors 5, India B 1

12 October 2005

India A 260/8 (50 overs)	v	India B 264/3 (38.5 overs)
VVS Laxman 143 (143); Sreesanth 2/44 (10 overs)		Robin Uthappa 116 (93); VRV Singh 1/51 (10 overs)

India B won by 7 wickets.
PCA Stadium, Mohali
Umpires: MR Singh (IND) and Tej Handu (IND)
Player of the match: Robin Uthappa (India B)

- India B won the toss and elected to field.
- Points: India B 5, India A 1

== Final ==
13 October 2005

India B 177 (42.5 overs)	v	India Seniors; 181/7 (39 overs)
Parthiv Patel 39 (62); Murali Kartik 5/29 (9.5 overs)		Vidyut Sivaramakrishnan 87 (107); Sreesanth 3/32 (9 overs)

India Seniors won by 3 wickets.
PCA Stadium, Mohali
Umpires: Ivaturi Shivram (IND) and MR Singh (IND)
Player of the match: Vidyut Sivaramakrishnan (India Seniors)

- India Seniors won the toss and elected to field.
