= 1995–96 NKP Salve Challenger Trophy =

NKP Salve Challenger Trophy 1995/96
- Date: 28 – 31 December 1995
- Location: Hyderabad, Andhra Pradesh, India
- Result: Won by India Seniors
Teams
India Seniors	India A	India B
Captains
(India) Mohammad Azharuddin	(India) Sachin Tendulkar	(India) Pravin Amre
Most runs
Navjot Singh Sidhu (142)	Rahul Dravid (164)	Pankaj Dharmani (61)
Most wickets
Anil Kumble (5)	Venkatapathy Raju (11)	Rajesh Chauhan (4)

The 2nd NKP Salve Challenger Trophy or Liberty Cup was an Indian domestic cricket tournament that was held in Hyderabad from 28 December to 31 December 1995. The series involved the domestic and national players from India allocated in India Seniors, India A, and India B. India Seniors won the Challenger trophy after defeating India A by 33 runs in the final.

== Squads ==
India Seniors	India A	India B
Mohammad Azharuddin (c); Navjot Singh Sidhu; Manoj Prabhakar; Vinod Kambli; Sanjay Manjrekar; Ajay Jadeja; Nayan Mongia (wk); Javagal Srinath; Venkatesh Prasad; Anil Kumble; Utpal Chatterjee; Aashish Kapoor	Sachin Tendulkar (c); Sourav Ganguly; Rahul Dravid; Vikram Rathour (wk); Amol Muzumdar; Bhupinder Singh Jr.; Saba Karim; Paras Mhambrey; Salil Ankola; Venkatapathy Raju; Narendra Hirwani; Margashayam Venkataramana	Pravin Amre (c); Gagan Khoda; Surendra Bhave; Pankaj Dharmani; VVS Laxman; Sanjay Raul; Prashant Vaidya; David Johnson; Sameer Dighe (wk); Rajesh Chauhan; Feroze Ghayas; Bharati Vij

== Points Table ==
Pos	Team	Pld	W	L	NR	Pts	NRR
1	India A	2	2	0	0	4	0.576
2	India Seniors	2	1	1	0	2	−0.106
3	India B	2	0	2	0	0	−0.364

== Matches ==
=== Group stage ===
28 December 1995

India A 183/7 (50 overs)	v	India Seniors; 166 (49.5 overs)
Sachin Tendulkar 52 (85); Utpal Chatterjee 2/25 (10 overs)		Nayan Mongia 45 (46); Venkatapathy Raju 6/39 (10 overs)

India A won by 17 runs.
Lal Bahadur Shastri Stadium, Hyderabad
Umpires: VK Ramaswamy (IND) and Jasbir Singh (IND)

- India Seniors won the toss and elected to field.
- Points: India A 2, India Seniors 0

29 December 1995

India Seniors; 178 (49.4 overs)	v	India B 174/8 (50 overs)
Manoj Prabhakar 48 (108); Bharati Vij 3/38 (10 overs)		Pankaj Dharmani 53 (97); Anil Kumble 2/29 (10 overs)

India Seniors won by 4 runs.
Lal Bahadur Shastri Stadium, Hyderabad
Umpires: Jasbir Singh (IND) and SK Bansal (IND)

- India Seniors won the toss and elected to bat.
- Points: India Seniors 2, India B 0

30 December 1995

India A 190/8 (50 overs)	v	India B 110 (38 overs)
Rahul Dravid 78* (120); Prashant Vaidya 3/44 (10 overs)		Bharati Vij 19*; Venkatapathy Raju 2/7 (6 overs)

India A won by 80 runs.
Lal Bahadur Shastri Stadium, Hyderabad
Umpires: Arani Jayaprakash (IND) and SK Bansal (IND)

- India A won the toss and elected to bat.
- Points: India A 2, India B 0

== Final ==
31 December 1995

India Seniors; 213/7 (50 overs)	v	India A 180/9 (50 overs)
Navjot Singh Sidhu 81 (117); Venkatapathy Raju 3/40 (10 overs)		Rahul Dravid 56 (85); Venkatesh Prasad 3/32 (10 overs)

India Seniors won by 33 runs.
Lal Bahadur Shastri Stadium, Hyderabad
Umpires: VK Ramaswamy (IND) and SK Bansal (IND)

- India Seniors won the toss and elected to bat.
- India Seniors became the winners of NKP Salve Challenger Trophy (Liberty Cup) 1995/96.
