= Sri Lankan cricket team in India in 2005–06 =

International cricket tour

	Sri Lanka	India
- Dates: 22 October 2005 – 22 December 2005
Captains	Marvan Atapattu	Rahul Dravid

Test series
- Result: India won the 3-match series 2–0
Most runs	Mahela Jayawardene (255)	Irfan Pathan (202)
Most wickets	Muttiah Muralitharan (16)	Anil Kumble (20)
- Player of the series: Anil Kumble (Ind)

One Day International series
- Results: India won the 7-match series 6–1
Most runs	Kumar Sangakkara (296)	MS Dhoni (346)
Most wickets	Muttiah Muralitharan (6)	Ajit Agarkar (12)
- Player of the series: MS Dhoni (Ind)

The Sri Lanka national cricket team toured India for cricket matches in October, November and December 2005. The tour was split into two legs, as India hosted South Africa for a One Day International series in between the India–Sri Lanka ODIs (which were played between 25 October and 12 November) and the Tests, which took place in December. Before the ODI series, India were ranked seventh on the ICC ODI Championship table, while Sri Lanka were second, and the Indian team had officially changed captains with Rahul Dravid taking over from Sourav Ganguly. However, India defied the rankings, winning the first four ODIs of seven to secure the series, and ended up with a 6–1 win despite resting captain Dravid and letting opener Virender Sehwag take over the helm for the sixth ODI. Sanath Jayasuriya, Sri Lanka's opener with 100 Tests and 345 ODIs, was dropped for the Tests after tallying 86 runs in the six ODIs, while Rahul Dravid moved up 18 places on the ICC player rankings with 312 runs for twice out. India's wicket-keeper MS Dhoni also made his mark, being the second highest averaging batsman of the series, and he made 183 not out in 3rd ODI matches at Jaipur, which was at the time the sixth-highest innings by a batsman in an ODI.

The Test series was won by India as well, this time 2–0, with three and a half days of play of the first Test lost due to rain. In the second Test, India took a 60-run lead on first innings after Anil Kumble took six for 72, and four half-centuries (from Irfan Pathan, Yuvraj Singh, Rahul Dravid and MS Dhoni) gave India 375 more runs before declaring. Kumble then completed a ten-for in the match as Sri Lanka were bowled out for 247, losing by 188 runs. In the second match, the margin of victory was even more convincing, Kumble getting seven wickets and Harbhajan Singh ten as Sri Lanka were bowled out for 206 and 249 on their way to a 259-run loss.

== Squads ==
ODI		Test	
Sri Lanka	India	Sri Lanka	India
Marvan Atapattu (c); Kumar Sangakkara (wk); Russel Arnold; Upul Chandana; Tillakaratne Dilshan; Dilhara Fernando; Sanath Jayasuriya; Mahela Jayawardene; Dilhara Lokuhettige; Farveez Maharoof; Muttiah Muralitharan; Thilan Samaraweera; Upul Tharanga; Chaminda Vaas; Nuwan Zoysa	Rahul Dravid (c); MS Dhoni (wk); Ajit Agarkar; Gautam Gambhir; Harbhajan Singh; Murali Kartik; Irfan Pathan; Suresh Raina; Virender Sehwag; R. P. Singh; S. Sreesanth; Sachin Tendulkar; Venugopal Rao; JP Yadav; Yuvraj Singh	Marvan Atapattu (c); Mahela Jayawardene (vc); Avishka Gunawardene; Tillakaratne Dilshan; Thilan Samaraweera; Rangana Herath; Chamara Kapugedera; Lasith Malinga; Jehan Mubarak; Sajeewa Weerakoon; Kumar Sangakkara (wk); Malinga Bandara; Muttiah Muralitharan; Dilhara Fernando; Chaminda Vaas	Rahul Dravid (c); MS Dhoni (wk); Ajit Agarkar; Gautam Gambhir; Harbhajan Singh; Murali Kartik; Irfan Pathan; Suresh Raina; Virender Sehwag; R. P. Singh; S. Sreesanth; Sachin Tendulkar; Venugopal Rao; JP Yadav; Yuvraj Singh; Wasim Jaffer

For the sixth and seventh ODI matches Venugopal Rao and JP Yadav was originally replaced by Mohammad Kaif and V. R. V. Singh V. R. V. Singh failed a fitness test and Yadav was called up again.[3] Ganguly was replaced by Wasim Jaffer for the third Test.[5] Chamara Kapugedera was originally selected for the Test squad, but suffered a lateral ligament and was replaced by Mubarak.[4]

== Tour matches ==
=== 50-over: Mumbai Cricket Association President's XI v Sri Lankans ===
22 October
Scorecard

Sri Lankans; 267/9 (50 overs)	v	Mumbai Cricket Association President's XI; 268/7 (49.5 overs)
Farveez Maharoof 64* (45); Abhishek Nayar 3/40 (10 overs)		Vinayak Mane 75 (110); Nuwan Zoysa 2/41 (9 overs)

Mumbai Cricket Association President's XI won by 3 wickets
Wankhede Stadium, Mumbai
Umpires: Sameer Bandekar (Ind) and Suresh Shastri (Ind)

- Mumbai Cricket Association President's XI won the toss and elected to field.

=== First-class: Indian Board President's XI v Sri Lankans ===
26–28 November
Scorecard

Indian Board President's XI	v	Sri Lankans
317/4d (75 overs); Robin Uthappa 76 (96); Malinga Bandara 2/61 (20 overs)		171/9d (59 overs); Kumar Sangakkara 43 (84); Amit Mishra 4/64 (18 overs)

Match drawn
M. Chinnaswamy Stadium, Bangalore
Umpires: Tej Handu (Ind) and Shavir Tarapore (Ind)

- Sri Lankans won the toss and elected to field.
- No play was possible on day 1 and play did not commence until 13:30 on day 2.

== ODI series ==
=== 1st ODI ===
25 October
09:00
Scorecard

India; 350/6 (50 overs)	v	Sri Lanka; 198 (35.4 overs)
Sachin Tendulkar 93 (96); Tillakaratne Dilshan 2/40 (6 overs)		Kumar Sangakkara 43 (37); Harbhajan Singh 3/35 (10 overs)

India won by 152 runs
Vidarbha Cricket Association Ground, Nagpur
Umpires: Billy Bowden (NZ) and K Hariharan (Ind)
Player of the match: Rahul Dravid (Ind)

- India won the toss and elected to bat.
- S. Sreesanth (Ind) made his ODI debut.

=== 2nd ODI ===
28 October
14:30 (D/N)
Scorecard

Sri Lanka; 122 (35.4 overs)	v	India; 123/2 (20.2 overs)
Kumar Sangakkara 27 (31); Irfan Pathan 4/37 (8 overs)		Sachin Tendulkar 67* (69); Farveez Maharoof 1/19 (3 overs)

India won by 8 wickets
Punjab Cricket Association Stadium, Mohali
Umpires: Billy Bowden (NZ) and Arani Jayaprakash (Ind)
Player of the match: Irfan Pathan (Ind)

- India won the toss and elected to field.

=== 3rd ODI ===
31 October
Scorecard

Sri Lanka; 298/4 (50 overs)	v	India; 303/4 (46.1 overs)
Kumar Sangakkara 138* (147); Ajit Agarkar 2/62 (10 overs)		MS Dhoni 183* (145); Muttiah Muralitharan 2/46 (10 overs)

India won by 6 wickets
Sawai Mansingh Stadium, Jaipur
Umpires: Billy Bowden (NZ) and Krishna Hariharan (Ind)
Player of the match: MS Dhoni (Ind)

- Sri Lanka won the toss and elected to bat.
- MS Dhoni (Ind) made the highest individual score by a wicket-keeper in ODIs.

=== 4th ODI ===
3 November
09:00
Scorecard

Sri Lanka; 261 (49.5 overs)	v	India; 262/6 (45.4 overs)
Marvan Atapattu 87 (100); Ajit Agarkar 5/44 (9.5 overs)		Rahul Dravid 63 (72); Muttiah Muralitharan 3/35 (9 overs)

India won by 4 wickets
Nehru Stadium, Pune
Umpires: Billy Bowden (NZ) and Arani Jayaprakash (Ind)
Player of the match: Ajit Agarkar (Ind)

- India won the toss and elected to field.

=== 5th ODI ===
6 November
14:30 (D/N)
Scorecard

India; 285/8 (50 overs)	v	Sri Lanka; 286/5 (47.4 overs)
Gautam Gambhir 103 (97); Farveez Maharoof 4/20 (5 overs)		Tillakaratne Dilshan 81* (67); Ajit Agarkar 2/59 (9.4 overs)

Sri Lanka won by 5 wickets
Sardar Patel Stadium, Motera, Ahmedabad
Umpires: Mark Benson (Eng) and Krishna Hariharan (Ind)
Player of the match: Tillakaratne Dilshan (SL)

- Sri Lanka won the toss and elected to field.

=== 6th ODI ===
9 November
09:00
Scorecard

Sri Lanka; 196 (42.5 overs)	v	India; 197/3 (34.5 overs)
Tillakaratne Dilshan 59 (63); RP Singh 4/35 (8.5 overs)		Yuvraj Singh 79* (67); Dilhara Fernando 2/58 (10 overs)

India won by 7 wickets
Madhavrao Scindia Cricket Ground, Rajkot
Umpires: Mark Benson (Eng) and Arani Jayaprakash (Ind)
Player of the match: RP Singh (Ind)

- India won the toss and elected to field.

=== 7th ODI ===
12 November
09:00
Scorecard

Sri Lanka; 244/9 (50 overs)	v	India; 245/5 (39.3 overs)
Russel Arnold 68 (69); RP Singh 3/33 (10 overs)		MS Dhoni 80 (73); Nuwan Zoysa 2/47 (7 overs)

India won by 5 wickets
IPCL Sports Complex Ground, Vadodara
Umpires: Mark Benson (Eng) and Krishna Hariharan (Ind)
Player of the match: Irfan Pathan (Ind)

- Sri Lanka won the toss and elected to bat.

== Test series ==
=== 1st Test ===
2–6 December
Scorecard

India	v	Sri Lanka
167 (73.2 overs); Virender Sehwag 36 (28); Chaminda Vaas 4/20 (21 overs)		168/4 (43 overs); Mahela Jayawardene 71 (80)

Match drawn
MA Chidambaram Stadium, Chepauk, Chennai
Umpires: Mark Benson (Eng) and Daryl Harper (Aus)
Player of the match: Chaminda Vaas (SL)

- India won the toss and elected to bat.
- Rain delayed play on days 1, 2 and 3.
- MS Dhoni (Ind) made his Test debut.

=== 2nd Test ===
10–14 December
Scorecard

India	v	Sri Lanka
290 (96.4 overs); Sachin Tendulkar 109 (196); Muttiah Muralitharan 7/100 (38.4 overs)		230 (83.3 overs); Marvan Atapattu 88 (202); Anil Kumble 6/72 (28 overs)
375/6d (105 overs); Irfan Pathan 93 (143); Chaminda Vaas 2/65 (21 overs)		247 (91.2 overs); Marvan Atapattu 67 (129); Anil Kumble 4/85 (36 overs)

India won by 188 runs
Feroz Shah Kotla Ground, Delhi
Umpires: Nadeem Ghauri (Pak) and Simon Taufel (Aus)
Player of the match: Anil Kumble (Ind)

- India won the toss and elected to bat.

=== 3rd Test ===
18–22 December
Scorecard

India	v	Sri Lanka
398 (122.4 overs); VVS Laxman 104 (237); Lasith Malinga 3/113 (32 overs)		206 (63.2 overs); Tillakaratne Dilshan 65 (109); Harbhajan Singh 7/62 (22.2 overs)
316/9d (71 overs); Yuvraj Singh 75 (83); Malinga Bandara 3/84 (19 overs)		249 (92.3 overs); Tillakaratne Dilshan 65 (123); Anil Kumble 5/89 (34.3 overs)

India won by 259 runs
Sardar Patel Gujarat Stadium, Motera, Ahmedabad
Umpires: Billy Bowden (NZ) and Nadeem Ghauri (Pak)
Player of the match: Harbhajan Singh (Ind)

- India won the toss and elected to bat.
- Upul Tharanga (SL) made his Test debut.
- Virender Sehwag (Ind) captained India for the first time in Tests.
- Anil Kumble (Ind) played in his 100th Test.
