= 2010–11 NKP Salve Challenger Trophy =

NKP Salve Challenger Trophy 2010/11
- Date: 8 – 11 October 2010
- Location: Indore, Madhya Pradesh, India
- Result: Won by India Blue
Teams
India Blue	India Red	India Green
Captains
(India) Yuvraj Singh	(India) Dinesh Karthik	(India) Subramaniam Badrinath
Most runs
Ajinkya Rahane (186)	Parthiv Patel (109)	Kedar Jadhav (104)
Most wickets
Yo Mahesh (7)	Ashok Dinda (4)	Sarabjit Ladda (5)

The 16th NKP Salve Challenger Trophy was an Indian domestic cricket tournament that was held in Indore from 8 October to 11 October 2010. The series involved the domestic teams from India which were India Blue, India Red, and India Green. India Blue defeated India Red by 140 runs in the final to become the champions of the tournament.

== Squads ==
India Blue	India Red	India Green
Yuvraj Singh (c); Shikhar Dhawan; Shreevats Goswami (wk); Ajinkya Rahane; Manoj Tiwary; Irfan Pathan; Ravindra Jadeja; Wriddhiman Saha (wk); Piyush Chawla; Umesh Yadav; RP Singh; Yo Mahesh; Ganesh Satish; Tanmay Srivastava	Dinesh Karthik (c & wk); Abhinav Mukund; Parthiv Patel (wk); Manish Pandey; Virat Kohli; Saurabh Tiwary; Yusuf Pathan; Iqbal Abdulla; Vinay Kumar; Ashok Dinda; Sudeep Tyagi; Mohnish Mishra; Abu Nechim; Rahul Sharma	Subramaniam Badrinath (c); Naman Ojha (wk); S Aniruddha; Rohit Sharma; Robin Uthappa; Kedar Jadhav; Ravichandran Ashwin; Jaskaran Singh; Abhimanyu Mithun; Jaydev Unadkat; Sarabjit Ladda; Tirumalasetti Suman; Dhawal Kulkarni; Ambati Rayudu

== Points Table ==
Pos	Team	Pld	W	L	NR	Pts	NRR
1	India Blue	2	1	1	0	4	1.038
2	India Red	2	1	1	0	4	−0.498
3	India Green	2	1	1	0	4	−0.605

Source: 'Points Table'

== Matches ==
=== Group stage ===
8 October 2010

India Blue; 251/9 (50 overs)	v	India Red; 252/7 (48.4 overs)
Ajinkya Rahane 84 (95); Sudeep Tyagi 3/40 (9 overs)		Yusuf Pathan 63 (30); Yo Mahesh 2/34 (9 overs)

India Red won by 3 wickets.
Holkar Stadium, Indore
Umpires: Chettithody Shamshuddin (IND) and Suresh Shastri (IND)

- India Blue won the toss and elected to bat.
- Points: India Red 4, India Blue -1

9 October 2010

India Red; 185 (40.3 overs)	v	India Green; 187/4 (37 overs)
Parthiv Patel 86 (100); Sarabjit Ladda 3/46 (10 overs)		Subramaniam Badrinath 67 (76); Ashok Dinda 2/47 (9 overs)

India Green won by 6 wickets.
Holkar Stadium, Indore
Umpires: Sameer Bandekar (IND) and Suresh Shastri (IND)

- India Red won the toss and elected to bat.
- Points: India Green 5, India Red -1

10 October 2010

India Blue; 320/8 (50 overs)	v	India Green; 209 (50 overs)
Shikhar Dhawan 109 (121); Abhimanyu Mithun 2/64 (10 overs)		Kedar Jadhav 71 (70); Yo Mahesh 3/34 (6 overs)

India Blue won by 111 runs.
Holkar Stadium, Indore
Umpires: Chettithody Shamshuddin (IND) and Sameer Bandekar (IND)

- India Blue won the toss and elected to bat.
- Points: India Blue 5, India Green -1

== Final ==
11 October 2010

India Blue; 287/7 (50 overs)	v	India Green; 147 (36.4 overs)
Tanmay Srivastava 103 (103); Abhimanyu Mithun 3/70 (10 overs)		Robin Uthappa 29 (47); RP Singh 3/20 (6.4 overs)

India Blue won by 140 runs.
Holkar Stadium, Indore
Umpires: Chettithody Shamshuddin (IND) and Suresh Shastri (IND)

- India Blue won the toss and elected to bat.
