= English cricket team in India in 2005–06 =

International cricket tour

English cricket team in India in 2005-06
| | India | England |
- Dates: 18 February – 15 April 2006
| Captains | Rahul Dravid | Andrew Flintoff |

Test series
- Result: 3-match series drawn 1–1
| Most runs | Rahul Dravid (309) | Paul Collingwood (272) |
| Most wickets | Anil Kumble (16) | Matthew Hoggard (13) |
- Player of the series: Andrew Flintoff

One Day International series
- Results: India won the 7-match series 5–1
| Most runs | Suresh Raina (242) | Kevin Pietersen (291) |
| Most wickets | Harbhajan Singh (12) | James Anderson (9) |
- Player of the series: Yuvraj Singh

The English cricket team played in India for the 2005-2006 season, touring from February to April 2006. The Test matches were drawn 1-1, while India won the One Day International series 5–1.

Prior to this season, the English cricket team won second place at the ICC Test Championship and won the 2005 Ashes series at home against Australia. Despite these wins, England's captain Michael Vaughan as well as its swing bowler Simon Jones were both injured during the season, with regular Ashley Giles entirely absent. Additionally, stand-in captain Marcus Trescothick left for "personal reasons", leaving Andrew Flintoff to step in as skipper Shanthakumaran Sreesanth, Piyush Chawla and Munaf Patel made their debuts for the home team.

== Schedule ==
| Date | Match | Venue |
February
| 18-20 | vs Cricket Club of India | Mumbai |
| 23-25 | vs President's XI | Baroda |
March
| 1-5 | 1st Test | Nagpur |
| 9-13 | 2nd Test | Mohali |
| 18-22 | 3rd Test | Mumbai |
| 25 | vs RCA President's XI | Jaipur |
| 28 | 1st ODI | Delhi |
| 31 | 2nd ODI | Faridabad |
April
| 3 | 3rd ODI | Goa |
| 6 | 4th ODI | Kochi |
| 9 | 5th ODI | Guwahati |
| 12 | 6th ODI | Jamshedpur |
| 15 | 7th ODI | Indore |

== Squads ==
| England | India |
|---|---|
| Andrew Flintoff (c); Geraint Jones (wk); James Anderson; Ian Bell; Ian Blackwell; Paul Collingwood; Alastair Cook; Steve Harmison; Matthew Hoggard; Kevin Pietersen; Liam Plunkett; Matt Prior; Owais Shah; Andrew Strauss; Shaun Udal; Monty Panesar; Vikram Solanki (Tour ODI c) (ODI only); Kabir Ali (ODI only); Sajid Mahmood (ODI only); Gareth Batty (ODI only); Marcus Trescothick (Home 24 February); Michael Vaughan (Home 27 February); Simon Jones (Home 27 February) | Rahul Dravid (c); Mahendra Singh Dhoni (wk); Virender Sehwag; Wasim Jaffer (Test only); Sachin Tendulkar(Test only); VVS Laxman (Test only); Mohammad Kaif; Suresh Raina; Anil Kumble (Test only); Harbhajan Singh; Piyush Chawla (Test only); Irfan Pathan; Shanthakumaran Sreesanth; R. P. Singh; Yuvraj Singh; Munaf Patel; Piyush Chawla; Gautam Gambhir (ODI only 1–3); Suresh Raina (ODI only); Venugopal Rao (ODI only 6-7); Ajit Agarkar (ODI only); Ramesh Powar (ODI only); Robin Uthappa (ODI 7); V. R. V. Singh (ODI only 6-7); Dinesh Karthik (ODI 7) |

== Tour Matches ==
=== Tour match v Cricket Club of India (18–20 February) ===
England beat Cricket Club of India by 238 runs

England 1st Innings 299 all out (89.3 overs)

Cricket Club of India 1st Innings 251 all out (79.3 overs)

England 2nd Innings 265 all out (61.5 overs)

Cricket Club of India 2nd Innings 75 all out (26.2 overs)

=== Tour match v President's XI (23–25 February) ===
President's XI beat England by 8 wickets

England 1st Innings 238 for 9 (62.2 overs)

President's XI 1st Innings 348 for 8 (103.4 overs)

England 2nd Innings 158 for 9 (65.0 overs)

President's XI 2nd Innings 58 for 2 (17.0 overs)

Note: Munaf Patel took two five-wicket hauls at a combined total of 10-91 for the President's XI and subsequently gained a Test match debut in the Second Test against England.

== Test series ==
=== 1st Test ===
1–5 March
Scorecard

| England | v | India |
| 393 (127.5 overs); Paul Collingwood 134* (252); S Sreesanth 4/95 (28.5 overs) | | 323 (126.5 overs); Mohammad Kaif 91 (263); Matthew Hoggard 6/57 (30.5 overs) |
| 297/3d (87 overs); Alastair Cook 104* (243); Irfan Pathan 2/48 (14 overs) | | 260/6 (78.2 overs); Wasim Jaffer 100 (198); Steve Harmison 2/48 (17.2 overs) |

Match drawn
Vidarbha Cricket Association Ground, Nagpur
Umpires: Aleem Dar (Pak) and Ian Howell (South Africa)
Player of the match: Matthew Hoggard (Eng)

- England won the toss and elected to bat.
- Series level 0-0
- Ian Blackwell (Eng), Alastair Cook (Eng), Monty Panesar (Eng) and S Sreesanth (Ind) all made their Test debuts.

Both Alistair Cook and Monty Panesar made international debuts in this Test for England, as well as a Test debut for ODI veteran Ian Blackwell. On the Indian team Shanthakumaran Sreesanth was the only debutant.

England won the toss and batted first and ended the day on 246/7. Alastair Cook made a debut scoring 60, and Paul Collingwood was 53 not out by the close of play. On day 2, England's lower order batsman assisted Collingwood to reach his maiden test century. England eventually reached a score of 393, with Collingwood unbeaten on 134 not out.

India lost Virender Sehwag early in their reply, but then Wasim Jaffer and Rahul Dravid batted out the day without further loss to take the hosts to 136/1 by the end of day 2.

On day 3, England's seam bowlers, in particular Matthew Hoggard, engineered a middle order collapse. India slumped from 140/1 to 190/7 just after the lunch break. Hoggard took 5 wickets, and Monty Panesar dismissed Sachin Tendulkar to claim his maiden test wicket amid dramatic scenes. However, Mohammad Kaif and Anil Kumble fought back, putting on 128 for the eighth wicket. The day ended with Kaif being clean bowled by Panesar with a spectacular delivery that span out of the rough and just clipped the off stump.

England wrapped up India's first innings very early on day 4 for 323, and began their second innings positively. Alastair Cook scored a century on debut, and Kevin Pietersen scored 87, despite a caught and bowled appeal being turned down by the third umpire early in his innings. This incident distracted the Indians who dropped 3 further catches during the day. England closed the day with a lead of 367 runs, and Cook was unbeaten on 104.

Andrew Flintoff declared overnight to set India a target of 368 to win. India again lost Sehwag early, but Dravid and Jaffer again formed a solid partnership that England were unable to break for two sessions. Scoring was very slow, and it looked like the match was heading for an uneventful draw.

Jaffer reached 100 shortly after tea but was dismissed soon after making the milestone. India then injected some life into the game by making a sudden charge at the target, despite the fact they still needed 170 runs to win. Irfan Pathan and Mahendra Singh Dhoni were promoted up the order to accelerate the scoring, and England had to quickly adopt to a one-day scenario to protect boundaries and try and vary the bowling.

Both these batsmen fell after cameos, and Sachin Tendulkar, who had also played some shots, was then trusted with seeing out the remaining overs. Although India scored 129 in 22 overs, they were still 108 runs short of the target, and eventually an offer for bad light was made with the score on 260/6.

Matthew Hoggard was awarded man of the match for his first innings effort of 6/57. England overall were pleased to hold a strong Indian team to a draw despite several of their key players missing, and went into the second test with renewed confidence.

=== 2nd Test ===
9–13 March
Scorecard

| England | v | India |
| 300 (103.4 overs); Andrew Flintoff 70 (123); Anil Kumble 5/76 (29.4 overs) | | 338 (96.2 overs); Rahul Dravid 95 (208); Andrew Flintoff 4/96 (22 overs) |
| 181 (76.1 overs); Ian Bell 57 (137); Munaf Patel 4/25 (13 overs) | | 144/1 (33 overs); Virender Sehwag 76* (89); Matthew Hoggard 1/24 (8 overs) |

India won by 9 wickets
Punjab Cricket Association Stadium, Mohali
Umpires: Darrell Hair (Aus) and Simon Taufel (Aus)
Player of the match: Anil Kumble (Ind)

- England won the toss and elected to bat.
- India leads the series 1-0.
- Piyush Chawla (Ind) and Munaf Patel (Ind) make their Test debuts.

=== 3rd Test ===
18–22 March
Scorecard

| England | v | India |
| 400 (133.4 overs); Andrew Strauss 128 (240); S Sreesanth 4/70 (22 overs) | | 279 (104.1 overs); MS Dhoni 64 (118); James Anderson 4/40 (19.1 overs) |
| 191 (92.4 overs); Andrew Flintoff 50 (146); Anil Kumble 4/49 (30.4 overs) | | 100 (48.2 overs); Sachin Tendulkar 34 (57); Shaun Udal 4/14 (9.2 overs) |

England won by 212 runs
Wankhede Stadium, Mumbai
Umpires: Darrell Hair (Aus) and Simon Taufel (Aus)
Player of the match: Andrew Flintoff (Eng)

- India won the toss and elected to field.
- England levels the series 1-1.
- Owais Shah (Eng) made his Test debut.
- Rahul Dravid (Ind) played in his 100th Test.

Following their second test defeat, England suffered a further injury blow when Alastair Cook developed an upset stomach on the morning of the match. Owais Shah made his debut for the tourists, and Shaun Udal was also called into the side to replace Liam Plunkett.

England's chances of success in this match were perceived to be low, but they were immediately boosted by Rahul Dravid's curious decision to ask England to bat on winning the toss. It was believed that this decision was based on the perceived weakness of England's spin attack, who would not be able to exploit conditions on the final day of the match.

Andrew Strauss scored 128 to end a run of low scores on the sub continent, and the debutant Owais Shah compiled a good half century before retiring hurt at the tea interval with cramps. England closed day 1 on 272/3 – a promising position.

On day 2, England continued to accumulate runs, but the Indian attack found more consistency than they were able to the previous day. Sri Sreesanth took 4 wickets and triggered a mini collapse, and Munaf Patel also bowled well. Owais Shah returned to continue his innings and reached 88 before being dismissed by Harbhajan Singh. He showed promise as a test player, and was confident enough to engage in dialogue with the Indian bowlers while compiling his innings. The most notable point was Shah visibly laughing having just lofted Harbhajan for a big six. England were eventually all out for 400.

India's reply started with Virender Sehwag, Wasim Jaffer and Sachin Tendulkar all being dismissed cheaply to leave the hosts on 28/3. Tendulkar in particular was a concern for the Indians, taking a long time to score a solitary run and eventually being dismissed after facing 21 deliveries for that single. Rahul Dravid and Yuvraj Singh engineered a recovery to finish the day on 89/3.

On day 3, England's bowlers continued despite finding the hot and humid conditions difficult. They eventually bowled India out for 279, with Geraint Jones taking 5 catches as wicketkeeper. James Anderson took 4 wickets in the innings, including the vital ones of Tendulkar and Dravid. The India total could have been much less were it not for a late order partnership between Anil Kumble and Sreesanth.

England lost two wickets early in their second innings to close day 3 on 31/2. It was clear that the pitch was deteriorating fast, making Dravid's initial decision to field first even more unusual.

Day 4 proved to be a day of traditional style Test cricket, with slow scoring rates achieved throughout. Barely 2 runs per over were managed, and England lost regular wickets as most batsmen struggled to adapt to the conditions. Andrew Flintoff scored 50, and Paul Collingwood and Owais Shah scored 32 and 38 respectively, which would prove to be important contributions.

Andrew Flintoff had stressed to his batsmen before the match the importance of going on and making a big innings once a half century had been reached. He scored exactly 50 in both innings of this match.

England were bowled out for 191 late in the day, and some commentators believed the opportunity for them to force a win had perhaps been lost. For the Indian bowlers, the spinners were the main performers, with Kumble and Harbhajan taking 6 wickets between them. India started their second innings needing 313 to win, a large target given the conditions of the pitch.

The final day started off with India on 18/1 (having lost Irfan Pathan late in the previous day) and the first session was seen out relatively safely, with only 2 wickets falling, one of those being that of the nightwatchman Kumble. Scoring was slow, and Dravid had faced over 50 deliveries for 9 runs by the lunch interval. Tendulkar had scored more freely, but overall the score at lunch was 75/3.

The next session was nothing short of remarkable, as the Indian batting order collapsed in a dramatic fashion. Dravid edged a ball from Flintoff to the wicketkeeper off the third delivery after the lunch break, and Tendulkar was caught at short leg off the bowling of Shaun Udal next over. The Indian batsmen struggled with Udal's bowling, who obtained significant help from the pitch, and he would go on to take 4 wickets in the second innings at a cost of just 14 runs.

Sehwag had been suffering from a back injury and was forced to bat at no 7. He was unable to cope with conditions and was dismissed for a duck by James Anderson. The next dismissal, that of Mahendra Singh Dhoni, was bizarre. Dhoni skied a ball off Udal, only for Monty Panesar to miss the chance as it landed around 10 feet from where he was, despite having ample time to position himself to take it. Unbelievably, Dhoni attempted a similar shot two balls later, and Panesar this time successfully held the chance. Some television commentators were actually confused by events believing the second shot by Dhoni to have been a replay of the original incident. Dhoni left the field to a chorus of boos by the crowd, stunned by England's strikes. At this point, the score was 92/7.

Harbhajan Singh was dismissed next, attempting to slog sweep Udal for six, and Yuvraj Singh edged Flintoff into the slips. With the score on 99/9, the last man Munaf Patel managed a single to bring up the India 100, but he too then fell attempting to slog Udal out of the park. India were bowled out for 100, and had lost 7 wickets in 16 overs, for the addition of 25 runs. England won the match by 212 runs, and had levelled the series.

England regarded the victory to be as great as reclaiming the Ashes, with winning in India always perceived to be a difficult task. It was considered even more incredible, given the loss of key players due to injuries prior to and during the series. India, on the other hand, came under extreme criticism for the loss and questions were asked of Dravid's decision to field first, as well as the batsmen's technique and application during the second innings when they collapsed from 75/3 to 100 all out.

Overall, the test series had been competitive and demonstrated many opportunities of emerging talent on both sides which would potentially benefit these two sides, as well as world cricket in general in the coming years.

== ODI series ==
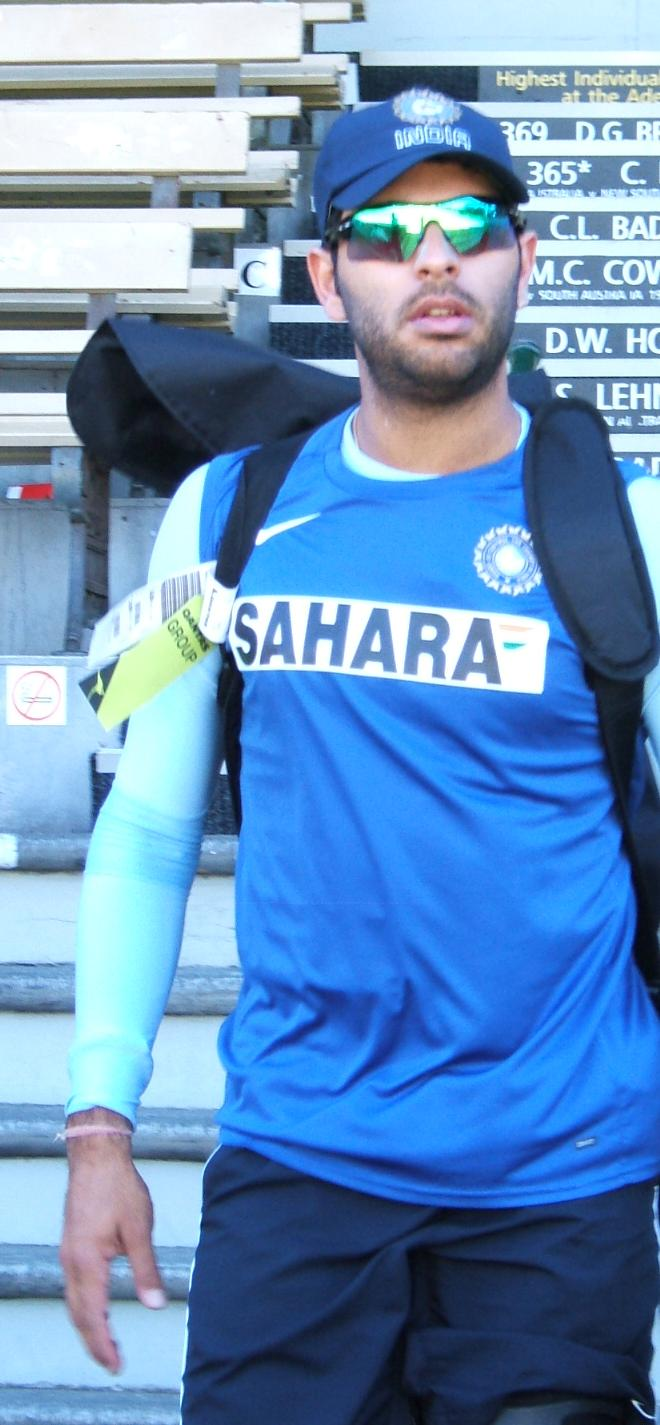
Yuvraj Singh, Man of the Series

=== Tour match vs. Rajasthan President's XI (25 March) ===
Rajasthan President's XI win by five runs

Rajasthan President's XI 260-6 (50 overs)

England 255 (49.5 overs)

Notes: England captain Andrew Flintoff was replaced as captain by Vikram Solanki, as he was at home visiting his newly born baby.

=== 1st ODI ===
28 March
Scorecard

| India; 203 (46.4 overs) | v | England; 164 (38.1 overs) |
| Harbhajan Singh 37 (46); Kabir Ali 4/45 (8.4 overs) | | Kevin Pietersen 46 (49); Harbhajan Singh 5/31 (10 overs) |

India won by 39 runs
Feroz Shah Kotla Ground, Delhi
Umpires: Asad Rauf (Pak) and AV Jayaprakash (Ind)
Player of the match: Harbhajan Singh (Ind)

- England won the toss and chose to field.
- India leads the series 1-0.
- US Travelwriter Paul Theroux was in the stadium and features this match in his book Ghost Train to the Eastern Star.

=== 2nd ODI ===
31 March
Scorecard

| England; 226 (49.5 overs) | v | India; 230/6 (49 overs) |
| Kevin Pietersen 71 (87); Ramesh Powar 3/34 (10 overs) | | Suresh Raina 81* (89); Ian Blackwell 2/39 (9 overs) |

India won by 4 wickets
Nahar Singh Stadium, Faridabad
Umpires: Asad Rauf (Pak) and AV Jayaprakash (Ind)
Player of the match: Suresh Raina (Ind)

- England won the toss and chose to bat.
- India leads the series 2-0.

In the first innings England batsmen Kevin Pietersen tied West Indian Viv Richards' record as the quickest to reach 1,000 runs in ODIs (21 innings). Suresh Raina, with his maiden ODI half-century, and Mahendra Singh Dhoni set a new record for the sixth wicket partnership for India in One-day Internationals.

The fall of the third wicket provided a talking point: Yuvraj Singh swept Ian Blackwell's delivery behind the stumps only for wicket keeper Geraint Jones to make a diving stop and throw the ball at the wicket, dislodging the leg stump and bail. With Singh still in his crease he was given not out, but Indian captain Rahul Dravid decided to take a quick run in the confusion as the ball ricocheted away; Paul Collingwood acted quickly though, and grabbed the ball and ran it into the remaining two stumps and bail just as Dravid made it to the crease. The TV umpire was called for the decision and after much deliberation Dravid was given out.

=== 3rd ODI ===
3 April
Scorecard

| India; 294/6 (50 overs) | v | England; 245 (48.5 overs) |
| Yuvraj Singh 103 (76); Andrew Flintoff 3/56 (9 overs) | | Paul Collingwood 93 (84); Irfan Pathan 4/51 (10 overs) |

India won by 49 runs
Fatorda Stadium, Margao
Umpires: Asad Rauf (Pak) and K Hariharan (Ind)
Player of the match: Yuvraj Singh (Ind)

- India won the toss and chose to bat.
- India leads the series 3-0.
- Munaf Patel (Ind) made his ODI debut.

=== 4th ODI ===
6 April
Scorecard

| England; 237 (48.4 overs) | v | India; 238/6 (47.2 overs) |
| Kevin Pietersen 77 (82); Virender Sehwag 2/31 (6 overs) | | Rahul Dravid 65 (73); Ian Blackwell 2/41 (10 overs) |

India won by 4 wickets
Nehru Stadium, Kochi
Umpires: K Hariharan (Ind) and Rudi Koertzen (South Africa)
Player of the match: Yuvraj Singh (Ind)

- England won the toss and chose to bat.
- India leads the series 4-0.

=== 5th ODI ===
The game was washed out. Heavy rain poured the day before, and the ground could not be dried sufficiently for the game to start. Finally the game was called off by the Umpires' decisions without a ball being bowled due to a soggy outfield, an outcome that angered the fans who had been waiting for the game to start for five hours and they eventually started showing their frustration by hurling stones and setting fire to objects in the stands.

9 April
Scorecard

| India | v | England |

Match abandoned
Nehru Stadium, Guwahati
Umpires: AV Jayaprakash (Ind) and Rudi Koertzen (SA)

- No toss.
- Match abandoned without a ball bowled.

=== 6th ODI ===
12 April
Scorecard

| India; 223 (48 overs) | v | England; 227/5 (42.4 overs) |
| MS Dhoni 96 (106); Sajid Mahmood 3/37 (8 overs) | | Andrew Strauss (retired hurt) 74* (85); Harbhajan Singh 3/30 (10 overs) |

England won by 5 wickets
Keenan Stadium, Jamshedpur
Umpires: K Hariharan (Ind) and Rudi Koertzen (SA)
Player of the match: Andrew Strauss (Eng)

- India won the toss and chose to bat.
- India leads the series 4-1
- V. R. V. Singh (Ind) made his ODI debut.

Twenty-one-year-old V. R. V. Singh made his debut for India, who made a disastrous start to their innings, slipping to 76–5. Mahendra Singh Dhoni (96) and Ramesh Powar (54) lifted the home team to a more respectable total with a century stand for the sixth wicket. Harbhajan Singh was clean bowled by Kevin Pietersen for 4, although Harbhajan did not walk, waiting for the third umpire to be called in to adjudicate on the dismissal before finally swearing at Pietersen as he left the ground. Acting skipper Andrew Strauss (the third acting captain on this tour with Andrew Flintoff resting as 12th man) led England from the front with 74, before retiring hurt with cramp, and they strolled to victory with 43 balls to spare. Ian Blackwell hit a no-ball from Powar for six to reach the target.

=== 7th ODI ===
15 April
Scorecard

| England; 288 (50 overs) | v | India; 289/3 (49.1 overs) |
| Kevin Pietersen 64 (56); S Sreesanth 6/55 (10 overs) | | Robin Uthappa 86 (96); Kabir Ali 1/47 (8 overs) |

India won by 7 wickets
Maharani Usharaje Trust Cricket Ground, Indore
Umpires: AV Jayaprakash (Ind) and Rudi Koertzen (SA)
Player of the match: S Sreesanth (Ind)

- India won the toss and chose to field.
- India won the series 5-1
- Robin Uthappa (Ind) made his ODI debut.

Note: Indian wicket keeper Mahendra Singh Dhoni was replaced by Dinesh Karthik. English captain Andrew Flintoff was again replaced by Andrew Strauss.

Debut of Robin Uthappa as the Indian opener saw him hit 12 fours and one six before being run out by Geraint Jones after James Anderson dived for a ball to stop a boundary and threw it back to the wicket keeper. The batsman, sharing a 166 partnership for the first wicket with skipper Rahul Dravid had all but won the match until he chanced a lazy second run; his score of 86 is the second highest for any Indian debutant in a limited overs match. With this win, India extended its world record of successive wins while batting second to 16.
