= 2007–08 NKP Salve Challenger Trophy =

NKP Salve Challenger Trophy 2007/08
- Date: 25 – 28 October 2007
- Location: Ahmedabad, Gujarat, India
- Result: Won by India Blue
- Player of the series: Suresh Raina (India Blue)
Teams
| India Blue | India Red | India Green |
Captains
| (India) Virender Sehwag | (India) Subramaniam Badrinath | (India) Parthiv Patel |
Most runs
| Suresh Raina (206) | Subramaniam Badrinath (178) | Manoj Tiwary (81) |
Most wickets
| Amit Mishra (8) | Praveen Kumar (9) | Iqbal Abdulla (4) |

The 13th NKP Salve Challenger Trophy was an Indian domestic cricket tournament that was held in Ahmedabad from 25 October to 28 October 2007. The series involved the domestic teams from India which were India Blue, India Red, and India Green. India Blue defeated India Red by 6 wickets in the final to become the champions of the tournament.

== Squads ==
| India Blue | India Red | India Green |
|---|---|---|
| Virender Sehwag (c); Ajinkya Rahane; Dinesh Karthik (wk); Suresh Raina; Niraj Patel; Arjun Yadav; Joginder Sharma; Ramesh Powar; Amit Mishra; Yo Mahesh; Ranadeb Bose; Swapnil Asnodkar; Rakesh Dhruv; Saurabh Bandekar | Mohammad Kaif (c); Gautam Gambhir; Karan Goel; Subramaniam Badrinath; Virat Kohli; Ravneet Ricky; Praveen Kumar; Mahesh Rawat (wk); Pragyan Ojha; Siddharth Trivedi; Ishant Sharma; Pinal Shah (wk); Shrikant Mundhe; Paresh Patel | Parthiv Patel (c & wk); Cheteshwar Pujara; Rohit Sharma; Piyush Chawla; Manoj Tiwary; Yusuf Pathan; Abhishek Nayar; Niranjan Behera; Piyush Chawla; Iqbal Abdulla; Pankaj Singh; Munaf Patel; Gagandeep Singh; Srikkanth Anirudha; Satyajit Satbhai; ~~Murali Kartik~~ |

- Piyush Chawla replaced Murali Kartik in the India Green squad, after he was given rest by the selectors.

== Points Table ==
| Pos | Team | Pld | W | L | NR | Pts | NRR |
|---|---|---|---|---|---|---|---|
| 1 | India Blue | 2 | 2 | 0 | 0 | 8 | 0.397 |
| 2 | India Red | 2 | 1 | 1 | 0 | 4 | 0.617 |
| 3 | India Green | 2 | 0 | 2 | 0 | 0 | −1.001 |

Source: 'Points Table'

== Matches ==
=== Group stage ===
25 October 2007

| India Blue; 246 (50 overs) | v | India Red; 234/8 (50 overs) |
| Suresh Raina 92 (100); Praveen Kumar 4/42 (10 overs) | | Mahesh Rawat 47 (64); Joginder Sharma 3/30 (10 overs) |

India Blue won by 12 runs.
Sardar Patel Stadium, Motera, Ahmedabad
Umpires: Arani Jayaprakash (IND) and AY Gokhale (IND)
Player of the match: Suresh Raina (India Blue)

- India Blue won the toss and elected to bat.
- Points: India Blue 4, India Red 0

26 October 2007

| India Red; 303/7 (50 overs) | v | India Green; 215 (47 overs) |
| Subramaniam Badrinath 82* (79); Pankaj Singh 2/37 (8 overs) | | Manoj Tiwary 65 (71); Praveen Kumar 5/45 (9 overs) |

India Red won by 88 runs.
Sardar Patel Stadium, Motera, Ahmedabad
Umpires: Sameer Bandekar (IND) and Shashank Ranade (IND)
Player of the match: Subramaniam Badrinath (India Red)

- India Red won the toss and elected to bat.
- Points: India Red 4, India Green 0

25 October 2008

| India Blue; 330/8 (50 overs) | v | India Green; 239 (38.2 overs) |
| Virender Sehwag 75 (57); Piyush Chawla 2/60 (10 overs) | | Parthiv Patel 53 (50); Ramesh Powar 3/45 (10 overs) |

India Blue won by 91 runs.
Sardar Patel Stadium, Motera, Ahmedabad
Umpires: Arani Jayaprakash (IND) and Sameer Bandekar (IND)
Player of the match: Virender Sehwag (India Blue)

- India Blue won the toss and elected to bat.
- Points: India Blue 4, India Green 0

== Final ==
26 October 2008

| India Red; 269 (49.3 overs) | v | India Blue; 270/4 (41 overs) |
| Gautam Gambhir 82 (77); Amit Mishra 3/45 (10 overs) | | Dinesh Karthik 116* (91); Shrikant Mundhe 1/34 (5 overs) |

India Blue won by 6 wickets.
Sardar Patel Stadium, Motera, Ahmedabad
Umpires: Arani Jayaprakash (IND) and Sameer Bandekar (IND)
Player of the match: Dinesh Karthik (India Blue)

- India Red won the toss and elected to bat.
- India Blue became the winners of the NKP Salve Challenger Trophy 2007/08.
