= 2011–12 NKP Salve Challenger Trophy =

NKP Salve Challenger Trophy 2011/12
- Date: 10 – 13 October 2011
- Location: Nagpur, Maharashtra, India
- Result: India Green and India Red as joint winners.
Teams
India Blue	India Red	India Green
Captains
(India) Subramaniam Badrinath	(India) Gautam Gambhir	(India) Harbhajan Singh
Most runs
Manish Pandey (77)	Abhinav Mukund (225)	Robin Uthappa (195)
Most wickets
Pradeep Sangwan (7)	Yusuf Pathan (5)	Abhimanyu Mithun (6)

The 17th NKP Salve Challenger Trophy was an Indian domestic cricket tournament that was held in Nagpur from 10 October to 13 October 2011. The series involved the domestic teams from India which were India Blue, India Red, and India Green. India Red and India Green were declared as joint winners, after the final ended in a tie.

== Squads ==
India Blue	India Red	India Green
Subramaniam Badrinath (c); Dinesh Karthik (wk); Murali Vijay; Paul Valthaty; Manish Pandey; Mandeep Singh; Saurabh Tiwary; Irfan Pathan; Amit Mishra; Pragyan Ojha; Yaju Krishanatry; Prashant Parameshwaran; Pradeep Sangwan; Tanmay Srivastava	Gautam Gambhir (c); Shikhar Dhawan; Abhinav Mukund; Ambati Rayudu; Ashok Menaria; Wriddhiman Saha (wk); Jalaj Saxena; Piyush Chawla; Bhargav Bhatt; Pankaj Singh; Jaydev Unadkat; TP Sudhindra; Yusuf Pathan; RP Singh	Harbhajan Singh (c); Robin Uthappa; Srikkanth Anirudha; Tirumalasetti Suman; Mohnish Mishra; Ishank Jaggi; Mohammad Kaif; CM Gautham (wk); Sarabjit Ladda; Iqbal Abdulla; Abhimanyu Mithun; Samad Fallah; Ishwar Chaudhary; Sumit Narwal

== Points Table ==
Pos	Team	Pld	W	L	NR	Pts	NRR
1	India Red	2	2	0	0	8	0.962
2	India Green	2	1	1	0	4	0.095
3	India Blue	2	0	2	0	0	−0.960

Source: 'Points Table'

== Matches ==
=== Group stage ===
10 October 2011

India Blue; 274/8 (50 overs)	v	India Red; 275/5 (47.3 overs)
Subramaniam Badrinath 56 (80); Bhargav Bhatt 2/48 (10 overs)		Abhinav Mukund 127 (133); Pradeep Sangwan 3/61 (9 overs)

India Red won by 5 wickets.
Vidarbha Cricket Association Stadium, Nagpur
Umpires: Chettithody Shamshuddin (IND) and C. K. Nandan (IND)
Player of the match: Abhinav Mukund (India Red)

- India Red won the toss and elected to field.
- Points: India Red 4, India Blue 0

11 October 2011

India Green; 170 (40.3 overs)	v	India Red; 152/2 (29 overs)
Robin Uthappa 56 (47); Yusuf Pathan 4/25 (8 overs)		Abhinav Mukund 61 (70); Ishwar Chaudhary 1/21 (6 overs)

India Red won by 8 wickets (VJD method).
Vidarbha Cricket Association Stadium, Nagpur
Umpires: Chettithody Shamshuddin (IND) and Vineet Kulkarni (IND)
Player of the match: Abhinav Mukund (India Red)

- India Red won the toss and elected to bat.
- Points: India Red 4, India Green 0

12 October 2011

India Green; 348/9 (50 overs)	v	India Blue; 269 (41.4 overs)
Robin Uthappa 132 (103); Pradeep Sangwan 4/58 (10 overs)		Saurabh Tiwary 74 (70); Samad Fallah 3/59 (8 overs)

India Green won by 79 runs.
Vidarbha Cricket Association Stadium, Nagpur
Umpires: Sundaram Ravi (IND) and Vineet Kulkarni (IND)
Player of the match: Robin Uthappa (India Green)

- India Blue won the toss and elected to field.
- Points: India Green 4, India Blue 0

== Final ==
13 October 2011

India Green; 238/8 (50 overs)	v	India Red; 238 (49.4 overs)
Harbhajan Singh 49* (54); Pankaj Singh 2/44 (10 overs)		Piyush Chawla 92 (85); Iqbal Abdulla 3/37 (10 overs); Harbhajan Singh 3/37 (10 overs)

Match Tied.
Vidarbha Cricket Association Stadium, Nagpur
Umpires: C. K. Nandan (IND) and Sundaram Ravi (IND)

- India Red won the toss and elected to field.
- The trophy was jointly shared by India Red and India Green after the match ended in tie.
