= 2013–14 NKP Salve Challenger Trophy =

NKP Salve Challenger Trophy 2013/14
- Date: 25th – 28 September 2013
- Location: Indore, Madhya Pradesh, India
- Result: Won by India Blue
Teams
India Blue	India Red	Delhi
Captains
(India) Yuvraj Singh	(India) Yusuf Pathan	(India) Virat Kohli
Most runs
Abhishek Nayar (178)	Abhinav Mukund (147)	Unmukt Chand (138)
Most wickets
Bhuvneshwar Kumar (8) Vinay Kumar (8)	Abhimanyu Mithun (4)	Rajat Bhatia (7)

The 19th NKP Salve Challenger Trophy was a domestic cricket tournament that was held in Indore from 25 September to 28 September 2013. The series involved the domestic teams from India which were India Blue, India Red, and Delhi. The tournament was won by India Blue who defeated Delhi by 50 runs.

This tournament marked the last edition of the NKP Salve Challenger Trophy, after BCCI scrapped the tournament while restructuring their calendar for domestic tournaments for the later upcoming seasons.

== Squads ==
India Blue	India Red	(India) Delhi
Yuvraj Singh (c); Ankit Bawne; Piyush Chawla; Bhuvneshwar Kumar; Abhishek Nayar; Naman Ojha (wk); Manish Pandey; Ankit Rajpoot; Akshath Reddy; Sibsankar Roy; Iresh Saxena; Vinay Kumar; ~~Mandeep Singh~~	Yusuf Pathan (c); Ishank Jaggi; Kedar Jadhav; Gurkeerat Singh Mann; Abhimanyu Mithun; Abhinav Mukund; Shahbaz Nadeem; Smit Patel (wk); Sandeep Warrier; Robin Uthappa; Suraj Yadav; Umesh Yadav; ~~Irfan Pathan~~; ~~Saurabh Tiwary~~	Virat Kohli (c); Virender Sehwag; Gautam Gambhir; Ashish Nehra; Unmukt Chand; Jagrit Anand; Rajat Bhatia; Parvinder Awana; Punit Bisht (wk); Manan Sharma; Mithun Manhas; Milind Kumar; Mohit Sharma; Sumit Narwal; Pawan Suyal; Varun Sood

- Earlier, Irfan Pathan was chosen to lead India Red in the tournament, but after he along with Saurabh Tiwary got injured they were replaced by Sandeep Warrier and Ishank Jaggi respectively. Yusuf Pathan was chosen to lead the squad after Irfan Pathan was ruled out.
- Mandeep Singh was replaced by Sibsankar Roy for India Blue after he sustained a finger injury.

== Matches ==
=== Group stage ===
Pos	Team	Pld	W	L	NR	Pts	NRR
1	India Blue	2	2	0	0	8	0.290
2	(India) Delhi	2	1	1	0	4	0.940
3	India Red	2	0	2	0	0	−1.230

Source: 'Points Table'

25 September 2013

India Blue; 270/6 (50 overs)	v	(India) Delhi; 252 (47.5 overs)
Abhishek Nayar 91 (73); Rajat Bhatia 3/46 (10 overs)		Rajat Bhatia 65 (89); Ankit Rajpoot 3/44 (10 overs)

India Blue won by 18 runs
Holkar Stadium, Indore
Umpires: Krishnaraj Srinath (IND) and Suresh Shastri (IND)

- Delhi won the toss and elected to field.
- Points: India Blue 4, Delhi 0

26 September 2013

India Blue; 345/4 (50 overs)	v	India Red; 334 (49.5 overs)
Yuvraj Singh 84 (53); Abhimanyu Mithun 1/68 (11 overs)		Abhinav Mukund 83 (86); Vinay Kumar 4/76 (10.5 overs)

India Blue won by 11 runs.
Holkar Stadium, Indore
Umpires: Krishnaraj Srinath (IND) and Sanjay Hazare (IND)

- India Red won the toss and elected to field.
- Points: India Blue 4, India Red 0

27 September 2013

Delhi (India); 342/6 (50 overs)	v	India Red; 230 (40.1 overs)
Unmukt Chand 119 (131); Abhimanyu Mithun 3/81 (10 overs)		Gurkeerat Singh Mann 83 (51); Varun Sood 5/84 (12 overs)

Delhi won by 112 runs.
Holkar Stadium, Indore
Umpires: Vineet Kulkarni (IND) and Sanjay Hazare (IND)

- India Red won the toss and elected to field.
- Points: Delhi 4, India Red 0

=== Final ===
28 September 2013

India Blue; 274/9 (50 overs)	v	(India) Delhi; 224 (44.4 overs)
Manish Pandey 62 (78); Parvinder Awana 4/39 (8 overs)		Punit Bisht 54* (49); Bhuvneshwar Kumar 4/39 (10 overs)

India Blue won by 50 runs
Holkar Stadium, Indore
Umpires: Vineet Kulkarni (IND) and Suresh Shastri (IND)
Player of the match: Bhuvneshwar Kumar (India Blue)

- India Blue won the toss and elected to bat.
