= Avinash Vaidya =

Indian cricketer (born 1967)

Avinash Vasantrao Vaidya (born 24 January 1967 in Hubli) is a former Indian cricketer who played for Karnataka as a right-handed batsman wicket-keeper between 1992 and 1998.
