= NKP Salve Challenger Trophy =

Defunct cricket tournament

- Countries: India
- Administrator: BCCI
- Format: List A cricket
- First edition: 1994–95
- Latest edition: 2013–14
- Tournament format: Knock out
- Number of teams: 3
- Current champion: India Blue
- Website: BCCI

The NKP Salve Challenger Trophy, commonly referred to as the Challenger Series, was an Indian List A cricket tournament organized by the Board of Control for Cricket in India (BCCI). Established in the 1994–1995 season, the tournament was played to showcase the country's talent and provide opportunities for younger players to make an impression. The tournament was played in October every year until the 2013–14 season before Ranji Trophy season.

From 1998 to 1999, the tournament was known as the NKP Salve Challenger Trophy, named after former Board of Control for Cricket in India president Narendra Kumar Prasadrao Salve – the man who brought the World Cup to the sub-continent in 1987. The tournament was not played in 2002–03.

The annual tournament is played between three sides, consisting of 36 of the best players in India. The three teams were India Seniors, India A, and India B. Team names were changed for the 2006 version of this tournament. India Seniors became India Blue, India A became India Red, and India B became India Green. India Seniors has won 7 times, including the 2005–06 edition.

== Winners ==
Year	Winner
1994–95	India Seniors
1995–96	India Seniors
1996–97	India Seniors
1997–98	India Seniors
1998–99	India A/India B
1999–00	India Seniors
2000–01	India Seniors
2001–02	India A
2002–03	Not played
2003–04	India A
2004–05	India A
2005–06	India Seniors
2006–07	India Blue/India Red
2007–08	India Blue
2008–09	India Blue
2009–10	India Red
2010–11	India Blue
2011–12	India Red/India Green
2012–13	India B
2013–14	India Blue

== See also ==
- Cricket in India
- Deodhar Trophy
- Vijay Hazare Trophy
