= Rakesh Patel =

Indian cricketer (born 1978)

Rakesh Bhanuprasad Patel (born 3 October 1978 in Ahmedabad, Gujarat, India), is an Indian cricketer who plays for the Ahmedabad Rockets in the Indian Cricket League.

Patel, primarily a right-arm fast-medium bowler, played 66 first-class matches for Gujarat and Baroda before signing for the ICL, where he first played for the Mumbai Champs before moving to the newly formed Rockets team.

He scored six half-centuries at first-class level and took 234 wickets.

In 2026, it was discovered he has been selected as a Committee Member for BCCI Junior Cricket Committee.
