= Pieter Strydom =

South African cricketer (born 1969)

Personal information
- Born: 10 June 1969 (age 57); Somerset East, Cape Province, South Africa
- Batting: Right-handed
- Bowling: Slow left-arm orthodox

International information
- National side: South Africa
- Test debut (cap 40): 14 January 2000 v England
- Last Test: 24 February 2000 v India
- ODI debut (cap 57): 28 January 2000 v Zimbabwe
- Last ODI: 28 March 2000 v Pakistan

Career statistics
Competition	Test	ODI
Matches	2	10
Runs scored	35	48
Batting average	11.66	9.59
100s/50s	0/0	0/0
Top score	30	34
Balls bowled	36	252
Wickets	0	2
Bowling average	–	103.00
5 wickets in innings	–	0
10 wickets in match	–	0
Best bowling	–	1/18
Catches/stumpings	1/–	3/–
- Source: Cricinfo, 25 January 2006

Pieter Coenraad Strydom (born 10 June 1969) is a former cricketer. He played two Test matches and ten One Day Internationals for South Africa in 2000 until he was caught up in the South Africa cricket match fixing, but he was acquitted of those charges.

In February 2020, he was named in South Africa's squad for the Over-50s Cricket World Cup in South Africa. However, the tournament was cancelled during the third round of matches due to the coronavirus pandemic.
