= Iqbal Abdulla =

Indian cricketer (born 1989)

Personal information
- Full name: Sayed Iqbal Abdullah
- Born: 2 December 1989 (age 36); Azamgarh, Uttar Pradesh, India
- Batting: Left-handed
- Bowling: Slow left-arm orthodox
- Role: Bowler

Domestic team information
- Years: Team
- 2007–2015: Mumbai
- 2008–2013: Kolkata Knight Riders (squad no. 21)
- 2014: Rajasthan Royals
- 2015–2017: Royal Challengers Bangalore (squad no. 21)
- 2016–2017: Kerala
- 2017: Mumbai
- 2021–2022: Mizoram

Career statistics
| Competition | FC | LA | T20 |
|---|---|---|---|
| Matches | 71 | 98 | 104 |
| Runs scored | 2,641 | 1,196 | 426 |
| Batting average | 32.20 | 20.98 | 17/04 |
| 100s/50s | 3/13 | 0/4 | 0/0 |
| Top score | 159* | 60 | 46* |
| Balls bowled | 13,984 | 5,008 | 2,055 |
| Wickets | 220 | 131 | 86 |
| Bowling average | 29.17 | 27.47 | 27.33 |
| 5 wickets in innings | 7 | 2 | 1 |
| 10 wickets in match | 1 | 0 | 0 |
| Best bowling | 6/42 | 6/32 | 5/10 |
| Catches/stumpings | 46/– | 32/– | 33/– |
- Source: ESPNcricinfo, 17 January 2025

Sayed Iqbal Abdulla (born 2 December 1989) is an Indian cricketer who bowls orthodox spin and is a left-handed lower order batsmen. He plays for Mumbai in the Ranji Trophy, and used to play for the Royal Challengers Bangalore in the Indian Premier League.

The major teams he has played in are: India A, India Green in the Challenger Trophy, India Under-19 cricket team, Kolkata Knight Riders, Royal Challengers Bangalore, Mumbai cricket team and Kerala cricket team.

== Under-19s career ==
A regular performer on the Mumbai club circuit, Abdulla came into the limelight when he ran through Haryana's batting line-up with a five-for in a Twenty20 game. He was soon drafted into the Indian Under-19 team for a tri-series in Sri Lanka, where he was the third-highest wicket-taker with eight wickets for 69 runs in 31.1 overs. His ten wickets at 13 apiece played an important role in India U-19s winning the World Cup in Malaysia in 2008. Abdulla was Mumbai's leading wicket-taker in the 2010–11 season, having taken a total of 27 wickets at an average of 22.11. He is a talented lower middle order batsman and an authentic fielder.

== Domestic career ==
In the 2011 IPL, Abdulla won two "Man of the Match" awards for his side, and also picked up the "Rising Star" award. He also won the man of the series for India A during the Emerging Players Tournament in Australia 2011. In 2012 Abdulla won the Indian Premier League for the first time in 5 years with his team Kolkata Knight Riders. Since 2014 he has been playing for Royal Challengers Bangalore.

In 2016, Abdulla changed sides from Mumbai to Kerala in the 2016–2017 edition of the Ranji Trophy.
