= M. R. Singh =

Indian cricket umpire (born 1954)

Personal information
- Born: 31 July 1954 (age 72)

Umpiring information
- ODIs umpired: 6 (1993–2000)
- WTests umpired: 1 (1984)
- WODIs umpired: 2 (1997–2003)
- Source: ESPNcricinfo, 30 May 2014

M. R. Singh (born 31 July 1954) is a former Indian cricket umpire. He stood in six ODI games from 1993 to 2000.

== See also ==
- List of One Day International cricket umpires
