= Nikhil Haldipur =

Indian cricketer (born 1977)

Nikhil Haldipur (born 19 December 1977) is an Indian first class cricketer. He is a left-handed batsman and represented West Bengal, India B, India A, Rest of India, East Zone and Goa.

In the year 1998 he won the Castrol Most Promising Cricketer Award along with Amit Pagnis (Mumbai), Mohammed Kaif (Uttar Pradesh) and Reetinder Singh Sodhi (Punjab).

He studied at St. Lawrence High School, Kolkata. Nikhil Haldipur never made it to the Indian National Team despite being recognized as one of the best left-handed batsmen in the country. He was written about in the article named "The unsung heroes" by SPORTSSTAR Magazine, edition dated 27 Jan. 2007
