= K. Parthasarathy =

Indian cricket umpire (born 1943)

Personal information
- Born: 9 December 1943 (age 82)

Umpiring information
- Tests umpired: 2 (1994–1998)
- ODIs umpired: 10 (1993–2002)
- WODIs umpired: 1 (1997)
- Source: ESPNcricinfo, 14 July 2013

K. Parthasarathy (born 9 December 1943) is an Indian former cricket umpire.

The dozen international matches that Parthasarathy officiated in included two Test matches between 1994 and 1998 and ten ODI games between 1993 and 2002.

== See also ==
- List of Test cricket umpires
- List of One Day International cricket umpires
