= S. Choudhary =

Indian cricket umpire

Personal information
- Full name: S. Choudhary

Umpiring information
- ODIs umpired: 9 (1993–1999)
- Source: Cricinfo, 17 May 2014

S. Choudhary is an Indian former cricket umpire. In addition to umpiring at the first-class level, he stood in nine ODI games from 1993 to 1999.

== See also ==
- List of One Day International cricket umpires
