= Abhimanyu Mithun =

Indian cricketer

Personal information
- Born: 25 October 1989 (age 37); Bangalore, Karnataka, India
- Batting: Right-handed
- Bowling: Right-arm fast-medium
- Role: Bowling allrounder

International information
- National side: India (2010–2011)
- Test debut (cap 264): 18 July 2010 v Sri Lanka
- Last Test: 28 June 2011 v West Indies
- ODI debut (cap 180): 27 February 2010 v South Africa
- Last ODI: 11 December 2011 v West Indies
- ODI shirt no.: 25

Domestic team information
- Years: Team
- 2007/08–2020/21: Karnataka
- 2009–2013: Royal Challengers Bangalore

Career statistics
Competition	Test	ODI	FC	LA
Matches	4	5	103	96
Runs scored	120	51	1,937	564
Batting average	24.00	17.00	19.17	14.84
100s/50s	0/0	0/0	0/4	0/0
Top score	46	24	89	40*
Balls bowled	720	180	17,384	4,773
Wickets	9	3	338	136
Bowling average	50.66	67.66	26.63	28.50
5 wickets in innings	0	0	12	2
10 wickets in match	0	0	2	0
Best bowling	4/105	2/32	6/36	5/37
Catches/stumpings	0/–	1/–	20/–	23/–
- Source: CricketArchive, 27 February 2025

Abhimanyu Mithun (born 25 October 1989) is an Indian former cricketer. A right-arm fast-medium bowler, Mithun was called up to the India squad for the first Test against South Africa in 2009–10, only ten weeks after making his first-class debut. He has also played in the IPL for Royal Challengers Bangalore. In November 2019, he became the first bowler to take a hat-trick in all three domestic formats of top-level cricket in India. In first class cricket, he played for Karnataka. He retired from all formats of the game in October 2021.

== Playing career ==
As a teenager, Mithun was a [Javelin] thrower, competing at state-level. Despite training at his father's gym throughout his teens, he failed to progress with his discus throwing, and a friend suggested that he join a cricket camp. Until the age of 17, he hadn't bowled with a leather ball.

Royal Challengers Bangalore's head coach Ray Jennings eulogised about him, describing him as an "express bowler", but he had a quiet IPL. His first-class debut reinvigorated the potential; he claimed six wickets in the first innings, followed by five wickets in the second, including a hat-trick. During the ensuing season, he displayed his credentials, claiming another five-wicket haul, and taking 47 wickets to finish as the highest wicket-taker in the 2009–10 Ranji Trophy.

His call-up to the India national cricket team to replace the injured Sreesanth came little more than ten weeks after his first-class debut, but his Karnataka coach Sanath Kumar was not surprised; "From day one we knew he had the potential, he has the pace, bowling around 140 km/h, and he has performed in every game, whether it is junior cricket or first-class cricket.

He made his debut in One Day Internationals in the third and final one day match against South Africa in the 2010 season. His Test debut was against Sri Lanka on 18 July 2010, at Galle, in which he claimed four wickets. He batted at No. 11 in the first innings, but after looking more solid than his fellow bowlers, he was promoted to No. 9 in the second innings and scored 25.

However, he was not provided further opportunities in the Indian squad. In the 2015 Indian Premiere League, it was announced that he would be playing for Mumbai Indians as a good death bowler.

In July 2018, he was named in the squad for India Red for the 2018–19 Duleep Trophy. In October 2019, in the final of the 2019–20 Vijay Hazare Trophy, he took a hat-trick, with Karnataka going on to win the match. In November 2019, in the first semi-final of the 2019–20 Syed Mushtaq Ali Trophy, between Haryana and Karnataka, he took five wickets in one over, including a hat-trick.

On 7 October 2021, Mithun retired from first-class cricket.

== Personal life ==
Abhimanyu Mithun married Rayane, the daughter of actress Radhika Sarathkumar on 28 August 2016. Their wedding was attended by the cricket and politics fraternity. They had a son on 7 June 2018 who they named Tarak and a girl on 18 March 2020, who they named Radhya derived from his wife's mother's name.
