= Aashish Kapoor =

Indian cricketer (born 1971)

Personal information
- Full name: Aashish Rakesh Kapoor
- Born: 25 March 1971 (age 55); Madras, Tamil Nadu, India
- Batting: Right-handed
- Bowling: Right-arm off-break

International information
- National side: India
- Test debut (cap 201): 10 December 1994 v West Indies
- Last Test: 8 December 1996 v South Africa
- ODI debut (cap 92): 22 February 1995 v Australia
- Last ODI: 14 December 2000 v Zimbabwe

Career statistics
Competition	Test	ODI	FC	LA
Matches	4	17	128	93
Runs scored	97	43	3,449	801
Batting average	19.39	7.16	24.63	14.56
100s/50s	0/0	0/0	3/19	0/1
Top score	42	19	181	57
Balls bowled	642	900	26,220	4,781
Wickets	6	8	398	86
Bowling average	42.50	76.50	31.93	35.39
5 wickets in innings	0	0	17	1
10 wickets in match	0	0	4	0
Best bowling	2/19	2/33	7/59	5/38
Catches/stumpings	1/–	1/–	82/–	15/–
Medal record
Men's Cricket
Representing India
ACC Asia Cup
Winner	1995 United Arab Emirates
- Source: ESPNcricinfo, 4 February 2006

Aashish Rakesh Kapoor (born 25 March 1971) is a former Indian cricketer who played in four Test matches and 17 One Day Internationals from 1994 to 2000. A right-arm off spinner and right-handed lower-order batsman, he was a member of the 1996 Cricket World Cup squad. He was a part of the Indian squad which won the 1995 Asia Cup.

Kapoor began his playing career at the St Mary's School and Santhome HSS in Chennai. In the TNCA schools tournament in 1987–88, he scored four hundreds in a row, including a 116 before lunch against Padma Seshadri. This won him the Best Schoolboy Cricketer award from TNCA and later the JC Mukherjee award for the best U-17 cricketer. For South Zone in the Vijay Hazare Trophy, Kapoor scored 103 & 58* against Central Zone and 130 against the North. He then started playing for SPIC in the senior league.

In December 1988 in the Under-19 Ghulam Ahmed trophy (South Zone of the Cooch Behar Trophy), Kapoor scored 304 (420 minutes, 354 balls, 24 fours and a six) against Goa. He added 408 for the first wicket with J. Ramdas. He also coached for Bahrain International Cricket Team (Mens and U19). In 2022, he was named assistant coach of Gujarat Titans in the Indian Premier League.
