= Tej Handu =

Indian cricket umpire

Personal information
- Full name: Tej Handu

Umpiring information
- ODIs umpired: 1 (1994)
- Source: Cricinfo, 18 May 2014

Tej K Handu is a former Indian cricket umpire. At the international level, the only match Handu officiated in was a One Day Intentional in 1994.

== See also ==
- List of One Day International cricket umpires
