= Sanjay Raul =

Indian cricketer (born 1976)

Personal information
- Full name: Sanjay Susanta Raul
- Born: 6 October 1976 (age 50); Cuttack, Odisha
- Batting: Right-handed
- Bowling: Right-arm offbreak

International information
- National side: India
- ODI debut (cap 118): 13 September 1998 v Pakistan
- Last ODI: 20 September 1998 v Pakistan

Career statistics
Competition	ODIs
Matches	2
Runs scored	8
Batting average	4.00
100s/50s	0/0
Top score	8
Balls bowled	36
Wickets	1
Bowling average	27.00
5 wickets in innings	0
10 wickets in match	0
Best bowling	1/13
Catches/stumpings	0/–
- Source: Cricinfo, 14 July 2021

Sanjay Raul (born 6 October 1976) is an Indian cricketer. He is a right-handed batsman and a right-arm offbreak bowler.

Sanjay Raul is a strokeful middle order batsman who started his international debut as part of India 'A' tour of Pakistan in early 1998. He played both of his ODIs against Pakistan at Skating & Curling Club, Toronto in 1998, but failed to perform well in the two matches. His best domestic season was in 1996/97, when he made 644 runs and took 37 wickets, and topped the batting and bowling averages for Odisha. Now he is a professional match referee on OCA. He has also played domestic cricket for Tripura. He was the Captain of India national under-19 cricket team in the year 1995/96. He was also the Captain of Odisha cricket team.
