= Rahul Sanghvi =

Indian cricketer (born 1974)

Personal information
- Born: 3 September 1974 (age 52); Delhi, India
- Batting: Left-handed
- Bowling: Slow left-arm orthodox

Career statistics
Competition	Test	ODI
Matches	1	10
Runs scored	2	8
Batting average	1.00	4.00
100s/50s	0/0	0/0
Top score	2	8
Balls bowled	74	498
Wickets	2	10
Bowling average	39.00	39.89
5 wickets in innings	0	0
10 wickets in match	0	0
Best bowling	2/67	3/29
Catches/stumpings	0/–	4/–
- Source: Cricinfo, 4 February 2006

Rahul Sanghvi (born 3 September 1974) is an Indian cricketer, specialising in left arm orthodox spin. He played for the Delhi state team. He played one Test match, which was the first Test between Australia and India in 2001 but was dropped after Australia claimed a 10 wicket victory. He played in 10 One Day Internationals. He has played first-class cricket for three teams: Delhi, North Zone and Railways.Currently Rahul is with IPL Franchise Mumbai Indians where he is managing the team and scouting of players since the inception of IPL in 2008. Rahul is also looking after MI Capetown, MI Emirates, MI Women's team and MI Newyork Teams as well. Much of the success of MI's talent scouting goes to Rahul's sharp and intelligent cricketing mind as he can scout talent with ease.

In 1997–98 he set a world record when he took 8–15 for Delhi against Himachal Pradesh in a Ranji Trophy One Day match which later in 2019 Shahbaz Nadeem broke, a two-decade-old world record for best bowling figures in List A cricket, with a haul of 8/10 against Rajasthan. In 2016 he was found violating the conflict of interest for performing his existing role at IPL while being a DDCA selector.
