= Rajesh Chauhan =

Indian cricketer (born 1966)

Personal information
- Full name: Rajesh Kumar Chauhan
- Born: 19 December 1966 (age 59); Ranchi, Bihar, (now Ranchi, Jharkhand), India
- Batting: Right-handed
- Bowling: Right-arm off-break

International information
- National side: India
- Test debut (cap 197): 29 January 1993 v England
- Last Test: 18 March 1998 v Australia
- ODI debut (cap 87): 25 July 1993 v Sri Lanka
- Last ODI: 28 December 1997 v Sri Lanka

Career statistics
Competition	Tests	ODIs
Matches	21	35
Runs scored	98	132
Batting average	7.00	10.15
100s/50s	0/0	0/0
Top score	23	32
Balls bowled	4,749	1,634
Wickets	47	29
Bowling average	39.51	41.93
5 wickets in innings	0	0
10 wickets in match	0	n/a
Best bowling	4/48	3/29
Catches/stumpings	12/–	10/–
- Source: CricInfo, 4 February 2006

Rajesh Chauhan (born 19 December 1966) is a former Indian cricketer who played in 21 Tests and 35 One Day Internationals from 1993 to 1998. He was part of the Indian spin trio of Kumble-Raju-Chauhan, in the 1990s.

Although his own contributions were only of limited value, India lost none of the 21 Tests in which he played. The feat for which he is perhaps remembered most is his last-over six off Saqlain Mushtaq at Karachi in 1997, which sealed a four-wicket win for India against Pakistan.

== Early life ==
His father Govind Raja Chauhan, who lived in Ranchi, was also a cricketer and played Ranji Trophy in 1957 & Duleep Trophy in 1964. Their ancestral village is Vidi in Kutch and he belongs to a small community known as Kutch Gurjar Kshatriya. Chauhan also served as Chairman of All-India Youth Wing of Kutch Gurjar Kshatriya community for years 1993–96 and is an active social member of the community.

== Later life ==
In April 2007 he was seriously injured in a car accident. He suffered multiple fractures as well as bruising on his leg, back, hand and head.

He currently resides in Bhilai, Chhattisgarh and is employed with Bhilai Steel Plant. He also runs his business.

On 7 July 2014, he suffered a massive cardiac arrest at his residence in Bhilai but survived.
