= Suresh Shastri =

Indian cricket umpire (born 1955)

Personal information
- Full name: Suresh Lalchand Shastri
- Born: 15 September 1955 (age 71); Jodhpur, Rajasthan, India
- Batting: Right-handed
- Bowling: Slow left-arm orthodox

Domestic team information
- Years: Team
- 1972–1987: Rajasthan
- 1974–1979: Central Zone
- FC debut: 16 December 1972 Rajasthan v Madhya Pradesh
- Last FC: 31 January 1987 Rajasthan v Bengal
- LA debut: 5 March 1978 Indian Board President's XI v Gujarat
- Last LA: 1 October 1980 Rajasthan v Bombay

Umpiring information
- Tests umpired: 2 (2007)
- ODIs umpired: 19 (1993–2008)
- T20Is umpired: 1 (2007)
- WODIs umpired: 3 (2003–2010)
- FC umpired: 83 (1990–2011)
- LA umpired: 70 (1993–2012)

Career statistics
Competition	First-class	List A
Matches	53	8
Runs scored	968	9
Batting average	18.98	9.00
100s/50s	1/5	0/0
Top score	103	3not out
Balls bowled	10,352	523
Wickets	155	12
Bowling average	26.36	25.00
5 wickets in innings	8	0
10 wickets in match	2	0
Best bowling	7/94	2/18
Catches/stumpings	25/–	1/–
- Source: CricketArchive, 1 July 2012

Suresh Lalchand Shastri (born 15 September 1955) is an Indian former cricketer and cricket umpire. He has stood in two Test matches and 19 One Day Internationals from 1993 to 2008.

== See also ==
- List of Test cricket umpires
- List of One Day International cricket umpires
- List of Twenty20 International cricket umpires
