= S. K. Bansal =

Indian cricket umpire (born 1940)

Personal information
- Full name: Shyam Kumar Bansal
- Born: 7 July 1940 (age 86); Delhi, India

Umpiring information
- Tests umpired: 6 (1993–2001)
- ODIs umpired: 30 (1990–2000)
- WTests umpired: 1 (2002)
- WODIs umpired: 2 (1995–1997)
- Source: Cricinfo profile, 19 January 2010

Shyam Kumar Bansal (born 7 July 1940) is an Indian former international cricket umpire. Besides umpiring in domestic matches, he officiated in six Test matches and 30 One Day Internationals from 1993 to 2001. He also umpired in one women's Test match, and two women's ODIs.

== See also ==
- List of Test cricket umpires
- List of One Day International cricket umpires
