= Nikhil Chopra =

Indian cricketer (born 1973)

Personal information
- Born: 26 December 1973 (age 52); Allahabad (now Prayagraj), Uttar Pradesh, India
- Batting: Right-handed
- Bowling: Right-arm off break

International information
- National side: India (1998–2000)
- Only Test (cap 227): 2 March 2000 v South Africa
- ODI debut (cap 116): 28 May 1998 v Kenya
- Last ODI: 1 June 2000 v Sri Lanka

Domestic team information
- Years: Team
- 1993/94–2000/01: Delhi
- 2001/02–2003/04: Uttar Pradesh

Career statistics
Competition	Test	ODI	FC	LA
Matches	1	39	61	88
Runs scored	7	310	1,940	760
Batting average	3.50	15.50	27.71	17.27
100s/50s	0/0	0/1	1/11	0/2
Top score	4	61	132*	61
Balls bowled	144	1,835	12,604	4,424
Wickets	0	46	151	101
Bowling average	–	27.95	35.00	30.71
5 wickets in innings	–	1	7	2
10 wickets in match	–	0	0	0
Best bowling	–	5/21	7/66	5/10
Catches/stumpings	0/–	16/–	29/–	37/–
- Source: ESPNcricinfo, 25 April 2023

Nikhil Chopra (born 19 August 1973) is a retired Indian cricketer. He played as a right-handed batsman and a right-arm offbreak bowler. A One Day International (ODI) specialist, he was part of the Indian team at the 1999 Cricket World Cup. He played in 39 ODIs and a solitary Test match for India.

After retiring from cricket, Chopra became a television cricket analyst. He is a regular guest in Cricket Crazy, Timed Out and Cricket Extra programmes of the ESPN-Star. Presently he is working as a cricket expert for Aajtak, India Today and doing Hindi commentary in IPL.

== Cricket career ==
Considered as a one-day specialist, Nikhil Chopra, is a former Indian off-spinner who played one Test and 39 ODIs for India. He was part of the Indian squad for the 1999 World Cup in England. Apart from being a good limited-overs bowler, Chopra was also a good fit lower down the order with the bat.

He could play the role of a pinch-hitter or add a few quick runs towards the end of the innings. In 26 innings for India in ODIs, he garnered 310 runs at an average of 15.50, including the highest score of 61. Chopra was a very useful bowler who had good control over line and length. He had good variations, but couldn't quite make a mark in the longest format of the game.

In the only Test he played against South Africa in 2000, he bowled 24 overs for 78 runs and stayed wicketless. Chopra picked up 46 ODI wickets during his career. His best bowling figures came against the West Indies in 1999. In the third ODI in Toronto, he took 5/21 as West Indies were bowled out for just 137 in comparison to India's 225.

Chopra had an indifferent 1999/00 season. With just 10 wickets from his last 9 ODI innings, the selectors would have always found it hard to keep Chopra in the team. He was dropped from the national team after India lost their game against Sri Lanka in the 2000 Asia Cup.

He became a cricket commentator after retirement.
