= Rohan Gavaskar =

Indian cricketer (born 1976)

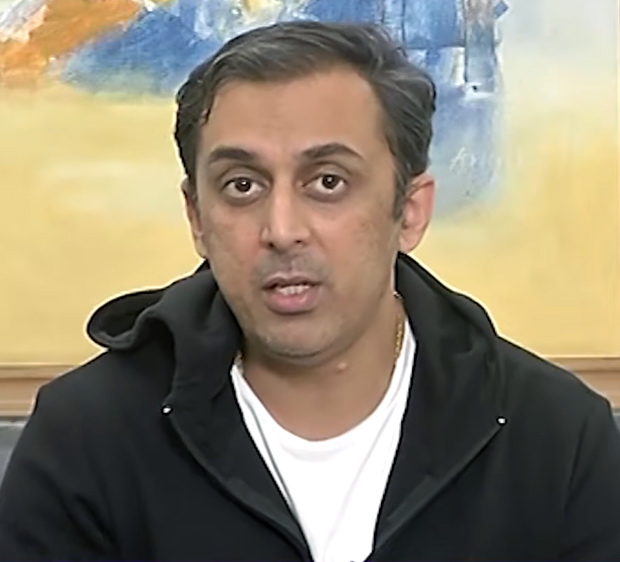
- Rohan Gavaskar in 2019

Personal information
- Full name: Rohan Sunil Gavaskar
- Born: 20 February 1976 (age 50); Kanpur, Uttar Pradesh, India
- Batting: Left-handed
- Bowling: Slow left-arm orthodox
- Role: Batsman
- Relatives: Sunil Gavaskar (father); Madhav Mantri (great-uncle); Gundappa Viswanath (uncle)

International information
- National side: India
- ODI debut (cap 154): 18 January 2004 v Australia
- Last ODI: 19 September 2004 v Pakistan

Domestic team information
- Years: Team
- 1996–2009: Bengal
- 2010: Kolkata Knight Riders

Career statistics
Competition	ODI	FC	LA	T20
Matches	11	117	126	10
Runs scored	151	6,938	3,156	113
Batting average	18.87	44.19	30.94	16.14
100s/50s	0/1	18/34	1/18	0/0
Top score	54	212*	101*	47
Balls bowled	72	3,890	2,492	87
Wickets	1	38	58	3
Bowling average	74.00	50.31	33.55	37.33
5 wickets in innings	0	1	1	0
10 wickets in match	0	0	0	0
Best bowling	1/56	5/3	5/35	1/16
Catches/stumpings	5/–	63/–	43/–	1/–
- Source: ESPNcricinfo, 9 February 2012

Rohan Sunil Gavaskar (born 20 February 1976) is a former Indian cricketer.

He played in 11 One Day Internationals. He was a middle-order left-handed batsman and an occasional slow left arm orthodox bowler. Rohan is the son of Indian cricketer Sunil Gavaskar.

== Domestic career ==
Gavaskar batted left-handed, and bowled slow left-arm spin.

In Indian domestic cricket, he represented Bengal in the Ranji Trophy, and East Zone in the Duleep Trophy. Since Mumbai had great batting line-up at that time and he wouldn't have got the opportunity to play first-class cricket for Mumbai immediately. He would have to wait for another one or two years, which he didn't want to. Bengal gave him that opportunity and he grabbed it.

His first-class average keeps him forever on the fringes of higher honours, and he was a serious contender for a national one-day slot for quite a while before he finally got his chance, against Australia in the 2003–04 VB Series.

He was dropped for the subsequent tour to Pakistan, he was again tried at the start of the 2004–05 season. Appointed captain of Bengal in 2001–02 but the two seasons as leader were poor. He was having regret for not winning the Ranji Trophy for Bengal. They were twice in the finals in consecutive years, but couldn't win it.

In 2007, Gavaskar signed a contract with Indian Cricket League, playing for the Kolkata Tigers which was declared unauthorised by BCCI. After breaking his links with the league, and returning to mainstream Indian domestic cricket, he was selected to play in the third season of the Indian Premier League for the Kolkata Knight Riders. He played in his last first class match in 2009 and retired in 2012.

He was one among the 71 players granted amnesty by the BCCI in June 2009, marking his return to the official fold.

Gavaskar announced his retirement from first-class cricket on 9 February 2012. Rohan, who played his first-class cricket for Bengal, scored 5073 runs in 75 matches at 51.24.

== International career ==
Gavaskar was selected for the Indian cricket team to tour Australia in 2004, and made his ODI debut after Mohammad Kaif was forced out of the team due to injury. He did not make a lasting impression on the international game, and his last ODI came during the 2004 ICC Champions Trophy.

== Media career ==
Like his father, Rohan followed commentating career post-retirement. He has been seen on doing commentary in IPL 2013 and shows on Star Sports' Star Power and NDTV's sports show.

== Personal life ==
He was given the names Rohan Jaivishwa by his father as a tribute to his 3 favourite cricketers – Rohan Kanhai; M. L. Jaisimha; and Rohan's uncle, Gundappa Vishwanath – although his name is usually recorded as Rohan Sunil Gavaskar. He studied at St. Xaviers Collegiate School, Kolkata, Bombay Scottish School, and then Ramniranjan Anandilal Podar College of Commerce and Economics.

Rohan is married to Swati Mankar.
