= Debashish Mohanty =

Indian cricketer (born 1976)

Debasish Mohanty
Personal information
- Full name: Debasish Sarbeswar Mohanty
- Born: 20 July 1976 (age 50); Bhubaneswar, Odisha, India
- Height: 6 ft 1 in (185 cm)
- Batting: Right-handed
- Bowling: Right-arm fast-medium
- Role: Bowler

International information
- National side: India (1997–2001)
- Test debut (cap 213): 9 August 1997 v Sri Lanka
- Last Test: 19 November 1997 v Sri Lanka
- ODI debut (cap 107): 13 September 1997 v Pakistan
- Last ODI: 22 July 2001 v Sri Lanka

Domestic team information
- Years: Team
- 1996–2010: Odisha

Career statistics
Competition	Test	ODI	FC	LA
Matches	2	45	117	129
Runs scored	–	28	1,553	218
Batting average	–	5.59	13.62	7.26
100s/50s	–	0/0	0/5	0/0
Top score	–	18*	97	22
Balls bowled	430	1,996	22,053	6,024
Wickets	4	57	417	160
Bowling average	59.75	29.15	21.05	26.84
5 wickets in innings	0	0	19	1
10 wickets in match	0	0	3	0
Best bowling	4/78	4/56	10/46	5/22
Catches/stumpings	0/–	10/–	47/–	26/–
- Source: ESPNcricinfo, 23 January 2019

Debasish (or Debasis) Sarbeswar Mohanty (born 20 July 1976) is a former Indian cricketer who played in two Test matches and 45 One Day Internationals between 1997 and 2001. He was a right-arm medium-fast bowler who coupled pace to his naturally lanky frame. He found success in the limited-overs format, averaging under 30 and taking over one wicket per game. On 24 December 2020, Mohanty was appointed as the national selector of the India national cricket team.

== International career ==
There was a period when Mohanty formed a strong new ball partnership with Venkatesh Prasad. Beginning at 1999 Cricket World Cup, he was the second highest Indian wicket taker despite playing four games fewer than the leading Indian wicket taker – Javagal Srinath. Mohanty played 17 ODIs and picked up 29 wickets at an average in the early 20s and climbed into the top 20 of the ICC ODI World Rankings. However, with the return of Ajit Agarkar, his opportunities dwindled and he played only another seven games. Mohanty, along with Harvinder Singh was instrumental in winning one of the Sahara Cup series against Pakistan in Toronto in the 1990s.

Mohanty was a potential pinch hitter but was never used by the Indian think tank. He was a very capable lower order batsman who could enthrall the crowd with his lusty blows. There was a brief period in Indian cricket when no 11 Mohanty along with no 10 Rahul Sanghvi entertained the crowd with monster sixes though in losing causes. His bowling action was more dangerous than the speed at which he delivered the ball. On flat pitches, he was advised to bowl off spin to save energy.

In the 2000–01 season, Mohanty took ten for 46 playing in a first-class match for East Zone v South Zone at Agartala, his career-best innings analysis, and so achieved the rare feat of taking all ten wickets in an innings.

== Coaching career ==
In 2006, he joined Colwyn Bay Cricket Club in Wales as the club professional. He is employed by NALCO, Bhubaneswar. He has been appointed the coach for Odisha Ranji team since 2011 and after 7 years he had been replaced by another former Indian cricketer Shiv Sundar Das as the Coach in 2017. He replaced the former coach Michael Bevan. He coached the East Zone team and East Zone created history by winning their first Duleep Trophy.
