= Dinesh Mongia =

Indian cricketer and politician

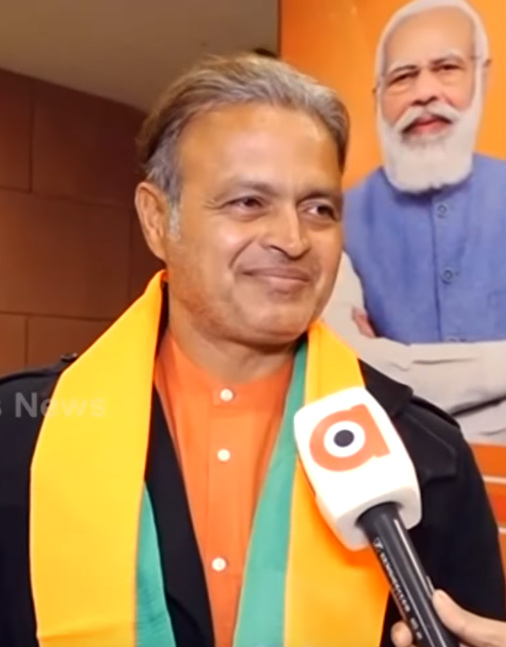

Personal information
- Born: 17 April 1977 (age 49); Chandigarh, India
- Height: 6 ft 0 in (183 cm)
- Batting: Left-handed
- Bowling: Slow left arm orthodox
- Role: Batsman

International information
- National side: India (2001–2007)
- ODI debut (cap 136): 28 March 2001 v Australia
- Last ODI: 12 May 2007 v Bangladesh
- ODI shirt no.: 28
- Only T20I (cap 6): 1 December 2006 v South Africa
- T20I shirt no.: 28

Career statistics
| Competition | ODI | T20I | FC | LA |
|---|---|---|---|---|
| Matches | 57 | 1 | 121 | 198 |
| Runs scored | 1,230 | 38 | 8,028 | 5,535 |
| Batting average | 27.95 | 38.00 | 48.95 | 35.25 |
| 100s/50s | 1/4 | 0/0 | 27/28 | 10/26 |
| Top score | 159* | 38 | 308* | 159* |
| Balls bowled | 571 | – | 4,037 | 3,834 |
| Wickets | 14 | – | 46 | 116 |
| Bowling average | 40.78 | – | 36.67 | 25.65 |
| 5 wickets in innings | 0 | – | 0 | 1 |
| 10 wickets in match | 0 | – | 0 | 0 |
| Best bowling | 3/31 | – | 4/34 | 5/44 |
| Catches/stumpings | 21/– | 1/– | 121/– | 85/– |
Medal record
Men's Cricket
Representing India
ICC Cricket World Cup
| Runner-up | 2003 South Africa-Zimbabwe-Kenya |
ICC Champions Trophy
| Winner | 2002 Sri Lanka |
- Source: ESPNcricinfo, 27 August 2017

Dinesh Mongia (born 17 April 1977) is a former Indian cricketer and politician. Mongia has appeared in limited over internationals for India. With India, Mongia was a member of the Indian team that was one of the joint-winners of the 2002 ICC Champions Trophy, which the title was also shared with Sri Lanka, and was a member of the team that were runners-up in the 2003 Cricket World Cup.

== Domestic career ==
Mongia in domestic cricket career scored 8,100 runs at an average of just under 50 and his highest score being an unbeaten 308.

In 2004, he signed for Lancashire as an overseas player when Stuart Law was injured. In 2005 he was signed by Leicestershire on a full-time contract.

Mongia plays for the Lashings World XI team. He also played for Chandigarh Lions in the now defunct Indian Cricket League.

== First Indian T20 cricketer ==
Mongia is the first Indian cricketer to play a T20 match, playing for Lancashire against Leicestershire in the 2004 Twenty20 Cup. He played for Lancashire in the 2004 County Championship.

== International career ==
He made his ODI debut in 2001 against Australia without much success. However, in his fifth match, he scored his first half-century (71 off 75 balls) against England. In 2002, almost a year after his debut, he picked up his first and only century (an unbeaten 159 off just 147 balls against Zimbabwe) to win the Man of the Match award. He was also named the Man of the Series in that tour. Suspicions remained, however, that kinks in his technique could be exposed on more challenging tracks abroad, and indifferent displays in England resulted in him being relegated to a bit-part role in the tours that followed.

He forced his way back into the 2003 Cricket World Cup squad, where India lost the final against Australia. But after a string of below-par performances, he was dropped from the Indian side in April 2005.

He was again selected in the Indian team in 2006 for the Tri-Series in Sri Lanka. However, the tournament was affected by the pull out of the third team, South Africa, due to a bomb explosion in Colombo, and by incessant rain. Instead, Mongia got an opportunity in the September 2006 tri-series against Australia and West Indies in Malaysia, where he made an unbeaten 68 in the final group game against Australia, although India lost the game and were unable to reach the final.

== Politics ==
Mongia joined Bharatiya Janata Party in December 2021, ahead of the 2022 Punjab Legislative Assembly election.
