= Sairaj Bahutule =

Indian cricketer (born 1973)

Personal information
- Full name: Sairaj Vasant Bahutule
- Born: 6 January 1973 (age 53); Bombay, India
- Batting: Left-handed
- Bowling: Legbreak

International information
- National side: India
- Test debut (cap 235): 6 March 2001 v Australia
- Last Test: 29 August 2001 v Sri Lanka
- ODI debut (cap 108): 22 December 1997 v Sri Lanka
- Last ODI: 6 November 2003 v New Zealand

Career statistics
Competition	Test	ODI	FC
Matches	2	8	188
Runs scored	39	23	6,176
Batting average	13.00	7.66	31.83
100s/50s	0/0	0/0	9/26
Top score	21*	11	134*
Balls bowled	366	294	38,310
Wickets	3	2	630
Bowling average	67.66	141.50	26.00
5 wickets in innings	0	0	27
10 wickets in match	0	0	4
Best bowling	1/32	1/31	8/71
Catches/stumpings	1/–	3/–	82/–
- Source: ESPNcricinfo, 30 March 2025

Sairaj Bahutule (born 6 January 1973, Bombay, Maharashtra, India) is a former Indian cricketer. He was an all-rounder who bowled leg spin. Beginning in the 1991–92 season, he played domestic cricket for Mumbai, Maharashtra, Assam, Andhra and Vidarbha.

== Playing career ==
Standout performances, including a 13-wicket match haul for Mumbai in the Irani Cup, led him to be called into the Indian team in 1997. Three years later, an injury to Anil Kumble enabled him to be called up for a Test match against Australia, but he struggled in his two Tests.

He played in Scotland for five summers for Scottish Championship side Reigate Priory in the Premier Division.

Bahutule retired from first-class cricket on 1 January 2013.

He was one of the bowlers for St. Xavier's High School when Sachin Tendulkar and teammate Vinod Kambli scored an unbroken 664-run partnership for Shardashram Vidyamandir in a Lord Harris Shield inter-school game in 1988.

== Coaching career ==
In June 2014, Bahutule was appointed the coach of the Kerala cricket team. In July 2015, he was appointed coach of the Bengal cricket team.

In February 2018, he was appointed as spin bowling coach for Rajasthan Royals.

He was appointed as the Spin bowling coach of the Indian cricket team in May 2026.
