= Ramesh Powar =

Indian cricketer (born 1978)

Personal information
- Born: 20 May 1978 (age 48); Mumbai, Maharashtra, India
- Height: 5 ft 4 in (1.63 m)
- Batting: Right-handed
- Bowling: Right-arm off spin
- Relatives: Kiran Powar (brother)

International information
- National side: India (2004–2007)
- Test debut (cap 257): 18 May 2004 v Bangladesh
- Last Test: 25 May 2007 v Bangladesh
- ODI debut (cap 155): 16 March 2004 v Pakistan
- Last ODI: 2 October 2007 v Australia
- ODI shirt no.: 32

Domestic team information
- Years: Team
- 1999–2013: Mumbai
- 2013–2014: Rajasthan
- 2014–2015: Gujarat
- 2008–2010, 2012: Kings XI Punjab
- 2011: Kochi Tuskers Kerala

Career statistics
Competition	Test	ODI	FC	LA
Matches	2	31	148	113
Runs scored	13	163	4,245	1,081
Batting average	6.50	11.64	26.53	17.15
100s/50s	0/0	0/1	7/17	0/4
Top score	7	54	131	80
Balls bowled	252	1,536	29,158	5,557
Wickets	6	34	470	142
Bowling average	19.66	35.02	31.31	30.92
5 wickets in innings	0	0	27	1
10 wickets in match	0	0	4	0
Best bowling	3/33	3/24	7/44	5/53
Catches/stumpings	0/–	3/–	58/–	25/–
- Source: ESPNcricinfo, 26 March 2024

Ramesh Rajaram Powar (born 20 May 1978) is an Indian former cricketer who played two Tests and 31 One Day Internationals for India between 2004 and 2007. After retiring from playing he has served as the head coach of the India women's national cricket team.

== Cricket career ==
=== Playing ===
Powar was selected in 2000 for the first intake of the National Cricket Academy in Bangalore.

Powar was a consistent performer in domestic cricket for many seasons and was crucial to Mumbai cricket team's Ranji Trophy success in the 2002–03 season. Powar played first-class cricket for 16 years

Powar played for Sefton Park in the Liverpool and District Cricket Competition, signed as a late replacement for the injured Vinayak Mane in July 2005. He scored 325 league runs at 32.5 in ten games and took 25 wickets at 21 apiece.

He was first selected in the Indian squad for their tour of Pakistan. He did not return to the ODI side again until early 2006. His recall came on the back of 63 domestic wickets for 2005–06. It was the second season in a row that he had taken over 50 wickets.

However, in January 2007, he was dropped from the squad because of injury and Anil Kumble returned as the second spinner in the lead up to the 2007 Cricket World Cup.

In May 2008, he made his IPL debut for the Kings XI Punjab and picked up a wicket in the very first over he bowled. He represented Kings XI Punjab in the first three seasons of the IPL. He represented the defunct Kochi Tuskers Kerala franchise in the IPL in 2011. He returned to Kings XI Punjab in 2012, but featured in just one match.

In 2013, after representing Mumbai cricket team for 14 first-class seasons he shifted to Rajasthan cricket team where he had a poor season. He took 10 wickets at 62.20 from six matches. But in 2014, Powar became the first player of Rajasthan cricket team to move out as Rajasthan Cricket Association was suspended by BCCI. He joined Gujarat cricket team for next season.

In November 2015, Powar announced that he would retire from all forms of cricket following the conclusion of the 2015–16 Ranji Trophy.

=== Coaching ===
In July 2018, he was appointed as the head coach of India women's cricket team on an interim basis to oversee the training camp held in Bengaluru from 25 July to 3 August. A month later his term in charge was extended to the end of November this included a tour to Sri Lanka, a bilateral series in the West Indies in October followed by the 2018 ICC Women's World Twenty20.

During the 2018 World Twenty20, Powar got into a dispute with batter Mithali Raj, and as a consequence of that she was not allowed to play in the semi-final. Many fans of the Indian team cited this incident as the reason for the team's poor showing at the World Cup. The BCCI chose not to extend his contract after the tournament although leading players Harmanpreet Kaur and Smriti Mandhana requested he stay on.

In February 2021, he was appointed as Mumbai team's head coach for the Vijay Hazare Trophy.

Powar was selected as the head coach of the Indian women's cricket team in May 2021 succeeding Woorkeri Raman. He left the position in December 2022 as the BCCI switched him to working at the National Cricket Academy as a spin bowling coach.

== Personal life ==
He is an alumnus of Ruparel College of Science, Commerce and Arts in Matunga, Mumbai. His brother Kiran Powar also played cricket for Mumbai and coached the under-19s of Vidarbha cricket team.
