= Sridharan Sriram =

Indian cricket player

Personal information
- Born: 21 February 1976 (age 50); Chennai, Tamil Nadu, India
- Batting: Left-handed
- Bowling: Slow left-arm orthodox
- Role: Batsman

International information
- National side: India (2000-2004)
- ODI debut (cap 129): 19 March 2000 v South Africa
- Last ODI: 26 December 2004 v Bangladesh

Domestic team information
- Years: Team
- 1993/94–2005/06: Tamil Nadu
- 2006/07: Maharashtra
- 2009/10: Goa
- 2010/11: Assam
- 2011/12: Himachal Pradesh
- 2010: Royal Challengers Bangalore
- 2011: Delhi Capitals

Career statistics
| Competition | ODI | FC | LA | T20 |
|---|---|---|---|---|
| Matches | 8 | 133 | 147 | 15 |
| Runs scored | 81 | 9,539 | 4,169 | 233 |
| Batting average | 13.50 | 52.99 | 33.62 | 21.18 |
| 100s/50s | 0/1 | 32/36 | 4/26 | 0/0 |
| Top score | 57 | 288 | 148* | 39* |
| Balls bowled | 32 | 8,299 | 4,637 | 168 |
| Wickets | 3 | 85 | 115 | 4 |
| Bowling average | 30.44 | 46.07 | 30.51 | 56.75 |
| 5 wickets in innings | 0 | 0 | 1 | 0 |
| 10 wickets in match | 0 | 0 | 0 | 0 |
| Best bowling | 3/43 | 4/26 | 5/43 | 1/19 |
| Catches/stumpings | 0/– | 68/– | 44/– | 7/– |
Medal record
Men's Cricket
Representing India
ICC Champions Trophy
| Runner-up | 2000 Kenya |
- Source: CricketArchive, 19 August 2020

Sridharan Sriram (born 21 February 1976) is an Indian cricket coach and former cricketer. He is a left-handed batsman and a left-arm orthodox spin bowler. He played in the Indian Cricket League and the Indian Premier League. He was a part of the squad which finished as runners-up at the 2000 ICC Champions Trophy. On 19 August 2022, he was appointed as the technical consultant (T20I) of the Bangladesh national cricket team till the 2022 T20 World Cup.

== Playing career ==
Sriram started his cricketing career as a left-arm spinner and took 29 wickets on India's Under-19 tour of South Africa in the 1992–93 season. However, playing for Tamil Nadu, it was his batting which brought him wider recognition. His most prolific season was in 1999-2000 when he scored 1075 runs in the Ranji Trophy including 5 centuries, and was named as an Indian Cricket Cricketer of the Year. Sriram was selected in 2000 for the first intake of the National Cricket Academy in Bangalore.

His consistent domestic form resulted in a call-up to the India national cricket team, and he made his One Day International debut against South Africa at Nagpur on 19 March 2000. However, a string of low scores meant that he lost his place in the squad after 6 matches.

Sriram continued to score heavily in domestic cricket for Tamil Nadu, and he earned a second chance with the national team for the tour of Bangladesh in 2004-05. He played in the first 2 ODIs, taking 3 wickets in the first, and scoring 57 in a losing cause in the second. However, this was to be his last match for India.

He moved from Tamil Nadu to Maharashtra in 2006 and later played for Goa. Sriram has also played as an overseas player for the Scottish Saltires in English domestic cricket in 2004, and has been regularly selected for the South Zone cricket team in the Duleep Trophy.

In 2007, Sriram decided to sign with the Indian Cricket League. Although he quit Indian Cricket League in 2009 and accepted an amnesty offer from the BCCI to be considered for selection at international level.

== Coaching career ==
He worked with the Australia A squad that toured India in 2015. He was also named as a coaching consultant for the Australian cricket team during the Test series in Bangladesh in 2015. He also accompanied the Australian cricket team during the 2019 Ashes.

In 2019, he was appointed as the batting and spin bowling coach of Royal Challengers Bangalore. He also was a spin bowling coach for Australia which hosted India for 4 match test series in 2018. On 19 August 2022, he was confirmed as a technical consultant for Bangladesh for T20Is format.

In 2025, he was appointed as the assistant bowling coach by Chennai Super Kings for IPL 2025 season.
