= Krishna Hariharan =

Indian cricket umpire (born 1955)

Personal information
- Born: 24 September 1955 (age 71)
- Nickname: Hari
- Role: Umpire

Umpiring information
- Tests umpired: 2 (2005–2006)
- ODIs umpired: 34 (1997–2006)
- WODIs umpired: 1 (1997)
- Source: ESPNcricinfo, 14 July 2013

Krishna Hariharan (born 24 September 1955) is an Indian Test cricket umpire.

Hariharan became a Twenty20 cricket umpire in 2001. He officiated in 34 One-day Internationals from 1997 to 2006, but only two Test matches. He made his debut as a Test umpire in the 1st Test between England and Bangladesh at Lord's in May 2005, in which England lost only 3 wickets to win by an innings and 261 runs within three days, and then stood in the 2nd Test between Bangladesh and Sri Lanka at Boghra in March 2006, which Sri Lanka won by 10 wickets early on the fourth day. He also umpired matches in the Indian Premier League in 2008, 2009 and 2010 seasons.

== See also ==
- List of Test cricket umpires
- List of One Day International cricket umpires
