= Arani Jayaprakash =

Indian cricketer and umpire (born 1949)

Arani Velayudham Jayaprakash (born 20 June 1949 in Karnataka) is an Indian former first-class cricketer and Test cricket umpire.

== Cricket career ==
Jayaprakash played 79 first-class matches, starting with 3 matches for Mysore in the 1971/72 and 1972/73 Ranji Trophy, and continuing when the team was renamed Karnataka until 1984/85. He played in 6 Ranji Trophy finals for Karnataka, winning in 1973/4, 1977/78 and 1982/3, and losing the final to Bombay in 1974/5, and to Delhi in 1978/9 and 1981/2.

An all-rounder, he scored 3,727 runs in 125 innings, at an average of 35.49, including 6 centuries and 21 half-centuries. He reached his top score of 150* in the Ranji Trophy quarterfinal against Bengal in February 1979, having also scored 69 in the first innings. As a bowler, he took 60 wickets at an average of 37.13, with best bowling of 3–12 opening the bowling against Andhra in November 1978. In the same match, he scored 150, and then took 2–38 in Andhra's second innings.

He also played in 15 List A one-day matches, including for the South Zone team that won the Deodhar Trophy in 1974/75, and losing finals sides in 1976/77 and 1978/79, and in the Karnataka team that lost the final of the Wills Trophy in 1983/84.

== Umpiring ==
Jayaprakash became an umpire after retiring from first-class cricket. He umpired in 13 Test matches between 1997 and 2002, mostly played in India. He made his debut as a Test umpire in the 3rd Test between India and Sri Lanka at Mumbai in December 1997. In his second Test, the 2nd Test between India and Pakistan in Delhi in 1999, he stood at the bowler's end while Anil Kumble dismissed all 10 batsmen in Pakistan's 2nd innings.

He has stood in four Tests outside India: the 3rd Test between New Zealand and Australia at Hamilton in March 2000, the 1st Test between South Africa and New Zealand at Bloemfontein in November 2000, the 1st Test between Sri Lanka and England at Galle in February 2001, and the 2nd Test between Zimbabwe and West Indies at Harare in July 2001. His last Test was the 2nd Test between India and Zimbabwe at Delhi in February 2002. His performance in the 2001 match in Galle was sharply criticised. He was not selected to umpire a Test match after the Elite Panel of ICC Umpires was instituted in April 2002.

Jayaprakash also umpired 38 One-day Internationals between 1993 and 2006, mostly in India, apart from matches in the 2000 Asia Cup, two pool matches in South Africa in the 2003 Cricket World Cup, and the Cherry Blossom Sharjah Cup in 2003. He umpired 7 matches in the Indian Premier League in 2007/08.

He announced his retirement as an umpire from all forms of cricket in 2008.

== See also ==
- List of Test cricket umpires
- List of One Day International cricket umpires
