= India B cricket team =

India 'B'
- Association: Board of Control for Cricket in India (BCCI)

Team information
- Founded: 1994

History
- First-class debut: India Seniors in 19 March 1995 at Eden Gardens, Kolkata
- Official website: bcci.tv
First-class kit
List A kit
T20 kit

The India B cricket team is a national cricket team representing third-tier cricket of India national cricket team. The matches played by India B receive first-class, List A and Twenty20 classification.

After its formation, the team participated in the NKP Salve Challenger Trophy. These teams are usually assembled for prominent domestic tournaments like the Duleep Trophy and Deodhar Trophy.

== See also ==
- India men's national cricket team
- India women's national cricket team
- India national under-19 cricket team
- India women's national under-19 cricket team
- India A cricket team
- Board of Control for Cricket in India (BCCI)
- BCCI Awards
- National Cricket Academy (NCA)
- Cricket in India
- Sport in India – Overview of sports in India
- Glossary of cricket terms
