= List of India Test cricket records =

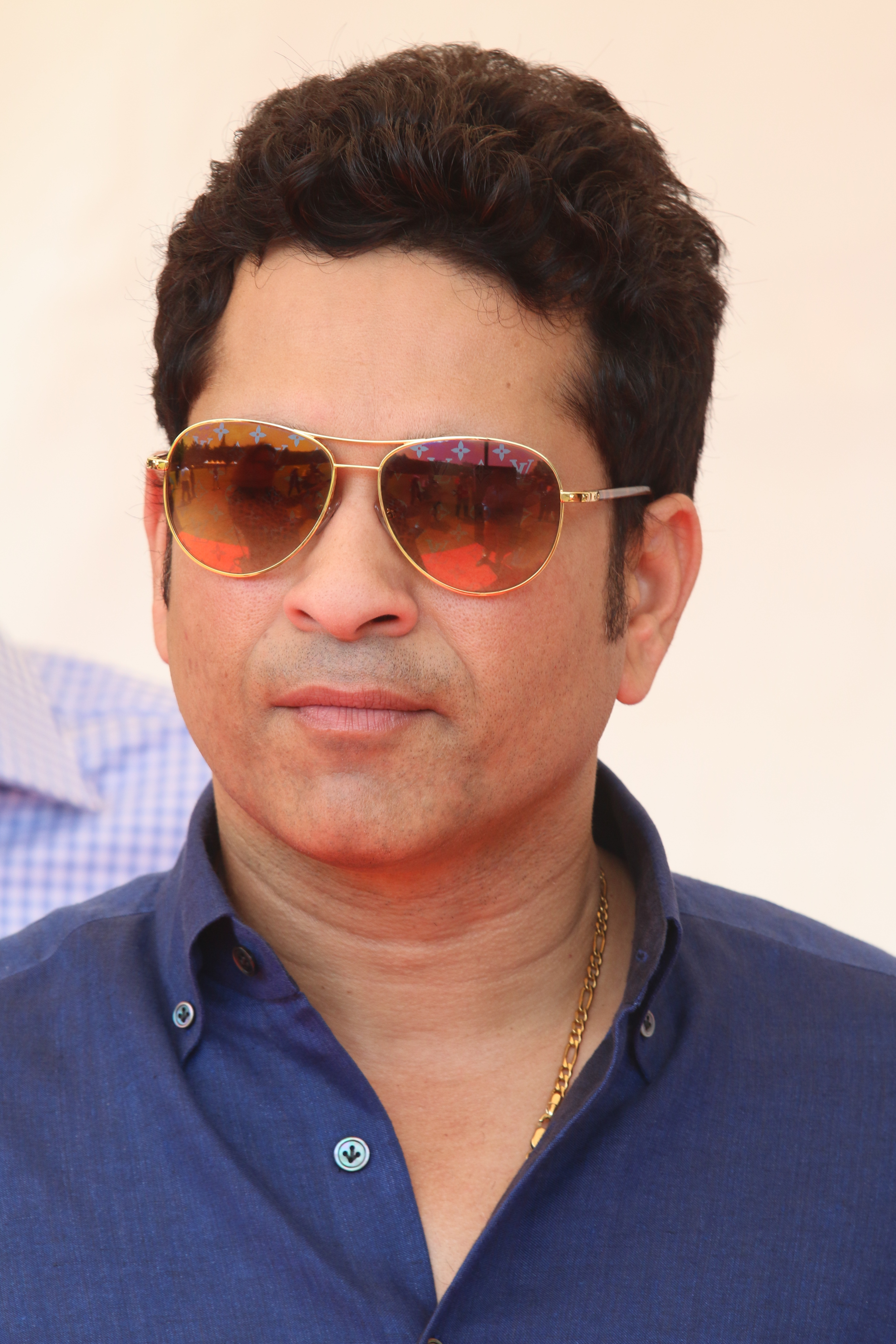
Sachin Tendulkar, widely acknowledged as one of the greatest batsmen of all time, still holds several records.

Test cricket is the oldest form of cricket played at international level. A Test match is scheduled to take place over a period of five days, (Note: For the first 50 years of Test cricket matches were played over three or four days and until the 1930s some timeless Tests were played.) (Note: In October 2017, the ICC Board approved a trial of four-day Test cricket to run through until the 2019 Cricket World Cup.) and is played by teams representing full member nations of the International Cricket Council (ICC).

This is a list of Indian Cricket team's Test Cricket records. It is based on the List of Test cricket records, but concentrates solely on records dealing with the Indian cricket team. India was granted Test status in 1932 to be the sixth nation to play Test cricket.

== Key ==
The top five records are listed for each category, except for the team wins, losses, draws and ties and the partnership records. Tied records for fifth place are also included. Explanations of the general symbols and cricketing terms used in the list are given below. Specific details are provided in each category where appropriate. All records include matches played by India only.

Key
| Symbol | Meaning |
|---|---|
| † | Player or umpire is currently active in Test cricket |
| * | Player remained not out or partnership remained unbroken |
| ♠ | Test cricket record |
| d | Innings was declared (e.g. 8/758d) |
| Date | Starting date of the Test match |
| Innings | Number of innings played |
| Matches | Number of matches played |
| Opposition | The team India was playing against |
| Period | The time period when the player was active in Test cricket |
| Player | The player involved in the record |
| Venue | Test cricket ground where the match was played |

== Team records ==
=== Overall Record ===
| Matches | Won | Lost | Drawn | Tied | Win % |
|---|---|---|---|---|---|
| 601 | 187 | 188 | 225 | 1 | 31.11 |
Last Updated: 29 August 2026

=== Team wins, losses, draws and ties ===
As of 27 August 2026, India played 601 Test matches resulting in 187 victories, 188 defeats, 225 draws, and 1 tie for an overall winning percentage of 31.11

| Won more matches than lost |
| All matches drawn/tied/no result |
| Won equal matches to lost |
| Lost more matches than won |

| Opponent | Matches | Won | Lost | Tied | Draw | % Won | % Lost | % Drew | First | Last |
|---|---|---|---|---|---|---|---|---|---|---|
| Afghanistan | 2 | 2 | 0 | 0 | 0 | 100.00 | 0.00 | 0.00 | 2018 | 2026 |
| Australia | 112 | 33 | 48 | 1 | 30 | 29.91 | 43.30 | 26.78 | 1947 | 2025 |
| Bangladesh | 15 | 13 | 0 | 0 | 2 | 86.66 | 0.00 | 13.33 | 2000 | 2024 |
| England | 141 | 37 | 53 | 0 | 51 | 26.24 | 37.58 | 36.17 | 1932 | 2025 |
| New Zealand | 65 | 22 | 16 | 0 | 27 | 33.84 | 24.61 | 41.53 | 1955 | 2024 |
| Pakistan | 59 | 9 | 12 | 0 | 38 | 15.25 | 20.33 | 64.40 | 1952 | 2007 |
| South Africa | 46 | 16 | 20 | 0 | 10 | 34.78 | 43.47 | 21.73 | 1992 | 2025 |
| Sri Lanka | 48 | 23 | 7 | 0 | 18 | 47.92 | 14.58 | 37.50 | 1982 | 2026 |
| West Indies | 102 | 25 | 30 | 0 | 47 | 24.51 | 29.41 | 46.08 | 1948 | 2025 |
| Zimbabwe | 11 | 7 | 2 | 0 | 2 | 63.63 | 18.18 | 18.18 | 1992 | 2005 |
| Total | 601 | 187 | 188 | 1 | 225 | 31.11 | 31.28 | 37.44 | 1932 | 2026 |
Statistics are correct as of India v Sri Lanka at Sinhalese Sports Club Cricket Ground, Colombo, 2nd Test, 23 August - 27 August 2026.

=== First Test series wins ===
| Opponent | Year of first Home win | Year of first Away win |
|---|---|---|
| Afghanistan | 2018 | YTP |
| Australia | 1979 | 2018 |
| Bangladesh | 2017 | 2000 |
| England | 1961 | 1971 |
| Ireland | YTP | |
| New Zealand | 1955 | 1968 |
| Pakistan | 1952 | 2004 |
| South Africa | 1996 | - |
| Sri Lanka | 1986 | 1993 |
| West Indies | 1978 | 1971 |
| Zimbabwe | 1993 | 2005 |
Last updated: 15 January 2022

=== First Test match wins ===
| Opponent | Home | | Away | |
| Opponent | Venue | Year | Venue | Year |
|---|---|---|---|---|
| Afghanistan | Bangalore | 2018 | YTP | |
| Australia | Kanpur | 1959 | Melbourne | 1978 |
| Bangladesh | Hyderabad | 2017 | Dhaka | 2000 |
| England | Madras | 1952 | The Oval | 1971 |
| Ireland | YTP | | | |
| New Zealand | Bombay | 1955 | Dunedin | 1968 |
| Pakistan | Delhi | 1952 | Multan | 2004 |
| South Africa | Ahmedabad | 1996 | Johannesburg | 2006 |
| Sri Lanka | Nagpur | 1986 | Colombo (SSC) | 1993 |
| West Indies | Calcutta | 1974 | Port of Spain | 1971 |
| Zimbabwe | Delhi | 1993 | Bulawayo | 2001 |
Last updated: 20 June 2018

=== Team scoring records ===
==== Most runs in an innings ====
The highest innings total scored in Test cricket came in the series between Sri Lanka and India in August 1997. Playing in the first Test at R. Premadasa Stadium in Colombo, the hosts posted a first innings total of 6/952d. This broke the longstanding record of 7/903d which England set against Australia in the final Test of the 1938 Ashes series at The Oval. The fifth and last Test of the 2016–17 series against England saw India set their highest innings total of 759/7d.

| Rank | Score | Opposition | Venue | Date |
|---|---|---|---|---|
| 1 | 759/7d | England | M. A. Chidambaram Stadium, Chennai, India | 16 December 2016 |
| 2 | 729/6d | Sri Lanka | Brabourne Stadium, Mumbai, India | 2 December 2009 |
| 3 | 720/9d | New Zealand | Basin Reserve, Wellington, New Zealand | 19 November 2026 |
| 4 | 707 | Sri Lanka | Singhalese Sports Club Cricket Ground, Colombo, Sri Lanka | 26 July 2010 |
| 5 | 705/7d | Australia | Sydney Cricket Ground, Sydney, Australia | 2 January 2004 |
Last updated: 22 November 2026

==== Highest successful run chases ====
India's highest fourth-innings total is 445 all out in an unsuccessful run chase against Australia at Adelaide in January 1978. Australia had set a target of 493. India's second-highest fourth-innings total of 429/8 came against England at The Oval in 1979. Having been set a target of 438 runs, India required 9 runs to win with 2 wickets in hand when the fifth day's play ended resulting in a draw. India's highest successful run chase occurred against the West Indies at Port of Spain in 1976 and is also their third-highest fourth-innings total. West Indies had set India a target of 403.

| Rank | Score | Target | Opposition | Venue | Date |
|---|---|---|---|---|---|
| 1 | 406/4 | 403 | West Indies | Queen's Park Oval, Port of Spain, Trinidad and Tobago | 7 April 1976 |
| 2 | 387/4 | 387 | England | M. A. Chidambaram Stadium, Chennai, India | 11 December 2008 |
| 3 | 329/7 | 328 | Australia | The Gabba, Brisbane, Australia | 15 January 2021 |
| 4 | 276/5 | 276 | West Indies | Arun Jaitley Stadium, Delhi, India | 11 November 2011 |
| 5 | 264/3 | 264 | Sri Lanka | Asgiriya Stadium, Kandy, Sri Lanka | 22 August 2001 |
Last updated: 19 January 2021

==== Fewest runs in an innings ====
The lowest score in Test history for India is 36 scored in their second innings against Australia in the first Test of the 2020 Australian tour.

| Rank | Score | Opposition | Venue | Date |
|---|---|---|---|---|
| 1 | 36 | Australia | Adelaide Oval, Adelaide, Australia | 17 December 2020 |
| 2 | 42 | England | Lord's, London, England | 20 June 1974 |
| 3 | 46 | New Zealand | M. Chinnaswamy Stadium, Bengaluru, India | 16 October 2024 |
| 4 | 58 | Australia | The Gabba, Brisbane, Australia | 28 November 1947 |
| 4 | 58 | England | Old Trafford Cricket Ground, Manchester, England | 17 July 1952 |
Last updated: 17 October 2024

==== Most runs conceded in an innings ====
The highest innings total scored against India is by Sri Lanka when they scored 952/6d in the first Test of the Indian's tour of Sri Lanka in 1997 at R. Premadasa Stadium.

| Rank | Score | Opposition | Venue | Date |
|---|---|---|---|---|
| 1 | 952/6d ♠ | Sri Lanka | R. Premadasa Stadium, Colombo, Sri Lanka | 2 August 1997 |
| 2 | 760/7d | Sri Lanka | Sardar Patel Stadium, Ahmedabad, India | 16 November 2009 |
| 3 | 710/7d | England | Edgbaston Cricket Ground, Birmingham, England | 10 August 2011 |
| 4 | 699/5 | Pakistan | Gaddafi Stadium, Lahore, Pakistan | 1 December 1989 |
| 5 | 680/8d | New Zealand | Basin Reserve, Wellington, New Zealand | 14 February 2014 |
Last updated: 23 August 2020

==== Fewest runs conceded in an innings ====
The lowest innings total scored against India is 55 in the second test of India's tour of South Africa in 2023-24

| Rank | Score | Opposition | Venue | Date |
|---|---|---|---|---|
| 1 | 55 | South Africa | Newlands Cricket Ground, Cape Town, South Africa | 3 January 2024 |
| 2 | 62 | New Zealand | Wankhede Stadium, Mumbai, India | 3 December 2021 |
| 3 | 79 | South Africa | Vidarbha Cricket Association Stadium, Nagpur, India | 25 November 2015 |
| 4 | 81 | England | Narendra Modi Stadium, Ahmedabad, India | 24 February 2021 |
| 5 | 82 | Sri Lanka | Sector 16 Stadium, Chandigarh, India | 23 November 1990 |
Last updated: 25 February 2021

=== Result records ===
A Test match is won when one side has scored more runs than the total runs scored by the opposing side during their two innings. If both sides have completed both their allocated innings and the side that fielded last has the higher aggregate of runs, it is known as a win by runs. This indicates the number of runs that they had scored more than the opposing side. If one side scores more runs in a single innings than the total runs scored by the other side in both their innings, it is known as a win by innings and runs. If the side batting last wins the match, it is known as a win by wickets, indicating the number of wickets that were still to fall.

==== Greatest win margins (by innings) ====
The fifth Test of the 1938 Ashes series at The Oval saw England win by an innings and 579 runs, the largest victory by an innings in Test cricket history.

| Rank | Margin | Opposition | Venue | Date |
|---|---|---|---|---|
| 1 | Innings and 300 runs | Afghanistan | Maharaja Yadavindra Singh International Cricket Stadium, New Chandigarh, India | 6 June 2026 |
| 2 | Innings and 272 runs | West Indies | Saurashtra Cricket Association Stadium, Rajkot, India | 4 October 2018 |
| 3 | Innings and 262 runs | Afghanistan | M. Chinnaswamy Stadium, Bengaluru, India | 14 June 2018 |
| 4 | Innings and 239 runs | Bangladesh | Sher-e-Bangla National Cricket Stadium, Mirpur, Bangladesh | 25 May 2007 |
| 4 | Innings and 239 runs | Sri Lanka | Vidarbha Cricket Association Stadium, Nagpur, India | 24 November 2017 |
Last updated: 8 June 2026

==== Greatest win margins (by runs) ====
The largest victory recorded by India, the 8th largest overall, is the third Test of England's 2024 tour of India by 434 runs.

| Rank | Margin | Opposition | Venue | Date |
|---|---|---|---|---|
| 1 | 434 runs | England | Niranjan Shah Stadium, Rajkot, India | 15 February 2024 |
| 2 | 372 runs | New Zealand | Wankhede Stadium, Mumbai, India | 3 December 2021 |
| 3 | 337 runs | South Africa | Feroz Shah Kotla Ground, Delhi, India | 3 December 2015 |
| 4 | 336 runs | England | Edgbaston, Birmingham, England | 6 July 2025 |
| 5 | 321 runs | New Zealand | Holkar Cricket Stadium, Indore, India | 8 October 2016 |
Last updated: 25 February 2021

==== Greatest win margins (by 10 wickets) ====
India have won a Test match by a margin of 10 wickets on 9 occasions.

| Rank | Number of Victories | Opposition | Most Recent Venue | Date |
|---|---|---|---|---|
| 1 | 2 | Pakistan | M.A. Chidambaram Stadium, Chennai, India | 15 January 1980 |
| 1 | 2 | New Zealand | Seddon Park, Hamilton, New Zealand | 18 March 2009 |
| 1 | 2 | England | Narendra Modi Stadium, Ahmedabad, India | 24 February 2021 |
| 4 | 1 | Zimbabwe | Harare Sports Club, Harare, Zimbabwe | 20 September 2005 |
| 4 | 1 | Bangladesh | Shere Bangla National Stadium, Mirpur, Bangladesh | 24 January 2010 |
| 4 | 1 | West Indies | Rajiv Gandhi International Cricket Stadium, Hyderabad, India | 12 October 2018 |
Last updated: 25 February 2021

==== Narrowest win margins (by runs) ====
India's narrowest win by runs was against England in the fifth Test of the 2025 Anderson-Tendulkar Trophy at The Oval. Set 374 runs for victory in the final innings, England were bowled all out for 367 to give victory to India by six runs. This was the equal eight-narrowest win in Test cricket, with the narrowest being the West Indies' one-run win over Australia in 1993 and New Zealand over England in 2023.

| Rank | Margin | Opposition | Venue | Date |
|---|---|---|---|---|
| 1 | 6 runs | England | The Oval, London, England | 31 July 2025 |
| 2 | 13 runs | Australia | Wankhede Stadium, Mumbai, India | 3 November 2004 |
| 3 | 28 runs | England | Eden Gardens, Kolkata, India | 30 December 1972 |
| 4 | 31 runs | Australia | Adelaide Oval, Adelaide, Australia | 6 December 2018 |
| 5 | 37 runs | West Indies | Queen's Park Oval, Port of Spain, Trinidad | 19 April 2002 |
Last updated: 4 August 2025

==== Narrowest win margins (by wickets) ====
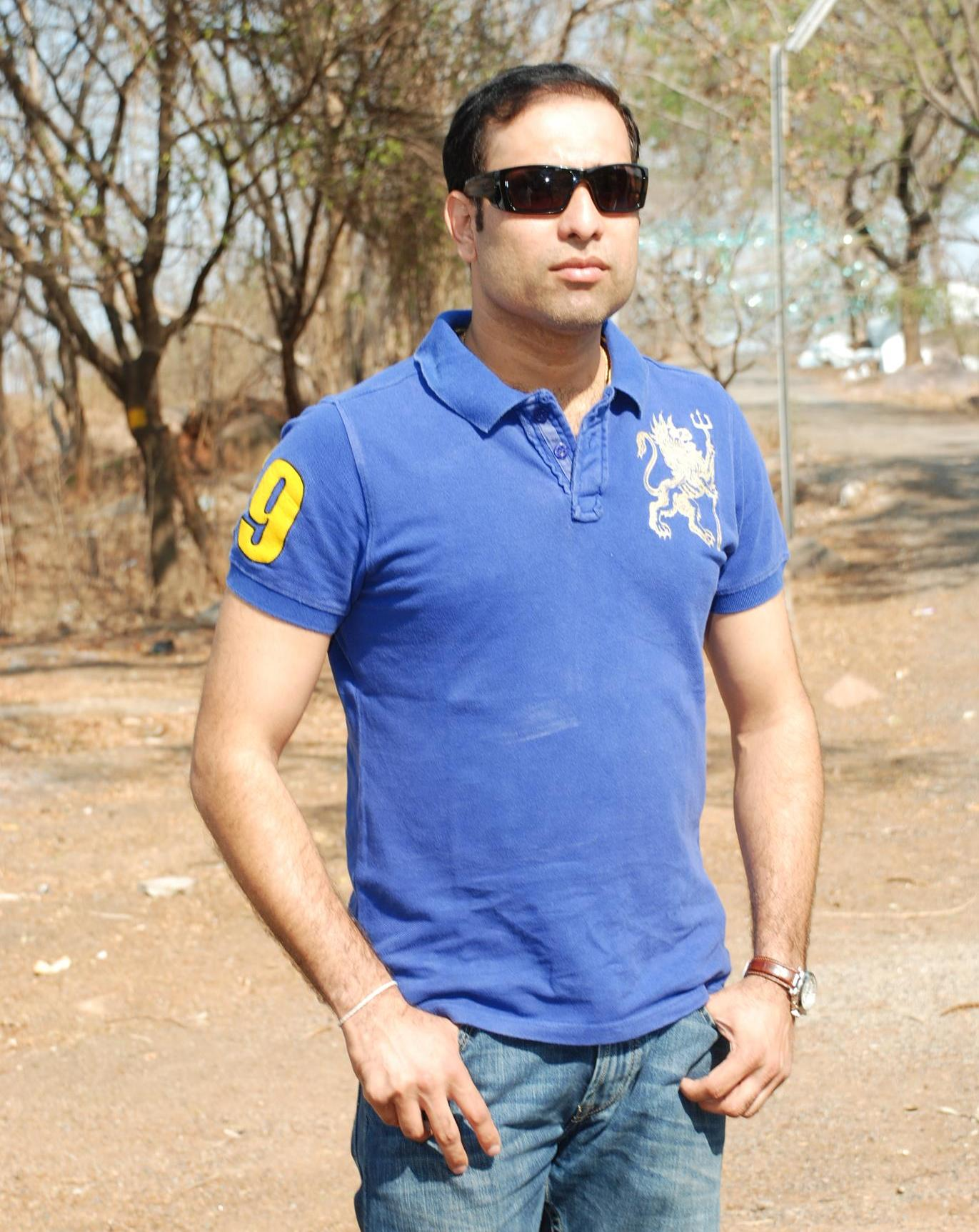
VVS Laxman played a leading role in India's narrowest victory by wickets against Australia in October 2010.

India's narrowest win by wickets came in the first Test of the Border-Gavaskar Trophy in October 2010. Played at the PCA Stadium, the hosts won the match by a margin of one wicket, one of only fourteen one-wicket victories in Test cricket.

| Rank | Margin | Opposition | Venue | Date |
|---|---|---|---|---|
| 1 | 1 wicket | Australia | Punjab Cricket Association Stadium, Mohali, India | 1 October 2010 |
| 2 | 2 wickets | Australia | Brabourne Stadium, Mumbai, India | 10 October 1964 |
| 2 | 2 wickets | Australia | M.A. Chidambaram Stadium, Chennai, India | 18 March 2001 |
| 4 | 3 wickets | West Indies | M.A. Chidambaram Stadium, Chennai, India | 12 January 1979 |
| 4 | 3 wickets | Australia | The Gabba, Brisbane, Australia | 15 January 2021 |
| 4 | 3 wickets | Bangladesh | Sher-e-Bangla National Cricket Stadium, Mirpur, Bangladesh | 22 December 2022 |
Last updated: 22 December 2022

==== Greatest loss margins (by innings) ====
The Oval in London played host the greatest defeat by an innings in Test cricket. The final Test of the 1938 Ashes saw England defeat the tourists by an innings and 579 runs, to the draw the series at one match all. India's biggest defeat came at home during the West Indies tour in 1958 when they lost by an innings and 336 runs at Eden Gardens, Kolkata.

| Rank | Margin | Opposition | Venue | Date |
|---|---|---|---|---|
| 1 | Innings and 336 runs | West Indies | Eden Gardens, Kolkata, India | 31 December 1958 |
| 2 | Innings and 285 runs | England | Lord's, London, England | 20 June 1974 |
| 3 | Innings and 244 runs | England | The Oval, London, England | 15 August 2014 |
| 4 | Innings and 242 runs | England | Edgbaston Cricket Ground, Birmingham, England | 10 August 2011 |
| 5 | Innings and 239 runs | Sri Lanka | Sinhalese Sports Club Ground, Colombo, Sri Lanka | 23 July 2008 |
Last updated: 20 June 2020

==== Greatest loss margins (by runs) ====
The first Test of the 1928–29 Ashes series saw Australia defeated by England by 675 runs, the greatest losing margin by runs in Test cricket. India's biggest defeat by runs was against South Africa in the second Test of the South African cricket team in India in 2025–26 at the Assam Cricket Association Stadium.

| Rank | Margin | Opposition | Venue | Date |
|---|---|---|---|---|
| 1 | 408 runs | South Africa | Assam Cricket Association Stadium, Guwahati, India | 22 November 2025 |
| 2 | 342 runs | Australia | Vidarbha Cricket Association Stadium, Nagpur, India | 26 October 2004 |
| 3 | 341 runs | Pakistan | National Stadium, Karachi, Pakistan | 29 January 2006 |
| 4 | 337 runs | Australia | Melbourne Cricket Ground, Melbourne, Australia | 26 December 2007 |
| 5 | 333 runs | Australia | Maharashtra Cricket Association Stadium, Pune, India | 23 February 2017 |
Last updated: 26 November 2025

==== Greatest loss margins (by 10 wickets) ====
India have lost a Test match by a margin of 10 wickets on 18 occasions with most recent being during the 2nd test of the India's tour of New Zealand in 2020.

| Rank | Defeats | Opposition | Most recent venue | Date |
|---|---|---|---|---|
| 1 | 4 | West Indies | Kensington Oval, Bridgetown, West Indies | 2 May 2002 |
| 1 | 4 | England | Wankhede Stadium, Mumbai, India | 23 November 2012 |
| 1 | 4 | Australia | Adelaide Oval, Adelaide, Australia | 8 December 2024 |
| 4 | 3 | New Zealand | Basin Reserve, Wellington, New Zealand | 21 February 2020 |
| 5 | 2 | Sri Lanka | Galle International Stadium, Galle, Sri Lanka | 18 July 2010 |
| 6 | 1 | Pakistan | Iqbal Stadium, Faisalabad, Pakistan | 3 January 1983 |
| 6 | 1 | South Africa | Kingsmead, Durban, South Africa | 26 December 2013 |
Last updated: 20 June 2020

==== Narrowest loss margins (by runs) ====
The narrowest loss of India in terms of runs is by 12 runs against Pakistan in the first test of the Pakistan's tour of India in 1999.

| Rank | Margin | Opposition | Venue | Date |
|---|---|---|---|---|
| 1 | 12 runs | Pakistan | MA Chidambaram Stadium, Chennai, India | 28 January 1999 |
| 2 | 16 runs | Australia | The Gabba, Brisbane, Australia | 2 December 1977 |
| 2 | 16 runs | Pakistan | M. Chinnaswamy Stadium, Bangalore, India | 13 March 1987 |
| 4 | 22 runs | England | Lord's, London, England | 14 July 2025 |
| 5 | 25 runs | New Zealand | Wankhede Stadium, Mumbai, India | 1 November 2024 |
Last updated: 30 July 2025

==== Narrowest loss margins (by wickets) ====
The narrowest loss of India in terms of wickets is by 2 wickets against Australia in the second test of India's tour of Australia in 1978-79.

| Rank | Margin | Opposition | Venue | Date |
|---|---|---|---|---|
| 1 | 2 wicket | Australia | WACA Ground, Perth, Australia | 16 December 1977 |
| 2 | 4 wickets | West Indies | Sabina Park, Kingston, Jamaica | 23 February 1983 |
| 2 | 4 wickets | New Zealand | Basin Reserve, Wellington, New Zealand | 26 December 1998 |
| 2 | 4 wickets | South Africa | Wankhede Stadium, Mumbai, India | 24 February 2000 |
| 2 | 4 wickets | Zimbabwe | Harare Sports Club, Harare, Zimbabwe | 15 June 2001 |
| 2 | 4 wickets | New Zealand | Seddon Park, Hamilton, New Zealand | 19 December 2002 |
| 2 | 4 wickets | Australia | The Gabba, Brisbane, Australia | 17 December 2014 |
Last updated: 20 June 2020

==== Tied matches ====
A tie can occur when the scores of both teams are equal at the conclusion of play, provided that the side batting last has completed their innings. Only two matches have ended in a tie in Test cricket history, both of which involved Australia.

| Opposition | Venue | Date |
|---|---|---|
| Australia ♠ | M. A. Chidambaram Stadium, Chennai, India | 18 September 1986 |
Last updated: 3 December 2017

== Batting records ==
=== Most career runs ===
A run is the basic means of scoring in cricket. A run is scored when the batsman hits the ball with his bat and with his partner runs the length of 22 yards (20 m) of the pitch. Alternatively, a player can score multiple runs by hitting the aforementioned ball out of the boundary rope for 4 or 6 runs. India's Sachin Tendulkar has scored the most runs in Test cricket with 15,921. Second is Ricky Ponting of Australia with 13,378 ahead of Jacques Kallis from South Africa in third with 13,289. Rahul Dravid and Sunil Gavaskar are the only other Indian batsmen who have scored more than 10,000 runs in Test cricket.

| Rank | Runs | Player | Matches | Innings | Average | 100 | 50 | Period |
|---|---|---|---|---|---|---|---|---|
| 1 | 15,921 | Sachin Tendulkar | 200 | 329 | 53.78 | 51 | 68 | 1989–2013 |
| 2 | 13,265 | Rahul Dravid | 163 | 284 | 52.63 | 36 | 63 | 1996–2012 |
| 3 | 10,122 | Sunil Gavaskar | 125 | 214 | 51.12 | 34 | 45 | 1971–1987 |
| 4 | 9,230 | Virat Kohli | 123 | 210 | 46.85 | 30 | 31 | 2011–2025 |
| 5 | 8,781 | VVS Laxman | 134 | 225 | 45.97 | 17 | 56 | 1996–2012 |
| 6 | 8,503 | Virender Sehwag | 103 | 178 | 49.43 | 23 | 31 | 2001–2013 |
| 7 | 7,212 | Sourav Ganguly | 113 | 188 | 42.17 | 16 | 35 | 1996–2008 |
| 8 | 7,195 | Cheteshwar Pujara | 103 | 176 | 43.60 | 19 | 35 | 2010–2023 |
| 9 | 6,868 | Dilip Vengsarkar | 116 | 185 | 42.13 | 17 | 35 | 1976–1992 |
| 10 | 6,215 | Mohammad Azharuddin | 99 | 147 | 45.03 | 22 | 21 | 1984–2000 |
Last updated: 5 January 2025

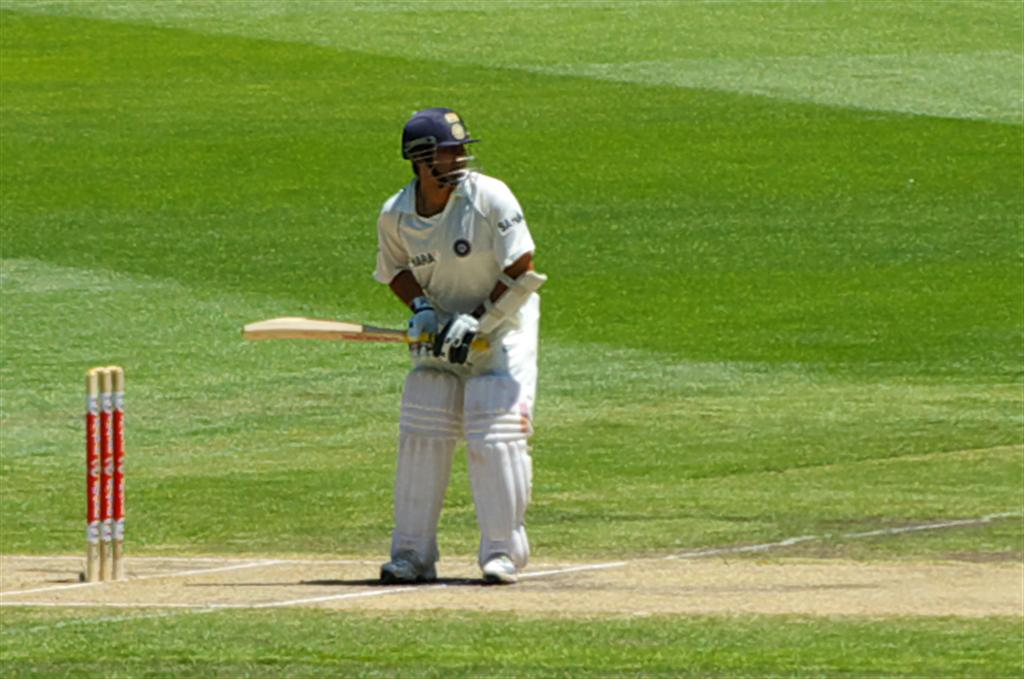
Sachin Tendulkar holds the world record for most Test runs (15,921) and the most centuries (51).

=== Most career runs as captain ===
| Rank | Runs | Player | Matches | Innings | Average | 100 | 50 | Period |
|---|---|---|---|---|---|---|---|---|
| 1 | 5,864 | Virat Kohli | 68 | 113 | 54.80 | 20 | 18 | 2014–2022 |
| 2 | 3,454 | MS Dhoni | 60 | 96 | 40.63 | 5 | 24 | 2008–2014 |
| 3 | 3,449 | Sunil Gavaskar | 47 | 74 | 50.72 | 11 | 14 | 1976–1985 |
| 4 | 2,856 | Mohammad Azharuddin | 47 | 68 | 43.93 | 9 | 9 | 1990–1999 |
| 5 | 2,561 | Sourav Ganguly | 49 | 75 | 37.66 | 5 | 13 | 2000–2005 |
Last updated: 14 January 2022

=== Fastest runs getter ===
| Runs | Batsman | Match | Innings | Record Date | Reference |
|---|---|---|---|---|---|
| 1000 | Vinod Kambli | 12 | 14 | 18 November 1994 | |
| 2000 | Yashasvi Jaiswal | 21 | 40 | 5 July 2025 | |
| 3000 | Virender Sehwag | 34 | 55 | 24 March 2005 | |
| 4000 | Virender Sehwag | 48 | 79 | 22 June 2006 | |
| 5000 | Sunil Gavaskar | 52 | 95 | 19 September 1979 | |
| 6000 | Sunil Gavaskar | 65 | 117 | 23 January 1981 | |
| 7000 | Virender Sehwag | 79 | 134 | 3 August 2010 | |
| 8000 | Sachin Tendulkar | 96 | 154 | 18 May 2002 | |
| 9000 | Rahul Dravid | 104 | 176 | 30 June 2006 | |
| 10000 | Sachin Tendulkar | 122 | 195 | 16 March 2005 | |
| 11000 | Sachin Tendulkar | 139 | 223 | 27 July 2007 | |
| 12000 | Sachin Tendulkar | 152 | 247 | 17 October 2008 | |
| 13000 | Sachin Tendulkar | 163 ♠ | 266 ♠ | 17 January 2010 | |
| 14000 | Sachin Tendulkar | 171 ♠ | 279 ♠ | 9 October 2010 | |
| 15000 | Sachin Tendulkar | 182 ♠ | 300 ♠ | 6 November 2011 | |
Last updated: 20 June 2020

=== Most runs in each batting position ===
| Batting position | Batsman | Innings | Runs | Average | Test Career Span | Ref |
|---|---|---|---|---|---|---|
| Opener | Sunil Gavaskar | 203 | 9,607 | 50.30 | 1971–1987 | |
| Number 3 | Rahul Dravid | 219 | 10,524 | 52.88 | 1996–2012 | |
| Number 4 | Sachin Tendulkar | 275 | 13,492 | 54.40 | 1989–2013 | |
| Number 5 | Mohammad Azharuddin | 94 | 4,346 | 48.83 | 1984–2000 | |
| Number 6 | VVS Laxman | 67 | 2,760 | 50.18 | 1996–2012 | |
| Number 7 | MS Dhoni | 103 | 2,871 | 30.54 | 2005–2014 | |
| Number 8 | Ravichandran Ashwin | 85 | 2,006 | 25.71 | 2011–2024 | |
| Number 9 | Harbhajan Singh | 55 | 703 | 14.06 | 1998–2015 | |
| Number 10 | Bishen Bedi | 69 | 470 | 9.04 | 1966–1979 | |
| Number 11 | Zaheer Khan | 22 | 209 | 16.08 | 2000–2014 | |
Last updated: 6 February 2024.

=== Most runs against each team ===
| Opposition | Runs | Player | Matches | Innings | Period | Ref |
|---|---|---|---|---|---|---|
| Afghanistan | 154 | KL Rahul† | 2 | 2 | 2018–2026 | |
| Australia | 3,630 | Sachin Tendulkar | 39 | 74 | 1991–2013 | |
| Bangladesh | 820 | Sachin Tendulkar | 7 | 9 | 2000–2010 | |
| England | 2,535 | Sachin Tendulkar | 32 | 53 | 1990–2012 | |
| Ireland | Yet to play | | | | | |
| New Zealand | 1,659 | Rahul Dravid | 15 | 28 | 1998–2010 | |
| Pakistan | 2,089 | Sunil Gavaskar | 24 | 41 | 1978–1987 | |
| South Africa | 1,741 | Sachin Tendulkar | 25 | 45 | 1992–2011 | |
| Sri Lanka | 1,995 | Sachin Tendulkar | 25 | 36 | 1990–2010 | |
| West Indies | 2,749 | Sunil Gavaskar | 27 | 48 | 1971–1983 | |
| Zimbabwe | 979 | Rahul Dravid | 9 | 13 | 1998–2005 | |
Last updated: 8 June 2026.

=== Highest individual score ===
The first test of the South Africa's tour of India in 2008 saw Virender Sehwag score his second triple century and record India's highest Individual score.

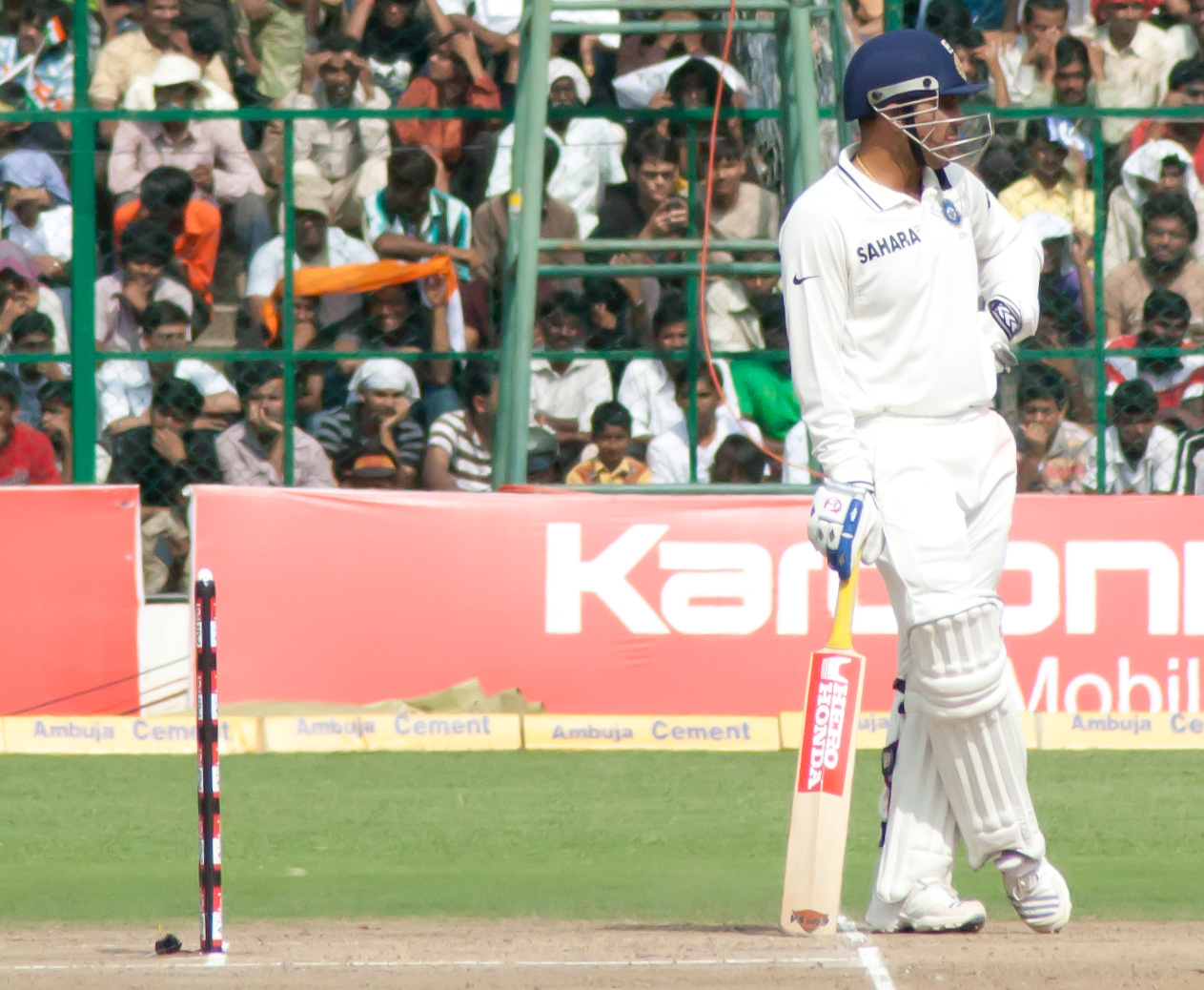
Virender Sehwag holds the top two highest individual score for India.

| Rank | Runs | Player | Opposition | Venue | Date |
|---|---|---|---|---|---|
| 1 | 319 | Virender Sehwag | South Africa | M. A. Chidambaram Stadium, Chennai, India | 26 March 2008 |
| 2 | 309 | Virender Sehwag | Pakistan | Multan Cricket Stadium, Multan, Pakistan | 28 March 2004 |
| 3 | 303* | Karun Nair | England | M. A. Chidambaram Stadium, Chennai, India | 16 December 2016 |
| 4 | 293 | Virender Sehwag | Sri Lanka | Brabourne Stadium, Mumbai, India | 2 December 2009 |
| 5 | 281 | VVS Laxman | Australia | Eden Gardens, Kolkata, India | 11 March 2001 |
Last updated: 20 June 2020

=== Highest individual score – progression of record ===
| Runs | Player | Opponent | Venue | Season |
|---|---|---|---|---|
| 118 | Lala Amarnath | England | Bombay Gymkhana, Mumbai, India | 1933–34 |
| 128 | Vijay Merchant | England | Kennington Oval, London, England | 1946 |
| 145 | Vijay Hazare | Australia | Adelaide Oval, Adelaide, Australia | 1947–48 |
| 164* | Vijay Hazare | England | Feroz Shah Kotla Ground, Delhi, India | 1951–52 |
| 184 | Vinoo Mankad | England | Lord's, London, England | 1952 |
| 223 | Polly Umrigar | New Zealand | Lal Bahadur Shastri Stadium, Hyderabad, India | 1955–56 |
| 231 | Vinoo Mankad | New Zealand | Jawaharlal Nehru Stadium, Chennai, India | 1955–56 |
| 236* | Sunil Gavaskar | West Indies | MA Chidambaram Stadium, Chennai, India | 1983–84 |
| 281 | VVS Laxman | Australia | Eden Gardens, Kolkata, India | 2000–01 |
| 309 | Virender Sehwag | Pakistan | Multan Cricket Stadium, Multan, Pakistan | 2003–04 |
| 319 | Virender Sehwag | South Africa | MA Chidambaram Stadium, Chennai, India | 2007–08 |
Last updated: 20 June 2020

=== Highest individual score against each team ===
| Opposition | Runs | Player | Venue | Date | Ref |
|---|---|---|---|---|---|
| Afghanistan | 126 | Shubman Gill | Maharaja Yadavindra Singh International Cricket Stadium,New Chandigarh, India | 6 June 2026 | |
| Australia | 281 | VVS Laxman | Eden Gardens, Kolkata, India | 11 March 2001 | |
| Bangladesh | 248* | Sachin Tendulkar | Bangabandhu National Stadium, Dhaka, Bangladesh | 10 December 2004 | |
| England | 303* | Karun Nair | M. A. Chidambaram Stadium, Chennai, India | 16 December 2016 | |
| Ireland | YTP | | | | |
| New Zealand | 231 | Vinoo Mankad | Nehru Stadium, Chennai, India | 6 January 1956 | |
| Pakistan | 309 | Virender Sehwag | Rawalpindi Cricket Stadium, Rawalpindi, Pakistan | 28 March 2004 | |
| South Africa | 319 | Virender Sehwag | M. A. Chidambaram Stadium, Chennai, India | 26 March 2008 | |
| Sri Lanka | 293 | Virender Sehwag | Brabourne Stadium, Mumbai, India | 2 December 2009 | |
| West Indies | 236* | Sunil Gavaskar | M. A. Chidambaram Stadium, Chennai, India | 24 December 1983 | |
| Zimbabwe | 227 | Vinod Kambli | Arun Jaitley Stadium, Delhi, India | 13 March 1993 | |
Last updated: 20 June 2020

=== Highest career average ===
A batsman's batting average is the total number of runs they have scored divided by the number of times they have been dismissed.

| Rank | Average | Player | Innings | Runs | Not out | 100 | 50 | Period |
|---|---|---|---|---|---|---|---|---|
| 1 | 54.20 | Vinod Kambli | 21 | 1,084 | 1 | 4 | 3 | 1993–1995 |
| 2 | 53.78 | Sachin Tendulkar | 329 | 15,921 | 33 | 51 | 68 | 1996-2012 |
| 3 | 52.63 | Rahul Dravid | 284 | 13,265 | 32 | 36 | 63 | 1996–2012 |
| 4 | 51.12 | Sunil Gavaskar | 214 | 10,122 | 16 | 34 | 45 | 1971–1987 |
| 5 | 49.43 | Virender Sehwag | 178 | 8,503 | 6 | 23 | 31 | 2001–2013 |
Qualification: 20 innings. Last updated: 26 November 2025

=== Highest average in each batting position ===
| Batting position | Batsman | Innings | Runs | Average | Career Span | Ref |
|---|---|---|---|---|---|---|
| Opener | Sunil Gavaskar | 203 | 9,607 | 50.29 | 1971–1987 | |
| Number 3 | Rahul Dravid | 217 | 10,501 | 53.30 | 1996–2012 | |
| Number 4 | Sourav Ganguly | 20 | 1,188 | 66.00 | 1996–2008 | |
| Number 5 | Sachin Tendulkar | 29 | 1,552 | 59.69 | 1993–2012 | |
| Number 6 | MS Dhoni | 25 | 1,218 | 55.36 | 2006–2014 | |
| Number 7 | Ravindra Jadeja† | 52 | 1,600 | 36.36 | 2012–2026 | |
| Number 8 | Ravindra Jadeja† | 32 | 924 | 34.22 | 2013–2024 | |
| Number 9 | Karsan Ghavri | 22 | 377 | 31.41 | 1975–1981 | |
| Number 10 | Anil Kumble | 22 | 235 | 15.66 | 1990–2008 | |
| Number 11 | Zaheer Khan | 21 | 210 | 17.50 | 2000–2014 | |
Qualification: Min 20 innings batted at position Last updated: 19 August 2026

=== Most half-centuries ===
A half-century is a score of between 50 and 99 runs. Statistically, once a batsman's score reaches 100, it is no longer considered a half-century but a century.

Sachin Tendulkar of India has scored the most half-centuries in Test cricket with 68. He is followed by the West Indies' Shivnarine Chanderpaul on 66, India's Rahul Dravid and Allan Border of Australia on 63 and in fifth with 62 fifties to his name, Australia's Ricky Ponting.

| Rank | Half centuries | Player | Innings | Runs | Period |
|---|---|---|---|---|---|
| 1 | 68 ♠ | Sachin Tendulkar | 329 | 15,921 | 1989–2013 |
| 2 | 63 | Rahul Dravid | 284 | 13,625 | 1996–2012 |
| 3 | 56 | VVS Laxman | 225 | 8,781 | 1996–2012 |
| 4 | 45 | Sunil Gavaskar | 214 | 10,122 | 1971–1987 |
| 5 | 35 | Gundappa Viswanath | 155 | 6,080 | 1969–1983 |
| 5 | 35 | Cheteshwar Pujara | 176 | 7,195 | 2010–2023 |
| 5 | 35 | Dilip Vengsarkar | 185 | 6,868 | 1976–1992 |
| 5 | 35 | Sourav Ganguly | 188 | 7,212 | 1996–2008 |
Last updated: 12 June 2023

=== Most centuries ===
A century is a score of 100 or more runs in a single innings.

Tendulkar has also scored the most centuries in Test cricket with 51. South Africa's Jacques Kallis is next on 45 and Ricky Ponting with 41 hundreds is in third.

| Rank | Centuries | Player | Innings | Runs | Period |
|---|---|---|---|---|---|
| 1 | 51 | Sachin Tendulkar | 329 | 15,921 | 1989–2013 |
| 2 | 36 | Rahul Dravid | 284 | 13,265 | 1996–2012 |
| 3 | 34 | Sunil Gavaskar | 214 | 10,122 | 1971–1987 |
| 4 | 30 | Virat Kohli | 210 | 9,230 | 2011–2025 |
| 5 | 23 | Virender Sehwag | 178 | 8,503 | 2001–2013 |
Last updated: 24 November 2024

=== Most double centuries ===
A double century is a score of 200 or more runs in a single innings.

For the most double centuries, Don Bradman holds the Test record scored with twelve, one ahead of Sri Lanka's Kumar Sangakkara who finished his career with eleven. In third is Brian Lara of the West Indies with nine. India's Virat Kohli is one of three cricketers who reached the mark on seven occasions.

| Rank | Double centuries | Player | Innings | Runs | Period |
|---|---|---|---|---|---|
| 1 | 7 | Virat Kohli | 210 | 9,230 | 2011–2025 |
| 2 | 6 | Virender Sehwag | 178 | 8,503 | 2001–2013 |
| 2 | 6 | Sachin Tendulkar | 329 | 15,921 | 1989–2013 |
| 4 | 5 | Rahul Dravid | 284 | 13,265 | 1996–2012 |
| 5 | 4 | Sunil Gavaskar | 214 | 10,122 | 1971–1987 |
Last updated: 12 June 2023

=== Most triple centuries ===
A triple century is a score of 300 or more runs in a single innings.

Sehwag holds the equal Test record for the most triple centuries scored with two, along with Australia's Don Bradman and West Indians Chris Gayle and Brian Lara. Karun Nair is the only other Indian who has scored a single Test triple century as of January 2020.

| Rank | Triple centuries | Player | Innings | Runs | Period |
|---|---|---|---|---|---|
| 1 | 2 ♠ | Virender Sehwag | 178 | 8,503 | 2001–2013 |
| 2 | 1 | Karun Nair | 12 | 491 | 2016–2025 |
Last updated: 3 July 2025

=== Most Sixes ===
| Rank | Sixes | Player | Innings | Period |
|---|---|---|---|---|
| 1 | 108 | Rishabh Pant† | 91 | 2018–2026 |
| 2 | 90 | Virender Sehwag | 178 | 2001–2013 |
| 3 | 88 | Rohit Sharma | 116 | 2013–2024 |
| 4 | 82 | Ravindra Jadeja† | 135 | 2012–2025 |
| 5 | 78 | MS Dhoni | 144 | 2005–2014 |
Last updated: 22 November 2026

=== Most Fours ===
| Rank | Fours | Player | Innings | Runs | Period |
|---|---|---|---|---|---|
| 1 | 2,058+ ♠ | Sachin Tendulkar | 329 | 15,921 | 1989–2013 |
| 2 | 1,651 | Rahul Dravid | 284 | 13,265 | 1996–2012 |
| 3 | 1,219 | Virender Sehwag | 178 | 8,503 | 2001–2013 |
| 4 | 1,135 | VVS Laxman | 225 | 8,781 | 1996–2012 |
| 5 | 1,027 | Virat Kohli | 210 | 9,230 | 2011-2025 |
Last updated: 5 January 2025

=== Highest batting strike rate ===
| Rank | Strike Rate | Player | Runs | Balls | Period |
|---|---|---|---|---|---|
| 1 | 82.18 | Virender Sehwag | 8,503 | 10,346 | 2001–2013 |
| 2 | 80.91 | Kapil Dev | 5,248 | 5,538+ | 1978–1994 |
| 3 | 74.62 | Mohammed Shami | 750 | 1,005 | 2018–2023 |
| 4 | 74.43 | Rishabh Pant† | 3,853 | 5,176 | 2018–2026 |
| 5 | 67.13 | Yashasvi Jaiswal† | 2,697 | 4,017 | 2023–2026 |
Qualification: 1,000 balls. Last updated: 19 November 2026

=== Most runs in a series ===
| Rank | Runs | Player | Matches | Innings | Series |
|---|---|---|---|---|---|
| 1 | 774 | Sunil Gavaskar | 4 | 8 | Indian cricket team in the West Indies in 1970–71 |
| 2 | 754 | Shubman Gill | 5 | 10 | Anderson–Tendulkar Trophy 2025 |
| 3 | 732 | Sunil Gavaskar | 6 | 9 | West Indies in India in 1978 |
| 4 | 712 | Yashasvi Jaiswal | 5 | 9 | Anthony de Mello Trophy 2024 |
| 5 | 692 | Virat Kohli | 4 | 8 | Border-Gavaskar Trophy in 2014 |
Last updated: 4 August 2025

=== Most career ducks ===
A duck refers to a batsman being dismissed without scoring a run.

| Rank | Ducks | Player | Matches | Innings | Period |
|---|---|---|---|---|---|
| 1 | 34 | Ishant Sharma | 105 | 142 | 2007–2021 |
| 2 | 29 | Zaheer Khan | 92 | 127 | 2000–2014 |
| 3 | 28 | Jasprit Bumrah† | 48 | 74 | 2018–2025 |
| 4 | 23 | B. S. Chandrasekhar | 58 | 80 | 1964–1979 |
| 5 | 20 | Bishan Bedi | 67 | 101 | 1966–1979 |
Last updated: 27 October 2024

== Bowling records ==
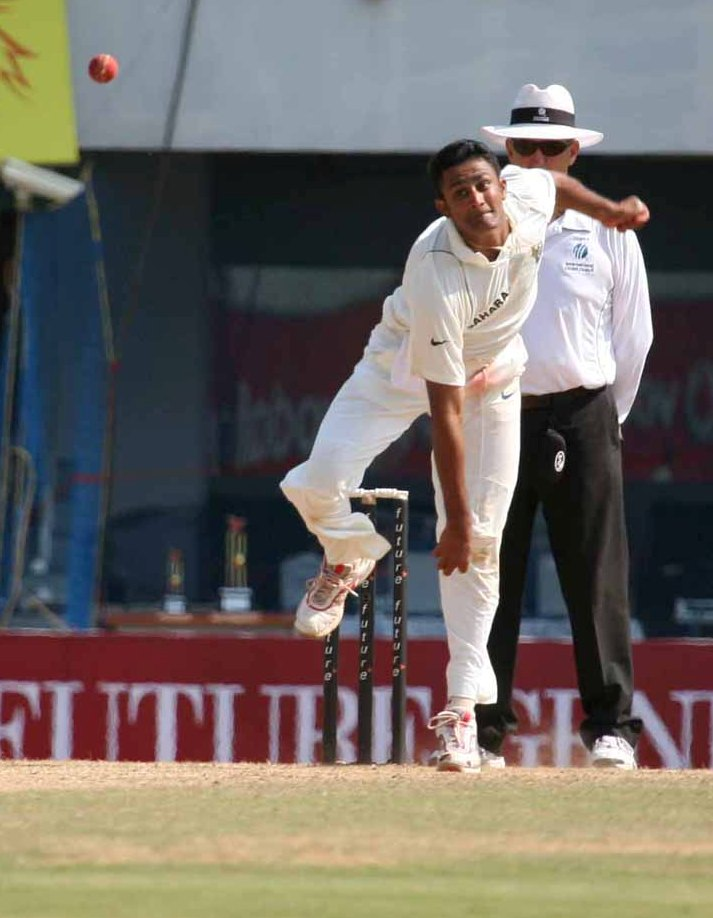
Anil Kumble has taken the most Test wickets (619), second most five-wicket hauls (35) and the most ten-wicket hauls (8) for India.

=== Most career wickets ===
A bowler takes the wicket of a batsman when the form of dismissal is bowled, caught, leg before wicket, stumped or hit wicket. If the batsman is dismissed by run out, obstructing the field, handling the ball, hitting the ball twice or timed out the bowler does not receive credit.

Shane Warne held the record for the most Test wickets with 708 until December 2007 when Sri Lankan bowler Muttiah Muralitharan passed Warne's milestone. Muralitharan, who continued to play until 2010, finished with 800 wickets to his name. James Anderson of England is third on the list taking 700 wickets holds the record for most wickets by a fast bowler in Test cricket. India's Anil Kumble is fourth on the list and the highest ranked Indian bowler taking 619 wickets.

| Rank | Wickets | Player | Matches | Innings | Average | Period |
|---|---|---|---|---|---|---|
| 1 | 619 | Anil Kumble | 132 | 236 | 29.65 | 1990–2008 |
| 2 | 537 | Ravichandran Ashwin | 106 | 200 | 24.00 | 2011–2024 |
| 3 | 434 | Kapil Dev | 131 | 227 | 29.64 | 1978–1994 |
| 4 | 417 | Harbhajan Singh | 103 | 190 | 32.46 | 1998–2015 |
| 5 | 356 | Ravindra Jadeja† | 91 | 171 | 25.30 | 2012–2026 |
| 6 | 311 | Ishant Sharma | 105 | 188 | 32.40 | 2007–2021 |
| 6 | 311 | Zaheer Khan | 92 | 165 | 32.94 | 2000–2014 |
| 8 | 266 | Bishan Singh Bedi | 67 | 118 | 28.71 | 1966–1979 |
| 9 | 242 | B.S. Chandrashekhar | 58 | 97 | 29.74 | 1964–1979 |
| 10 | 238 | Jasprit Bumrah | 53 | 100 | 19.75 | 2018–2026 |
Last updated: 12 October 2025

=== Most wickets against each team ===
| Opposition | Wickets | Player | Matches | Innings | Average | Period | Ref |
|---|---|---|---|---|---|---|---|
| Afghanistan | 7 | Manav Suthar | 1 | 2 | 8.85 | 2026–2026 | |
| Australia | 115 | Ravichandran Ashwin | 23 | 43 | 28.58 | 2011–2024 | |
| Bangladesh | 31 | Zaheer Khan | 7 | 14 | 24.25 | 2000–2010 | |
| England | 114 | Ravichandran Ashwin | 24 | 45 | 27.72 | 2012–2024 | |
| Ireland | YTP | | | | | | |
| New Zealand | 75 | Ravichandran Ashwin | 12 | 23 | 18.53 | 2012–2024 | |
| Pakistan | 99 | Kapil Dev | 29 | 45 | 30.12 | 1978–1989 | |
| South Africa | 84 | Anil Kumble | 21 | 40 | 31.79 | 1992–2008 | |
| Sri Lanka | 74 | Anil Kumble | 18 | 28 | 31.20 | 1993–2008 | |
| West Indies | 89 | Kapil Dev | 25 | 41 | 24.89 | 1978–1989 | |
| Zimbabwe | 38 | Anil Kumble | 7 | 14 | 22.60 | 1992–2005 | |
Last updated: 6 March 2024

=== Fastest wicket taker ===
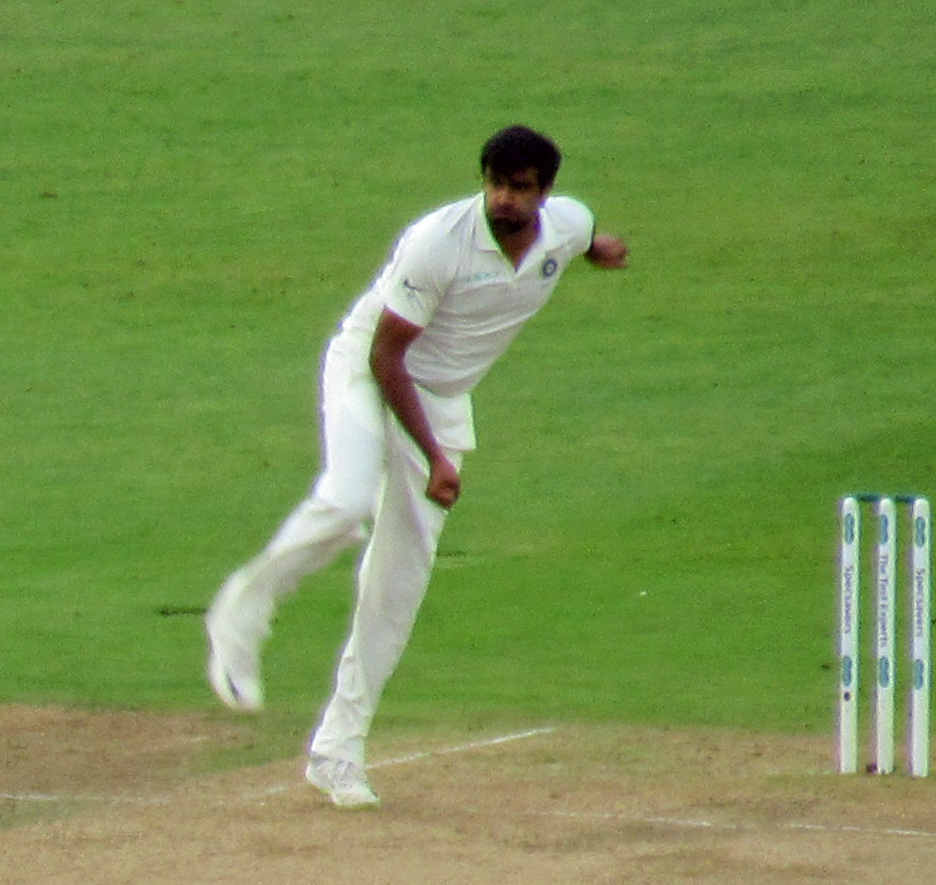
Ravichandran Ashwin holds world record for quickest to reach 250, 300 and 350 test wickets.

| Wickets | Bowler | Match | Record Date | Reference |
|---|---|---|---|---|
| 50 | Ravichandran Ashwin | 9 | 15 November 2012 | |
| 100 | Ravichandran Ashwin | 18 | 14 November 2013 | |
| 150 | Ravichandran Ashwin | 29 | 5 November 2015 | |
| 200 | Ravichandran Ashwin | 37 | 22 September 2016 | |
| 250 | Ravichandran Ashwin | 45 ♠ | 9 February 2017 | |
| 300 | Ravichandran Ashwin | 54 ♠ | 24 November 2017 | |
| 350 | Ravichandran Ashwin | 66 ♠ | 2 October 2019 | |
| 400 | Ravichandran Ashwin | 77 | 24 February 2021 | |
| 450 | Ravichandran Ashwin | 89 | 9 February 2023 | |
| 500 | Ravichandran Ashwin | 98 | 16 February 2024 | |
| 600 | Anil Kumble | 124 | 16 January 2008 | |
Last updated: 20 June 2020

=== Best figures in an innings ===
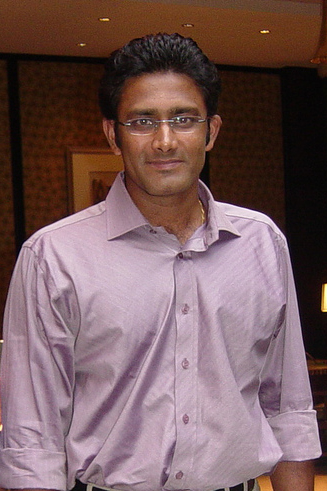
Anil Kumble is one of three players to have taken 10 wickets in an innings.

Bowling figures refers to the number of the wickets a bowler has taken and the number of runs conceded. There have been three occasions in Test cricket where a bowler has taken all ten wickets in a single innings – Jim Laker of England took 10/53 against Australia in 1956, India's Anil Kumble in 1999 returned figures of 10/74 against Pakistan, New Zealand's Ajaz Patel in 2021 obtained figures of 10/119 against India. Subhash Gupte, Jasu Patel and Kapil Dev are three Indian bowlers of 15 bowlers who have taken nine wickets in a Test match innings.

| Rank | Figures | Player | Opposition | Venue | Date |
|---|---|---|---|---|---|
| 1 | 10/74 | Anil Kumble | Pakistan | Arun Jaitley Stadium, Delhi, India | 4 February 1999 |
| 2 | 9/69 | Jasu Patel | Australia | Green Park, Kanpur, India | 19 December 1959 |
| 3 | 9/83 | Kapil Dev | West Indies | Sardar Patel Stadium, Ahmedabad, India | 12 November 1983 |
| 4 | 9/102 | Subhash Gupte | West Indies | Green Park, Kanpur, India | 12 December 1958 |
| 5 | 8/52 | Vinoo Mankad | Pakistan | Arun Jaitley Stadium, Delhi, India | 16 October 1952 |
Last updated: 20 June 2020

=== Best bowling figures against each team ===
| Opposition | Figures | Player | Venue | Date | Ref |
|---|---|---|---|---|---|
| Afghanistan | 6/33 | Manav Suthar | Maharaja Yadavindra Singh International Cricket Stadium, New Chandigarh, India | 06 June 2026 | |
| Australia | 9/69 | Jasu Patel | Green Park, Kanpur, India | 19 December 1959 | |
| Bangladesh | 7/87 | Zaheer Khan | Sher-e-Bangla National Stadium, Mirpur, Bangladesh | 24 January 2010 | |
| England | 8/55 | Vinoo Mankad | M. A. Chidambaram Stadium, Chennai, India | 6 February 1952 | |
| Ireland | YTP | | | | |
| New Zealand | 8/72 | Srinivasaraghavan Venkataraghavan | Arun Jaitley Stadium, Delhi, India | 19 March 1965 | |
| Pakistan | 10/74 | Anil Kumble | Arun Jaitley Stadium, Delhi, India | 4 February 1999 | |
| South Africa | 7/61 | Shardul Thakur | Wanderers Stadium, Johannesburg, South Africa | 3 January 2022 | |
| Sri Lanka | 7/51 | Maninder Singh | Vidarbha Cricket Association Ground, Nagpur, India | 27 December 1986 | |
| West Indies | 9/83 | Kapil Dev | Sardar Patel Stadium, Ahmedabad, India | 12 November 1983 | |
| Zimbabwe | 7/59 | Irfan Pathan | Harare Sports Club, Harare, Zimbabwe | 20 September 2005 | |
Last updated: 7 January 2022

=== Best figures in a match ===
A bowler's bowling figures in a match is the sum of the wickets taken and the runs conceded over both innings.

No bowler in the history of Test cricket has taken all 20 wickets in a match. The closest to do so was English spin bowler Jim Laker. During the fourth Test of the 1956 Ashes series, Laker took 9/37 in the first innings and 10/53 in the second to finish with match figures of 19/90. Narendra Hirwani's figures of 16/136, taken in his debut test, during the fourth match of the West Indies tour of India in 1987, is the third-best in Test cricket history.

| Rank | Figures | Player | Opposition | Venue | Date |
|---|---|---|---|---|---|
| 1 | 16/136 | Narendra Hirwani | West Indies | M. A. Chidambaram Stadium, Chennai, India | 11 January 1988 |
| 2 | 15/217 | Harbhajan Singh | Australia | M. A. Chidambaram Stadium, Chennai, India | 18 March 2001 |
| 3 | 14/124 | Jasu Patel | Australia | Green Park, Kanpur, India | 19 December 1959 |
| 4 | 14/149 | Anil Kumble | Pakistan | Arun Jaitley Stadium, Delhi, India | 4 February 1999 |
| 5 | 13/131 | Vinoo Mankad | Pakistan | Arun Jaitley Stadium, Delhi, India | 16 October 1952 |
Last updated: 20 June 2020

=== Best career average ===
A bowler's bowling average is the total number of runs they have conceded divided by the number of wickets they have taken. 19th-century English medium pacer George Lohmann holds the record for the best career average in Test cricket with 10.75.

| Rank | Average | Player | Wickets | Runs | Balls | Period |
|---|---|---|---|---|---|---|
| 1 | 19.66 | Axar Patel† | 57 | 1,121 | 2,660 | 2021–2025 |
| 2 | 19.84 | Jasprit Bumrah† | 238 | 4,631 | 10,031 | 2018–2025 |
| 3 | 23.36 | Kuldeep Yadav† | 80 | 1,869 | 3,150 | 2017–2025 |
| 4 | 24.00 | Ravichandran Ashwin | 537 | 12,891 | 27,246 | 2011–2024 |
| 5 | 25.30 | Ravindra Jadeja† | 356 | 8,741 | 20,241 | 2012–2026 |
Qualification: 2,000 balls. Last updated: 26 November 2025

=== Best career economy rate ===
A bowler's economy rate is the total number of runs they have conceded divided by the number of overs they have bowled. English bowler William Attewell, who played 10 matches for England between 1884 and 1892, holds the Test record for the best career economy rate with 1.31. India's Bapu Nadkarni, with a rate of 1.67 runs per over conceded over his 41-match Test career, is fourth on the list.

| Rank | Economy rate | Player | Wickets | Runs | Balls | Period |
|---|---|---|---|---|---|---|
| 1 | 1.67 | Bapu Nadkarni | 88 | 2,559 | 9,165 | 1955–1968 |
| 2 | 1.87 | Polly Umrigar | 35 | 1,473 | 4,725 | 1948–1962 |
| 3 | 2.09 | Lala Amarnath | 45 | 1,481 | 4,241 | 1933–1952 |
| 4 | 2.13 | Vinoo Mankad | 162 | 5,236 | 14,686 | 1946–1959 |
| 5 | 2.14 | Bishan Singh Bedi | 266 | 7,637 | 21,364 | 1966–1979 |
Qualification: 2,000 balls. Last updated: 20 June 2020

=== Best career strike rate ===
A bowler's strike rate is the total number of balls they have bowled divided by the number of wickets they have taken. As with the career average above, the top bowler with the best Test career strike rate is George Lohmann with strike rate of 34.1 balls per wicket. India's Kuldeep Yadav is the highest-ranked Indian bowler on this list.

| Rank | Strike rate | Player | Wickets | Runs | Balls | Period |
|---|---|---|---|---|---|---|
| 1 | 38.06 | Kuldeep Yadav† | 80 | 1,704 | 2,893 | 2017–2025 |
| 2 | 42.86 | Jasprit Bumrah† | 238 | 4,631 | 10,031 | 2018–2025 |
| 3 | 46.66 | Axar Patel† | 57 | 1,121 | 2,660 | 2021–2025 |
| 4 | 50.28 | Mohammed Shami† | 229 | 6,346 | 11,515 | 2013–2023 |
| 5 | 50.41 | Mohammed Siraj† | 139 | 4,124 | 7,007 | 2020–2025 |
Qualification: 2,000 balls. Last updated: 26 November 2025

=== Most five-wicket hauls in an innings ===
A five-wicket haul refers to a bowler taking five wickets in a single innings. Ravichandran Ashwin is fourth on the list of most five-wicket hauls behind Sri Lanka's Muttiah Muralitharan, Australia's Shane Warne and New Zealand's Richard Hadlee in Test cricket.

| Rank | Five-wicket hauls | Player | Match | Innings | Wickets | Period |
|---|---|---|---|---|---|---|
| 1 | 37 | Ravichandran Ashwin | 105 | 199 | 536 | 2011–2024 |
| 2 | 35 | Anil Kumble | 132 | 236 | 619 | 1990–2008 |
| 3 | 25 | Harbhajan Singh | 103 | 190 | 417 | 1998–2015 |
| 4 | 23 | Kapil Dev | 131 | 227 | 434 | 1978–1994 |
| 5 | 16 | B. S. Chandrasekhar | 58 | 97 | 242 | 1964–1979 |
| 5 | 16 | Jasprit Bumrah | 53 | 100 | 238 | 2018–2026 |
Last updated: 25 November 2025

=== Most ten-wicket hauls in a match ===
A ten-wicket haul refers to a bowler taking ten or more wickets in a match over two innings. As with the five-wicket hauls above, Anil Kumble is not only behind Muralitharan, Warne and Hadlee, he is also behind Rangana Herath of Sri Lanka in taking the most ten-wicket hauls in Test cricket.

| Rank | Ten-wicket hauls | Player | Matches | Innings | Wickets | Period |
|---|---|---|---|---|---|---|
| 1 | 8 | Ravichandran Ashwin | 106 | 200 | 537 | 2011–2024 |
| 1 | 8 | Anil Kumble | 132 | 236 | 619 | 1990–2008 |
| 3 | 5 | Harbhajan Singh | 103 | 190 | 417 | 1998–2015 |
| 4 | 3 | Ravindra Jadeja† | 91 | 171 | 356 | 2012–2026 |
| 5 | 2 | Irfan Pathan | 29 | 54 | 100 | 2003–2008 |
| 5 | 2 | Maninder Singh | 35 | 52 | 88 | 1982–1993 |
| 5 | 2 | Vinoo Mankad | 44 | 70 | 162 | 1946–1959 |
| 5 | 2 | E. A. S. Prasanna | 49 | 86 | 189 | 1962–1978 |
| 5 | 2 | B. S. Chandrasekhar | 58 | 97 | 242 | 1964–1979 |
| 5 | 2 | Kapil Dev | 131 | 227 | 434 | 1978–1994 |
Last updated: 1 November 2024

=== Worst figures in an innings ===
The worst figures in a single innings in Test cricket came in the third Test between the West Indies at home to Pakistan in 1958. Pakistan's Khan Mohammad returned figures of 0/259 from his 54 overs in the second innings of the match. The worst figures by an Indian is 0/187 that came off the bowling of E. A. S. Prasanna in the first test of the India's tour of England in 1967.

| Rank | Figures | Player | Overs | Opposition | Venue | Date |
|---|---|---|---|---|---|---|
| 1 | 0/187 | E. A. S. Prasanna | 59 | England | Headingley, Leeds, England | 8 June 1967 |
| 2 | 0/182 | Arshad Ayub | 49 | Pakistan | Gaddafi Stadium, Lahore, Pakistan | 1 December 1989 |
| 3 | 0/176 | Harbhajan Singh | 34 | Pakistan | Gaddafi Stadium, Lahore, Pakistan | 13 January 2006 |
| 4 | 0/173 | Dattu Phadkar | 43 | West Indies | Eden Gardens, Kolkata, India | 31 December 1958 |
| 5 | 0/170 | Amit Mishra | 38 | England | The Oval, London, England | 18 August 2011 |
Last updated: 20 June 2020

=== Worst figures in a match ===
The worst figures in a match in Test cricket were taken by South Africa's Imran Tahir in the second Test against Australia at the Adelaide Oval in November 2012. He returned figures of 0/180 from his 23 overs in the first innings and 0/80 off 14 in the third innings for a total of 0/260 from 37 overs. He claimed the record in his final over when two runs came from it – enough for him to pass the previous record of 0/259, set 54 years prior.

The worst figures by an Indian is by E. A. S. Prasanna in the first test of the India's tour of England in 1967.

| Rank | Figures | Player | Overs | Opposition | Venue | Date |
|---|---|---|---|---|---|---|
| 1 | 0/187 | E. A. S. Prasanna | 59 | England | Headingley, Leeds, England | 8 June 1967 |
| 2 | 0/182 | Arshad Ayub | 49 | Pakistan | Gaddafi Stadium, Lahore, Pakistan | 1 December 1989 |
| 3 | 0/180 | Arshad Ayub | 60 | West Indies | Eden Gardens, Kolkata, India | 26 December 1987 |
| 4 | 0/179 | Harbhajan Singh | 47 | Pakistan | Iqbal Stadium, Faisalabad, Pakistan | 21 January 2006 |
| 4 | 0/179 | Pankaj Singh | 47 | England | Rose Bowl, Southampton, England | 27 July 2014 |
Last updated:20 June 2020

=== Most wickets in a series ===
England's seventh Test tour of South Africa in 1913–14 saw the record set for the most wickets taken by a bowler in a Test series. English paceman Sydney Barnes played in four of the five matches and achieved a total of 49 wickets to his name. India's B. S. Chandrasekhar is joint 18th with his 35 wickets taken against England during the 1972–73 tour.

| Rank | Wickets | Player | Matches | Series |
|---|---|---|---|---|
| 1 | 35 | B. S. Chandrasekhar | 5 | English cricket team in India in 1972–73 |
| 2 | 34 | Vinoo Mankad | 5 | English cricket team in India in 1951–52 |
| 2 | 34 | Subhash Gupte | 5 | New Zealand cricket team in India in 1955–56 |
| 4 | 32 | Kapil Dev | 6 | Pakistani cricket team in India in 1979–80 |
| 4 | 32 | Harbhajan Singh | 3 | Border-Gavaskar Trophy in 2001 |
| 4 | 32 | Ravichandran Ashwin | 4 | Anthony de Mello Trophy in 2020-21 |
| 4 | 32 | Jasprit Bumrah | 5 | Border Gavaskar Trophy in 2024-25 |
Last updated: 12 May 2025

=== Hat-trick ===
In cricket, a hat-trick occurs when a bowler takes three wickets with consecutive deliveries. The deliveries may be interrupted by an over bowled by another bowler from the other end of the pitch or the other team's innings, but must be three consecutive deliveries by the individual bowler in the same match. Only wickets attributed to the bowler count towards a hat-trick; run outs do not count.

3 Indians have taken hat-tricks in Test cricket, Harbhajan Singh, Irfan Pathan, and Jasprit Bumrah.

| No. | Bowler | Against | Inn. | Test | Dismissals | Venue | Date | Ref. |
|---|---|---|---|---|---|---|---|---|
| 1 | Harbhajan Singh | Australia | 1 | 2/3 | Ricky Ponting (lbw); Adam Gilchrist (lbw); Shane Warne (c Sadagoppan Ramesh) | Eden Gardens, Calcutta, India | 11 March 2001 | |
| 2 | Irfan Pathan | Pakistan | 1 | 3/3 | Salman Butt (c Rahul Dravid); Younis Khan (lbw); Mohammad Yousuf (b) | National Stadium, Karachi, Pakistan | 29 January 2006 | |
| 3 | Jasprit Bumrah | West Indies | 1 | 2/2 | Darren Bravo (c KL Rahul); Shamarh Brooks (lbw); Roston Chase (lbw) | Sabina Park, Kingston, Jamaica | 31 August 2019 | |

== Wicket-keeping records ==
The wicket-keeper is a specialist fielder who stands behind the stumps being guarded by the batsman on strike and is the only member of the fielding side allowed to wear gloves and leg pads.

=== Most career dismissals ===
A wicket-keeper can be credited with the dismissal of a batsman in two ways, caught or stumped. A fair catch is taken when the ball is caught fully within the field of play without it bouncing after the ball has touched the striker's bat or glove holding the bat, while a stumping occurs when the wicket-keeper puts down the wicket while the batsman is out of his ground and not attempting a run. India's MS Dhoni is fifth in taking most dismissals in Test cricket as a designated wicket-keeper.

| Rank | Dismissals | Player | Matches | Innings | Catches | Stumping | Dis/Inn | Period |
|---|---|---|---|---|---|---|---|---|
| 1 | 294 | MS Dhoni | 90 | 166 | 256 | 38 | 1.771 | 2005–2014 |
| 2 | 198 | Syed Kirmani | 88 | 151 | 160 | 38 | 1.311 | 1976–1986 |
| 3 | 187 | Rishabh Pant† | 53 | 91 | 169 | 18 | 1.810 | 2018–2026 |
| 4 | 130 | Kiran More | 49 | 90 | 110 | 20 | 1.444 | 1986–1993 |
| 5 | 107 | Nayan Mongia | 44 | 77 | 99 | 8 | 1.389 | 1994–2001 |
Last updated: 19 August 2026

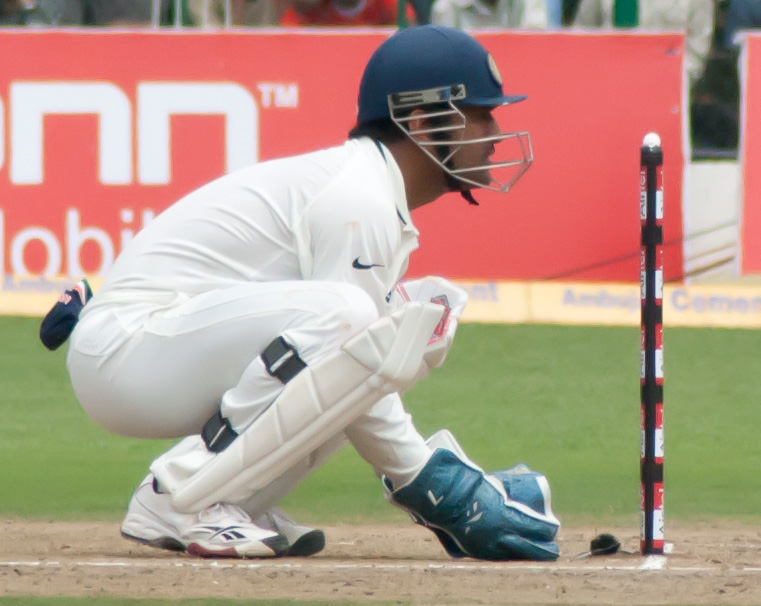
Mahendra Singh Dhoni holds the Indian record for most dismissals among wicket keepers.

=== Most career catches ===
Dhoni is seventh in taking most catches in Test cricket as a designated wicket-keeper.

| Rank | Catches | Player | Matches | Innings | Period |
|---|---|---|---|---|---|
| 1 | 256 | MS Dhoni | 90 | 166 | 2005–2014 |
| 2 | 169 | Rishabh Pant† | 53 | 91 | 2018–2026 |
| 3 | 160 | Syed Kirmani | 88 | 151 | 1976–1986 |
| 4 | 110 | Kiran More | 49 | 90 | 1986–1993 |
| 5 | 99 | Nayan Mongia | 44 | 77 | 1994–2001 |
Last updated: 19 August 2026

=== Most career stumpings ===
Bert Oldfield, Australia's fifth-most capped wicket-keeper, holds the record for the most stumpings in Test cricket with 52. Indian glovemen Syed Kirmani and MS Dhoni are both equal third on 38.

| Rank | Stumpings | Player | Matches | Innings | Period |
|---|---|---|---|---|---|
| 1 | 38 | Syed Kirmani | 88 | 151 | 1976–1986 |
| 1 | 38 | MS Dhoni | 90 | 166 | 2005–2014 |
| 3 | 20 | Kiran More | 49 | 90 | 1986–1993 |
| 4 | 18 | Rishabh Pant† | 53 | 91 | 2018–2026 |
| 5 | 16 | Naren Tamhane | 21 | 35 | 1955–1961 |
| 5 | 16 | Farokh Engineer | 46 | 83 | 1961–1975 |
Last updated: 19 August 2026

=== Most dismissals in an innings ===
Four wicket-keepers have taken seven dismissals in a single innings in a Test match—Wasim Bari of Pakistan in 1979, Englishman Bob Taylor in 1980, New Zealand's Ian Smith in 1991 and most recently West Indian gloveman Ridley Jacobs against Australia in 2000.

The feat of taking 6 dismissals in an innings has been achieved by 24 wicket-keepers on 32 occasions including 4 Indians.

| Rank | Dismissals | Player | Opposition | Venue | Date |
|---|---|---|---|---|---|
| 1 | 6 | Syed Kirmani | New Zealand | AMI Stadium, Christchurch, New Zealand | 5 February 1976 |
| 1 | 6 | MS Dhoni | New Zealand | Basin Reserve, Wellington, New Zealand | 3 April 2009 |
| 1 | 6 | Wriddhiman Saha | West Indies | Sir Vivian Richards Stadium, North Sound, Antigua | 21 July 2016 |
| 1 | 6 | Rishabh Pant | Australia | Adelaide Oval, Adelaide, Australia | 6 December 2018 |
Last updated: 20 June 2020

=== Most dismissals in a match ===
Three wicket-keepers have made 11 dismissals in a Test match, Englishman Jack Russell in 1995, South African AB de Villiers in 2013 and most recently India's Rishabh Pant against Australia in 2018.

The feat of making 10 dismissals in a match has been achieved by 4 wicket-keepers on 4 occasions with Wriddhiman Saha being the only Indian.

| Rank | Dismissals | Player | Opposition | Venue | Date |
|---|---|---|---|---|---|
| 1 | 11 ♠ | Rishabh Pant | Australia | Adelaide Oval, Adelaide, Australia | 6 December 2018 |
| 2 | 10 | Wriddhiman Saha | South Africa | Newlands, Cape Town, South Africa | 5 January 2018 |
| 3 | 9 | MS Dhoni | Australia | Melbourne Cricket Ground, Melbourne, Australia | 26 December 2014 |
| 3 | 9 | Rishabh Pant | Australia | The Gabba, Brisbane, Australia | 14 December 2024 |
| 5 | 8 | Nayan Mongia | South Africa | Kingsmead, Durban, South Africa | 26 December 1996 |
| 5 | 8 | Nayan Mongia | Pakistan | Eden Gardens, Kolkata, India | 16 February 1999 |
| 5 | 8 | MS Dhoni | Australia | WACA Ground, Perth, Australia | 16 January 2008 |
| 5 | 8 | MS Dhoni | Bangladesh | Sher-e-Bangla National Cricket Stadium, Mirpur, Bangladesh | 24 January 2010 |
| 5 | 8 | MS Dhoni | West Indies | Wankhede Stadium, Mumbai, India | 22 November 2011 |
Last updated: 19 December 2024

=== Most dismissals in a series ===
Brad Haddin holds the Test cricket record for the most dismissals taken by a wicket-keeper in a series. He took 29 catches during the 2013 Ashes series. Indian record is held by Rishabh Pant when he made 20 dismissals during the Border Gavaskar Trophy in Australia in 2018.

| Rank | Dismissals | Player | Matches | Innings | Series |
|---|---|---|---|---|---|
| 1 | 25 | Rishabh Pant | 5 | 10 | Border-Gavaskar Trophy in 2024-25 |
| 2 | 20 | Rishabh Pant | 4 | 8 | Border Gavaskar Trophy in Australia in 2018 |
| 3 | 19 | Naren Tamhane | 5 | 9 | Indian cricket team in Pakistan in 1954-55 |
| 3 | 19 | Syed Kirmani | 6 | 11 | Pakistani cricket team in India in 1979–80 |
| 5 | 18 | Rishabh Pant | 5 | 9 | Pataudi Trophy in 2021-2022 |
Last updated: 12 May 2025

== Fielding records ==
=== Most career catches ===
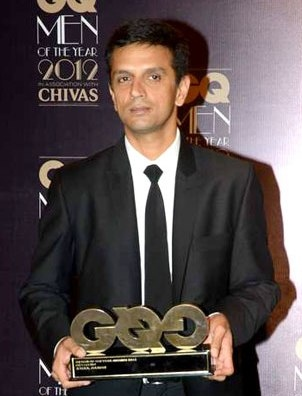
Rahul Dravid holds the world record most catches by a fielder in Test cricket.

Caught is one of the nine methods a batsman can be dismissed in cricket. (Note: In 2017, The Laws of Cricket were amended, reducing the methods of dismissals from ten to nine, with handled the ball now covered as part of obstructing the field.) The majority of catches are caught in the slips, located behind the batsman, next to the wicket-keeper, on the off side of the field. Most slip fielders are top order batsmen.

England's Joe Root holds the record for the most catches in Test cricket by a non-wicket-keeper with 213, followed by Rahul Dravid of India at 209 and Mahela Jayawardene of Sri Lanka on 205. Jacques Kallis is the highest ranked South African in fourth, securing 200 catches in his Test career.

| Rank | Catches | Player | Matches | Innings | Ct/Inn | Period |
|---|---|---|---|---|---|---|
| 1 | 209 | Rahul Dravid | 163 | 299 | 0.698 | 1996–2012 |
| 2 | 135 | VVS Laxman | 134 | 248 | 0.544 | 1996–2012 |
| 3 | 121 | Virat Kohli | 123 | 236 | 0.512 | 2011–2025 |
| 4 | 115 | Sachin Tendulkar | 200 | 366 | 0.314 | 1989–2013 |
| 5 | 108 | Sunil Gavaskar | 125 | 216 | 0.500 | 1971–1987 |
Last updated: 5 January 2025

=== Most catches in a series ===
The 1920–21 Ashes series, in which Australia whitewashed England 5–0 for the first time, saw the record set for the most catches taken by a non-wicket-keeper in a Test series. Australian all-rounder Jack Gregory took 15 catches in the series as well as 23 wickets. Greg Chappell, a fellow Australian all-rounder, and India's KL Rahul are equal second behind Gregory with 14 catches taken during the 1974–75 Ashes series and during the 2018 Indian tour of England respectively. Four players have taken 13 catches in a series on six occasions with both Bob Simpson and Brian Lara having done so twice and Rahul Dravid and Alastair Cook once.

| Rank | Catches | Player | Matches | Innings | Series |
|---|---|---|---|---|---|
| 1 | 14 | KL Rahul† | 5 | 9 | Pataudi Trophy in 2018 |
| 2 | 13 | Rahul Dravid | 4 | 8 | Australian cricket team in India in 2004-05 |
| 3 | 12 | Eknath Solkar | 5 | 9 | English cricket team in India in 1972-73 |
| 4 | 10 | Ajit Wadekar | 4 | 8 | Indian cricket team in New Zealand in 1967–68 |
| 4 | 10 | Eknath Solkar | 4 | 8 | Australian cricket team in India in 1969–70 |
| 4 | 10 | Mohammad Azharuddin | 3 | 6 | Sri Lankan cricket team in India in 1993-94 |
| 4 | 10 | Rahul Dravid | 4 | 7 | Indian cricket team in England in 2002 |
| 4 | 10 | Ajinkya Rahane | 3 | 6 | Indian cricket team in Sri Lanka in 2015 |
| 4 | 10 | Ajinkya Rahane | 4 | 7 | South African cricket team in India in 2015-16 |
Last updated: 20 June 2020

== All-round Records ==
=== 1000 runs and 100 wickets ===
A total of 71 players have achieved the double of 1000 runs and 100 wickets in their Test career.

| Rank | Player | Average Difference | Matches | Runs | Bat Avg | Wickets | Bowl Avg | Period |
|---|---|---|---|---|---|---|---|---|
| 1 | Ravindra Jadeja† | 12.50 | 91 | 4,190 | 37.80 | 356 | 25.30 | 2012–2026 |
| 2 | Ravichandran Ashwin | 1.75 | 106 | 3,503 | 25.75 | 537 | 24.00 | 2011–2024 |
| 3 | Kapil Dev | 1.40 | 131 | 5,248 | 31.05 | 434 | 29.64 | 1978–1994 |
| 4 | Irfan Pathan | -0.68 | 29 | 1,105 | 31.57 | 100 | 32.26 | 2003–2008 |
| 5 | Vinoo Mankad | -0.84 | 44 | 2,109 | 31.47 | 162 | 32.32 | 1946–1959 |
| 6 | Ravi Shastri | -5.16 | 80 | 3,830 | 35.79 | 151 | 40.96 | 1981–1992 |
| 7 | Anil Kumble | -11.87 | 132 | 2,506 | 17.77 | 619 | 29.65 | 1990–2008 |
| 8 | Harbhajan Singh | -14.23 | 103 | 2,224 | 18.22 | 417 | 32.46 | 1998–2015 |
| 9 | Javagal Srinath | -16.28 | 67 | 1,009 | 14.21 | 236 | 30.49 | 1991–2002 |
| 10 | Zaheer Khan | -20.99 | 92 | 1,231 | 11.95 | 311 | 32.94 | 2000–2014 |
Last updated: 25 November 2025

=== Highest career average and 100wickets ===
A batsman's batting average is the total number of runs they have scored divided by the number of times they have been dismissed.

| Rank | Average | Player | Innings | Runs | Not out | 100 | 50 | wickets |
|---|---|---|---|---|---|---|---|---|
| 1 | 37.80 | Ravindra Jadeja | 136 | 4160 | 26 | 6 | 28 | 356 |
| 2 | 35.79 | Ravi Shastri | 121 | 3830 | 14 | 11 | 12 | 151 |
| 3 | 31.57 | Irfan Pathan | 40 | 1105 | 5 | 1 | 6 | 100 |
| 4 | 31.47 | Vinoo Mankad | 72 | 2109 | 5 | 5 | 6 | 162 |
| 5 | 31.05 | Kapil Dev | 184 | 5248 | 15 | 8 | 27 | 434 |
Qualification: 20 innings. Last updated: 26 November 2025

=== Most centuries and Most five-wicket hauls ===
A century and five wickets is a score of 100 or more runs and 5+wickets in a match

| Rank | time | Centuries | five-wicket hauls | Player | match |
|---|---|---|---|---|---|
| 1 | 4 | 5 | 37 | Ravichandran Ashwin | 106 |
| 2 | 2 | 6 | 15 | Ravindra Jadeja | 91 |
| 3 | 1 | 5 | 8 | Vinoo Mankad | 44 |
| 4 | 1 | 12 | 2 | Polly Umrigar | 59 |
Last updated: 24 November 2024

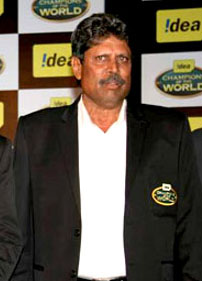
Kapil Dev is considered the greatest all-rounder for India.

== Other records ==
=== Most career matches ===
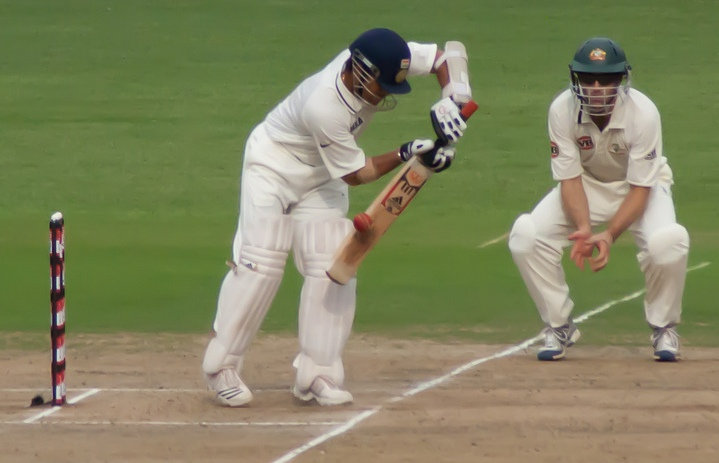
Tendulkar has played the Most Test Matches (200) Highest by any player.

India's Sachin Tendulkar holds the record for the most Test matches played with 200, with James Anderson at second with 188 matches and former captains Ricky Ponting and Steve Waugh being joint-third with each having represented Australia on 168 occasions.

| Rank | Matches | Player | Runs | Wkts | Period |
|---|---|---|---|---|---|
| 1 | 200 | Sachin Tendulkar ♠ | 15,921 | 46 | 1989–2013 |
| 2 | 163 | Rahul Dravid | 13,265 | 1 | 1996–2012 |
| 3 | 134 | VVS Laxman | 8,781 | 2 | 1996–2012 |
| 4 | 132 | Anil Kumble | 2,506 | 619 | 1990–2008 |
| 5 | 131 | Kapil Dev | 5,248 | 434 | 1978–1994 |
Last updated: 20 June 2020

=== Most consecutive career matches ===
Former English captain Alastair Cook holds the record for the most consecutive Test matches played with 159. He broke Allan Border's long standing record of 153 matches in June 2018. Sunil Gavaskar, the Indian opener played 106 consecutive Test matches, is fourth. The recently retired New Zealand wicket-keeper-batsman Brendon McCullum, who is fifth on the list with 101 matches, is the highest ranked cricketer who never missed a Test match during his playing career. Rahul Dravid, in ninth on 93, is the highest ranked Indian player to achieve the feat.

| Rank | Matches | Player | Period |
|---|---|---|---|
| 1 | 106 | Sunil Gavaskar | 1975–1987 |
| 2 | 93 | Rahul Dravid | 1996–2005 |
| 3 | 87 | Gundappa Viswanath | 1971–1983 |
| 4 | 84 | Sachin Tendulkar | 1989–2001 |
| 5 | 69 | Mohammad Azharuddin | 1989–1999 |
Last updated: 3 June 2018

=== Most matches as captain ===
Graeme Smith, who led the South African cricket team from 2003 to 2014, holds the record for the most matches played as captain in Test cricket with 109. Virat Kohli who led the side for seven years from 2014 to 2022 is sixth on the list with 68 matches.

| Rank | Matches | Player | Won | Lost | Tied | Draw | %Won | %Lost | Period |
|---|---|---|---|---|---|---|---|---|---|
| 1 | 68 | Virat Kohli | 40 | 17 | 0 | 11 | 58.82 | 25 | 2014–2022 |
| 2 | 60 | MS Dhoni | 27 | 18 | 0 | 15 | 45 | 30 | 2008–2014 |
| 3 | 49 | Sourav Ganguly | 21 | 13 | 0 | 15 | 42.85 | 26.53 | 2000–2005 |
| 4 | 47 | Mohammad Azharuddin | 14 | 14 | 0 | 19 | 29.78 | 29.78 | 1990–1999 |
| 4 | 47 | Sunil Gavaskar | 9 | 8 | 0 | 30 | 19.14 | 17.02 | 1976–1985 |
Last updated: 14 January 2022

=== Most wins as captain ===
Graeme Smith, who led the South African cricket team from 2003 to 2014, holds the record for the most wins as captain in Test cricket with 53.

| Rank | Wins | Matches | Player | Period |
|---|---|---|---|---|
| 1 | 40 | 68 | Virat Kohli | 2014–2022 |
| 2 | 27 | 60 | MS Dhoni | 2008–2014 |
| 3 | 21 | 49 | Sourav Ganguly | 2000–2005 |
| 4 | 14 | 47 | Mohammad Azharuddin | 1990–1999 |
| 5 | 12 | 24 | Rohit Sharma | 2022–2024 |
Last updated: 22 September 2024

==== Most man of the match awards ====
| Rank | M.O.M. Awards | Player | Matches | Period |
|---|---|---|---|---|
| 1 | 14 | Sachin Tendulkar | 200 | 1989–2013 |
| 2 | 11 | Ravindra Jadeja† | 91 | 2012–2026 |
| 2 | 11 | Rahul Dravid | 163 | 1996–2012 |
| 4 | 10 | Ravichandran Ashwin | 106 | 2011–2024 |
| 4 | 10 | Virat Kohli | 123 | 2011–2025 |
| 4 | 10 | Anil Kumble | 132 | 1990–2008 |
Last updated: 4 October 2025

==== Most man of the series awards ====
| Rank | M.O.S. Awards | Player | Matches | Period |
|---|---|---|---|---|
| 1 | 11 | Ravichandran Ashwin | 106 | 2011–2024 |
| 2 | 5 | Virender Sehwag | 103 | 2001–2013 |
| 2 | 5 | Sachin Tendulkar | 200 | 1989–2013 |
| 4 | 4 | Harbhajan Singh | 103 | 1998–2015 |
| 4 | 4 | Kapil Dev | 131 | 1978–1994 |
| 4 | 4 | Anil Kumble | 132 | 1990–2008 |
| 4 | 4 | Rahul Dravid | 163 | 1996–2012 |
Last updated: 20 December 2024

=== Youngest players on Debut ===
The youngest player to play in a Test match is claimed to be Hasan Raza at the age of 14 years and 227 days. Making his debut for Pakistan against Zimbabwe on 24 October 1996, there is some doubt as to the validity of Raza's age at the time. The youngest Indian to play Test cricket was Sachin Tendulkar who at the age of 16 years and 205 days debuted in the first Test of the series against Pakistan in November 1989.

| Rank | Age | Player | Opposition | Venue | Date |
|---|---|---|---|---|---|
| 1 | 16 years and 205 days | Sachin Tendulkar | Pakistan | National Stadium, Karachi, Pakistan | 15 November 1989 |
| 2 | 17 years and 75 days | Piyush Chawla | England | Punjab Cricket Association Stadium, Mohali, India | 9 March 2006 |
| 3 | 17 years and 118 days | Laxman Sivaramakrishnan | West Indies | Antigua Recreation Ground, St. John's, Antigua | 28 April 1983 |
| 4 | 17 years and 152 days | Parthiv Patel | West Indies | Trent Bridge, Nottingham, England | 8 August 2002 |
| 5 | 17 years and 193 days | Maninder Singh | Pakistan | National Stadium, Karachi, Pakistan | 23 December 1982 |
Last updated: 3 December 2017

=== Oldest players on Debut ===
England left-arm slow bowler James Southerton is the oldest player to appear in a Test match. Playing in the very first inaugural test against Australia in 1876 at Melbourne Cricket Ground, in Melbourne, Australia, he was aged 49 years and 119 days. Rustomji Jamshedji is the oldest Indian Test debutant when he played his only game during the first Test of the 1933–34 series at the Bombay Gymkhana.

| Rank | Age | Player | Opposition | Venue | Date |
|---|---|---|---|---|---|
| 1 | 41 years and 27 days | Rustomji Jamshedji | England | Bombay Gymkhana, Mumbai, India | 15 December 1933 |
| 2 | 40 years and 39 days | Cotah Ramaswami | England | Old Trafford Cricket Ground, Manchester, England | 25 July 1936 |
| 3 | 39 years and 102 days | Amir Elahi | Australia | Sydney Cricket Ground, Sydney, Australia | 12 December 1947 |
| 4 | 37 years and 329 days | Keki Tarapore | West Indies | Arun Jaitley Stadium, Delhi, India | 10 November 1948 |
| 5 | 37 years and 124 days | Shute Banerjee | West Indies | Bombay Gymkhana, Mumbai, India | 4 February 1949 |
Last updated: 20 June 2020

=== Oldest players ===
England all-rounder Wilfred Rhodes is the oldest player to appear in a Test match. Playing in the fourth Test against the West Indies in 1930 at Sabina Park, in Kingston, Jamaica, he was aged 52 years and 165 days on the final day's play. The oldest Indian Test player is Vinoo Mankad who was aged 41years and 300 days when he represented India for the final time in the fifth Test of the 1959 tour by West Indies at the Arun Jaitley Stadium, then known as Feroze Shah Kotla Stadium.

| Rank | Age | Player | Opposition | Venue | Date |
|---|---|---|---|---|---|
| 1 | 41 years and 300 days | Vinoo Mankad | West Indies | Arun Jaitley Stadium, Delhi, India | 6 February 1959 |
| 2 | 41 years and 92 days | Lala Amarnath | Pakistan | Eden Gardens, Kolkata, India | 12 December 1952 |
| 3 | 41 years and 27 days | Rustomji Jamshedji | England | Bombay Gymkhana, Mumbai, India | 15 December 1933 |
| 4 | 40 years and 289 days | CK Nayudu | England | The Oval, London, England | 15 August 1936 |
| 5 | 40 years and 204 days | Sachin Tendulkar | West Indies | Wankhede Stadium, Mumbai, India | 14 November 2013 |
Last updated: 28 January 2021

== Partnership records ==
In cricket, two batsmen are always present at the crease batting together in a partnership. This partnership will continue until one of them is dismissed, retires or the innings comes to a close.

=== Highest partnerships by wicket ===
A wicket partnership describes the number of runs scored before each wicket falls. The first wicket partnership is between the opening batsmen and continues until the first wicket falls. The second wicket partnership then commences between the not out batsman and the number three batsman. This partnership continues until the second wicket falls. The third wicket partnership then commences between the not out batsman and the new batsman. This continues down to the tenth wicket partnership. When the tenth wicket has fallen, there is no batsman left to partner so the innings is closed.

| Wicket | Runs | First batsman | Second batsman | Opposition | Venue | Date | Scorecard |
|---|---|---|---|---|---|---|---|
| 1st wicket | 413 | Vinoo Mankad | Pankaj Roy | New Zealand | Jawaharlal Nehru Stadium, Chennai, India | 6 January 1956 | Scorecard |
| 2nd wicket | 370 | Murali Vijay | Cheteshwar Pujara | Australia | Rajiv Gandhi International Stadium, Hyderabad, India | 2 March 2013 | Scorecard |
| 3rd wicket | 336 | Virender Sehwag | Sachin Tendulkar | Pakistan | Multan Cricket Stadium, Multan, Pakistan | 28 March 2004 | Scorecard |
| 4th wicket | 365 | Virat Kohli | Ajinkya Rahane | New Zealand | Holkar Cricket Stadium, Indore, India | 8 October 2016 | Scorecard |
| 5th wicket | 376 | VVS Laxman | Rahul Dravid | Australia | Eden Gardens, Kolkata, India | 11 March 2001 | Scorecard |
| 6th wicket | 298* | Dilip Vengsarkar | Ravi Shastri | Australia | Wankhede Stadium, Mumbai, India | 15 October 1986 | Scorecard |
| 7th wicket | 280 | Rohit Sharma | Ravichandran Ashwin | West Indies | Eden Gardens, Kolkata, India | 6 November 2013 | Scorecard |
| 8th wicket | 241 | Virat Kohli | Jayant Yadav | England | Wankhede Stadium, Mumbai, India | 8 December 2016 | Scorecard |
| 9th wicket | 149 | Nana Joshi | Ramakant Desai | Pakistan | Brabourne Stadium, Mumbai, India | 2 December 1960 | Scorecard |
| 10th wicket | 133 | Sachin Tendulkar | Zaheer Khan | Bangladesh | Bangabandhu National Stadium, Dhaka, Bangladesh | 10 December 2004 | Scorecard |
Last updated: 20 June 2020

=== Highest partnerships by runs ===
The highest Test partnership by runs for any wicket is held by the Sri Lankan pairing of Kumar Sangakkara and Mahela Jayawardene who put together a third wicket partnership of 624 runs during the first Test against South Africa in July 2006. This broke the record of 576 runs set by their compatriots Sanath Jayasuriya and Roshan Mahanama against India in 1997. India's Vinoo Mankad and Pankaj Roy hold the 12th highest Test partnership with 413 made in 1956 against New Zealand.

| Wicket | Runs | First batsman | Second batsman | Opposition | Venue | Date | Scorecard |
|---|---|---|---|---|---|---|---|
| 1st wicket | 413 | Vinoo Mankad | Pankaj Roy | New Zealand | Jawaharlal Nehru Stadium, Chennai, India | 6 January 1956 | Scorecard |
| 1st wicket | 410 | Virender Sehwag | Rahul Dravid | Pakistan | Gaddafi Stadium, Lahore, Pakistan | 13 January 2006 | Scorecard |
| 5th wicket | 376 | VVS Laxman | Rahul Dravid | Australia | Eden Gardens, Kolkata, India | 11 March 2001 | Scorecard |
| 2nd wicket | 370 | Murali Vijay | Cheteshwar Pujara | Australia | Rajiv Gandhi International Stadium, Hyderabad, India | 2 March 2013 | Scorecard |
| 4th wicket | 365 | Virat Kohli | Ajinkya Rahane | New Zealand | Holkar Cricket Stadium, Indore, India | 8 October 2016 | Scorecard |
Last updated: 20 June 2020

=== Highest overall partnership runs by a pair ===
| Rank | Runs | Innings | Players | Highest | Average | 100 | 50 | Span |
|---|---|---|---|---|---|---|---|---|
| 1 | 6,920 | 143 | Rahul Dravid & Sachin Tendulkar | 249 | 50.51 | 20 | 29 | 1996–2012 |
| 2 | 4,412 | 87 | Gautam Gambhir & Virender Sehwag | 233 | 52.52 | 11 | 25 | 2004–2012 |
| 3 | 4,173 | 71 | Sourav Ganguly & Sachin Tendulkar | 281 | 61.36 | 12 | 16 | 1996–2008 |
| 4 | 4,065 | 86 | Rahul Dravid & VVS Laxman | 376 | 51.45 | 12 | 14 | 1996–2012 |
| 5 | 3,661 | 67 | Virat Kohli & Ajinkya Rahane | 365 | 56.32 | 10 | 17 | 2013–2023 |
An asterisk (*) signifies an unbroken partnership (i.e. neither of the batsmen was dismissed before either the end of the allotted overs or the required score being reached). Last updated: 21 July 2023

== Umpiring records ==
=== Most matches umpired ===
An umpire in cricket is a person who officiates the match according to the Laws of Cricket. Two umpires adjudicate the match on the field, whilst a third umpire has access to video replays, and a fourth umpire looks after the match balls and other duties. The records below are only for on-field umpires.

Aleem Dar of Pakistan holds the record for the most Test matches umpired with 130. The current active Dar set the record in December 2019 overtaking Steve Bucknor from the West Indies mark of 128 matches. They are followed by South Africa's Rudi Koertzen who officiated in 108. The most experienced Indian is Srinivas Venkataraghavan who is tenth on the list with 73 Test matches umpired.

| Rank | Matches | Umpire | Period |
|---|---|---|---|
| 1 | 73 | Srinivas Venkataraghavan | 1993–2004 |
| 2 | 33 | Sundaram Ravi | 2013–2019 |
| 3 | 30 | Nitin Menon† | 2019–2025 |
| 4 | 26 | V. K. Ramaswamy | 1985–1999 |
| 5 | 17 | B. Satyaji Rao | 1961–1979 |
| 5 | 17 | Swaroop Kishen | 1978–1984 |
Last updated: 12 June 2023

== See also ==
- List of Test cricket records
- List of India One Day International cricket records
- List of India Twenty20 International records
