= Vijay Yadav =

Vijay Yadav may refer to:

- Vijay Yadav (cricketer) (born 1967), Indian cricketer
- Vijay Kumar Yadav (Communist Party politician) (born 1929), Indian politician in the Lok Sabha
- Vijay Singh Yadav (born 1953), Indian politician in the Rajya Sabha
- Vijay Bahadur Yadav, member of the Uttar Pradesh Legislative Assembly
- Vijay Kumar Yadav (judoka), Indian judoka
- Vijay Singh Yadav (advocate), Indian advocate
