= Zimbabwean cricket team in India in 1992–93 =

International cricket tour

Zimbabwe's tour of India in 1992-93
	India	Zimbabwe
- Dates: 13 March 1993 – 25 March 1993

Test series
- Result: India won the 1-match series 1–0
Most runs	Vinod Kambli 227	Andy Flower 177
Most wickets	Anil Kumble 8	John Traicos 3

One Day International series
- Results: India won the 3-match series 3–0
Most runs	Vinod Kambli 159	Grant Flower 149
Most wickets	Javagal Srinath 6	Grant Flower 3

The Zimbabwe national cricket team toured India in the 1992–93 season to play a Test match and three One day internationals. This was Zimbabwe's inaugural tour of India, and Zimbabwe lost all four matches.

== Only Test ==
13 March 1993
Scorecard

India	v	Zimbabwe
536/7d (132 overs); Vinod Kambli 227/301; John Traicos 3/186 (50 overs)		322 (135.1 overs); Andy Flower 115/236; Maninder Singh 3/79 (32 overs)
		201 (95.5 overs); Andy Flower 62*/191; Anil Kumble 5/70 (38.5 overs)

India won by an innings and 13 runs
Feroz Shah Kotla, Delhi
Umpires: SK Bansal (IND) and S Venkataraghavan (IND)
Player of the match: Vinod Kambli

- India won the toss and decided to bat
- Andy Flower scored his maiden test hundred
  Vijay Yadav, Gavin Briant, Ujesh Ranchod made his only test appearance
  Maninder Singh made his last appearance in test match

== Charms Cup ODI series ==
=== 1st ODI ===
19 March 1993
Scorecard

India; 249/7 (48 overs)	v	Zimbabwe; 182 (46.2 overs)
Vinod Kambli 80 (75); Grant Flower 2/25 (5 overs)		Grant Flower 42 (67); Javagal Srinath 3/38 (10 overs)

India won by 67 runs
Nahar Singh Stadium, Faridabad
Umpires: NN Menon, RC Sharma
Player of the match: Vinod Kambli

- Zimbabwe won the toss and decided to field
- The match was reduced to 48 overs per side

=== 2nd ODI ===
22 March 1993
Scorecard

Zimbabwe; 149/6 (28 overs)	v	India; 150/3 (27.3 overs)
Grant Flower 57 (65); Anil Kumble 2/32 (6 overs)		Manoj Prabhakar 51 (80); Grant Flower 1/23 (3.3 overs)

India won by 7 wickets
Nehru Stadium, Guwahati
Umpires: S Choudhary, RT Ramachandran
Player of the match: Grant Flower

- India won the toss and decided to field
- The match was reduced before play started to 28 overs per side

=== 3rd ODI ===
25 March 1993
Scorecard

Zimbabwe; 234 (49.5 overs)	v	India; 238/2 (49.3 overs)
Grant Flower 50 (86); Kapil Dev 3/54 (10 overs)		Woorkeri Raman 66 (86); John Traicos 1/50 (10 overs)

India won by 8 wickets
Nehru Stadium, Pune
Umpires: K Parthasarathy, SL Shastri
Player of the match: Vinod Kambli

- India won the toss and decided to field
