= Bangladeshi cricket team in India in 2016–17 =

International cricket tour

	India	Bangladesh
- Dates: 5 – 13 February 2017
Captains	Virat Kohli	Mushfiqur Rahim

Test series
- Result: India won the 1-match series 1–0
Most runs	Virat Kohli (242)	Mushfiqur Rahim (150)
Most wickets	Ravindra Jadeja (6); Ravichandran Ashwin (6)	Taskin Ahmed (3); Taijul Islam (3)

The Bangladesh cricket team toured India in February 2017 to play one Test match. It was the first time that Bangladesh toured India. Initially the tour was scheduled to take place in August 2016, but with other commitments made by the Board of Control for Cricket in India (BCCI), the Bangladesh Cricket Board (BCB) said that the first week of February looked more likely. The date of the Test was confirmed in August 2016. In January 2017 the BCCI moved the date back by one day. The Decision Review System (DRS) was used in the Test match.

Ahead of the Test match, there was a two-day tour match between India A and Bangladesh. Bangladesh's captain Mushfiqur Rahim downplayed the historic nature of the tour saying "we want to play in such a way that India invites again and again. This to me is just another Test match". India won the Test match by 208 runs.

During the Test match, India set several individual and team records. In their first innings, both Cheteshwar Pujara and Virat Kohli set individual batting records. Pujara passed the total for the most runs by a batsman in an Indian first-class season, with a total of 1,605. The previous record was 1,604 runs, set by Chandu Borde in the 1964–65 season. Kohli set a new record for the most Test runs in a home season, with 1,168. Virender Sehwag held the old record, when he made 1,105 runs in the 2004–05 season. Kohli also became the first player to score a double-century in four consecutive Test series. The previous best was three consecutive series, held jointly by Don Bradman and Rahul Dravid. Ravichandran Ashwin became the fastest player, in terms of number of Tests, to take 250 wickets. He achieved it in 45 matches, beating the previous quickest of 48 Tests, set by Dennis Lillee.

India's first innings total of 687 declared was the first time that a team had made a score of 600 plus in three consecutive innings in Tests. Their win in this Test gave them their sixth consecutive series win, their best in Tests. The streak started with a series win against Sri Lanka in September 2015. With this series win against Bangladesh, it gave Virat Kohli his nineteenth successive Test without a defeat, the most for any captain of India.

For Bangladesh, Mushfiqur Rahim became their fourth player to reach 3,000 runs in Tests. By the end of the match, he was Bangladesh's third-highest run-scorer in Tests, moving ahead of Habibul Bashar.

== Squads ==
India	Bangladesh
Virat Kohli (c); Ajinkya Rahane (vc); Ravichandran Ashwin; Ravindra Jadeja; Bhuvneshwar Kumar; ~~Amit Mishra~~; Abhinav Mukund; Karun Nair; Hardik Pandya; Cheteshwar Pujara; KL Rahul; Wriddhiman Saha (wk); Ishant Sharma; Murali Vijay; Jayant Yadav; Kuldeep Yadav; Umesh Yadav	Mushfiqur Rahim (c, wk); Shakib Al Hasan (vc); Taskin Ahmed; Litton Das (wk); Mominul Haque; Mehedi Hasan; Mosaddek Hossain; Tamim Iqbal; Shafiul Islam; Taijul Islam; ~~Imrul Kayes~~; Mahmudullah; Kamrul Islam Rabbi; Sabbir Rahman; Subashis Roy; Soumya Sarkar

Bangladesh's Imrul Kayes was injured during the tour match and was replaced by Mosaddek Hossain. India's Amit Mishra suffered an injury during the final Twenty20 International match against England on 1 February. He was replaced by Kuldeep Yadav.

== Tour match ==
5–6 February 2017
Scorecard

Bangladesh	v	India A
224/8d (67 overs); Soumya Sarkar 52 (73); Aniket Choudhary 4/26 (12 overs)		461/8d (90 overs); Vijay Shankar 103* (81); Subashis Roy 3/57 (16 overs)
73/2 (15 overs); Tamim Iqbal 42* (54); Kuldeep Yadav 2/2 (2 overs)

Match drawn
Gymkhana Ground, Secunderabad
Umpires: Kusha Prakash (Ind) and Nand Kishore (Ind)

- Bangladesh won the toss and elected to bat.
- 14 players per side (11 batting, 11 fielding).

== Only Test ==
9–13 February 2017
Scorecard

India	v	Bangladesh
687/6d (166 overs); Virat Kohli 204 (246); Taijul Islam 3/156 (47 overs)		388 (127.5 overs); Mushfiqur Rahim 127 (262); Umesh Yadav 3/84 (25 overs)
159/4d (29 overs); Cheteshwar Pujara 54* (58); Taskin Ahmed 2/43 (7 overs)		250 (100.3 overs); Mahmudullah 64 (149); Ravichandran Ashwin 4/73 (30.3 overs)

India won by 208 runs
Rajiv Gandhi International Stadium, Hyderabad
Umpires: Marais Erasmus (SA) and Joel Wilson (WI)
Player of the match: Virat Kohli (Ind)

- India won the toss and elected to bat.
