= Indian cricket team in Sri Lanka in 1993 =

International cricket tour

	Sri Lanka	India
- Dates: 17 July – 14 August 1993
Captains	Arjuna Ranatunga	Mohammad Azharuddin

Test series
- Result: India won the 3-match series 1–0
Most runs	Aravinda de Silva (266)	Vinod Kambli (249)
Most wickets	Pramodya Wickramasinghe (6)	Anil Kumble (13)
- Player of the series: Aravinda de Silva (SL) and Manoj Prabhakar (Ind)

One Day International series
- Results: Sri Lanka won the 3-match series 2–1
Most runs	Roshan Mahanama (116)	Mohammad Azharuddin (200)
Most wickets	Pramodya Wickramasinghe (7)	Manoj Prabhakar (7)

The Indian cricket team toured Sri Lanka from 12 July to 14 August 1993. The tour began with a first-class fixture against Sri Lanka Board President's XI and ended with the final ODI game. In all, it consisted of one first-class game, and three Test and One Day Internationals (ODIs) each.

India beat Sri Lanka 1–0 in the Test series and lost 2–1 in the ODI series. Sri Lanka's Aravinda de Silva scored a total of 266 runs in the Test series and was named the Player of the Series alongside India's Manoj Prabhakar. India's Anil Kumble picked up 13 wickets and was the highest wicket-taker in the series. In the ODI series, India's Mohammad Azharuddin top-scored with 200 runs, and Prabhakar and Sri Lanka's Pramodya Wickramasinghe with seven wickets each were the highest wicket-takers.

== Squads ==
India
- Mohammad Azharuddin (c)
- Sachin Tendulkar (vc)
- Vinod Kambli
- Praveen Amre
- Woorkeri Raman
- Navjot Singh Sidhu
- Ajay Sharma
- Kapil Dev
- Manoj Prabhakar
- Salil Ankola
- Javagal Srinath
- Anil Kumble
- Venkatapathy Raju
- Rajesh Chauhan
- Vijay Yadav
- Kiran More

== Tour match ==
=== Three-day match: Sri Lanka Board President's XI vs Indians ===
12 July
Scorecard

Indians	v	Sri Lanka Board President's XI
342/6d (90 overs); Mohammad Azharuddin 100 (148); Ruwan Kalpage 2/77 (25 overs)		415 (129.3 overs); Sanath Jayasuriya 151 (239); Venkatapathy Raju 4/101 (38 overs)
148/1 (45 overs); Pravin Amre 70* (121); Ravindra Pushpakumara 1/30 (8 overs)

Match drawn
Welagedara Stadium, Kurunegala
Umpires: Lalith Jayasundara (SL) and Milroy Mendis (SL)

- Indians won the toss and decided to bat.
- Mohammad Azharuddin (Ind) passed 10,000 runs in first-class matches when he reached 39.

== Test Series ==
=== 1st Test ===
17–22 July
scorecard

Sri Lanka	v	India
24/3 (12 overs); Asanka Gurusinha 10* (29); Manoj Prabhakar 2/13 (6 overs)

Match drawn
Asgiriya Stadium, Kandy
Umpires: K. T. Francis (SL) and T. M. Samarasinghe (SL)

- India won the toss and decided to field.
- No play was possible on days 1, 3, 4 and 5 due to rain. With 12 overs and 49 minutes of play on day 2, it was hitherto the shortest-ever Test.

=== 2nd Test ===
27 July–1 August
scorecard

India	v	Sri Lanka
366 (107.1 overs); Vinod Kambli 125 (220); Jayananda Warnaweera 3/76 (20.1 overs)		254 (77.5 overs); Arjuna Ranatunga 88 (126); Anil Kumble 5/87 (24 overs)
359/4 d. (118 overs); Sachin Tendulkar 104* (161); Ruwan Kalpage 2/97 (38 overs)		236 (121.1 overs); Aravinda de Silva 93 (268); Manoj Prabhakar 3/49 (18 overs)

India won by 235 runs
Sinhalese Sports Club Ground, Colombo
Umpires: Ignatius Anandappa (SL) and Selliah Ponnadurai (SL)
Player of the match: Manoj Prabhakar (Ind)

- India won the toss and decided to bat.
- Ruwan Kalpage (SL) made his Test debut.
- The win was India's first overseas series win in seven years and first in Sri Lanka.
- Aravinda de Silva became the second Sri Lankan to reach 2,000 runs in Tests.
- Kapil Dev, playing his 126th Test, became India's most capped player and second overall.

=== 3rd Test ===
4–9 August
Scorecard

Sri Lanka	v	India
351 (142.1 overs); Aravinda de Silva 148 (297); Rajesh Chauhan 3/59 (26 overs)		446 (151.1 overs); Vinod Kambli 120 (241); Muttiah Muralitharan 4/136 (47.1 overs)
352/6 (153.2 overs); Roshan Mahanama 151 (362); Anil Kumble 3/108 (38.2 overs)

Match drawn
P Saravanamuttu Stadium, Colombo
Umpires: B. C. Cooray (SL) and Peter Manuel (SL)
Player of the match: Roshan Mahanama (SL)

- Sri Lanka won the toss and decided to bat.
- Kapil Dev (Ind) passed Lance Gibbs's record of 27,115 for most deliveries in Test cricket.

== One Day Internationals (ODIs) ==
Sri Lanka won the series 2–1.

=== 1st ODI ===
25 July 1993
Scorecard

India; 212/8 (50 overs)	v	Sri Lanka; 211 (49.2 overs)
M Azharuddin 53 (57); RS Kalpage 3/42 (10 overs)		UC Hathurusingha 64 (121); A Kumble 2/22 (10 overs)

India won by 1 run
Khettarama Stadium, Colombo
Umpires: KT Francis and TM Samarasinghe
Player of the match: M Azharuddin (IND)

- Sri Lanka won the toss and elected to field.
- RK Chauhan (IND) made his ODI debut.

=== 2nd ODI ===
12 August 1993 (D/N)
Scorecard

Sri Lanka; 204/7 (50 overs)	v	India; 196 (49.2 overs)
A Ranatunga 50 (52); M Prabhakar 2/33 (8 overs)		M Prabhakar 86 (123); GP Wickramasinghe 3/34 (8 overs)

Sri Lanka won by 8 runs
Khettarama Stadium, Colombo
Umpires: BC Cooray and DN Pathirana
Player of the match: A Ranatunga (SL)

- India won the toss and elected to field.
- M Muralitharan (SL) made his ODI debut.

=== 3rd ODI ===
14 August 1993
Scorecard

India; 227/9 (50 overs)	v	Sri Lanka; 231/6 (49.3 overs)
M Azharuddin 85 (103); GP Wickramasinghe 3/54 (10 overs)		RS Mahanama 92 retired hurt (143); M Prabhakar 3/38 (9 overs)

Sri Lanka won by 4 wickets
Tyronne Fernando Stadium, Moratuwa
Umpires: BC Cooray and PT Manuel
Player of the match: RS Mahanama (SL)

- India won the toss and elected to bat.
