= Indian cricket team against Pakistan in Sri Lanka in 2015–16 =

	Pakistan	India
- Date: December 2015

One Day International series

Twenty20 International series

The Indian cricket team were scheduled to tour Sri Lanka in December 2015 to play Pakistan. The tour was planned to consist of three One Day Internationals (ODIs) and two Twenty20 Internationals (T20Is). Despite several locations being suggested to host the matches, neither side could agree on when and where to play the games and the series did not go ahead.

== Background ==
Originally the tour was scheduled to take place in the United Arab Emirates between 8 December 2015 and 9 January 2016, with the teams playing three Test matches, five ODIs and two T20Is.

On 24 August 2015 Zaheer Abbas, the president of cricket's governing body, said that the series might be delayed. In October 2015 Shahryar Khan, chairman of the Pakistan Cricket Board (PCB), said that Pakistan would consider pulling out of the 2016 World Twenty20 tournament if this series did not go ahead.

In November 2015 the PCB and Board of Control for Cricket in India (BCCI) were still in talks about agreeing the location of the series, with the BCCI suggesting it could be held in India, rather than the UAE. A day after the BCCI made its suggestion, the PCB stated that Pakistan could not play a series in India and that the series would only be possible if it was played in the UAE. The PCB's Shaharyar Khan said that a decision regarding the series lies with the Pakistan prime minister, Nawaz Sharif.

On 22 November 2015 a meeting with the BCCI and PCB took place, where the possibility of holding the series in Sri Lanka was presented as an option. This would consist of three ODI matches and two T20I matches. The BCCI confirmed that the series would take place in Sri Lanka, with other options being Bangladesh and England, the latter proposed for the Summer of 2016.

However, the Indian government had not granted permission for the series to take place, stating that the final decision rests with the Indian prime minister, Narendra Modi. In response to the delay from the Indian government, the PCB said that they would host a one-off T20 tournament that features five domestic sides if the series does not go ahead.

An outcome on the future of the series was scheduled to be announced on 9 December. However, despite a meeting taking place between ministers from both India and Pakistan, no decision was reached regarding the series.

On 19 December 2015 the BCCI secretary Anurag Thakur had all but ruled out the series from happening, with a short window before India's tour to Australia in January. He said that the decision lies with Pakistan and the PCB to make.

== Anti-Pakistan protests in Mumbai ==
On the morning of 19 October, BCCI president Shashank Manohar and PCB chairman Shaharyar Khan were to discuss a proposed India-Pakistan series in December. Just prior the meeting a group of 50 workers from the Shiv Sena, a far-right nationalist political party, stormed into the BCCI headquarters in Mumbai, shouting anti-Pakistan slogans and demanding the cancellation of the series. They also threatened to stop Aleem Dar from officiating in the Mumbai ODI of the ongoing India-South Africa ODI series.

Aleem Dar, a member of the elite panel of ICC umpires, who had officiated in the first three ODIs of the series, and was also scheduled to umpire in the fourth and fifth ODIs in Chennai and Mumbai, was withdrawn from the ODIs in response to the above incident by the ICC. Wasim Akram and Shoaib Akhtar, a part of the commentary team, decided to leave India before the 5th ODI at Mumbai.

== See also ==
- Indian cricket team in Sri Lanka in 2015
