= Arrest of Vijay Singh Yadav =

- Date: 9 February 2021
- Location: Ratlam, Madhya Pradesh
- Type: Arrest
- Arrests: 1
- Charges: Cheating and dishonestly inducing delivery of property Forgery of valuable security Forgery for purpose of cheating
- Litigation: At the Madhya Pradesh High Court

On 9 February 2021, Indian advocate Vijay Singh Yadav was arrested for sending a birthday wish to a judge. He spent four months in jail before his release was granted on 15 June.

== People involved ==
=== Vijay Singh Yadav ===
Vijay Singh Yadav is a lawyer who practiced in the Ratlam District court in Madhya Pradesh, who sent the greeting of issue in this case. He has four children. The 37-year-old lawyer allegedly downloaded a photo of Judicial Magistrate First Class Mithali Pathak from her Facebook account and used it to make a greeting card which he then sent to her on her official email address on 29 January. The greeting was sent via email and on the next day by speed-post.

Vijay says the image was downloaded from Google. According to Yadav's brother Jay, a day after the birthday card, Yadav had submitted a 'private complaint' to the Chief Judicial Magistrate against the judge, which Yadav's bail plea says led to the false allegation

== Arrest ==
=== Events preceding the arrest ===
On 28 January 2021, Vijay allegedly send a birthday greeting to the Judicial Magistrate First Class that included a photo that was allegedly downloaded from her facebook account and attached. The same was sent via a speed-post later. Following this, she reported to the Station Road Police Station in Ratlam.

Subsequently, a first information report was lodged on charges of, inter alia, sections 420 (cheating and dishonestly inducing delivery of property), 467 (Forgery of valuable security), and 468 (forgery for purpose of cheating) of the Indian Penal Code, as well as various provisions of the Information Technology Act, 2000.

=== Arrest and bail requests ===
Yadav was arrested at his home by Ratlam Police on the aforementioned charges on 9 February. Four days after the arrest, his family members approached a lower court for bail, which was rejected. They subsequently appealed to the High Court, which was rejected on 27 April. In his bail plea on 13 February, Yadav claimed that he had sent the birthday greeting to her official email ID, as a social worker and president of Jai Kul Devi Sewa Samiti Ratlam, a social ground, and not as an individual. The high court ordered a medical examination of Yadav to check his mental health, and said his actions caused great embarrassment to the judge.

The family then filed a second application for bail, which was finally granted. After spending more than four months in jail, Vijay was released on 15 June.
