= Indian cricket team in Sri Lanka in 2015 =

International cricket tour

	Sri Lanka	India
- Dates: 6 August – 1 September 2015
Captains	Angelo Mathews	Virat Kohli

Test series
- Result: India won the 3-match series 2–1
Most runs	Angelo Mathews (339)	Virat Kohli (333)
Most wickets	Dhammika Prasad (15)	Ravichandran Ashwin (21)
- Player of the series: Ravichandran Ashwin (Ind)

The Indian cricket team toured Sri Lanka from 6 August to 1 September 2015 to play a tour match and three Test matches. On 27 June 2015, Sri Lankan batsman Kumar Sangakkara said he would retire from international cricket after the second Test of the series. The Board of Control for Cricket in India (BCCI) and Sri Lanka Cricket Board confirmed the schedule of India's tour to Sri Lanka in August to September 2015. The tour started with a three-day warm-up game against Sri Lanka Board President's XI, followed by three Test matches. The Test matches were played at Galle, P Sara Oval, and SSC Colombo. The Indian team arrived in Sri Lanka on 4 August 2015.

Three different openers for India Shikhar Dhawan (134), Lokesh Rahul (108) and Cheteshwar Pujara (145) made centuries in the series. This was fifth time in Test history. The last happened in 1970 Ashes by John Edrich, Geoff Boycott and Brian Luckhurst for England.

India won the three-match series 2–1, with Virat Kohli winning his first Test series as captain of India, and this was the first series win by India in Sri Lanka since 1993. This series win also gave India their first overseas Test series victory since the 2011 tour in the West Indies.

== Squads ==
Sri Lanka	India
Angelo Mathews (c); Dushmantha Chameera; Dinesh Chandimal (wk); Vishwa Fernando; Rangana Herath; Dimuth Karunaratne; Tharindu Kaushal; Jehan Mubarak; Dilruwan Perera; Kusal Perera (wk); Nuwan Pradeep; Dhammika Prasad; Kumar Sangakkara; Kaushal Silva; Upul Tharanga; Lahiru Thirimanne	Virat Kohli (c); Varun Aaron; Ravichandran Ashwin; Shikhar Dhawan^{3}; Bhuvneshwar Kumar; Amit Mishra; Cheteshwar Pujara; Ajinkya Rahane; KL Rahul (wk); Wriddhiman Saha (wk)^{4}; Naman Ojha (wk)^{5}; Karun Nair^{5}; Ishant Sharma; Rohit Sharma; Harbhajan Singh; Murali Vijay^{1}; Umesh Yadav; Stuart Binny^{2}

^{1} Murali Vijay was ruled out of the first Test and also last Test due to a hamstring injury.
^{2} Stuart Binny was added to India's squad before the second Test.
^{3} Shikhar Dhawan was ruled out of the last two matches after fracturing his right hand in the first Test.
^{4} Wriddhiman Saha was ruled out of the last Test due to a hamstring injury.
^{5} Naman Ojha and Karun Nair were added to India's squad before the third Test.

== Tour match ==
=== Three day:Sri Lanka Board President's XI vs Indians ===
6–8 August
Scorecard

Indians	v	Sri Lanka Board President's XI
351 (88.1 overs); Ajinkya Rahane 109 (127); Kasun Rajitha 5/68 (17 overs)		121 (31 overs); Niroshan Dickwella 41 (53); Ishant Sharma 5/23 (7 overs)
180 (58.4 overs); Lokesh Rahul 47 (94); Kasun Rajitha 2/38 (12 overs)		200/6 (54 overs); Kaushal Silva 83* (163); Ravichandran Ashwin 3/38 (8 overs)

Match drawn
R Premadasa Stadium, Colombo
Umpires: Lyndon Hannibal (SL) and Asanga Jayasooriya (SL)

- Sri Lanka Board President's XI won the toss and elected to field.
- Players per side 15 (11 batting, 11 fielding).

== Test series ==
=== 1st Test ===
12–16 August
Scorecard

Sri Lanka	v	India
183 (49.3 overs); Angelo Mathews 64 (92); Ravichandran Ashwin 6/46 (13.4 overs)		375 (147.4 overs); Shikhar Dhawan 134 (271); Tharindu Kaushal 5/134 (32.4 overs)
367 (82.2 overs); Dinesh Chandimal 162* (169); Ravichandran Ashwin 4/114 (28.2 overs)		112 (49.5 overs); Ajinkya Rahane 36 (76); Rangana Herath 7/48 (21 overs)

Sri Lanka won by 63 runs
Galle International Stadium, Galle
Umpires: Nigel Llong (Eng) and Bruce Oxenford (Aus)
Player of the match: Dinesh Chandimal (SL)

- Sri Lanka won the toss and elected to bat.
- Angelo Mathews (SL) made his 50th Test appearance.
- Ravichandran Ashwin (Ind) took his 11th five-wicket haul and first against Sri Lanka. His figures of 6/46 is the best bowling figures by an Indian against Sri Lanka in Sri Lanka.

=== 2nd Test ===
20–24 August
Scorecard

India	v	Sri Lanka
393 (114 overs); KL Rahul 108 (190); Rangana Herath 4/81 (25 overs)		306 (108 overs); Angelo Mathews 102 (167); Amit Mishra 4/43 (21 overs)
325/8d (91 overs); Ajinkya Rahane 126 (243); Dhammika Prasad 4/43 (15 overs)		134 (43.4 overs); Dimuth Karunaratne 46 (103); Ravichandran Ashwin 5/42 (16 overs)

India won by 278 runs
P Sara Oval, Colombo
Umpires: Bruce Oxenford (Aus) and Rod Tucker (Aus)
Player of the match: KL Rahul (Ind)

- India won the toss and elected to bat.
- Rain interrupted play twice during Sri Lanka's first innings on Day 3 and in the second innings on Day 5.
- Kumar Sangakkara (SL) played his final international match.
- Amit Mishra (Ind) took his 50th Test wicket when he dismissed Dhammika Prasad in the first innings.

=== 3rd Test ===
28 August – 1 September
Scorecard

India	v	Sri Lanka
312 (100.1 overs); Cheteshwar Pujara 145* (289); Dhammika Prasad 4/100 (26 overs)		201 (52.2 overs); Kusal Perera 55 (56); Ishant Sharma 5/54 (15 overs)
274 (76 overs); Ravichandran Ashwin 58 (87); Nuwan Pradeep 4/62 (17 overs)		268 (85 overs); Angelo Mathews 110 (237); Ravichandran Ashwin 4/69 (20 overs)

India won by 117 runs
Sinhalese Sports Club Ground, Colombo
Umpires: Nigel Llong (Eng) and Rod Tucker (Aus)
Player of the match: Cheteshwar Pujara (Ind)

- Sri Lanka won the toss and elected to field.
- Rain interrupted India's innings at 15 overs on day 1 with no play was possible. Rain also interrupted play in the 96th over of India's first innings on day 2 with play being called off for the day.
- On day 3 rain interrupted play in the 9th over of India's second innings with play being called off for the day.
- Naman Ojha (Ind) and Kusal Perera (SL) made their Test debuts. This was 14th time that two wicket-keepers made their debuts in the same Test.
- Ishant Sharma (Ind) returned the best bowling figures in an innings by an Indian pace bowler in Sri Lanka (5/54). He also became the 8th Indian to reach 200 Test wickets.
- Dhammika Prasad (SL) returned his career-best bowling figures in a Test (8/169).

== See also ==
- Indian cricket team against Pakistan in Sri Lanka in 2015–16
