= Rustomji Jamshedji =

Indian cricketer

Personal information
- Full name: Rustomji Jamshedji Dorabji Jamshedji
- Born: 18 November 1892; Bombay, Bombay Presidency, British India
- Died: 5 April 1976 (aged 83); Bombay, Maharashtra, India
- Batting: Right-handed
- Bowling: Slow left-arm orthodox

International information
- National side: India (1933)
- Only Test (cap 14): 15 December 1933 v England

Career statistics
| Competition | Test | First-class |
|---|---|---|
| Matches | 1 | 29 |
| Runs scored | 5 | 291 |
| Batting average | – | 11.19 |
| 100s/50s | 0/0 | 0/0 |
| Top score | 4* | 43 |
| Balls bowled | 210 | 5,835 |
| Wickets | 3 | 134 |
| Bowling average | 45.66 | 22.12 |
| 5 wickets in innings | 0 | 10 |
| 10 wickets in match | 0 | 3 |
| Best bowling | 3/137 | 7/61 |
| Catches/stumpings | 2/– | 7/– |
- Source: ESPNcricinfo, 9 June 2022

Rustomji Jamshedji Dorabji Jamshedji (18 November 1892 – 5 April 1976) was an Indian Test cricketer of the 1930s.

Jamshedji was a little left-arm spinner who played a single Test for India. He made his debut at the age of 41 years and 27 days and is still the oldest Indian on his Test debut. In the Test at Bombay Gymkhana against England in 1933/34, he took three wickets in the England innings.

Most of Jamshedji's noted successes were in the Bombay Quadrangular. Playing for Parsis, he took 11 for 122 in the 1922/23 final against the Hindus and 10 for 104 in the 1928/29 final against the Europeans. On the latter occasion, "wild scenes of jubilation were witnessed after the match and the Parsi team was mobbed by the admiring crowd". Jamshedji was chaired and carried to the pavilion.

Jamshedji met the English left-arm spinner Wilfred Rhodes in the early 1920s when Rhodes played in the Bombay tournament. Rhodes is reported to have told Jamshedji: "If I had your powers of spin, no side would get a hundred".. Jamshedji carried violin resin in his pocket to keep his fingers supple.

== Notes ==
- In his Cricinfo article "From Palwankar to Nayudu", Partab Ramchand names him as "Rusi" Jamshedji. Ramachandra Guha calls him "Jamsu".
