= Vinod Kambli =

Indian cricketer (born 1972)

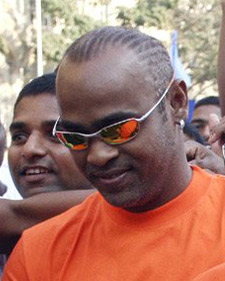
- Kambli in 2007

Personal information
- Full name: Vinod Ganpat Kambli
- Born: 18 January 1972 (age 54); Bombay (now Mumbai), Maharashtra, India
- Batting: Left-handed
- Bowling: Right arm off break
- Role: Batsman

International information
- National side: India (1991–2000)
- Test debut (cap 198): 29 January 1993 v England
- Last Test: 8 November 1995 v New Zealand
- ODI debut (cap 80): 18 October 1991 v Pakistan
- Last ODI: 29 October 2000 v Sri Lanka

Domestic team information
- Years: Team
- 1989–2011: Mumbai

Career statistics
Competition	Tests	ODIs	FC	LA
Matches	17	104	129	221
Runs scored	1,084	2,477	9,965	6,476
Batting average	54.20	32.59	59.97	41.24
100s/50s	4/3	2/14	35/44	11/35
Top score	227	106	262	149
Balls bowled	–	4	777	156
Wickets	–	1	10	1
Bowling average	–	7.00	49.70	159.00
5 wickets in innings	–	0	0	0
10 wickets in match	–	0	0	0
Best bowling	–	1/7	2/15	1/7
Catches/stumpings	7/–	15/–	56/–	50/–
Medal record
Men's cricket
Representing India
ICC Champions Trophy
Runner-up	2000 Kenya
ACC Asia Cup
Winner	1995 UAE
ACC U19 Asia Cup
Winner	1989 Bangladesh
- Source: Cricinfo, 4 February 2006

Vinod Ganpat Kambli (born 18 January 1972) is an Indian former international cricketer, who played for India as a left-handed middle order batsman, as well as for Mumbai and Boland, South Africa. Kambli became the first cricketer to score a century in a One-day International on his birthday. He was a part of the squad which finished as runners-up at the 2000 ICC Champions Trophy.

He has the highest career batting average for an Indian test cricketer of 54 but he played his last test when he was just 23 years old. Thereafter, he was only considered for One Day International matches, although his last appearance in that format was also at the young age of 28.

He has appeared as a commentator on various television channels and worked with a Marathi news channel as a cricket expert for the 2019 Cricket World Cup. He has also been a part of various reality shows and done a few serials and Bollywood films as an actor. He played a supporting role in the Kannada film Bettanagere. Kambli is currently on the Cricket Improvement Committee for Mumbai Cricket Association

== Early life ==
Vinod Kambli was born into a Maharashtrian family. He hails from Bhadakambe, Sakharpa (Ratnagiri). He is a childhood friend of the Indian cricketer Sachin Tendulkar.

== School cricket and later ==
He shared an unbroken partnership of 664 runs with Sachin Tendulkar in a school cricket match against St. Xavier's School, Fort. Kambli contributed 349 runs before their coach Ramakant Achrekar forced the pair to declare the innings; he then took six wickets for 37 runs in St. Xavier's first innings.

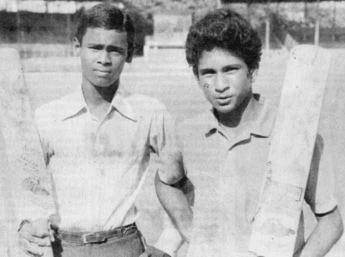
Vinod Kambli and Sachin Tendulkar during their school cricket days.

Kambli started his Ranji Trophy career with a six off the first ball he faced. He made his One Day International and Test debuts in 1991 and 1993, respectively. In Tests, he made four centuries including two double-centuries. He also holds the record for the fastest Indian player (14 innings) to reach 1,000 runs in Tests.

== International career ==
Kambli scored his maiden Test century in just his third Test, making 224 against England at Wankhede Stadium in 1993. In his next Test, against Zimbabwe, he scored 227. In his next Test series, he scored 125 and 120 against Sri Lanka. Kambli is the only cricketer to hit three consecutive Test centuries in three innings against three different countries.

In his 17 Tests, he averaged 69.13 in the first innings, and just 9.40 in the second innings, a difference of 59.73.

Kambli made his ODI debut as a teenager in 1991 against Pakistan during the Wills Sharjah Trophy. He played World Cup tournaments in 1992 and 1996. He has two ODI centuries into his credit: 100 not out against England at Jaipur in 1993 on his birthday, setting the record for becoming the first batsman to score an ODI hundred on his birthday, and 106 against Zimbabwe at Kanpur in the 1996 World Cup.

Kambli played his last Test match in 1995 at the age of only 23,^{[11]} while he played his last ODI in 2000. He formally announced his retirement from first-class cricket on 22 September 2011.^{[12]}

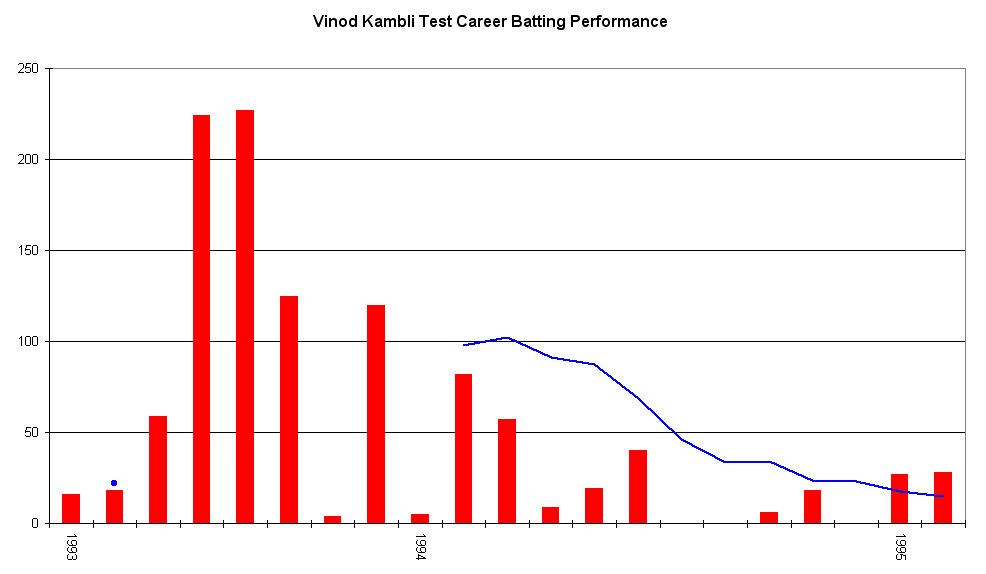
An innings-by-innings breakdown of Kambli's Test match batting career, showing runs scored (red bars) and the average of the last ten innings (blue line).

He played for Boland province in the South African domestic circuit.

== Coaching ==
On 15 August 2009, Kambli launched his Khel Bharti Sports Academy in Mumbai and announced his retirement from cricket as he wished to coach at Khel Bharti Academy.

He has been the Head Coach for the MCA Academy in BKC, Mumbai.

Kambli fulfilled a position within Tendulkar Middlesex Global Academy between 2018 and 2022. He finished his full time role as TMGA Head Coach for the academy at DY Patil, Navi Mumbai in early 2022.

== Personal life ==
Kambli first married Noella Lewis, a Catholic at St. Patrick's Cathedral, Poona. She worked as a receptionist at Hotel Blue Diamond (in Pune) in the year 1998. After separating from her Kambli married fashion model Andrea Hewitt. The couple has a child born in June 2010.

After his marriage to his second wife Andrea, Kambli converted to Catholicism, naming his son Jesus Christiano Kambli. Kambli has stated that he respects all religions.

Journalist Kunal Purandare has penned his biography called Vinod Kambli: The Lost Hero.

In 2009, Kambli denied having received any help from Sachin Tendulkar however, in 2024, Kambli said Tendulkar significantly helped him financially, and added that Tendulkar paid for his two surgeries.

== Health ==
On Friday, 29 November 2013, Vinod Kambli was admitted to Mumbai's Lilavati Hospital, following a heart attack. Kambli was taken ill while he was driving from Chembur to Bandra and suddenly stopped the car. A policewoman on duty, Sujata Patil noticed he could not drive and arranged to rush him to Lilavati Hospital. Kambli underwent angioplasty on two of his blocked arteries in 2013. In August 2024, a video of Kambli being disoriented and struggling to walk surfaced on the internet, raising widespread concerns on his health once again. On Wednesday, 20 August 2025, Vinod Kambli's brother Virendra Kambli revealed that Vinod is currently recuperating at his residence in Bandra and is unable to speak properly.

Kambli has suffered from alcohol dependence and is currently in an elderly care home.

== Politics ==
Kambli joined the Bhakti Shakti Party and was appointed vice-president of the party. He contested the 2009 Assembly election from Vikhroli, Mumbai as a Lok Bharati Party candidate and lost the election. In 2011, he supported Anna Hazare's campaign of India against Corruption.

== Film career ==
Year	Film	Language	Cast	Director	Notes
2002	Annarth	Hindi	Sanjay Dutt, Sunil Shetty, Preeti Jhangiani	Ravi Dewan	
2009	Pal Pal Dil Ke Ssaat	Hindi	Ajay Jadeja, Mahi Gill, Satish Shah	V.K.Kumar	Dubbed in Malayalam as Aayiram Varnangal
2015	Bettanagere	Kannada	Sumanth Shailendra, Akshay	Mohan Gowda	

== Television ==
Year	Title	Role	Director
2004	Main Banoongi Miss India	Abhi	Rupesh D Gohil
2009	Bigg Boss (Hindi TV series) season 3	As himself	
2009	Comedy Circus 20-20	Contestant	
2016	Comedy Nights Bachao	Special appearance	
