= Vijay Yadav (cricketer) =

Indian cricketer

Personal information
- Born: 14 March 1967 (age 59); Gonda, Uttar Pradesh
- Batting: Right-handed
- Relatives: Amrita (wife)dec. 2006; Sonalika (daughter)dec. 2006

Career statistics
Competition	Test	ODI
Matches	1	19
Runs scored	30	118
Batting average	30.00	11.80
100s/50s	0/0	0/0
Top score	30	34*
Catches/stumpings	1/2	12/7
- Source: CricInfo, 4 February 2006

Vijay Yadav (born 14 March 1967) is a former cricketer. A wicketkeeper and an aggressive lower-order batsman, Yadav played 19 One Day Internationals from 1992 to 1994 and appeared once for India in Test cricket.

== Cricket career ==
A member of Haryana's first class team, Yadav won the Ranji Trophy with them in 1990–91, taking 24 catches and six stumpings in the campaign. The following season he took 25 dismissals and was rewarded by being called into the Indian squad for their tour of South Africa in 1992/93. Despite only touring as an understudy to the established Kiran More, Yadav got to make his ODI debut in a game at Bloemfontein.

== International career ==
The only Test match of his career came against Zimbabwe at Delhi. India won the match by an innings and 13 runs with Yadav making 2 stumpings and scoring 30 off 25 balls coming in at number 8.

Nayan Mongia soon emerged on the scene and as a result Yadav's international career was over by 1994. In his last ODI innings he was dismissed by Courtney Walsh for a first ball duck.

In April 2006, Yadav was badly injured in a car accident at Faridabad. He lost his 11-year-old daughter in the crash. He was later asked to be the fielding coach of the India A team.

== Personal life ==
Yadav was born on 14 March 1967 in Gonda, Uttar Pradesh.

In May 2022 news came that he is suffering from Kidney failure and in dire need of money for treatment.

Vijay Yadav has been on dialysis for quite sometime now. He has also suffered two heart attack. Since a car accident in 2006, he has been struggling with health issues.
