= 1996–97 NKP Salve Challenger Trophy =

NKP Salve Challenger Trophy 1996/97
- Date: 28 September - 1 October 1996
- Location: Mohali, Punjab, India
- Result: Won by India Seniors
Teams
India Seniors	India A	India B
Captains
(India) Sachin Tendulkar	(India) Anil Kumble	(India) Woorkeri Raman
Most runs
Sachin Tendulkar (219)	Robin Singh (112)	Woorkeri Raman (210)
Most wickets
Javagal Srinath (6)	Anil Kumble (3)	Sandeep Sharma (4)

The 3rd NKP Salve Challenger Trophy was an Indian domestic cricket tournament that was held in Mohali from 28 September to 1 October 1996. The series involved the domestic and national players from India allocated in India Seniors, India A, and India B. India Seniors won the Challenger trophy after defeating India B by 8 wickets in the final.

== Squads ==
India Seniors	India A	India B
Sachin Tendulkar (c); Nayan Mongia (wk); Mohammad Azharuddin; Sourav Ganguly; Vinod Kambli; Rahul Dravid; Ajay Jadeja; Sunil Joshi; Narendra Hirwani; Javagal Srinath; Venkatesh Prasad; Aashish Kapoor	Anil Kumble (c); Vikram Rathour (wk); Navjot Singh Sidhu; Gagan Khoda; VVS Laxman; Sanjay Manjrekar; Saba Karim; David Johnson; Paras Mhambrey; Robin Singh; Venkatapathy Raju; Sanjay Raul	Woorkeri Raman (c); Sujith Somasunder; Pankaj Dharmani; Abhijit Kale; Sridharan Sharath; Rajeev Nayyar; Divakar Vasu; Sairaj Bahutule; Salil Ankola; Sameer Dighe (wk); Sandeep Sharma; Utpal Chatterjee

== Points Table ==
Pos	Team	Pld	W	L	NR	Pts	NRR
1	India Seniors	2	2	0	0	4	0.890
2	India B	2	1	1	0	2	−0.550
3	India A	2	0	2	0	0	−0.382

== Matches ==
=== Group stage ===
28 September 1996

India A 212/5 (50 overs)	v	India Seniors; 213/5 (46.5 overs)
Gagan Khoda 82 (128); Venkatesh Prasad 2/35 (10 overs)		Mohammad Azharuddin 48 (69); Robin Singh 2/46 (10 overs)

India Seniors won by 5 wickets.
PCA Stadium, Mohali
Umpires: CK Sathe (IND) and Devendra Sharma (IND)

- India A won the toss and elected to bat.
- Points: India Seniors 2, India A 0

29 September 1996

India B 188/6 (50 overs)	v	India Seniors; 190/0 (35.5 overs)
Abhijit Kale 46 (82); Narendra Hirwani 2/50 (10 overs)		Sachin Tendulkar 104* (112)

India Seniors won by 10 wickets.
PCA Stadium, Mohali
Umpires: Vijay Chopra (IND) and Shekhar Choudhary (IND)

- India B won the toss and elected to bat.
- Points: India Seniors 2, India B 0

30 September 1996

India A 232/8 (50 overs)	v	India B 233/2 (46 overs)
Robin Singh 91 (116); Salil Ankola 2/36 (10 overs)		Sujith Somasunder 105* (133); Anil Kumble 2/32 (10 overs)

India B won by 8 wickets.
PCA Stadium, Mohali
Umpires: CK Sathe (IND) and Devendra Sharma (IND)

- India B won the toss and elected to field.
- Points: India B 2, India A 0

== Final ==
1 October 1996

India B 228/9 (50 overs)	v	India Seniors; 232/3 (43.3 overs)
Woorkeri Raman 96 (123); Javagal Srinath 5/47 (10 overs)		Sachin Tendulkar 113 (122); Sandeep Sharma 2/36 (9 overs)

India Seniors won by 8 wickets.
PCA Stadium, Mohali
Umpires: Vijay Chopra (IND) and Shekhar Choudhary (IND)

- India Seniors won the toss and elected to field.
- India Seniors became the winners of NKP Salve Challenger Trophy 1996/97.
