= 1995–96 Ranji Trophy =

1995-96 Ranji Trophy
- The Ranji Trophy, which the winners get.
- Administrator: BCCI
- Cricket format: First-class cricket
- Tournament format(s): League and knockout
- Champions: Karnataka (4th title)
- Participants: 26
- Most runs: M. V. Sridhar (Hyderabad) (868)
- Most wickets: Sunil Joshi (Karnataka) (52)

The 1995–96 Ranji Trophy was the 62nd season of the Ranji Trophy. Karnataka defeated Tamil Nadu on first innings lead in the finals. For the first time, three teams in the semifinals were from the same zone - Hyderabad being the third team from the South Zone.

Sunil Joshi became the first, and as of 2015 the only, player to do the double of 500 runs and 50 wickets in a season.

== Knockout stage ==
Semi-finals
Tamil Nadu | 272 & 220/2
Delhi | 256 & 232
Karnataka | 423 & 312
Hyderabad | 188 & 363/7

Final
Tamil Nadu | 370 & 31/3
Karnataka | 620/8d & 277/6d

=== Quarter-finals ===
26 February – 1 March 1996
1st Quarter-final
Scorecard

| Karnataka (H) | v | Baroda |
| 480 (138.3 overs); Kartik Jeshwant 138; R. A. Swaroop 4/84 (31.3 overs) | | 213 (66.5 overs); Kiran More 49; David Johnson 5/91 (22 overs) |
| | | 188 (57 overs); Mukesh Narula 41*; Rangarao Ananth 4/57 (18 overs) |

Karnataka won by an innings and 79 runs
Rajinder Singh Institute Ground, Bangalore
Umpires: K. S. Giridharan and Jasbir Singh

- Baroda won the toss and elected to field.
- Kartik Jeshwant (Karnataka) reached 100 wickets in first-class cricket.

26 February – 1 March 1996
2nd Quarter-final
Scorecard

| Tamil Nadu (H) | v | Bombay |
| 246 (85.2 overs); Sridharan Sharath 86; Sairaj Bahutule 5/91 (33.2 overs) | | 196 (127.5 overs); Sulakshan Kulkarni 84*; Balaji Rao 4/46 (26.5 overs) |
| 250 (135.3 overs); Sridharan Sharath 90; Nilesh Kulkarni 3/67 (33 overs) | | 147 (61.3 overs); Amol Muzumdar 58*; Robin Singh 7/54 (22 overs) |

Tamil Nadu won by 153 runs
Indian Cement Company Ground, Tirunelveli
Umpires: Narendra Menon and Harnarain Singh Sekhon

- Tamil Nadu won the toss and elected to bat.

26 February – 1 March 1996
3rd Quarter-final
Scorecard

| Vidarbha | v | Hyderabad (H) |
| 409 (1661.1 overs); Umakant Phate 115; Narender Pal Singh 4/120 (40.1 overs) | | 620 (272.5 overs); VVS Laxman 196; Parimal Hedaoo 2/90 (35.5 overs) |
| 32/1 (14 overs); Manish Dosi 14*; Vanka Pratap 1/20 (5 overs) |

Match drawn
Gymkhana Ground, Secunderabad
Umpires: Sekhar Choudhary and Des Raj

- Vidarbha won the toss and elected to bat.

26 February – 1 March 1996
4th Quarter-final
Scorecard

| Delhi (H) | v | Railways |
| 431 (140.4 overs); Ajay Sharma 136; 5/86 (42 overs) | | 223 (73.2 overs); Vijendra Yadav 75; Atul Wassan 6/75 (21 overs) |
| 561/9 (183 overs); Ajay Sharma 182; Javed Alam 3/121 (39 overs) |

Match Drawn
Air Force Station, Delhi
Umpires: Kutticode Murali and Rangachari Vijayaraghavan

- Delhi won the toss and elected to bat.
- Ajay Sharma (Delhi) passed 1,000 runs in first-class cricket.

=== Semi-finals ===
14–18 March 1996
1st Semi-final
Scorecard

| Delhi | v | Tamil Nadu (H) |
| 256 (97.2 overs); Akash Malhotra 117; Divakar Vasu 5/71 (28 overs) | | 272 (103 overs); Woorkeri Raman 85; Nikhil Chopra 4/122 (35 overs) |
| 232 (92.2 overs); Sumeet Dogra 97; Balaji Rao 3/46 (20 overs) | | 220/2 (66 overs); Woorkeri Raman 116; Atul Wassan 1/28 (11 overs) |

Tamil Nadu won by 8 wickets
MA Chidambaram Stadium, Madras
Umpires: Purnachandra Godbole and M. R. Singh

- Delhi won the toss and elected to bat.
- Padmanabhan Rajesh (Tamil Nadu) made his first-class debut.

14–18 March 1996
2nd Semi-final
Scorecard

| Karnataka (H) | v | Hyderabad |
| 423 (134.5 overs); Rahul Dravid 153; Mohammad Mohiuddin 3/101 (23 overs) | | 188 (67 overs); Noel David 57; Sunil Joshi 4/58 (24 overs) |
| 312 (116.3 overs); Kartik Jeshwant 85; Ramakrishnan Sridhar 3/58 (43 overs) | | 363/7 (132 overs); VVS Laxman 203*; Sunil Joshi 5/126 (59 overs) |

Match drawn (Karnataka won on first innings lead)
M. Chinnaswamy Stadium, Bangalore
Umpires: Chandra Sathe and Surinder Kumar Sharma

- Karnataka won the toss and elected to bat.
- Mansur Ali Khan (Karnataka) made his first-class debut.
- Sujith Somasunder and Rahul Dravid (Karnataka) passed 1,000 and 4,000 runs respectively in first-class cricket.
- VVS Laxman (Hyderabad) passed 1,000 runs for the first-class season.

=== Final ===
27–31 March 1996
Scorecard

| Karnataka | v | Tamil Nadu (H) |
| 620/8d (168.4 overs); Vijay Bharadwaj 146; Balaji Rao 3/173 (54 overs) | | 370 (120 overs); Krishnaraj Srinath 85; Anil Kumble 5/95 (31 overs) |
| 277/6d (95 overs); Avinash Vaidya 61; Divakar Vasu 2/58 (22 overs) | | 31/3 (15 overs); S. Sharath 13*; Sunil Joshi 2/12 (6 overs) |

Match drawn (Karnataka won on first innings lead)
MA Chidambaram Stadium, Madras
Umpires: Shyam Bansal and Subroto Porel

- Karnataka won the toss and decided to bat.
- Krishnaraj Srinath and Sridharan Sharath (Tamil Nadu) passed 1,000 and 2,000 runs respectively in first-class cricket.
- Anil Kumble and Sunil Joshi (Karnataka) reached 400 and 100 wickets respectively in first-class cricket.

== Scorecards and averages ==
- CricketArchive
