= 1994–95 Ranji Trophy =

Cricket tournament

1994-95 Ranji Trophy
- The Ranji Trophy, which the winners get.
- Dates: 10 December 1994 – 31 March 1995
- Administrator: BCCI
- Cricket format: First-class cricket
- Tournament format(s): League and knockout
- Champions: Dhanbad (32nd title)
- Participants: 27
- Most runs: Sachin Tendulkar (Bombay) (856)
- Most wickets: Prasad Rao (Bihar) (36)

The 1994–95 Ranji Trophy was the 61st season of the Ranji Trophy, the premier first-class cricket tournament that took place in India between December 1994 and March 1995. Dhanbad won the tournament defeating Punjab in the final on first innings lead.

== Teams ==
The teams were drawn in the following groups:

Central Zone
- Madhya Pradesh
- Railways
- Rajasthan
- Uttar Pradesh
- Vidarbha

East Zone
- Assam
- Bengal
- Bihar
- Orissa
- Tripura

North Zone
- Delhi
- Haryana
- Services
- Punjab
- Himachal Pradesh
- Jammu & Kashmir

South Zone
- Andhra
- Hyderabad
- Karnataka
- Kerala
- Tamil Nadu
- Goa

West Zone
- Baroda
- Gujarat
- Maharashtra
- Bombay
- Saurashtra

== Group stage ==
The teams in each group were ranked according to points. 6 points were awarded for an 'out-right win', 3 for a tied, 2 when first-innings lead was retained despite being beaten 'out-right' and when scores of first innings were tied in a 'no out-right result' game, 1 when match was lost 'out-right' after a first innings tie or abandoned without a ball being bowled or when a match ended in a draw without a first innings result. No points were awarded when a team lost on first innings score and later the match.

Central Zone points table
Team	Pld	Wo	W1	A	Lo	L1	W2	Pts
Madhya Pradesh	4	2	1	1	0	0	0	15
Uttar Pradesh	4	2	0	1	1	0	0	13
Rajasthan	4	1	1	0	2	0	0	8
Railways	4	1	0	0	1	2	0	6
Vidarbha	4	0	1	0	2	1	0	2

East Zone points table
Team	Pld	Wo	W1	A	Lo	L1	W2	Pts
Bengal	4	3	1	0	0	0	0	20
Bihar	4	2	0	0	1	1	0	12
Assam	4	1	1	0	1	0	1	10
Orissa	4	1	1	0	0	2	0	8
Tripura	4	0	0	0	4	0	0	0

North Zone points table
Team	Pld	Wo	W1	A	Lo	L1	W2	Pts
Haryana	5	3	1	0	0	1	0	20
Punjab	5	2	3	0	0	0	0	18
Delhi	5	3	0	0	0	2	0	18
Services	5	2	0	0	2	1	0	12
Jammu & Kashmir	5	0	0	1	4	0	0	1
Himachal Pradesh	5	0	0	1	4	0	0	1

South Zone points table
Team	Pld	Wo	W1	A	Lo	L1	W2	Pts
Karnataka	5	4	0	0	0	1	0	24
Kerala	5	2	2	0	1	0	0	16
Tamil Nadu	5	1	2	1	0	0	1	13
Andhra	5	1	1	1	1	1	0	9
Hyderabad	5	1	0	0	1	2	1	8
Goa	5	0	0	0	4	1	0	0

West Zone points table
Team	Pld	Wo	W1	A	Lo	L1	W2	Pts
Bombay	4	3	1	0	0	0	0	20
Maharashtra	4	1	2	0	0	1	0	10
Saurashtra	4	1	1	0	0	2	0	8
Baroda	4	0	1	0	0	3	0	2
Gujarat	4	0	0	0	2	2	0	0

== Knockout stage ==
=== Quarter-finals ===
26 February – 2 March 1995
Quarter-final 1
Scorecard

Tamil Nadu	v	Bombay
118 (40.1 overs); V. B. Chandrasekhar 22; Paras Mhambrey 5/53 (15.1 overs)		330 (81.4 overs); Sachin Tendulkar 166; Divakar Vasu 5/107 (26.4 overs)
190 (61.3 overs); Robin Singh 67; Nilesh Kulkarni 5/71 (19 overs)

Bombay won by an innings and 22 runs
Wankhede Stadium, Bombay
Umpires: N. Menon and MSS Ranawat

- Tamil Nadu won the toss and elected to bat.
- Sairaj Bahutule (Bombay) reached 100 wickets in first-class matches.

26 February – 2 March 1995
Quarter-final 2
Scorecard

Delhi	v	Bihar
402 (172.4 overs); Raman Lamba 160; Avinash Kumar 4/129 (62.4 overs)		229 (48 overs); Tariq-ur-Rehman 83*; Ajay Sharma 4/10 (7 overs)
238 (104.4 overs); Manoj Prabhakar 116*; Avinash Kumar 3/54 (31.4 overs)		156/4 (59.3 overs); Tariq-ur-Rehman 50*; Shakti Singh 1/17 (8 overs)

Match drawn
(Delhi won on 1st innings)
Keenan Stadium, Jamshedpur
Umpires: S. Balachandran and Tirumalasetti Sreedhar

- Delhi won the toss and elected to bat.
- Ajay Sharma and Atul Wassan (both Delhi) passed 6,000 and 1,000 runs respectively in first-class matches.

26 February – 2 March 1995
Quarter-final 3
Scorecard

Rajasthan	v	Uttar Pradesh
237 (102.1 overs); Anil Parmar 79; Ashish Zaidi 5/92 (39 overs)		487 (154 overs); Vijay Yadav 141; Mohammad Aslam 4/130 (45 overs)
417/5 (126 overs); Gagan Khoda 237*; S. R. Kesarwani 3/125 (35 overs)

Match drawn
(Uttar Pradesh won on 1st innings)
Ordinance Equipment Factory Ground, Kanpur
Umpires: S. K. Bansal and Vijay Chopra

- Rajasthan won the toss and elected to bat.

26 February – 2 March 1995
Quarter-final 4
Scorecard

Punjab	v	Madhya Pradesh
294 (97.1 overs); Pankaj Dharmani 114; Devashish Nilosey 3/67 (19 overs)		189 (91.2 overs); Amay Khurasiya 43; Obaid Kamal 5/39 (23 overs)
353/5 (102 overs); B. S. Krishna Mohan 101*; Harvinder Sodhi 1/38 (13 overs)

Match drawn
(Punjab won on 1st innings)
Punjab Cricket Association Stadium, Mohali
Umpires: V. K. Ramaswamy and Subroto Porel

- Madhya Pradesh won the toss and elected to field.
- Dinesh Chopra (Madhya Pradesh) made his first-class debut.
- Navjot Singh Sidhu and Ajay Mehra (both Punjab) passed 6,000 and 1,000 runs in first-class matches.

=== Semi-finals ===
12–16 March 1995
1st Semi-final
Scorecard

Uttar Pradesh	v	Bombay
144 (40.3 overs); Saurabh Shukla 72; Paras Mhambrey 3/43 (9 overs)		486 (117.5 overs); Sachin Tendulkar 109; Ashish Zaidi 4/107 (34 overs)
109 f/o (37.1 overs); Vijay Yadav 63; Nilesh Kulkarni 3/6 (3.1 overs)

Bombay won by an innings and 233 runs
Wankhede Stadium, Bombay
Umpires: S. Choudhary and SJ Sambandam

- Uttar Pradesh won the toss and elected to field.
- Sameer Dighe (Bombay) passed 2,000 runs in first-class matches.

12–16 March 1995
2nd Semi-final
Scorecard

Delhi	v	Punjab
554 (197.1 overs); Ajay Sharma 240; Bhupinder Singh 3/101 (35 overs)		780/8 (244.2 overs); Bhupinder Singh 297; Kartar Nath 3/195 (66 overs)

Match drawn
Feroz Shah Kotla, Delhi
Umpires: Suresh Shastri and Arani Jayaprakash

- Delhi won the toss and elected to bat.

=== Final ===
27–31 March 1995
Scorecard

Bombay (H)	v	Punjab
690/6d (168.4 overs); Sanjay Manjrekar 224; Sandeep Sharma 4/155 (38.4 overs)		372 (115.3 overs); Vikram Rathour 177; Abey Kuruvilla 2/41 (16 overs)
513/6d (89.3 overs); Sachin Tendulkar 139; Bharati Vij 3/177 (33.3 overs)		141/2 (28 overs); Pankaj Dharmani 65*; Paras Mhambrey 1/17 (4 overs)

Bombay won on first innings lead
Wankhede Stadium, Bombay
Umpires: S. Balachandran and Subroto Porel

- Punjab won the toss and elected to field.
