= Divakar =

Divakar is an Indian given name. Notable people with the name include:

- Divakar Sharma (born 1933), Indian scholar
- Divakar Vasu (born 1967), Indian cricketer
