= 1999–2000 Duleep Trophy =

39th season of first-class Indian cricket tournament

- Dates: 1 December 1999 – 21 December 1999
- Administrator(s): BCCI
- Cricket format: First-class cricket
- Tournament format(s): Knockout
- Champions: North Zone (13th title)
- Participants: 5
- Matches: 4
- Most runs: Pankaj Dharmani (NZ) (364)
- Most wickets: Robin Singh (NZ) & Nilesh Kulkarni (WZ) (11 each)

The 1999–2000 Duleep Trophy was the 39th season of the Duleep Trophy, a first-class cricket tournament contested by five zonal teams of India: Central Zone, East Zone, North Zone, South Zone and West Zone.

North Zone won the final against West Zone on first innings lead.

== Results ==
Quarterfinal
North Zone	FIL
South Zone

Semifinals
Central Zone
North Zone	FIL
East Zone
West Zone	FIL

Final
North Zone	FIL
West Zone

=== Final ===
17–21 December 1999
Scorecard

North Zone	v	West Zone
468 (161.5 overs); Rajeev Nayyar 105*; Nilesh Kulkarni 5/97		367 (148 overs); Wasim Jaffer 173*; Robin Singh 6/63
248 (73.5 overs); Pankaj Dharmani 93; Zaheer Khan 4/76		64/5 (22 overs); Abhijit Kale 20; Amit Bhandari 3/23

Match drawn; North Zone won on first innings lead
Eden Gardens, Calcutta

- North Zone won the toss and elected to bat.
