= Titan Cup =

International cricket tournament

- Date: 17 October – 6 November 1996
- Location: India
- Result: India won the tri-series
- Player of the series: (India) Anil Kumble
Teams
India	Australia	South Africa
Captains
Sachin Tendulkar	Mark Taylor	Hansie Cronje
Most runs
Sachin Tendulkar (320)	Mark Taylor (302)	Gary Kirsten (307)
Most wickets
Anil Kumble (14)	Paul Reiffel (4); Glenn McGrath (4)	Allan Donald (17)

The Titan Cup was a triangular One Day International cricket tournament held in India between 17 October and 6 November 1996 involving South Africa, Australia and India. Although South Africa had won all its round-robin matches, it lost in the final to India. The tournament was sponsored by and named after Titan Industries (a subsidiary of the Tata Group).

== Background ==
The Titan Cup was held after the inaugural series of the Border–Gavaskar Trophy between India and Australia. It was a one-Test series held in New Delhi, and was won by India, and served as the commencement of South Africa's tour of India later that season. Having won the Pepsi Sharjah Cup and five out of their six matches in the World Cup that year, South Africa were considered favorites to win the competition. They were also coming on the back of winning a four-nation ODI tournament, the Kenya Centenary Cup, where they defeated a strong Pakistan side in the final, and having lost only one game leading into the final, that to world champions Sri Lanka. Captain Hansie Cronje admitted that his side were "in cracking one-day form" before the Titan Cup commenced. Australia, the runners-up in the World Cup, were considered second favorites. India, having not won any ODI competition leading into the tournament, had seen the team captaincy change hands from veteran Mohammad Azharuddin to the then 23-year-old star batsman Sachin Tendulkar.

Before their first game against India, South Africa played a practice game in Gymkhana Ground in Secunderabad dividing themselves into two teams and with members of the Hyderabad, the local first-class team.

== Squads ==
India	Australia	South Africa
Sachin Tendulkar (c); Anil Kumble (vc); Salil Ankola; Mohammad Azharuddin; Pankaj Dharmani; Rahul Dravid; Sourav Ganguly; Ajay Jadeja; Sunil Joshi; Aashish Kapoor; Nayan Mongia (wk); Venkatesh Prasad; Vikram Rathore; Navjot Singh Sidhu; Robin Singh; Sujith Somasunder; Javagal Srinath	Mark Taylor (c); Michael Bevan; Damien Fleming; Adam Gilchrist (wk); Jason Gillespie; Ian Healy (wk); Brad Hogg; Stuart Law; Glenn McGrath; Paul Reiffel; Michael Slater; Shane Warne; Mark Waugh; Steve Waugh	Hansie Cronje (c); Nicky Boje; Derek Crookes; Daryll Cullinan; Fanie de Villiers; Allan Donald; Herschelle Gibbs; Andrew Hudson; Gary Kirsten (vc); Lance Klusener; Brian McMillan; Dave Richardson (wk); Jonty Rhodes; Pat Symcox

The South Africa coaching staff was headed by Bob Woolmer, with Robbie Muzzell accompanying the squad as the manager. The squad arrived in India on 14 October 1996 without their four regular team players: medium pace bowler Craig Matthews, all-rounder Jacques Kallis, all-rounder Shaun Pollock and spinner Paul Adams. Gary Kirsten was named the new vice-captain of the side.

The India team coach was Madan Lal. Karnataka opening batsman Sujith Somasunder made his debut while Tamil Nadu all-rounder Robin Singh made his comeback to the team after 7 years. The squad for their first three games was announced on 13 October 1996. On 23 October, for the remaining three of the group stage games following the loss to South Africa, the Indian selectors brought in Navjot Singh Sidhu in place of Sujith Somasunder.

== Results ==
South Africa won all their round-robin matches against India and Australia. Australia did not win any of their matches, losing two of their encounters against India. In third match, Anil Kumble along with Javagal Srinath helped India to win their ODI match against Australia in Bangalore. The duo added 52 runs for 9th wicket partnership, after Sachin Tendulkar got out at 88 when India was 164/8, chasing a target of 216 runs. The India-Australia match in Cuttack was abandoned due to rain, resulting in both teams getting one point each. In the 9th and last round-robin match, which was a virtual semi-final, India won by 5 runs defending 289, their highest ever total against Australia then. India managed to qualify for the final against South Africa on the strength of their two round-robin victories against Australia.

Team	Pld	W	L	T	NR	Pts	NRR
South Africa	6	6	0	0	0	12	+0.478
India	6	2	3	0	1	5	–0.289
Australia	6	0	5	0	1	1	–0.296
Source: ESPNcricinfo

== Matches ==
17 October (D/N)
Scorecard

South Africa; 261/7 (50 overs)	v	India; 214 (46.3 overs)
Gary Kirsten 84 (81); Anil Kumble 3/42 (10 overs)		Rahul Dravid 62 (87); Allan Donald 3/43 (9 overs)

South Africa won by 47 runs
Lal Bahadur Shastri Stadium, Hyderabad
Umpires: H. S. Sekhon (Ind) and Raman Sharma (Ind)
Player of the match: Gary Kirsten (SA)

- South Africa won the toss and chose to bat.
- Sujith Somasunder (Ind) made his ODI debut.
- Mohammad Azharuddin beat Kapil Dev's record for most appearances for India in ODIs (225).
- Venkatesh Prasad (Ind) claimed his 50th wicket in ODIs.
- Points: India 0, South Africa 2.

Going into the match, South Africa had a marginally better record with nine wins against eight losses over India. Electing to bat first upon winning the toss in front of a 35,000-strong crowd, South Africa got off to a fine start after a maiden over by paceman Javagal Srinath. Openers Gary Kirsten and Andrew Hudson then put together a partnership of 74 at 14 overs. Kirsten particularly punished India's spinner Sunil Joshi during his knock of 81, supported well by Daryll Cullinan (16), who added 43 together for the third wicket. A middle-order collapse — three wickets for 21 runs — was followed by a stand of 76 between Cronje and Brian McMillan. Cronje remained unbeaten at 65 at the end helping take his team to 261 for the loss of seven wickets. Anil Kumble was India's best bowler for the innings picking wickets of Kirsten, pinch-hitter Pat Symcox and Derek Crookes.

India began poorly losing debutante Sujith Somasunder and captain Sachin Tendulkar early, before Mohammad Azharuddin and Rahul Dravid put together 67 runs for the third wicket. Dravid was India's best batsman in the game who made a patient 62 before top-edging Crookes while attempting to sweep him. Sourav Ganguly was involved in a mix-up with Dravid while attempting a sharp single off Fanie de Villiers and crashing into him, before McMillan ran him out. Despite being declared out, South Africa captain Cronje recalled Ganguly, only before he lost his wicket to Allan Donald, who also dismissed Ajay Jadeja. The tail fell cheaply and India were all out for 214, short of the opposition's score by 47 runs. Jonty Rhodes stood out for Cronje's team in the field affecting two run outs, while de Villiers' accurate bowling restricted India's scoring. However, Kirsten's innings of 84 won him the man of the match award.

19 October
Scorecard

Australia; 219/7 (50 overs)	v	South Africa; 220/3 (46.1 overs)
Michael Bevan 56 (76); Allan Donald 3/57 (10 overs)		Gary Kirsten 105 (134); Glenn McGrath 2/42 (10 overs)

South Africa won by 7 wickets
Nehru Stadium, Indore
Umpires: Subroto Banerjee (Ind) and Suresh Deo (Ind)
Player of the match: Gary Kirsten (SA)

- Australia won the toss and chose to bat.
- Points: Australia 0, South Africa 2.

21 October
Scorecard

Australia; 215/7 (50 overs)	v	India; 216/8 (48.5 overs)
Mark Taylor 105 (144); Venkatesh Prasad 3/37 (10 overs)		Sachin Tendulkar 88 (111); Damien Fleming 2/39 (10 overs)

India won by 2 wickets
M. Chinnaswamy Stadium, Bangalore
Umpires: S. K. Bansal (Ind) and Subroto Porel (Ind)
Player of the match: Sachin Tendulkar (Ind)

- Australia won the toss and chose to bat.
- Mark Taylor (Aus) scored his maiden century in ODIs.
- The match was suspended for 20 minutes due to crowd trouble.
- Points: Australia 0, India 2.

23 October
Scorecard

South Africa; 249/6 (50 overs)	v	India; 222/7 (50 overs)
Daryll Cullinan 106 (130); Ajay Jadeja 2/47 (8 overs)		Sachin Tendulkar 64 (93); Brian McMillan 3/32 (9 overs)

South Africa won by 27 runs
Sawai Mansingh Stadium, Jaipur
Umpires: S. Choudhary (Ind) and Jose Kurushinkal (Ind)
Player of the match: Daryll Cullinan (SA)

- India won the toss and chose to field.
- Pankaj Dharmani (Ind) made his debut in ODIs.
- Points: India 0, South Africa 2.

25 October
Scorecard

Australia; 215 (47.3 overs)	v	South Africa; 218/8 (47.2 overs)
Stuart Law 52 (51); Allan Donald 4/31 (8.3 overs)		Daryll Cullinan 71 (115); Paul Reiffel 4/35 (10 overs)

South Africa won by 2 wickets
Nahar Singh Stadium, Faridabad
Umpires: B. Jamula (Ind) and M. R. Singh (Ind)
Player of the match: Daryll Cullinan (SA)

- Australia won the toss and chose to bat.
- Adam Gilchrist (Aus) made his ODI debut.
- Points: Australia 0, South Africa 2.

27 October
Scorecard

India	v	Australia

No result
Barabati Stadium, Cuttack

- No toss made.
- Match abandoned due to rain.

29 October
Scorecard

India; 185 (48.1 overs)	v	South Africa; 188/5 (48.4 overs)
Javagal Srinath 53 (69); Allan Donald 3/31 (9.1 overs)		Jonty Rhodes 54 (81); Sunil Joshi 2/32 (10 overs)

South Africa won by 5 wickets
Municipal Stadium, Rajkot
Umpires: Vijay Chopra (Ind) and Surya Prakash Rao (Ind)
Player of the match: Jonty Rhodes (SA)

- India won the toss and chose to bat.
- Points: India 0, South Africa 2.

1 November
Scorecard

Australia; 238/6 (50 overs)	v	South Africa; 239/2 (45 overs)
Michael Bevan 79 (95); Nicky Boje 2/43 (10 overs)		Lance Klusener 88 (99); Brad Hogg 1/42 (8 overs)

South Africa won by 8 wickets
Nehru Stadium, Guwahati
Umpires: Bala Murali (Ind) and K. Parthasarathy (Ind)
Player of the match: Pat Symcox (SA)

- Australia won the toss and chose to bat.
- Points: Australia 0, South Africa 2.

3 November (D/N)
Scorecard

India; 289/6 (50 overs)	v	Australia; 284 (49.1 overs)
Mohammad Azharuddin 94 (104); Mark Waugh 2/38 (9 overs)		Mark Taylor 78 (92); Anil Kumble 3/42 (10 overs)

India won by 5 runs
Punjab Cricket Association Stadium, Chandigarh
Umpires: AV Jayaprakash (Ind) and S. K. Sharma (Ind)
Player of the match: Mohammad Azharuddin (Ind)

- Australia won the toss and chose to field.
- Points: Australia 0, India 2.

=== Final ===
6 November
14:30 IST (D/N)
Scorecard

India; 220/7 (50 overs)	v	South Africa; 185 (47.2 overs)
Sachin Tendulkar 67 (88); Fanie de Villiers 3/32 (10 overs)		Pat Symcox 46 (61); Anil Kumble 4/25 (8.2 overs)

India won by 35 runs
Wankhede Stadium, Mumbai
Umpires: V. K. Ramaswamy (Ind) and S. Venkataraghavan (Ind)
Player of the match: Anil Kumble (Ind)

- India won the toss and chose to bat.
- India won the Titan Cup.

== Records and awards ==
India's Titan Cup win was its first ODI tournament victory in 1996, as well as the first under captain Sachin Tendulkar. Tendulkar was the lead run-scorer in the tournament, with 320 runs in 6 innings. With 17 wickets, Allan Donald of South Africa won the player of the series award.

== Broadcast ==
It was announced in October 1996 that the tournament would be broadcast live on ESPN and Doordarshan in Indian television.
