= 1991–92 Ranji Trophy =

1991-92 Ranji Trophy
- The Ranji Trophy, which the winners get.
- Administrator: BCCI
- Cricket format: First-class cricket
- Tournament format(s): League and knockout
- Champions: Delhi (6th title)
- Participants: 27
- Most runs: Ajay Sharma (Delhi) (933)
- Most wickets: Maninder Singh (Delhi) (58)

The 1991–92 Ranji Trophy was the 58th season of the Ranji Trophy. Delhi won the final against Tamil Nadu.

== Group stage ==
=== North Zone ===
Team	Pld	W	L	D	T	NR	Pts	RR
Delhi	5	4	0	1	0	0	102	3.597
Haryana	5	3	0	2	0	0	97	3.307
Punjab	5	3	1	1	0	0	84	3.454
Jammu and Kashmir	5	1	4	0	0	0	44	3.423
Services	5	2	3	0	0	0	37	2.869
Himachal Pradesh	5	0	5	0	0	0	25	2.953

=== West Zone ===
Team	Pld	W	L	D	T	NR	Pts	RR
Bombay	4	1	0	3	0	0	72	3.584
Maharashtra	4	2	1	1	0	0	59	3.740
Saurashtra	4	0	0	4	0	0	53	3.187
Baroda	4	0	1	3	0	0	46	3.098
Gujarat	4	0	1	3	0	0	36	2.914

=== East Zone ===
Team	Pld	W	L	D	T	NR	Pts	RR
Bengal	4	2	0	2	0	0	69	3.945
Bihar	4	2	0	2	0	0	67	2.644
Orissa	4	2	1	1	0	0	50	3.013
Assam	4	1	2	1	0	0	46	3.265
Tripura	4	0	4	0	0	0	12	2.562

=== South Zone ===
Team	Pld	W	L	D	T	NR	Pts	RR
Hyderabad	5	2	0	3	0	0	92	3.450
Tamil Nadu	5	3	1	1	0	0	88	3.286
Karnataka	5	4	0	1	0	0	88	3.003
Kerala	5	2	2	1	0	0	52	3.388
Andhra	5	1	4	0	0	0	35	2.661
Goa	5	0	5	0	0	0	20	2.692

=== Central Zone ===
Team	Pld	W	L	D	T	NR	Pts	RR
Uttar Pradesh	4	1	0	3	0	0	66	3.468
Madhya Pradesh	4	1	0	3	0	0	58	3.755
Railways	4	2	0	2	0	0	54	2.952
Rajasthan	4	0	1	3	0	0	34	2.821
Vidarbha	4	0	3	1	0	0	26	3.101

== Knockout stage ==
Pre-Quarter-finals
15 Feb 1992 — Secunderabad
Hyderabad	409 & 249
Madhya Pradesh	535 & 127/3
13 Feb 1992 — Pune
Maharashtra (F)	757/7d
Bihar	270 & 424/7

Quarter-finals
28 Feb 1992 — Bombay
Bombay	721/8d
Madhya Pradesh	230 & 373
28 Feb 1992 — Delhi
Delhi	636
Bengal	237 & 228
28 Feb 1992 — Pune
Maharashtra	557
Haryana (F)	673/9d & 95/0
28 Feb 1992 — Kanpur
Uttar Pradesh	203 & 77/0
Tamil Nadu (F)	349 & 628

Semi-finals
13 Mar 1992 — Bombay
Bombay	254 & 182/3
Delhi (F)	516 & 574
13 Mar 1992 — Faridabad
Haryana	375 & 233/7
Tamil Nadu (F)	507 & 340

Finals
27 Mar 1992 — Delhi
Delhi (F)	532 & 273/4
Tamil Nadu	449

(F) - Advanced to next round / won the finals on First Innings Lead

=== Final ===
27–31 March 1992
Scorecard

Delhi (H)	v	Tamil Nadu
532 (172.2 overs); Ajay Sharma 175 (330); Divakar Vasu 4/106 (42 overs)		449 (154.1 overs); Woorkeri Raman 82 (191); Maninder Singh 5/130 (51.1 overs)
273/4 (84 overs); Bantoo Singh 123* (212); M. Venkataramana 2/74 (19 overs)

Match drawn (Delhi won on first innings lead)
Feroz Shah Kotla, Delhi
Umpires: S. B. Kulkarni and R. S. Rathore

- Delhi won the toss and elected to bat.
- Divakar Vasu (Tamil Nadu) passed 1,000 runs each and Robin Singh (Tamil Nadu) passed 3,000 runs in first-class cricket.

== Scorecards and averages ==
- CricketArchive
