= Sujith Somasunder =

Indian cricket player

Sujith Somasundar
Personal information
- Full name: Sujith Bijjahalli Somasunder
- Born: 2 December 1972 (age 53); Bangalore, Karnataka, India
- Batting: Right-handed
- Bowling: Right-arm medium

International information
- National side: India (1996)
- ODI debut (cap 99): 17 October 1996 v South Africa
- Last ODI: 21 October 1996 v Australia

Domestic team information
- Years: Team
- 1991–2000: Karnataka
- 2001–2002: Saurashtra
- 2002–2003: Kerala
- 2004–2006: Karnataka

Career statistics
Competition	ODI	FC	LA
Matches	2	99	66
Runs scored	16	5,525	2,121
Batting average	8.00	35.64	34.77
100s/50s	0/0	11/30	6/6
Top score	9	222	152
Balls bowled	–	1074	257
Wickets	–	14	5
Bowling average	–	34.92	45.40
5 wickets in innings	–	0	0
10 wickets in match	–	0	0
Best bowling	–	3/15	3/12
Catches/stumpings	0/–	93/–	22/–
- Source: ESPNcricinfo, 6 March 2006

Sujith Bijjahalli Somasundar (born 2 December 1972) is an Indian former cricketer who played domestic cricket for Karnataka and played two One Day Internationals for India in 1996.

== Early domestic career ==
Somasundar got his chance on the basis of some fine performances in the domestic circuit with Karnataka. A gutsy batsman, Somasundar made his first appearance for Karnataka in the 1990–91 season of the Ranji Trophy. He played his first game against Maharashtra in February 1991 alongside another debutante and future India teammate Rahul Dravid. He made scores of 29 and 27 not out in the two innings. He played only one game in the following season, against Tamil Nadu, and returned figures of 3/15 in five overs. When no chances came his way to assure himself a permanent spot in the Karnataka side, Somasundar was backed by former India cricketer Gundappa Viswanath, who was impressed by the former while they played for City Cricketers, a local club. Viswanath's pushing his case and the retirement of Carlton Saldanha, an opening batsman for Karnataka, created a place in the side for Somasundar again.

He flowered in 1994–95 when, pushed to open the batting, he responded immediately by scoring a century against Goa. Somasundar was a key member for Karnataka during the 1995–96 Ranji Trophy season. He hit two centuries and five half centuries to play a leading role in Karnataka's triumph in the Ranji Trophy. In the final, he made 99 and 53. He aggregated 803 runs at 61.76 for the season.

== International call-up ==
After impressive performances in the domestic tournaments, Somasundar was called up to the Indian national team for the Titan Cup, a triangular One Day International (ODI) series that also featured South Africa and Australia. He made his debut against South Africa in the first game at Hyderabad. He only managed to score 9, before being run out by Daryll Cullinan. His next ODI would be his last; playing against Australia at his home ground, Chinnaswamy Stadium in Bangalore, Somasundar was dismissed by paceman Glenn McGrath for 7. He was subsequently dropped from the side and was replaced by Navjot Singh Sidhu for the rest of the games.

== Later domestic career ==
Rejected by the national selectors, Somasundar continued to be in good form and in the 1997–98 season, aggregated 629 runs. This was followed by a fine performance the next year when he helped Karnataka to another Ranji Trophy triumph by scoring 529 runs. In the 1998 final against Uttar Pradesh, Somasundar scored a fine 68. During the 1990s, He was part of a Karnataka setup that contributed many players to the Indian team like Anil Kumble, Javagal Srinath, Rahul Dravid, Venkatesh Prasad, David Johnson, Dodda Ganesh and Sunil Joshi.

In 2002, playing for Kerala, he scored his highest first class score of 222 against Tripura. He scored over 1000 runs that season which was the highest aggregate by any batsmen that year. He turned out for Saurashtra in the final years of his career and retired in 2007. From November 2006 till May 2012, Sujith Somasundar worked as a Behavioural Expert & a Leadership Training Consultant for Wipro Technologies and was responsible for transforming the performance of their Business leaders and managers. From June 2012 till March 2014, he was associated with Kerala Cricket Association as a head coach. In the first year as their Coach, Kerala performed exceptionally well by being the Runners-up in both the Vijay Hazare Trophy(50 Overs Format) & the Ghulam Ahmed Trophy (20 Overs Format) conducted by the BCCI. He is also a part-time sports psychologist having trained under Dr. Patrick Cohn, a recognized sports psychologist in the United States.
