= Devashish Nilosey =

Indian cricketer and coach (born 1964)

Personal information
- Born: 4 December 1964 (age 61); Indore, India
- Source: ESPNcricinfo, 5 April 2021

Devashish Krishnakant Nilosey (born 4 December 1964) is an Indian cricketer and coach. He played in 46 first-class and 16 List A matches for Madhya Pradesh from 1984/85 to 1995/96. He was an all-rounder. As a batsman, he scored over 200 runs, including three centuries. His top score was 128, against Railways in December 1994. He was a right-arm seam bowler, whose best bowling performance was ten wickets against Vidarbha in November 1991. He holds the record for the worst economy rate in a Ranji Trophy season, with 4.54 in 1992/93.

Nilosey later coached Madhya Pradesh, as well as the India national under-19 cricket team.

== See also ==
- List of Madhya Pradesh cricketers
