= K. V. P. Rao =

Indian cricketer

Personal information
- Full name: Kasireddi Var Prasad Rao
- Born: 21 November 1965 (age 60); Jamshedpur, Bihar, India
- Nickname: Vara
- Batting: Right-handed
- Bowling: Slow left-arm orthodox
- Role: Bowler

Domestic team information
- Years: Team
- 1987/88–1999/00: Bihar

Career statistics
Competition	FC	List A
Matches	54	27
Runs scored	441	59
Batting average	9.18	6.55
100s/50s	0/1	0/0
Top score	72	11
Balls bowled	13,065	2,054
Wickets	212	38
Bowling average	24.13	25.07
5 wickets in innings	15	1
10 wickets in match	3	n/a
Best bowling	7/74	5/24
Catches/stumpings	32/–	12/–
- Source: ESPNcricinfo, 10 January 2016

Kasireddi Var Prasad Rao (born 11 November 1965), commonly known as K. V. P. Rao, is a former Indian first-class cricketer who played for Bihar between the 1987/88 and 1999/00 seasons. After retirement, he worked in administrative roles for the Board of Control for Cricket in India. Manager KVP Rao, in charge of domestic cricket, has been sacked by the BCCI in an AGM, dated 24th Dec 2020. BCCI has terminated KVP Rao from all cricket operations.

== Life and career ==
During his playing career, Rao played for Bihar and East Zone, between the 1987–88 and 1999–00, as a slow left-arm orthodox bowler. He was the leading wicket-taker of 1994–95 Ranji Trophy with 36 wickets at an average of 14.75 including five five-wicket hauls and two ten-wicket hauls. He captained Bihar from 1996 to 1998.

A level-3 cricket coach, Rao was appointed by the Board of Control for Cricket in India as its game development manager in 2010. He became an administrator of the National Cricket Academy in 2013. In 2015, he was named in a five-man ad-hoc panel to oversee cricket affairs in the state of Uttarakhand.
