= Kartik Jeshwant =

Indian cricketer (born 1964)

Personal information
- Full name: Kartik Achuta Jeshwant
- Born: 27 September 1964 (age 62); Mangalore, Karnataka, India
- Batting: Left-handed
- Bowling: Slow left-arm orthodox
- Role: All-rounder

Domestic team information
- Years: Team
- 1985/86-1995/96: Karnataka

Career statistics
| Competition | FC | List A |
|---|---|---|
| Matches | 68 | 26 |
| Runs scored | 3,905 | 378 |
| Batting average | 43.38 | 19.89 |
| 100s/50s | 9/19 | 0/1 |
| Top score | 259* | 84 |
| Balls bowled | 5,642 | 875 |
| Wickets | 105 | 21 |
| Bowling average | 25.62 | 30.80 |
| 5 wickets in innings | 4 | 0 |
| 10 wickets in match | 0 | n/a |
| Best bowling | 6/24 | 3/28 |
| Catches/stumpings | 34/– | 11/– |
- Source: ESPNcricinfo, 3 January 2016

Kartik Jeshwant (born 27 September 1964) is a former Indian first-class cricketer who played for Karnataka cricket team from 1985/86 to 1995/96. He worked as a cricket coach after retirement and became the head coach of the Karnataka team twice. He also became a cricket commentator in Kannada-language.

== Life and career ==
Kartik Jeshwant was born on 27 September 1964 in Mangalore. He studied in St. Joseph's Boys' High School, Bangalore.

Jeshwant played for Karnataka as an all-rounder who batted left-handed and bowled slow left-arm orthodox. He also captained Karnataka and appeared for South Zone cricket team. Jeshwant appeared in 68 first-class matches, scoring close to 4000 runs and taking over 100 wickets. He appeared for Rest of India in the 1988–89 Irani Cup match against Tamil Nadu. His highest first-class score of 259 not out came against Tamil Nadu at Coimbatore in December 1990 and was the highest score by a Karnataka batsman against Tamil Nadu until 2015. He was part of the Karnataka team that won the 1995–96 Ranji Trophy, which was also his last season in first-class cricket.

Jeshwant was the head coach of Karnataka for two seasons in the early-2000s. He became the head coach again for the 2011/12 season.
