= Rajeev Nayyar =

Indian cricketer

Personal information
- Born: 28 March 1968 (age 58); Chamba, Himachal Pradesh, India
- Batting: Right-handed
- Bowling: Leg break googly
- Role: Batsman

Domestic team information
- Years: Team
- 1986–2006: Himachal Pradesh

Career statistics
Competition	FC	List A
Matches	96	50
Runs scored	6,881	1,142
Batting average	44.97	32.62
100s/50s	20/32	0/10
Top score	271	87
Balls bowled	3,239	619
Wickets	39	17
Bowling average	52.23	33.35
5 wickets in innings	2	0
10 wickets in match	0	n/a
Best bowling	7/93	4/17
Catches/stumpings	53/–	22/–
- Source: ESPNcricinfo, 18 December 2016

Rajeev Nayyar (born 28 March 1968) is a former Indian first-class cricketer who played for Himachal Pradesh. In 1999, he set the record for the longest first-class innings of all time by batting for 1,015 minutes (16 hours and 55 minutes) in a Ranji Trophy match against Jammu and Kashmir.

== Career ==
Nayyar was born on 28 March 1968 in the town of Chamba. He made his first-class debut at the age of 18 for his home state Himachal Pradesh during the 1986–87 Ranji Trophy, one year after the state was granted BCCI's accreditation. A right-handed middle-order batsman, Nayyar went on to represent Himachal Pradesh for 20 seasons and also served as its captain in several matches. He appeared in 96 first-class matches and scored 6,881 runs, at an average close to 45, with 20 hundreds. He scored the first hundred by a Himachal Pradesh batsman in 1988 and captained the team to its maiden win in a Ranji Trophy match in 1990. He also bowled part-time leg spin, picking 39 first-class wickets including two five-wicket hauls and was the first Himachal Pradesh bowler to take seven wickets in an innings.

During the 1995–96 Ranji Trophy, Nayyar scored three back-to-back hundreds and earned a place in the North Zone team. He then played for India A in 1996 in a match against the touring South African team. Playing for North Zone in the 1999–2000 Duleep Trophy, he had scores of 118 against South Zone, 88 against Central Zone in the semifinal and 105 not out in the final against West Zone.

Nayyar played his last first-class match in January 2006 and announced his retirement in December 2008.

=== Longest first-class innings ===
Nayyar shot to fame in November 1999, when he broke the record for the longest innings in the history of first-class cricket. He batted for 1,015 minutes in his innings of 271 against Jammu and Kashmir during a match of the 1999–00 Ranji Trophy in his home ground Chamba, breaking the previous record of 970 minutes set by Pakistan's Hanif Mohammad in a Test against the West Indies in 1958. Nayyar, captain of Himachal Pradesh, began his innings at the fall of his team's first wicket in the 11th over on the second day of the match. He reached 89 at the close of the second day's play and was batting on 170 at stumps on day three. On the fourth and final day's play, he became the first batsman from Himachal Pradesh to score a first-class double hundred and was dismissed bowled for 271 from 728 balls in the 250th over of Himachal Pradesh's innings. As of December 2021, Nayyar's innings remains the only instance in which a batsman has batted for more than 1000 minutes in an innings in first-class cricket.

== Personal life ==
Nayyar has an MBA degree from the National University of Shimla. After his playing career, he worked as director at the Swami Devidayal College in Panchkula. As of October 2016, he works as a selector for the Himachal Pradesh Cricket Association.
