= Vijendra Yadav =

Indian cricketer (born 1973)

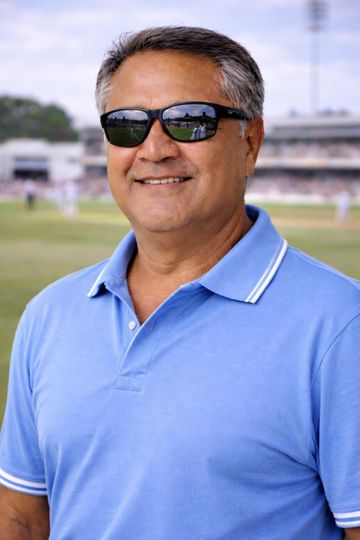
- Vijendra Yadav in 2026

Personal information
- Born: 21 July 1973 (age 53); Delhi, India
- Batting: Right-handed
- Source: ESPNcricinfo, 30 November 2016

Vijendra Yadav (born 21 July 1973) is an Indian first-class cricketer who represented Rajasthan. He made his first-class debut for Rajasthan in the 1990–91 Ranji Trophy on 27 December 1990. He has played for both Rajasthan and Railways in first-class cricket. On June 16, 2026, he was appointed as the Chairperson of the Rajasthan Senior Men's Selection Committee panel by RCA (Rajasthan Cricket Association).
