= Tariq-ur-Rehman =

Indian cricketer

Personal information
- Born: 28 February 1974 (age 52); Darbhanga, Bihar, India
- Batting: Left-handed
- Bowling: Slow left-arm orthodox

Domestic team information
- Years: Team
- 1993/94–2002/03: Bihar
- 1999/00: Assam
- 2004/05: Tripura
- 2006/07: Jharkhand

Career statistics
Competition	FC	List A
Matches	59	45
Runs scored	3,195	1,189
Batting average	38.49	40.75
100s/50s	5/23	1/10
Top score	122	101*
Balls bowled	1,427	792
Wickets	16	12
Bowling average	45.62	49.50
5 wickets in innings	0	0
10 wickets in match	0	n/a
Best bowling	4/60	3/31
Catches/stumpings	43/–	16/–
- Source: ESPNcricinfo, 5 April 2016

Tariq-ur-Rehman (born 22 February 1974) is an Indian former first-class cricketer who played most of his cricket for Bihar. He also coached Air India cricket team as well as Saudi Arabian cricketers after his playing career.

== Career ==
A left-handed batsman and occasional slow left-arm orthodox bowler, Tariq-ur-Rehman played 59 first-class and 45 List A matches for various teams. He appeared for his state team Bihar between 1993/94 and 2002/03, and also represented Assam, Tripura and Jharkhand for one season each. He scored more than 3000 first-class runs and over 1000 runs in List A cricket, and also captained Bihar and Tripura in a few matches. He made appearances for East Zone in the late-1990s. He played his last first-class match in December 2006.

Tariq-ur-Rehman became a cricket coach after retirement. He coached Air India cricket team in the BCCI Corporate Trophy. He then coached Saudi Arabian cricketers and was the coach of the Saudi Arabia Under-19 cricket team that won the 2011 ACC Under-19 Challenge Cup in Kuala Lumpur.
