= Harvinder Sodhi =

Indian cricketer (born 1971)

Harvinder Singh Sodhi
Personal information
- Full name: Harvinder Singh Sodhi
- Born: 17 October 1971 (age 55); Agra, Uttar Pradesh, India
- Height: 6 ft 3 in (1.91 m)
- Batting: Right-handed
- Bowling: Right-arm medium
- Role: All-rounder

Domestic team information
- Years: Team
- 1990/91–2003/04: Madhya Pradesh

Career statistics
| Competition | First-class | List A |
|---|---|---|
| Matches | 75 | 55 |
| Runs scored | 2,072 | 311 |
| Batting average | 24.09 | 15.55 |
| 100s/50s | 2/12 | 0/0 |
| Top score | 120* | 33* |
| Balls bowled | 11,366 | 2,452 |
| Wickets | 174 | 65 |
| Bowling average | 31.38 | 27.44 |
| 5 wickets in innings | 5 | 1 |
| 10 wickets in match | 0 | 0 |
| Best bowling | 6/24 | 6/34 |
| Catches/stumpings | 17/– | 8/– |
- Source: CricketArchive, 26 February 2016

Harvinder Singh Sodhi (born 17 October 1971) is a former Indian first-class cricketer who played for Madhya Pradesh cricket team between the 1990/91 and 2003/04 seasons.

Sodhi played as an all-rounder who batted right-hand and bowled right-arm medium. He appeared in 76 first-class and 55 List A matches in a career spanning 13 years between 1990/91 and 2003/04. Besides the Madhya Pradesh cricket team, Sodhi played for Central Zone cricket team from 1990/91 to 1999/00, and Rest of India in 1999/00.

After his playing career, Sodhi turned to coaching. He was appointed Madhya Pradesh cricket team's assistant coach and now currently indian cricket team junior selector.
