= Divakar Sharma =

Indian scholar (born 1933)

Divakar Sharma (born 5 April 1933) was an Indian scholar of Sanskrit, Hindi and Rajasthani languages.

== Biography ==
Born in Churu, India, Sharma received his Master of Arts (M.A.) from Kota and a Doctor of Philosophy (Ph.D.) degree from the University of Rajasthan, Jaipur. Divakar Sharma received his tutelage in history and culture from his father, the Sanskrit scholar Vidyavachaspati Vidyadhar Shastri and his father's younger brother, Professor Dasharatha Sharma.

Divakar Sharma was appointed as lecturer in Sanskrit at the Dungar College, Bikaner and retired from that position in 1991. He then headed an institution for research and promotion of Sanskrit, Hindi and Rajasthani literature, the Hindi Vishwa Bharati Anusandhan Parishad, Bikaner. Additionally he was the editor of the institution's principal research publication Vishwambhara.

== Editorial responsibilities ==
Divakar Sharma was the editor of the quarterly Hindi Vishwa Bharati publication Vishwambhara. For an extended period, he was also the editor of the Rajasthani Gyanpith Sansthan's principal periodical Rajasthani Ganga. He also served on the editorial boards of the periodicals Varada, Vaicharaki and Kala-Darshan.

== Honors ==
He was honored at the Vishisht Vidvat Samman by the Rajasthan Sanskrit Academy, Jaipur and as Vishist Sahityakar by the Rajasthan Sahitya Academy, Udaipur. Numerous cultural and literary organizations of Rajasthan also conferred honors on him. He became famous at Reality Musical Game Show

== Memberships ==
Divakar Sharma is a member of the Board of Directors of the Rajasthan Sahitya Academy, Udaipur and treasurer of the Rajasthani Language and Culture Academy. He was a member and official of many other literary and cultural organizations.

== Bibliography ==
- Rajasthan ke Sanskrit sahitya-srajan mein Bikaner kshetra ka yogdan, 1472-1965 (Rajasthan's contribution to Sanskrit literature with special reference to Bikaner 1472-1965 A.D.), in Hindi, includes passages in Sanskrit. Publisher: Kalasan Prakashan, Bikaner 2008
- Vichitra Patram
- Dasharatha Sharma lekha-sangraha ( Selected articles from writings of Dasharatha Sharma, Hindi author and historian) in Hindi Editors: Divakar Sharma, Manohar Sharma. Publisher: Hindi Visvabharati Anusandhan Parishad, Bikaner 1977
- Giradhari Singh Parihar: vyaktitva aur krititva (On the works of Giradhariisingh Paṛihar, Rajasthani and Hindi poet; includes selections from his works) in Rajasthani language. Publisher: Rajasthani Gyanpith Sansthan, Bikaner 2001
