= Pankaj Dharmani =

Indian cricketer (born 1974)

Personal information
- Full name: Pankaj Dharmani
- Born: 27 September 1974 (age 52); Delhi, India
- Batting: Right-handed
- Role: Wicket-keeper

International information
- National side: India
- Only ODI (cap 100): 23 October 1996 v South Africa
- Source: ESPNcricinfo, 6 March 2006

Pankaj Dharmani (born 27 September 1974) is a former Indian cricketer. He played domestic cricket for Punjab and played a single One Day International for India against South Africa in 1996.

A wicket-keeper, Pankaj Dharmani made his debut for Punjab in the 1992–93 Ranji Trophy final against Maharashtra. But he managed to cement his place in the state side only during the 1994–95 season. He was selected to represent the Indian team for the Titan Cup in 1996 after consistent performances both with the bat and behind the stumps. He failed in the single game he played but was picked for the tour of South Africa which followed as a batsman. He however did little of note in the limited opportunities he got and has been forgotten ever since.

Dharmani continued to be a regular in the state Ranji side and by now he was mainly a batsman. He not only showcased his ability to make runs, but also displayed the temperament to spend long hours at the crease and score heavily. In the 1999–2000 first class season, he scored 1194 runs in 13 matches. In the Ranji Trophy alone he aggregated 830 runs from 10 matches with scores of 70, 305 not out, 202 not out and 101. This included a run of 608 runs without being dismissed. In Punjab's 2007 Ranji Trophy season opener against Andhra, Dharmani became the highest overall run-scorer for his state in the competition. He was included in the Kings XI Punjab squad at the inaugural IPL.
