= Paras Mhambrey =

Indian cricketer (born 1972)

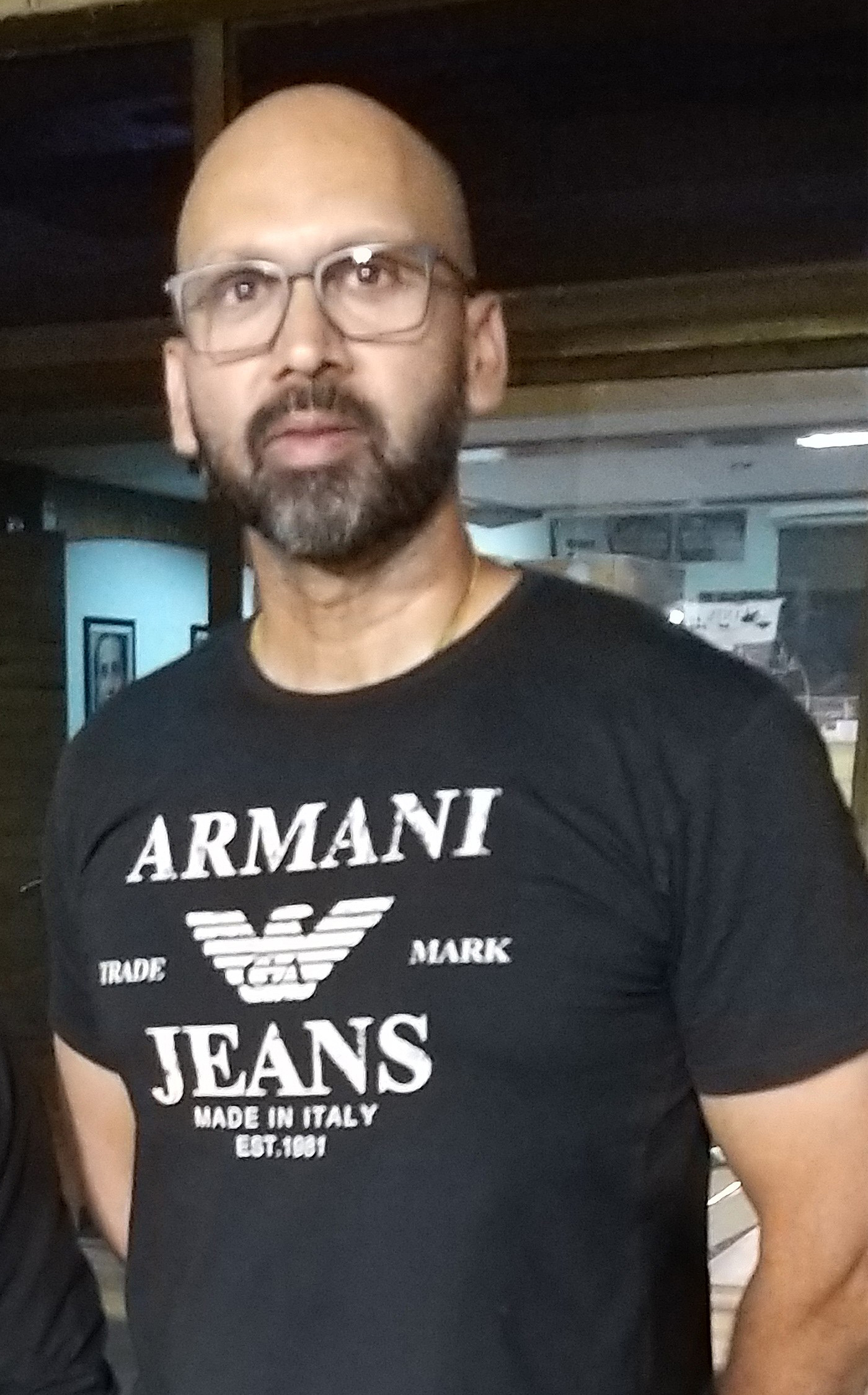

Personal information
- Full name: Paras Laxmikant Mhambrey
- Born: 20 June 1972 (age 54); Bombay, India
- Batting: Right-handed
- Bowling: Right-arm fast-medium
- Role: Bowler

Career statistics
Competition	Test	ODI
Matches	2	3
Runs scored	58	7
Batting average	29.00	2.5
100s/50s	0/0	0/0
Top score	28	7
Balls bowled	258	126
Wickets	2	3
Bowling average	74.00	40.00
5 wickets in innings	0	0
10 wickets in match	0	0
Best bowling	1/43	2/69
Catches/stumpings	1/–	0/–
- Source: CricInfo, 4 February 2006

Paras Laxmikant Mhambrey (born 20 June 1972) is a former Indian cricketer who played in two Test matches and three One Day Internationals between 1996 and 1998.

== Playing career ==
In 1993–94, Mhambrey made his debut took 30 wickets at 23.77 apiece and selected to the India A side in the next season.

Mhambrey made his debut against England at Edgbaston as a third seamer in 1996 and picked up Michael Atherton as his first wicket, however he could not do much with the ball and ended up with only 2 wickets in his only series. He was also selected as the overseas player for North Maidenhead CC.

He retired from first-class cricket in May 2003.

== Coaching career ==
Paras Mhambrey secured a Level-3 coaching diploma from the National Cricket Academy (NCA) in Bangalore.

He was the coach of the cricket team of Bengal in Indian domestic circuit (2005–2007) and took them to the finals of the Ranji Trophy, after a gap of 16 years. He was also the coach of Maharashtra (2003–2005), Baroda and Vidarbha.

He has had a long-time association with the Mumbai Indians, initially joining them as a support staff member for the inaugural 2008 Indian Premier League season. He became MI's assistant coach in 2010, departing the franchise in 2017. He served as MI's bowling coach between 2024 and 2026.

He served as bowling coach for both the India A and India U19 cricket teams from July 2015 until November 2021 (having previously served as India A coach in 2007), before becoming bowling coach of the Indian national cricket team under Rahul Dravid, concluding at the end of Dravid's tenure in August 2024.
