= Chandra Sathe =

Indian cricket umpire (1947–2017)

Chandrakant Krishna Sathe
Personal information
- Born: 31 October 1947; Pune, India
- Died: 3 August 2017 (aged 69)

Umpiring information
- ODIs umpired: 5 (1993–2000)
- Source: ESPNcricinfo, 29 May 2014

Chandra Kant Sathe (31 October 1947 – 3 August 2017) was an Indian cricket umpire. In his international umpiring career, he stood in five ODI games between 1993 and 2000.

== See also ==
- List of One Day International cricket umpires
