= Sridharan Sharath =

Indian cricketer (born 1972)

Sridharan Sharath (born 31 October 1972) is an Indian former cricketer who played first class cricket for the Tamil Nadu cricket team. He is current national cricket selector. He is a left-handed batsman and in 134 first class matches he made 8390 runs at 51.47 with 28 hundreds, making him one of the most prolific batsman in Indian domestic cricket history. Although he never represented his country at Test or ODI cricket, he did get to play for India A on numerous occasions. He is the only Tamil Nadu player to have played 100 Ranji Trophy matches.
