= Anil Kumble =

Indian cricketer (born 1970)

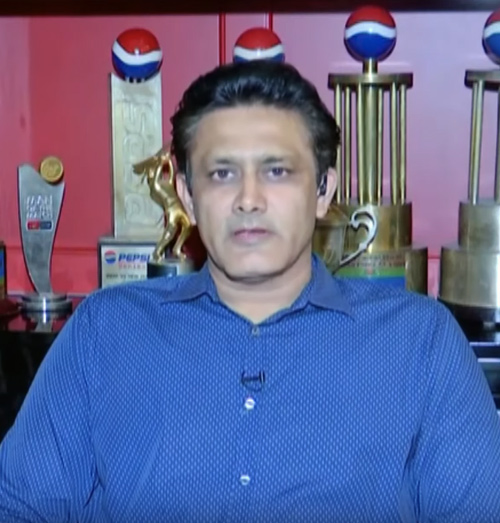
- Kumble in October 2019

Personal information
- Born: 17 October 1970 (age 56); Bangalore, Mysore State (now Karnataka), India
- Nickname: Jumbo
- Batting: Right-handed
- Bowling: Leg break
- Role: Bowler

International information
- National side: India (1990–2008)
- Test debut (cap 192): 9 August 1990 v England
- Last Test: 29 October 2008 v Australia
- ODI debut (cap 78): 25 April 1990 v Sri Lanka
- Last ODI: 19 March 2007 v Bermuda
- ODI shirt no.: 37 (previously 18, 8)

Domestic team information
- Years: Team
- 1989/90–2008/09: Karnataka
- 1995: Northamptonshire
- 2000: Leicestershire
- 2006: Surrey
- 2008–2010: Royal Challengers Bangalore

Career statistics
Competition	Test	ODI	FC	LA
Matches	132	271	244	380
Runs scored	2506	938	5572	1456
Batting average	17.77	10.53	21.77	11.20
100s/50s	1/5	0/0	7/17	0/0
Top score	110*	26	154*	30*
Balls bowled	40,850	14,496	66,931	20,247
Wickets	619	337	1136	514
Bowling average	29.65	30.89	25.83	27.58
5 wickets in innings	35	2	72	3
10 wickets in match	8	0	20	0
Best bowling	10/74	6/12	10/74	6/12
Catches/stumpings	60/–	85/–	120/–	122/–
Medal record
Men's Cricket
Representing India
ICC Cricket World Cup
Runner-up	2003 South Africa-Zimbabwe-Kenya
ICC Champions Trophy
Winner	2002 Sri Lanka
Runner-up	2000 Kenya
ACC Asia Cup
Winner	1995 United Arab Emirates
Runner-up	1997 Sri Lanka
Runner-up	2004 Sri Lanka
Representing India as Coach
ICC Champions Trophy
Runner-up	2017 England and Wales
- Source: espncricinfo, 8 November 2016

Anil Kumble (IPA: [ənɪl kʊmbleː]; born 17 October 1970) is a former Indian cricketer, captain, coach and commentator who played Test and One Day International cricket for his national team over an international career of 18 years. A right-arm leg spin bowler, regarded as one of the greatest spin bowlers in cricket history, he took 619 wickets in Test cricket and was the third-highest wicket taker of all time at the time of his retirement in 2008.

Born in Bangalore, Mysore State (now Karnataka), Kumble developed an early interest in cricket as he grew up watching players like B. S. Chandrasekhar before becoming a full-fledged cricketer. He made his first-class debut at the age of 19 while representing Karnataka. Soon he was picked up for the Austral-Asia Cup in 1990 before making his Test debut against England later that year. Since then, he played 132 Test matches and was responsible for many of India's victories. In 1999, while playing against Pakistan, Kumble dismissed all ten batsmen in a Test match innings, joining England's Jim Laker as the second player to achieve the feat. He became a part of the regular ODI team during the early 1990s and had some of the best performances during this time. The year 1996 proved to very successful for him as he was selected for the World Cup and emerged as the most successful bowler of the tournament, taking 15 wickets in seven matches at an average of 18.73.

Unlike his contemporaries, Kumble was not a big turner of the ball, but relied primarily on pace, bounce, and accuracy. He was nicknamed "Jumbo", as his deliveries, for a spinner, were "as fast as a jumbo jet". He was selected as the Cricketer of the Year in 1993 Indian Cricket, and one of the Wisden Cricketers of the Year three years later. He was a member of the Indian team that was one of the joint-winners of the 2002 ICC Champions Trophy, where the title was shared with Sri Lanka.

Kumble was awarded the Padma Shri, India's fourth-highest civilian honour in 2005. After having played for 18 years, he announced his retirement from international cricket in November 2008. In October 2012, he was appointed the chairman of the International Cricket Council (ICC)'s cricket committee.

Between 2012 and 2015, Kumble held positions as a chief mentor for the teams Royal Challengers Bangalore and Mumbai Indians in the Indian Premier League. In February 2015, he became the fourth Indian cricketer to be inducted into ICC Hall of Fame. He also served as the head coach of the Indian cricket team between 2016 and 2017. From 2020 to 2022, he served as the head coach and the director of cricket operations of the IPL team Punjab Kings.

== Early and personal life ==
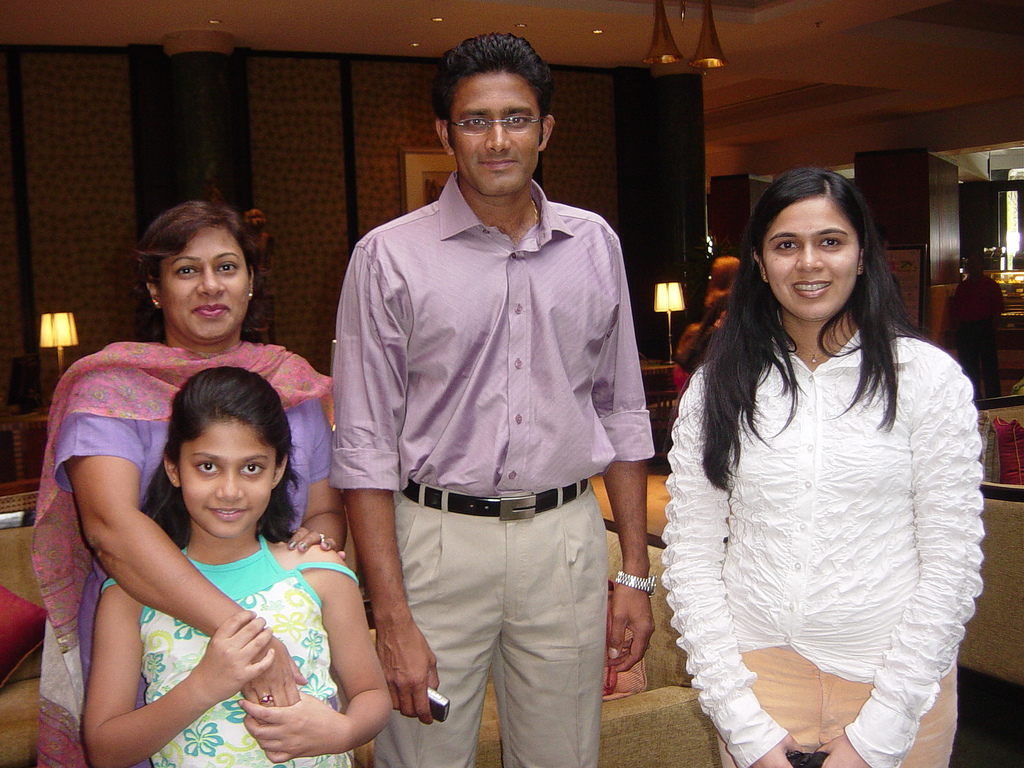

Kumble was born on 17 October 1970 in Bangalore, Mysore State (now Karnataka), to Krishna Swamy and Saroja who both hail from Kumbla near Kasaragod, Kerala. He has a brother named Dinesh. His mother tongue is Kannada.

Kumble did his primary schooling in Holy Saint English School and he completed his Class X from National High School Basavanagudi. He began playing cricket on the streets of Bangalore and joined a club called "Young Cricketers" at the age of 13. After his high school he completed his Class XII from National Pre-University College Basavanagudi. He later graduated from Rashtreeya Vidyalaya College of Engineering (RVCE) in B.E Mechanical Engineering in 1991–92.

Kumble married Chetana in 1999. They have three children – a son named Mayas, and two daughters, Aaruni and Svasti. He is a vegetarian.

== Career ==
=== Early domestic career and international career ===
Kumble made his first-class debut for Karnataka against Hyderabad on 30 November 1989, taking 4 wickets and bagging a king pair. He was then selected for India Under-19s against Pakistan Under-19s, scoring 113 in the first test and 76 in the second. He made his ODI debut against Sri Lanka at Sharjah in the Austral-Asia Cup on 25 April 1990. He played one more game in the series against Pakistan and ended up picking two wickets. His Test debut came in the same year when India toured England for a three-test series. It was the second test of the series played at Manchester and he picked up 3 wickets conceding 105 runs in the first innings and went wicket-less in the second innings of the match which resulted in a draw. He did not play any Tests until 1992. He picked up 13/138 in Irani Trophy against Delhi for Rest of India which ensured the latter's victory. This performance helped him earn a place in the Indian team that toured South Africa and Zimbabwe. It was during the 1992 Indian tour of South Africa that he established himself as a quality spinner, taking eight wickets in the second Test. He took 18 wickets at an average of 25.94 and with an economy rate of 1.84 in the four-test series. Later that year, when England toured India, Kumble took 21 wickets in three Tests at an average of 19.8. He picked up seven wickets for 165 runs in the third Test of the series played at Bombay as India went on to win the match by an innings and 15 runs. He was adjudged man of the match for his performance.

Kumble took his first 50 Test wickets in 10 matches; the record remained the fastest by an Indian bowler, until Ravichandran Ashwin surpassed him by achieving the feat in nine matches. His 100 Test wickets in 21 Test matches, the second fastest by an Indian bowler after Erapalli Prasanna (who took 100 wickets in 20 matches). On 27 November 1993, he took six wickets for 12 runs in an ODI against the West Indies at Eden Gardens, Calcutta in the final of the Hero Cup, which was the best ODI bowling record by an Indian for very long time, before it was broken by Stuart Binny on 17 June 2014 against Bangladesh. In January 1994, when Sri Lanka toured India, Kumble picked up his first 10 wicket haul in his 14th match which ensured India's victory by an innings and 119 runs. He picked up 11 wickets for 128 runs in the match.

In 1995 English cricket season Kumble played for Northamptonshire and was the leading wicket taker with 105 wickets at the average of 20.40. He was the only bowler to take more than 100 wickets during that season. His best performance came against Hampshire in a drawn match in County Championship, picking up 13 wickets for 192 runs. This performance in the English county cricket was noted by Wisden as they named him one of their five Cricketers of the Year in 1996.

=== 1996 World Cup ===
The year 1996 proved to be extremely successful for Kumble as he claimed 61 ODI wickets at an average of 20.24. All in all, he was the leading wicket-taker in the calendar year with 90 wickets at an average of 24.14 in Tests and ODIs combined. He was selected in the Indian team for the 1996 World Cup. He was a part of all the seven matches that India played, and was the leading wicket-taker in the tournament with 15 wickets at an average of 18.73. India played their first match against Kenya where he took three for 28 runs, which helped to restrict Kenya for just 199/6 in their 50 overs. India won the match comfortably by seven wickets. In the subsequent matches he picked up three for 35 runs (against West Indies) and two wickets for 39 runs (against Sri Lanka) in group phase.

India played against Pakistan in the quarter-final phase, where Kumble picked up 3 for 48 in the match which India eventually won. In the semi-final they subsequently lost to Sri Lanka in which his performance was 1 for 51.

=== Setting records and rise through the ranks ===
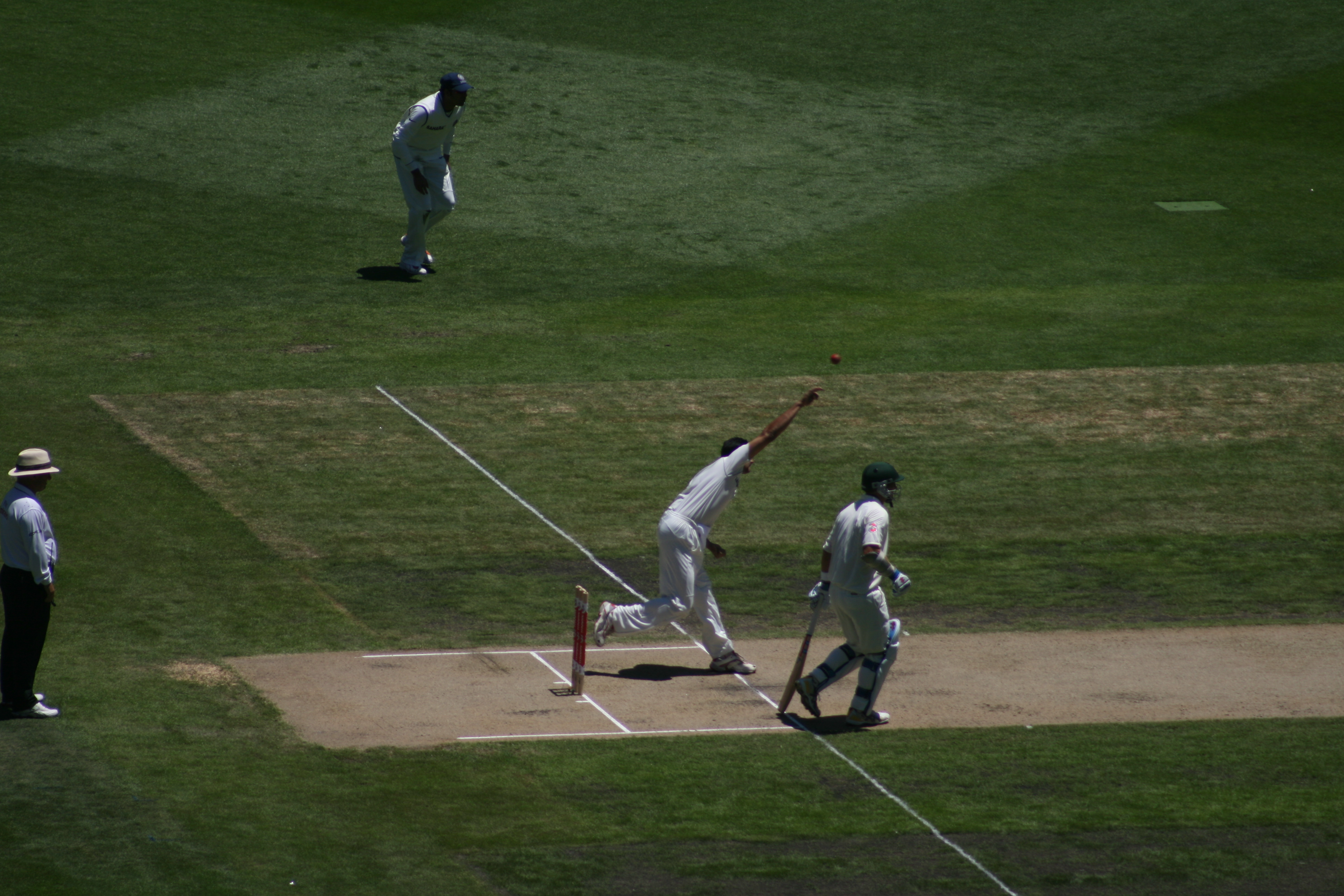
Anil Kumble bowling in the Boxing Day Test Match at Melbourne

In October 1996, Kumble along with Javagal Srinath helped India to win a scintillating ODI match against Australia in Bangalore in the Titan Cup. The duo added 52 runs for 9th wicket partnership, after Sachin Tendulkar got out at 88 when India was 164/8, chasing a target of 216 runs. India eventually went on to win the Titan Cup. In February 1997 India visited the West Indies for a series of five tests and four ODIs. Kumble was part of the squad and he was the leading wicket-taker in the Test series. He picked up 19 wickets, averaging 30.31 with the ball. Kumble was the leading wicket-taker by a large margin when Australia visited India for the Border-Gavaskar Trophy in 1998. He picked up 23 wickets in 3 test matches at the average of 18.26.

Kumble is one of three bowlers ever (the other two being Jim Laker of England in 1956 and later, Ajaz Patel of New Zealand in 2021) to have taken all ten wickets in a Test innings, taking 10 for 74 runs. He achieved this against Pakistan in the second Test played in Delhi in February 1999. It has been said that once he had got nine wickets, his friend and teammate Javagal Srinath started deliberately bowling wide outside the off stump, so that Kumble could take the tenth wicket. In an interview via 10 Sports, former opener Sadagoppan Ramesh revealed that in that match, when he tried to catch Waqar Younis off Srinath's bowling, Srinath cautioned him to drop the catch, saying that "he had no business going after that catch". The performance was rated by Wisden as the second best bowling performance of all time, and the achievement was commemorated by naming a traffic circle in Bengaluru after him and gifting him a car with the customised licence plate: KA-10-N-10. In 1999 he was the third highest wicket taker with 88 wickets at the average of 30.03 behind Glenn McGrath and Shane Warne.

On 6 October 2004, Kumble became only the third spinner in the history of Test cricket after Warne and Muttiah Muralitharan and the second Indian bowler after Kapil Dev to capture 400 Test wickets. Reaching the mark took him 30 fewer Test matches than Dev, and 7 fewer than Warne. In the India-West Indies series of 2006, Kumble took 6–78 in the second innings of the final Test in Sabina Park, Jamaica, and bowled India to a historic series win. During the first innings of the match, Kumble scored 45 and became the second player in the history of the game after Warne to score 2000 runs and take over 500 Test wickets. He also holds the world record for trapping most batsmen leg before wicket. On 10 December 2004, Kumble became India's highest wicket-taker when he trapped Mohammad Rafique of Bangladesh to surpass Kapil Dev's haul of 434 wickets.

Kumble also played for ACC Asian XI against ICC World XI in the World Cricket Tsunami Appeal ODI match on 10 January 2005 held at the Melbourne Cricket Ground which was organised for the charity purpose for 2004 Indian Ocean earthquake and tsunami victims. In the match, he picked up 2/73 and scored 11 runs off 7 balls. For his performances in 2005, he was named as 12th man in the World Test XI by ICC.

Kumble claimed his 500th Test wicket in the second Test of England's tour of India in March 2006, when he dismissed Steve Harmison leg before wicket. He became the first Indian and fifth overall to reach the mark. After returning to India from the 2007 World Cup, he announced his retirement from ODIs on 30 March.

On 10 August that year, Kumble scored his maiden Test century, making an unbeaten 110 against England at the Oval to help his team finish with 664. He took 117 Tests to reach his maiden Test hundred, which is a record for taking the most matches to score a century, beating Chaminda Vaas who had held this record previously with 96 Tests. It was also the only hundred by an Indian in the three-Test series. He is the only Test cricketer to have taken all ten wickets in an innings and score a Test hundred in his career. A day after scoring his ton, Kumble dismissed Michael Vaughan for his 900th International wicket and 563rd Test wicket, drawing him level with McGrath. Later he trapped Monty Panesar leg before wicket to finish the innings and overtake McGrath in the list of all-time wicket-takers.

Kumble has bowled 40850 balls in his entire Test career, which is the second highest after Muttiah Muralitharan's 44039 balls.

Kumble was appointed as the captain of the Indian Test team on 8 November 2007. He succeeded his state teammate Rahul Dravid, who resigned as the captain in September 2007. He is the only leg spinner who have become the captain of the team. His first series as captain was a three-match home series against Pakistan, which India won 1–0.

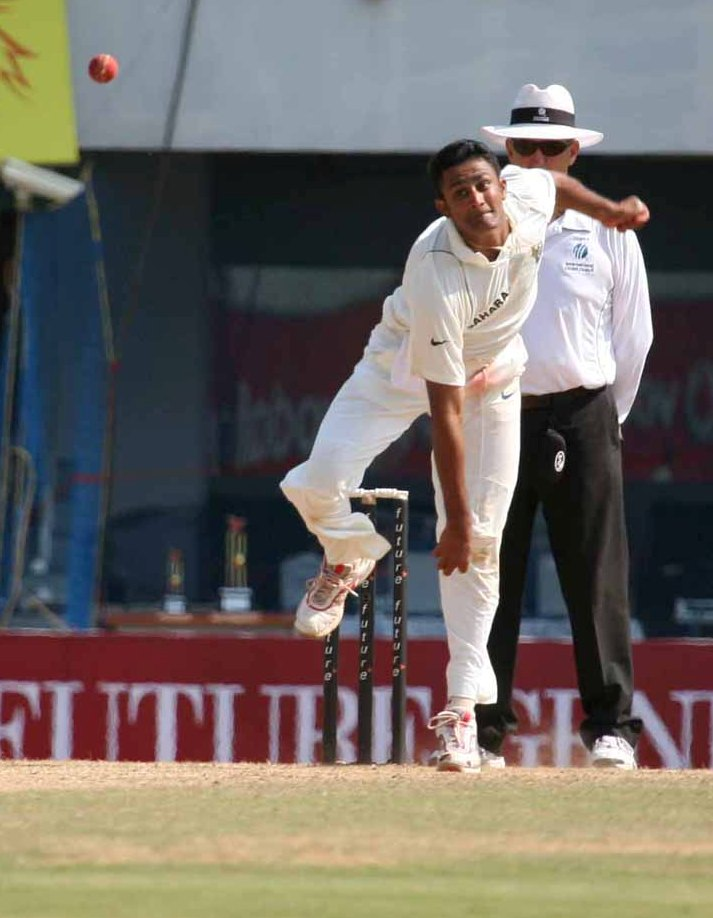
Kumble bowling in a match against South Africa in 2008.

On 17 January 2008, in the third Test against Australia at WACA, Perth, Kumble became the first Indian bowler and the third in the world to reach the milestone of 600 Test wickets. Kumble achieved the record just after the tea break when he had Andrew Symonds caught by Rahul Dravid at first slip. Kumble's 600 wickets came in 124 matches at an average of 28.68. Kumble has captured most wickets against Australia by an Indian bowler. Kumble is the third bowler after Muttiah Muralitharan and Shane Warne to take 600 Test wickets.

=== Retirement from international cricket ===
Kumble injured the little finger of his left hand while attempting a catch off Matthew Hayden in Australia's first innings which rendered him unfit for the 4th and final test of the series against Australia in November 2008. He was finding it difficult to find his striking form and went wicketless in four consecutive innings before the first innings of Australia in the third test of the series against Australia in which he managed three lower-order wickets. He declared the 2nd innings of India with only 6 overs of play left in the drawn match. His final figures were 4–0–14–0.

Kumble announced his retirement from Test, first-class, and List A cricket on 2 November 2008 in the third Test match against Australia at Feroz Shah Kotla cricket stadium at New Delhi, India. He dismissed Mitchell Johnson as his last Test wicket. The final ball of his test career was a low full toss on which Hayden scored a four. After his retirement, MS Dhoni was made the captain of the team.

=== IPL career ===
Kumble agreed to honour his contract with the Royal Challengers Bangalore (RCB) franchise of the Indian Premier League after retirement. He was given a three-year contract worth US$500,000 per year in the first round of bidding in 2008.

On 18 April 2009 he took a five-wicket haul conceding just 5 runs in 3.1 overs against the defending champions Rajasthan Royals, which helped RCB get a 75-run victory in the second match of the 2009 edition, played in South Africa. Even today, this remains the fourth-best bowling figures in IPL history. After the departure of Kevin Pietersen for England's cricket commitments, Kumble was named as the captain of the team. On 23 May 2009, RCB defeated the Chennai Super Kings by six wickets and earned a spot in the final against the Deccan Chargers. RCB lost the finals but Kumble won Man of the Match, and is the only person in IPL history to win Man of the Match in the final despite being on the losing team. Though RCB could not win the tournament, Kumble ended as the most successful spin bowler and the 2nd highest wicket-taker of the tournament with 21 wickets at an economy rate of 5.86 runs per over behind R. P. Singh.

In 2010 Indian Premier League, Kumble led the team to the semi-finals. After being forced to play their semi-finals at the DY Patil Stadium following security concerns in Bangalore, the Royal Challengers lost their semi-final to the Mumbai Indians with Kumble taking 1 wicket at an economy rate of 7.50 in the match. For his performances in 2010, he was named in the ESPNcricinfo IPL XI.

Kumble announced his retirement from Indian Premier League on 4 January 2011. After his retirement from IPL as a player, RCB appointed him as the chief mentor for the team, where he led them to the 2011 final against the Chennai Super Kings. Kumble left that position in January 2013, moving to a similar role with the Mumbai Indians, which he quit in November 2015 after delivering them 2 titles in alternative years. He then served as the director of operations for the Punjab Kings from 2020 to 2022.

== Style and technique ==
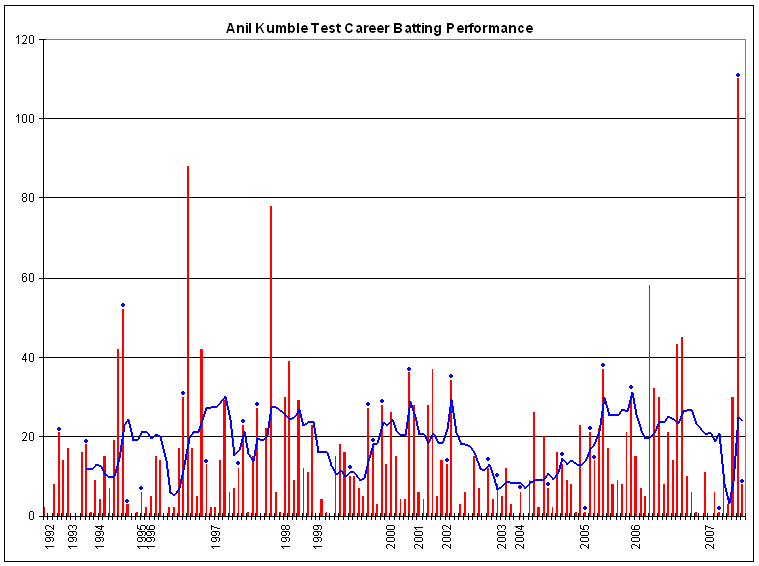
Test career batting performance of Anil Kumble.

Kumble was a right-arm leg spin bowler (legbreak googly) with an unorthodox style, most famous for his flipper. He started his career as a fast bowler, which gave him a useful faster delivery. His unique bowling style can be attributed to matting pitches in Bangalore which assist top-spin and over-spin.

Kumble was one of the 4 bowlers, alongside Richard Hadlee, Shane Warne and Muttiah Muralitharan (later Rangana Herath, James Anderson, Ravichandran Ashwin), and (then) the only Indian bowler ever, to have taken 5 wickets in a Test innings more than 30 times. He also holds the world record for the largest number of caught-and-bowled dismissals in Tests, 35 – which forms 5.65% of his total wickets. He is also one of 4 Indian bowlers to have conceded over 250 runs in a Test match, although he took 12 wickets in that match. He is known for bowling tirelessly, having bowled 72 overs in a Test innings once. He is also remembered for his tenacity in bowling even when injured, especially after an incident in a 2002 Test match against the West Indies in Antigua, where despite having his jaw fractured by a Mervyn Dillon delivery, he bandaged himself, came back to bowl, and took the wicket of Brian Lara.

Kumble relied more on accuracy, variations and bounce rather than spinning the ball. Sambit Bal, the editor of ESPNcricinfo, wrote, "That he [Kumble] has been an unusual spinner has been said many times before. It has also been said, a trifle unfairly, that he is a unidimensional bowler. Palpably, he has lacked the turn of Warne and Murali, but his variety has been subtler, far more apparent to batsmen than to viewers. He has shown that not only turn and flight that can deceive the batsman but also the changes of length and pace. He has been a cultured practitioner of his unique craft and a master of nuances."

As a captain and coach, he is a firm supporter of DRS.

== Involvement in cricket associations ==
Kumble has been appointed to the athlete's commission of the World Anti-Doping Agency (WADA), with his term starting on 1 January 2009.

On 21 November 2010, Kumble was elected as the President of the Karnataka State Cricket Association, with former teammates Venkatesh Prasad elected as vice-president and Javagal Srinath elected as Secretary.

On 12 October 2012, Kumble was appointed as the new chairman of the ICC Cricket Committee. He was later retained for another three years on 2 March 2019.

== Coaching career ==
On 24 June 2016, Kumble was appointed as the head coach of the Indian men's cricket team by the BCCI for a period of one year. His first series as a coach was against the West Indies in July where India played four Test matches, winning 2–0. Later India beat New Zealand 3–0 in the Test series, his second consecutive Test series win as a coach. India also defeated England 4–0 in the five-Test series in November–December and stretched their winning streak to three Test series victory. The next Test series win came against Bangladesh. India went on to dominate on their home soil which marked a 19-match unbeaten record in Tests.

During the four-match Test series against Australia in March, India lost the first match but made a sensational comeback, beating the Australians in two of the last three Tests, drawing one match and winning the series 2–1. India also registered two ODI series wins in Kumble's tenure, as India defeated New Zealand in a five ODI match series 3–2, followed by a 2–1 win over England in a three-match series.

On 20 June 2017, Kumble resigned from the post of head coach due to untenable differences with the then captain, Virat Kohli. His tenure ended after the 2017 ICC Champions Trophy, where India lost to Pakistan in the final.

In October 2019, he was appointed as the head coach and the director of cricket operations for Kings XI Punjab. In August 2022, Punjab Kings decided not to renew his contract.

== Awards and honours ==
- Arjuna award, a sports award from the Government of India, in 1995
- One of the Wisden Cricketers of the Year, in 1996.
- Among the 16 cricketers shortlisted for the Wisden Indian Cricketer of the 20th Century, in 2002 (Kapil Dev won)
- Padma Shri, a civilian award from the Government of India, in 2005.
- A prominent intersection in M. G. Road, Bengaluru has been named after Anil Kumble.
- 'Best breakthrough performance IPL 2009' for his 5/5 against Rajasthan Royals in IPL 2009.
- ICC Cricket Hall of Fame, a sports award from the ICC, in 2015.

== Records ==
Kumble is the most successful Indian bowler and the fourth-highest wicket-taker of all time. He took 35 five-wicket hauls and eight ten-wicket hauls in Tests and two five-wicket hauls in ODIs. He holds the record of bowling 40,850 balls in his Test career, which is the highest for an Indian and second-highest overall. He is also one of six bowlers to take 900 or more wickets in their entire career, taking 956 wickets in his career.

== Filmography ==
=== Films ===
Year	Film	Role	Language	Notes
2004	Meerabai Not Out	Himself	Hindi	Cameo

Preceded by Rahul Dravid	Indian National Test Cricket Captain; 2007	Succeeded by MS Dhoni
Preceded by Mohammad Azharuddin	Indian Awardees of Wisden Cricketer of the Year; 1991	Succeeded by Sachin Tendulkar
