= Subroto Porel =

Indian cricketer and umpire (born 1951)

Personal information
- Full name: Subroto K Porel
- Born: 10 May 1951 (age 75); Kolkata, West Bengal, India

Umpiring information
- ODIs umpired: 8 (1994–2002)
- Source: Cricinfo, 26 May 2014

Subroto K Porel (born 10 May 1951) is a former Indian cricketer and umpire. He stood in eight ODI games from 1994 to 2002.

== See also ==
- List of One Day International cricket umpires
