= Ajay Sharma =

Indian cricketer (born 1964)

Personal information
- Full name: Ajay Sharma
- Born: 3 April 1964 (age 62); Delhi, India
- Bowling: Slow left-arm orthodox
- Role: Batsman
- Relatives: Manan Sharma (son)

International information
- National side: India
- Only Test (cap 182): 11 January 1988 v West Indies
- ODI debut (cap 64): 2 January 1988 v West Indies
- Last ODI: 16 November 1998 v West Indies

Domestic team information
- Years: Team
- 1984–2000: Delhi
- 2000–2001: Himachal Pradesh

Career statistics
Competition	Test	ODI	FC	LA
Matches	1	31	129	113
Runs scored	53	424	10,120	2,814
Batting average	26.5	20.19	67.46	36.07
100s/50s	0/0	0/3	38/36	2/20
Top score	30	59	259*	135*
Balls bowled	24	1,140	6,438	3,985
Wickets	0	15	87	108
Bowling average	–	58.33	31.01	28.37
5 wickets in innings	–	0	1	2
10 wickets in match	–	0	0	0
Best bowling	–	3/41	5/34	5/30
Catches/stumpings	0/–	26/–	94/–	43/–
Medal record
Men's Cricket
Representing India
ACC Asia Cup
Winner	1988 Bangladesh
- Source: CricketArchive, 14 December 2009

Ajay Kumar Sharma (born 3 April 1964) is an Indian former cricketer. He was a prolific run-maker in first-class cricket, mainly for Delhi, scoring over 10,000 runs, at an average of 67.46. He was a part of the Indian squad which won the 1988 Asia Cup.

== Domestic career ==
In the Ranji Trophy, Sharma scored a record 31 centuries and his batting average of approximately 80 in the competition is second only to Vijay Merchant. In the 1996–97 season, he became only the third player to score over 1,000 runs in a Ranji Trophy season. He played in six Ranji Trophy finals for Delhi, scoring centuries in four of them, but only twice ended up on the winning side (1985–86 and 1991–92). Sharma also regularly represented North Zone in the Duleep Trophy.

== International career ==
Despite his strong domestic record, Sharma only played one Test match for India - against the West Indies in January 1988. He played 31 One Day Internationals for India from 1988 to 1993.

In December 1988, he scored back-to-back fifties against New Zealand, but he did not reach those heights again except for a 59 not out (his highest ODI score) against Zimbabwe in March 1993. He finished with 424 runs at a batting average of 20.19. Sharma also took 15 wickets using his left-arm spin with a best of 3/41 against Australia in October 1989.

== Life ban ==
In 2000, aged 36, his career ended when he received a life ban from cricket after he was implicated in a match-fixing scandal.

In September 2014, Sharma was cleared from all charges related to match-fixing by Delhi district court and has asked the BCCI to allow him to take part in the board's activities and those of its associates.

He retired from active cricket and is now invested in running multiple franchises of laundry and dry-cleaning brand UClean in Delhi NCR and Punjab.

== See also ==
- List of cricketers banned for match fixing
