= Robin Singh (cricketer) =

Indian cricketer

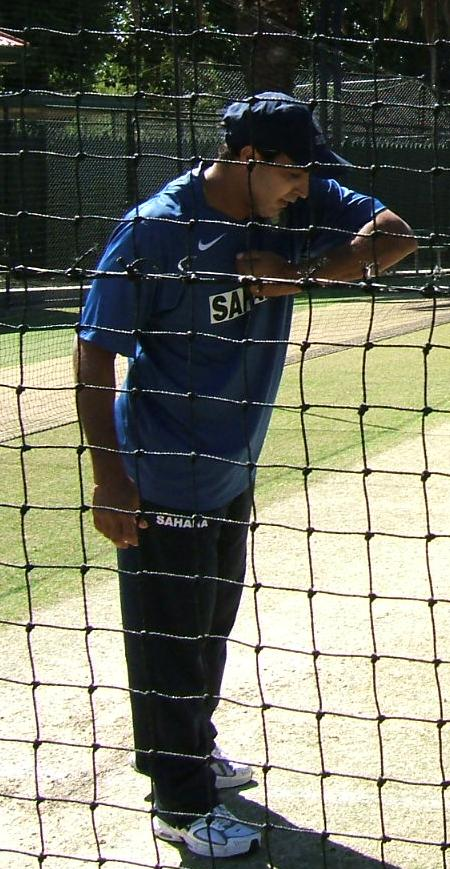

Personal information
- Full name: Rabindra Ramanarayan Singh
- Born: 14 September 1963 (age 63); Princes Town, Trinidad and Tobago
- Batting: Left-handed
- Bowling: Right-arm medium
- Role: All-rounder

International information
- National side: India (1989–2001)
- Only Test (cap 217): 7 October 1998 v Zimbabwe
- ODI debut (cap 71): 11 March 1989 v West Indies
- Last ODI: 3 April 2001 v Australia
- ODI shirt no.: 6

Career statistics
Competition	Test	ODI	FC	LA
Matches	1	136	137	228
Runs scored	27	2,336	6,997	4,057
Batting average	13.50	25.95	46.03	26.51
100s/50s	0/0	1/9	22/33	1/20
Top score	15	100	183*	100
Balls bowled	60	3,734	12,201	7,544
Wickets	0	69	172	150
Bowling average	–	43.26	35.97	39.00
5 wickets in innings	–	2	4	2
10 wickets in match	–	0	1	0
Best bowling	–	5/22	7/54	5/22
Catches/stumpings	5/–	33/–	109/–	56/–
Medal record
Men's Cricket
Representing India
ICC Champions Trophy
Runner-up	2000 Kenya
ACC Asia Cup
Runner-up	1997 Sri Lanka
- Source: ESPNcricinfo, 9 November 2014

Rabindra Ramanarayan "Robin" Singh (born 14 September 1963) is an Indian former cricketer and cricket coach. He represented India in one Test and 136 ODIs between 1989 and 2001. An all-rounder, he was a left-handed middle-order batsman and a right-arm medium pace bowler. He has coached the Indian Premier League's Mumbai Indians since 2010 and the Caribbean Premier League's Barbados Tridents since 2013. He has also coached the Deccan Chargers in the IPL's inaugural year.

As a player, Singh was known for his calmness and ability to perform under pressure. He brought to Indian cricket world class fielding. He was a part of the squad which finished as runners-up at the 2000 ICC Champions Trophy.

Born in Trinidad to Indo-Trinidadian parents, Singh moved to India in 1984 and studied at Madras University during which he played club and college-level cricket. He helped Tamil Nadu win the Ranji Trophy in 1988, and was one of the season's most consistent players. He captained both Tamil Nadu and South Zone. He gave up his Trinidad and Tobago passport so he could become an Indian citizen and play for India's national cricket team.

== Early life ==
Rabindra Ramanarayan Singh was born in Princes Town, Trinidad and Tobago, to Ramanarayan and Savitri Singh on 14 September 1963, and is of Indian descent. His forefathers were originally from Ajmer in Rajasthan. At the age of 19, Singh moved to Madras (Chennai), India, where he earned a master's degree in economics at the University of Madras while beginning his cricket career. He currently resides in Chennai with his wife Sujata and son Dhananjay, while his parents and siblings still live in Trinidad and Tobago.

== Domestic career ==
While in Trinidad, Singh captained the Trinidad youth cricket team in regional tournaments from 1982 to 1983. He represented the senior Trinidad cricket team in two one-day matches in 1983, during which he played alongside Phil Simmons, David Williams, Larry Gomes, Gus Logie, Rangy Nanan, Sheldon Gomes, and Richard Gabriel.

Singh started his first-class career for Tamil Nadu during the 1985–86 season. Tamil Nadu won the Ranji Trophy for the first time in 33 years.Tamil Nadu has not won the Ranji Trophy after that. During his nearly two decade long career, he was an all-rounder for his team making more than 6,000 runs and taking 172 wickets with his medium-fast bowling.

== International career ==
Singh made his debut for the Indian national cricket team in a One Day International against the West Indies cricket team on 11 March 1989. He played two one-day Internationals, coming in to bat at number 7 both times in futile situations. The Indian team dropped Singh after the series, and he played in domestic and overseas leagues for the next seven years, after which he secured a regular place on the Indian cricket team. Singh was recalled for the Titan Cup tournament in 1996. He remained a regular player in the One Day Internationals until 2001. Singh was known for his middle-to-lower order batting, medium-pace bowling, and his ground fielding skills. He was considered as the best Indian fielder in those times. He was also known for his batting in closing overs (usually along with Ajay Jadeja), which made him an integral player during the 1999 Cricket World Cup. Throughout his career, Singh was considered a better fit for One Day matches.

== Coaching career ==
Singh began coaching soon after his retirement. His first coaching position was with the Indian under-19 cricket team. In 2004, he began coaching the Hong Kong national cricket team, helping it qualify for the 2004 Asia Cup. In 2006, Singh was appointed coach of the India A cricket team, where he coached cricketers such as Gautam Gambhir and Robin Uthappa. Several cricketers whom Singh coached went on to play for the Indian national team. Singh was named the Indian national team fielding coach in 2007 and 2008 and was appointed the first head coach of the Deccan Chargers franchise in the Indian Premier League.

Singh remained the fielding coach for the Indian national cricket team until October 2009 and was the batting coach of the Mumbai Indians, an Indian Premier League team. He joined MI in 2010 as Head coach for 3 years, which was a turning point in the team's fortunes as before that they had failed to qualify in the top four. He helped the Mumbai Indians occupy the runner-up position during the 2010 IPL season and was a part of the coaching structure since then winning the 2013 IPL season, the 2015 IPL season 2017 and 2019 and 2020 Indian Premier League championships. He also helped win the 2013 Champions League Twenty20, and the 2011 Champions League Twenty20.

Singh coached the Khulna Division cricket team in the Bangladesh Premier League, where he helped Dwayne Smith and Andre Russell further their cricket skills. In 2012, the Uva cricket team, under Singh's coaching, won the Sri Lanka Premier League tournament.

He was also the coach of the Barbados Tridents. Since its inception, the Tridents have won once, and have played two finals and a semifinal. Robin Singh was also the Head Coach and Mentor of City Kaitak, which finished as the runners-up of the 2017 edition of Hong Kong T20 Blitz. He was also the Head Coach of Karaikudi Kaalai, in the Tamil Nadu Premier League, between 2016 and 2017. He also coached the Kerala Kings, who were crowned as the Champions of the inaugural edition of the T10 League. He moved teams in 2018 to a new franchise, Northern Warriors for the second edition of the T10 League and took that team to victory in the tournament, making it back to back titles albeit with 2 different teams. In the 2020 edition Northern Warriors won yet again and Singh was replaced due to franchise ownership changing hands .

Singh was also involved in coaching the senior and junior USA cricket teams. In 2011, Singh coached the United States women's cricket team at the World Cup Qualifier Tournament in Bangladesh.

Robin Singh was appointed Director of Cricket – UAE Cricket and Head Coach of the UAE National Cricket Team in 2020.After 2 years of the pandemic disrupted his tenure at the start with virtually no cricket being played by his wards in a few months of active cricket uae had a series of successes to qualify for the ICC T20 World Cup in Australia. Although they didn't make it to the super 12s they had 3 hard fought games with few players putting up notable performances. He has currently been appointed the GM of MI Emirates for the inaugural edition of the UAE ILT20 league in 2023.Consequently, in 2024 he was appointed Head Coach of the same team which went on to become the Champions of the ILT20 2024.

Major Coaching Trophy Cabinet

Team / National Side	Role	Tournament / League	Titles
India Senior Team	Fielding Coach	ICC World T20 (2007)	1
India Under-19	Head Coach	ACC Under-19 Asia Cup	1
India A	Head Coach	Major Titles	0
Mumbai Indians	Batting Coach / Senior Staff	IPL	5
Mumbai Indians	Head Coach	Champions League T20 (2011)	1
Mumbai Indians	Senior Coaching Staff	Champions League T20 (2013)	1
MI Emirates	Head Coach	ILT20	1
UAE National Team	Head Coach	ACC Men's T20 Premier Cup	1
Hong Kong National Team	Head Coach	ACC Men's T20 Premier Cup	1
Barbados Tridents	Head Coach	Caribbean Premier League	1
Uva Next	Head Coach	Sri Lanka Premier League	1
Northern Warriors	Head Coach	Abu Dhabi T10 League	2
Kerala Kings	Head Coach	Abu Dhabi T10 League	1
		TOTAL MAJOR COACHING TITLES	17

== Initiatives ==
In 2017 Robin Singh launched the Robin Singh Sports Academy in Dubai to provide state-of-the-art facilities for young Emirati cricketers. The mission of his academy is to be a one-stop destination for all sports in the UAE expanding to cover the GCC and to help identify and nurture sportsmen and women to become champions and ambassadors for their country, and contribute towards a healthier community.
