= Divakar Vasu =

Personal information
- Born: 11 December 1967 (age 58); Coonoor, Tamil Nadu, India
- Batting: Right-handed
- Bowling: Left-arm medium-fast, Slow left-arm orthodox
- Role: All-rounder

Domestic team information
- Years: Team
- 1988/89–1998/99: Tamil Nadu
- 2003/04: Assam

Career statistics
Competition	FC	List A
Matches	76	41
Runs scored	3,001	527
Batting average	35.72	21.95
100s/50s	3/19	0/2
Top score	148	66
Balls bowled	15,234	2,054
Wickets	240	50
Bowling average	25.11	26.94
5 wickets in innings	14	0
10 wickets in match	2	n/a
Best bowling	8/114	4/36
Catches/stumpings	57/–	12/–
- Source: ESPNcricinfo, 10 January 2016

Divakar Vasu (born 11 December 1967) is a former Indian first-class cricketer who played for Tamil Nadu between the 1988/89 and 1998/99 seasons. After retirement, he became a cricket coach.

== Life and career ==
Vasu started his career as a batsman, before developing into an all-rounder who bowled left-arm medium pace. He changed his bowling style to slow left-arm orthodox after he met with a bike accident in 1993 which fractured three bones in his left ankle. In 1995, he lost vision in his left eye.

Representing Tamil Nadu for eleven seasons from 1988/89 to 1998/99 and Assam for one match in 2003/04, Vasu appeared in 76 first-class and 41 List A matches during his career. He also played for South Zone cricket team and Board President's XI. He was the second-highest wicket-taker in 1994–95 Ranji Trophy with 34 wickets at an average of 17.94. Despite a successful career as an all-rounder, Vasu was never selected for the national team. He continued to play in Tamil Nadu Cricket Association first division at the conclusion of his first-class career.

Vasu worked as a coach at the National Cricket Academy before becoming a bowling coach for International Cricket Council, the Board of Control for Cricket in India as well as the Indian Premier League. Vasu, along with M. Venkataramana, helped Pragyan Ojha correct his bowling action in 2015.

Ahead of the 2019–20 season, he was appointed head coach of Tamil Nadu.
