= India at the Men's T20 World Cup =

India at the T20 World Cup

- Flag of India
- Cricket format: T20 International
- Host(s): 2016, 2026
- Champions: 3 (2007, 2024, 2026)
- Runners-up: 1 (2014)
- Most runs: Virat Kohli (1,292)
- Most wickets: Jasprit Bumrah (40)

The India national cricket team is one of the full members of the International Cricket Council (ICC), the governing body of cricket. The Men's T20 World Cup has been hosted by the ICC in the Twenty20 International format since 2007. It has been held as a biennial event since the 2022 Men's T20 World Cup. There have been ten editions of the tournament and India has participated in every edition since its introduction. India has won it thrice in 2007, 2024 and 2026 while also finishing as runners-up in 2014. It is the only team to have won it thrice. In the 2024 edition, India became the first and only team to go undefeated in the entire tournament.

In the inaugural edition of the tournament in 2007, the Indian team led by M S Dhoni registered four wins in six matches enroute to the final, in which it beat Pakistan to win the title. In the 2009, 2010, and 2012 editions, India was eliminated in the Super 8 stage in three consecutive tournaments. In the 2014 World Cup, the Indian team won five consecutive matches to reach the final, where it lost to Sri Lanka by six wickets. In the 2016 tournament, hosted by India, the Indian team was led by Dhoni for the sixth consecutive T20 World Cup, and advanced to the semifinals, where it lost to the West Indies.

In the 2021 World Cup, conducted after a gap of five years, the Indian team, led by Virat Kohli, won three out of the five matches in the initial stage, and did not make it to the semifinals. In the 2022 edition, the team, captained by Rohit Sharma, reached the semifinals, where it lost to England. In the subsequent tournament held in 2024, the Sharma-led team, did not lose a single game in the seven matches played in the first two rounds. India beat England in the semifinals by 68 runs, before beating South Africa in the final by seven runs to win the T20 World Cup for the second time. In the 2026 edition co-hosted by India, the team led by Suryakumar Yadav, beat New Zealand in the final to win its second consecutive T20 World Cup.

Kohli is the leading run scorer for India with 1,292 runs and holds the record for the most runs across T20 World Cups. Sanju Samson holds the record for the most runs scored for India in a single edition of the World Cup with 321 runs in the 2026 T20 World Cup. Jasprit Bumrah holds the record for the most number of wickets for India with 40 wickets. Arshdeep Singh holds the record for the most wickets in a single tournament, with 17 wickets in the 2024 edition. Rishabh Pant holds the record for the most dismissals by a wicket keeper in a single T20 World Cup with 14 dismissals in the 2024 tournament.

== Overall Record ==
Red box indicates that the tournament was hosted or co-hosted by India

Host and Year	Round	Position	Matches	Won	Lost	Tied+Won (Note: Won by Bowl-out or Super Over)	No Result
(South Africa) 2007	Champions	1/12	7	4	1	1	1
(England) 2009	Super 8s	7/12	5	2	3	0	0
(Cricket West Indies) 2010	Super 8s	8/12	5	2	3	0	0
(Sri Lanka) 2012	Super 8s	5/12	5	4	1	0	0
(Bangladesh) 2014	Runners-up	2/16	6	5	1	0	0
(India) 2016	Semi-finals	4/16	5	3	2	0	0
(United Arab Emirates) (Oman) 2021	Super 12s	6/16	5	3	2	0	0
(Australia) 2022	Semi-finals	3/16	6	4	2	0	0
(Cricket West Indies) (United States) 2024	Champions	1/20	9	8	0	0	1
(India) (Sri Lanka) 2026	Champions	1/20	9	8	1	0	0
(Australia) (New Zealand) 2028	Qualified						
(England) (Wales) (Republic of Ireland) (Scotland) 2030	TBD						
Total	10/10	3 Titles	62	43	16	1	2
Last updated: 8 March 2026

=== By opponent ===
Won more matches than lost
Won equal matches to lost
Lost more matches than won

Opponent	Matches	Won	Lost	Tied+Won	No Result	Win %
Afghanistan	4	4	0	0	0	100.00
Australia	6	4	2	0	0	66.67
Bangladesh	5	5	0	0	0	100.00
England	6	4	2	0	0	66.67
Ireland	2	2	0	0	0	100.00
Namibia	2	2	0	0	0	100.00
Netherlands	2	2	0	0	0	100.00
New Zealand	4	1	3	0	0	25.00
Pakistan	9	7	1	1	0	88.89
South Africa	8	5	3	0	0	62.50
Scotland	2	1	0	0	1	100.00
Sri Lanka	2	0	2	0	0	00.00
United States	2	2	0	0	0	100.00
West Indies	5	2	3	0	0	40.00
Zimbabwe	2	2	0	0	0	100.00
Total	61	43	16	1	1	72.95
Source: Last updated: 8 March 2026.

== Tournament records ==
=== 2007 World Cup ===
Squad

- M.S Dhoni (c) (wk)
- Yuvraj Singh (vc)
- Gautham Gambhir
- Virender Sehwag
- Rohit Sharma

- Ajit Agarkar
- Joginder Sharma
- Piyush Chawla
- S. Sreesanth
- Yusuf Pathan

- Irfan Pathan
- Robin Uthappa
- Dinesh Karthik
- Harbhajan Singh
- R.P. Singh

Result

Event	Group stage			Super 8s				Semifinal	Final	Overall Result
Event	Opposition Result	Opposition Result	Rank	Opposition Result	Opposition Result	Opposition Result	Rank	Opposition Result	Opposition Result	Overall Result
2007	Scotland; No Result	Pakistan; Tied + Won by bowl-out	1	New Zealand; Lost by 10 runs	England; Won by 18 runs	South Africa; Won by 37 runs	1	Australia; Won by 15 runs	Pakistan; Won by 5 runs	Winner

=== 2009 World Cup ===
Squad

- M.S Dhoni (c) (wk)
- Yuvraj Singh
- Gautham Gambhir
- Ravindra Jadeja
- Rohit Sharma

- Suresh Raina
- Zaheer Khan
- Praveen Kumar
- Pragyan Ojha
- Yusuf Pathan

- Irfan Pathan
- Ishant Sharma
- Dinesh Karthik
- Harbhajan Singh
- R.P. Singh

Result

Event	Group stage			Super 8s				Semifinal	Final	Overall Result
Event	Opposition Result	Opposition Result	Rank	Opposition Result	Opposition Result	Opposition Result	Rank	Opposition Result	Opposition Result	Overall Result
2009	Bangladesh; Won by 25 runs	Ireland; Won by 8 wickets	1	West Indies; Lost by 7 wickets	England; Lost by 3 runs	South Africa; Lost by 12 runs	4	Did not advance		Super 8s

=== 2010 World Cup ===
Squad

- M.S Dhoni (c) (wk)
- Yuvraj Singh
- Gautham Gambhir
- Ravindra Jadeja
- Rohit Sharma

- Suresh Raina
- Zaheer Khan
- Praveen Kumar
- Piyush Chawla
- Yusuf Pathan

- Murali Vijay
- Vinay Kumar
- Dinesh Karthik
- Harbhajan Singh
- Ashish Nehra

Result

Event	Group stage			Super 8s				Semifinal	Final	Overall Result
Event	Opposition Result	Opposition Result	Rank	Opposition Result	Opposition Result	Opposition Result	Rank	Opposition Result	Opposition Result	Overall Result
2010	Afghanistan; Won by 7 wickets	South Africa; Won by 14 runs	1	Australia; Lost by 49 runs	West Indies; Lost by 14 runs	Sri Lanka; Lost by 5 wickets	4	Did not advance		Super 8s

=== 2012 World Cup ===
Squad

- M.S Dhoni (c) (wk)
- Yuvraj Singh
- Gautham Gambhir
- Ravichandran Ashwin
- Rohit Sharma

- Suresh Raina
- Zaheer Khan
- Virat Kohli
- Manoj Tiwary
- Virender Sehwag

- Irfan Pathan
- Piyush Chawla
- Ashok Dinda
- Harbhajan Singh
- Lakshmipathy Balaji

Result

Event	Group stage			Super 8s				Semifinal	Final	Overall Result
Event	Opposition Result	Opposition Result	Rank	Opposition Result	Opposition Result	Opposition Result	Rank	Opposition Result	Opposition Result	Overall Result
2012	Afghanistan; Won by 23 runs	England; Won by 90 runs	1	Australia; Lost by 9 wickets	Pakistan; Won by 8 wickets	South Africa; Won by 1 run	3	Did not advance		Super 8s

=== 2014 World Cup ===
Squad

- M.S Dhoni (c) (wk)
- Yuvraj Singh
- Shikhar Dhawan
- Ravichandran Ashwin
- Rohit Sharma

- Suresh Raina
- Ajinkya Rahane
- Virat Kohli
- Mohammed Shami
- Bhuvneshwar Kumar

- Ravindra Jadeja
- Varun Aaron
- Amit Mishra
- Mohit Sharma
- Stuart Binny

Result

Event	Super 10					Semifinal	Final	Overall Result
Event	Opposition Result	Opposition Result	Opposition Result	Opposition Result	Rank	Opposition Result	Opposition Result	Overall Result
2014	Pakistan; Won by 7 wickets	West Indies; Won by 7 wickets	Bangladesh; Won by 8 wickets	Australia; Won by 73 runs	1	South Africa; Won by 6 wickets	Sri Lanka; Lost by 6 wickets	Runner-up

=== 2016 World Cup ===
Squad

- M.S Dhoni (c) (wk)
- Virat Kohli
- Rohit Sharma
- Harbhajan Singh
- Shikhar Dhawan

- Ravichandran Ashwin
- Jasprit Bumrah
- Suresh Raina
- Ajinkya Rahane
- Mohammed Shami

- Ravindra Jadeja
- Hardik Pandya
- Manish Pandey
- Ashish Nehra
- Pawan Negi

Result

Event	Super 10					Semifinal	Final	Overall Result
Event	Opposition Result	Opposition Result	Opposition Result	Opposition Result	Rank	Opposition Result	Opposition Result	Overall Result
2016	New Zealand; Lost by 47 runs	Pakistan; Won by 6 wickets	Bangladesh; Won by 1 run	Australia; Won by 6 wickets	2	West Indies; Lost by 7 wickets	Did not advance	Semi-finals

=== 2021 World Cup ===
Squad and kit

- Virat Kohli (c)
- Rohit Sharma
- KL Rahul
- Suryakumar Yadav
- Ravichandran Ashwin
- Ishan Kishan (wk)
- Bhuvneshwar Kumar
- Jasprit Bumrah
- Mohammad Shami
- Ravindra Jadeja
- Hardik Pandya
- Rishabh Pant (wk)
- Varun Chakravarthy
- Rahul Chahar
- Shardul Thakur

2021 kit

Result

Event	Super 12						Semifinal	Final	Overall Result
Event	Opposition Result	Opposition Result	Opposition Result	Opposition Result	Opposition Result	Rank	Opposition Result	Opposition Result	Overall Result
2021	Pakistan; Lost by 10 wickets	New Zealand; Lost by 8 wickets	Afghanistan; Won by 66 runs	Scotland; Won by 8 wickets	Namibia; Won by 9 wickets	3	Did not advance		Super 12

=== 2022 World Cup ===
Squad and kit

- Rohit Sharma (c)
- Virat Kohli
- KL Rahul
- Suryakumar Yadav
- Ravichandran Ashwin
- Axar Patel
- Bhuvneshwar Kumar
- Arshdeep Singh
- Mohammad Shami
- Harshal Patel
- Hardik Pandya
- Rishabh Pant (wk)
- Yuzvendra Chahal
- Dinesh Karthik
- Deepak Hooda

2022 kit

Result

Event	Super 12						Semifinal	Final	Overall Result
Event	Opposition Result	Opposition Result	Opposition Result	Opposition Result	Opposition Result	Rank	Opposition Result	Opposition Result	Overall Result
2022	Pakistan; Won by 4 wickets	Netherlands; Won by 56 runs	South Africa; Lost by 5 wickets	Bangladesh; Won by 5 runs	Zimbabwe; Won by 71 runs	1	England; Lost by 10 wickets	Did not advance	Semi-finals

=== 2024 World Cup ===
Squad and kit

- Rohit Sharma (c)
- Virat Kohli
- Yashasvi Jaiswal
- Suryakumar Yadav
- Shivam Dube
- Axar Patel
- Mohammed Siraj
- Arshdeep Singh
- Kuldeep Yadav
- Jasprit Bumrah
- Hardik Pandya
- Rishabh Pant (wk)
- Sanju Samson (wk)
- Ravindra Jadeja
- Yuzvendra Chahal

2024 kit

Result

Event	Group Stage					Super 8				Semifinal	Final	Overall Result
Event	Opposition Result	Opposition Result	Opposition Result	Opposition Result	Rank	Opposition Result	Opposition Result	Opposition Result	Rank	Opposition Result	Opposition Result	Overall Result
2024	Ireland; Won by 8 wickets	Pakistan; Won by 6 runs	United States; Won by 7 wickets	Canada; Abandoned	1Q	Afghanistan; Won by 47 runs	Bangladesh; Won by 50 runs	Australia; Won by 24 runs	1Q	England; Won by 68 runs	South Africa; Won by 7 runs	Winner

=== 2026 World Cup ===
Squad and kit

- Suryakumar Yadav (c)
- Axar Patel (vc)
- Sanju Samson (wk)
- Ishan Kishan (wk)
- Hardik Pandya
- Rinku Singh
- Washington Sundar
- Abhishek Sharma
- Tilak Varma
- Shivam Dube
- Arshdeep Singh
- Jasprit Bumrah
- Mohammad Siraj
- Varun Chakaravarthy
- Kuldeep Yadav

2026 kit

Results

Event	Group Stage					Super 8				Semifinal	Final	Overall Result
Event	Opposition Result	Opposition Result	Opposition Result	Opposition Result	Rank	Opposition Result	Opposition Result	Opposition Result	Rank	Opposition Result	Opposition Result	Overall Result
2026	United States; Won by 29 runs	Namibia; Won by 93 runs	Pakistan; Won by 61 runs	Netherlands; Won by 17 runs	1Q	South Africa; Lost by 76 runs	Zimbabwe; Won by 72 runs	West Indies; Won by 5 wickets	2Q	England; Won by 7 runs	New Zealand; Won by 96 runs	Winner

== Statistics ==
=== Most Runs ===
Most Runs
Rank	Runs	Player	Matches	Innings	Period
1	1,292	Virat Kohli	35	33	2012-2024
2	1,220	Rohit Sharma	47	44	2007-2024
3	722	Suryakumar Yadav	27	26	2021-2026
4	593	Yuvraj Singh	31	28	2007-2016
5	574	Hardik Pandya	33	25	2016-2026
Last updated: 8 March 2026

=== Most Wickets ===
Most Wickets
Rank	Wickets	Player	Matches	Innings	Period
1	40	Jasprit Bumrah	26	26	2016-2026
2	36	Arshdeep Singh	22	22	2022-2026
3	33	Hardik Pandya	33	30	2016-2026
4	32	Ravichandran Ashwin	24	24	2012-2022
5	23	Akshar Patel	20	20	2022-2026
Last updated: 8 March 2026

=== Highest totals ===
Highest totals
Rank	Score	Overs	Opposition	Venue	Date	Result
1	256/4	20	Zimbabwe	M. A. Chidambaram Stadium, Chennai, India	26 February 2026	Won
2	255/5	20	New Zealand	Narendra Modi Stadium, Ahmedabad, India	8 March 2026	Won
3	253/7	20	England	Wankhede Stadium, Mumbai, India	5 March 2026	Won
3	218/4	20	England	Kingsmead Cricket Ground, Durban, South Africa	19 September 2007	Won
4	210/2	20	Afghanistan	Sheikh Zayed Cricket Stadium, Abu Dhabi, UAE	3 November 2021	Won
Last updated: 8 March 2026

=== Highest run chases ===
Highest successful run chases
Rank	Target	Score	Overs	Opposition	Venue	Date
1	196	199/5	19.2	West Indies	Eden Gardens, Kolkata, India	1 March 2026
2	173	176/4	19.1	South Africa	Sher-e-Bangla National Cricket Stadium, Dhaka, Bangladesh	4 April 2014
3	161	161/4	19.1	Australia	I. S. Bindra Stadium, Mohali, India	27 March 2016
4	160	160/6	20	Pakistan	Melbourne Cricket Ground, Melbourne, Australia	23 October 2022
5	139	141/2	18.3	Bangladesh	Sher-e-Bangla National Cricket Stadium, Mirpur, Bangladesh	28 March 2014
Last updated: 2 March 2026

=== Lowest scores defended ===
Lowest score defended (Note: Does not include shortened matches)
Rank	Score	Opposition Score	Opposition	Venue	Date
1	119	113/7	Pakistan	Nassau County International Cricket Stadium, New York, USA	9 June 2024
2	146/7	145/9	Bangladesh	M. Chinnaswamy Stadium, Bengaluru, India	23 March 2016
3	152/6	151	South Africa	R. Premadasa Stadium, Colombo, Sri Lanka	2 October 2012
4	153/5	116/9	South Africa	Kingsmead Cricket Ground, Durban, South Africa	20 September 2007
5	157/5	152	Pakistan	Wanderers Stadium, Johannesburg, South Africa	24 September 2007
Last updated: 6 March 2026

== See also ==
- India at the Asian Games
- India at the Champions Trophy
- India at the Commonwealth Games
- India at the Summer Olympics
- India at the Winter Olympics
- India women's national cricket team
