= India at the Champions Trophy =

- Flag of India
- Cricket format: One Day International
- Host(s): 2006
- Champions: 3 (2002, 2013, 2025)
- Runners-up: 2 (2000, 2017)
- Most runs: Virat Kohli (747)
- Most wickets: Ravindra Jadeja (21)

India is one of the full members of the International Cricket Council (ICC), the governing body of cricket. There have been eight editions of the tournament and India has participated in every edition. India have won it three times in 2002, 2013, and 2025 while also finishing as runners-up in 2000 and 2017.

== Overall record ==
Red box indicates that the tournament was hosted or co-hosted by India

Champions Trophy record
Host and Year	Round	Position	GP	W	L	T	NR	Squad
(Bangladesh) 1998	Semi-finals	3/9	2	1	1	0	0	Squad
(Kenya) 2000	Runners-up	2/11	4	3	1	0	0	Squad
(Sri Lanka) 2002	Champions	1/12	4	3	0	0	1	Squad
(England) 2004	Group stage	7/12	2	1	1	0	0	Squad
(India) 2006	Group stage	5/10	3	1	2	0	0	Squad
(South Africa) 2009	Group stage	5/8	3	1	1	0	1	Squad
(England) (Wales) 2013	Champions	1/8	5	5	0	0	0	Squad
(England) (Wales) 2017	Runners-up	2/8	5	3	2	0	0	Squad
(Pakistan) (United Arab Emirates) 2025	Champions	1/8	5	5	0	0	0	Squad
(India) 2029	Qualified as hosts							
Total	3 Titles	9/9	33	23	8	0	2	

== 1998 ICC KnockOut Trophy ==
Squad

- Mohammad Azharuddin (C)
- Sourav Ganguly
- Rahul Dravid
- Sachin Tendulkar
- Anil Kumble
- Ajit Agarkar
- Nayan Mongia (Wk)
- Ajay Jadeja
- Sunil Joshi
- Venkatesh Prasad
- Javagal Srinath
- Robin Singh
- V.V.S.Laxman

Source:ESPN Achieve

Result

Event	Quarter Final	Semifinal	Final	Overall Result
Event	Opposition Result	Opposition Result	Opposition Result	Overall Result
1998	Australia; W by 44 runs	West Indies; L by 6 wickets	Did not advance	Semi final

== 2000 ICC KnockOut Trophy ==
Squad

- Sourav Ganguly (C)
- Rahul Dravid
- Sachin Tendulkar
- Anil Kumble
- Ajit Agarkar
- Vijay Dahiya (Wk)
- Zaheer Khan
- Sunil Joshi
- Venkatesh Prasad
- Yuvraj Singh
- Robin Singh
- Vinod Kambli
- Hemang Badani
- Sridharan Sriram

Source:ESPN Achieve

Result

Event	Quarter Final	Semifinal	Final	Overall Result
Event	Opposition Result	Opposition Result	Opposition Result	Overall Result
2000	Australia; W by 20 runs	South Africa; W by 95 runs	New Zealand; L by 6 wickets	Runners-up

== 2002 ICC Champions Trophy ==
Squad

- Sourav Ganguly (C)
- Rahul Dravid (Vice-Captain)
- Sachin Tendulkar
- Virender Sehwag
- Dinesh Mongia (Wk)
- Mohammad Kaif
- Anil Kumble
- Harbhajan Singh
- Zaheer Khan
- Ajit Agarkar
- Yuvraj Singh
- Jai Prakash Yadav
- Ashish Nehra
- VVS Laxman
- Javagal Srinath

Source:ESPN Achieve

Result

Event	Group Stage			Semifinal	Final	Overall Result
Event	Opposition Result	Opposition Result	Rank	Opposition Result	Opposition Result	Overall Result
2002	Zimbabwe; W by 14 runs	England; W by 8 wickets	1	South Africa; W by 10 runs	Sri Lanka; No Result both are declared as winners	Winners

== 2004 ICC Champions Trophy ==
Squad

- Sourav Ganguly (C)
- Rahul Dravid
- Virender Sehwag
- Dinesh Karthik (Wk)
- Mohammad Kaif
- Anil Kumble
- Harbhajan Singh
- Rohan Gavaskar
- Ajit Agarkar
- Yuvraj Singh
- Irfan Pathan
- Ashish Nehra
- VVS Laxman
- Lakshmipathy Balaji

Source:CREX

Result

Event	Group Stage			Semifinal	Final	Overall Result
Event	Opposition Result	Opposition Result	Rank	Opposition Result	Opposition Result	Overall Result
2004	Kenya; W by 98 runs	Pakistan; L by 3 wickets	2	Did not advance	Did not advance	Group Stage

== 2006 ICC Champions Trophy ==
Squad

- Rahul Dravid (C)
- Sachin Tendulkar
- Virender Sehwag
- Dinesh Mongia
- Mohammad Kaif
- Munaf Patel
- Harbhajan Singh
- Suresh Raina
- Ajit Agarkar
- Yuvraj Singh
- M.S.Dhoni (Wk)
- Irfan Pathan
- R.P. Singh
- Ramesh Powar

Source:ESPNCricinfo

Result

Event	Group Stage				Semifinal	Final	Overall Result
Event	Opposition Result	Opposition Result	Opposition Result	Rank	Opposition Result	Opposition Result	Overall Result
2006	England; W by 4 wickets	West Indies; L by 3 wickets	Australia; L by 6 wickets	3	Did not advance	Did not advance	Group Stage

== 2009 ICC Champions Trophy ==
Squad

- Mahendra Singh Dhoni (C) & (Wk)
- Sachin Tendulkar
- Suresh Raina
- Rahul Dravid
- Gautam Gambhir
- Harbhajan Singh
- Dinesh Karthik
- Praveen Kumar
- Amit Mishra
- Abhishek Nayar
- Ashish Nehra
- Yusuf Pathan
- Ishant Sharma
- R.P. Singh
- Virat Kohli

Source:ESPNCricinfo

Result

Event	Group Stage				Semifinal	Final	Overall Result
Event	Opposition Result	Opposition Result	Opposition Result	Rank	Opposition Result	Opposition Result	Overall Result
2009	Pakistan; L by 54 runs	Australia; No result	West Indies; W by 7 wickets	3	Did not advance	Did not advance	Group Stage

== 2013 ICC Champions Trophy ==
Squad

- Mahendra Singh Dhoni (C) & (Wk)
- Suresh Raina
- Virat Kohli
- Shikhar Dhawan
- Rohit Sharma
- Ravichandran Ashwin
- Ravindra Jadeja
- Dinesh Karthik
- Bhuvneshwar Kumar
- Vinay Kumar
- Amit Mishra
- Irfan Pathan
- Ishant Sharma
- Murali Vijay
- Umesh Yadav

Source:ESPNCricinfo

Result

Event	Group Stage				Semifinal	Final	Overall Result
Event	Opposition Result	Opposition Result	Opposition Result	Rank	Opposition Result	Opposition Result	Overall Result
2013	South Africa; W by 26 runs	West Indies; W by 8 wickets	Pakistan; W by 8 wickets (DLS method)	1	Sri Lanka; W by 8 wickets	England; W by 5 runs	Winners

== 2017 ICC Champions Trophy ==
Squad

- Virat Kohli (C)
- Mahendra Singh Dhoni (Wk)
- Shikhar Dhawan
- Rohit Sharma
- Ajinkya Rahane
- Yuvraj Singh
- Kedar Jadhav
- Ravichandran Ashwin
- Ravindra Jadeja
- Hardik Pandya
- Bhuvneshwar Kumar
- Jasprit Bumrah
- Mohammed Shami
- Umesh Yadav
- Dinesh Karthik

Source:ESPNCricinfo

Result

Event	Group Stage				Semifinal	Final	Overall Result
Event	Opposition Result	Opposition Result	Opposition Result	Rank	Opposition Result	Opposition Result	Overall Result
2013	Pakistan; W by 124 runs (DLS method)	Sri Lanka; L by 7 wickets	South Africa; W by 8 wickets	1	Bangladesh; W by 9 wickets	Pakistan; L by 180 runs	Runners-up

== 2025 ICC Champions Trophy ==
Squad

- Rohit Sharma (C)
- Shubman Gill (VC)
- Varun Chakravarthy
- Shreyas Iyer
- Ravindra Jadeja
- Virat Kohli
- Hardik Pandya
- Rishabh Pant (Wk)
- Axar Patel
- KL Rahul (Wk)
- Harshit Rana
- Mohammed Shami
- Arshdeep Singh
- Washington Sundar
- Kuldeep Yadav

Source:ICC

Result

Event	Group Stage				Semifinal	Final	Overall Result
Event	Opposition Result	Opposition Result	Opposition Result	Rank	Opposition Result	Opposition Result	Overall Result
2025	Bangladesh; W by 6 wickets	Pakistan; W by 6 wickets	New Zealand; W by 44 runs	1	Australia; W by 4 wickets	New Zealand; W by 4 wickets	Winners

== See also ==
- ICC Champions Trophy
- India at the Cricket World Cup
- India at the ICC Men's T20 World Cup
