= India at the Cricket World Cup =

Tournament Performance

- Flag of India
- Cricket format: One Day International
- Host(s): 1987, 1996, 2011, 2023
- Champions: 2 (1983, 2011)
- Runners-up: 2 (2003, 2023)
- Most runs: Sachin Tendulkar (2278)
- Most wickets: Mohammed Shami (55)

The India national cricket team is a full member of the International Cricket Council (ICC), of the governing body of cricket. There have been thirteen editions of the Cricket World Cup, a quadrennial event hosted by the ICC in the ODI format since 1975. India has participated in every edition of the Cricket World Cup since its introduction. India has won it twice in 1983 and 2011, and is amongst the only three teams to have won it more than once.

In the first two editions in 1975 and 1979, the Indian team captained by Srinivasaraghavan Venkataraghavan won only a single match and did not progress past the group stage. Kapil Dev led the India team in the third edition of the World Cup in 1983. India registered its first ever World Cup victories over West Indies, Australia and England cricket teams en route to the final. It won the World Cup for the first time after defeating the West Indies, who had won the inaugural two editions of the World Cup. India hosted its first World Cup in 1987, but could not defend the title and was eliminated in the semifinals. The Indian team was captained by Mohammad Azharuddin for the next three editions with the best result being reaching the semifinals in the 1996 edition, co-hosted by India.

The Indian side led by Sourav Ganguly reached its second World Cup final in 2003 and finished as runners-up. India was eliminated in the group stage in the next edition, having lost both the matches it played. In the 2011 edition co-hosted by India, the Indian team led by MS Dhoni progressed to the quarterfinals after four wins from six matches in the group stage. India defeated three-time defending champions Australia in the quarterfinals, before defeating the Sri Lanka cricket team in the finals to lift its second World Cup title. India won 14 of the 17 matches it played across the next two editions, but did not progress beyond the semifinals in both the tournaments. In the 2023 edition hosted exclusively by India, the Rohit Sharma-led Indian team did not lose a single match en route to the final. In the fourth final appearance at the World Cups, India lost to Australia and finished as runners-up for the second time.

Sachin Tendulkar is the leading run scorer for India with 2278 runs and holds the record for the most runs across World Cups. Mohammed Shami is the leading wicket taking bowler for India with 55 wickets. Virat Kohli holds the record for the most runs scored in a single edition of the World Cup with 765 runs in the 2023 World Cup. Rohit Sharma has scored seven centuries across World Cups with five in a single edition in 2019.

== Cricket World Cup Record ==
Result summary
Host and Year	Result	Matches	Won	Lost	Tied	No Result	Captain
(England) 1975	Round 1	3	1	2	0	0	S Venkataraghavan
(England) 1979	Round 1	3	0	3	0	0	S Venkataraghavan
(England) (Wales) 1983	Champions	8	6	2	0	0	Kapil Dev
(India) (Pakistan) 1987^{$}	Semi-finals	7	5	2	0	0	Kapil Dev
(Australia) (New Zealand) 1992	Round 1	8	2	5	0	1	Mohammad Azharuddin
(India) (Pakistan) (Sri Lanka) 1996^{$}	Semi-finals	7	4	3	0	0	Mohammad Azharuddin
(England) (Republic of Ireland) (Netherlands) (Scotland) (Wales) 1999	Round 2 (Super 6s)	8	4	4	0	0	Mohammad Azharuddin
(South Africa) (Zimbabwe) (Kenya) 2003	Runners-up	11	9	2	0	0	Sourav Ganguly
(Cricket West Indies) 2007	Group Stage	3	1	2	0	0	Rahul Dravid
(India) (Sri Lanka) (Bangladesh) 2011^{$}	Champions	9	7	1	1	0	MS Dhoni
(Australia) (New Zealand) 2015	Semi-finals	8	7	1	0	0	MS Dhoni
(England) (Wales) 2019	Semi-finals	10	7	2	0	1	Virat Kohli
(India) 2023^{$}	Runners-Up	11	10	1	0	0	Rohit Sharma
Total	2 titles	96	63	30	1	2	

^{$}Red box indicates that the tournament was hosted or co-hosted by India

== By opposition ==
Won more matches than lost
Won equal matches to lost
Lost more matches than won

Result by opponent
Opponent	Matches	Won	Lost	Tied	No Result	Win %	First played
Afghanistan	2	2	0	0	0	100.00	22 June 2019
Australia	14	5	9	0	0	35.71	13 June 1983
Bangladesh	5	4	1	0	0	80.00	17 March 2007
Bermuda	1	1	0	0	0	100.00	19 March 2007
East Africa	1	1	0	0	0	100.00	11 June 1975
England	9	4	4	1	0	44.44	7 June 1975
Ireland	2	2	0	0	0	100.00	6 March 2011
Kenya	4	4	0	0	0	100.00	18 February 1996
Namibia	1	1	0	0	0	100.00	23 February 2003
Netherlands	3	3	0	0	0	100.00	12 February 2003
New Zealand	10	5	5	0	0	50.00	14 June 1975
Pakistan	8	8	0	0	0	100.00	4 March 1992
South Africa	6	3	3	0	0	50.00	15 March 1992
Sri Lanka	10	5	4	0	1	50.00	18 June 1979
United Arab Emirates	1	1	0	0	0	100.00	28 February 2015
West Indies	9	6	3	0	0	66.66	9 June 1979
Zimbabwe	9	8	1	0	0	88.89	11 June 1983
Total	95	63	30	1	1	66.31	7 June 1975

== 1975 World Cup ==
Squad

Manager: Gulabrai Ramchand

Player	Date of birth	Batting style	Bowling style	First class team
Srinivasaraghavan Venkataraghavan (c)	21 April 1945	Right-handed	Right-arm offbreak	Tamil Nadu
Syed Abid Ali	9 September 1941	Right-handed	Right-arm medium-fast	Hyderabad
Mohinder Amarnath	24 September 1950	Right-handed	Right-arm medium	Delhi
Bishen Singh Bedi	25 September 1946	Right-handed	Left-arm slow orthodox	Delhi
Farokh Engineer (wk)	25 February 1938	Right-handed	Wicket-keeper	Bombay
Anshuman Gaekwad	23 September 1952	Right-handed	Right-arm offbreak	Baroda
Sunil Gavaskar	10 July 1949	Right-handed	Right-arm medium	Bombay
Karsan Ghavri	28 February 1951	Left-handed	Left-arm medium	Bombay
Syed Kirmani (wk)	29 December 1949	Right-handed	Wicket-keeper	Karnataka
Madan Lal	20 March 1951	Right-handed	Right-handed medium	Delhi
Brijesh Patel	24 November 1952	Right-handed	Right-arm offbreak	Karnataka
Parthasarathy Sharma	5 January 1948	Right-handed	Right-arm medium	Rajasthan
Eknath Solkar	19 March 1948	Left-handed	Left-arm slow orthodox	Bombay
Gundappa Viswanath	12 February 1949	Right-handed	Right-arm legbreak	Karnataka

Source: The Times

Summary

The 1975 Cricket World Cup was the inaugural edition of the tournament held in England in June 1975. The format consisted of a group stage, in which each team played the other three teams in its group of four once and the top two teams advanced to the semifinals. India was placed in Group B along with England, New Zealand and East Africa. The Indian team was led by Srinivas Venkataraghavan and was relatively inexperienced at ODI cricket, having played their first match only a year earlier during the tour of England in 1974.

India played its first match against England at Lord's. Chasing a target of 334, India scored 132 runs in 60 overs and lost by a margin of 202 runs. India won the next match against East Africa at Headingley in Leeds by ten wickets. After medium pacer Madan Lal took three wickets to restrict the East African team to a total of 120 runs, India chased the target without losing a single wicket with opener Sunil Gavaskar top-scoring with 65 runs from 86 balls. India played its last group stage match against New Zealand at Old Trafford in Manchester. Batting first, India scored 230 runs with Syed Abid Ali top scoring with 70 runs from 98 balls. New Zealand chased the target with four wickets to spare with opener Glenn Turner scoring a century (114 not out from 177 balls). India finished third in the group and failed to qualify for the next round as only the top two teams progressed to the semifinals.

Results
Event	Group stage				Semifinal	Final	Overall Result
Event	Opposition Result	Opposition Result	Opposition Result	Rank	Opposition Result	Opposition Result	Overall Result
1975	England; Lost by 202 runs	East Africa; Won by 10 wickets	New Zealand; Lost by 4 wickets	3	Did not advance		Group Stage

== 1979 World Cup ==
Squad

Player	Date of birth	Batting style	Bowling style	First class team
Srinivasaraghavan Venkataraghavan (c)	21 April 1945	Right-handed	Right arm offbreak	Tamil Nadu
Mohinder Amarnath	24 September 1950	Right-handed	Right arm medium	Delhi
Bishan Singh Bedi	25 September 1946	Right-handed	Left arm slow orthodox	Delhi
Anshuman Gaekwad	23 September 1952	Right-handed	Right arm offbreak	Baroda
Sunil Gavaskar	10 July 1949	Right-handed	Right arm medium	Bombay
Karsan Ghavri	28 February 1951	Left-handed	Left arm medium	Bombay
Kapil Dev	6 January 1959	Right-handed	Right arm fast-medium	Haryana
Surinder Khanna (wk)	3 June 1956	Right-handed	Wicket-keeper	Delhi
Brijesh Patel	24 November 1952	Right-handed	Right arm offbreak	Karnataka
Dilip Vengsarkar	6 April 1956	Right-handed	Right arm medium	Bombay
Gundappa Viswanath	12 February 1949	Right-handed	Right arm legbreak	Karnataka
Bharath Reddy	12 November 1954	Right-handed	Wicket-keeper	Tamil Nadu
Yajurvindra Singh	1 August 1952	Right-handed	Right arm medium	Maharashtra
Yashpal Sharma	11 August 1954	Right-handed	Right arm medium	Punjab

Source: Cricinfo

Summary

The 1979 Cricket World Cup was the second edition of the tournament and was again held in England. The format remained the same as the last edition and consisted of a group stage, in which each team played the other three teams in its group once. India was placed in Group B along with West Indies, New Zealand and Sri Lanka. The Indian team was led by Venkataraghavan for the second consecutive world cup.

India lost its first match to reigning champions West Indies by nine wickets at Edgbaston in Birmingham. India were bowled out for 190 with Vishwanath top scoring with 75 runs while West Indian opener Gordon Greenidge scored an unbeaten century in the subsequent chase. In their next match against New Zealand at Headingley, India were all out for 182 with Gavaskar being the only Indian batter to cross half-century in the match with 55 runs. New Zealand chased the target with 18 balls to spare and won by eight wickets with Bruce Edgar scoring 84 runs. India's last match in the group stage was against Sri Lanka at Old Trafford in Manchester. Chasing a target of 239 runs, India were bowled out for 191 runs and lost by 47 runs. India finished last in the group with no points and failed to qualify for the next round as only the top two teams progressed to the semifinals.

Results
Event	Group stage				Semifinal	Final	Overall Result
Event	Opposition Result	Opposition Result	Opposition Result	Rank	Opposition Result	Opposition Result	Overall Result
1979	West Indies; Lost by 9 wickets	New Zealand; Lost by 8 wickets	Sri Lanka; Lost by 47 runs	4	Did not advance		Group Stage

== 1983 World Cup ==
Squad

Manager: P. R. Man Singh

Player	Date of birth	Batting style	Bowling style	First class team
Kapil Dev (c)	6 January 1959 (Age 24)	Right hand	Right arm fast-medium	Haryana
Mohinder Amarnath	24 September 1950 (Age 33)	Right hand	Right arm medium	Delhi
Kirti Azad	2 January 1959 (Age 24)	Right-hand	Right-arm off-spinner	Delhi
Roger Binny	19 July 1955 (Age 28)	Right-hand	Right-arm fast-medium	Karnataka
Sunil Gavaskar	10 July 1949 (Age 34)	Right hand	Right arm medium	Mumbai
Syed Kirmani (wk)	29 December 1949 (Age 34)	Right-handed	Wicket-keeper	Karnataka
Madan Lal	20 March 1951 (Age 32)	Right-hand	Right-arm medium	Delhi
Sandip Patil	18 August 1956 (Age 27)	Right-hand	Right-arm medium	Mumbai
Balwinder Sandhu	3 August 1956 (Age 27)	Right-handed	Right arm medium-fast	Mumbai
Yashpal Sharma	11 August 1954 (Age 29)	Right-handed	Right-arm medium	Punjab
Ravi Shastri	27 May 1962 (Age 21)	Right-hand	Slow left-arm orthodox	Mumbai
Krishnamachari Srikkanth	21 December 1959 (Age 24)	Right hand	Right-arm medium	Tamil Nadu
Sunil Valson	2 October 1958 (Age 25)	Right-hand	Left-arm medium	Delhi
Dilip Vengsarkar	6 April 1956 (Age 27)	Right hand	Right arm medium	Bhopal

Summary

The 1983 Cricket World Cup was the third consecutive edition of the tournament to be held in England. The format remained the same as the last edition and consisted of a group stage with the only change being that every team played the other three teams in its group twice. India was placed in Group B with West Indies, Australia and Zimbabwe. The Indian team was led by Kapil Dev.

India's first match in the tournament was against two-time defending champions West Indies in Manchester. India scored an upset win by 34 runs. Batting first, India scored 262 runs with Yashpal Sharma top scoring with 89 runs and then bowled out West Indies for 228 with Roger Binny and Ravi Shastri taking three wickets each. India won its second match against Zimbabwe at Leicester. Madan Lal took three wickets to restrict Zimbabwe to 155 runs and India chased the target with Sandeep Patil top scoring with 50 runs. India lost the next match to Australia at Trent Bridge in Nottingham by 162 runs. Batting first, Australia scored 320 runs before bowling out India for 158 runs. India lost its fourth match against the West Indies at The Oval in London by 66 runs. India were bowled out for 216 runs while chasing a target of 283 runs with Mohinder Amarnath top scoring with 80 runs. In the penultimate match of the group stage, India defeated Zimbabwe by 31 runs at Tunbridge Wells. India lost the first five wickets for 17 runs before the Indian captain Kapil Dev scored 175 runs from 138 balls, which was then the highest individual score in ODI cricket. India last match in the group stage against Australia took place at Chelmsford. Batting first, India were all out for 247 runs and chasing 248 runs to win, Australia were all out for 129 runs with Lal and Binny taking four wickets each. India finished second in their group and qualified for the semifinals for the first time.

India's semifinal match was against hosts England at Manchester. Batting first, England were all out for 213 runs with Dev taking three wickets. India chased the target with Sharma and Patil scoring half-centuries, to win by six wickets. The result meant that India progressed to the World Cup final for the first time, where it faced the West Indies on 25 June 1983 at Lord's in London. In the final, India batted first and were all out for 183 runs with Krishnamachari Srikkanth top scoring with 38 runs. Chasing a target of 184 runs for a third consecutive world cup win, West Indies were bowled out for 140 runs with Amarnath and Lal taking three wickets each. The result meant that India won their first ever World Cup and became the first team other than West Indies to lift the World Cup. Amarnath was awarded the Man of the Match in both the semi-finals and finals. Binny finished as the highest wicket taker in the tournament with 18 dismissals. India's victory in 1983 was a major turning point for Indian as well as world cricket as the win increased the popularity of cricket in India, leading to increased audience and revenues.

Results
Event	Group stage							Semifinal	Final	Overall Result
Event	Opposition Result	Opposition Result	Opposition Result	Opposition Result	Opposition Result	Opposition Result	Rank	Opposition Result	Opposition Result	Overall Result
1983	West Indies; Won by 34 runs	Zimbabwe; Won by 5 wickets	Australia; Lost by 162 runs	West Indies; Lost by 66 runs	Zimbabwe; Won by 31 runs	Australia; Won by 118 runs	2Q	England; Won by 6 wickets	West Indies; Won by 43 runs	Winner

== 1987 World Cup ==
Squad

Manager: P. R. Man Singh

Player	Date of birth	Batting style	Bowling style	First class team
Kapil Dev (c)	6 January 1959	Right hand	Right arm fast-medium	Haryana
Mohammad Azharuddin	8 February 1963	Right hand	Right-arm medium	Hyderabad
Roger Binny	19 July 1955	Right hand	Right arm fast-medium	Karnataka
Sunil Gavaskar	10 July 1949	Right hand	Right arm medium	Bombay
Maninder Singh	13 June 1965	Right hand	Slow left-arm orthodox	Delhi
Kiran More (wk)	4 September 1962	Right hand	Wicket-keeper	Baroda
Chandrakant Pandit	30 September 1961	Right hand	Wicket-keeper	Bombay
Manoj Prabhakar	15 April 1963	Right hand	Right-arm medium	Delhi
Chetan Sharma	3 January 1966	Right hand	Right arm fast-medium	Haryana
Ravi Shastri	27 May 1962	Right hand	Slow left-arm orthodox	Bombay
Navjot Singh Sidhu	20 October 1963	Right hand	Right-arm medium	Punjab
Laxman Sivaramakrishnan	31 December 1965	Right hand	Right-arm leg break	Tamil Nadu
Krishnamachari Srikkanth	21 December 1959	Right hand	Right-arm medium	Tamil Nadu
Dilip Vengsarkar	6 April 1956	Right hand	Right arm medium	Bombay

Summary

The 1987 Cricket World Cup was the first tournament to be held outside England and was co-hosted by India and Pakistan. The format remained the same as the last edition but the matches were reduced to 50 overs-a-side from 60 overs used in the earlier tournaments. India was placed in Group A with Australia, New Zealand and Zimbabwe. The Indian team was led by Kapil Dev for the second consecutive tournament.

India played the first match of the tournament against Australia at M. A. Chidambaram Stadium in Madras. Chasing a target of 271 runs for victory, India, whose score at one stage was 207/2 with half-centuries from Srikkanth and Navjot Sidhu, were all out for 269 runs and lost by one run. India won their next match against New Zealand at Bangalore by 16 runs. After scoring 252 runs while batting first with half-centuries from Sidhu and Dev, India bowled out New Zealand for 236. India won the next match against Zimbabwe by eight wickets at Wankhede Stadium in Bombay before it beat Australia in the fourth match at Delhi. India scored 289 runs with half-centuries from four Indian batters before bowling out Australia for 233 to win by 56 runs. India won the next group stage match against Zimbabwe at Ahmedabad by seven wickets. In the last group stage match against New Zealand, India chased a target of 222 with 18 overs to spare. In the first innings of the match, Chetan Sharma took a hat-trick, the first ever by an Indian bowler and the first in a World Cup. Indian batter Gavaskar registered the only ODI century of his career in the match. With five wins in six matches, India topped its group and qualified for the semifinals, where it played England at Bombay.

In the semifinal, England scored 254 runs with century from opener Graham Gooch after being asked to bat first. India were all out for 219 and lost by 35 runs. Gavaskar was the highest run scorer for India in the tournament with 300 runs, and was one of the top ten batsmen in terms of runs scored. His partnership of 136 runs with Srikkanth against New Zealand at Nagpur was the highest partnership for any wicket in the tournament. left-arm spinner Maninder Singh was the best bowler for India with 14 wickets. Wicketkeeper Kiran More, with 11 dismissals, effected the most dismissals in the tournament.

Results
Event	Group stage							Semifinal	Final	Overall Result
Event	Opposition Result	Opposition Result	Opposition Result	Opposition Result	Opposition Result	Opposition Result	Rank	Opposition Result	Opposition Result	Overall Result
1987	Australia; Lost by 1 run	New Zealand; Won by 16 runs	Zimbabwe; Won by 8 wickets	Australia; Won by 56 runs	Zimbabwe; Won by 7 wickets	New Zealand; Won by 9 wickets	1Q	England; Lost by 35 runs	Did not advance	Semi-finals

== 1992 World Cup ==
Squad

Coach: Abbas Ali Baig

Player	Date of birth	Batting style	Bowling style	First class team
Mohammad Azharuddin (c)	8 February 1963	Right-handed	Right-arm medium	Hyderabad
Pravin Amre	14 August 1968	Right-handed	Right-arm leg break	Bengal
Subroto Banerjee	13 February 1969	Right-handed	Right-arm medium-fast	Bihar
Kapil Dev	6 January 1959	Right-handed	Right-arm fast-medium	Haryana
Ajay Jadeja	1 February 1971	Right-handed	Right-arm medium	Haryana
Vinod Kambli	18 January 1972	Left-handed	Right-arm off-break	Bombay
Sanjay Manjrekar	12 July 1965	Right-handed	Right arm off-spin	Bombay
Kiran More (wk)	4 September 1962	Right-handed	Wicket-keeper	Baroda
Manoj Prabhakar	15 April 1963	Right-handed	Right-arm medium	Delhi
Venkatapathy Raju	9 July 1969	Right-handed	Slow left-arm orthodox	Hyderabad
Ravi Shastri	27 May 1962	Right-handed	Slow left-arm orthodox	Bombay
Krishnamachari Srikkanth	21 December 1959	Right-handed	Right-arm medium	Tamil Nadu
Javagal Srinath	31 August 1969	Right-handed	Right arm fast	Karnataka
Sachin Tendulkar	24 April 1973	Right-handed	Right-arm medium	Bombay

Summary

The 1992 Cricket World Cup was held in Australia and New Zealand. A new format was introduced for the 1992 World Cup, with the group format scrapped in favour of a round-robin format. Each team played all the other eight teams in the tournament once and the top four teams at the end of the Round-Robin stage progressed to the semifinals. It was also the first World Cup played with colored jerseys and which had day-night matches.

India's first match in the tournament was against England at Perth. England won the match by nine runs after bowling India out for 227 runs while chasing a target of 237. The second match against Sri Lanka at Mackay was abandoned due to rain after just two balls. Srikkanth holds the unusual record of scoring the only run ever scored in international cricket at the Ray Mitchell Oval, in Mackay as the ground did not host any other international match. In the third match against co-hosts and defending champions Australia at The Gabba in Brisbane, India lost by one run in a repeat of the result from the previous World Cup. Chasing a revised target of 235 in a rain affected match, India were all out for 234 with Mohammed Azharuddin top scoring with 93 runs. India next played Pakistan at Sydney, which was the first ever encounter between the teams in a World Cup. India scored 216 runs in a match reduced to 49 overs due to rain with Sachin Tendulkar top-scoring with 54 runs and bowled out Pakistan for 173 runs to win by 43 runs.

In the next match against Zimbabwe at Seddon Park in Hamilton, India won the rain-curtailed match by 55 runs. India next played the West Indies at Basin Reserve in Wellington, in which West Indies chased a target of 195 with six overs to spare to beat India by five wickets. India lost the final two matches against co-hosts New Zealand at Dunedin and World Cup debutants South Africa at Adelaide Oval. In the earlier match, India scored 230 runs with half-centuries from Tendulkar and Azharuddin and the target was chased down by New Zealand. Against South Africa, the match was reduced to 30 overs due to rain and India scored 180 runs with Azharuddin top scoring with 79 runs, but lost the match by six wickets. With only two wins, India finished seventh amongst the nine teams in the group stage and failed to qualify for the semi-finals. The tournament was won by Pakistan, one of the two teams beaten by India in the group stage. India's highest scorer in the tournament was Azharuddin with 332 runs and amongst the bowlers, Manoj Prabhakar was the leading wicket taker with 12 wickets.

Results
Event	Group stage									Semifinal	Final	Overall Result
Event	Opposition Result	Opposition Result	Opposition Result	Opposition Result	Opposition Result	Opposition Result	Opposition Result	Opposition Result	Rank	Opposition Result	Opposition Result	Overall Result
1992	England; Lost by 9 runs	Sri Lanka; No Result	Australia; Lost by 1 run	Pakistan; Won by 43 runs	Zimbabwe; Won by 55 runs	West Indies; Lost by 5 wickets	New Zealand; Lost by 4 wickets	South Africa; Lost by 6 wickets	7	Did not advance		Group Stage

== 1996 World Cup ==
Squad

Coach: Ajit Wadekar

Player	Date of birth	Batting style	Bowling style	First class team
Mohammad Azharuddin (c)	8 February 1963	Right-handed	Right-arm medium	Hyderabad
Salil Ankola	1 March 1968	Right hand	Right-arm fast	Mumbai
Ajay Jadeja	1 February 1971	Right-handed	Right-arm medium	Haryana
Vinod Kambli	18 January 1972	Left-handed	Right-arm off-break	Bombay
Aashish Kapoor	25 March 1971	Right hand	Right-arm offbreak	Punjab
Anil Kumble	17 October 1970	Right-handed	Right-arm leg spin	Karnataka
Sanjay Manjrekar	12 July 1965	Right-handed	Right arm off-spin	Bombay
Nayan Mongia (wk)	19 December 1969	Right-handed	Wicket-keeper	Baroda
Manoj Prabhakar	15 April 1963	Right-handed	Right-arm medium	Delhi
Venkatesh Prasad	5 August 1969	Right-handed	Right-arm medium-fast	Karnataka
Venkatapathy Raju	9 July 1969	Right hand	Slow left-arm orthodox	Hyderabad
Navjot Singh Sidhu	20 October 1963	Right hand	Right-arm medium	Punjab
Javagal Srinath	31 August 1969	Right-handed	Right arm fast	Karnataka
Sachin Tendulkar	24 April 1973	Right-handed	Right-arm medium	Mumbai

Summary

The 1996 Cricket World Cup was co-hosted by India, Pakistan and Sri Lanka. The tournament went back to the group format which was last used in the 1987 edition. Each team played the other five teams in the six team group and the top four teams progressed to the quarterfinals. In the group stage, India were placed in Group A with co-hosts Sri Lanka, Australia, West Indies, Zimbabwe and World Cup debutants Kenya.

India started their campaign by defeating Kenya at Cuttack. India restricted Kenya to 199 runs with Anil Kumble taking three wickets and chased down the target to win by seven wickets with Tendulkar scoring a century (127 runs). In the next match against the West Indies at Gwalior, India bowled out West Indies for 173 with Kumble and Prabhakar taking three wickets each. India chased down the target with five wickets to spare with Tendulkar again top scoring with 70 runs. India lost the next match to Australia at Bombay, after being bowled out for 242 runs while chasing a target of 259 runs. In the next match against Sri Lanka in Delhi, India scored 271 runs while batting first with Tendulkar hitting 137 runs, but lost after Sri Lanka chased it down with eight balls remaining. India ended the group stage with a 40-run victory against Zimbabwe at Kanpur with Vinod Kambli top scoring for India with 106 runs. With the win, India finished third in their group and qualified for the quarterfinals, setting up a match against Pakistan at Bangalore.

In the quarter finals, India elected to bat after winning the toss and scored 287 runs with Sidhu top scoring with 93 runs. India then restricted Pakistan to 248 runs to complete the win and qualify for the semifinals. In the semifinals at the Eden Gardens in Calcutta on 13 March 1996, India played Sri Lanka in a match which became notorious for poor crowd behavior. India asked Sri Lanka to bat first, who posted a total of 251/8. In reply, India who were at one stage at 98/1, lost seven wickets for 22 runs to slump to 120/8 in the 35th over, with still 132 runs required to win. At this point, sections of the crowd began rioting because of which the match referee Clive Lloyd decided to abandon the game and awarded the win to Sri Lanka. Tendulkar scored 523 runs at an average of 87.16 and was the leading run scorer of the tournament. Leg-spinner Kumble finished as the leading wicket taker in the tournament with 15 wickets at 18.73 apiece.

Results
Event	Group stage						Quarterfinal	Semifinal	Final	Overall Result
Event	Opposition Result	Opposition Result	Opposition Result	Opposition Result	Opposition Result	Rank	Opposition Result	Opposition Result	Opposition Result	Overall Result
1996	Kenya; Won by 7 wickets	West Indies; Won by 5 wickets	Australia; Lost by 16 runs	Sri Lanka; Lost by 6 wickets	Zimbabwe; Won by 40 runs	3Q	Pakistan; Won by 39 runs	Sri Lanka; Lost by default	Did not advance	Semi-finals

== 1999 World Cup ==
Squad

Coach: Anshuman Gaekwad

Player	Date of birth	Batting style	Bowling style	First class team
Mohammad Azharuddin (c)	8 February 1963	Right-handed	Right-arm medium	Hyderabad
Ajit Agarkar	4 December 1977	Right-handed	Right-arm fast-medium	Mumbai
Nikhil Chopra	19 August 1973	Right-handed	Right-arm offbreak	Uttar Pradesh
Rahul Dravid	11 January 1973	Right-handed	Right arm off spin	Karnataka
Sourav Ganguly	8 July 1972	Left-handed	Right-arm medium	Bengal
Ajay Jadeja	1 February 1971	Right-handed	Right-arm medium	Haryana
Anil Kumble	17 October 1970	Right-handed	Right-arm leg spin	Karnataka
Amay Khurasiya	18 May 1972	Left-handed	Slow Left arm	Madhya Pradesh
Debasis Mohanty	20 July 1976	Right-handed	Right-arm fast-medium	Odisha
Nayan Mongia (wk)	19 December 1969	Right-handed	Wicket-keeper	Baroda
Venkatesh Prasad	5 August 1969	Right-handed	Right-arm medium-fast	Karnataka
Sadagoppan Ramesh	16 October 1975	Left-handed	Right-arm offbreak	Tamil Nadu
Robin Singh	14 September 1963	Left-handed	Right-arm medium-fast	Tamil Nadu
Javagal Srinath	31 August 1969	Right-handed	Right arm fast	Karnataka
Sachin Tendulkar	24 April 1973	Right-handed	Right-arm medium	Mumbai

Summary

The 1999 Cricket World Cup was held in the United Kingdom, Ireland and Netherlands. A new format was introduced for the 1999 World Cup, where teams were divided into two groups of six teams each and the top three teams in each group progressed to the Super Six stage. In the Super Six, a team belonging to one group in the group stage played once against all the three teams that progressed from the other group. India were placed in Group A in the group stage along with hosts England, defending champions Sri Lanka, South Africa, Zimbabwe and Kenya.

India began their campaign with a loss to South Africa at Hove by four wickets. South Africa won after chasing a target of 254 with Sourav Ganguly top scoring for India with 97 runs. In the next match, India lost to Zimbabwe by three runs after being bowled out for 249 runs while chasing a target of 252 runs. In the third match at Bristol, India beat Kenya by 94 runs. Batting first, India scored 329 runs with centuries from Tendulkar (140 not out) and Dravid (104 not out). India then recorded a win against Sri Lanka at Taunton by a margin of 157 runs. Batting first, India scored 373 runs and then Sri Lanka were then bowled out for 216 with Robin Singh taking five wickets. Ganguly scored 183 runs, then the highest ever by an Indian cricketer in ODIs and shared a partnership of 318 runs along with Rahul Dravid (145 runs). India won the final match against hosts England at Edgbaston in Birmingham by 63 runs. In a match extended by a day due to rain, England was bowled out for 169 runs while chasing a target of 233 runs.

India finished second in Group A and qualified for the Super Six stage. The teams carried the points scored against fellow qualifiers from the same group and India carried no points as they lost to both fellow qualifiers South Africa and Zimbabwe. India's first match in the Super Six stage was against Australia at The Oval in London, which they lost by 77 runs. India beat Pakistan in their next match at Old Trafford in Manchester by 47 runs. India scored 227 runs before bowling out Pakistan for 180 runs with Venkatesh Prasad taking five wickets for India. India's last match in the Super Six stage was against New Zealand at Trent Bridge in Nottingham. India lost by five wickets as New Zealand achieved the target of 252 runs with eight balls to spare. Dravid was the leading run-scorer of the tournament with 461 runs at an average of 65.85 and Ganguly, who scored 379 runs, was also amongst the top three run getters in the tournament.

Results
Event	Group stage						Super Six Stage				Semifinal	Final	Overall Result
Event	Opposition Result	Opposition Result	Opposition Result	Opposition Result	Opposition Result	Rank	Opposition Result	Opposition Result	Opposition Result	Rank	Opposition Result	Opposition Result	Overall Result
1999	South Africa; Lost by 4 wickets	Zimbabwe; Lost by 3 runs	Kenya; Won by 94 runs	Sri Lanka; Won by 157 runs	England; Won by 63 runs	2Q	Australia; Lost by 77 runs	Pakistan; Won by 47 runs	New Zealand; Lost by 5 wickets	6	Did not advance		Super Six

== 2003 World Cup ==
Squad

Coach: John Wright

Player	Date of birth	Batting style	Bowling style	First class team
Sourav Ganguly (c)	8 July 1972	Left-handed	Right arm medium	Bengal
Ajit Agarkar	4 December 1977	Right-handed	Right arm fast medium	Mumbai
Sanjay Bangar	11 October 1972	Right-handed	Right arm medium fast	Railways
Rahul Dravid (wk)	11 January 1973	Right-handed	Right arm off spin	Karnataka
Mohammad Kaif	1 December 1980	Right-handed	Right arm off spin	Uttar Pradesh
Zaheer Khan	7 October 1978	Right-handed	Left arm fast medium	Baroda
Anil Kumble	17 October 1970	Right-handed	Right arm leg spin	Karnataka
Dinesh Mongia	17 April 1977	Left-handed	Slow left arm orthodox	Punjab
Ashish Nehra	29 April 1979	Right-handed	Left arm fast medium	Delhi
Parthiv Patel (wk)	9 March 1985	Left-handed	Wicket-Keeper	Gujarat
Virender Sehwag	20 October 1978	Right-handed	Right arm off spin	Delhi
Harbhajan Singh	3 July 1980	Right-handed	Right arm off spin	Punjab
Yuvraj Singh	12 December 1981	Left-handed	Slow left arm orthodox	Punjab
Javagal Srinath	31 August 1969	Right-handed	Right arm fast medium	Karnataka
Sachin Tendulkar	24 April 1973	Right-handed	Right arm leg spin	Mumbai

Summary

The 2003 Cricket World Cup was held in South Africa, Zimbabwe and Kenya. The same format from the previous tournament was used with teams divided into two groups of six teams each and the top three teams in each group progressing to the Super Six stage, where a team belonging to one group in the group stage would play once against all three teams progressing from the other group. In the Group stage, India were placed in Group A, accompanied by co-hosts Zimbabwe, defending champions Australia, Pakistan, England, Netherlands and debutants Namibia.

In the first match against Netherlands at Paarl, India scored 204 runs before bowling out Netherlands for 136 runs to win by 68 runs. India's next match was a loss against Australia at Supersport Park in Centurion. Batting first, India were all out for 125 runs and Australia chased the target in 22.2 overs, losing only one wicket. In the third match in the group stage, India won against co-hosts Zimbabwe by 83 runs at Harare. India scored 255 runs with Tendulkar top scoring with 81 runs and later bowled out Zimbabwe for 172 with Ganguly taking three wickets. This was followed by a 181 run victory over Namibia at Pietermaritzburg. India scored 311 runs with centuries from Tendulkar (152) and Ganguly (112) and bowled out Namibia for 130 runs with Yuvraj Singh taking four wickets. India won the next group match against England by 82 runs at Kingsmead in Durban. Ashish Nehra took six wickets to bowl out England for 168 runs after having set a target of 251 runs. In the next match against Pakistan in Centurion, India chased a target of 274 runs to win by six wickets with Tendulkar top scoring with 98 runs. With five wins, India finished second in Group A and qualified for the Super Six stage.

In the Super Six stage, India won all the three matches and qualified for the semifinals. India beat Kenya at Newlands in Cape Town by six wickets with Ganguly top scoring with 107 runs. In the second match, India beat Sri Lanka at Wanderers Stadium in Johannesburg by 183 runs with Tendulkar top scoring with 97 runs and Srinath taking four wickets for India. India won the final match of the stage against New Zealand at Centurion by seven wickets. Zaheer Khan took four wickets to bundle out New Zealand for 146, which was followed by a successful run chase by India.

In the semifinals, India beat Kenya at Durban by 91 runs. Batting first, India scored 270 runs with Ganguly top scoring with 111 runs and then bowled out Kenya for 179 runs. With this India reached the finals for the first time since 1983, and faced defending champions Australia for the title. The final was played on 23 March 2003 at the Wanderers Stadium in Johannesburg and India elected to field first after winning the toss. Australia scored 359 runs with the Australian captain Ricky Ponting scoring 140 runs and then bowled out India for 234 runs with only Virender Sehwag scoring a half-century, to win the match by 125 runs. Tendulkar was awarded the Man of the Tournament award for being the leading run scorer with 673 runs and Ganguly ended up as the second leading run scorer in the tournament. Khan was the leading wicket taker for India and finished fourth on the overall wicket takers list.

Results
Event	Group stage							Super Six Stage				Semifinal	Final	Overall Result
Event	Opposition Result	Opposition Result	Opposition Result	Opposition Result	Opposition Result	Opposition Result	Rank	Opposition Result	Opposition Result	Opposition Result	Rank	Opposition Result	Opposition Result	Overall Result
2003	Netherlands; Won by 68 runs	Australia; Lost by 9 wickets	Zimbabwe; Won by 83 runs	Namibia; Won by 181 runs	England; Won by 82 runs	Pakistan; Won by 6 wickets	2Q	Kenya; Won by 6 wickets	Sri Lanka; Won by 183 runs	New Zealand; Won by 7 wickets	2Q	Kenya; Won by 91 runs	Australia; Lost by 125 runs	Runner-up

== 2007 World Cup ==
Squad

Coach: Greg Chappell

Player	Date of birth	Batting style	Bowling style	First class team
Rahul Dravid (c)	11 January 1973	Right-handed	Right arm off break	Karnataka
Ajit Agarkar	4 December 1977	Right-handed	Right arm fast	Mumbai
M.S. Dhoni (wk)	7 July 1981	Right-handed	Wicket-keeper	Jharkhand
Sourav Ganguly	8 July 1972	Left-handed	Right arm medium	Bengal
Dinesh Karthik (wk)	1 June 1985	Right-handed	Wicket-keeper	Tamil Nadu
Zaheer Khan	7 October 1978	Right-handed	Left arm fast medium	Mumbai
Anil Kumble	17 October 1970	Right-handed	Right arm leg break	Karnataka
Munaf Patel	12 July 1983	Right-handed	Right arm fast medium	Maharashtra
Irfan Pathan	27 October 1984	Left-handed	Left arm fast medium	Baroda
Virender Sehwag	20 October 1978	Right-handed	Right arm off break	Delhi
Harbhajan Singh	3 July 1980	Right-handed	Right arm off break	Punjab
Yuvraj Singh	12 December 1981	Left-handed	Slow left arm orthodox	Punjab
S. Sreesanth	6 February 1983	Right-handed	Right arm fast medium	Kerala
Sachin Tendulkar	24 April 1973	Right-handed	Right arm leg break	Mumbai
Robin Uthappa	11 November 1985	Right-handed	Right arm medium	Karnataka

Summary

The 2007 Cricket World Cup was held in West Indies for the first time. The number of teams participating in the World Cup increased to 16 and a new format was introduced. The teams were divided into four groups with each team playing against the other three teams in the group once and the top two teams progressed to a Super Eight stage. India were placed in Group B, along with Bangladesh, Sri Lanka and World Cup debutants Bermuda.

India faced neighbors Bangladesh in the first match at Queen's Park Oval in Port of Spain. Batting first, India were bowled out for 191 runs with only Ganguly crossing the half-century mark. Bangladesh chased the target with more than an over to spare and won by five wickets. In the second match at the same venue, India faced Bermuda. Batting first, India scored 413 runs, then highest team total in World Cups. Sehwag top scored for India with a century and three other Indian batters crossed the half-century mark. In response, Bermuda was bowled out for 156 runs and won by 257 runs, then highest margin of victory in World Cups. In the must win last match of the group stage, India lost by 69 runs to Sri Lanka. After being set a target of 255 runs, India was bowled out for 185 runs. India finished third in the group and was eliminated from the tournament, the first time since 1992 that the team failed to progress from the first round.

Results

Event	Group stage				Super Eight		Semifinal	Final	Overall Result
Event	Opposition Result	Opposition Result	Opposition Result	Rank	Opposition Result	Rank	Opposition Result	Opposition Result	Overall Result
2007	Bangladesh; Lost by 5 wickets	Bermuda; Won by 257 runs	Sri Lanka; Lost by 69 runs	3	Did not advance				Group Stage

== 2011 World Cup ==
Coach: Gary Kirsten

Player	Date of birth	Batting style	Bowling style	First class team
M.S. Dhoni (c) and (wk)	7 July 1981	Right-handed	Wicket-keeper	Jharkhand
Ravichandran Ashwin	17 September 1986	Right-handed	Right-arm offbreak	Tamil Nadu
Piyush Chawla	24 December 1988	Left-handed	Right-arm legbreak	Uttar Pradesh
Gautam Gambhir	October 14, 1981	Left-handed	Right-arm legbreak	Delhi
Zaheer Khan	7 October 1978	Right-handed	Left arm fast medium	Mumbai
Virat Kohli	5 November 1988	Right-handed	Right-arm medium	Delhi
Ashish Nehra	29 April 1979	Right-handed	Left-arm medium fast	Delhi
Munaf Patel	12 July 1983	Right-handed	Right arm fast medium	Maharashtra
Yusuf Pathan	17 November 1982	Right-handed	Right-arm offbreak	Baroda
Suresh Raina	27 November 1986	Left-handed	Right-arm offbreak	Uttar Pradesh
Virender Sehwag	20 October 1978	Right-handed	Right arm off break	Delhi
Harbhajan Singh	3 July 1980	Right-handed	Right arm off break	Punjab
Yuvraj Singh	12 December 1981	Left-handed	Slow left arm orthodox	Punjab
S. Sreesanth	6 February 1983	Right-handed	Right arm fast medium	Kerala
Sachin Tendulkar	24 April 1973	Right-handed	Right arm leg break	Mumbai

Summary

The 2011 Cricket World Cup was co-hosted by India, Sri Lanka and Bangladesh. There were 14 teams that participated in the 2011 World Cup and the format reverted to the one used in the 1996 edition. The teams were grouped into two groups of six teams each and the top four teams from each group qualified for the quarterfinals. India were placed in Group B in the Group stage alongside co-hosts Bangladesh, South Africa, England, West Indies, Netherlands and Ireland.

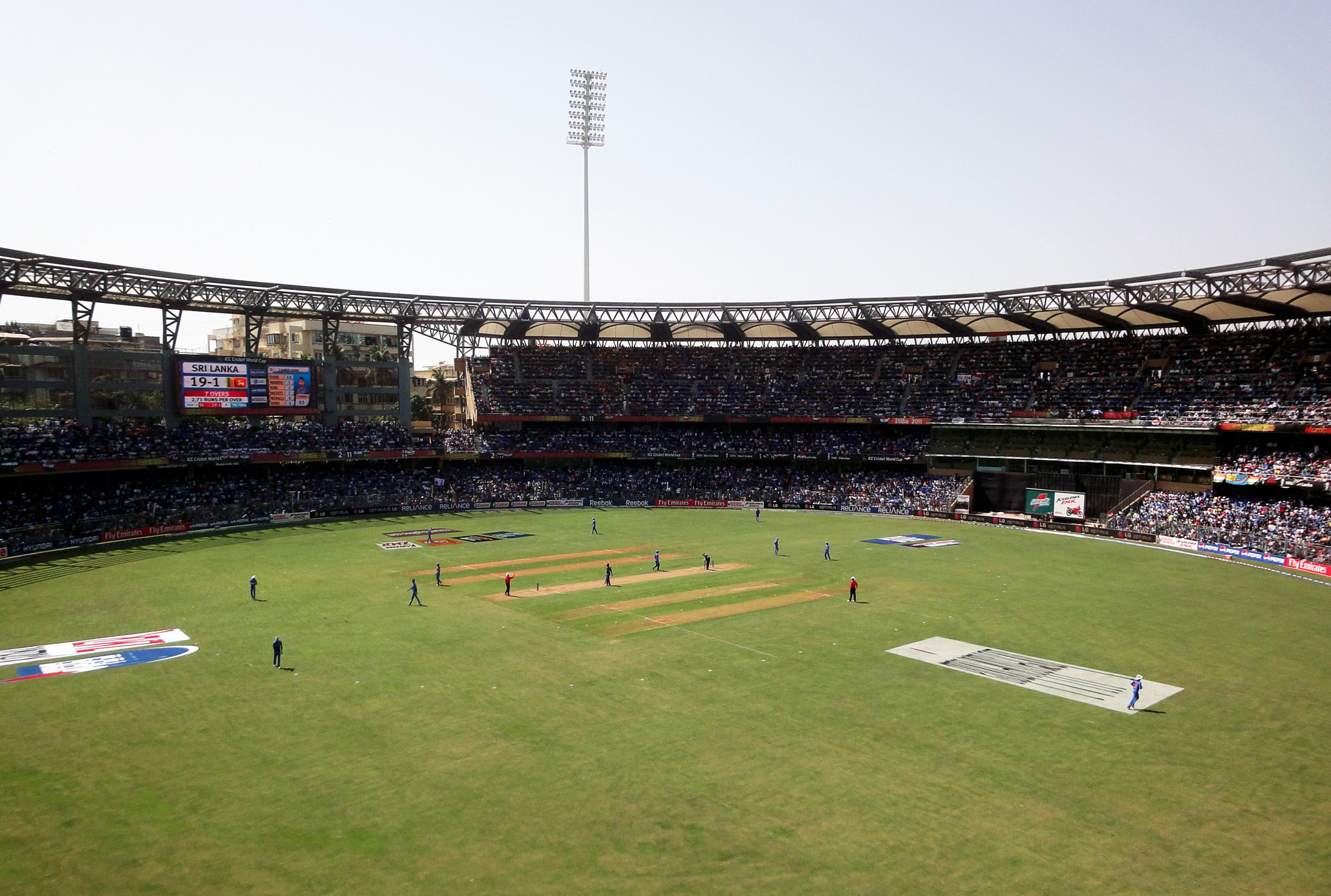
The final of the 2011 Cricket World Cup at the Wankhede Stadium in Mumbai

India began the campaign with a 87-run win against Bangladesh at Dhaka. India scored 370 runs with centuries from Sehwag (175) and Virat Kohli (100 not out) before bowling out Bangladesh for 283 runs with Munaf Patel taking four wickets. The second match between India and England at Bangalore ended in a tie, only the second such instance in a World Cup. India scored 338 runs with Tendulkar top-scoring with 120 runs before England matched the total. In their third group match, India defeated Ireland by five wickets. Ireland were bowled out for 207 runs with Yuvraj taking five wickets and India chased the target with four overs to spare. India followed it up with a win over Netherlands at Delhi in the next match. Netherlands was restricted to 189 all out with Khan taking three wickets and India chased the target with more than 13 overs to spare. In the fifth match of the group stage, India played South Africa at Nagpur, in which India scored 296 runs batting first. South Africa chased the target with two deliveries to spare to hand India its first loss in the competition. In the final group match, India scored an 80-run victory over the West Indies at Chennai. India scored 268 runs with a century from Yuvraj, before bowling out the West Indies for 208 runs.

In the quarterfinals, India faced three-time defending champions Australia at Ahmedabad. Australia scored 260 runs before India chased the target with 14 deliveries to spare with half-centuries from Tendulkar, Gautam Gambhir and Yuvraj. India played Pakistan in the semifinal at Mohali. India chose to bat first after winning the toss and score 260 runs in 50 overs with Tendulkar top scoring with 85 runs. Pakistan was later bowled out for 231 runs and India won the match by 29 runs. India played its third ever World Cup final against Sri Lanka at the Wankhede Stadium in Mumbai. Sri Lanka scored 274 runs in 50 overs with Mahela Jayawardene scoring a century. India lost two wickets within the first seven overs but recovered to chase the target in the 49th over, to win by six wickets. Gambhir (97 runs) and Dhoni (91 not out) scored half-centuries for India during the chase. India secured their second World Cup and the first since 1983. This was also the first instance of any host nation winning the World Cup. Tendulkar scored 482 runs and was the second-highest run scorer in the tournament. Khan was the leading wicket-taker in the tournament with 21 wickets. Yuvraj, who scored 362 runs and took 15 wickets, was named as the Man of the Tournament for his all-round performance.

Results

Event	Group stage							Quarterfinal	Semifinal	Final	Overall Result
Event	Opposition Result	Opposition Result	Opposition Result	Opposition Result	Opposition Result	Opposition Result	Rank	Opposition Result	Opposition Result	Opposition Result	Overall Result
2011	Bangladesh; Won by 87 runs	England; Tied	Ireland; Won by 5 wickets	Netherlands; Won by 5 wickets	South Africa; Lost by 2 wickets	West Indies; Won by 80 runs	2Q	Australia; Won by 5 wickets	Pakistan; Won by 29 runs	Sri Lanka; Won by 6 wickets	Winner

== 2015 World Cup ==
Coach: Duncan Fletcher

Player	Date of birth	Batting style	Bowling style	First class team
M.S. Dhoni (c) and (wk)	7 July 1981	Right-handed	Wicket-keeper	Jharkhand
Ravichandran Ashwin	17 September 1986	Right-handed	Right-arm offbreak	Tamil Nadu
Stuart Binny	3 June 1984	Right-handed	Right-arm medium	Karnataka
Shikhar Dhawan	5 December 1985	Left-handed	Right-arm off break	Delhi
Ravindra Jadeja	6 December 1988	Left-handed	Slow left-arm orthodox	Saurashtra
Virat Kohli	5 November 1988	Right-handed	Right-arm medium	Delhi
Bhuvneshwar Kumar	5 February 1990	Right-handed	Right-arm medium fast	Uttar Pradesh
Axar Patel	20 January 1994	Left-handed	Slow left-arm orthodox	Gujarat
Ajinkya Rahane	5 June 1988	Right-handed	Right-arm medium	Mumbai
Suresh Raina	27 November 1986	Left-handed	Right-arm offbreak	Uttar Pradesh
Ambati Rayudu	23 September 1985	Right-handed	Right-arm off break	Baroda
Mohammed Shami	9 March 1990	Right-handed	Right-arm fast	Bengal
Mohit Sharma	18 September 1988	Right-handed	Right-arm medium fast	Haryana
Rohit Sharma	30 April 1987	Right-handed	Right-arm off break	Mumbai
Umesh Yadav	25 October 1987	Right-handed	Right-arm fast	Vidarbha

Summary

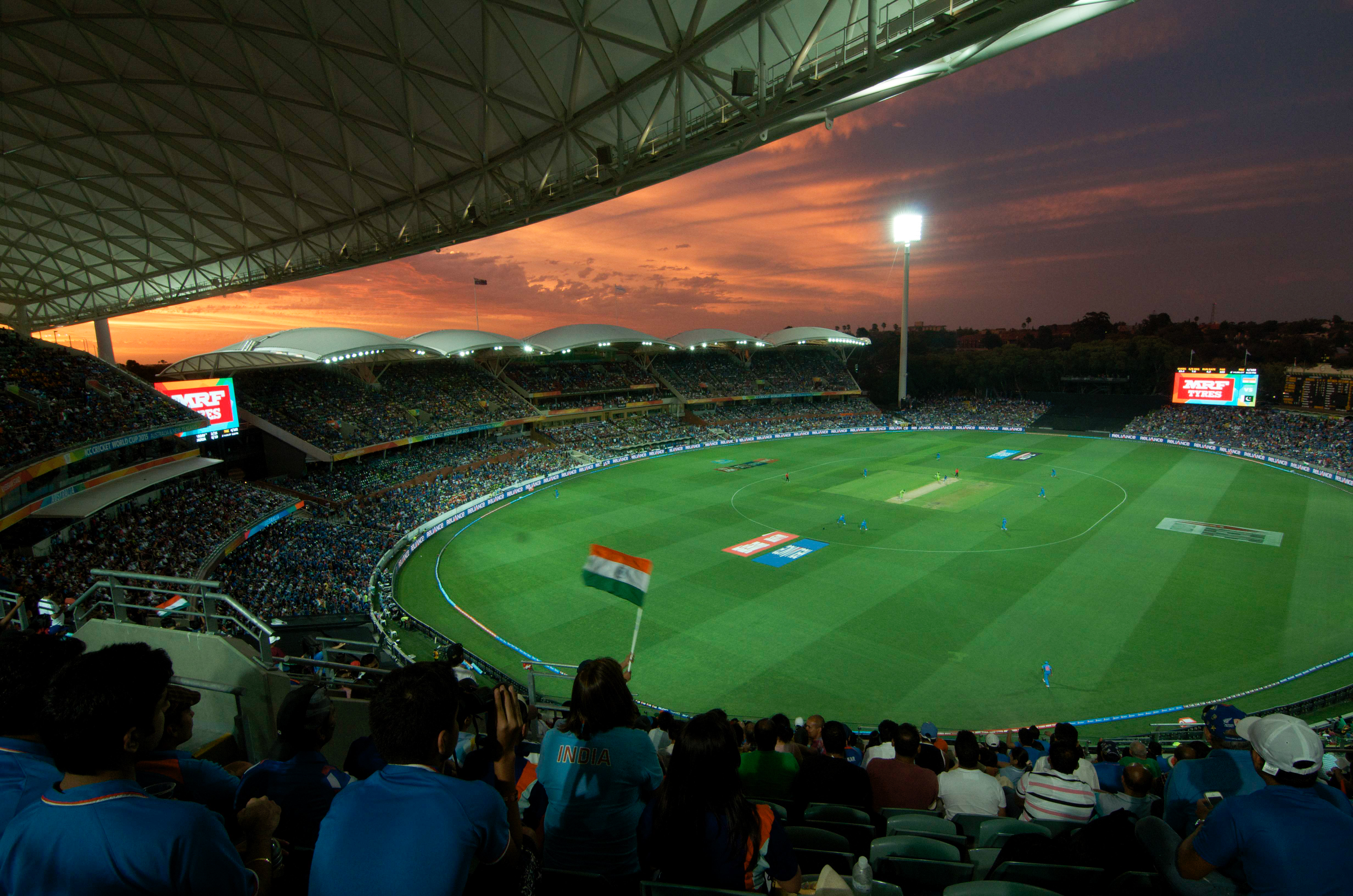
Group stage match between India and Pakistan at the Adelaide Oval

The 2015 Cricket World Cup was co-hosted by Australia and New Zealand. The format remained the same as the previous edition with the teams grouped into two groups of seven teams and the top four teams from each group qualified for the quarter finals. In the Group stage, India were placed in Group B with Pakistan, South Africa, West Indies, Zimbabwe, Ireland and UAE.

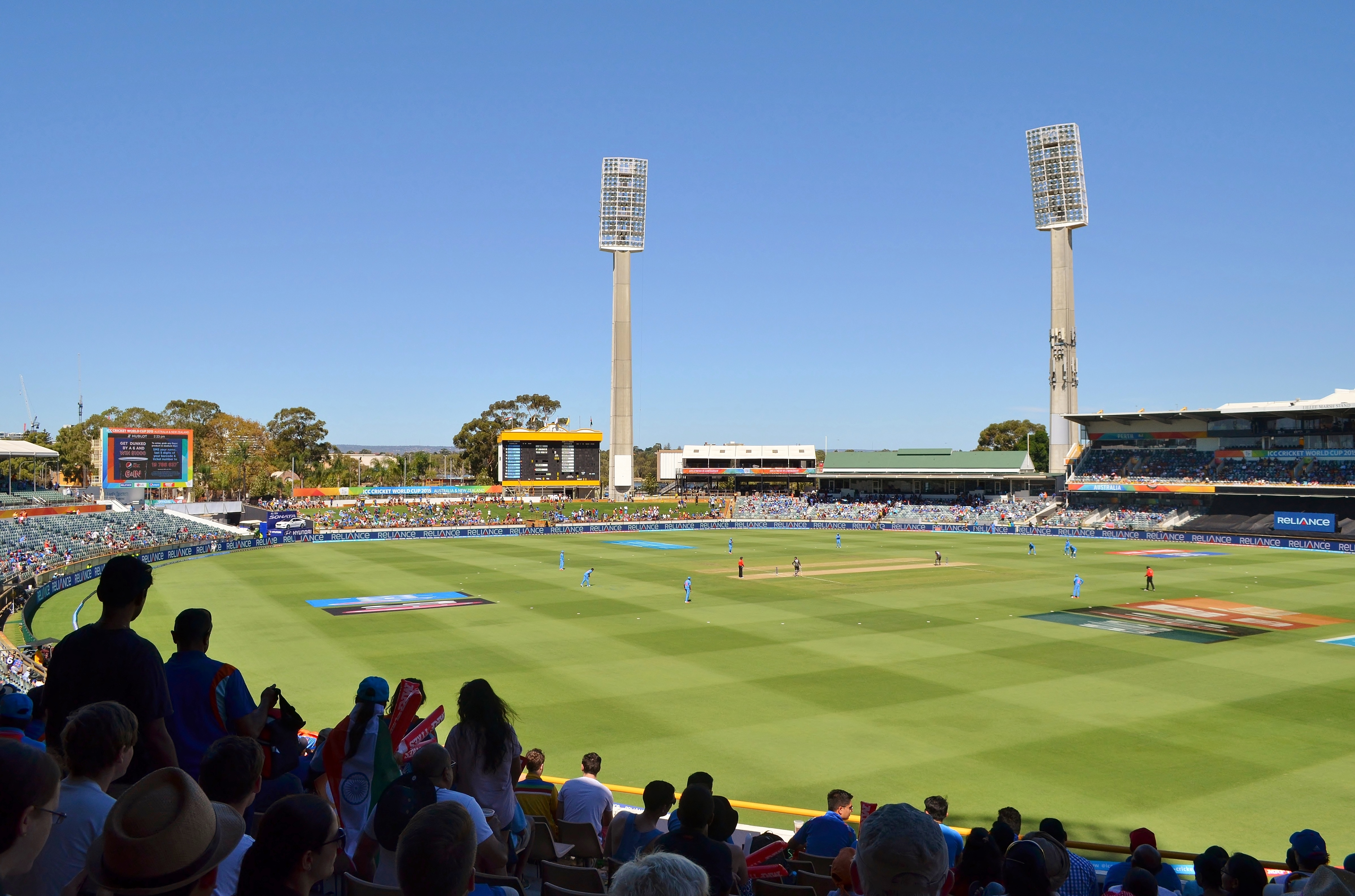
Group stage match between India and UAE at WACA Ground, Perth

India began the campaign with a 76 run win against Pakistan at Adelaide. Batting first, India scored 300 runs with a century from Kohli (107 runs) and bowled out Pakistan for 224 runs with Mohammed Shami taking four wickets. In the next match, India defeated South Africa by 130 runs at Melbourne. India scored 307 runs with Shikhar Dhawan top scoring with 137 runs and in reply, South Africa were bowled out for 177 runs. In the next match, India beat UAE by nine wickets at Perth. UAE were bowled out for 102 runs with Ravichandran Ashwin taking four wickets and India successfully chased the target for the loss of just one wicket with Rohit Sharma top scoring with 57 runs.

In the next match against West Indies, India restricted the opponent to 182 all out, with Shami taking three wickets and successfully chased the target to win by four wickets. In the fifth group stage match, India faced Ireland at Hamilton. Ireland scored 259 runs batting first and in reply, India chased the target with 13 overs to spare. Dhawan scored a century to help India win by eight wickets. In India's last match in the group stage at Auckland, Zimbabwe was bowled out for 287 and India chased the target successfully with Suresh Raina top scoring with 110 runs. India topped the group stage standing after having won all its matches.

In the quarterfinals, India beat Bangladesh by 109 runs at Melbourne. Batting first, India scored 302 runs with Rohit scoring a century (137 runs) and then bowled out Bangladesh for 193 runs. In the semifinals, India played co-hosts Australia at Sydney. India lost the toss and were made to bowl first. Australia scored 328 runs for the loss of seven wickets with Steven Smith scoring a century. Chasing a target of 329, India were all out for 233 runs with only Dhoni reaching a half-century and lost the match by 95 runs. India won 11 consecutive matches in the World Cup in a run stretching back to from 2011 and the Indian team had bowled out the opposition in every match till the semi-finals. Dhawan was the fifth highest run scorer of the tournament with 412 runs. Fast bowlers Umesh Yadav and Shami were third and fourth amongst the tournament's leading bowlers with 18 and 17 wickets respectively.

Results

Event	Group stage							Quarterfinal	Semifinal	Final	Overall Result
Event	Opposition Result	Opposition Result	Opposition Result	Opposition Result	Opposition Result	Opposition Result	Rank	Opposition Result	Opposition Result	Opposition Result	Overall Result
2015	Pakistan; Won by 76 runs	South Africa; Won by 130 runs	United Arab Emirates; Won by 9 wickets	West Indies; Won by 4 wickets	Ireland; Won by 8 wickets	Zimbabwe; Won by 6 wickets	1Q	Bangladesh; Won by 109 runs	Australia; Lost by 95 runs	Did not advance	Semi-finals

== 2019 World Cup ==
Coach: Ravi Shastri

Player	Date of birth	Batting style	Bowling style	First class team
Virat Kohli (c)	5 November 1988	Right-handed	Right-arm medium	Delhi
Mayank Agarwal (Note: Replacement player)	16 February 1991	Right-handed	Right arm off break	Karnataka
Jasprit Bumrah	6 December 1993	Right-handed	Right-arm fast-medium	Gujarat
Yuzvendra Chahal	23 July 1990	Right-handed	Right-arm leg spin	Haryana
Shikhar Dhawan (Note: Withdrew during the tournament due to injury)	5 December 1985	Left-handed	Right-arm off break	Delhi
M.S. Dhoni (wk)	7 July 1981	Right-handed	Wicket-keeper	Jharkhand
Ravindra Jadeja	6 December 1988	Left-handed	Slow left-arm orthodox	Saurashtra
Kedar Jadhav	26 March 1985	Right-handed	Right-arm off spin	Maharashtra
Dinesh Karthik (wk)	1 June 1985	Right-handed	Wicket-keeper	Tamil Nadu
Bhuvneshwar Kumar	5 February 1990	Right-handed	Right-arm medium fast	Uttar Pradesh
Hardik Pandya	11 October 1993	Right-handed	Right arm medium-fast	Baroda
Rishabh Pant (wk)	4 October 1997	Left-handed	Wicket-keeper	Delhi
KL Rahul	18 April 1992	Right-handed	Right arm medium	Karnataka
Mohammed Shami	9 March 1990	Right-handed	Right-arm fast	Bengal
Vijay Shankar	26 January 1991	Right-handed	Right-arm medium	Tamil Nadu
Rohit Sharma	30 April 1987	Right-handed	Right-arm off break	Mumbai
Kuldeep Yadav	14 December 1994	Left-handed	Left-arm unorthodox	Uttar Pradesh

Summary

The 2019 Cricket World Cup was co-hosted by England and Wales. The round-robin format last used in the 1992 World Cup was used for this tournament, with each team playing all the other nine participating teams once and the top four teams then advancing to the semi-finals.

India began their campaign with a win against South Africa at Southampton. Batting first, South Africa posted a score of 227 runs and India chased down the target for the loss of four wickets with Rohit scoring a century (122 runs). India next played Australia at The Oval in which India scored 352 runs while batting first with Dhawan top scoring with 117 runs. Australia was bowled out for 316 runs with Bhuvneshwar Kumar taking three wickets and India won by 36 runs. India's third match against New Zealand was abandoned without a ball being bowled due to rain. In the next match, India beat Pakistan by 89 runs in a rain affected match at Manchester. India posted a total of 336 runs aided by a century from Rohit (140 runs) before Pakistan finished with 212 runs while chasing a revised target of 302 runs in 40 overs. India then beat Afghanistan by 11 runs at Southampton. After scoring 224 runs while batting first, India restricted Afghanistan to 213 runs. Shami took a hat-trick in the match, which was only the second such instance by an Indian bowler in a World Cup since Chetan Sharma in 1987. India won the next match against West Indies by 125 runs. India scored 268 runs batting first and then bowled out West Indies for 143 runs with Shami taking four wickets.

India's first loss in the 2019 World Cup came against hosts England at Edgbaston. England posted a score of 337 runs in 50 overs and chasing 338 to win, India ended their innings at 306 runs to lose by 31 runs. In the next match against Bangladesh two days later, India score 314 runs with Rohit scoring his fourth century in the tournament. Bangladesh was bowled out for 286 with Jasprit Bumrah taking four wickets to help India win by 28 runs. India ended the round robin stage with a seven wicket win over Sri Lanka at Leeds. Batting first, Sri Lanka scored 264 runs in 50 overs and India chased down the target with both openers Rohit (103 runs) and Rahul (111 runs) scoring centuries. Rohit's century was his fifth in the tournament, making him the first ever batsman to hit five centuries in a single Cricket World Cup. India topped the round robin stage with seven wins and qualified for the semifinals.

In the semifinals, India played with New Zealand at Old Trafford in a rain affected match, spread over two days. New Zealand batted first and was restricted to a score of 239 runs in 50 overs. India's score read five runs for the loss of three wickets in the fourth over and India was six wickets down before reaching a total of 100 runs. Though half-centuries by Dhoni and Ravindra Jadeja bought India closer to the target, India was bowled out for 221 runs to lose by 18 runs. As a result, India crashed out of the 2019 Cricket World Cup, the second consecutive Cricket World Cup in which they went out in the semifinal stage. Rohit ended the tournament as the highest scorer with 648 runs. Bumrah was the highest wicket-taker for India with 18 wickets, placing him in joint fourth place.

Results

Event	Group stage										Semifinal	Final	Overall Result
Event	Opposition Result	Opposition Result	Opposition Result	Opposition Result	Opposition Result	Opposition Result	Opposition Result	Opposition Result	Opposition Result	Rank	Opposition Result	Opposition Result	Overall Result
2019	South Africa; Won by 6 wickets	Australia; Won by 36 runs	New Zealand; No Result	Pakistan; Won by 89 runs	Afghanistan; Won by 11 runs	West Indies; Won by 125 runs	England; Lost by 31 runs	Bangladesh; Won by 28 runs	Sri Lanka; Won by 7 wickets	1Q	New Zealand; Lost by 18 runs	Did not advance	Semi-finals

== 2023 World Cup ==
Coach: Rahul Dravid

Player	Date of birth	Batting style	Bowling style	First class team
Rohit Sharma (c)	30 April 1987	Right-handed	Right-arm off break	Mumbai
Ravichandran Ashwin	17 September 1986	Right-handed	Right-arm offbreak	Tamil Nadu
Jasprit Bumrah	6 December 1993	Right-handed	Right-arm fast-medium	Gujarat
Shubhman Gill	8 September 1999	Right-handed	Right-arm off spin	Punjab
Shreyas Iyer	6 December 1994	Right-handed	Right-arm leg spin	Mumbai
Ravindra Jadeja	6 December 1988	Left-handed	Slow left-arm orthodox	Saurashtra
Ishan Kishan (wk)	18 July 1998	Left-handed	Wicket-keeper	Jharkhand
Virat Kohli	5 November 1988	Right-handed	Right-arm medium	Delhi
Prasidh Krishna	19 February 1996	Right-handed	Right-arm medium	Karnataka
Hardik Pandya	11 October 1993	Right-handed	Right arm medium-fast	Baroda
KL Rahul	18 April 1992	Right-handed	Right arm medium	Karnataka
Mohammed Shami	9 March 1990	Right-handed	Right-arm fast	Bengal
Mohammed Siraj	13 March 1994	Right-handed	Right-arm fast	Hyderabad
Shardul Thakur	16 December 1991	Right-handed	Right-arm medium	Mumbai
Kuldeep Yadav	14 December 1994	Left-handed	Left-arm unorthodox	Uttar Pradesh
Suryakumar Yadav	14 December 1990	Right-handed	Right-arm off break	Mumbai

Summary

Group stage match between India and Afghanistan

The 2023 Cricket World Cup was hosted exclusively by India with matches hosted across ten cities. The round-robin format remained in use for the tournament, with each team playing all the other nine participating teams once and the top four teams then advancing to the semifinals.

India began their campaign with a six wicket win over Australia at Chennai. Australia were bowled out for 199 runs before India chased the target with four wickets to spare with Rahul top scoring with 97 runs. In the next match, India defeated Afghanistan by eight wickets at Delhi. Afghanistan scored 272 runs with Bumrah taking four wickets before Rohit scored a century (131 runs) to help India chase the target. India's third match was against Pakistan at Ahmedabad. Pakistan was bowled out for 191 runs and India chased down the total for a seven-wicket victory with Rohit again top scoring once for India with 86 runs. This was followed by a seven-wicket victory over Bangladesh at Pune. India chased down a target of 257 runs with Kohli top scoring with 103 runs. In the next match at Dharamshala, India defeated New Zealand by four wickets. New Zealand were bowled out for 273 runs with Shami taking five wickets and in response, India chased down the target in 48 overs with Kohli again top scoring with 95 runs.

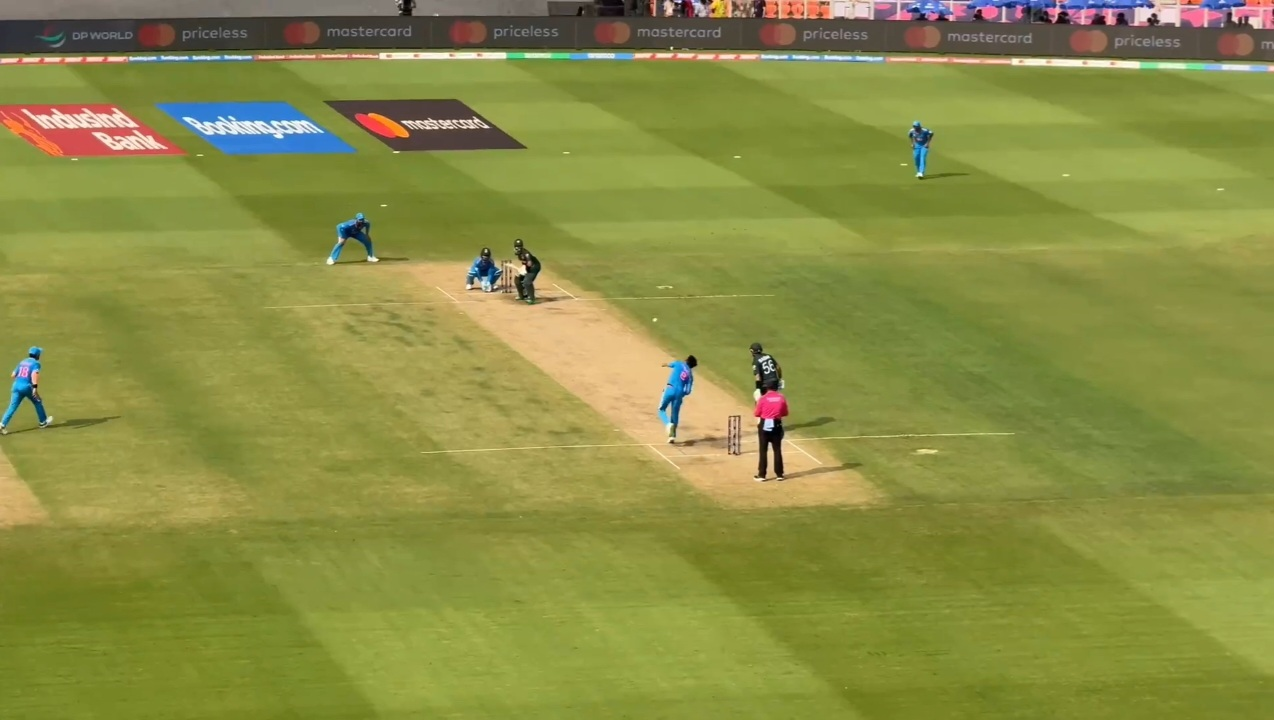
Group stage match between India and Pakistan

India then defeated defending champions England by 100 runs at Lucknow. Batting first for the first time in the tournament, India managed 229 runs with Rohit top scoring with 87 runs before bowling out England for 129 runs with Shami and Bumrah taking four and three wickets respectively. In the next match, India registered a 302-run victory against Sri Lanka in Mumbai, which is India's largest win in the Cricket World Cup in terms of runs. Half centuries from Shubman Gill, Kohli and Shreyas Iyer helped India post a total of 357 runs and in return, Sri Lanka was all out for just 55 runs. Shami took five wickets in the match and with 45 wickets for India in World Cups, he became India's highest wicket taker across World Cups, going past the record of 44 wickets shared by Javagal Srinath and Zaheer Khan. In the next match against South Africa at Kolkata, Kohli scored his 49th ODI hundred as India scored 326 runs in 50 overs and in response, South Africa were all out for 83 runs with Jadeja taking five wickets for a 243-run victory. India finished the group stage with a 160-run win over Netherlands at Bengaluru. India posted a score of 410 runs, the second highest score posted by India in the Cricket World Cup. The top five India batsmen all made 50+ scores and the Indian bowlers later bowled out Netherlands for 250 runs. As a result, India topped the group stage with an all-win record for the second consecutive World Cup.

In the semifinals, India played New Zealand at Mumbai, in a rematch of the 2019 World Cup semifinal. India posted a score of 397 runs with centuries from Kohli and Iyer. Later New Zealand were all out for 327 runs and India won by 70 runs. In this match, Kohli scored his 50th ODI hundred (117 runs) and broke Tendulkar's world record for most ODI hundreds. Shami took seven wickets for 57 runs, which is the best ODI bowling figures by an Indian bowler overall as well as the best bowling performance in a World Cup knockout match. With this victory, India qualified for the final for the first time since 2011, where they faced Australia. The final was held on 19 November 2023 at Ahmedabad, in which Australia won the toss and elected to bowl first. India was bowled out for 240 runs with major contributions from Rahul (66 runs), Kohli (54 runs) and Rohit (47 runs). Australia lost three wickets before scoring 50 runs, but recovered to chase the target with Travis Head top scoring with 137 runs. Australia won by six wickets and lifted their sixth World Cup title in the process. With 765 runs, Virat Kohli was adjudged as the Player of the Tournament and became the highest run-scorer across Cricket World Cups. Rohit with 597 runs and Shreyas Iyer with 530 runs, made it to the top five Indian batsmen who scored the most runs in a single Cricket World Cup, with Rohit also finishing as the second highest run-scorer in the tournament overall. Mohammed Shami was the highest wicket-taker of the tournament with 24 wickets. Jasprit Bumrah with 20 wickets, and Ravindra Jadeja with 16 wickets were amongst the top ten wicket-takers of this edition. Jadeja was amongst the top fielders of this edition with seven catches and Rahul was the second best wicketkeeper in the tournament with 17 dismissals.

Results

Event	Group stage										Semifinal	Final	Overall Result
Event	Opposition Result	Opposition Result	Opposition Result	Opposition Result	Opposition Result	Opposition Result	Opposition Result	Opposition Result	Opposition Result	Rank	Opposition Result	Opposition Result	Overall Result
2023	Australia; Won by 6 wickets	Afghanistan; Won by 8 wickets	Pakistan; Won by 7 wickets	Bangladesh; Won by 7 wickets	New Zealand; Won by 4 wickets	England; Won by 100 runs	Sri Lanka; Won by 302 runs	South Africa; Won by 243 runs	Netherlands; Won by 160 runs	1Q	New Zealand; Won by 70 runs	Australia; Lost by 6 Wickets	Runner-up

== Statistics ==
=== Team records ===
^{†}	Cricket World Cup Record
^	Cricket World Cup Top 5 Record

Highest innings totals
Score	Opponent	Venue	Year	Result
413/5 (50 overs)^	Bermuda	Queen's Park Oval, Port of Spain	2007	Won
410/4 (50 overs)^	Netherlands	Chinnaswamy Stadium, Bengaluru	2023	Won
397/4 (50 overs)	New Zealand	Wankhede Stadium, Mumbai	2023	Won
373/6 (50 overs)	Sri Lanka	County Ground, Taunton	1999	Won
370/4 (50 overs)	Bangladesh	Bangabandhu stadium, Dhaka	2011	Won

Lowest innings totals
Score	Opponent	Venue	Season	Year
125 (41.4 overs)	Australia	Supersport Park, Centurion	2003	Lost
158 (37.5 overs)	Australia	Trent Bridge Cricket Ground, Nottingham	1983	Lost
182 (55.5 overs)	New Zealand	Headingley Cricket Ground, Leeds	1979	Lost
183 (54.4 overs)	West Indies	Lord's Cricket Ground, London	1983	Won
185 (43.3 overs)	Sri Lanka	Queen's Park Oval, Port of Spain	2007	Lost

Highest successful chases
Score	Opponent	Venue	Year
288/4 (48.4 overs)	Zimbabwe	Eden Park, Auckland	2015
277/4 (48.2 overs)	Sri Lanka	Wankhede Stadium, Mumbai	2011
276/4 (45.4 overs)	Pakistan	Supersport Park, Centurion	2003
274/6 (48.0 overs)	New Zealand	HPCA Stadium, Dharamsala	2023
273/2 (35 overs)	Afghanistan	Arun Jaitley Stadium, Delhi	2023

=== Batting records ===
Most runs
Runs	Player	Matches	Innings	HS	Average	100s	50s	Period
2,278	Sachin Tendulkar^{†}	45	44	152	56.95	6	15	1992–2011
1,795	Virat Kohli^	37	37	117	59.83	5	12	2011–2023
1,575	Rohit Sharma^	28	28	140	60.57	7	6	2015–2023
1,006	Sourav Ganguly	21	21	183	55.88	4	3	1999–2007
860	Rahul Dravid	22	21	145	61.42	2	6	1999–2007

Most runs in a single tournament
Runs	Player	Matches	Innings	Average	100s	50s	Year
765^{†}	Virat Kohli	11	11	95.62	3	6	2023
673^	Sachin Tendulkar	11	11	61.18	1	6	2003
648^	Rohit Sharma	9	9	81.00	5	1	2019
597	Rohit Sharma	11	11	55.00	1	3	2023
530	Shreyas Iyer	11	11	66.25	2	3	2023

Highest individual scores
Score	Player	Opponent	Venue	Year	Result
183^	Saurav Ganguly	Sri Lanka	County Ground, Taunton	1999	Won
175*	Kapil Dev	Zimbabwe	Nevill Ground, Tunbridge Wells	1983	Won
175	Virender Sehwag	Bangladesh	Bangabandhu Stadium, Dhaka	2011	Won
152	Sachin Tendulkar	Namibia	City Oval, Pietermaritzburg	2003	Won
145	Rahul Dravid	Sri Lanka	County Ground, Taunton	1999	Won

Highest partnerships
Runs	Wicket	Players	Opponent	Venue	Year	Result
318^	2nd	Sourav Ganguly (183); Rahul Dravid (145)	Sri Lanka	County Ground, Taunton	1999	Won
244	2nd	Sachin Tendulkar (152); Sourav Ganguly (111)	Namibia	City Oval, Pietermaritzburg	2003	Won
237*	3rd	Rahul Dravid (104*); Sachin Tendulkar (140*)	Kenya	County Ground, Bristol	1999	Won
208	4th	Shreyas Iyer (128*); K. L. Rahul (102)	Netherlands	Chinnaswamy Stadium, Bengaluru	2023	Won
203	3rd	Virender Sehwag (175); Virat Kohli (100)	Bangladesh	Bangabandhu Stadium, Dhaka	2011	Won

Highest partnership for each wicket
Runs	Wicket	Players	Opponent	Venue	Year	Result
1st	189	Rohit Sharma (103); K. L. Rahul (111)	Sri Lanka	Headingley Cricket Ground, Leeds	2019	Won
2nd^	318	Sourav Ganguly (183); Rahul Dravid (145)	Sri Lanka	County Ground, Taunton	1999	Won
3rd^{†}	237*	Rahul Dravid (104*); Sachin Tendulkar (140*)	Kenya	County Ground, Bristol	1999	Won
4th^{†}	208	Shreyas Iyer (128*); K. L. Rahul (102)	Netherlands	Chinnaswamy Stadium, Bengaluru	2023	Won
5th	196*	Suresh Raina (110*); Mahendra Singh Dhoni (85*)	Zimbabwe	Eden Park, Auckland	2015	Won
6th	74*	Suresh Raina (34*); Yuvraj Singh (57*)	Australia	Sardar Patel Stadium, Ahmedabad	2011	Won
7th^	116	Ravindra Jadeja (77); Mahendra Singh Dhoni (50)	New Zealand	Old Trafford Cricket Ground, Manchester	2019	Lost
8th	82*	Kapil Dev (72*); Kiran More (42*)	New Zealand	Chinnaswamy Stadium, Bangalore	1987	Won
9th^{†}	126*	Kapil Dev (175*); Syed Kirmani (24*)	Zimbabwe	Nevill Ground, Tunbridge Wells	1983	Won
10th	32	Zaheer Khan (15); Munaf Patel (15)	Bangladesh	Queen's Park Oval, Port of Spain	2007	Lost

=== Bowling records ===
Most wickets
Wickets	Player	Matches	Average	Econ	BBI	4W	5W	Span
55^	Mohammed Shami	18	13.52	5.12	7/57	4	4	2015–2023
44	Zaheer Khan	23	20.22	4.47	4/42	1	0	2003–2011
44	Javagal Srinath	34	27.81	4.32	4/30	2	0	1992–2003
38	Jasprit Bumrah	20	19.57	4.23	4/39	2	0	2019–2023
31	Anil Kumble	18	22.83	4.08	4/32	1	0	1996–2007

Most wickets in a single tournament
Wickets	Player	Matches	Average	Econ	BBI	4W	5W	Year
24^	Mohammed Shami	7	10.70	5.26	7/57	1	3	2023
21	Zaheer Khan	9	18.76	4.83	3/20	0	0	2011
20	Jasprit Bumrah	11	18.65	4.06	4/39	1	0	2023
18	Umesh Yadav	8	17.83	4.98	4/31	2	0	2015
18	Roger Binny	8	18.86	3.81	4/29	1	0	1983
18	Jasprit Bumrah	9	20.61	4.41	4/55	1	0	2019
18	Zaheer Khan	11	20.77	4.23	4/42	1	0	2003

Best innings figures
Bowling figure	Player	Opponent	Venue	Year	Result
7–57 (9.5 overs)^	Mohammed Shami	New Zealand	Wankhede Stadium, Mumbai	2023	Won
6–23 (10 overs)	Ashish Nehra	England	Kingsmead Cricket Ground, Durban	2003	Won
5–18 (5 overs)	Mohammed Shami	Sri Lanka	Wankhede Stadium, Mumbai	2023	Won
5–27 (9.3 overs)	Venkatesh Prasad	Pakistan	Old Trafford Cricket Ground, Manchester	1999	Won
5–31 (9.3 overs)	Robin Singh	Sri Lanka	County Ground, Taunton	1999	Won

== See also ==
- India at the Champions Trophy
- List of Cricket World Cup records
- List of India One Day International cricket records
- List of One Day International cricket records
